= Nicholas Saputra =

Indonesian actor and film producer

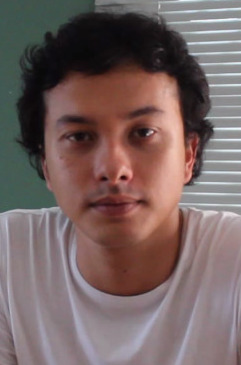
- Saputra in 2015
- Born: Nicholas Schubring Saputra; 24 February 1984 (age 42); Jakarta, Indonesia
- Education: University of Indonesia, (Architecture)
- Occupations: Actor; Producer; Businessman; Activist
- Years active: 2002–present

Nicholas Schubring Saputra (born 24 February 1984) is an Indonesian actor and film producer. He first rose to prominence as Rangga in the 2002 hit film Ada Apa dengan Cinta?, a role he reprised in Ada Apa Dengan Cinta? 2 in 2016. He has since established himself as one of Indonesia's most acclaimed actors with two Citra Award wins for Best Actor as the titular character in Riri Riza's Gie in 2005 and Best Supporting Actor in Edwin's Aruna & Her Palate in 2018.

Saputra is also an activist dedicated to environmental and conservation issues, as well as supporting children's rights. He has served as executive producer and producer of several environmental films through his production company, Tanakhir Films. In 2019, Saputra was named a UNICEF Indonesia Goodwill Ambassador.

== Early life and education ==
Saputra was born on 24 February 1984 in Jakarta, Indonesia, to Horst Schbring, a German father, and an Indonesian-Javanese mother from Yogyakarta. His maternal grandfather was from Kebumen and his maternal grandmother was from Kutoarjo. After graduating from SMA Negeri 8 Jakarta high school, Saputra continued his study in University of Indonesia. He was named as one of valedictorians in high school. He holds a degree in architecture from University of Indonesia.

== Career ==
=== 2002–2004: Breakthrough and Citra Award win ===
Saputra started his career in fashion industry as a runway model and has appeared in magazine's covers when he was in high school. He was scouted by a teen magazine while playing baseball in Gelora Bung Karno Stadium when he was fifteen.

An inexperienced actor without any history in the entertainment industry, Saputra landed the lead role at his very first audition at age 17, to play in Rudy Soedjarwo's cult classic romance blockbuster Ada Apa dengan Cinta? opposite actress Dian Sastrowardoyo, which was released in 2002. For his performance in the film as Rangga, an indifferent and aloof student who caught up in romance with the most popular girl in high school, he earned his first Citra (the Indonesian equivalent to the Oscars) nomination in Indonesian Film Festival for Best Leading Actor. The film also catapulted him to stardom in both Indonesia and Malaysia. Saputra recalls of his career beginnings:

Being an actor is never my dream, actually. The offer came when I was in high school, and I was simply testing the water, thinking that I got nothing to lose.

In 2003, Saputra was cast as a violinist in Biola Tak Berdawai, written and directed by Sekar Ayu Asmara. The film had its world premiere at the Cairo International Film Festival, where it secured the Best New Director award and Naguib Mahfouz prize for Best Screenplay. It was also Indonesia's submission to the 76th Academy Awards for Best Foreign Language Film. For his performance in the film, Saputra was awarded Best Actor at the 2003 Bali International Film Festival.

Saputra landed another lead role in Joko Anwar's 2005 romantic comedy Janji Joni as a roll film delivery man, playing opposite Mariana Renata, which won him Most Favorite Actor award at the 2005 MTV Indonesia Movie Awards and Best Actor award at the 2007 Indonesian Movie Awards. The film was screened in the Sydney Film Festival and Pusan International Film Festival. That same year, he starred as a Chinese Indonesian activist Soe Hok Gie in the biographical film Gie, directed by Riri Riza. His performance as Soe Hok Gie was critically acclaimed; Thus, he won Citra Award for Best Leading Actor at the 2005 Indonesian Film Festival, two Best Actor awards at the 2005 Indonesian Movie Awards and 2006 Bandung Film Festival, and Most Favorite Actor award at the 2006 MTV Indonesia Movie Awards. The film was Indonesia's submission to the 79th Academy Awards for Best Foreign Language Film.

Saputra made his first television appearances on Channel V Asia, hosting such segments as The Ticket and Screentime in 2007, and became the co-presenter at the 2007 Asian Film Awards alongside Lee Byung Hun and Daniel Wu. He played in Riri Riza's 3 Hari Untuk Selamanya in the same year. The film won Best Direction at the 2008 Brussels International Independent Film Festival and Best Indonesian Film Award at the 2007 Jakarta International Film Festival, while Saputra was nominated for Best Actor award at the 2008 Indonesian Film Festival and won Best Leading Actor at the 2009 Guardians e-Awards.

=== 2008–2018: Further critical and commercial success ===
In 2008, Saputra starred in omnibus film Cinta Setaman, and reunited with Dian Sastrowardoyo in two films; a short musical film adapted from the epic Mahabharata Drupadi, and 3 Doa 3 Cinta, respectively. He was appointed as a jury member of the Best Asian Film competition in the 2008 Singapore International Film Festival, and as French Film Ambassador for the 2009 French Film Festival in Indonesia. He once again became co-presenter at the 2009 Asian Film Awards alongside Chie Tanaka.

Saputra became a sportcaster for Malaysian TV station TV3 in 2011. That same year, he starred in director Riri Riza's environmental documentary The Magic Kakaban. He next starred in two indies in 2012 and 2013, respectively; Edwin's Postcards from the Zoo which had its premiere at the 62nd Berlin International Film Festival, and Mouly Surya's What They Don't Talk About When They Talk About Love as a deaf man who falls in love with a blind girl. The latter became the first Indonesian title that notched a nomination for World Cinematic Drama in the 2013 Sundance Film Festival, and it received NETPAC Award at the 2013 International Film Festival Rotterdam.

Saputra embarked on the film production for the first time as an executive producer alongside director Riri Riza in 2013 for Sokola Rimba, which tells the story of activist Butet Manurung who teaches Orang Rimba people, based on a book with the same title. It won Best Film at the 2013 Maya Awards. That same year, Saputra co-founded production company Tanakhir Films focusing on documentaries and environmental films, and next co-starred in his first production Cinta Dari Wamena, a story about an HIV/AIDS awareness campaign in Wamena.

Eight years after Janji Joni, Saputra reunited with co-star Mariana Renata in a South Korean-Indonesian joint production film Someone’s Wife in the Boat of Someone’s Husband; a part of Jeonju International Film Festival's Jeonju Digital Project. The film was screening at the 2013 Locarno Film Festival, as well.

Saputra acted in his first action film Pendekar Tongkat Emas in 2014 alongside Christine Hakim, where he played a mysterious warrior, Elang, a role that also involved heavily choreographed fight sequences. He next returned playing the character Rangga in Ada Apa Dengan Cinta? 2014 one-episode drama, a spin-off of the 2002 original title which was initiated by LINE and released through YouTube channel in November 2014. The following year, Saputra reunited for the third time with Mariana Renata in a web series Nic and Mar. A story about rekindled lovers, it was released in March 2015 and aired weekly on Thursday and Friday through mobile phone.

Following Ada Apa Dengan Cinta? 2014 success, Saputra reprised the role of Rangga in Ada Apa Dengan Cinta? 2, a film sequel that was premiered in 2016. The film was critically acclaimed and became one of the highest-grossing films in Indonesia. It has gathered more than one million audience in Malaysia and Brunei. This was followed by a Malaysian fantasy thriller Interchange, which debuted at the 2016 Locarno International Film Festival and Toronto International Film Festival.

"I learned from every character I played, because it’s important to give something to my characters as well as to learn something from them. Somehow I am shaped by my characters."

— Saputra in 2017 on what he has learned from acting

Saputra next co-produced, narrated and appeared in Save Our Forest Giants, a short documentary film to raise awareness about elephant conservation, in collaboration with the European Union Delegation to Indonesia. The film was launched at the French cultural center in Jakarta, in June 2016.

=== 2018–present: Second Citra Award win and expanded activism ===
In early 2018, Saputra was appointed as the jury member for South-east Asian film maker competition in the 2nd HOOQ Filmmakers Guild. That same year, he returned to acting by co-starring in Aruna & Lidahnya as a chef, a film adapted from Laksmi Pamuntjak's 2014 novel “The Bird Woman’s Palate,” which secured him Citra Award for Best Supporting Actor at the 2018 Indonesian Film Festival. The film was screening in the Culinary Cinema Section at the 2019 Berlin Film Festival, and won ABC Award at the 2019 Osaka Asian Film Festival. Saputra closed the 2018 by leading in all three omnibus episodes of Asian Three-Fold Mirror 2018: The Journey (The Sea, Hekishu, and Variable No.3), directed by Japan’s Daichi Matsunaga, Indonesia’s Edwin and China’s Degena Yun. The film was co-produced by Tokyo International Film Festival and Japan Foundation Asian Center, a part of biannual Asian Three-Fold Mirror Project. It had its world premiere at the 31st Tokyo International Film Festival on October 26, 2018.

The following year, Saputra co-starred in the Filipino-Malaysian joint production horror film Motel Acacia. The film had its world premiere at the 32nd Tokyo International Film Festival in November 2019. Allan Hunter of Screen Daily wrote, "[c]harismatic Nicholas Saputra making the biggest impression as a former accountant trying to survive his ordeal in the cursed motel."

In November 2019, Saputra was chosen to become the UNICEF Goodwill Ambassador. Saputra said about his appointment, "I feel honoured that UNICEF in Indonesia has trusted me with this role. Activism has always been my passion because I care about this nation’s future. I believe we should start from the very beginning, ensuring that Indonesian children’s rights are fulfilled so we can build a better world for children." In December 2019, he joined UNICEF campaigns to drive awareness of the need to improve water and sanitation services, as well as basic hygiene practices. He also joined the Leuser ecosystem foundation campaign to raise public awareness about the ecosystem conservation located in Mount Leuser National Park.

With his production company Tanakhir Films, Saputra produced their first feature documentary film Semesta (Islands of Faith) that tells a story of seven Indonesian environmental activists. The film had its world premiere at the Suncine International Environmental Film Festival in Barcelona in November 2019 prior to the local release in February 2020. It was nominated for Best Feature Documentary at the 2020 Indonesian Film Festival. It was released on Netflix in August, 2020.

Saputra next is set to portray Aquanus in the Bumilangit Cinematic Universe based on the comic book superhero character created by Wid N. S. in 1968. In November 2020, he was also cast to star in Riri Riza's upcoming film Paranoia.

In 2024, Saputra starred with Filipino actor Julia Barretto and South Korean actor Sang Heon Lee in Viu Philippines’ romantic miniseries Secret Ingredient.

== Personal life ==
Saputra is the only child in the family. He and his frequent co-star/collaborator Dian Sastrowardoyo are best friends and University of Indonesia alumni. From 2005 to 2006, he was romantically linked to Janji Joni co-star Mariana Renata.

Saputra is an avid traveler and has already ventured into the North and Latin America, Europe, Africa, and all around Indonesia. He once lived in a remote village in Flores and has been on a boat that nearly capsized. He became an environmentalist after he joined an NGO to volunteer for the Aceh tsunami's aftermath in March 2005, three months after the catastrophe. He obtained his diving license in 2006.

"Travelling is good for the soul. When you’re travelling, you become a more open person. You realize there is not just one type of human being. There are diverse cultures. The same applies to the nature around us."

— Saputra in 2017 on why he loves travelling

Saputra is also an avid photographer. Most of his Instagram posts are his photography works.

Saputra has been a part of The Nature Conservancy (TNC) since 2008, during which he introduced classrooms and a travelling library to the area of Raja Ampat, Papua. He remains active in forest and orangutan conservation efforts in Indonesia.

Saputra co-founded Tanakhir Films with Ada Apa Dengan Cinta? publicist Mandy Marahimin in 2013. The company focuses on cultural and environmental film production. In 2017, he collaborated with artist Angki Purbandono to hold an art installation, titled "Post Jungle-Tangkahan" about the life of Sumatran elephant. The exhibition also featured the photos taken by Saputra.

In addition to being a dedicated environmentalist and active in conservation campaigns, Saputra built an eco friendly lodge on the border of Mount Leuser National Park in Tangkahan, North Sumatra, to support the local's ecotourism.

== Filmography ==
=== Feature films ===
Year	Film	Role	Notes
2002	Ada Apa dengan Cinta?	Rangga	
2003	The Stringless Violin	Bhisma	
2003	Arisan!	Main the Gallery	Cameo role
2005	Joni's Promise	Joni	
2005	Gie	Soe Hok Gie	
2007	3 Days to Forever	Yusuf	
2008	Love Potpourri	DVD Seller	
2008	3 Prayers 3 Love	Huda	
2011	Sarinah	Rana	
2011	Magic Kakaban	—N/a	Documentary film
2012	Postcards from the Zoo	The Magician	
2012	Kita Versus Korupsi	Vano	Segment: 'Aku Padamu'
2013	What They Don't Talk About When They Talk About Love	Edo	
2013	Someone's Wife in the Boat of Someone's Husband	Husband	Segment: 'Strangers'
2013	Cinta dari Wamena	Daniel	
2014	The Golden Cane Warrior	Elang	
2016	Ada Apa Dengan Cinta? 2	Rangga	
2016	Save Our Forest Giants	Narrator	Documentary film (also as executive producer)
2016	Interchange	Belian	
2018	Aruna & Her Palate	Bono	
2019	Motel Acacia	Don	
2020	Islands of Faith	—N/a	Documentary film (as producer)
2021	Paranoia	Raka	
2022	Sayap Sayap Patah	Adji	
2024	The Architecture of Love	River Jusuf	
2024	Borderless Fog	Battalion commander	
2025	Siapa Dia	Layar	
2025	Rangga & Cinta	—N/a	As producer
2026	Red Before Dawn	Frans	

=== Short films ===
Year	Film	Role	Notes
2008	Hulahoop Soundings	Nico	
2008	Drupadi	Arjuna	
2014	Ada Apa Dengan Cinta? 2014	Rangga	
2018	The Journey (The Sea, Hekishu, Variable No.3)	Kenji	Omnibus
2020	There's No New York Today	Himself	Voice role

=== Television ===
Year	Film	Role	Notes
2007	Channel V's The Ticket	Host	
2007	Channel V's Screentime	Host	
2007	1st Asian Film Awards	Co-presenter	With Lee Byung Hun & Daniel Wu
2009	3rd Asian Film Awards	Co-presenter	With Chie Tanaka
2011	Sport News on TV3	Sportscaster	
2015	Nic and Mar	Nic	7-episode web series
2024	Secret Ingredient	Arif	6-episode streaming series

=== Music video appearances ===
Year	Song	Artist
2002	"Tentang Seseorang"	Anda
2003	"Tak Mampu Mendua"	Kahitna
2003	"Debaran Cinta"	Siti Nurhaliza
2005	"Ijinkan Aju Menyayangimu"	Iwan Fals
2008	"Ingat Kamu"	Duo Maia
2008	"Shadows"	Nidji
2008	"Pernah Muda"	Bunga Citra Lestari
2016	"Kali Kedua"	Raisa
2019	"Adu Rayu"	Yovie Widianto, Tulus, and Glenn Fredly
2023	"Nyaman Tak Cukup"	Raisa
2025	"Tanda"	Yura Yunita

== Awards and nominations ==
Year	Awards	Category	Work	Results	Notes
2003	Bali International Film Festival	Best Actor	The Stringless Violin	Won	
2004	1st MTV Indonesia Movie Awards	Most Favorite Actor	The Stringless Violin	Nominated	
2004	24th Citra Awards	Best Actor	Ada Apa Dengan Cinta?	Nominated	
2005	2nd MTV Indonesia Movie Awards	Most Favorite Actor	Joni's Promise	Won	
2005	25th Citra Awards	Best Actor	Joni's Promise	Nominated	
2005	25th Citra Awards	Best Actor	Gie	Won	
2006	3rd MTV Indonesia Movie Awards	Most Favorite Actor	Gie	Won	
2006	Bandung Film Festival	Best Actor	Gie	Nominated	
2007	1st Indonesian Movie Awards	Best Actor	Joni's Promise	Won	
2007	1st Indonesian Movie Awards	Favorite Actor	Joni's Promise	Nominated	
2008	28th Citra Awards	Best Actor	3 Doa 3 Cinta	Nominated	
2009	3rd Indonesian Movie Awards	Best Actor	3 Doa 3 Cinta	Nominated	
2009	3rd Indonesian Movie Awards	Favorite Actor	3 Doa 3 Cinta	Nominated	
2012	1st Maya Awards	Best Actor in a Leading Role	Postcards from the Zoo	Nominated	
2014	8th Indonesian Movie Awards	Best Actor	What They Don't Talk About When They Talk About Love	Nominated	
2014	8th Indonesian Movie Awards	Favorite Actor	What They Don't Talk About When They Talk About Love	Nominated	
2014	8th Indonesian Movie Awards	Best Chemistry	What They Don't Talk About When They Talk About Love	Won	shared with Ayushita
2015	2nd Indonesian Choice Awards	Actor of the Year	—N/a	Nominated	
2017	2nd Indonesian Box Office Movie Awards	Best Actor	Ada Apa Dengan Cinta? 2	Nominated	
2017	2nd Usmar Ismail Awards	Favorite Actor	Ada Apa Dengan Cinta? 2	Nominated	
2018	38th Citra Awards	Best Supporting Actor	Aruna & Her Palate	Won	
