= Sitism (album) =

Studio album by Siti Nurhaliza
- Released: 30 June 2023
- Recorded: February – June 2023
- Studios: Popsicle Records; Mixbro Records; Pro Recording Studio
- Genres: Pop; R&B
- Length: 29:56; 46:00 (Deluxe edition)
- Labels: Siti Nurhaliza Productions; Universal Music Group (Malaysia)
- Producers: Dato' Sri Siti Nurhaliza (executive); Kenny Ong (executive); Aubrey Suwito; Luca Sickta; Sharon Paul; Mingaling; Tomok; Andi Rianto; Mas Dewangga

Siti Nurhaliza chronology
Legasi (2021)	Sitism (2023)	Gema Bumantara (2025)

Singles from Sitism
- 1. "Menjaga Cintamu" Released: 18 May 2023; 2. "Romansa Kita" Released: 21 July 2023; 3. "Sehebat Matahari" Released: 10 October 2023; 4. "Senyawa" Released: 14 October 2023; 5. "Magis" Released: 7 October 2024

Sitism is the twentyfirst studio album by Malaysian singer, Siti Nurhaliza. It was released by Universal Music Malaysia and her own company, Siti Nurhaliza Productions on 30 June 2023. Recorded between February to June 2023, the album was a collaboration between Malaysian and Indonesian composers, lyricists, and producers.

Pre-order for the limited edition of Sitism made available on SNP Onpay website on 18 August 2023 and all 1,000 available copies sold out in six hours. "Menjaga Cintamu" (Taking Care of Your Love), the debut single for the album, was released on 18 May 2023. A deluxe edition of the album was released on 8 September 2023.

== Background and recording ==
In May 2023, Siti Nurhaliza announced that she would released a new album, with seven new songs have been recorded during the holy Ramadhan fasting month. She initially planned to have 12 songs in her new album, but only eight songs make the final cut.

The recording and production of Sitism began in February 2023 and took three months to completed. For the album, Siti Nurhaliza has received 80 song submissions, including from Indonesian songwriters and 11 songs were chosen. At the early stages of the recording, Siti admitted that she had faced voice box problems while the recording her new album and concerned that she had slower recuperation of her vocals. She, however, have made peace with possibility of losing her voice. She said: "It came to a point where I have accepted if Allah were to take voice. In my 40s, if my voice is rough, or hoarse, I'm ok. I'll sing to the best of my ability. I'm always positive".

Siti disclosed that she had to recorded several songs in the album twice following the recuperation of her voice box. The first recording was made during Ramadhan, which Siti said she can't drink during the period. Despite having sore throat, Siti resumed the album's recording. She, however, was able to complete the recordings of Sitism at the stipulated time. "Kalau Berkasih" ("If You Had Love"), one of the four additional songs in the album's deluxe version, marks Siti Nurhaliza's first collaboration with renowned singer-actor, Awie. Both Siti and Awie previously have performing together at the Music of the Soul: An Evening concert in November 2022, and from that, she proposed him to collaborated together. She felt that Awie has an advantage, and commented, "when he sings traditional songs, it really suits him". (Note: Original: "...apabila dia nyanyi lagu tradisional memang kena".) Siti discloses that she was to find a male singer to be her duet partner and Awie was chosen. The song is originally recorded with solo vocal by Siti, but it turned to a duet vocal with Awie.

Apart from employing local Malaysian talents, Siti also sourced musicians and artists from Indonesia to contribute to the materials in Sitism. Andi Rianto, an Indonesian composer best known for his film score works, composed "Menjaga Cintamu", the album's lead single, with the recording start in March 2023. Andi disclosed that he was impressed with Siti, who took one hour to record the song. He recalled, "After finished the demo for the song, I sent it to Siti and she likes it. In March, I flew to Malaysia for a recording session". The song was inspired by the true events of Anwar Ibrahim and Wan Azizah Wan Ismail during the Reformasi in 1998.

The audio mastering for all tracks were done by Jay Franco of Sterling Sound in New York City, except for "Menjaga Cintamu" which was mastered by Ari Renaldi.

== Artwork and title ==
The album cover of Sitism portrays a cyber retro futurism concept, which Siti Nurhaliza said "it is a combination of art styles and design inspired by elements of the past such as nostalgia and retro style, the present and the injection of futuristic elements" (Note: Original: "...ia adalah gabungan gaya seni dan reka bentuk inspirasi dari elemen masa silam seperti nostalgia dan gaya retro, masa kini serta suntikan elemen futuristik".) and described these elements was "very unique because of its function as an imaginative view of the future in the music industry". (Note: Original: "...sangat unik kerana fungsinya sebagai imaginatif mengenai pandangan masa hadapan dalam industri muzik".) The cover also features Siti wearing headphones. She explained, "The headphone style is symbolic of the style of listening to music and audio in this cyber era, while the interweaving of musical note elements symbolizes the creative formula, namely the composer and lyricist, as well as the exploration of new ideas to produce the best rhythm". (Note: Original: "Gaya 'headphone' adalah simbolik gaya mendengar muzik dan audio pada era siber ini, manakala jalinan elemen nota muzik simbolik formula penciptaan iaitu komposer dan penulis lirik serta penjelajahan idea baharu untuk menghasilkan irama terbaik".)

The combination of two metallic colours, copper and golden yellow, was chosen by Siti and her team to reflect her personal depiction and trademarks. According to Siti, the combination of these two metallic colours represents "the exclusivity, elegance and courage of my long-established artistic career". (Note: Original: "...eksklusiviti, keanggunan dan keberanian saya yang sudah sekian lama bertapak dalam kerjaya seni".) The album's title, Sitism, is a combination of her name, Siti and the word 'ism' to symbolize the album's quality, ideology and direction. The term was coined by Aubrey Suwito, one of the album's producer. He described the title reflects Siti's "own unique self in line with the passage of time and the development of music which is displayed through her music, lyrics, images and performances". (Note: Original: "..adalah dirinya yang tersendiri seiring dengan peredaran masa dan perkembangan muzik yang dipaparkan menerusi muzik, lirik, imej serta persembahannya".)

=== Controversy ===
Sitism's album cover concept drews criticism prior to its release when Siti Nurhaliza expresses her disappointment with some netizens insulted the album cover. In her Instagram posts, Siti uploaded a screenshot of netizen's comments who degraded the cover photo and some of them related the headphones she wears on the album cover with mental illness and individuals with autism. She also filed a report to the Malaysian Communications and Multimedia Commission (MCMC) over the matter.

== Release and promotion ==
The standard version of Sitism was released on 30 June 2023, containing only 8 tracks. Upon its release, the album become trending in Twitter (now X) when it reaches more than 12,000 posts. The album also reached number one spot at iTunes and Apple Music in Malaysia and Brunei, third in Singapore, fourth in Indonesia and 153th in Australia. To promote the album's release, pre-order for limited edition of the album was made available at SNP Onpay website from 18 to 25 August. However, all 1,000 copies of the album, which came with the album's poster, sold out within six hours. A deluxe version of Sitism was released on 8 September 2023, three months after its standard version was released, containing 12 songs with the addition of four new tracks. Sitism would be Siti Nurhaliza's first album to have its deluxe edition.

=== Singles ===
Five singles were released from Sitism to date. "Menjaga Cintamu" was released as the album's first single. It was released on 18 May as a soundtrack for the 2023 Malaysian political drama film, Anwar: The Untold Story and available for streaming and download. Siti said that the she was attracted with the song's messages, while understands that its lyrics "more to a wife's sacrifice and unparalleled love". (Note: Original: "...lebih kepada pengorbanan seorang isteri dan cinta yang tiada tolok bandingan".) A music video was filmed and released to promote the single, directed by Viva Westi.

== Critical reception ==
Sitism received generally positive reviews from music critics. Writing for Utusan Malaysia, Mohd Fadhli Mohd Sulaiman praised most of the songs in the album were "neatly arranged". (Note: Original: "...disusun penuh tertib".) Hanisah Selamat of Kosmo! wrote the album is an "official symbolism of Siti Nurhaliza as a stronger musical brand".

== Track listing ==
No.	Title	Writer(s)	Producer(s)	Length
1.	"Menyapa Dunia"	Melly Goeslaw	Aubrey Suwito	3:06
2.	"Tanpa Diri-Mu"	Luca Sickta, Siti Nurhaliza	Luca Sickta	4:11
3.	"Sehebat Matahari"	Aubrey Suwito, Rozisangdewi	Aubrey Suwito	3:56
4.	"Ganti" (duet with Nao Zumar)	Mingaling, Nuha Nik, Amer Hassan	Mingaling	3:25
5.	"Romansa Kita"	Sharon Paul, Rozisangdewi	Sharon Paul	3:36
6.	"Teratas"	Tomok, Rudy Nastia, Fedtri Yahya	Tomok	4:21
7.	"Menjaga Cintamu" (OST Anwar: The Untold Story)	Andi Rianto, Sekar Ayu Asmara	Andi Rianto	4:07
8.	"Magis"	Mas Dewangga, Jova Debito, Aden King	Mas Dewangga	3:14
Total length:				29.56

Deluxe version bonus tracks
No.	Title	Writer(s)	Producer(s)	Length
9.	"Senyawa"	Farouk Roman, Senna	Farouk Roman	4:46
10.	"Kalau Berkasih" (duet with Awie)	Glow	Glowrush, Tam Cobain, Mike Chan	3:36
11.	"Nadi"	Mim Hamzah, Illi Diyana	Genervie Kam	3:40
12.	"Kusedari"	Siti Nurhaliza, Habsah Hassan	Cha'an	4:03
Total length:				46:00

== Personnel ==
Credits adapted from Sitism booklet liner notes.

Performers and musicians

- Aditya – guitar (track 5)
- Arthur Kam – drums (track 5)
- Asraf Asimudin – bass (track 9)
- Awie – vocals (track 10)
- Bajai – piano (track 9)
- Barsena Bestandhi – background vocals (track 7)
- Bel Janni – background vocals (track 8)
- Bella Iris – background vocals (track 2)
- Bobo – bass (track 5)
- Budapest Scoring Symphonic Orchestra – strings (track 1, 3)
- Cha'an – piano, synthesizer (track 12)
- Dave Kitzkinki – guitar (track 9)
- Don Mukri – loops, synthesizer (track 12)
- Farazilla Jabar – background vocals (track 6)
- Farouk Roman – background vocals (track 9)
- Genervie Kam – piano, viola (track 11)
- Jadlobo – background vocals (track 12)
- Jenk Ali – strings (track 9), drums (track 12)
- Jova Devito – background vocals (track 8)
- Juwita Suwito – background vocals (track 3)
- Lin Jae Sern – viola (track 5)
- Mas Dewangga – all instruments, background vocals (track 8)
- Mattao – background vocals (track 6)
- MyaNana – background vocals (track 5)
- Nao Zumar – background vocals (track 4)
- Penn – bass (track 12)
- Rishanda Singgih – bass (track 7)
- Rushdan Ashri – keyboards, bass, drums (track 10)
- Sharon Paul – piano (track 5)
- Siti Nurhaliza – vocals (track 1–12), background vocals (track 9)
- Tagi – strings (track 9)
- Tam Cobain – guitar, background vocals (track 3, 10)
- Ujang Exists – drums (track 9)

Technical

- Aden King – composer (track 8)
- Ahmad Fedtri Yahya – lyrics (track 6)
- Amir Hasan – lyrics (track 4)
- Andi Rianto – producer, composer, arranger, vocal coach, conductor (track 7)
- Ari Renaldi – mixing (track 1, 3, 7), mastering (track 7)
- Aubrey Suwito – producer, arranger, instrumentation, programmer, recorder (track 1, 3), composer (track 3)
- Cha'an – producer, arranger (track 12)
- Farez Asmadi – arranger, recorder (track 6)
- Farouk Roman – producer, composer (track 9)
- Felix Voon – mixing (track 2)
- Genervie Kam – producer, arranger (track 11)
- Glowrush – composer, lyrics (track 10)
- Greg Henderson – mixing (track 5, 12)
- Habsah Hassan – lyrics (track 12)
- Huzai – mixing (track 9)
- Illi Diyana – composer, lyrics (track 11)
- Jay Franco – mastering (track 1–6, 8–12)
- Jova Devito – composer, lyrics (track 8)
- Keith Yong – recorder (track 1, 3)
- Koh Kok Boon – arranger, mixing (track 11)
- Luca Sickta – producer, composer, lyrics, arranger (track 2)
- Melly Goeslaw – composer, lyrics (track 1)
- Mike Chan – composer, lyrics (track 10)
- Mim Hamzah – composer, lyrics (track 11)
- Mingaling – producer, composer, mixing (track 4)
- Nuha Nik – composer, lyrics, mixing (track 4)
- Reza Ramsey – arranger (track 9)
- Rozisangdewi – lyrics (track 3, 5)
- Rudy Nastia – co-producer, composer, arranger, recorder (track 6)
- Sekar Ayu Asmara – lyrics (track 7)
- Senna – lyrics (track 9)
- Sharon Paul – producer, composer, arranger (track 5)
- Siti Nurhaliza – composer (track 12)
- Sulton Abdul Azis – editor (track 7)
- Tam Cobain – composer, lyrics (track 10)
- Tomok – producer, composer (track 6)
- Ucop Classmates – mixing (track 6)
- Wong KS – mixing (track 8)

Credits

- Adam Luqman – promotion (social media)
- Adam Smith – management (branding)
- Aiman – promotion
- Aizuddin – management (digital)
- Anne Mukhtar – promotion
- Anz Izwan – editor
- Azim Mazlan – promotion
- Blackpepper Production – photography
- Brandon Chan – management (business)
- Epie Temerloh – make-up artist
- Erlmyra – stylist
- Farah Rizal – editor
- Feros Sayna – artists and repertoire chief, management
- Gillian Kok – artists and repertoire (Universal Music Group)
- Gizmo – promotion
- Hermond Cheng – artists and repertoire manager
- Irfan Ramos – editor
- Ivan Koh – creative director
- Izzat Izani – artists and repertoire (Universal Music Group)
- John Teh – management (digital)
- Kassie Ashburn – editor
- Khairul Azmir – management (artist)
- Kim Lim – executive producer
- Mior Hanif – editor
- Muhd Azhar – editor
- Nadiah Ramli – management (artist)
- Nurul Afifah – promotion (social media)
- Popo – promotion
- Rauna Jud – design concept, artwork, art direction, stylist
- Robert Kok – management (digital)
- Rozi Abdul Razak – artists and repertoire, coordinator, management (artist), promotion
- Samm Republic – stylist
- Sharifah Amirah – promotion
- Shu Han – management (artist)
- Siti Fairuz – promotion
- Siti Norsaida Tarudin – management (finance)
- Siti Nurhaliza – executive producer
- Syed Azleem – artists and repertoire (Universal Music Group)

== Certification ==
Country	Certification	Sales/Shipments
Malaysia^{Deluxe Edition}	Sold out	1,000

== Release history ==
Region	Release date	Format	Label
Malaysia	30 June 2023; 8 September 2023 (Deluxe version)	CD, digital download	Universal Music Group (Malaysia)
Singapore	30 June 2023; 8 September 2023 (Deluxe version)	CD, digital download	Universal Music Group (Malaysia)
Brunei	30 June 2023; 8 September 2023 (Deluxe version)	CD, digital download	Universal Music Group (Malaysia)
Worldwide	30 June 2023; 8 September 2023 (Deluxe version)	digital download	Universal Music Group (Malaysia)
Indonesia	30 June 2023; 8 September 2023 (Deluxe version)	digital download	Universal Music Group (Indonesia)
Indonesia	August 2023	digital download	Universal Music Group (Indonesia)
Indonesia	August 2023	CD	Universal Music Group (Indonesia)
Japan	30 October 2023	CD	Universal Music Group
