= 9th Jakarta International Film Festival =

2007 film festival

- Opening film: Persepolis by Marjane Satrapi and Vincent Paronnaud
- Closing film: Chants of Lotus
- Location: Jakarta, Indonesia
- Founded: 1999
- Festival date: 7–16 December 2007

The 9th Jakarta International Film Festival took place from 7 to 16 December 2007 in Jakarta, Indonesia. The festival opened with Persepolis by Marjane Satrapi and Vincent Paronnaud, marking it the first animated film to open the festival. It closed with anthology film Chants of Lotus by Indonesian women directors Fatimah Tobing, Lasja F. Susatyo, Nia Dinata, and Upi. It marks the first Indonesian film to close the festival.

== Official selection ==
=== Opening and closing films ===
English title	Original title	Director(s)	Production countrie(s)
Persepolis (opening film)		Marjane Satrapi, Vincent Paronnaud	France, United States
Chants of Lotus (closing film)	Perempuan Punya Cerita	Various: Fatimah Tobing; Lasja F. Susatyo; Nia Dinata; Upi	Indonesia

=== Special Premieres ===
English title	Original title	Director(s)	Production countrie(s)
881		Royston Tan	Singapore
The Conductors		Andibachtiar Yusuf	Indonesia

=== World Cinema ===
English title	Original title	Director(s)	Production countrie(s)
4 Months, 3 Weeks and 2 Days	4 luni, 3 săptămâni și 2 zile	Cristian Mungiu	Romania
Atonement		Joe Wright	United Kingdom
Golden Door	Nuovomondo	Emanuele Crialese	Italy, Germany, France
Into the Wild		Sean Penn	United States
La Vie en Rose	La Môme	Olivier Dahan	France, United Kingdom, Czech Republic
Love and Honor	武士の一分	Yoji Yamada	Japan
A Mighty Heart		Michael Winterbottom	United States, United Kingdom
The Missing Star	La Stella che non c'è	Gianni Amelio	Italy, France, Switzerland, Singapore
The Namesake		Mira Nair	India, United States
No Country for Old Men		Ethan Coen, Joel Coen	United States
Shake Hands with the Devil		Roger Spottiswoode	Canada
Waiter	Ober	Alex van Warmerdam	Netherlands, Belgium
The Year My Parents Went on Vacation	O Ano em Que Meus Pais Saíram de Férias	Cao Hamburger	Brazil

=== Panorama ===
English title	Original title	Director(s)	Production countrie(s)
2 Days in Paris		Julie Delpy	France, Germany
Chronicle of an Escape	Crónica de una fuga	Adrián Caetano	Argentina
Cyrano Fernández		Alberto Arvelo	Venezuela, Spain
Elizabeth: The Golden Age		Shekhar Kapur	United Kingdom, France
The Fall		Tarsem Singh	India, United Kingdom, United States
Four Minutes	Vier Minuten	Chris Kraus	Germany
A Guide to Recognizing Your Saints		Dito Montiel	United States
Hula Girls	フラガール	Lee Sang-il	Japan
The Minder	El Custodio	Rodrigo Moreno	Argentina, France, Germany, Uruguay
Possible Lives	Las Vidas posibles	Sandra Gugliotta	Argentina, Germany
Suely in the Sky	O Céu de Suely	Karim Aïnouz	Portugal, Germany, France, Brazil
Vitus		Fredi M. Murer	Switzerland
You Kill Me		John Dahl	United States

=== House of Docs ===
English title	Original title	Director(s)	Production countrie(s)
Afghan Muscles		Andreas Møl Dalsgaard	Denmark
Comrades in Dreams		Uli Gaulke	Germany
The Drown Sea	Laut yang Tenggelam	Yuslam Fikri Ansari	Indonesia
Deliver Us from Evil		Amy J. Berg	United States
Dixie Chicks: Shut Up and Sing		Barbara Kopple, Cecilia Peck	United States
Forever		Heddy Honigmann	Netherlands
Mystic Ball		Greg Hamilton	Canada, United States
Playing Between Elephants	Bermain di Antara Gajah	Aryo Danusiri	Indonesia
Please Vote for Me	请投我一票	Weijun Chen	China
Sicko		Michael Moore	United States
The U.S. vs. John Lennon		David Leaf, John Scheinfeld	United States
Wordplay		Patrick Creadon	United States

=== A View from the SEA ===
English title	Original title	Director(s)	Production countrie(s)
The Bet Collector	Kubrador	Jeffrey Jeturian	Philippines
The Blossoming of Maximo Oliveros	Ang Pagdadalaga ni Maximo Oliveros	Auraeus Solito	Philippines
Dancing Bells	Chalanggai	Deepak Kumaran Menon	Malaysia, Netherlands
Donsol		Adolfo Alix Jr.	Philippines
Flower in the Pocket		Liew Seng Tat	Malaysia
Invisible City		Tan Pin Pin	Singapore
The Last Communist	Lelaki Komunis Terakhir	Amir Muhammad	Malaysia
Love Conquers All		Tan Chui Mui	Malaysia, Netherlands
Mukhsin		Yasmin Ahmad	Malaysia
Paper Cannot Wrap Up Embers	Le papier ne peut pas envelopper la braise	Rithy Panh	Cambodia, France
Singapore GaGa		Tan Pin Pin	Singapore
Story of Pao	Chuyện của Pao	Ngô Quang Hải	Vietnam
The Truth Be Told: The Cases Against Supinya Klangnarong		Pimpaka Towira	Thailand
Village People Radio Show	Apa khabar orang kampung?	Amir Muhammad	Malaysia

=== Kino German ===
English title	Original title	Director(s)	Production countrie(s)
Grave Decisions	Wer früher stirbt ist länger tot	Marcus H. Rosenmüller	Germany
Pingpong		Mattias Luthardt	Germany
Requiem		Hans-Christian Schmid	Germany
Yella		Christian Petzold	Germany

=== Africa on Screen ===
English title	Original title	Director(s)	Production countrie(s)
Days of Glory	Indigènes	Rachid Bouchareb	France, Morocco, Algeria, Belgium
Faro, Goddess of the Waters	Faro, la reine des eaux	Salif Traoré	Mali, France, Canada, Burkina Faso, Germany
Kirikou and the Wild Beasts	Kirikou et les bêtes sauvages	Michel Ocelot, Bénédicte Galup	France, Vietnam, Latvia

=== World Cinema Fund ===
English title	Original title	Director(s)	Production countrie(s)
Acts of Men	Atos dos Homens	Kiko Goifman	Brazil, Germany, Netherlands
The Other	El Otro	Ariel Rotter	Argentina, France, Germany
A Perfect Day	يوم اخر	Joana Hadjithomas and Khalil Joreige	France, Lebanon, Germany
Rome Rather Than You	Roma wa la n'touma	Tariq Teguia	Algeria, France, Germany

=== AFI Project: 20/20 ===
English title	Original title	Director(s)	Production countrie(s)
American Fork		Chris Bowman	United States
Big Rig		Doug Pray	United States
Spine Tingler! The William Castle Story		Jeffrey Schwarz	United States

=== Cinema Italiano ===
English title	Original title	Director(s)	Production countrie(s)
Along the Ridge	Anche libero va bene	Kim Rossi Stuart	Italy
The Night Before Finals	Notte prima degli esami	Fausto Brizzi	Italy
Saimir		Francesco Munzi	Italy

=== Indonesian Feature Film Competition ===
English title	Original title	Director(s)
3 Days to Eternity	3 Hari Untuk Selamanya	Riri Riza
6:30		Rinaldy Puspoyo
Anak-Anak Borobudur		Arswendo Atmowiloto
Badai Pasti Berlalu		Teddy Soeriaatmadja
Bukan Bintang Biasa: the Movie		Lasja F. Susatyo
The Chanting	Kuntilanak	Rizal Mantovani
Cinta Pertama		Nayato Fio Nuala
Cintapuccino		Rudy Soedjarwo
Coklat Stroberi		Ardy Octaviand
The Crawling Nurse	Suster Ngesot	Arie Azis
D'Bijis		Rako Prijanto
Dead Time: Kala		Joko Anwar
Dunia Mereka		Lasja F. Susastyo
Hantu		Adrianto Sinaga
Hantu Bangku Kosong		Helfi Kardit
Hantu Jeruk Purut		Koya Pagayo
Jakarta Undercover		Lance
Kamulah Satu-Satunya		Hanung Bramantyo
Kangen		Nayato Fio Nuala
KM 14		Ben Hernandez
Lantai 13		Helfi Kardit
Lawang Sewu: Dendam Kuntilanak		Arie Azis
Leak		Achiel Nasrun
Lewat Tengah Malam		Koya Pagayo
Long Road to Heaven		Enison Sinaro
Love Is Cinta		Hanny Saputra
Maaf, Saya Menghamili Istri Anda		Monty Tiwa
Malam Jumat Kliwon		Koya Pagayo
Mengejar Mas-Mas		Rudy Soedjarwo
Merah Itu Cinta		Rako Prijanto
Nagabonar Jadi 2		Deddy Mizwar
Pesan dari Surga		Sekar Ayu Asmara
The Photograph		Nan Achnas
Pocong 2		Rudy Soedjarwo
Sang Dewi		Dwi Ilalang
Selamanya		Ody C. Harahap
Suster N		Viva Westi
Terowongan Casablanca		Nanang Istiabudi
