= Vengeance Is Mine, All Others Pay Cash (film) =

2021 Indonesian film

- Theatrical release poster
- Indonesian: Seperti Dendam, Rindu Harus Dibayar Tuntas
- Directed by: Edwin
- Screenplay by: Edwin; Eka Kurniawan
- Based on: Vengeance Is Mine, All Others Pay Cash by Eka Kurniawan
- Produced by: Meiske Taurisia; Muhammad Zaidy
- Starring: Marthino Lio; Ladya Cheryl; Sal Priadi; Reza Rahadian; Ratu Felisha
- Cinematography: Akiko Ashizawa
- Edited by: Lee Chatametikool
- Music by: Dave Lumenta
- Production companies: Palari Films; Phoenix Films; E&W Films; Match Factory Productions; Bombero International; Kaninga Pictures
- Release dates: 8 August 2021 (Locarno Film Festival); 2 December 2021 (Indonesia)
- Running time: 114 minutes
- Country: Indonesia
- Language: Indonesian

Vengeance Is Mine, All Others Pay Cash (Indonesian: Seperti Dendam, Rindu Harus Dibayar Tuntas) is a 2021 Indonesian action black comedy-drama film directed by Edwin, who also co-wrote the screenplay with Eka Kurniawan based on Kurniawan's best-selling book of the same name. It stars Marthino Lio, Ladya Cheryl, Sal Priadi, Reza Rahadian and Ratu Felisha.

The film had its world premiere at the main competition of the 74th Locarno Film Festival on 8 August 2021, where it won the Golden Leopard (the festival's top prize). It was theatrically released in Indonesia on 2 December 2021. At the 42nd Citra Awards, Edwin won his second Best Director award, while the film won a total of 5 awards out of 12 nominations.

== Plot ==
Set in the 1980s in an Indonesian society ruled by machismo, a hibernating "bird" becomes a serious matter. In a life of brutality, the sleeping bird is an allegory for a peaceful and serene life, even when the whole world tries desperately to rouse it.

== Cast ==
- Marthino Lio as Ajo Kawir
- Ladya Cheryl as Iteung
- Sal Priadi as Tokek
- Reza Rahadian as Budi Baik
- Ratu Felisha as Jelita
- Kevin Ardilova as Mono Ompong
- Lukman Sardi as Codet
- Eduwart Manalu as Kumis
- Djenar Maesa Ayu as Rona Merah
- Kiki Narendra as Kumbang
- Piet Pagau as Paman Gembul
- Yudi Ahmad Tajudin as Iwan Angsa
- Ayu Laksmi as Wa Sami
- Christine Hakim as Mak Jerot
- Cecep Arif Rahman as Ki Jempes

== Production ==
=== Development ===
In May 2016, Palari Films announced that they had secured the rights to adapt Eka Kurniawan's third novel Vengeance Is Mine, All Others Pay Cash with Edwin on board to direct alongside collaborators Muhammad Zaidy and Meiske Taurisia as producers. However, as the efforts to adapt the novelproved to be more challenging than expected, Edwin proposed to Palari Films that they pursue another project together while working on the adaptation, which turned out to be Laksmi Pamuntjak's 2014 novel The Birdwoman's Palate, leading to Edwin's 2018 feature Aruna & Her Palate.

To raise funds for the film, the film script was submitted to compete in international grant competitions as the production team believed it has an international appeal. In 2016, the script won a US$15,000 grant for winning the Most Promising Project Award at the Asian Project Market held during the 2016 Busan International Film Festival in South Korea. In 2018, it received a post-production grant from the post-production lab White Light Post at the Hong Kong Asian Film Financing Forum as well as a co-production grant from the Singapore Film Commission. It also received another production grant from Bangkok-based Purin Pictures.

=== Casting ===
The film marks the return of Edwin's frequent collaborator Ladya Cheryl to the big screen since her last appearance in a feature film in 2012's Postcards from the Zoo, also directed by Edwin. In an interview with The Hollywood Reporter, Edwin said that Cheryl's portrayal of Iteung is inspired by 80's action star Cynthia Rothrock. Singer-songwriter Sal Priadi makes his feature film debut alongside Ratu Felisha and Citra Award winner Reza Rahadian in supporting roles.

== Release ==
In July 2021, Variety reported that art house agency The Match Factory had acquired the film's distribution rights. The film had its world premiere at the 74th Locarno Film Festival on 8 August 2021, where it won the Golden Leopard. The film screened in the Contemporary World Cinema section of the 46th Toronto International Film Festival. It was screened at the Filmfest Hamburg and 26th Busan International Film Festival in October 2021. Vengeance Is Mine, All Others Pay Cash was also screened at the BFI London Film Festival 2021 during the Dare section.

The film was released theatrically in Indonesia on 2 December 2021.

== Reception ==
=== Box office ===
Vengeance Is Mine, All Other Pay Cash recorded a total of 85,004 admissions throughout its theatrical release in Indonesia, ranking it in the 11th spot among all domestic productions released in 2021.

=== Critical response ===
Writing for Variety, Jay Weissberg wrote that the film "delivers a withering critique of masculinity" while managing to be "enjoyable". However, Weissberg was critical of the screenplay, noting that Edwin and co-writer Kurniawan "cram rather too many meandering plot lines". Also for Variety, Diego Cepeda and Calin Boto called the film "a genre-bending portrayal of an angry impotent young man stuck in the middle of the macho Indonesian Eighties", referring to the film's main character Ajo Kawir and heavy influence of 80's pop culture. Marta Bałaga of Cineuropa praised the film's "central romance" between Ajo Kawir and Iteung as "the most fun to watch", singling out Cheryl's portrayal of Iteung as a stand-out. Similar to Weissberg, Bałaga also criticized the film's editing, calling it "very uneven, going from funny to dark to just weird, as if the editing couldn't keep up with the ongoing brainstorming session".

== Awards and nominations ==
Year	Award	Category	Recipient	Result	Notes
2021	Locarno Film Festival	Golden Leopard for Best Film	Edwin	Won	
2021	Three Continents Festival	Golden Montgolfiere for Best Film	Edwin	Nominated	
2021	25th Online Film Critics Society Awards	Best Non-US Release	Vengeance Is Mine, All Others Pay Cash	Won	
2021	Valladolid International Film Festival	Golden Spike	Edwin	Nominated	
2021	Valladolid International Film Festival	Best Director of Photography	Akiko Ashizawa	Won	
2021	14th Asia Pacific Screen Awards	Achievement in Cinematography	Akiko Ashizawa	Nominated	
2021	16th Jogja-NETPAC Asian Film Festival	Silver Harnoman	Edwin	Won	
2021	5th Tempo Film Festival	Best Film	Vengeance Is Mine, All Others Pay Cash	Nominated	
2021	5th Tempo Film Festival	Best Director	Edwin	Nominated	
2021	5th Tempo Film Festival	Best Actor	Marthino Lio	Nominated	
2021	5th Tempo Film Festival	Best Actress	Ladya Cheryl	Nominated	
2021	5th Tempo Film Festival	Best Supporting Actor	Reza Rahadian	Nominated	
2021	5th Tempo Film Festival	Best Supporting Actress	Ratu Felisha	Nominated	
2022	International Film Festival of Kerala	World Cinema	Edwin	Nominated	
2022	10th Maya Awards	Best Feature Film	Meiske Taurisia; Muhammad Zaidy	Nominated	
2022	10th Maya Awards	Best Director	Edwin	Nominated	
2022	10th Maya Awards	Best Actor in a Leading Role	Marthino Lio	Won	
2022	10th Maya Awards	Best Actress in a Leading Role	Ladya Cheryl	Nominated	
2022	10th Maya Awards	Best Actor in a Supporting Role	Reza Rahadian	Won	
2022	10th Maya Awards	Best Actress in a Supporting Role	Ratu Felisha	Nominated	
2022	10th Maya Awards	Best New Actor	Sal Priadi	Nominated	
2022	10th Maya Awards	Best Adapted Screenplay	Edwin Eka Kurniawan	Nominated	
2022	10th Maya Awards	Best Cinematography	Akiko Ashizawa	Nominated	
2022	10th Maya Awards	Best Editing	Lee Chatametikool	Nominated	
2022	10th Maya Awards	Best Original	Dave Lumenta	Nominated	
2022	10th Maya Awards	Best Theme Song	Dave Lumenta; Indra Perkasa; Bonnie Rubin	Nominated	Bangun Bajingan! ("Get Up, Bitch!", Performed by Ananda Badudu & Rubina)
2022	10th Maya Awards	Best Art Direction	Eros Eflin	Won	
2022	10th Maya Awards	Best Makeup & Hairstyling	Cherry Wirawan	Won	
2022	10th Maya Awards	Best Special Effects	Rivai Chen	Nominated	
2022	10th Maya Awards	Best Poster Design	Ferancis	Nominated	
2022	10th Maya Awards	Best Costume Design	Gemailla Gea	Won	
2022	42nd Citra Awards	Best Picture	Meiske Taurisia; Muhammad Zaidy	Nominated	
2022	42nd Citra Awards	Best Director	Edwin	Won	
2022	42nd Citra Awards	Best Actor	Marthino Lio	Won	
2022	42nd Citra Awards	Best Actress	Ladya Cheryl	Won	
2022	42nd Citra Awards	Best Supporting Actor	Reza Rahadian	Nominated	
2022	42nd Citra Awards	Best Supporting Actress	Ratu Felisha	Nominated	
2022	42nd Citra Awards	Best Adapted Screenplay	Edwin Eka Kurniawan	Won	
2022	42nd Citra Awards	Best Original Score	Dave Lumenta	Nominated	
2022	42nd Citra Awards	Best Original Song	Dave Lumenta	Nominated	Bangun Bajingan! ("Get Up, Bitch!", Performed by Ananda Badudu & Rubina)
2022	42nd Citra Awards	Best Costume Design	Gemailla Gea	Won	
2022	42nd Citra Awards	Best Art Direction	Eros Eflin	Nominated	
2022	42nd Citra Awards	Best Makeup & Hairstyling	Cherry Wirawan	Nominated	
2022	35th Bandung Film Festival	Best Film	Vengeance Is Mine, All Others Pay Cash	Nominated	
2022	35th Bandung Film Festival	Best Director	Edwin	Nominated	
2022	35th Bandung Film Festival	Best Actor	Marthino Lio	Won	
2022	35th Bandung Film Festival	Best Actress	Ladya Cheryl	Nominated	
2022	35th Bandung Film Festival	Best Original Score	Dave Lumenta	Nominated	
2022	35th Bandung Film Festival	Best Art Direction	Eros Eflin	Won	
2022	16th Indonesian Movie Awards	Best Ensemble	Vengeance Is Mine, All Others Pay Cash	Won	
2022	16th Indonesian Movie Awards	Favorite Film	Vengeance Is Mine, All Others Pay Cash	Nominated	
2022	16th Indonesian Movie Awards	Best Actor	Marthino Lio	Won	
2022	16th Indonesian Movie Awards	Favorite Actor	Marthino Lio	Nominated	
2022	16th Indonesian Movie Awards	Best Actress	Ladya Cheryl	Nominated	
2022	16th Indonesian Movie Awards	Favorite Actress	Ladya Cheryl	Nominated	
2022	16th Indonesian Movie Awards	Best Supporting Actor	Reza Rahadian	Nominated	
2022	16th Indonesian Movie Awards	Favorite Supporting Actor	Reza Rahadian	Won	
2022	16th Indonesian Movie Awards	Best Supporting Actress	Ratu Felisha	Nominated	
2022	16th Indonesian Movie Awards	Favorite Supporting Actress	Ratu Felisha	Nominated	
2022	16th Indonesian Movie Awards	Best Newcomer	Sal Priadi	Won	
2022	16th Indonesian Movie Awards	Favorite Newcomer	Sal Priadi	Nominated	
2022	16th Indonesian Movie Awards	Best Chemistry	Marthino Lio; Ladya Cheryl	Nominated	
