= Sal Priadi =

Indonesian singer and actor (born 1992)

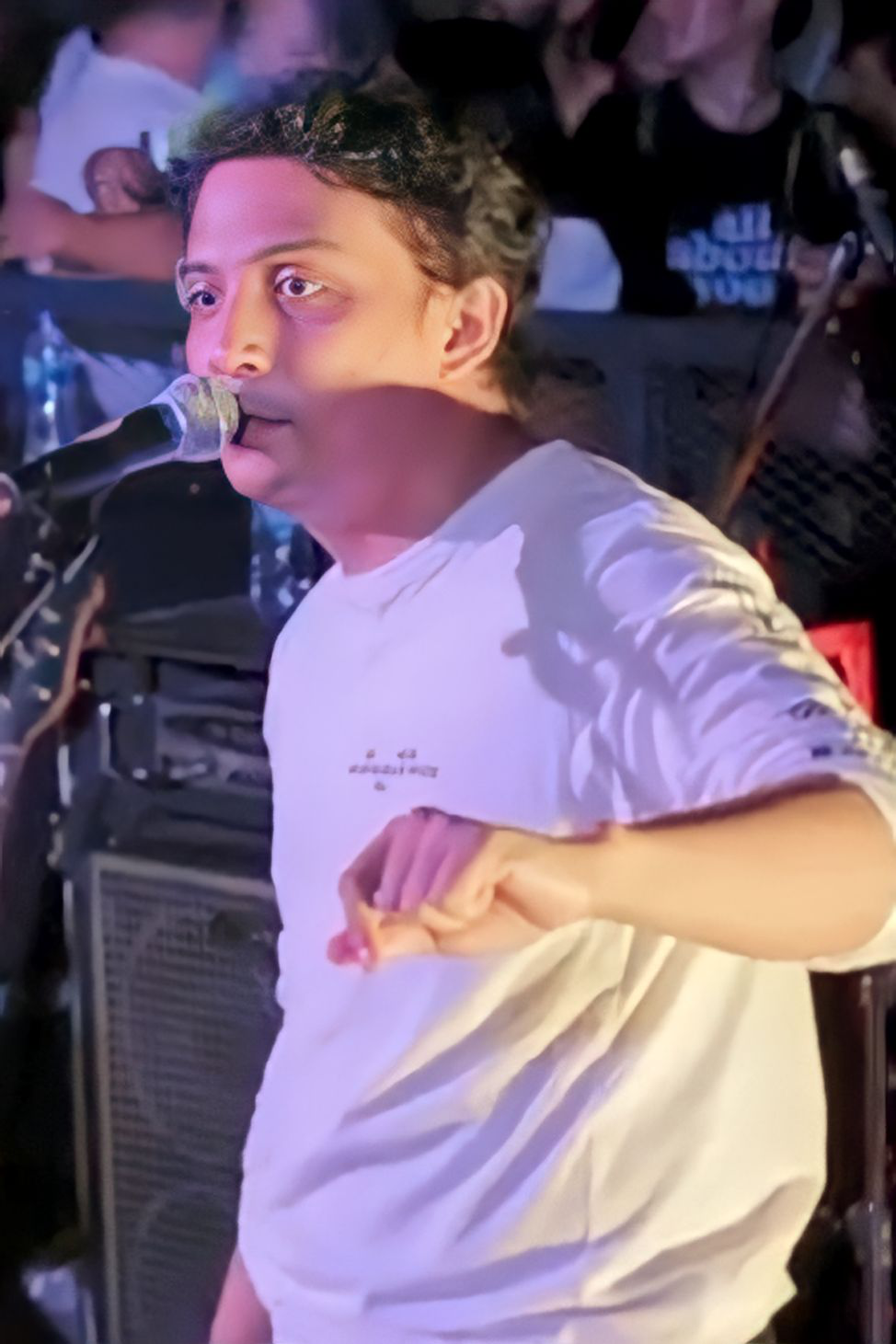
- Priadi performing in 2020
- Born: Salmantyo Ashrizky Priadi; 30 April 1992 (age 34); Malang, East Java, Indonesia
- Occupations: Singer; songwriter; actor
- Years active: 2015–present
- Spouse: Sarah Deshita (m. 2019)
- Children: 1
- Musical career
- Genres: Pop
- Instruments: Vocals; guitar
- Labels: Orang Pertunjukan; Kijn

Salmantyo "Sal" Ashrizky Priadi (born 30 April 1992) is an Indonesian singer-songwriter and actor. He released his debut studio album, Berhati in 2020, followed by MARKERS AND SUCH PENS FLASHDISKS in 2024. As an actor, he has starred in various films, including the Locarno-winning Vengeance Is Mine, All Others Pay Cash (2021) and Yosep Anggi Noen's 24 Hours with Gaspar (2023).

Priadi has received seven Anugerah Musik Indonesia nominations and an Indonesian Film Festival nomination for Best Theme Song. Aside from his music career, Sal Priadi has also ventured into acting, including a role in the 2021 film "Seperti Dendam, Rindu Harus Dibayar Tuntas". His background and journey highlight his dedication to exploring various artistic avenues in Indonesia's entertainment industry.

== Early life ==
Priadi was born on 30 April 1992 in Malang, East Java, Indonesia. His interest in music began in middle school when he formed a band with his friends to perform at school events. During his high school years, he formed an emo band and began writing songs. In 2015, Priadi started uploading covers and original songs on his SoundCloud account with the help from Mahatamtama and Derry of indie pop group Coldiac. His musical style includes Indie Indonesia, Sophisti Pop, Pop Kontemporer, R&B, Art Pop, Folk, and Funk.

In 2017, he released his debut single titled "Kultusan" through GZZ Records, marking the beginning of his journey as a solo artist. His second single, "Ikat Aku di Tulang Belikatmu", gained significant attention and led to a nomination for Best Solo Male Pop Artist at the 2018 Anugerah Musik Indonesia. He continued to release music, and in 2020, he launched his first studio album called "Berhati" under the production of Ari Renaldi.

== Career ==
=== 2017–2020: Berhati ===
In 2017, Priadi released his debut single "Kultusan" through GZZ Records. It was followed by his second single "Ikat Aku di Tulang Belikatmu" on 8 June 2018. The single led Sal to receive a nomination for Best Solo Male Pop Artist at the 2018 Anugerah Musik Indonesia. In 2018, he released follow-up single "Melebur Semesta", which was nominated for Best Alternative Solo Artist at the 2019 Anugerah Musik Indonesia. He then moved to Jakarta from Malang to focus on developing his music career. His fourth single, "Jangan Bertengkar Lagi Ya? OK? OK!" was released in 2019 and produced by pop singer Pamungkas. He released a single "Amin Paling Serius", featuring indie folk singer Nadin Amizah on 29 May 2019. It peaked at number six on the Billboard Indonesia Top 100. In July 2019, he was featured on Hindia's single "Belum Tidur" from his debut studio album, Menari dengan Bayangan.

Priadi released his debut studio album Berhati on 24 February 2020.

=== 2020–2023: MARKERS AND SUCH and acting debut ===
Priadi released the single "Irama Laot Teduh", produced by Ari Renaldi, on 9 July 2020. It was intended to be the lead single of his now-unrealized extended play Kumpulan Lagu Cinta. On 8 October 2020, he released a single "Misteri Minggu Pagi" about being ghosted the day after going on a date. In November 2020, Palari Films announced that Priadi would star in Edwin's Vengeance Is Mine, All Others Pay Cash, an adaptation of the novel of the same name. On 19 February 2021, he released a single "Serta Mulia" about a celebration which was inspired by his first wedding anniversary. It was released alongside a website where his fans could request personalized greetings from him. Priadi partnered with IM3 Ooredoo to release a single "Bulan Yang Baik" about spending a second Ramadan during the COVID-19 pandemic on 23 April 2021.

He released his debut extended play, titled MARKERS AND SUCH on 18 March 2022. It encapsulates his life after getting married and having a child. In August 2022, it was announced that he would join the cast of Yosep Anggi Noen's crime drama film 24 Hours with Gaspar, alongside Reza Rahardian, Shenina Cinnamon, and Laura Basuki. In November 2022, he wrote and recorded "Ambilkan Bintang" as the soundtrack for the film Autobiography, which led him to a Citra Award nomination for Best Theme Song at the 2022 Indonesian Film Festival. In May 2023, he released a single "Besok kita pergi makan", which reflects on spending time with loved ones amidst a busy schedule. In July 2023, Priadi starred in Umay Shahab's drama film When It Stops Here. He released a cover of Bebi Romeo-penned Krisdayanti's 2000 single "Mencintaimu" on 27 October 2023.

=== 2024–present: MARKERS AND SUCH PENS FLASHDISKS ===
On 8 March 2024, Priadi announced his sophomore studio album, MARKERS AND SUCH PENS FLASHDISKS as a continuation of his previous extended play. He also released the lead single, "Dari planet lain". He then released three additional singles from the album on a weekly basis throughout March: "Yasudah" on the 15th, "Episode" on the 22nd, and "Foto kita blur" on the 29th. The album was released on 30 April 2024, alongside the music video of "Semua lagu cinta" starring Tara Basro and Ken Danuja. "Gala bunga matahari", a track dedicated to commemorating those who have died, was released a single on 24 June 2024. It garnered commercial success, topped the weekly Spotify Top 50 Indonesian chart and peaked at number three on Billboard Indonesia Songs. In 2024, Priadi won his first Anugerah Musik Indonesia award for Best Male Pop Solo Artist for "Gala bunga matahari".

In 2025, he was set to star in Edwin's fantasy horror film Sleep No More.

== Discography ==
=== Studio albums ===
- Berhati (2020)
- MARKERS AND SUCH PENS AND FLASHDISKS (2024)

=== Extended plays ===
- MARKERS AND SUCH (2022)

=== Singles ===
As lead artist

Title	Year	Album
"Kultusan"	2017	Berhati
"Ikat Aku di Tulang Belikatmu"	2018	Berhati
"Melebur Semesta"	2018	Berhati
"Jangan Bertengkar Lagi Ya? OK? OK!"	2019	Non-album single
"Amin Paling Serius" (with Nadin Amizah)	2019	Berhati
"Nyala"	2020	Berhati
"Irama Laot Teduh"	2020	Non-album singles
"Misteri Minggu Pagi"	2020	Non-album singles
"Serta Mulia"	2021	Non-album singles
"Bulan yang Baik"	2021	Non-album singles
"Kita usahakan rumah itu"	2022	MARKERS AND SUCH; MARKERS AND SUCH PENS AND FLASHDISKS
"Ambilkan Bintang"	2022	Non-album singles
"Besok kita pergi makan"	2023	Non-album singles
"Mencintaimu"	2023	Non-album singles
"Dari planet lain"	2024	MARKERS AND SUCH PENS FLASHDISKS
"Yasudah"	2024	MARKERS AND SUCH PENS FLASHDISKS
"Episode"	2024	MARKERS AND SUCH PENS FLASHDISKS
"Foto kita blur"	2024	MARKERS AND SUCH PENS FLASHDISKS
"Semua lagu cinta"	2024	MARKERS AND SUCH PENS FLASHDISKS
"Gala bunga matahari"	2024	MARKERS AND SUCH PENS FLASHDISKS

As featured artist

Title	Year	Album
"Belum Tidur" (Hindia featuring Sal Priadi)	2019	Menari dengan Bayangan
"Katedral Tiongkok" (Sajama Cut featuring Sal Priadi)	2022	You Can Be Anyone You Want – A Tribute to Sajama Cut

== Acting credits ==
=== Film ===
Year	Title	Role	Notes
2021	Vengeance Is Mine, All Others Pay Cash	Tokek	
2023	When It Stops Here	Awan Ambara	
2024	24 Hours with Gaspar	Yadi	
2025	Sleep No More	Rudi	Post-production

=== Television ===
Year	Title	Role	Notes
2021	Imperfect the Series	Gilang	Episode: "Huru Hara Penghuni Baru"
2024	Joko Anwar's Nightmares and Daydreams	Bambang	Episode: "Old House"

=== Theatre ===
Year	Production	Role	Location
2020	Anugerah Terindah	Hed	Exclusive Mola programming
2022	Setelah Lewat Djam Malam	Puja	Graha Bhakti Budaya, Taman Ismail Marzuki, Jakarta; 2–3 December 2022
