= Menjaga Cintamu =

Single by Siti Nurhaliza

from the album Sitism
- Released: 18 May 2023
- Recorded: March 2023
- Genre: Pop
- Length: 4:06
- Label: Siti Nurhaliza Productions; Universal Music Group (Malaysia)
- Songwriters: Andi Rianto; Sekar Ayu Asmara
- Producer: Andi Rianto

Siti Nurhaliza singles chronology
"Anakanda" (2021)	"Menjaga Cintamu" (2023)	"Romansa Kita" (2023)

"Menjaga Cintamu" (transl. "Taking Care of Your Love") is a song by Malaysian singer Siti Nurhaliza, released on 18 May 2023 as the first single from her twentieth studio album, Sitism (2023). The song, which was composed by Andi Rianto and lyrics by Sekar Ayu Asmara, serves as the theme song of 2023 film, Anwar: The Untold Story. A music video was filmed and released to promote the single, which was directed by Viva Westi.

== Production ==
Recording of "Menjaga Cintamu" was begun in March 2023. Its composer, Andi Rianto disclosed that he was impressed with Siti, who took one hour to record the song. He recalled, "After finished the demo for the song, I sent it to Siti and she likes it. In March, I flew to Malaysia for a recording session". The song was inspired by the true events of Anwar Ibrahim and Wan Azizah Wan Ismail during the Reformasi in 1998. Siti said that the she was attracted with the song's messages, while understands that its lyrics "more to a wife's sacrifice and unparalleled love". (Note: Original: "...lebih kepada pengorbanan seorang isteri dan cinta yang tiada tolok bandingan".)

== Format and track listing ==
- Digital download
1. "Menjaga Cintamu" – 4:06

== Release history ==
Country	Date	Format	Label
Malaysia	18 May 2023	Digital download; streaming	Siti Nurhaliza Productions; Universal Music Malaysia
