= Chendra Effendy Panatan =

Indonesian artist

Chendra Effendy Panatan (born January 7, 1969, Jakarta, Indonesia) is an Indonesian artist. He started his dance training at Sumber Cipta Ballet Jakarta and studied furthermore at Ecola de la Dance Geneva, Lines Contemporary Ballet, San Francisco, United States, Concordia University, Montreal, Canada, Limon Institute, NYC – USA, and Internationale Sommerakademie des Tanzes in Koln, Germany.

== Background ==
Obtained experience in dancing with many local and international choreographers, such as Farida Oetoyo, Iko Sidharta, Sukardji Sriman, Yanti Aranditio, Maxine Heppner, Dislav Zielienski (Canada), Edmund Gaerlan (Philippines), Olivier Patey (France), Jurgen Otte (Netherlands), Howard W. Lark (United States), Joh Seongjoo (South Korea), and Angela Liong (Singapore). He performed in major dance events, such as Indonesian Dance Festival, The Arts Summit Indonesia, GKJ International Festival, the inauguration of Esplanade-Singapore, Melbourne and Asia Comments - Copenhagen. As a professional dancer, he worked with Maxine Heppner and Dancers in Toronto – Canada in 1997 and “Arts Fission Dance Company”, Singapore in 2002.

His first contemporary work, A S A won the 1st prospective prize at the first contemporary choreography competition Gedung Kesenian Jakarta Awards 1997. ‘CONFLICT’, ESCape (dance video project), and P E R – T I W I (a dance theater were created when he studied at The Victorian College of The Arts, University of Melbourne – Australia for his graduate diploma in choreography, which finished in Nov 2000). Other works include PORT of CALL – the longing sense of possession, KOSA – Clara’s story – the dance piece inspired by the short story of Seno Gumira Ajidarma performed together with Maxine Heppner and Dancers in July 2002 in Jakarta. Exodus - (Wanita Yang Berlari) was his first dance film. This production was collaboration with a film director from Singapore. This short dance film was a runner up winner of audience selection at Q Film Festival in Jakarta (September 2003) and was invited to be screened for The International Rotterdam Film Festival in January 2004, Bangkok International Film Festival, Barcelona Film Festival in April 2004, Los Angeles Film Festival and many other festivals in Asia, Europe and USA. EXODUS won Malaysia Video Awards 2004 (Special Jury Prize), 6th International Panorama of Independent Filmmakers Greece 2004 (Best Experimental Film) and Special Jury Prize at Hong Kong International Film Festival 2005. In March 2005, Exodus also screened at the Institute of Contemporary Arts in London.

Besides as a dancer and choreographer, Chendra is a dance activist as well. He was the co-founder of Kreativitat Dance Indonesia – a contemporary dance company based in Jakarta. He is also the founder and artistic director of TARI Indonesia and METAdomus which set up in 2002 to promote Indonesian Performing Arts. The productions and activities of TARIIndonesia are dedicated to the development of Indonesia Performing Arts. TARIIndonesia was the initiator for the first international dance on screen festival ‘danc(E)motion’ in Jakarta in 2005. METAdomus is a new Contemporary Indonesia Music Group, which have performed in several cities in Indonesia and Nederland in 2002. Currently, he works as a dance teacher as well as an arts manager besides producing his new dance works. Chendra was invited to participate in tanzplatforum in Dusserdorf, Germany last Feb 2004 as the Indonesian representative. As an arts manager, he got a grant from Ford Foundation through Asialink and Kelola Foundation to do arts (dance) residency in Australia with One Extra Dance Company in Sydney and TasDance in Tasmania(ce).

He has worked with internationally renowned composers such as David del Puerto and Santiago Lanchares. Since 2005 Chendra closely collaborated with Indonesian prominent composer and pianist Ananda Sukarlan, producing works which have been performed both in Europe and Indonesia. Together they produced the first colossal Balinese dance "Kecak" in Spain, which made a big impact to the musical and dance world in Spain. Many Spanish composers have since then written works influenced by the rhythms of Kecak for Ananda Sukarlan.

His projects have been supported by national and international institutions such as Arts Network Asia, Australian Indonesian Institute, Ford Foundation, Jakarta Arts Council, British Council, Goethe Institut, Kelola Foundation and Asialink. After finishing his choreography studies at the Victorian College of The Arts, Melbourne University in 2000, he was awarded the ‘Chevening Scholarship’ to obtain his Master of Arts in Choreography at the Middlesex University, London in 2007. His large work, HAYATI, was created during his Chevening period, and performed in Jakarta in 2008. In 2009 together with Ananda Sukarlan he created the dance Bibirku Bersujud di Bibirmu, a new concept of music and dance performance based on a poem of the same name by Hasan Aspahani, performed at the Jakarta New Year's Concert 2010. He also collaborated with Ananda Sukarlan in two of his operas: Clara (2014, which was awarded the Best Performing Arts 2014 by the Tempo Magazine) and Tumirah (to be premiered in 2017), both based on stories by Seno Gumira Ajidarma. He founded the Yayasan Musik Sastra Indonesia (Indonesian Classical Music Foundation) together with Ananda Sukarlan, Pia Alisjahbana (founder of Femina Group) and Dedi Panigoro of Medco Group.

== See also ==
- Ananda Sukarlan
