= Secret Ingredient (disambiguation) =

A secret ingredient is a business practice to maintain competitive or advertising advantage.

Secret Ingredient or Secret Ingredients may also refer to:

- Secret Ingredient (film), 2017 Macedonian film
- Secret Ingredient (TV series), Philippine television series
- Secret Ingredients, 2018 documentary film by Jeffrey Smith and Amy Hart
