= Someone's Wife in the Boat of Someone's Husband =

2013 Korean-Indonesian drama film

- Directed by: Edwin
- Written by: Edwin; Seno Gumira Ajidarma
- Based on: Cinta di Atas Perahu Cadik by Seno Gumira Ajidarma
- Produced by: Meiske Taurisia
- Starring: Nicholas Saputra; Mariana Renata
- Cinematography: Amalia T. S.
- Production companies: Jeonju Digital Project; Babibutafilm
- Release date: April 26, 2013 (Jeonju)
- Countries: South Korea; Indonesia
- Language: Indonesian

Someone's Wife in the Boat of Someone's Husband is a 2013 Korean-Indonesian drama film directed by Edwin. Edwin co-wrote the screenplay with poet Seno Gumira Ajidarma based on Ajidarma's Cinta di Atas Perahu Cadik.

== Plot ==
Mar believes in the mysterious legend of the lovers Halimah and Sukab on the island of Sawai from a hundred years ago. She travels to Sawai to experience what Halimah once felt, hoping to find Sukab there.

== Cast ==
- Nicholas Saputra as Sukab
- Mariana Renata as Mar

== Production ==
Filming took place in Jakarta as well as Ambon and Masohi in Maluku. The project was a co-production by Babibuta Film and the Jeonju Digital Project.

== Release ==
It was released on 26 April 2013 at the Jeonju International Film Festival in South Korea as part of a project titled Strangers alongside Strangers When We Met, directed by Masahiro Kobayashi and Over There directed by Zhang Lü.
