= Interchange (film) =

2016 film by Dain Iskandar Said

- Directed by: Dain Iskandar Said
- Written by: Dain Iskandar Said; June Tan; Nandita Solomon; Redza Minhat
- Produced by: Nandita Solomon
- Starring: Shaheizy Sam; Iedil Putra; Prisia Nasution; Nicholas Saputra
- Cinematography: Jordan Chiam
- Edited by: Herman K Panca
- Production company: Apparat Sdn. Bhd.
- Distributed by: XYZ Films; (United States)
- Release dates: 5 August 2016 (Locarno); 1 December 2016 (Malaysia)
- Countries: Malaysia; Indonesia
- Languages: Malay; English
- Budget: MYR 3.5 million
- Box office: MYR 497,135

Interchange is a 2016 Malaysian-Indonesian Malay-language fantasy thriller film directed by Dain Iskandar Said and starring Shaheizy Sam, Nicholas Saputra, Prisia Nasution, Alvin Wong, and Iedil Putra.

The film premiered in the Locarno International Film Festival on 5 August 2016 and was released in Malaysian cinemas on the 1st of December of the same year.

== Cast ==
- Iedil Putra as Adam
- Shaheizy Sam as Detective Man
- Nicholas Saputra as Belian
- Prisia Nasution as Iva
- Nadiya Nisaa as Sain
- Alvin Wong as Detective Jason
- Chew Kin Wah as Heng
- Junad M. Nor
- Kaka Azraff as Melur

== Production ==
Dain Iskandar had written the draft of the script in a matter of three weeks while he was editing the footage for Bunohan in Bangkok, Thailand.
