= Legasi (Siti Nurhaliza album) =

Studio album by Siti Nurhaliza
- Released: 1 April 2021
- Recorded: March 2021
- Studios: Mixbro Records; Fouré Productions Studio; Pulse Studio; Pak Ngah Production
- Genre: Pop
- Length: 33:50
- Labels: Siti Nurhaliza Productions; Universal Music Group (Malaysia)
- Producers: Dato' Sri Siti Nurhaliza (executive), Kenny Ong (executive), Pown Hasril

Siti Nurhaliza chronology
ManifestaSITI2020 (2020)	Legasi (2021)	Sitism (2023)

Singles from Legasi
- 1. "Comel Pipi Merah" Released: 6 March 2018; 2. "Anakanda" Released: 26 April 2021

Legasi (Legacy) is a twentieth studio album and a special album by Malaysian singer, Siti Nurhaliza, released on 1 April 2021 by Siti Nurhaliza Productions and Universal Music Malaysia. It is also her first and only children's album.

== Recording and production ==
Idea for Legasi began when Siti Nurhaliza planned to release a children's album ahead of the birth of her second child. According to Siti, it is an effort to preserve classic children's songs so that they continue to be remembered and become a legacy for future generations. The recording process of Legasi was very complicated for Siti because she came to the recording studio while heavily pregnant, but she is satisfied with the result as the album has its own special features. The recording process of Legasi, according to Siti, is very different from her commercial albums.

For the album, Siti collaborated with Pown Hasril, who previously worked on her 2020 album, ManifestaSITI2020 to give a new and fresh touch to the entire song in the album. Legasi contains 10 songs including two additional lullabies. In the album, Siti also produced a special song dedicated to her unborn second child, which is titled "Anakanda". The first single, "Comel Pipi Merah" ("Adorable Rosy Cheeks"), which was released in 2018, also included in the album.

Siti recorded the album over three days in early March 2021, with her pregnancy entering its 8th month.

== Release and reception ==
Legasi was released on 1 April 2021, in conjunction with Siti Nurhaliza's 25 years of her music career. Two songs from the album, "Medley Klasik Siti 1" and "Anakanda" were made into music videos. The album was well-received, especially parents with young children, and has reached number one at iTunes Malaysia.

== Track listing ==
No.	Title	Length
1.	"Interlud 1"	1:00
2.	"Medley Klasik Siti Bhg. 1" ("Buai Laju-Laju"/"Pok Amai-Amai"/"Suriram"/"Bunga Matahari")	7:19
3.	"Burung Kakak Tua"	4:04
4.	"Bintang Kecil"	3:21
5.	"Interlud 2"	0:16
6.	"Anakku Sayangku"	3:40
7.	"Medley Klasik Siti Bhg. 2" ("Air Pasang Dalam"/"Lagu Tiga Kupang"/"Anak Odeng"/"Kalau Rasa Gembira")	5:43
8.	"Anakanda"	3:45
9.	"Comel Pipi Merah"	3:53
10.	"Interlud 3"	0:50
Total length:		33:50

== Release history ==
Region	Release date	Format	Label
Malaysia	1 April 2021	CD, Digital download,	Siti Nurhaliza Productions, Universal Music Group (Malaysia)
