= The Osaka Journals =

Studio album by Sajama Cut
- Released: August 25, 2005
- Genre: Indie
- Length: 39:05
- Label: The Bronze Medal Recording Company/Universal Music Indonesia
- Producer: Sajama Cut; Mr.Yosi

Sajama Cut chronology
Apologia (2002)	The Osaka Journals (2005)	Manimal (2010)

The Osaka Journals is the second album from Sajama Cut. It was released in 2005, with distribution help from the major label Universal Music Indonesia. Sajama Cut released 2 singles (and 2 videos) for "Fallen Japanese", and "Alibi".

The album received critical acclaim in the Indonesian media, with The Jakarta Post giving it a positive review.

== Track listing ==
1. Season Finale
2. Fallen Japanese
3. Alibi
4. Scarllet (Paramour)
5. It Was Kyoto, Where I Died
6. Take Care, Inamorata
7. Idol Semen
8. Lagu Tema
9. Nemesis/Murder
10. Fin
11. Less Afraid (bonus track)
