= Eka Kurniawan =

Indonesian writer

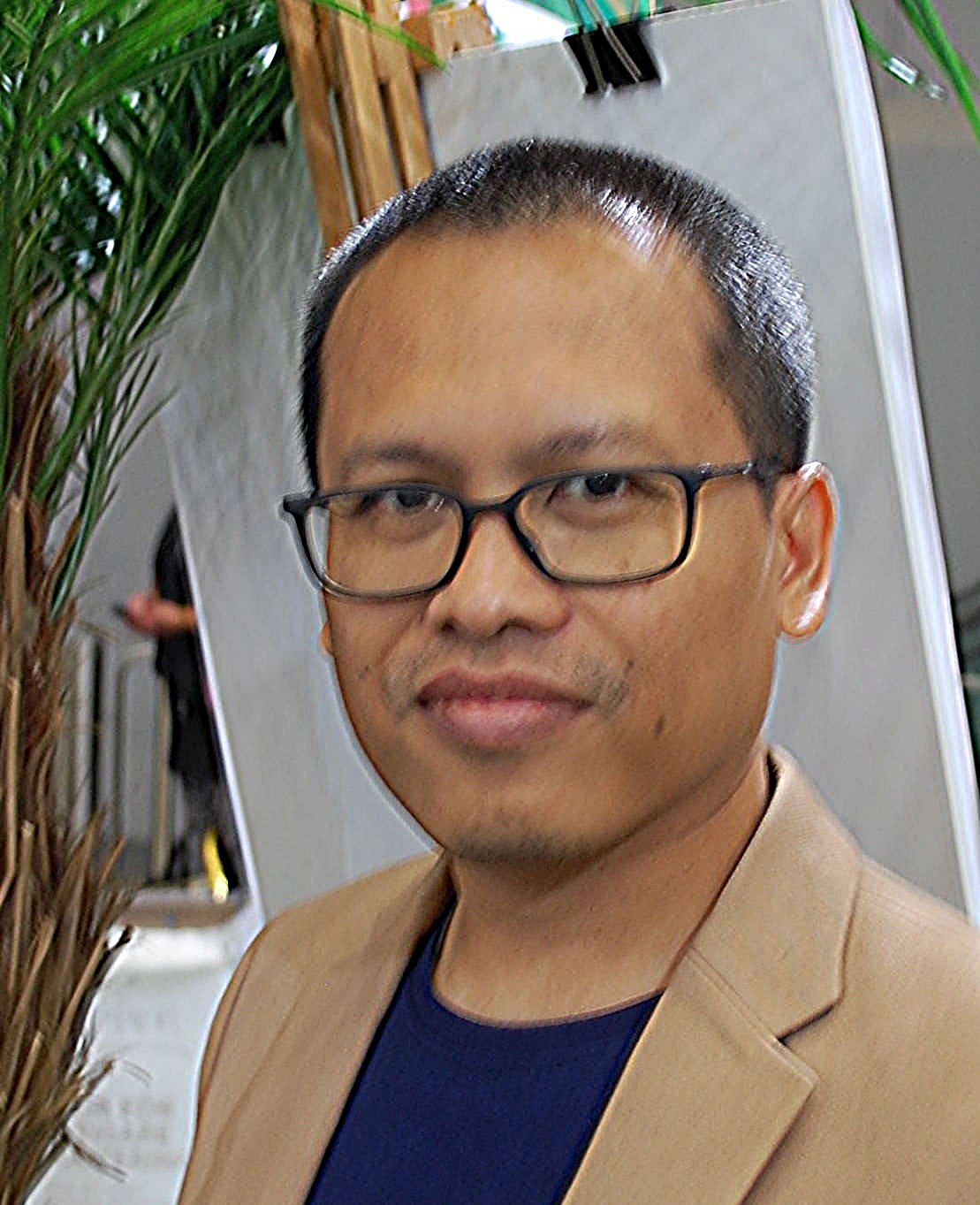
- Kurniawan in 2017
- Born: November 28, 1975 (age 50); Tasikmalaya, West Java
- Education: Universitas Gadjah Mada
- Occupations: Author; screenwriter
- Spouse: Ratih Kumala (m. 2006)
- Writing career
- Period: 1999–present
- Genre: Literary fiction
- Notable work: Beauty Is A Wound
- Website: iniekakurniawan.wixsite.com

Eka Kurniawan (born November 28, 1975) is an Indonesian writer and screenwriter.

In 2016, Kurniawan became the first Indonesian writer to be nominated for the Man Booker International Prize.

== Early life ==
Kurniawan was born in Tasikmalaya, West Java, and grew up in a small coastal town, Pangandaran. He studied philosophy at Gadjah Mada University, Yogyakarta. Kurniawan currently lives in Jakarta. He writes novels, short stories, movie scripts, and blog, as well as essays. His works are translated into more than 24 languages.

== Career ==
His novel Beauty Is a Wound was included in the list of 100 notable books by The New York Times. The use of magic realism in the book has led to comparisons to Gabriel García Márquez. Kurniawan has insisted that Beauty Is a Wound is neither a historical novel nor a book about Indonesian history. Kurniawan's style of "approaching social concerns at an angle rather than head-on, with hefty doses of surrealism and wry humour" also draws comparisons to Haruki Murakami. He has been described as "Indonesia's finest writer since Pramoedya Ananta Toer" and "Indonesia's most exciting author."

In 2016, Palari Films announced a film adaptation of Kurniawan's book Vengeance Is Mine, All Others Pay Cash to be directed by Edwin, who would also co-write the screenplay with Kurniawan. The film was expected to get a 2021 release.

== Personal life ==
Kurniawan is married to fellow writer and screenwriter Ratih Kumala.

== Bibliography ==
Year	Book	Publisher	Notes
1999	Pramoedya Ananta Toer dan Sastra Realisme Sosialis	Aksara Indonesia; Gramedia Pustaka Utama	Non-fiction
2000	Corat-Coret di Toilet	Aksara Indonesia	Short stories
2002	Cantik Itu Luka	Jendela; Gramedia Pustaka Utama	
2004	Lelaki Harimau	Gramedia Pustaka Utama	
2005	Gelak Sedih dan Cerita-Cerita Lainnya	Gramedia Pustaka Utama	Short stories
2005	Cinta Tak Ada Mati dan Cerita-Cerita Lainnya	Gramedia Pustaka Utama	Short stories
2010	Kumpulan Budak Setan	Gramedia Pustaka Utama	Co-author
2014	Seperti Dendam, Rindu Harus Dibayar Tuntas	Gramedia Pustaka Utama	
2015	Perempuan Patah Hati yang Kembali Menemukan Cinta Melalui Mimpi	Gramedia Pustaka Utama	Short stories
2016	O	Gramedia Pustaka Utama	
2019	Senyap yang Lebih Nyaring	Circa	
2020	Usaha Menulis Silsilah Bacaan	Circa	
2021	Sumur: Sebuah Cerita	Gramedia Pustaka Utama	Short story
2024	The Dog Meows, the Cat Barks		Novella/Novel
2024	Mat Pisau	Gramedia Pustaka Utama	Short story accompanying the twentieth-anniversary edition of Lelaki Harimau.

=== English ===
Year	Book	Publisher	Notes
2015	Beauty Is a Wound	New Directions	Cantik Itu Luka, translated by Annie Tucker
2015	Man Tiger	Verso Books	Lelaki Harimau, translated by Labodalih Sembiring
2017	Vengeance Is Mine, All Others Pay Cash	New Directions	Seperti Dendam, Rindu Harus Dibayar Tuntas, translated by Annie Tucker
2019	Kitchen Curse	Verso Books	Short stories translated by Benedict Anderson, Maggie Tiojakin, Tiffany Tsao, and Annie Tucker
2020	Tales of Two Planets (Chapter: The Well)	Penguin Books	Anthology, edited by John Freeman
2026	The Dog Meows, the Cat Barks	New Directions; Pushkin Press	Translated from Indonesian by Annie Tucker.

== Filmography ==
Year	Film	Credit	Directed by
2021	Vengeance Is Mine, All Others Pay Cash	Screenwriter (with Edwin)	Edwin
2026	Sleep No More	Screenwriter (with Edwin and Daishi Matsunaga)	Edwin

== Accolades ==
Year	Award	Work	Result	Ref.
2005	Kusala Khatulistiwa Literary Award for Fiction	Cinta Tak Ada Mati dan Cerita-Cerita Lainnya	Longlisted	
2014	Kusala Khatulistiwa Literary Award for Fiction	Seperti Dendam, Rindu Harus Dibayar Tuntas	Shortlisted	
2015	Foreign Policy's Global Thinkers of 2015	Himself	Won	
2015	IKAPI Award for Book of the Year	Lelaki Harimau	Won	
2015	Kusala Khatulistiwa Literary Award for Fiction	Perempuan Patah Hati yang Kembali Menemukan Cinta Melalui Mimpi	Shortlisted	
2015	Indonesian Readers Award for Best Fiction Writer	Perempuan Patah Hati yang Kembali Menemukan Cinta Melalui Mimpi	Shortlisted	
2016	World Readers Award	Beauty Is a Wound	Won	
2016	Best Translated Book Award	Beauty Is a Wound	Longlisted	
2016	International Booker Prize	Man Tiger	Longlisted	
2016	Financial Times/OppenheimerFunds Emerging Voices Fiction Award	Man Tiger	Won	
2016	Indonesian Readers Award for Best Fiction Cover	Lelaki Harimau	Shortlisted	
2018	Prince Claus Award	Himself	Won	
2022	10th Maya Award for Best Adapted Screenplay (shared with Edwin)	Vengeance Is Mine, All Others Pay Cash	Nominated	
2022	42nd Citra Award for Best Adapted Screenplay (shared with Edwin)	Vengeance Is Mine, All Others Pay Cash	Won	
