= UNICEF Indonesia =

- Abbreviation: UNICEF Indonesia
- Formation: 1948
- Type: Country office
- Legal status: Active
- Headquarters: Jakarta, Indonesia
- Head: Maniza Zaman (Representative)
- Parent organization: UNICEF International
- Website: http://www.unicef.org/indonesia

UNICEF Indonesia is one of over 190 national offices within the United Nations Children’s Fund. As one of the first UNICEF offices established in Asia, UNICEF Indonesia has been on the ground since 1948 to uphold the rights of children in the vast archipelago, including their right to education, healthcare, and protection from abuse and exploitation. It also advocates for political change in support of children, and works with partner organizations from the public, charity, and private sectors to effect change.

UNICEF was founded in 1946 to provide food, clothing, and health care to children in Europe after the Second World War. In 1953, the UN General Assembly extended UNICEF’s mandate indefinitely. And in 1989, it adopted the UN Convention on the Rights of the Child (CRC), which has since become the most widely adopted human rights treaty in history. The CRC now underpins UNICEF’s work worldwide, including in Indonesia, and defines children’s rights to protection, education, health care and nutrition, water sanitation, and hygiene.

== Missions ==
UNICEF Indonesia objectives for 2010 - 2015 are working with the government, academic research centers, and other partners to help shape child-friendly policies and more effective public social spending that will reach millions of children and reduce disparities. UNICEF Indonesia also helps to build capacity for government institutions to offer basic healthcare, education, and child protection services, thereby increasing access for individuals and families.

UNICEF Indonesia's main areas of work will cover:

Policy Advocacy and Partnerships for Children focuses on social policy, budgeting, social protection, evidence-based advocacy, knowledge management, communications for development, media relations, and private sector fundraising and partnerships.

Child Survival and Development provides strategic support and technical assistance to improve policies and access to and uptake of services through the health system, particularly the posyandu (integrated health post) network. It aims to improve water and sanitation for poor and vulnerable children and women; develop capacity in health human resources, especially in remote poor areas; improve health information systems, monitoring, and evaluation; document lessons learned to enrich governance, services, and resource allocation.

Education and Adolescent Development aims to ensure children and young people, especially vulnerable populations, are equipped with adequate knowledge, basic education, and life skills to cope with challenges and opportunities such as fighting HIV and AIDS. It also aims to have refined government and community-based organization capacities at national and sub-national levels for implementing holistic early childhood development; strengthened legislation and increased budget allocations for achieving school readiness for children below seven years of age, improved education sector preparedness plans, strengthened capacities of government, and civil society organizations to respond to disasters and emergencies.

Child Protection emphasizes building comprehensive child protection systems at national and sub-national levels. Priorities include but are not limited to, strengthened service delivery systems at the national and sub-national levels, promoting family-based care, developing a child-sensitive justice system, promoting restorative justice for child offenders, and continuing to assist the government in rolling out universal birth registration.

UNICEF Indonesia's list of Goodwill Ambassadors so far includes Ferry Salim and Nicholas Saputra.

Where does UNICEF add its value?

1. By being a center of knowledge and expertise to empower government to be effective in supporting services for children and women.

- UNICEF provides technical assistance to government, parliament, the private sector and other Indonesian leaders to improve policies and approaches that improve the lives of women and children – all based on a solid and credible base of evidence and in line with international standards.
- UNICEF works with academic institutions and development organizations to collect and analyze data and examples of good practice to strengthen Indonesian responses to child rights, and supports the development and testing of “models” that tackle inequalities and that can be taken to scale under the leadership of government.
- UNICEF advocates for the needs and rights of children and women to be integrated into policy design and service implementation by increasing knowledge and understanding of the importance of child rights in development programs.
- UNICEF helps to monitor and report on progress and remaining challenges, so that services and strategies can be revised and improved, helping ensure that the delivery of services for women and children is even more effective.

2. By targeting resources to reach the most vulnerable

- UNICEF helps increase access to services, and the quality of those services with a special focus on the most poor and vulnerable families. This is done by investing in the skills and potential of service providers such as teachers and health workers, as well as local institutions, organizations and communities working with children.
- UNICEF identifies and supports improvements in systems – both and formal and non-formal – that help ensure services are delivery effectively, and that they reach those most in need. This includes expansion of birth registration systems, improvements to the juvenile justice system, enhancing the scope and quality of early childhood development initiatives and helping assess the impact and effectiveness of public spending decisions.
- UNICEF supports public education activities, to increase uptake of services and strengthen understanding of specific issues that pose a threat to children’s and women’s health and development – such as avian influenza, child marriage and other abuses, HIV and AIDS, and poor hygiene practices.

3. By empowering children and young people themselves

- UNICEF supports initiatives that give children and young people the opportunity to speak out for themselves on issues that concern them; for example by supporting national awards for young leaders and writers.
- UNICEF supports peer education – enabling young people to become advocates themselves in their own communities to promote child rights.
- UNICEF helps bring children and young people together with decision-makers – either directly through children’s forums and other networks, or indirectly through support for media initiatives that provide a platform for children’s opinions to be heard on the public stage.

4. By being at the forefront of emergency response

- UNICEF is among the first UN agencies to respond to natural disasters and other emergencies, rushing supplies and personnel to the crisis zone to ensure the life-saving needs of children are prioritized. UNICEF also plays a leading role in coordination of emergency relief efforts, helping ensure that vital resources are used effectively and with maximum impact.
- UNICEF also maintain a presence in affected areas after the crisis has subsided, to ensure that resources continue to be employed to rebuild services and systems for women and children, and to assist with the psychological needs of children as they emerge from a disaster.
- UNICEF uses its global experience and lessons learned from Indonesia to help national and local government and community bodies to be best prepared for emergencies, helping reducing response times and ensuring that the necessary skills and resources are effectively deployed in the event of future emergencies.

== List of UNICEF Indonesia Goodwill ambassadors ==
- Ferry Salim (2004)
- Nicholas Saputra (2019)

== See also ==
- UN Convention on the Rights of the Child
- UNICEF
- Unite for Children, Unite Against AIDS
