= The Dog Meows, the Cat Barks =

Novella by Eka Kurniawan

The Dog Meows, the Cat Barks (Indonesian: Anjing Mengeong, Kucing Menggonggong) is a 2024 Indonesian fiction book by Eka Kurniawan. Kirkus Reviews described it as "novella more than novel".

The novel describes the religious journey of Sato Reang, a boy who is growing up.

The English translation, published in 2026 by New Directions Publishing in the United States, was translated by Annie Tucker. The British publisher is Pushkin Press.

At times the novel uses the third person and at other times it uses the first person.

== Reception ==
Publishers Weekly gave the book a starred review and stated "humor and heart" characterize the story, which the review called "sweet".

Kirkus described the work as "A memorable look into a delinquent mind" and "A pensive portrait of rural anomie."
