= Anwar: The Untold Story =

- Theatrical release poster
- Directed by: Viva Westi
- Screenplay by: Zulkiflee Anwar Haque; Viva Vesti
- Produced by: Mohamed Nolizam; Zulkiflee Anwar Haque (executive)
- Starring: Farid Kamil; Hasnul Rahmat; Acha Septriasa; Piet Pagau; Dewi Irawan; Gisellma Firmansyah
- Cinematography: Rahmat Syaiful
- Music by: Andi Rianto
- Production companies: Bianglala Entertainment; Yusrych Global; DMY Creation
- Distributed by: GSC Movies
- Release date: May 18, 2023 (Malaysia)
- Countries: Malaysia; Indonesia
- Language: Malay
- Budget: RM10 million
- Box office: RM3.5 million

Anwar: The Untold Story is a 2023 biographical political drama film directed by Viva Westi. The film revolves on Prime Minister of Malaysia, Anwar Ibrahim's exploitation as the Finance Minister and Deputy Prime Minister from 1993 to 1998 and his struggle to fight corruption. It stars Farid Kamil as Anwar.

== Plot ==
The film recounts Anwar Ibrahim's tenure as Deputy Prime Minister and Finance Minister from 1993 to 1998, his subsequent experiences of being falsely accused, dismissed, detained, and appearing in court. It concludes with his court appearance on September 29, 1998.

== Cast ==
- Farid Kamil as Anwar Ibrahim
- Hasnul Rahmat as Mahathir Mohamad
- Acha Septriasa as Wan Azizah Wan Ismail
- Gisellma Firmansyah as Nurul Nuha Anwar
- Saskia Chadwick as Nurul Izzah Anwar
- Dewi Irawan as Che Wan
- Piet Pagau as Ibrahim Abdul Rahman
- Felice Lovely Hidayat as Nurul Iman Anwar
- Azzahra Annasera as Nurul Hana Anwar
- Hatta Rahandy ss Marzuki Ibrahim
- Arswendy Bening as Hassan Marican
- Firdaus Karim as Rusli Ibrahim
- Eduwart Manalu as Mokhtar Ibrahim
- David Chalik as Rani Ibrahim
- Yandi Nurdiansa as Idrus Ibrahim
- Stephanus Tjiproet as Fadzil Noor
- Raafat Ahmad as Rahim Noor
- Agus Wibowo as Daim Zainuddin
- Joshua Pandelaki as Leader

== Production ==
Pre-production of the film began in 2011, while its script began written in 2021. It was co-produced by Indonesia's Bianglala Entertainment and Malaysia's Rakyat Media. Due to many restrictions in Malaysia, the main filming was completed in Indonesia, and the filming took about 2 years. According to producer Zunar's explanation when he was in Indonesia in 2022, it is usually very difficult to make historical films in Malaysia, and most of the content must be told from the government's perspective. There is also the worry that the film may face strict censorship before it is released in Malaysian theaters. This is why the film chose to be filmed in Indonesia. In addition, due to Anwar Ibrahim's status as the leader of the opposition in Parliament, it took a long time to find an actor willing to play the role of Anwar. It was not until two months before filming that Farid Kamil was found to be willing to play the role of Anwar. He was the fifth actor who met the criteria.

Zulkiflee, also known as Zunar had the idea of producing a film about Anwar since 1998. Then, after watching Rayya, Cahaya di Atas Cahaya, written and directed by Indonesian filmmaker Viva Westi in 2012, he hoped to get her to direct the film, but he had no contact information so it didn't happen until he contacted Viva in August 2021. Viva decided to contact Zunar after reading the report about Anwar Ibrahim published by the Indonesian media Times Weekly.

The film script underwent extensive research and over seven revisions. The film included interviews with Anwar's relatives and his lawyers, as well as obtaining more information about his mistreatment in prison from government sources such as the National Archives of Malaysia and the Royal Commission of Inquiry, in order to refine the film as much as possible through Anwar's own personal experience. The film's original Malay title, announced in November 2022, was Jalan Masih Panjang (The Road is Still Long). The title was later changed to Anwar: The Untold Story on the official poster released in March 2023.

=== Music ===
The film's soundtrack, "Menjaga Cintamu" (Taking Care of Your Love), was composed by Andi Rianto and lyrics by Sekar Ayu Asmara, and performed by Malaysian singer Siti Nurhaliza. The recording was completed at the Cranky Music studio owned by Malaysian musician Aubrey Suwito.

== Release and reception ==
The film was launched at the W Hotel in Kuala Lumpur on March 1, 2023. It was later released on May 11 at over 100 cinemas including Dadi Cinema, GSC, TGV Cinemas and MBO Cinemas. On May 8, the film premiered at Dadi Cinema in Pavilion Kuala Lumpur. The film was released nationwide on May 18.
