= Genervie Kam =

- Born: Kam Shi Ling; 24 May 1980 (age 45)
- Origin: Petaling Jaya, Selangor
- Occupation: Musician
- Years active: 1984–present
- Spouse: Hazama Azmi (m. 2017)

Chinese name
- Traditional Chinese: 甘詩琳
- Simplified Chinese: 甘诗琳
- Hanyu Pinyin: Gān Shīlín
- Jyutping: Gam1 Si1 Lam4
- Hokkien POJ: Kam Si-lîm
- Tâi-lô: Kam Si-lîm

Kam Shi Ling (甘诗琳; born 24 May 1980), known professionally as Genervie Kam, is a Malaysian musician.

== Early education ==
Kam began her formal piano education at the Yamaha Music School in Petaling Jaya, Selangor, Malaysia and graduated in Junior Special Advanced Course – a special course for gifted children. At the age of twelve, Kam passed the Advanced Certificate Associated Board of the Royal Schools of Music (ABRSM) with distinction. She completed her Performer's Licentiate Diploma at the Trinity College of Music, London when she was fourteen. Kam enrolled herself at the International College of Music (ICOM) and received her degree in Music in Arranging, which is validated by Westminster University, London.

== Career ==
Kam participated in the International Piano Competitions in Ústí nad Labem in the Czech Republic in 1993, performed in Budapest and Copenhagen in 1994 and 1995. In 1997, she was one of six young Malaysian pianists chosen to perform together with five international young pianists in the International Young Pianists' Concert.

Kam toured as a keyboardist, violinist and percussionist and she was the youngest member of the Jacky Cheung Music Odyssey 2002 (World Tour) which covered over 50 shows worldwide including Malaysia, Singapore, China, Taiwan, Japan, Brunei, England, US, Canada and ended in Hong Kong. In 2007 and 2008, she also performed for short tours for The Year of Jacky Cheung World Tour 2007 for all shows in Malaysia and Singapore and also for his concert in Bukit Jalil Outdoor Stadium. She also toured with Singaporean singer Stefanie Sun Yan Zi for her tour within Asia in 2004, 2005, 2006 and short tour 2010 in Beijing.

Kam has performed with the (NSO) National Symphony Orchestra. Kam has also played at award ceremonies such as Anugerah Juara Lagu (AJL), Anugerah Industri Muzik (AIM) and Anugerah Radio ERA.

Since 2001, she has been using a Fender electric violin given by her youngest brother, Arthur Kam who in 2003 was listed in the Malaysia Book of Records as "The Youngest Person To Complete A Professional Drum Course".

== Awards ==
- 2000 – Awarded scholarship by Malaysia Authors' Copyright Protection (MACP).
- 2009 – Received the Anugerah Bakat Muda (Penggubah Muzik) by the Ministry of Unity, Culture, Arts and Heritage Malaysia (Anugerah Seni Negara).
- 2011 – Awarded ICONIC WOMEN by ICON Magazine Malaysia.

== Personal life ==
Genervie Kam married singer Hazama Azmi on 15 January 2017. She was previously a Christian before embracing Islam in mid-2016.
