= Vengeance Is Mine, All Others Pay Cash =

2014 Indonesian novel by Eka Kurniawan

- First edition
- Author: Eka Kurniawan
- Original title: Seperti Dendam, Rindu Harus Dibayar Tuntas
- Translator: Annie Tucker
- Language: Indonesian
- Genres: Action; thriller; comedy
- Published: April 2014 (Gramedia Pustaka Utama, Indonesia)
- Publication place: Indonesia
- English publication date: July 2017 (Text Publishing, Australia & New Zealand); August 2017 (New Directions, United States)
- Media type: Novel
- Pages: 245 (Indonesian); 216 (English)
- ISBN: 9786020303932

Vengeance Is Mine, All Others Pay Cash is the third novel by Eka Kurniawan which was originally published in Indonesian by Gramedia Pustaka Utama in 2014 as Seperti Dendam, Rindu Harus Dibayar Tuntas.

Following international recognition that came with the strong reception of the English version of Kurniawan's earlier works—Beauty Is a Wound and Man Tiger—Vengeance Is Mine, All Others Pay Cash was announced in July 2017 with translation by Annie Tucker. As of December 2017, the novel has been translated into English, French, German, Mandarin, and Arabic.

== Synopsis ==
Ajo Kawir is one of the toughest fighters in the Javanese underworld, his fearlessness matched only by his unquenchable thirst for brawling. But the young thug is driven by a painful secret: he's been impotent ever since an incident as a teenager, when he was caught witnessing the sexual assault of the local madwoman, Scarlet Blush.

When he finally meets his match in the form of the fearsome, beautiful bodyguard Iteung, Ajo is left bruised, battered, and overjoyed. He has fallen in love. But he worries he won't be able to make Iteung happy because of his impotence.

== Main characters ==
- Ajo Kawir, a fearless thug who suffers from impotency.
- Iteung, a tough bodyguard with whom Ajo Kawir falls in love.
- Tokek (Gecko in the English version), Ajo Kawir's best friend.

== Reception ==
In a review for The Atlantic, Jane Yong Kim called the novel "a surreal, poignant account of a teen attempting to become a man." Comparing it to Kurniawan's previous work, Man Tiger, Kim wrote "In Man Tiger, Kurniawan masterfully played with time to tell a complicated family story from multiple sides. The point of that novel, as with Vengeance, is to show the insidious, trickle-down effects of men who wreak havoc with little consideration for those around them. Both works illustrate these knots of community, where propriety, rage, and survival coexist with a surprising amount of compassion—and illuminate the pain and learning of the next generation with tremendous grace."

Writing for Asian Review of Books, Tim Hannigan called Kurniawan "the Quentin Tarantino of Indonesian literature" for his "gleeful references to pulp fiction, lashings of stylized violence, and an array of characters and scenarios that far surpass the tropes and clichés which inspire them."

== Accolades ==
Year	Award	Category	Result	Ref.
2014	Kusala Khatulistiwa Literary Award	Fiction	Shortlisted	

== Film adaptation ==
A film adaptation directed by Edwin was announced in 2016 with Kurniawan co-writing the screenplay with Edwin. Marthino Lio was cast as Ajo Kawir, while singer-songwriter Sal Priadi makes his film debut as Tokek. Citra Award-nominated actress Ladya Cheryl plays Iteung.
