= Postcards from the Zoo =

2012 film

- Kebun Binatang
- Directed by: Edwin
- Written by: Edwin; Titien Wattimena; Daud Samolang
- Produced by: Meiske Taurisia
- Starring: Ladya Cheryl; Nicholas Saputra
- Cinematography: Sidi Saleh
- Edited by: Herman Panca
- Music by: Dave Lumenta
- Production companies: Babibutafilm; Pallas Film
- Release date: 15 February 2012 (Berlinale)
- Running time: 95 minutes
- Countries: Indonesia; Germany
- Language: Indonesian

Postcards from the Zoo (Indonesian: Kebun Binatang) is a 2012 Indonesian drama film written and directed by Edwin. The film was screened in competition at the 62nd Berlin International Film Festival in February 2012, making Edwin the first Indonesian filmmaker to do so in 49 years.

== Synopsis ==
Lana is a child who is abandoned by her father and left in the care of a giraffe trainer in a zoo. Lana grows up among animals, visiting and feeding them in their enclosures. For Lana, physical touch is the one experience she shares with her father and unconsciously, she always longs to be touched, which is why Lana falls in love with a magician who comes into the zoo.

== Cast ==
- Ladya Cheryl as Lana
  - Klarysa Aurelia as young Lana
- Nicholas Saputra as Magician/Cowboy

== Release ==
The film never received a wide theatrical release in Indonesia. It premiered at the 62nd Berlin International Film Festival on 15 February 2012, where it was the first Indonesian film in 49 years to compete in the main section for the Golden Bear, which eventually went to Caesar Must Die. A dubbed version received a limited release on 33 screens in Germany in January 2013 with the title of Die Nacht der Giraffe.

== Reception ==
Postcards from the Zoo received positive reviews from critics, with David Jenkins of Little White Lies giving it a 4 out of 5 stars and claiming that the film will make audience "never look at a zoo in the same way again." In a more mixed review, Adrian Pasaribu of Cinema Poetica compared the film's unusual setting to Wong Kar-wai's My Blueberry Nights (2007) but praised its cinematography and Dave Lumenta's score.

== Awards and nominations ==
Year	Award	Category	Recipient	Result	Ref.
2012	Asian Film Awards	Edward Yang New Talent Award	Edwin	Won	
2012	Tribeca Film Festival	Best Narrative Feature Jury Prize	Postcards from the Zoo	Nominated	
2012	Berlin International Film Festival	Golden Bear	Postcards from the Zoo	Nominated	
2012	Hong Kong International Film Festival	FIPRESCI Prize	Postcards from the Zoo	Nominated	
2012	Hong Kong International Film Festival	Golden Firebird Award	Edwin	Nominated	
