= Secret Ingredient (miniseries) =

2024 Philippine miniseries

- Genre: Romance; Drama
- Created by: Corinna Vistan
- Written by: Baek Dong-hoon
- Directed by: Cho Young Gwang
- Starring: Sang Heon Lee; Julia Barretto; Nicholas Saputra
- Country of origin: Philippines
- Original language: English
- No. of episodes: 6

Production
- Running time: 30 minutes
- Production companies: Viu; Unilever SEA

Original release
- Network: Viu
- Release: April 30 – June 4, 2024

Secret Ingredient is a Philippine romantic miniseries starring South Korean actor Sang Heon Lee, Filipino actress Julia Barretto, and Indonesian actor Nicholas Saputra. The show was created by Corinna Vistan, written by Baek Dong-hoon, and directed by Cho Young-gwang. It premiered on Viu on April 30, 2024, as a Viu Original series.

This is Viu's first regional original drama production featuring an ensemble Asian cast - from the Philippines, South Korea and Indonesia. It is also the first collaboration between Viu and Unilever Nutrition SEA.

== Synopsis ==
A story about a Korean man who gives up his affluent life in Seoul in search of the childhood friend he's never forgotten.

== Cast ==
- Sang Heon Lee as Ha-joon, a Korean social elite who left Seoul to find his lost love
- Julia Barretto as Maya, an aspiring chef in Jakarta who's desperate to win a cooking competition in order to pay for her mother's medical bills
- Nicholas Saputra as Arif Hadi, a headstrong executive chef who is perfectionist

== Production ==
=== Casting ===
In January 2024, the casting of South Korean actor Sang Heon Lee, Filipino actress Julia Barretto, and Indonesian actor Nicholas Saputra for a Viu original series was announced. Lee later revealed in an interview that he received a direct casting for the lead role instead of auditioning.

=== Pre-production ===
Lee worked in a Hanwoo omakase restaurant for a month as preparation and Barretto attended a short course in a culinary school to prepare for her role.

== Release ==
Viu released the first trailer in April 2024. An official media launch was held on the same month in Taguig City, Philippines.

== Episodes ==
No.	Title	Original release date
1	"Hors d'oeuvre"	April 30, 2024
Ha-joon struggles to adjust to his life in the kitchen. Maya is determined to win the cooking challenge set by Arif who is the Executive Chef for a chance to become promoted as Chef de Partie.
2	"Soup"	May 7, 2024
Maya tries to redeem herself to Arif by preparing a dish using a hard to find ingredient. Ha-joon tries to make for his mistake by helping Maya find this rare fruit called kepel.
3	"Appetizer"	May 14, 2024
Although it goes against company policy, Ha-joon and Stella encourage Maya to create a side business by selling food to hotel employees in order to pay back her debt.
4	"The Main Course"	May 21, 2024
Maya, Ha-joon and Stella join the International cooking competition in order to create more opportunities for Maya.
5	"Cheese"	May 28, 2024
Little Ha-joon and his mom must leave Korea and start their new life in an unknown country.
6	"Dessert"	June 4, 2024
Maya must find her voice and shine in order to win the culinary competition. Ha-joon flies back to Korea in order to fight for what is rightfully his.
