= Sajama Cut =

Indonesian musical group

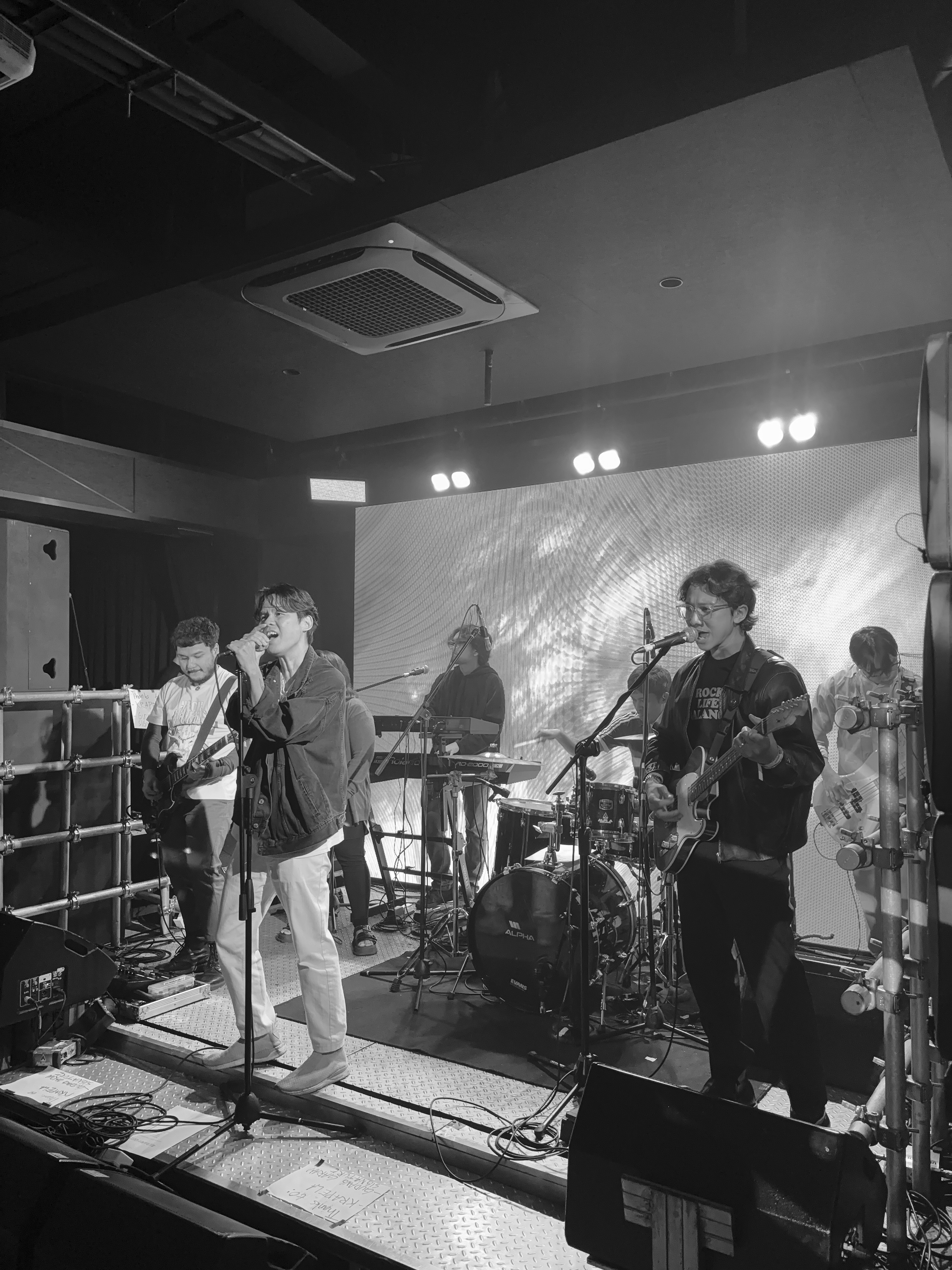
- Sajama Cut, 2024

Background information
- Origin: Jakarta, Indonesia
- Genre: indie rock
- Years active: 1999 - present
- Label: Demajors
- Members: Marcel Thee; Dewandra Danishwara; Arta Kurnia; Daniel Hasu; Adam Rinando; Aldrian Risjad
- Website: Official website

Sajama Cut is a band from Jakarta, Indonesia. The band has undergone numerous lineup changes but is always centered around lead vocalist and multi-instrumentalist Marcel Thee, a veteran journalist and writer. The band remains modestly popular within the Indonesian music scene, but is widely regarded as being both distinguishably idealistic with their uncommercial music and highly-influential to local musicians, many of whom paid tribute to the band by covering its songs on the 2022 tribute album You Can Be Anyone You Want: A Tribute to Sajama Cut. The success of that tribute album and the band's fifth record GODSIGMA (2020) widened the band's success to the mainstream market.

Since 2022, the band also includes keyboardist Daniel Hasu, guitarists Aldrian Risjad and Dewandra Danishwara, drummer Adam Rinando, and bassist Arta Kurnia.

== History ==
Sajama Cut is well known for incorporating various styles of music, which range from noise pop, ambient, indie rock, baroque pop, folk rock, lo-fi, and electronica, although the base of their songs are mostly rooted in American and European indie rock.

The band was officially established as Sajama Cut in 1999, but included similar members to its previous iteration as Roswell, which formed in 1995 and was a high school band formed by Thee, along with childhood friends Beta Wicaksono, Noviar Akbar, and Aldi Waani.

Thee is also known for his multiple side projects, including Roman Catholic Skulls, The Knife Club, The House of Faith and Mirrors, Strange Mountain, Strange Mountain II (which has released over 50 records on boutique labels internationally), Nakatomi Plaza, and Days of Being Wild.

As Roswell, the band self-released a variety of very-limited edition demos throughout the mid-90s before releasing their first album Vaginal Thoughts in 1998 on cassette format. The album was pressed independently and like many other Indonesian independent bands at the time, distributed only at rehearsal studios around the band's native hometown of Jakarta, as well as various independent record and clothing stores.

As Sajama Cut, the band released their debut album Apologia in 2002, with similar methodology as Vaginal Thoughts. The album garnered the band its first notable notice from the underground scene, although it wasn't until 2005's The Osaka Journals (released on the band's own The Bronze Medal Records label and distributed through the major label Universal Music) that mainstream audiences took notice. The singles "Fallen Japanese", "Alibi", and the bonus track "Less Afraid" were minor hits, with the latter becoming a major part of the major motion picture "Janji Joni" in 2004.

The band is known to have come up with numerous explanations for their name, among them; the name of an old Japanese children's toy, the name of Thee's father's colleague, a book/movie title, a haircut style, a random word Thee came up with, the result of the band members fooling around with a Ouija Board. This has been discredited by Marcel Thee.

In 2006, Sajama Cut also contributed 4 songs to another motion picture Photo, Box, Window.

In May 2008, L'Internationale; a remix album version of the songs from The Osaka Journals with remixes from international producers from Japan, US, UK, Indonesia, Norway, Italy, Scotland, Portugal, Germany, Venezuela and Hong Kong was released. The first single being a remix of Nemesis/Murder from the international 8-bit artist YMCK, from Tokyo, Japan. Currently there are 3 music videos made for singles from this album.

Two EPs; Night Music (1923) and Cinema Eye was released in late 2008. Another EP, New Year Ends, which dabbled in ambient, experimental music, was released during the New Year's Eve of 2010.

Sajama Cut released their new album, Manimal, in April 2010. In 2015, they released their fourth full album Hobgoblin.

Sajama Cut released their fifth full album, Godsigma (stylized as GODSIGMA), on 16 October 2020. It became the band's most popular release, gaining them new and younger audiences. Publications such as VICE, Jeurnals, The Jakarta Post, PopHariIni, and Koloni Gigs placed the album on their best of 2022 lists.

The band released the single "Homili/Menatap Wajah Tuhan" on April 25, 2025. It was the band's first new song in five years and is stated to be the first song from their upcoming sixth album, slated to be released later this year. It was followed by "Di Masa Depan Kita Tak Lagi Bermimpi" the following month. The band's sixth full-length album "Cowabunga", was released digitally on July 11, 2025.

The Osaka Journals was listed in the "Top 5 Albums of 2000s" in The Jakarta Post newspaper.

== Discography ==
The band has released six albums, along with numerous compilations, most notably the best selling JKT:SKRG (Jakarta Now!) compilation, and had a major radio hit when their single "Less Afraid" appeared on the motion picture Joni's Promise, in which the song could be heard almost in its entirety two times during the movie.

=== Albums ===
Year	Title
2002:	Apologia
2005:	The Osaka Journals
2010:	Manimal
2015:	Hobgoblin
2020:	Godsigma
2025:	Cowabunga

=== Singles/Remixes/EPs ===
Year	Title
2007:	The Nemesis EP
2008:	L'Internationale
2008:	Night Music (1923)
2008:	Cinema Eye
2009:	New Year Ends
2010:	Paintings/Pantings
2010:	Celebrations (Light It Up)
2011:	Panther East Ghouls, 1867
2011:	Twice (Rung the Ladder) / Poral Molice
2011:	Chinese Magicians

=== Compilations ===
Year	Title
2003:	Mesin Distorsi
2003:	Total Feedback
2004:	Jakarta Now Vol.1
2004:	Joni's Promise (soundtrack)
2006:	Photo, Box, Window
2006:	Alila Hotel Compilation

== See also ==
- List of Indonesian rock bands
