= 3 Days to Forever =

2007 Indonesian comedy-drama film

- Film poster
- Indonesian: 3 Hari Untuk Selamanya
- Directed by: Riri Riza
- Written by: Sinar Ayu Massie
- Produced by: Mira Lesmana
- Starring: Nicholas Saputra; Adinia Wirasti
- Cinematography: Yadi Sugandi
- Edited by: Sastha Sunu
- Music by: Float
- Production company: Miles Films
- Distributed by: SinemArt
- Release date: December 2007 (Jakarta)
- Country: Indonesia
- Language: Indonesian

3 Days to Forever (Indonesian: 3 Hari Untuk Selamanya) is a 2007 Indonesian adult comedy-drama film directed by Riri Riza. The story is about a young man and a woman who drive from Jakarta to Yogyakarta.

The film had a successful run at several international film festivals, winning best direction (Riri Riza) at the Brussels International Independent Film Festival 2008 and best Indonesian film at the Jakarta International Film Festival 2007.

== Plot ==
Ambar is asked by her family to accompany her cousin Yusuf in delivering important wedding items from Jakarta to Yogyakarta. Initially planning to travel by plane, the two miss their flight after a night of drinking. As a result, they decide to make the journey by car instead. During the three-day trip, Ambar and Yusuf travel across Java, encountering a variety of people and situations that delay their arrival. Along the way, they engage in conversations about personal identity, relationships, religion, and their views on adulthood. Their differing personalities, Yusuf’s more conservative outlook and Ambar’s independent attitude, lead to both conflict and reflection. As the journey progresses, the emotional and psychological distance between them shifts, and an underlying tension develops. Their shared experiences on the road ultimately shape their understanding of themselves and each other by the time they reach their destination.

== Cast ==
- Nicholas Saputra as Yusuf
- Adinia Wirasti as Ambar
- Leroy Osmani as Gerson
- Adi Kurdi as Bambang
- Nidya Ayu Riandri Febrina as Adin
- Ringgo Agus Rahman as Edwina
- Tutie Kirana as Bude Malin
- T.M Tarzan as H. Satimo
