= Sang Heon Lee =

South Korean actor

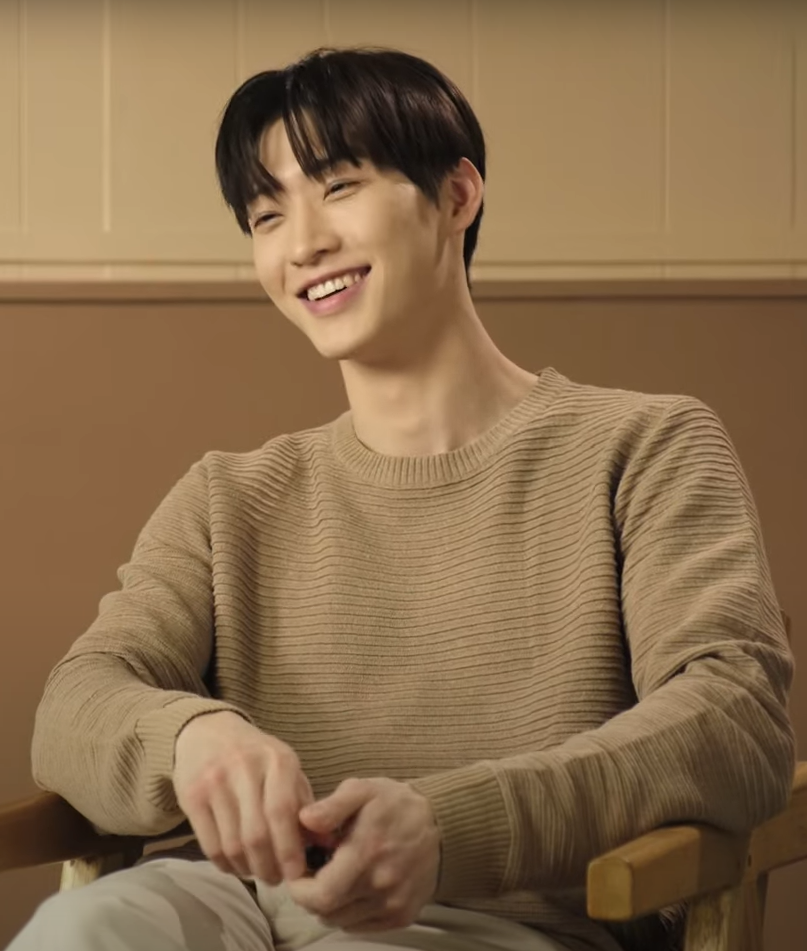
- Lee in 2024
- Born: Seoul, South Korea
- Education: University of Northampton
- Occupation: Actor
- Years active: 2023–present
- Relatives: Gia Kim (sister)

Korean name
- Hangul: 이상헌
- RR: I Sangheon
- MR: I Sanghŏn
- IPA: [isaŋɦʌn]

Sang Heon Lee (Korean: 이상헌) is a South Korean actor. He is known for starring in the American television series XO, Kitty (2023–present) by Netflix and the Philippine miniseries Secret Ingredient (2024) by Viu.

== Early life and education ==
Sang Heon Lee was born in Seoul, South Korea. He has an older sister, actress and XO, Kitty co-star, Gia Kim. He spent most of his childhood and teenage years in Hong Kong due to his father's work in the construction industry.

Lee and his sister attended Island School while living in Hong Kong. He began having an interest in acting from taking drama classes during his school years, which subsequently led him to major in Drama at the University of Northampton in England. After graduating from university, he returned to South Korea to fulfill his mandatory military duty for two years.

== Career ==
Lee previously worked as a model in addition to appearing as a background actor and reenactment actor in documentaries. His sister, Gia, suggested to Lee to submit an audition tape for XO, Kitty, which became his first official audition for a major acting role. Lee subsequently made his film debut with a small role in the biographical film, Gran Turismo (2023), based on Jann Mardenborough's life and career as a professional race car driver which was released on August 11, 2023. In 2024, he starred in the Filipino romantic series Secret Ingredient by Viu.

== Personal life ==
Lee is an avid rock climber. A self-proclaimed foodie, he taught himself how to cook by watching YouTube videos of Gordon Ramsay during his undergraduate years in England.

== Filmography ==
=== Film ===
Year	Title	Role	Notes	Ref.
2023	Gran Turismo	Joo-Hwan Lee	First film debut	

=== Television ===
Year	Title	Role	Notes	Ref.
2023	XO, Kitty	Min-ho Moon	Main role	
2024	Secret Ingredient	Ha-joon	Miniseries; 6 episodes	
