= Edwin (director) =

Indonesian filmmaker

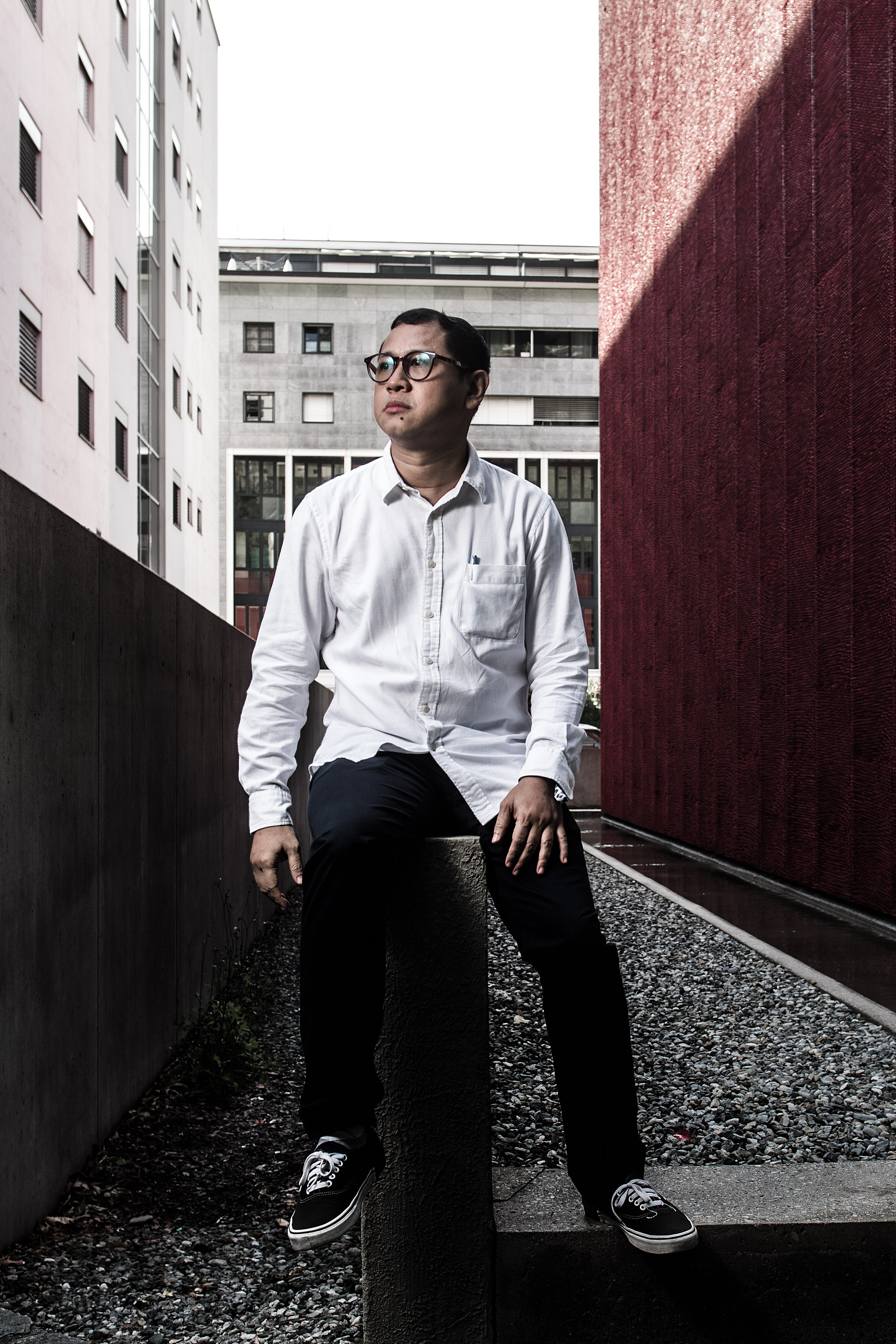
- Edwin in 2021
- Born: Edwin; 24 April 1978 (age 48); Surabaya, East Java
- Citizenship: Indonesia
- Education: Jakarta Institute of Arts
- Occupations: Director; producer; writer
- Years active: 2002–present
- Awards: See full list

Edwin (born 24 April 1978) is an Indonesian film director, producer, and screenwriter. He has won a total of four Citra Awards: Best Short Film for Kara, Anak Sebatang Pohon (2005), Best Director for Posesif (2017), as well as Best Director and Best Adapted Screenplay (shared with Eka Kurniawan) for Vengeance is Mine, All Others Pay Cash (2022). His feature film debut Blind Pig Who Wants to Fly (2008) earned critical acclaim and won several international festival awards. In 2012, Edwin received the Edward Yang New Talent Award at the 6th Asian Film Awards.

In 2012, Edwin's sophomore feature Postcards from the Zoo was selected to compete in the main section of the 62nd Berlin International Film Festival, making him the first Indonesian filmmaker to compete for the prestigious Golden Bear in 49 years. In 2021, Edwin won Golden Leopard at the 74th Locarno Film Festival with Vengeance Is Mine, All Others Pay Cash.

== Career ==
Edwin first came to prominence in Indonesia as the filmmaker behind Kara, Anak Sebatang Pohon (2005), a short film telling the story of a little girl living in an isolated place. The film was received positively and earned Edwin a Citra Award for Best Short Film at that year's Indonesian Film Festival. Internationally, Edwin made a name for himself with the 2005 silent short film Dajang Soembi, the Woman Who Was Married to a Dog. Throughout 2015, the film competed at the International Short Film Festival Hamburg, the Vancouver International Film Festival, and the Taipei Golden Horse Film Festival.

Edwin's breakthrough came with his award-winning feature film directorial debut Blind Pig Who Wants to Fly in 2008. He followed this up with Postcards from the Zoo in 2012, Someone's Wife in the Boat of Someone's Husband in 2013, Posesif in 2017, and Aruna & Her Palate in 2018. For the latter two, Edwin received two consecutive Citra Award nominations for Best Director, winning for Posesif.

Edwin's latest project is an adaptation of Eka Kurniawan's best-selling book Vengeance Is Mine, All Others Pay Cash which stars Ladya Cheryl, with whom Edwin has collaborated frequently, including his first two feature releases and several of his short films. It was released in August 2021 at the 74th Locarno Film Festival, where it won Golden Leopard, making Edwin the first Indonesian filmmaker to do so.

== Filmography ==
Year	Film	Director	Writer	Producer	Editing	Notes	Ref.
2008	9808	Yes	No	No	No	Anthology film	
2008	Blind Pig Who Wants to Fly	Yes	Yes	Yes	No		
2011	Belkibolang	Yes	No	No	No	Segment: 'Rollercoaster'	
2012	Postcards from the Zoo	Yes	Yes	No	No		
2013	Someone's Wife in the Boat of Someone's Husband	Yes	Yes	No	No		
2016	Cut	No	No	Yes	No	Documentary film; directed by Chairun Nissa	
2017	Posesif	Yes	No	No	No		
2018	Aruna & Her Palate	Yes	No	No	No		
2018	Asian Three-Fold Mirror 2018: Journey	Yes	No	No	Yes	Segment: 'Variable No.3'	
2021	Vengeance Is Mine, All Others Pay Cash	Yes	Yes	No	No		
2024	Borderless Fog	Yes	Yes	No	No		
2025	Sleep No More	Yes	Yes	No	No		

=== Short films ===
Year	Film	Director	Writer	Producer	Notes	Ref.
2003	A Very Slow Breakfast	Yes	Yes	Yes		
2004	Dajang Soembi, the Woman Who Was Married to a Dog	Yes	No	No		
2005	Kara, Anak Sebatang Pohon	Yes	Yes	No		
2006	A Very Boring Conversation	Yes	Yes	Yes		
2008	Trip to the Wound	Yes	Yes	No		
2008	Hulahoop Soundings	Yes	Yes	No		
2015	The Fox Exploits the Tiger's Might	No	No	Yes	Directed by Lucky Kuswandi	
2015	Following Diana	No	No	Yes	Directed by Kamila Andini	
2015	Love Story Not	No	No	Yes	Directed by Yosep Anggi Noen	

== Awards and nominations ==
Year	Award	Category	Work	Result
2005	25th Citra Awards	Best Short Film	Kara, Anak Sebatang Pohon	Won
2007	Jogja-NETPAC Asian Film Festival	Blencong Award	A Very Boring Conversation	Won
2008	Cinemanila International Film Festival	Best Southeast Asian Film	Blind Pig Who Wants to Fly	Nominated
2008	Busan International Film Festival	New Currents Award	Blind Pig Who Wants to Fly	Nominated
2009	Buenos Aires International Festival of Independent Cinema	Best Film	Blind Pig Who Wants to Fly	Nominated
2009	Jogja-NETPAC Asian Film Festival	Golden Hanoman	Blind Pig Who Wants to Fly	Nominated
2009	Golden Horse Film Festival and Awards	NETPAC Award	Blind Pig Who Wants to Fly	Won
2009	Nantes Three Continents Festival	Golden Montgolfiere	Blind Pig Who Wants to Fly	Nominated
2009	Nantes Three Continents Festival	Silver Montgolfiere	Blind Pig Who Wants to Fly	Won
2009	Nantes Three Continents Festival	Young Audience Award	Blind Pig Who Wants to Fly	Won
2009	International Film Festival Rotterdam	Tiger Award	Blind Pig Who Wants to Fly	Nominated
2009	International Film Festival Rotterdam	FIPRESCI Prize	Blind Pig Who Wants to Fly	Won
2009	Singapore International Film Festival	NETPAC Award Special Mention	Blind Pig Who Wants to Fly	Won
2010	Jogja-NETPAC Asian Film Festival	Golden Hanoman	Belkibolang	Nominated
2012	Asian Film Awards	Edward Yang New Talent Award	Himself	Won
2012	World Cinema Amsterdam Festival	Special Mention of the Jury	Postcards from the Zoo	Nominated
2012	Tribeca Film Festival	Best Narrative Feature Jury Prize	Postcards from the Zoo	Nominated
2012	Art Film Festival	Blue Angel	Postcards from the Zoo	Nominated
2012	Cinefan Festival of Asian and Arab Cinema	Special Jury Prize	Postcards from the Zoo	Won
2012	Berlin International Film Festival	Golden Bear	Postcards from the Zoo	Nominated
2012	Hong Kong International Film Festival	FIPRESCI Prize	Postcards from the Zoo	Nominated
2012	Hong Kong International Film Festival	Golden Firebird	Postcards from the Zoo	Nominated
2012	Jogja-NETPAC Asian Film Festival	Golden Hanoman	Postcards from the Zoo	Nominated
2012	Jogja-NETPAC Asian Film Festival	Silver Hanoman	Postcards from the Zoo	Won
2013	Black Movie Film Festival	Critics Prize	Postcards from the Zoo	Nominated
2017	1st Tempo Film Festival	Best Director	Posesif	Nominated
2017	37th Citra Awards	Best Director	Posesif	Won
2018	38th Citra Awards	Best Director	Aruna & Her Palate	Nominated
2018	7th Maya Awards	Best Director	Aruna & Her Palate	Nominated
2018	2nd Tempo Film Festival	Best Director	Aruna & Her Palate	Nominated
2019	Osaka Asian Film Festival	ABC Award	Aruna & Her Palate	Won
2021	74th Locarno Film Festival	Golden Leopard	Vengeance Is Mine, All Others Pay Cash	Won
2021	Valladolid International Film Festival	Golden Spike	Vengeance Is Mine, All Others Pay Cash	Nominated
2021	25th Online Film Critics Society Awards	Best Non-US Release	Vengeance Is Mine, All Others Pay Cash	Won
2022	International Film Festival of Kerala	World Cinema	Vengeance Is Mine, All Others Pay Cash	Nominated
2022	10th Maya Awards	Best Director	Vengeance Is Mine, All Others Pay Cash	Nominated
2022	10th Maya Awards	Best Adapted Screenplay (shared with Eka Kurniawan	Vengeance Is Mine, All Others Pay Cash	Nominated
2022	42nd Citra Awards	Best Director	Vengeance Is Mine, All Others Pay Cash	Won
2022	42nd Citra Awards	Best Adapted Screenplay (shared with Eka Kurniawan	Vengeance Is Mine, All Others Pay Cash	Won

=== Honours ===
- Jury Member at the 2023 Busan International Film Festival for its main competition section 'New Currents Award'.
