= Seno Gumira Ajidarma =

Indonesian author (born 1958)

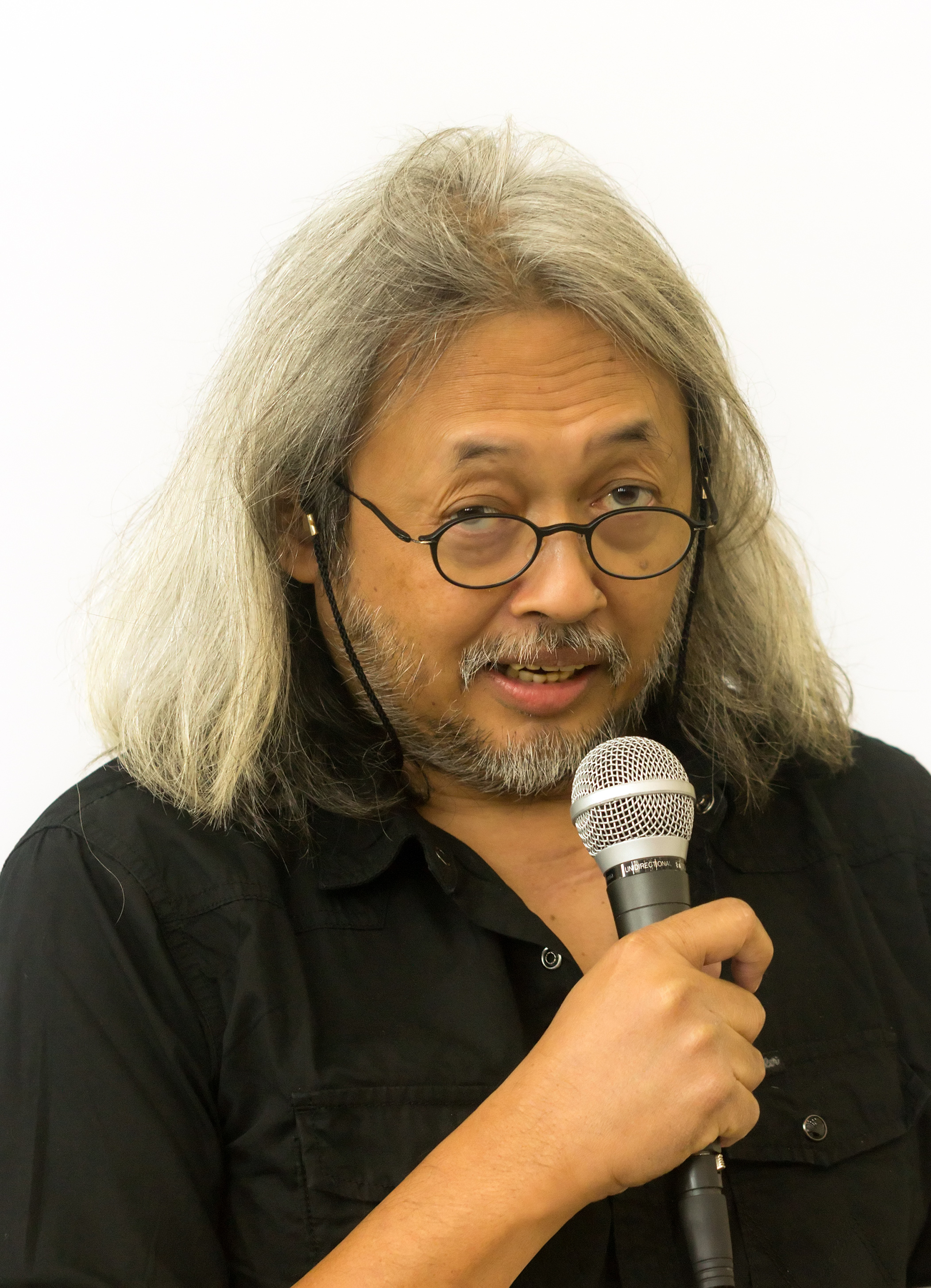
Seno Gumira Ajidarma in 2017

Seno Gumira Ajidarma (born June 19, 1958) is an Indonesian author of short stories, novels, essays, and movie scripts. He is also known as a journalist, photographer and lecturer. He won the 1997 S.E.A. Write Award (Southeast Asian Writers Award). Some of his well-known short stories are Manusia Kamar (1988), Penembak Misterius (1993), Saksi Mata (1994), Dilarang Menyanyi di Kamar Mandi (1995), Sebuah Pertanyaan untuk Cinta (1996) and Iblis Tidak Pernah Mati (1999).

Seno has been writing fiction since the age of 16 and began working as a journalist when he was 19. He has published more than 30 books since the 1980s when he emerged as a prominent short story writer in the genre known as sastra koran (newspaper literature).

Seno's short stories often both document everyday life and criticize contemporary social, cultural and political conditions. He has been a consistent advocate of free speech and freedom of publication, writing about sensitive issues, including military violence in East Timor in the stories of Eyewitness and in his 1996 novel, Jazz, Parfum dan Insiden (Jazz, Perfume and an Incident). Other subject matter has included the so-called “mysterious killings” in East Java in the early 1980s, and instability in Aceh.

A number of his short stories have been made into house by composer Ananda Sukarlan, among others "Ibu yang Anaknya Diculik Itu" (The Mother whose son has been kidnapped) or "Clara".

Seno's credo is "When journalism is silenced, literature must speak. Because while journalism speaks with facts, literature speaks with truth."

His writing styles are varied, from reportage and realism to fantasy. When asked in 2001 whether he is a journalist, a short story writer, a poet or a political commentator, and about whether his work is surrealism, magic realism, fantasy or postmodern journalism, he said simply, ‘Call it whatever you want. It’s what I do.’ In 2014, he launched a blog called PanaJournal that features human interest stories along with various journalists and communication professionals.

== Awards ==
- South East Asia(SEA)Write Award /1997
- Dinny O’Hearn Prize for Literary Translation([1997] / Eyewitness (short stories)
- Penghargaan Pusat Pembinaan dan Pengembangan Bahasa 1997/Dilarang Menyanyi di Kamar Mandi (short stories)
- Hadiah Sastra 1997 / Negeri Kabut (short stories)
- Khatulistiwa Literary Award (2004 / Negeri Senja (novel) & 2005/ Kitab Omong Kosong (novel)
- Anugerah Pena Kencana 2008/ Cinta di Atas Perahu Cadik (short story)
- Kompas Daily Best Short Story Award (1993/Pelajaran Mengarang, 2007/Cinta di Atas Perahu Cadik, 2010/Dodolitdodolitdodolibret)

== Major works ==
Short Stories Compilations

- Dunia Sukab
- Penembak Misterius
- Negeri Kabut (Country of Mist)
- Matinya Seorang Penari Telanjang
- Iblis Tidak Pernah Mati
- Atas Nama Malam
- Aku Kesepian Sayang, Datanglah menjelang Kematian
- Kematian Donny Osmond
- Dilarang Menyanyi di Kamar Mandi (Don't Sing in the Bathroom)
- Sebuah Pertanyaan Untuk Cinta
- Linguae

Novels

- Jazz, Parfum dan Insiden
- Negeri Senja
- Biola Tak Berdawai
- Kitab Omong Kosong
- Kalatidha
- Wisanggeni Sang Buronan
- Nagabumi I & II & III
- Saksi Mata

Non-Fiction

- Ketika Jurnalisme Dibungkam Sastra Harus Bicara
- Layar Kata
- Kisah Mata
- Surat Dari Palmerah
- Sembilan Wali dan Syekh Siti Jenar
- Panji Tengkorak: Kebudayaan dalam Perbincangan
