= Sekar Ayu Asmara =

Indonesian songwriter, director, and author

Sekar Ayu Asmara is an Indonesian songwriter, director, and author.

== Biography ==
Asmara was born in Jakarta to a diplomat and his wife. She accompanied her father to foreign countries when he received an assignment. While overseas with her family, she attended several colleges.

She first worked in advertising, but in the 1980s Asmara began writing songs, with her first released song being "Susie Bhelel", sung by Fariz RM for his 1989 album Fashionova.

She entered filmmaking by producing commercials and the music video for KLa Project's "Tak Bisa Ke Lain Hati". Although she wanted to make a featured length film, she feared that the Suharto-era government would censor any film she made. As such, her initial scripts went unfilmed.

She rose to prominence with the release of her directorial debut, Biola Tak Berdawai (The Stringless Violin), in 2003. She also wrote the script and assisted in the production of the film.

== Style ==
In contrast to the increasingly frank depiction of sexuality by female writers such as Ayu Utami after the fall of the New Order, Asmara's works take a more conservative view. Tineke Hellwig of the University of British Columbia, Biola Tak Berdawai is anti-feminist to the point of being misogynistic. Her female characters are often pregnant or have undergone an abortion; several also have cancer of the reproductive organs. According to Hellwig, the traditional view of women being loving mothers is idealized in Asmara's works, but rarely shown.

== Personal life ==
Asmara is a fan of musicals, and has noted that she has already written one that she hopes to make if there is enough money; she has already written the songs for it. She also likes the Hindu epic Mahabharata. She has stated that she writes about things that "other people are not producing".

== Awards and recognition ==
Asmara received the Best New Director award at the 2003 Cairo International Film Festival for Biola Tak Berdawai.

== Filmography ==
- Ca-Bau-Kan (2001, as music producer)
- Biola Tak Berdawai (The Stringless Violin, 2003, as writer, producer, and director)
- Belahan Jiwa (Soulmates, 2003, as writer and director)
- Telanjang? (Naked?, 2006, as writer and director)
- Pesan Dari Surga (Message from Heaven, 2006, as writer and director)
- Selamanya (Forever, 2007, as writer)

== Publications ==
- Pintu Terlarang (The Forbidden Door, 2004)
- Kembar Keempat (Fourth Twin, 2005)
- Doa Ibu (Mother's Prayers, 2009)
