= Hannah Al Rashid =

British actress, model, and activist (born 1986)

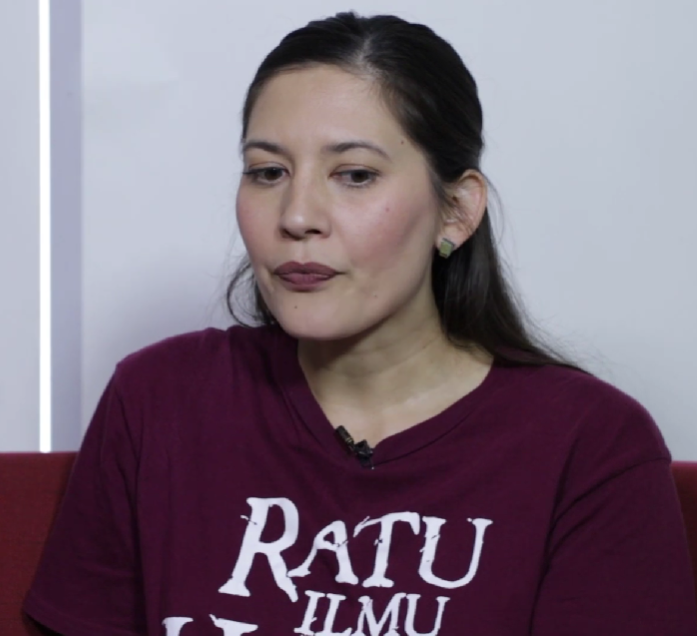
- Born: Hannah Aidinal Al Rashid; 25 January 1986 (age 40); London, England
- Occupations: Actress; model; activist
- Years active: 2007–present
- Spouse: Nino Fernandez (m. 2021)

Hannah Al Rashid (born 25 January 1986) is a British-Indonesian actress, model, and activist. Of Bugis and French descent, she is mostly known for her works in Indonesian films and television. For her role in Aruna & Her Palate (2018), she received Citra Award and Maya Award nominations for Best Supporting Actress.

== Early life ==
Hannah Aidinal Al Rashid was born on 25 January 1986 in London to a French mother and an Indonesian father of Bugis descent from South Sulawesi. She graduated from the School of Oriental and African Studies at the University of London with a degree on Indonesian and Development Studies. She grew up in London and moved to Indonesia in 2008.

== Career ==
Al Rashid came to her father's home country Indonesia initially to work for the United Nations Development Programme. However, the plan fell through and she instead found job offers to star in a series of music videos for popular pop band Yovie & Nuno's singles off their 2007 album The Special One. In 2010, she became a Guest VJ on MTV Indonesia.

Her first venture in acting was in the comedy television show Awas Ada Sule, starring popular comedian Sule. Her appearance in Joko Anwar's psychological thriller Ritual in 2012 garnered her mainstream recognition, followed by roles in anthology films 3Sum and V/H/S/2 in 2013.

Her big breakthrough came with a supporting role in the commercially successful comedy films Comic 8: Casino Kings Part 1 in 2015 and Comic 8: Casino Kings Part 2 in 2016, the latter of which earned her a nomination for Best Supporting Actress at the Indonesian Box Office Movie Awards 2017, losing to Asri Welas (Check the Store Next Door). Also in 2016, she appeared in Warkop DKI Reborn: Jangkrik Boss! Part 1 and received another nomination at the Indonesian Box Office Movie Awards 2017 in the Best Actress category, this time losing to Chelsea Islan (Rudy Habibie). As of January 2021, Warkop DKI Reborn: Jangkrik Boss! Part 1 is Indonesia's highest-grossing domestic film with 6.8 million admissions. She also appeared in the sequel, Warkop DKI Reborn: Jangkrik Boss! Part 2 which was released in 2017. Her other films in 2017 included the reboot of Jailangkung and an adaptation of Ika Natassa's best-selling novel Critical Eleven.

In 2018, Al Rashid co-starred in the Indonesian-Singaporean western film Buffalo Boys, Edwin's adaptation of Laksmi Pamuntjak's best-selling novel Aruna & Her Palate opposite top stars Dian Sastrowardoyo, Oka Antara, and Nicholas Saputra, as well as Timo Tjahjanto's Netflix action thriller The Night Comes for Us as an assassin. In 2019, Al Rashid briefly appeared in Joko Anwar's Gundala as the character Cantika the Nurse, one of Pengkor's orphan assassins. She then had a major role in Kimo Stamboel's The Queen of Black Magic as Nadya, wife to Ario Bayu's character Hanif.

She will next star in the British action-thriller film Exiled: The Chosen Ones set for a 2021 release date.

== Personal life ==
Al Rashid is known for her activism and identifies as a feminist. She often uses her social media platforms to spread social and political messages, which is uncommon among celebrities in Indonesia. She is a United Nations Sustainable Development Goals Mover for Gender Equality.

Hannah reportedly dated actor Ario Bayu in 2010. This was revealed when Hannah accompanied Ario in the launch of the film titled Catatan Si Boy.

In December 2020, Al Rashid and fellow actor Nino Fernandez announced on separate Instagram posts that they have been married for a few years. The marriage was kept secret and was never reported on the media up to that point. They live together in London.

== Filmography ==
=== Film ===
Year	Title	Role	Notes
2012	Ritual	Woman	
2013	3Sum	Lina	Segment: "Impromptu"
2013	V/H/S/2	Lena	Segment: "Safe Haven"
2014	You Can't Hear Me You Can't See Me	May	Short film
2015	Melancholy Is a Movement	Hannah	
2015	Comic 8: Casino Kings Part 1	Bella	
2015	Skakmat	Mami Tuti	
2015	Bulan Terbelah di Langit Amerika	Jasmine	
2016	Comic 8: Casino Kings Part 2	Bella	
2016	Warkop DKI Reborn: Jangkrik Boss! Part 1	Sophie	
2016	Bulan Terbelah di Langit Amerika 2	Jasmine	
2016	Pre Vis Action	Young Warrior	Short film
2017	Critical Eleven	Tarra	
2017	Jailangkung	Angel	
2017	Warkop DKI Reborn: Jangkrik Boss! Part 2	Sophie	
2018	Jailangkung 2	Angel	
2018	Buffalo Boys	Adri	
2018	Aruna & Her Palate	Nadezhda	
2018	The Night Comes for Us	Elena	
2019	Gundala	Motila / Camar (Cantika the Nurse)	
2019	The Queen of Black Magic	Nadya	
2021	Exiled: The Chosen Ones	Amber Chase	Post-production
2021	Perception	Laila Hart	
2021	Never Back Down: Revolt	Lori	
2022	Feed Me	Alex	

=== Television ===
Year	Title	Role	Notes
2009–2010	Awas Ada Sule	Bu Tiyo	Main role
2012	iSkul Musikal	Ibu Hannah	Main role
2015	Halfworlds	Marni	Main role
2016	Kelas Internasional	Dennisse	Guest
2016	Indonesia Lawak Klub	Herself	Guest
2016	Stand Up Comedy Academy	Herself	Guest
2016	Waktu Indonesia Bercanda	Herself	Guest
2018	DOSA: Sacred Sin	Zsa Zsa	Main role
2023	The Talent Agency	Amel	Main role

=== Music video ===
Year	Song title	Artist
2007	"Dia Milikku"	Yovie & Nuno
2008	"Janji Suci"	Yovie & Nuno
2008	"Sejuta Cinta"	Yovie & Nuno
2012	"Cinta Untuknya"	Naif

== Awards and nominations ==
Year	Award	Category	Work	Result
2016	Indonesian Box Office Movie Award	Best Actress	Warkop DKI Reborn: Jangkrik Boss! Part 1	Nominated
2016	Indonesian Box Office Movie Award	Best Supporting Actress	Comic 8: Casino Kings Part 2	Nominated
2018	38th Citra Awards	Best Supporting Actress	Aruna & Her Palate	Nominated
2018	7th Maya Awards	Best Actress in a Supporting Role	Aruna & Her Palate	Nominated
