= Cosmopolitan FM =

Radio station in Jakarta, Indonesia

PM2FAP
- Central Jakarta, DKI Jakarta; Indonesia
- Broadcast area: Jakarta metropolitan area and surrounding regencies
- Frequency: 90.4 MHz
- Branding: 90.4 Cosmopolitan FM Hits You Love

Programming
- Language: Indonesian
- Format: Contemporary hit radio

Ownership
- Owner: RCS Studio
- Operator: PT Radio Muara Abdi Nusa
- Sister stations: 87.6 Hard Rock FM, 101.4 FM I-Radio, Trax, 103.8 Brava Radio

History
- First air date: 14 February 1992 (format switch: 14 February 2002)

Technical information
- Class: A

Links
- Website: https://www.cosmopolitan.co.id/radio

PM2FAP (90.4 FM), on-air name 90.4 Cosmopolitan FM, is a radio station in Jakarta, Indonesia. It is under license of Cosmopolitan magazine and is the only station in the world that uses Cosmopolitan magazine's name. Radio Muara Abdinusa has then completely abandoned its dangdut programming on 14 February 2002. Today, Radio Muara Abdinusa only broadcasts Contemporary Hits Radio programming

== Jingles ==
Cosmopolitan FM Jingle from 2002–present

- We Play The Hits You Love, 90,4 Cosmopolitan FM
