= Aruna & Her Palate =

2018 Indonesian drama film

- Aruna & Her Palate
- Indonesian: Aruna & Lidahnya
- Directed by: Edwin
- Written by: Titien Wattimena
- Based on: The Birdwoman's Palate by Laksmi Pamuntjak
- Produced by: Muhammad Zaidy; Meiske Taurisia; Kwon Sik Kim; Justin Kim
- Starring: Dian Sastrowardoyo; Nicholas Saputra; Hannah Al Rashid; Oka Antara; Ayu Azhari
- Cinematography: Amalia T. S.
- Edited by: W. Ichwan Diardono
- Music by: Ken Jenie; Mar Galo
- Production companies: Palari Films; GoStudio; CJ Entertainment; Phoenix Films; Ideosource Entertainment
- Release date: 27 September 2018
- Running time: 106 minutes
- Countries: Indonesia; South Korea; Singapore
- Language: Indonesian
- Box office: 4.8 billion IDR

Aruna & Her Palate (Indonesian: Aruna & Lidahnya) is an Indonesian drama film based on the novel The Birdwoman's Palate by Laksmi Pamuntjak. It stars Dian Sastrowardoyo, Nicholas Saputra, Hannah Al Rashid, Oka Antara, and Ayu Azhari. Directed by Edwin, it is the second film produced by Palari Films, this time in collaborations with CJ Entertainment, Phoenix Films, and GoStudio. The story focuses on the friendships and romantic entanglement involving two men and two women all in their 30s with thematic references to local culinary wealth. Dian Sastrowardoyo stars as an epidemiologist tasked to investigate a suspected bird flu outbreak.

The film was released on 27 September 2018 and performed moderately at the box office and received mixed reviews from critics. At the 38th Citra Awards, it won Best Supporting Actor (Nicholas Saputra) and Best Adapted Screenplay out of eight nominations, which includes Best Picture, a second Best Director nomination in a row for Edwin following his win the previous year, and an acting nomination each in the lead actor, lead actress, and lead supporting actress for Oka Antara, Dian Sastrowardoyo, and Hannah Al Rashid respectively.

== Synopsis ==
Aruna Rai (Dian Sastrowardoyo), an epidemiologist and foodie living in Jakarta, is assigned by her company to investigate an outbreak of new avian flu cases throughout Indonesia for the government agency PWP2. She decides to take her friend Bono (Nicholas Saputra), a professional chef who wants to find authentic Indonesian recipes, so that he can explore the culinary traditions of each region. Nadezhda (Hannah Al Rashid), a culinary critic who wants to write a book on Indonesian cuisine, also joins them.

They first go to Surabaya, where Aruna's former supervisor, Farish (Oka Antara), who now works for PWP2, joins the investigation. Bono and Nazheda suspect Aruna is secretly in love with Farish; Aruna denies this and points out he has a girlfriend. As they investigate without much success, Aruna's carefree personality clashes with Farish's strict and professional demeanor. Their next stop is in Pamekasan, where they discover that the sole patient was actually misdiagnosed with pneumonia, causing them to question the data. After she spots Nadezdha talking about one of her past affairs with Farish, she becomes jealous.

In Pontianak, she tries to find a style of nasi goreng cooked by a maid from the area that she had eaten in her childhood. During their investigation, Aruna and Farish don't find any patients but discover some new medical equipment that was delivered to the hospital. Aruna suspects that there is some corruption going on and that PWP2 officials are making up an epidemic to embezzle money, but Farish doubts this.

At their last stop in Singkawang, Farish changes his mind and agrees with Aruna that there is something going on. He also reveals that his girlfriend is an older woman who is married to someone else. At the hospital, Farish decides to resign, and his supervisor Priya tells Aruna that she is no longer needed. Aruna confronts Farish and accuses him of having told Priya about her suspicions. As she tries to figure out what his motivations were, she assumes that Priya is Farish's girlfriend. Frustrated, Aruna goes back to Pontianak to find her nasi goreng. Bono and Nadezhda decide to follow her; when Farish tries to join them, Bono punches him. Farish says that he had not come for Priya, but for Aruna, and rents a scooter to find her on his own.

On the way, Bono finally confesses his love to Nadezhda, who accepts. While looking, Aruna calls her mother, who tells her that it was actually her recipe, not the maid's. Afterwards, Farish and Aruna meet and admit their feelings for each other. Ten months later, Aruna has successfully exposed the corruption and has learned how to cook her childhood nasi goreng. Bono has integrated Pontianak's cuisine into his restaurant successfully, and the two couples happily dine before the film ends.

== Cast ==
- Dian Sastrowardoyo as Aruna
- Oka Antara as Farish
- Nicholas Saputra as Bono
- Hannah Al Rashid as Nadezhda
- Ayu Azhari as Priya
- Desta Mahendra as Burhan

== Production ==
=== Development ===
Palari Films intended to produce a film adaptation of the 2014 novel Seperti Dendam, Rindu Harus Dibayar Tuntas by Eka Kurniawan. They picked up the film rights in 2016 but the adaptation process took longer than expected, prompting Edwin to pursue Laksmi Pamuntjak's The Birdwoman's Palate first instead. Producer Meiske Taurisia describes it as a loose adaptation as it does not follow the novel strictly. Edwin said that he had been interested in leading a film adaptation of the book after reading it. Producer Muhammad Zaidy said that Edwin was chosen as the director not only because he was part of Palari Films, but also because he was the one to propose the project. Edwin later met with Pamuntjak to discuss the possibility of the adaptation.

=== Casting ===
The film reunites Dian Sastrowardoyo and Nicholas Saputra who rose to popularity in the 2002 high school romantic drama hit Ada Apa dengan Cinta?. Aside from its sequel Ada Apa Dengan Cinta? 2, this is the only other film that the two have appeared on screen together. With the two joining Oka Antara, Hannah Al Rashid, and Ayu Azhari, Pamuntjak expressed that she was impressed by the film's cast, having commented "It's almost like writing the book with these actors in mind because they're very suitable to play the roles".

=== Filming ===
The production process involved local filmmakers in West Kalimantan. Food stylist Puji Purnama was taken on for the shooting process. The film cost more to produce than Posesif despite cutting the number of locations in half due to high costs of equipment and transportation. The five locations are Jakarta, Surabaya, Pamekasan, Pontianak, and Singkawang. The locations were chosen based on various factors, including logistical requirements and expenses. Production ended on 25 May 2018 after 25 days of shooting. The 21 Indonesian dishes described in the film, chosen based on various considerations during research and pre-production while staying true to the original source included bakmi kepiting, chai kue, pengkang, Pontianak-style fried rice, rawon, lorjuk, soto lamongan, rujak soto, sup buntut, kacang kuah, madumongso, and mi loncat.

For the Lantern Festival scene, the crew needed a lot of local extras and bit parts in Singkawang with the ability to speak in Javanese with a Surabayan dialect. Real lanterns were installed in street corners with an actual dragon dance performance taking place to make the scene look more vibrant.

== Music ==
The film uses a mix of older and newer songs. Music arrangers Ken Jenie and Mar Galo add old jazz pop nuances with well-known songs such as January Christy's "Aku Ini Punya Siapa", a cover of Jingga's "Tentang Aku" by Fe Utomo, a cover of Andre Hehanusa's "Antara Kita" by Monita Tahalea, as well as newer songs such as Yura's "Takkan Apa" and Mondo Gascaro's "Lebuh Rasa" and "Lamun Ombak".

== Marketing ==
A week before the film's release, four types of dishes associated with each of the four key characters were sold in the cafeteria of the XXI Cineplex theaters to the last day of the film's screening. These dishes were Aruna's fried rice, Bono's waffle with palm sugar, Farish's french fries with sweet sauce, and Nadezhda's iced milk coffee with pandan. Additionally, Palari Films uploaded four videos on YouTube called "Cooking with Bono", in which Nicholas Saputra cooks with celebrity guests.

== Release ==
The film poster was released on 12 July 2018, followed by a teaser for the film which was published online four days later and a trailer on 9 August 2018. It was released theatrically in Indonesia on 27 September 2018. In March 2019, it was screened at the CinemAsia Film Festival in Amsterdam, the Netherlands and the Osaka Asian Film Festival in Osaka, Japan.

== Reception ==
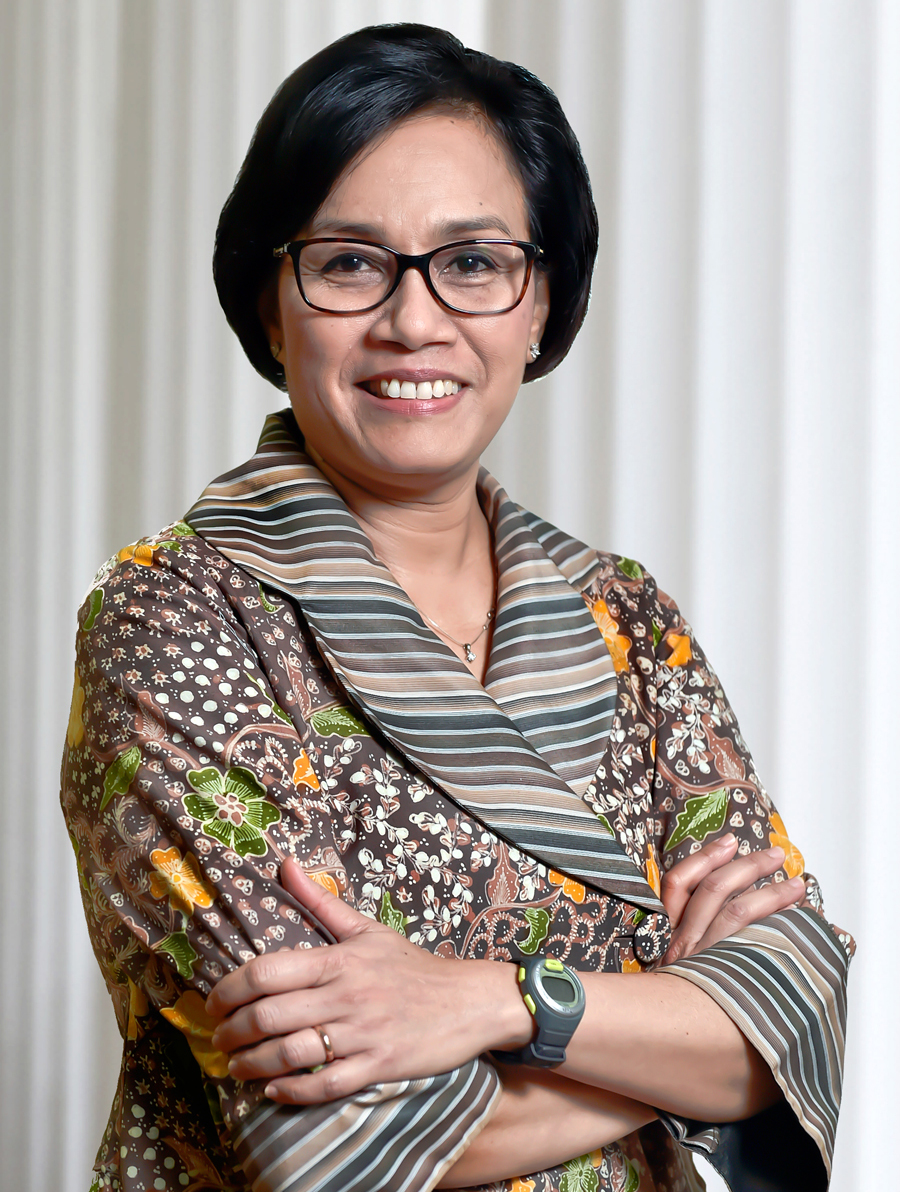
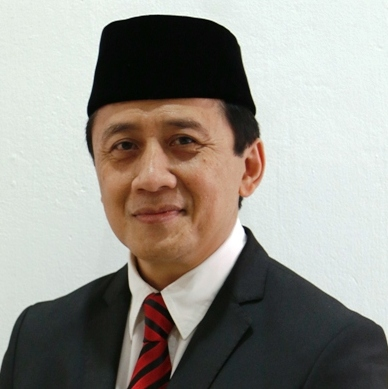
Finance Minister Sri Mulyani (left) and Creative Economy Agency Chief Triawan Munaf (right) both praise the film's use of local traditions and culinary to promote Indonesia.

=== Box office ===
Despite its star-studded cast and positive audience impression, the film failed to make an impression at the domestic box office. It recorded about 130 thousand admissions only after two weeks of release and ended its run with 165 thousand admissions. This was lower than two other films released also on September 27: the teen romance Something in Between which scored 180 thousand admissions and the supernatural horror Arwah Tumbal Nyai the Trilogy: Part Arwah with 250 thousand admissions.

Overall, it is estimated that the film grossed Rp 4.8 billion in Indonesia. Responding to the lackluster reception, Producer Zaidy pointed out that there are opportunities for the film to reach a wider market thanks to the collaboration with South Korean production company CJ Entertainment although it was also still uncertain. In light of the COVID-19 pandemic, the film was released on streaming platforms Netflix and GoPlay in 2020.

=== Critical response ===
Writing Kompas, Francisca Romana Ninik praised the film's treatment of the themes of friendship, public corruption, and religion with heavy culinary references but found it too cliché. Wening Gitomartoyo of The Jakarta Post described the food shots as "slightly pornographic" and praised the film's cinematography.

Aulia Adam of Tirto.id also wrote that Edwin delivers a "heartwarming romantic comedy" in contrast with his darker, cold, and bitter themes of his previous films, such as capitalism in the short film Kara, Anak Sebatang Pohon (2005), systematic discrimination against Chinese-Indonesians and military oppression in Blind Pigs Who Want to Fly (2009), and toxic relationship in Posesif (2017).

Due to their popular performances in the Ada Apa dengan Cinta? films, the relationship between Dian Sastrowardoyo and Nicholas Saputra in the film was extensively examined by the media. Muhammad Andika Putra of CNN Indonesia praised the two for breaking out of their high school couple image, while Devy Octaviany of Detik found their characters more cheerful than the popular characters of Cinta and Rangga.

The film also attracted the attention of several top government officials. Finance Minister Sri Mulyani commented that the film explores "our culture, feelings, way of socializing, and culinary wealth that we still don't know about", whereas the Creative Economy Agency Chief Triawan Munaf, father of actress Sherina Munaf, called the film "an effective way to promote Indonesian cinema and cuisine".

Reviewers from outside Indonesia have been less positive. Richard Kuipers of Variety felt that while the execution was good and the actors had great performances, singling out Aruna's narration in the film, the story "struggles at first to balance its fun-and-food aspects with the downbeat reality of a looming heath crisis". Wendy Ide of Screen International thought that Aruna's narration is a "flippant but engaging device" but thought that the film relied too much on food shots.

Aruna's secondary role as a narrator for the audience was also examined. Purba Wirastama wrote for MetroTV about how Aruna's point of view controls the narrative of the film, noting Edwin's approach to visualizing Aruna's inner voice. Richard Kuipers of Variety felt that Aruna's interactions gave a picture of Aruna's inner feelings, which are often different from what is shown. Wening Ide of Screen International thought that Aruna's side role was a manifestation of the feeling of restraint that could not be separated from Aruna who was used to being protected and processing her feelings in her own mind. This is evidenced by the many scenes that present his side role to the audience with various expressions that encourage the audience to find out what their true heart is which is not even revealed to their friends.

== Awards and nominations ==
Year	Award	Category	Recipients	Result
2018	38th Citra Awards	Best Picture	Aruna & Her Palate	Nominated
2018	38th Citra Awards	Best Director	Edwin	Nominated
2018	38th Citra Awards	Best Actor	Oka Antara	Nominated
2018	38th Citra Awards	Best Actress	Dian Sastrowardoyo	Nominated
2018	38th Citra Awards	Best Supporting Actor	Nicholas Saputra	Won
2018	38th Citra Awards	Best Supporting Actress	Hannah Al Rashid	Nominated
2018	38th Citra Awards	Best Adapted Screenplay	Titien Wattimena	Won
2018	38th Citra Awards	Best Original Score	Ken Jenie & Mar Galo	Nominated
2018	38th Citra Awards	Best Editing	W. Ichwan Diardono	Nominated
2018	8th Maya Awards	Best Feature Film	Aruna & Her Palate	Nominated
2018	8th Maya Awards	Best Director	Edwin	Nominated
2018	8th Maya Awards	Best Actress	Dian Sastrowardoyo	Nominated
2018	8th Maya Awards	Best Supporting Actor	Nicholas Saputra	Nominated
2018	8th Maya Awards	Best Adapted Screenplay	Titien Wattimena	Nominated
2018	8th Maya Awards	Best Supporting Actress	Hannah Al Rashid	Nominated
2018	8th Maya Awards	Best Art Direction	Iqbal Marjono	Nominated
2018	8th Maya Awards	Best Theme Song	"Antara Kita" by Monita Tahalea	Nominated
2018	2nd Tempo Film Festival	Best Director	Edwin	Nominated
2018	2nd Tempo Film Festival	Best Actress	Dian Sastrowardoyo	Nominated
2018	2nd Tempo Film Festival	Best Supporting Actor	Nicholas Saputra	Nominated
2018	Jogja-NETPAC Asian Film Festival	Best Cinematography	Amalia T. S.	Won
2018	Film Censorship Board Awards	Best Film Classified 17+	Aruna & Her Palate	Won
2019	Osaka Asian Film Festival	ABC Award	Edwin	Won
