= Adiguna Sutowo =

Indonesian businessman and murderer (1958–2021)

- Born: May 31, 1958; Jakarta, Indonesia
- Died: 18 April 2021 (aged 62); Jakarta
- Spouses: Indri (married 1977); Vika (married 1990)
- Children: 5
- Parent(s): Ibnu Sutowo; Zaleha
- Criminal charges: Murder, illegal possession of firearm and ammunition
- Penalty: 7 years, released in under 3 years

Adiguna Sutowo (31 May 1958 – 18 April 2021) was an Indonesian businessman and convicted murderer, whose business group’s interests included Hard Rock Cafe Jakarta. He was found guilty in 2005 of murdering a waiter at the Sutowo family's Jakarta Hilton Hotel (subsequently renamed Sultan Hotel). He was sentenced to seven years in jail but was released in less than three years. He died on 18 April 2021 at Jakarta's Pertamina Central Hospital.

== Early life and education ==
Adiguna was born in Jakarta on 31 May 1958. He is the youngest of seven children born to Ibnu Sutowo and Zaleha. His siblings are: Nuraini Zaitun Kamarukmi Luntungan, Endang Utari Mokodompit, Widarti, Pontjo Nugro Susilo, Sri Hartati Wahyuningsih, and Handara.

His father headed state oil and gas company Pertamina from 1957 until 1976, by which time his corrupt mismanagement had enabled him to amass an enormous family fortune and nearly bankrupted the company, despite the global oil boom of the 1970s.

Adiguna attended Senior High School IV in Gambir, Central Jakarta. As the youngest son, he was reportedly spoiled by his mother and was allowed to drive his own Mercedes-Benz sports car to school. A former high school classmate recalled Adiguna often skipped class to go hunting in the jungle with his gang but managed to keep his grades up.

Adiguna attended the University of Southern California to study business. He returned to Indonesia in 1981 to commence his business career.

== 2004 Kemang gun incident ==
In October 2004, Adiguna threatened to kill David Reynaldo Titawono (then 22), the nephew of rock musician Achmad Albar and singer Camelia Malik. The incident took place in Kemang, South Jakarta, reportedly at a property of Indonesian KFC franchise owner Ricardo Gelael, who is the husband of Albar’s ex-wife, Rini S. Bono. Some accounts said Adiguna, who was accompanied by his bodyguards, shot David through or near his ear. After the incident, police revoked Adiguna’s firearms license and confiscated a gun that fired rubber bullets.

According to local media reports, an altercation had occurred between David and one of Adiguna's nephews, prompting Adiguna to intervene. Ricardo Gelael did not report the incident to police, but the family of Albar did. Adiguna and Ricardo were then questioned at Jakarta Police headquarters, but the case was later settled by the two families and the Albar family retracted the police report. Camelia Malik confirmed to Gatra magazine that “Adiguna accidentally shot my nephew with an air rifle, and only about his ears."

== New Year's Day murder ==
At about 4:47am on 1 January 2005, Adiguna shot dead a waiter, Yohanes Brachmans Haerudy Natong, better known as Rudy, at Jakarta Hilton Hotel’s Island Bar Fluid Club & Lounge, located on the first floor of the hotel.

Adiguna had celebrated the New Year at Jakarta's Dragonfly nightclub with his second wife, Vika Dewayani, and their companions Novia Herdiana alias Tinul and Thomas 'Tom' Edward Sisk. The group then went to the Hilton Hotel, where they first went to Adiguna's room. Some time after 3:00am, Adiguna, Tinul and Tom left the room and went to the Fluid Club, where they chatted with other people present. Tom went to the lounge, while at about 4:40am, Adiguna sat at the bar and Tinul stood beside him. Tinul ordered a vodka tonic for Adiguna and a lychee martini for herself. She asked Rudy if the drinks could be charged to her room. Rudy told her that was not possible, so Tinul settled the Rp150,000 bar tab with her HSBC Visa card. Adiguna then ordered another round of the same two drinks and attempted to pay with his BCA debit card. Rudy took the card and asked the cashier Hari Suprasto if it could be used. Hari replied the machine was not available. Rudy then returned the card to Tinul, who gave it to Adiguna. Rudy explained the card could not be accepted because the bar did not have a machine that could process it. The rejection upset Tinul. “Don’t you know who he is? He’s the biggest shareholder of this hotel!” she said, pointing at Adiguna, who was seated next to her.

Adiguna then was angered, stood up, took out a Smith & Wesson .22-caliber pistol from his trousers and held the gun at Rudy’s forehead. Police said Adiguna pulled the trigger twice, but no bullet fired until he pulled the trigger a third time, shooting Rudy in the head. The waiter collapsed and began to die. Adiguna then wiped the gun handle, handed the pistol to a disc jockey Werner Saferna alias Wewen, who was standing about one meter away. Adiguna then left the club.

Rudy’s body was carried out of the bar and taken to the hotel's Sutowo-Sutowo Medical Clinic. The body was later taken to Mintohardjo Naval Hospital on Jalan Bendungan Hilir, where Rudy was pronounced dead. His body was guarded by two Hilton security guards and a Fluid Club guard. Rudy’s fiancee, Riska Leliana, complained that the club's management had not apologized or offered any sympathy over the murder.

Later on 1 January, Jakarta Police declared Adiguna a suspect. His hotel room, Room 1564, contained 19 bullets of the type that had killed Rudy. The bullets had been hidden in the toilet. Media reports, quoting initial police findings, said Adiguna was high on crystal methamphetamine and alcohol at the time of the killing. Adiguna had a nosebleed on the morning of the murder. Police found bloodstained towels, tissues and a handkerchief in his room at the Hilton. Police initially thought the blood might have come from Rudy, but a forensic examination indicated the blood came from Adiguna. Detikcom online news portal quoted a police source as saying the nosebleed could have been the result of nasal inhalation of narcotics because the suspect had a propensity for that method of drug taking.

Adiguna denied shooting Rudy. He told police he had only passed through Fluid Club looking for his daughter. He denied sitting at the bar. He denied talking to Tinul. He denied carrying a pistol. He claimed he had helped to carry Rudy, which caused blood to get on his shirt. However, his lawyer said the blood on the shirt had come Adiguna and not from Rudy.

Wewen, who had received the murder weapon from Adiguna, kept the pistol at his house for five days before handing it over to police and giving a statement. A police ballistics examination matched the pistol to the bullet fired into Rudy’s head.

The Jakarta Post newspaper and detikcom online news portal in January 2005 quoted police as claiming that Adiguna was a cocaine user. His lawyer denied that Adiguna uses narcotics. National Police chief of detectives Commissioner General Suyitno Landung Sudjono in January 2005 said samples of Adiguna's blood and urine tested positive to illegal drugs: methamphetamine and phenmetrazine.

By early February 2005, police said they were still gathering evidence and awaiting results to charge Adiguna with narcotics offenses, separate from the murder and firearm charges. Police later claimed that subsequent tests of Adiguna's fingernail and hair samples were negative, so the drugs charges were withdrawn. Police Detective chief Suyitno Landung, who was later jailed for taking bribes in a separate case, declined to explain why the results were different from the blood and urine tests.

The Hilton, rebadged ‘The Sultan’ in the aftermath of the killing, is owned by Adiguna's older brother Pontjo Nugro Susilo, who is more commonly known as Pontjo Sutowo.

The 25-year-old victim, Rudy, was from a low-income family on Flores island in East Nusa Tenggara province and had been working part-time at the Hilton to support his law studies at Jakarta's Bung Karno University. He also supported his two younger siblings. He was due to have graduated in 2005. His parents were initially informed he had been shot dead during a protest against fuel price rises in Jakarta.

Before Adiguna’s trial commenced, his brother Pontjo Sutowo traveled to Flores, where he presented Rudy’s family with a traditional condolence gesture of a cow's head. He also handed over an undisclosed amount of money. Rudy's father wrote a letter, later produced in court, asking the judges to give as light a sentence as possible to Adiguna.

Following his arrest, Adiguna was initially detained at Jakarta Police detention center. He was later transferred to Jakarta's Salemba jail, where he stayed in Block K, which is described as the "executive wing". Other high-profile inmates of Block K at the time included Aceh governor Abdullah Puteh and Golkar Party tycoon Nurdin Halid. Lawyer Amir Karyatim said Adiguna was able to laugh in the jail and could order coffee from Starbucks and nasi padang.

== Murder trial ==
Prosecutors delayed the start of Adiguna’s trial on the grounds that he required hospitalization because of an “asthma attack”. After the trial commenced on 22 March 2005 at Central Jakarta District Court, he was “too sick” to attend some sessions. On other occasions, he arrived late to the court.

Despite being absent on medical grounds, he did have supporters present. These supporters were often dressed in white robes and described by the media as "hired thugs" trying to intimidate the Christian victim's family and the judges.

The charge of murder with intent but without premeditation carries a maximum sentence of 20 years, while illegal possession of an unregistered firearm and ammunition carries a maximum sentence of life imprisonment. Rudy’s fiancee, Riska Leliana, said she hoped Adiguna would get the death penalty, but she was pessimistic about the Indonesian legal system. Prosecutors recommended a life sentence.

In preparing the case, police had taken statements from 20 witnesses over the murder. Many of the witnesses subsequently retracted their statements or gave conflicting testimony during the trial.

Tinul retracted her police statements, in which she had admitted to witnessing the murder. She told the court that she had asked “the waiter” whether she could charge the drinks to her room, and he had told her that she could not. She said she then handed the vodka tonic to Adiguna and told him she could not charge his drink to her room, but she had already paid for it. She then claimed she got up and walked away, heard a gunshot and ran away without looking back. Then she claimed she informed Adiguna’s wife Vika that “something has happened downstairs and I am worried about Guna”.

Harry Gunawan Isa, the head of bar housekeeping, also changed his account. He initially told police he saw someone who 50% resembled Adiguna point a pistol at Rudy, then heard two clicking noises followed by a gunshot and realized Rudy had been shot in the head. But in court he denied hearing any clicking noises and said he was no longer certain the gunman resembled Adiguna.

Disk jockey, Werner Saferna alias Wewen (35 at the time), also gave testimony that conflicted with his original police statement. He told police he saw Adiguna shoot Rudy and saw the waiter fall to the floor. He said Adiguna then pushed the pistol into his hand and left. But in court, Wewen claimed he only glimpsed Adiguna’s hand pointing the pistol at Rudy’s head.

Adiguna was identified in court as the murderer by Cut Nina, a bartender on duty on the morning of the killing. She was standing two meters from Rudy when he was shot. She said she had heard Tinul attempt to intervene in an argument between Adiguna and Rudy, moments before the shooting. Fluid Club general manager Yerry Eka Nugraha testified in court that three of his staff had immediately after the shooting informed him that Adiguna shot Rudy.

On 16 June 2005, Central Jakarta District Court sentenced Adiguna to seven years in jail for murder with intent but without premeditation and illegal possession of an unregistered firearm and ammunition. Presiding judge Lilik Mulyadi said that although all of the accusations against Adiguna had been "legitimately proven", there were several mitigating factors to warrant a light sentence. The judge listed the extenuating circumstances as: Adiguna was still young, he had a family, he had been polite during the trial, it was his first offense, he had already been “morally punished” by media coverage, and his family had apologized for the murder. Adiguna was 47 at the time of sentencing. He never confessed in court to the crime. He was often absent from the court, but often deployed his supporters to the courthouse.

Lawyer Hendrik Jehaman, representing Rudy's family, said the judges had been influenced by the prominent stature of the defendant. Defense lawyer Mohammad Assegaf said seven years was unfair and he would appeal to Jakarta High Court. Chief prosecutor Andi Herman said the low sentence was “no problem, it's normal".

Indonesian law expert Tim Lindsey from Melbourne University said although it would have been inconceivable that "a son of a person like Ibnu Sutowo would have been convicted at all" under the Suharto era, "the sentence of seven years is absurdly light for such a violent and unprovoked and brutal murder".

=== Appeals, remissions and release ===
Adiguna appealed at Jakarta High Court, which in August 2005 upheld his seven-year sentence. He then appealed at the Supreme Court, which in January 2006 also upheld the sentence. A panel of three Supreme Court judges - Mariana Sutadi, Atja Sondjaja and Mieke Komar - said the rulings of the two lower courts were correct. They said the forgiveness letter from Rudy's father could not be considered, and that the Supreme Court could only consider a request for "relief" if there had been an error in the application of the law by the lower courts.

On 17 August 2006, Adiguna received a three-month sentence remission in connection with national Independence Day celebrations.

After the rejection of his first Supreme Court appeal, Adiguna filed a second appeal to the Supreme Court. In November 2007, a panel of three Supreme Court judges – Parman Soeparman, Djoko Sarwoko and Moegiharjo – reduced Adiguna’s sentence to four years, making him due for release in 2009. He was released on 14 December 2007 after the Justice Ministry gave him remissions on the grounds of good behavior. He had served fewer than three years in jail.

Following his release from jail, Adiguna was seen at Jakarta’s upmarket nightclubs. Jakarta Social Blog, a website devoted to the revels of the city’s wealthiest families, reported on Adiguna’s birthday party at the exclusive Blowfish Kitchen & Bar in May 2008 and listed a string of celebrity attendees. The report attracted critical comments, but these were outnumbered by people posting in Adiguna’s defense with comments such as “he’s accepted his mistake… he knows what he’s done is wrong (plus when he did it he wasn’t exactly “himself”)... now let him move on with his life & live a normal life.”

== Attack on second wife’s house ==
In October 2013, Adiguna was the subject of renewed media attention after a violent incident outside the house of his second wife, Vika Dewayani, in Pulomas, East Jakarta. Police said Adiguna’s driver, Dalyono, had on 25 October picked up Adiguna and a woman named Anastasia Florina “Flo” Limasnax from the Four Seasons Apartments and taken them to Bengkel Cafe at Pacific Place mall until 1.30am on 26 October, and later drove them to Pulomas.

Dalyono told police that Adiguna and Flo were intoxicated and when they arrived outside Vika’s house at about 2:00am, Flo ordered the driver to get out and open the gate, whereupon she got behind the wheel, crashed into the fence and rammed three of Adiguna’s luxury cars. Reports quoted Adiguna’s sister-in-law Sinta Saras as saying Flo was hysterical, screaming that she wanted to kill Vika. Vika was in Bali at the time of the attack, while the couple's two children were in the United States. Later, Vika filed a police complaint against Flo, who at the time was married to Satriyo “Piyu” Yudi Wahono, the lead guitarist of pop band Padi.

On 31 October, Adiguna and Piyu held a press conference. Piyu denied that Flo was involved in the incident at Vika's house. Then, Adiguna shouted at reporters and bashed his fist on a table, insisting he had smashed up his own cars because Vika was having an affair.

In November 2013, when questioned by police, Adiguna admitted he had been having an extra-marital affair with Flo for the past three years. Police said Adiguna and Flo had gone to Vika's house with the intention of telling her about the affair. Police spokesman Rikwanto confirmed Flo went berserk at the house, took the wheel of the car, smashed into the fence and rammed three cars on the property. Police said Adiguna told them he was asleep in the silver Mercedes throughout the attack and had not ordered Flo to cause the damage. "The initial plan to explain their increasingly close relationship to Vika was eventually canceled," said Rikwanto.

Police named Flo a suspect in the destruction of Vika's property. Flo's father then met with Vika to negotiate a peace letter, which was sent to police. Vika subsequently retracted her police report accusing Flo of vandalism.

On 11 February 2004, Vika sought police protection. Her lawyer alleged that Adiguna had threatened to throw her out of the house, which was owned by one of Adiguna’s subsidiary companies.

On 23 September 2015, Flo filed for divorce against Piyu at South Jakarta District Court, accusing him of failing to provide physical and mental support for the past two years. Piyu denied being at fault. Piyu’s lawyer would neither confirm nor deny an allegation that Piyu had been offered Rp9 billion to end his marriage with Flo. The couple eventually divorced on 15 February 2016.

== Business career ==
Adiguna’s business interests covered machinery, shipping, pharmaceuticals, property and hospitality, entertainment, media, automotive and explosives.

Adiguna was involved from a young age in his family's Nugra Santana Group, which inherited assets from family patriarch, Ibnu Sutowo, a three-star general who was viewed as the “treasurer” of the Suharto administration, as he led Pertamina, which generated revenue during the oil boom of the 1970s.

Upon completing university in Los Angeles in 1981, Adiguna returned to Indonesia to become president director of PT Adiguna Mesintani, which distributes diesel engine generators used to power hotels, factories and other enterprises. The company also manufactures heavy equipment used in offshore oil drilling activities.

He went on to manage PT Santana Petroleum Equipment and shipping company PT Pelayaran Umum Indonesia (Pelumin), from which Pertamina leased several tankers. Pelumin had three tankers with a capacity of 35,000 tons.

Adiguna partnered with Tommy Suharto and Soetikno Soedarjo at PT Mahasarana Buana (Mabuha) as Fokker's aircraft agent and sold 15 aircraft to Tommy Suharto's Sempati and Pelita Air Service in September 1985.

Adiguna owned an explosives supply company, as well as an explosives storage warehouse on Momoi Island, near Batam.

In 1993, Adiguna established PT Mugi Rekso Abadi (MRA) with Soetikno Soedardjo and Ongky Soemarmo (who was executive director of Tommy Suharto's Humpuss Group). In October 1992, the colleagues had established the Jakarta franchise of Hard Rock Cafe. The founding majority shareholders were Adiguna and Soetikno. Other shareholders included Irwan Subiarto, Ongky Soemarno and Yapto Suryosumarno. MRA's operations have covered restaurants, magazines and radio stations, luxury vehicles, entertainment and hotels.

Adiguna's son Maulana Indraguna Sutowo became CEO of MRA Group in January 2017.

Adiguna headed PT Suntri Sepuri, a pharmaceuticals company founded in 1998. It produces antibiotics, capsules, tablets, syrups and other medicines.

His other business interests included PT Adiguna Shipyard and PT Indobuild Co. The Sutowo family’s hotels included: Jakarta Hilton International (renamed the Sultan Hotel and Residence), Lagoon Tower Hilton, The Hilton Residence, Patra Surabaya Hilton, and Bali Hilton. Adiguna also owns Four Seasons Hotel and Four Seasons Apartment in Bali. He bought the Regent Hotel in Kuningan, Jakarta, and renamed it the Four Seasons Hotel.

The Nugra Santana group was hit hard by the 1997 Asian financial crisis. Bank Pacific, led by Adiguna’s sister Endang Utari Mokodompit, was liquidated by the government in November 1997.

=== KPK summonses ===
On 20 March 2018, Adiguna failed to meet a summons by the Corruption Eradication Commission (KPK) for questioning as a witness over alleged corruption and money laundering in Garuda Indonesia's procurement of aircraft and engines from Airbus SAS and Rolls-Royce PLC. Adiguna was re-summoned to appear on 11 April 2018 and again failed to appear, claiming to be ill. His son, Maulana Indraguna, was summoned over the same case and did appear for questioning on 10 April 2018. The two suspects in the Garuda bribery case were Emirsyah Satar and Soetikno Soedarjo, the latter being Adiguna's business partner. On 8 May 2020, Emirsyah was sentenced to 8 years in prison and fined Rp1 billion, while Soetikno Soedarjo was sentenced to 6 years in prison and fined Rp1 billion.

== Racing career ==
Adiguna was a professional car racer from the 1970s to the 1990s. His racing contemporaries included Tommy Soeharto, Ricardo Gelael, Soetikno Soedardjo and Onky Soemarno. In the 1990s, his co-driver was sometimes prominent rally driver Chepot Haniwiano. He competed in the Presidential Cup series seven times in the 1970s and 1980s.

The Jakarta Post quoted a rally driver as saying that Adiguna always got what he wanted and would do anything to get it. If someone was in his way on the racetrack, he would push them out of the way.

Adiguna was a chairman of the DKI Jaya chapter of the Indonesian Motorsports Association (IMI) for two terms, from 1989 to 1993 and from 1993 to 1997.

Adiguna had been a member of the Indonesian Shooting and Hunting Association (Perbakin).

== FKPPI ==
From 1993 to 1997, Adiguna was a deputy chairman of the Young Generation of the Communication Forum of Indonesian Veterans' Children (Gema FKPPI). FKPPI is a grouping of entrepreneurs whose business success has been attributed to their influential military parents. From February 1998 to October 2003, Adiguna was general chairman of Gema FKPPI. He was succeeded by his brother Pontjo Sutowo, who headed FKPPI from 2003 to 2008, during which period Adiguna was a deputy chairman. FKPPI promotes the values of state ideology Pancasila to counter terrorism, radicalism, and separatism. It has also blamed Indonesia’s problems on communists and foreigners. After his release from jail, Adiguna remained a deputy chairman of FKPPI.

== Family ==
In 1977, while still at high school, Adiguna married Indriana, the daughter of a former aide of president Suharto. They had three children. Their eldest son, Adri, died in 1993 in a traffic accident while driving a Mercedes-Benz on Jalan Sudirman, Jakarta. Their second son, Indraguna Maulana (born 1982), in 2010 married actress and model Dian Sastrowardoyo.

In 1990, Adiguna married his second wife, Vika, the niece of Bharata Band vocalist and bass player Harry Bharata. They had two children: Cecile Seruni and Herwinto. Ibnu Sutowo’s extended family reportedly disapproved of the marriage. Cecile in 2015 married Loed Fabian Mamoto, the son of senior policeman Inspector General Benny Mamoto, who previously headed the National Narcotics Agency's eradication task force.

== Death ==
Adiguna died at 4:04am on 18 April 2021 at Jakarta's Pertamina Hospital of undisclosed causes. He was taken to a funeral home in Menteng, before being buried later that day at Jakarta's Tanah Kusir cemetery. The burial was tightly guarded by members of FKPPI and Pemuda Pancasila. Among the mourners who scattered flowers over the grave were Dian Sastrowardoyo and Jakarta Regional Legislative Assembly chairman Prasetyo Edi Marsudi of the Indonesian Democratic Party of Struggle. Prasetyo praised Adiguna as "a good person" with whom he shared many memories.

Among the floral bereavement boards displayed at the funeral home and the cemetery were those in the names of: former state intelligence chief A.M. Hendropriyono, Golkar Party politician Hayani Isman, Indonesian National Board for Disaster Management (BNPB) head Lieutenant General Doni Monardo, former Army Special Forces (Kopassus) chief Major General Madsuni, and People's Consultative Assembly speaker Bambang Soesatyo's Justice Building Solidarity Movement (Gerak BS).
