= Soeratin Sosrosoegondo =

Chairman of PSSI from 1930 to 1940

- Born: 17 December 1898; Yogyakarta, Dutch East Indies
- Died: 1 December 1959 (aged 60); Bandung, Indonesia
- Occupation: Civil engineer
- Known for: First chairman of PSSI

Soeratin Sosrosoegondo (17 December 1898 – 1 December 1959) was an Indonesian civil engineer and football administrator in the colonial era who is one of the main founders of the Football Association of Indonesia (PSSI), the governing body of football in Indonesia as well as serving as its first chairman from 1930 to 1940.

== Early life and education ==
Born in Yogyakarta in the Dutch East Indies, Soeratin's family was amongst the educated class in the country. His father, R. Soesrosoegondo, was a kweekschool teacher and authored the book Bausastra Bahasa Jawi. He spent five years of his education at Koningen Wilhelmina School (KWS) in Batavia. After graduating from KWS, Soeratin enrolled in an advanced technical university at Heckelenburg, near Hamburg, Germany in 1920 and graduated as a civil engineer in 1927.

== Career and founding PSSI ==
Upon returning to his homeland in 1928, Soeratin was immediately employed by a Dutch construction company based in Yogyakarta, Sizten en Lausada, for a salary of around 1,000 Dutch guilders per month. During his time there, he was involved in construction projects for buildings and bridges at Tegal and Bandung, being in a position that is parallel to a commissioner in the company. He would later resign from Sizten en Lausada as his involvement in the national awakening grew.

An enthusiast of football, Soeratin realized that sports could be used as a platform to grow values of Indonesian nationalism amongst the native youth, in accordance with the ideas of the Youth Pledge. To achieve this goal, he met with leading football figures in Surakarta, Yogyakarta, Magelang, Bandung, and Batavia. These meetings were carried out in secrecy to avoid suspicion from the PID. His ideas also spread through personal contacts and couriers until on 19 April 1930, representatives from several football association gather in Yogyakarta for a congress to form Persatoean Sepakraga Seloeroeh Indonesia (PSSI) with Soeratin elected as its first chairman. Under his rule, the newly formed governing body started running its own competitions and forming local commissioners throughout the country.

== Later life and death ==
Alongside his activities with PSSI, Soeratin would start his own business which ran tumultuously before collapsing by the time Japan began their Dutch East Indies campaign. After PSSI became inactive, he would serve in the People's Security Army (TKR) where he would reach the rank of lieutenant colonel. His time in the TKR would lead to the Dutch ransacking his residence. After Indonesia proclaimed its independence, he was appointed as one of the chiefs in Djawatan Kereta Api until PSSI was reactivated. In his later years, Soeratin lived in poverty residing in a 4x6 meter house with woven bamboo walls. He struggled to afford medication for a long-term illness until passing away on 1 December 1959. He was buried in Sirnaraga Cemetery.

== Personal life and legacy ==
He was married to R.A. Srie Woelan, the younger sister of Soetomo, founder of Budi Utomo. He had three children and eight grandchildren, including Wuly Soekartono. The Soeratin Cup, a national youth football tournament in Indonesia, was named in his honour.

Sporting positions
New creation	Chairman of Football Association of Indonesia; 1930–1940	Succeeded by Artono Martosoewignyo
