= Cigarette Girl (TV series) =

2023 Indonesian television series

- Promotional poster
- Bahasa Indonesia: Gadis Kretek
- Genre: Romantic drama; Period drama
- Based on: Cigarette Girl by Ratih Kumala
- Screenplay by: Tanya Yuson; Ratih Kumala; Kanya K. Priyanti; Ambaridzki Ramadhantyo
- Directed by: Kamila Andini; Ifa Isfansyah
- Starring: Dian Sastrowardoyo; Ario Bayu; Putri Marino; Arya Saloka
- Country of origin: Indonesia
- Original languages: Indonesian; Javanese
- No. of episodes: 5

Production
- Producer: Fauzar Nurdin
- Cinematography: Batara Goempar
- Editor: Akhmad Fesdi Anggoro
- Camera setup: Single-camera
- Running time: 58–74 minutes
- Production company: BASE Entertainment

Original release
- Network: Netflix
- Release: 5 October 2023

Cigarette Girl (Indonesian: Gadis Kretek) is an Indonesian television series starring Dian Sastrowardoyo, Ario Bayu, Putri Marino, and Arya Saloka. Based on the book of the same name by Ratih Kumala, it is set against the backdrop of Indonesia's tobacco industry, which is closely intertwined with the country's history. The story is set in the 1960s and early 2000s, spanning two time periods with an estranged son searching for a girl from his father's past to fulfill the cigarette mogul's dying wish.

It had its world premiere at the 28th Busan International Film Festival during "On Screen" section on 5 October 2023, where three of five episodes were screened. It was released on 2 November 2023 on Netflix.

== Plot ==
In 2001, Raja, a terminally ill kretek manufacturer, has visions of his long-lost love, Jeng Yah, and tells his son Lebas to find her. Following a tip, Lebas goes to a kretek museum in Kota M. and meets Arum, a doctor who is intrigued by Lebas' photo of her mother Rukayah, and Jeng Yah, who turns out to be Rukayah's sister Dasiyah. From letters and testimony gathered from Dasiyah, Raja and Rukayah, they learn Raja and Jeng Yah's story.

In 1964, Dasiyah, the daughter of kretek manufacturer Idroes Moeria, wants to make new kretek flavors but is stymied by patriarchal forces. Raja, an employee, falls in love with Dasiyah and helps her make a rose-derived flavor. Dasiyah is arranged to be married to Seno, a soldier and son of another kretek manufacturer, but Dasiyah breaks their engagement and tells her parents of her relationship with Raja, prompting Idroes to fire him. Raja later convinces Idroes of Dasiyah's talent after he shows a sample of her kretek. Impressed, Idroes takes in Raja again, approves his engagement to Dasiyah, and markets her kretek under the brand Gadis Kretek (Cigarette Girl).

In 1966, soldiers ransack Dasiyah's residence while Idroes is arrested and mortally bludgeoned with a rifle after kreteks made by Raja's subversive friends are found in the house. Raja is shot in the leg when he tries to intervene, whereupon Dasiyah, who accompanies her father to prison, tells him to run. Raja goes into hiding and passes out on a warehouse owned by Idroes' rival, Djagad, and is nursed back to health by his daughter Purwanti. Djagad agrees to help Raja find Dasiyah, in exchange for Raja making a superior kretek. Raja returns to Dasiyah's now-empty residence and recovers her kretek recipe, which Djagad markets as his own to expand his business.

Frustrated by Djagad's refusal to fulfil his promise and make him a business partner, Raja marries Purwanti, who eventually begets Lebas and two other brothers. At the wedding reception, Raja sees the recently released Dasiyah, who, after two years in prison, feels betrayed by his marrying another and learning that Raja is using her kretek recipe. She dares Raja to leave Purwanti and start anew with her, but Raja, who is blackmailed by Djagad for his acquaintance with subversives, does not respond, prompting Dasiyah to leave. She and her family are taken in by Seno, who helps her move on by letting her create flavors for his kretek factory. They eventually marry but Seno is killed on duty. Dasiyah later gives birth to their daughter, who is revealed to be Arum.

In 1975, Raja encounters Dasiyah one last time at a train station. Raja confesses the truth about the theft of her recipe, adding that Djagad had framed Idroes out of jealousy and that he had told Seno about it before his death. Recovering her love, Dasiyah agrees to Raja's proposal that they elope in a week's time. But on their scheduled departure, Dasiyah fails to show up. It is later revealed that she had died of an illness aggravated by her imprisonment, after which Rukayah took on Arum as her own child.

Back in 2001, Arum takes Lebas to an artisanal kretek factory owned by Dasiyah's apprentice Eko. Upon trying their kretek, Lebas is told that this is Gadis Kretek and realizes that his father's recipe was stolen from Dasiyah after noticing that they taste the same. Returning home, he makes his family confront their past and tells Raja of Arum's existence. Raja meets with Arum, who leads him to Dasiyah's grave and reunites the couple.

Some time after Raja dies, Lebas returns to the museum and joins Arum as she seeks to learn more about her father.

== Cast ==
- Dian Sastrowardoyo as Dasiyah "Jeng Yah"
- Ario Bayu as Raja
- Arya Saloka as Lebas, Raja's free-spirited son
- Putri Marino as Arum
- Ibnu Jamil as Seno
- Sheila Dara Aisha as Purwanti
- Tissa Biani as Rukayah, Dasiyah's sister
- Nungki Kusumastuti as Rukayah in 2001
- Sha Ine Febriyanti as Roemaisa, Dasiyah and Roekayah's mother and Idroes' wife
- Rukman Rosadi as Idroes Moeria
- Verdi Solaiman as Djagad
- Tutie Kirana as Purwanti in 2001
- Pritt Timothy as Soeraja in 2001
- Winky Wiryawan as Tegar, Lebas' oldest brother
- Dimas Aditya as Karim, Lebas' older brother

== Production ==
In July 2022, confirming the production of Cigarette Girl based on novel Clove Girl by Ratih Kumala, Netflix announced the cast and crew of the film. Directed by Kamila Andini and Ifa Isfansyah and produced by BASE Entertainment with Shanty Harmayn and Tanya Yuson serving as showrunners, its screenplay is written by Tanya Yuson, Ratih Kumala, Kanya K. Priyanti and Ambaridzki Ramadhantyo. It has Dian Sastrowardoyo, Ario Bayu, Putri Marino and Arya Saloka as main cast, with Tissa Biani, Ine Febriyanti, Winky Wiryawan, Sheila Dara, Ibnu Jamil, Rukman Rosadi, Nungki Kusumastuti, Dimas Aditya, Pritt Timothy and Tutie Kirana in supporting roles.

== Release ==
The series had its premiere at the 28th Busan International Film Festival in 'On Screen section' on 5 October 2023. It was made available for streaming on 2 November on Netflix in selected regions.

== Episodes ==
All episodes were written by Tanya Yuson, Ratih Kumala, Kanya K. Priyanti and Ambaridzki Ramadhantyo and directed by Kamila Andini and Ifa Isfansyah.

No.	Title	Directed by	Written by	Original release date
1	"Jeng Yah"	Kamila Andini & Ifa Isfansyah	Tanya Yuson	2 November 2023
After hear his ailing father mention name of an unknown woman, Lebas begins looking for the woman. Jeng Yah meets Raja for the first time.
2	"Rose"	Kamila Andini & Ifa Isfansyah	Kanya Kamili Priyanti & Tanya Yuson	2 November 2023
Jeng Yah has six months left before her arranged mariage. Meanwhile, Lebas asks Arum for help to fulfill his father's last wish.
3	"Red"	Kamila Andini & Ifa Isfansyah	Ratih Kumala	2 November 2023
Lebas and Arum discover surprising things. Jeng Yah secretly experiments with new mixtures to create a variety of cigarette flavors.
4	"DR"	Kamila Andini & Ifa Isfansyah	Ambaridzki Ramadhantyo	2 November 2023
A disturbing incident changes the lives of Jeng Yah and Raja. Later, Lebas seeks out answers from his father.
5	"Lady Cigarette"	Kamila Andini & Ifa Isfansyah	Tanya Yuson	2 November 2023
Lebas and Arum are getting closer toward the answers they’re looking for. As his health declines, Raja struggled with various regrets of his past time.

== Accolades ==
Awards and nominations
Award	Year	Category	Nominee(s) / work(s)	Result	Ref.
Seoul International Drama Awards	2024	Best Mini Series-International Competition Program	Cigarette Girl	Won	
Asia Contents Awards & Global OTT Awards	2024	Best Creative	Cigarette Girl	Nominated	
Asia Contents Awards & Global OTT Awards	2024	Best Director	Kamila Andini & Ifa Isfansyah	Won	
Asia Contents Awards & Global OTT Awards	2024	Best Lead Actress	Dian Sastrowardoyo	Nominated	
Asia Contents Awards & Global OTT Awards	2024	Best Supporting Actor	Arya Saloka	Nominated	
Bandung Film Festival	2024	Outstanding Web Series	Cigarette Girl	Won	
Bandung Film Festival	2024	Outstanding Director for a Web Series	Kamila Andini & Ifa Isfansyah	Won	
Bandung Film Festival	2024	Outstanding Lead Actor in a Web Series	Ario Bayu	Nominated	
Bandung Film Festival	2024	Outstanding Supporting Actor in a Web Series	Arya Saloka	Won	
