= Hinca Panjaitan =

Indonesian politician

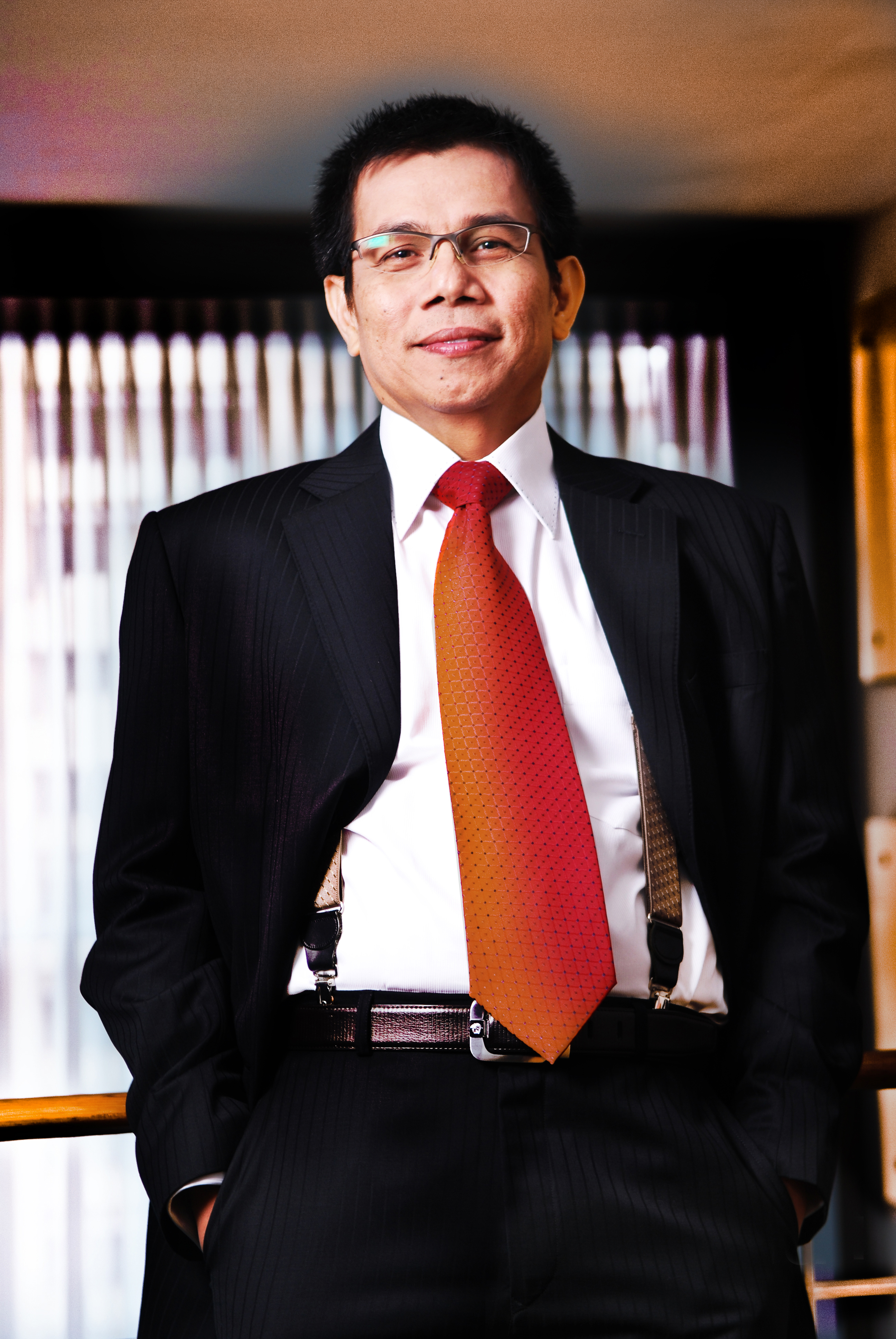
Portrait of Hinca Panjaitan

Hinca Panjaitan (born 25 September 1964 in Asahan, North Sumatra) is an Indonesian politician. He is the Secretary General of the Democratic Party since May 2015. Hinca also served as Chairman of the DPP-Public Communication Division Democrat and a member of the convention committee election of Democratic presidential candidate.

Hinca is also a PSSI board member. He had become Chairman of the Discipline Commission Football Association of Indonesia. At the PSSI congress on 18 April 2015 in Surabaya, Hinca was elected Vice Chairman of PSSI along with Erwin Dwi Budiawan.

== Careers ==
Hinca is an advocate and a member of the Indonesian Advocates Association. Hinca had worked as Assistant Lecturer at the Faculty of Law of HKBP Nommensen University, Medan from 1987 to 1999.
