= Mugi Rekso Abadi =

Indonesian holding company

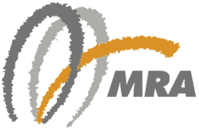

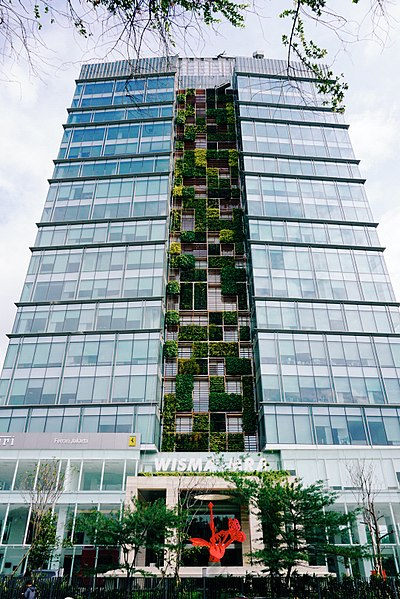
- Wisma MRA in Cilandak, Jakarta
- Type: Private
- Industry: Media
- Founded: 1993
- Founder: Soetikno Soedarjo; Adiguna Sutowo; Dian M. Soedarjo
- Headquarters: Jakarta, Indonesia
- Key people: Herwinto Dewantara Sutowo (Chairman); Maulana Indraguna Sutowo (CEO)
- Owners: Maulana Indraguna Sutowo (85%); Soetikno Soedarjo|Soedarjo sisters (15%)
- Website: www.mra.co.id

Mugi Rekso Abadi (MRA) is an Indonesian holding company with units in magazine publishing, luxury retail brands, hotels and restaurants, radio stations, and automotive companies. Founded in 1993, MRA Group is based in Jakarta.

== History and founders ==
In 1993, MRA was founded by Soetikno Soedarjo, Adiguna Sutowo and Soetikno's then-wife Dian Muljadi Soedarjo (the daughter of pharmaceuticals tycoon Kartini Muljadi). The name Mugi Rekso Abadi is Javanese for "I hope it lasts forever". MRA was pre-dated by the establishment of Hard Rock Cafe Jakarta, which Adiguna and Soetikno had launched with an investment of 8 billion rupiah in 1992. The idea for Hard Rock Cafe Jakarta came from a conversation between Adiguna, Soetikno and Meuthia Kasim. Once MRA was established as a holding company, Soetikno later invested in a broadcast media division, creating Hard Rock FM Jakarta, followed by Hard Rock FM Bandung, and Hard Rock Radio Bali, i-Radio, MTV Radio, O Channel, and IP Entertainment. MRA also expanded into lifestyle magazines, imported luxury cars and restaurants.

MRA's website states: "Leading the drive at MRA are energetic, dedicated executives, exemplified by Adiguna Sutowo & Soetikno Soedarjo. They embody the character of an excellent young management team: a sense of intelligent restlessness, they are on the move and look forward to new products, new concepts and fresh horizons." Adiguna was in 2005 sentenced to seven years in jail for murdering a waiter at Jakarta Hilton International hotel, and Soetikno was in 2020 sentenced to six years in jail for bribery.

In January 2017, Adiguna's son, Maulana Indraguna Sutowo, was appointed chief executive officer to replace Soetikno, who had been named a corruption suspect. The three daughters of co-founders Soetikno Soedarjo and Dian Muljadi - Putri, Mita and Dita Soedarjo - all hold senior positions in MRA Group.

== Divisions ==
MRA has six divisions: Print Media, Broadcast Media, Retail & Lifestyle, Food & Beverage, Automotive, Hotel & Property.

== Print media ==
Soetikno Soedarjo launched an Indonesian version of Cosmopolitan Magazine in August 1997. Indonesian versions of other international lifestyle magazines followed, although several ceased their print editions in 2017.

=== Current magazines ===
- Cosmopolitan Indonesia
- Harper's Bazaar Indonesia (since January 2000)
- Mother & Beyond
- CASA Indonesia (published since 2008 as Bravacasa, later renamed CASA)
- Her World Indonesia

=== Defunct magazines ===
- Bali & Beyond (print edition from 1998 to 2018)
- FHM Indonesia (print edition from 2003 to December 2017)
- Cosmo Girl Indonesia (final print edition October 2017)
- Autocar Indonesia (final print edition October 2017)
- Esquire Indonesia (print edition from March 2007 to December 2017)
- Target Car (final print edition 2017)
- Men's Fitness (final print edition June 2017)
- Maxim Indonesia (from 2005 to August 2017)
- Hello! Indonesia (final print edition March 2016)
- Trax (final print edition February 2016)
- Good Housekeeping Indonesia (final print edition December 2015)
- HairIdeas (final print edition October 2013)
- Amica Indonesia (from September 2008 to June 2013)
- Spice! (printed from 2004 to September 2011)

MRA Group had a magazine distribution unit within the circulation department of PT Higina Alhadin, the publisher of Cosmopolitan Indonesia. It functioned to distribute publications owned by MRA Group. In 2003, the circulation department became a limited corporation called PT Citra Distribusi Mandiri (CDM), which distributed publications owned by MRA and other publishers.

== Broadcast media ==
MRA Group's first media unit was Hard Rock FM, established in 1996. The success of Hard Rock FM led to the creation of I-Radio and TRAX FM, followed by Cosmopolitan FM in 2002.

MRA Group's radio station subsidiaries include:

- PT Surya Swara Mediatama (MRA Media EMD)
- PT Radio Antar Nusa Djaja (The Rockin' Life Jakarta)
- PT Radio Baturiti Menaraswara (The Rockin' Life Bali)
- PT Radio Suara Kedjajaan (101.4 MTV SKY Jakarta)
- PT Radio Mustika Abadi (iSwara Jakarta)
- PT Radio Muara Abdi Nusa (90.4 Cosmopolitan FM Jakarta)
- PT Media Network Indonesia (MNI)
- PT Radio Ekacita Swara Buana (The Rockin' Life Bandung)
- PT Harini Jaya Mandiri (iSwara Surabaya)

== Retail and lifestyle ==
=== Current brands ===
- Bulgari (Italian jewelry chain, established in Indonesia in 1995 under PT Mogems Putri International)
- Bang & Olufsen (electronics chain, brought to Indonesia under PT Sarana Elektrindo Utama in July 2001)

Putri Soedarjo, the eldest daughter of Soetikno Soedarjo and Dian Muljadi, is head of retail for Bulgari and Bang & Olufsen.

=== Previous brands ===
- Paris Hilton Handbags & Accessories (launched under PT Pesona Harumi, now defunct)
- Ghiboo (lifestyle web portal launched in 2013, now defunct)

== Food and beverage ==
MRA Group's first enterprise was Hard Rock Cafe Jakarta. It was originally located in Sarinah shopping center. In July 2004, it relocated to Plaza Indonesia’s Entertainment X'nter. In August 2013, it moved to Pacific Place mall in the Sudirman City Business District. As of 2020, MRA Group runs the following restaurants:

- Hard Rock Cafe Jakarta
- Hard Rock Cafe Bali
- Lalla Jakarta
- Cloud Lounge & Dining (rooftop bar in The Plaza Office Tower, Jakarta, since 2014)
- RTL (Regional Tasting Lounge, a restaurant in Capital Place on Jakarta's Jalan Gatot Subroto)

MRA also has a subsidiary that runs Indonesian outlets of Häagen Dazs. The unit has since 2015 been run by Dita Soedarjo, the youngest daughter of Soetikno Soedarjo and Dian Muljadi.

== Automotive ==
MRA has brought some of world's top luxury car brands to Indonesia, but high government taxes on luxury vehicles and an unfavorable exchange rate have resulted in the importing licenses for some brands not being renewed.

=== Current brands ===
- Ferrari: Ferrari Jakarta (PT Citra Langgeng Otomotif) was established in 2001 and is the official distributor for Ferrari in Indonesia.

=== Previous brands ===
- Harley Davidson: PT Mabua Harley-Davidson was founded on 13 June 1997 as part of MRA. The sole dealer of Harley-Davidson motorcycles in Indonesia, its agency license expired on 31 December 2015 and was not renewed because of the weakening of the rupiah and government tax increases.
- Maserati: Maserati was introduced to Indonesia in 2001, initially under the same company as Ferrari. From 2012, Maserati Indonesia was run by MRA subsidiary PT Tiara Cahaya Otomotif as importer and PT Citra Gemilang Otomotif as authorized dealer. In 2014, Maserati appointed PT Auto Trisula Indonesia as its new partner for Indonesia.
- Abarth: Since 2013, the Abarth sales license in Indonesia was held by PT Parama Unggul Automotive and MRA Group subsidiary PT Genta Surya Automotive (GSO). The license expired in January 2016 and was not renewed, but the Abarth showroom on Jalan Fatmawati in South Jakarta continued to offer services.

== Hotel & Property ==
- Bulgari Hotel & Resort (luxury cliff-top resort in Uluwatu, Bali)
