= Dian Sastrowardoyo =

Indonesian model and actress (born 1982)

- Sastro in 2026
- Born: Dian Paramita Sastrowardoyo; 16 March 1982 (age 44); Jakarta, Indonesia
- Other name: Dian Sastro
- Education: University of Indonesia (Bachelor's degree and MA)
- Occupations: Actress; model
- Years active: 1989–present
- Spouse: Maulana Indraguna Sutowo (m. 2010)
- Children: 2
- Relatives: Soenario Sastrowardoyo (great uncle); Adiguna Sutowo (father-in-law)
- Awards: Citra Award for Best Actress in lead role

Dian Paramita Sastrowardoyo (born 16 March 1982), better known as Dian Sastro, is an Indonesian actress and model. She is known for her lead role as Cinta in the Indonesian 2001 film Ada Apa Dengan Cinta?

== Early life and education ==
Sastro was born on 16 March 1982 in Jakarta, Indonesia, to Ariawan Sastrowardoyo (1955–1995), an artist, and Dewi Parwati Sastrowardoyo (née Setyorini), a university lecturer. Sastro was born as a Christian and raised as a Roman Catholic but later converted to Islam. Her paternal grandfather, Dr. Sumarsono Sastrowardoyo (1922–2008), was a physician, surgeon, and book author. Her uncle, Dr. Aswin Wisaksono Sastrowardoyo (b. 1957), is a musician turned physician. She is also the grandniece of both Sunario (1902–1997), Indonesia's Minister of Foreign Affairs from 1953 to 1956; Dra. Sukanti Suryochondro (1915–2004), a former instructor in women's studies at the University of Indonesia; and Subagio Sastrowardoyo (1924–1995), a noted poet and literary critic. Her paternal great-grandfather, Sutejo Sastrowardoyo (1878–1967), traced the family's ancestry back to the 15th century Javanese. Sastro's family name is derived from sastra (Sanskrit, "writings") and wardaya ("heart", hence both: "writings of the heart").

She attended junior high school at the SMP Vincentius Otista Jakarta and high school at the SMA Tarakanita 1. Then, she continued her higher studies at the University of Indonesia where she studied law briefly before moving to the Faculty of Literature, where she obtained her bachelor's degree in philosophy in July 2007. She did her post-graduate degree at the School of Economics at the same institution, where she studied Finance Management as her major and earned a Master's in Management degree. She graduated cum laude in August 2014.

== Career ==
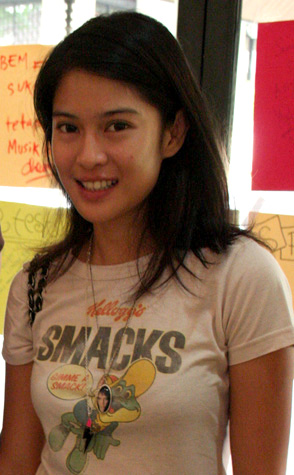
Sastro in 2007

Sastro began her modelling career in 1996 as the cover girl of Gadis, a popular teen magazine in Indonesia after she won the teen beauty pageant Gadis Sampul at the age of 14. She went on to secure a main role in Pasir Berbisik as Daya, which was a critical success and won her many awards, including the Best Actress award in the Deauville Asian Film Festival. She rose to prominence with her starring role as Cinta in the cult classic romance 2002 movie Ada Apa dengan Cinta?, which was a box office hit not only in Indonesia, but also in Malaysia a year later in January 2003. From the role, she won the Citra Award for Best Actress. Since then, she has established herself as one of Indonesia's most bankable actresses, starring in films such as Banyu Biru, Ungu Violet, and Belahan Jiwa, as well as international films such as the Malaysian production Puteri Gunung Ledang.

Other television appearances include playing Raya in Dunia Tanpa Koma and a brief stint as the host of the television game show Kuis Super Milyarder 3 Milyar which is the spin-off second season in Indonesian version of Who Wants to Be a Millionaire?. The show aired on ANTV. Apart from her acting career, she has been the face model of L'Oréal Paris Indonesia since 2010.

Sastro is the goodwill ambassador for the MTV EXIT youth campaign, a multimedia initiative produced by MTV EXIT Foundation to raise awareness and increase prevention of human trafficking and modern slavery through live events, video content, and youth engagement. She hosted a special programme for the campaign in 2012 titled Enslaved, produced for thirteen Asian countries.

In 2016, she reprised her role as the titular character in Ada Apa Dengan Cinta? 2, the sequel to Ada Apa dengan Cinta? alongside actor Nicholas Saputra.

In 2016, Sastro starred as Indonesia's national heroine in the biographical drama movie Kartini. In 2018, Dian starred in Aruna dan Lidahnya (Aruna and Her Palate), a film based on the Laksmi Pamuntjak written book novel of the same name.

In 2020, she starred in the comedy film Crazy Awesome Teachers and it released directly on Netflix.

In 2023, Sastro starred in Kamila Andini and Ifa Isfansyah's directed Netflix series Cigarette Girl as Jeng Yah co-starring with Ario Bayu, Putri Marino, Sha Ine Febriyanti, Rukman Rosadi and Tutie Kirana.

== Personal life ==
Sastro married businessman Maulana Indraguna Sutowo, the son of business tycoon Adiguna Sutowo, on 18 May 2010. The couple have two children: Shailendra Naryama Sastraguna Sutowo (born 17 July 2011) and Ishana Ariandra Nariratana Sutowo (born 7 June 2013).

== Filmography ==
=== Films ===
Year	Title	Role	Notes
2000	Bintang Jatuh	Donna	
2001	Whispering Sands	Daya	Won – Deauville Asian Film Festival; Won – Singapore International Film Festival
2001	Ada Apa dengan Cinta?	Cinta	Won – 2002 Indonesian Film Festival for Best Actress in a leading role
2004	Arisan!	Woman in Gallery	Cameo appearance
2005	Puteri Gunung Ledang	Medicine Seller's Daughter	Cameo appearance
2005	Banyu Biru	Sula	
2005	Ungu Violet	Kalin	
2006	Belahan Jiwa	Cempaka	
2008	3 Doa 3 Cinta	Dona Satelit	
2009	Drupadi	Drupadi	
2014	7 Hari 24 Jam	Tania Wulandary	
2016	Ada Apa Dengan Cinta? 2	Cinta	
2016	Kartini	Raden Adjeng Kartini	
2018	Aruna & Her Palate	Aruna	Nominated – 2018 Indonesian Film Festival for Best Actress in a leading role
2018	The Night Comes For Us	Alma	
2018	Milly & Mamet	Cinta	
2020	Crazy Awesome Teachers	Nirmala	
2022	Sri Asih	The Fire Goddess	Cameo
2025	The Fox King	Lara	
2026	The Sea Speaks His Name	Kasih Kinanti	

=== Television ===
Year	Title	Role	Notes
2006	Dunia Tanpa Koma	Raya	Main role; 14 episodes
2006	Panasonic Cinema	Herself (host)	TV special
2012	Enslaved: An MTV EXIT Special	Herself (host)	TV special
2015	The East	Director	Episodes: "Pilot"
2023	Cigarette Girl	Dasiyah	Netflix TV series
2024	Ratu Adil	Lasja Soeryo	Vidio

=== Endorsements ===
- L'Oréal
- LUX
- Samsung Corby
- NATUR-E
- Panasonic
- Mentari Indosat
- Sunsilk
- Torabika Creamy Latte
- Prenagen
- Vitalong C
- LINE

=== Music video appearances ===
- Xirus Indonesia – "Yang Terdalam" (2010)
- Glenn Fredly – "Hitam Putih" (2009)
- Keyla – "Tempat Berbeda" (2008)
- Peterpan – "Menghapus Jejakmu" (2007)
- T-Five – "Yang Terindah" (2002)
- Dewa – "Sayap-sayap Patah" (2001)
- Shelomita – "Langkah" (2000)
- Katon Bagaskara – "Cinta Selembut Awan" (2000)
- Sheila on 7 – "J.A.P" (1999)
- Sheila on 7 – "Anugerah Terindah" (1999)
- The Fly – "Air Mata Sunyi" (1999)
- KLA Project – "Gerimis" (1996)
- PADI – “ Menanti Sebuah Jawaban" (2005)
- DISKORIA – "Serenata Jiwa Lara" (2020)
- Too Phat — Alhamdulillah (2006)

== Awards and nominations ==
Year	Award	Category	Recipients	Result
2002	Deauville Asian Film Festival	Best Actress	Pasir Berbisik	Won
2002	Singapore International Film Festival	Best Actress	Pasir Berbisik	Won
2002	Indonesian Film Festival	Citra Award for Best Leading Actress	Ada Apa dengan Cinta?	Won
2002	SCTV Award	Most Favorite Actress	Ada Apa dengan Cinta?	Won
2003	Hawaii International Film Festival	Best Actress	Ada Apa dengan Cinta?	Won
2003	Malaysian Film Festival	Best Actress	Ada Apa dengan Cinta?	Won
2003	Festival Film Bandung	Best Actress	Ada Apa dengan Cinta?	Won
2005	MTV Indonesia Movie Awards	Most Favorite Actress	Ungu Violet	Won
2005	MTV Asia Movie Awards in Singapore	Most Favorite Actress	Ungu Violet	Won
2005	Asia Pacific Film Festival	Most Promising Actress	Banyu Biru	Won
2009	Pusan International Film Festival	Silver Award for Leading Female Performance	3 Doa 3 Cinta	Won
2009	Bali International Film Festival	Best Supporting Actress	3 Doa 3 Cinta	Won
2009	ELLE Film Magazine USA Award	Actress of The Year	3 Doa 3 Cinta	Won
2010	USA Magazine Indonesia Award	Most Favorite Actress	Drupadi	Won
2015	Maya Award	Best Actress in a Leading Role	7/24	Nominated
2017	Indonesian Film Festival	Citra Award for Best Leading Actress	Kartini	Nominated
2018	Indonesian Film Festival	Citra Award for Best Leading Actress	Aruna dan Lidahnya	Nominated
2018	Maya Award	Best Actress in a Leading Role	Aruna dan Lidahnya	Nominated
