= Djohar Arifin Husin =

Indonesian sports executive (born 1950)

Prof. Dr. Ir. H. Djohar Arifin
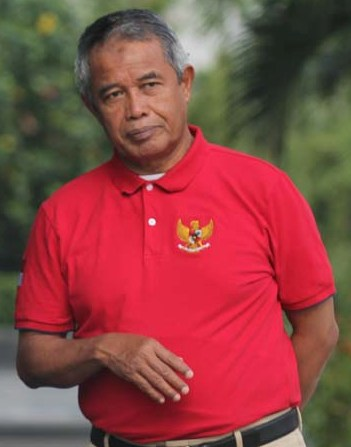

16th Chair of the Football Association of Indonesia
- In office 9 July 2011 – 18 April 2015
- Preceded by: Nurdin Halid
- Succeeded by: La Nyalla Mattalitti

Personal details
- Born: Djohar Arifin Husin; 13 September 1950 (age 76) Tanjung Pura, Langkat, North Sumatra, Indonesia
- Party: Gerindra
- Spouse: Marina Hutabarat
- Children: 4
- Education: University of North Sumatra; Indonesia Open University; University of Malaya

Djohar Arifin Husin (born 13 September 1950) is a former chairman of the Football Association of Indonesia (PSSI) from 2011 to 2015, replacing former corruption-convict Nurdin Halid.

He was also a General Secretary of National Sports Committee of Indonesia (KONI), under the leadership of Agum Gumelar and Regional Board of PSSI North Sumatra. He was an active professor in the Islamic University of North Sumatra and expert staff in the Ministry of Youth and Sports.

In his youth, he was also a footballer and football referee in the national level.

He was chosen as chairman of PSSI in the extraordinary congress of PSSI on 9 July 2011 in Surakarta.

== Footballing career ==
The young Djohar was a player for PSL Langkat in the period from 1968 to 1969. His career then continued to the higher level in the country, PSMS Medan from 1973 to 1976.

After his retirement, he became a football referee, both for national and international from 1976 to 1987. He was also a match inspector for the national football.

In 2000, he worked with PSSI Branch North Sumatra Region. In 2003, he became the general secretary of the KONI.

In 2011, Djohar was chosen to become the chairman of PSSI as a result of the extraordinary congress of PSSI in Surakarta.

His tenure in PSSI was marred by denunciation by the end of 2011, as a new league called IPL (Indonesian Premier League) was formed to replace ISL (Indonesia Super League) made by the previous regime as the top league. It was known as Indonesian football dualism where two different leagues competed as top leagues and did not recognize each other. The rebellious illegal football association named Indonesian Football Savior Committee (KPSI), led by La Nyalla Mattalitti and packed with most people for the previous regime successfully threatened most national team players, who played in the now KPSI-run ISL, to stay away from the FIFA-sanctioned national team. They even made their own "national team", playing in some friendly matches against amateur sides in Australia. The team was packed with those ISL players, namely Cristian Gonzáles, Firman Utina, and former national captain Ponaryo Astaman, and was coached by former national coach Alfred Riedl.

This forced PSSI to replace all the senior players in the national team with players from IPL. PSSI sent the newly made national team to Riffa to face Bahrain national football team for 2014 World Cup qualifier on 29 February 2012 only to be defeated 0–10. It is the worst defeat for Indonesia national football team since the team's first international appearance in 1934.

The same reason forced the team to be filled by mostly non-ISL players during the 2012 AFF Championship. Only one ISL player accepted the national team call-up. He was former national captain Bambang Pamungkas, who wanted to mark this tournament as his last for the national team. Despite being eliminated in the group stage and suffered their worst-ever record in the AFF Championship — particularly due to a draw against Laos, which usually get beaten by Indonesia — they successfully record their first AFF Championship victory against Singapore with one goal from Andik Vermansyah. Singapore would gone on to win their fourth AFF Championship title later in the tournament.

== Political career ==
Djohar currently runs for a seat in the House of Representatives as a candidate in North Sumatra II zone with main opposition party Gerindra.

Sporting positions
Preceded by Nurdin Halid	President of PSSI; 2011–2015	Succeeded by La Nyalla Mattalitti
