= Football Association of Indonesia =

Football governing body

AFC
- Full name: Persatuan Sepak Bola Seluruh Indonesia
- Short name: PSSI
- Founded: 19 April 1930; 96 years ago
- Headquarters: GBK Arena, Jakarta
- FIFA affiliation: 1952; 74 years ago
- AFC affiliation: 1954; 72 years ago
- AFF affiliation: 1984; 42 years ago
- Chairman: Erick Thohir
- Vice-Chairmen: Zainudin Amali; Ratu Tisha
- General Secretary: Yunus Nusi
- Website: www.pssi.org

The Football Association of All Indonesia (Indonesian: Persatuan Sepakbola Seluruh Indonesia, lit. 'All-Indonesian Football Association'; abbreviated as PSSI) is the governing body of football in Indonesia. It was founded on 19 April 1930. The PSSI joined FIFA in 1952 and the Asian Football Confederation in 1954.

== History ==
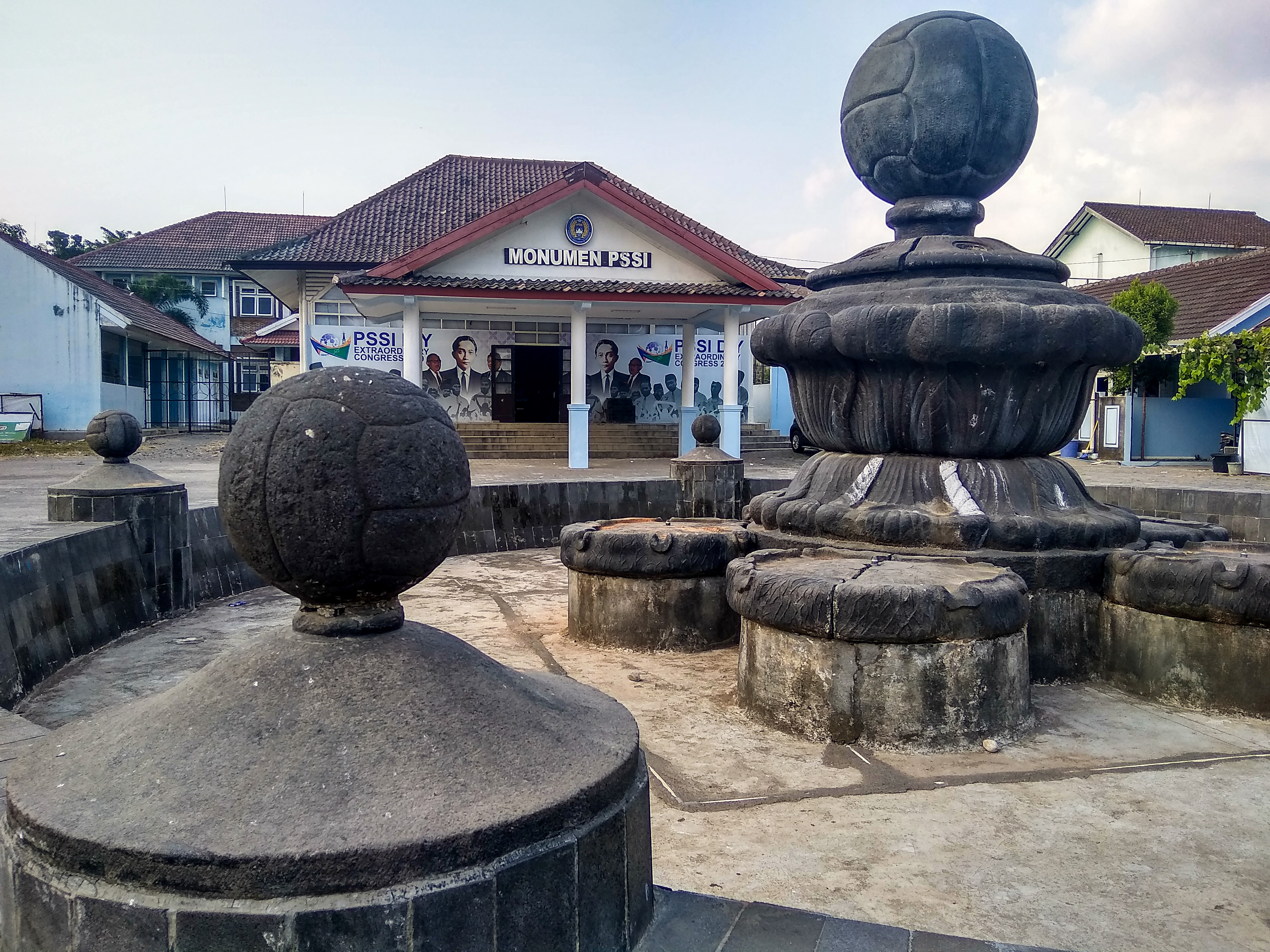
PSSI Monument/PSIM Football Building in Yogyakarta near Mandala Krida Stadium, the birthplace of PSSI.

=== Early history ===
PSSI was established by Soeratin Sosrosoegondo, who graduated in civil engineering from a technical university in Germany in 1927 and returned to Indonesia in 1928. He became the first Indonesian to work at his company, a Dutch enterprise in Yogyakarta. He later resigned from the company and became more active in the revolutionary movement.

To accomplish his mission, Soeratin held many meetings with Indonesian professional football players, mostly through personal contacts because they wanted to avoid the Dutch police. Later, at a meeting that was held in Jakarta with Soeratin, the head of Voetbalbond Indonesische Jakarta (VIJ), and other players, the group decided to establish a national football organisation. On 19 April 1930, almost all non-national organisations, such as VIJ (Jakarta), BIVB (Bandung), PSM (Yogyakarta), IVBM (Magelang), VVB (Surakarta), MVB (Madiun), and SIVB (Surabaya) gathered at the final meeting and established Persatoean Sepak Raga Seloeroeh Indonesia (Football Association of Indonesia or PSSI) with Soeratin as the first leader.

In PSSI's earlier years, football was used to resist the Dutch control of the colonies by gathering all the footballers. In 1936, when PSSI became stronger, NIVB was changed to Nederlandsh Indische Voetbal Unie (NIVU, lit. 'Football Union of Dutch East Indies') and cooperation with the Dutch began. In 1938, with "Dutch East Indies national football team" as their name, NIVU sent their team to the 1938 FIFA World Cup at France. At the time, most of the players came from NIVU instead of PSSI, and there were nine players of Chinese origin. As a result, Soeratin expressed his protest since he wanted a match between NIVU and PSSI before the FIFA World Cup. In addition, he was also disgraced because the flag that was used at the World Cup matches involving the Dutch East Indies was the Dutch flag. Soeratin then cancelled the agreement with NIVU at the PSSI congress in 1939 in Surakarta.

=== Japanese occupation ===
When the Japanese occupied the Dutch East Indies, the PSSI became inactive since Japan classified it as a Taiikukai (体育会) (Japanese Sport Association).

== Executives ==
=== List of chairmen ===
No.	Chair	Took office	Left office	Notes
1	Soeratin Sosrosoegondo	1930	1940	Before Indonesia's independence
2	Artono Martosoewignyo	1940	1950	Indonesian National Revolution
3	Maladi	1950	1960	
4	Abdul Wahab Djojohadikusumo	1960	1964	
5	Maulwi Saelan	1964	1967	
6	Kosasih Poerwanegara	1967	1975	
7	Bardosono	1975	1977	
—	Moehono	1977	1977	ad interim
8	Ali Sadikin	1977	1981	
9	Sjarnoebi Said	1981	1983	
10	Kardono	1983	1991	
11	Azwar Anas	1991	1999	
12	Agum Gumelar	1999	2003	
13	Nurdin Halid	2003	1 April 2011	
—	Agum Gumelar	1 April 2011	9 July 2011	ad interim (Note: Chairman of the Normalization Committee)
14	Djohar Arifin Husin	9 July 2011	18 April 2015	
15	La Nyalla Mattalitti	18 April 2015	3 August 2016	
—	Hinca Panjaitan	3 August 2016	10 November 2016	ad interim
16	Edy Rahmayadi	10 November 2016	20 January 2019	
—	Joko Driyono	20 January 2019	2 May 2019	ad interim
—	Iwan Budianto	2 May 2019	2 November 2019	ad interim
17	Mochamad Iriawan	2 November 2019	16 February 2023	
18	Erick Thohir	16 February 2023	Incumbent	

=== Executive board ===
Name	Position	Source
Erick Thohir	Chairman	
Zainudin Amali; Ratu Tisha	Vice-Chairman	
Ahmad Riyadh; Arya Sinulingga; Eko Setyawan; Endri Erawan; Hasnuryadi Sulaiman; Juni Rachman; Khairul Anwar; Muhammad Sungkar; Pieter Tanuri; Rudi Yulianto; Sumardji; Vivin Cahyani	Executive Committee members	

== Competition structure ==
PSSI has 4 boards in its structure, namely: I-League which is responsible for Super League, Championship, and Liga Nusantara then the PSSI provincial association of Liga 4, the Board for National Team (BTN) for national teams and the Board for Futsal National Team (BFN) for national futsal teams.

== PSSI competitions ==
PSSI is made up of four levels of national football leagues, which are:

- Super League
- Championship
- Liga Nusantara
- Liga 4
- Piala Indonesia, as the domestic cups to compete clubs from all divisions level
- Piala Presiden, as pre-season tournament
- I-League Cup, as the domestic league cups to compete clubs from Super League and Championship

There are other football competitions on national level, namely the:

- Indonesia Women's League
- Pertiwi Cup
- Soeratin Cup
- Elite Pro Academy

Furthermore, each regional level (and lower) football associations in the country has its own annual amateur football competition structure involving local clubs.

== National teams ==
Currently, Indonesia has the following football national teams:

Men's

- Indonesia national football team
- Indonesia national under-23 football team
- Indonesia national under-20 football team
- Indonesia national under-17 football team
- Indonesia national under-15 football team

Women's

- Indonesia women's national football team
- Indonesia women's national under-20 football team
- Indonesia women's national under-17 football team
- Indonesia women's national under-15 football team

Men's Futsal

- Indonesia national futsal team
- Indonesia national under-20 futsal team
- Indonesia national under-17 futsal team

Women's Futsal

- Indonesia women's national futsal team

Men's Beach Soccer

- Indonesia national beach soccer team

== Controversies and critics ==
=== Nurdin Halid legal cases ===
In 2007, former chairman of PSSI Nurdin Halid was sentenced to prison as a result of his legal cases. Although he was urged to resign his position, he was able to resist with the help of one of the political party leaders in the country. FIFA conducted an inspection into the claims but did not continue past this phase. The case was never investigated again.

=== Bribery allegation ===
In January 2011, someone named "Eli Cohen" had sent an e-mail to the President of Indonesia and several other Indonesian leaders indicating that the officers of PSSI had been involved in bribery for the 2010 AFF Cup final. He wrote that the officers gained billions of rupiah from the bet to prepare the campaign in the next PSSI congress. This case is under investigation.

=== Normalisation Committee and selection of new chairman ===
On 1 April 2011, FIFA Emergency Committee met and announced that, on 4 April, control of the PSSI would pass to a normalisation committee made up of personalities in Indonesian football to oversee presidential elections by 21 May. It also barred Halid, George Toisutta (the Indonesia Armed Forces general), Arifin Panigoro (founder of Liga Primer Indonesia) and Nirwan Bakrie (Halid's vice-president, and brother of Aburizal Bakrie) from contending for the presidency seat.

FIFA also rescinded the power of the current PSSI executive committee after FIFA's emergencies committee decreed it was "not in control of football in Indonesia" and had lost "all credibility." In a statement released on 4 April 2011, FIFA said that the current PSSI leadership's lack of control over Indonesian football was evidenced by "the failure to gain control of the run-away league (LPI) set up without the involvement of PSSI or by the fact it could not organise a congress whose sole goals were to adopt an electoral code and elect an electoral commission." It said that its emergency committee had concluded that the PSSI leadership "had lost all credibility" and was no longer "in a position anymore to lead the process to solve the current crisis."

The Normalisation Committee, made up of personalities in Indonesian football who are not seeking electoral office or a position on an electoral commission, led by famous public figure and former PSSI chairman, Agum Gumelar, is to take over running of Indonesian football until new leadership is elected by 21 May.

On 9 July 2011, Djohar Arifin Husin was elected chairman of the PSSI from 2011 to 2015 through an Extraordinary Congress of the PSSI held in 2011. Djohar was elected after defeating the other candidate, Agusman Effendi. His vice-chairman was Farid Rahman.

=== Row with Indonesian Government and Suspension of PSSI ===
On 18 April 2015, PSSI was suspended by Ministry of Sports and Youth. PSSI did not comply with the government policy after disobeying three warning letters that were sent by the ministry. Based on that, the Youth and Sports Minister provided administrative sanctions by not recognising all sports activities carried out by the PSSI. The decision applied since the letter was assigned. The warning letters were sent because of PSSI's decision to halt Indonesia Super League amidst the dispute between PSSI and government's Indonesian Professional Sports Agency (BOPI) over the eligibility of Arema Cronus and Persebaya Surabaya to play in the league. FIFA had threatened the country with a ban, but BOPI insisted that FIFA should understand that besides FIFA regulation, there are also laws that are applied and must be complied by all national football related parties as part of the Indonesian big family, so FIFA's warning to ban Indonesia is thought as an insult to the country's sovereignty. President of Indonesia, Joko Widodo had supported the Sport Minister decision not to revoke the suspension as the President believed that there should be no problem for Indonesia to be absent from international competitions if the purpose is to improve the national football. According to the President, the improvement should be started by revamping the organisations.

FIFA had decided to suspend the PSSI during the FIFA Executive Committee meeting on Saturday, 30 May 2015, in Zurich, Switzerland. The Executive decided to suspend the PSSI with immediate effect and until the PSSI would be able to comply with its obligations under arts. 13 and 17 of the FIFA Statutes. The decision meant Indonesian sides would no longer be able to take part in world football, and came less than two weeks before the country was due to begin qualifying matches for the 2018 World Cup. However, the national team would still be able to participate in the football tournament at the 2015 Southeast Asian Games, which was just getting under way.

Finally, Indonesia State Minister for Youth and Sports Affairs lifted their suspension of the PSSI per 10 May 2016. And FIFA lifted their suspension at FIFA Congress, 12–13 May 2016 in Mexico.

=== National team training schedule miscommunication ===
On 26 May 2022, national team's head coach, Shin Tae-yong stated that they had canceled the official training because Gelora Bung Karno Madya Stadium as the venue of the training had not yet been booked. "The reason is bit embarrassing. We wanted to exercises on the field after weight training, but earlier, there was information that the field was being used. It had not been "booked". So we decided to replace the training with jogging," said Shin Tae-yong. The team replaced the training with jogging around Gelora Bung Karno Stadium. Yunus Nusi as the PSSI exco announced to media that the venue is already booked but it is different with what Shin Tae-yong understood. The training was held due to friendly match on FIFA matchday schedule against Bangladesh on 1 June 2022.

== See also ==
- Indonesian football league system
