= Agum Gumelar =

Indonesian general and politician (born 1945)

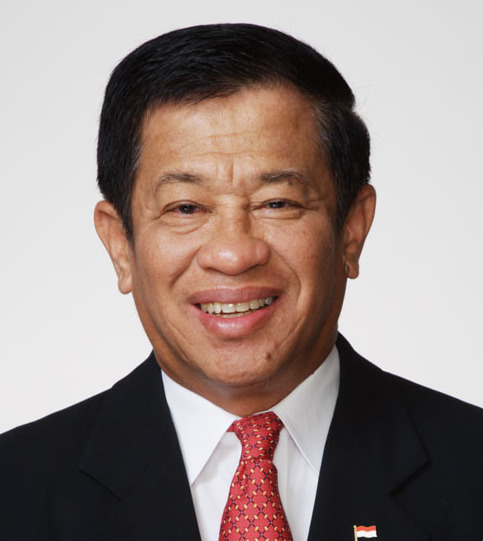
- Agum Gumelar as Member of the Presidential Advisory Council, 2018

Member of the Presidential Advisory Council
- In office 18 January 2018 – 20 October 2019
- President: Joko Widodo
- Preceded by: Hasyim Muzadi

9th Coordinating Minister for Political, Legal, and Security Affairs
- In office 1 June 2001 – 23 July 2001
- President: Abdurrahman Wahid
- Preceded by: Susilo Bambang Yudhoyono
- Succeeded by: Susilo Bambang Yudhoyono

25th Minister of Transportation
- In office 10 August 2001 – 20 October 2004
- President: Megawati Sukarnoputri
- Preceded by: Budy Mulyawan
- Succeeded by: Hatta Rajasa
- In office 26 October 1999 – 10 July 2001
- President: Abdurrahman Wahid
- Preceded by: Giri Suseno Harihardjono
- Succeeded by: Budy Mulyawan

22nd Minister of Defense
- In office 20 July 2001 – 23 July 2001
- President: Abdurrahman Wahid
- Preceded by: Mahfud MD
- Succeeded by: Matori Abdul Jalil

Personal details
- Born: 17 December 1945 (age 80) Tasikmalaya, West Java, Indonesia
- Party: Golkar
- Spouse: Linda Amalia Sari
- Children: Khaseli; Ami
- Education: Indonesian Military Academy Padjadjaran University American World University

Military service
- Allegiance: Indonesia
- Branch/service: Indonesian Army
- Years of service: 1968–2000
- Rank: General (honorary)
- Unit: Infantry (Kopassus)
- Commands: Kopassus
- Battles/wars: Operation Lotus; Insurgency in Aceh; Papua conflict

Agum Gumelar (born 17 December 1945) is a politician and former general of the Indonesian National Armed Forces. He is a former minister, having held several positions, a former chairman of Indonesian Football Association and National Sports Committee of Indonesia. He is an alumnus of the National Military Academy in Magelang, Central Java and Medical Faculty of Padjadjaran University in Bandung, West Java. In 1998, he received a master's degree from Indonesian Global Management Institute, a diploma mill that was banned in 2005.

== Family ==
Agum is married to Linda Amaliasari and has 2 children, Haris Khaseli Gumelar and Ami Dianti Gumelar.

== Military career ==
Agum entered the Indonesian Military Academy in Magelang, Central Java in 1969. In 1973, he was appointed staff in the Operational Command for the Restoration of Security and Order.
In late 1987, Agum was promoted to Vice Intelligence Assistance of Special Force Command (Kopassus) until 1990. In 1991, he was transferred to Vice Intelligence of Jakarta military area command. In 1992 Agum was promoted to Danrem 042/Garuda Hitam in Lampung.

In 1993, he was promoted as Director A of the Strategic Intelligence Board of Indonesian National Armed Forces and also promoted to Commander of Kopassus. In 1994, he was promoted to the position of Chief of Staff of the Bukit Barisan Military Area Command until 1996 when he was again transferred and promoted as Chief of the Wirabuana Military Area Command until 1998. By 1998 he was promoted as Governor of National Resilience Institute, until 1999.

== Political career ==
=== Wahid Presidency ===
When Abdurrahman Wahid became president in 1999, Agum was appointed Minister of Transportation. In July 2001 he was moved to the position of Minister of Defense and Coordinating Minister of Politics, Social and Security during the fourth Wahid government cabinet reshuffle.

=== Megawati Presidency ===
When Wahid was impeached by the People's Consultative Assembly and Megawati Sukarnoputri was appointed president, Agum was appointed Minister of Transport, a position he held in the Mutual Assistance Cabinet until 2004.

=== Widodo Presidency ===
In January 2018, Agum was appointed a member of the Presidential Advisory Council in a minor reshuffle, replacing Hasyim Muzadi who died in 2017.

== 2004 Indonesian Presidential Election ==
During the first direct presidential elections in Indonesia in 2004, Agum was selected as a vice presidential candidate. He joined the incumbent vice president Hamzah Haz as a running mate. The Hamzah – Agum team was supported by the United Development Party.
In the first round of the election (July 5, 2004), the Hamzah – Agum team received relatively low support (only 3.5 million votes). These results put the duo into fifth place on in the 2004 Indonesian presidential elections behind SBY – Jusuf Kalla, Megawati Sukarnoputri – Hasyim Muzadi, Wiranto – Solahuddin Wahid and Amien Rais – Siswono Yudohusodo. The Hamzah – Agum team was therefore eliminated and was not eligible to take place in second round of the election held several months later.

== 2008 West Java Gubernatorial Election ==
In 2008 the West Java province held the first direct gubernatorial election. Agum took part in the competition, supported by a coalition of Indonesian Democratic Party - Struggle and United Development Party, with his running mate, the incumbent vice governor Nu'man Abdul Hakim.
Agum was unsuccessful with the Agum – Nu'man duo taking second place behind Ahmad Heryawan – Yusuf Macan Effendie team from coalition of the Prosperous Justice Party and National Mandate Party.

== Notes ==
Political offices
| Preceded by Budy Mulyawan | Minister of Transportation of Indonesia; 2001–2004 | Succeeded by Hatta Rajasa |
| Preceded by Susilo Bambang Yudhoyono | Coordinating Minister for Politic, Social and Security of Indonesia; 2001 | Succeeded by Susilo Bambang Yudhoyono |
| Preceded by Mohammad Mahfud | Minister of Defense; 2001 | Succeeded by Matori Abdul Jalil |
| Preceded by Giri Suseno Harihardjono | Minister of Transportation of Indonesia; 1999–2001 | Succeeded by Budy Mulyawan |
Sporting positions
| Preceded by Nurdin Halid | Chairman ad interim Indonesian Football Association; 2011 | Succeeded by Djohar Arifin Husin |
| Preceded by Wismoyo Arismunandar | Chairman of National Sports Committee of Indonesia; 2003–2007 | Succeeded by Rita Subowo |
| Preceded by Azwar Anas | Chairman of Indonesian Football Association; 1999–2003 | Succeeded by Nurdin Halid |
