= Whispering Sands =

2001 film

- DVD cover.
- Directed by: Nan Triveni Achnas
- Written by: Nan Triveni Achnas; Rayya Makarim
- Produced by: Christine Hakim; Shanty Harmayn; Harris Lasmana; Makoto Ueda
- Starring: Christine Hakim; Dian Sastrowardoyo
- Cinematography: Yadi Sugandhy
- Edited by: Frans Paat
- Music by: Thoersi Argeswara
- Release date: 2001
- Running time: 106 minutes
- Country: Indonesia
- Language: Indonesian

Whispering Sands (Pasir Berbisik) is a 2001 Indonesian drama film directed by Nan Triveni Achnas and starring Christine Hakim and Dian Sastrowardoyo as a mother and her teenage daughter who are refugees making their way across endless sand dunes.

== Plot ==
Berlian and her teenage daughter Daya are on the run from political violence. Constantly daydreaming that her absent father will return, young Daya chafes under the stern hand of her mother. Forced to move inland from their seaside home to a desert of constantly shifting sands, the pair settle down to their familiar antagonism. Finally, Daya sees a vaguely familiar face shuffle in from across the wasteland.

== Cast ==
- Christine Hakim as Berlian
- Dian Sastrowardoyo as Daya
- Slamet Rahardjo as Agus (Daya's father)
- Didi Petet as Suwito
- Charma Juinda as Sukma

== Festivals and awards ==
The film has been screened at many film festivals worldwide. Accolades include:

- Best New Director, Cinematography and Sound: Asia Pacific Film Festival 2001
- Best Actress: Deauville Asian Film Festival 2002
- Best Actress: Singapore International Film Festival 2002
- Asian Tradewinds Special Jury Prize: Seattle International Film Festival 2002
- Special Mention from Netpac July: Brisbane International Film Festival 2002
