= ISwara (radio network) =

iSwara
- Type: Top 40/CHR AC
- Country: Indonesia
- Availability: National
- Radio stations: See below
- Headquarters: Sarinah Tower 8th floor, Jl. MH. Thamrin 11 Central Jakarta
- Owner: MRA Broadcast Media
- Launch date: 1 September 2000 (Jakarta & Bandung); 1 September 2000 (national expansion)
- Former names: i-Radio/iRadio (2001–2025)
- Official website: iswaranetwork.com

PM2FGE
- Central Jakarta, Jakarta; Indonesia
- Broadcast area: Jabodetabek and surrounding areas
- Frequency: 101.4 MHz
- Branding: iSwara Jakarta

Ownership
- Owner: MRA Broadcast Media (PT Radio Mustika Abadi)
- Sister stations: The Rockin' Life 87.6 FM Jakarta, Trax

History
- First air date: 1 September 2000

iSwara (stylized as iSWARA, formerly I-Radio) is an Indonesian radio network headquartered in Jakarta. The network only plays Indonesian Hot AC & CHR.

Its headquarters are at Sarinah Tower Lt 8, Jl. MH. Thamrin 11 Central Jakarta.

== History ==
The MRA Group, at that time had owned Hard Rock FM, was expanding their radio network. In 2000, MRA created IRADIO and TRAXFM by acquisitions. IRADIO broadcast for the first time on 3 April 2000, while MTV On Sky was on test broadcast until 1 July 2000.

== Programming ==
- Masih Pagi-Pagi
- Kirim Salam
- Masih Sore-Sore
- 10 Lagu Keren I-Radio (formerly Indonesia Keren Banget)
- due to Jakarta relay everyday 2pm-4pm WIB)
- Zona Cinta (weekend)
- Cutting Edge (Sunday)
- Newsbuzz (news)

== Network ==
IRADIO has 3 provincial stations, makes it the most nationwide MRA radio brand.

- 101.4 Trax FM Jakarta (PM2FGE)
- 105.1 Trax FM Bandung (PM3FXU)
- 88.7 Trax FM Yogyakarta (PM5FIY)

== Slogan ==
- 100% Musik Indonesia (100% Indonesian Music) (2000–present)
- Cinta Musik Indonesia (Love Indonesian Music) (2010–present)
- Indonesia Keren Banget (Indonesia's Very Amazing) (2013–2016)
- Juaranya Musik Indonesia (The Champion in Indonesian Music) (2017–present)
