= Rujak soto =

Indonesian Salad

- Type: Salad
- Place of origin: Indonesia
- Region or state: Java
- Created by: Javanese

Rujak soto is an Indonesian traditional salad made up of unique blend between beef soto and rujak cingur. A local speciality in which the vegetables (water spinach and bean sprouts) rujak served with lontong rice cake in petis sauce poured with soto soup. It is a delicacy of Javanese (Osing) from Banyuwangi, East Java. Generally, rujak soto is served along with es temulawak—that made up of Curcuma zanthorrhiza.

Rujak soto was created by Usni Solihin in 1975.

== See also ==
- Acar
- Asinan
- Gado-gado
- Rujak
- Pecel
- Soto
