= The Rockin' Life =

The Rockin' Life PT. Radio Antarnusa Djaja (Jakarta) PT. Radio Ekacita Swara Buana (Bandung) PT. Radio Baturiti Menara Swara (Bali)
- Type: AC and classic alternative radio network
- Availability: National
- Radio stations: See below
- Headquarters: Wisma MRA Jl. TB Simatupang No. 19, Cilandak, Jakarta, Indonesia
- Broadcast area: Jabodetabek
- Owner: MRA Broadcast Media
- Launch date: 20 April 1996
- Former names: Hard Rock FM
- Official website: therockinlife.com

The Rockin' Life (TRL for short) is an Indonesian music radio network owned by MRA Media. It was named Hard Rock FM, under license of Hard Rock Cafe. Started broadcasting in 1996, Hard Rock FM claims itself as first lifestyle radio in Indonesia, especially Jakarta. Despite its name, it does not only play hard rock genre music but jazz, pop, alternative and other popular music genres.

PM2FPB
- Central Jakarta, Jakarta; Indonesia
- Broadcast area: Jabodetabek
- Frequency: 87.6 MHz
- Branding: Hard Rock 87.6 FM Jakarta

Programming
- Languages: Indonesian, English in rare occasions

Ownership
- Owner: MRA Broadcast Media (PT Radio Antar Nusa Djaja)
- Sister stations: Trax 101,4 FM Jakarta

History
- First air date: 20 April 1996

Technical information
- Class: A

Links
- Webcast: https://hardrockfm.com/streaming/

Its flagship station is The Rockin' Life Jakarta (87.6 FM), with the call sign PM2FPB.

== Network ==
Hard Rock FM has a network in four cities in Indonesia:

- Jakarta (87.6 FM, PM2FPB)
- Bandung (87.7 FM, PM3FXI)
- Surabaya (89.7 FM, PM6FNV)
- Bali (87.8 FM, PM8FWA)

== Jingles ==
In 1996 until 2002, Hard Rock FM used jingles from JAM Creative Productions in Dallas, Texas. Since 2002, they used jingles from IQ Beats.

=== JAM's jngles (1996–2002) ===
- Listen all the time, Hard Rock FM
- Starting to the end of the day, Hard Rock FM
- 87.6 Hard Rock FM
- 87.6 wherever you go, This is Good Morning Hard Rockers Show
- Information Hard Rock FM

=== IQ Beats' jingles (since 2002) ===
- Party with no limitation, Hard Rock FM
- The best hits, Hard Rock FM
- The beautiful sounds, Hard Rock FM
- Hard Rock FM Sounds KPop Top 41
- Let's enjoy your life, Hard Rock FM
- 87.6 Hard Rock Radio Bali
- 87.6 Hard Rock FM
- 87.6 Hard Rock FM
- 89.5 Hard Rock FM
- Enjoy your life, cruising on the drive and jive
