= Nurdin Halid =

Indonesian politician

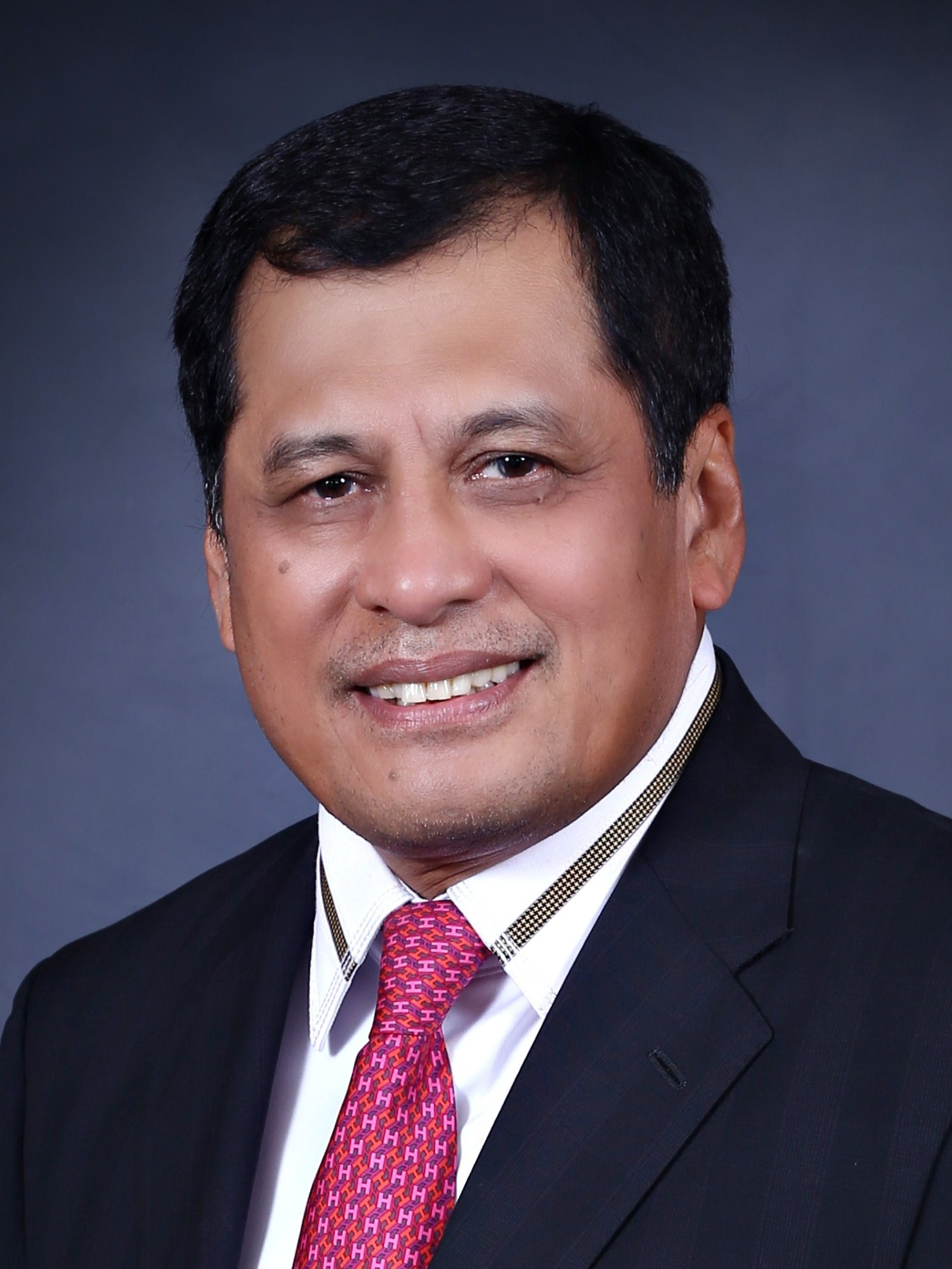

Chair of the Football Association of Indonesia
- In office 2003–2011
- Preceded by: Agum Gumelar
- Succeeded by: Agum Gumelar; Djohar Arifin Husin

Personal details
- Born: Nurdin Halid; November 17, 1958 (age 67) Watampone, South Sulawesi, Indonesia
- Party: Golkar Party
- Education: State University of Makassar
- Occupation: Businessman and politician

Nurdin Halid (born November 17, 1958) is an Indonesian businessman, politician, and convict. He is the deputy chairman of the Management Board of the Golkar Party and chairman of the Indonesian Cooperatives Council (DEKOPIN).

== Early life ==
Nurdin was born in Kampuno, Watampone, South Sulawesi.

== Golkar Party ==
Nurdin Halid is deputy chairman of Golkar Party's Management Board for the 2019-2024 period. He previously served as the party's chief executive.

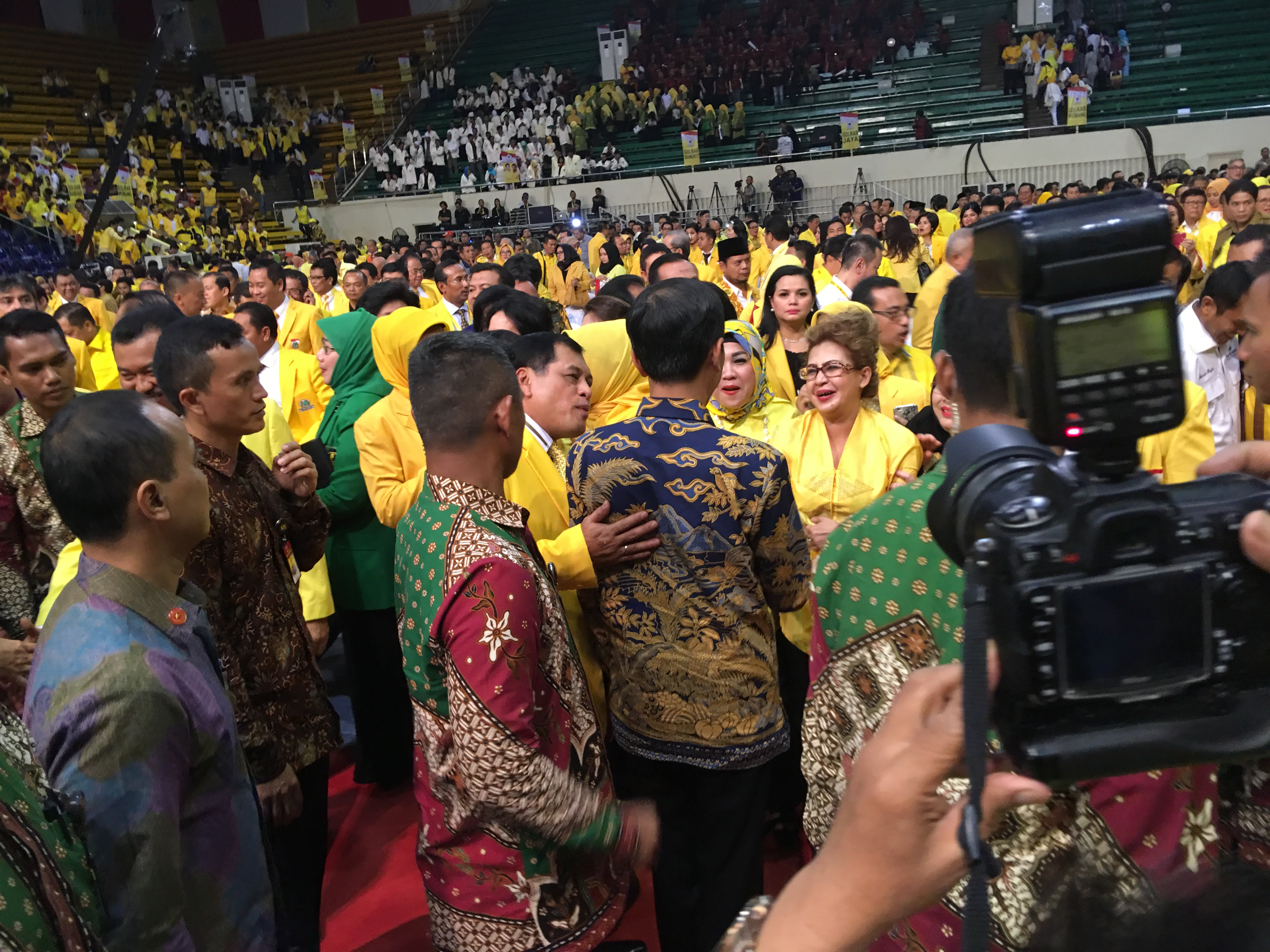
Nurdin Halid with President Joko Widodo in Golkar Party National Meeting

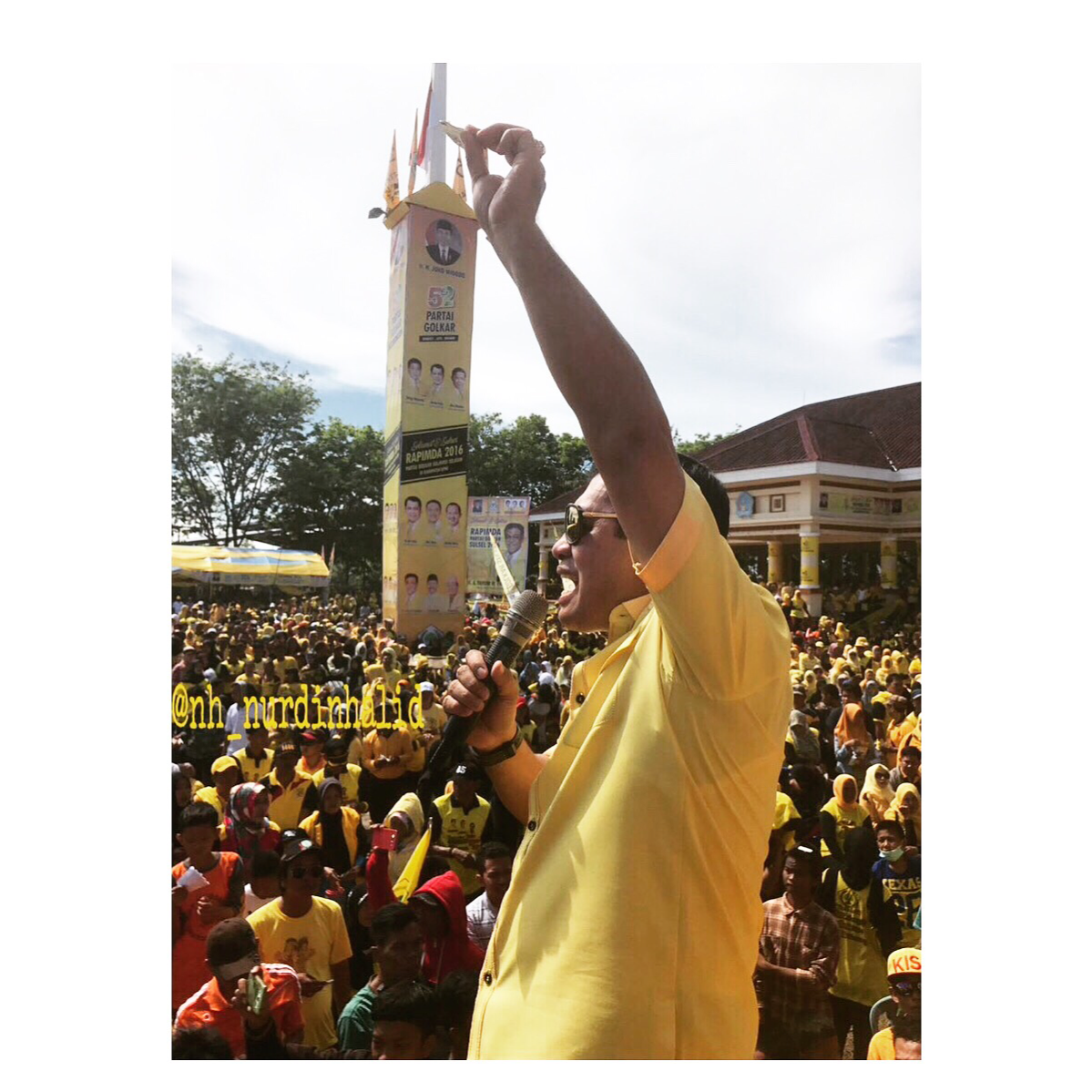
Nurdin Halid in Bone

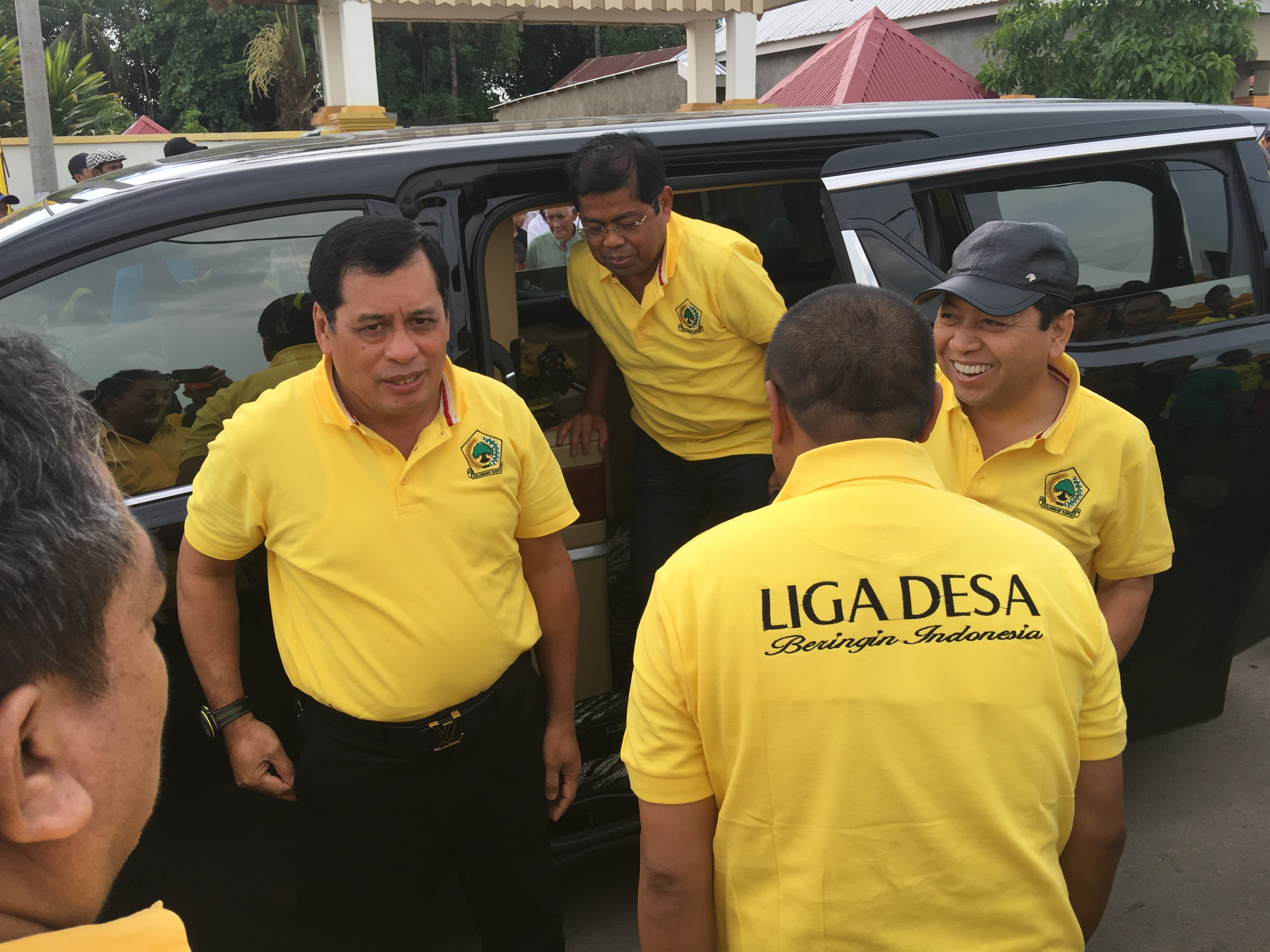
Nurdin Halid in the opening ceremony of Golkar Party Villages Soccer League in Takalar

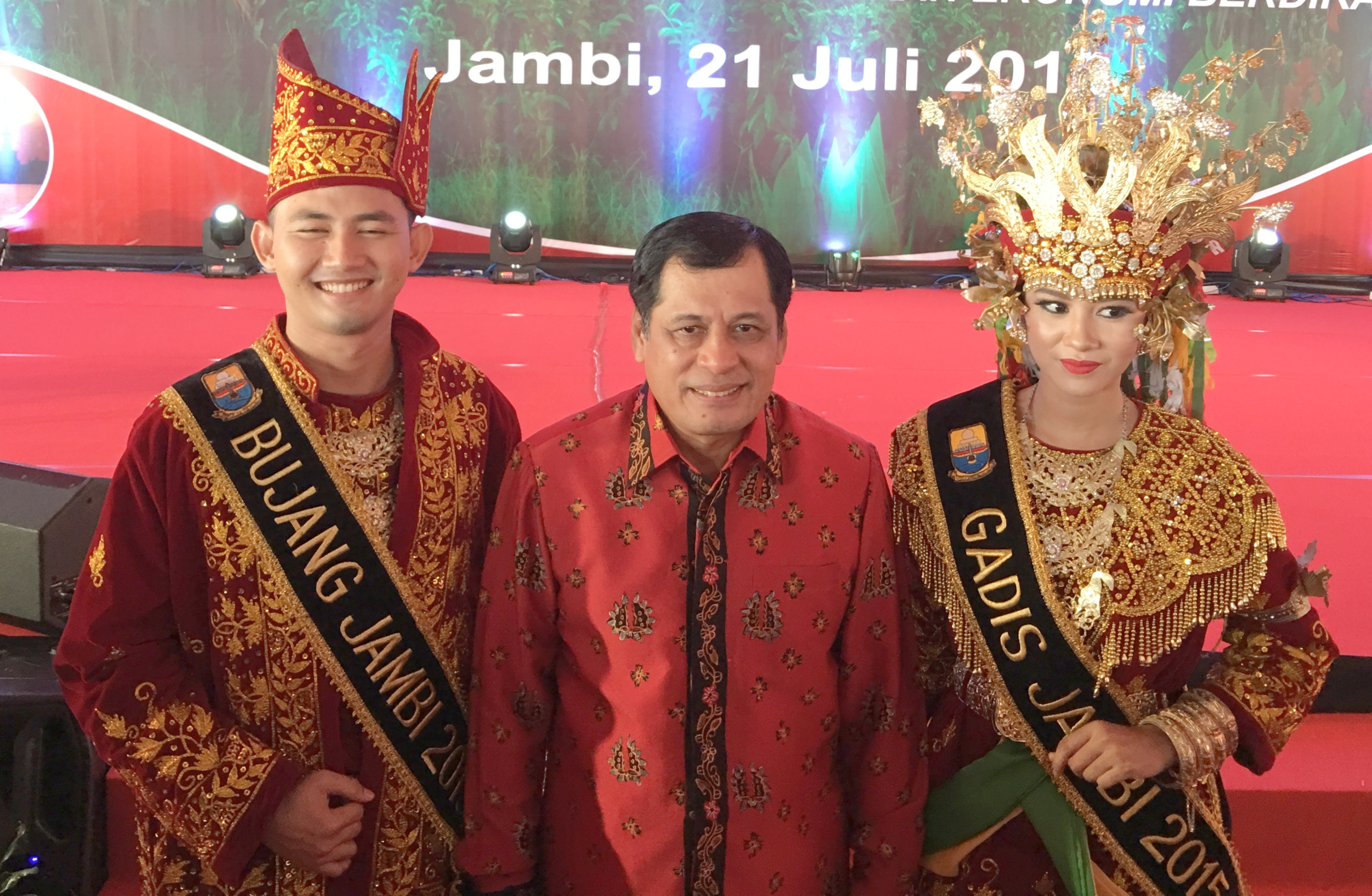
Nurdin Halid in National Co-Operative Day in Jambi

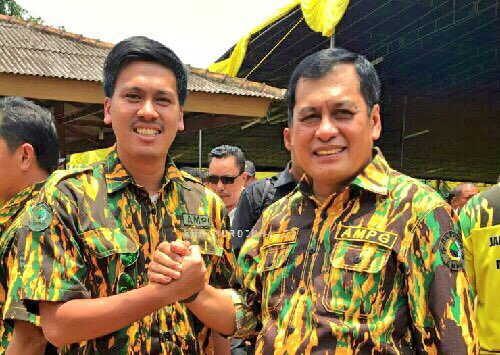
Nurdin Halid and son Andi Haldin

== DEKOPIN leadership ==
Nurdin first chaired Dekopin for the 1999-2004 period. He next led the organization for the 2004-2009 period, but his detention for illegal sugar imports led to a rival leadership headed by politician Adi Sasono. For 2009-2014 and 2014-2019, no one challenged Nurdin to the leadership of Dekopin, despite his notoriety for corruption and embezzlement. In 2019, Nurdin was initially challenged by Fadel Muhammad and Jimly Asshiddiqie for the Dekopin leadership for the 2019-2024 period, but the two dropped out of the race. Nevertheless, Dekopin still held an election with Nurdin as the sole candidate and he received 435 votes from among the 514 voters.

== Legal cases ==
=== Clove fund embezzlement scandal ===
From 1992 to 1998, Halid was director of the government-owned Central Unit of Village Cooperatives (Puskud) for Hasanuddin village in Ujung Pandang (now called Makassar), the capital of South Sulawesi province. Puskud Hasanuddin supplied a clove trading monopoly, the Clove Support and Trading Board (BPPC), run by President Suharto's youngest son, Tommy. Under the monopoly, clove farmers were forced to sell to BPPC at massively reduced prices, while the cloves were then sold to cigarette manufacturers at inflated prices.

In December 1995, some 20 farmers, representing 300 clove farmers in Bone Regency, South Sulawesi, protested against alleged fraud, embezzlement, and economic crimes by the Halid family.

Following the fall of Suharto and the dismantling of the clove monopoly in 1998, Nurdin went on trial in December 1998 for allegedly embezzling Rp 115.7 billion from a compulsory savings fund (SWKP, Simpanan Wajib Khusus Petani) of South Sulawesi clove farmers. His acquittal by Ujung Pandang District Court in 1999 sparked protests and claims that Attorney General Andi Ghalib, a former deputy governor of South Sulawesi, had intervened on Nurdin's behalf. Nurdin had previously funded Ghalib's failed bid to become Governor of South Sulawesi. Gagoek Soebagyanto, the prosecutor who initiated charges against Nurdin and wanted to have him detained pending trial, was dismissed by Ghalib, while another prosecutor involved in the case was transferred to Irian Jaya (now Papua) province. In March 1999, the new prosecutors handling the case told the court that Nurdin should be freed. They claimed there was a legal basis for the criminal act of misusing SWKP funds as collateral for bank credit without the permission of the owners. Judges were criticized for refusing to allow testimony from a key witness, a bank official. In addition to acquitting Nurdin, the panel of judges also ordered the release of confiscated evidence, including his luxury home and a deposit of Rp 8 billion in the name of Puskud Hasanuddin. Judges said that although the four indictments concerned irregularities in clove purchases, irregularities in the release of clove farmers' funds, irregularities in working capital, and irregularities in funding, all payments had been settled. University students, professors, and lecturers protested what they described as "the death of justice". Police responded to one protest by firing live ammunition.

=== Illegal sugar import case ===
On July 16, 2004, Halid, who the day before had been appointed as the Chairman of the National Federation of Rural Cooperatives (Dekopin) for 2004–2009, was arrested and detained by the police after he was named as a suspect in the case of illegally importing 73.520 tons of sugar.

=== Cooking oil distribution fund corruption ===
On 2 November 2004, Halid was investigated by the Indonesian National Police for his involvement in the cooking oil distribution fund corruption case which cost the state Rp169 billion. Prosecutors recommended a 20-year jail sentence, but he was acquitted by South Jakarta District Court on 16 June 2005. Prosecutors appealed to the Supreme Court of Indonesia and on 13 August 2007, Halid was convicted guilty and sentenced to two years' imprisonment.

=== Vietnam rice import customs violation ===
On August 9, 2005, Halid, who at the time was the Chairman of Village Cooperative Unit Center (Inkud), was sentenced to 2 years and 6 months by the North Jakarta District Court, after he was pronounced guilty of violating customs on imports of rice from Vietnam. On August 17, 2006, Halid was released after receiving an Indonesian Independence Day remission.

== FIFA ban ==
In March 2011, FIFA banned chairman Halid from running as the third-term candidate in PSSI. "FIFA upholds the statutes that state a convict cannot lead a football organization".

The FIFA Emergency Committee met on April 1, 2011, and announced on April 4, 2011, that control of the PSSI would pass to a normalisation committee made up of personalities in Indonesian football to oversee presidential elections by May 21, 2011. It also barred Halid from standing, along with three other candidates, George Toisutta, Arifin Panigoro and Nirwan Bakrie.

Sporting positions
Preceded by Agum Gumelar	President of PSSI; 2003–2011	Succeeded by Djohar Arifin Husein
