= Laksmi Pamuntjak =

Indonesian writer

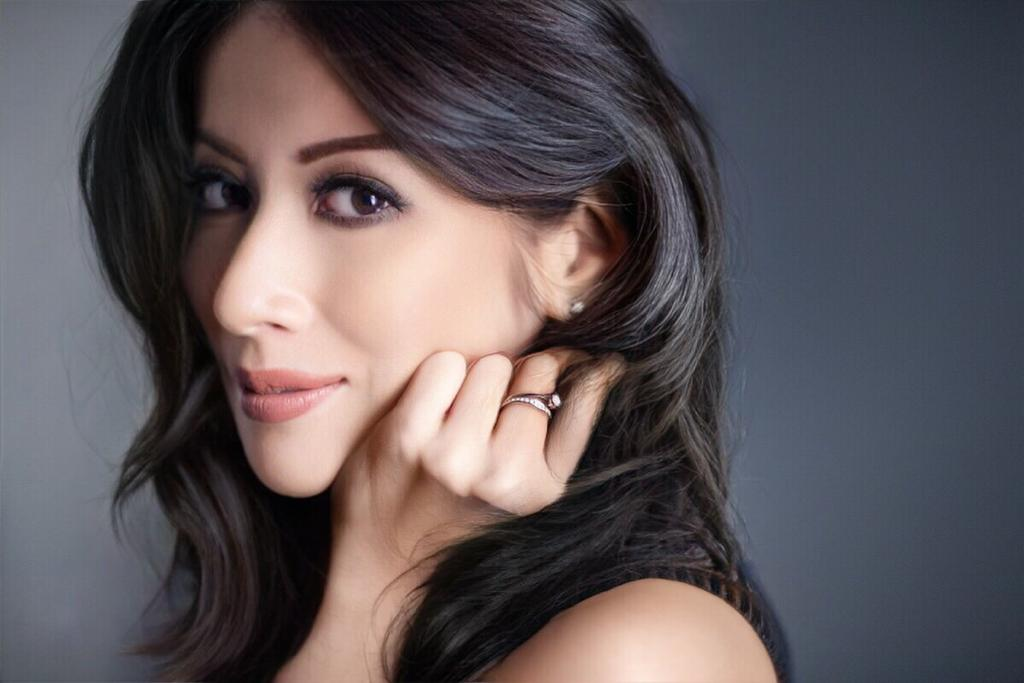
- Born: Laksmi Widorini Pamuntjak; 1971 (age 54–55); Jakarta, Indonesia
- Occupations: Novelist, poet, journalist, food critic
- Notable work: Amba (The Question of Red) (novel), Ellipsis (poetry), Kitab Kawin (short story)
- Spouse: Kian Guntur (m. 2021 - )
- Children: Nadia Larasati
- Awards: LiBeraturpreis & Singapore Book Award
- Website: https://laksmipamuntjak.com/

Laksmi Pamuntjak (born 1971) is an Indonesian novelist, poet, journalist and food critic based in Jakarta. In 2016, she won the LiBeraturpreis for the German translation of her debut novel, Amba/The Question of Red. In 2018, the movie adaptation of her second novel, Aruna dan Lidahnya, won two prizes at the Festival Film Indonesia. In 2020, her third novel, Fall Baby, won the Singapore Book Award for Best Literary Work. She also writes widely on culture and politics, including for the Jakarta Post and the Indonesian newsmagazine Tempo, as well as international publications such as South China Morning Post and the Guardian.

== Early life and education ==
Pamuntjak was born in Jakarta, Indonesia, to a German-trained architect father, Dipl. Ing. Mustafa Pamuntjak, and a beautician mother, Endang Soeyono Martowardojo. Pamuntjak’s paternal grandfather, Kasoema Sutan Pamuntjak, was one of the directors of the Indonesian state-owned publishing house Balai Pustaka before he co-founded Djambatan publishing house in 1954.

Pamuntjak went to high school at the United World College of Southeast Asia in Singapore and matriculated at Presbyterian Ladies’ College in Perth in 1989. In 1993, she graduated with a Bachelor’s degree (with First Class Honors) in Asian Studies from Murdoch University.

Pamuntjak’s only daughter, Nadia Larasati, was born in Jakarta in 1996.

== Career ==
Pamuntjak began her journalistic career by writing on literature and politics for TEMPO newsmagazine in the mid-1990s. She also wrote movie, classical music, restaurant and book reviews for the Jakarta Post. In 2015, she began writing op-eds on Indonesian politics and culture for the Guardian. Her writing also appeared in South China Morning Post, Frankfurter Allgemeine Sonntagszeitung , and Die Welt.

In 2001, Pamuntjak co-founded Aksara Bookstore with her childhood friends, Winfred Hutabarat and Davy Djohan. The same year also saw the publication of the first edition of her award-winning Jakarta Good Food Guide –an independent culinary guide series to Jakarta.

Pamuntjak’s collections of poetry, Ellipsis and The Anagram, were published in 2005 and 2007 respectively. Her collection of short fictions inspired by paintings, The Diary of R.S.: Musings on Art, was published in 2006, followed by the publication of her treatise on man, violence and mythology Perang, Langit dan Dua Perempuan in 2007. Her poetry and prose were later republished in a 2016 collection, There Are Tears in Things: Selected Poems and Prose by Laksmi Pamuntjak (2001 – 2016).

In 2012, Pamuntjak represented Indonesia at Poetry Parnassus, a historic gathering of world poets at the Southbank Centre, London, held in conjunction with the 2012 London Olympics.

Pamuntjak’s two novels in Bahasa Indonesia, Amba/The Question of Red and Aruna dan Lidahnya, were published in 2012 and 2014 respectively, while her first novel in English, Fall Baby (which was later published in Bahasa Indonesia as Kekasih Musim Gugur) came out in 2019.

In 2020, Pamuntjak published Kitab Kawin (The Book of Mating), a collection of short stories on women in relationships.

== Award-Winning Works ==
Alle Farben Rot, the German translation of Pamuntjak’s debut novel, Amba/The Question of Red, won the LiBeraturpreis in 2016. Alle Farben Rot was also named #1 on Germany’s Weltempfaenger list of the best works of fiction from Asia, Africa, Latin America and the Arab World translated into German. In Indonesia, Amba/The Question of Red was shortlisted for the 2013 Khatulistiwa Literary Award. A modern love story set against the backdrop of the Indonesian Communist mass-massacres of 1965-1968, the novel has been translated into English, German and Dutch.

In 2018, Pamuntjak’s first novel in English, Fall Baby, was published in Germany under the title Herbstkind. A year later, the original English version won the Singapore Literary Award for Best Literary Work.

== Curatorial Works ==
In 2014, Pamuntjak co-curated the Fatahillah Food Festival with Hana Makarim as part of the Jakarta Old Town Revitalization program.

In 2022, she co-curated Pameran 100 Tahun Chairil Anwar: Aku Berkisar Antara Mereka, a literary exhibition to commemorate the centennial of the great Indonesian poet Chairil Anwar at Galeri Salihara.

Between 2009 and 2011, she was an international jury member of the Prince Claus Award.

== Novel to Movie Adaptation ==
Pamuntjak’s second novel, Aruna dan Lidahnya, published in 2014, was shortlisted for the 2015 Khatulistiwa Literary Award. In 2018, the novel was adapted into a movie of the same name and directed by Edwin. The movie had its European premiere at the Berlinale International Film Festival in February 2019.

== Podcast ==
Pamuntjak’s latest work, Kitab Kawin (The Book of Mating), a collection of short stories on women in relationships, was published in 2021. A podcast based on the stories Podcast Kitab Kawin, was launched in the same year, combining Pamuntjak’s reading, her recounting of the creative process behind the stories, and her interviews with a wide range of experts, academics and survivors. Among the darker and complex subjects examined in the podcast are domestic violence, sexual violence toward women and children, and child marriage.

== Keynote Speeches ==
Pamuntjak was the keynote speaker at the opening of the 9th European Southeast Asian Studies Association (EuroSEAS) Conference at the University of Oxford in 2017. The title of her speech was Between Hope and Despair: Living with Difference in Today’s Indonesia. She also delivered the keynote speech entitled Claiming Ownership of One’s Freed Selves: Art and Morality in Today’s Indonesia for the opening of the Indonesia Council Open Conference in 2019, held at the Australian National University, Canberra.

== Bibliography ==
Novels

- Kekasih Musim Gugur (Jakarta: Gramedia Pustaka Utama, 2020)
- Fall Baby (Singapore: Penguin Random House SEA, 2019)
- Herbstkind (Berlin: Ullstein Verlag, 2018)
- Birdwoman’s Palate (Seattle: Amazon Crossing, 2018)
- The Question of Red (Seattle: Amazon Crossing, 2016)
- Alle Farben Rot (Berlin: Ullstein Verlag, 2015)
- Amba Of De Kleur van Rood (Amsterdam: Xander Uitgevers, 2015)
- Aruna dan Lidahnya (Jakarta: Gramedia Pustaka Utama, 2014)
- Amba (Jakarta: Gramedia Pustaka Utama, 2012)

Poetry

- There Are Tears and Things: Collected Poetry and Prose (2001-2016) by Laksmi Pamuntjak (Jakarta: Gramedia Pustaka Utama, 2016)
- The Anagram (Jakarta: KataKita, 2007)
- Ellipsis: Poems and Prose Poems (Jakarta: KataKita, 2005)

Short Stories

- Kitab Kawin (Jakarta: Gramedia Pustaka Utama, 2021)
- There Are Tears and Things: Collected Poetry and Prose (2001-2016) by Laksmi Pamuntjak (Jakarta: Gramedia Pustaka Utama, 2016)
- The Diary of R.S.: Musings on Art (Jakarta: KataKita, 2006)

Philopsohical Essay/Treatise

- Perang, Langit dan Dua Perempuan (Jakarta: Freedom Institute and Penerbit Nalar, 2006)

Food Writing

- The Jakarta Good Food Guide 2009-2010 (Supplement to the Jakarta Good Food Guide 2008-2009, Jakarta: Pena Gaia Klasik, 2008)
- The Jakarta Good Food Guide 2008-2009 (Jakarta: Pena Gaia Klasik, 2008)
- The Jakarta Good Food Guide 2002-2003 (Jakarta: Pena Gaia Klasik, 2002)
- The Jakarta Good Food Guide 2001 (Jakarta: Pena Gaia Klasik, 2001)

Translations

- On God and Other Unfinished Things: Aphorisms by Goenawan Mohamad (Jakarta: KataKita, 2007)
- Goenawan Mohamad: Selected Poems (Jakarta: KataKita, 2004)
