= 2009 Indonesian Movie Awards =

Film industry award ceremony

3rd Annual Indonesian Movie Awards
- Date: May 15, 2009
- Location: Tennis Indoor Senayan, Central Jakarta
- Country: Indonesia
- Hosted by: Luna Maya; Ruben Onsu; Raffi Ahmad

Television/radio coverage
- Network: RCTI

The 3rd Annual Indonesian Movie Awards was held on May 15, 2009, at the Tennis Indoor Senayan, Central Jakarta. The award show was hosted by Luna Maya, Ruben Onsu, and Raffi Ahmad. And the nominations have been announced for the category of Favorite, which will be chosen by the public via SMS. As for the category of Best, will be selected by a jury that has been appointed. For the category which contested are the same as last year's celebration.

Selection of winners for all categories of Best determined by the jury consisting of Ratna Riantiarno, Niniek L. Karim, Didi Petet, El Manik, Darwis Triadi, and Jajang C. Noer. While the category of Favorite, determined based on SMS polling majority of public. Of the 42 films were registered following the 2009 of celebration, only 16 film titles were entered into nomination.

Laskar Pelangi and Perempuan Berkalung Sorban is the film with the most awards this year, respectively taking home five and four awards. Gara-Gara Bola won two awards, and other films taking home one award each.

== Nominees and winners ==
=== Best ===
Winners are listed first and highlighted in boldface.

Best Actor	Best Actress
**Ikranagara – Laskar Pelangi**; Lukman Sardi – Pencarian Terakhir; Nicholas Saputra – 3 Doa 3 Cinta; Sophan Sophiaan – Love; Winky Wiryawan – Gara-Gara Bola	**Cut Mini – Laskar Pelangi**; Ladya Cheryl – fiksi.; Revalina S. Temat – Perempuan Berkalung Sorban; Richa Novisha – Pencarian Terakhir; Widyawati – Love
Best Supporting Actor	Best Supporting Actress
**Lukman Sardi – Kawin Kontrak Lagi**; Ario Bayu – Laskar Pelangi; Joshua Pandelaki – Perempuan Berkalung Sorban; Rifnu Rafika – Kawin Kontrak Lagi; Yoga Pratama – 3 Doa 3 Cinta	**Nasya Abigail – Perempuan Berkalung Sorban**; Asri Pramawaty – Suami-Suami Takut Istri; Kinaryosih – fiksi.; Sarah Sechan – Si Jago Merah; Sigi Wimala – Kalau Cinta Jangan Cengeng
Best Newcomer Actor	Best Newcomer Actress
**Judika – Si Jago Merah**; Ferdian – Laskar Pelangi; Zulfanny – Laskar Pelangi	**Laura Basuki – Gara-Gara Bola**; Jenny Chang – Karma; Sharon Jessica – Chika

=== Favorite ===
Winners are listed first and highlighted in boldface.

Favorite Actor	Favorite Actress
**Sophan Sophiaan – Love**; Ikranagara – Laskar Pelangi; Lukman Sardi – Pencarian Terakhir; Nicholas Saputra – 3 Doa 3 Cinta; Winky Wiryawan – Gara-Gara Bola	**Revalina S. Temat – Perempuan Berkalung Sorban**; Cut Mini – Laskar Pelangi; Ladya Cheryl – fiksi.; Richa Novisha – Pencarian Terakhir; Widyawati – Love
Favorite Supporting Actor	Favorite Supporting Actress
**Joshua Pandelaki – Perempuan Berkalung Sorban**; Ario Bayu – Laskar Pelangi; Lukman Sardi – Kawin Kontrak Lagi; Rifnu Rafika – Kawin Kontrak Lagi; Yoga Pratama – 3 Doa 3 Cinta	**Nasya Abigail – Perempuan Berkalung Sorban**; Asri Pramawati – Suami-Suami Takut Istri; Kinaryosih – fiksi.; Sarah Sechan – Si Jago Merah; Sigi Wimala – Kalau Cinta Jangan Cengeng
Favorite Newcomer Actor	Favorite Newcomer Actress
**Zulfanny – Laskar Pelangi**; Ferdian – Laskar Pelangi; Judika – Si Jago Merah	**Laura Basuki – Gara-Gara Bola**; Jenny Chang – Karma; Sharon Jessica – Chika
Favorite Soundtrack	Favorite Film
**"Laskar Pelangi" performed by Nidji – Laskar Pelangi**; "Ayat-Ayat Cinta" performed by Rossa – Ayat-Ayat Cinta; "I Love You, Bibeh" performed by The Changcuters – The Tarix Jabrix; "Sempurna" performed by Gita Gutawa – Love; "Tak Perlu Keliling Dunia" performed by Gita Gutawa – Laskar Pelangi	**Laskar Pelangi**; 3 Doa 3 Cinta; Ayat-Ayat Cinta; Chika; fiksi.; Gara-Gara Bola; Kalau Cinta Jangan Cengeng; Love; Pencarian Terakhir; Perempuan Berkalung Sorban

== Film with most nominations and awards ==
=== Most nominations ===
The following film received most nominations:

Nominations	Film
13	Laskar Pelangi
10	Ayat-Ayat Cinta
9	Perempuan Berkalung Sorban
6	Love
6	Kawin Kontrak Lagi
5	fiksi.
5	Pencarian Terakhir
5	3 Doa 3 Cinta
5	Gara-Gara Bola
4	Si Jago Merah
3	Kalau Cinta Jangan Cengeng
3	Chika
2	Karma
2	Suami-Suami Takut Istri

=== Most wins ===
The following film received most nominations:

Awards	Film
5	Laskar Pelangi
4	Perempuan Berkalung Sorban
2	Gara-Gara Bola
