= List of accolades received by Marlina the Murderer in Four Acts =

List of accolades received by Marlina and the Murderer in Four Acts
- Marlina the Murderer in Four Acts broke the record for most wins and nominations at the Citra Awards.
Accolades
Award	Won	Nominated
AFI Fest	0	1
Asia-Pacific Film Festival	2	8
Asia-Pacific Screen Awards	0	1
Asian Academy Creative Awards	2	4
Asian Film Awards	0	4
Bandung Film Festival	2	7
Cannes Film Festival	0	2
Citra Awards	10	15
Gothenburg Film Festival	0	1
Indonesian Movie Awards	3	9
International Film Festival Rotterdam	0	1
Maya Awards	5	13
Sitges Film Festival	1	1
Tempo Film Festival	2	6
Tokyo FILMeX	1	1
- Total number of awards and nominations
Totals	29	74
- References

Marlina the Murderer in Four Acts is a 2017 Indonesian thriller drama film directed by Mouly Surya based on a story conceived by Garin Nugroho and a screenplay co-written by Surya and Rama Adi. The film's Western style, its feminist tone, and rural Indonesian setting led to the term "satay Western" being coined following its world premiere in the Directors' Fortnight section of the 2017 Cannes Film Festival.

At the 38th Citra Awards, the film won 10 awards out of 15 nominations, breaking the records for most wins and nominations at Indonesia's top film awards previously held by Teguh Karya's 1986 film Ibunda with 9 awards out of 10 nominations at the 17th Citra Awards. It was also selected as the Indonesian official entry for the Best Foreign Language Film at the 91st Academy Awards, but failed to secure a nomination.

Overall, throughout the 2017 and 2018 award seasons and film festivals calendar, Marlina the Murderer in Four Acts won 29 awards out of 74 nominations.

== AFI Fest ==
Year	Category	Recipients	Result	Ref.
2017	World Cinema Audience Award	Marlina the Murderer in Four Acts	Nominated	

== Asia-Pacific Film Festival ==
Year	Category	Recipients	Result	Ref.
2018	Best Film	Marlina the Murderer in Four Acts	Nominated	
2018	Best Director	Mouly Surya	Nominated	
2018	Best Actress	Marsha Timothy	Nominated	
2018	Best Cinematography	Yunus Pasolang	Won	
2018	Best Art Direction	Frans X. R. Paat	Nominated	
2018	Best Music	Zeke Khaseli; Yudhi Arfani	Nominated	
2018	Best Costume Design	Meutia Pudjowarsito	Nominated	
2018	Special Award	Marlina the Murderer in Four Acts	Won	

== Asia-Pacific Screen Awards ==
Year	Category	Recipients	Result	Ref.
2017	Achievement in Directing	Mouly Surya	Nominated	

== Asian Academy Creative Awards ==
Year	Category	Recipients	Result	Ref.
2018	Best Original Programme by a Streamer	Marlina the Murderer in Four Acts	Nominated	
2018	Best Original Screenplay	Mouly Surya; Rama Adi	Nominated	
2018	Best Cinematography	Yunus Pasolang	Won	
2018	Best Sound	Khikmawan Santosa	Won	

== Asian Film Awards ==
Year	Category	Recipients	Result	Ref.
2018	Best Actress	Marsha Timothy	Nominated	
2018	Best Cinematography	Yunus Pasolang	Nominated	
2018	Best Production Design	Frans X. R. Paat	Nominated	
2018	Best Sound	Khikmawan Santosa	Nominated	

== Bandung Film Festival ==
Year	Category	Recipients	Result	Ref.
2018	Best Film	Marlina the Murderer in Four Acts	Nominated	
2018	Best Director	Mouly Surya	Nominated	
2018	Best Actress	Marsha Timothy	Won	
2018	Best Supporting Actress	Dea Panendra	Nominated	
2018	Best Screenplay	Mouly Surya; Rama Adi	Nominated	
2018	Best Art Direction	Frans X. R. Paat	Nominated	
2018	Best Score	Zeke Khaseli; Yudhi Arfani	Won	

== Cannes Film Festival ==
Year	Category	Recipients	Result	Ref.
2017	Directors' Fortnight Art Cinema Award	Marlina the Murderer in Four Acts	Nominated	
2017	Queer Palm	Mouly Surya	Nominated	

== Citra Awards ==
Year	Category	Recipients	Result	Ref.
2018	Best Picture	Marlina the Murderer in Four Acts	Won	
2018	Best Director	Mouly Surya	Won	
2018	Best Actress	Marsha Timothy	Won	
2018	Best Supporting Actor	Egi Fedly	Nominated	
2018	Best Supporting Actor	Yoga Pratama	Nominated	
2018	Best Supporting Actress	Dea Panendra	Won	
2018	Best Original Screenplay	Mouly Surya; Rama Adi	Won	
2018	Best Original Score	Zeke Khaseli; Yudhi Arfani	Won	
2018	Best Sound	Khikmawan Santosa; Yusuf A. Patawari	Won	
2018	Best Editing	Kelvin Nugroho	Won	
2018	Best Cinematography	Yunus Pasolang	Won	
2018	Best Art Direction	Frans X. R. Paat	Won	
2018	Best Costume Design	Meutia Pudjowarsito	Nominated	
2018	Best Makeup & Hairstyling	Didin Syamsudin	Nominated	
2018	Best Visual Effects	Danny S. Kim; Teguh Raharjo	Nominated	

== Gothenburg Film Festival ==
Year	Category	Recipients	Result	Ref.
2018	Dragon Award for Best International Film	Marlina the Murderer in Four Acts	Nominated	

== Indonesian Movie Awards ==
Year	Category	Recipients	Result	Ref.
2018	Best Ensemble	Marlina the Murderer in Four Acts	Nominated	
2018	Favorite Film	Marlina the Murderer in Four Acts	Won	
2018	Best Actress	Marsha Timothy	Won	
2018	Favorite Actress	Marsha Timothy	Won	
2018	Best Supporting Actress	Dea Panendra	Nominated	
2018	Favorite Supporting Actress	Dea Panendra	Nominated	
2018	Best Newcomer	Dea Panendra	Nominated	
2018	Favorite Newcomer	Dea Panendra	Nominated	
2018	Best Chemistry	Marsha Timothy; Dea Panendra	Nominated	

== International Film Festival Rotterdam ==
Year	Category	Recipients	Result	Ref.
2018	NETPAC Award	Marlina the Murderer in Four Acts	Nominated	

== Maya Awards ==
Year	Category	Recipients	Result	Ref.
2017	Best Feature Film	Marlina the Murderer in Four Acts	Won	
2017	Best Director	Mouly Surya	Nominated	
2017	Best Actress in a Leading Role	Marsha Timothy	Won	
2017	Tuti Indra Malaon Award for Best New Actress	Dea Panendra	Nominated	
2017	Best Original Screenplay	Mouly Surya; Rama Adi	Nominated	
2017	Best Editing	Kelvin Nugroho	Nominated	
2017	Best Cinematography	Yunus Pasolang	Won	
2017	Best Art Direction	Frans X. R. Paat	Won	
2017	Best Sound	Khikmawan Santosa; Yusuf A. Patawari	Nominated	
2017	Best Original Score	Zeke Khaseli; Yudhi Arfani	Won	
2017	Best Costume Design	Meutia Pudjowarsito	Nominated	
2017	Best Makeup & Hairstyling	Didin Syamsudin	Nominated	
2017	Best Poster Design	Marlina the Murderer in Four Acts	Nominated	

== Sitges Film Festival ==
Year	Category	Recipients	Result	Ref.
2017	Best Actress	Marsha Timothy	Won	

== Tempo Film Festival ==
Year	Category	Recipients	Result	Ref.
2017	Best Film	Marlina and the Murderer in Four Acts	Won	
2017	Best Director	Mouly Surya	Nominated	
2017	Best Actor	Egi Fedly	Nominated	
2017	Best Actress	Marsha Timothy	Won	
2017	Best Supporting Actress	Dea Panendra	Nominated	
2017	Best Screenplay	Mouly Surya; Rama Adi	Nominated	

== Tokyo FILMeX ==
Year	Category	Recipients	Result	Ref.
2017	Grand Prize	Marlina and the Murderer in Four Acts	Won	
