= Ladya Cheryl =

Indonesian actress, model, and filmmaker

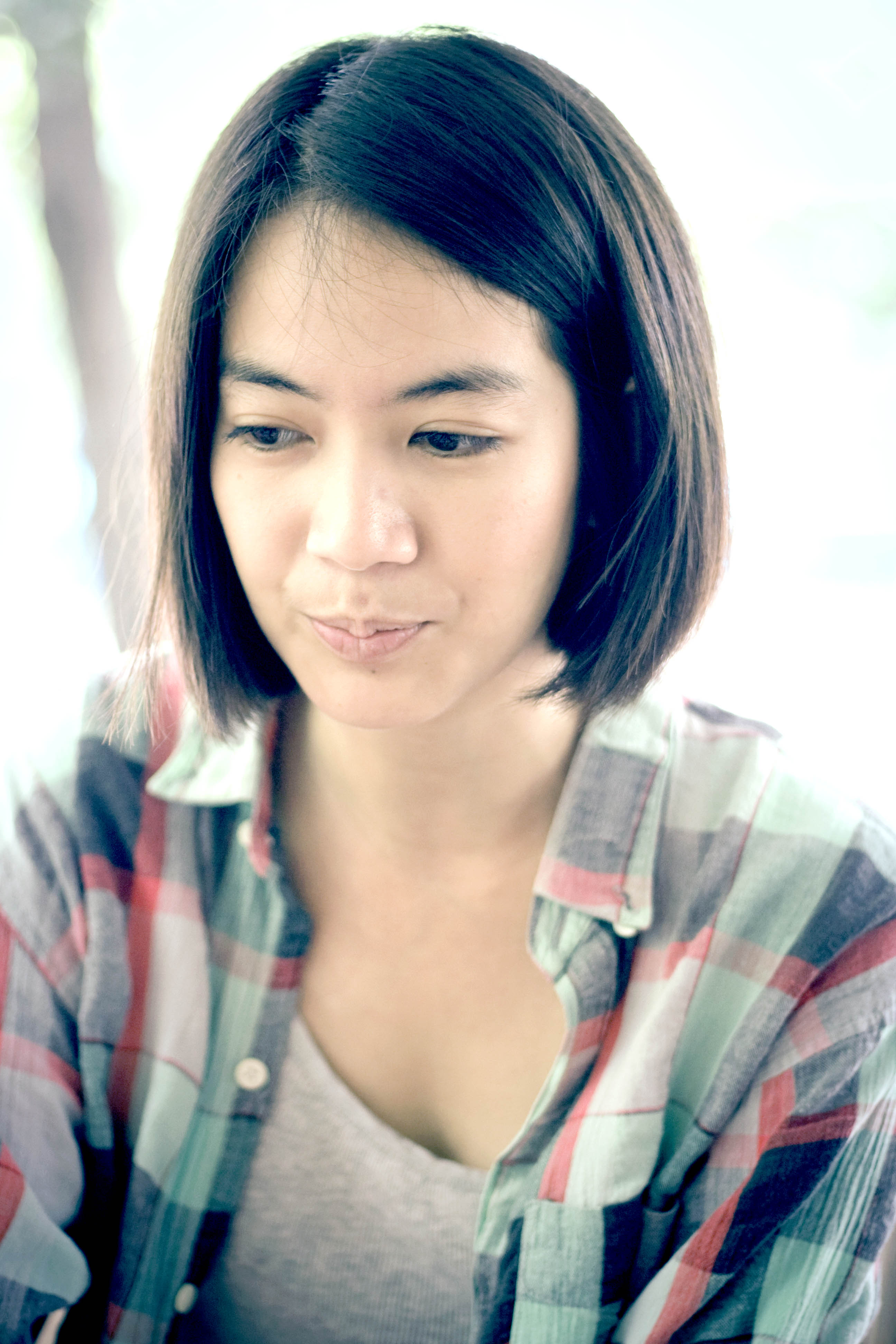
- Ladya Cheryl in 2011
- Born: Ladya Cheryl Baharrizki; 11 April 1981 (age 45); Jakarta, Indonesia
- Occupations: Actress; model; director; screenwriter
- Years active: 1997 - present
- Known for: Ada Apa dengan Cinta?
- Spouse: Zeke Khaseli (m. 2014)
- Relatives: Agum Gumelar (father-in-law); Taufik Hidayat (brother-in-law)

Ladya Cheryl Baharrizki (born in Jakarta, Indonesia on April 11, 1981) is an Indonesian actress, model, and filmmaker. She made her feature film debut playing the role of Alya in the 2002 drama Ada Apa dengan Cinta?, for which she received a Citra Award nomination for Best Supporting Actress. Cheryl won the Citra Award for Best Actress in 2022 for her performance as Iteung in Vengeance Is Mine, All Others Pay Cash.

== Career ==
Cheryl began her career as a model in the late 1990s. She appeared in a number of music videos before making her feature film debut playing the role of Alya in the 2002 hit drama Ada Apa dengan Cinta?, for which she received a Citra Award nomination for Best Supporting Actress. In 2008, she played the lead role of Alisha in Mouly Surya's award-winning directorial debut Fiksi. opposite Donny Alamsyah and Kinaryosih. For her performance, she garnered a Citra Award nomination for Best Actress, but lost to Fahrani.

Cheryl is a frequent collaborator of the Citra Award-winning director Edwin; having appeared in three of his short films and three of his feature films, including the universally acclaimed Vengeance Is Mine, All Others Pay Cash, an adaptation of Eka Kurniawan's novel of the same name. Cheryl received multiple Best Actress nominations for her performance as Iteung, winning her first Citra Award for Best Actress.

== Personal life ==
Cheryl is married to musician Zeke Khaseli, the son of former cabinet minister and retired special force general Agum Gumelar and former Minister for Women's Empowerment Linda Amalia Sari. They got married on 9 May 2014. Khaseli, whose real name is Haris Khaseli Gumelar, also works in the film industry as a composer for films, including Mouly Surya's Fiksi. in which Cheryl starred in the lead role.

She is also related to badminton champion and Olympic gold medalist Taufik Hidayat who is married to Ami Gumelar, her husband's sister.

In the 2008 film Blind Pig Who Wants to Fly, Cheryl portrayed the character of Linda while a younger version of her was portrayed by Clairine Baharrizki, who is her relative. The two also appeared together in Edwin's 2005 award-winning short film Kara, Anak Sebatang Pohon.

== Filmography ==
Title	Year	Role	Notes
2002	Ada Apa dengan Cinta?	Alya	
2003	Biarkan Bintang Menari	Neyna Neviana	
2005	Banyu Biru	Mysterious fortunetelling girl	
2005	Kara, Anak Sebatang Pohon	Unnamed character	Short film
2005	Trip to the Wound	Unnamed character	Short film
2008	Hulahoop Soundings	Lana	Short film
2008	Fiksi.	Alisha	
2008	Blind Pig Who Wants to Fly	Linda	
2012	Postcards from the Zoo	Lana	
2014	Return to Sender	Girl on the train	Short film
2016	Flutter Echoes and Notes Concerning Nature	Herself	Documentary film
2021	Vengeance Is Mine, All Others Pay Cash	Iteung	

=== Production credits ===
Year	Film	Director	Writer	Notes
2013	Vulgar	Yes	Yes	Short film
2015	Rial The Real	Yes	Yes	Short film
2015	Run to Your Mama	Yes	Yes	Short film
2017	Cleaning the Fish	No	Yes	Short film
2021	I Had a Dream	Yes	Yes	Short film

== Awards and nominations ==
Year	Award	Category	Work	Result
1997	Top Guest Aneka Yess!	Favorite Model	Herself	Won
2000	Face of Femina	Runner-Up	Herself	Won
2004	24th Citra Awards	Best Supporting Actress	Ada Apa dengan Cinta?	Nominated
2008	28th Citra Awards	Best Supporting Actress	Fiksi.	Nominated
2009	3rd Indonesian Movie Awards	Best Actress	Fiksi.	Nominated
2009	3rd Indonesian Movie Awards	Favorite Actress	Fiksi.	Nominated
2010	Dahsyatnya Awards	Outstanding Role in a Music Video	"Tak Ada Yang Abadi" by Peterpan	Nominated
2021	5th Tempo Film Festival	Best Actress	Vengeance Is Mine, All Others Pay Cash	Nominated
2022	42nd Citra Awards	Best Actress	Vengeance Is Mine, All Others Pay Cash	Won
2022	10th Maya Awards	Best Actress in a Leading Role	Vengeance Is Mine, All Others Pay Cash	Nominated
2022	35th Bandung Film Festival	Best Actress	Vengeance Is Mine, All Others Pay Cash	Nominated
2022	16th Indonesian Movie Awards	Best Actress	Vengeance Is Mine, All Others Pay Cash	Nominated
2022	16th Indonesian Movie Awards	Favorite Actress	Vengeance Is Mine, All Others Pay Cash	Nominated
