= Sophiaan =

Sophiaan is an Indonesian surname. Notable people with the surname include:

- Manai Sophiaan (1915–2003), Indonesian politician, journalist, and diplomat
- Sophan Sophiaan (1944–2008), Indonesian actor and politician
