= Marlina the Murderer in Four Acts =

2017 Indonesian film

- Teaser poster
- Marlina Si Pembunuh dalam Empat Babak
- Directed by: Mouly Surya
- Screenplay by: Mouly Surya; Rama Adi
- Story by: Garin Nugroho
- Produced by: Fauzan Zidni; Rama Adi
- Starring: Marsha Timothy; Yoga Pratama; Egi Fedly; Dea Panendra
- Cinematography: Yunus Pasolang
- Edited by: Kelvin Nugroho
- Music by: Zeke Khaseli; Yudhi Arfani
- Production companies: Cinesurya; Kaninga Pictures; Purin Pictures; Shasha & Co Production; Astro Shaw; Hooq
- Distributed by: Weird Wave (Greece); Pandora (Japan); Periscoop Film (Netherlands); Icarus Films (US); Kimstim Films (US)
- Release dates: 24 May 2017 (Cannes); 16 November 2017 (Indonesia)
- Running time: 93 minutes
- Country: Indonesia
- Language: Indonesian
- Box office: $23,564

Marlina the Murderer in Four Acts (Indonesian: Marlina Si Pembunuh dalam Empat Babak) is a 2017 Indonesian neo-Western thriller film directed by Mouly Surya based on a story conceived by Garin Nugroho and a screenplay co-written by Surya and Rama Adi. The film's Western style, its feminist tone, and rural Indonesian setting led to the term "satay Western" being coined following its world premiere in the Directors' Fortnight section of the 2017 Cannes Film Festival.

At the 38th Citra Awards, the film won 10 awards out of 15 nominations, breaking the records for most wins and nominations at Indonesia's top film awards previously held by Teguh Karya's 1986 film Ibunda with 9 awards out of 10 nominations at the 17th Citra Awards. It was also selected as the Indonesian official entry for the Best Foreign Language Film at the 91st Academy Awards, but failed to secure a nomination.

== Plot ==
In the first act, The Robbery, the film opens on the island of Sumba with Marlina grieving her late husband. A group of seven men, led by the aged Markus, arrive at her house intent on robbing Marlina of her livestock and raping her. They demand to be fed dinner, and she takes the opportunity to poison most of the robbers with chicken soup and decapitate Markus. She burns Markus' musical instrument, a jungga.

In the second act, The Journey, she hitches a ride on the local bus where she encounters the pregnant Novi, on the way to find her jealous husband Umbu before she delivers. They are joined by an old woman with a dowry payment of two horses on the way to her nephew's wedding. Along the way, two of the other robbers (including Franz) discover the deaths and chase after Marlina. They hijack the bus, but Marlina escapes with one of the horses. Along the way, Marlina is haunted by a headless apparition playing the jungga.

In the third act, The Confession, she arrives at the local police station and delivers a report of the robbery, rape, and her self-defense. The police accept the report but insist that they can't proceed for at least a month while they wait for funds to purchase rape test equipment. Marlina bonds with a young girl in a local warung.

In the fourth act, The Birth, Novi finally finds Umbu. He, believing that a breech baby is a sign of infidelity, hits her and leaves her to be found by Franz, who threatens her into luring Marlina back to the house. The three meet at the house, and Novi's water breaks. She considers killing Franz, but takes pity on him. Franz reunites the head of Markus with his corpse and places him beside Marlina's mummified husband. While Novi cooks chicken soup for him under duress, he rapes Marlina and Novi decapitates him. She then gives birth. Marlina and Novi leave the house in the morning together with the child.

== Cast ==
- Marsha Timothy as Marlina, a recently widowed woman
- Dea Panendra as Novi, a pregnant young woman
- Egi Fedly as Markus, a local thug
- Yoga Pratama as Frans, a local thug
- Indra Birowo as Umbu, Novi's husband
- Yayu Unru as Raja
- Tumpal Tampubolon as Marlina's deceased husband

== Production ==
=== Development ===
While serving in the jury panel of the 34th Citra Awards in 2014, Garin Nugroho approached Surya at a screening with the story treatment he had for the film. Nugroho felt that the film would be better in the hands of a woman director due to its subject matter and because he felt like he had nothing new to add to it.

According to Nugroho, the basic premise of the story is inspired by true events he witnessed firsthand while visiting Sumba in 1986 and 2004. Surya's collaborator and husband Rama Adi was immediately attracted to the story, but Surya took some time to figure out how she would make the film, as the rural setting is a departure from the urban settings of Jakarta she used in Fiksi. and What They Don't Talk About When They Talk About Love.

The film was co-produced by studios from different countries: Surya's own Cinesurya, Kaninga Pictures and Purin Pictures (Thailand), Sasha & Co Production (France), Astro Shaw (Malaysia), and HOOQ (Singapore).

=== Filming ===
The film was shot in late 2016 with exterior shots taken on location in Sumba, East Nusa Tenggara and interior shots on a set built by the film's crew in Jakarta. The cast spent two months studying native Sumba language.

Surya acknowledged that she was inspired by the Western film genre and found inspiration from Google Images of Sumba island during the dry season, which resembles the typical background of a Western film.

== Release ==
The film made history as only the fourth Indonesian film ever to make the official selection of Cannes Film Festival following Eros Djarot's Tjoet Nja' Dhien and Garin Nugroho's Leaf on a Pillow in 1998 as well as Nugroho's Serambi in 2006. It competed in the Directors' Fortnight section, but lost to Chloé Zhao's The Rider.

Following an early festival run that included the Toronto International Film Festival, AFI Fest, and Golden Horse Film Festival, Marlina the Murderer in Four Acts was released theatrically in Indonesia on 16 November 2017. The following year, it was also shown in theaters in some other countries, including Germany, Italy, the Netherlands, Malaysia, Greece, Japan, and the United States.

== Reception ==
=== Box office ===
By the end of its domestic theatrical run, Marlina the Murderer in Four Acts recorded 154 thousand admissions, making it Surya's most commercially successful project to date. In the United States, the film grossed $17,788 for an estimated worldwide total of $26,331.

=== Critical response ===
On review aggregator website Rotten Tomatoes, the film holds an approval rating of 98% from 44 reviews. The website's critical consensus reads, "Subversive, gorgeously shot, and suitably visceral, Marlina the Murderer in Four Acts injects timely feminist themes into a neo-western grindhouse framework." On Metacritic, the film has a weighted average score of 77 out of 100 from 13 critics, indicating "generally favorable reviews".

Variety's Maggie Lee gave the film a glowing review, praising Surya's ability to "build nail-biting tension" and ending the film with a climax that "rivals any of [Quentin] Tarantino's high concept violence". Lee coined the term "satay Western" to describe the film's Western style but told from a female perspective while incorporating Indonesia's traditional values and setting. The term has since been used in multiple media coverage of the film. Gary Goldstein of the Los Angeles Times praised the film for "eschew[ing] excess gore and mayhem, largely making its points in more subtly incisive ways.

In a 3-star review, Godfrey Cheshire of RogerEbert.com singled out the film's "confident eloquence of the staging, framing and editing" and noted that "the story is essentially a revenge fantasy like many another, but its feminist slant never feels rhetorical or heavy-handed. The whole thing is handled with sly wit as well as unfailing stylistic smarts, which makes for a very satisfying package." Manohla Dargis of The New York Times called the film "an unwavering slow burn" and praised Surya who "smartly foregrounds all that comeliness and every so often folds in a long shot that turns the characters into doll-like figures, a downsizing that gestures toward a nature vs. culture dynamic." Writing for The Jakarta Post, Stanley Widianto called the film "one hell of a ride" while noting its inspired take on the "spaghetti western trope".

== See also ==
- List of submissions to the 91st Academy Awards for Best Foreign Language Film
- List of Indonesian submissions for the Academy Award for Best Foreign Language Film
