= Perkawinan =

1972 film by Wim Umboh

- Directed by: Wim Umboh
- Written by: Narto Erawan Dalimarta; Wim Umboh
- Produced by: Annie Mambo
- Starring: Widyawati; Sophan Sophiaan; Kusno Sudjarwadi; Dicky Zulkarnaen; Rahayu Effendi; Komalasari; Rd Mochtar; Yan Bastian; Emilia Contessa
- Cinematography: Lukman Hakim Nain
- Production companies: PT Aries Raya International; PT Far Eastern Film Co
- Release date: 1972
- Running time: 109 minutes
- Country: Indonesia
- Language: Indonesian language

Perkawinan is a 1972 Indonesian drama film directed by Wim Umboh. The film won nine awards at the Indonesian Film Festival in 1973.

== Awards ==
Venue	Year	Category	Recipient	Result
Indonesian Film Festival	1973	Best Feature Film		Won
Indonesian Film Festival	1973	Best Directing	Wim Umboh	Won
Indonesian Film Festival	1973	Best Camera	Lukman Hakim Nain	Won
Indonesian Film Festival	1973	Best Music	Idris Sardi	Won
Indonesian Film Festival	1973	Best Sound	Suparman Sidik	Won
Indonesian Film Festival	1973	Best Art Direction	Gaby Mambo	Won
Indonesian Film Festival	1973	Best Screenplay	Narto Erawan Dalimarta, Wim Umboh	Won
Indonesian Film Festival	1973	Best Editing	Wim Umboh, K Uraoka	Won
Indonesian Film Festival	1973	Second Leading Man	Sophan Sophiaan	Won
Indonesian Journalists Association's Best Actor/Actress Awards	1973	Best Actor	Kusno Sudjarwadi	Won
Indonesian Journalists Association's Best Actor/Actress Awards	1973	Best Actress	Widyawati	Won

== Synopsis ==
Mr. Tok (Sophan Sophiaan) is the son of a wealthy nobleman who is studying in the Netherlands and meets Inge (Widyawati), an employee at the Nitour travel agency. After they get married, they are unable to have a child due to Mr. Tok's illness. After returning to Indonesia, this couple is disliked by Mr. Tok's parents, who have arranged his marriage with another girl. Fortunately, the girl already has a girlfriend, so the forced marriage is not carried out. Mr. Tok then returns to Europe to cure his illness. During that time, Inge is thrown out by her in-laws because she is found pregnant and is considered to be having an affair. When Mr. Tok returns and does not find his wife, he blames his parents, because the baby is actually his child. In the snow, Mr. Tok meets Inge again, just like at the beginning of their meeting, this time witnessed by Mr. Tok's parents.
