= Untuk Angeline =

- Directed by: Jito Banyu
- Written by: Lele Leila Nurazizah
- Produced by: Duke Rachmat, Niken Septikasari
- Starring: Kinaryosih; Naomi Ivo; Teuku Rifnu Wikana; Roweina Umboh
- Music by: Joseph S. Djafar
- Production company: Citra Visual Sinema
- Release date: 2016
- Running time: 101 minutes
- Country: Indonesia
- Language: Indonesia

Untuk Angeline (English: For Angeline) is an Indonesian tragedy drama film released on July 21, 2016, and directed by Jito Banyu. The film is based on real story Engeline murder.

== Cast ==
- Kinaryosih as Samidah
- Naomi Ivo as Angeline
- Teuku Rifnu Wikana as Santo
- Roweina Umboh as Terry
- Paramitha Rusady as Mrs. Dewi
- Hans de Kraker as John
- Audrey Junicka as young Angeline
- Dewangga Yudantara as Kevin
- Rey Bong as young Kevin
- Vonny Anggraeni as Ni Luh
- Ratna Riantiarno as Chief Judge
- Dewi Hughes as Mrs. Kadek
- Asep Jaya as Anton
- Vennya Adisuryo as Intan
- Frilly Doeni as Kiara
- Marsya Doeni as Tari
- Niken Septikasari as Kiara's mother
- Nanda as Dinda
- Nina Octavia as nurse
- Prastopo as Jury
- Iran as Jury
- Agung Nugoroho as lawyer
- Marianto Samosir as lawyer
- Yan Widjaya as attorney
- Anoki as police
- Iqbal Perdana as attorney
- Hari as police
- Yulius Pasha as police
- Bella as Nia
- Bintang as Chacha
- Emma Waroka
