= The Tarix Jabrix 2 =

2009 comedy drama film by Iqbal Rais

- Theatrical release poster
- Directed by: Iqbal Rais
- Written by: Hilman Mutasi; Benny Ahmad; Sofyan Jambul
- Produced by: Chand Parwez Servia
- Starring: The Changcuters; Joanna Alexandra; Ramon Y. Tungka; Judika; Duma Riris Silalahi
- Cinematography: Tono Wisnu
- Edited by: Cesa David Luckmansyah
- Music by: Candil
- Production company: Kharisma Starvision Plus
- Release date: July 2, 2009
- Running time: 99 minutes
- Country: Indonesia
- Language: Indonesian

The Tarix Jabrix 2 is a 2009 Indonesian comedy film directed by Iqbal Rais and the sequel to the 2008 film The Tarix Jabrix, both of which star The Changcuters band as the title gang. The film is produced by Chand Parwez Servia with Hanung Bramantyo as a co-producer. It was released theatrically on July 2, 2009, and the soundtrack was nominated at the Indonesian Movie Awards and Balinale. The Tarix Jabrix 2 was a box office success, selling 581,610 tickets and was included in the 10 best-selling 2009 films in Indonesia. It has sequel The Tarix Jabrix 3.

== Synopsis ==
The Tarix Jabrix Gang has graduated from high school. Cacing suggests that the group move to Jakarta to live and study together. At first, the Tarix Jabrix Gang is excited to experience the thrill of life in Jakarta. However, the reality of the city soon makes them uneasy. Following Cacing’s idea, they sell their motorbikes and buy a car. When they start driving to campus, their confidence increases slightly.

Ciko and Coki develop romantic crushes, and so does Cacing. Their new social circle draws them into a typical big-city problem: a kidnapping case. At the same time, they also face internal conflict when Mulder becomes involved in illegal street racing with rival competitors.

== Cast ==
- Tria Changcut as Cacing
- Qibil Changcut as Coki
- Alda Changcut as Ciko
- Dipa Changcut as Mulder
- Erick Changcut as Dadang
- Joanna Alexandra as Milinka/Adelia
- Winda Agustina Putri as Tra-Lala
- Windi Agustina Putri as Tra-Lili
- Ramon Y. Tungka as Valent
- Judika as Bruno
- Duma Riris Silalahi as Sarah
- Umay Shahab as DonaDoni
- Chantiq Schagerl as Alanis
- Cecep Reza as Boni
- Sellen Fernandez as Dadang's Father
- Epy Kusnandar as Mr. Yadi
- Carissa Puteri as Calista
- Adri Surono as himself
- Desta Club 80's as Motorcycle Buyer
- Hanung Bramantyo as Angry Man
- Iqbal Rais as Beaten Man
- Soraya Larasati as Beauty Girl in Clas
- Ence Bagus as Gorengan Seller

== Accolades ==
| Award | Year | Category | Recipient(s) | Result | Ref. |
|---|---|---|---|---|---|
| Indonesian Movie Awards | 2009 | Best Soundtrack | The Tarix Jabrix | Nominated | |
| Balinale | 2009 | Best Soundtrack | The Tarix Jabrix | Nominated | |
