= Epy Kusnandar =

Indonesian actor and comedian (1964–2025)

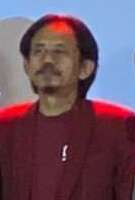
- Epy in 2023
- Born: May 1, 1964; Garut, West Java, Indonesia
- Died: December 3, 2025 (aged 61); East Jakarta, Indonesia
- Education: Jakarta Arts Institute
- Occupations: Actor; singer; comedian
- Years active: 1996–2025
- Known for: Kang Mus on Preman Pensiun
- Spouse: Karina Ranau (m. 2008)
- Children: 3

Epy Kusnandar (May 1, 1964 – December 3, 2025) was an Indonesian actor, singer, and comedian.

== Early life and education ==
Epy was born on May 1, 1964. He was active in theater from middle school. After graduating from Senior High School in 1983, Epy continued his studies in the Jakarta Arts Institute in 1989.

== Career ==
Epy started his career in the entertainment industry with acting on the television series 1 Kakak 7 Ponakan in 1996.

== Personal life ==
Epy was married and had two children, Qodrat Pratama Putra in 1990 and Damar Rizal Marzuki in 1992. Damar was a lecturer at the Jakarta Arts Institute who entered the world of acting by playing the role of Suparman in the television series Suparman Reborn in 2022. In an interview in 2009, Epy admitted to being abandoned by his ex-wife.

On July 27, 2008, Epy married Karina Ranau, also an actress. This marriage was registered with the Palembang Religious Affairs Office. They had one child, Quentin Stanislavski Kusnandar, in 2009. In 2013, Epy reportedly sued Karina for divorce through SMS. However, after that there was no more news about the divorce process, and their household seemed to be fine.

On October 18, 2025, through an Instagram post, the food stall owned by Epy Kusnandar and his wife, Karina Ranau, experienced acts of thuggery or Premanisme even though the stall had only been operating since October 2, 2025. However, on October 20, the local police chief and neighborhood association confirmed that the incident was merely a misunderstanding.

=== Death ===
Epy died due to a brainstem stroke on December 3, 2025, at 14.24 WIB, at the National Brain Center Hospital, Cawang, East Jakarta. He was 61. His body was laid out at the funeral home on Jalan Pasir, Ciganjur, South Jakarta, and was buried the next day, at 08.00 WIB at Jeruk Purut Cemetery.

== Filmography ==
=== Films ===
Years	Titles	Roles	Notes
1983	7 Wanita dalam Tugas Rahasia		
1984	Akibat Buah Terlarang		
2000	Petualangan Sherina	Upay	
2006	Maskot	Sapari	
2006	I Love You, Om	Sopir bajaj	
2007	Kamulah Satu-Satunya	Darlam	
2007	Get Married	Penghulu	
2007	Film Horor	Pramubakti kampus	
2008	The Tarix Jabrix	Pak Yadi	
2008	Tri Mas Getir	Om Syafei	
2008	Suami-Suami Takut Istri the Movie	Dadang	
2008	Mupeng	Sopir	
2008	Si Jago Merah	Sugihan	
2008	Takut: Faces of Fear	Bambang	Segmen: "Peeper"
2009	Romeo Juliet	Soleh Solihun	
2009	Janda Kembang	Pak RT	
2009	Benci Disko	Noer	
2009	The Tarix Jabrix 2	Pak Yadi	
2009	Paku Kuntilanak		
2009	Maling Kutang	Suami	
2009	XXL-Double Extra Large	Daud	
2010	Seleb Kota Jogja (SKJ)	Satpam	
2010	3 Hati Dua Dunia, Satu Cinta	Pak RT	
2010	Penganten Sunat	Kepra	
2010	Kabayan Jadi Milyuner	Pemimpin demo	Juga sebagai pelatih akting
2011	Suster Keramas 2	Pria yang berereksi	
2012	Mama Minta Pulsa		
2012	Brandal-Brandal Ciliwung	Bang Epy	
2012	I Love You Masbro	Notaris	
2013	The ABCs of Death	Pria di panggung 13	Segment: "L is for Libido"
2013	Operation Wedding	Penghulu	
2013	Tampan Tailor		
2013	Bangun Lagi Dong Lupus	Sopir Poppie	
2013	9 Summers 10 Autumns	Bang Udin	
2013	V/H/S/2	Bapak	Segment: "Safe Haven"
2013	Get M4rried	Penghulu	
2013	Slank Nggak Ada Matinya	Ayah Putri	
2014	Killers	Robert	
2014	The Raid 2: Berandal	Topan	
2014	Kamar 207	Pak Rebo	
2014	Hijrah Cinta	Tukang ojek	
2014	Mengejar Malam Pertama	Sarkun	
2014	Aku, Kau & KUA	Penghulu	
2014	Salah Bodi	Pramubakti	
2015	Bali Big Brother		Japanese film
2015	Love and Faith	Junaidi	
2015	Hijab	Kang Epy	
2015	Relationshit	Bapak tua	
2015	Move On	Sopir taksi	
2016	Ketika Mas Gagah Pergi	Kepala preman	
2016	Ada Cinta di SMA	Pak Oding	
2016	Headshot	Romli	
2017	Jomblo: Sebuah Komedi Cinta	Penjual cuanki	
2017	Duka Sedalam Cinta	Bang Urip	
2017	Mata Batin	Kang Asep	
2018	Partikelir	Ngatimin	
2018	Love Reborn: Komik, Musik & Kisah Masa Lalu	Montir	
2018	The Night Comes for Us	Pria buta	Adegan dihapus
2018	Message Man	Montir	An Indonesia-Australia Collaboration Film
2019	Preman Pensiun: The Movie	Muslihat	
2019	Rumah Kentang: The Beginning	Dadang	
2019	Bike Boyz	—N/a	Pelatih akting
2021	Teachers	Glen	
2022	Keluarga Cemara 2	Mang Ujang	
2022	Madu Murni	Bos	
2022	Crazy, Stupid, Love	Allay	
2023	Perjamuan Iblis	Pak Arya	
2024	Pasar Setan	Abah Agung	
2024	Mukidi	Martokapiran	
2024	Tumbal Darah	Tabib	
2025	Selepas Tahlil	Hadi	
2025	Qorin 2 †	Pak Guntur	
2025	Janur Ireng †	Anggodo	
TBA	The Tiger †		
TBA	Patriot: Selamatkan Indonesia †	Abu Kusmayadi	
TBA	Juang †		

Key
†	Denotes films that have not yet been released

- TBA : To be announced

=== Short films ===
Years	Titles	Roles	Notes
2001	Be Careful at Night!	Sopir taksi	
2016	Teater Tanpa Kata: Sena Didi Mime	Narasumber	Dokumenter
2022	Anita Pho Lee and Ri		

=== Television series ===
Years	Titles	Roles	Notes
1996	1 Kakak 7 Ponakan	Gun	
2004	Asyiknya Geng Hijau		
2004	Tante Tuti	Parjono / Jon	
	Bajaj Bajuri	Teman Bajuri	1 episode
2005—2006	Kejar Kusnadi	Kusnadi	
2007—2010	Suami-Suami Takut Istri	Dadang	
2009	Safa dan Marwah	Kadir	
2010	The Adventures of Suparman	Suparman	
2010	Mister Olga	Tukang kredit	
2011	Baim Jaim	Epy	
2011	Kampung Hawa	Ubay	
2011	Aliya	Pram	
2013	Si Cemong	Dul Solar	
2013—2014	Get Married the Series 2	Penghulu	
2014	Para Pencari Tuhan Jilid 8	Tukang bubur	
2014	Stasiun Cinta	Wibowo / Mas Wowow	
2015—2022	Preman Pensiun	Muslihat	7 musim
2016	Candra Kirana	Tabib	
2016	Nongkrong di Warung Kopi	Penjual warung	
2017	Pangeran 2		
2017	Rohaya & Anwar: Kecil-Kecil Jadi Manten	Pak RW	
2019	Tamu Tak Diundang	Rizal	
2022	Suparman Reborn	Ayat	
2023	Amanah Wali 7: Menukar Takdir	Pak Eep	

=== Web series ===
Years	Titles	Roles	Notes
2019—2020	Percaya Ini Rindu	Ayah Anya	

=== Television films ===
- Sendal Bolong untuk Hamdani (2004)
- X-tra Heboh: Turun Ranjang 3X
- The Adventures of Suparman: Pulang Kampung (2010)
- The Adventures of Suparman: Sang Pahlawan (2010)
- Sinema Wajah Indonesia: Maaf, Lebaran Ini Kami Tidak Pulang (2012)
- Sinema Wajah Indonesia: Keluarga Kambing (2012)
- Sinema Wajah Indonesia: Miskin Susah, Kaya Susah (2013)
- Azab Tukang Gorengan Serakah (2014)
- Cermin Kehidupan: Mimpi Naik Haji Pedagang Kambing (2014)
- Preman Pensiun: Sang Juara (2015)
- Kisah Nyata: Tukang Gali Kubur Naik Haji (2017)
- Preman Pensiun: Kesempatan Kedua (2020)
- Preman Pensiun: Kembali ke Fitri (2021)
- Preman Pensiun: Manusia Merdeka (2021)
- Preman Pensiun: Menunggu Senja (2022)

=== Theater ===
- Khatulistiwa (2016)
- Vergo (2018)

== Discography ==
=== Singles ===
- "Bukan Manusia Baja" (2010) — theme song of The Adventures of Suparman
- "Cinta yang Terluka" (2013, featuring Karina Ranau)

== Awards and nominations ==
Years	Awards	Categories	Works of nominations	Results
2012	Festival Film Indonesia	Pemeran Pendukung Pria FTV Terbaik	Maaf, Lebaran Ini Kami Tidak Pulang	Won
2014	Festival Film Indonesia	Pemeran Utama Pria FTV Terbaik	Miskin Susah, Kaya Susah	Won
