= Fiksi. =

2008 Indonesian thriller film

Fiction.
- Poster
- Fiksi.
- Directed by: Mouly Surya
- Screenplay by: Mouly Surya; Joko Anwar
- Story by: Mouly Surya
- Produced by: Rama Adi; Parama Wirasmo; Tia Hasibuan; Sapto Soetarjo
- Starring: Ladya Cheryl; Donny Alamsyah; Kinaryosih
- Cinematography: Yunus Pasolang
- Edited by: Muhammad Ichsan
- Music by: Zeke Khaseli
- Production company: Cinesurya
- Distributed by: Cinesurya
- Release date: 19 June 2008 (Indonesia)
- Running time: 110 minutes
- Country: Indonesia
- Language: Indonesian

Fiksi. (sometimes stylized as fiksi.; English: Fiction) is a 2008 Indonesian thriller film and the directorial debut of Mouly Surya. The film follows Alisha, a young woman who leaves her family mansion and moves into a modest apartment, where she encounters eccentric neighbours whose stories she gradually weaves into her obsessive fantasies. Surya has described Fiksi. as an "adult re-invention" of Alice in Wonderland, with the character of Alisha presented as an inverted version of Alice.

The film stars Ladya Cheryl as Alisha, a performance for which she received a nomination for Best Actress at the 28th Citra Awards. Surya won the Citra Award for Best Director, becoming the first—and, as of 2020, the only—woman to receive the award.

== Synopsis ==
Alisha (Ladya Cheryl) feels uncomfortable in her spacious, modern home. One day, she meets Bari (Donny Alamsyah), who introduces her to the experience of love.

== Cast ==
- Ladya Cheryl as Alisha, a young woman who moves into a low-cost apartment and becomes neighbours with Bari and Renta
- Donny Alamsyah as Bari, Renta's long-term boyfriend of seven years, with whom Alisha develops an obsession after seeing him clean the pool at her family mansion
- Kinaryosih as Renta, Bari's girlfriend of seven years and a psychology student
- Soultan Saladin as Alisha's wealthy father
- Rina Hasyim as Tuti, the housekeeper at Alisha's family mansion
- Egy Fedly as Bambang, Alisha's personal chauffeur and bodyguard
- Inong as Alisha's mother, who died by suicide when Alisha was young
- Aty Cancer as Dirah, a resident of the apartment building who keeps numerous cats and has a traumatic past
- José Rizal Manua as an elderly man who has never entered his apartment unit and who formerly owned the land on which the apartment building stands

== Production ==
Surya met her future husband and collaborator Rama Adi while working as an assistant director on Rako Prijanto's 2007 films D'Bijis and Love Is Red. In 2007, they co-founded the film production company Cinesurya and secured funding to produce Fiksi., based on a screenplay developed by Surya.

The pair sought advice from established filmmaker Riri Riza on producing their first feature film. He recommended collaborating with more experienced practitioners during the development process, which led them to work with producer Tia Hasibuan and writer-director Joko Anwar. Anwar spent approximately one month revising Surya's draft and was subsequently credited as a co-writer.

In March 2020, a behind-the-scenes film directed by then lesser-known filmmakers Yosep Anggi Noen and B. W. Purbanegara was released on Cinesurya's YouTube channel.

== Release ==
Fiksi. was released theatrically in Indonesia on June 19, 2008. The film was subsequently screened at the Busan International Film Festival and the Jakarta International Film Festival in 2008, as well as at the Asiexpo Lyon Asian Film Festival in 2011 and the Tokyo International Film Festival in 2016.

== Reception ==
Film critic Eric Sasono wrote that Surya's direction "almost fails to deliver" because of what he described as a lack of plausibility in the story, but he also praised the film for venturing "out of the comfort zone" of mainstream Indonesian cinema. Similarly, Maggie Lee of The Hollywood Reporter criticised the film's "jumbled" time sequences and laid-back pacing, while praising its "overlapping plots", which she described as "weirdly fascinating in their own right".

Richard Kuipers of Variety offered a more positive assessment, describing the film as "an intriguing web around a lonely rich girl's obsession with a handsome writer" and praising Surya's direction as "briskly paced" with "well-drawn characters".

== Awards and nominations ==
Year	Award	Category	Recipient	Result
2008	Jakarta International Film Festival	Best Director	Mouly Surya	Won
2008	Jogja-NETPAC Asian Film Festival	Golden Hanoman Award	Mouly Surya	Nominated
2008	28th Citra Awards	Best Picture	Fiksi.	Won
2008	28th Citra Awards	Best Director	Mouly Surya	Won
2008	28th Citra Awards	Best Actor	Donny Alamsyah	Nominated
2008	28th Citra Awards	Best Actress	Ladya Cheryl	Nominated
2008	28th Citra Awards	Best Screenplay	Mouly Surya; Joko Anwar	Won
2008	28th Citra Awards	Best Cinematography	Yunus Pasolang	Nominated
2008	28th Citra Awards	Best Editing	Muhammad Ichsan	Nominated
2008	28th Citra Awards	Best Art Direction	Eros Eflin	Nominated
2008	28th Citra Awards	Best Original Score	Zeke Khaseli	Won
2008	28th Citra Awards	Best Sound	Yusuf A. Patawari Aufa Rahmat Triangga Ariaputra	Nominated
2009	3rd Indonesian Movie Awards	Best Actress	Ladya Cheryl	Nominated
2009	3rd Indonesian Movie Awards	Best Supporting Actress	Kinaryosih	Nominated
2009	3rd Indonesian Movie Awards	Favorite Film	Fiksi.	Nominated
2009	3rd Indonesian Movie Awards	Favorite Actress	Ladya Cheryl	Nominated
2009	3rd Indonesian Movie Awards	Favorite Supporting Actress	Kinaryosih	Nominated
