= Perempuan Berkalung Sorban =

- Directed by: Hanung Bramantyo
- Screenplay by: Gina S. Noer; Hanung Bramantyo
- Based on: Perempuan Berkalung Sorban by Abidah El Khaliqy
- Produced by: Chand Parwez Servia
- Starring: Revalina S. Temat; Oka Antara; Reza Rahadian; Widyawati
- Cinematography: Faozan Rizal
- Edited by: Wawan I. Wibowo
- Music by: Tya Subiakto Satrio
- Production company: Starvision Plus
- Distributed by: Starvision Plus
- Release date: January 15, 2009
- Running time: 131 minutes
- Country: Indonesia
- Language: Indonesia
- Budget: -

Perempuan Berkalung Sorban, released internationally as Woman with a Turban, is a 2009 Indonesian religious drama film, written by Gina S. Noer and Hanung Bramantyo and directed by Hanung Bramantyo, and stars Revalina S. Temat, Reza Rahadian, Oka Antara and Widyawati. This film was released on January 15, 2009, and was produced by Starvision Plus. Based on the novel by Abidah El Khalieqy, telling about Anissa, a Muslim woman, always understanding of a situation in her life, men are always positioned higher than women in any aspect of life. Anissa wanted men and women to be equal in gender. Anissa thinks that in Muslim culture, the man is greater than the woman. And the ending, Anissa knows one thing that her wrongs had a special 'chair' in Muslims.

== Plot ==
Anissa (Revalina S. Temat) comes from patriarchal society revolving around kyais (religious leaders) and religious boarding schools. From childhood, Anissa has always been treated unfairly due to her gender. The only person who treats her right is her uncle, Khudori, who encourages her and shows her that there is a different world outside where men are not viewed as superior and women are treated more equally. Anissa’s love for Khudori (Oka Antara), her uncle, went unanswered as Khudori is still closely related to her family, despite not being a blood relative. Khudori represses his feelings and goes to Cairo to continue his education.

Khudori has always encouraged Anissa to continue her studies; however, Anissa’s father refuses, instead marrying her off to Samsudin (Reza Rahadian). As her world falls apart, Anissa finds out that Khudori has returned from Cairo. Khudori cannot do more than embrace and comfort her, just like any uncle to a niece. Unfortunately, Samsudin finds them together, a slander that changes everything. The incident causes the death of Anissa’s father.

After continuing her education, she finds that life outside a religious boarding school has helped broaden her horizons. Eventually, her path crosses again with Khudori. This time, they decide to marry, even though their marriage takes them farther from their families. In the end, Anissa realises that asking for forgiveness is not a sign that she has done something wrong. In asking for forgiveness, Anissa promises that she will always endeavour to be a good Muslim woman, just like what her father and mother would have wanted.

== Festivals ==
- Film selected in the “ Cinema of the World “ Section of the 40th edition of the International Film Festival of India (IFFI) to be held in Goa, 23 November- 3 December 2009
- Movie References (2009) in Gajah Mada University (Strategy Marketing) & University Islam Negri (Questions and Answers covering the movie)
- Screening to the French Audience in Lyon, France for the South-east Asian Cinema Panorama of the Asian Connection Film Festival 2011 - date 19 - 23 Oct 2011

== Cast ==
- Revalina S. Temat
- Oka Antara
- Reza Rahadian
- Francine Roosenda
- Widyawati
- Eron Lebang
- Frans Nicholas
- Tika Putri
- Risty Tagor
- Joshua Pandelaki
- Leroy Osmani
- Cici Tegal
- Ida Leman
- Berliana Febrianty
- Pangky Suwito
- Piet Pagau
- Nasya Abigail
- Aditya Arif
- Haikal Kamil

== Awards ==
2009 Indonesian Movie Awards

- Best Supporting Actress : Nasya Abigail
- Best Favourite Leading Actress : Revalina S. Temat

Film Festival Bandung 2009

- Best Actress : Revalina S. Temat
- Best Supporting Actress : Widyawati
- Best Best Cinematography : Faozan Rizal
