= Love (2008 Indonesian film) =

- Directed by: Kabir Bhatia
- Written by: Titien Wattimena
- Produced by: Manoj Samtani
- Starring: Laudya Cynthia Bella; Irwansyah; Fauzi Baadilla; Acha Septriasa; Darius Sinathrya; Luna Maya; Sophan Sophiaan; Surya Saputra; Widyawati; Wulan Guritno; Ajeng Sardi; Aryo Wahab; Gading Marten; Marsha Aruan; Linda Ramadhanty; Nur Saptahadi; Al Fathir Muchtar; Marsha Timothy; Joko Anwar
- Cinematography: Eddy Michael S.
- Music by: Erwin Gutawa
- Production company: The Nature Producers
- Distributed by: 13 Entertainment
- Release date: 14 February 2008
- Running time: 120 minutes
- Country: Indonesia
- Language: Indonesian

Love is a 2008 Indonesian anthology romance film directed by Kabir Bhatia as a remake of the 2006 film Cinta. The film marked the last appearance of actor Sophan Sophiaan before his death in 2008. Sophiaan appeared opposite his real-life wife, Widyawati.

== Plot ==
With Jakarta as the background, the film shares the stories of 5 different couples of various ages, social, and economic groups.

== Background ==
The project began filming in 2007, and was at first accused of being a copy of the 2003 British romantic comedy film Love Actually. Writer Titien Wattimena denied that it was a copy, and Christo Damar of 'The Nature Producers' stated that while Love began with the same basic precept, it was actually based upon the 2006 film Cinta, with perhaps a 10% similarity to its predecessor, and 90% being a different story as now set in Jakarta. The composer Erwin Gutawa contributed to the film.

== Cast ==
- Laudya Cynthia Bella as Dinda
- Irwansyah as Restu
- Acha Septriasa as Iin
- Darius Sinathriya as Awin
- Fauzi Baadilla as Rama
- Luna Maya as Tere
- Sophan Sophiaan as Nugroho
- Surya Saputra as Gilang
- Widyawati as Lestari
- Wulan Guritno as Miranda
- Ajeng Sardi as Dewi
- Aryo Wahab as Rio
- Gading Marten as Arif
- Marsha Aruan as Icha
- Linda Ramadhanty as Ayu
- Nur Saptahadi as Chandra
- Al Fathir Muchtar as Omar
- Marsha Timothy as Tia
- Joko Anwar as Arya

== Awards and nominations ==
This movie won "Movie of the Year" at the Guardians e-Awards and was nominated for "Favorite Film" at the Indonesian Movie Awards.

Year	Awards	Category	Recipients	Results
2008	Guardians e-Awards	Movie of the Year	Love	Won
2008	Guardians e-Awards	Best Leading Actor	Surya Saputra	Won
2008	Guardians e-Awards	Best Leading Actress	Acha Septriasa	Won
2008	Guardians e-Awards	Best Supporting Actor	Sophan Sophiaan	Won
2008	Guardians e-Awards	Best Cinematography	Eddy Michael Santoso	Won
2008	Guardians e-Awards	Best Editing	Kabir Bhatia & Johan Bahar	Won
2009	Indonesian Movie Awards	Favorite Film	Love	Nominated
2009	Indonesian Movie Awards	Best Actor	Sophan Sophiaan	Nominated
2009	Indonesian Movie Awards	Best Actress	Widyawati	Nominated
2009	Indonesian Movie Awards	Favorite Actor	Sophan Sophiaan	Won
2009	Indonesian Movie Awards	Favorite Actress	Widyawati	Nominated
2009	Indonesian Movie Awards	Favorite Soundtrack	Gita Gutawa – "Sempurna" (Love)	Nominated

== Album ==
Ost. Love

Studio album by Complication
- Released: 2008
- Recorded: 2008
- Genre: Pop
- Label: Sony BMG Music Entertainment Indonesia

Ost. Love is a compilation album released in 2008 to accompany the film of the same title, Love. The soundtrack album has 9 songs. The hit song single Sempurna sung by Andra and The BackBone was a recycled song by Gita Gutawa.

=== List Song ===
1. Sempurna (second version) - Gita Gutawa
2. Anugerah Terindah Yang Pernah Ku Miliki - Sheila On 7
3. Oo..Oo..Oo.. - Gigi
4. Kasih Tak Sampai - Padi
5. Scoring Love 2 - Erwin Gutawa
6. Dua Hati Menjadi Satu - Gita Gutawa feat Dafi
7. Ku Ingin Engkau - Vagetoz
8. Sempurna (first version) - Gita Gutawa
9. Scoring Love 1 - Gita Gutawa

== Reception ==
Iskandar Liem of the Jakarta Post wrote that the film might have seemed to simply be a remake of the earlier Cinta, using notable stars as a means of attracting money at the box office, but offered that "despite its flaws, [the film] proves to be an emotional reflection on affairs of the heart. Speaking toward the work of Sophan Sophiaan in the film, Liem wrote it was "refreshing to see senior thespian Sophan venturing outside his usual stern patriarchal roles with his touching portrayal of vulnerability." He acknowledged the work of Widyawati, Sophiaan's real-life wife, in her role as Lestari, writing "her character's generosity of spirit genuinely glows from her". He shared that of the cast, the work of Acha Septriasa was a "standout performance", writing "her performance is so fluid and organic, it's hard to believe this is the same grating actress who shamelessly turned on the waterworks in Love is Cinta". Liem concluded his review by summarizing "In spite of its flaws, Love still gave this jaded viewer a warm fuzzy feeling all over as the credits rolled".
