= Leonardo Ringo =

Indonesian radio expert (born 1977)

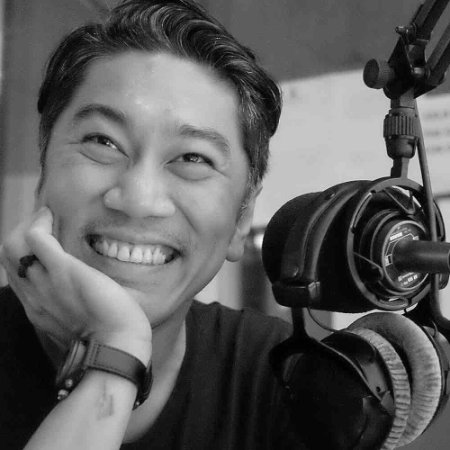
Leonardo Ringo has been an announcer at 103.8FM Brava Radio since 2010.

Leonardo Ringo (born 5 August 1977) is an Indonesian radio announcer, songwriter, singer and music video director. He has worked in Indonesia's radio industry for more than two decades.

Since 2010, Ringo has been employed by Brava Radio, an Indonesian jazz and soul radio station. In 2014, his band 'Leonardo and his Impeccable Six' released their CD Built to Race. Since 2003, Ringo has also been a member of Zeke and the Popo, an Indonesian ambient/ folk rock/ psychedelic band from Jakarta. Their song Mighty Love, was featured on the soundtrack of Janji Joni, a movie by director Joko Anwar.

In 2019 his song Wondrous Sky from his first solo album The Sun featured on the trailer and soundtrack of the mini series Nanti Kita Cerita Tentang Hari Ini in lead up to the 2020 awaited movie, directed by Angga Dwimas Sasongko.
