= Linda Ramadhanty =

Indonesian actor (born 1978)

Linda Ramadhanty (born August 15, 1978) is an Indonesian actress and model, known in Indonesia for her soap opera appearances, notably in My Love (2004), and later as Safina in Namaku Safina. She is also known for her performances in films such as Cinta Silver (2005) and Love (2008).

Ramadhanty began her career by winning first prize in the annual modelling competition run by Indonesian magazine Femina. She won the 1996 contest to become "Femina Face", but her modelling career was put on hold when she married in 2001. As a result of her first, short marriage, she has one daughter, Attayya Kaysa. Two months after the baby's birth, the couple separated.

Ramadhanty married Indonesian actor Arie Dwi Andhika, who was six years her junior, in 2009; they divorced in November 2017 and in 2018 Andhika would marry another Indonesian actress, Ardina Rasti.

Ramadhanty has publicised the fact that she has asthma.
