= Blind Pig Who Wants to Fly =

2008 Indonesian drama film

- Babi Buta yang Ingin Terbang
- Directed by: Edwin
- Written by: Edwin
- Produced by: Edwin; Sidi Saleh; Meiske Taurisia
- Starring: Joko Anwar; Clarine Baharrizki; Ladya Cheryl
- Cinematography: Sidi Saleh
- Edited by: Herman Panca
- Music by: Bontel
- Production company: Babibutafilm
- Distributed by: Babibutafilm (Indonesia); Filmmuseum Distributie (Netherlands)
- Release date: October 3, 2008
- Country: Indonesia
- Language: Indonesian
- Budget: $ 250,000
- Box office: $ 344

Blind Pig Who Wants to Fly (Indonesian: Babi Buta yang Ingin Terbang) is a 2008 Indonesian drama film written, directed, and produced by Edwin. Starring fellow filmmaker Joko Anwar and Ladya Cheryl, it is Edwin's feature film debut after a string of critically acclaimed short films.

Renowned filmmakers Mira Lesmana and Riri Riza are credited as associate producers of the film alongside Kemal Arsjad.

== Synopsis ==
The experiences of a woman and the people around her, all with obsessive agendas of their own. A fragile but panoramic vision of a community that is not at ease with itself—and hopes that can never be truly fulfilled.

== Cast ==
- Joko Anwar as Yahya
- Ladya Cheryl as Linda
  - Clairine Baharrizki as young Linda
- Andhara Early as Salma
- Carlo Genta as Cahyono
- Pong Harjatmo as Halim
- Wicaksono as Helmi

== Release ==
The film was released domestically in Indonesia on 3 October 2008 and on 11 September 2009 in the United States. It had a successful festival run, winning awards at the Golden Horse Film Festival in Taiwan, the Three Continents Festival in France, the International Film Festival Rotterdam in the Netherlands, and the Singapore International Film Festival in Singapore.

== Reception ==
=== Box office ===
Despite positive critical response and multiple festival wins, he film did not perform well at the box office, only grossing $344 during its limited run.

=== Critical response ===
Writing for The New York Times, critic Mike Hale described the film as "a series of vignettes, practically blackouts, that jump back and forth in time", praising the direction and performances as well as depictions of gay characters, calling the sex scene "discreetly filmed but more matter of fact and funnier than anything in Hollywood’s recent spate of bromances". Hale went on to compare Edwin favorably to Thai film auteur Pen-ek Ratanaruang.

== Awards and nominations ==
Year	Award	Category	Recipients	Result
2008	Busan International Film Festival	New Currents Award	Edwin	Nominated
2008	Cinemanila International Film Festival	Best Film	Blind Pig Who Wants to Fly	Nominated
2009	Buenos Aires International Festival of Independent Cinema	Best Film	Blind Pig Who Wants to Fly	Nominated
2009	Golden Horse Film Festival and Awards	NETPAC Award	Edwin	Won
2009	Jogja-NETPAC Asian Film Festival	Golden Hanoman Award	Edwin	Nominated
2009	Nantes Three Continents Festival	Golden Montgolfiere	Edwin	Nominated
2009	Nantes Three Continents Festival	Silver Montgolfiere	Edwin	Won
2009	Nantes Three Continents Festival	Young Audience Award	Edwin	Won
2009	International Film Festival Rotterdam	Tiger Award	Edwin	Nominated
2009	International Film Festival Rotterdam	FIPRESCI Prize	Edwin	Won
2009	Singapore International Film Festival	NETPAC Award Special Mention	Edwin	Won
