= Paiso =

Paiso (born 1894, date of death unknown) was an Indonesian communist activist and political prisoner who was imprisoned by the Dutch in the Boven-Digoel concentration camp from 1927 to 1932. His son-in-law Manai Sophiaan (1915-2003) was an Indonesian diplomat and politician and his grandson Sophan Sophiaan (1944-2008) was an actor and politician.

== Biography ==
Little is known of Paiso's early life. He was Javanese and was born in 1894 in the Dutch East Indies; he probably had a basic Dutch-language education.

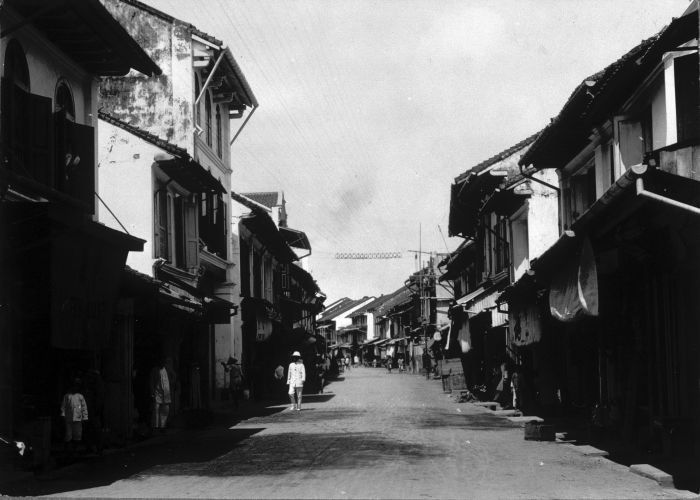
Street scene in Makassar, early 20th century

He worked as a civil servant in Merauke, as a writer for the Assistant Resident and later clerk for the Magistrate. By the mid-1920s, he was active in communist politics in Makassar, which at that time was in the Celebes and Dependencies Residency (today in South Sulawesi, Indonesia). In February 1924 he became secretary of a new branch of the People's Union (Indonesian: Sarekat Rakjat) in Makassar, an organization affiliated with the Communist Party of Indonesia (PKI). In 1924 his daughter Moenasiah was born. By 1925 he was also chairman of the local PKI branch, and also led a branch of the Islamic Communist Association (Indonesian: Perserikatan Komunis Islam). These activities soon led him to be targeted by authorities. The police arrested him at a ceremony marking the death of Sun Yat-sen in March 1925. The next year he was arrested under the Indies' strict censorship laws; in January 1926 he was sentenced to a year and a half in prison for speech infractions (Dutch: spreekdelicten). He was initially sent to the capital Batavia. Before he finished his sentence, in October 1927, authorities decided to exile him to Boven-Digoel concentration camp along with hundreds of other Communist Party members.

While interned in the camp, Paiso lived in Kampong C and was said to have supported himself by baking and selling bread. By the early 1930s, Digoel internees who were well-behaved and considered rehabilitated started to be released in large numbers. Paiso was allowed to return home with a group of 157, including Lie Eng Hok, in March 1932. He returned to Makassar and to politics after his release, although he was careful not to be re-arrested. During the Japanese occupation of the Dutch East Indies his daughter Moenasiah married a teacher named Manai Sophiaan, who would later become an Indonesian National Party politician.

After Indonesia became independent, the Communist Party was legalized and Paiso was able to operate more openly with the party once again. By the 1950s he was a key figure in the PKI's activities in South Sulawesi. He was involved in the Permesta rebellion, a cross-party regional movement centered in Makassar, for a time in early 1957 but formally withdrew his participation when it became increasingly anti-communist and anti-Sukarno.

He was still alive at the time of the banning of the PKI in 1965 and the Transition to the New Order, but it is unknown what happened to him.
