= Mouly Surya =

Indonesian director and screenwriter

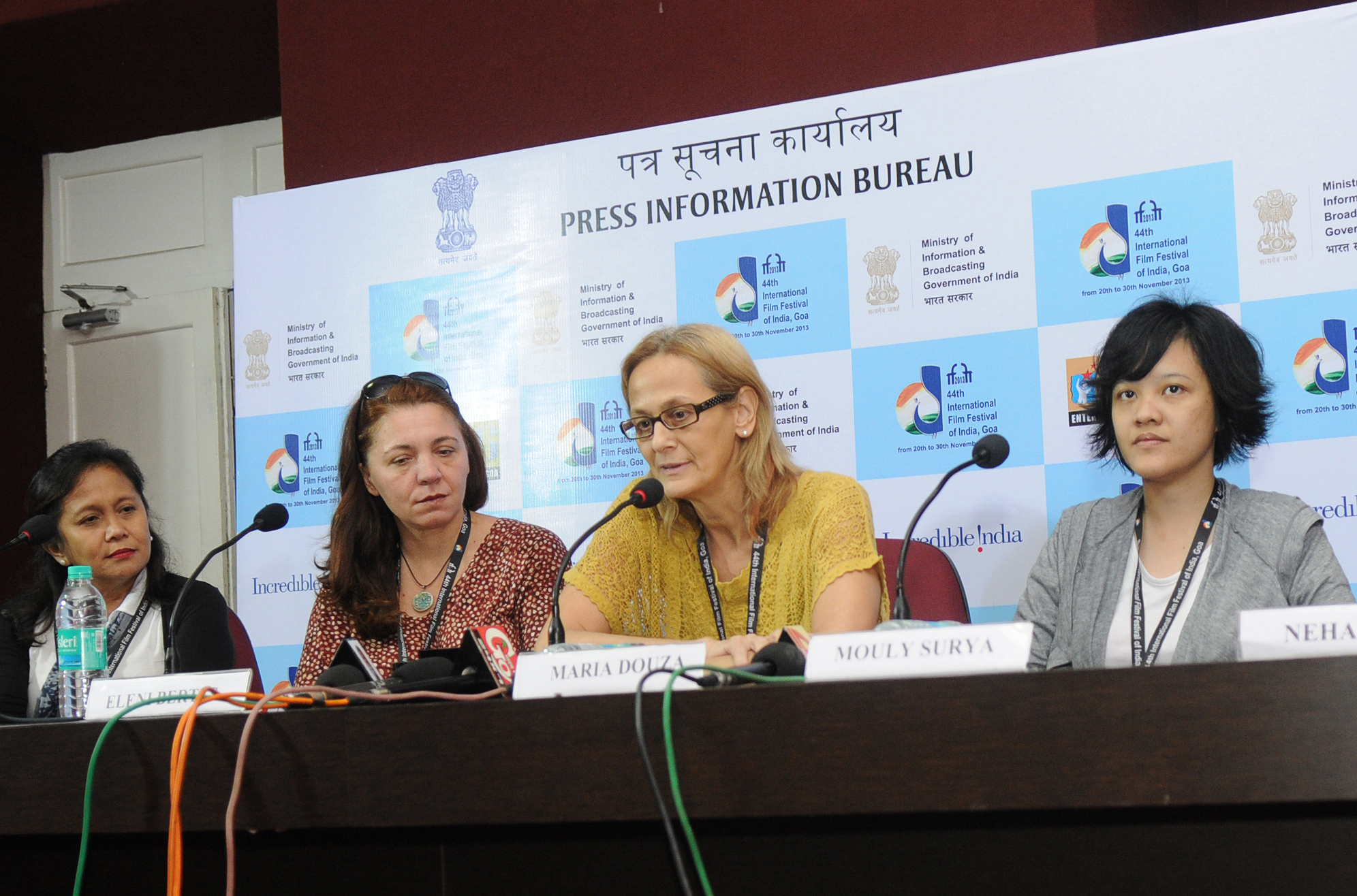
- Mouly Surya in 2013
- Born: Nursita Mouly Surya; 10 September 1980 (age 45); Jakarta, Indonesia
- Education: Media and Literature
- Alma mater: Bond University; Swinburne University
- Occupations: Director; screenwriter
- Years active: 2007–present
- Spouse: Rama Adi (m. 2007)

Mouly Surya (born 10 September 1980) is an Indonesian film director and screenwriter.

Beginning her career as assistant director and screenwriter in local film productions, Surya rose to prominence in 2008 for her directorial debut the psychological thriller Fiksi. which won her the Citra Award for Best Director. She won a second Best Director award at the 38th Citra Award for Marlina the Murderer in Four Acts ten years after winning her first. She is the first woman director to win the award and, as of 2022, remains the only one to do so.

== Early life ==
Surya studied Media and Literature in Australia and earned a B. A. from Swinburne University and an M. A. from Bond University. While in Australia, she ran a blog and became online friends with then-unknown Raditya Dika who was studying in Adelaide and later became a collaborator in the film adaptation of his best-selling book Kambing Jantan.

== Career ==
=== 2007–2012: Debut, Cinesurya, and Citra Award for Best Director ===
Upon graduation, Surya came back to Indonesia and gained experience in the local film industry by working as assistant directors in Rako Prijanto's comedy-drama D'Bijis (2007) and romance Love Is Red (2007). While working on the latter, she met future husband Rama Adi, who was part of the film's cinematography department.

In 2007, she acquired funding to direct Fiksi. based on a screenplay she developed herself. She and Adi decided to become collaborators and founded their own film production company Cinesurya. Based on the advice of Riri Riza, they decided to seek another collaborator who could bring more experience in shaping the screenplay, which turned out to be producer Tia Hasibuan and Joko Anwar. Anwar spent a month working on Surya's draft and was credited as a co-writer.

In 2008, Fiksi. was released theatrically with Ladya Cheryl, Donny Alamsyah, and Kinaryosih in the starring roles. The film received critical acclaim, but failed commercially with only 30 thousand admissions. At the 28th Citra Awards, Surya made history by becoming the first woman to win Best Director since the award was first given in 1955. Overall, the film won four out of its ten nominations, the other three being Best Picture, Best Screenplay for Surya and Anwar, and Best Original Score.

In 2009, Surya co-wrote the screenplay of Kambing Jantan: The Movie with Salman Aristo and friend Raditya Dika based on Dika's novel of the same name.

=== 2013–2018: History at Sundance and second Citra Award for Best Director ===
In 2013, Surya wrote and directed her sophomore feature What They Don't Talk About When They Talk About Love. In January, the film made history as the first Indonesian film to compete at the Sundance Film Festival of that year in the World Dramatic Competition, where it also had its world premiere. Domestically, the film was released in May 2013. It stars Nicholas Saputra and Ayushita in the starring roles. The film is a romantic drama involving characters with different types of disabilities. The film performed poorly at the box office but received positive reviews from critics, with The Hollywood Reporter's Duane Byrge calling it a "touching and brilliantly envisioned story of a young, nearly blind teen's first love."

Surya then released her third feature film Marlina the Murderer in Four Acts in 2017. It premiered at the Directors' Fortnight event of the 2017 Cannes Film Festival in May before receiving a domestic release later in November. A revenge drama-thriller, the film was only the fourth Indonesian film ever to make the festival's official selection after Eros Djarot's Tjoet Nja' Dhien and Garin Nugroho's Leaf on a Pillow in 1998 as well as Nugroho's Serambi in 2006. While Surya co-wrote the screenplay with husband and collaborator Rama Adi, Garin Nugroho is credited with the original story, which he shared with Surya while they were part of a Citra Award jury panel. Marsha Timothy stars as a young widow who is raped and violated by local thugs and sets out to take revenge on her attackers.

In a review for Variety following its Cannes screening, Maggie Lee gave the film a rave review, praising Surya's ability to "build nail-biting tension" with a climax that "rivals any of [Quentin] Tarantino's high concept violence". Lee's description of the film as having "pioneered a new genre" coined the term "satay Western" in reference to the film's Western style but told from a female perspective while incorporating Indonesia's traditional values. The term "satay Western" has since been used in multiple media coverage of the film.

At the 38th Citra Awards the following year, Marlina the Murderer in Four Acts received 15 nominations, breaking Teguh Karya's Mother's record of the most nominations received by a film ever with 10 in 1986. The record was later broken by Joko Anwar's Impetigore which received 17 nominations in 2020. It went on to win 10 awards, including Best Picture, a second Best Director for Surya, Best Actress for Marsha Timothy, Best Supporting Actress for Dea Panendra, and Best Original Screenplay for Surya and Adi. The film was selected as Indonesia's official entry for the Best Foreign Language Film category at the 91st Academy Awards, but failed to get a nomination.

In July 2018, Surya released a short music film We See You Jakarta on the YouTube channel of the English indie pop band The xx. The film features footage from the band's I See You Tour as well as rearranged music performed by the film's cast.

=== 2019–present: Upcoming projects and international breakthrough ===
In late 2019, Surya began production on an adaptation of Mochtar Lubis' novel A Road with no End, something Surya mentioned is a dream project for her. The film, titled This City Is a Battlefield, is a war drama set in 1946 just after Indonesia's independence the previous year.

Commissioned by the Singapore International Film Festival and produced by Cinesurya, Surya's short film Something Old, New, Borrowed and Blue was released in March 2020. The film stars Ayushita and veteran actress Christine Hakim. Another short, titled Doll, premiered the following month on YouTube. The film was made while Surya was a student in Australia and contains dialogue in English.

In May 2020, Netflix announced that Surya will helm the action-thriller film Trigger Warning with a screenplay by Josh Olson (known for David Cronenberg's A History of Violence) and John Brancato (known for David Fincher's The Game). Jessica Alba stars as a PTSD afflicted former service-member who inherits her grandfather's bar and soon discovers the truth behind his death.

== Personal life ==
Surya is married to Rama Adi, who co-founded their production company Cinesurya and has been involved in her first three films. They won a Citra Award together in 2018 for co-writing Marlina the Murderer in Four Acts.

== Filmography ==
Film

Year	Title	Director	Writer
2008	Fiksi.	Yes	Yes
2009	Kambing Jantan: The Movie	No	Yes
2013	What They Don't Talk About When They Talk About Love	Yes	Yes
2017	Marlina the Murderer in Four Acts	Yes	Yes
2024	Trigger Warning	Yes	No
2025	This City Is a Battlefield	Yes	Yes

Short film

Year	Title	Director	Writer	Producer
2018	We See You Jakarta	Yes	No	No
2020	Something Old, New, Borrowed and Blue	Yes	Yes	No
2020	Doll	Yes	Yes	Yes

== Awards and nominations ==
Beginning her career as assistant director and screenwriter in local film productions, Surya rose to prominence in 2008 for her directorial debut the psychological thriller Fiksi. which won her the Citra Award for Best Director. She won a second Best Director award at the 38th Citra Award for her satay Western Marlina the Murderer in Four Acts in 2017. As of 2020, she remains the first and only woman director to have won the award.
