= Regret (film) =

1995 Indonesian film

- Indonesian: Sesal
- Directed by: Sophan Sophiaan
- Written by: Sophan Sophiaan; Alex Suprapto Yudho
- Based on: Sesal by Ramadhan K.H.
- Produced by: Jimmy Yonathan; Arifin Yacob; Hendri William
- Starring: Widyawati; Sophan Sophiaan; Rima Melati; Frans Tumbuan; Deddy Mizwar
- Cinematography: Herman Susilo
- Edited by: Ch Darmawan
- Music by: Areng Widodo
- Production companies: Sinemasakini; Multi Permai Films; Global Sarana Media Nusantara
- Release date: 12 January 1995
- Running time: 104 minutes
- Country: Indonesia
- Languages: Indonesian; Dutch; English

Regret (Indonesian: Sesal) is a 1995 Indonesian teen drama film directed by Sophan Sophiaan, based on the short story by Ramdhan K. H. Produced by Sophiaan's own company Sinemasakini in association with Multi Permai Films and Global Sarana Media Nusantara, the film stars Widyawati and Sophiaan in their respective lead roles.

== Synopsis ==
On their 22nd wedding anniversary, Mutia was suffered in a liver cancer, which she would not changed her attitudes to her husband Affan. Although she was sympathetic, their children, Ganang and Gadis, are unlikely to be stronger when they have conflicts. When Affan's solitude began to rose, Mutia has died, leaving her husband's regrets.

== Cast ==
- Widyawati as Mutia Aminullah
- Sophan Sophiaan as Affan Aminullah
- Rima Melati and Frans Tumbuan as themselves
- Deddy Mizwar as a pilot captain

== Music ==
Indonesian singer Oki Oktaviani performs two songs in this film, with one being a cover of a song written by Dwiki Dharmawan and Ags. Arya Dipayana, titled "Dengan Menyebut Nama Allah" as the theme song of the film.

== Release ==
Prior to its limited release, Regret received a linear television premiere on Indosiar, on 12 January 1995. It eventually received a limited theatrical release a day later, in select Indonesian theatres. Sophan Sophiaan submitted the film at the 40th Asia-Pacific Film Festival, which held from 23 to 28 July 1995.
