= Judika =

Indonesian singer, actor and record producer (born 1978)

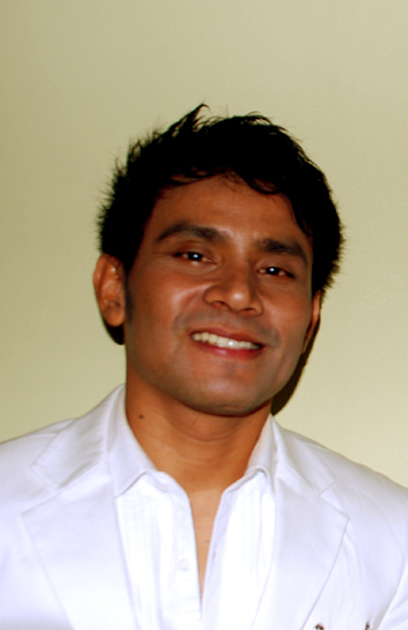
- Judika in 2009
- Born: Judika Nalom Abadi Sihotang; 31 August 1978 (age 47); Berastagi, North Sumatra, Indonesia
- Occupations: Singer; actor; record producer
- Years active: 2005–present
- Spouse: Duma Riris Silalahi (m. 2013)
- Children: 2
- Musical career
- Genres: Pop; pop rock; hard rock; soft rock; R&B
- Instrument: Vocal
- Labels: Sony Indonesia; Dua Anak Deo
- Formerly of: Mahadewa; Antero Boys

Judika Nalom Abadi Sihotang (born 31 August 1978), known mononymously as Judika, is an Indonesian singer and actor. He has released seven albums (some of which were multi-platinum selling) and received multiple awards including Anugerah Musik Indonesia and Anugerah Planet Muzik. Three of his songs were featured as soundtracks in Indonesian drama series.

Judika started his professional singing career as a runner-up in Indonesian Idol season 2 in 2005. He has also been a judge in multiple singing talent shows, such as Indonesian Idol, X Factor Indonesia, The Voice Indonesia, Rising Star Indonesia, and The Indonesian Next Big Star. He has starred in six feature films, including Fire Squad and The Tarix Jabrix 2.

== Early life ==
Judika Nalon Abadi Sihotang was born and grow up in Berastagi, North Sumatra, the sixth child of seven children from Sumanggar Sihotang and Nursia Silalahi. His father works as a civil servant in the religious department. Before becoming a singer, Judika has explored various jobs including shoe polisher, tire repair, and busking.

Since elementary school, Judika has been fond of singing. He made a vocal group with his brother, Roy and two friends in which, they were contracted at a 5-star international hotel in Brastagi. He also took part in the student voice contest Bahana Suara Pelajar in 1993, He won first place at the North Sumatra level and was in third place at the National level. He had studied accounting in STMIK Bina Mulya but, decided to leave to pursue a professional career as a singer.

== Career ==
=== 1998–2006: Career beginnings and Indonesian Idol ===
Judika took part in the Asia Bagus talent search show in 1998 in Singapore. He won 2nd place and then formed a trio group called Antero Boys which consisted of Asia Bagus participants. This group appeared on all national television networks. Judika still had to take a regular job as a café singer in Jakarta as their career were unstable.

In the seventh year of the group's establishment, Judika joined Indonesian Idol season 2 audition in 2005. He received a golden ticket, continued to the final round and became a runner-up.

Indonesian Idol season 2 performances and results
Week #	Song choice	Original artist	Result
Audition	"Because of You" "Inikah Cinta"	Kelly Clarkson; M.E.	Golden ticket
Workshop Top 24	Sedih Tak Berujung	Glenn Fredly	Pass
Spekta Top 12	Karma	Cokelat	Pass
Spekta Top 11	"Terlalu Manis"	Slank	Pass
Spekta Top 10	This I Promise You	'N Sync	Pass
Spekta Top 9	Puncak Asmara	Utha Likumahua	Pass
Spekta Top 8	Rocker Juga Manusia	Seurieus	Pass
Spekta Top 7	Hampa	Ari Lasso	Pass
Spekta Top 6	"Making Love Out of Nothing at All"	Air Supply	Pass
Spekta Top 5	"Aku Cinta Kau Dan Dia" "Sepenuh Hati"	Ahmad Band; Ariyo	Pass
Spekta Top 4	"Rahasia Hati" "Can't Help Falling in Love"	Element; Elvis Presley	Pass
Spekta Top 3	"Heaven" "Marilah Kemari"	Bryan Adams; Various Artists	Pass
Grand Final	"Semua Untuk Cinta" "Rocker Juga Manusia" "Jemu"	Original song Badfinger; Koes Plus	Runner-up

=== 2007–2010: One, Setengah Mati Merindu and acting debut ===
After Indonesian Idol, Judika was signed to Sony Music Indonesia in 2007 and released his first single "Bukan Rayuan Gombal". His debut studio album, One, was released on 22 January. In 2008, he made his acting debut and starred in Fire Squad directed by Iqbal Rais in which, he won an award for Favorite Newcomer Actor at the 2009 Indonesian Movie Awards. Judika also then starred at The Tarix Jabrix 2.

In 2010, Judika released his second studio album Setengah Mati Merindu. He produced the lead single "Setengah Mati Merindu" which, earned a nomination for Best Male (Artist) in 2011 Anugerah Planet Muzik. Judika's song "Bukan Dia Tapi Aku" also earned a nomination for Most Popular Regional Song at the 2012 Anugerah Planet Muzik.

=== 2011–2014: Mahadewa, Mencari Cinta and Hati and Cinta ===
In 2011, Judika joined a band formed by Ahmad Dhani, Mahadewa and released the first single "Cinta Itu Buta". In 2013, Judika released his third album Mencari Cinta after being signed by Sony Music Indonesia twice as a solo artist. He also released a song "Sampai Akhir" with his wife, Duma Riris Silalahi for his wedding.

Judika's fourth studio album Hati & Cinta was released on 20 November 2014. One of the album's song list "Sampai Kau Jadi Milikku" reached high rank in the Indonesian chart song and radio. Judika announced through Twitter that he had decided to depart Mahadewa and was replaced by Virzha, an Indonesian Idol season 8 finalist.

=== 2015–present: Departure from Mahadewa and became a talent search judge ===
In January 2016, Judika was appointed as a coach in The Voice Indonesia with Agnez Mo, Kaka Slank and Ari Lasso. Judika was also an expert on Rising Star Indonesia for season 2 and season 3 with Rossa and Ariel.

Siti Nurhaliza chose Judika as one of the Indonesian musicians to collaborate for a song entitled "Kisa Ku Inginkan" with her in 2017, and won the 2018 Anugerah Planet Muzik for Best Collaboration Category.

Judika released a single on 28 June 2019, "Cinta Karena Cinta" which is, adapted from Nicholas Tse's "Yin Wei Ai Suo Yi Ai". The song reached Billboard Indonesia Top 100 as a number-one singles and was chosen as the theme song for Indonesian drama series Cinta Karena Cinta. It also won the 2019 Most Popular Drama Series Soundtrack in the SCTV Awards.

In the midst of the COVID-19 pandemic, Judika wrote an album Teruslah Berharap which he released through his independent label Dua Anak Deo in December 2021. The album was inspired by the pandemic, and the song "Bagaimana Kalau Aku Tidak Baik-baik Saja" was inspired by the Korean television series Crash Landing on You. Within 10 months, the album sold 580,000 copies and went Multi-Platinum.

== Personal life ==
After being in a relationship for 6 years with the Indonesian beauty pageant titleholder, Duma Riris Silalahi, they married on Judika's 35th birthday on 31 August 2013. Their holy matrimony was held at HKBP Balige Church, North Sumatra. Judika and Duma have two children, Cleo Deomora Boru Sihotang (born 2014) Judeo Volante Sihotang (born 2018).

== Business and ventures ==
On 14 October 2016, Judika and his wife Duma Riris Silalahi established a record label, PT. Dua Anak Deo. They collaborate with Sony Music Entertainment to market, record and produce music videos. Newcomers who signed are Dnanda, Daniel Pattinama, Yan Josua, Axin and Nurlela.

== Artistry ==
Judika was one of the singers who received the title KRH (Kanjeng Raden Haryo) Kencana Ningrat from the Surakarta Hadiningrat Palace, Central Java in 2015 because he was considered to have a major role in preserving the culture of the Nusantara through music.

=== Voice and musical style ===
Judika has a powerful chest voice, wide vocal range (3 octave). His vocal range starts from low B (B2) below middle C to B (B5) above high C. He can reach high C (C5), which is a high tone for men, without using falsetto.

Judika's music is generally pop, rock, folk and RnB on several songs. Even so, he also appeared several times to perform dangdut and jazz songs.

=== Songwriting ===
Most of Judika's songs are written from his romantic life with his wife, Duma Riris Silalahi. Silalahi was also involved in a number of songs' creative processes.

== Discography ==
=== Albums ===
- One (2007)
- Setengah Mati Merindu (2010)
- Mencari Cinta (2013)
- Hati & Cinta (2014)
- The Best of Judika (2015)
- Judika (2017)
- Teruslah Berharap (2021)

=== Singles ===
Title	Years	Peak position	Album
Title	Years	IDN	Album
"Cinta Karena Cinta"	2019	1	Non-album single
"Tak Mungkin Bersama"	2020	12	Teruslah Berharap
"Putus atau Terus"	2020	—	Teruslah Berharap
"Hilang Tapi Ada"	2021	—	Teruslah Berharap
"Bagaimana Kalau Aku Tidak Baik-Baik Saja"	2021	—	Teruslah Berharap
"Cinta Ini Milik Kita" (ft. Duma Riris Silalahi)	2021	—	Teruslah Berharap
"Teman Hidup"	2021	—	Teruslah Berharap
"Ini Waktumu"	2021	—	Non-album single

== Filmography ==
Year	Title	Role	Notes
2008	Fire Squad	Rojak Panggabean	Acting debut
2009	The Tarix Jabrix 2	Bruno	
2011	Golden Goal	Balga Siapiapi	
2013	Crazy Love	—N/a	Cameo
2015	Air & Api	Rojak Panggabean	
2015	Toba Dreams	—N/a	Cameo

== Awards and nominations ==
Year	Award	Category	Work	Result	Ref.
2009	Indonesian Movie Awards	Best Newcomer Actor	Fire Squad	Won	
2009	Indonesian Movie Awards	Favorite Newcomer Actor	Fire Squad	Nominated	
2012	Anugerah Planet Muzik	Most Popular Regional Artist	"Bukan Dia Tapi Aku"	Nominated	
2012	Anugerah Planet Muzik	Most Popular Regional Songs	"Bukan Dia Tapi Aku"	Nominated	
2012	Inbox Awards	The Inbox Male Solo Singer	—N/a	Nominated	
2012	Anugerah Musik Indonesia	Best Original Film Soundtrack Production Work	Cinta Satukan Kita	Nominated	
2013	Dahsyatnya Awards	The Dahsyat Male Solo Singer	—N/a	Nominated	
2013	Inbox Awards	The Inbox Male Solo Singer	—N/a	Nominated	
2013	Anugerah Planet Muzik	Best Male Artist	—N/a	Won	
2014	Dahsyatnya Awards	The Dahsyat Male Solo Singer	—N/a	Nominated	
2014	Dahsyatnya Awards	The Dahsyat Collaborative Duo/Group	—N/a	Nominated	
2014	Dahsyatnya Awards	The Dahsyat Couple	—N/a	Nominated	
2014	Inbox Awards	The Inbox Male Solo Singer	—N/a	Won	
2014	Anugerah Planet Muzik	Best Male Artist	"Mama Papa Larang"	Won	
2014	Anugerah Planet Muzik	APM Most Popular Song	"Aku Yang Tersakiti" ft. Kotak	Nominated	
2014	Anugerah Musik Indonesia	Best Pop Album	Mencari Cinta	Nominated	
2014	Anugerah Musik Indonesia	Best Album	Mencari Cinta	Nominated	
2014	Anugerah Musik Indonesia	Best Producer Recording Album	Mencari Cinta	Nominated	
2014	Anugerah Musik Indonesia	Best Best Production Work	"Sampai Akhir" ft. Duma Riris Silalahi	Nominated	
2014	Anugerah Musik Indonesia	Best Pop Collaboration	"Sampai Akhir" ft. Duma Riris Silalahi	Won	
2014	Anugerah Musik Indonesia	Best Collaborative Production Work	"Sampai Akhir" ft. Duma Riris Silalahi	Won	
2014	SCTV Awards	Most Popular Singer	—N/a	Nominated	
2015	Dahsyatnya Awards	The Dahsyat Male Solo Singer	—N/a	Nominated	
2015	Anugerah Musik Indonesia	Best Pop Male Solo Artist	"Apakah Ini Cinta"	Nominated	
2015	Indonesian Choice Awards	Male Singer of the Year	—N/a	Won	
2015	Selebrita Awards	The Seleb Song	"Sampai Kau Jadi Milikku"	Won	
2015	Inbox Awards	The Inbox Male Solo Singer	—N/a	Nominated	
2015	Anugerah Planet Muzik	Best Male Artist	—N/a	Won	
2016	Dahsyatnya Awards	The Dahsyat Male Solo Singer	—N/a	Nominated	
2016	SCTV Music Awards	Most Popular Male Solo Singer	—N/a	Nominated	
2018	Anugerah Planet Muzik	Best Male Artist	—N/a	Won	
2018	Anugerah Planet Muzik	Best Song	"Jikalau Kau Cinta"	Won	
2018	Anugerah Planet Muzik	APM Best Songs	"Jikalau Kau Cinta"	Won	
2018	Anugerah Planet Muzik	Best Collaboration	"Kisah Ku Inginkan" ft. Siti Nurhaliza	Won	
2019	SCTV Music Awards	Most Popular Male Solo Singer	—N/a	Won	
2019	SCTV Music Awards	Most Popular Video Clips	"Jikalau Kau Cinta"	Won	
2019	SCTV Awards	Most Popular Drama Series Soundtrack	"Jikalau Kau Cinta"	Nominated	
2019	SCTV Awards	Most Popular Drama Series Soundtrack	"Cinta Karena Cinta"	Won	
2021	Anugerah Musik Indonesia	Best Pop Solo Artist	"Putus atau Terus"	Won	
