= Maling Kutang =

- Poster
- Directed by: Rako Prijanto
- Written by: Raditya Dika
- Produced by: Ody Mulya Hidayat
- Starring: Arie K Untung; Indra Birowo; Deswita Maharani; Kinaryosih
- Cinematography: Rendra Yusworo
- Edited by: Azis Natandra
- Music by: Joseph S Djafar
- Production company: Maxima Pictures
- Release date: 1 October 2009
- Running time: 80 minutes
- Country: Indonesia
- Language: Indonesian

Maling Kutang (literally The Bra Thief) is a 2009 Indonesian comedy film directed by Rako Prijanto. Starring Arie K. Untung, Indra Birowo, Deswita Maharani, and Kinaryosih, it follows two neighbours who steal a bra they think is magical. It was released to mixed critical reception.

== Plot ==
Syamsul (Indra Birowo) and his wife Yuyun (Deswita Maharani) run an unsuccessful grocery shop and are seeking a way to compete with that run by the friendly Ina (Kinaryosih), which is always busy. Meanwhile, Sugeni (Arie K. Utung) is a chocolate salesman who wears a gorilla costume while working. As he is unsuccessful, his grandmother (Nani Widjaja) tells him to work as a transvestite. When this fails, an upset Sugeni throws away his grandmother's polka-dot bra, which he is wearing. It lands in front of Ina's shop. Ina, awakened by the noise, goes outside moments after Sugeni flees.

Yuyun, a firm believer in the supernatural, sees Ina pick up the bra and assumes that she is praying to it; she credits these prayers with Ina's successful business. She tells Syamsul to steal the bra, and the following night they sneak into Ina's home and take all of the bras there. Sugeni, meanwhile, is scolded by his grandmother for losing her bra and is told he must find it.

The theft becomes a national sensation after it is reported, leading Syamsul to have nightmares. He attempts to throw the bra off the balcony, but is stopped by Yuyun. As they argue, Sugeni passes by and sees the bra before they finish. That night, he sneaks into Yuyun and Syamsul's home, dressed as a demon, to retrieve the bra, but is forced to leave after being spotted. The following day, Syamsul and Yuyun call a dukun (shaman) to exorcise their home; the dukun is actually Sugeni in disguise, and he tells Syamsul to discard the bra. When Syamsul does so, the bra becomes caught on a passing odong-odong (carriage). Yuyun cries out that the driver has stolen her bra, and the villagers chase the odong-odong and begin beating the driver. Yuyun, meanwhile, steals the bra.

Afraid they will be caught, Syamsul and Yuyun begin trying various schemes to dispose of the bra. When they attempt to leave it in the woods, Sugeni (in his gorilla costume) follows them and tries to take it. However, two park rangers see him and—thinking he is a real gorilla—shoot him with tranquillisers. He stumbles through the woods and takes refuge in a truck, which is on its way to Syamsul and Yuyun's shop to deliver supplies. Bakrie (Ence Bagus), the driver, delivers the boxes and, unknowingly, the bra to the shop. When Syamsul and Yuyun discover the bra, they are shocked.

They then try to throw the bra into the sea and to bury it, but nothing works. Finally, they burn it. Meanwhile, Sugeni—who has realised that he has lost the bra again—meets a transvestite named Alfred, who directs him to a shop in Blok M, where he discovers that the bra is in fact a rare model designed by Slamet Kartowardoyo. Sugeni buys a new one from the designer, but upon returning home he discovers that his grandmother has died. Sugeni then throws away the bra, and it ends up at Syamsul and Yuyun's home. The couple are now bankrupt, and Bakrie finds the bra. When Ina sees him picking it up, she calls the police, who are able to unravel the entire story. Syamsul, Yuyun, and Bakrie move elsewhere, where they become wealthy selling bras.

A year later, their former shop has been occupied by a husband and wife (Andi Soraya and Epy Kusnandar), who open another grocery shop. One night, as Alfred is passing, he wets himself in front of Ina's home and discards his panties there. When Ina tries to pick them up, the cycle begins again: the new neighbours believe she is praying and start planning to steal the garment.

== Production ==
Maling Kutang was directed by Rako Prijanto, best known for his comedies, and produced by Ody Mulya Hidayat of Maxima Pictures. The script was written by Raditya Dika, who had recently become popular after the success of his blog-turned-novel Kambing Jantan. A review of the film in The Jakarta Globe suggested that Dika had an "incongruous style of observational humour", which remained evident in Maling Kutang. Cinematography, which took less than a week, was handled by Rendra Yusworo, while editing was completed by Azis Natandra. Music was provided by Joseph S Djafar, with Yusuf A Patawari and Khikmawan Santosa on sound.

The film starred Arie K. Untung, Indra Birowo, Deswita Maharani, and Kinaryosih, with minor roles played by actors including Fanny Fadillah and Nani Widjaja. In an interview, Kinaryosih – who had several years' experience working in comedies – stated that she had been told the title was Kutang Kutangkap (I Catch a Bra) during casting.

The film's title is a play on Malin Kundang, a Minang folktale.

== Release and reception ==
Maling Kutang was released on 1 October 2009, with a press screening at Jakarta Theater the day before. This was several weeks before Dika's Menculik Miyabi (Kidnapping Miyabi), starring AV idol Maria Ozawa, was scheduled to begin production.

The film received a mixed reception. A review in The Jakarta Globe suggested that Maling Kutang was a "like a mere preview" for Menculik Miyabi. The reviewer praised several aspects of the film, including Untung's "Jim Carrey-esque" performance, and summarised that Maling Kutang was sufficient for "a few light laughs", but audiences might find it better to wait for Menculik Miyabi. A review on the entertainment website KapanLagi.com found the film better than its title suggested, with a clear plot and good performances by Birowo and Maharani, but considered the reliance on sexual innuendo to be poor form. Kartoyo DS, writing for Suara Karya, considered the comedy forced; he wrote that the film, unlike the Warkop comedies of the 1980s, did not produce any laughs.

== Works cited ==
- "Bra-vo for Effort, But 'Maling Kutang' Lacks Porn Factor". Jakarta Globe. 6 October 2009.
- DS, Kartoyo (1 February 2010). "Maling Kutang, Komedi yang Dipaksakan" [Maling Kutang, A Forced Comedy]. Jakarta Globe (in Indonesian).
- "Kinaryosih Pasrah Produksi 'Maling Kutang'" [Kinaryosih Resigned to Produce 'Maling Kutang']. KapanLagi.com (in Indonesian). Jakarta. Archived from the original on 19 June 2013.
- "Kredit Lengkap Maling Kutang" [Credits for Maling Kutang]. filmindonesia.or.id (in Indonesian). Jakarta: Konfidan Foundation. Archived from the original on 30 June 2017.
- "'Maling Kutang', Memburu Kutang Ajaib" ['Maling Kutang', Chasing the Magic Bra]. KapanLagi.com (in Indonesian). Jakarta. Archived from the original on 12 March 2013.
- "Press-Screening Film Maling Kutang" [Press Screening for the Film Maling Kutang]. KapanLagi.com (in Indonesian). Jakarta. Archived from the original on 8 June 2013.
