= Widyawati =

Indonesian actress (born 1950)

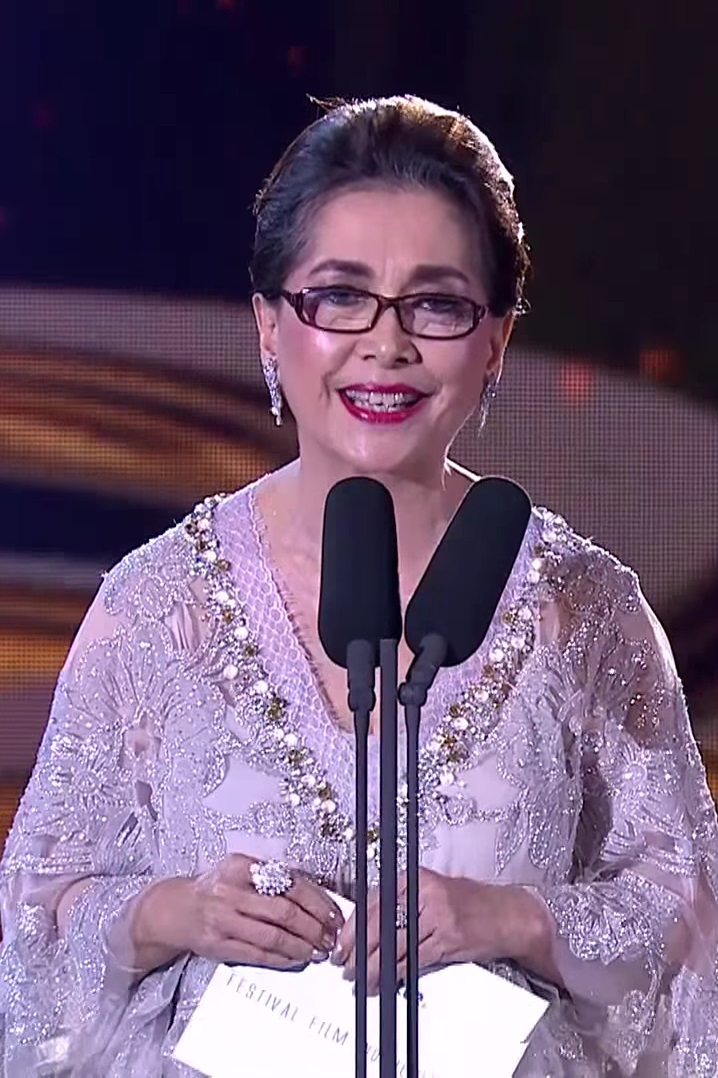
- Widyawati at the 2015 Indonesian Film Festival
- Born: Widyawati; July 12, 1950 (age 75); Bandung, West Java, Indonesia
- Occupation: Actress
- Years active: 1967 - present
- Spouse: Sophan Sophiaan (m. 1972; died 2008)
- Children: Roma Sophiaan; Romi Sophiaan
- Parent(s): Adisura Soeradibrata (father); Aryati (mother)
- Awards: Citra Awards for Best Leading Actress 1987 Arini (Masih Ada Kereta yang Akan Lewat) Citra Awards for Best Supporting Actress 1977 Semoga Kau Kembali

Signature
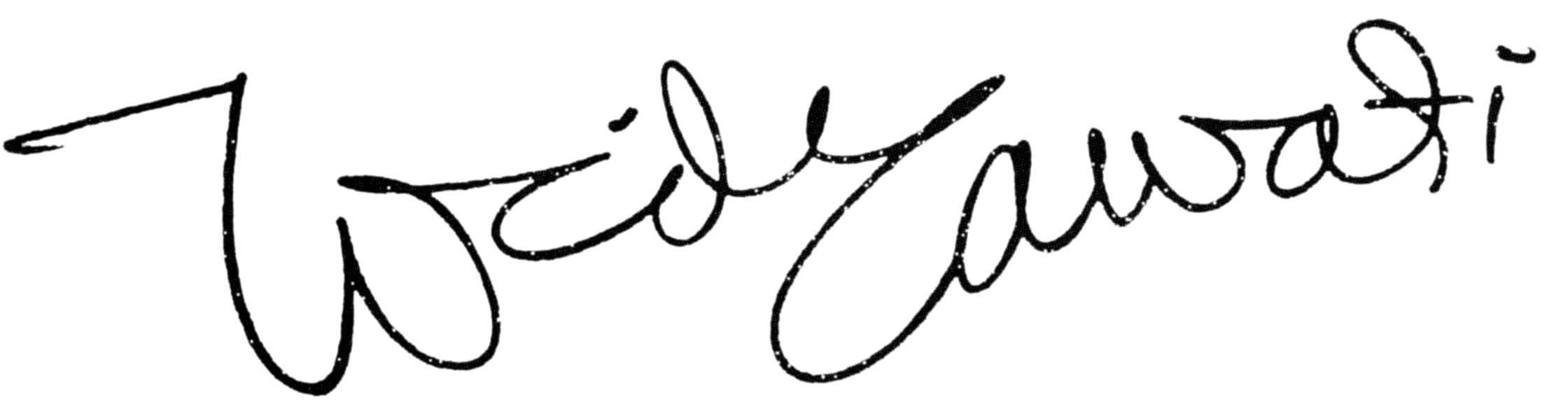

Widyawati (born July 12, 1950) is an Indonesian actress. She is the widow of Indonesian actor, director and politician, Sophan Sophiaan. Her father in-law is the former Indonesian ambassador for the Soviet Union and prominent politician, Manai Sophiaan.

== Filmography ==
=== Films ===
| Year | Title | Role | Note(s) |
|---|---|---|---|
| 1965 | Segenggam Tanah Perbatasan | | Debut acting |
| 1967 | Piso Komando | | |
| 1968 | Ja, Mualim | Rokayah | |
| 1969 | Apa jang Kau Tjari, Palupi? | Putri | |
| 1970 | Incontro d'Amore | Gimuk | |
| 1970 | Hidup, Tjinta dan Air Mata | Sari | |
| 1970 | Romansa | Fatimah | |
| 1971 | Matahari Hampir Terbenam | Sita | |
| 1971 | Impas | | |
| 1971 | Pengantin Remadja | Juli | |
| 1971 | Perawan Buta | Oni | |
| 1972 | Perkawinan | Inge | |
| 1972 | Si Bongkok | Nilam | |
| 1972 | Anjing-Anjing Geladak | Mauli | |
| 1972 | Tjintaku Djauh di Pulau | Suster Narti | |
| 1973 | Anak Yatim | Ibu tiri Yeyen | |
| 1973 | Pencopet | Vera | |
| 1973 | Perempuan | Maryani | |
| 1973 | Rindu | Ningsih | |
| 1973 | Timang-Timang Anakku Sayang | Murni | |
| 1974 | Aku Cinta Padamu | Arni Sulaiman | |
| 1974 | Demi Cinta | Hesti | |
| 1974 | Kehormatan | Santi | |
| 1974 | Cinta Remaja | Mira | |
| 1974 | Gaun Pengantin | Ira | |
| 1974 | Romi dan Juli | Juli | |
| 1975 | Jinak-Jinak Merpati | Amalia | |
| 1976 | Antara Surga dan Neraka | | |
| 1976 | Semoga Kau Kembali | | |
| 1977 | Kemelut Hidup | Susana | |
| 1978 | Satu Malam Dua Cinta | Sita | |
| 1978 | Bung Kecil | Ira | |
| 1980 | Kemilau Kemuning Senja | dr. Friska | |
| 1980 | Di Sini Cinta Pertama Kali Bersemi | Melia dewasa | |
| 1980 | Buah Hati Mama | Nona | |
| 1981 | Amalia S.H. | Amalia | |
| 1981 | Jangan Ambil Nyawaku | | |
| 1984 | Tinggal Landas buat Kekasih | Ida | |
| 1987 | Arini, Masih Ada Kereta yang akan Lewat | Arini | |
| 1988 | Suami | Marsya | |
| 1988 | Bayi Tabung | Jelina | |
| 1989 | Sesaat dalam Pelukan | Erna | |
| 1990 | Perempuan Kedua | Rani | |
| 1991 | Yang Tercinta | | |
| 1994 | Sesal | Mutia | |
| 2008 | Love | Lestari | |
| 2009 | Perempuan Berkalung Sorban | Nyai Muthmainah | |
| 2010 | Demi Dewi | Kak Ima | |
| 2010 | Satu Jam Saja | dr. Illa | |
| 2011 | Di Bawah Lindungan Ka'bah | Nyonya Ja'far | |
| 2013 | Rectoverso: Cinta yang Tak Terucap | Ibu Senja | Segmen: Firasat |
| 2016 | Surat dari Praha | Sulastri | |
| 2017 | The Guys | Ibu Yana | |
| 2017 | Critical Eleven | Atikah Risjad | |
| 2017 | Sweet 20 | Rahayu | |
| 2018 | Mama Mama Jagoan | Dayu | |
| 2019 | Ambu | Ambu Misnah | |
| 2019 | Bridezilla | Anna | |
| 2019 | Mahasiswi Baru | Lastri | |
| 2020 | Sabar Ini Ujian | Ibu Sabar | |
| 2021 | Eyang Ti | Eyang Murti | |
| 2022 | Ghost Writer 2 | Anna | |
| 2023 | Hati Suhita | Mbah Putri | |
| 2023 | Ketika Berhenti di Sini | Oma | |
| 2023 | Dear Jo: Almost is Never Enough | Daria | |
| 2023 | Rumah Masa Depan | Kokom | |
| 2024 | #OOTD: Outfit of the Designer | Andung | |
| 2024 | Romeo Ingkar Janji | Oma Suci | |
| 2025 | A Normal Woman | Liliana Gunawan | |
| TBA | Keluarga Slamet | Ibu Marni | |

Notes

Denotes film or TV productions that have not yet been released
- TBA: To be announced

=== TV Series ===
| Year | Title | Role | Note(s) |
|---|---|---|---|
| 2022 | Mendua | Rosmina Atmajaya | |

== Awards and nominations ==
| Award | Year | Category | Recipients | Result |
|---|---|---|---|---|
| Indonesian Film Festival | 1977 | Citra Award for Best Supporting Actress | Semoga Kau Kembali | Won |
| Indonesian Film Festival | 1981 | Citra Award for Best Leading Actress | Buah Hati Mama | Nominated |
| Indonesian Film Festival | 1983 | Citra Award for Best Leading Actress | Amalia SH | Nominated |
| Indonesian Film Festival | 1987 | Citra Award for Best Leading Actress | Arini (Masih Ada Kereta yang Akan Lewat) | Won |
| Indonesian Film Festival | 1990 | Citra Award for Best Leading Actress | Sesaat dalam Pelukan | Nominated |
| Indonesian Film Festival | 2009 | Citra Award for Best Supporting Actress | Perempuan Berkalung Sorban | Nominated |
| Indonesian Film Festival | 2016 | Citra Award for Best Supporting Actress | Surat dari Praha | Nominated |
| Indonesian Film Festival | 2017 | Citra Award for Best Supporting Actress | Sweet 20 | Nominated |
