= Fire Squad (film) =

2008 comedy drama film by Iqbal Rais

- Theatrical release poster
- Indonesian: Si Jago Merah
- Directed by: Iqbal Rais
- Screenplay by: Hilman Mutasi
- Story by: Fajar Nugros
- Produced by: Chand Parwez Servia
- Starring: Ringgo Agus Rahman; Desta; Sukma Perdana Manaf; Judika; Poppy Sovia; Tika Putri
- Cinematography: Tono Wisnu
- Edited by: Cesa David Luckmansyah
- Music by: Candil
- Production company: Starvision Plus
- Release date: September 26, 2008
- Running time: 104 minutes
- Country: Indonesia
- Language: Indonesian

Fire Squad (Indonesian: Si Jago Merah) is a 2008 Indonesian comedy drama film directed by Iqbal Rais, from a screenplay by Hilman Mutasi and story by Fajar Nugros. The film, starring Ringgo Agus Rahman, Deddy Mahendra Desta, Sukma Perdana Manaf and Judika, follows some students who works as a firefighter. It was released theatrically on September 26, 2008 and was nominated at the Indonesian Movie Awards with Judika winning Best New Actor.

== Plot ==
Gito Prawoto, Dede Rifai, Kuncoro Prasetyo and Rojak Panggabean were threatened with drop outed from Merdeka University because they had not paid their tuition fees and their parents could afford to pay for college. The lecturers give dispensation but must pay at least one semester in a few days.

Each of them is looking for job, but they still need money for daily life. Until Kuncoro provided a solution to make it affordable and invited them to find a rented house near the campus and live a simple lifestyle. Gito got the idea to find a less tiring and time-consuming part-time job, a firefighter.

After attending the training, they are accepted as apprentices at the fire department as reserve officers with minimal equipment and are given the task of maintaining an old fire engine known as "Si Jago Merah". The students find their identity through a selfless heroic act that earns them an award from the mayor.

== Cast ==
- Ringgo Agus Rahman as Dede Rifai
- Deddy Mahendra Desta as Gito Prawoto
- Sukma Perdana Manaf as Kuncoro Prasetyo
- Judika as Rojak Panggabean
- Poppy Sovia as Nola
- Tika Putri as Airin
- Sarah Sechan as Susi Retnowati
- Indra Birowo as Kodrat
- Joe Project P as Commander
- Magdalena as Sally
- Billy W. Polli as Hendrik
- Fairly Wattimena as Anton
- Epy Kusnandar as Mr. Sugihan
- Rano Karno as Mayor
- Mpok Nori as Old woman
- Tuti Kembang Mentari as Grandma
- Fairly Wattimena as Anton
- Dennis Adhiswara as Taxi passenger
- Ence Bagus as Campus cleaning staff
- Iqbal Rais as Lighting Operator
- Emmie Lemu as Airin's maid

== Accolades ==
Award	Date of ceremony	Category	Recipient(s)	Result	Ref.
Indonesian Movie Awards	15 Mei 2009	Best Supporting Actress	Sarah Sechan	Nominated	
Indonesian Movie Awards	15 Mei 2009	Favorite Supporting Actress	Sarah Sechan	Nominated	
Indonesian Movie Awards	15 Mei 2009	Best New Actor	Judika	Won	
Indonesian Movie Awards	15 Mei 2009	Favorite Newcomer Actor	Judika	Nominated	
