= Manai Sophiaan =

Indonesian politician, journalist and diplomat

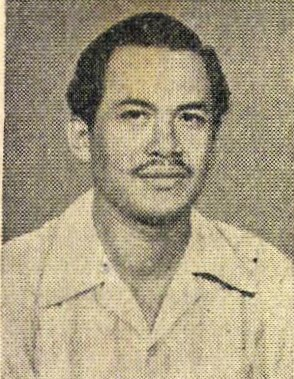
- Sophiaan, c.1955

Ambassador of Indonesia to the Soviet Union
- In office 1964–1967
- Preceded by: Adam Malik
- Succeeded by: Max Maramis

Personal details
- Born: 5 September 1915 Takalar, Dutch East Indies
- Died: 29 August 2003 (aged 87) Jakarta, Indonesia
- Party: PNI
- Other political affiliations: Parindra (before 1942)

Manai Sophiaan (5 September 1915 – 29 August 2003) was an Indonesian politician, journalist, and diplomat. Originating from South Sulawesi, Manai briefly became a journalist and teacher before joining the Indonesian National Party (PNI). His tenure in parliament saw one of his motions trigger the 17 October affair in 1952. Outside of his political career, he also briefly served as chief editor of the PNI newspaper Suluh Indonesia, and later became Indonesia's ambassador to the Soviet Union until the fall of Sukarno.

== Early life and education ==
Sophiaan was born in Takalar, near Makassar, on 5 September 1915, with his father working as a police officer. He completed his elementary to high school education around Makassar, graduating from a Meer Uitgebreid Lager Onderwijs in 1934. In his later memoir, Sophiaan wrote about an incident in his teens when he was treated as less than a Dutch man's dog, which according to him inspired his later opposition to Dutch rule. In 1936, he moved to Yogyakarta to enroll at a Taman Siswa school, and after graduating he became a teacher there until 1941.

== Career ==
During the Japanese occupation of the Dutch East Indies, Sophiaan became a journalist for the Pewarta Selebes newspaper, while also serving in the city council of Makassar. He was the deputy chairman of the Great Indonesia Party's branch there. After the proclamation of Indonesian independence, Sophiaan founded and ran the short-lived nationalist newspaper Soeara Indonesia in Makassar, before he fled to Java. He led a nationalist organization with members from Sulawesi during the Indonesian National Revolution, and was also a member of the Working Body of the Central Indonesian National Committee. When the Indonesian Journalists Association was established in 1946, Sophiaan became one of its founding members, the only one originating from South Sulawesi.

After the end of the revolution, Sophiaan joined the Indonesian National Party (PNI) and the Provisional People's Representative Council. Sophiaan was chairman of the PNI's Sulawesi branch within its first leadership structure formed in 1946, and later the party's national secretary-general. Within the parliament, he was one of several PNI leaders who were willing to criticize Sukarno (especially during the Mohammad Natsir premiership). During the Wilopo Cabinet, on 14 October 1952, Sophiaan put forward a motion in parliament which if passed would allow civilian politicians to alter the armed forces' command structure and replace its top commanders. The motion passed a vote on 16 October, triggering an immediate political crisis as the minister of defense Hamengkubuwono IX threatened to resign. This culminated in the 17 October affair the following day, with the army surrounding the presidential palace. Sophiaan's motion was postponed after the incident.

Sophiaan was also PNI's head of agitprop, and he was appointed to become the chief editor of the party's newspaper Suluh Indonesia to replace Sayuti Melik in December 1953. Within his tenure, the newspaper became increasingly aligned with the party line. He was reelected into the parliament following the 1955 Indonesian legislative election. Sukarno later appointed him as Ambassador to the Soviet Union in December 1963, replacing Adam Malik. Upon the fall of Sukarno, Sophiaan was recalled to Indonesia.

== Later life and death ==
Sophiaan’s son is actor and politician Sophan Sophiaan. He for a time became the editor-in-chief of the Suluh Marhaen newspaper after his recall, between 1968 and 1972. He was also a signatory of the "Petition of Fifty" which criticized Suharto's actions. He wrote two memoirs during the late New Order era: Apa Yang Masih Teringat (1991) which criticized the Indonesian Army's actions during the revolution and aftermath while defending Sukarno's political closeness to the Indonesian Communist Party, and Kehormatan Bagi Yang Berhak ("Honour for Him who Deserves") in 1994 which argued that Sukarno was uninvolved in the 30 September movement and accused the CIA of taking a part in it.

He died on 29 August 2003 at Jakarta's Pertamina Central Hospital from Parkinson's disease. He was buried at the Tanah Kusir Cemetery.

== Family ==
He was married to Moenasiah Paiso (d. 2002), daughter of a former political prisoner called Paiso, and had six children. One of his sons, Sophan Sophiaan, was an actor and politician of the Indonesian Democratic Party of Struggle.
