= The Changcuters =

Indonesian rock and roll band

- Origin: Bandung, Indonesia
- Genres: Rock and roll • garage rock
- Years active: 2004–present
- Labels: Masterplan; Sony; Wowma
- Members: Tria Ramadhani; Muhammad Iqbal; Arlanda Langitan; Dipa Hasibuan; Erick Nindyoastomo

The Changcuters is an Indonesian rock and roll band formed in 2004 in Bandung. The Band consists of Tria Ramadhani (vocal), Muhammad Iqbal/Qibil and Arlanda Langitan (guitar), Dipa Hasibuan (bass) and Erick Nindyoastomo (drums). They have released six albums, namely Mencoba Sukses (2006), The Changcuters & Misteri Kalajengking Hitam (2009), Tugas Akhir (2011), Visualis (2013), Binauralis (2016) and Loyalis (2020). Mencoba Sukses Kembali, a repackaged variant of Mencoba Sukses which was released in 2008, led to the group receiving the 2009 AMI Award for Best Newcomers. They have also played in The Tarix Jabrix trilogy. Their musical style is influenced by The Hives and The Rolling Stones.

== Name ==
The name of The Changcuters is rumored to be a derivation of the word "cangcut" (Indonesian for male's underwear), as pronounced with a Sundanese accent. However, the band insists that it was a pun of the name of a friend, namely Cahya. Ricky Siahaan from Rolling Stone Indonesia said, "Even from their name, you can tell that they are a comical band."

== Career ==
The Changcuters was formed in 2004 by Dipa, Tria and Qibil. Later on the band would be joined by Erick and Alda, members of Qibil's former high school band.

In August 2006, assisted by Uki of Peterpan, they released their debut album, Mencoba Sukses. However, due to limited distribution and promotion, the album did not sell well. They would then sign a contract with Sony BMG (now Sony Music) and the album was re-released in 2008 with the name Mencoba Sukses Kembali. The new album included two additional songs, namely "Racun Dunia" and "I Love You Bibeh". The musical style on the album is a mix of rock and roll and pop. Several tracks from this album were included on the soundtrack of The Tarix Jabrix (2008), a film in which they acted. As of 2009, the album has sold more than 75,000 copies. This album won the band Best Newcomers at the 2009 AMI Awards. Before releasing their second album, they released a single "Sang Penakluk Api", which was included on the soundtrack of Si Jago Merah (2008).

They launched their third album, The Changcuters & Misteri Kalajengking Hitam, in mid-2009. In "Main Serong", some of the lyrics describe the lifestyles of urban youths, as with "Bebek Beringas" and "Mr. Portal", which describes a person's favorite motorcycle and a conflict with a security guard, respectively. "SDSB (Seputar Dago Seperti Biasa)" describes a night in Dago, Bandung. "Main Serong" is about infidelity. "Gembel Cinta" advises the listeners to not hold on to their broken hearts for too long. "Remaja Masa Kini" describes youth delinquency. The same year, they played in The Tarix Jabrix 2, a sequel to The Tarix Jabrix. The last film in which they played, The Tarix Jabrix 3, was released in mid-June 2011.

In mid-2011, Tugas Akhir was released. It drew influence from country, surf rock, and rockabilly. Marcel Thee from Jakarta Globe described the album as "nothing but a waste of soundwaves". He gave "Tari Getar" as an example of a parody which satirizes the big band genre, sounding like a poor version of the classic "Batman Theme". He wrote that the single "Only Love" tried to show breezy nuance, but failed because of Tria’s breathy vocals, which deprived the limp melody of much-needed power. "Filosofi Rock N Roll" apes the dirtier edge of rock, with inspiration taken from Little Richard, complete with distorted vocals draped in heavy reverb. On "Surfing Di Arab" the band mixed surf rock and Arabian music, with the result described by Thee as "sounding like the confused lovechild of Dick Dale and Aladdin". Ricky Siahaan of Rolling Stone Indonesia wrote that the album had some funny lyrics, such as in "Bu Lisa", about a student who fell in love with his teacher, and "Mama Papa Pujaan", a compliment to the parents. He described "Cuaca Ekstrim", which is about someone who caught a cold, as having a "serious" tone but "catchy" melody. Its CD cover design resembles a student's final task cover, and illustrates the theme of the album. One single from this album, "Parampampam", was released in January 2011. The lyrics are bilingual and invites the listeners to learn English.

== Styles ==
They describe their musical styles as a mix of rock, funk, punk revival, indie pop, jazz and blues. Kris Putranto from Nu:B Magazine said that their musical styles is similar to The Strokes, noting that the intro of "Racun Dunia" and "I Love u Bibeh" is exactly the same as The Strokes' "Last Nite". Chris True from Allmusic wrote that the band is also influenced by The Beatles, The Doors, Aerosmith, The Stone Roses, and Oasis.

Mariani Dewi from The Jakarta Post said their fashion style gave them a distinct style. They usually wear very tight pants and have old-fashioned hairstyles. Putranto said that their appearances mixed that of The Hives and The Rolling Stones.

== Discography ==
- Mencoba Sukses (2006)
- The Changcuters & Misteri Kalajengking Hitam (2009)
- Tugas Akhir (2011)
- Visualis (2013)
- Binauralis (2016)
- Loyalis (2020)
- Wow Ma (2026)
