= Sophan Sophiaan =

Indonesian actor and politician

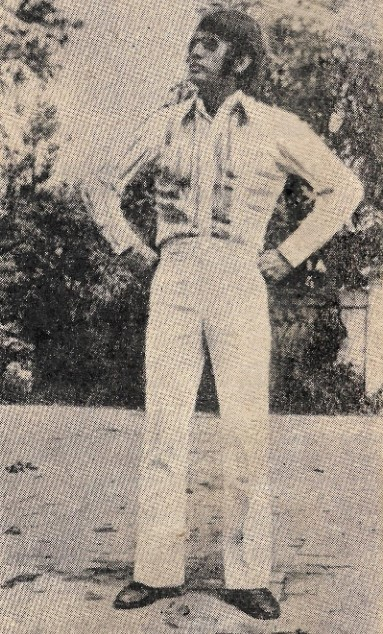
- Aktuil Magazine, 1971
- Born: 26 April 1944; Makassar, South Sulawesi, Japanese-occupied East Indies
- Died: 17 May 2008 (aged 64); Sragen, Central Java, Indonesia
- Occupations: Actor, film director, and politician
- Years active: 1971–2008
- Spouse: Widyawati
- Children: 2

Sophan Sophiaan (26 April 1944 – 17 May 2008) was an Indonesian film actor and politician. He was a member of the Indonesian Democratic Party of Struggle (PDIP).

== Early life ==
Sophiaan was born in the city of Makassar, South Sulawesi, on 26 April 1944. His father was Indonesian politician and diplomat Manai Sophiaan and his grandfather was a former political prisoner called Paiso. His last appearance was in the 2008 film, Love, opposite his real life wife, Indonesian actress, Widyawati.

== Death ==
Sophiaan was killed in a motorcycle accident in Widodaren, Ngawi, on 17 May 2008, at the age of 64. He was participating in a motorcycle parade called "The Route of the National Awakening" to commemorate the 100th anniversary of National Awakening Day when the accident occurred.

The parade, which began in Jakarta on 12 April 2008, was to make stops across Java in the cities of Rengas Dengklok, Cirebon, Pekalongan, Semarang, Rembang, Tuban and Surabaya, before ending in Monas, Jakarta, on 20 May 2008. Sophiaan's accident occurred after he joined in the parade.

He was riding his motorcycle when he struck a large hole in Sragen, near the town's border with Ngawi, at approximately 9:30 A.M. He suffered internal injuries and a broken leg in the accident. Sophiaan died at Sragen Hospital at around 10 A.M. on 17 May 2008.

Former President of Indonesia and chair of the PDIP, Megawati Sukarnoputri, issued a statement expressing condolences after the accident. Sophiaan and Megawati had become colleagues when she founded her PDIP political party.

== Filmography ==
=== Film ===
| Year | Title | Role | Notes |
|---|---|---|---|
| 1971 | Lisa | Harun | |
| 1971 | Pengantin Remaja | Romi | |
| 1971 | Lorong Hitam | Kartono/Kusuma | |
| 1971 | Matahari Hampir Terbenam | Max | |
| 1972 | Perkawinan | Mr. Tok | Leading Role Actor II in Indonesian Film Festival 1973; Runner Up IV Actor (Best Actor/Actress 1972–1973) in PWI Awards |
| 1972 | Tjintaku Djauh Dipulau | Unknown Role | |
| 1972 | Si Bongkok | Gusti | |
| 1972 | Pemberang | Johan Arifin | |
| 1972 | Mutiara Dalam Lumpur | Khalid | |
| 1973 | Pencopet | Abdul Kadir Zailani | |
| 1973 | Anak Yatim | Yeyen's dad | |
| 1973 | Percintaan | Herman/Surya Mulyono | |
| 1973 | Timang-Timang Anakku Sayang | Erwin | |
| 1973 | Perempuan | Hendrawansyah | |
| 1974 | Romi dan Juli | Unknown Role | |
| 1974 | Cinta Remaja | Mirta | |
| 1974 | Aku Cinta Padamu | Baron Isfandari | |
| 1974 | Kehormatan | Iwan | |
| 1974 | Gaun Pengantin | Unknown Role | |
| 1974 | Demi Cinta | Johan | |
| 1975 | Jinak-Jinak Merpati | Dimas | |
| 1976 | Sentuhan Cinta | Toha | |
| 1977 | Rahasia Seorang Ibu | Johan Sitompul | |
| 1977 | Letnan Harahap | Unknown Role | |
| 1980 | Kemilau Kemuning Senja | Andi Bastian | |
| 1980 | Buah Hati Mama | Hendrik Maulana | |
| 1981 | Amalia S.H. | Frans | |
| 1983 | Kadarwati | Unknown Role | |
| 1984 | Saat-Saat Yang Indah | Unknown Role | |
| 1984 | Tinggal Landas Buat Kekasih | Wimar | |
| 1987 | Arini (Masih Ada Kereta yang Akan Lewat) | Helmi | |
| 1988 | Suami | Bram Bahrumsyah | |
| 1989 | Sesaat Dalam Pelukan | Andi | Nominations Citra Award for Best Leading Actor in Indonesian Film Festival 1990 |
| 1990 | Perempuan Kedua | Dr. Yanuar | |
| 1991 | Yang Tercinta | Umar Abdullah | Nominations Citra Award for Best Supporting Actor in Indonesian Film Festival 1991 |
| 1994 | Sesal | Affan Aminullah | |
| 2008 | Love | Nugroho | Favorite Leading Role Actor in Indonesian Movie Awards 2009 |

=== TV series ===
| Year | Title | Role |
|---|---|---|
| 1997-1998 | Abad 21 | Harry Dewanto |
| 1998-1999 | Kemuning | |
| 2008 | Elang | Mr. Piet |

=== Director and Scriptwriter ===
| Year | Title | Role | Notes |
|---|---|---|---|
| 1975 | Jinak-Jinak Merpati | Director | |
| 1976 | Widuri Kekasihku | Director | |
| 1977 | Letnan Harahap | Director | |
| 1978 | Bung Kecil | Director | |
| 1980 | Buah Hati Mama | Director | |
| 1981 | Jangan Ambil Nyawaku | Director | Nominations Citra Award for Best Director in Indonesian Film Festival 1982 |
| 1982 | Bunga Bangsa | Director and Scriptwriter | Nominations Citra Award for Best Stories in Indonesian Film Festival 1983; Nominations Citra Award for Best Scenario in Indonesian Film Festival 1983 |
| 1983 | Kadarwati | Director | |
| 1984 | Saat-Saat Yang Indah | Director and Scriptwriter | |
| 1984 | Tinggal Landas Buat Kekasih | Director and Scriptwriter | Nominations Citra Award for Best Scenario in Indonesian Film Festival 1985 |
| 1985 | Melintas Badai | Director | |
| 1985 | Damai Kami Sepanjang Hari | Director and Scriptwriter | |
| 1986 | Di Balik Dinding Kelabu | Director | |
| 1987 | Arini (Masih Ada Kereta yang Akan Lewat) | Director | Nominations Citra Award for Best Director in Indonesian Film Festival 1987 |
| 1988 | Ayu dan Ayu | Director and Scriptwriter | |
| 1988 | Suami | Director and Producer | |
| 1989 | Sesaat Dalam Pelukan | Director | Nominations Citra Award for Best Director in Indonesian Film Festival 1990 |
| 1991 | Ketika Senyummu Hadir | Director | |
| 1994 | Sesal | Director and Scriptwriter | |

== Awards and nominations ==
| Year | Awards | Category | Film | Results |
|---|---|---|---|---|
| 1973 | PWI Awards | Runner Up IV Actor (Best Actor/Actress 1972–1973) | Perkawinan | Won |
| 1982 | Indonesian Film Festival | Citra Award for Best Director | Jangan Ambil Nyawaku | Nominated |
| 1983 | Indonesian Film Festival | Citra Award for Best Stories | Bunga Bangsa | Nominated |
| 1983 | Indonesian Film Festival | Citra Award for Best Scenario | Bunga Bangsa | Nominated |
| 1985 | Indonesian Film Festival | Citra Award for Best Scenario | Tinggal Landas Buat Kekasih | Nominated |
| 1987 | Indonesian Film Festival | Citra Award for Best Director | Arini (Masih Ada Kereta yang Akan Lewat) | Nominated |
| 1990 | Indonesian Film Festival | Citra Award for Best Director | Sesaat Dalam Pelukan | Nominated |
| 1990 | Indonesian Film Festival | Citra Award for Best Leading Actor | Sesaat Dalam Pelukan | Nominated |
| 1991 | Indonesian Film Festival | Citra Award for Best Supporting Actor | Yang Tercinta | Nominated |
| 2009 | Indonesian Movie Awards | Favorite Leading Role Actor | Love | Won |
