= Zeke and The Popo =

Indonesian band

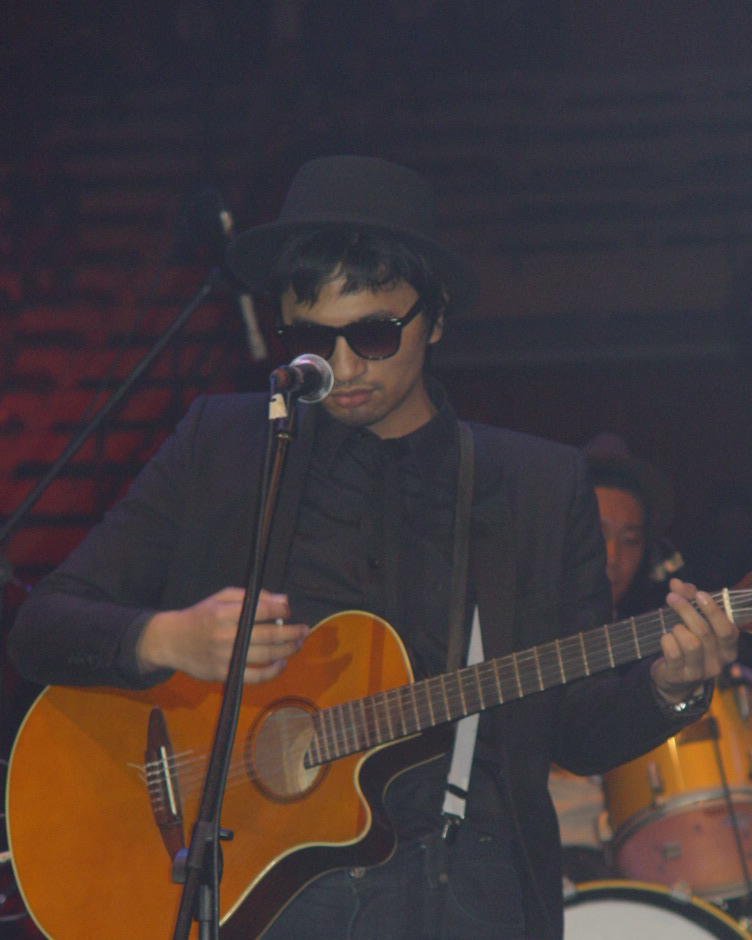
- Zeke Khaseli performing live with Zeke and the Popo at Indiefest vol.3 Final Regional Jakarta

Background information
- Origin: Jakarta, Indonesia
- Genres: Ambient, Folk rock, Psychedelic
- Years active: 2003—present
- Label: Blackmorse Records
- Spinoffs: Salvatore Mamadou
- Members: Zeke Khaseli; Iman Fattah; Amir Kuro; Leonardo Ringo; Yuditia Noor
- Website: http://www.zatpp.com

Zeke and The Popo are an Indonesian ambient/folk rock/psychedelic band from Jakarta. They are an independent band and signed with Blakmorse record.

== History ==
Zeke and The Popo began as a side project from Zeke (vocal, piano, and guitar from the band LAIN) in 2003. Zeke then asked Leonardo Ringo (a.k.a. Mugeni) to jam, and the two quickly felt a chemistry between them to create music together. Not long after, they asked Iman Fattah (a.k.a. Babyfaced) from the band LAIN to play synthesizer. As the trio jammed and played gigs often, they contributed to the J.K.T.S.K.R.G compilation from Aksara records, and this marked the need for a drummer and bass player because the band felt that their music had grown from a three-piece sound-based band to a spacey, ambient layered analog band. Thus, they asked Amir (a.k.a. Kuro) to play drum & Yuditia Noor (a.k.a. Sideburns) to play bass. In November 2003, they performed together for the first time on the first event in Aksara Bookstore Kemang. All of their albums, plus extra tracks, are now available to buy as a digital download at www.buttonijo.com

== Soundtrack ==
In 2005, ZATPP (as the band is also known) contributed 3 of their music to the soundtrack of the film "Joni's Promise" (including a song called "Mighty Love" which was credit to their alter-ego band Salvatore Mamadou) and the film became a major success and so is ZATPP gained a large number of fans during that year. In March 2005, ZATPP released their first EP, "Unrescued World" which contains four songs. It didn't take too long for the CD to sold out. The effect of ZATPP EP's selling created a buzz and generates a large number of followers in Bandung (in a monthly event "Les Voila 2005", which also featured some prominents local acts like Mocca and The S.I.G.I.T, ZATPP attracted more followers).

In November 2006 ZATPP once again contributed a song in the original soundtrack of "6:30". In the launching of the movie, ZATPP performs with their respectable contemporaries, NAIF and Pure Saturday. Aside from the music project, Zeke was also a composer of a film score and a music director of "KALA" directed by Joko Anwar ( "Joni's Promise" director). Zeke also directed the Space in the Headlines' single music video, making the best out of his film education in London. In 2007, Zeke successfully launch a "KALA" original soundtrack together with Zeke and the Popo debut album, "Space in the Headlines" under Black Morse Records. The first single released from "KALA" original soundtrack was "Hope Killer" which is also recognized as the teaser for "Space in the Headlines". In Space in the Headlines, ZATPP offers richer and more organic sounds compared to their previous EP. However, for the listener it would not be hard to recognize the trade mark spacey soundscape that's ZATPPesque.

== Music and style ==
Zeke and The Popo is known in the local independent music scene for its sound, arrangements and stage act. The band often uses visual displays when it performs.

== Album ==
- Unrescued World (EP)
- Space in The Headline
- Janji Joni Original Soundtrack
- Kala Original Soundtrack
- J.K.T.S.K.R.G. Compilation album
