= Kinaryosih =

Indonesian actress and model (born 1979)

- Born: Kinaryosih Money; 3 March 1979 (age 47); Jakarta, Indonesia
- Occupations: Celebrity, Model
- Years active: 1997 - present
- Awards: 1 Citra Award

Kinaryosih (born 3 March 1979) is an Indonesian actress and model from Jakarta.

== Biography ==
Kinaryosih was born on 3 March 1979. In 1997, then a model, she won Femina magazine's annual competition for "Face of Femina". She began her acting career with appearances in television, including the soap operas Perkawinan Sedarah (Wedding the Same Blood), Indahnya Cinta (The Beauty of Love), Aku Cinta Kamu (I Love You), and Wulan.

In 2005 Kinaryosih began dating Brett Lee Money, an Australian. The pair raced together in the second season of The Amazing Race Asia in 2007, in which they placed ninth.

One of Kinaryosih's most critically acclaimed roles was in 2006's Mendadak Dangdut (Suddenly Dangdut), in which she played Yulia, the sister-cum-manager of a singer played by Titi Kamal. For the role, she won a Citra Award for Best Supporting Actress at the 2006 Indonesian Film Festival, as well as similar awards at the 2007 Bandung Film Festival and Indonesian Movie Awards (IMA), she also won Favourite Supporting Actress at the IMA.

In 2009 Kinaryosih starred in The Real Pocong as the titular pocong, or shrouded ghost. She performed her own stunts in the film. That same year she played a woman who stole her best friend's husband in Kata Maaf Terakhir (The Last Apology). Nauval Yazid, writing in The Jakarta Post, found her performance mediocre. This was followed by a role as a shopkeeper named Ina in Maling Kutang (The Bra Thief), a story about villagers who attempt to steal a bra perceived to have magical powers from atop Ina's house.

Kinaryosih received another award in 2010 from Femina as one of the 25 most successful "Face of Femina" competitors.

In March 2011, Kinaryosih and Brett Money married in secret ceremonies in Australia and in Jakarta. Before marriage Brett Money had converted to Islam. Together they have a son, Steven, who was born on 27 March 2012.
