= 12th Jogja-NETPAC Asian Film Festival =

2017 film festival

- Opening film: Nyai by Garin Nugroho
- Closing film: Pop Aye by Kirsten Tan
- Location: Yogyakarta, Indonesia
- Festival date: 1–8 December 2017
- Website: jaff-filmfest.org

Jogja-NETPAC Asian Film Festival
- 13th 11th

The 12th Jogja-NETPAC Asian Film Festival was held from 1 to 8 December 2017 in Yogyakarta, Indonesia. A total of 114 films from 24 countries were screened during the festival. Garin Nugroho's Nyai opened the festival and it closed with Kirsten Tan's drama film Pop Aye. The year's edition included a new competition section called Indonesian Screen Awards which honored the achievement of Indonesian feature films.

The festival's most prestigious award, Golden Hanoman Award, was presented to drama film The Seen and Unseen by Kamila Andini.

== Official selection ==
=== Opening and closing films ===
English title	Original title	Director(s)	Production countrie(s)
Nyai (opening film)		Garin Nugroho	Indonesia
Pop Aye (closing film)		Kirsten Tan	Singapore, Thailand

=== Asian Feature ===
English title	Original title	Director(s)	Production countrie(s)
Golden Hanoman Award
A Father's Will	Atanyn Kereezi	Bakyt Mukul, Dastan Zhapar Uulu	Kyrgyzstan
By the Time It Gets Dark	ดาวคะนอง	Anocha Suwichakornpong	Thailand, Netherlands, France, Qatar
Dark Is the Night	Madilim ang Gabi	Adolfo Alix Jr.	Philippines
Lady of the Lake	Loktak Lairembee	Haobam Paban Kumar	India
Marlina the Murderer in Four Acts	Marlina Si Pembunuh dalam Empat Babak	Mouly Surya	Indonesia, France, Hong Kong, Malaysia, Thailand
People Power Bombshell: The Diary of Vietnam Rose		John Torres	Philippines
The Plague at the Karatas Village	Қаратас ауылындағы оба	Adilkhan Yerzhanov	Kazakhstan
The Seen and Unseen	Sekala Niskala	Kamila Andini	Indonesia, Australia, Netherlands, Qatar
Sunshine that Can Move Mountains	被阳光移动的山脉	Qiang Wang	Tibet
NETPAC Award and Geber Award
Bangkok Joyride: Chapter 2 - Shutdown Bangkok		Ing Kanjanavanit	Thailand
Blockage	سد معبر	Mohsen Gharaie	Iran
Burning Birds	දැවෙන විහඟුන්	Sanjeewa Pushpakumara	Sri Lanka, France
In the Flesh		Kong Pahurak	Thailand, Japan
Love and Shukla		Jatla Siddartha	India
Phantom of Illumination	นิรันดร์ราตรี	Wattanapume Laisuwanchai	Thailand
Tarling Is Darling		Ismail Fahmi Lubis	Indonesia
We, the Dead	Aqérat	Edmund Yeo	Malaysia
The White Girl	白色女孩	Jenny Suen, Christopher Doyle	Hong Kong, Malaysia
Yamato (California)	大和（カリフォルニア）	Daisuke Miyazaki	Japan

=== Asian Perspectives ===
English title	Original title	Director(s)	Production countrie(s)
A Letter to the President	نامه‌ای به رییس‌جمهور	Roya Sadat	Afghanistan
The Children of Genghis	Chingisiin huuhduud	Zolbayar Dorj	Mongolia
Kupal		Kazem Mollaie	Iran
Last Laugh	喜丧	Zhang Tao	China, France, Hong Kong
Love and Other Cults	獣道	Eiji Uchida	Japan
Sound of Silence		Bijukumar Damodaran	India
Sveta	Света	Zhanna Issabayeva	Kazakhstan
Village Rockstars	ভিলেজ ৰকষ্টাৰ্ছ	Rima Das	India
Women of the Weeping River		Sheron Dayoc	Philippines

=== Indonesian Screen Awards ===
English title	Original title	Director(s)
Aisyah: Biarkan Kami Bersaudara		Herwin Novianto
Bukaan 8		Angga Dwimas Sasongko
Check the Store Next Door	Cek Toko Sebelah	Ernest Prakasa
Galih & Ratna		Lucky Kuswandi
The Gift		Hanung Bramantyo
My Generation		Upi Avianto
Negeri Dongeng		Anggi Frisca
Night Bus		Emil Heradi
Posesif		Edwin
Satu Hari Nanti		Salman Aristo

=== Asian Docs ===
English title	Original title	Director(s)	Production countrie(s)
All Is Forgiven, for We Have Been Happy	Semua Sudah Dimaafkan Sebab Kita Pernah Bahagia	Katia Engel, Paul Agusta	Indonesia
The Ballads of Cinema Lovers	Balada Bala Sinema	Yuda Kurniawan	Indonesia
Burma Storybook		Petr Lom, Corinne van Egeraat	Netherlands, Norway, Thailand
Eyelashes	Bulu Mata	Tonny Trimarsanto	Indonesia
Mrs. Fang	方绣英	Wang Bing	China, France, Germany, Greece, Hong Kong
My Father, The Last Communist		Đoàn Hồng Lê	Vietnam
Waxing Moon	Quinzaine Claire	Adrien Genoudet	Cambodia
Taiwan Docs
Blood Amber	血琥珀	Lee Yong-chao	Taiwan, Myanmar
Realm of Reverberations	殘響世界	Chen Chieh-jen	Taiwan
Small Talk	日常對話	Huang Hui-zhen	Taiwan

=== Focus on Joko Anwar ===
- Joni's Promise (2005)
- Dead Time: Kala (2007)
- The Forbidden Door (2009)
- Ritual (2012)
- A Copy of My Mind (2015)
- Satan's Slaves (2017)

== Awards ==
The following awards were presented at the festival:

- Golden Hanoman Award: The Seen and Unseen by Kamila Andini
- Silver Hanoman Award: By the Time It Gets Dark by Anocha Suwichakornpong
- Special Mention: Marlina the Murderer in Four Acts by Mouly Surya
- NETPAC Award: Love and Shukla by Jatla Siddartha
- Geber Award: We, the Dead by Edmund Yeo
- Blencong Award: My Father's Room by Nari Jang
- Jogja Film Student Award: Tradition by Lanka Bandaranayake
- JAFF Indonesian Screen Awards
  - Best Film: Posesif by Edwin
  - Best Short Film: Sunday Story by Adi Marsono
  - Best Directing: Ernest Prakasa for Check the Store Next Door
  - Best Storytelling: Fathan Todjon for Galih & Ratna
  - Best Cinematography: Batara Goempar for Posesif
  - Best Performance: Putri Marino for Posesif
