= Indonesian Screen Awards =

Indonesian film awards

The Indonesian Screen Awards is a competitive section held during the Jogja-NETPAC Asian Film Festival. The section honors achievements in Indonesian cinema across six categories, Best Film, Best Directing, Best Performance, Best Editing, and Best Storytelling. Short films were also part of the competition during the inaugural edition in 2017.

== Official selection ==
‡ denotes the film that had its world premiere during the competition.

Feature films

Year	Film	Director	Ref.
2017	Posesif	Edwin	
2017	Aisyah: Biarkan Kami Bersaudara	Herwin Novianto	
2017	Bukaan 8	Angga Dwimas Sasongko	
2017	Check the Store Next Door	Ernest Prakasa	
2017	Galih & Ratna	Lucky Kuswandi	
2017	The Gift‡	Hanung Bramantyo	
2017	My Generation	Upi Avianto	
2017	Negeri Dongeng	Anggi Frisca	
2017	Night Bus	Emil Heradi	
2017	Satu Hari Nanti	Salman Aristo	
2018	Petualangan Menangkap Petir	Kuntz Agus	
2018	Aruna & Her Palate	Edwin	
2018	Cemara's Family‡	Yandy Laurens	
2018	If This Is My Story‡	Djenar Maesa Ayu, Kan Lumé	
2018	Love for Sale	Andibachtiar Yusuf	
2018	Sultan Agung Mataram 1628	Hanung Bramantyo	
2018	Ten Seconds Before Sunrise	Teddy Soeriaatmadja	
2018	Wage	John de Rantau	
2019	Two Blue Stripes	Gina S. Noer	
2019	DoReMi & You	B. W. Purbanegara	
2019	Gundala	Joko Anwar	
2019	Humba Dreams	Riri Riza	
2019	Love for Sale 2	Andibachtiar Yusuf	
2019	Mecca I'm Coming‡	Jeihan Angga	
2019	Susi Susanti: Love All	Sim F	
2021	Kadet 1947	Rahabi Mandra, Aldo Swastia	
2021	Akhirat: A Love Story‡	Jason Iskandar	
2021	Aum!	Bambang "Ipoenk" Kuntara Mukti	
2021	Everyday Is a Lullaby	Putrama Tuta	
2021	Just Mom	Jeihan Angga	
2021	Losmen Bu Broto	Eddie Cahyono, Ifa Isfansyah	
2021	Paranoia	Riri Riza	
2021	Preman: Silent Fury	Randolph Zaini	
2021	Teka-Teki Tika	Ernest Prakasa	
2021	The Wheel of Life‡	Arief Malinmudo	
2022	The Exiles‡	Lola Amaria	
2022	The Ballads of Roy	Fajar Nugros	
2022	Cross the Line	Razka Robby Ertanto	
2022	Galang	Adriyanto Dewo	
2022	History of Untellable Tales‡	B. W. Purbanegara	
2022	Orpa‡	Theo Rumansara	
2022	The Portrait of a Nightmare	Ismail Basbeth	
2022	Sahara‡	Zhaddam Aldhy Nurdin	
2022	Sound from the Sea	Khusnul Khitam	
2022	Stealing Raden Saleh	Angga Dwimas Sasongko	
2022	The Tone of Wheels	Yuda Kurniawan	
2023	The Draft!‡	Yusron Fuadi	
2023	Ali Topan	Sidharta Tata	
2023	Falling In Love Like In Movies‡	Yandy Laurens	
2023	Monster‡	Rako Prijanto	
2023	The Prize	Paul Fauzan Agusta	
2023	Sara	Ismail Basbeth	
2023	Sleep Call	Fajar Nugros	
2023	Women from Rote Island	Jeremias Nyangoen	
2024	Yohanna	Razka Robby Ertanto	
2024	All We Need Is Time‡	Teddy Soeriaatmadja	
2024	Goodbye, Farewell	Adriyanto Dewo	
2024	Love Unlike in K-Dramas‡	Meira Anastasia	
2024	Malam Pertobatan	Dyan Sunu Prastowo	
2024	The Queen of Witchcraft‡	Fajar Nugros	
2025	Better Off Dead	Kristo Immanuel	
2025	A Thousand Shades of Purnama	Yahdi Jamhur	
2025	Agak Laen: Menyala Pantiku!	Muhadkly Acho	
2025	Dancing with the Body‡	Andi Imam Prakasa	
2025	Dopamine	Teddy Soeria Atmadja	
2025	Ikatan Darah	Sidharta Tata	
2025	Mothernet	Ho Wi-ding	
2025	The Period of Her	Erlina Rakhmawati, Praditha Blifa, Sarah Adilah, Yulinda Dwi Andriyani	
2025	Rangga & Cinta	Riri Riza	
2025	Smothered	Kevin Rahardjo, Rafki Hidayat	
2025	Sore: Wife from the Future	Yandy Laurens	
2025	The Tiger‡	Ardiansah Sulistiana	
2025	Worn Out‡	Misya Latief	
2026	The Art of Seducing God	Cesa David Luckmansyah	
2026	Bara & the Secret Forest‡	Eman Pradipta	
2026	Coming Home	Bene Dion Rajagukguk	
2026	I Saw Her in Motion	Umi Lestari	
2026	Jani Be Good	Ariani Darmawan	
2026	Mate's Rate	Andrew Kose	
2026	My Mother	Eddie Cahyono	
2026	Philosophy of the Porch‡	Affandi Abdul Rachman	
2026	Secrets‡	Ravi Bharwani	
2026	Shattered Vows‡	Ferdinand Almi	

Short films

Year	Film	Director	Ref.
2017	Sunday Story	Adi Marsono	
2017	Along the One Way	Bani Nasution	
2017	Joko	Suryo Wiyogo	
2017	Mesin Tanah	Wimar Herdanto	
2017	The Nameless Boy	Diego Batara Mahameru	
2017	Pilgrimage to Mecca	Rivandy Adi Kuswara	
2017	Regards from the Southern Crab	Zhafran Solichin	
2017	Signs of the Season	Ninndi Raras	
2017	Songbird: Burung Berkicau	Wisnu Surya Pratama	

== Awards ==
=== Best Film ===
Year	Film	Director	Ref.
2017	Posesif	Edwin	
2018	Petualangan Menangkap Petir	Kuntz Agus	
2019	Two Blue Stripes	Gina S. Noer	
2021	Kadet 1947	Rahabi Mandra and Aldo Swastia	
2022	The Exiles	Lola Amaria	
2023	The Draft!	Yusron Fuadi	
2024	Yohanna	Razka Robby Ertanto	
2025	Better Off Dead	Kristo Immanuel	

=== Best Directing ===
Year	Director(s)	Film
2017	Ernest Prakasa	Check the Store Next Door
2018	Hanung Bramantyo	Sultan Agung Mataram 1628
2019	Gina S. Noer	Two Blue Stripes
2021	Rahabi Mandra and Aldo Swastia	Kadet 1947
2021	Honorary Mention: Bambang "Ipoenk" Kuntara Mukti	Aum!
2022	Adriyanto Dewo	Galang
2023	Ismail Basbeth	Sara
2024	Razka Robby Ertanto	Yohanna
2025	Kristo Immanuel	Better Off Dead

=== Best Performance ===
Year	Actors	Film
2017	Putri Marino	Posesif
2018	Reza Rahadian	If This Is My Story
2019	Laura Basuki	Susi Susanti: Love All
2021	Putri Marino	Losmen Bu Broto
2022	Orsila Murib	Orpa
2022	Rafli Anwar Mursadad	Sound from the Sea
2023	Irma Rihi	Women from Rote Island
2024	Laura Basuki	Yohanna
2024	Kirana Putri Grasela	Yohanna
2024	Iqua Tahlequa	Yohanna
2025	Afiqa Kirana	The Period of Her
2025	Omara Esteghlal	Better Off Dead

=== Best Cinematography ===
Year	Winner	Film
2017	Batara Goempar	Posesif
2018	Amalia T. S.	Aruna & Her Palate
2019	Yunus Pasolang	Susi Susanti: Love All
2021	Ujel Bausad	Aum!
2022	Yudi Datau	Sound from the Sea
2023	Joseph Christoforus Fofid	Women from Rote Island
2024	Odyssey Flores	Yohanna
2025	Vera Lestafa	Dopamine

=== Best Screenplay ===
Year	Winners	Film
2017	Fathan Todjon and Lucky Kuswandi	Galih & Ratna
2018	Andibachtiar Yusuf and M. Irfan Ramli	Love for Sale
2019	Gina S. Noer	Two Blue Stripes
2021	Randolph Zaini	Preman: Silent Fury
2022	Tumpal Tampubolon	Galang
2023	Anindita Suryarasmi and Yusron Fuadi	The Draft!
2024	Razka Robby Ertanto	Yohanna
2025	Kristo Immanuel and Jessica Tjiu	Better Off Dead

=== Best Editing ===
Year	Winner	Film
2022	Yuda Kurniawan	The Tone of Wheels
2023	Ridwan A. B. and Yusron Fuadi	The Draft!
2024	Akhmad Fesdi Anggoro	The Queen of Witchcraft
2025	Ryan Purwoko	Better Off Dead

=== Best Music ===
Year	Winner	Film
2025	Anto Hoed and Melly Goeslaw	Rangga & Cinta

=== Best Sound Design ===
Year	Winner	Film
2025	Pramudya Adhy Wardhana, Ridho Fachri, Renaldy Lomo, Alexandrie Dolly, Luthfi AG, Iqbal "Encik" Marekan, Halid Ilham, and Ikhsan Nugroho	The Period of Her

=== Best Production Design ===
Year	Winner	Film
2025	Ahmad Zulkarnaen and Wahyu Efata	Ikatan Darah

=== Best Poster ===
Year	Winner	Film
2025	Evan Wijaya and Jozz Felix	Sore: Wife from the Future

=== Best Short Film ===
Year	Film	Director
2017	Sunday Story	Adi Marsono
