= 2018 Indonesian Film Festival =

Award ceremony for films of 2018

Indonesian Film Festival
- Date: 9 December 2018
- Site: Teater Besar Ismail Marzuki Park, Jakarta
- Hosted by: Rory Asyari; Maudy Koesnaedi
- Preshow hosts: Alvin Adam; Melanie Putria; Jason Sambouw

Highlights
- Best Picture: Marlina the Murderer in Four Acts
- Most awards: Marlina the Murderer in Four Acts (10)
- Most nominations: Marlina the Murderer in Four Acts (14)

Television coverage
- Network: MetroTV

The 38th Citra Awards honored the achievement in Indonesian cinema released from 1 October 2017 to 30 September 2018. The ceremony was held on 9 December 2018 at the Teater Besar Ismail Marzuki Park, Jakarta, Indonesia, and presented by journalist Rory Asyari and actress Maudy Koesnaedi.

Thriller film Marlina the Murderer in Four Acts won ten awards out of fourteen nominations, including Best Picture. Others winners include 212 Warrior with three, Aruna & Her Palate with two and The Seen and Unseen, Love for Sale, Run to the Beach, A Gift, Si Juki the Movie: Panitia Hari Akhir, Rising from Silence and The Song of Grassroots with one.

== Winners and nominees ==
The nominations were announced on 9 November 2018 at the La Moda Café, Plaza Indonesia, Jakarta. The nominations were led by Marlina the Murderer in Four Acts with fifteen nominations, followed by Aruna & Her Palate with nine.

Winners are listed first, highlighted in boldface, and indicated with a double dagger (‡).

**Best Picture**: **Marlina the Murderer in Four Acts – Rama Adi and Fauzan Zidni**‡; Aruna & Her Palate – Muhammad Zaidy and Meiske Taurisia; The Seen and Unseen – Ifa Isfansyah and Gita Fara; Sultan Agung Mataram 1628 – Mooryati Soedibyo, Putri Kuswisnuwardhani and Haryo Tedjo Baskoro	**Best Director**: **Mouly Surya – Marlina the Murderer in Four Acts**‡; Edwin – Aruna & Her Palate; Kamila Andini – The Seen and Unseen
**Best Actor**: **Gading Marten – Love for Sale as Richard**‡; Adipati Dolken – #FriendsButMarried as Ditto; Ario Bayu – Sultan Agung Mataram 1628 as Sultan Agung Hanyakrakusuma; Iqbaal Ramadhan – Dilan 1990 as Dilan; Oka Antara – Aruna & Her Palate as Farish; Vino G. Bastian – Chrisye as Chrisye	**Best Actress**: **Marsha Timothy – Marlina the Murderer in Four Acts as Marlina**‡; Della Dartyan – Love for Sale as Arini; Dian Sastrowardoyo – Aruna & Her Palate as Aruna; Prisia Nasution – Lima as Fara; Putri Ayudya – Kafir: A Deal with the Devil as Sri
**Best Supporting Actor**: **Nicholas Saputra – Aruna & Her Palate as Bono**‡; Egi Fedly – Marlina the Murderer in Four Acts as Marcus; Ence Bagus – Guru Ngaji as Parmin; Marthino Lio – Sultan Agung Mataram 1628 as Sultan Agung Hanyakrakusuma; Teuku Rifnu Wikana – Wage as Fritz; Yoga Pratama – Marlina the Murderer in Four Acts as Franz	**Best Supporting Actress**: **Dea Panendra – Marlina the Murderer in Four Acts as Novi**‡; Ayu Laksmi – The Seen and Unseen as Mother; Dewi Irawan – Ayat-Ayat Cinta 2 as Katarina; Hannah Al Rashid – Aruna & Her Palate as Nadezhda; Karina Suwandi – May the Devil Take You as Laksmi Surya; Ruth Marini – 212 Warrior as Sinto Gendeng
**Best Original Screenplay**: **Marlina the Murderer in Four Acts – Mouly Surya and Rama Adi**‡; Koki-Koki Cilik – Vera Varidia; Love for Sale – Andibachtiar Yusuf and M. Irfan Ramli; Run to the Beach – Gina S. Noer, Mira Lesmana, Riri Riza and Arie Kriting; The Seen and Unseen – Kamila Andini	**Best Adapted Screenplay**: **Aruna & Her Palate – Titien Wattimena; based on the novel by Laksmi Pamuntjak**‡; #FriendsButMarried – Johanna Wattimena and Upi; based on the novel by Ayudia Bing Slamet and Ditto Percussion; Si Doel the Movie – Rano Karno; based on the characters of television series Si Doel Anak Sekolahan by Karno
**Best Cinematography**: **Marlina the Murderer in Four Acts – Yunus Pasolang**‡; 212 Warrior – Ipung Rachmat Syaiful; May the Devil Take You – Batara Goempar; The Seen and Unseen – Anggi Frisca; Wage – Hani Pradigya	**Best Editing**: **Marlina the Murderer in Four Acts – Kelvin Nugroho**‡; Aruna & Her Palate – W. Ichwandiardono; Hujan Bulan Juni – Cesa David Luckmansyah; May the Devil Take You – Teguh Raharjo; The Seen and Unseen – Dinda Amanda and Dwi Agus Purwanto
**Best Sound**: **Marlina the Murderer in Four Acts – Khikmawan Santosa and Yusuf A. Pattawari**‡; 212 Warrior – Aria Prayogi and M. Ichsan Rachmaditta; The Seen and Unseen – Trisno, Hadrianus Eko and Yasuhiro Morinaga; Sultan Agung Mataram 1628 – Satrio Budiono and Krisna Purna	**Best Visual Effects**: **212 Warrior – Keliek Wicaksono**‡; 22 Minutes – Geppetto Animation; Kafir: A Deal with the Devil – Canary Project; Marlina the Murderer in Four Acts – Danny S. Kim and Teguh Raharjo; Sultan Agung Mataram 1628 – x. Jo and Hery Kuntoro
**Best Original Score**: **Marlina the Murderer in Four Acts – Zeke Khaseli and Yudhi Arfani**‡; 212 Warrior – Aria Prayogi; Aruna & Her Palate – Ken Jenie and Mar Galo; Kafir: A Deal with the Devil – Aghi Narrotama, Bemby Gusti and Tony Setiaji; Run to the Beach – Aksan Sjuman	**Best Original Song**: **Kulari ke Pantai" from Run to the Beach – Music and Lyrics by Rayi Putra, Astono Handoko and Anindyo Baskoro; Performed by RAN**‡; "Juara" from Naura & the Champions – Music and Lyrics by Tantra Numata and Mhala Numata; Performed by Naura Ayu; "Rindu Sendiri" from Dilan 1990 – Music and Lyrics by Tarapti Ikhtiar Rinrin and Muhammad Abbidzar Nur Fauzan; Performed by Iqbaal Ramadhan; "Teman tapi Menikah" from #FriendsButMarried – Music and Lyrics by Ade Avery, Jessi Mates and Ayudia Bing Slamet; Performed by Dengarkan Dia
**Best Art Direction**: **Marlina the Murderer in Four Acts – Frans XR Paat**‡; 212 Warrior – Adrianto Sinaga; Kafir: A Deal with the Devil – Frans XR Paat; Sultan Agung Mataram 1628 – Allan Sebastian and Edy Wibowo; Wage – Frans XR Paat	**Best Costume Design**: **212 Warrior – Adrianto Sinaga and Nadia Adharina**‡; Chrisye – Gemailla Gea Geriantiana; Marlina the Murderer in Four Acts – Meutia Pudjowarsito; Wage – Bambang Sugiarto
**Best Makeup**: **212 Warrior – Jerry Octavianus**‡; Marlina the Murderer in Four Acts – Didin Syamsudin; May the Devil Take You – Novie Ariyanti; Sultan Agung Mataram 1628 – Darto Unge; Wage – Retno Astuti	**Best Live Action Short Film**: **A Gift – Aditya Ahmad**‡; Against the Flow – Eka Saputri; Har – Luhki Herwanayogi; Joko – Suryo Wiyogo; Melodi's Elegy – Jason Iskandar; Merged with the Ground – Imam Syafi'i; Siko – Manuel Alberto Maia
**Best Documentary Feature**: **The Song of Grassroots – Yuda Kurniawan**‡; Islands of Faith – Chairun Nissa; Lakardowo Mencari Keadilan – Linda Nursanti	**Best Documentary Short Film**: **Rising from Silence – Shalahuddin Siregar**‡; Andreas: Melawan Realitas – Protus Hyasintus Asalang and Handrianus Koli Basa Belolon; Deathcrow 48 – Saul Manurung; Di Bawah Langit yang Sama – Adih Saputra; Lahir di Darat, Besar di Laut – Steven Vicky Sumbodo; Neraka di Telapak Kaki – Sarah Adilah; O-Sepig – Agnes Michelle; Pagi yang Sungsang – Pingkan Persitya Polla; Still Sway on Sanleko – Rahung Nasution and Yogi Fuad; Tour on Mud – Winner Wijaya
**Best Animated Feature**: **Si Juki the Movie – Faza Meonk**‡; The Awakening Lullaby – Sendika R.; Keluarga Satu Setengah – Michaela Clarissa Devi; Knight Kris – William Fajito and Antonius; Terrorvision 3000 – Percelote Galactic; Thank You – Benvenuto Lucano Athallah	**Lifetime Achievement Award**: **Widyawati**

=== Films with multiple nominations and awards ===
Films that received multiple nominations
Nominations	Film
15	Marlina the Murderer in Four Acts
9	Aruna & Her Palate
8	212 Warrior
7	The Seen and Unseen
7	Sultan Agung Mataram 1628
5	Wage
4	Kafir: A Deal with the Devil
4	May the Devil Take You
3	#FriendsButMarried
3	Love for Sale
3	Run to the Beach
2	Chrisye
2	Dilan 1990

Films that received multiple awards
Awards	Film
10	Marlina the Murderer in Four Acts
3	212 Warrior
2	Aruna & Her Palate
