= 13th Jogja-NETPAC Asian Film Festival =

2018 film festival

- Opening film: The Man from the Sea by Koji Fukada
- Closing film: Her. Him. The Other. by Asoka Handagama, Vimukthi Jayasundara, and Prasanna Vithanage
- Location: Yogyakarta, Indonesia
- Festival date: 27 November–4 December 2018
- Website: jaff-filmfest.org

Jogja-NETPAC Asian Film Festival
- 14th 12th

The 13th Jogja-NETPAC Asian Film Festival was held from 27 November to 4 December 2018 in Yogyakarta, Indonesia. A total of 137 films from 27 countries were screened during the festival. Drama film The Man from the Sea opened the festival and it closed with Sri Lankan anthology film Her. Him. The Other. The festival's most prestigious award was presented to drama film 27 Steps of May.

== Official selection ==
=== Opening and closing films ===
English title	Original title	Director(s)	Production countrie(s)
The Man from the Sea (opening film)	Laut	Koji Fukada	Japan, Indonesia, France
Her. Him. The Other (closing film)	තුන්දෙනෙක්	Asoka Handagama, Vimukthi Jayasundara, Prasanna Vithanage	Sri Lanka

=== Asian Features ===
English title	Original title	Director(s)	Production countrie(s)
Golden Hanoman Award
27 Steps of May		Ravi Bharwani	Indonesia
A Land Imagined	幻土	Yeo Siew Hua	Singapore, France, Netherlands
Die Tomorrow		Nawapol Thamrongrattanarit	Thailand
Grit		Cynthia Wade, Sasha Friedlander	United States, Indonesia
In the Claws of a Century Wanting	Sa Palad ng Dantaong Kulang	Jewel Maranan	Philippines, Germany, Qatar
Nervous Translation		Shireen Seno	Philippines
Night God	Түнгі Құдай	Adilkhan Yerzhanov	Kazakhstan
One Cut of the Dead	カメラを止めるな！	Shinichiro Ueda	Japan
The Widowed Witch	北方一片苍茫	Cai Chengjie	China
NETPAC Award and Geber Award
Ave Maryam		Ertanto Robby Soediskam	Indonesia
Goodnight & Goodbye		Yao-tung Wu	Taiwan
Looking for Lucky	寻狗启事	Jiang Jiachen	China
Passage of Life	僕の帰る場所	Akio Fujimoto	Japan, Myanmar
Person Being/in the Nature of a Human	Ema Nudar Umanu	Jonas Rusumalay Diaz, Thomas Henning	Timor Leste
The Red Phallus		Tashi Gyeltshen	Bhutan
The Song of Grassroots	Nyanyian Akar Rumput	Yuda Kurniawan	Indonesia
Strange Colours		Alena Lodkina	Australia
War Crime		Gopal Shivakoti	Nepal

=== Asian Perspectives ===
English title	Original title	Director(s)	Production countrie(s)
An Engineered Dream		Hemant Gaba	India
Asian Three - Fold Mirror 2018: Journey	アジア三面鏡2018 Journey	Degena Yun, Daishi Matsunaga, Edwin	Japan
Balangiga: Howling Wilderness		Khavn	Philippines
Dukun		Dain Said	Malaysia
Father to Son	范保德	Hsiao Ya-chuan	Taiwan
Fly by Night	非常盜	Zahir Omar	Malaysia
Golden Memories		Mahardhika Yudha, Afrian Purnama, Syaiful Anwar	Indonesia
Istri Orang		Dirmawan Hatta	Indonesia
Malila: The Farewell Flower	มะลิลา	Anucha Boonyawatana	Thailand
Old Love	재회	Park Ki-yong	South Korea, Japan
Painting Life		Bijukumar Damodaran	India, United States
Sayakbay	Саякбай	Ernest Abdyjaparov	Kyrgyzstan
Sincerely Yours, Dhaka	ইতি, তোমারই ঢাকা	Various: Tanvir Ahsan; Abdullah Al Noor; Syed Saleh Sobhan Auneem; Krishnendu Chattopadhyay; Golam Kibria Farooki; Mir Mukarram Hossain; Nuhash Humayun; Mahmudul Islam; Rahat Rahman; Robiul Alam Robi; Syed Ahmed Shawki	Bangladesh
Temporary Visa		Ghazi Alqudcy	Singapore, Bosnia and Herzegovina

=== Indonesian Screen Awards ===
English title	Original title	Director(s)
Aruna & Her Palate	Aruna & Lidahnya	Edwin
Cemara's Family	Keluarga Cemara	Yandy Laurens
If This Is My Story		Djenar Maesa Ayu, Kan Lumé
Love for Sale		Andibachtiar Yusuf
Petualangan Menangkap Petir		Kuntz Agus
Sultan Agung Mataram 1628	Sultan Agung: Tahta, Perjuangan, Cinta	Hanung Bramantyo
Ten Seconds Before Sunrise	Menunggu Pagi	Teddy Soeriaatmadja
Wage		John de Rantau

=== Focus on Garin Nugroho ===
- Aku Ingin Menciummu Sekali Saja (2002)
- Cinta dalam Sepotong Roti (1990)
- Guru Bangsa: Tjokroaminoto (2015)
- Mata Tertutup (2011)
- Memories of My Body (2018)
- Opera Jawa (2006)
- Puisi Tak Terkuburkan (1999)
- Surat untuk Bidadari (1994)

== Awards ==
The following awards were presented at the festival:

- Golden Hanoman Award: 27 Steps of May by Ravi Bharwani
- Silver Hanoman Award: Nervous Translation by Shireen Seno
- NETPAC Award: The Song of Grassroots by Yuda Kurniawan
- Geber Award: Passage of Life by Akio Fujimoto
- Blencong Award: Facing Death with Wirecutter by Sarwar Abdullah
- JAFF Indonesian Screen Awards
  - Best Film: Petualangan Menangkap Petir by Kuntz Agus
  - Best Directing: Hanung Bramantyo for Sultan Agung Mataram 1628
  - Best Cinematography: Amalia T.S. for Aruna & Her Palate
  - Best Performance: Reza Rahadian – If This Is My Story
  - Best Storytelling: Andibachtiar Yusuf and M. Irfan Ramli for Love for Sale
