= 11th Jogja-NETPAC Asian Film Festival =

2016 film festival

- Opening film: Salawaku by Pritagita Arianegara
- Closing film: Travelling with the Bomb by Nurlan Abdykadyrov
- Location: Yogyakarta, Indonesia
- Festival date: 28 November–3 December 2016
- Website: jaff-filmfest.org

Jogja-NETPAC Asian Film Festival
- 12th 10th

The 11th Jogja-NETPAC Asian Film Festival took place from 28 November to 3 December 2016 in Yogyakarta, Indonesia. A total of 138 films from 27 countries were screened during the festival. The festival opened with Pritagita Arianegara's feature directorial debut Salawaku and closed with Nurlan Abdykadyrov's Travelling with the Bomb.

The festival's most prestigious award, Golden Hanoman Award, was presented to drama film Solo, Solitude by Yosep Anggi Noen.

== Official selection ==
=== Opening and closing films ===
| English title | Original title | Director(s) | Production countrie(s) |
|---|---|---|---|
| Salawaku (opening film) | | Pritagita Arianegara | Indonesia |
| Travelling with the Bomb (closing film) | | Nurlan Abdykadyrov | Kyrgyzstan |

=== Asian Features ===
| English title | Original title | Director(s) | Production countrie(s) |
Golden Hanoman Award
| City of Jade | | Midi Z | Taiwan, Myanmar |
| Daughters of the Three Tailed Banner | | Gutierrez Mangansakan II | Philippines |
| hUsh | | Djenar Maesa Ayu, Kan Lume | Indonesia, Singapore |
| The Island Funeral | มหาสมุทรและสุสาน | Pimpaka Towira | Thailand |
| Mrs. | | Adolfo Alix Jr. | Philippines |
| Solo, Solitude | Istirahatlah Kata-Kata | Yosep Anggi Noen | Indonesia |
NETPAC Award and Geber Award
| Canine | Sihung | Esa Hari Akbar | Indonesia |
| Good Morning | ԲԱՐԻ ԼՈՒՅՍ | Anna Arevshatyan | Armenia |
| Interchange | | Dain Iskandar Said | Malaysia, Indonesia |
| KFC | | Lê Bình Giang | Vietnam |
| Knife in the Clear Water | 清水里的刀子 | Wang Xuebo | China |
| Leftovers | Turah | Wicaksono Wisnu Legowo | Indonesia |
| Lowlife Love | 下衆の愛 | Eiji Uchida | Japan, United Kingdom |
| Pako | | Walid Taher | Iraq |
| Red Butterfly Dream | Rathu Samanala Heenayak | Priyantha Kaluarachchi | Sri Lanka |
| Singing in Graveyards | | Bradley Liew | Malaysia, Philippines |
| Sunya | | Harry Dagoe Suharyadi | Indonesia |
| Tales of the Otherwords | Ziarah | B. W. Purbanegara | Indonesia |
| When the Woods Bloom | Kaadu Pookkunna Neram | Dr. Biju | India |
| A Yellow Bird | | K. Rajagopal | Singapore, France |
Out of competition
| Alone In a Valley | නිම්නයක හුදකලාව | Boodee Keerthisena | Sri Lanka |
| Emma' | Athirah | Riri Riza | Indonesia |
| Flights Through Darkness | | Wong Kwang Han | Singapore |
| Old Stone | 老石 | Johnny Ma | Canada, China |

=== Asian Docs ===
| English title | Original title | Director(s) | Production countrie(s) |
|---|---|---|---|
| Doglegs | | Heath Cozens | Japan, United States, Canada |
| Portraits of Mosquito Press | | JL Burgos | Philippines |
| Selfie | | Juan Ibesh | Syria, Germany |
| Singapore Minstrel | | Ng Xi Jie | Singapore |
| Still and All | | Kim Young-jo | South Korea |
| Voyage to Terengganu | Kisah Pelayaran ke Terengganu | Amir Muhammad, Badrul Hisham Ismail | Malaysia |

=== The Faces of Indonesian Cinema Today ===
| English title | Original title | Director(s) |
|---|---|---|
| Catatan Dodol Calon Dokter | | Ifa Isfansyah |
| Moammar Emka's Jakarta Undercover | | Fajar Nugros |
| My Stupid Boss | | Upi Avianto |
| Rudy Habibie | | Hanung Bramantyo |
| Tiga Dara (1956) | | Usmar Ismail |
| Warkop DKI Reborn: Jangkrik Boss! Part 1 | | Anggy Umbara |

=== Islandscape: Asia–Pacific Films ===
| English title | Original title | Director(s) | Production countrie(s) |
|---|---|---|---|
| Made In Taiwan (2006) | | Dan Salmon | New Zealand |
| Moana Rua: The Rising of the Sea | | Vilsoni Hereniko | Fiji |
| The Pa Boys | | Himiona Grace | New Zealand |
| The Price of Peace | | Kim Webby | New Zealand |

=== Korean Cuts ===
| English title | Original title | Director(s) | Production countrie(s) |
|---|---|---|---|
| One Way Trip | 글로리데이 | Choi Jung-yeol | South Korea |
| Train to Busan | 부산행 | Yeon Sang-ho | South Korea |
| The Wailing | 곡성 | Na Hong-jin | South Korea |
| Worst Woman | 최악의 | Kim Jong-kwan | South Korea |

=== Connect Japan ===
| English title | Original title | Director(s) | Production countrie(s) |
|---|---|---|---|
| Bangkok Nites | バンコクナイツ | Katsuya Tomita | Japan, France, Laos, Thailand |
| Chihayafuru Part 1 | ちはやふる 上の句 | Norihiro Koizumi | Japan |
| Chihayafuru Part 2 | ちはやふる 下の句 | Norihiro Koizumi | Japan |
| The Cockpit | | Sho Miyake | Japan |
| Creepy | クリーピー 偽りの隣人 | Kiyoshi Kurosawa | Japan |
| Gui aiueo:S - A stone from another mountain to polish your own | ギ・あいうえおス 他山の石を以って己の玉を磨くべし | Go Shibata | Japan |
| Harmonium | 淵に立つ | Koji Fukada | Japan |
| Sweet Bean | あん | Naomi Kawase | Japan |
| Touching the Skin of Eeriness | 不気味なものの肌に触れる | Ryusuke Hamaguchi | Japan |
| Tsukiji Wonderland | | Naotaro Endo | Japan |
| What a Wonderful Family! | 家族はつらいよ | Yoji Yamada | Japan |

=== (O)Zeeing the Neighbour ===
| English title | Original title | Director(s) | Production countrie(s) |
|---|---|---|---|
| The Dressmaker | | Jocelyn Moorhouse | Australia |
| Tanna | | Martin Butler, Bentley Dean | Australia, Vanuatu |
| The Water Diviner | | Russell Crowe | Australia, United States, Turkey |

=== Iranian Independents ===
| English title | Original title | Director(s) | Production countrie(s) |
|---|---|---|---|
| Immortality | جاودانگی | Mehdi Fard Ghaderi | Iran |
| Lantouri | لانتوری | Reza Dormishian | Iran |
| Risk of Acid Rain | احتمال باران اسیدی | Behtash Sanaeeha | Iran |

=== Focus on Djenar Maesa Ayu ===
- Mereka Bilang, Saya Monyet! (2008)
- Saia (2009)
- Nay (2015)
- hUsh (2016)

== Awards ==
The following awards were presented at the festival:

- Golden Hanoman Award: Solo, Solitude by Yosep Anggi Noen
- Silver Hanoman Award: The Island Funeral by Pimpaka Towira
- NETPAC Award: Leftovers by Wicaksono Wisnu Legowo
- Geber Award: Leftovers by Wicaksono Wisnu Legowo
- Blencong Award: Memoria by Kamila Andini
- Jogja Student Film Award: Memoria by Kamila Andini
