= Sara (2023 film) =

2023 drama film

- Poster
- Directed by: Ismail Basbeth
- Written by: Ismail Basbeth
- Produced by: Ismail Basbeth; Ridla An-Nuur; Charlie Meliala; Lyza Anggraheni; Jody Bany Wicaksono
- Starring: Asha Smara Darra; Christine Hakim; Mian Tiara; Jajang C. Noer; Landung Simatupang
- Cinematography: Budi Dwi Arifianto
- Edited by: Ismail Basbeth; Andhy Pulung
- Music by: Charlie Meliala
- Production companies: Bosan Berisik Lab; Ruang Basbeth; Visionari Capital
- Release date: 6 October 2023 (Busan)
- Running time: 99 minutes
- Country: Indonesia
- Language: Indonesian

Sara is a 2023 drama film directed and written by Ismail Basbeth. The film stars Asha Smara Darra in the titular role and Christine Hakim as her mother.

It had its world premiere at the 28th Busan International Film Festival on 6 October 2023. It received two nominations at the 2023 Indonesian Film Festival: Best Actress for Darra and Best Supporting Actress for Hakim.

== Premise ==
Sara, a trans woman, returns to her conservative hometown for her father's funeral. She discovers her mother Muryem, who has dementia, does not recognize her.

== Cast ==
- Asha Smara Darra as Sara
- Christine Hakim as Muryem, Sara's mother
- Mian Tiara as Ayu, Sara's childhood best friend
- Jajang C. Noer as Saidah, Ayu's mother
- Landung Simatupang as Said, an ustad also a best friend of Sara's father

== Production ==
Principal photography took place in a village in Central Java. In a press conference, Noer shared that the cast also settled together with the local villagers.

== Release ==
Sara had its world premiere at the 28th Busan International Film Festival on 6 October 2023 during the A Window on Asian Cinema and Special Program in Focus: Renaissance of Indonesian Cinema programs.

== Accolades ==
Sara was nominated for two categories at the 2023 Indonesian Film Festival. Darra became the first trans woman to be nominated for the Best Actress category.

Award / Film Festival	Date of ceremony	Category	Recipient(s)	Result	Ref.
Indonesian Film Festival	14 November 2023	Best Actress	Asha Smara Darra	Nominated	
Indonesian Film Festival	14 November 2023	Best Supporting Actress	Christine Hakim	Nominated	
Jogja-NETPAC Asian Film Festival	2 December 2023	JAFF Indonesian Screen Award – Best Directing	Ismail Basbeth	Won	
Film Pilihan Tempo	29 January 2024	Film Pilihan Tempo	Sara	Nominated	
Film Pilihan Tempo	29 January 2024	Best Director	Ismail Basbeth	Nominated	
Film Pilihan Tempo	29 January 2024	Best Screenplay	Ismail Basbeth	Nominated	
Film Pilihan Tempo	29 January 2024	Best Actress	Asha Smara Darra	Nominated	
Film Pilihan Tempo	29 January 2024	Best Supporting Actor	Landung Simatupang	Nominated	
Film Pilihan Tempo	29 January 2024	Best Supporting Actress	Christine Hakim	Won	
