= AFLC =

AFLC may refer to:

- Air Force Logistics Command
- American Football League of China
- Antiferroelectric liquid crystal
- Association of Free Lutheran Congregations
