= All We Need Is Time =

2024 drama film

- Poster
- Directed by: Teddy Soeriaatmadja
- Written by: Teddy Soeriaatmadja
- Produced by: Teddy Soeriaatmadja; Lukman Sardi
- Starring: Bima Azriel; Lukman Sardi; Sha Ine Febriyanti; Tissa Biani
- Cinematography: Vera Lestafa
- Edited by: W. Ichwandiardono
- Production companies: Adhya Pictures; Karuna Pictures; Kathanika Entertainment
- Release dates: 2 December 2024 (Jogja); 15 May 2025 (Indonesia)
- Running time: 95 minutes
- Country: Indonesia
- Language: Indonesian

All We Need Is Time (Indonesian: Mungkin Kita Perlu Waktu) is a 2024 drama film directed and written by Teddy Soeriaatmadja. The film stars Bima Azriel, Lukman Sardi, Sha Ine Febriyanti, and Tissa Biani.

It had its world premiere at the 19th Jogja-NETPAC Asian Film Festival on 2 December 2024. It was theatrically released in Indonesia on 15 May 2025.

== Premise ==
A high school student tries to recover from the trauma and guilt of losing his sister.

== Cast ==
- Bima Azriel as Ombak Kurniawan
- Lukman Sardi as Restu
- Sha Ine Febriyanti as Kasih
- Tissa Biani as Aleiqa
- Asri Welas as Nana
- Naura Hakim as Sara

== Production ==
In October 2024, the film was announced at the 2024 Jakarta Film Week Producers Network event during Adhya Pictures' slate presentation.

== Release ==
All We Need Is Time had its world premiere at the 19th Jogja-NETPAC Asian Film Festival on 2 December 2024, competing for the Indonesian Screen Awards. It was released in Indonesian theatres on 15 May 2025.

== Accolades ==
Award / Film Festival	Date of ceremony	Category	Recipient(s)	Result	Ref.
Jogja-NETPAC Asian Film Festival	7 December 2024	Indonesian Screen Award for Best Film	Teddy Soeriaatmadja	Nominated	
Film Pilihan Tempo	5 February 2025	Best Actress	Sha Ine Febriyanti	Nominated	
Film Pilihan Tempo	5 February 2025	Best Supporting Actor	Lukman Sardi	Nominated	
Festival Film Bandung	31 October 2025	Highly Commended Supporting Actor	Bima Azriel	Nominated	
Festival Film Bandung	31 October 2025	Highly Commended Screenplay	Teddy Soeria Atmadja	Nominated	
