= Yohanna (film) =

2024 drama film by Razka Robby Ertanto

- Film poster
- Directed by: Razka Robby Ertanto
- Written by: Razka Robby Ertanto
- Produced by: Razka Robby Ertanto; Denis Krupnov
- Starring: Laura Basuki
- Cinematography: Odyssey Flores
- Edited by: Diego Marx Dobles
- Music by: Christopher Barnett
- Production companies: REASON8; Summerland; Pilgrim Film
- Release date: 29 January 2024 (Rotterdam)
- Running time: 85 minutes
- Countries: Indonesia; United Kingdom; Italy
- Language: Indonesian

Yohanna is a 2024 international co-produced drama film written and directed by Razka Robby Ertanto. It stars Laura Basuki in the titular role.

It had world premiere at the 53rd International Film Festival Rotterdam on 29 January 2024, competing for the VPRO Big Screen Award.

== Premise ==
Yohanna, a young nun, gets drawn into the underworld of child labour in Sumba. It restores her faith and purpose of life.

== Cast ==
- Laura Basuki as Yohanna
- Kirana Putri Grasela as Alis
- Iqua Tahlequa as Malu
- Videlis Siprianus Diki as Victor
- Jajang C. Noer as head sister

== Production ==
The principal photography took place in Sumba, West Nusa Tenggara, Indonesia and wrapped in May 2022. Ertanto conceived the idea of Yohanna after being saddened to see child laborers in a visit to Sumba.

== Release ==
Yohanna had its world premiere at the 53rd International Film Festival Rotterdam on 29 January 2024 during the Big Screen section, competing for the VPRO Big Screen Award.

== Accolades ==
Award / Film Festival	Date of ceremony	Category	Recipient(s)	Result	Ref.
International Film Festival Rotterdam	4 February 2024	Big Screen Award	Razka Robby Ertanto	Nominated	
Jogja-NETPAC Asian Film Festival	7 December 2024	Indonesian Screen Award for Best Film	Razka Robby Ertanto	Won	
Jogja-NETPAC Asian Film Festival	7 December 2024	Indonesian Screen Award for Best Directing	Razka Robby Ertanto	Won	
Jogja-NETPAC Asian Film Festival	7 December 2024	Indonesian Screen Award for Best Storytelling	Razka Robby Ertanto	Won	
Jogja-NETPAC Asian Film Festival	7 December 2024	Indonesian Screen Award for Best Performance	Laura Basuki, Kirana Putri Grasela and Iqua Tahlequa	Won	
Jogja-NETPAC Asian Film Festival	7 December 2024	Indonesian Screen Award for Best Cinematography	Odyssey Flores	Won	
Film Pilihan Tempo	5 February 2025	Film Pilihan Tempo	Yohanna	Won	
Film Pilihan Tempo	5 February 2025	Best Director	Razka Robby Ertanto	Nominated	
Film Pilihan Tempo	5 February 2025	Best Screenplay	Razka Robby Ertanto	Nominated	
Film Pilihan Tempo	5 February 2025	Best Actress	Laura Basuki	Won	
