= Orpa (film) =

2022 drama film

- Theatrical release poster
- Directed by: Theo Rumansara
- Written by: Theo Rumansara
- Produced by: Axel Putra; Giovanni Rahmadeva; Cornelio Sunny; Dani Huda
- Starring: Orsilla Murib; Arnold Kobogau; Michael Kho; Otiana Murib
- Cinematography: Fahmy J. Saad
- Edited by: Helmi Nur Rasyid; Indra Sukmana
- Music by: Harsya Wahono; Rizky Argadipraja
- Production companies: QUN Films; Matta Cinema
- Release dates: 27 November 2022 (Yogyakarta); 7 September 2023 (Indonesia)
- Running time: 99 minutes
- Country: Indonesia
- Language: Indonesian

Orpa is a 2022 drama film directed and written by Theo Rumansara in his directorial debut. The film stars Orsilla Murib, Arnold Kobogau, Michael Kho, and Otiana Murib. It had its world premiere at the 17th Jogja-NETPAC Asian Film Festival on 27 November 2022. It received a nomination for Best Supporting Actor at the 2023 Indonesian Film Festival for Kobogau.

== Premise ==
Orpa is a 16-year-old girl who is about to have an arranged marriage to a rich man from Jayapura. She is then helped by Ryan, a musician from Jakarta, to escape to pursue her dream of attending school in Wamena.

== Cast ==
- Orsilla Murib as Orpa
- Arnold Kobogau as Septinus, Orpa's father
- Michael Kho as Ryan
- Otiana Murib as Ester

== Production ==
Film production company, QUN Films initiated a competition program, Jendela Papua (English: The Window of Papua), to accommodate the creativity of Papuans in filmmaking. Orpa was selected to be produced as a feature-length film.

Principal photography took place for ten days in mid 2021.

== Release ==
Orpa had its world premiere at the 17th Jogja-NETPAC Asian Film Festival on 27 November 2022, competing for the Indonesian Screen Awards. It was screened in Western New Guinea at the Mal Jayapura XXI in Jayapura on 17 December 2022. The film had its international premiere at the 2023 CinemAsia Film Festival in Amsterdam, Netherlands on 9 March 2023.

The film was released theatrically in Indonesia on 7 September 2023. It garnered 20,773 admissions during its theatrical run.

== Accolades ==
Award / Film Festival	Date of ceremony	Category	Recipient(s)	Result	Ref.
Jogja-NETPAC Asian Film Festival	3 December 2022	Indonesian Screen Award for Best Film	Theo Rumansara	Nominated	
Jogja-NETPAC Asian Film Festival	3 December 2022	Indonesian Screen Award for Best Performance	Orsilla Murib	Won (Note: Shared with Rafli Anwar Mursadad for his performance in Sound from the Sea.)	
Indonesian Film Festival	14 November 2023	Best Supporting Actor	Arnold Kobogau	Nominated	
