= Love for Sale (2018 film) =

2018 romantic drama film

- Theatrical release poster
- Directed by: Andibachtiar Yusuf
- Screenplay by: Andibachtiar Yusuf; M. Irfan Ramly
- Story by: Andibachtiar Yusuf; Adrian Martinus
- Produced by: Angga Dwimas Sasongko; Chicco Jerikho
- Starring: Gading Marten; Della Dartyan
- Cinematography: Ferry Rusli
- Edited by: Hendra Adhi Susanto
- Music by: McAnderson
- Production companies: Visinema Pictures; Stay Connected Media; 13 Entertainment
- Release date: 15 March 2018 (Indonesia)
- Running time: 104 minutes
- Country: Indonesia
- Language: Indonesian

Love for Sale is a 2018 romantic drama film directed by Andibachtiar Yusuf. It stars Gading Marten and Della Dartyan. It is the first performance in a leading role for both Marten and Dartyan.

The film was theatrically released in Indonesia on 15 March 2018. It received three nominations at the 2018 Indonesian Film Festival, winning one for Best Actor (Marten).

== Premise ==
A long-time bachelor falls in love with a woman he met on a dating app, unaware that the app includes a 45-day contract.

== Cast ==
- Gading Marten as Richard Achmad
- Della Dartyan as Arini Kusuma
- Adriano Qalbi as Jaka
- Melissa Karim as Retno Tanjung
- Torro Margens as Mr. Kartolo
- Albert Halim as Raka
- Rukman Rosadi as Syamsul
- Annisa Pagih as Keke

== Production ==
In August 2017, Visinema Pictures would produce the film, with Gading Marten and Della Dartyan attached to star, and Andibachtiar Yusuf to direct. The idea of the film was conceived eight years earlier, but it was realized after producer Angga Dwimas Sasongko became involved. Yusuf revealed that in the earlier drafts of the script, he had planned for Gading's father, Roy Marten, to star in the leading role, but this was later adjusted. Principal photography took place in August and September 2017 around Jakarta and Bogor, West Java.

== Release ==
Love for Sale was theatrically released in Indonesia on 15 March 2018. It garnered 156,744 admissions during its theatrical run.

== Sequel and spinoff ==
In May 2019, Visinema Pictures announced the sequel of the film, with Yusuf returned to direct. The sequel, Love for Sale 2, was theatrically released in Indonesia on 31 October 2019, starring Della Dartyan and Adipati Dolken. A spinoff film, Arini by Love.inc was released on 4 February 2022 on Bioskop Online.

== Accolades ==
Award / Film Festival	Date of ceremony	Category	Recipient(s)	Result	Ref.
Jogja-NETPAC Asian Film Festival	4 December 2018	Indonesian Screen Award for Best Film	Andibachtiar Yusuf	Nominated	
Jogja-NETPAC Asian Film Festival	4 December 2018	Indonesian Screen Award for Best Storytelling	Andibachtiar Yusuf and M. Irfan Ramly	Won	
Tempo Film Festival	6 December 2018	Film Pilihan Tempo	Love for Sale	Nominated	
Tempo Film Festival	6 December 2018	Best Director	Andibachtiar Yusuf	Nominated	
Tempo Film Festival	6 December 2018	Best Actor	Gading Marten	Won	
Tempo Film Festival	6 December 2018	Best Actress	Della Dartyan	Nominated	
Tempo Film Festival	6 December 2018	Best Screenplay	Andibachtiar Yusuf and M. Irfan Ramly	Nominated	
Indonesian Film Festival	9 December 2018	Best Actor	Gading Marten	Won	
Indonesian Film Festival	9 December 2018	Best Actress	Della Dartyan	Nominated	
Indonesian Film Festival	9 December 2018	Best Original Screenplay	Andibachtiar Yusuf and M. Irfan Ramly	Nominated	
Maya Awards	19 January 2019	Best Feature Film	Angga Dwimas Sasongko and Chicco Jerikho	Nominated	
Maya Awards	19 January 2019	Best Director	Andibachtiar Yusuf	Nominated	
Maya Awards	19 January 2019	Best Actor in a Leading Role	Gading Marten	Won	
Maya Awards	19 January 2019	Best Original Screenplay	Andibachtiar Yusuf and M. Irfan Ramly	Won	
Maya Awards	19 January 2019	Tuti Indra Malaon Award for Best Breakthrough Actress	Della Dartyan	Nominated	
Maya Awards	19 January 2019	Best Art Direction	Adam Fauzan Sudrajat and Kamerad Edmond	Nominated	
Maya Awards	19 January 2019	Best Editing	Hendra Adhi Susanto	Nominated	
Maya Awards	19 January 2019	Best Poster Design	Alvin Hariz	Won	
