= Asha Smara Darra =

Indonesian actress and fashion designer

Asha Smara Darra (born Oscar Septianus Lawalata, 1 September 1977) is an Indonesian fashion designer. She studied fashion at schools in Jakarta. She finished half of the 3-year term and then quit during the monetary crisis in 1998. She opened her own boutique along with her partner Novie.

In 2023, Darra made her lead acting debut, starring as the titular role drama film Sara. She got a nomination for Citra Award for Best Actress at the 2023 Indonesian Film Festival, becoming the first trans woman to do so.
