= Chinese National Football League =

Highest tier of American football in China

- Founded: 2013; 13 years ago
- Country: China
- Number of clubs: 56
- Current champions: Beijing Cyclones (2025)

The Chinese National Football League (CNFL), previously known as the American Football League of China (AFLC) is the highest level of American football in China. Founded in 2013, the AFLC has expanded rapidly and in 2019, the AFLC was officially renamed the CNFL.

== History ==
The AFLC was founded in 2013 by Chris McLaurin, a former football player for the University of Michigan. McLaurin, working in Chongqing at the time, helped to organize a group of locals and expatriates interested in football into the Chongqing Dockers, whose first season was profiled by The New Republic in "The Year of the Pigskin". After organizing the Dockers and building relationships with other new football clubs around the country, McLaurin organized a meeting of the original eight AFLC teams in Shanghai to form the league. The first AFLC season featured two divisions: the Beijing Cyclones, Shanghai Titans, Shanghai Warriors and Tianjin Pirates in the East; and the Chongqing Dockers, Chengdu Mustangs, Guangzhou Tigers and Hong Kong Warhawks in the West. Not all of the early teams were accepted into the league, such as the Suzhou Blue Knights, who continue to play non-conference games with league teams. The 2013 season culminated in the first AFLC Championship Game at Luwan Stadium in Shanghai on January 12, 2014, and saw the Dockers defeat the Warriors 24-16 to claim the first AFLC Championship.

The League grew with more teams joining each year except for 2015, when it shrank slightly to 10 teams from 12 in 2014. When McLaurin stepped down from the commissioner role, the AFLC named Datong Wang as his successor. McLaurin went on to consult various football organizations in China, including the NFL, Nike Sports Camps and Fosun Group.

In 2019, the league renamed itself to the CNFL and in 2024, consists of 56 teams, including teams from Hong Kong and Taiwan, divided into A and B groups depending on their level of competitiveness. Each Group is then split into 4 divisions (North, South, East, and West).

== CNFL Champions ==
Season	Champion
2013	Chongqing Dockers (24-16, over the Shanghai Warriors)
2014	Shanghai Nighthawks (26-24, over the Shanghai Titans)
2015	Shanghai Warriors (37-30, over the Shanghai Nighthawks)
2016	Shanghai Titans (28-6, over Shanghai Nighthawks)
2017	Shanghai Warriors (30-20, over Shanghai Titans)
2018	Shanghai Warriors (40-34, Overtime over Shanghai Titans)
2019	Wuhan Berserkers (36-13, over Shanghai Titans)
2020	Hangzhou Smilodons (33-24, over Chengdu Pandaman)
2021	Shanghai Titans (27-14, over Chengdu Pandaman)
2022	Shanghai Wolves (20-8, over Hangzhou Smilodons)
2023	Shanghai Wolves (34-9, over Hangzhou Smilodons)
2024	Shanghai Wolves (52-34, over Beijing Cyclones)
2025	Beijing Cyclones (51-42, over Shanghai Warriors)

== Media coverage ==
=== In Western markets ===
Major media outlets such as BBC World News, ESPN, and NPR have included the AFLC in their coverage, and extensive features on McLaurin and the AFLC have printed in Time, Global Times, The Atlantic, Esquire, The New Republic, Quartz and Asean Weekly.

=== In Chinese markets ===
The AFLC is frequently featured in local and national media around China, including extensive national coverage on Shanghai Media Group's International Channel Shanghai, CCTV 9, World Insight, QQ Sports, Sina Sports, and China Daily, as well as frequent pieces on local TV, radio, and print news in many of the AFLC's regional markets. The AFLC's strong local Chinese-language media profile owes in large part to the fundamental integration of Chinese players, managers, and league administrators into the AFLC structure. The story of the inaugural team, the Chongqing Dockers, was loosely adapted into a film in 2025, Clash, directed by Jiang Jiacheng (Looking for Lucky). The audience enjoyed its premiere at the 54th International Film Festival Rotterdam, where the film ranked 37 out of 188 total.

=== By the international football community ===
The AFLC has received extensive coverage by American Football International (AFI), a leading international review of American rules football play around the world. Articles are regularly written about the league by AFI staff, and scores and standings of AFLC games are accessible on their website. The AFLC has also been profiled by the Gridiron Leaders' Foundation, NFL China and NFL Hupu.
