= Ali Topan =

2023 drama film

- Theatrical release poster
- Directed by: Sidharta Tata
- Screenplay by: Ifan Ismail; Sidharta Tata
- Based on: Ali Topan Anak Jalanan by Teguh Esha
- Produced by: Tersi Eva Ranti
- Starring: Jefri Nichol; Lutesha; Omara Esteghlal; Reza Hilman; Bebeto Leutualy
- Cinematography: Ujel Bausad
- Edited by: Ahmad Fesdi Anggoro
- Music by: Abel Huray
- Production companies: Visinema Pictures; Kebon Studios
- Release dates: 7 October 2023 (Busan); 14 February 2024 (Indonesia)
- Running time: 115 minutes
- Country: Indonesia
- Language: Indonesian

Ali Topan is a 2023 road romantic drama film directed and written by Sidharta Tata, based on the 1977 novel Ali Topan Anak Jalanan by Teguh Esha. Presented by Visinema Pictures and produced by Kebon Studios, the film stars Jefri Nichol in the titular role, alongside Lutesha, Omara Esteghlal, Reza Hilman, and Bebeto Leutualy.

The film had its world premiere at the 28th Busan International Film Festival on 7 October 2023. It was released theatrically in Indonesia on 14 February 2024.

== Premise ==
Ali Topan and Anna Karenina fall in love with each other, but their relationship is strongly opposed by Anna's parents. Then, Ali and Anna decides to go on an adventure together through the cross-city roads of Java as an act of rebellion.

== Cast ==
- Jefri Nichol as Ali Topan
- Lutesha as Anna Karenina
- Reza Hilman as Dudung
- Omara Esteghlal as Bobby
- Bebeto Leutualy as Gevaert

== Production ==
In February 2023, it was announced that Visinema Pictures had optioned the 1977 novel Ali Topan Anak Jalanan which was adapted into a feature film of the same name in the same year. It was announced alongside the cast, with Jefri Nichol and Lutesha attached to star as the main characters, Ali Topan and Anna Karenina. Principal photography took place in March 2023 in Jakarta, around Central Java, and Yogyakarta. Legacy Pictures financed the film.

== Release ==
Ali Topan had its world premiere at the 28th Busan International Film Festival on 7 October 2023, during A Window On Asian Cinema section. It was also screened at the 18th Jogja-NETPAC Asian Film Festival, competing for the Indonesian Screen Awards. The film was released theatrically in Indonesia on 14 February 2024. It garnered 59,474 admissions during its theatrical run. SCTV acquired the film's broadcasting rights, premiering it on 24 August 2025.
