= 19th Jogja-NETPAC Asian Film Festival =

2024 film festival

- Opening film: Samsara by Garin Nugroho
- Closing film: A Brother and 7 Siblings by Yandy Laurens
- Location: Yogyakarta, Indonesia
- Founded: 2006
- No. of films: 180
- Festival date: 30 November–7 December 2024
- Website: jaff-filmfest.org

Jogja-NETPAC Asian Film Festival
- 20th 18th

The 19th annual Jogja-NETPAC Asian Film Festival was held from 30 November to 7 December 2024 in Yogyakarta, Indonesia. A total of 180 films from 25 Asia–Pacific countries were screened during the festival. The festival opened with Garin Nugroho's silent film Samsara and closed with the world premiere of Yandy Laurens' A Brother and 7 Siblings. This year marks the inaugural edition of JAFF Market, an initiative aimed at reshaping the Indonesian film industry by fostering networking and collaboration among various sectors.

The festival's most prestigious award, Golden Hanoman Award, was presented to drama film Happyend.

== Official selections ==
=== Opening and closing films ===
English title	Original title	Director(s)	Production countrie(s)
Samsara (opening film)		Garin Nugroho	Indonesia
A Brother and 7 Siblings (closing film)	1 Kakak 7 Ponakan	Yandy Laurens	Indonesia

=== In competition ===
English title	Original title	Director(s)	Production countrie(s)
Ben and Suzanne, A Reunion in 4 Parts		Shaun Seneviratne	United States, Sri Lanka
Breaking the Cycle	อำนาจ ศรัทธา อนาคต	Aekaphong Saransate, Thanakrit Duangmaneeporn	Thailand, Singapore, United States
Crocodile Tears	Air Mata Buaya	Tumpal Tampubolon	Indonesia, France, Singapore, Germany
Don't Cry, Butterfly	Mưa trên cánh bướm	Linh Duong	Vietnam, Singapore, Philippines, Indonesia
Happyend		Neo Sora	Japan, United States
In the Belly of a Tiger		Jatla Siddartha	India, United States, China, Indonesia, Taiwan
In the Land of Brothers	در سرزمین برادر	Raha Amirfazli, Alireza Ghasemi	Iran, France, Netherlands
MA - Cry of Silence	မ	The Maw Naing	Myanmar, South Korea, Singapore, France, Norway, Qatar
Tale of the Land		Loeloe Hendra	Indonesia, Philippines, Qatar, Taiwan
Three Sons of Narayani	Narayaneente Moonnaanmakkal	Sharan Venugopal	India
Việt and Nam	Trong lòng đất	Minh Quý Trương	Vietnam, Philippines, Singapore, France, Netherlands, Italy, United States, Germany
Yukiko a.k.a	雪子 a.k.a.	Naoya Kusaba	Japan

=== Panorama ===
English title	Original title	Director(s)	Production countrie(s)
All We Imagine as Light		Payal Kapadia	France, India, Netherlands, Luxembourg, Italy
An Unfinished Film	一部未完成的电影	Lou Ye	Singapore, Germany
Arzé		Mira Shaib	Lebanon, Egypt, Saudi Arabia
Black Box Diaries		Shiori Itō	Japan
Black Dog	狗阵	Guan Hu	China
Blue Sun Palace		Constance Tsang	United States
Cloud	クラウド	Kiyoshi Kurosawa	Japan
Ghost Cat Anzu	化け猫あんずちゃん	Yōko Kuno, Nobuhiro Yamashita	Japan, France
Girls Will Be Girls		Shuchi Talati	India, France
My Favourite Cake	کیک محبوب من	Maryam Moghaddam, Behtash Sanaeeha	Iran, France, Sweden, Germany
No Other Land	لا أرض أخرى	Basel Adra, Hamdan Ballal, Yuval Abraham, Rachel Szor	Palestine, Norway
The Paradise of Thorns	วิมานหนาม	Naruebet Kuno	Thailand
RM: Right People, Wrong Place	알엠: 라이트 피플, 롱 플레이스	Lee Seok-jun	South Korea
The Seed of the Sacred Fig	دانه‌ی انجیر معابد	Mohammad Rasoulof	Iran, Germany, France
Stranger Eyes	默視錄	Yeo Siew Hua	Singapore, Taiwan, France, United States
Universal Language	Une langue universelle	Matthew Rankin	Canada

=== Asian Perspectives ===
English title	Original title	Director(s)	Production countrie(s)
404 Run Run	404 สุขีนิรันดร์..Run Run	Pichaya Jarusboonpracha	Thailand
A Match	स्थळ	Jayant Digambar Somalkar	India
All, or Nothing At All	所有忧伤的年轻人	Jiajun "Oscar" Zhang	China
Happy Greetings	Salam Gembira	Dzul Sungit	Singapore
House of the Seasons	장손	Oh Jung-min	South Korea
I Want to Swim In the City	Tôi Muốn Bơi Trong Thành Phố	Trần Chí Cường	Vietnam
Love and Videotapes	Huling Palabas	Ryan Machado	Philippines
Paradise at Mother's Feet	Бейиш Эненин Таманында	Ruslan Akun	Kyrgyzstan
Plastic		Daisuke Miyazaki	Japan
Roxana		Parviz Shahbazi	Iran
Salome		Teng Mangansakan	Philippines
Snowdrop	スノードロップ	Kōta Yoshida	Japan
Some Nights I Feel Like Walking		Petersen Vargas	Philippines, Singapore, Italy
Sunday Special	Naale Rajaa Koli Majaa	Abhilash Shetty	India
That Summer's Lie	그 여름날의 거짓말	Sohn Hyun-lok	South Korea
Undertaker	Sapparor	Thiti Srinuan	Thailand

=== Rewind ===
English title	Original title	Director(s)	Production companie(s)
The Handmaiden (2016)	아가씨	Park Chan-wook	South Korea
Ilo Ilo (2013)	爸妈不在家	Anthony Chen	Singapore, France

=== Indonesian Screen Awards ===
English title	Original title	Director(s)
All We Need Is Time	Mungkin Kita Perlu Waktu	Teddy Soeriaatmadja
Goodbye, Farewell	Sampai Jumpa, Selamat Tinggal	Adriyanto Dewo
Love Unlike in K-Dramas	Cinta Tak Seindah Drama Korea	Meira Anastasia
Malam Pertobatan		Dyan Sunu Prastowo
The Queen of Witchcraft	Perempuan Pembawa Sial	Fajar Nugros
Yohanna		Razka Robby Ertanto

=== Special Screening ===
English title	Original title	Director(s)	Production country(s)
The East (2020)	De Oost	Jim Taihuttu	Netherlands, Belgium, Indonesia, France, United States
Little Rebels Cinema Club (2024)		Khozy Rizal	Indonesia

== Awards ==
The following awards were presented during the festival:

- Golden Hanoman Award: Happyend by Neo Sora
- Silver Hanoman Award: Việt and Nam by Minh Quý Trương
- NETPAC Award: MA - Cry of Silence by The Maw Naing
- JAFF Indonesian Screen Awards
  - Best Film: Yohanna by Razka Robby Ertanto
  - Best Directing: Razka Robby Ertanto for Yohanna
  - Best Storytelling: Razka Robby Ertanto for Yohanna
  - Best Performance: Laura Basuki, Kirana Putri Grasela, and Iqua Tahlequa for Yohanna
  - Best Cinematography: Odyssey Flores for Yohanna
  - Best Editing: Akhmad Fesdi Anggoro for The Queen of Witchcraft
- Blencong Award: When the Wind Rises by Hung Chen
- Geber Award: MA - Cry of Silence by The Maw Naing
- Student Award: When the Wind Rises by Hung Chen
