= Sha Ine Febriyanti =

Indonesian actress and film director

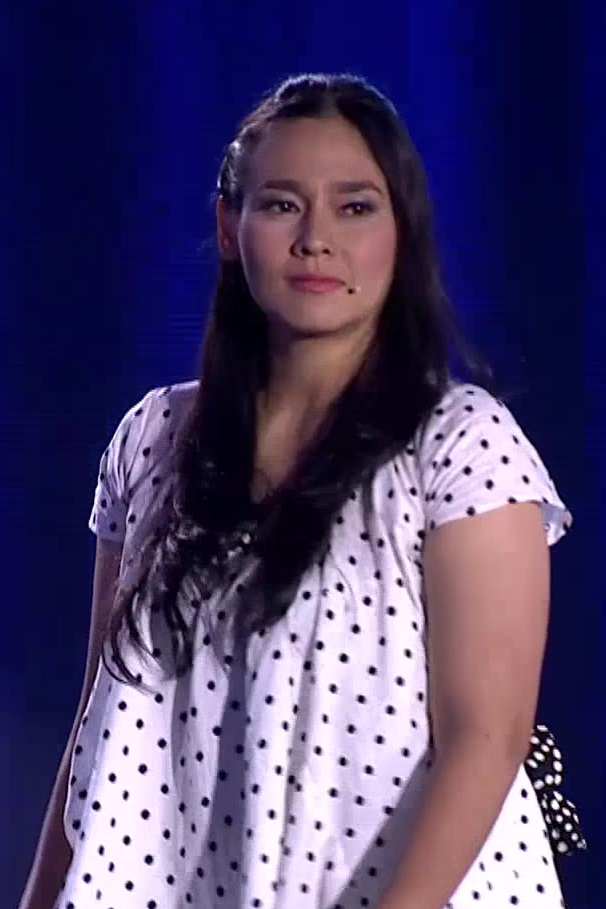
- Born: Sha Ine Febriyanti; February 18, 1976 (age 50); Semarang, Central Java, Indonesia
- Occupations: Actress; Film director
- Years active: 1992—now
- Spouse: Yudi Datau (m. 2003)
- Children: 3, including Aisha Nurra Datau
- Relatives: Mutia Datau (sister-in-law); Nunu Datau (sister-in-law); Iis Sugiarti (cousin); Yuni Shara (cousin); Krisdayanti (cousin); Aurel Hermansyah (niece)

Sha Ine Febriyanti (born 18 February 1976) is an actress and film director from Indonesia.

== Career ==
Ine started her modeling career after winning 2nd place in Cover Girl for Fashion Magazine in 1992. She then entered the world of acting by starring in the soap opera Darah Biru. She was invited to play in the television series Siluet under the direction of Aria Kusumadewa. Ine is also a Humanitarian Ambassador with Raslina Rasidin.

== Personal life ==
Ine married Yudi Datau, a cinematographer, in 2003. The marriage contract was held at the Al Musyawarah Mosque, Jalan Boulevard Raya, Kelapa Gading, North Jakarta. From this marriage, they have three children: Aisha Nurra Datau, who was born on 31 July 2004, Zeyn Arsa Datau, who was born on 20 October 2005 and Amanina Aliyya Sahata Datau, who was born on 14 June 2008. In 2017, Aisha followed her mother's path to becoming an actress by playing the main character in the film Iqro: Petualangan Meraih Bintang.

== Filmography ==
=== Short film ===
==== As an actress ====
Year	Title	Role	Notes
2002	Beth (Indonesian film)	Beth	
2007	Laksamana Keumalahayati	Laksamana Keumalahayati	
2015	Nay (Indonesian film)	Nayla Kinara	Single cast
2016	I am Hope	Sadina	
2019	This Earth of Mankind	Nyai Ontosoroh	
2019	If This Is My Story	Dee	
2022	Tegar	Wida	
2023	Andragogy	Prani Siswoyo	
2024	All We Need Is Time	Kasih	
TBA	Beautiful Pain		

Notes
Not released yet

==== As a film director ====
Year	Title	Role	Notes
2012	Kita Versus Korupsi	Director	Segment "Good Afternoon, Risa!"
2012	Kita Versus Korupsi	Screenwriter	Segment "Good Afternoon, Risa!"
2012	'Tuhan' Pada Jam 10 Malam	Director	
2012	'Tuhan' Pada Jam 10 Malam	Screenwriter	
2022	Tegar	Acting coach	

=== Film ===
==== As an actor ====
Year	Title	Role	Notes
2004	Dajang Soembi, Perempoean jang Dikawini Andjing	Dajang Soembi	
2013	Angin	Ida	

==== As film director ====
Year	Title	Role	Notes
2001	Cinderella	Director	
2007	Rumah Katulistiwa	Director	

=== Web series ===
Year	Title	Role	Notes
2023	Gadis Kretek	Roemaisa	

=== TV Series ===
Year	Title	Role	Notes
1995	Darah Biru		Debut
1996	Siluet		
1997	Dewi Selebriti	Dewi	
2000	Sampek Engtay	Engtay	

=== Theater ===
==== As an actress ====
Year	Title	Role	Note
1999, 2012	Miss Julie		
2000	Opera Primadona		
2001	Lamalera: The Whalers of South Sea		
2003	Ekstrimis		
2010	Surti dan Tiga Sawunggaling		
2012	Gandamayu		
2013	Warm		
2013	Padusi		
2014	Heat and Drop		
2014	Wakil Rakyat yang Terhormat		
2014	3 Perempuan		
2019	Panembahan Reso		

==== As a film director ====
Year	Title	Role	Notes
2014	Tjut Nyak Dhien	Director	
2018	Tjut Nyak Dhien	Director	

=== Television film ===
- Marinka (2000)

== Awards and nominations ==
Year	Role	Nominated categories	Nominated works	Result
2016	Indonesian Movie Actors Awards	Best Actress	Nay	Won
2016	Indonesian Movie Actors Awards	Favorite Actress	Nay	Nominated
2016	Bandung Film Festival	Best Actress	Nay	Won
2016	2016 Indonesian Film Festival	Best Actress	Nay	Nominated
2016	Maya Awards	Best Actress	Nay	Nominated
2019	Festival Film Indonesia	Best Actress	Bumi Manusia	Nominated
2019	Tempo Film Festival	Featured Lead Actress	Bumi Manusia	Nominated
2020	Maya Awards	Featured Lead Actress	Bumi Manusia	Nominated
2020	2020 Indonesian Movie Actors Awards	Best Actress	Bumi Manusia	Nominated
2020	2020 Indonesian Movie Actors Awards	Favorite Actress	Bumi Manusia	Nominated
2020	Bandung Film Festival	Best Supporting Actress	Bumi Manusia	Nominated
2023	Festival Film Indonesia	Best Actress	Budi Pekerti	Won
