= The Draft! =

2023 science fiction horror film

- Official poster
- Directed by: Yusron Fuadi
- Written by: Anindita Suryarasmi; Yusron Fuadi
- Produced by: Munandar Aji Wibowo; Fani Pramuditya
- Starring: Adhin Abdul Hakim; Anastasya Herzigova; Anggi Waluyo; Haydar Salishz; Winner Wijaya; Ibrahim Alhami
- Cinematography: Mandella Madjid
- Edited by: Ridwan Adi Bintara; Yusron Fuadi
- Music by: Clemens Felix Setyawan; I Ketut Sumerjana; Pandan Purwachandra
- Production company: Akasacara Film
- Distributed by: Blue Finch Films; Shudder
- Release dates: 27 November 2023 (JAFF); 5 March 2026 (Indonesia)
- Running time: 84 minutes
- Country: Indonesia
- Language: Indonesian

The Draft! (Indonesian: Setan Alas!) is a 2023 Indonesian science fiction horror film directed and written by Yusron Fuadi. The film stars Adhin Abdul Hakim, Anastasya Herzigova, Anggi Waluyo, Haydar Salishz, Winner Wijaya, and Ibrahim Alhami.

It had its world premiere at the 18th Jogja-NETPAC Asian Film Festival, where it won the Indonesian Screen Awards for Best Film and two other awards. It was theatrically released in Indonesia on 5 March 2026.

== Premise ==
Five average college students spend their weekend in an old villa, where they must solve the mystery of their friend's death.

== Cast ==
- Adhin Abdul Hakim as Iwan
- Anastasya Herzigova as Wati
- Anggi Waluyo as Ani
- Haydar Salishz as Budi Murah
- Winner Wijaya as Amir
- Ibrahim Alhami as Budi Mahal
- Ernanto Kusumo as Mang Dadang
- Hanung Bramantyo

== Production ==
More than 200 vocational high school students, college students, and lecturers across Indonesia were involved in the film's production. The principal photography took place in a villa in Kaliurang, Special Region of Yogyakarta.

== Release ==
The Draft! had its world premiere at the 18th Jogja-NETPAC Asian Film Festival on 27 November 2023 during the Indonesian Screen Awards. It won the Indonesian Screen Awards for Best Film, along with Best Editing and Best Storytelling. The film had its international premiere at the 2024 Fantastic Fest. Prior to its international premiere, Blue Finch Films acquired its worldwide rights.

It was theatrically released on 5 March 2026 in Indonesia.

== Critical reception ==
On the review aggregator website Rotten Tomatoes, 82% of 17 critics' reviews are positive.
