= Lanka Bandaranayake =

Sri Lankan filmmaker and actor

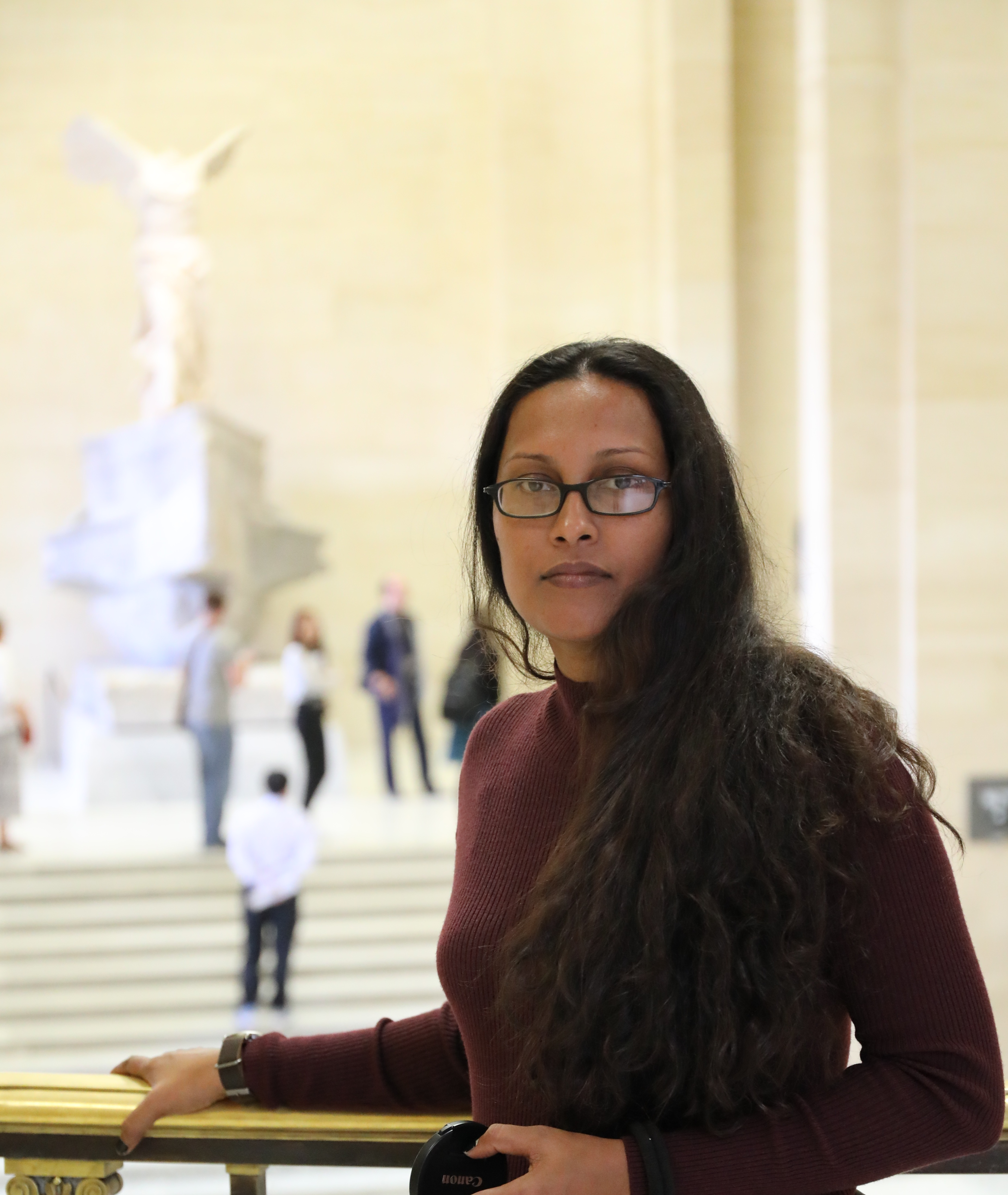
- Born: 21 May 1982 (age 44); Anuradhapura, Sri Lanka
- Occupations: Film Director; Producer; Actor
- Years active: 1998–present
- Notable work: Tradition (2016)

Lanka Bandaranayake is a Sri Lankan filmmaker, producer, screenwriter, actor, and theatre artist who mainly works in Sri Lankan cinema. She is known for the short film Tradition (2016).

== Early life ==
Lanka was born in Anuradhapura, Sri Lanka. In 2016, she finished her Bachelor of Arts degree in the University of Kelaniya, Sri Lanka. She received a Chevening Scholarship in 2021 for her Master's Degree in Directing Film and Television, which she completed with Distinction at Bournemouth University in the United Kingdom.

== Career ==
Lanka started her career as a theatre artist in 1998 before filmmaking in 2016. She has been working as an actress and costume designer in theatre, teledramas, and films.

In 2008, she was cast in Security, a short theatre play that was directed by Hewage Bandula. It was staged at the Colombo Theatre Fest for Young Audiences, 2008.

Her first short film, Tradition, was selected for more than 40 international film festivals.

In 2019, she directed her second short film, Inheritance (2020), with the partnership of the British Council of Sri Lanka.

In 2020, Lanka directed "The Delivery" chapter on the anthology film Goodnight Colombo.

Her third short film, Mahasona (2021), was selected for various film festivals.

In 2021, her debut feature film, The Hail, was selected by the Film Independent’s Fiscal Sponsorship program at Global Media Makers in Los Angeles. During the program, she developed her debut feature film project, The Hail (Working Title).

== Filmography ==
Year	Title	Director	Writer	Producer	Notes	Ref.
2016	Tradition	Yes	Yes	Yes		
2020	Inheritance	Yes	Yes	Co-producer	Nominated for National Short Film at 6TH JAFFNA ICF	
2021	Mahasona	Yes	Yes	Co-writer		
2021	The Delivery	Yes	Yes	No	Short film from an anthology	

== Awards and recognition ==
- Punchi Janelaya - Jury Special Awards (Production) at National Youth Award Festival 2009.
- Tradition - Best Cinematography at Euro Kino Czech IIFF 2017, Czech Republic.
- Tradition - Best Short Film at 12th Jogja-NETPAC Asian Film Festival 2017, Indonesia;
- Tradition - Special Jury Recognition at 9th SAARC Film Festival 2019, Sri Lanka.
- Inheritance - Special Jury Award at the Colombo International Women's Film Festival 2020, Sri Lanka.
- Chevening Alumni of the Year 2024.
- International Alumni Award Winner 2024 from Bournemouth University in the UK.
- Winner of the Culture and Creativity category at the Study UK Alumni Awards Sri Lanka 2024.
