= MA - Cry of Silence =

- Directed by: The Maw Naing
- Written by: Young Jeong Oh
- Produced by: Young Jeong Oh; The Maw Naing
- Starring: Su Lay
- Cinematography: Tin Win Naing
- Edited by: Nicolas Bancilhon; VFX: Arthur Pedel
- Music by: Mathieu Farnarier (Supervising sound editor & Sound design)
- Production companies: One Point Zero; Plus Point One
- Release date: 4 October 2024; (South Korea)
- Running time: 74 minutes
- Countries: Myanmar; South Korea; Singapore; France; Norway; Qatar
- Language: Burmese

MA - Cry of Silence (Burmese: မ) is a 2024 Burmese film written by Young Jeong Oh and directed by The Maw Naing. It is produced by The Maw Naing and Young Jeong Oh under the production studios One Point Zero and Plus Point One. It is inspired by women's strikes that took place in 2012 in Myanmar.

MA - Cry of Silence was premiered at various film festivals, which include 29th Busan International Film Festival 2024, Hong Kong Asian Film Festival 2024, Taipei Golden Horse Film Festival 2024 (Windows on Asia), World Film Festival of Bangkok 2024, Dharamshala International Film Festival 2024, 19th Jogja-NETPAC Asian Film Festival 2024, Festival International du Film de Marrakech 2024, 2nd Eikhoigi Imphal International Film Festival 2025 and Göteborg Film Festival 2025.

== Cast ==
- Su Lay as Mi-Thet
- Kyawt Kay Khiang as Nyein-Nyein
- Ko Nanda as Ko-Tun
- Nwe Nwe Soe as Ei-Lay
- Nay Htoo Aung
- Thidar
- Htet Htet
- Khine Tha Zin Ko

== Production ==
The film is co-produced by Jeremy Chua (Potocol), Charlotte Guénin (Massala), Marie Fuglestein Lægreid, Ingrid Lill Høgtun, Linda Bolstad Strønen (DUOfilm) and Jean-Baptiste Bailly-Maitre (Alpha Violet Production).

== Release ==
MA - Cry of Silence was screened on 4 October 2024 at the 29th Busan International Film Festival. The film was premiered at the Dharamshala International Film Festival on 9 November 2024. It had its European Premiere at the Göteborg Film Festival on 31 January, 1 & 2 February 2025.

== Reception ==
The film was reviewed by Allan Hunter of Screen Daily, Clarence Tsui of The Film Verdict, Namrata Joshi of Cinema Express, and Panos Kotzathanasis of Asian Movie Pulse.

== Accolades ==
Festival	Award	Result	Ref.
exground 38 International Film Festival 2025	Jury Prix - Amnesty International Film Awards Wiesbaden	Won	
Bishkek International Film Festival 2025	Grand Prix (Best film)	Won	
2nd Maia International Film Festival 2025	Gold Ear of Wheat – 1st Place	Won	
22nd Asian Film Festival 2025	Most Original Films	Won	
2nd Eikhoigi Imphal International Film Festival 2025	Best Fiction: International Competition	Won	
World Film Festival of Bangkok 2024	Special Mention	Won	
World Film Festival of Bangkok 2024	Best Film: Lotus Award Competition	Nominated	
29th Busan International Film Festival 2024	Best Film	Won	
19th Jogja-NETPAC Asian Film Festival 2024	Geber Award	Won	
19th Jogja-NETPAC Asian Film Festival 2024	NETPAC Award	Won	
19th Jogja-NETPAC Asian Film Festival 2024	Golden Hanoman Award	Nominated	
Hong Kong Asian Film Festival 2024	New Talent Award	Nominated	
61st Golden Horse Awards	NETPAC Award	Nominated	
Festival international du film de Marrakech 2024	Best Feature Film: Golden Star	Nominated	
Göteborg Film Festival 2025	International Competition: Dragon Award	Nominated	
Vesoul International Film Festival of Asian Cinema 2025	Best Feature Film: Golden Wheel	Nominated	
African, Asian and Latin American Film Festival 2025	Windows on the World Feature Film Competition	Nominated	
