= Ben and Suzanne, A Reunion in 4 Parts =

- Directed by: Shaun Seneviratne
- Written by: Shaun Seneviratne
- Produced by: Shaun Seneviratne; Doron Jepaul Mitchell
- Starring: Sathya Sridharan; Anastasia Olowin
- Cinematography: Molly Scotti
- Release date: March 11, 2024 (SXSW)
- Running time: 109 minutes
- Country: United States
- Languages: English; Tamil; Sinhala

Ben and Suzanne, A Reunion in 4 Parts is a 2024 American romantic comedy drama film written and directed by Shaun Seneviratne and starring Sathya Sridharan and Anastasia Olowin.

== Cast ==
- Sathya Sridharan as Ben Santhanaraj
- Anastasia Olowin as Suzanne Hopper

== Production ==
The film was shot in Sri Lanka.

== Release ==
The film premiered at South by Southwest on March 11, 2024. It will also be released at the Bentonville Film Festival in June 2024.

== Reception ==
The film has a 100% rating on Rotten Tomatoes based on five reviews. Benjamin Franz of Film Threat rated the film an 8 out of 10. Zoe Dumas of MovieWeb rated the film a 4 out of 5.

Naina Srivastava of The Austin Chronicle gave the film a positive review and wrote, "Seneviratne’s rom-com is a funny yet heartfelt look into a complicated relationship, in all its ups and downs, from heated disagreements to playful moments exploring scenic Sri Lanka."

Namrata Joshi of Cinema Express also gave the film a positive review and wrote, "For a film pivoted on dialogue, my takeaway has been a phrase. Pent-up anger we all know. I am going to use an expression whose copyright rests in the film with Ben and Ben alone: pent-up tenderness."
