= 18th Jogja-NETPAC Asian Film Festival =

2023 film festival

- Opening film: Autobio-Pamphlet by Ashish Avinash Bende
- Closing film: 13 Bombs in Jakarta by Angga Dwimas Sasongko
- Location: Yogyakarta, Indonesia
- Founded: 2006
- No. of films: 205
- Festival date: 25 November–2 December 2023
- Website: jaff-filmfest.org

Jogja-NETPAC Asian Film Festival
- 19th 17th

The 18th annual Jogja-NETPAC Asian Film Festival was held on 25 November to 2 December 2023 in Yogyakarta, Indonesia. The films were screened at the Empire XXI theatres and online through streaming service KlikFilm, meanwhile other fringe events were held at the LPP Yogyakarta.

A total of 205 films from 25 Asia–Pacific countries were screened during the festival. The festival opened with Ashish Avinash Bende's directorial debut film, Autobio-Pamphlet and closed with the world premiere of Angga Dwimas Sasongko's 13 Bombs in Jakarta. The festival was preceded by the screening of Wong Kar-wai films in three cities in November.

The most prestigious award, Golden Hanoman Award, was presented to experimental film Monisme, directed by Riar Rizaldi.

== Official selections ==
=== Opening and closing films ===
English title	Original title	Director(s)	Production country
Autobio-Pamphlet (opening film)	Aatmapamphlet	Ashish Avinash Bende	India
13 Bombs in Jakarta (closing film)	13 Bom di Jakarta	Angga Dwimas Sasongko	Indonesia

=== In competition ===
English title	Original title	Director(s)	Production country
Abang Adik		Jin Ong	Malaysia
Dreaming & Dying		Nelson Yeo	Singapore, Indonesia
Growing Apart	何处生长	Long Lingyun	China
Inside the Yellow Cocoon Shell	Bên trong vỏ kén vàng	Pham Thien An	Vietnam, Singapore, France, Spain
Last Shadow at First Light		Nicole Midori Woodford	Singapore, Japan, Slovenia, Philippines, Indonesia
Monisme		Riar Rizaldi	Indonesia, Qatar
Oasis of Now		Chia Chee Sum	Malaysia, France, Singapore
Tiger Stripes		Amanda Nell Eu	Malaysia, Indonesia, Taiwan, Singapore, France, Germany, Netherlands, Qatar
Which Colour?	Kayo Kayo Colour?	Shahrukhkhan Chavada	India

=== Indonesian Screen Awards ===
English title	Original title	Director(s)
Ali Topan		Sidharta Tata
The Draft!	Setan Alas!	Yusron Fuadi
Falling In Love Like In Movies	Jatuh Cinta Seperti Di Film-Film	Yandy Laurens
Monster		Rako Prijanto
The Prize	Onde Mande!	Paul Fauzan Agusta
Sara		Ismail Basbeth
Sleep Call		Fajar Nugros
Women from Rote Island	Perempuan Berkelamin Darah	Jeremias Nyangoen

=== Asian Perspectives ===
English title	Original title	Director(s)	Production country
#LookAtMe		Ken Kwek	Singapore
And Miles to Go Before I Sleep	九槍	Tsai Tsung-lung	Taiwan
Home Ground	홈그라운드	Kwon Aram	South Korea
I Love You, Beksman	Mahal Kita, Beksman	Percival Intalan	Philippines
La Luna		M. Raihan Halim	Singapore, Malaysia
Maryam		Badrul Hisham Ismail	Malaysia
Old Fashion, New Life	女德	Lam Can-zhao	Malaysia
Opium		Aman Sachdeva	India
Pendatang		Ken-Kin Ng	Malaysia
Qash	ҚАШ	Aisultan Seitov	Kazakhstan
River	リバー、流れないでよ	Junta Yamaguchi	Japan
Sugarland	Gitling	Jopy Arnaldo	Philippines
Waiting for the Light to Change		Linh Tran	United States

=== Panorama ===
English title	Original title	Director(s)	Production country
24 Hours with Gaspar	24 Jam Bersama Gaspar	Yosep Anggi Noen	Indonesia
All Ears	不虚此行	Jiayin Liu	China
Evil Does Not Exist	悪は存在しない	Ryusuke Hamaguchi	Japan
Fremont		Babak Jalali	United States
The Monk and the Gun		Pawo Choyning Dorji	Bhutan, France, United States, Taiwan
Monster	怪物	Hirokazu Kore-eda	Japan
Perfect Days		Wim Wenders	Japan, Germany
Ryuichi Sakamoto: Opus		Neo Sora	Japan
The Shadowless Tower	白塔之光	Zhang Lü	China
Shayda		Noora Niasari	Australia, Iran
Sweet Dreams		Ena Sendijarević	Netherlands, Belgium, Bosnia and Herzegovina, Indonesia, Sweden
Terrestrial Verses	آیه های زمینی	Ali Asgari, Alireza Khatami	Iran

=== Classics ===
English title	Original title	Director(s)	Production country
Paprika (2006)	パプリカ	Satoshi Kon	Japan
Perfect Blue (1997)	パーフェクトブルー	Satoshi Kon	Japan
The Raid (2011)	Serbuan Maut	Gareth Evans	Indonesia, France, United States

=== Nocturnal ===
English title	Original title	Director(s)	Production country
In Flames		Zarrar Kahn	Canada, Pakistan
In My Mother's Skin		Kenneth Dagalan	Philippines, Singapore, Taiwan
The Way of the Dragon (1972)	猛龍過江	Bruce Lee	Hong Kong

== Awards ==
The following awards were presented during the festival:

- Golden Hanoman Award

Monisme by Riar Rizaldi

- Silver Hanoman Award

Oasis of Now by Chia Chee Sum

- Special Mention in Main Competition

Dreaming & Dying by Nelson Yeo

- NETPAC Award

Which Colour? by Shahrukhkhan Chavada

- JAFF Indonesian Screen Awards

Best Film: The Draft! by Yusron Fuadi
Best Director: Ismail Basbeth – Sara
Best Storytelling: Anindita Suryarasmi and Yusron Fuadi – The Draft!
Best Performance: Irma Rihi – Women from Rote Island
Best Cinematography: Joseph Christoforus Fofid – Women from Rote Island
Best Editing: Ridwan A.B. and Yusron Fuadi – The Draft!

- Blencong Award

Hito by Stephen Lopez

- Geber Award

Abang Adik by Jin Ong

- Student Award

The River That Never Ends by J.T. Trinidad
