= Kirsten Tan =

Singaporean director

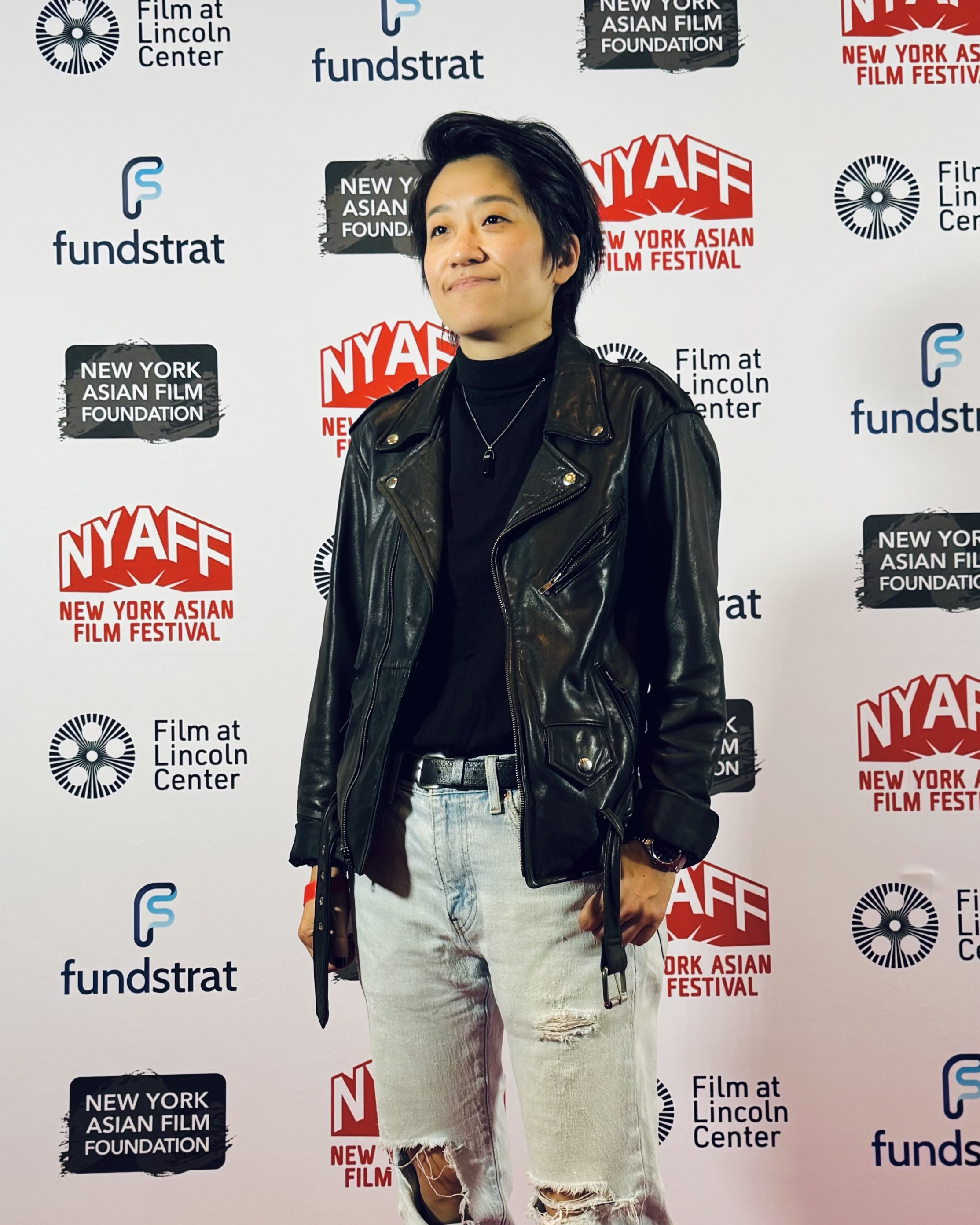
- Tan at Film at Lincoln Center 2025
- Born: Singapore
- Education: New York University
- Occupations: Director; Screenwriter
- Years active: 2005—present
- Notable work: Pop Aye

Chinese name
- Traditional Chinese: 陳敬音
- Simplified Chinese: 陈敬音
- Hanyu Pinyin: Chén Jìngyīn

Kirsten Tan（simplified Chinese: 陈敬音; traditional Chinese: 陳敬音; pinyin: chén jìngyīn）is a Singaporean film director and screenwriter. She is best known for her 2017 feature film debut, Pop Aye, which won the Special Jury Prize at the Sundance Film Festival, and was Singapore's official submission to the Academy Award for Best Foreign Language Film.

== Early life and education ==
Tan was born in Singapore to Chinese-educated business parents who wanted her to study science or economics. As a bilingual child, Tan read Charles Dickens and wuxia (swordfighting) novels by Jin Yong. Of this period she has said: “Reading was my first escape, an immediate access to a larger world.”

As a teenager at Dunman High and Victoria Junior College, Tan wrote short stories and poems, sometimes on toilet paper squares she would flush away. Tan said she was classified as “the oddball, the slacker".

Tan studied English literature at the National University of Singapore. She then studied film production at Ngee Ann Polytechnic and New York University's Tisch School of the Arts.

== Personal life ==
Tan lived in Jeonju, South Korea, for a year as part of the Asian Young Filmmakers Forum. For the next 2 years, she lived in Chiang Mai and Bangkok in Thailand. During this time, she formed a rock band called Century Ache and had a shop at the Chatuchak Weekend Market where she sold T-shirts. A Thai fortune-teller once said to Tan: “The gods are confused about where you sleep.”

Tan moved to New York in 2008, where she obtained her MFA in Directing at New York University's Tisch School of the Arts.

Tan is blind in one eye.

== Career ==
Tan started her career with short films which were nominated many times at the Singapore International Film Festival. She was awarded Best Southeast Asian Film for Dahdi, Best Director for Fonzi, and Special Jury Prize for 10 Minutes Later. Her films are marked by a fascination with time and a bleak humour towards existence.

In 2017, Tan wrote and directed her debut feature film, Pop Aye. The film is about an architect who unexpectedly reunites with his long-lost elephant on the streets of Bangkok. The pair embark on a road trip across the country towards the rural farm where they grew up together.

Pop Aye premiered in competition at Sundance as the opening film of the World Dramatic selection, and was awarded a Special Jury Prize for Screenwriting. It went on to win the Golden Eye at the Zurich Film Festival for Best International Feature Film and the VPRO Big Screen Award at the International Film Festival Rotterdam. Pop Aye was the first Singaporean film to win a major award at Sundance and Rotterdam Film Festival. Prime Minister of Singapore Lee Hsien Loong noted Tan's achievement on social media. Tan's success in filmmaking was also mentioned in Parliament in April 2017 by Ong Ye Kung, the Minister for Education. The film was Singapore's official submission to the 2018 Academy Award for Best Foreign Language Film.

Tan was nominated as a Singaporean of The Year by the Straits Times in 2017.

Tan is a co-founder of the Asian Film Archive and nuSTUDIOS. She has also curated an Ingmar Bergman retrospective for the 2017 Swedish Film Festival in Singapore. Tan has cited Roy Andersson and Kurt Vonnegut as influences.

== Filmography ==
Year	Title	Notes
2005	10 Minutes Later	Short film
2007	Fonzi	Short film
2009	Sink	Short film
2010	Cold Noodles	Short film
2010	Thin Air	Short film
2015	Dahdi	Short film
2017	Wu Song Slays the Seductress 《武松殺嫂》	Short film
2017	Pop Aye	Feature film
