= Pop Aye =

2017 film

- Film poster
- Directed by: Kirsten Tan
- Written by: Kirsten Tan
- Produced by: Wenhong Huang; Zhang Jianbin; Weijie Lai; Deng Li
- Starring: Thaneth Warakulnukroh; Bong; Penpak Sirikul
- Cinematography: Chananun Chotrungroj
- Edited by: Lee Chatametikool
- Music by: Matthew James Kelly
- Release dates: 19 January 2017 (Sundance); 13 April 2017 (Singapore)
- Running time: 104 minutes
- Countries: Singapore; Thailand
- Language: Thai
- Box office: $132,534

Pop Aye is a 2017 Singaporean-Thai drama film directed by Kirsten Tan. A debut feature by Tan, the road film tells the story of a man as he tries to take his long-lost elephant back to their rural hometown. The first Singaporean film selected to screen at the Sundance, it competed and won a Special Jury Prize in the World Cinema Dramatic Competition section of the 2017 Sundance Film Festival. It was selected as the Singaporean entry for the Best Foreign Language Film at the 90th Academy Awards, but it was not nominated.

Tan's success at pursuing her dreams and interests in filmmaking was mentioned in Parliament in April 2017 by Ong Ye Kung, the Minister for Education (Higher Education and Skills), as he highlighted the need for parents in allowing their children to pursue their interests.

== Plot ==
Thana, a middle-aged architect, is disillusioned at work as well as at home with his wife B. One day, as he wanders the Bangkok city, he chances upon an elephant which turns out to be his childhood companion, Pop Aye. He then decides to take the elephant back to the rural village where they both grew up and into his uncle Peak's care. They embark on their homecoming journey through the rural Thailand to their hometown in Loei Province, Isan together.

== Cast ==
- Thaneth Warakulnukroh as Thana
- Bong as Pop Aye
- Penpak Sirikul as Bo
- Chaiwat Khumdee as Dee
- Yukontorn Sukkijja as Jenni
- Narong Pongpab as Peak

== Reception ==
On review aggregator Rotten Tomatoes, the film holds an approval rating of 90% based on 29 reviews, with a weighted average rating of 6.7/10. On Metacritic, the film has a weighted average score of 73 out of 100, based on 13 critics, indicating "generally favorable reviews".

Pop Aye screened to positive reviews in The Hollywood Reporter, Variety (magazine), Roger Ebert, and Screen International.

"Loneliness, alienation, the ache of nostalgia and the everyday absurdity of life infuse every encounter in the unconventional road trip. Like the journey it depicts, the first feature by New York-based, Singapore-raised writer-director Kirsten Tan is unhurried and unforgettable." The Hollywood Reporter

"Warm yet unsentimental, graced with the lightest touch of surrealism... (Tan) has also distilled her bohemian travels around the country into a fictional journey that's both authentically off-the-beaten track and something more metaphorical, with the elephant Pop Aye gradually assuming a significance on the level of Rosebud in “Citizen Kane.” Variety

== Accolades ==
Pop Aye premiered in competition at Sundance as the opening film of the World Dramatic selection, and was awarded a Special Jury Prize for Screenwriting. It went on to pick up the Golden Eye at the Zurich Film Festival for Best International Feature Film and the VPRO Big Screen Award at the International Film Festival Rotterdam. Pop Aye was the first Singaporean film to win a major award at Sundance and also at Rotterdam Film Festival. The film was also Singapore's official submission to the Academy Award for Best Foreign Language Film.

== See also ==
- List of submissions to the 90th Academy Awards for Best Foreign Language Film
- List of Singaporean submissions for the Academy Award for Best Foreign Language Film
