= 212 Warrior =

2018 Indonesian action comedy film

- Theatrical release poster
- Directed by: Angga Dwimas Sasongko
- Written by: Seno Gumira Ajidarma; Tumpal Tampubolon; Sheila Timothy
- Starring: Vino G. Bastian; Sherina Munaf; Marsha Timothy; Fariz Alfarizi; Happy Salma; Dwi Sasono; Yayan Ruhian; Cecep Arif Rahman
- Cinematography: Rahmat Syaiful
- Edited by: Teguh Raharjo
- Music by: Aria Prayogi
- Production companies: Lifelike Pictures; Fox International Productions
- Distributed by: 20th Century Fox
- Release date: 30 August 2018
- Country: Indonesia
- Language: Indonesian
- Budget: US$2 million
- Box office: US$3.8 million

212 Warrior (also known as Wiro Sableng 212 and Wiro Sableng Pendekar Kapak Maut Naga Geni 212) is a 2018 Indonesian action-comedy film based on the Wiro Sableng novel series by Bastian Tito. The movie is the first collaboration between an Indonesian studio and Fox International Productions.

A teaser for the film was released on 21 December 2017 throughout Indonesian theaters. It was uploaded online on a week later. The first trailer was released on 12 May 2018 and debuted on the LINE communications app. The film was released on 30 August 2018.

It was the last film from Fox International Productions before it was shut down in 2017 and was folded into 20th Century Fox International.

== Premise ==
In the 16th century of Nusantara, Wiro Sableng (Vino G. Bastian) is tasked by his mentor Sinto Gendeng (Ruth Marini) to capture her treacherous former student, Mahesa Birawa (Yayan Ruhian). Joined by his friends, Anggini (Sherina Munaf) & Bujang Gila Tapak Sakti (Fariz Alfarizi), Wiro will not only discover Mahesa's evil intention, but will also discover his true calling as a hero.

== Cast ==
- Vino G. Bastian as Wiro Sableng
- Sherina Munaf as Anggini
- Marsha Timothy as Bidadari Angin Timur
- Fariz Alfarizi as Bujang Gila Tapak Sakti
- Happy Salma as Suci
- Dwi Sasono as Raja Kamandaka
- Yayan Ruhian as Mahesa Birawa
- Cecep Arif Rahman as Bajak Laut Bagaspati
- Lukman Sardi as Werku Alit
- Ruth Marini as Sinto Gendeng
- T. Rifnu Wikana as Kalasrenggi
