= Leftovers (film) =

2016 film

- Film poster
- Directed by: Wicaksono Wisnu Legowo
- Written by: Wicaksono Wisnu Legowo
- Release dates: 28 November 2016 (Singapore IFF); 16 August 2017 (Indonesia)
- Country: Indonesia
- Language: Javanese

Leftovers, also known as Turah, is a 2016 Indonesian drama film directed by Wicaksono Wisnu Legowo. It was selected as the Indonesian entry for the Best Foreign Language Film at the 90th Academy Awards, but it was not nominated.

== Plot ==
Ten families go about their everyday lives in their remote Central Java village.

== See also ==
- List of submissions to the 90th Academy Awards for Best Foreign Language Film
- List of Indonesian submissions for the Academy Award for Best Foreign Language Film
