= Tradition (film) =

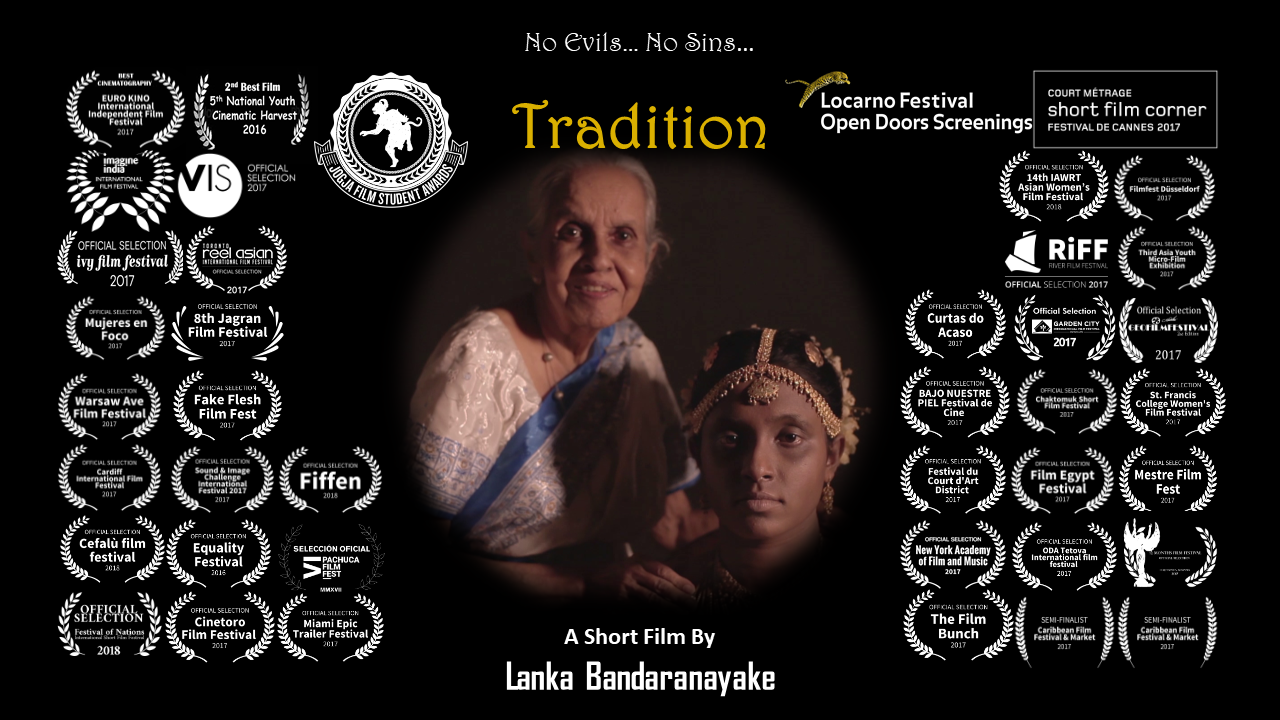
- Directed by: Lanka Bandaranayake
- Written by: Lanka Bandaranayake
- Screenplay by: Lanka Bandaranayake
- Produced by: Lanka Bandaranayake
- Starring: Kalum Gamlath; Irangani Serasinhga
- Cinematography: Vishwajith Karunarathna
- Edited by: Sankha Malwaththa
- Music by: Sumudu Guruge
- Production company: Lanka Cine
- Distributed by: Lanka CIne
- Release date: 2016
- Running time: 11 minutes
- Country: Sri Lanka
- Language: Sinhala

Tradition is a short film by Sri Lankan female director and actress Lanka Bandaranayake. It stars Irangani Serasinha.

== Plot ==
An old woman decorates a bride with traditional Sri Lankan jewellery. She describes the symbolic meaning of each jewellery piece. Those meanings carry the girl to her past relationships and their deep scars. The bride's destiny seems illusive.

== Cast ==
- Kalum Gamlath as Girl
- Irangani Serasinha as Woman
- Sameera Lakmal as Boy 01
- Nilanka Dahanayaka as Boy 02
- Arunod Wijesinha as Boy 03
- Kalana Gunasekara as Boy 04
- Anjana Premarathna as Boy 05
- Rajeev Ananda as Man
