= Thundenek =

Sri Lankan film

- Directed by: Asoka Handagama; Vimukthi Jayasundara; Prasanna Vithanage
- Written by: Asoka Handagama; Vimukthi Jayasundara; Prasanna Vithanage
- Produced by: Office for National Unity and Reconciliation, the Government of Sri Lanka
- Cinematography: Channa Deshapriya; M. D. Mahindapala; Eeshit Narain
- Edited by: Saman Elvitigala; Ravindra Guruge; A. Sreekar Prasad
- Music by: K (composer); Kapila Poogalaarachchi
- Release date: 27 February 2018
- Running time: 116 minutes
- Country: Sri Lanka
- Language: Sinhala

Thundenek (Sinhala: තුන්දෙනෙක්), marketed theatrically as Her. Him. The Other, is a 2018 Sri Lankan Sinhala tri-segmented anthology film. The film is directed by three award-winning Sri Lankan filmmakers: Asoka Handagama, Vimukthi Jayasundara and Prasanna Vithanage. Produced by The Office for National Unity and Reconciliation (a Department of the Government of Sri Lanka), the film is scored by K. Krishna Kumar and Kapila Poogalaarachchi. The film premiered on 19 February 2018 at the Tharanganee Film Hall to mostly positive reviews from critics.

The film revolves around three separate stories linked to postwar experiences and ethnic conflict in Sri Lankan society. The film is also titled Her. Him. The Other due to this narrative structure.

== Plot ==
- Her: Directed by Prasanna Vithanage, the segment is about a pro-LTTE videographer, Kesa, who travels around Jaffna in search of a lady called referred to as "Her".
- Him: Directed by Vimukthi Jayasundara, the segment revolves around a Sinhala teacher who begins to believe in the rebirth of a Tamil militant into a Sinhala family.
- The Other: Directed by Asoka Handagama, the final segment is about Tamil mother who comes Colombo in search of her son.

== Cast ==
- Asoka Handagama
- Keshvarajan Nawarathnam
- Nipuni Sharadha
- Pradeep Ramawikrama
- Darshana Vidhya Aravinda
