= Looking for Lucky (film) =

- Directed by: Jiang Jiacheng
- Written by: Jiang Jiacheng
- Produced by: Liu Jingya
- Starring: Ding Xinhe; Yu Hai; Da Bing; Dong Lifan; Dong Longbin; Jia Tianming; Huang Jingxin
- Cinematography: Jiang Jianbing
- Edited by: Jiang Jiacheng
- Production company: Heyi Pictures
- Release date: 2 April 2018
- Running time: 101 minutes
- Country: United States
- Language: English

Looking for Lucky is a 2018 Chinese comedy drama film directed by Jiang Jiacheng, starring Ding Xinhe, Yu Hai, Da Bing, Dong Lifan, Dong Longbin, Jia Tianming and Huang Jingxin.

== Cast ==
- Ding Xinhe as Guangsheng
- Yu Hai
- Da Bing
- Dong Lifan
- Dong Longbin
- Jia Tianming
- Huang Jingxin

== Reception ==
Elizabeth Kerr of The Hollywood Reporter wrote that "Jiang’s gentle satire is really allowed to blossom with the time it is given to breathe during those long takes, a mature creative choice for a young filmmaker to make. It was the right one this time around, and it effortlessly immerses viewers into the story’s opportunistic environment."

Sarah Ward of Screen Daily gave the film a positive review and wrote, "Brimming with aesthetic confidence, emotional candour and thematic conviction, Looking for Lucky certainly isn’t looking for a voice, a style or something to say, marking its guiding hand as a talent to watch."
