= The Seen and Unseen =

2017 film by Kamila Andini

- Film poster
- Indonesian: Sekala Niskala
- Directed by: Kamila Andini
- Screenplay by: Kamila Andini
- Produced by: Gita Fara; Ifa Isfansyah
- Starring: Ayu Laksmi; Ida Bagus Putu Radithya Mahijasena; Ni Kadek Thaly Titi Kasih; I Ketut Rina; Happy Salma; Gusti Ayu Raka
- Cinematography: Anggi Frisca
- Edited by: Dinda Amanda; Dwi Agus Purwanto
- Music by: Yasuhiro Morinaga
- Production companies: Fourcolours Films; Treewater Productions
- Release dates: 16 September 2017 (TIFF); 8 March 2018
- Running time: 86 minutes
- Country: Indonesia
- Languages: Balinese; Indonesian

The Seen and Unseen (Indonesian: Sekala Niskala) is a 2017 drama film directed and written by Kamila Andini.

== Cast ==
- Ni Kadek Thaly Titi Kasih as Tantri
- Ida Bagus Putu Radithya Mahijasena as Tantra
- Ayu Laksmi as Mother
- I Ketut Rina as Father
- Happy Salma as Nurse Ida
- Gusti Ayu Raka as Grandmother

== Release ==
The Seen and Unseen had its world premiere at the Toronto International Film Festival in September 2017, competing for the Platform Prize. The film received lively applause from the audience during the world premiere. The film had its Asian premiere at the 22nd Busan International Film Festival during the program, A Window on Asian Cinema. The film was also screened at the 68th Berlin International Film Festival during the Generation program as its European premiere.

The film was theatrically released nationwide on 8 March 2018.

== Reception ==
On the review aggregator website Rotten Tomatoes, 100% of eight critics' reviews are positive, with an average rating of 9.3/10.

Elizabeth Kerr of The Hollywood Reporter praised Andini's interpretation of child trauma and called the film "a quietly powerful portrait of childhood grief". Maggie Lee of Variety described the film as a "haunting and hypnotic interpretation of the child subconscious rooted in Balinese arts and culture".

== Accolades ==
Award	Date	Category	Recipient	Result	Ref.
Asia Pacific Screen Awards	23 November 2017	Best Youth Feature Film	The Seen and Unseen	Won	
Tempo Film Festival	27 November 2017	Best Film	The Seen and Unseen	Nominated	
Tempo Film Festival	27 November 2017	Best Director	Kamila Andini	Nominated	
Tempo Film Festival	27 November 2017	Best Screenplay	Kamila Andini	Nominated	
Tempo Film Festival	27 November 2017	Best Child Actor	Ni Kadek Thaly Titi Kasih	Nominated	
Tempo Film Festival	27 November 2017	Best Child Actor	Ida Bagus Putu Radithya Mahijasena	Nominated	
Jogja-NETPAC Asian Film Festival	7 December 2017	Golden Hanoman Award	The Seen and Unseen	Won	
Berlin International Film Festival	24 February 2018	Grand Prix – Generation Kplus	The Seen and Unseen	Won	
Indonesian Film Festival	9 December 2018	Best Picture	Gita Fara and Ifa Isfansyah	Nominated	
Indonesian Film Festival	9 December 2018	Best Director	Kamila Andini	Nominated	
Indonesian Film Festival	9 December 2018	Best Supporting Actress	Ayu Laksmi	Nominated	
Indonesian Film Festival	9 December 2018	Best Original Screenplay	Kamila Andini	Nominated	
Indonesian Film Festival	9 December 2018	Best Sound	Trisno, Hadrianus Eko and Yasuhiro Morinaga	Nominated	
Indonesian Film Festival	9 December 2018	Best Child Actor	Ni Kadek Thaly Titi Kasih	Won	
Indonesian Film Festival	9 December 2018	Best Child Actor	Ida Bagus Putu Radithya Mahijasena	Nominated	
Indonesian Film Festival	9 December 2018	Best Cinematography	Anggi Frisca	Nominated	
Indonesian Film Festival	9 December 2018	Best Editing	Dinda Amanda and Dwi Agus Purwanto	Nominated	
