= Sultan Agung Mataram 1628 =

2018 Indonesian historical film

Sultan Agung Mataram 1628 is a 2018 Indonesian historical film directed by Hanung Bramantyo.

The film is about Sultan Agung Hanyakrakusuma (1593–1646), third king of the Mataram Sultanate, who reigned between 1613 and 1646.

== Production ==
Zainal Darma Abidin researched the background to the movie for four years from 2007 until 2011 in order to create the film. The research took place in Leiden University, the Amsterdam Museum, the remains of Mataram in Kota Gede, Yogya and Kartasura Palace, Imogiri Kings Cemetery, Jakarta Old City and Sunda Kelapa port, the remains of the Batavia Castle, as well as discussion with historians.
