= Kamila Andini =

Indonesian film director

- Andini in 2026
- Born: 6 May 1986 (age 40); Jakarta, Indonesia
- Citizenship: Indonesian
- Education: Deakin University
- Occupation: Director
- Notable work: The Mirror Never Lies
- Spouse: Ifa Isfansyah
- Parent: Garin Nugroho

Kamila Andini (born 6 May 1986) is an Indonesian film director known for her critically acclaimed debut, The Mirror Never Lies.

== Biography ==
Andini was born on 6 May 1986 and is the eldest daughter of filmmaker Garin Nugroho. Although uninterested in cinematography for fear that she would be "work[ing] in her father's shadow", she began studying photography while still in junior high school, hoping to "capture people's life and behavior". While in senior high school her classmates often asked her father about film making, questions which Andini later said "ashamed" her because she knew nothing of her father's oeuvre. She later began to become involved with several film committees. Andini completed a degree in sociology at Deakin University in Melbourne, Australia.

== Career ==
Upon her return to Indonesia, Andini began to work as a director. She handled music videos for groups such as Ungu and Slank, as well as documentaries on music and the ocean. One of these, Lagu untuk Tukik (A Song for Tukik), dealt with turtles in the ocean in the Wakatobi Regency – part of the Coral Triangle – and was screened as part of the Goethe Institute's Science Film Festival in 2012. In 2009, she assisted her father in directing Generasi Biru (The Blue Generation), about the band Slank.

Andini began production of her first feature film, The Mirror Never Lies, in 2009. The work took over two years of research and two months of filming to complete, owing to a lack of documentary evidence on the Bajau who are central to the film's narrative. Co-produced by Andini's father and former Miss Indonesia Nadine Chandrawinata and starring Atiqah Hasiholan, Reza Rahadian, and Gita Novalista, the film was based on a young Bajau girl who uses mirrors to try to find her lost father. It received numerous awards both domestically and internationally, including a Best Director nomination at the 2011 Indonesian Film Festival (IFF) before winning in the same category at the 2012's Bandung Film Festival.

In May 2012, she started working on her second feature film, to be about children and nature. This became The Seen and Unseen (2017), a critically acclaimed work about young Balinese twins, one of whom is dying. It won the Adelaide Film Festival's Feature Fiction Award in 2019.

Her 2021 film Yuni premiered at the 2021 Toronto International Film Festival where it won the Platform Prize. In 2022 Andini's fourth feature film Before, Now & Then had its world premiere at the 72nd Berlin International Film Festival.

In 2023, she explored Indonesia's social history through her Netflix original series Cigarette Girl. The story is set within Indonesia's tobacco industry and was directed alongside her partner Ifa Isfansyah.

In August 2026, Four Seasons In Java was announced to be premiered on the 2026 Toronto International Film Festival on September 11, 2026.

== Personal life ==
In March 2012 Andini married fellow director Ifa Isfansyah. The two fell in love with each other after Isfansyah's 2011 film Sang Penari (The Dancer) had provided stiff competition to Andini's The Mirror Never Lies at the IFF.

== Filmography ==
=== Feature films ===
Year	English Title	Original Title	Notes
2011	The Mirror Never Lies	Laut Bercermin	
2017	The Seen and Unseen	Sekala Niskala	
2021	Yuni		
2022	Before, Now & Then	Nana	
2026	Four Seasons in Java	Empat Musim Pertiwi	Post-production

=== Other credits ===
Year	Title	Director	Writer	Producer	Notes
2015	Following Diana	Yes	Yes	No	Short film
2016	Chaotic Love Poems	No	No	Yes	
2018	Sekar	Yes	No	Yes	Short film
2019	Mountain Song	No	No	Yes	
2023	Cigarette Girl	Yes	No	No	TV series on Netflix

== Works cited ==
- "FAQ (Tanya-Jawab)". Official Website for The Mirror Never Lies. Jakarta: WWF Indonesia.
- "Kamila Andini". filmindonesia.or.id (in Indonesian). Jakarta: Konfiden Foundation. Archived from the original on 24 January 2013.
- Kurniasari, Triwik (18 December 2011). "A Vibrant Year for the Film Industry". The Jakarta Post. Archived from the original on 8 January 2012.
- Kurniasari, Triwik (15 May 2011). "Kamila Andini : Filming Close to the Heart". The Jakarta Post. Archived from the original on 15 September 2011.
- Mahditama, Iman (6 November 2012). "Making science fun for kids". The Jakarta Post. p. 21. Archived from the original on 10 November 2012.
- "Penghargaan The Mirror Never Lies" [Awards for The Mirror Never Lies]. filmindonesia.or.id (in Indonesian). Jakarta: Konfidan Foundation. Archived from the original on 7 April 2014.
- Siregar, Lisa (29 April 2011). "Reflecting on the Lives of the Bajo". The Jakarta Globe.
- "The Mirror Never Lies". filmindonesia.or.id (in Indonesian). Jakarta: Konfidan Foundation. Archived from the original on 1 September 2013.
- Tumpak (15 May 2012). "Kamila Andini: Saya Enggak Percaya" [Kamila Andini: I Don't Believe It]. Tabloid Nova.
- Webb, Cynthia (17 October 2012). "Kamila Andini: Two Indonesian Films Compete in the APSA 2012". The Jakarta Post. p. 23. Archived from the original on 19 October 2012.
