= Jogja-NETPAC Asian Film Festival =

Annual film festival held in Yogyakarta, Indonesia

- Location: Yogyakarta, Indonesia
- Founded: 7 August 2006; 20 years ago
- Awards: Golden Hanoman Award and others
- Website: jaff-filmfest.org

The Jogja-NETPAC Asian Film Festival (JAFF) is an annual film festival held in Yogyakarta, Indonesia. The festival has partnered with the Network for the Promotion of Asian Cinema (NETPAC) since its inaugural edition in 2006. It aims to introduce Asian cinema to a wider audience and provides a space for arts, culture, and tourism.

The most recent edition, 20th Jogja-NETPAC Asian Film Festival was held from 29 November to 6 December 2025.

== History ==
Several Indonesian filmmakers, Garin Nugroho, Ifa Isfansyah, Budi Irawanto, Yosep Anggi Noen, Ajish Dibyo, Dyna Herlina and Ismail Basbeth along with NETPAC curator Philip Cheah, initiated the festival.

The first edition of the festival was held from 7 to 12 August 2006, about three months after the 2006 Yogyakarta earthquake. Kompas noted that the inaugural edition marked the recovery of Yogyakarta post-earthquake. Meanwhile, Eric Sasono of Tempo noted that the festival created a new film market to develop the Asian cinema even further.

== Programs ==
As of 2022, the Jogja-NETPAC Asian Film Festival is organized in various sections:

- Main Competition: feature films compete for Hanoman Awards and NETPAC Award, the most prestigious awards of the festival.
- Light of Asia: short films compete for Blencong Award, screened in compilations
- Indonesian Screen Awards: Indonesian feature films compete for six categories.
- Panorama: selection of feature films screened during the international film festivals previously.
- Asian Perspectives: encapsulates feature films which showcase different Asian perspectives.
- Indonesian Film Showcase: showcases Indonesian feature films out of competition.
- Classic: revisiting the history by showcasing films by certain notable directors
- Emerging: presentation of films by directors whose work shown at JAFF for the first time
- JAFF-Series: showcases series
- Community Screen (Layar Komunitas): screenings and discussions with several film communities
- Whisper Cinema (Bioskop Bisik): film screenings where blind and visually impaired people are guided by volunteers that verbally describe a film sequence.
- JFA Showcase: showcases the work of the Jogja Film Academy students.
- JAFF Market: In 2024, the festival debuted a new program, JAFF Market, an initiative aimed at reshaping the Indonesian film industry by fostering networking and collaboration among various sectors.

== Awards ==
The most prestigious award given at JAFF is the Golden Hanoman Award for best film. As of 2025, the festival has presented the following awards:

=== Competition ===
- Golden Hanoman Award – best film

Golden Hanoman Award
Year	Film	Director	Country/Region
2006	Men at Work	Mani Haghighi	Iran
2007	Crossing the Dust	Shawkat Amin Korki	Iraq
2008	Kantata Takwa	Eros Djarot, Gotot Prakosa	Indonesia
2009	Agrarian Utopia	Uruphong Raksasad	Thailand
2010	Survival Song	Guangyi Yu	China
2011	Ang Damgo ni Eleuteria Kirchbaum	Remton Siega Zuasola	Philippines
2012	Bunohan	Dain Iskandar Said	Malaysia
2013	Television	Mostofa Sarwar Farooki	Bangladesh
2014	Nagima	Zhanna Issabayeva	Kazakhstan
2015	Cambodian Son	Masahiro Sugano	Cambodia
2016	Solo, Solitude	Yosep Anggi Noen	Indonesia
2017	The Seen and Unseen	Kamila Andini	Indonesia
2018	27 Steps of May	Ravi Bharwani	Indonesia
2019	House of Hummingbird	Kim Bora	South Korea
2020	No awards given		
2021	Taste	Lê Bảo	Vietnam
2022	Autobiography	Makbul Mubarak	Indonesia
2023	Monisme	Riar Rizaldi	Indonesia, Qatar
2024	Happyend	Neo Sora	Japan, United States
2025	Becoming Human	Polen Ly	Cambodia
2026	TBA		

- Silver Hanoman Award – runner-up of best film
- NETPAC Award – rewards to best first or second feature of Asian directors, chosen by Network for the Promotion of Asian Cinema
- Geber Award – rewards to best first or second feature of Asian directors, chosen by film communities around Indonesia

=== Indonesian Screen Awards ===
Rewards to best work on Indonesian feature films

- Best Film
- Best Directing
- Best Performance
- Best Cinematography
- Best Editing
- Best Screenplay
- Best Music
- Best Sound Design
- Best Production Design
- Best Poster

=== Shorts ===
- Blencong Award – best short film
- Student Award – best short film, chosen by representatives of film students in Yogyakarta
