= Kimo Stamboel =

Indonesian filmmaker

- Born: Mochammad Stamboel; June 25, 1980 (age 46); Jakarta, Indonesia
- Citizenship: Indonesia
- Occupations: Director; producer; writer
- Years active: 2004–present

Kimo Stamboel (born Mochammad Maliki Stamboel on 25 June 1980) is an Indonesian film director, producer, and screenwriter. He is known for his works on the horror genres both as himself and also as part of The Mo Brothers with friend Timo Tjahjanto.

Stamboel launched his filmmaking career in 2004 with the release of his directorial debut Bunian in 2004 and achieved mainstream success with the release of slasher hit Macabre (also known as Rumah Dara) in 2009. The duo received a Citra Award for Best Director nomination in 2016 for Headshot.

== Early life ==
Kimo went to school in Australia, where he met future collaborator Timo Tjahjanto.

== Career ==
=== 2004–2016: Directorial debut and The Mo Brothers ===
In 2004, Stamboel released his feature film debut Bunian based on a screenplay he co-wrote with Virra I. Dewi. The shooting took place in Sydney, Australia, where he was studying at the time. Filming took place over the course of 2002 and 2003 as the crew and cast were only available during the weekends. Timo Tjahjanto, who would later become his partner as The Mo Brothers, worked on the film as a freelance cameraman.

Working together as co-directors for the first time, Tjahjanto and Stamboel released the 2007 short film Dara. The short was later included in the 2008 anthology film Takut: Faces of Fear. Well received by the public, they decided to develop a feature film based on the short and released Macabre in 2009 with Julie Estelle and Shareefa Daanish in the lead roles. The film received praise during its run at several film festivals and launched the two into mainstream recognition. Stamboel and Tjahjanto appeared among the patrons of Herosase in Joko Anwar's The Forbidden Door.

Stamboel and Tjahjanto then directed, produced, and wrote the horror-thriller Killers which premiered at the 2014 Sundance Film Festival. It received positive reviews upon release with a 73% fresh score on Rotten Tomatoes. Their next project was the 2016 action film Headshot which stars Iko Uwais and Chelsea Islan. For their work on Headshot, Stamboel and Tjahjanto were nominated for Best Director at the 2016 Citra Award but lost to Riri Riza (Athirah).

=== 2017–present: DreadOut, The Queen of Black Magic, and upcoming projects ===
Stamboel's next project was announced in 2018 to be an adaptation of popular horror-fantasy online game DreadOut. He began writing a screenplay for the film adaptation in 2014 but eventually decided to create an origin story while working closely with the game developers. The film was released in January 2019. While working on DreadOut, Stamboel also served as a co-producer in Timo Tjahjanto's The Night Comes for Us which was released by Netflix in October 2018.

He followed this up with the release of The Queen of Black Magic (Ratu Ilmu Hitam), a remake of the 1981 horror classic film of the same name produced by Rapi Films in November 2019. Joko Anwar wrote the screenplay while Ario Bayu and Hannah Al Rashid lead the ensemble cast. At the 2020 Citra Award, the film won two awards out of six nominations with Ade Firman Hakim winning Best Supporting Actor and Gaga Nugraha winning Best Visual Effects.

In February 2020, Stamboel's directing partner Timo Tjahjanto on his Twitter account hinting at a possible sequel to Macabre. However, no official confirmation has been made.

Stamboel will replace Rizal Mantovani in the director's seat of the third Jailangkung film. He will also co-write the screenplay with Rinaldy Puspoyo. The film will have a new cast with Citra Award nominated actress Titi Kamal (Mendadak Dangdut), Dwi Sasono, Syifa Hadju, and Muzakki Ramdhan in starring roles.

== Filmography ==
Year	Title	Director	Writer	Producer	Notes
2004	Bunian	Yes	Yes	No	Also editor
2013	V/H/S/2	No	No	Yes	Segment "Safe Haven"
2018	The Night Comes for Us	No	No	Yes	
2019	Portals	No	No	Yes	Segment "Sarah"
2019	DreadOut	Yes	Yes	Yes	
2019	The Queen of Black Magic	Yes	No	No	
2022	Ivanna	Yes	No	No	
2022	Jailangkung: Sandekala	Yes	Yes	No	
2023	Blood Curse	Yes	Yes	No	Web series
2023	Sewu Dino	Yes	No	No	
2024	Dancing Village: The Curse Begins	Yes	No	No	
2025	The Elixir	Yes	Yes	Yes	
2025	Janur Ireng	Yes	Yes	No	
TBA	One Good Thing	Yes	No	No	

=== With Timo Tjahjanto (As The Mo Brothers) ===
Year	Title	Director	Writer	Producer	Editor	Notes
2007	Dara	Yes	Yes	Yes	Yes	Short film
2008	Takut: Faces of Fear	Yes	Yes	Yes	Yes	Segment "Dara"
2009	Macabre	Yes	Yes	Yes	No	
2014	Killers	Yes	Yes	Yes	No	
2016	Headshot	Yes	Yes	No	No	

== Awards and nominations ==
Year	Award	Category	Work	Result	Notes
2007	Freak Show Horror Film Festival	Audience Choice Award	Dara	Won	as The Mo Brothers
2007	New York City Horror Film Festival	Audience Award	Dara	Won	as The Mo Brothers
2009	Bucheon International Fantastic Film Festival	Best of Bucheon	Macabre	Nominated	as The Mo Brothers
2010	Jakarta International Film Festival	Best Indonesian Film	Macabre	Won	as The Mo Brothers
2011	KasKus untuk Film Indonesia	Best Film	Macabre	Won	as The Mo Brothers
2016	Fantaspoa International Fantastic Film Festival	Best Bloodbath Honorable Mention for International Film	Killers	Won	as The Mo Brothers
2016	L'Étrange Festival	International Feature Film	Headshot	Won	as The Mo Brothers shared with They Call Me Jeeg
2016	36th Citra Award	Best Director	Headshot	Nominated	as The Mo Brothers
2020	Sitges Film Festival	Midnight X-Treme Award	The Queen of Black Magic	Won	
