= XYZ Films =

American motion picture company

- Type: Private
- Industry: Film
- Founded: 2008; 18 years ago in Los Angeles, California, United States
- Founders: Aram Tertzakian; Nate Bolotin; Nick Spicer
- Headquarters: Los Angeles, California, United States
- Services: Film production, sales and distribution
- Website: xyzfilms.com

XYZ Films is an American independent film production, distribution, and sales company founded in 2008 by Aram Tertzakian, Nate Bolotin and Nick Spicer, and is based in Los Angeles. It focuses on international genre films, including The Raid: Redemption, The Raid 2, and On the Job.

According to an article from Variety, XYZ Films has licensed more than 200 films since 2009. It has produced a handful of Netflix original films, including Apostle (2018), The Night Comes For Us (2018), and I Don't Feel at Home in this World Anymore (2017), among others.

== History ==
XYZ Films was founded by Aram Tertzakian, Nate Bolotin, and Nick Spicer, who met at the University of California, Los Angeles. All had worked previously in the industry. Todd Brown, editor-in-chief of film website Twitch Film, joined after they invested there. Early deals included one with Time Inc. that did not produce any projects but raised their profile. Believing the market in the US to be too small, they invested in international genre films.

The Raid: Redemption, an Indonesian action film that was produced on a budget of around $1 million, grossed over $14 million worldwide. They partnered with French film distributor Celluloid Dreams in 2010, and, in 2013, they expanded beyond North American sales into international sales. XYZ limits budgets to keep costs down, then markets films to genre fans based on its reputation. XYZ said they focus on commercial films that still take risks. In 2015, they partnered with distributor Abbolita Films.

In October 2017, XYZ Films founders Aram Tertzakian, Nate Bolotin and Nick Spicer were listed in Variety's New Leaders in Film featured profile. Their 2017 film I Don't Feel at Home in this World Anymore was awarded the Grand Jury Prize in Drama at the 2017 Sundance Film Festival.

In 2023, XYZ announced the creation of the New Visions label for speculative fiction and horror films by new and emerging directors. The first film to premiere as a New Visions release was Zarrar Kahn's In Flames.

== Selected filmography ==
Motion pictures by XYZ Films, listed by theatrical release date
2010s
| Year | Film | Director | Cast | Release date |
|---|---|---|---|---|
| 2011 | Greetings to the Devil | Juan Felipe Orozco | | August 12, 2011 |
| 2012 | The Raid: Redemption | Gareth Evans | Iko Uwais, Joe Taslim, Donny Alamsyah, Ray Sahetapy & Yayan Ruhian | March 23, 2012 |
| 2012 | Errors of the Human Body | Eron Sheean | Michael Eklund | July 28, 2012 |
| 2012 | Save the Date | Michael Mohan | Lizzy Caplan & Alison Brie | November 8, 2012 |
| 2013 | The Rambler | Calvin Reeder | Dermot Mulroney, Lindsay Pulsipher, Natasha Lyonne, & James Cady | January 21, 2013 |
| 2013 | Frankenstein's Army | Richard Raaphorst | Karel Roden, Joshua Sasse, Luke Newberry, Alexander Mercury, Robert Gwilym, Andrei Zayats, Mark Stevenson, & Hon Ping Tang | July 26, 2013 |
| 2013 | Big Bad Wolves | Aharon Keshales & Navot Papushado | | August 15, 2013 |
| 2013 | On the Job | Erik Matti | Gerald Anderson, Joel Torre, Joey Marquez, & Piolo Pascual | September 27, 2013 |
| 2013 | The Dirties | Matt Johnson | | October 4, 2013 |
| 2013 | Avenged | Michael S. Ojeda | | October 15, 2013 |
| 2013 | Wolf | Jim Taihattu | | December 19, 2013 |
| 2014 | Killers | Mo Brothers | Kazuki Kitamura & Oka Antara | February 1, 2014 |
| 2014 | Dead Snow: Red vs. Dead | Tommy Wirkola | | February 12, 2014 |
| 2014 | Parts per Billion | Brian Horiuchi | Frank Langella, Gena Rowlands, Rosario Dawson, Penn Badgley, Teresa Palmer, & Josh Hartnett | March 25, 2014 |
| 2014 | The Raid 2 | Gareth Evans | Iko Uwais, Arifin Putra, Oka Antara, Tio Pakusadewo, Alex Abbad, Julie Estelle, Ryuhei Matsuda, Kenichi Endō, & Kazuki Kitamura | March 28, 2014 |
| 2014 | Stage Fright | Jerome Sable | | May 9, 2014 |
| 2014 | These Final Hours | Zak Hilditch | Nathan Phillips & Angourie Rice | July 31, 2014 |
| 2014 | Electric Boogaloo: The Wild, Untold Story of Cannon Films | Mark Hartley | | August 2, 2014 |
| 2014 | Life After Beth | Jeff Baena | Aubrey Plaza, Dane DeHaan, Molly Shannon, Cheryl Hines, Paul Reiser, Matthew Gray Gubler, & John C. Reilly | August 15, 2014 |
| 2014 | Out of the Dark | Lluís Quílez | Julia Stiles, Scott Speedman, & Stephen Rea | August 27, 2014 |
| 2014 | Redeemer | Ernesto Díaz Espinoza | Marko Zaror & Noah Segan | September 19, 2014 |
| 2014 | At the Devil's Door | Nicholas McCarthy | | September 12, 2014 |
| 2014 | Tusk | Kevin Smith | Michael Parks, Justin Long, Haley Joel Osment, Genesis Rodriguez & Johnny Depp | September 19, 2014 |
| 2014 | The Dead Lands | Toa Fraser | | October 30, 2014 |
| 2015 | Preservation | Christopher Denham | | January 9, 2015 |
| 2015 | Spring | Justin Benson & Aaron Moorhead | Lou Taylor Pucci & Nadia Hilker | March 20, 2015 |
| 2015 | River | Jamie M. Dagg | | June 1, 2015 |
| 2015 | Stung | Benni Diez | Matt O'Leary, Jessica Cook, Lance Henriksen, Clifton Collins Jr., Cecilia Pillado, & Eve Slatner | July 3, 2015 |
| 2016 | Baskin | Can Evrenol | | January 1, 2016 |
| 2016 | The Invitation | Karyn Kusama | Logan Marshall-Green, Tammy Blanchard, Michiel Huisman, & Emayatzy Corinealdi | April 8, 2016 |
| 2016 | Holidays | Various directors | Various actors | April 22, 2016 |
| 2016 | Mercy | Chris Sparling | | June 4, 2016 |
| 2016 | Yoga Hosers | Kevin Smith | Harley Quinn Smith, Lily-Rose Depp & Johnny Depp | September 2, 2016 |
| 2016 | Operation Avalanche | Matt Johnson | | September 16, 2016 |
| 2016 | ARQ | Tony Elliott | Robbie Amell & Rachael Taylor | September 16, 2016 |
| 2016 | Under the Shadow | Babak Anvari | Narges Rashidi, Avin Manshadi, Bobby Naderi, Ray Haratian, & Arash Marandi | September 30, 2016 |
| 2016 | The Oath | Baltasar Kormákur | | September 6, 2016 |
| 2016 | Headshot | Mo Brothers | Iko Uwais, Chelsea Islan, Sunny Pang, Julie Estelle, David Hendrawan, Zack Lee, Very Tri Yulisman, Bront Palarae, & Yayu Unru | December 8, 2016 |
| 2017 | iBoy | Adam Randall | Bill Milner & Maisie Williams | January 27, 2017 |
| 2017 | XX | Various directors | Natalie Brown, Melanie Lynskey, Breeda Wool, & Christina Kirk | February 17, 2017 |
| 2017 | I Don't Feel at Home in this World Anymore | Macon Blair | Melanie Lynskey, Elijah Wood, David Yow, Jane Levy, & Devon Graye | February 24, 2017 |
| 2017 | The Void | Steven Kostanski & Jeremy Gillespie | Aaron Poole, Kenneth Welsh, Daniel Fathers, Kathleen Munroe, & Ellen Wong | March 21, 2017 |
| 2017 | Pilgrimage | Brendan Muldowney | Tom Holland, Richard Armitage, & Jon Bernthal | April 23, 2017 |
| 2017 | Kuso | Steven Ellison | Various actors | July 21, 2017 |
| 2017 | Bushwick | Jonathan Milott & Cary Murnion | Dave Bautista & Brittany Snow | August 25, 2017 |
| 2017 | Brawl in Cell Block 99 | S. Craig Zahler | Vince Vaughn, Jennifer Carpenter, Don Johnson, Udo Kier, Marc Blucas, & Tom Guiry | October 6, 2017 |
| 2017 | 6 Days | Toa Fraser | Jamie Bell, Abbie Cornish, Mark Strong, & Martin Shaw | November 3, 2017 |
| 2017 | Sweet Virginia | Jamie M. Dagg | Jon Bernthal, Christopher Abbott, Imogen Poots, Rosemarie DeWitt, Odessa Young, & Jared Abrahamson | November 17, 2017 |
| 2017 | Beyond Skyline | Liam O'Donnell | Frank Grillo, Bojana Novakovic, Jonny Weston, Iko Uwais, Callan Mulvey, Yayan Ruhian, Pamelyn Chee, Betty Gabriel, & Antonio Fargas | December 15, 2017 |
| 2018 | Mom and Dad | Brian Taylor | Nicolas Cage & Selma Blair | January 19, 2018 |
| 2018 | I Kill Giants | Anders Walter | Madison Wolfe, Imogen Poots, Sydney Wade, Rory Jackson, Art Parkinson, Noel Clarke, Jennifer Ehle, & Zoe Saldaña | March 23, 2018 |
| 2018 | The Cleanse | Bobby Miller | Johnny Galecki, Anna Friel, Oliver Platt, Anjelica Huston, Kyle Gallner, Kevin J. O'Connor, & Diana Bang | May 4, 2018 |
| 2018 | In Darkness | Anthony Byrne | Natalie Dormer, Ed Skrein, Emily Ratajkowski, & Joely Richardson | May 25, 2018 |
| 2018 | Our House | Anthony Scott Burns | Thomas Mann, Kate Moyer, Nicola Peltz, & Percy Hynes White | July 27, 2018 |
| 2018 | BuyBust | Erik Matti | Anne Curtis & Brandon Vera | August 1, 2018 |
| 2018 | Mandy | Panos Cosmatos | Nicolas Cage, Andrea Riseborough, Linus Roache, Ned Dennehy, Olwen Fouéré, Richard Brake, & Bill Duke | September 14, 2018 |
| 2018 | Apostle | Gareth Evans | Dan Stevens, Lucy Boynton, Mark Lewis Jones, Bill Milner, Kristine Froseth, Paul Higgins, & Michael Sheen | October 12, 2018 |
| 2018 | The Night Comes For Us | Timo Tjahjanto | Iko Uwais, Joe Taslim, Julie Estelle, Sunny Pang, Zack Lee, & Shareefa Daanish | October 19, 2018 |
| 2018 | Anna and the Apocalypse | John McPhail | Ella Hunt, Malcolm Cumming, Sarah Swire, Christopher Leveaux, Marli Siu, Ben Wiggins, Mark Benton, & Paul Kaye | November 30, 2018 |
| 2019 | The Standoff at Sparrow Creek | Henry Dunham | | January 18, 2019 |
| 2019 | Arctic | Joe Penna | | February 1, 2019 |
| 2019 | The Prodigy | Nicholas McCarthy | Taylor Schilling, Jackson Robert Scott, & Colm Feore | February 8, 2019 |
| 2019 | Framing John DeLorean | Don Argott & Sheena M. Joyce | Alec Baldwin, Morena Baccarin, Josh Charles, Dean Winters, Michael Rispoli, & Jason Jones | June 7, 2019 |
| 2019 | Jallikattu | Lijo Jose Pellissery | Antony Varghese, Chemban Vinod Jose, Sabumon Abdusamad, & Santhy Balachandran | October 4, 2019 |
| 2019 | Code 8 | Jeff Chan | Stephen & Robbie Amell | December 13, 2019 |
2020s
| 2020 | Color Out of Space | Richard Stanley | | January 24, 2020 |
| 2020 | Come to Daddy | Ant Timpson | | February 7, 2020 |
| 2020 | Vivarium | Lorcan Finnegan | | March 27, 2020 |
| 2020 | Archive | Gavin Rothery | | July 10, 2020 |
| 2020 | Cut Throat City | RZA | | July 31, 2020 |
| 2020 | The Silencing | Robin Pront | | August 14, 2020 |
| 2020 | Sputnik | Egor Abramenko | | August 14, 2020 |
| 2020 | The Owners | Julian Berg | | September 4, 2020 |
| 2020 | Alone | John Hyams | | September 18, 2020 |
| 2020 | 2067 | Seth Larney | | October 2, 2020 |
| 2020 | The Wolf of Snow Hollow | Jim Cummings | | October 9, 2020 |
| 2020 | Synchronic | Justin Benson & Aaron Moorhead | | October 23, 2020 |
| 2020 | What Lies Below | Braden R. Duemmler | | December 4, 2020 |
| 2020 | Audrey | Helena Coan | | December 15, 2020 |
| 2020 | Skylines | Liam O'Donnell | | December 18, 2020 |
| 2021 | The Block Island Sound | Kevin McManus & Matthew McManus | | March 11, 2021 |
| 2021 | Stowaway | Joe Penna | | April 22, 2021 |
| 2021 | The Paper Tigers | Tran Quoc Bao | | May 7, 2021 |
| 2021 | The Deep House | Julien Maury & Alexandre Bustillo | | June 30, 2021 |
| 2021 | Masquerade | Shane Dax Taylor | | July 30, 2021 |
| 2021 | No Man of God | Amber Sealey | Elijah Wood, Luke Kirby, Aleksa Palladino, & Robert Patrick | August 27, 2021 |
| 2021 | Yakuza Princess | Vicente Amorim | Masumi, Jonathan Rhys Meyers, Tsuyoshi Ihara, Eijiro Ozaki, & Kenny Leu | September 3, 2021 |
| 2021 | Prisoners of the Ghostland | Sion Sono | Nicolas Cage, Sofia Boutella, & Bill Moseley | September 17, 2021 |
| 2021 | The Trip | Tommy Wirkola | Aksel Hennie & Noomi Rapace | October 15, 2021 |
| 2021 | Night Raiders | Danis Goulet | | November 12, 2021 |
| 2022 | Dual | Riley Stearns | Karen Gillan, Aaron Paul, Theo James, & Beulah Koale | January 22, 2022 |
| 2022 | Gatlopp: Hell of a Game | Alberto Belli | | June 23, 2022 |
| 2022 | The Summoned | Mark Meir | | July 7, 2022 |
| 2022 | I Came By | Babak Anvari | George MacKay, Percelle Ascott, Kelly Macdonald, & Hugh Bonneville | August 31, 2022 |
| 2022 | Blackout | Sam Macaroni | Josh Duhamel, Abbie Cornish, Nick Nolte, & Omar Chaparro | October 12, 2022 |
| 2022 | Old Man | Lucky McKee | Stephen Lang & Marc Senter | October 14, 2022 |
| 2022 | Something in the Dirt | Justin Benson & Aaron Moorhead | Justin Benson & Aaron Moorhead | November 4, 2022 |
| 2022 | Nocebo | Lorcan Finnegan | Eva Green, Mark Strong, & Chai Fonacier | November 22, 2022 |
| 2022 | The Harbinger | Andy Mitton | Gabby Beans, Emily Davis, & Raymond Anthony Thomas | December 1, 2022 |
| 2022 | The Mean One | Steven LaMorte | Krystle Martin, Chase Mullins, John Bigham, Erik Baker, Flip Kobler, Amy Schumacher, & David Howard Thornton | December 9, 2022 |
| 2023 | Legions | Fabián Forte | Germán de Silva & Lorena Vega | January 19, 2023 |
| 2023 | The Resurrection of Charles Manson | Remy Grillo | | February 16, 2023 |
| 2023 | Huesera: The Bone Woman | Michelle Garza Cervera | Natalia Solián, Alfonso Dosal, Mayra Batalla, Mercedes Hernández, Sonia Couoh, & Aida López | February 23, 2023 |
| 2023 | BlackBerry | Matt Johnson | Jay Baruchel & Glenn Howerton | May 12, 2023 |
| 2023 | God Is a Bullet | Nick Cassavetes | Nikolaj Coster-Waldau, Maika Monroe, & Jamie Foxx | June 23, 2023 |
| 2023 | Run Rabbit Run | Daina Reid | Sarah Snook, Lily LaTorre, Damon Herriman, & Greta Scacchi | June 28, 2023 |
| 2023 | Hidden Strike | Scott Waugh | John Cena & Jackie Chan | July 29, 2023 |
| 2023 | My Animal | Jacqueline Castel | Bobbi Salvör Menuez, Amandla Stenberg, Heidi von Palleske, Cory Lipman, Charles F. Halpenny, Harrison W Halpenny, Joe Apollonio, Scott Thompson, Dean McDermott, & Stephen McHattie | September 8, 2023 |
| 2023 | Accused | Philip Barantini | Chaneil Kular, Lauryn Ajufo, Nitin Ganatra, Nila Aalia, Frances Tomelty, Robbie O'Neil, Jay Johnson, Ben Mars, Ollie Teague, Kimberley Marren | September 22, 2023 |
| 2023 | Share? | Ira Rosensweig | Melvin Gregg, Bradley Whitford, Danielle Campbell, & Alice Braga | November 3, 2023 |
| 2024 | Lovely, Dark, and Deep | Teresa Sutherland | Georgina Campbell, Nick Blood, & Wai Ching Ho | February 22, 2024 |
| 2024 | Code 8: Part II | Jeff Chan | Robbie & Stephen Amell | February 28, 2024 |
| 2024 | In Flames | Zarrar Kahn | Ramesha Nawal, Bakhtawar Mazhar, Adnan Shah Tipu, Mohammad Ali Hashmi, & Omar Javaid | April 12, 2024 |
| 2024 | Humane | Caitlin Cronenberg | Jay Baruchel, Emily Hampshire, Sebastian Chacon, Alanna Bale, Sirena Gulamgaus, Uni Park, Enrico Colantoni, & Peter Gallagher | April 26, 2024 |
| 2024 | New Life | John Rosman | Sonya Walger, Hayley Erin, & Tony Amendola | May 3, 2024 |
| 2024 | Krazy House | Steffen Haars & Flip van der Kuil | Nick Frost, Kevin Connolly, & Alicia Silverstone | May 16, 2024 |
| 2024 | Backspot | D. W. Waterson | Devery Jacobs, Kudakwashe Rutendo, & Evan Rachel Wood | May 31, 2024 |
| 2024 | Skywalkers: A Love Story | Jeff Zimbalist & Maria Bukhonina | Angela Nikolau & Vanya Beerkus | July 19, 2024 |
| 2024 | The Wasp | Guillem Morales | Naomie Harris & Natalie Dormer | August 30, 2024 |
| 2024 | Subservience | S.K. Dale | Michele Morrone & Megan Fox | September 13, 2024 |
| 2024 | Hounds Of War | Isaac Florentine | Frank Grillo, Robert Patrick, Rhona Mitra, Urs Rechn, Matthew Marsh, Seydina Baldé, Joey Ansah, & Yvonne Mai | September 20, 2024 |
| 2024 | Get Away | Steffen Haars | Nick Frost, Aisling Bea, Sebastian Croft, & Maisie Ayres | December 6, 2024 |
| 2025 | Seven Veils | Atom Egoyan | Amanda Seyfried, Rebecca Liddiard, Douglas Smith, Mark O'Brien, & Vinessa Antoine | March 7, 2025 |
| 2025 | Ash | Steven Ellison | Eiza González & Aaron Paul | March 21, 2025 |
| 2025 | Havoc | Gareth Evans | Tom Hardy, Xelia Mendes-Jones, Jessie Mei Li, Forest Whitaker, Timothy Olyphant, & Luis Guzmán | April 25, 2025 |
| 2025 | The Ritual | David Midell | Al Pacino, Dan Stevens, Ashley Greene, Abigail Cowen, & Patricia Heaton | June 6, 2025 |
| 2025 | Daniela Forever | Nacho Vigalondo | Henry Golding, Beatrice Granno & Ruben Ochandiano | July 11, 2025 |
| 2025 | Et Tu | Max Tzannes | Lou Diamond Phillips, Malcolm McDowell, Antwone Barnes, Isabella Blake-Thomas, Rachel Alig, Brennan Keel Cook, Jaclyn Mofid, Trevor James & Lanelle Scott | July 25, 2025 |
| 2025 | Osiris | William Kaufman | Max Martini, Brianna Hildebrand, LaMonica Garrett, Michael Irby, Linda Hamilton | July 25, 2025 |
| 2025 | Hallow Road | Babak Anvari | Rosamund Pike & Matthew Rhys | October 31, 2025 |
| 2025 | Vincent Must Die | Stéphan Castang | Karim Leklou & Vimala Pons | October 31, 2025 |
| 2025 | Man Finds Tape | Paul Gandersman & Peter Hall | Kelsey Pribilski & William Magnuson | December 5, 2025 |
| 2026 | In Cold Light | Maxime Giroux | Maika Monroe, Troy Kotsur & Helen Hunt | January 23, 2026 |
| 2026 | Nirvanna The Band The Show The Movie | Matt Johnson | Matt Johnson & Jay McCaroll | February 13, 2026 |
| 2026 | Redux Redux | Kevin McManus & Matthew McManus | Michaela McManus & Jim Cummings | February 20, 2026 |
| 2026 | Mile End Kicks | Chandler Levack | Barbie Ferreira, Devon Bostick & Jay Baruchel | April 17, 2026 |
| 2026 | Over Your Dead Body | Jorma Taccone | Jason Segel, Samara Weaving, Timothy Olyphant, Juliette Lewis, Paul Guilfoyle, & Keith Jardine | April 24, 2026 |
| 2026 | Saccharine | Natalie Erika James | Midori Francis, Danielle MacDonald & Madeleine Madden | May 22, 2026 |
| 2026 | The Furious | Kenji Tanigaki | Xie Miao, Joe Taslim, Jeeja Yanin, Yang Enyou, Yayan Ruhian, Brian Le, & Joey Iwanaga | June 12, 2026 |
Upcoming
| TBA | Skyline: Warpath | Liam O'Donnell | Iko Uwais, Scott Adkins, Louis Mandylor, Randall Bacon, & Yayan Ruhian | |
| TBA | Banquet | Galder Gaztelu-Urrutia | Meghann Fahy, Alfie Williams, Corey Mylchreest, Finbar Lynch, & Olwen Fouéré | |
| TBA | Egg Baby | Natalia Anderson | Ariana Greenblatt | |
| TBA | The Girlfriend | Natalie Morales | Meghann Fahy & Glenn Howerton | |
| TBA | Love Is the Monster | Alex Noyer | Madeline Zima, Kristina Tonteri-Young, Leonardo Nam, & Sheila McCarthy | |
| TBA | Flesh of the Gods | Panos Cosmatos | Kristen Stewart, Wagner Moura, Esmé Creed-Miles, Roland Møller, & Alba Baptista | |
| TBA | White Mars | Martin Owen & Lesley Manning | Lucy Hale, Luke Newton, Sam Hazeldine, & Sabrina Dhowre | |
