= Timo Tjahjanto =

Indonesian filmmaker

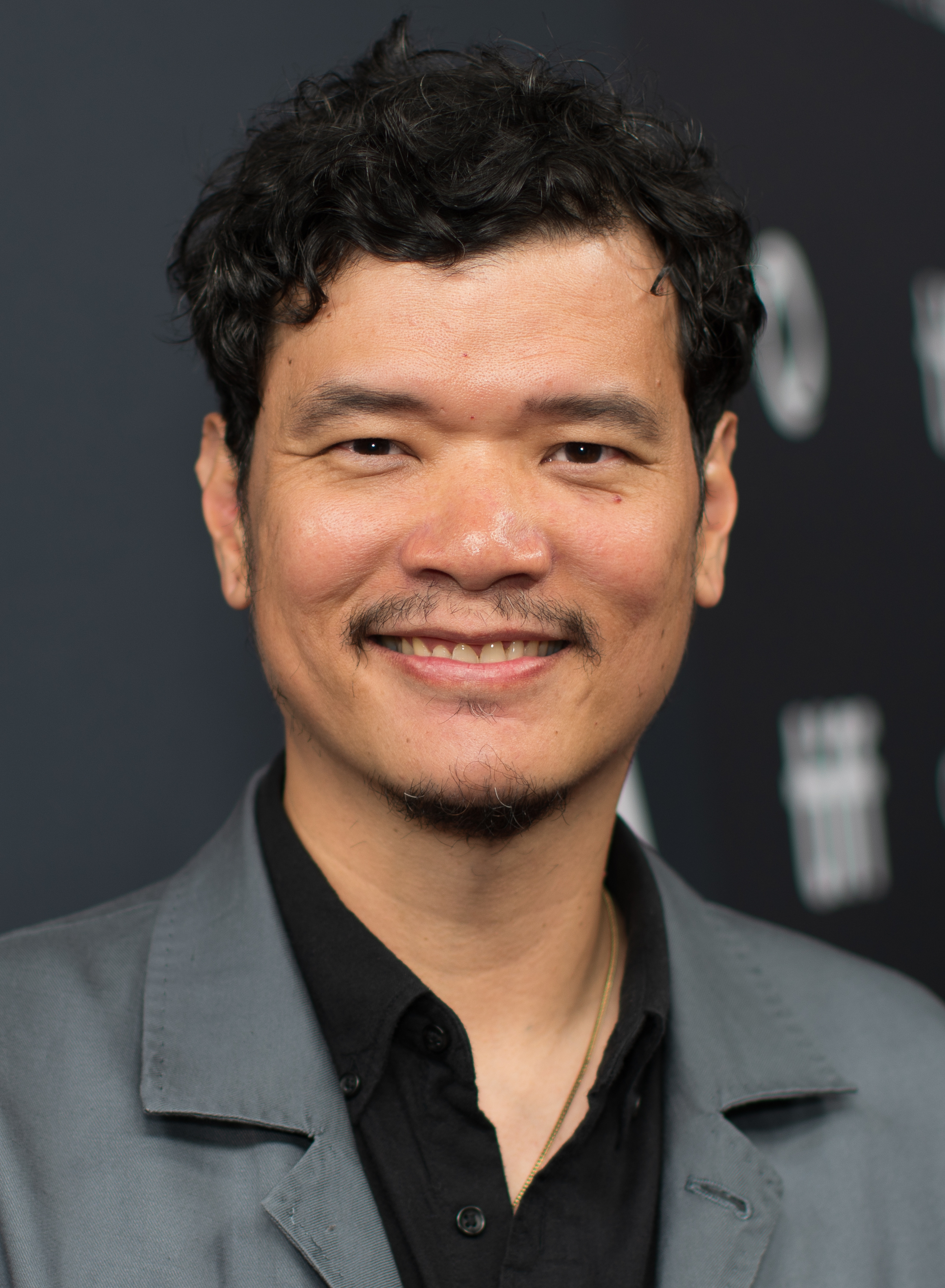
- Tjahjanto at the 2024 Toronto International Film Festival
- Born: Timothy Tjahjanto; 4 September 1980 (age 45); Wilhelmshaven, West Germany
- Citizenship: Indonesia
- Education: School of Visual Arts, Australia
- Occupations: Director; producer; writer
- Years active: 2007–present
- Spouse: Sigi Wimala (m. 2009; div. 2021)
- Children: 2
- Awards: Maya Award for Best Director (2018)

Timothy Tjahjanto (Indonesian: [tʃahˈjanto]; born 4 September 1980) is an Indonesian filmmaker known for his film works mostly on the horror and action genres. Tjahjanto owns the film production company Merah Production.

Apart from directing, producing, and writing story for his own films, Tjahjanto is also known as one half of The Mo Brothers with friend and fellow filmmaker Kimo Stamboel. The duo received a Citra Award nomination for Best Director in 2016 for Headshot while Tjahjanto himself won the Maya Award for Best Director in 2019 for May the Devil Take You.

== Early life ==
Timo received education at the School of Visual Arts in Australia, where he met future collaborator Kimo Stamboel. He began his career in the film industry as a freelance story board artist and photographer. He has cited Alfred Hitchcock's Psycho and Tommy Lee Wallace's 1990 adaptation of Stephen King's It as his major influences.

== Career ==
=== 2007–2017: Career beginnings, The Mo Brothers and Citra Award nominee ===
Tjahjanto and Stamboel rose to fame for directing and writing their feature directorial debut Macabre (known as Rumah Dara in local market) in 2009. The film is based on their 2007 short film Dara, which was included in the 2008 anthology film Takut: Faces of Fear. It stars Julie Estelle, Shareefa Daanish, Ario Bayu, Aming, and Sigi Wimala. Macabre received rave reviews and won several awards from international and local film festivals, with Daanish receiving praise for her performance as the titular character. Tjahjanto and Stamboel appeared among the patrons of Herosase in Joko Anwar's The Forbidden Door.

In 2012, he directed a segment in the anthology film The ABCs of Death alongside other filmmakers which included Nacho Vigalondo, Banjong Pisanthanakun, Ben Wheatley, Noboru Iguchi, Ti West, and Yoshihiro Nishimura. The following year, he worked on 'Safe Haven', a segment included in the horror anthology film V/H/S/2 which premiered at the 2013 Sundance Film Festival. Tjahjanto co-directed and co-wrote the segment with Gareth Evans, director of the 2011 action hit The Raid.

In 2014, Tjahjanto reunited with Stamboel as The Mo Brothers to direct, produce, and write Killers, a Japanese-Indonesian horror-thriller. The film stars actors from both Japan and Indonesia, including Kazuki Kitamura, Oka Antara, Rin Takanashi, Luna Maya, Ray Sahetapy, Epy Kusnandar, and Tara Basro. It premiered at the 2014 Sundance Film Festival and received positive reviews upon release with a 73% fresh score on Rotten Tomatoes. The duo teamed up again in 2016 to release the action film Headshot with The Raid star Iko Uwais and Maya Award winning actress Chelsea Islan in leading roles with Sunny Pang, Julie Estelle, Zack Lee, Bront Palarae, and Ario Bayu in supporting roles.

=== 2018–present: Solo works, further recognition, Maya Award ===
Taking a break from his works with Stamboel as The Mo Brothers, Tjahjanto explored the supernatural horror genre with May the Devil Take You in 2018. This marks his first feature film as a solo director. Released to positive reviews, the film saw him reunite with Chelsea Islan, Ray Sahetapy, and Shareefa Daanish. Later in the year, he released The Night Comes for Us based on a screenplay he wrote as an homage to Hong Kong 1980s cinema. The film is the first Netflix original production from Indonesia and received acclaim from critics with a 91% score on Rotten Tomatoes. The film stars top action stars Joe Taslim (Fast & Furious 6, Star Trek Beyond) and Iko Uwais whom he worked with previously in Headshot. In supporting roles, he cast actors that have become frequent collaborators, such as Julie Estelle, Zack Lee, Sunny Pang, Abimana Aryasatya, Hannah Al Rashid, Shareefa Daanish, and Epy Kusnandar. Citra Award winning actress Dian Sastrowardoyo also co-starred as an assassin tasked with hunting down the main character played by Taslim, marking her first venture in the action genre.

In February 2020, Tjahjanto released the sequel to May the Devil Take You, titled May the Devil Take You Too with Islan reprising her role as the main character. The film was released in theatres and later on Disney+ Hotstar in Indonesia with Shudder taking on the American distribution rights. It received mixed reviews from critics. The film earned Tjahjanto Best Director and Best Adapted Screenplay nominations at the 2020 Maya Awards.

=== Upcoming projects ===
In September 2018, Tjahjanto hinted on Twitter that he is working on adapting the action-thriller comic book JITU: Joint Tactical Intelligence Unit into a feature film. The project has not been officially confirmed despite Tjahjanto posting another teaser on Instagram in April 2019.

Tjahjanto has also confirmed that he has co-written a screenplay for a spin-off film focusing on Julie Estelle's character from The Night Comes for Us, titled Night of the Operator, with friend and collaborator Aaron Stewart-Ahn. While no official confirmation has been made, Tjahjanto and Stewart-Ahn teased a poster with Estelle's character in a red background on social media in January 2020.

In February 2020, Tjahjanto posted on his Twitter account hinting at a sequel to the Mo Brothers' 2009 hit Macabre. In a podcast with fellow Indonesian filmmaker Joko Anwar in April 2020, Tjahjanto shared that while the movie was a hit on the festival circuit, it was not as successful financially and that he and Stamboel will only do a sequel if they have a story that fits their ideals.

Following the release of May the Devil Take You Too, Tjahjanto announced in October 2020 that a follow-up, titled May the Devil Take You: Dajjal, is in pre-production with Islan and Daanish hinting that they will be reprising their respective roles in response to the announcement.

Tjahjanto was announced as director of a live-action adaptation of the Bumilangit Cinematic Universe film adaptation of comic book character Si Buta dari Gua Hantu in The Blind of the Phantom Cave: Angel's Eyes in 2018. Production was set to begin in early 2020, but was delayed due to the COVID-19 pandemic. Iko Uwais is rumored to star in the lead role as the titular character. It is part of the Bumilangit Cinematic Universe film for its Volume 1.

In February 2021, Tjahjanto was announced to helm a remake of South Korean blockbuster hit Train to Busan with James Wan producing for New Line Cinema. In November 2021, he was hired to direct the reboot of Under Siege for HBO Max. In February, it was announced that he will directing the sequel of The Beekeeper.

== Personal life ==
Tjahjanto was married to Citra Award nominated actress Sigi Wimala (who played a supporting role in his film Macabre) in an East Jakartan church in November 2009. They have two daughters. They quietly divorced in 2021.

== Filmography ==
=== With Kimo Stamboel (As The Mo Brothers) ===
Short film

Year	Title	Director	Writer	Producer	Editor	Notes
2007	Dara	Yes	Yes	Yes	Yes	Later included as a segment of the 2008 anthology Takut: Faces of Fear

Feature film

Year	Title	Director	Writer	Producer
2009	Macabre	Yes	Yes	Yes
2014	Killers	Yes	Yes	Yes
2016	Headshot	Yes	Yes	No

=== Solo works ===
Short film

Year	Title	Director	Writer	Editor	Notes
2012	L is for Libido	Yes	Yes	Yes	Segment of The ABCs of Death
2014	Safe Haven	Yes	Yes	No	Segment of V/H/S/2; Co-directed with Gareth Evans
2019	Sarah	Yes	Yes	No	Segment of Portals
2021	The Subject	Yes	Yes	No	Segment of V/H/S/94

Feature film

Year	Title	Director	Writer	Producer
2018	May the Devil Take You	Yes	Yes	No
2018	The Night Comes for Us	Yes	Yes	Yes
2020	May the Devil Take You Too	Yes	Yes	Yes
2022	Perempuan Bergaun Merah	No	No	Yes
2022	The Big 4	Yes	Yes	Yes
2024	The Shadow Strays	Yes	Yes	Yes
2025	Nobody 2	Yes	No	No
2027	The Beekeeper 2	Yes	No	No
TBA	Sleeping Dogs	Yes	No	No

Executive producer

- Hit & Run (2019)

== Awards and nominations ==
Year	Award	Category	Work	Result	Notes
2007	Freak Show Horror Film Festival	Audience Choice Award	Dara	Won	as The Mo Brothers
2007	New York City Horror Film Festival	Audience Award	Dara	Won	as The Mo Brothers
2009	Bucheon International Fantastic Film Festival	Best of Bucheon	Macabre	Nominated	as The Mo Brothers
2010	Jakarta International Film Festival	Best Indonesian Film	Macabre	Won	as The Mo Brothers
2011	KasKus untuk Film Indonesia	Best Film	Macabre	Won	as The Mo Brothers
2012	Chicago International Film Festival	Gold Hugo	The ABCs of Death	Nominated	shared with other directors in the anthology
2013	Molins Film Festival	Jury Prize	V/H/S/2	Nominated	shared with other directors in the anthology
2013	SXSW Film Festival	Audience Award	V/H/S/2	Nominated	shared with other directors in the anthology
2013	Sitges Film Festival	Grand Prize of European Fantasy Film in Silver	V/H/S/2	Nominated	shared with other directors in the anthology
2016	Fantaspoa International Fantastic Film Festival	Honorable Mention for International Film	Killers	Won	as The Mo Brothers
2016	L'Étrange Festival	International Feature Film	Headshot	Won	as The Mo Brothers shared with They Call Me Jeeg
2016	36th Citra Awards	Best Director	Headshot	Nominated	as The Mo Brothers
2018	Sitges Film Festival	Midnight X-Treme Award	May the Devil Take You	Won	
2019	8th Maya Awards	Best Director	May the Devil Take You	Won	
2019	8th Maya Awards	Indonesian Film in International Platform	The Night Comes for Us	Won	Special Mention
2020	9th Maya Awards	Best Feature Film	May the Devil Take You Too	Nominated	
2020	9th Maya Awards	Best Director	May the Devil Take You Too	Nominated	
2020	9th Maya Awards	Best Adapted Screenplay	May the Devil Take You Too	Nominated	
2023	43rd Citra Awards	Best Director	The Big 4	Nominated	
