= The Mo Brothers =

Indonesian filmmakers

- Occupations: Director; producer; writer
- Years active: 2007–present

The Mo Brothers is an Indonesian filmmaking duo consisting of directors, producers, and screenwriters Timo Tjahjanto and Kimo Stamboel. They have mostly worked on the action, thriller, and horror genres. They first became known for directing the short film Dara in 2007, which became the basis of their 2009 feature film debut Macabre (Rumah Dara). Together, they have received a Citra Award Best Director nomination in 2016 for directing the action film Headshot, after which Tjahjanto and Stamboel have gone on to make movies individually to further critical and commercial success.

== Career ==
Tjahjanto and Stamboel met while both were students in Australia. Stamboel began directing his feature film debut Bunian in Sydney with the entire cast and crew consisting of people who had no experience in filmmaking, including Tjahjanto who was a freelance cameraman.

They worked together as co-directors for the first time in the 2007 short film Dara, which was later included in the 2008 anthology film Takut: Faces of Fear. The short film's success led to the duo working on their 2009 breakout hit Macabre in 2009, receiving praise during its run at several film festivals and launched The Mo Brothers' name into mainstream recognition. They then directed, produced, and wrote the horror-thriller Killers which premiered at the 2014 Sundance Film Festival to positive reviews. They followed up with the 2016 action film Headshot which stars Iko Uwais and Chelsea Islan. For their work on Headshot, The Mo Brothers were nominated for Best Director at the 2016 Citra Award but lost to Riri Riza (Athirah).

After Headshot, Tjahjanto and Stamboel have since released feature films individually while still collaborating in different capacities, such as when Stamboel co-produced Tjahjanto's 2018 Netflix original film The Night Comes for Us.

== Filmography ==
Year	Film					
Year	Film	Director	Writer	Producer	Editor	Notes
2007	Dara	Yes	Yes	Yes	Yes	Short film
2008	Takut: Faces of Fear	Yes	Yes	Yes	Yes	Segment: "Dara"
2009	Macabre	Yes	Yes	Yes	No	
2014	Killers	Yes	Yes	Yes	No	
2016	Headshot	Yes	Yes	No	No	

== Awards and nominations ==
Year	Award	Category	Work	Result	Notes
2007	Freak Show Horror Film Festival	Audience Choice Award	Dara	Won	
2007	New York City Horror Film Festival	Audience Award	Dara	Won	
2009	Bucheon International Fantastic Film Festival	Best of Bucheon	Macabre	Nominated	
2010	Jakarta International Film Festival	Best Indonesian Film	Macabre	Won	
2011	KasKus untuk Film Indonesia	Best Film	Macabre	Won	
2016	Fantaspoa International Fantastic Film Festival	Best Bloodbath Honorable Mention	Killers	Won	International Film Competition
2016	L'Étrange Festival	International Feature Film	Headshot	Won	Shared with They Call Me Jeeg
2016	36th Citra Award	Best Director	Headshot	Nominated	
