= Macabre (2009 film) =

2009 Indonesian slasher film

- Promotional Poster
- Rumah Dara
- Directed by: The Mo Brothers
- Written by: The Mo Brothers
- Produced by: Delon Tio; Freddie Yeo; Gary Goh; Greg Chew; James Toh; The Mo Brothers
- Starring: Julie Estelle; Shareefa Daanish; Ario Bayu; Sigi Wimala; Imelda Therinne; Arifin Putra
- Cinematography: Roni Arnold
- Edited by: Herman Panca
- Music by: Yudhi Arfani; Zeke Khaseli
- Production companies: Gorylah Pictures; Merah Production; Guerillas Visuals; Nation Pictures; Mediacorp Raintree Pictures
- Distributed by: Golden Village Pictures (Singapore); The Collective Studios (US); Five Star Entertainment; Overlook Entertainment (Worldwide)
- Release dates: July 2009 (Bucheon International Fantastic Film Festival); October 2009 (Singapore); January 2010 (Indonesia)
- Running time: 95 minutes
- Countries: Indonesia; Singapore
- Languages: Indonesian; Dutch
- Box office: $190,363

Macabre (also known as Rumah Dara or Dara) is a 2009 Indonesian slasher film by The Mo Brothers. The film tells the story of a group of friends headed to the airport who meet a woman claiming to have been robbed and needs a ride home, which begins a dark turn of events. The film is based on 2007 short film Dara.

== Plot ==
Married couple Adjie and Astrid, are on the way to the airport, accompanied by their friends: Alam, Eko, Jimmy, and Adjie's estranged sister Ladya. On the way they picked up beautiful woman named Maya who claims to have been robbed, and decide to give her a ride home.

The group arrives at a secluded house, where they meet Maya's family: her mother Dara, brothers Adam and Arman. At the Dara's insistence, the group agrees to stay for dinner. Adjie takes Astrid, who is pregnant, upstairs to rest. During dinner, the group fall unconscious because of the drugged food. Arman drags them to a cellar one by one.

Alam wakes up alone at the dinner table. After unsuccessfully trying to seduce him, Maya slashes him and Adam breaks his arm. Seeing the attack, Adjie and Astrid flee upstairs, but Adam breaks Adjie's leg. Astrid locks herself in the guest room. Dara tells her that the drug she was given will cause her to go into labor. Astrid sees a car arriving at the house and calls for help from the window. However, it is just Dara's customer, who receives several coolers containing meat. Dara's family are cannibals, who belong to a secret society attempting to gain immortality from it.

Astrid's water breaks, and she gives birth on her own. Astrid gets out of the room with her newborn son and embraces her husband. Dara sneaks in and takes the baby. She tells the couple they either escape by themselves or try to take the infant back and die. In a daze, Astrid follows Dara as Adjie looks for help.

Ladya, Eko and Jimmy wake up in the cellar, finding themselves bound. Arman kills and dismembers Alam with a chainsaw, putting the usable parts into a cooler, while scraping the rest into a trash bag. He prepares to kill Ladya, but Eko and Jimmy taunts and distracts him, allowing her to break free of her restraints. She knocks him out and sets Eko and Jimmy free.

The three attempt to save the married couple, but Maya chases them off with a crossbow. While Adam catches up with them and kills Jimmy, Ladya goes back to the house. Eko finds a road, where another car approaches him.

Back in the house, Adjie enters a room filled with baby cadavers and sees one baby being preserved. He then finds Astrid dead, having been stabbed in the neck with a hairpin. Dara overpowers him and strangles him into unconsciousness. Arman captures Ladya and prepares to rape her.

Eko is taken back to the house in the car, which turns out to be a police patrol car. Dara claims nothing is amiss, but the four police officers take a look around the house. One of them find photographs of the three siblings dated 1912, and a photo of Dara dated 1889. Upstairs, Ladya stabs Arman in the eye and escapes while Arman screams, alerting the officers. Adam turns off the lights, and the family of cannibals attack and kill most of the officers. One managed to fatally wound Maya with an assault rifle. Dara kills him before mercy-killing Maya.

After slashing the throat of a policeman, Arman dies from blood loss. Adam attacks Ladya and Adjie, before being stabbed by Eko, then set on fire and decapitated by Ladya and Adjie. Dara attacks Eko with a chainsaw.

Ladya and Adjie flee with Adjie's baby and find Eko's body. Dara attack them and greviously wounds Adjie. Ladya shoots her with one of the officers' guns and strangles her with her necklace. Adjie reconciles with Ladya and asks her to care of her nephew (his newborn son) before succumbing to his injuries.

As Ladya and the baby leave in the officers' car, Dara reappears. Ladya hit Dara with the car, slamming her against a large tree. After she drives off, Dara's bloody hand twitches.

== Cast ==
- Shareefa Daanish as Dara
- Julie Estelle as Ladya
- Ario Bayu as Adjie
- Sigi Wimala as Astrid
- Imelda Therinne as Maya
- Arifin Putra as Adam
- Daniel Mananta as Jimmy
- Mike Lucock as Alam
- Dendy Subangil as Eko
- Ruli Lubis as Arman
- Aming as Mecia

== Production ==
In 2007, Timo Tjahjanto and Kimo Stamboel wrote and directed Dara, their first work as the directing duo The Mo Brothers, which originated the characters featured in Macabre as well as the basic concept used to develop the film's screenplay. Tjahjanto and Stamboel had met a few years prior on the set of Stamboel's directorial debut Bunian in 2004 where Tjahjanto worked as a freelance cameraman.

Julie Estelle at first refused to star in the film, but became interested once she read the script. She increased her weight by 4 kilograms (8.8 lb) and underwent a fitness regime to prepare for the role.

== Release ==
The film premiered at the 2009 Bucheon International Fantastic Film Festival, then known as PiFan, in July, followed by a theatrical release in Singapore on October 8, 2009. It struggled to gain attraction in its home country of Indonesia and only received a theatrical release the following year on January 22, 2010, titled Rumah Dara.

Following its festival run in 2009, the film's distribution rights for North America and Europe were picked up by the Paris-based Overlook Entertainment. In 2013, the film was released on VOD platforms as part of the Bloody Disgusting Selects line.

== Reception ==
=== Box office ===
In Indonesia, the film performed poorly during its theatrical run. In 2020, Timo Tjahjanto commented that while the film received positive reviews and has since gained a cult following, it did not perform well financially. Overall, it grossed $190,363.

=== Critical response ===
The film received positive reviews from critics. Anton Bitel of Little White Lies praised the film for "its realist opening" that leads to "multiple orgasm[s] of a horror climax that just keeps delivering again and again and again." Following the film's screening at the 2009 Sitges Film Festival, Shelagh Rowan-Legg of That Shelf wrote that "the directors crank up the tension at just the right pace to keep the adrenaline pumping." Maggie Lee of The Hollywood Reporter also gave the film a positive review, writing that it "is a splatter film that spills buckets of blood as it doles out ladles of tongue-in-cheek, genre-savvy fun."

Derek Elley of Variety wrote that the film "starts leisurely but delivers in the final reels, thanks to some real shocks amid the ankle-deep blood and an eerie perf by Indonesian actress Shareefa Daanish." Ken W. Hanley, a reviewer for Diabolique, called it "a bizarre, bloody masterpiece of madness."

In a less enthusiastic review, Panos Kotzathanasis of Asian Movie Pulse called the film "a genuine exploitation/splatter/slasher film solely addressing fans of the genre" while noting that it "do[es] a great job in all of its aspects."

== Awards and nominations ==
Year	Award	Category	Recipient	Result
2009	Bucheon International Fantastic Film Festival	Best of Bucheon	The Mo Brothers	Nominated
2009	Bucheon International Fantastic Film Festival	Best Actress	Shareefa Daanish	Won
2010	Bandung Film Festival	Best Actress	Shareefa Daanish	Nominated
2010	Jakarta International Film Festival	Best Indonesian Film	Macabre	Won
2011	KasKus untuk Film Indonesia	Best Film	Macabre	Won
2011	KasKus untuk Film Indonesia	Best Actress	Shareefa Daanish	Nominated

== Sequel ==
In February 2020, Timo Tjahjanto posted on his Twitter account hinting at a sequel to Macabre. In a podcast with fellow Indonesian filmmaker Joko Anwar in April 2020, Tjahjanto shared that while the movie was a hit on the festival circuit, it was not as successful financially and that he and Stamboel will only do a sequel if they have a story that fits their ideals.
