= Dara (film) =

2007 Indonesian slasher short film

- Dara
- Directed by: The Mo Brothers
- Written by: The Mo Brothers
- Produced by: The Mo Brothers
- Starring: Shareefa Daanish; Mike Lucock
- Cinematography: Roni Arnold
- Edited by: Herman Panca
- Music by: Fajar Yuskemal; Ulung Tanoto
- Distributed by: Merah Production
- Release date: 19 October 2007 (Screamfest Horror Film Festival)
- Running time: 22 Minutes
- Country: Indonesia
- Language: Indonesian
- Budget: Rp 220 million

Dara is a 2007 Indonesian slasher short film written and directed by Kimo Stamboel and Timo Tjahjanto as The Mo Brothers. The film gave Stamboel and Tjahjanto the necessary exposure to direct their first feature film Macabre which is based on and features the principal cast and characters of Dara.

== Plot ==
The film begins at restaurant which is owned by a beautiful and perfect woman named Dara. That night, Dara invites a man named Adjie to dine with her on the next night in her house. Then, after black fades, Adjie is shown again, bounded by chains in a blood-splattered room. He tries to break free, but Dara, comes to the room and test the quality of Adjie, as her test, she bites Adjie's stomach. Attempting to kill Adjie, Dara starts to slash him off with her chainsaw. Suddenly, a bell rings and, Dara, with her chainsaw broken, leaves the room and opens the door.

It was a bald-headed man named Eko, wanting to meet Dara. Eko is welcomed to the dinner table to eat, while Dara leaves him for a second, goes to a room and dumps Eko's flower bouquet onto a bed in there. She crosses Eko's name in the next day's date, and writes Adjie's name on the current date. From this activity, we know that Dara is a cannibal who invites men secretly and kills them when they are in her house. And Dara schedules her victims each night, for one reason: to have fresh meat every day. And the men who come to her house now, will be slashed like Dara's past victims.

At dinner, after Dara shuts Adjie's mouth and turns on classical music loudly, Dara is visited by a quiet, fat man named Rama who joins Dara and Eko for dinner. The conversation in there is dominated by Eko who tells Rama about exercising for a six pack. While they are at the dinner table, Adjie manages to break the chain and set himself free from the room. Realizing that Adjie is loose, Dara takes her crossbow (placed secretly under the dinner table) and shoots Eko's chest, then slits his throat with a machete. Then, she slashes Rama's shoulder and when Rama crawls to the front door, he is decapitated by Dara with the same machete as a slash on his shoulder.

Adjie returns to the gory room and hides there from Dara. Dara, who finds Adjie, gets stabbed in the hand by Adjie. Then Adjie quickly runs to front door, opens it, and goes into his car. When he wants to close his car door, Dara with her chainsaw turned on breaks it and slaughters Adjie with it, leaving no survivor that night.

The scene changes to Dara's restaurant, where she takes some meat from her refrigerator, and it is revealed that the meat used for her meals, are human meat. Then the camera pans through the restaurant as everybody looks appreciatively at the food cooked by Dara herself. Dara who still won over the men' fights yet, smiles and makes a grimace to camera.

== Cast ==
- Shareefa Daanish as Dara
- Mike Lucock as Adjie
- Dendy Subangil as Eko
- Ruli Lubis as Rama

== Release ==
The film premiered at the Screamfest Horror Film Festival on October 19, 2007. It was subsequently featured in the 2008 anthology horror film Takut: Faces of Fear.

== Awards and nominations ==
Year	Award	Category	Work	Result
2007	Freak Show Horror Film Festival	Audience Choice Award	Dara	Won
2007	New York City Horror Film Festival	Audience Award	Dara	Won

== Feature film adaptation ==
A feature film adaptation of Dara was released in 2009 titled Macabre (also known as Rumah Dara) with both Tjahjanto and Stamboel directing as The Mo Brothers. The film stars Shareefa Daanish as the titular character as well as the rest of the short film's cast with character adjustment and features several new performers, including Julie Estelle, Sigi Wimala, Arifin Putra, and Imelda Therinne.
