= Broken hearts (disambiguation) =

"Broken heart" is a common metaphor for the intense emotional pain or suffering one feels after losing a loved one.

Broken Hearts may also refer to:

- Broken Hearts, an 1875 blank verse play by W. S. Gilbert
- "Broken Hearts" (Arrow), a 2016 television episode
- "Broken Hearts" (Homeland), a 2012 television episode
- Broken Hearts, 1926 American film directed by Maurice Schwartz
- Broken Hearts (film), a 2012 Indonesian film
- "Broken Hearts" (song), a 2018 song by Chevel Shepherd
- Broken Hearts, UK female DJ duo of Amber Butchart and Nisha Stevens
- "Broken Hearts", a song by Living Colour from the 1988 album Vivid
