= Stuber (film) =

2019 film directed by Michael Dowse

- Theatrical release poster
- Directed by: Michael Dowse
- Written by: Tripper Clancy
- Produced by: Jonathan Goldstein; John Francis Daley
- Starring: Dave Bautista; Kumail Nanjiani; Iko Uwais; Natalie Morales; Betty Gilpin; Jimmy Tatro; Mira Sorvino; Karen Gillan
- Cinematography: Bobby Shore
- Edited by: Jonathan Schwartz
- Music by: Joseph Trapanese
- Production company: GoldDay Productions
- Distributed by: 20th Century Fox
- Release dates: March 13, 2019 (SXSW); July 12, 2019 (United States)
- Running time: 93 minutes
- Country: United States
- Language: English
- Budget: $18 million
- Box office: $32.3 million

Stuber is a 2019 American buddy cop action comedy film directed by Michael Dowse and written by Tripper Clancy. Its plot follows a mild-mannered Uber driver named Stu (Kumail Nanjiani) who picks up a passenger (Dave Bautista) who turns out to be a cop hot on the trail of a brutal killer. Iko Uwais, Natalie Morales, Betty Gilpin, Jimmy Tatro, Mira Sorvino, and Karen Gillan also star.

The film had its world premiere at South by Southwest on March 13, 2019, and was theatrically released in the United States by 20th Century Fox on July 12, 2019. The film received mixed reviews from critics and grossed $32.3 million against an $18 million budget.

== Plot ==
Vic Manning, an aggressive Los Angeles Police Department detective, is in pursuit of notorious drug lord Oka Tedjo, who six months earlier murdered Vic's partner, Sara Morris, after which Vic's superior, Captain McHenry, places him on leave. Because his pursuit of Tedjo during that encounter was hampered when his glasses were knocked off his face, Vic undergoes corrective laser eye surgery. This requires him to remain off duty for an additional day or two, due to his reduced vision as his eyes heal. However, when an informant contacts him with a lead on Tedjo's current whereabouts, he calls for an Uber and is picked up by Stu Prasad, an unassuming driver who diligently performs his job with an eye on the reviews he receives on the Uber app.

Vic's investigation leads him and a reluctant Stu around Los Angeles. Along the way, Stu deals with both Vic's violent and reckless behavior and his own feelings for a woman named Becca, a close friend and business partner with whom he plans to open a spin biking business. Becca, having broken up with her boyfriend, wants Stu to come over for casual sex, but Stu has been genuinely in love with her from the moment he met her and wants a more serious relationship. As Stu and Vic get to know one another, they confront each other about Stu's lack of courage with Becca, while Stu criticizes Vic for his toxic masculinity and his insensitive treatment of his daughter Nicole, a sculptor.

At a house in Long Beach, Vic detains Amo, a key suspect of his investigation, and rescues a Pit Bull Terrier named Pico after it was fed packets of drugs. After Stu accidentally shoots Amo in the leg, Vic leads them to an animal hospital, where both Amo and Pico receive medical attention from the vet. After Vic learns from Amo that Tedjo will be making a drug drop later that night, they are ambushed by a group of Tedjo's men, who taunt Vic about his daughter's art exhibition that same evening. With Stu's help, Vic dispatches the thugs and races to Nicole's exhibition to warn her about the potential danger, but she is fed up with her father's obsession with hunting down Tedjo. Afterwards, Stu drops off Vic near the drop location and calls Becca, admits his feelings for her, and then tells her they cannot be friends anymore since he knows she does not feel the same way. At the drop Vic calls for backup but Stu notices only a lone police car heading his way.

As he waits for Tedjo, McHenry arrives, and Vic finds out that she is a dirty cop who has been working with Tedjo and was planning to frame Vic for murder to get him off their trail. However, before she can kill Vic, Stu runs her over and the two unsuccessfully attempt to escape from Tedjo in his car. As they struggle against him, Nicole arrives after tracking down Stu by his Uber app and is nearly shot by Tedjo. Stu jumps in front of her and takes the bullet, and Vic almost kills Tedjo before Nicole stops him. The police arrive to bring Tedjo to justice.

As Stu and Vic recover in the hospital, Vic gives Stu a five-star Uber review (despite the $5,534.95 fare he has to pay him). By Christmas Becca has opened a successful spin biking business and Vic, who arrives at Nicole's home with Pico, discovers that Nicole is dating Stu.

== Cast ==
- Kumail Nanjiani as Stu Prasad, an Uber driver.
- Dave Bautista as Detective Victor "Vic" Manning, Nicole's father, Sara's partner, and a grizzled LAPD detective.
- Iko Uwais as Oka Tedjo, a ruthless drug trafficker and cop killer.
- Natalie Morales as Nicole Manning, Vic's daughter.
- Betty Gilpin as Becca, Stu's best friend and love interest.
- Jimmy Tatro as Richie Sandusky
- Mira Sorvino as Captain Angie McHenry, Vic's boss.
- Karen Gillan as Detective Sara Morris, Vic's late partner.
- Steve Howey as Felix
- Amin Joseph as Leon
- Scott Lawrence as Dr. Branch
- Aaron Sheridan as Dr. Vans
- Rene Moran as Amo Cortez
- Julia Vasi as Sloane
- Melody Peng as Brooke
- Victoria Anastasi as Melanie
- Malachi Malik as Tariq
- Patricia French as Grandma Doris
- Jay D. Kacho as Detective Kramer
- Amber Chardae Robinson as Amber
- PLK's TMT Casanova Stroker as Pico the Dog

== Production ==
In April 2016, 20th Century Fox bought the spec script Stuber from Tripper Clancy for a mid-six figure deal, with Jonathan Goldstein and John Francis Daley set to produce the film.

In December 2017, Dave Bautista was cast as a "detective who commandeers an unsuspecting Uber driver named Stu" while Michael Dowse was announced as the director of the film. In March 2018, Kumail Nanjiani signed on to costar with Bautista. In April 2018, Iko Uwais joined the cast. In May 2018, Betty Gilpin, Natalie Morales, Mira Sorvino, Steve Howey, and Amin Joseph joined the cast.

Principal photography commenced on May 3, 2018, in Atlanta, Georgia and was shot until July 2, 2018.

== Release ==
Stuber had its world premiere at South by Southwest on March 13, 2019 and was released on July 12, 2019. Following their acquisition of 20th Century Fox, which closed a week after the film's premiere, the film was Walt Disney Studios' first film to receive an R-rating by the Motion Picture Association since The Fifth Estate (2013).

=== Home media ===
Stuber was released on Digital HD on October 1, 2019, and was released on DVD, Blu-ray, and 4K Ultra HD on October 15, 2019.

== Reception ==
=== Box office ===
Stuber has grossed $22.3 million in the United States and Canada, and $9.8 million in other territories, for a worldwide total of $32.2 million.

In the United States and Canada, the film was projected to gross $7–15 million from 3,050 theaters in its opening weekend. The film made $3.1 million on its first day, including $750,000 from Thursday night previews. It went on to debut to $8 million, finishing fourth at the box office. In its second weekend the film made $4.1 million, dropping 50% and finishing sixth.

=== Critical response ===
On Rotten Tomatoes, Stuber has an approval rating of 43% based on 229 reviews, with an average rating of 5.1/10. The website's critical consensus reads, "Though it makes a strong case for future collaborations between Kumail Nanjiani and Dave Bautista, Stuber fails to mesh its contrasting genres, settling for an overtly violent, mildly entertaining diversion that's far from a five-star ride." On Metacritic, the film has a weighted average score of 42 out of 100, based on 37 critics, indicating "mixed or average reviews". Audiences polled by CinemaScore gave the film an average grade of "B" on an A+ to F scale, while those at PostTrak gave it an average 3.5 out of 5 stars and a 51% "definite recommend".

Peter Debruge of Variety gave the film a positive review and wrote: "It's both funny and familiar to see these two incredibly different personalities thrust together for what's meant to be a short ride."

Glenn Kenny, writing for RogerEbert.com, said "The only thing worse than hot garbage is elaborately lukewarm mediocrity, and for too much of its running time, the new comedy Stuber is just that." Simon Thompson of IGN wrote: "Stuber is an awkward, uneven action-comedy that never realizes its full potential. It squanders a good premise and an odd couple pairing with potential that could have delivered something special." A. A. Dowd of The A.V. Club gave the film a grade C−, calling it "a big waste of talent".
