= Legions (film) =

2022 Argentine supernatural horror film

- Promotional release poster
- Directed by: Fabián Forte
- Written by: Fabián Forte
- Starring: Germán de Silva; Lorena Vega; Ezequiel Rodríguez; Mariana Anghileri; María Laura Cali; Demián Salomón; Mauro Altschuler; Marta Haller; Fernando Alcaraz
- Cinematography: Mariano Suárez
- Edited by: Mariana Quiroga
- Music by: Pablo Fuu
- Production companies: Coruya Cine; MonteCine
- Release dates: 5 January 2022 (Porto Alegre); 30 April 2022 (Fantaspoa)
- Running time: 88 minutes
- Country: Argentina
- Language: Spanish

Legions (Spanish: Legiones), also known as Cosa e' Mandinga, is a 2022 Argentine supernatural horror film written and directed by Fabián Forte. It stars Germán de Silva as Antonio Poyju, a powerful sorcerer who must escape from a psychiatric hospital and find his daughter Helena (played by Lorena Vega)—who has forgotten her magical powers—in order to counter demonic forces wreaking havoc across Argentina.

Legions was filmed in Buenos Aires and Misiones Province, Argentina. It premiered in Porto Alegre, Brazil, on 5 January 2022, and screened at several film festivals throughout the year, including the Fantaspoa Festival, Sitges Film Festival and the Fantasia International Film Festival. The film was released by XYZ Films in North America on video-on-demand (VOD) on 19 January 2023.

== Cast ==
- Germán de Silva as Antonio Poyju
- Lorena Vega as Helena Poyju
- Ezequiel Rodríguez
- Mariana "Moro" Anghileri
- María Laura Cali
- Demián Salomón
- Mauro Altschuler
- Marta Haller
- Fernando Alcaraz

== Production ==
Writer-director Fabián Forte wrote the initial screenplay for Legions in late 2015; various rewrites followed over the next few years, partly due to budgetary restrictions. Financing for the film was provided by the National Institute of Cinema and Audiovisual Arts (INCAA) and the Instituto de Artes Audiovisuales de Misiones (IAAVIM), with Coruya Cine serving as the production company.

Filming began in late 2019 in Buenos Aires. Mariano Suarez and Laura Aguerrebehere served as director of photography and art director, respectively. Flashback sequences shot in Misiones Province were originally scheduled to be filmed in April 2020, but the production was postponed as a result of the COVID-19 pandemic, prompting the filmmakers to begin reviewing and editing the existing materials and conduct further rewrites. In June 2020, the film was reported as being in post-production.

Additional filming took place in Misiones in December 2020. Executive producer Yamila Barnasthpol described the crew as being composed primarily of misionero (Note: The demonym for people from Misiones Province.) technicians; Barnasthpol stated that, while Suarez and Aguerrebehere returned to maintain an aesthetic consistent with that which was shot before the production halted, the remainder of the crew—including the members of the sound, art, costume, makeup, and lighting departments—were Misiones-based.

== Release ==
An official trailer for Legions was uploaded to YouTube in June 2020.

Legions premiered at the Casa de Cultura Mario Quintana (CCMQ) in Porto Alegre, Brazil, on 5 January 2022. On 30 April 2022, the film screened at the Capitol Cinematheque as part of the 18th Fantaspoa Festival, with Forte in attendance as a speaker. The film was also shown at the Sitges Film Festival in Spain and the Fantasia International Film Festival in Canada, with the later screening taking place on 24 July 2022.

In July 2022, the film's international sales rights were acquired by FilmSharks, and its North American distribution rights acquired by XYZ Films. XYZ Films was released Legions in North America on video-on-demand (VOD) on 19 January 2023.

== Reception ==
=== Critical response ===
Martin Pazos of TN commended the film for its balance of humor and horror, as well as the performances of de Silva and Vega. He noted the film as exhibiting a mix of influences, with Pazos specifically citing The Day of the Beast, One Flew Over the Cuckoo's Nest and, in particular, The Evil Dead.

=== Accolades ===
Year	Award	Category	Recipient	Result	Ref(s)
2022	Fantaspoa Film Festival	Best Script	Fabián Forte	Won	
