= The Beekeeper (2024 film) =

Action thriller film by David Ayer

- Theatrical release poster
- Directed by: David Ayer
- Written by: Kurt Wimmer
- Produced by: Bill Block; Jason Statham; David Ayer; Chris Long; Kurt Wimmer
- Starring: Jason Statham; Emmy Raver-Lampman; Josh Hutcherson; Bobby Naderi; Minnie Driver; Phylicia Rashad; Jeremy Irons
- Cinematography: Gabriel Beristain
- Edited by: Geoffrey O'Brien
- Music by: David Sardy; Jared Michael Fry
- Production companies: Miramax; Cedar Park Entertainment; Punch Palace Productions
- Distributed by: Metro-Goldwyn-Mayer (through Amazon MGM Studios; United States); Sky Cinema (through StudioCanal; United Kingdom)
- Release date: January 12, 2024
- Running time: 105 minutes
- Countries: United States; United Kingdom
- Language: English
- Budget: $40 million
- Box office: $162.6 million

The Beekeeper is a 2024 action thriller film produced and directed by David Ayer and written by Kurt Wimmer. It stars Jason Statham, Emmy Raver-Lampman, Josh Hutcherson, Bobby Naderi, Minnie Driver, Phylicia Rashad, and Jeremy Irons. The film follows a retired government assassin who sets out for revenge after his kind-hearted landlady falls victim to a phishing scam.

The Beekeeper was released in the United States by Amazon MGM Studios and in the United Kingdom by Sky Cinema on January 12, 2024. The film received generally positive reviews from critics and grossed $162.6 million worldwide against a budget of $40 million. A sequel, The Beekeeper 2, is scheduled for a theatrical release on January 15, 2027.

== Plot ==
In Springfield, Massachusetts, retired school teacher Eloise Parker lives alone but shares a warm friendship with Adam Clay, a quiet beekeeper who rents space in her barn. One day, Eloise falls for a phishing scam that steals her life savings, including over $2 million from a charity she runs; devastated and bankrupt, she kills herself. Adam discovers her body, and FBI agent Verona Parker, Eloise's daughter, arrests him on suspicion of murdering her. Adam is cleared and released, and Verona apologizes. Hellbent on revenge, he contacts a mysterious group called the "Beekeepers" for information to locate those responsible. They trace the scammers to a call center near Springfield, run by Mickey Garnett.

Adam storms the call center and burns it down, killing guards in the process. Mickey's boss, Derek Danforth, instructs Mickey to kill Adam, but he takes down the assailants and severs Mickey's fingers with a bandsaw. Mickey calls Derek to warn him, but Adam kills Mickey, and warns Derek that he is next. Derek alerts Wallace Westwyld, a former CIA director serving as head of security for Danforth Enterprises, Derek's tech firm. Recognizing Adam as a former Beekeeper, Wallace alerts the CIA, who dispatches Anisette, a current Beekeeper, to kill him. Anisette ambushes Adam, but he kills her and cuts off one of her fingers; the Beekeepers promptly declare neutrality, leaving Wallace with no defenses. Adam uses Anisette's severed finger to enter her compound and search for Derek's primary call center.

Verona and her partner, Matt Wiley, anticipate that Adam's next target is the Nine Star United Center in Boston, which oversees Derek's global scam call centers. Wallace rallies a black ops team led by Pettis and briefs them on the Beekeepers, revealed to be an elite clandestine human intelligence organization tasked with protecting the United States and operating above and beyond governmental jurisdiction, with an organizational culture inspired by worker bees in a beehive. Pettis's team deploys to secure Nine Star and kill Adam, but tensions with an FBI SWAT team and manager Rico Anzalone's refusal to evacuate create confusion that allows Adam to incapacitate the SWAT team, kill Pettis and his men, and interrogate Anzalone.

Verona and Wiley learn Derek is the son of Jessica Danforth, the incumbent president of the United States, and warn FBI deputy director Jackson Prigg that Adam may attempt to kill her for Derek's misdeeds. Wallace sends Derek to Jessica at their coastal mansion, which is protected by anti-Beekeeper mercenaries led by Lazarus, who has a prosthetic leg after an encounter with a Beekeeper. Adam infiltrates the mansion during a party and fights his way through the building, neutralizing the Secret Service Counter Assault Team and killing Lazarus and his men.

Meanwhile, Jessica and Prigg confront Derek, who admits Wallace gave him CIA algorithms, which he used to feed data to his criminal scam empire and to rig Jessica's election. When Jessica threatens to reveal his crimes to the public, an enraged Derek shoots Prigg and prepares to kill his mother, but Adam shoots Derek in the head before he can. Verona holds Adam at gunpoint, but ultimately lets him go. Adam flees to the beach, where he dons his buried diving gear and disappears into the sea.

== Cast ==
- Jason Statham as Adam Clay, a highly skilled assassin known as a Beekeeper who has retired to live a quiet life
- Emmy Raver-Lampman as Verona Parker, Eloise's daughter, an FBI agent
- Josh Hutcherson as Derek Danforth, a tech bro who is the CEO of Danforth Enterprises and the leader of an international scamming ring
- Bobby Naderi as Matt Wiley, an FBI agent and Verona's partner
- Minnie Driver as Janet Harward, the CIA director
- Jemma Redgrave as Jessica Danforth, President of the United States and Derek's mother
- Phylicia Rashad as Eloise Parker, a retired school teacher and Adam's close friend
- Jeremy Irons as Wallace Westwyld, the former CIA director, now head of security for Danforth Enterprises
- David Witts as Mickey Garnett, the manager of the call center that scammed Eloise
- Michael Epp as Pettis, leader of the tactical team hired to protect the Nine Star United Center
- Taylor James as Lazarus, a South African mercenary experienced in killing Beekeepers who leads the Danforths' mercenary guards
- Enzo Cilenti as Rico Anzalone, the manager of the Nine Star United Center
- Don Gilet as Jackson Prigg, the deputy director of the FBI
- Megan Le as Anisette Landress, a psychotic amateur Beekeeper tasked with killing Adam

== Production ==
In August 2021, it was announced that Jason Statham would star in the film for Miramax and would also serve as a producer through his company Punch Palace Productions. David Ayer signed on to direct in May 2022.

Principal photography ran in England from September to December 2022. Locations included Tyringham Hall and the Kingsferry Bridge. In preparation for the film's opening scenes, Statham learned several methods of beekeeping and interacted with real bees.

== Release ==
MGM acquired the film's distribution rights in the United States in August 2022. In February 2023, Sky Cinema acquired the rights in the United Kingdom, with StudioCanal handling the U.K. theatrical release on behalf of Sky Cinema. It was released by Amazon MGM Studios on January 12, 2024.

The Beekeeper was released on VOD and digital platforms on January 30, 2024, followed by a release on DVD, Blu-ray and Ultra HD Blu-ray on April 23, 2024.

== Reception ==
=== Box office ===
The Beekeeper grossed $66.2 million in the United States and Canada, and $96.4 million in other territories, for a worldwide total of $162.6 million, against a budget of "$40 million or less".

In the United States and Canada, The Beekeeper was released alongside Mean Girls and The Book of Clarence, and was projected to gross $17–19 million from 3,303 theatres in its opening weekend. It made $6.7 million on its first day, including $2.4 million from Thursday night previews. It went on to debut to $16.6 million, finishing second behind Mean Girls. The film made $8.5 million in its second weekend and $6.7 million in its third weekend, remaining in second at the box office. It spent its first eight weeks in the Top 10 at the domestic box office.

=== Critical response ===
On the review aggregator website Rotten Tomatoes, 71% of 182 critics' reviews are positive, with an average rating of 5.9/10. The website's consensus reads: "Cheerfully undemanding and enjoyably retrograde, The Beekeeper proves that when it comes to dispensing action-thriller justice, Statham hasn't lost his sting." Metacritic, which uses a weighted average, assigned the film a score of 53 out of 100, based on 36 critics, indicating "mixed or average" reviews. Audiences polled by CinemaScore gave an average grade of "B+" on an A+ to F scale.

A review in The Guardian says the non-shooting scenes are rushed and both Rashad and Driver are underused, and describes it as "a solid, low-stakes, medium-reward new year's effort". Matt Zoller Seitz of RogerEbert praised the film's various aspects, including its range of villains, but regretted: "It's a real shame that The Beekeeper isn't the righteous trash masterpiece that it keeps threatening to turn into." John Nugent of Empire magazine said that Statham is "as gruffly convincing as he usually is (though it's 20 minutes before he's even allowed to kick any ass)" but called the action scenes "horribly inconsistent" and noted that "you do have to put up with quite a lot of stuff about bees".

== Sequel ==
In February 2025, it was announced that a sequel to The Beekeeper was in development, with Timo Tjahjanto directing, and Kurt Wimmer writing the screenplay. Jason Statham would reprise his role as Adam Clay, as well as produce on the film. In May 2025, Kurt Wimmer was replaced by Umair Aleem for the screenplay. In September, Jeremy Irons announced he would reprise his role as Wallace Westwyld. Emmy Raver-Lampman, Bobby Naderi, Jemma Redgrave, Yara Shahidi, Pom Klementieff and Adam Copeland joined the cast later that month. In January 2026, the film was scheduled for a theatrical release in the United States on January 15, 2027.
