= The Beekeeper 2 =

- Theatrical release poster
- Directed by: Timo Tjahjanto
- Screenplay by: Kurt Wimmer; Zak Penn
- Story by: Kurt Wimmer
- Based on: Characters by Kurt Wimmer
- Produced by: Jason Statham; Chris Long; Kurt Wimmer
- Starring: Jason Statham; Pom Klementieff; Emmy Raver-Lampman; Yara Shahidi; Bobby Naderi; Adam Copeland; Jemma Redgrave; Jeremy Irons
- Cinematography: Callan Green
- Edited by: Dana E. Glauberman
- Music by: Christopher Benstead
- Production companies: Metro-Goldwyn-Mayer; Miramax; Punch Palace Productions; Long Shot Productions
- Distributed by: Amazon MGM Studios
- Release dates: January 15, 2027 (United States and United Kingdom)
- Running time: 117 minutes
- Countries: United States; United Kingdom
- Language: English

The Beekeeper 2 is an upcoming action thriller film directed by Timo Tjahjanto and written by Kurt Wimmer and Zak Penn. It serves as the sequel to The Beekeeper (2024), with Jason Statham, Emmy Raver-Lampman, Bobby Naderi, Jemma Redgrave, and Jeremy Irons reprising their roles, and Yara Shahidi, Pom Klementieff and Adam Copeland joining.

The Beekeeper 2 is scheduled to be released theatrically in the United States and United Kingdom on January 15, 2027, by Amazon MGM Studios.

== Premise ==
Adam Clay becomes a wanted man when he has to save the President of the United States from his own organization, the Beekeepers, who have gone rogue.

== Cast ==
- Jason Statham as Adam Clay, a highly skilled assassin known as The Beekeeper
- Emmy Raver-Lampman as Verona Parker, an FBI agent
- Bobby Naderi as Matt Wiley, an FBI agent and Verona's partner
- Jemma Redgrave as Jessica Danforth, President of the United States
- Jeremy Irons as Wallace Westwyld, the former CIA Director now head of security for Danforth Enterprises
- Yara Shahidi
- Pom Klementieff as a member of the Beekeepers
- Adam Copeland

== Production ==
In February 2025, it was announced that a sequel to The Beekeeper was in development, with Timo Tjahjanto directing, and Kurt Wimmer writing the screenplay. Jason Statham would reprise his role as Adam Clay, as well as producing on the film. In May 2025, Wimmer was replaced by Umair Aleem for writing the screenplay. In September, it was announced Jeremy Irons would reprise his role as Wallace Westwyld. Emmy Raver-Lampman, Bobby Naderi, Jemma Redgrave, Yara Shahidi, Pom Klementieff and Adam Copeland joined the cast later that month. In July 2026, the Writers Guild of America published the final writing credits, with Wimmer sharing "Screenplay By" credit with Zak Penn and receiving a "Story By" credit, and Aleem receiving an off-screen "Additional Literary Material" credit.

=== Filming ===
Principal photography began on September 26, 2025, with production occurring at Shepperton Studios. Callan Green serves as the cinematographer, marking his second collaboration with Tjahjanto after Nobody 2. On November 29, Tjahjanto announced via Instagram that filming for the movie had wrapped.

== Release ==
The Beekeeper 2 is scheduled to be released worldwide on January 15, 2027, by Amazon MGM Studios.

In May 2025, it was confirmed that Amazon MGM Studios would return as the distributor to the sequel, acquiring worldwide rights for over $50 million. In November 2025, it was announced that Black Bear Pictures would handle sales on the film at the American Film Market for the Middle East, North Africa and Asia, with Amazon MGM retaining all other rights.
