= Headshot (2016 film) =

2016 Indonesian action film

- Headshot poster
- Directed by: The Mo Brothers
- Written by: Timo Tjahjanto
- Produced by: Shinjiro Nishimura; Wicky V. Olindo; Mike Wiluan
- Starring: Iko Uwais; Chelsea Islan; Sunny Pang; Julie Estelle; Very Tri Yulisman; David Hendrawan; Zack Lee
- Cinematography: Yunus Pasolang
- Edited by: Arifin Cu'unk
- Music by: Aria Prayogi; Fajar Yuskemal
- Production companies: Infinite Frameworks Studios; Screenplay Infinite Films; XYZ Films
- Distributed by: Surya Citra Media
- Release dates: September 9, 2016 (Toronto); December 8, 2016 (Indonesia)
- Running time: 118 minutes
- Country: Indonesia
- Languages: Indonesian; English
- Box office: $2 million

Headshot is a 2016 Indonesian action thriller film directed by the Mo Brothers and written by Timo Tjahjanto. The film stars Iko Uwais and Chelsea Islan, alongside Sunny Pang, Julie Estelle, David Hendrawan, Zack Lee, Very Tri Yulisman, Bront Palarae and Yayu Unru. The film revolves around a man with amnesia (Uwais), who sets out to protect the doctor who saved his life (Islan) from a crime syndicate and also uncover his past.

Headshot premiered on September 9, 2016 at the Toronto International Film Festival and theatrically on December 8, 2016 in Indonesia. It received generally positive reviews from critics with praise for its cast performances (particularly Uwais and Islan), direction and action sequences.

== Plot ==
A comatose man of unknown identity and origin is being cared by Dr. Ailin in a rural hospital on a small island. The man eventually wakes up after two months with no clear memory of how he was injured or even his identity. He adopts the name Ishmael from Moby-Dick, which Ailin is reading. The man learns that he was found on the beach by a man named Romli.

Meanwhile, a mobster named Lee and his henchmen Rika and Besi violently eliminate a rival gang. One of the gang's survivors tells Lee about Ishmael and Lee sends the man to investigate. Ishmael and the thug have a brief altercation after the man threatens Ailin. Ailin travels to the mainland to seek better care for Ishmael, but her bus is stopped by Lee's men, who are looking for Ishmael (whom they call Abdi). They slaughter all the passengers except Ailin and a young girl, whom they abduct. Called by Ailin, Ishmael and Romli hurry to the scene of the bus attack. Ishmael kills a few of Lee's thugs, but Romli is also killed. An Interpol agent tells Ishmael about children abducted by Lee's syndicate and bred to be devoted smugglers and criminal enforcers; Ishmael was one of those children.

The agent is killed when a group of Lee's assassins attack the police station in an attempt to take out Ishmael/Abdi. Ishmael puts down the attackers instead and escapes. Ishmael must then go to war with the syndicate to save Ailin. While traveling, Ishmael encounters Besi near a well, and it is revealed that he, Besi and Rika trained together. Lee would put children in the well and starve them for a few days and the child, who killed all the others to get the food would be freed. Ishmael tries to persuade Besi to not be on Lee's side, but Besi refuses out of loyalty. They then begin to fight and Ishmael manages to gain the upper hand, killing Besi with a strong hit to the head. After Besi dies, Rika discovers his corpse and attacks Ishmael on the beach.

Ishmael eventually defeats Rika despite receiving multiple wounds from the latter, and it is revealed that Rika was the one who shot Ishmael and gave him amnesia in the first place. Rika takes advantage of the distraction and holds Ishmael at gunpoint, but she can't bring herself to shoot Ishmael again, where she instead shoots away from him, wasting her bullets. In the confusion, Ishmael accidentally mortally injures Rika by reflexively throwing a knife. After comforting Rika in her dying moments, Ishmael finds Lee's hideout, where he and Ailin meet each other during the chaos, with Ailin initially hostile to Ishmael due to their relationship resulting in her kidnapping. Ishmael manages to convince her and they mutually embrace.

However, Lee arrives and gets enraged that Ishmael killed both Besi and Rika, whom he had considered as his "favorite children". They then enter a brutal fight, with Lee gaining the upper hand due to his strength. However, Ishmael finally beats Lee outside, and impales him on the sharp branch of a tree trunk. In a last-ditch effort, Lee attempts to kill Ishmael by impaling him on the same sharp tree trunk, but Ailin saves Ishmael. Lee finally succumbs to his wounds and dies. Ailin is recovering in the hospital, with Ishmael wounded severely. However, Ishmael wakes up with Ailin by his side and Ailin smiles, hinting at a possible rekindling between them.

== Cast ==
- Iko Uwais as Ishmael/Abdi
- Chelsea Islan as Dr. Ailin
- Sunny Pang as Lee
- Julie Estelle as Rika
- David Hendrawan as Tejo
- Zack Lee as Tano
- Very Tri Yulisman as Besi
- Bront Palarae as Interpol Agent Ali
- Yayu Unru as Romli
- Ario Bayu as Jakarta Police Captain
- Hirooki Goto as Japanese Thug (cameo)

== Production ==
Headshot was directed by Timo Tjahjanto and Kimo Stamboel, known as The Mo Brothers, who had never directed an action film before. Timo wrote the storyline in two and a half weeks and claimed that "it may be the fastest story I've ever produced." The film was produced by Screenplay Infinite Films. Besides starring in the film, Iko Uwais also led the choreography team for three weeks. In the film, every character has their own fighting style, such as silat, wushu, or brutal fighting, based on the background of the actor.

== Soundtrack ==
A soundtrack album was released by the production house and featured Andre Harihandoyo dan Sonic People who contributed the song "Impostor Heart".

== Release ==
Headshot was first screened at the 2016 Toronto International Film Festival on 9 September 2016. The film was screened twice on 24 & 29 September in Fantastic Fest, Austin. On 4 October, the film was screened at Beyond Fest in Los Angeles. It was also screened at Mayhem Film Festival 2016 on October 13. It was also screened at the 30th Leeds International Film Festival on 13–14 November.

In Indonesia, Headshot was premiered on 19 November 2016 in Bandung and 20 November in Makassar. The film was released into theaters on 8 December.

== Reception ==
Headshot received generally positive reviews. As of June 2020, the film holds a 72% approval rating on Rotten Tomatoes, based on 47 reviews with an average rating of 6.23 out of 10. On Metacritic, it has an aggregated score of 61 out of 100, meaning "generally favorable reviews".

Dennis Harvey of Variety wrote that "In terms of sheer, punchy physical vigor, Headshot is a knockout." Headshot received 4 out of 5 stars from The Guardian, where Wendy Ide called it "the most insanely violent film of the year" and wrote that "Thrilling fight scenes and dizzyingly relentless action elevate this Indonesian adventure to headspinning heights". Simon Abrams of RogerEbert.com gave Headshot 2.5 stars out of 4 and wrote that "Blood-soaked Indonesian martial arts flick Headshot is for anyone who liked The Bourne Identity, but wished it were way more violent."

Some reviewers considered the film repetitive, excessive, or both. David Ehrlich of IndieWire wrote that the film is a "brutally exhausting bloodbath", saying that "As the movie stretches deep into its second hour, it's easy to start resenting the fact that everybody gets shot with 20 bullets when one would do." Collider's Matt Goldberg gave the movie "D", criticizing that "a movie that should have been a lean actioner instead runs almost two hours even though it's just a damsel-in-distress story... Eventually, fight fatigue sets in and we know that the directors aren't going to do anything to surprise us."

== Awards and nominations ==
Year	Award	Category	Recipient	Result	Notes
2016	Citra Awards	Best Director	The Mo Brothers	Nominated	
2016	Citra Awards	Best Sound	Aria Prayogi; Fajar Yuskemal; M. Ichsan Rachmaditta	Won	
2016	Citra Awards	Best Art Direction	Iqbal Marjono	Nominated	
2016	Citra Awards	Best Visual Effects	Andi Novianto	Won	
2016	L'Étrange Festival	International Feature Film	Headshot	Won	shared with They Call Me Jeeg
2017	Maya Awards	Best Sound	Aria Prayogi; Fajar Yuskemal; Ichsan Rachmaditta	Nominated	
2017	Maya Awards	Best Visual Effects	Andi Novianto	Nominated	
2017	Maya Awards	Best Makeup & Hairstyling	Kumalasari Tanara	Nominated	
2017	Golden Trailer Awards	Best Foreign Action Trailer	Vertical Entertainment; Zealot Pictures	Nominated	
