= Broken Hearts (film) =

- Film poster
- Directed by: Helfi Kardit
- Screenplay by: Helfi Kardit
- Produced by: Chand Parvez Servia, Fiaz Servia
- Starring: Julie Estelle; Reza Rahadian; Darius Sinathrya; Meriam Bellina; Axel Andaviar; Melly Goeslaw; Anto Hoed
- Cinematography: Joel Fadly Zola
- Edited by: Cesa David Luckmansyah
- Music by: Melly Goeslaw; Anto Hoed
- Production company: Starvision Plus
- Distributed by: Starvision Plus; Hotstar Originals
- Release date: May 15, 2012
- Running time: 92 minutes
- Country: Indonesia
- Language: Indonesian

Broken Hearts is a 2012 Indonesian film written and directed by Helfi Kardit, and stars Julie Estelle and Reza Rahadian.

== Plot ==
When Olivia's (Julie Estelle) boyfriend, Jamie (Reza Rahadian), disappears without any warning, Olivia's life becomes cold and empty. For Olivia, Jamie will always be her first and last love and when he leaves, her trust in men is destroyed, believing that all guys are liars and thieves that steal the hearts of women. With her broken heart, Olivia has a hard time trusting anyone, even when she meets Aryo (Darius Sinathrya), a friend of Jamie. Aryo, asked to comforting Olivia by Jamie, becomes closer and closer to Olivia.

Jamie who asked Aryo to replace him with Olivia, as he has suffered complications with anorexia nervosa. Because of the rarity of cases in young men, Jamie requires constant medical attention and has a short prognosis. As Aryo and Olivia fall deeper in love, Jamie, watching, begins to experience jealousy and doubts. What will Jamie do? Will Aryo give up Olivia for his friendship with Jamie?

== Cast ==
- Julie Estelle as Olivia
- Reza Rahadian as Jamie
- Darius Sinathrya as Aryo
- Meriam Bellina
- Axel Andaviar
- Melly Goeslaw
- Anto Hoed

== Production ==
The scenario was first worked on by Helfi Kardit in 2002 and originally titled Ikhlas. Darius Sinathrya was contacted to star in this film two weeks before the shooting because the previous actor who was supposed to play Aryo could not play it because of scheduling clashes. Reza Rahadian reduced his weight by 15 kilograms (33 lb) for this film. Melly Goeslaw and Anto Hoed were the music directors of this film. "Broken Hearts", one of the songs of the film's soundtrack, is a duet between Rahadian and Acha Septriasa, and Rahadian directed its music video.

== Reception ==
According to Detik.com, "the whole mood was mobilized to drain the audience's tears", even though the film does not give any explanation for anorexia. Puput Puji Lestari from Kapanlagi.com considered this film to be Helfi Kardit's best work.
