= French School Jakarta =

Location
- Jl. Cipete Dalam N°32 Jakarta 12410 Indonésie; Indonesia
- Coordinates: 6.2763°S 106.8010°E

Information
- Type: French international school
- Opened: 1967
- Age: 3 to 18
- Website: https://frenchschooljakarta.com

French School Jakarta (FSJ) a.k.a. Lycée français de Jakarta, formerly known as the Lycée Français Louis-Charles Damais and the Lycée international français de Jakarta (LIF Jakarta), and LIFE School Jakarta, is a French international school in Jakarta, Indonesia.

It serves levels preschool (maternelle) through high school (lycée).

== History ==
French school Jakarta was founded in 1967 to serve the educational needs of the French and Francophone community in Indonesia. The school's establishment was initiated by expatriate parents and supported by the Compagnie Industrielle de Travaux (CITRA), a subsidiary of the Schneider Group, which was constructing infrastructure for Jakarta's Tanjung Priok port at the time.

The institution has operated under several names throughout its history:

Petite École Française de Jakarta (1967)

École Saint-Exupéry

French Consular School (1975)

École Internationale Française (EIF) (1982)

Lycée International Français de Jakarta (LIF) (1993)

Lycée Français de Jakarta (2014)

LIFE School Jakarta (2021)

French School Jakarta (2024)

The most recent name change was inaugurated in 2024 in the presence of French Ambassador to Indonesia, Fabien Penone.

== Administration and Accreditation ==
FJS is accredited by the French Ministry of National Education, ensuring compliance with French National Curriculum standards. Since 1990, the school has maintained an agreement with the Agency for French Education Abroad (AEFE), which oversees a global network of French schools.

== Student Body and Curriculum ==
As of the 2023-2024 school year, the school enrolled over 470 students aged 2 to 18, representing 45 nationalities. Instruction is conducted primarily in French and English, with additional language courses offered in Spanish, German, Mandarin, and Indonesian.
