= Julie Estelle =

Indonesian actress and model (born 1989)

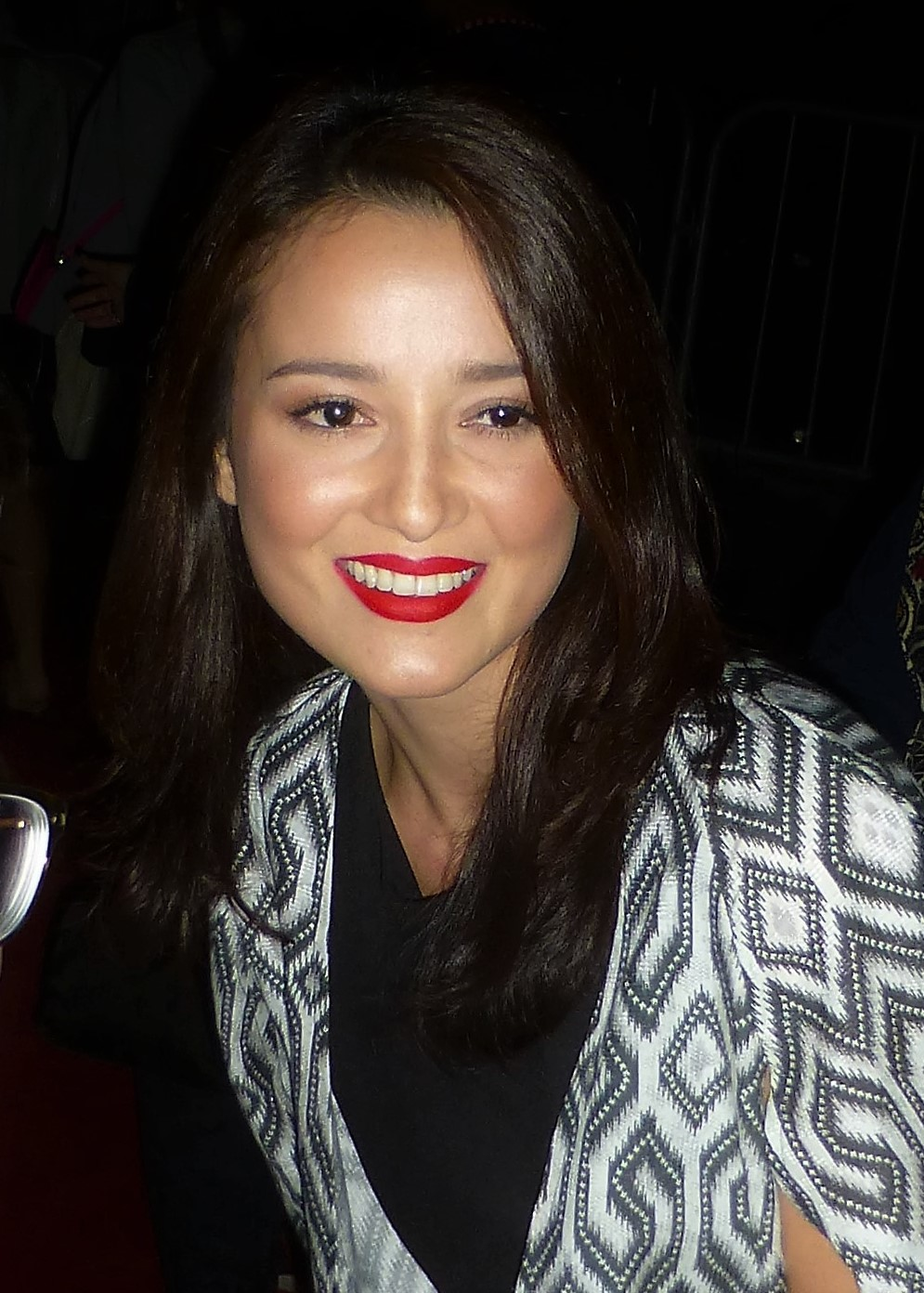
- Julie Estelle at the 2016 Toronto Film Festival
- Born: Julie Estelle Gasnier; January 4, 1989 (age 37); Jakarta, Indonesia
- Education: Lycee International Francais de Jakarta (2007)
- Occupations: Actress; Model
- Years active: 1998 - present
- Agents: ICM Partners; Avatara 88
- Height: 170 cm (5 ft 7 in)
- Spouse: David Tjiptobiantoro (m. 2021)
- Children: 1

Julie Estelle Gasnier (born January 4, 1989), better known as Julie Estelle, is an Indonesian actress and model. She is best known internationally for her roles in slasher and martial arts films, such as Ladya in Macabre (2009), Hammer Girl in The Raid 2 (2014), and The Operator in The Night Comes for Us (2018). She won Best New Actress at the 2015 Jackie Chan Action Movie Awards.

== Early life and education ==
Julie Estelle was born on 4 January 1989, in Jakarta, Indonesia, to an Indonesian mother and French-American father. Estelle graduated from Lycee International Francais de Jakarta majoring in business.

== Career ==
Julie Estelle debuted at 15 years old in the 2005 romance film Alexandria, taking on the role of a 20-year-old college senior. For her acting in this film, Estelle won the 2006 MTV Indonesia Awards "Most Favorite Rising Star". In 2006, Estelle starred in a blockbuster horror film Kuntilanak (The Chanting) and its two spin-offs in 2007 and 2008, respectively. She was featured on the cover of Playboy Magazine's Indonesian edition for July 2006 issue, right after she turned 17.

In 2010, Julie Estelle dipped into her first action film genre in The Mo Brothers' mega blockbuster slasher film Macabre. The following years, Julie Estelle played in numerous local TV series and movies. At 20 years old, Julie Estelle was the seventh-highest paid actress in Indonesia. In addition to her modelling career, she also appeared in several music videos.

In 2012, she joined Gareth Evans' action film The Raid 2. She was cast as Hammer Girl, a merciless assassin who uses claw hammers as her signature weapon and is proficient in Silat Harimau. Evans was impressed with her audition and cast her despite her lack of martial arts background. For the role of Hammer Girl, Julie Estelle learned pencak silat from Yayan Ruhian, the co-choreographer of the film.

In 2014, Julie Estelle attended Sundance Film Festival for The Raid 2's world premiere. Justin Chang of Variety wrote that her character "feel straight out of the Tarantino playbook, particularly in a climactic endgame whose red-walled production design seems to be channeling Only God Forgives."

For her performance in The Raid 2, Julie Estelle received the Best New Actress award at Jackie Chan Action Movie Awards at The 2015 Shanghai International Film Festival.

In 2016, Julie Estelle reunited with Iko Uwais and Mo Brothers of Macabre for the action thriller Headshot. The same year, Julie Estelle starred in the drama Letters from Prague as a woman trying to fulfill her deceased mother's last wish. The film was selected as the Indonesian entry for the Best Foreign Language Film at the 89th Academy Awards.

Julie Estelle played The Operator in Timo Tjahjanto's 2018 action film The Night Comes for Us. The film premiered at Fantastic Fest on 22 September 2018, and was distributed by Netflix. Kieran Fisher of Film School Rejects wrote, "Her role was that of a background player, but she certainly made a memorable impression and further proved that she could get mix it up with the best of them", and "The actress boasts such a commanding screen presence and effortlessly compelling aura that she could become a household name in the West if she picks the right roles."

In November 2018, Julie Estelle joined ICM Partners as her representative agency in the U.S. The following month, she was cast to play the leader of rebels in an American-Indonesian joint production action film Foxtrot Six. The film was released in late February 2019. The Jakarta Post praised her performance in the film, "She is the best performer of the film as she rarely comes off as awkward even when delivering the film’s forced dialog and her character also being the most interesting."

== Personal life ==
Julie Estelle is the second daughter out of three sisters. Her elder sister, Catherine Sharon Gasnier, is a TV host and actress.

On 25 February 2021, Julie Estelle married a racer, David Tjiptobiantoro, in the Maldives.

== Filmography ==
=== Film ===
| Year | Title | Role | Notes | Ref. |
|---|---|---|---|---|
| 1998 | Daun di Atas Bantal | Little girl | Cameo | |
| 2005 | Alexandria | Alexandria Jasmina | | |
| 2005 | Dealova | Amanda | | |
| 2006 | Kuntilanak | Samantha | | |
| 2007 | Kuntilanak 2 | Samantha | | |
| 2007 | Selamanya | Aristha | | |
| 2008 | Kuntilanak 3 | Samantha | | |
| 2009 | Macabre | Ladya | | |
| 2010 | Aku atau Dia | Novie | | |
| 2011 | Cowok Bikin Pusing | Cecile | | |
| 2012 | Brokenhearts | Olivia | | |
| 2014 | The Raid 2 | Alicia / "Hammer Girl" | | |
| 2015 | Filosofi Kopi | El | | |
| 2015 | City of Blood | Tun | | |
| 2016 | Headshot | Rika | | |
| 2016 | Letters from Prague | Laras | | |
| 2016 | Firegate | Arni Kumalasari | | |
| 2018 | The Night Comes for Us | The Operator | | |
| 2018 | Milly & Mamet | Alexandra | | |
| 2019 | Lagi Lagi Ateng | Cemplon | | |
| 2019 | Foxtrot Six | Sari Nirmala | | |
| 2023 | Falling In Love Like In Movies | Herself / Hana | | |

=== Television series ===
| Year | Title | Role | Notes | Ref. |
|---|---|---|---|---|
| 2007 | Teenage Mutant Ninja Turtles Animation | April O'Neil (voice over) | Indonesian version | |
| 2008 | Melamar Peramal | | | |
| 2010 | Amanah dalam Cinta | | 54 episodes | |
| 2011 | Kasih dan Cinta | | 25 episodes | |
| 2012 | Dewi Penjaga Rindu | | | |
| 2013 | Aprilio dan Julie | Julie | 39 episodes | |
| 2015 | The East | Claudia, herself | Supporting role and guest star | |

=== Music video appearances ===
| Year | Title | Artist/Band | Ref. |
|---|---|---|---|
| 2007 | "Ketahuan" | Matta Band | |
| 2007 | "Akal Sehat" | ADA Band | |
| 2007 | "Cobalah Mengerti" | Peterpan | |
| 2008 | "Takkan Ada Aku Lagi" | Ello | |
| 2009 | "Hafizah" | Sembilan Band | |
| 2011 | "Bidadari" | William Gomez | |
| 2013 | "Letoy" | Blackout | |

== Awards and nominations ==
| Year | Award | Category | Nominated work | Result | Ref. |
|---|---|---|---|---|---|
| 2006 | MTV Indonesia Movie Awards | Most Favorite Rising Star | Alexandria | Nominated | |
| 2007 | Jakarta Film Festival | Best Actress | Selamanya | Nominated | |
| 2014 | Yahoo! Celebrity Awards | Most Stylish Actress | —N/a | Nominated | |
| 2014 | Indonesian Choice Awards | Actress of the Year | —N/a | Nominated | |
| 2014 | Maya Awards | Arifin C Noer Award for Brief Appearance | The Raid 2 | Nominated | |
| 2015 | Jackie Chan Action Movie Awards | Best New Actress | The Raid 2 | Won | |
| 2015 | i-Cinema Awards | Most Favorite Female Actress | Filosofi Kopi | Nominated | |
| 2016 | Indonesian Movie Awards | Most Favorite Female Actress | Letters from Prague | Won | |
| 2016 | Indonesian Movie Awards | Best Actress | Letters from Prague | Nominated | |
| 2016 | Indonesian Movie Awards | Best Chemistry (with Tio Pakusadewo) | Letters from Prague | Nominated | |
