= The Night Comes for Us =

2018 Indonesian film by Timo Tjahjanto

- Promotional release poster
- Malam Datang untuk Kita
- Directed by: Timo Tjahjanto
- Written by: Timo Tjahjanto
- Produced by: Todd Brown; Nick Spicer; Kimo Stamboel; Timo Tjahjanto; Sukhdev Singh; Mike Wiluan; Wicky V. Olindo
- Starring: Joe Taslim; Iko Uwais; Julie Estelle; Sunny Pang; Zack Lee
- Cinematography: Gunnar Nimpuno
- Edited by: Arifin Cuunk
- Music by: Fajar Yuskemal; Aria Prayogi
- Production companies: XYZ Films; Screenplay Infinite Films
- Distributed by: Netflix
- Release dates: 22 September 2018 (Fantastic Fest); 19 October 2018
- Running time: 121 minutes
- Country: Indonesia
- Languages: Indonesian; English; Mandarin; French

The Night Comes for Us is a 2018 Indonesian action thriller film written and directed by Timo Tjahjanto. It was originally conceived as a script and adapted into a graphic novel before finally being released as a film. In December 2014, Tjahjanto confirmed he was working with Indonesian artist hub Glitch Network to adapt his original script into comic form. The film stars Iko Uwais, Joe Taslim, Julie Estelle, Sunny Pang, Zack Lee and Shareefa Daanish. In the film, a former crime enforcer (Taslim) sets out to rescue a young girl from the crime syndicate, which later sends a rising gang prospect (Uwais) and legions of thugs to eliminate the enforcer and the young girl.

The Night Comes for Us premiered at Fantastic Fest on 22 September 2018. Four days later, it was announced that Netflix had acquired the distribution rights and the film was released worldwide on 19 October 2018 to positive reviews from critics with praise for its action sequences, direction, plot and cast performances, but criticized its excessive violence.

== Plot ==
Ito is one of six elite enforcers for the South East Asian Triad, known as the Six Seas (Indonesian: enam laut). After massacring a village due to few villagers having stolen Triad drugs, Ito discovers a young survivor named Reina. Ito feels remorseful and kills all the Triad soldiers present. Ito later returns to his childhood home of Jakarta and hides Reina in his ex-girlfriend Shinta's apartment. Shinta treats his wounds and calls in Fatih, a former friend and member of Ito's old gang. Fatih relocates them to his own apartment and brings in his cousin Wisnu and another member of the old gang named "White Boy" Bobby, a drug addict who has lost his leg. He also arranges for Ito and Reina to get new passports and escape the country.

The last member of Ito's old gang whom Ito was closest to, Arian, has moved to Macau where he is running a club for the Triad. Arian brutally slaughters random crooks when they beat up one of his waitresses and take her hostage at the club. A member of the Six Seas named Chien Wu, calls him in to help kill Ito and take his place as a new member of the Six Seas enforcers. Enticed at the idea, Arian accepts the offer. Ito goes to meet an old acquaintance named Yohan. After Ito left Jakarta to join the Six Seas, Yohan took off with the gang's money and began running his own drug business out of his butcher shop. Ito tracks him down to retrieve the money Yohan stole from his old gang; However, Yohan is also revealed to be connected with the Triad and a resulting fight ensues in the meat locker of Yohan's butcher shop. Ito brutally kills Yohan's men, but not before Yohan makes a phone call that brings in corrupt cops, who shoot down Yohan and take Ito away.

Bobby discovers Yohan's thugs infiltrating Fatih's building, where he gets Shinta to safety before killing some thugs on an elevator and returning to help Wisnu and Fatih fight. They are initially successful despite being outnumbered and heavily injured, until two Six Sea members Elena and Alma arrive. Elena kills the last of Yohan's men and Bobby sacrifices his life in order to help Fatih and Reina escape by distracting Elena, who kills Bobby with her kukri. Alma kills Wisnu with a razor-sharp string, but Arian intervenes before she can kill Reina and a heavily injured Fatih, knocking her unconscious. Fatih deduces that Arian told Yohan and the Triad where he lived due to Arian being one of the only members to know where Fatih was located. He refuses further help from Arian and fires a warning shot at him, but is unable to bring himself to kill him. More Triad attempt to ambush Fatih and Reina in the garage. Fatih gets Reina to hide before sacrificing his life by distracting the Triad members. The ambushers are all killed by a mysterious woman nicknamed The Operator.

Ito frees himself and returns to Fatih's, where he discovers his former colleagues dead. Reina finds him and they relocate to Shinta's apartment. The Operator then arrives and attempts to kill Ito. A fight ensues which the Operator wins, but before she can execute Ito, she is persuaded by Reina to talk to him instead of killing him. She states her intentions to eliminate the Six Seas members—Ito included—and tells him of Arian's reappearance in Jakarta. Ito explains that he feels remorse for killing innocent people and tells her to kill him, but she disappears. Chien Wu again meets with Arian.

Initially angry at Arian for stopping Alma from killing Fatih, Chien Wu gives Arian one last chance to kill Ito and offers him Ito's place in the Six Seas should he kill him. When Arian questions why Chien Wu wants to kill Ito, Chien Wu explains that his main goal is to cause chaos within Jakarta so that the Triad can increase their presence there. It was revealed that Ito and Arian, working out of the warehouse the Triad is currently using, once had an argument with the rest of their gang, including Fatih and Bobby. To expand their gang, Bobby was making deals with the Triad outside Ito's approval. Prior to the events, it turned out that Ito left the gang to make peace with the Triad, while Arian followed him to move up in the underworld.

The Operator returns to Ito's apartment in an attempt to get Reina to a safe location, while Ito travels to the warehouse and slaughters all the Triad henchmen there. As more henchmen arrive at Ito's apartment to kill him, The Operator kills them all in quick fashion. When Elena and Alma also arrive, The Operator engages in a brutal fight with them, but manages to kill both. Alma is strangled to death with her own razor string and Elena is disemboweled after a bloody knife fight. Arian takes out a sniper who was about to kill Ito. The two talk about their former lives, and Arian's intention to join the Six Seas. In a long and brutal fight, both are severely wounded. Ito finally gains the upper hand but instead of killing Arian, he leaves.

Chien Wu arrives and insults Arian for his failure to kill Ito a second time. Arian tries to shoot him, but finds that he is out of bullets. Chien Wu has Arian executed with the help of six hitmen led by Arian's assistant, presumably hinting that the assistant is the new Six Seas member in Ito's place. The Operator safely guides Reina to Ito and leaves. Ito puts Reina on a departing ship, but does not board himself. After they mutually wave goodbye for the last time, Ito, who is badly wounded, gets in his car before spotting Chien Wu and more Triad members henchmen in front of him. Grinning savagely, Ito drives his car toward them as they open fire, where his fate and the Triads are left unknown.

== Cast ==
- Joe Taslim as Ito, a former member of the Six Seas Triad who is on the run after saving a young girl.
- Iko Uwais as Arian, a former gang member and friend of Ito who attempts to kill him for his own ambitions of power.
- Asha Kenyeri Bermudez as Reina, a young girl, and survivor of the massacre on her village committed by Ito and other Triad members.
- Sunny Pang as Chien Wu, a current Six Seas member who wants to kill Ito and spread chaos throughout the world.
- Julie Estelle as The Operator, a mysterious woman who is tasked to kill Ito and the rest of the Six Seas members for unknown reasons.
- Salvita Decorte as Shinta, Ito's former girlfriend.
- Abimana Aryasatya as Fatih, Ito's friend, and former gang member alongside Arian.
- Zack Lee as White Boy Bobby Bule, a current drug addict and another former gang member alongside Ito, Fatih, and Arian.
- Dimas Anggara as Wisnu, a former member of Ito's gang.
- Dian Sastrowardoyo as Alma, an enforcer for the Triad, and Chien Wu, who uses a ball attached to a metallic string for weapons.
- Hannah Al Rashid as Elena, another enforcer for the Triad, Chien Wu, and the lover of Alma who uses a Kukri as a weapon.
- Shareefa Daanish as the Triad's sniper
- Ronny P. Tjandra as Aliong
- Morgan Oey as Arian's assistant
- Epy Kusnandar as the Night Handler
- Revaldo as Yohan, A butcher store owner and a former friend of Ito who currently works for the Triad.

== Production ==
In September 2014, pre-production on the film was halted and three months later Tjahjanto confirmed he was adapting the script into a graphic novel.

== Release ==
RADiUS-TWC has acquired North American distribution rights in 2014 prior to the beginning of production, but due to allegations against the label's owner Harvey Weinstein, and its parent company The Weinstein Company about to liquidate its entire assets to Lantern Entertainment, they sold the entire rights to Netflix.

The trailer was released on 10 October 2018. The film was released on 19 October 2018.

== Reception ==
On Rotten Tomatoes, as of October 2021, the film has an approval rating of 91% based on 33 reviews, with an average of 7.6/10. The website's consensus reads, "A bloody thrill ride designed to test the limits of more squeamish viewers, The Night Comes for Us wields a stylishly violent, action-packed punch." Metacritic, which uses a weighted average, assigned a score of 69 out of 100 based on reviews from 6 critics, indicating "generally favorable reviews".

In a positive review, Barry Hertz of The Globe and Mail wrote, "Unless you are on the programming committee for the most literally bloody-minded of film festivals, you have never experienced as ludicrously violent and gore-soaked a film as The Night Comes for Us." Richard Kuipers of Variety wrote: "This cartoonish cavalcade of carnage potently reunites The Raid stars Joe Taslim and Iko Uwais as former friends on a corpse-strewn collision course."

Dan Jackson of Thrillist was more critical of the film. He wrote: "Instead of feeling like the action organically emerges from the situational demands of the narrative, it often feels like the story was reverse engineered to center around the often stunning physical feats."

In October 2018, American comic book artist Robert Liefeld, who co-created the Marvel superhero character Deadpool, praised Tjahjanto's work on the film via his Twitter account. In an enthusiastic reaction, Liefeld suggested that Tjahjanto should be given "all the money for Deadpool 3", referring to the upcoming installment of the Deadpool film series. He then mentioned how Indonesian cinema was influencing other action films and also suggested that Tjahjanto should direct a standalone Cable film.

== Future ==
Tjahjanto has publicly confirmed that he has developed a story for a sequel, likely to focus on Julie Estelle's character The Operator. In 2022, leading up to the release of his second Netflix collaboration, The Big 4, Tjahjanto said that a sequel "is still not official", but that he is hopeful.
