= Arifin Putra =

Indonesian actor

- Born: Putra Arifin Scheunemann; May 1, 1987 (age 39); Mainz, West Germany
- Occupation: Actor
- Years active: 2000–present

Putra Arifin Scheunemann (born 1 May 1987), known professionally as Arifin Putra, is an Indonesian actor. His international recognition is largely attributed to his role in the Indonesian action film The Raid 2: Berandal, which was released in the United States and other major markets around the world. He also starred in the 2009 Indonesian horror film, Rumah Dara (released internationally as Macabre).

== Early life and education ==
Putra Arifin Scheunemann was born on 1 May 1987, in Mainz, West Germany. His German father, Axel Scheunemann, was a gardener turned landscape specialist, while his Indonesian mother, Joyce Sunandar, ran a catering business. He has an older sister, Sari, who works at an automotive company in Stuttgart. His parents divorced in 1999, upon which he and his mother permanently resettled to Indonesia. He reportedly still remains estranged from his father.

Arifin received his early education at the German International School in Jakarta, where he partook in several school plays and showed early interest in acting, often doing reenactments of films for his family. He graduated from the school in 2006 and initially did not intend to pursue a career in the entertainment industry. His parents’ divorce took a toll on him and turned him into a shy and reclusive child, though he eventually regained his cheerful personality with the help and support of his sister. As of 2020, Arifin is pursuing undergraduate studies in business management.

== Career ==
In 2000, Arifin tagged along with his sister to a television commercial shoot and was offered to be an extra, which he accepted on this occasion. At the end of the shoot, Arifin found himself motivated by the fact that he could earn a bit of extra pocket money while having fun. In the same year, he was a finalist in a cover boy competition hosted by a popular Indonesian teen magazine. Arifin was also in the running for MTV Indonesia’s VJ Hunt in 2003. Despite being unsuccessful in that particular competition, one thing led to another for Arifin, and so began his acting career.

=== Television (2000 – 2007) ===
After landing his first major television role as a nerdy high school student on the national TV series Kisah Kasih di Sekolah (lit. High School Love Story) in 2004, Arifin was catapulted into fame. Weekends were dedicated to promoting the series in different parts of the country, and he soon became an instantly recognizable face. He has described this initial exposure to fame as “surreal and flattering, but very odd”. Deciding that he could pursue this as a career, Arifin enrolled at a notable local acting school Sakti Aktor Studio to receive formal training. He juggled a rigorous schedule of school, shooting and refining his acting skills for one-and-a-half year.

=== Film (2008 – present) ===
Arifin's first film was Lost in Love (2008), a sequel to the teen romance flick Eiffel I’m in Love (2003). In Lost in Love, his character was required to speak in French, English and Indonesian, which came natural to him as he took lessons in these languages as a highschooler. His first antagonist role as Adam, a psychopathic cold-blooded cannibal in Macabre (2009), was a departure from the characters he portrayed in previous works. Arifin's performance in the thriller caught the attention of moviegoers and film critics alike, and earned him a number of nominations and awards including Best Supporting Actor from the KUFI Film Awards.

Observes deem Arifin as a highly curious individual. This is apparent in his deliberate choice of film roles. He is particularly drawn to roles that challenge his comfort zone, as first seen in Macabre and subsequently in The Raid 2: Berandal. In Berandal, Arifin portrays the son of Jakarta's most notorious mob boss who is engulfed in his ambitions. He was first offered the part in 2009, but production of the film was delayed until 2012 due to financial issues. He endured three months of intense training in preparation for the physically demanding role and combed through various mafia movies to gain a deep understanding of his character in the film. His role won him two Best Supporting Actor nominations for the Maya Awards and the Indonesian Movie Actors Awards.

Picking up from the success of Berandal, Arifin is concentrating on film from here on out. His next big project, Supernova: Ksatria, Putri dan Bintang Jatuh premiered in December 2014. The film adaptation of Dewi ‘Dee’ Lestari’s bestselling novel of the same title is based on the first installation of the Supernova series. Since then, Arifin has played in various movies, including Negeri Van Oranje (2015), Sabtu Bersama Bapak (2016), and The Professionals (2016). He has also collaborated with HBO Asia on its first original TV Series Halfworlds and in 2017, Arifin reprised his role as Barata in Season 2. The show aired in 26 countries all across the Asia Pacific region.

== Activism ==
Apart from his career in the film industry, Arifin has been active in various philanthropic endeavours, mainly regarding environmental issues. He has been appointed as a WWF Warrior by the World Wildlife Fund Indonesia, and in 2017, as an ambassador for the Dugong and Seagrass Conservation Project (DSCP). The effort is a collaboration between the Indonesian Ministry of Marine Affairs and Fisheries, the Indonesian Institute of Sciences, Bogor Agricultural University, and WWF Indonesia, directed towards the preservation and protection of dugongs and seagrasses.

== Filmography ==
Films
Year	Title	Role	Notes
2008	Lost in Love	Alex	Film debut
2009	Macabre	Adam	Directed by Mo Brothers
2009	Aku Perempuan	Marwan	Short film
2011	Batas	Arief	Directed by Rudi Soedjarwo
2011	Foxtrot 6	Nidas	Short film
2011	Hati Merdeka	Captain Sofwan	Final chapter to the Merdeka trilogy
2011	Badai di Ujung Negeri	Badai	
2013	Blue Blood	Asep	Short film
2014	Yasmine	Halim	Cameo
2014	The Raid 2	Uco	Directed by Gareth Evans
2014	Supernova: Ksatria, Putri, dan Bintang Jatuh	Reuben	Directed by Rizal Mantovani
2016	The Professionals	Reza	Directed by Affandy Abdul Rahman
2019	Foxtrot Six	Tino	Directed by Randy Korompis
2024	The Architecture of Love	Alam	
2024	Angels Fallen: Warriors of Peace	Trigger	Directed by Ali Zamani
2024	Bogieville	Ham	

Television
Year	Title	Role	Broadcaster	Production company
2003	Senandung Masa Puber	Rangga	Trans TV	Multivision Plus
2004	Kisah Kasih di Sekolah	Daniel	RCTI	SinemArt Pictures
2005	Manusia Bodoh	Reyhan	RCTI	SinemArt Pictures
2005	Khaylaan Tingkat Tinggi	Nuno	SCTV	SinemArt Pictures
2006	Kau Masih Kekasihku	Kevin	SCTV	SinemArt Pictures
2007	Mawar	Doni	RCTI	SinemArt Pictures
2009	Setinggi Bintang	Andhika	Astro	Multivision Plus
2012	Dewa	Yudha	RCTI	SinemArt Pictures
2012	Mimo Ketemu Poscha	Damar	RCTI	SinemArt Pictures
2012	Asmara	Don	RCTI	SinemArt Pictures
2013	Aprilio & Julie	Jodi	RCTI	SinemArt Pictures

Theatre
Year2026	Titlepart time wife	Roleadimas	Production company Netflix
2005	Mass Appeal	Mark Dolson	Sakti Aktor Studio
2005	Lone Star	Ray	Sakti Aktor Studio

Music Videos
Year	Song	Artist
2004	Kisah Kasih di Sekolah	Chrisye
2011	Bersabarlah Cinta	Letto

TV Commercials
Year	Product
2001	Biore
2003	Rexona
2005	Espresso
2005	Pond's
2005	Close-Up
2008	Indosat

== Accolades ==
Year	Award	Category	Nominated work	Result
2000	Aneka Yes! Talent Search	Cover Boy	Himself	Finalist
2003	BC Bar Youth TV Icon	TV Icon	Himself	Won
2005	Gadis Magazine Award	Most Wanted	Himself	Won
2009	B'Girl Award	Dream Boy	Himself	Won
2010	CLEO's Most Eligible Bachelor Award	Most Eligible Bachelor	Himself	Top 5 Finalists
2011	KUFI Film Awards	Best Supporting Actor	Macabre	Won
2014	Maya Awards	Best Supporting Actor	The Raid 2	Won
