= Zack Lee =

British-Indonesian actor (born 1984)

- Born: Zack Lee Jowono; 15 August 1984 (age 42); Liverpool, England
- Occupations: Actor; model; boxer
- Years active: 2002–present
- Spouse: Nafa Urbach (m. 2007; div. 2017)
- Children: 1
- Parent(s): Hendra and Ayu Jowono

Zack Lee Jowono (born 15 August 1984) (Note: Chinese: 扎克·李; pinyin: Zhākè·Lǐ) is an British-born Indonesian actor, model and boxer of Chinese descent.

== Career ==
Lee began his career as a model before appearing in soap operas in the mid 2000s. His most memorable role in the 2005 action movie Bad Wolves, as the leader of a bloodthirsty gang, won him favorable reviews.

In 2013 Lee earned a role in The Raid 2: Berandal which premiered at Sundance Film Festival 2014 and was released in Indonesia and United States in the same year. In 2016, he starred in Headshot which premiered at Midnight Madness Toronto International Film Festival 2016. Later in 2018, he starred in Buffalo Boys which became Singapore’s official entry for 91st Academy Awards for Best Foreign Language Film. He also starred in the HBO Asia Original Series, Grisse. Zack is possibly best known from The Night Comes for Us which premiered in Fantastic Fest 2018 and became the first Netflix Original Feature from Indonesia.

Besides acting, Lee is also passionate about food and cooking. He and his family are also food entrepreneurs. He also owns a noodle shop called Bakmi Omlee.

== Personal life ==
Lee was born in Liverpool to a British mother and an Indonesian father with Chinese descent. He is the second in a family of five children, brought up as a Buddhist. After the divorce of his parents when he was three, Zack went to live with his father in Jakarta. He converted to Christianity when he was 19 years old. He married Nafa Urbach in 2015, That same year, the couple went to Jerusalem to perform a religious pilgrimage, as part of their honeymoon. The couple have one daughter.

During the August 2025 riot in Indonesia, his house in Bintaro became a target of looting after angry mobs mistaken his house belonged to his ex-wife.

== Filmography ==
=== Film ===
- Bad Wolves (2005)
- Drown Boy, Drown (2008)
- The Raid 2: Berandal (2014)
- Wanita Berdarah (2014)
- Midnight Show (2015)
- Headshot (2016)
- The Night Comes for Us (2018)
- Buffalo Boys (2018)
- Jaga Pocong (2018)
- Gundala (2019)
- EXILED: The Chosen Ones (2022)

=== FTV ===
- You've Got Ism@il (2011) with Sabai Morscheck
- Kucari Namamu (2011) with Roger Danuarta
- Suamiku Direbut Teman Kuliahnya (2014) with Ririn Dwi Ariyanti
- Aku Dewi Bukan Dewo (2015) with Irene Librawati
- Bali Moon (2015) with Jerry Lawalata

=== Television ===
- Ilalang Sepanjang Jalan
- Preman Kampus
- Kugapai Cintamu
- Gadis
- Ilalang
- Karnaval
- Manusia Harimau

== See also ==
- Indo people
- List of converts to Christianity
