= Iko Uwais =

Indonesian actor and martial artist (born 1983)

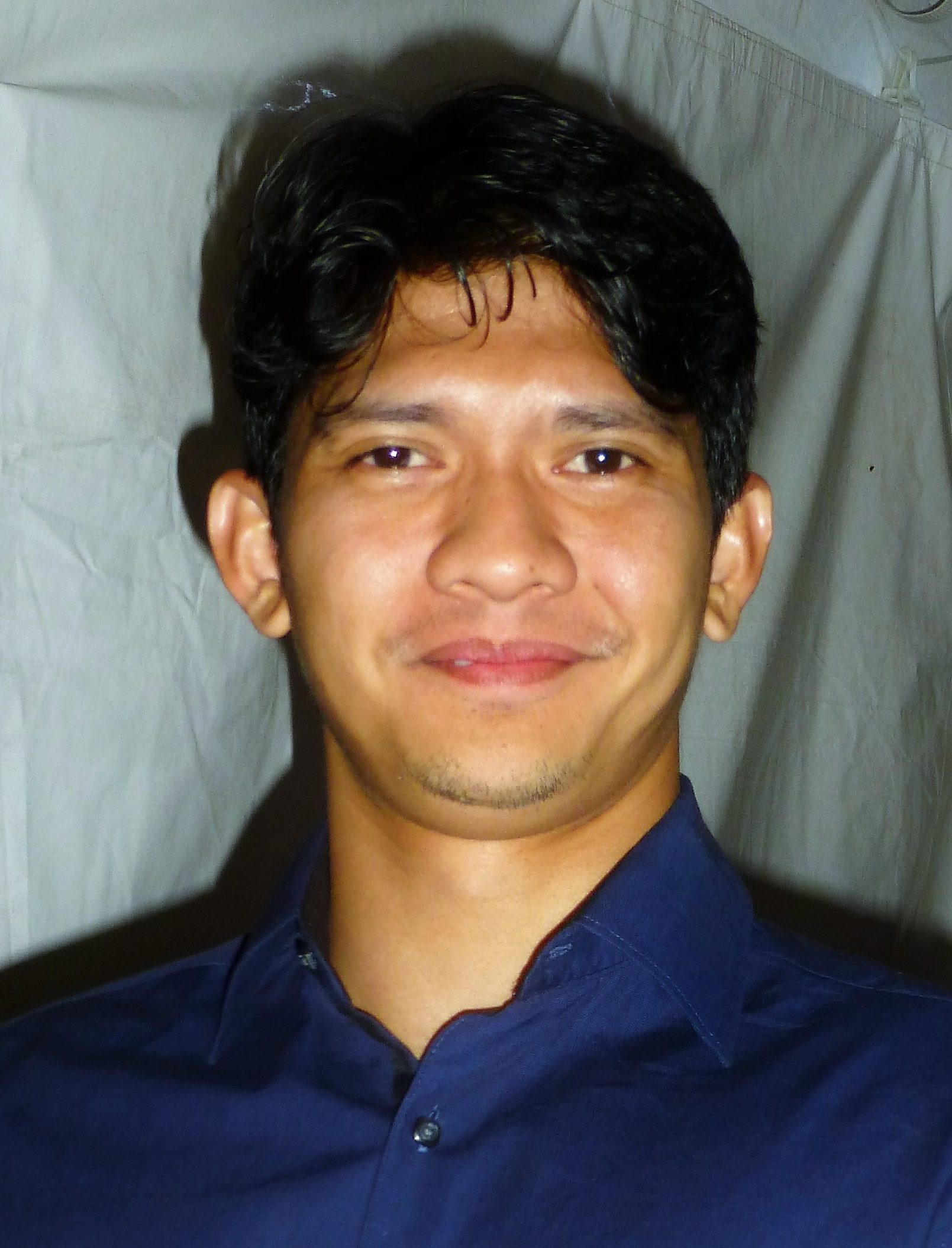
- Uwais in 2016
- Born: Uwais Qorny; 12 February 1983 (age 43); Jakarta, Indonesia
- Occupations: Actor; stuntman; fight choreographer; martial artist; director; producer
- Years active: 2007–present
- Spouse: Audy Item (m. 2012)
- Children: 2
- Martial arts career
- Style: Silat Tiga Berantai

Uwais Qorny (pronounced [uˌwaɪs ˈkɔrni], born 12 February 1983), known professionally as Iko Uwais, is an Indonesian actor, stuntman, fight choreographer, and martial artist. He is best known for acting in the action films Merantau (2009), The Raid (2011), The Raid 2 (2014), Headshot (2016), Mile 22 (2018), The Night Comes for Us (2018), Stuber (2019), and the Netflix series Wu Assassins (2019–22).

== Early life ==
Qorny was born in Jakarta, to Musthafa and Maisyaroh Kamaluddin. His grandfather, H. Achmad Bunawar, was a silat master and founded a silat school. He is named after the 7th-century Islamic figure Owais al-Qarani.

== Career ==
In 2007, Uwais met director Gareth Evans, who was filming a documentary about silat, a form of martial arts, in Uwais's training hall. Uwais's natural charisma and great camera presence encouraged Evans to cast him as the leading role for his first martial art movie, Merantau. After signing a five-year contract with Gareth Evans and his production company, Uwais resigned from his daytime job as an operational driver at Esia, an Indonesian telecom company.

In his first acting experience in Merantau, Uwais played the role of a young Minang (West-Sumatran), which led him to learn the Minang style of silat harimau (tiger style) from Master Edwel Datuk Rajo Gampo Alam. Merantau was released in Indonesia on 6 August 2009. The film was featured in Puchon International Fantastic Film Festival in South Korea and Fantastic Fest in Austin, Texas with highly positive reviews. Merantau won the Best Film award at ActionFest 2010.

Uwais's second collaboration with Gareth Evans was The Raid (known as The Raid: Redemption in the United States), which began filming in mid-March 2011 and was released in mid-2012. The movie has been hailed by critics and audiences in various festivals as one of the best martial art movies in years. The following year, Uwais appeared in a small role in Keanu Reeves's directorial debut Man of Tai Chi.

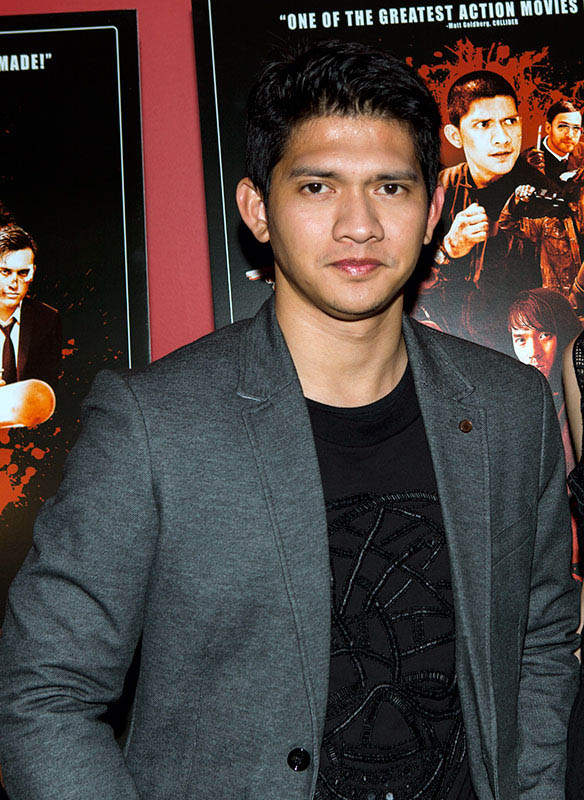
Uwais at the New York premiere of The Raid 2 in March 2014

In 2014, Uwais collaborated on a third movie with Evans, The Raid 2, a sequel to the original film. Uwais also appeared briefly in Star Wars: The Force Awakens (2015), alongside his The Raid 2 co-stars Yayan Ruhian and Cecep Arif Rahman. He was also asked to choreograph a lightsaber fight in the film by director J. J. Abrams, but the sequence was rejected for being too violent.

In 2016, he appeared in the martial arts film Headshot, which received generally positive reviews.

In 2017, he filmed the international martial arts film Triple Threat, together with Tony Jaa, Michael Jai White, Tiger Chen, and Scott Adkins—the film was released in early 2019. In 2018, Uwais starred in the films, Mile 22 and The Night Comes for Us.

In the same year, it was announced that Uwais was cast in the lead role of Kai Jin on the Netflix series, Wu Assassins. The series premiered on 8 August 2019. Uwais reprised his role in the sequel film, Fistful of Vengeance. It was released on 17 February 2022 to mixed reviews.

In 2019, Uwais starred in the action comedy film Stuber alongside Kumail Nanjiani and Dave Bautista. In the same year, it was announced that Uwais would appear in a film called Chinatown Express playing a man who must fight through the gangland of New York to save his family after the disappearance of his son during a gang's killing spree. Uwais was also announced to star in The Bellhop, one of the first five films in development by Balboa Productions, the new production company co-founded by Sylvester Stallone in 2018.

Uwais played Hard Master in Snake Eyes, a spin-off from the G.I. Joe movie franchise. The film was released on 23 July 2021.

In October 2021, Uwais joined the cast of Expend4bles, which was released in 2023 to poor reviews. In May 2023, Iko Uwais was announced to star in a sci-fi thriller Ash directed by Flying Lotus alongside Aaron Paul, Eiza González, Beulah Koale, and Kate Elliott.

In January 2025, Uwais revealed that he had started a film production company, Uwais Pictures. The company's initial slate of films includes Uwais's directorial debut Timur, a dramatization of the Mapenduma hostage crisis that Uwais also stars in.

== Personal life ==
On 25 June 2012, Uwais married singer Audy Item at the Hotel Gran Mahakam in Jakarta. The couple have two daughters, Atreya Syahla Putri Uwais and Aneska Layla Putri Uwais.

== Filmography ==
=== Film ===
Year	Title	Role	Director(s)	Notes	Ref.
2009	Merantau	Yuda	Gareth Evans		
2011	The Raid	Rama	Gareth Evans	Also as action choreographer	
2013	Man of Tai Chi	Gilang Sanjaya	Keanu Reeves	US debut	
2014	The Raid 2	Rama/Yuda	Gareth Evans	Also as fight choreographer	
2015	Star Wars: The Force Awakens	Razoo Qin-Fee	J. J. Abrams	Cameo	
2016	Headshot	Ishmael/Abdi	The Mo Brothers		
2017	Beyond Skyline	Sua	Liam O'Donnell	Also as action choreographer	
2018	The Night Comes for Us	Arian	Timo Tjahjanto	Also as action coordinator	
2018	Mile 22	Li Noor	Peter Berg	Also as co-fight choreographer	
2019	Triple Threat	Jaka	Jesse V. Johnson		
2019	Stuber	Oka Tedjo	Michael Dowse	Also as action choreographer	
2021	Snake Eyes	Hard Master	Robert Schwentke		
2022	Fistful of Vengeance	Kai Jin	Roel Reiné		
2023	Expend4bles	Suarto Rahmat	Scott Waugh		
2024	Marni: The Story of Wewe Gombel	—N/a	Billy Christian	Also as stunt choreographer	
2025	Ash	Adhi	Flying Lotus		
2025	Ikatan Darah	—N/a	Sidharta Tata	Also as executive producer	
2025	Timur	Timur	Himself	Directorial debut, also as executive producer	
2026	Wings of Dread	Paquet	Ashton Chen; Pengfei Qin	Hong Kong debut	
TBA	Skyline: Warpath	Sua	Liam O'Donnell		
TBA	The Bellhop				
TBA	Chinatown Express				
TBA	Road House 2		Ilya Naishuller	Post-production	
TBA	Pendekar: Warrior	Abah Jaya	John Radel		

=== Television ===
Year	Title	Role	Network	Notes	Ref.
2019	Wu Assassins	Kai Jin	Netflix	Main role; also as executive producer and lead fight choreographer	

== Awards and nominations ==
Year	Organisation	Award	Work	Result	Ref.
2010	Indonesian Movie Awards	Best Newcomer Actor	Merantau	Nominated	
2010	Indonesian Movie Awards	Favorite Newcomer Actor	Merantau	Nominated	
2013	Indonesian Movie Awards	Best Chemistry (shared with Donny Alamsyah)	The Raid	Nominated	
2014	Indonesian Choice Awards	Actor of the Year	Himself	Nominated	
2014	Indonesian Yahoo! Celebrity Awards	Most Wanted Male	Himself	Nominated	
2014	Republika Awards	The Best Republika's Change Figure	Himself	Won	
2016	Infotainment Awards	Indonesian Celebrity of World Achievement	Himself	Won	
2016	JawaPos Group Awards	Actor of the Year	Himself	Won	
2024	Golden Raspberry Awards	Worst Screen Combo	Expend4bles	Nominated	

== See also ==
- Cinema of Indonesia
- Martial arts film
