= Jakarta International Film Festival =

Film festival

- Location: Jakarta, Indonesia
- Founded: 1999
- Most recent: 2014

Jakarta International Film Festival (Indonesian: Festival Film Internasional Jakarta) or JiFFest is the major film festival of Indonesia held every December in the capital, Jakarta, since 1999. The festival is on a shaky financial footing and is hoping to continue by switching its funding source from foreign donors to government grants and private donations.

== Festival highlights ==
The number of Indonesian films shown at the festival had grown from four in 1999 to around 100 by 2009. Since 2006, JIFFEST has hosted an Indonesian Feature Film Competition with foreign film professionals acting as juries. JIFFEST's script development competition and workshop winners include Wahyu Aditya (2004), World Champion International Young Creative Entrepreneur of the Year (2007); Tumpal Tampubolon (2005), Asian Young Filmmakers Fellow Korea (2008); Salman Aristo (2006), writer of Ayat-Ayat Cinta (2007), Laskar Pelangi (2008), and Garuda di Dadaku (2009); Yuli Andari Merdekaningtyas (2006), and director of Suster Apung, winner of Eagle Awards Metro TV (2006).

=== 1999 ===
Shanty Harmayn and Natacha Devillers, working together at Salto Films at the time, founded the Jakarta International Film Festival (JIFFEST) in November 1999.

=== 2000 ===
In its second year (3–12 November 2000), 104 titles from 31 countries were screened.

=== 2001: Questioning Indonesian identity through film ===
In 2001, JIFFEST (26 October – 10 November) featured 103 titles from 32 countries.

=== 2002: A celebration of cultural diversity ===
In its fourth year (24 October – 3 November), JIFFEST offered 120 titles from 29 countries.

=== 2003: understanding change ===
The fifth year (14–19 October) was JIFFESTs shortest festival to that date, due to funding problems caused by national tragedies such as the Bali bombing. Various obstacles faced by the committee almost kept JIFFEST 2003 from being held. Bomb threats in several cities caused people to fear attending the event. JIFFEST 2003 was therefore held on a very modest scale.

=== 2004: Spirit of youth ===
In 2004 (3–12 December), JIFFEST screened 133 titles from 35 countries.

=== 2005: Special section for documentaries ===
The Seventh edition of JIFFEST took place from 9–18 December 2005.

=== 2006: The lollipop year ===
The eighth JIFFEST was held from 8–17 December 2006.

=== 2007: The colorful horse ===
In its ninth year, JIFFEST was held from 7–16 December 2007. Around 180 films from 33 countries were screened in Djakarta XXI, the newly built Blitzmegaplex in Grand Indonesia, Kineforum in Ismail Marzuki Arts Centre, and cultural centers Goethe Haus and Erasmus Huis.

JIFFEST entered a partnership with the American Film Institute and its AFI Project 20/20, bringing titles like American Fork, Big Rig, Spine Tingler: The William Castle Story, Afghan Muscles, Cyrano Fernandez, Please Vote For Me, and Faro: Goddess of the Waters. The World Cinema Fund from the Berlin International Film Festival sent the titles Atos dos Homens, Naousse, El Otro, Rome Rather than You, El Custodio, Possible Lives, and Suely in the Sky.

Among other events were Producer Panel, hosted by Shanty Harmayn and featuring film producers Michelle Yeoh from Malaysia and Lorna Tee from Hong Kong; Documentary Panel, hosted by Shanty Harmayn and featuring documentary filmmakers Pimpaka Towira from Thailand and Tan Pin Pin from Singapore; and a roundtable workshop on "How to Package Your DVD Release", hosted by Jeffrey Schwarz, CEO of Automat Pictures from the United States.

=== 2008: One decade of JIFFEST ===
For its tenth anniversary, the JIFFEST committee had originally planned to stage their biggest ever festival. However, the 2008 financial crisis and difficulty raising funds forced the festival to be scaled down to a five-day event.

=== 2009: The eleventh JIFFEST ===
The JIFFEST 2009 line-up included some of the best of worldwide films, including those from ASEAN and the Madani Film Festival. There was an Islamic-themed program that was created together with rumahfilm.org, which was planned to run as a separate event the following year.

The presence of Christian Scheurer (visual consultant for The Matrix) and Petr Lom, who recorded Iran's President Mahmoud Ahmadinejad's activities, were popular events, as were discussion panels on the topic of film promotion and marketing and the launch of Amir Muhammad’s book Yasmin Ahmad's Films.

The opening film, Sang Pemimpi, was the first Indonesian film featured as a JIFFEST opening film. The closing film was New York, I Love You. In between were films representing 25 countries.

=== 2010: And JIFFEST for all ===
For its twelfth year, JIFFEST was held from 26 November to 5 December 2010 at Blitzmegaplex Pacific Place, Kineforum in the Ismail Marzuki Arts Centre, and Bina Nusantara University International Campus, Jakarta. The main source of funding of JIFFEST came from foreign donors, and after its tenth year, the support ceased to exist. JIFFEST must now rely on the support of the government and local sponsors.

Films screened included Waiting for Superman, The Day We Connect, Scott Pilgrim vs. the World, Outrage, The Wedding Photographer (Bröllopsfotografen), Uncle Boonmee Who Can Recall His Past Lives, and When We Leave (Die Fremde).

=== 2013: New Chapter ===
For its thirteenth year, JIFFEST 2013 was held again starting from 15 November to 30 November 2013, after the vacuum during the past two years. The 13th year it happened thanks to the collaboration with Muvila.com, Enjoy Jakarta, Jive Entertainment, Blitzmegaplex, and Galeri Indonesia Kaya. There are four programs in JIFFEST 2013. The first is "Pop-Up Festival", the second program was the "Retrospektif Boon Jung Ho", then there are the "World Cinema", and the last is an "Open Air Cinema".

=== 2014: Culinary Cinema ===
JIFFFEST 2014 was held from the 14th November to 6 December 2014. The program consist of;

- "Indonesia Film Gathering" at the Mango Tree Epicentrum.
- "Pop-up Cinema" at the GALERI INDONESIA KAYA. (The screening of Indonesian short films continued with discussion & Q-A Sessions).
- "World Cinema" at the Epicentrum XXI & Blitzmegaplex Grand Indonesia. (A worldwide screening of films that has been curated by the JIFFEST 2014 programme team).

== See also ==
- Cinema of Indonesia
- Indonesian Film Festival
