= Kaskus =

Indonesian Internet forum

PT Darta Media Indonesia
- Website type: Internet forum, classifieds
- Available in: Indonesian
- Headquarters: Jakarta, Indonesia
- Area served: Worldwide
- Owner: GDP Venture
- Founders: Andrew Darwis; Ronald Stephanus; Budi Dharmawan
- Website: kaskus.co.id
- Advertising: Some
- Commercial: Yes
- Registration: Optional
- Launched: 6 November 1999; 27 years ago

Kaskus is an Indonesian Internet forum that describes itself as "the largest Indonesian community". Registration is required for new users to participate in the community, and every registered member has access to more than twenty regional and subject-related sub-forums. The community initially used the vBulletin forum but switched to a new engine they developed called "New Kaskus" in mid-2012.

== History ==
Kaskus was created on November 6, 1999, by Indonesian students Andrew Darwis, Ronald Stephanus, Ken Dean Lawadinata, and Budi Dharmawan. Kaskus was originally intended as an informal forum for Indonesian students abroad. The name Kaskus itself is an abbreviation of the word "Kasak-Kusuk" which translates to 'gibberish' or 'whispers'.

PC Magazine Indonesia named Kaskus in August 2005 as being the best site and largest online community and in 2006, as the choice of readers in 2006. On May 23, 2006, the management was forced to change their .com domain to .us, due to the outbreak of the Brontok virus which was created to attack large sites in Indonesia. By the beginning of April 2007, Kaskus management added two new Dell Servers to improve Kaskus's website performance. In July 2008, Kaskus management decided to operate the server in Indonesia. For this purpose, Kaskus purchased eight Dell PowerEdge 2950 servers and operated them via a network of open IXP. This resulted in multiple access to Kaskus and eventually added eight more servers to handle the requests.

In March 2008, after convincing his cousin Andrew to expand and create a proper business out of Kaskus, Ken Dean Lawadinata came on board as partner and CEO. PT Darta Media Indonesia was then created as the parent company of Kaskus. By the end of 2008, Kaskus went on a major expansion and changes in its product line and vision (including the closure of the forum's adult section and reformulation of the "debate club" forum due to Indonesian cybercrime laws, and its first redesign to coincide with that year's Independence Day) to become the largest forum in Indonesia, and reached its first million user base. That same year, the forum was involved in a feud with a local hacking community called YogyaFree, in which both websites were subjected to website defacements and distributed denial of service attacks by each other's users.

In 2011, Kaskus management announced the expansion of its business by establishing a relationship of cooperation with the investment of Global Digital Prima into Kaskus, which is a subsidiary of Djarum, as well as increasing the number of servers owned to over 250. They also plan on recruiting up to 80 new personnel. In August 2012, Kaskus had more than 4,000,000 registered accounts. On May 26, 2012, Kaskus management was forced to change their domain from .us to .co.id because of errors on the Domain Name System (DNS); a rival forum named Selapa took advantage of the DNS error, redirecting the old domain to their site. In 2012, Kaskus management developed their forum engine officially called Kaskus 2.0, called the New Kaskus by Kaskus's users. When the engine reached a beta stage, selected users used the forum with the engine, while non-selected users still used the vBulletin version. By the end of 2012, a complete conversion to Kaskus 2.0 was completed. Some threads and posts could not be transferred to the new engine, so Kaskus management decided to keep them accessible through the vBulletin version of the forum (called Old Kaskus by the users).

By 2014 Kaskus had more than 25 million unique users and was a famous homegrown site in Indonesia. This year Kaskus also went through some changes with Ken Dean Lawadinata after his 7 years of turnaround of Kaskus from a 1-man forum site to Indonesia's leading online forum, moved up to become the new Chairman of PT Darta Media Indonesia, with Martin Hartono assuming the day-to-day operation as the new CEO. Andrew Darwis also moved from his office of CTO to become the Chief Community Officer for Kaskus.

In September 2015, the forum's trading section (Forum Jual Beli) was rocked by an scam involving a long-running escrow service (referred by its users as rekening bersama) called Blackpanda, in which both sellers and buyers lost over Rp. 500 million to escrow owner Roy Widya. Widya was alleged to have misused the escrow funds for gambling. The incident is widely cited as the decline of Kaskus' popularity.

In 2016, the story of the website was adapted into a movie called Sundul Gan: The Story of Kaskus.

== Services ==
=== KasPay ===
KasPay provides an online payment system. It was launched on November 6, 2009, on the 10th Anniversary Celebration of Kaskus at Poste, the east building, Kuningan, Jakarta. This service can be used on websites that are affiliated with KasPay. KasPay, functioning as an e-wallet, facilitates online buying and selling transactions. This service is available on websites affiliated with KasPay. Transactions through KasPay involve money transfers, which are aimed at enhancing security and reducing the risk of credit card fraud.

Transaction security is maintained with an e-mail confirmation and the keeping of records.

=== E-pulsa ===
E-pulse provides cellphone credits and charging facilities. Transactions on e-pulse can only be done through KasPay.

=== Kaskus Ads ===
Kaskus Ads Service (abbreviated as KAD) allows Kaskus and KasPay users to place advertisements on the Kaskus community forum for a cost.

=== Kaskus Radio ===
Kaskus Radio (commonly abbreviated as KR) is an Internet radio powered by Kaskus Network. It has more than 20 broadcasters. The radio broadcasts a variety of songs in languages such as English, Mandarin, Japanese, and Korean.

=== Kaskus Mobile ===
Kaskus Mobile allows visitors to use the mobile version of Kaskus. Users can reply to and create a new topic through their mobile phone with this service. Kaskus Mobile is accessible via mobile phones. It is also possible to access the service through PC browsers by visiting Kaskus mobile site. Kaskus also provides Android and iOS apps.
