= Skyline (film series) =

American film series

- Official film series logo
- Created by: Joshua Cordes; Liam O'Donnell
- Original work: Skyline (2010)
- Owners: Universal Pictures (1); Vertical Entertainment (2-3); XYZ Films (4)
- Years: 2010–present

Films and television
- Films: Skyline; Beyond Skyline; Skylines; Skyline: Warpath

The Skyline film series consists of American science fiction-disaster alien action films. Created by Joshua Cordes and Liam O'Donnell, the series centers around a global alien invasion and the uprise of mankind to fight back and save humanity. The series implements various genres within each installment.

The first film was met with negative critical reception but was a box office success, given its smaller production budget. The second installment was met with a generally positive reception from film critics, and was not a box office success. A third film, which mas made in part by a distribution deal with Netflix, was met with mixed reception.

== Films ==
Film	U.S. release date	Director(s)	Screenwriter	Story by	Producers
Skyline	November 12, 2010	Greg Strause & Colin Strause	Joshua Cordes & Liam O'Donnell	Joshua Cordes & Liam O'Donnell	Greg Strause, Colin Strause, Kristian Andresen and Liam O'Donnell
Beyond Skyline	December 15, 2017	Liam O'Donnell	Liam O'Donnell	Liam O'Donnell	Matthew E. Chausse, Liam O'Donnell, Colin Strause and Greg Strause
Skylines	December 18, 2020	Liam O'Donnell	Liam O'Donnell	Matthew E. Chausse & Liam O'Donnell	Matthew E. Chausse, Liam O'Donnell, Colin Strause and Greg Strause
Skyline: Warpath	TBA	Liam O'Donnell	Liam O'Donnell	Liam O'Donnell	Matthew E. Chausse and Evangelo Kioussis

=== Skyline (2010) ===
Jarrod and Elaine take a trip to Southern California for a getaway trip and to visit his friend named Terry. Their vacation quickly turns into an horrific weekend of terror, when an alien invasion follows a night of hypnotizing strange lights in the sky. What starts off as a city under attack, quickly becomes a worldwide takeover. While the city is under attack and thousands of terrified people are abducted into the ships, Jarrod and Elaine work together with their companions to survive the ensuing global genocide.

=== Beyond Skyline (2017) ===
During an alien invasion, Detective Mark Corley braves the warzone and infiltrates their ships, after his estranged son named Trent is abducted. Upon entering the spacecraft, Corley works with some unlikely allies in his rescue efforts. While aboard the ship Corley discovers that the extraterrestrials are harvesting humans for their brainpower. In his pursuits, he receives assistance from a friendly alien lifeform, who's revealed to be living embodiment of Jerrod's intelligence. As Elaine passes away giving birth to their daughter, Jerrod and Detective Corley work together to free Trent and escape the spaceship, while protecting the newborn from its otherworldly inhabitants. During the ensuing fight, Trent is overpowered and his brain is harvested to be used by one of the aliens. When the flying saucer takes a crash-landing into Southeast Asia, the team must form an alliance with a small group of survivors to take back the planet. Meanwhile, it's discovered that exposure to the DNA altering technology has left the baby Rose, who ages rapidly, with enhanced powers and abilities that may be key to defeating the planetary invaders.

=== Skylines (2020) ===
After years of working together, a virus from another planet begins to turn humans-turned-alien hybrids against their allied forces. Captain Rose Corley, who has alien-enhanced DNA and has reached adult age, forms a team to venture to the extraterrestrial home world. Together this team works to find a cure against this unknown ailment plaguing and prevent a once all out war from once again overrunning the Earth. As they fight for survival, Rose works to outsmart the enemies with the benefit of her otherworldly knowledge, and reestablish the once forming peace.

=== Skyline: Warpath (TBA) ===
In December 2020, writer/director O'Donnell announced plans to continue the series, with intentions to bring back the featured cast. That same month, Frank Grillo expressed interest in reprising his role in the series. By August 2021, O'Donnell announced that he had finished writing the script, while revealing the official title to be Skyline Radial. The filmmaker stated that the plot will include a father/daughter reunion plot, while acknowledging that he may have some rewrites to complete in the future.

In May 2022, it was announced that O'Donnell will once again serve as writer/director for the new movie. The filmmaker stated that he views the installment as the Fast Five or The Avengers equivalent in the film series, where various characters from previous movies will team up for a "bigger...sci-fi martial arts adventure." Principal photography was scheduled to commence later that year, with Screen Media acting as the international distribution sales company in collaboration with its parent company Chicken Soup for the Soul Entertainment, while a distributor would be determined following a presence at the 2022 Cannes Film Festival. Grillo and Lindsey Morgan are slated to reprise their respective roles, with the plot centering around Col. Rose Corley hiring a crew with a planned mission of freeing her father Det. Mark Corley from an alien prison; while coming into conflict with the most powerful force in the universe, an alien race called The Radial.

In January 2024, it was announced that the film, now retitled Skyline: Warpath, had commenced principal photography in Indonesia. Iko Uwais was reported to return as Sua, with Scott Adkins, Louis Mandylor, Randall Bacon, and Yayan Ruhian joining the cast. XYZ Films will distribute the movie.

== Development ==
Film series co-writer and three-time director, Liam O'Donnell stated that the each installment intentionally explores additional science fiction genres. The filmmaker stated that various directors were influential on his work within the series, including: James Cameron, Kathryn Bigelow, George Miller, Paul Verhoeven, John Carpenter, George Lucas, Steven Spielberg, James Wan, Leigh Whannell, and Jordan Peele.

Skyline, which the filmmaker stated was limited by a smaller budget, was intended to be similar in tone to found-footage horror. Creatives involved were intent with depicting a realistic real-world alien invasion. With the extensive post-production process, the project consisted of extensive CGI special effects, where much of the budget was spent.

O'Donnell stated that with the second film, Beyond Skyline, all creatives involved were intent on making up for the areas in which the first was lacking. The filmmaker stated that he intentionally used practical effects as often as was possible to provide the alien characters with more personality and interaction with each actor. With intentions to introduce a greater level of action sequences, the premise was conceptualized as "John McClane.. in an alien invasion scenario." With fight choreography inspired by the martial arts film genre, the movie has been compared favorably to The Raid.

The third film Skylines, embraced the science fiction elements that were well received in the previous release with O'Donnell looking to James Cameron's Aliens for referential inspiration. With each release, the filmmaker stated that his primary focus has been on character development.

During production of Skyline: Warpath, O'Donnell stated that the movie will be influenced by Star Trek; while also calling the movie a team-up similar to Fast Five or The Avengers, with the fourth Skyline movie including various characters from previous installments teaming up to fight the villainous alien race.

== Main cast and characters ==
List indicators

This section includes characters who will appear or have appeared in more than two films in the series.

- An empty grey cell indicates the character was not in the film, or that the character's official presence has not yet been confirmed.
- ^{A} indicates an appearance through archival footage or audio.
- ^{C} indicates a cameo role.
- ^{P} indicates an appearance in onscreen photographs.
- ^{S} indicates an appearance through use of special effects.
- ^{Y} indicates a younger version of the character.

Character	Film			
Character	Skyline	Beyond Skyline	Skylines	Skyline: Warpath
Principal cast
Jarrod	Eric Balfour (Note: CGI special effects are used to portray Jarrod, in his alien-form.)	Tony Black^{C} (Note: A combination of practical and CGI special effects are used to portray Jarrod, in his alien-form.)	Tony Black^{A}^{C} (Note: Practical effects are used in the archive footage that portrays Jarrod, in his alien-form.)	
Elaine	Scottie Thompson	Samantha Jean	Samantha Jean^{A}^{C}	
Det. Mark Corley		Frank Grillo	Frank Grillo^{A}^{C}	Frank Grillo
Audrey		Bojana Novakovic	Bojana Novakovic^{A}^{C}	
Capt. Rose Corley		Dhara Kinanti Akhmad^{Y}^{C} (Note: Akhmad portrays Rose, as a newborn baby.) Katherine Haiden^{Y}^{C} (Note: Haiden portrays Rose, at the age of 18 months.) Alaina Jayaraz^{Y} (Note: Jayaraz portrays Rose, at the age of 3-years-old.) Lindsey Morgan	Lindsey Morgan Dhara Kinanti Akmad^{Y}^{A}^{C} (Note: Akhmad portrays Rose, as a newborn baby.) Katherine Haiden^{Y}^{A}^{C} (Note: Haiden portrays Rose, at 18-months-old.) Alaina Jayaraz^{Y}^{A}^{C} (Note: Jayaraz portrays Rose, as a 3-year-old.)	Lindsey Morgan
Trent Corley		Jonny Weston (Note: A combination of practical and CGI special effects are used to portray Trent, in his alien-form.) Camden Quaintance^{Y} Jack Chausse^{Y}	Jeremy Fitzgerald (Note: A combination of practical and CGI special effects portray Trent, in his alien-form.)	
Leon			Jonathan Howard	
Supporting cast
Terry	Donald Faison			
Candice	Brittany Daniel			
Denise	Crystal Reed			
Oliver	David Zayas			
Ray	Neil Hopkins			
Jen	Tanya Newbould			
Colin	J. Paul Boehmer			
Garcia		Jacob Vargas		
Sarge		Antonio Fargas		
Jones		Betty Gabriel		
Dr. Harper		Callan Mulvey		
Sua		Iko Uwais		Iko Uwais
Kanya		Pamelyn Chee		
Huana		Yayan Ruhian	Yayan Ruhian	Yayan Ruhian
Dr. Mal			Rhona Mitra	
Alexi			Ieva Andrejevaitė	
Zhi			Cha-Lee Yoon	
Grant			James Cosmo	
Kate			Naomi Tankel	
Gen. Radford			Alexander Siddig	
Owens			Daniel Bernhardt	
the Matriarch			Phong Giang (Note: A combination of practical and CGI special effects were used to portray the Matriarch.)	

== Additional crew and production details ==
Film	Crew/Detail					
Film	Composer	Cinematographer	Editor(s)	Production companies	Distributing company	Running time
Skyline	Matthew Margeson	Michael Watson	Nicholas Wayman-Harris	Relativity Media, Rogue, Black Monday Film Services, Hydraulx Entertainment, Transmission Productions, Rat Entertainment, Brothers Strause Films	Universal Pictures	1 hr 34 mins
Beyond Skyline	Nathan Whitehead	Christopher Probst	Sean Albertson & Banner Gwin	Vertical Entertainment, Hydraulx Entertainment, m45 Productions, XYZ Films, Beijing Creastar Picture International Ltd., Arlberg Productions Limited, S&C Picture Co. Ltd., North Hollywood Films, Ingenious Media	Vertical Entertainment	1 hr 45 mins
Skylines	Ram Khatabakhsh	Alain Duplantier	Barrett Heathcote	Vertical Entertainment, Hydraulx Entertainment, Liam O'Donnell Films, XYZ Films, m45 Productions, Gifflar Films Limited, Gifflar (Patriot) Films Limited, UAB Cobaltas, Cobalt Films S.L., Ingenious Media, Lipsync Productions LLP, Artbox, Fasten Films	Vertical Entertainment	1 hr 50 mins
Skyline: Warpath	TBA	TBA	TBA	XYZ Films	TBA	TBA

== Reception ==
=== Box office and financial performance ===
Film	Box office gross			Box office ranking		Home video total	Gross income	Budget	Net income/loss	Ref.
Film	North America	Other territories	Worldwide	All-time North America	All-time worldwide	Home video total	Gross income	Budget	Net income/loss	Ref.
Skyline	$21,416,355	$46,848,618	$68,264,973	#3,510	#1,887	$11,228,846	$79,493,819	$10,000,000	$69,493,819	
Beyond Skyline	—N/a	$992,181	$992,181	#10,604	#15,419	$1,249,049	$2,241,230	$14,000,000	-$17,758,770	
Skylines	—N/a	$170,581	$170,581	#16,270	#23,294	figures not publicly available	>$170,581	≤$14,000,000	> -$13,829,419	
Totals	$21,416,355	$48,011,380	$69,427,735	x̄ #10,128	x̄ #13,533	>$12,477,895	>$81,905,630	≤$38,000,000	~$43,905,630	

=== Critical and public response ===
Film	Rotten Tomatoes	Metacritic	CinemaScore
Skyline	15% (84 reviews)	26/100 (18 reviews)	D−
Beyond Skyline	67% (21 reviews)	46/100 (8 reviews)	—N/a
Skylines	56% (27 reviews)	46/100 (4 reviews)	—N/a

== See also ==
- List of films featuring extraterrestrials
- List of science fiction action films
