= List of films featuring extraterrestrials =

This is a list of films featuring extraterrestrials, such as aliens.

Title	Year	Franchise
10 Cloverfield Lane	2016	Cloverfield
20 Million Miles to Earth	1957	
2001: A Space Odyssey	1968	Space Odyssey
2001: A Space Travesty	2000	
2010: The Year We Make Contact	1984	Space Odyssey
The 5th Wave	2016	
6 Days on Earth	2011	
Abbott and Costello Go to Mars	1953	Abbott and Costello
Abraxas, Guardian of the Universe	1990	
Absolutely Anything	2015	
The Abyss	1989	
The Adventures of Buckaroo Banzai Across the 8th Dimension	1984	
Aelita	1924	
After Earth	2013	
Airplane II: The Sequel	1982	Airplane!
Algol: Tragedy of Power	1920	
Alien	1979	Alien
Alien 2: On Earth	1980	
Alien^{3}	1992	Alien
Alien Abduction	2005	
Alien Abduction	2014	
Alien Abduction: Incident in Lake County	1998	
Alien Agent	2007	
Alien Apocalypse	2005	
Alien Arsenal	1999	
Alien: Covenant	2017	Alien
The Alien Factor	1978	
Alien Hunter	2003	
Alien Intruder	1993	
Alien Invasion Arizona	2005	
Alien Nation	1988	Alien Nation
Alien Origin	2012	
Alien Raiders	2008	
Alien Resurrection	1997	Alien
Alien: Romulus	2024	Alien
Alien Siege	2005	
Alien Trespass	2009	
Aliens	1986	Alien
Aliens Ate My Homework	2018	
Aliens in the Attic	2009	
Aliens vs. Avatars	2011	
Alien vs. Predator	2004	Alien vs. Predator
Aliens vs. Predator: Requiem	2007	Alien vs. Predator
Alien vs Ninja	2010	
All-Star Superman	2011	DC - Superman
Allegro Non Troppo	1976	
Almost Human	2013	
Altered	2006	
Amazon Women on the Moon	1987	
The Andromeda Strain	1971	
The Angry Red Planet	1959	
Angry Video Game Nerd: The Movie	2014	
Annihilation	2018	
Apollo 18	2011	
Area 51	2015	
Area Q	2011	
Arena	1989	
The Arrival	1996	Arrival
Arrival	2016	
Arrival II	1998	Arrival
The Astronaut's Wife	1999	
Los astronautas	1964	
Atom Man vs. Superman (serial)	1950	DC - Superman
Attack the Block	2011	
Attack of the 50 Foot Woman	1958	Attack of the 50 Foot Woman
Attack of the 50 Ft. Woman (TV)	1993	Attack of the 50 Foot Woman
Attraction	2017	
Avatar	2009	Avatar
Avatar: The Way of Water	2022	Avatar
The Avengers	2012	Marvel Cinematic Universe
Avengers: Age of Ultron	2015	Marvel Cinematic Universe
Avengers: Endgame	2019	Marvel Cinematic Universe
Avengers: Infinity War	2018	Marvel Cinematic Universe
AVH: Alien vs. Hunter	2007	
Ayalaan	2024	Ayalaan
Babylon 5: A Call to Arms (TV)	1999	
Babylon 5: The Gathering (TV)	1993	
Babylon 5: In the Beginning (TV)	1998	
Babylon 5: The Legend of the Rangers	2002	
Babylon 5: The Lost Tales (TV)	2007	
Babylon 5: The River of Souls (TV)	1998	
Babylon 5: Thirdspace (TV)	1998	
Bad Taste	1987	
Barbarella	1968	
Batman v Superman: Dawn of Justice	2016	DC Extended Universe
Batteries Not Included	1988	
Battle Beyond the Stars	1980	
Battle for Terra	2007	
Battle in Outer Space	1959	Godzilla
Battle: Los Angeles	2011	
Battlefield Earth	2001	
Battleship	2012	
Batman: Hush	2019	DC Animated Movie Universe
Ben 10: Alien Swarm	2009	Ben 10
Ben 10: Destroy All Aliens	2012	Ben 10
Ben 10: Race Against Time	2007	Ben 10
Beware! The Blob	1972	The Blob
Beyond Skyline	2017	Skyline
Beyond Witch Mountain	1982	Witch Mountain
Bill & Ted's Bogus Journey	1991	Bill & Ted
Black Antenna	2019	
The Blob	1958	The Blob
The Blob	1988	The Blob
Bloodbath at the House of Death	1983	
Bloodsuckers from Outer Space	1984	
Body Snatchers	1993	Body Snatchers
The Borrower	1991	
The Box	2009	Based on The Twilight Zone
The Brain	1988	
The Brain from Planet Arous	1957	
Breeders	1986	
Brightburn	2019	
The Brother from Another Planet	1984	
Buck Rogers (serial)	1939	Buck Rogers
Bugonia	2025	
Buzz Lightyear of Star Command: The Adventure Begins	2000	Toy Story
The Cabbage Soup	1981	
Can of Worms	1999	
The Cape Canaveral Monsters	1960	
Captain Marvel	2019	Marvel Cinematic Universe
Captain Video: Master of the Stratosphere (serial)	1951	Captain Video and His Video Rangers
Captive State	2019	
Caravan of Courage: An Ewok Adventure	1984	Star Wars
The Cat	1992	
The Cat from Outer Space	1978	
Cat-Women of the Moon	1953	
Ché OVNI	1968	
Chicken Little	2005	
Children of the Damned	1964	...of the Damned
Christmas on Mars	2008	
The Chronicles of Riddick	2004	The Chronicles of Riddick
Clara	2018	
CJ7	2008	
Close Encounters of the Third Kind	1977	
Cloverfield	2008	Cloverfield
The Cloverfield Paradox	2018	Cloverfield
Cocoon	1985	Cocoon
Cocoon: The Return	1988	Cocoon
Color Out of Space	2019	
Commando Cody: Sky Marshal of the Universe (serial)	1953	Commando Cody
Communion	1989	
Coneheads	1993	
Contact	1997	
Cowboys & Aliens	2011	
Creature	1985	
The Creature Wasn't Nice	1983	
The Creeping Terror	1964	
Creepshow	1982	
Critters	1986	Critters
Critters 2: The Main Course	1988	Critters
Critters 3	1991	Critters
Critters 4	1992	Critters
Critters Attack!	2019	Critters
The Curse	1987	
Daleks' Invasion Earth 2150 A.D.	1966	Doctor Who
The Dark	1979	
Dark City	1998	
The Dark Crystal	1982	
Dark Skies	2013	
Dark Star	1974	
Dark Universe	1993	
Darkening Sky	2010	
The Darkest Hour	2011	
The Day the Earth Stood Still	1951	
The Day the Earth Stood Still	2008	The Day the Earth Stood Still
The Day the Earth Stopped	2008	
The Day Mars Invaded Earth	1963	
The Day of the Triffids	1962	
The Day the World Ended	2001	
The Deadly Spawn	1983	
Deadpool 2	2018	Marvel - X-Men
The Death of Superman	2018	DC Animated Movie Universe
Decoys	2004	Decoys
Decoys 2: Alien Seduction	2007	Decoys
Destroy All Monsters	1968	Godzilla
Devil Girl from Mars	1954	
Disclosure Day	2026	
District 9	2009	
Doctor Strange	2016	Marvel Cinematic Universe
Doctor Who	1996	Doctor Who
Don't Look Up	2021	
Doom	2005	
Doraemon: Nobita and the Animal Planet	1990	Doraemon
Doraemon: Nobita and the Galaxy Super-express	1996	Doraemon
Doraemon: Nobita and the Spiral City	1997	Doraemon
Doraemon: Nobita and the Tin Labyrinth	1993	Doraemon
Doraemon: Nobita in the Robot Kingdom	2002	Doraemon
Doraemon: Nobita's Earth Symphony	2024	Doraemon
Doraemon: Nobita's Great Battle of the Mermaid King	2010	Doraemon
Doraemon: Nobita's Little Star Wars	1985	Doraemon
Doraemon: Nobita's Little Star Wars 2021	2022	Doraemon
Doraemon: Nobita's Space Heroes	2015	Doraemon
Doraemon: The New Record of Nobita's Spaceblazer	2009	Doraemon
Doraemon: The Records of Nobita, Spaceblazer	1981	Doraemon
Dot in Space	1994	Dot and the Kangaroo
Dr. Alien	1989	
Dr. Who and the Daleks	1965	Doctor Who
Dreamcatcher	2003	
Dragonball Evolution	2009	
Dude, Where's My Car?	2000	
Dune	1984	Dune
Dune: Part One	2021	Dune
Dune: Part Two	2024	Dune
E.T. the Extra-Terrestrial	1982	
Earth Girls Are Easy	1988	
Earth to Echo	2014	
Earth vs. the Flying Saucers	1956	
Edge of Tomorrow	2014	
Elio	2025	
Ender's Game	2013	
Enemy Mine	1985	
Escape from Planet Earth	2013	
Escape to Witch Mountain	1975	Witch Mountain
Disney's Escape to Witch Mountain	1995	Witch Mountain
Eternals	2021	
Europa Report	2013	
Evangelion: 1.0 You Are (Not) Alone	2007	Neon Genesis Evangelion
Evangelion: 2.0 You Can (Not) Advance	2009	Neon Genesis Evangelion
Evangelion: 3.0 You Can (Not) Redo	2012	Neon Genesis Evangelion
Evangelion: 3.0+1.0 Thrice Upon a Time	2021	Neon Genesis Evangelion
Evil Aliens	2005	
Evolution	2001	
Ewoks: The Battle for Endor	1985	Star Wars
Excursion to the Moon	1908	
Explorers	1985	
Extinction	2018	
Extraterrestrial	2011	
Extraterrestrial	2014	
The Eye Creatures	1965	
The Faculty	1998	
Fantastic Four: Rise of the Silver Surfer	2007	Marvel - Fantastic Four
Fantastic Planet	1973	
Feeders	1996	
The Fifth Element	1997	
Fire in the Sky	1993	
Fire Maidens from Outer Space	1956	
First Men in the Moon	1964	The First Men in the Moon
First Spaceship on Venus	1962	
Flash Gordon (serial)	1936	Flash Gordon
Flash Gordon	1980	Flash Gordon
Flash Gordon Conquers the Universe (serial)	1940	Flash Gordon
Flash Gordon's Trip to Mars (serial)	1938	Flash Gordon
Flesh Gordon	1974	Flesh Gordon
Flesh Gordon Meets the Cosmic Cheerleaders	1989	Flesh Gordon
Flight of the Navigator	1986	
Flight to Mars	1950	
The Flintstones in Viva Rock Vegas	2000	The Flintstones
Flying Disc Man from Mars (serial)	1950	
Flying Saucer Rock'n'Roll	1997	
Forbidden Planet	1956	
Forbidden World	1982	
The Forgotten	2004	
The Fourth Kind	2009	
Frankenstein Island	1981	Frankenstein
Frankenstein Meets the Space Monster	1965	Frankenstein
Freaks of Nature	2015	
Futurama: The Beast with a Billion Backs (TV)	2008	Futurama
Futurama: Bender's Big Score (TV)	2007	Futurama
Galaxy Invader	1985	
Galaxy of Terror	1981	
Galaxy Quest	1999	
Gamera: Super Monster	1980	Gamera
Gamera vs. Viras	1968	Gamera
Gamera vs. Zigra	1971	Gamera
The Gendarme and the Extra-Terrestrials	1979	Le gendarme series
Ghidorah, the Three-Headed Monster	1964	Godzilla
Ghosts of Mars	2001	
The Giant Spider Invasion	1975	
God Told Me To	1976	
Godzilla 2000	1999	Godzilla
Godzilla: City on the Edge of Battle	2018	Godzilla
Godzilla: Final Wars	2004	Godzilla
Godzilla: King of the Monsters	2019	MonsterVerse
Godzilla: The Planet Eater	2018	Godzilla
Godzilla: Planet of the Monsters	2017	Godzilla
Godzilla vs. Destoroyah	1995	Godzilla
Godzilla vs. Gigan	1972	Godzilla
Godzilla vs. Hedorah	1971	Godzilla
Godzilla vs. Mechagodzilla	1974	Godzilla
Godzilla vs. SpaceGodzilla	1994	Godzilla
Goke, Body Snatcher from Hell	1968	One-shot
Good Boy!	2003	
Grabbers	2012	
The Great Wall	2016	
Green Lantern	2011	DC - Green Lantern
Green Lantern: First Flight	2014	DC - Green Lantern
The Green Slime	1968	
Guardians of the Galaxy	2014	Marvel Cinematic Universe
Guardians of the Galaxy Vol. 2	2017	Marvel Cinematic Universe
Guardians of the Galaxy Vol. 3	2023	Marvel Cinematic Universe
Gunbuster vs Diebuster Aim for the Top! The GATTAI!! Movie	2006	Gunbuster
H.G. Wells' The War of the Worlds	2005	The War of the Worlds
H.G. Wells' War of the Worlds	2005	The War of the Worlds
Hangar 18	1980	
HappinessCharge PreCure! the Movie: The Ballerina of the Land of Dolls	2014	Pretty Cure
Hardware Wars	1978	
Have Rocket, Will Travel	1959	The Three Stooges
Heavy Metal	1981	Heavy Metal
Heavy Metal 2000	2000	Heavy Metal
The Hidden	1987	Hidden
The Hidden II	1993	Hidden Hidden 2015
High Plains Invaders (TV)	2009	
Highlander II: The Quickening	1991	Highlander
The Hitchhiker's Guide to the Galaxy	2005	
Hobgoblins	1988	
Home	2015	
Honeymoon	2014	
Horror Express	1972	
The Host	2013	
How to Talk to Girls at Parties	2018	
Howard the Duck	1986	Marvel - Howard
I Am Number Four	2011	
I Come in Peace	1990	
I Married a Monster from Outer Space	1958	
I Was a Zombie for the F.B.I.	1982	
Illegal Aliens	2007	
Impostor	2002	
Independence Day	1996	Independence Day
Independence Day: Resurgence	2016	Independence Day
Indiana Jones and the Kingdom of the Crystal Skull	2008	Indiana Jones
Infected (TV)	2008	
Inseminoid	1981	
Interstella 5555: The 5tory of the 5ecret 5tar 5ystem	2003	
Invader Zim: Enter the Florpus	2019	Invader Zim
Invaders from Mars	1953	Invaders from Mars
Invaders from Mars	1986	Invaders from Mars
Invasion	1966	
The Invasion	2007	Body Snatchers
Invasion from Inner Earth	1974	
Invasion of Astro-Monster	1965	Godzilla
Invasion of the Body Snatchers	1956	Body Snatchers
Invasion of the Body Snatchers	1978	
Invasion of the Neptune Men	1961	
Invasion of the Saucer Men	1957	
Invasion of the Star Creatures	1962	
Invisible Invaders	1959	
The Iron Giant	1999	
Iron Invader	2011	
It Came from Outer Space	1953	
It: Chapter One	2017	Stephen King's It
It Chapter Two	2019	Stephen King's It
It Conquered the World	1956	
It! The Terror from Beyond Space	1958	
Jetsons: The Movie	1990	Jetsons
Jimmy Neutron: Boy Genius	2001	Jimmy Neutron
Jiu Jitsu	2020	
John Carter	2012	Barsoom
Joker	2012	
Journey to the Seventh Planet	1962	
Jules	2023	
Jupiter Ascending	2015	
Just Imagine	1930	
Justice League	2017	DC Extended Universe
Justice League: Crisis on Two Earths	2010	DC
Justice League Dark	2017	DC Animated Movie Universe
Justice League Dark: Apokolips War	2020	DC Animated Movie Universe
Justice League: Doom	2012	DC
Justice League: The Flashpoint Paradox	2011	DC Animated Movie Universe
Justice League: The New Frontier	2008	DC
Justice League: Throne of Atlantis	2011	DC Animated Movie Universe
Justice League vs. the Fatal Five	2019	DC
Justice League: War	2014	DC Animated Movie Universe
Kalai Arasi	1963	
Kids vs. Aliens	2022	V/H/S
Killer Klowns from Outer Space	1988	
Killers from Space	1954	
Kin-dza-dza!	1986	
Knowing	2009	
Koi... Mil Gaya	2003	Krrish
Kronos	1957	
Krrish	2006	Krrish
Krrish 3	2013	Krrish
Krull	1983	
Landscape with Invisible Hand	2023	
Laserblast	1978	
The Last Starfighter	1984	
The Lego Movie 2: The Second Part	2019	The Lego Movie (Lego)
Leroy & Stitch	2006	Lilo & Stitch
Life	2017	
Lifeforce	1985	
Lifted	2006	
Lightyear	2022	Toy Story
Lilo & Stitch	2002	Lilo & Stitch
Lilo & Stitch	2025	Lilo & Stitch
Lilo & Stitch 2: Stitch Has a Glitch	2005	Lilo & Stitch
Liquid Sky	1982	
The Last Days on Mars	2013	
The Little Shop of Horrors	1960	The Little Shop of Horrors
Little Shop of Horrors	1986	The Little Shop of Horrors
Looney Tunes: Back in Action	2003	Looney Tunes
Lost in Space	1998	Lost in Space
The Lost Skeleton of Cadavra	2001	
The Love War (TV)	1970	
Mac and Me	1988	
The Man from Planet X	1951	
Man of Steel	2013	DC Extended Universe
The Man Who Fell to Earth	1976	
The Man Who Wasn't There	2001	
Mars Attacks!	1996	
Mars Needs Moms	2011	
Mars Needs Women (TV)	1967	
Martians Go Home	1990	
Max Steel	2016	Max Steel
Meatball Machine	2005	
Meatballs Part II	1984	Meatballs
Meet Dave	2008	
Megamind	2010	
Men in Black	1997	Men in Black
Men in Black II	2002	Men in Black
Men in Black 3	2012	Men in Black
Men in Black: International	2019	Men in Black
Meow	2017	
A Message from Mars	1913	
Metamorphosis: The Alien Factor	1990	
Mighty Morphin Power Rangers: The Movie	1995	Power Rangers
The Miracle of P. Tinto	1998	
Missile to the Moon	1958	
Mission to Mars	2000	
Mom and Dad Save the World	1992	
Monster X Strikes Back: Attack the G8 Summit	2008	
Monsters	2010	Monsters
Monsters: Dark Continent	2014	Monsters
Monsters vs. Aliens	2009	
Los Monstruos del Terror	1970	Waldemar Daninsky series
Monty Python's Life of Brian	1979	Monty Python
Moonfall	2022	
Morons from Outer Space	1985	
Münchhausen	1943	Baron Munchausen
Muppets from Space	1999	Muppets
Mutant Swinger from Mars	2009	
My Favorite Martian	1999	
My Stepmother Is an Alien	1988	
The Mysterians	1957	Godzilla
New Mutants	2020	Marvel - X-Men
Night Caller from Outer Space	1966	
Night of the Big Heat	1967	
Night of the Blood Beast	1958	
Night of the Creeps	1986	
Night Skies	2007	
Nightbeast	1982	
No One Will Save You	2023	
Nope	2022	
Not of This Earth	1957	Not of This Earth
Not of This Earth	1988	Not of This Earth
Nowhere	1997	
Nude on the Moon	1961	
Nukie	1987	
Oblivion	1994	
Oblivion	2013	
Occupation	2018	
Ōgon Bat	1966	
Outlander	2008	Beowulf
Pacific Rim	2013	Pacific Rim
Pacific Rim Uprising	2018	Pacific Rim
Pajama Party	1964	Beach Party
Pandorum	2009	
Parasyte: Part 1	2014	Parasyte
Parasyte: Part 2	2015	Parasyte
Paul	2011	
Pee-wee's Big Holiday	2016	Pee-wee Herman
PG: Psycho Goreman	2020	
Phantom from Space	1953	
Phineas and Ferb the Movie: Candace Against the Universe	2020	Phineas and Ferb
Phoenix Forgotten	2017	
The Phoenix Incident	2015	
Pinocchio in Outer Space	1965	
Pitch Black	2000	The Chronicles of Riddick
Pixels	2015	
Plan 9 from Outer Space	1959	
Plan 10 from Outer Space	1994	
Planet 51	2009	
Planet of the Apes	2001	Planet of the Apes
Planet of the Vampires	1965	
Planeta Bur	1962	
The Pod People	1983	
Power Rangers	2017	Power Rangers
Predator	1987	Predator
The Predator	2018	Predator
Predator 2	1990	Predator
Predator: Badlands	2025	
Predator: Killer of Killers	2025	
Predators	2010	Predator
Prey	2022	Predator
Princess of Mars	2009	Barsoom
Progeny	1999	
Project ALF	1996	ALF
Project Hail Mary	2026	
Prometheus	2012	Alien
Proximity	2020	
The Puppet Masters	1994	
The Purple Monster Strikes (serial)	1945	
The Quatermass Xperiment	1955	Quatermass
Quatermass 2	1957	Quatermass
Quatermass and the Pit	1967	Quatermass
Queen of Blood	1966	
Queen of Outer Space	1958	
A Quiet Place	2018	A Quiet Place
A Quiet Place: Day One	2024	A Quiet Place
A Quiet Place Part II	2021	A Quiet Place
Race to Witch Mountain	2009	Witch Mountain
Radar Men from the Moon (serial)	1952	Commando Cody
Ratchet & Clank	2016	
Real Men	1987	
Rebel Moon – Part One: A Child of Fire	2023	Rebel Moon
Rebel Moon – Part Two: The Scargiver	2024	Rebel Moon
The Recall	2017	
Red Planet	2000	
Reign of the Supermen	2019	DC Animated Movie Universe
Repo Man	1984	
Return from Witch Mountain	1978	Witch Mountain
Returner	2002	
Riddick	2013	The Chronicles of Riddick
Rise of the Teenage Mutant Ninja Turtles: The Movie	2022	Teenage Mutant Ninja Turtles
Robinson Crusoe on Mars	1964	Robinson Crusoe
Robot Monster	1953	
Rocketship X-M	1950	
The Rocky Horror Picture Show	1975	The Rocky Horror Picture Show
The Rocky Horror Picture Show: Let's Do the Time Warp Again	2016	The Rocky Horror Picture Show
Rogue One: A Star Wars Story	2016	Star Wars
Santa Claus Conquers the Martians	1964	
Save the Green Planet!	2003	
Scary Movie 3	2003	Scary Movie
Scary Movie 4	2006	Scary Movie
Scooby-Doo	2002	Scooby-Doo
Scooby-Doo and the Alien Invaders	2000	Scooby-Doo
Seedpeople	1992	
The Shadow Men	1998	
Shazam!	2019	DC Extended Universe
A Shaun the Sheep Movie: Farmageddon	2019	Wallace and Gromit
Shin Ultraman	2022	Ultraman
The Signal	2014	
Signs	2002	
Silent Warnings	2003	
Skyline	2010	Skyline
Skyline Radial	2024	Skyline
Skylines	2020	Skyline
Slither	2006	
Solaris (TV)	1972	
Solaris	2002	
Solo: A Star Wars Story	2018	Star Wars
Sonic the Hedgehog	2020	Sonic the Hedgehog
Sonic the Hedgehog 2	2022	Sonic the Hedgehog
Space Invasion of Lapland	1959	
Space Jam	1996	Looney Tunes
Spaceman	2024	
Space Probe Taurus	1965	
Space Travelers: The Animation	2000	
Spaceballs	1987	
Spaced Invaders	1990	
Spacehunter: Adventures in the Forbidden Zone	1983	
Species	1995	Species
Species II	1998	Species
Species III	2004	Species
Species – The Awakening	2007	Species
Spice World	1997	
Spider-Man: Far From Home	2019	Marvel Cinematic Universe
Spider-Man 3	2007	Marvel - Spider-Man
Star Crystal	1986	
Starchaser: The Legend of Orin	1985	
Star Odyssey	1978	
Star Trek	2009	Star Trek
Star Trek II: The Wrath of Khan	1982	Star Trek
Star Trek III: The Search for Spock	1984	Star Trek
Star Trek IV: The Voyage Home	1986	Star Trek
Star Trek V: The Final Frontier	1989	Star Trek
Star Trek VI: The Undiscovered Country	1991	Star Trek
Star Trek Beyond	2016	Star Trek
Star Trek: First Contact	1996	Star Trek
Star Trek Generations	1994	Star Trek
Star Trek: Insurrection	1998	Star Trek
Star Trek Into Darkness	2013	Star Trek
Star Trek: The Motion Picture	1979	Star Trek
Star Trek: Nemesis	2002	Star Trek
Star Wars: The Clone Wars	2008	Star Wars
Star Wars: Episode I – The Phantom Menace	1999	Star Wars
Star Wars: Episode II – Attack of the Clones	2002	Star Wars
Star Wars: Episode III – Revenge of the Sith	2005	Star Wars
Star Wars: Episode IV - A New Hope	1977	Star Wars
Star Wars: Episode V - The Empire Strikes Back	1980	Star Wars
Star Wars: Episode VI - Return of the Jedi	1983	Star Wars
Star Wars: Episode VII - The Force Awakens	2015	Star Wars
Star Wars: Episode VIII - The Last Jedi	2017	Star Wars
Star Wars: Episode IX - The Rise of Skywalker	2019	Star Wars
Star Wars Holiday Special (TV)	1978	Star Wars
Starcrash	1978	
Stargate	1994	Stargate
Stargate: Continuum	2008	Stargate
Stargate: The Ark of Truth	2008	Stargate
Starman	1984	
Starship Invasions	1977	
Starship Troopers	1997	Starship Troopers
Starship Troopers 2: Hero of the Federation	2004	Starship Troopers
Starship Troopers 3: Marauder	2008	Starship Troopers
Starship Troopers: Invasion	2012	Starship Troopers
Starship Troopers: Traitor of Mars	2017	Starship Troopers
Stepsister from Planet Weird	2000	
Steven Universe: The Movie	2019	
Stitch! The Movie	2003	Lilo & Stitch
Stranded	1987	
Strange Invaders	1983	
Strange World	2022	
Suburban Commando	1991	
The Suicide Squad	2021	DC Extended Universe
Super 8	2011	
Super Deluxe (film)	2019	
Supergirl	1984	DC - Superman
Superlópez	2018	
Superman (serial)	1948	DC - Superman
Superman	1978	DC - Superman
Superman	2025	DC - DC Universe
Superman II	1980	DC - Superman
Superman III	1983	DC - Superman
Superman IV: The Quest for Peace	1987	DC - Superman
Superman and the Mole Men	1951	DC - Superman
Superman/Batman: Apocalypse	2010	DC - Superman
Superman/Batman: Public Enemies	2009	DC - Superman
Superman: Brainiac Attacks	2006	DC - Superman
Superman: Doomsday	2007	
Superman: Man of Tomorrow	2020	DC - Superman
Superman: Red Son	2020	DC - Superman
Superman Returns	2006	DC - Superman
Superman: Unbound	2013	DC - Superman
Superman vs. The Elite	2012	DC - Superman
Supersonic Man	1979	
Tales of Halloween	2015	One-shot
Target Earth	1954	
Teen Titans Go! To the Movies	2018	Teen Titans Go!
Teenage Mutant Ninja Turtles: Out of the Shadows	2016	Teenage Mutant Ninja Turtles
Teenagers from Outer Space	1959	
Terror of Mechagodzilla	1975	Godzilla
The Terrornauts	1967	
TerrorVision	1987	
They Came from Beyond Space	1967	
They Live	1988	
The Thing	1982	Who Goes There?
The Thing	2011	Who Goes There?
The Thing from Another World	1951	Who Goes There?
This Island Earth	1955	
Thor	2011	Marvel Cinematic Universe
Thor: The Dark World	2013	Marvel Cinematic Universe
Thor: Love and Thunder	2022	Marvel Cinematic Universe
Thor: Ragnarok	2017	Marvel Cinematic Universe
The Three Stooges in Orbit	1962	The Three Stooges
Thunderbirds Are Go	1966	Thunderbirds
Titan A.E.	2000	
Tom and Jerry: Blast Off to Mars	2005	Tom and Jerry
The Tomorrow War	2021	
Too Many Cooks	2014	
Toomorrow	1970	
Top of the Food Chain	1999	
Transformers	2007	Transformers
Transformers: Age of Extinction	2014	Transformers
Transformers: Bumblebee	2018	Transformers
Transformers: Dark of the Moon	2011	Transformers
Transformers: The Last Knight	2017	Transformers
The Transformers: The Movie	1986	Transformers: The Animated Series
Transformers One	2024	Transformers
Transformers: Revenge of the Fallen	2009	Transformers
Transformers: Rise of the Beasts	2023	Transformers
Transmorphers	2007	Transmorphers
Transmorphers: Fall of Man	2009	Transmorphers
Treasure Planet	2002	One-Shot
A Trip to Mars (Himmelskibet)	1918	
A Trip to the Moon	1902	From the Earth to the Moon
The Trollenberg Terror	1958	
Tropico	2013	
Turbo: A Power Rangers Movie	1997	Power Rangers
U.F.O.	1993	
U.F.O.	2012	
UFO Abduction	1989	
The UFO Incident	1975	
UHF	1989	
Ultimate Avengers - The Movie	2006	Marvel - Animated
Unaware	2013	
Under the Mountain	2009	
Under the Skin	2013	
V/H/S	2012	V/H/S
V/H/S/2	2013	V/H/S
V/H/S: Viral	2014	V/H/S
V/H/S/85	2023	V/H/S
V/H/S/Beyond	2024	V/H/S
Valerian and the City of a Thousand Planets	2017	
Vampirella	1996	
The Vast of Night	2019	
Venom	2018	Marvel - Sony's Spider-Man Universe
Venom: Let There Be Carnage	2021	Marvel - Sony's Spider-Man Universe
Village of the Damned	1960	...of the Damned
Village of the Damned	1995	...of the Damned
Virus	1999	
Visit to a Small Planet	1960	
The Visitor	1979	
Voyage of the Rock Aliens	1984	
Voyage to the Planet of Prehistoric Women	1968	
Voyage to the Prehistoric Planet	1965	
War of the Planets	1966	
The War of the Worlds	1953	The War of the Worlds
War of the Worlds	2005	The War of the Worlds
War of the Worlds 2: The Next Wave	2008	The War of the Worlds
War of the Worlds: Goliath	2012	The War of the Worlds
War of the Worlds: The True Story	2012	The War of the Worlds
Warlords of Atlantis	1978	
Warning from Space	1956	
Gaganachari	2024	
The Watch	2012	
Wavelength	1983	
Welcome to the Space Show	2010	
What on Earth!	1966	
What Planet Are You From?	2000	
When the Man in the Moon Seeks a Wife	1908	
The Whisperer in Darkness	2011	
Within the Rock	1996	
Without Warning	1980	
The Wizard of Mars	1965	
The World's End	2013	
The X from Outer Space	1967	
The X-Files: Fight the Future	1998	The X-Files
The X-Files: I Want to Believe	2008	The X-Files
X-Men: Dark Phoenix	2019	Marvel - X-Men
Xtro	1982	Xtro
Xtro II: The Second Encounter	1991	Xtro
Xtro 3: Watch the Skies	1995	Xtro
Zack Snyder's Justice League	2021	DC Extended Universe
Zarkorr! The Invader	1995	
Zathura: A Space Adventure	2005	Jumanji
Zenon: The Zequel	2001	
Zeta One	1969	
Zombies of the Stratosphere	1952	
Zone Troopers	1985	
Zontar, the Thing from Venus	1966	

== See also ==
- Lists of fictional extraterrestrials
- UFOs in fiction
