= Momentum Pictures =

Former British independent motion picture distributor

Alliance Films (UK) Limited
- Trade name: Momentum Pictures
- Formerly: Alliance - Electric Releasing Limited (1997); Alliance Electric Releasing Limited (1997); Alliance Releasing Limited (1997–2001); Alliance Atlantis Releasing Limited (2001–2010)
- Industry: Film distribution
- Founded: 1997; 29 years ago
- Defunct: 2013; 13 years ago
- Fate: Absorbed by Entertainment One UK
- Successors: Entertainment One UK
- Headquarters: 45 Mortimer Street, London, England, United Kingdom
- Products: Motion pictures
- Parent: Alliance Communications (1997–1998); Alliance Atlantis Communications (1998–2007); Alliance Films (2007–2013)
- Website: momentumpictures.net

Alliance Films (UK) Limited, trading as Momentum Pictures, was a British film distributor owned by Alliance Films and operated as their UK division. It was one of the leading independent distributors of films in the UK and Ireland until being folded into Entertainment One UK in 2013 following the purchase of Alliance Films by the company.

Entertainment One later revived the brand in 2015 to release independent films in North America and other international territories. This incarnation of the distributor would be folded in 2023 after the sale of Entertainment One to Lionsgate.

== History ==
In February 1997, Canadian distributor Alliance Communications announced that they would enter the UK film market by forming a joint-venture with independent distributor Electric Pictures which was originally called Alliance Releasing UK.

In August 1999, German distributor Kinowelt announced that they had taken a 50% stake in the UK distribution company Alliance Atlantis Releasing from Alliance Atlantis. By May 2000, the venture Alliance Atlantis Releasing was renamed as Momentum Pictures. Kinowelt attempted to purchase AAL's stake in Momentum Pictures as late as 2001, but were unable to do so due to their financial issues. Eventually, the joint-venture partnership would fall through between companies, and Momentum reverted to being a fully owned subsidiary of AAL.

In 2003, AAL announced plans to spin off the company and its own Canadian theatrical division as an income fund business, entitled Motion Picture Distribution LP, of which they would hold a majority interest. The deal closed a month later in October.

After the breakup of Alliance Atlantis in 2007, Motion Picture Distribution LP, including Momentum, was sold to EdgeStone Capital Partners with Goldman Sachs Alternatives keeping the other stake. In September, the business became known as Alliance Films.

On May 28, 2012, Entertainment One announced that they would purchase Alliance Films, which would be completed on January 9, 2013. Afterwards, Momentum Pictures was folded into Entertainment One's UK theatrical operations. Despite this, the company remains as a dormant business to this day, currently being under Lionsgate UK ownership.

=== Revival ===
Momentum Pictures
- Type: Public
- Industry: Film distribution
- Founded: 2015; 11 years ago
- Defunct: 2023; 3 years ago
- Fate: Absorbed by Entertainment One
- Successors: Studio: eOne Films; Library: Lionsgate
- Headquarters: 134 Peter Street, Toronto, Ontario, Canada
- Products: Motion pictures
- Parent: Entertainment One (2015–2023)
- Website: momentumpictures.net

In September 2015, Entertainment One announced that it would revive the Momentum Pictures brand as a label used for "films for digital and ancillary exploitation on a global basis." The label then signed a distribution agreement with Orion Pictures to release their movies in North America and select international territories.

== Theatrical releases ==
Pre-2015 release dates are United Kingdom only.

=== 2023 ===
- War Pony (28 July)
- Maximum Truth (23 June)
- Wildflower (17 March)
- Palm Trees and Power Lines (3 March)
- Swallowed (14 February)

=== 2022 ===
- Soft & Quiet (4 November)
- To Leslie (7 October)
- Neon Lights (12 July)
- Dashcam (3 June)
- All My Puny Sorrows (3 May)

=== 2021 ===
- Witch Hunt (1 October)
- Port Authority (28 May)

=== 2020 ===
- Black Bear (4 December)
- The Devil Has a Name (16 October)
- The 2nd (1 September)
- Stage Mother (21 August)
- Escape from Pretoria (6 March)
- Disturbing the Peace (17 January)

=== 2019 ===
- Dude Perfect: Trickshots (17 December)
- The Death & Life of John F. Donovan (13 December)
- A Million Little Pieces (6 December)
- Farming (25 October)
- Bloodline (20 September)
- Haunt (13 September)
- Nekrotronic (9 August)
- Finding Steve McQueen (15 March)
- Among the Shadows (5 March)

=== 2018 ===
- Asher (7 December)
- I Think We're Alone Now (14 September)
- Boarding School (31 August)
- 211 (8 June)
- The Last Witness (29 May)
- Steven Tyler: Out on a Limb (15 May)
- Beast of Burden (23 February)
- Half Magic (23 February)
- Looking Glass (16 February)
- The Clapper (26 January)
- Mom and Dad (19 January)
- Stratton (5 January)

=== 2017 ===
- The Girl Who Invented Kissing (12 December)
- Jungle (20 October)
- 6 Below: Miracle on the Mountain (13 October)
- Goon: Last of the Enforcers (1 September)
- Fun Mom Dinner (4 August)
- The Gracefield Incident (21 July)
- Manhattan Undying (6 June)
- The Shadow Effect (2 May)
- Voice from the Stone (28 April)
- Johnny Frank Garrett's Last Word (14 March)
- Brimstone (10 March)
- Devil in the Dark (7 March)
- The Institute (3 March)
- In Dubious Battle (17 February)
- Blowtorch (7 February)
- Wheeler (3 February)
- Bad Kids of Crestview Academy (13 January)
- The Bronx Bull (6 January)
- Zombie Massacre 2: Reich of the Dead (3 January)

=== 2016 ===
- Abattoir (9 December)
- Oddball (6 December)
- Run the Tide (2 December)
- Pocket Listing (1 December)
- My Dead Boyfriend (3 November)
- The Possession Experiment (27 October)
- Jack Goes Home (14 October)
- The Late Bloomer (7 October)
- Milton's Secret (30 September)
- Ithaca (9 September)
- The Perfect Weapon (9 September)
- Rampage: President Down (6 September)
- Quitters (22 July)
- Outlaws and Angels (15 July)
- Septembers of Shiraz (24 June)
- Andron (3 June)
- Hard Sell (20 May)
- The Asian Connection (13 May)
- Bling (6 May)
- The Offering (6 May)
- The Program (18 March)
- Ava's Possessions (4 March)
- Forsaken (19 February)
- All Roads Lead to Rome (5 February)
- Intruders (15 January)
- The Benefactor (15 January)
- Diablo (8 January)
- Indigenous (5 January)

=== 2015 ===
- Imba Means Sing (4 December)
- The Wannabe (4 December)
- Lost in the Sun (5 November)
- Yakuza Apocalypse (9 October)
- The Night Crew (10 August)
- Elephant Song (13 July)
- Wild Horses (5 June)

=== 2013 ===
- Snitch (21 June)
- Populaire (31 May)
- Dead Man Down (3 May)
- 21 & Over (3 May)
- The Lords of Salem (19 April)
- Dark Skies (3 April)
- In the House (29 March)
- Welcome to the Punch (15 March)
- Robot & Frank (8 March)
- The Bay (1 March)
- Safe Haven (1 March)
- Antiviral (1 February)
- Movie 43 (25 January)
- V/H/S (18 January)
- Quartet (1 January)

=== 2012 ===
- Dead Europe (14 December)
- Seven Psychopaths (5 December)
- Gambit (21 November)
- We Are the Night (26 October)
- Hit & Run (12 October)
- Sinister (5 October)
- The Babymakers (28 September)
- House at the End of the Street (21 September)
- Hope Springs (14 September)
- Anton Corbijn: Inside Out (14 September)
- Lawless (7 September)
- Tim and Eric's Billion Dollar Movie (24 August)
- The Players (6 July)
- The Rise and Fall of a White Collar Hooligan (22 June)
- The Squad (15 June)
- Red Lights (15 June)
- Red Tails (6 June)
- The Raid: Redemption (18 May)
- Café de Flore (11 May)
- Safe (4 May)
- The Divide (20 April)
- Headhunters (6 April)
- Act of Valour (23 March)
- The Woman in Black (10 February)
- Haywire (18 January)
- Shame (13 January)

=== 2011 ===
- Justice (18 November)
- Amélie (re-release) (14 October)
- Trollhunter (9 September)
- Weekender (2 September)
- Hobo with a Shotgun (15 July)
- Red Hill (13 May)
- Insidious (29 April)
- Limitless (23 March)
- Chalet Girl (16 March)
- The Fighter (2 February)
- The Mechanic (28 January)
- Season of the Witch (7 January)
- The King's Speech (7 January)

=== 2010 ===
- Catfish (17 December)
- The Girl Who Kicked the Hornets' Nest (26 November)
- Skyline (12 November)
- Another Year (5 November)
- Frozen (24 September)
- The Horde (17 September)
- Tamara Drewe (10 September)
- The Girl Who Played with Fire (27 August)
- The Rebound (23 July)
- Brooklyn's Finest (11 June)
- Dear John (14 April)
- The Spy Next Door (19 March)
- The Girl with the Dragon Tattoo (12 March)
- The Crazies (26 February)
- Youth in Revolt (5 February)
- 44 Inch Chest (15 January)

=== 2009 ===
- Law Abiding Citizen (27 November)
- Glorious 39 (20 November)
- The Men Who Stare at Goats (6 November)
- Johnny Mad Dog (23 October)
- District 13: Ultimatum (2 October)
- White Lightnin' (25 September)
- The September Issue (11 September)
- Dorian Gray (9 September)
- Mesrine: Public Enemy #1 (28 August)
- A Perfect Getaway (14 August)
- The Meerkats (7 August)
- Mesrine: Killer Instinct (7 August)
- Last Chance Harvey (5 June)
- Outlander (24 April)
- Let the Right One In (10 April)
- Religulous (3 April)
- Traitor (27 March)
- Lesbian Vampire Killers (20 March)
- The Young Victoria (6 March)
- Milk (23 January)
- Defiance (9 January)

=== 2008 ===
- The Baader Meinhof Complex (14 November)
- Igor (17 October)
- The Fall (3 October)
- Fly Me to the Moon (3 October)
- The Foot Fist Way (26 September)
- The Wave (19 September)
- Disaster Movie (5 September)
- Ben X (29 August)
- Miss Pettigrew Lives for a Day (15 August)
- The Mist (4 July)
- Teeth (20 June)
- Superhero Movie (6 June)
- Caramel (16 May)
- Vexille (9 May)
- Happy-Go-Lucky (18 April)
- Never Back Down (4 April)
- Love in the Time of Cholera (21 March)
- The Accidental Husband (29 February)
- Penelope (1 February)
- The Good Night (18 January)
- P.S. I Love You (4 January)

=== 2007 ===
- Chromophobia (14 December)
- Planet Terror (9 November)
- The Last Legion (19 October)
- Control (5 October)
- Death Proof (21 September)
- Bratz (17 August)
- The Hoax (3 August)
- Shut Up and Sing (29 June)
- The Painted Veil (27 April)
- Amazing Grace (23 March)
- The Illusionist (2 March)
- Hannibal Rising (9 February)
- Arthur and the Invisibles (2 February)
- Bobby (26 January)
- Miss Potter (5 January)

=== 2006 ===
- The Last Kiss (20 October)
- Hoodwinked! (29 September)
- Snow Cake (8 September)
- Wilderness (11 August)
- Atomised (14 July)
- District 13 (7 July)
- Things to Do Before You're 30 (2 June)
- Waiting... (19 May)
- The Other Half (15 May)
- Prime (12 May)
- Metal: A Headbanger's Journey (28 April)
- Hell (21 April)
- The Dark (7 April)
- The Big White (24 March)
- Tsotsi (17 March)
- The Weather Man (3 March)
- Just Friends (6 January)

=== 2005 ===
- Where the Truth Lies (2 December)
- Broken Flowers (21 October)
- Lord of War (14 October)
- Asylum (29 September)
- Born to Fight (2 September)
- The Devil's Rejects (5 August)
- The United States of Leland (1 July)
- Inside Deep Throat (10 June)
- Stander (27 May)
- Seed of Chucky (13 May)
- Downfall (1 April)
- Casshern (25 February)
- The Door in the Floor (11 February)
- Racing Stripes (4 February)
- Vera Drake (7 January)

=== 2004 ===
- My House in Umbria (26 November)
- Inside I'm Dancing (15 October)
- Wicker Park (10 September)
- Stage Beauty (3 September)
- Nathalie... (16 July)
- The Company (7 May)
- Eternal Sunshine of the Spotless Mind (30 April)
- Wondrous Oblivion (23 April)
- One Last Chance (12 March)
- People I Know (13 February)
- Game Over: Kasparov and the Machine (23 January)
- Lost in Translation (9 January)

=== 2003 ===
- Out of Time (26 December)
- The Statement (13 December)
- Together with You (12 December)
- American Cousins (28 November)
- The Mother (14 November)
- Raising Victor Vargas (19 September)
- Confidence (22 August)
- Standing in the Shadows of Motown (25 July)
- Dark Blue (4 July)
- Dirty Deeds (6 June)
- The Actors (16 May)
- I Capture the Castle (9 May)
- Equilibrium (14 March)
- Ararat (3 March)
- The Magdalene Sisters (21 February)
- Bollywood/Hollywood (14 February)
- The Kid Stays in the Picture (7 February)

=== 2002 ===
- Bowling for Columbine (15 November)
- Morvern Callar (1 November)
- My Little Eye (4 October)
- Van Wilder (27 September)
- Scratch (30 August)
- Hijack Stories (19 July)
- Novocaine (5 July)
- The Good Thief (6 June)
- No Man's Land (17 May)
- Slackers (10 May)
- Crossroads (29 March)
- The Son's Room (15 February)
- Just Visiting (8 February)
- Made (25 January)

=== 2001 ===
- Formula 51 (7 December)
- Soul Survivors (3 December)
- Me Without You (23 November)
- Down from the Mountain (26 October)
- Amélie (5 October)
- The Center of the World (21 September)
- Shiner (14 September)
- Get Over It (8 June)
- Gohatto (24 May)
- You Can Count on Me (23 March)
- When Brendan Met Trudy (9 March)
- The Adventures of Rocky and Bullwinkle (9 February)
- Requiem for a Dream (19 January)

=== 2000 ===
- Cecil B. Demented (8 December)
- The Way of the Gun (17 November)
- Book of Shadows: Blair Witch 2 (19 October)
- O Brother, Where Art Thou? (15 September)
- Relative Values (23 June, as Alliance Atlantis)
- Jesus' Son (5 May, as Alliance Atlantis)

=== 1999 ===
- Sunshine (10 December, as Alliance Atlantis)
- The Five Senses (23 September, as Alliance Atlantis)
- The Cup (16 September, as Alliance Atlantis)
- A Room for Romeo Brass (23 August, as Alliance Atlantis)
- Existenz (30 April, as Alliance Atlantis)

== Awards ==
In February 2011, Momentum Pictures won eight BAFTA awards, more than any other UK distributor. Seven awards went to The King's Speech, including Best Film and Best Actor. The Girl With the Dragon Tattoo won Best Film Not in the English Language.
