= Naomi J. Ogawa =

English actress

- Born: Westminster, London, England
- Other name: Naomi Tankel
- Education: Drama Centre London (BA)
- Years active: 2020–present

Naomi Jade Ogawa is an English actress. On television she is known for her role in the Netflix series Wednesday (2022).

== Early life ==
Ogawa was born in central London to an English father and a Japanese mother. Ogawa moved around growing up, attending multiple different international schools in Europe. She later boarded at Ross School in New York, where her interest in acting came unexpectedly through a school musical. She returned to London to audition for drama school. After two years, she was admitted to her first choice, going on to graduate from the Drama Centre London with a Bachelor of Arts in Acting in 2019.

== Career ==
=== Acting ===
Initially credited as Naomi Tankel, she made her feature film debut as Kate in Liam O'Donnell's 2020 science fiction film Skylines. In 2022 Ogawa was cast in her first main television role as the vampire Yoko Tanaka in Tim Burton's Netflix series Wednesday. In May 2024 it was reported that Ogawa would not be returning for season 2 of Wednesday.

=== Other activities ===
In 2023, Ogawa became the face of Roberto Cavalli's Wild Leda Collection. Ogawa has hosted the podcasts Identity Issues and Nay's Way. She is a qualified personal fitness trainer.

== Filmography ==
Year	Title	Role	Notes
2020	Assassin	Mistress	Short film
2020	Skylines	Kate	
2022	Wednesday	Yoko Tanaka	TV Series
2025	Maintenance Required	Jenny	
