= Lindsey Morgan =

American actress (born 1990)

- Morgan in 2026
- Born: Lindsey Marie Morgan; February 27, 1990 (age 36); Georgia, U.S.
- Education: University of Texas at Austin
- Occupation: Actress
- Years active: 2009–present
- Spouse: Shaun Sipos (m. 2023)
- Children: 1

Lindsey Marie Morgan (born February 27, 1990) is an American actress. She is known for playing Raven Reyes in the CW science fiction drama series The 100 (2014–2020) and Micki Ramirez in the action crime drama series Walker (2021–2022).

== Early life ==
Lindsey Marie Morgan was born February 27, 1990, in Georgia, United States, to Gus Morgan and Alice Burciaga. She is of French, Irish, and Mexican descent. She has an older brother, a half-sister, and five step-siblings.

== Career ==
=== 2010–2013: Beginnings and General Hospital ===
Morgan began her career in college at the University of Texas at Austin, then left for Los Angeles to chase her acting dream. Within her first year of college, Morgan stayed busy by continually booking commercials and print ads. She was cast as an extra on the critically acclaimed series Friday Night Lights. Morgan decided to move to Los Angeles to continue her work as an actress. Her first real role was in the movie Detention (2011) starring Josh Hutcherson where she played a mean cheerleader named Alexis. In 2011, she landed the leading role in the MTV film DisCONNECTED (2011) as social media obsessed Maria. "DISconnected" was part of the MTV "A Thin Line" campaign. The film and the campaign were developed in order to empower young people to identify, respond to, and stop the spread of digital abuse in their lives.

On April 17, 2012, TVLine reported that Morgan had been cast as the contract role of Kristina Davis on the American ABC Daytime soap opera General Hospital and would make her debut on May 25, 2012. For this role, Morgan was nominated for Daytime Emmy Award for Outstanding Younger Actress in a Drama Series in 2013. Of learning about her Emmy nomination, she said, "I was worried that I'd gotten the call time wrong for my appearance on Franklin & Bash before I saw that it said "Congratulations!, I'm stunned, I'm still so shocked. I'm so honored. On March 26, 2013, it was announced that she would be departing her role as Kristina, last airing on March 4, 2013.

Immediately upon leaving General Hospital, Morgan filmed a web series called Destroy the Alpha Gammas, about which she told TV Source Magazine:

"I loved every second of it. I made some great friends and had a great blast doing it."

In 2013, Morgan had a supporting role in the indie movie Chastity Bites (2013). In 2017 she starred in the second installment of the Skyline film series, playing Captain Rose, leader of the human resistance against an alien invasion. She later reprised the role, becoming the lead actor in the franchise's third installment, Skylines, released on Netflix in 2020. Morgan is also slated to appear in the fourth film, Skyline: Warpath, in 2025.

=== 2014–2020: The 100 and further success ===
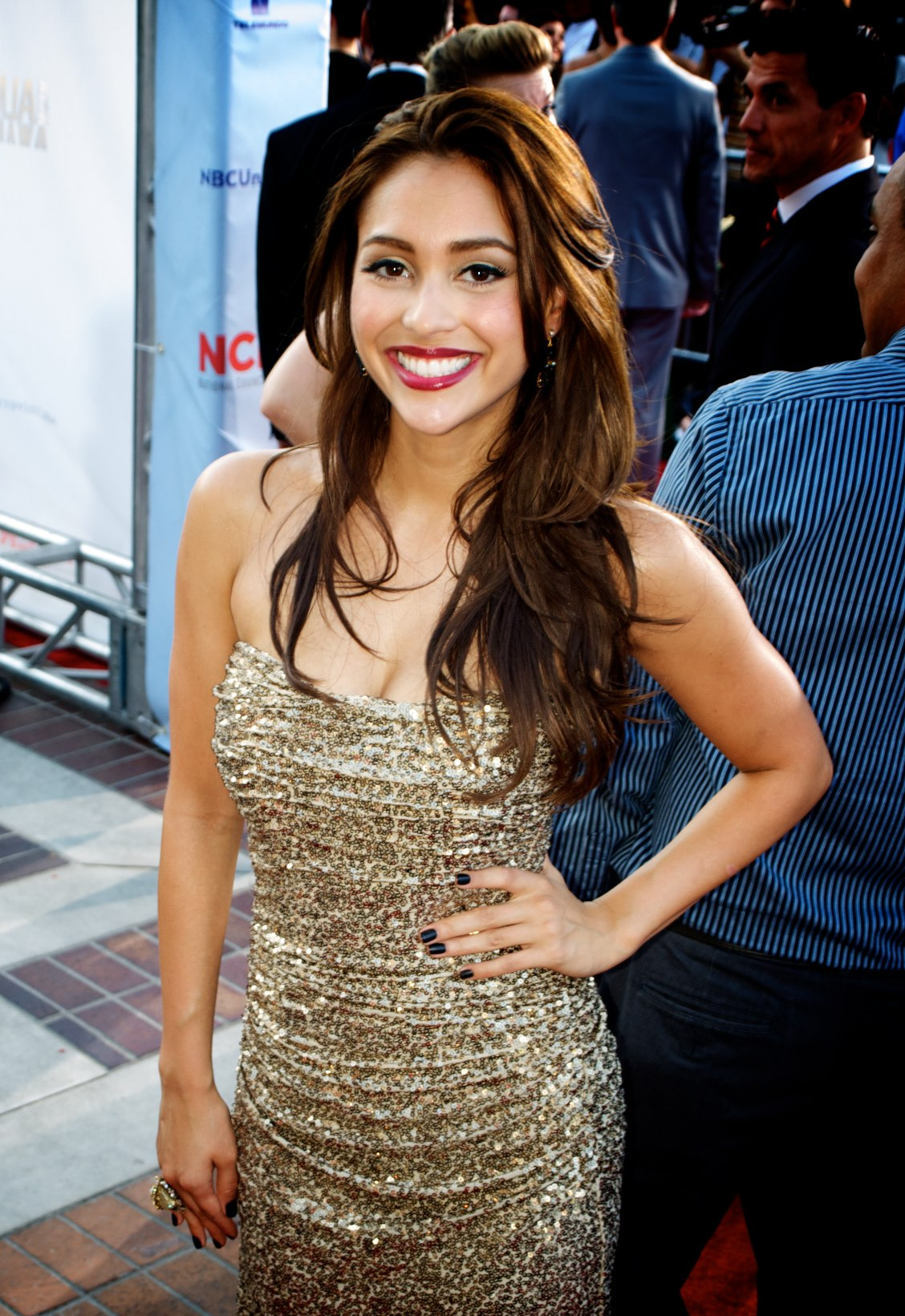
Morgan (age 22) at the 2012 Iifa Awards

On August 20, 2013, it was announced that Morgan landed a recurring role on The CW science fiction drama series The 100, which ended after seven seasons. For season 2, Morgan was upgraded to series regular.

Morgan describes her character:

"Raven is a total badass. She is a guy's girl who is brilliant because she's also a prodigy when it comes to mechanical engineering. She's the youngest mechanical engineer the space station has had in 52 years, and she loves getting dirty and down with it. She's feisty, she's sassy, she's strong; she's a really cool girl. She can definitely hold her own."

In 2015, Morgan filmed her first leading film role starring as Ariana in the television film Casa Vita alongside ABC Family's Baby Daddy star Jean-Luc Bilodeau. Ariana is a Mexican-American cook dreaming of opening her own fusion cuisine restaurant much to her father's dismay. Ariana works at her father's restaurant, Casa Vita, where she meets Early Lindstrom.

On April 18, 2016, Morgan landed a lead role in the independent thriller Lasso, alongside Andrew Jacobs, Sean Patrick Flanery. Morgan's character holds a huge amount of guilt for not keeping the senior citizens safe and takes on the duty of ensuring their safety throughout the film.

== Personal life ==
On December 29, 2020, Morgan announced her engagement to actor Shaun Sipos on Instagram. They married on September 21, 2023, in Austin, Texas.

They had their first child Eden Aurora Sipos in 2025.

== Filmography ==
=== Film ===
Year	Title	Role
2011	Detention	Alexis Spencer
2011	Disconnected	Maria
2013	Chastity Bites	Noemi
2014	ETXR	Florence
2017	Beyond Skyline	Cpt. Rose Corley
2018	Lasso	Kit
2018	Summer Days, Summer Nights	Debbie Espinoza
2019	Inside Game	Stephanie
2020	Skylines	Cpt. Rose Corley

=== Television ===
Year	Title	Role	Notes
2010	Catch 21	Herself	Game show contestant
2011	B-Sides	N/A	Episode: "She's Too Good for Everyone"
2011	Supah Ninjas	Chantelle	Episode: "The Magnificent"
2011	A Thin Line	Maria	Television film
2012	How I Met Your Mother	Lauren	Episode: "The Drunk Train"
2012	Happy Endings	Tracy	Episode: "Big White Lies"
2012–2013	General Hospital	Kristina Davis	Main role; 67 episodes
2013	Destroy the Alpha Gammas	Lauren	7 episodes
2013	Franklin & Bash	Jennifer	Episode: "Shoot to Thrill"
2013	The Flip Side	N/A	Episodes: "Resolutions", "Clubbing"
2013	Shark Bites	Sorority Girl 3	Episode: "Episode #1.0"
2014–2020	The 100	Raven Reyes	Recurring role (season 1); 11 episodes Main role (season 2–7); 68 episodes Also directed episode: "The Queen's Gambit"
2016	Casa Vita	Ariana	Television film
2016	The Night Shift	Kryztal	Episode: "The Way Back"
2021	Walker	Micki Ramirez	Main role (season 1–2); 24 episodes
2025	S.W.A.T.	Karla Lopez	Episode: "The Santa Clara"

=== Music videos ===
Year	Title	Artist
2011	"Boyfriend"	Big Time Rush

== Awards and nominations ==
Year	Award	Category	Work	Result	Ref
2013	Daytime Emmy Award	Outstanding Younger Actress in a Drama Series	General Hospital	Nominated	
