= Skylines (film) =

2020 science fiction film by Liam O'Donnell

- Theatrical release poster
- Directed by: Liam O'Donnell
- Screenplay by: Liam O'Donnell
- Story by: Matthew E. Chausse; Liam O'Donnell
- Based on: Characters by: Joshua Cordes; Liam O'Donnell
- Produced by: Liam O'Donnell; Greg Strause; Colin Strause; Matthew E. Chausse
- Starring: Lindsey Morgan; Jonathan Howard; Daniel Bernhardt; Rhona Mitra; James Cosmo; Alexander Siddig
- Cinematography: Alain Duplantier
- Edited by: Barrett Heathcote
- Music by: Ram Khatabakhsh
- Production companies: Hydraulx Entertainment; Liam O'Donnell Films; XYZ Films; m45 Productions; Gifflar Films Limited; Gifflar (Patriot) Films Limited; UAB Cobaltas; Ingenious Media; Lipsync Productions LLP; Artbox; Fasten Films
- Distributed by: Vertical Entertainment
- Release dates: October 25, 2020 (FrightFest); December 18, 2020 (United States)
- Running time: 110 minutes
- Country: United States
- Language: English
- Budget: $8 million
- Box office: $170,581

Skylines (stylized as SKYLIN3S, and also known as Skyline 3) is a 2020 American science fiction action film co-produced and directed by Liam O'Donnell which he wrote from a story he developed with producer Matthew E. Chausse. It is a sequel to Beyond Skyline (2017), and the third installment in the Skyline film series.

The film premiered at the London FrightFest film festival on October 25, 2020, and was released in the United States in theaters and on Apple TV by Vertical Entertainment on December 18, 2020, all during the COVID-19 pandemic.

== Plot ==
Ten years after the first invasion, (Note: Depicted in Skyline and Beyond Skyline.) Rose leads the human fleet against the aliens, now called 'Harvesters', aboard the Armada, a mother ship orbiting the Moon. When she breaks through enemy lines, she hesitates to fire and one of her ships is destroyed. As the aliens prepare to attack Earth, Rose sacrifices another one of her ships, killing thousands but ultimately destroying the Armada. Overcome with guilt, she vanishes while humanity rebuilds, coexisting with billions of 'Pilots' (hybrid alien-humans).

Five years after the battle, Rose lives in a tent city near the ruins of London, avoiding resistance forces searching for her and keeping the ageing effects of her hybrid nature at bay with the help of hyper-oxygenated blood transfusions prepared by her friend Dr. Mal. A viral pandemic strikes the Pilots and anyone using transplanted Pilot limbs. The virus eats the Pilots alive while reverting them back into their brainwashed state. Resistance leader Leon captures Rose and brings her before General Radford who reveals that the Armada's core drive warped to Cobalt One, the Harvester homeworld, before the ship's destruction. Only with the Armada's core drive can they save the Pilots. Rose reluctantly agrees to join the mission.

At Cobalt One the ship crashes, leaving it on emergency power. Crew members Rose, Trent, Leon, Owens, and Alexi find a planet filled with dead Harvesters and strange mutations. Severely wounded, Alexi sacrifices herself with a grenade. The team reaches the Armada, where Rose briefly succumbs to the Harvester Matriarch's control, who accuses humans of wanting to destroy her species. Trent helps Rose break free, revealing that her telepathic influence caused her to freeze during the war. Now empowered, Rose steals the core drive. However, Owens betrays the team, infecting Trent and fleeing with the core drive.

Rose and Leon later discover that Radford bombed Cobalt One before their arrival with a biological weapon, the same virus that is infecting the Pilots on Earth. As the two return aboard the ship, Radford uses the core drive to destroy Cobalt One and the Harvesters in an act of genocide. He reveals to them that the virus was intended to peacefully euthanize the Pilots and destroy the Harvesters, but it had the unintended side effect of reverting the Pilots back into their brainwashed state. Having boarded the ship, the Matriarch also kills Radford, intending to destroy the Earth in revenge. After realizing the truth about the virus, Owens attacks Zhi, who manages to fight him off. As the ship enters a wormhole, Owens disintegrates into an energy field. Trent, whom Leon manages to snap back to normal, knocks the Matriarch in, but has most of his body disintegrated.

On Earth, Mal works on a cure, but infected Pilots attack before she can finish testing. The residents, including Mal, Kate, Grant, and Huana, fight back, eliminating the Pilots but losing Grant and others. Just in time, Rose arrives and sucks all the Pilots into her ship. With Mal's cure and her ship, they can now cure all infected Pilots worldwide.

In the aftermath, Mal transplants Trent's brain into a new Pilot body, saving him. Zhi hacks into Radford's personal files and discovers the location of a prison where Radford had held anyone that he considered to be an enemy of the state, including Rose and Trent's long-missing father Mark Corley. Rose orders a course set for the prison, intending to rescue her adoptive father.

== Cast ==
- Lindsey Morgan as Rose Corley, a super-powered captain of the survivors and daughter of the late Jarrod and Elaine.
- Jonathan Howard as Leon
- Daniel Bernhardt as Owens
- Rhona Mitra as Dr. Mal
- James Cosmo as Grant
- Alexander Siddig as General Radford
- Yayan Ruhian as Huana, a Laos ex-policeman and bandit who lost three of his limbs in Beyond Skyline which have been replaced with Pilot limbs.
- Ieva Andrejevaitė as Alexi
- Samantha Jean as Elaine
- Jeremy Fitzgerald as Trent Corley, Mark Corley’s son and Rose’s adoptive brother who is now a hybrid and pilot .
- Giedre Mockeliunaite as Izzy
- Cha-Lee Yoon as Zhi
- Phong Giang as the Matriarch, the supreme ruler of the Harvesters and the one behind the events of the previous 2 films.
- Naomi Tankel as Kate
- Rokas Spanlinskas as Violet
- Tony Black as Jarrod

== Reception ==
=== Box office ===
The film opened theatrically in Vietnam on December 11, and grossed $49,978 from 960 theaters in its opening weekend, ranking fifth with an average of $52 per theater. The film was pulled from 915 theaters in its second weekend, ranking eighth with $972 and a decrease of 98.1%.

=== Critical response ===
Rotten Tomatoes gives the film a 56% approval rating based on 27 reviews, with an average rating of 5.4/10. On Metacritic, the film has a weighted average score of 46 out of 100, based on 4 critics, indicating "mixed or average reviews".

== Sequel ==
In December 2020, writer/director O'Donnell announced plans to continue the series, with intentions to bring back the principal cast. That same month, Frank Grillo expressed interest in reprising his role in the series. In January 2024, it was announced XYZ Films had acquired the international rights to the fourth Skyline film, titled Skyline: Warpath.
