= Skyline (2010 film) =

2010 film by the Brothers Strause

- Theatrical release poster
- Directed by: The Brothers Strause
- Written by: Joshua Cordes; Liam O'Donnell
- Produced by: The Brothers Strause; Kristian Andresen; Liam O'Donnell
- Starring: Eric Balfour; Scottie Thompson; Brittany Daniel; David Zayas; Donald Faison
- Cinematography: Michael Watson
- Edited by: Nicholas Wayman-Harris
- Music by: Matthew Margeson
- Production companies: Rogue; Relativity Media; Hydraulx Entertainment; Transmission; Rat Entertainment
- Distributed by: Universal Pictures (United States); IM Global (International)
- Release dates: November 11, 2010 (Australia); November 12, 2010 (United States)
- Running time: 94 minutes
- Country: United States
- Language: English
- Budget: $10–20 million
- Box office: $68.3 million

Skyline is a 2010 American science fiction disaster film directed by Greg and Colin Strause and co-produced and written by Liam O'Donnell. It stars Eric Balfour, Scottie Thompson, Brittany Daniel, Crystal Reed, David Zayas, and Donald Faison as a group of Los Angeles residents who witness an alien invasion while in a condominium.

Released on November 12, 2010, in the United States, Skyline was panned by critics. The film grossed $68.3 million worldwide against its $10–20 million budget.

Skyline initiated the Skyline film series, being followed by three sequels: Beyond Skyline (2017), Skylines (2020) and Skyline: Warpath (2025).

== Plot ==
Jarrod and his girlfriend Elaine arrive in Los Angeles, California, for Jarrod's best friend Terry's birthday party. They celebrate with Terry's girlfriend, Candice, and his assistant, Denise. During a private argument about whether or not they should move, Elaine reveals she is pregnant.

The next morning, blue lights descend from the sky, hypnotizing anyone who looks at them. Every hypnotized person becomes zombie-like and immobilized and is then collected by the light machines. This is the work of several alien ships that descend from the sky. Jarrod is about to be taken when Terry tackles him. The two escape the alien drones and meet up with Elaine.

Terry looks for his neighbor Walt to leave in his car in the condominium. Walt's dog runs toward a creature; Walt tries to stop it and gets taken. Jarrod thinks open water is safer without machines. They meet a bickering couple, Colin and Jen, preparing to flee. As Terry's car leaves the garage, a massive alien flattens it, killing Denise. Terry escapes but is soon abducted. The trio retreats to the garage, encountering a multi-tentacled squid that corners them until building concierge Oliver hits it with an SUV. In the struggle, the squid sucks out Colin's brain. Jen joins but gets abducted while they run back inside. The four survivors hide in the condominium.

The next day, the US Air Force attacks the alien spaceship and drones with stealth unmanned vehicles and conventional aircraft. One plane reaches the mothership and fires a nuclear missile, causing a massive explosion. The aliens survive, and the ship begins to repair itself. After Jarrod tells Elaine the alien light empowered him, he insists that safety lies outside. Oliver wants to stay and tries to restrain him. Jarrod begins to change, lifts Oliver off the floor, and vows to protect his family.

A US Navy fleet arrives off the coast, and helicopters land soldiers on nearby rooftops. Jarrod and Elaine go to the roof hoping to catch a safe ride. Oliver and Candice stay in the condominium but are found when Candice accidentally exposes herself to the light and is abducted by a squid alien, with both being blown up by soldiers on a nearby roof soon after. Afterwards, Oliver attempts to kill a tanker alien by turning on a gas stove and igniting a lighter, causing the room to explode. The aliens throw the soldiers off the roof, and a squid alien attacks Jarrod and Elaine. The badly injured Jarrod kills it. The couple accepts their fate, looks into the blue light, and are sucked into the mother ship.

Inside the alien ship, Elaine wakes on a pile of human bodies. Tubes are sucking human brains into machines. Probes go through the pile looking for what they can find. Elaine sees Jarrod in the pile but has to watch helplessly as his brain is removed. She is probed and transported to a chamber with other pregnant women. She watches as another pregnant woman has her baby removed and dies. Meanwhile, Jarrod's brain, glowing red, is inserted into a new alien body. Animating the body, Jarrod seems to retain control and comes to the aid of Elaine, who recognizes him when he caresses her belly and her head. He then turns around to confront advancing aliens. In the credits, a series of still images depict "Jarrod" protecting Elaine and their child from the aliens.

== Cast ==
- Eric Balfour as Jarrod
- Scottie Thompson as Elaine
- Brittany Daniel as Candice
- Crystal Reed as Denise
- Neil Hopkins as Ray
- David Zayas as Oliver
- Donald Faison as Terry
- Robin Gammell as Walt
- Tanya Newbould as Jen
- J. Paul Boehmer as Colin

== Production ==
The project began filming in Marina Del Rey in February 2010 and continued through March 31. Most of the action was shot in the high-rise condo in which Greg Strause lives.

The physical production cost only $500,000. With all the visual effects the total budget was around $10–20 million.

On November 11, 2010, producer Brett Ratner said on the Opie and Anthony Show that the film cost $10 million to make. The Brothers Strause insisted they would film a sequel with their own money and try to find a distributor to release it.

=== Legal action from Sony ===
In August 2010, it was reported that Sony Pictures Entertainment was contemplating legal action against the Strause brothers, the directors of Skyline, and the owners of Hydraulx Filmz. Sony paid Hydraulx to generate visual effects work for Battle: Los Angeles. But Hydraulx never informed Sony that the siblings were directing a rival alien invasion feature, similarly driven by special effects, scheduled for release four months before Sony's feature. A representative for the Strauses issued a statement: "Any claims of impropriety are completely baseless. This is a blatant attempt by Sony to force these independent filmmakers to move a release date that has long been set by Universal and Relativity and is outside the filmmakers' control".

On March 17, 2011, Sony released a statement dismissing its arbitration against Hydraulx and the Strause Brothers, saying that after the discovery phase, they were satisfied that none of the Battle: Los Angeles visual effects were used in Skyline. The Strause brothers stated, “We’re glad to put this behind us. We’ve been honored to work on several wonderful SPE projects in the past and look forward to future collaborations.”

== Music ==
Skyline (Original Motion Picture Soundtrack)

Film score by Matthew Margeson
- Released: November 16, 2010
- Length: 52:32
- Label: Varèse Sarabande

Composer Matthew Margeson is a colleague of Brian Tyler, who served as one of the film's executive producers.

Some of the songs that were not on the soundtrack but are featured in the movie is “Wheres My Money At”, “New Money”, and “Something 2 Ride 2” by Royce Da 5’9, “Kings And Queens” by ((Thirty Seconds To Mars)), “ Sine Language (Metasyn Remix)” and “ The American Way” by (The Crystal Method), and “Hiding Out” by Alexandra Sargent.

== Release ==
The film was released on November 12, 2010, in North America and November 11 in Australia, and was distributed by Universal Pictures. Following the theatrical release, the movie was to run on Netflix. A trailer was released August 13 and attached to Scott Pilgrim vs. the World and Devil. The second trailer was released on September 29 and then attached to My Soul to Take on October 15. Another trailer was also attached to Paranormal Activity 2. The trailer has also been attached to Red and Jackass 3D in the United Kingdom and Canada.

== Reception ==
=== Critical response ===
Review aggregation website Rotten Tomatoes gives Skyline an approval rating of 15% based on 82 reviews, with an average rating of 3.6/10. The site's critical consensus reads, "A middling sci-fi entry, Skyline offers proof that solid special effects alone cannot overcome a flat storyline filled with uninspired dialogue." On Metacritic the film has a weighted average score of 26 out of 100, based on 18 critics, indicating "generally unfavorable reviews". Audiences polled by CinemaScore gave the film an average grade of "D−" on an A+ to F scale.

Writing in Variety, Joe Leydon panned the film: "Imagine a Kmart mash-up of Transformers and Independence Day and you're appropriately primed for Skyline, an underwhelming and derivative sci-fi thriller that's only marginally more impressive than a run-of-the-mill SyFy Channel telepic." Michael Philips of the Chicago Tribune wrote that the "effects are pretty good, on a fairly limited budget. And that's about all you can say for Skyline." Screen Rant's Ben Kendrick wrote that the film "comes across as a big-screen B-movie with a convoluted plot and too limited of a scope to make the audience feel the worldwide alien-apocalypse that’s supposedly unfolding in the film". In the New York Times, Mike Hale concluded, "it turns out that all the running and hiding and chopping (there’s an axe) was beside the point, which is the sort of thing that can make you angry if you care about the characters, but in this case is kind of a relief."

There were some positive reviews, including Matthew Sorrento's at Film Threat, who commented, "Skyline, if not always successful, refashions the modern alien invasion motif as the hopeless siege that it should be." Kim Newman from Empire Magazine also endorsed the film, writing, "... delivers all the Saturday night whiz-bang and Sunday morning brain-ripping you could want."

=== Box office ===
Skyline opened on November 12, 2010, and grossed $4,737,555 on its opening day from 2,880 theaters for a 1-day average of $1,645 per theater. It grossed a total of $11,692,415 over its opening weekend from 2,880 theaters for a 3-day average of $4,060 per theater, and ranking No. 4 for the weekend behind Megamind at No. 1, Unstoppable at No. 2, and Due Date at No. 3. As of January 2013, the film made $21,416,355 in the United States and $46,848,618 internationally for a worldwide total of $68,264,973.

=== Home media ===
Skyline was released on Blu-ray and DVD on March 22, 2011.

== Sequels ==
In May 2014 at the annual Cannes Film Festival, it was revealed that a sequel titled Beyond Skyline was planned to go into production, but without the Strause brothers as the writers and directors. Instead, Skyline producer and co-writer Liam O'Donnell was brought on board, marking his directorial debut. The film was released in the United States on December 15, 2017.

The third film in the trilogy, Skylines, was released on December 18, 2020.

In January 2024, it was announced XYZ Films had acquired the international rights to the fourth Skyline film, titled Skyline: Warpath.

== See also ==
- List of films featuring drones
- List of films featuring extraterrestrials
