= Greg and Colin Strause =

American brother film directors

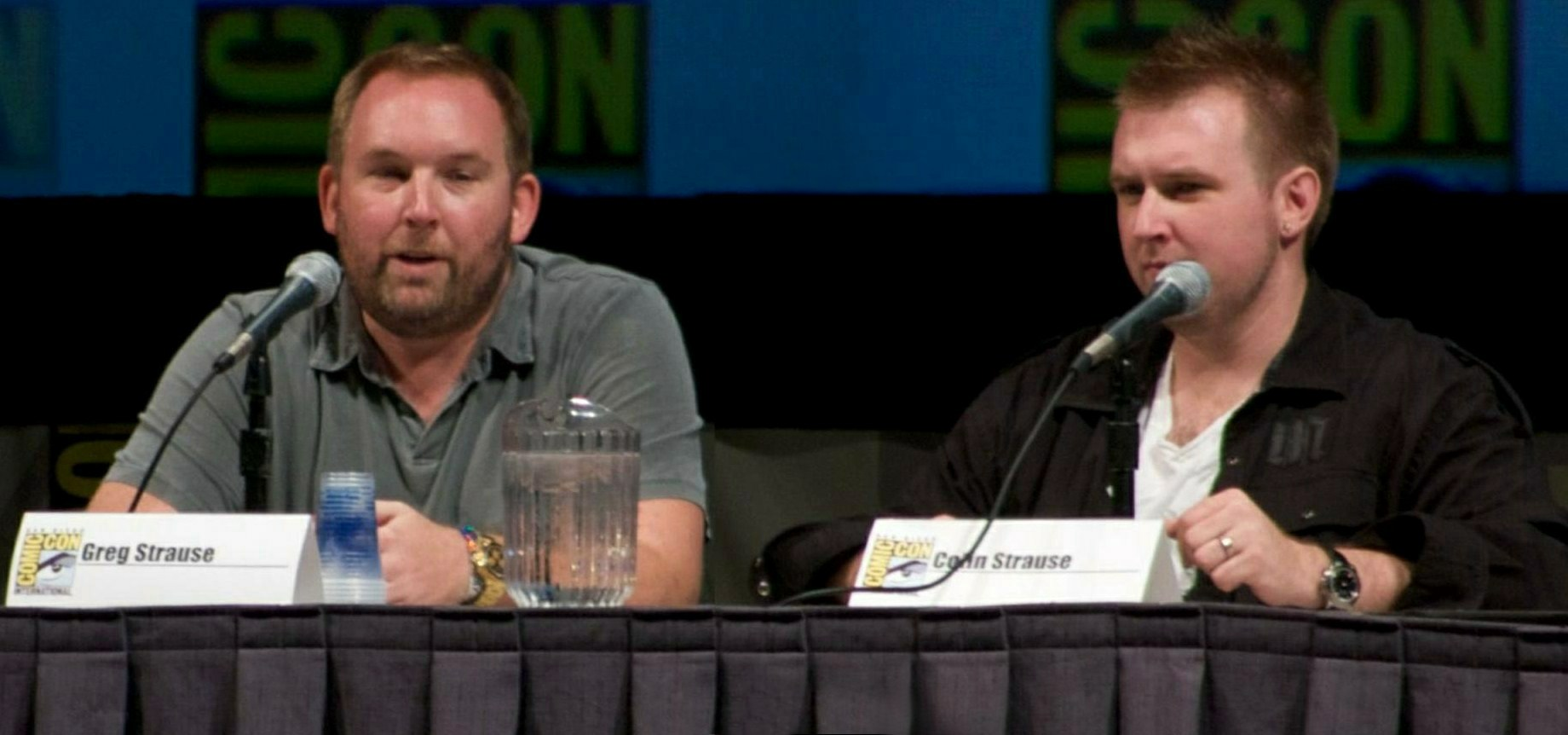
- Greg (l.) and Colin Strause
- Born: Greg: January 16, 1975 (age 51) Colin: November 8, 1976 (age 49); Waukegan, Illinois, U.S.
- Other names: The Brothers Strause
- Occupations: Film directors; producers
- Employer(s): Pixel Envy (1996–2002); Hydraulx (2002–present)
- Known for: Aliens vs. Predator: Requiem; Skyline

Greg and Colin Strause, known professionally as The Brothers Strause, are film directors, producers and special effects artists. They are known for directing the 2007 film Aliens vs. Predator: Requiem and the 2010 film Skyline. The brother duo are also founders of Hydraulx, a special effects company.

== Life and career ==
They began experimenting with visual effects in their early teens using Amiga computers. In 1995, they moved to Los Angeles and started working on the special effects for films such as The Nutty Professor (1996) and The X-Files. In 1996, they formed a digital effects company with partners Edson Williams and Mat Beck that was called Pixel Envy, which they worked on until 2002.

They began working on big-budget films such as Volcano and the iceberg sequence of James Cameron's Academy Award-winning Titanic. They shifted again and began working on music videos and commercials, handling the special effects for artists such as U2, Britney Spears, Godsmack, Tool, Powerman 5000 and Aerosmith as well as spots for Nike, Jeep and Pepsi.

In 2000, Colin won an MTV Video Music Award for Best Art Direction for the Red Hot Chili Peppers' video, "Californication." This led the brothers to start directing under the moniker "The Brothers Strause," and their Linkin Park clip "Crawling" was nominated for Best Direction and Best Rock Video at the 2001 VMA's. Other artists they have directed for include A Perfect Circle, Nickelback, Paulina Rubio, Opeth, Flyleaf, Disturbed, Staind, Taproot and Abandoned Pools. Their music video for A Perfect Circle's "Passive" marked their second collaboration with the band. The video was shot almost entirely with thermal cameras and featured on the Constantine soundtrack and DVD.

The Strause's have performed special effects work on such films as 300, X-Men: The Last Stand, Fantastic Four, Terminator 3: Rise of the Machines, and The Day After Tomorrow, for which Greg won a British Academy Award (BAFTA).

The Brothers have directed spots for Coca-Cola, World of Warcraft, Gatorade, Ford Motor Company, the United States Marine Corps, Toyota, Fresca, Universal Studios and Sony PlayStation's God of War.

The Brothers Strause made their film directing debut by directing Aliens vs. Predator: Requiem, a sequel to Paul W. S. Anderson's Alien vs. Predator. The film was released on Christmas 2007 to extremely negative reviews.

In the fall of 2008, the Brothers directed 50 Cent's music video "Get Up" as well as commercials for Pennzoil and Shell, in addition to supplying some visual effects for Avatar.

In 2010, the Brothers directed and produced the science fiction thriller Skyline, written by Joshua Cordes and Liam O'Donnell, starring Scottie Thompson, Eric Balfour, Donald Faison and David Zayas. The film was met with poor reviews but given its budget was US$10–$20 million, it performed well commercially, grossing a total of nearly US$79 million worldwide. Sony Pictures Entertainment filed a lawsuit against the brothers and Hydralux, who had been hired to provide visual effects for Battle: Los Angeles. Sony alleged that they had used time and resources meant for Battle: Los Angeles, and instead used them on Skyline, which was accused of being too similar by Sony. However, Sony dropped the lawsuit in 2011, shortly before Skyline's home video debut, satisfied that their concerns about the competing film proved to be unfounded.

== Filmography ==
Directors

- Mute (2003) (short film)
- 16mm Mystery (2004) (short film)
- Aliens vs. Predator: Requiem (2007)
- Skyline (2010)

Producers

- Skyline (2010)
- Beyond Skyline (2017)
- Skylines (2020)

Executive producers

- Take Shelter (2011)
- The Bay (2012)
- Elizabeth Harvest (2018)

== Videography ==
- "Trust" by The Pharcyde (2000)
- "The Itch" by Vitamin C (2000)
- "Crawling" by Linkin Park (2000)
- "How You Remind Me" by Nickelback (2001)
- "Bombshell" by Powerman 5000 (2001)
- "Da Hot Shit" by Bell Biv DeVoe (2001)
- "The Remedy" by Abandoned Pools (2002)
- "I Stand Alone" by Godsmack (2002)
- "Don't Say Goodbye" by Paulina Rubio (2002)
- "Prayer" by Disturbed (2002)
- "Poem" by Taproot (2002)
- "Price to Play" by Staind (2003)
- "Download It" by Clea (2003)
- "Weak and Powerless" by A Perfect Circle (2003)
- "Passive" by A Perfect Circle (2005)
- "I'm So Sick" by Flyleaf (2005)
- "Fully Alive" by Flyleaf (2006)
- "Love in This Club" by Usher feat. Young Jeezy (2008)
- "Moving Mountains" by Usher (2008)
- "Get Up" by 50 Cent (2008)
