= Yakuza Apocalypse =

- Theatrical release poster
- Directed by: Takashi Miike
- Written by: Yoshitaka Yamaguchi
- Produced by: Yoshinori Chiba; Shin'ichirô Masuda; Shinjiro Nishimura; Misako Saka
- Starring: Hayato Ichihara; Yayan Ruhian; Riko Narumi
- Cinematography: Hajime Kanda
- Edited by: Kenji Yamashita
- Music by: Kôji Endô
- Production companies: Django Film; Gambit; Happinet; OLM, Inc.
- Distributed by: Nikkatsu
- Release dates: 21 May 2015 (Cannes); 20 June 2015 (Japan)
- Running time: 115 minutes
- Country: Japan
- Languages: Japanese; English

Yakuza Apocalypse (極道大戦争, Gokudō Daisensō) is a 2015 Japanese action fantasy–yakuza vampire film directed by Takashi Miike and starring Hayato Ichihara, Yayan Ruhian, and Riko Narumi. It was written by Yoshitaka Yamaguchi. It premiered at the Cannes Film Festival on May 21, 2015, before being released theatrically on June 20 throughout Japan.

== Plot ==
Genyo Kamura is a benevolent Yakuza boss who is secretly a vampire. Because of this, he can withstand almost every injury, but he must also periodically drink blood from other people. One day, a gunslinging priest and a martial artist named Mad-Dog arrive in Kamura's town, where they decapitate Kamura and wound his second-in-command Akira Kageyama. In his last moments, Kamura's dying head bites Kageyama, thus turning him into a vampire too.

Dazed and confused, Kageyama wanders the streets and bites a passerby, who also becomes a vampire, which initiates a vampire epidemic. Eventually, the entire town population becomes vampires, except for the local Yakuza, since vampires dislike Yakuza blood.

Meanwhile, it is revealed that the Yakuza Captain has been secretly working for the priest and Mad-Dog, who talk about a "modern monster" that is supposed to arrive in town with delay. Furthermore, the Captain starts exhibiting strange behaviour and her brain starts to melt and sporadically flow out of her ear canal. The "modern monster" is revealed to be a man in a frog inflatable costume who is a superb acrobatic martial artists and can hypnotize people.

In the film's climax, two Yakuza brothers manage to kill the priest and attempt to kill the monster, but get killed. Meanwhile, an axe-wielding vampire boy kills the rambling Captain. After that, Kageyama and the frog-monster have a duel in which the monster's costume gets destroyed except for his face-mask, and Kageyama seemingly kills the monster by taking off 2 band-aids which covered the monster's navel.

Weakened Kageyama kisses his love interest Kyoko, and after that, he and Mad-Dog have a drawn-out test of strength during which Mad-Dog dies. The film ends with Kageyama growing bat-wings and flying off, while Kyoko rings a gong and a gigantic version of the frog-costumed monster starts destroying the landscape.

== Cast ==
- Hayato Ichihara as Akira Kageyama
- Yayan Ruhian as Kyoken (狂犬) / Mad Dog
- Riko Narumi as Kyōko Anan
- Lily Franky as Genyō Kamiura
- Reiko Takashima

== Production ==
Production on the film began on 17 April 2014. The film features Indonesian actor and stunt choreographer Yayan Ruhian, who had previously co-starred in The Raid and The Raid 2. It marks his first foray into acting outside of his native Indonesia.

== Reception ==
The film received mixed to positive reviews from critics. On Rotten Tomatoes, the film has a 62% rating, based on 39 reviews. Metacritic reports a 62 out of 100 rating, based on 14 critics, indicating "generally favorable reviews".

== See also ==
- Kappa (folklore)
