= I Was a Zombie for the F.B.I. =

- Film poster
- Directed by: Marius Penczner
- Written by: Marius Penczner; John Gillick
- Produced by: Marius Penczner; Nancy Donelson
- Starring: Larry Raspberry; James Raspberry; John Gillick
- Production company: Penczner Productions
- Release date: August 10, 1982 (UK)
- Running time: 105 minutes
- Country: United States
- Language: English

I Was a Zombie for the F.B.I. is a 1982 science fiction black-and-white film. It was directed by Marius Penczner and filmed by students from Memphis State University, now known as the University of Memphis.

== Plot ==
After landing by Pleasantville, United States, the aliens convince two Earth criminals to help them rule the world. The aliens hypnotize people into a "zomboid state" and unleash a reptilian creature. Two F.B.I. agents fight against the aliens, criminals, and the creature to combat the threat of imminent world domination.

== Production ==
Inspired by 1950s science fiction films, I Was a Zombie for the F.B.I. was filmed in black-and-white by Memphis State students and was directed by Marius Penczner. The film's budget was $27,000, which came from the director's Emmy award-winning short film.

The stop motion reptilian monster was later used in the director's film TV Dinners.

== Reception ==
Bob Dylan and Dennis Hopper enjoyed the film, as did the bands ZZ Top and The Everly Brothers. Dylan said that he wished he was in the film.

Mac McEntire, writing for DVD Verdict, said that he liked the film, but that "long stretches of dialogue with little to no action might be true to the era to which this film pays tribute, but it might move a little too slowly for some of today's viewers". Andy McKeague, of Monsters and Critics, wrote that "Zombie is a fun film, but one you need to be in the right mood for. It has all the markings of the 1950s TV cop shows it deliberately resembles and enough of the E.T. savvy to appeal to fans of Plan 9 to The X-files".

== Home media ==
The film was first released on USA Network in 1995. It was released on DVD in 2005 with title cards, new footage, new effects, and different music. The director removed 33 minutes of footage from the film.
