= Yayan Ruhian =

Indonesian martial artist and actor (born 1968)

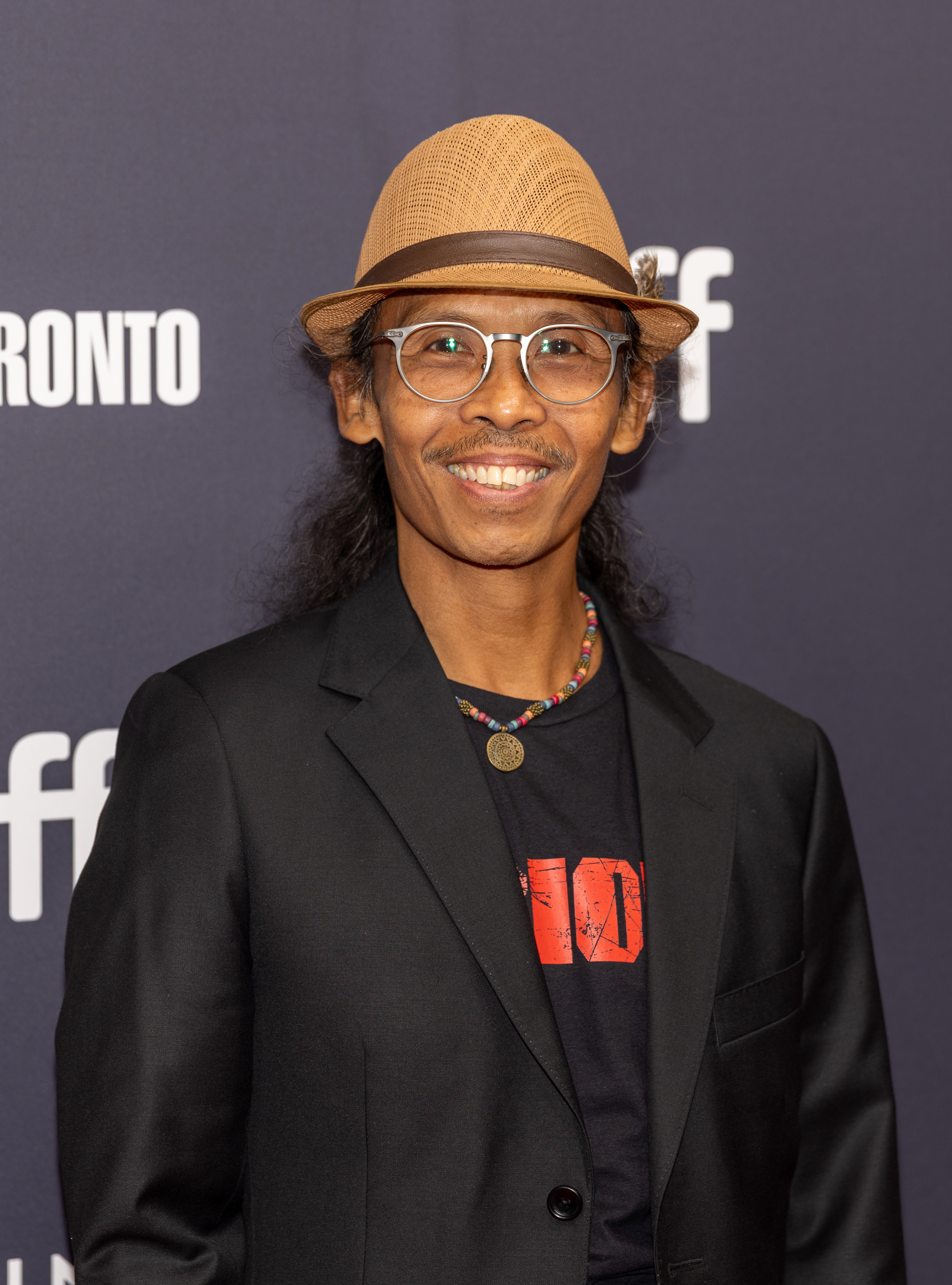
- Ruhian in 2025
- Born: 19 October 1968 (age 58); Tasikmalaya, West Java, Indonesia
- Occupations: Martial artist, Celebrity, Actor
- Years active: 2008–present
- Notable work: The Raid; The Raid 2
- Spouse: Wawa Suwartini (m. 1997)
- Children: 3

Yayan Ruhian (born 19 October 1968) is an Indonesian martial artist and actor. He is known for co-starring in Gareth Evans' films The Raid (2011) as Mad Dog, The Raid 2 (2014) as Prakoso, Star Wars: The Force Awakens (2015) as Tasu Leech, and Beyond Skyline (2017) as the police chief. He reprised this role in Skylines (2020).

== Life and career ==
Yayan Ruhian was born in Tasikmalaya, West Java, Indonesia on 19 October 1968. By the age of 13, hoping to "show his masculinity", he began studying the traditional martial art pencak silat; his father had practiced karate. Yayan Ruhian trained with what later became Pencak Silat Tenaga Dasar, eventually becoming a trainer and referee, although he later learned that this disqualified him from participating in tournaments. By the mid-2000s Yayan Ruhian had taught pencak silat in countries such as Belgium, France, and Netherlands, and also learned several further martial arts techniques, such as aikido. He also worked as a hand-to-hand instructor for the Indonesian National Police.

In 2008, Yayan Ruhian was asked by Gareth Evans to help with the choreography for his film Merantau. He also auditioned for the role of Eric, later stating that he did not care if he was cast, so long as he did his best. He received the part, and Merantau was released in 2009. In the film, his character, an antagonistic and diminutive martial artist, is capable of overcoming a considerably larger man in moments. Afterwards, he had several people approach him and ask to study silat, although some called him Eric.

Yayan Ruhian played Mad Dog in Evans' 2011 film The Raid, and handled the fight choreography together with costar Iko Uwais. Evans described the character as "such an unrelenting, cold, irredeemable psychopath that when he kills someone, he wants to feel it", such that he would rather kill a man bare-handed than shoot him. Manohla Dargis of The New York Times described the character as the film's stand-out, "a commanding physical presence".

After this performance, Yayan Ruhian's likeness and the term gereget (used by his character) became a memetic image macro on the internet. In a 2014 interview, Yayan Ruhian stated that he did not mind the memes, as the individuals posting them could not create such macros if they had not seen the film. The magazine Tempo reported in June 2012 that Yayan Ruhian and Iko Uwais had gone to Hollywood to handle choreography for an American remake of the film.

Yayan Ruhian (center) and Julie Estelle (far right) attend the premiere of The Raid 2 at the Sundance Film Festival in 2014.

Gareth Evans' 2014 release, The Raid 2, cast Yayan Ruhian as Prakoso, an assassin and confidant of mafia kingpin Bangun (Tio Pakusadewo). Recognising that Yayan Ruhian had already been identified with Mad Dog, Gareth Evans emphasized that Prakoso was a new character: a failed father and husband, aged sixty, who is nevertheless a faithful employee. As with the earlier film, Yayan worked with Iko Uwais on choreography. Charlotte O'Sullivan of the London Evening Standard found Yayan's portrayal of Prakoso "sublime", writing that "when his body starts flying through the air, you feel as if you're reading his life story".

In mid-2014, it was announced that Yayan Ruhian would appear in Takashi Miike's Yakuza Apocalypse: The Great War of the Underworld, playing alongside Hayato Ichihara as Kyoken. In this film, penned by Yoshitaka Yamaguchi, a Yakuza member is caught in international intrigue after discovering that his boss is a vampire.

In December 2014 it was reported Yayan Ruhian would appear in the Indonesian heist action sequel Comic 8: Casino Kings

He appeared in Star Wars: The Force Awakens (2015) as Tasu Leech, alongside his co-stars from The Raid and The Raid 2 Iko Uwais and Cecep Arif Rahman.

In 2017, he appeared in the alien invasion movie Beyond Skyline where he played a police chief in Laos credited only as the Chief in the movie. In 2020, he reprised this role in Skylines where his character was given the name Huana.

In 2019, he appeared in John Wick: Chapter 3 – Parabellum as Shinobi #2, one of Zero's students, alongside Cecep Arif Rahman as Shinobi #1. He also appeared in the 2019 Malaysian film Wira as Ifrit.

In 2022, he starred in the Malaysian film Mat Kilau as one of the villains Toga, who helps the British conquer Malaya and leads them in the fight against the Pahang villagers in the Pahang Uprising.

In 2022, he appeared in the Indonesian film "Ben and Jody". A film which touches on deforestation, removal of Indigenous peoples from villages and the activism against it.

=== Personal life ===
Yayan Ruhian speaks fluent Sundanese and Indonesian. He also speaks a little conversational English. As of 2017, Yayan Ruhian has three children, who live with his wife in Tasikmalaya. Yayan Ruhian, because of his work, must live in Jakarta. Aside from his acting, he teaches pencak silat. He is also a teacher of inner breathing techniques developed in the Perguruan Silat Tenaga Dasar Indonesia.

== Style ==
On screen, Yayan Ruhian is often cast in antagonistic roles, portraying characters who speak little but have great endurance, stamina and fighting skills.

== Filmography ==
=== Film ===
Year	Title	Role	Notes
2009	Merantau	Eric	
2011	The Raid	Mad Dog	
2014	The Raid 2	Prakoso	
2015	Gangster	Bang Jangkung	
2015	Yakuza Apocalypse	Kyoken (狂犬) / Mad Dog	Japanese debut film
2015	Star Wars: The Force Awakens	Tasu Leech	Cameo, Hollywood debut film
2015	Comic 8: Kings Part 1	The Ghost	
2016	Pre Vis Action	Assassin #1	Short film
2016	Comic 8: Casino Kings Part 2	The Ghost	
2016	Iseng	Edi	
2017	Beyond Skyline	Huana	
2017	Satria Heroes: Revenge of Darkness	Master Torga	
2018	212 Warrior	Mahesa Birawa	As actor and fight choreographer
2019	John Wick: Chapter 3 – Parabellum	Shinobi #2	
2019	Hit And Run	Coki	
2019	Wira	Ifrit	Malaysian debut film
2020	Tarung Sarung	Pak Khalid	
2020	Pasal Kau!	Maman	
2020	Skylines	Huana	
2021	Gas Kuy	Mang Ujang	
2021	Photocopier	Rama's father	
2022	Ben & Jody	Aa Tubir	
2022	Satria Dewa: Gatotkaca	Beceng	
2022	Mat Kilau	Toga	
2022	Ashiap Man	Mister Jamet	
2023	Boy Kills World	Shaman	
2024	Misi Ainaa		Short film
2024	The Shadow Strays	Burai	Cameo
2025	Gayong	Wak Kusang	
2025	The Furious	Tak	Hong Kong debut film
2025	Si Paling Aktor	Himself	
2025	Lone Samurai	Witch	
2026	Gayong 2	Wak Kusang	Cameo
2026	Bluefish		
TBA	Skyline: Warpath	Huana	Post-production
TBA	The Original Gangster	Pablo	Post-production
TBA	Chekau		Post-production
TBA	The Shadow Kills	Burai	Pre-production
TBA	Song of the Sword	Guru Guntur	Pre-production
TBA	Hunter Eleven: The Awaken	Wushua	Pre-production

=== Television series ===
Year	Title	Role	Network	Notes
2018	Mimpi Metropolitan	Himself	MDTV	1 episode
2020	Strike Back: Vendetta	Kabul	Cinemax	1 episode
2023	Who Is Erin Carter?	Moses	Netflix	2 episode

=== Video games ===
Year	Title	Role	Notes	Ref.
2016	Lego Star Wars: The Force Awakens	Tasu Leech	Voice-over	

== Awards and nominations ==
Year	Organisation	Award	Work	Result	Ref.
2010	Indonesian Movie Awards	Best Newcomer Actor	Merantau	Nominated	
2010	Indonesian Movie Awards	Favorite Newcomer Actor	Merantau	Nominated	
2013	Indonesian Movie Awards	Best Supporting Actor	The Raid	Nominated	
2016	Infotainment Awards	Indonesian Celebrity of World Achievement	Yayan Ruhian	Nominated	
2016	Berlin International Filmmaker Festival of World Cinema	Best Lead Actor in a Foreign Film	Iseng	Nominated	
