= The Blob (film series) =

Film franchise article

- Official logo, as released originally in 1958.
- Based on: Original story by Irving H. Millgate
- Distributed by: Paramount Pictures (1958 original); TriStar Pictures (1988 remake)
- Release dates: September 12, 1958 (The Blob); May 21, 1972 (Beware! The Blob); August 5, 1988 (The Blob)
- Country: United States
- Language: English
- Budget: $12,338,776 (3 films)
- Box office: ~$19,350,000 (3 films)

The Blob franchise consists of American science fiction monster-horror films, including the Steve McQueen-led original, its campy comedic sequel, and its remake. Based on an original story by Irving H. Millgate, the plot centers around the invasion of Earth by an amoeboidal alien from outer space that emerges from a meteorite and feasts on anything that it comes into contact with. The story of each installment includes the resistance of the planet's inhabitants, and their attempts to thwart the monster's advances.

The 1958 original film was met initially with mixed critical reception, but was a financial successes at the box office, making a large return for the studio despite its B-movie micro-sized production budget. Becoming more popular than the top-billed film in its debut double feature release, The Blob (1958) has been deemed a horror classic of U.S. cinema, by modern-day critics who cite its influence over contemporary films.

Its 1972 sequel was likewise met with mixed reception from critics, and ultimately lost money at the box office. In the years since, criticisms regarded the change of genre, its comedy style, and the inclusion of hippie plotlines calling it a "relic" of its time; while the cast and their performance were stated as being notable.

The 1988 remake was met with generally positive reviews from critics, but was deemed a box office bomb upon its release. Despite these early reactions, the film has gained a following of fans, and is often regarded as one of the greatest remakes in the history of horror films, earning its classification as a cult classic by modern film critics; some even consider it better than the original.

As of 2015, a reboot film was said to have been in development.

== Films ==
Film	U.S. release date	Director	Screenwriters	Story by	Producer(s)
The Blob	September 12, 1958	Irvin Yeaworth	Kay Linaker & Theodore Simonson	Kay Linaker & Theodore Simonson	Jack H. Harris
Beware! The Blob	June 21, 1972	Larry Hagman	Anthony Harris & Jack Woods	Anthony Harris & Jack Woods	Jack H. Harris and Richard Clair
The Blob	August 5, 1988	Chuck Russell	Chuck Russell & Frank Darabont	Irving H. Millgate	Jack H. Harris and Elliott Kastner
Untitled film	TBA	David Bruckner	David Bruckner	David Bruckner	David S. Goyer and Keith Levine

=== The Blob (1958) ===
The Blob, directed by Irvin Yeaworth, written by Kay Linaker and Theodore Simonson, and starring Steve McQueen and Aneta Corsaut, follows a carnivorous amoeboidal alien that crashes to Earth from outer space inside a meteorite, landing near the small communities of Phoenixville and Downingtown, Pennsylvania, which envelops living beings, growing larger, redder in color, and more aggressive as it moves along.

=== Beware! The Blob (1972) ===
Beware! The Blob, directed by Larry Hagman, written by Anthony Harris and Jack Woods III from a story by Jack H. Harris and Richard Clair, and starring Robert Walker and Gwynne Gilford, follows the titular blob fifteen years on from the events of the previous film, as it is unfrozen by an oblivious pipeline engineer, and teenagers must face off against it as it consumes more and more people.

=== The Blob (1988) ===
The Blob, a remake of the 1958 film directed by Chuck Russell, co-written by Russell with Frank Darabont, and starring Kevin Dillon and Shawnee Smith, follows an acidic, amoeba-like organism that crashes down to Earth in a military satellite, landing near the small community of Arborville, California, and devouring and dissolving anything in its path as it grows.

=== Future ===
In August 2009, it was announced that a reboot of the franchise was in development, with Rob Zombie serving as writer, director, and producer. The filmmaker stated that his adaptation would be different from the original, with a darker tone; stating that his "intention is not to have a big red blobby thing", and that it's "the first thing [he] want[ed] to change". The production was intended to be R-rated, with Zombie stating that it would primarily be a science fiction movie with horror elements. Richard Saperstein, Brian Witten, Jack H. Harris, Judith Parker Harris, and Andy Gould were announced as additional producers on the project. At that time the project was announced to a joint-venture production between The Genre Co., Dimension Films, and Worldwide Entertainment Corporation. Principal photography was scheduled to commence in spring of 2010, with a budget of $30 million total. Zombie later stepped down from the position however, citing creative differences and due to multiple delays. Carey W. Hayes and Chad Hayes wrote the next draft of the script during this time.

In January 2015, the project re-entered development with Simon West signed on as director. Richard Saperstein and Brian Witten were to serve as producers, while producer of the original film, Jack H. Harris would serve as executive producer. The project would utilize CGI special effects to portray the titular monster. Principal photography was tentatively scheduled for that summer. Goldcrest Films, Taewon Entertainment, and A-List Corporation were intended to serve as the production studios, while Goldcrest was intended to distribute the project. West classified the film as a science fiction monster movie featuring alien invasion which would explore the extra terrestrial in greater detail, stating that it would be similar to Alien and Predator. By May 2021, following various degrees of development hell, the project was delayed once more with producers citing the COVID-19 pandemic as one of the reasons. Despite this, the producers filed a lawsuit stating that the coronavirus extends their contract deadline to continue retaining the film rights.

By January 2024, West had stepped down from his role as director, following a resolution to the rights dispute. David Bruckner was hired to write and direct, with David S. Goyer and Keith Levine attached as producers and Judith Harris (the rights holder and widowed-wife of franchise producer) serving as executive producer. The project will be a joint-venture production between Warner Bros. Motion Picture Group, and Phantom Four Films.

== Main cast and characters ==
List indicator

This section includes characters who will appear or have appeared in the franchise in main roles.

- An empty grey cell indicates the character was not in the film, or that the character's official presence has not yet been confirmed.

Character	Original series		Remake
Character	The Blob	Beware! The Blob	The Blob
Character	1958	1972	1988
The Blob	Appears	Appears	Appears
Steven "Steve" Andrews	Steven McQueen		
Jane Martin	Aneta Corsaut		
Lt. Dave Barton	Earl Rowe		
Barney	Olin Howland		
Sgt. Jim Bert	John Benson		
Officer Ritchie	George Karas		
Henry Martin	Elbert Smith		
Mr. Andrews	Hugh Graham		
Elizabeth Martin	Audrey Metcalf		
Bobby Hartford		Robert Walker	
Leslie		Carol Lynley	
Chester Hargis		Godfrey Cambridge	
Lisa Clark		Gwynne Gilford	
Edward Fazio		Richard Stahl	
Sheriff Jones		Richard Webb	
Mariane Hargis		Marlene Clark	
Joe		Gerrit Graham	
Deputy Kelly Javis		J. J. Johnston	
Brian Flagg			Kevin Dillon
Megan "Meg" Penny			Shawnee Smith
Paul Taylor			Donovan Leitch
Sheriff Herb Geller			Jeffrey DeMunn
Deputy Bill Briggs			Paul McCrane
Tom Penny			Art LaFleur
Jennings			Robert Axelrod
Dr. Christopher Meddows			Joe Seneca
Revernd Meeker			Del Close
Fran Hewitt			Candy Clark

== Additional crew and production details ==
Film	Crew/Detail					
Film	Composer(s)	Cinematographer	Editor(s)	Production companies	Distributing company	Running time
The Blob (1958)	Ralph Carmichael & Burt Bacharach	Thomas E. Spalding	Alfred Hillmann	Tonylyn Productions Inc., Valley Forge Films, Fairview Productions	Paramount Pictures	1hr 26mins
Beware! The Blob	Mort Garson	Al Ham	Tony de Zarraga	Jack H. Harris Enterprises Inc.	Jack H. Harris Enterprises Inc.	1hr 31mins
The Blob (1988)	Michael Hoenig & J. Peter Robinson	Mark Irwin	Tod Feuerman & Terry Stokes	Tri-Star Pictures, Palisades California Inc.	TriStar Pictures	1hr 35 mins
Untitled film	TBA	TBA	TBA	Warner Bros. Pictures, Phantom Four Films	Warner Bros. Motion Pictures Group	TBA

== Reception ==
=== Box office and financial performance ===
Film	Box office gross			Box office ranking		Worldwide total home video sales	Worldwide total net income	Budget	Worldwide total gross income/loss	Ref.
Film	North America	Other territories	Worldwide	All time North America	All time worldwide	Worldwide total home video sales	Worldwide total net income	Budget	Worldwide total gross income/loss	Ref.
The Blob (1958)	$4,000,000	—N/a	$4,000,000	information not available	information not available	information not available	>$4,000,000	$110,000	>$3,890,000	
Beware! The Blob	$90,833	—N/a	$90,833	information not available	information not available	$130,777	$221,610	~$240,000	~ -$18,390	
The Blob (1988)	$8,247,943	—N/a	$8,247,943	#5,410	#7,515	information not available	>$8,247,943	$19,000,000	> -$11,000,000	
Totals	$12,338,776	$0	$12,338,776	x̄ #1,803	x̄ #2,505	>$130,777	>$12,469,553	~$19,350,000	~ -$6,880,447	

=== Critical and public response ===
Film	Rotten Tomatoes
The Blob (1958)	68% (31 reviews)
Beware! The Blob	N/A (2 reviews)
The Blob (1988)	71% (31 reviews)

== In other media ==
=== Other films ===
The titular monster from another planet also featured in various other films, namely a number of 3D-styled animated monster-family comedies. DreamWorks Animation movie, Monsters vs. Aliens (2009) includes characters inspired by various '50s "creature" films, while the Sony Pictures Animation Hotel Transylvania franchise, includes incarnations of various Universal Classic Monsters in addition to monsters from other franchises and studios.

Film	U.S. release date	Director(s)	Screenwriters	Story by	Producer(s)	Production studios	Distributing studio
Monsters vs. Aliens	March 27, 2009	Rob Letterman & Conrad Vernon	Maya Forbes & Wallace Wolodarsky and Rob Letterman and Jonathan Aibel & Glenn Berger	Rob Letterman & Conrad Vernon	Lisa Stewart	DreamWorks Animation	Paramount Pictures, DreamWorks Distribution LLC
Hotel Transylvania	September 28, 2012	Genndy Tartakovsky	Peter Baynham & Robert Smigel	Todd Durham and Dan Hageman & Kevin Hageman	Michelle Murdocca	Columbia Pictures, Sony Pictures Animation, Happy Madison Productions	Sony Pictures Releasing, Columbia Pictures
Hotel Transylvania 2	September 25, 2015	Genndy Tartakovsky	Robert Smigel & Adam Sandler	Robert Smigel & Adam Sandler	Michelle Murdocca	Columbia Pictures, LStar Capital, Sony Pictures Animation, MRC, Happy Madison Productions, Sony Pictures Digital, Sony Pictures Imageworks	Sony Pictures Releasing, Columbia Pictures
Hotel Transylvania 3: Summer Vacation	June 13, 2018	Genndy Tartakovsky	Genndy Tartakovsky & Michael McCullers	Genndy Tartakovsky & Michael McCullers	Michelle Murdocca	Sony Pictures Animation, MRC, Happy Madison Productions, Rough Craft Korea	Sony Pictures Releasing, Columbia Pictures
Hotel Transylvania: Transformania	January 14, 2022	Jennifer Kluska & Derek Drymon	Genndy Tartakovsky	Genndy Tartakovsky	Alice Dewey Goldstone	Columbia Pictures, MRC, Sony Pictures Animation	Amazon Prime Video

=== Events ===
Since 1999, a yearly event called Blobfest has been held in Phoenixville, Pennsylvania at the Colonial Theatre as scenes for the film were filmed there, as well as surrounding cities and at the theater. The events celebrate the town's portrayal and appearance in The Blob films, and include: 1950s live music, skit performances, cosplaying by attendees encouraged to dress as characters from the films as well as in the style of the time period, food and drink vendors, souvenir memorabilia, and a reenactment of the "run out" scene featured in the film.

== Legacy ==
=== Analysis ===
In 1997, film historians named Kim R. Holston and Tom Winchester were quoted as noting that The Blob (1958) was a "very famous piece of pop culture is a model of a decent movie on a small budget".

Additionally, the film is recognized by American Film Institute in the following lists:

- 2001: AFI's 100 Years...100 Thrills – Nominated
- 2003: AFI's 100 Years...100 Heroes & Villains - The 50 Greatest Heros & 50 Greatest Villains: "The Blob" – #30 Nominated Villain

=== Influence ===
In a public discussion of cinematic representations of extraterrestrial life, Neil deGrasse Tyson argued that most popular depictions are overly anthropomorphic and therefore biologically implausible. He identified The Blob (1958), an amorphous, amoeba-like organism, that in his view, was a more scientifically credible and personally favorite model of alien life in cinema. Richard Dawkins responded that while radically non-human life forms are possible, extraterrestrial evolution may nonetheless follow patterns similar to those on Earth. He suggested that features such as eyes or defensive structures could plausibly emerge through convergent evolution under comparable environmental pressures.

In computing, a Binary large object or "blob" is classified as a collection of binary data stored as a single file. These "blobs" typically consist of images, audio, other multimedia objects, or a combination of these items. Additionally, sometimes executable code is stored as a "blob". Binary large objects originally were originally non-descript large accumulations of data invented by Jim Starkey at the Digital Equipment Corporation. Starkey later described their function jokingly as "the thing that ate Cincinnati, Cleveland, or whatever...[from] the 1958 Steve McQueen movie", acknowledging that their term refers to The Blob.
