= Beyond Skyline =

2017 science fiction by Liam O'Donnell

- Theatrical release poster
- Directed by: Liam O'Donnell
- Written by: Liam O'Donnell
- Based on: Characters by Joshua Cordes; Liam O'Donnell
- Produced by: Matthew E Chausse; Liam O'Donnell; Colin Strause; Greg Strause
- Starring: Frank Grillo; Bojana Novakovic; Jonny Weston; Callan Mulvey; Iko Uwais; Pamelyn Chee; Yayan Ruhian; Betty Gabriel; Antonio Fargas
- Cinematography: Christopher Probst
- Edited by: Sean Albertson; Banner Gwin
- Music by: Nathan Whitehead
- Production companies: Hydraulx; North Hollywood Films; Infinite Frameworks Studios; Mothership Pictures
- Distributed by: Vertical Entertainment
- Release dates: October 14, 2017 (TADFF); December 15, 2017 (United States (VOD and Digital))
- Running time: 105 minutes
- Country: United States
- Language: English
- Budget: $14 million
- Box office: $992,181

Beyond Skyline is a 2017 American science fiction action film written, co-produced and directed by Liam O'Donnell in his directorial debut. It stars Frank Grillo, Bojana Novakovic, Jonny Weston, Iko Uwais, Callan Mulvey, Yayan Ruhian, Pamelyn Chee, Betty Gabriel, and Antonio Fargas. It is the sequel to the 2010 film Skyline and the second installment in the Skyline film series, set concurrently with the events of the first film.

The film was released on December 15, 2017, in the United States by Vertical Entertainment. Unlike its critically panned predecessor, Beyond Skyline received mixed reviews, with several critics calling it an improvement over the original.

== Plot ==
Mark Corley, a Los Angeles police detective, helps his estranged son, Trent, out of jail just as an alien invasion begins. (Note: This story takes place at the same time as Skyline.) Much of the city's population is taken up into various spaceships by a blue light. Mark leads a group of surviving humans through underground subway tunnels to escape, though most of the humans are killed or abducted. The survivors, Mark, Trent, transit operator Audrey, and homeless man "Sarge" (who is immune to the blue light due to his blindness), escape to the marina following the city's nuclear destruction, only to be abducted into the alien flagship.

On board, Mark tries to find his son and storms his way into various chambers, where he meets up with survivor Elaine and her transformed husband Jarrod. (Note: First introduced in the first film.) Elaine explains that Jarrod retains control of his mind despite being transformed into a bio-mechanical alien soldier. Though Elaine is only three months pregnant, her pregnancy has accelerated and she gives birth to a daughter.

Elaine dies during the delivery, and Mark and Jarrod team up to destroy the ship by setting alien explosives inside the control systems. When Jarrod is killed fighting the alien leader, Mark rescues Audrey but is too late to save his son. Trent has his brain taken and placed in another alien bio-mechanical machine creature. The dying Jarrod destroys the ship, which crashes in rural Laos.

Mark, Audrey, Sarge and the baby escape from the spaceship which starts to repair itself. Sarge dies from his wounds shortly after the group meets Sua and his sister Kanya, who belong to a drug cartel and fight against both aliens and local rogue ex-policemen bandits. While trekking through the jungle, they discover that the human baby grows at an accelerated rate, from an infant into a three-year-old in just one day. Sua and Kanya lead the rest to a hidden human resistance hideout located in local ruins. In addition, the leader of the rogue policemen, Huana, intercepts them but is disarmed and captured by Sua.

Harper, a medical officer and former drug chemist, examines the baby girl and learns about her unique DNA. He believes her blood may be the key to defeating the aliens. Using the child's blood and recovered alien technology, Harper develops the serum that he believes will free the bio-mechanical soldiers from alien control and restore their human personalities.

While on a patrol, Kanya encounters an alien and sacrifices herself by luring it into an old minefield left over from the Vietnam War. The ensuing explosion destroys the alien, but gives away their location to the ships searching for the baby. They converge on the human base. During the resulting battle, several members of the resistance are killed, including Harper. Mark enters an alien ship and uses his serum to turn the mind-controlling blue light into a red light that frees the mind-controlled soldiers. Before he can deploy it, the aliens attack and rip out the cannon containing the light. Sua frees a jailed Huana so that he can fight for the resistance. Mark, Audrey, Sua and Huana then make a last stand to fight back the aliens.

Trent, his mind restored after encountering his father, also fights back. During the battle, the child fixes the cannon, which Trent uses to kill the alien leader and release the red light, freeing the bio-mechanical soldiers. With Earth saved, Audrey names the girl Rose after Mark's deceased wife.

Ten years later, Rose, now a fully-grown adult, has taken control of an alien ship, and Trent is her second-in-command. Rose leads freed bio-mechanical soldiers and humans in an assault on the other alien ships around the Moon, including the mothership.

== Cast ==
- Frank Grillo as Mark Corley, a detective, Trent's father, and Rose's adoptive father.
- Bojana Novakovic as Audrey, an LA transit worker.
- Jonny Weston as Trent Corley, Mark’s estranged son and Rose's adoptive brother.
- Callan Mulvey as Harper, a doctor of the human resistance.
- Iko Uwais as Sua, the leader of an underground human resistance.
- Pamelyn Chee as Kanya, the sister of Sua.
- Yayan Ruhian as Huana, a militia leader.
- Betty Gabriel as Jones, an LA cop.
- Antonio Fargas as Sarge, a blind homeless man.
- Jacob Vargas as Garcia, a police officer and friend of Mark.
- Lindsey Morgan as Captain Rose, leader of the resistance, Mark's adoptive daughter, and Trent's adoptive sister and daughter of the late Jarrod and Elaine.
- Samantha Jean as Elaine, a captive woman and the biological mother of Rose. (originally played by Scottie Thompson in the previous Skyline film)
- Tony Black as Jarrod in a flashback. (originally played by Eric Balfour in the previous Skyline film)

== Production ==
In November 2014, Variety announced that Iko Uwais would join the cast, alongside Frank Grillo, Bojana Novakovic, and Yayan Ruhian. Liam O’Donnell wrote the script for the film, also wrote the script for the first film, will now direct as well as produce with Greg and Colin Strause serving as producers also. The Strause Brothers were the directors of the first film, Skyline. Matthew Chausse will also produce. Uwais and Ruhian will also serve as fight choreographers on the film.

The film's visual effects and production were done by Hydraulx.

=== Filming ===
Principal photography began in December 2014, with shooting in Yogyakarta and Batam, Indonesia. and Toronto, Ontario, Canada. The finale of the film was shot in the Indonesian Prambanan temple complex, though the script suggests that it is located in Laos.

== Release ==
The first film had a PG-13 rating but the sequel was given an R rating by the MPAA. On Alien Day 2017, set photos were released to show what the aliens in Beyond Skyline looked like for the sequel. The first trailer was released on August 16, 2017. The film premiered at Sitges Film Festival October 8, 2017. The film went on to screen at several genre film festivals including Toronto After Dark, Trieste Science+Fiction, Austin Other Worlds, Boston Sci-Fi Film Festival, Rio Grind Vancouver, and was the closing night film at the inaugural Cinepocalypse in Chicago on November 9. Beyond Skyline was released on VOD and Digital on December 15, 2017, and on DVD and Blu-Ray on January 8, 2018.

== Reception ==
As of May 2025, the film holds a 70% approval rating on review aggregator website Rotten Tomatoes, based on 20 reviews with an approval rating of 5.50 out of 10. On Metacritic, the film has a weighted average score of 46 out of 100, based on 8 critics, indicating "mixed or average" reviews.

== Sequels ==
A third film, Skylines, again directed by O'Donnell and produced by the Strause brothers, was released on December 18, 2020.

In January 2024, it was announced XYZ Films had acquired the international rights to the fourth Skyline film, titled Skyline: Warpath.
