= Liam O'Donnell =

American film director, producer, and writer

- Born: 12 April 1982 (age 43); Randolph, Massachusetts
- Occupation(s): Film director, screenwriter, visual effects artist, producer
- Years active: 2010–present

Liam O'Donnell (born April 12, 1982) is an American film director, producer, writer and special effects artist.

== Career ==
O'Donnell graduated from Boston University in 2004, and shortly thereafter worked with Greg and Colin Strause, the owners of Hydraulx VFX. Most notable movies, he was responsible for visual effects, are Aliens vs. Predator: Requiem, Iron Man 2 and The Bay.

O'Donnell wrote and produced the 2010 film Skyline.

In 2017, O'Donnell wrote and produced his directorial debut, Beyond Skyline, the sequel to Skyline. O'Donnell would return to direct another sequel with Skylines (2020).

In June 2021, it was announced O'Donnell will direct The Wreck, a shark attack thriller about a group of old college friends who reunite on a Caribbean scuba diving trip exploring the wreckage of a WWII battleship and find themselves trapped inside the underwater labyrinth of rusted metal surrounded by great white sharks. The film began production in Malta in September 2021.

== Filmography ==
=== Films ===
Year	Title	Director	Writer	Producer	Notes
2010	Skyline	No	Yes	Yes	
2012	The Bay	No	No	Co-producer	
2017	Beyond Skyline	Yes	Yes	Yes	
2019	Go to Sleep: A Lao Ghost Story	No	Yes	Yes	Short film
2019	Portals	Yes	Yes	Yes	
2020	Skylines	Yes	Yes	Yes	
2025	Skyline: Warpath	Yes	Yes	No	
TBA	Merciless	Yes	No	Yes	
