= Randall Bacon =

American actor

Randall J. Bacon
- Born: San Jose
- Occupations: Actor and Producer
- Years active: 2008 - present
- Known for: Agents of Shield
- Title: Co-Founder of One Doallar Studios
- Website: www.onedollarstudios.com

Randall Bacon is an American actor and former football player.

Bacon played high school football in Sacramento, California before attending college and playing for the Texas A&M University-Kingsville Javalinas. Following his football career, he transitioned to acting and has performed in TV and film including roles in series like All My Children, The Young and the Restless, Scream Queens, and Marvel's Agents of S.H.I.E.L.D. along with the film Rz-9.

Bacon works as a commercial body double for Denver Broncos quarterback Russell Wilson. He is part of "The Team That Never Plays" profiled in Sports Illustrated.

== Filmography ==
Year	Title	Role	Notes
2015	Rz-9	Soldier	
2018	Brampton's Own	Diego Alomar	
2025	Skyline: Warpath	TBA	
2025	Hunting Seaston	Dale	

=== Television ===
Year	Title	Role	Notes
2011	All My Children	Police Officer	Soap Opera (2 episodes)
2012-14	The Young and the Restless	Cop/Officer Brooks	Soap Opera (7 episodes)
2015	Scream Queens	Guy #1	TV series
2017	Agents of S.H.I.E.L.D.	Lead Hydra Agent	TV series
