= Skyline: Warpath =

Upcoming film

- Directed by: Liam O'Donnell
- Written by: Liam O'Donnell
- Produced by: Matthew E Chausse; Evangelo Kioussis
- Starring: Iko Uwais; Scott Adkins; Louis Mandylor; Randall Bacon; Yayan Ruhian
- Cinematography: John Radel
- Edited by: Robert Sealey
- Music by: Ram Khat
- Production company: XYZ Films
- Countries: United States; United Kingdom; France; Indonesia
- Language: English

Skyline: Warpath is an unreleased science fiction action film written and directed by Liam O'Donnell. It stars Iko Uwais, Scott Adkins, Louis Mandylor, Randall Bacon and Yayan Ruhian. It is the fourth installment in the Skyline film series, a spin-off narratively set between the second and third films in the series.

The film was scheduled to premiere at Fantastic Fest on October 6–9, 2025, but did not play at the festival and remains unreleased.

== Premise ==
Set five years after the events of the second film Beyond Skyline, Sua discovers the powerful Radial Gauntlet, as he must deal with the corrupt Eric and the army of alien invaders.

== Cast ==
- Iko Uwais as Sua, the leader of an underground human resistance
- Scott Adkins as Eric Corley
- Louis Mandylor
- Randall Bacon
- Yayan Ruhian as Huana
- Lutesha

== Production ==
In December 2020, Frank Grillo expressed interest in reprising his role in the series. By August 2021, O'Donnell announced that he had finished writing the script, while revealing the official title to be Skyline Radial. The filmmaker stated that the plot will include a father/daughter reunion plot, while acknowledging that he may have some rewrites to complete in the future.

In May 2022, it was announced that O'Donnell will once again serve as writer/director for the new movie. The filmmaker stated that he views the installment as the Fast Five or The Avengers equivalent in the film series, where various characters from previous movies will team up for a "bigger...sci-fi martial arts adventure." Principal photography was scheduled to commence later that year, with Screen Media acting as the international distribution sales company in collaboration with its parent company Chicken Soup for the Soul Entertainment, while a distributor would be determined following a presence at the 2022 Cannes Film Festival. Grillo and Lindsey Morgan are slated to reprise their respective roles, with the plot centering around Col. Rose Corley hiring a crew with a planned mission of freeing her father Det. Mark Corley from an alien prison; while coming into conflict with the most powerful force in the universe, an alien race called The Radial.

The Radial shoot had to be postponed due to Writers and Actors strikes and the film was pushed to fifth in the series.

In January 2024, it was announced that a spinoff film Skyline: Warpath set between films two and three had commenced principal photography in Indonesia. Iko Uwais returned as Sua, now in a headlining role, with Scott Adkins, Louis Mandylor, Randall Bacon, and Yayan Ruhian joining the cast. XYZ Films will distribute the movie domestically.

== Release ==
Skyline: Warpath was scheduled to be released in the United States in 2025. As of 2026 it remains unreleased.
