= Hydraulx =

American visual effects company

hy*drau"lx
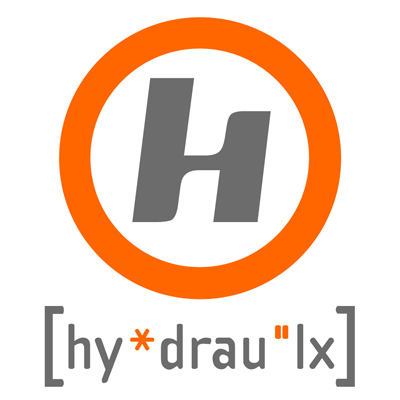
- Type: Private
- Industry: Visual effects; Animation
- Founded: 2002; 24 years ago
- Founder: Greg and Colin Strause
- Headquarters: Santa Monica, California, U.S.
- Number of locations: Vancouver, British Columbia, Canada; New Orleans, Louisiana, U.S.
- Products: Visual effects
- Divisions: Hydraulx Entertainment
- Website: www.hydraulx.com

hy*drau"lx, alternatively spelled HYDRAULX and Hydraulx, is an American visual effects (VFX) company based in Santa Monica, California.

== History ==
Hydraulx was founded in 2002 by Greg and Colin Strause, directors of Aliens vs. Predator: Requiem. In 2005, the studio completed over 700 visual effects shots for feature films. The company is based in Santa Monica, California.

In 2010, the company produced their own feature film, Skyline, which was also directed by the Strause brothers. That film would result in a lawsuit against the brothers by Sony Pictures Entertainment. The suit alleged that the brothers diverted resources meant for their work on Battle: Los Angeles to Skyline. Shortly after the release of Battle, Sony dropped their lawsuit, claiming they were satisfied that none of the brothers' work on that film ended up in Skyline.

Hydraulx was one of thirteen companies that worked on the 2011 film Captain America: The First Avenger.

In 2012 the company did effects work on The Avengers.

== Filmography ==
=== Films ===
Year	Title	Notes
2003	Terminator 3: Rise of the Machines	
2003	Looney Tunes: Back in Action	
2004	Torque	
2004	The Day After Tomorrow	
2005	Constantine	
2005	XXX: State of the Union	
2005	The Adventures of Sharkboy and Lavagirl in 3-D	
2005	Fantastic Four	
2005	Venom	
2005	The Fog	
2005	Syriana	
2005	Æon Flux	
2006	Poseidon	
2006	X-Men: The Last Stand	
2006	Little Man	
2006	300	
2007	Shooter	
2007	Fantastic Four: Rise of the Silver Surfer	
2007	Nancy Drew	
2007	The Invasion	
2007	The Seeker	
2007	Aliens vs. Predator: Requiem	Directed by the Brothers Strause
2008	Jumper	
2008	Meet Dave	
2008	The Incredible Hulk	
2008	Wanted	
2008	Australia	
2008	The Day the Earth Stood Still	
2008	The Curious Case of Benjamin Button	
2008	Bedtime Stories	
2009	Fast & Furious	
2009	X-Men Origins: Wolverine	
2009	Aliens in the Attic	
2009	Case 39	
2009	2012	
2009	Avatar	
2010	The Book of Eli	
2010	Tooth Fairy	
2010	Percy Jackson & the Olympians: The Lightning Thief	Additional visual effects
2010	Iron Man 2	
2010	Marmaduke	
2010	The A-Team	
2010	Get Him to the Greek	
2010	Knight and Day	
2010	Jonah Hex	
2010	The Town	
2010	The Social Network	Additional visual effects
2010	Skyline	Also a production company Directed by the Brothers Strause
2010	Gulliver's Travels	
2011	Battle: Los Angeles	
2011	Pirates of the Caribbean: On Stranger Tides	
2011	X-Men: First Class	Additional visual effects
2011	Green Lantern	
2011	Captain America: The First Avenger	
2011	Take Shelter	Also a production company
2012	The Avengers	
2012	What to Expect When You're Expecting	
2012	Snow White and the Huntsman	
2012	Looper	
2013	Don Jon	
2013	The Hangover Part III	
2014	X-Men: Days of Future Past	
2014	Into the Storm	
2015	San Andreas	
2015	Hardcore Henry	
2016	Midnight Special	
2016	X-Men: Apocalypse	
2016	Max Steel	
2016	Spectral	
2017	Baywatch	
2017	Death Note	
2017	Geostorm	
2017	Beyond Skyline	
2018	Rampage	
2018	The Predator	
2020	Skylines	

=== TV series ===
Year	Title	Notes
2005–2020	Criminal Minds	
2016–2025	Stranger Things	

=== Music videos ===
- Usher "Love In This Club"
- Usher "Moving Mountains"
- Tool "Schism", "Parabol/Parabola" and "Vicarious"
- A Perfect Circle "Weak and Powerless" and "Passive"
- Korn "Freak on a Leash"
- Snoop Dogg "Drop it Like it's Hot"
- U2 "Elevation"
- Linkin Park "Crawling"
- Will Smith "Black Suit's Comin"
- Powerman 5000 "Bombshell"
- Britney Spears "Stronger"
- Godsmack "I Stand Alone"
- Jennifer Lopez "Play"
- Aerosmith "Jaded"
- P.O.D. "Alive"
- Shakira "Wherever Wherever"
- Jet "Are You Gonna Be My Girl"
- Papa Roach "Between Angels and Insects"
- Disturbed "Prayer"
- Taproot "Poem"

=== Commercials ===
- Scion "tC"
- Scion "xA"
- Scion "xB"
- Mercury Mariner "Hybrid", "Soundwave", "Attraction"
- Lincoln "Landmarks"
- Gatorade "Winning Formula"
- Ford F150 "Kiln"
- Jeep Grand Cherokee "Reflection"
- Coca-Cola/World of WarCraft "WOW Be Yourself"
- United States Marine Corps "Diamond"
- Fresca "Dance"
- Nike Stickman campaign: "Hoops", "Frisbee", "Football" and "Pool"
- PlayStation 2's God of War "Gods" and "Monsters"
- Toyota Matrix "Sunglasses"
- Toyota Corolla "Imagination"
- Universal Studios "Creep" and "Scare"
- Norfolk Southern "Trees"
