= The Bay (film) =

- Theatrical film poster
- Directed by: Barry Levinson
- Screenplay by: Michael Wallach
- Story by: Barry Levinson; Michael Wallach
- Produced by: Barry Levinson; Jason Blum; Steven Schneider; Oren Peli
- Starring: Will Rogers; Kristen Connolly; Kether Donohue; Frank Deal; Stephen Nunken; Christopher Denham; Nansi Aluka
- Cinematography: Josh Nussbaum
- Edited by: Aaron Yanes
- Music by: Marcelo Zarvos
- Production companies: Baltimore Pictures; Haunted Movies; Alliance Films; IM Global; Hydraulx Entertainment; Automatik Entertainment
- Distributed by: Roadside Attractions (United States); Alliance Films (Canada)
- Release dates: September 13, 2012 (TIFF); November 2, 2012 (United States)
- Running time: 85 minutes
- Countries: United States; Canada
- Language: English
- Budget: $2 million
- Box office: $1.6 million

The Bay is a 2012 found footage horror film directed by Barry Levinson and written by Michael Wallach, based on an original story created by the duo. It stars Kether Donohue, Nansi Aluka, Christopher Denham, Frank Deal and Kristen Connolly and premiered at the 2012 Toronto International Film Festival.

It was released in theaters on November 2, 2012. To date, it is Levinson's only horror film.

== Plot ==
The opening text explains that the footage shown was confiscated by the U.S. government in 2009, until an anonymous source leaked it for the entire world to see.

Claridge, a town located on Maryland's Eastern Shore, thrives on its water supply. Consequently, the nearby chicken farm has come under fire for polluting the Chesapeake Bay by dumping chicken excrement and other toxins into the water. As rookie reporter Donna Thompson covers a local Fourth of July celebration, dozens of citizens fall violently ill and exhibit severe lesions. Overwhelmed with patients, Dr. Jack Abrams, the head of the Atlantic Hospital, contacts the CDC, which initially believes a viral outbreak is the cause. The town descends into chaos as people begin dying en masse within hours: the first casualty is reported by Claridge police that afternoon. Later on, a 911 call is made by a distraught woman reporting that her neighbor is wandering on her property, covered in boils and screaming in agony. Teenager Denise Button and her boyfriend are attacked and killed by an unknown animal while swimming in a creek. Their bodies are never found, but a 12-year-old discovers the camera that documented the incident. Meanwhile, several citizens report bizarre symptoms, including the feeling of bugs in their bodies.

A few months before the outbreak, oceanographers Sam and Jaqueline discovered high toxicity levels in the bay. After encountering multiple fish eaten from the inside out, they realized that the true culprit was massive, mutated tongue-eating lice. The bay water was polluted by massive amounts of excrement from chickens, who were fed steroids for rapid growth. Because of this, the isopods proliferated tremendously, killing off millions of fish and causing 40% of the bay to become lifeless. The lesions result from the isopods eating their hosts from the inside out. Sam and Jaqueline attempted to alert city authorities, but the mayor, John Stockman, ignored the warnings. A swarm of fully-grown isopods eventually killed Sam and Jaqueline and their bodies were later discovered.

The Talmet family, consisting of Alex, Stephanie, and their infant son Andrew, sail to Claridge, unaware of the danger, as the town has been forcibly quarantined and local law enforcement has shut down cell towers. The isopods have also infected Stephanie's parents. Two deputies, Jimson and Paul, answer a call concerning someone screaming in pain; in a digitally enhanced audio recording, Jimson encounters an infected family begging to be killed. Having gone insane from seeing what has happened, he euthanizes them and subsequently murders Paul after one of the isopods bites him. After being confronted by Stockman and Sheriff Lee Roberts, the lesion-covered Jimson kills Roberts and himself. Stockman attempts to flee in Roberts' police car, only to be killed in a collision.

The CDC eventually learns that the water in Claridge has a considerable radioactive rating. The CDC contacts the White House upon learning about the mutated isopods. Dr. Abrams is told that no additional help is forthcoming and that he and the staff should evacuate. Abrams reveals that he is the sole surviving staff member at the hospital but refuses to leave. Upon realizing that he, too, is now infected, he uses his final hours to document the mass of dead bodies within the hospital. Meanwhile, the CDC contacts the DHS, who reveal that they had received the report about the oceanographers but did not report it immediately because they did not want to cause undue panic. They wrote off the chaos as happening in a "small town" and refused to offer help.

Donna and her cameraman, Jim Hoyt, continue to document the carnage despite her station's blog being shut down by the FBI. Donna, in narration, reveals that after fleeing Claridge, she never reported anything else and that Jim later died. The Talmets arrive to find the town mostly deserted, with corpses littering the street. Horrified, they manage to contact a friend, Bill, on Skype to ask for help. However, Alex, who swam in the bay earlier, is infected and dies from isopods crawling out of his neck, while Stephanie escapes unharmed with Andrew. They are frightened by a still-living woman hiding in a police car who begs for help before Stephanie hits her, accidentally snapping her neck.

Years later, Donna leaks the gathered footage, revealing that the government managed to kill the isopods by filling the water with chlorine; they then covered up the incident as the result of "unusually high water temperatures" and paid off the few survivors (including Donna) in exchange for silence. She then reveals that Stephanie still lives but refuses to participate in the film. The movie ends with shots of civilians innocently enjoying the bay water, unaware of the dangers, as 40% of the bay remains lifeless.

== Cast ==
- Kether Donohue as Donna Thompson
- Kristen Connolly as Stephanie Talmet
- Will Rogers as Alex Talmet
- Stephen Kunken as Dr. Jack Abrams
- Robert Treveiler as Dr. Williams
- Nansi Aluka as Jaqueline
- Christopher Denham as Sam
- Frank Deal as Mayor John Stockman
- Brandon Hanson as Jim Hoyt
- Michael Beasley as Deputy Jimson
- Jody Thompson as Deputy Paul
- Andrew Stahl as Sheriff Lee Roberts
- Tara Polhemus as Denise Button
- Jennifer Burch as Jennifer
- Jane McNeill as Victim #1

== Production ==
The film came about as a result of a documentary Barry Levinson was asked to produce about problems facing the Chesapeake Bay. Although Levinson chose to abandon the documentary upon learning that Frontline already covered the same issue, Levinson instead decided to use the research to produce a horror film which he hoped would shed light on the issues facing Chesapeake. As such when promoting the film he noted that it's "80 percent factual information."

According to writer Michael Wallach, the script originally started out as a short story about a young couple who comes across a dead town. After having pieced together what happened from footage scattered across town, they realize the town had not fully died yet. Levinson was happy with the script, and sent Wallach the movie JFK: 3 Shots That Changed America and asked if the movie could be made into a documentary.

Levinson chose to use the found footage format after thinking about the Pompeii disaster and noting that if such a disaster happened today there would be much more evidence of what happened with him telling Yahoo! "For the very first time in history, you can get a picture of that town, if you collect all the footage from everyone's cell phones and their digital cameras and the Skypes, and the texting and everything else" A byproduct of the format was that much of the footage was able to be shot by the actors themselves as opposed to a more traditional camera crew. According to Levinson roughly one third of the film was shot this way.

Though the film is set in Levinson's home state of Maryland, it was shot on locations in North Carolina and South Carolina.

== Reception ==
The film has received generally positive reviews from critics, with a 76% approval rating and an average rating of 6.5 out of 10 on review aggregator Rotten Tomatoes, based on 86 reviews. The website's critical consensus states that "Barry Levinson's eco-horror flick cleverly utilizes familiar found-footage methods in service of a gruesome yet atmospheric chiller." It also holds a score of 65 out of 100 on Metacritic, based on 20 reviewers. David Cox of The Guardian awarded the film five out of five, and called it a "horror film for grown ups". Roger Ebert of the Chicago Sun-Times, however, was less positive, awarding the film two-and-a-half out of a possible four, stating "Although there are some scary moments here, and a lot of gruesome ones, this isn't a horror film so much as a faux eco-documentary".
