= Bumilangit Cinematic Universe =

Indonesian shared fictional universe

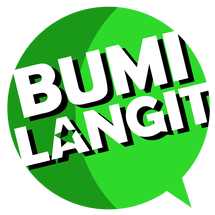
- Bumilangit Cinematic Universe
- Based on: Characters published by Bumilangit
- Production company: Screenplay Bumilangit
- Country: Indonesia
- Languages: Indonesian; Javanese

The Bumilangit Cinematic Universe (BCU) (Indonesian: Jagat Sinema Bumilangit) is an Indonesian media franchise and shared universe centered on a series of superhero films produced by Bumilangit Studios based on characters that appear in comic books published by Bumilangit. Volume 1 of the series began with Gundala in 2019 and will conclude with the release of a team-up film Patriot.

Joko Anwar was announced as the executive producer that will oversee the development of all films in Volume 1 of the series. He wrote and directed Gundala as well as co-wrote Sri Asih.

== Development ==
The development of the film series came on the heel of the success of Disney's Marvel Cinematic Universe franchise. The production of several films into planned volumes with individual superhero films released before a team-up film resembles the strategy employed by Marvel Studios.

During a Disney+ event in 2020, President of Marvel Studios Kevin Feige spoke with the Bumilangit Cinematic Universe executive producer Joko Anwar and expressed support for the Indonesian superhero franchise while saying that the project is "in the right hands".

Production of several films in the franchise faced delays upon the onset of the COVID-19 pandemic in Indonesia.

== Background ==
The Bumilangit Universe in the comic book series began in the ancient times and continue well into present day. It is divided into four eras:

- The Legends era, set after the volcanic eruption of Mount Toba which pushed humans to near extinction and revolve around three fictional kingdoms that lead the recovery of human civilizations: the Kingdom of Wiba with its advanced scientific achievements, the Kingdom of Godam with its strong warriors, and the Kingdom of Rawaya with its spiritual devotion.
- The Swordsmen era, set in the 17th century with key characters who are known for their swordsmanship, such as Mandala, Barda Mandrawata, Purnama Wulan Dewi Sartikawati, Selendang Mayang, and Rahayu.
- The Patriot era, with characters such as Mardhanus, Nani Wijaya, Sancaka, and Adam.
- The Revolution era, set in present day.

== Films ==
Film	Release date	Director	Screenwriter(s)	Producer(s)	Ref.
Volume 1
Gundala	August 28, 2019	Joko Anwar	Joko Anwar	Sukhdev Singh, Wicky V. Olindo & Bismarka Kurniawan	Released
Sri Asih	November 17, 2022	Upi	Joko Anwar & Upi	Wicky V. Olindo, Bismarka Kurniawan & Joko Anwar	Released
Virgo and the Sparklings	March 2, 2023	Ody C. Harahap	Rafki Hidayat & Johanna Wattimena	Wicky V. Olindo, Bismarka Kurniawan & Joko Anwar	Released
Godam & Tira	2026 or ?	Zahir Omar	TBA	TBA	Post-production
The Blind of the Phantom Cave	TBA	Timo Tjahjanto	Timo Tjahjanto	TBA	Pre-production
Mandala: The Devil's Sword	TBA	TBA	TBA	TBA	Pre-production
Gundala the Son of Lightning	TBA	Joko Anwar	TBA	TBA	Pre-production
Patriot	TBA	TBA	TBA	TBA	Pre-production

=== Gundala (2019) ===
Sancaka, an astraphobic son of an Indonesian factory worker who's now a security guard and mechanic in a newspaper printing factory, uses his superpowers to defeat the corrupt crime boss Pengkor. After his allies poison a large shipment of rice, Pengkor uses his undue political influence to force the local legislature's hand in passing a bill to approve the hasty production and distribution of an unproven antidote – unknowingly made by a pharmaceutical company he secretly owns – that will ultimately harm pregnant women.

Bumilangit Studios, as the owner of Gundala's intellectual property, has been developing the idea of making a Gundala movie since 2014. The search for the right director and scriptwriter for Gundala was not easy, and took Bumilangit years to finally find the perfect match. On April 4, 2018, Joko Anwar was announced as the writer and the director for the film. He is one of Indonesia's most prolific and celebrated film directors.

Joko Anwar admitted that the scriptwriting process for Gundala has been the hardest work of his career so far. Usually, he spends one to two months on a typical script, but he eventually ended up spending a total of seven months for this project. Reinterpreting Gundala's origin from the original 1969 comic, he reworked the story in a way that could attract millennials and Gen Z. Hasmi's comics and notes about Gundala helped him write the script.

The film stars Abimana Aryasatya as Sancaka/Gundala, alongside Tara Basro, Bront Palarae, Ario Bayu, Cecep Arif Rahman, Rio Dewanto, and Muzakki Ramdhan. The film received positive reviews from the audience and critics with praise for Abimana's performance, Anwar's direction, and the visual effects, costume design, and originality. Throughout its domestic run, the film garnered over 1.6 million admissions, with an estimate gross of $4.7 million.

=== Sri Asih (2022) ===
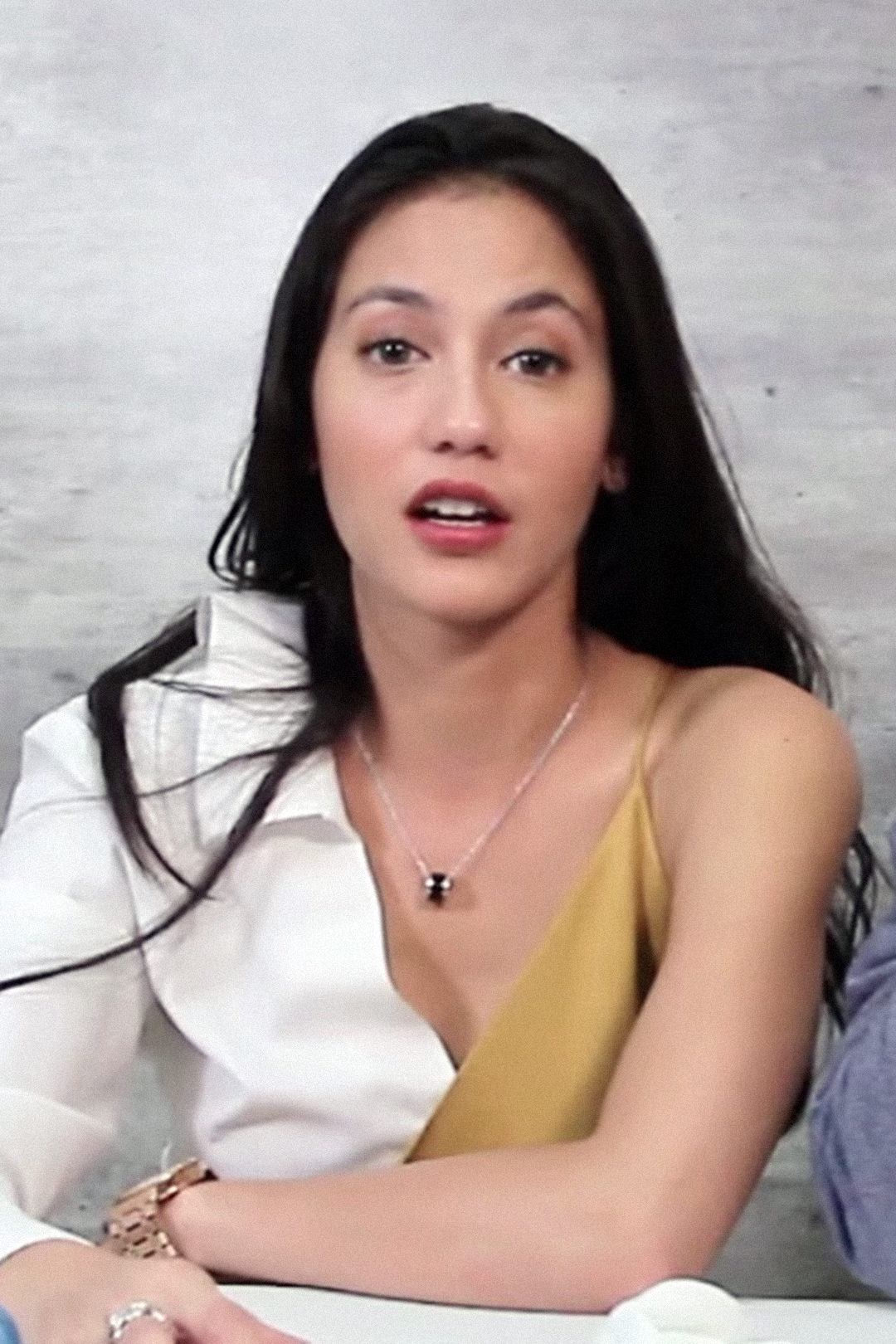
Pevita Pearce would portray Alana / Sri Asih in Bumilangit Cinematic Universe.

Alana didn't understand why she was always overcome by anger. But she always tried to fight it. She was born during a volcanic eruption that separated her from her parents. She is then adopted by a rich woman who tries to help her live a normal life. As an adult, Alana discovers the truth about her origins. She's not an ordinary human. She can be good or be evil if she can not control her anger.

On December 7, 2019, Joko Anwar as the creative producer of Bumilangit Cinematic Universe announced that Pevita Pearce would play Sri Asih in Bumilangit Cinematic Universe after her first appearance at the ending of Gundala (2019). The film also stars Christine Hakim as Eyang Mariani, Surya Saputra as Prayogo Adinegara, Jefri Nichol as Tangguh, Reza Rahadian as Jatmiko, Randy Pangalila as Mateo Adinegara, Jenny Zhang as Sarita Hamzah, Dimas Anggara as Kala, Revaldo as Jagau, Faradina Mufti as Renjana, Fadly Faisal as Gilang, Messi Gusti as Young Alana and a special appearance by Najwa Shihab as Nani Wijaya, the first Sri Asih. The film was directed by Upi, written by Upi and Joko Anwar.

In Indonesian history of fiction literature, Sri Asih is the first hero to appear in Indonesian comics. Sri Asih first appeared about half a century ago, in 1953. Its creator, R.A. Kosasih is recognized as the “Father of Indonesian Comics.”

The shooting process began on November 18, 2020, and finished on April 1, 2021. On July 6, 2022, Sri Asih released her first teaser trailer. The film was released in cinemas on November 17, 2022 as the second entry of BCU.

== Web series ==
Year	Title	Director	Notes
2023	Tira	Zahir Omar	Disney+ Original

== Main cast and characters ==
Volume 1
Character	Gundala	Sri Asih	Virgo and the Sparklings	Godam & Tira	The Blind of the Phantom Cave	Mandala: The Devil's Sword	Gundala the Son of Lightning	Patriot
Character	2019	2022	2023	2025	TBA			
=== Introduced in Gundala ===
Sancaka Gundala	Abimana Aryasatya Muzakki Ramdhan^{Y}	Abimana Aryasatya^{C}					Abimana Aryasatya	
Sedhah Esti Wulan Merpati	Tara Basro						Tara Barso	
Pengkor	Bront Palarae Zayen Aqilah^{Y}						TBA	
Ghani "Ghazul" Zulham	Ario Bayu						Ario Bayu	
Ridwan Bahri	Lukman Sardi		Lukman Sardi^{C}				TBA	Lukman Sardi
Awang Godam	Faris Fadjar Munggaran	Chicco Jerikho^{C}		Chicco Jerikho				Chicco Jerikho
Motila / Camar Cantika the Nurse	Hannah Al Rashid							Hannah Al Rashid
Purnama Wulan Dewi Sartikawati / Eagle-Eyed Angel Mutiara Jenar the Model	Kelly Tandiono				Kelly Tandiono			Kelly Tandiono
Desti Nikita the Student	Asmara Abigail							
Swara Batin the Dancer	Cecep Arif Rahman							
Kamal Atmaja the Hypnotherapist	Ari Tulang							
Tanto Ginanjar the Blacksmith	Daniel Adnan							
Kanigara the Painter	Cornelio Sunny							
Jack Mandagi the Chef	Andrew Suleiman							
Sam Buadi the Carver	Aming Sugandhi							
Adi Sulaiman the Composer	Rendra Bagus Pamungkas							
Ki Wilawuk	Sujiwo Tejo^{C}							Sujiwo Tejo
Alana Sri Asih	Pevita Pearce^{C}	Pevita Pearce Keinaya Messi Gusti^{Y}						Pevita Pearce
=== Introduced in Sri Asih ===
Roh Setan Jatmiko		Reza Rahadian						TBA
Eyang Mariani		Christine Hakim						TBA
Tangguh Sembrani		Jefri Nichol Quentin Stanisvlaki^{Y}						TBA
Kala		Dimas Anggara						
Prayogo Adinegara		Surya Saputra						
Sarita Hamzah		Jenny Zhang						
Mateo Adinegara		Randy Pangalila						
Jagau		Revaldo						
Renjana		Faradina Mufti						
Gilang		Fadly Faisal						
Ratna Kumala Kepala polisi		Unique Priscilla						
Leon Teman Mateo		Abdurrahman Arif						
Nani Wijaya Sri Asih		Najwa Shihab^{C}						TBA
The Fire Goddess		Dian Sastrowardoyo^{C}						Dian Sastrowardoyo
=== Introduced in Virgo and the Sparklings ===
Riani Virgo			Adhisty Zara					Adhisty Zara
Leo			Bryan Domani					
Carmine			Mawar Eva de Jongh Najla Sulistyo Putri^{Y}					
Monica			Ashira Zamita					
Ussy			Satine Zaneta					
Sasmi			Rebecca Klopper					
Ranti			Indahkus					
Hannah			Mentari Novel					
Cempaka			Vanesha Prescilla^{C}					Vanesha Prescilla
=== Introduced in Godam & Tira ===
Suci Tira				Chelsea Islan				Chelsea Islan
=== Introduced in The Blind of the Phantom Cave ===
Barda Mandrawata					Iko Uwais			Iko Uwais
Mandala					Joe Taslim^{C}	Joe Taslim		Joe Taslim
=== Introduced in Patriot ===
Mardhanus Aquanus								Nicholas Saputra

== Powers and abilities ==
Character	Creator	Powers and abilities
Sancaka Gundala	Harya Suraminata	Generate lightning bolts, lightning punch, and superhuman speed.
Sedhah Esti Wulan Merpati	Harya Suraminata	Flight, superhuman navigation sense, and superhuman strength equal to 20 male adults.
Nani Wijaya Sri Asih	R. A. Kosasih	Superhuman strength equal to 250 male adults, flight, martial arts, body enlargement, and body multiplication.
Cempaka	R. A. Kosasih	Martial arts
Awang Godam	Wid N. S.	Superhuman strength, supersonic flight, and supersonic speed.
Mardhanus Aquanus	Wid N. S.	Swim faster than any aquatic life forms and possess a belt that could blast powerful rainbow rays.
Motila Camar	Wid N. S.	Communications with birds, martial arts, and superhuman leap.
Barda Mandrawata Si Buta dari Gua Hantu	Ganes T. H.	Sword and stick fighting, martial arts, and superhuman senses.
Mandala	Mansyur Daman	Martial arts, sword fighting, and an ability to crush rocks without physical contact (named the 'rock tidal wave' technique).
Purnama Wulan Dewi Sartikawati Eagle-Eyed Angel	Mansyur Daman	Martial arts using a chain whip with sharp blade at its end as weapon.
Susie Tira	Nono G. M.	Martial arts, high-tech combat gadgets, and ability to summon mystical spirits.
Rini/Riani Virgo	Jan Mintaraga; Annisa Nisfihani; Ellie Goh	Generate scorching fire flames from her hands, and ability to see or feel certain colors when listening to music (named the 'Synesthesia').

== Main villains ==
The film producers have not confirmed the villain character that will be the main enemy in the film series. However, a scene in Gundala depicting Ghazul (Ario Bayu) summoning the ancient figure Ki Wilawuk (Sujiwo Tejo) led to speculations that the character will serve as the mega-villain for the superhero team-up in later film. But later in the second film of the cinematic universe, Sri Asih, it was revealed that Ki Wilawuk was only one of the five commanders of the suspected ultimate villain namely The Fire Goddess (Dewi Api) who has been sealed for centuries in an unknown volcano by her nemesis, Dewi Asih. These five commanders need to be resurrected in order to free her from the captive and spread terror to the entire world.

Film	Main villain	Portrayed by
Gundala	Pengkor	Bront Palarae
Sri Asih	Roh Setan	Reza Rahadian
Virgo and the Sparklings	Carmine	Mawar De Jongh
Godam & Tira	TBA	TBA
The Blind of the Phantom Cave: Angel's Eyes	TBA	TBA
Mandala: The Devil's Sword	TBA	TBA
Gundala the Son of Lightning	TBA	TBA
Patriot	TBA	TBA

== See also ==
- Satria Dewa Universe, another Indonesian superhero film franchise
- Superhero film, a film genre
