= Sri Asih =

Sri Asih may refer to:

- Sri Asih (character), an Indonesian comics character
  - Sri Asih (1954 film), based on the comic, directed by Tan Sing Hwat and Turino Djunaedy
  - Sri Asih (2022 film), based on the comic, directed by Upi
