= Indonesia Comic Con =

Comic-based multigenre convention in Jakarta, Indonesia

- Status: Active
- Genre: Multigenre convention
- Venue: Jakarta International Expo
- Location: Jakarta
- Country: Indonesia
- Inaugurated: 14 November 2015
- Most recent: 3–4 October 2026
- Previous event: 25–26 October 2025
- Organizer: Panorama Media
- Website: indonesiacomiccon.com

Indonesia Comic Con (abbreviated as ICC, simplified as Indo Comic Con) is an annual comic-based multigenre convention in Jakarta, Indonesia, established in 2015. It is organized by Panorama Media (formerly Reed Panorama Exhibitions), the subsidiary of Panorama Sentrawisata, an Indonesian tourism service provider company. ICC emphasizes the five pillars of pop culture, namely comics, toys, movies, video games, and lifestyles. It has featured numbers of notable international actors and actresses, as well as comic artists, DJs, VTubers, and professional cosplayers.

ICC is the intermediary for Jakartans to express their interest and love in pop culture with full of passion. It is made to support and gather all creative industry players—from comic and anime artists, movie fans, gamers and e-sport players, and also music lovers—in one convention. Despite being a multi-genre convention, ICC is more focused on western pop culture, as it has already launched a spin-off event named Indonesia Anime Con, a separated anime and manga convention in 2024.

== Overview ==
Deputy Minister of Creative Economy of Indonesia, Irene Umar during a press conference at the 2026 edition

Indonesia Comic Con debuted on 14 November 2015, held annually in October or November. Until 2025, ICC was held at the Jakarta International Convention Center (JICC) (Note: Formerly named the Jakarta Convention Center (JCC) until the eighth edition in 2024.) in the Gelora Bung Karno Sports Complex, Central Jakarta. JICC's exhibition halls A and B has had hosted the event from the first until the supplementary event subtitled "Pop Asia" in June 2023. ICC had moved to the larger Assembly, Cendrawasih and Plenary halls since the eighth edition in November 2023. In 2026, the event moved to the Jakarta International Expo in Kemayoran, Central Jakarta.

As a multigenre convention, Indonesia Comic Con have hosted cosplay events, comic book and other intellectual property-based merchandise market, booths of major film studios like Disney and 20th Century Studios, open interview with notable film and TV actors/actresses, and also musical concerts. A virtual 3D VTuber concert was first held at the eighth edition, as well as Esport-related events.

In 2024, Panorama Media, the organizer of ICC, announced that there would be a spin-off as an anime convention named Indonesia Anime Con (INACON or IAC). The latter debuted on 15 June 2024. Panorama said that they created a separated events for both western and eastern pop cultures after receiving input from the visitors. Thus, ICC would be more focused on western pop culture. However, ICC remained to host several events related to eastern pop cultures (such as the VTuber concert and the opening of a Crunchyroll booth), but they would focus on promoting Indonesia's own intellectual properties like Si Juki for instance.

== List of editions ==
Edition	Brand name	Date	Venue	Main guest stars	Notes
1	Indonesia Comic Con	15–16 November 2015	Jakarta International Convention Center	(United States) David W. Mack (Japan) Kenji Ohba (Italy) Simone Legno (Indonesia) Saykoji	
2	Indonesia Comic Con	1–2 October 2016	Jakarta International Convention Center	(United States) Brianna Hildebrand (United Kingdom) Andy Price (Canada) Alex Milne	
3	Indonesia Comic Con	28–29 October 2017	Jakarta International Convention Center	(United States) Jason David Frank (New Zealand) Daniel Logan	
4	Indonesia Comic Con	27–28 October 2018	Jakarta International Convention Center	(Indonesia) Joko Anwar	
5	Shopee Indonesia Comic Con	12–13 October 2019	Jakarta International Convention Center	(United States) Austin St. John (United States) Deborah Ann Woll	
–	2020 and 2021 editions were cancelled due to the COVID-19 pandemic				
6	Indonesia Comic Con presented by TikTok Shop	1–2 October 2022	Jakarta International Convention Center	(United States) Brandon Routh	
–	Indonesia Comic Con: Pop Asia	23–25 June 2023	Jakarta International Convention Center	(Indonesia) Weird Genius	Marketed as Indonesia Comic Con: Pop Asia, which become the forerunner of ICC's spin-off event, Indonesia Anime Con. The first and only edition to be held in three days.
7	Indonesia Comic Con X DG Con	4–5 November 2023	Jakarta International Convention Center	(United Kingdom) Ed Westwick (Japan) Motoaki Tanigo	The event moved to the Assembly, Cendrawasih and Plenary halls of JICC, having previously held on its two exhibition halls since 2015.
8	wondrful Indonesia Comic Con	9–10 November 2024	Jakarta International Convention Center	(Canada) Cobie Smulders	
9	myBCA Indonesia Comic Con X Indonesia Anime Con	25–26 October 2025	Jakarta International Convention Center	No officially-designated guests	To commemorate the 10th anniversary of the event, the second edition of Indonesia Anime Con was held together with the ICC at the same date and venue. The last edition to be held at the Jakarta International Convention Center.
10	Indonesia Comic Con	3–4 October 2026	Jakarta International Expo	(Japan) Mackenyu	This is the first edition to be held in a new venue, the Jakarta International Expo in Kemayoran

=== 2015 ===
The first edition of the convention was held from 14 to 15 November 2015 at the exhibition halls of the Jakarta International Convention Center. American comic artist David Mack, Japanese actor Kenji Ohba, Italian artist Simone Legno, and Indonesian rapper Saykoji were special guests at the event. 160 exhibitors from six countries had opened counters to entertain fans and sell merchandise.

=== 2016 ===
The second edition of the comic con was held from 1–2 October 2016. Actress Brianna Hildebrand, comic artists Alex Milne and Andy Price along with several other illustrators were present at the event. Exhibitors from countries like Canada, Italy, Japan, Malaysia, Singapore, Thailand, the US and Indonesia participated in the event. Cosplay events were held by Lego and Flabslab, while toy outlets like XM Studios exhibited fan merchandise. Several new fan zones were opened for the second edition.

=== 2017 ===
Actors Jason David Frank and Daniel Logan were guests for the third edition of the comic con, which was held from 28 to 29 October 2017. Star Wars lightsaber performances, The Walking Dead Escape Room and the Star Trek booth were some entertainment zones opened for fans.

=== 2018 ===
This fourth edition was held on 27–28 October 2018, featuring the actors and actresses of Game of Thrones and Supergirl. The teaser trailer of Indonesia's superhero movie Gundala was unveiled by its director Joko Anwar.

=== 2019 ===
The fifth edition of ICC was held on 12–13 October 2019. The actor of the Red Power Ranger Austin St. John, Deborah Ann Woll from Marvel's Daredevil, and cosplayer Larissa Rochefort became the guest stars. One of the notable booths were 20th Century Fox Indonesia booth, which plays the sneak peek of Terminator: Dark Fate for the first time in Indonesia, as well as Sony Pictures' Jumanji: The Next Level. Indonesian comic publisher Bumilangit released its Bangkitnya Ki Wilawuk (The Rise of Ki Wilawuk) comic to ICC visitors, as the continuity of Bumilangit's Gundala film.

=== 2020 and 2021 (cancelled) ===
Due to the outbreak of COVID-19, on 16 July 2020, the ICC event organizer (EO) announced that the event would be delayed to 30–31 January 2021, via their YouTube channel. However, both 2020 and 2021 editions were eventually cancelled.

=== 2022 ===
After its two-year absent, the sixth event of ICC was held on 1–2 October 2022, the first time since the pandemic. An NFT-based ticketing system was first introduced. Brandon Routh, together with the numbers of VTubers and international cosplayers, such as Knite and Jasper became one of the guest stars.

=== 2023 ===
On 1 May 2023, it was announced that ICC would be held twice, with a supplementary event branded as Indonesia Comic Con: Pop Asia held in June, and the seventh edition in November.

In ICC Pop Asia, numbers of cosplayers, comic artists, VTubers, and DJs from both Japan and Indonesia attended as guests of the event, including Weird Genius as the main guest. It was held from 23 to 25 June 2023, the last edition to be held on Halls A and B of JICC. ICC Pop Asia later become the forerunner of ICC's spin-off event, Indonesia Anime Con (INACON).

The seventh edition of ICC (in collaboration with Telkomsel's Dunia Games platform, branded as DG Con) was held from 4–5 November 2023, featuring English actor Ed Westwick, DJ Haruka, and Cover Corp. CEO Motoaki Tanigo, as one of the guest stars. The event conjoined with Dunia Games' DG Awards 2023, an awarding event for e-sport figures. The first 3D VTuber concert in Indonesia enlivens the event. It was the first time ICC moved to Assembly, Cendrawasih, and Plenary halls of JICC, which have larger capacity.

=== 2024 ===
The eighth edition was branded wondrful Indonesia Comic Con after its title sponsor, Bank Negara Indonesia's wondr by BNI mobile banking app, which took place on 9–10 November 2024. Canadian actress Cobie Smulders became the main guest star of this edition. Crunchyroll opened their booth at the convention. Motorcycle manufacturer Astra Honda Motor introduced a special model of Honda BeAT motorcycle with Kobo Kanaeru livery.

=== 2025 ===
The ninth edition commemorates the tenth anniversary of ICC. Its spin-off event, INACON, was simultaneously held at same date and venue, 25–26 October 2025. English actor Ben Hardy was originally scheduled to attend as the main guest star, but ultimately canceled it. As the result, there is no official main guest for the first time since ICC's inauguration, and none of the other supporting guests was officially designated the title. This marked the last time ICC was held at the Jakarta International Convention Center before moving to a new venue in the next edition.

=== 2026 ===
The tenth edition of ICC took place on 3–4 October 2026 in a new venue, the Jakarta International Expo in Kemayoran, Central Jakarta. Japanese-American actor Mackenyu, known for his role as Roronoa Zoro in the One Piece live-action series, became the official main guest.

== Indonesia Anime Con ==
Official logo of Indonesia Anime Con

Indonesia Anime Con (INACON or IAC) is the spin-off event of ICC, which is a separated Japanese anime and manga convention, established on 15 June 2024. It was first announced on 1 January 2024, with the unveiling of the event's then-unnamed two mascots; later revealed as Kaitu Arjuna and Kirana Yumi. It is set to be the second major anime convention in Indonesia after Comifuro.

The debut took place on 15–16 June 2024 in Indonesia Convention Exhibition, BSD City. It featured comic artists, as well as special guests, from Japan and Indonesia. The guests includes Motomu Toriyama and Teruki Endo, each are the co-director and gameplay battle director of Final Fantasy VII Rebirth. Weird Genius and JKT48 filled the musical performance.

The second edition of INACON was originally intended to be held from 17 to 18 May 2025 at the Senayan Park mall, but was pushed back to October, being held simultaneously with ICC in the same place and date, the JICC. Consequently, the national finals of the Indonesia Cosplay Grand Prix was relocated to ChibiCon! Surabaya doujinshi convention in Tunjungan Plaza.

== See also ==
- Comifuro – A similar comic convention in Indonesia.
- List of comic book conventions
