= Sri Asih (1954 film) =

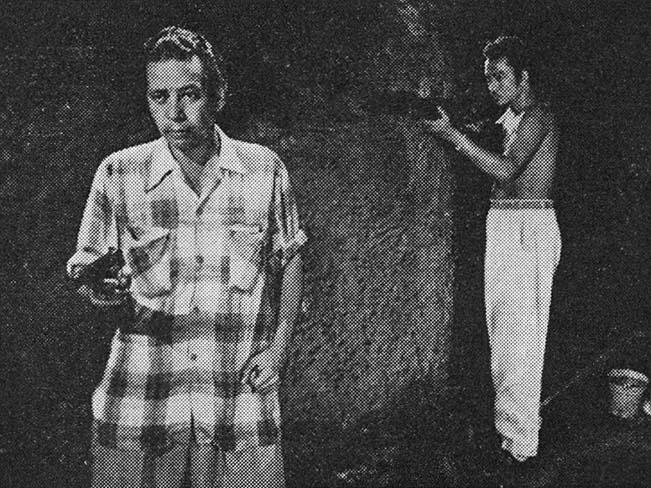
- Ali Joego in a scene from the film
- Directed by: Tan Sing Hwat; Turino Djunaedy
- Produced by: Turino Djunaedy
- Starring: Mimi Mariani; Turino Djunaedy; Ali Joego; Nazar Dollar
- Cinematography: Chu Su To
- Production company: Gabungan Artis Film
- Release date: 27 June 1954 (Indonesia)
- Country: Indonesia
- Language: Indonesian

Sri Asih is a 1954 Indonesian lost superhero film directed by Tan Sing Hwat and Turino Djunaedy, and starring Mimi Mariani, Djunaedy, Ali Joego, and Nazar Dollar. This film was the first Indonesian superhero film adapted from comics by R. A. Kosasih.

== Plot ==
When her father falls ill in Semarang, Nani Wijaya accompanies her mother to the train station, for the latter to make the visit.

After the train departs, she overhears that the train is about to meet an accident, as a gang of criminals has placed dynamite on one of the bridge that the train will pass through.

Nani takes out her charm and transforms into a super woman, Sri Asih, who can fly and finds the dynamite and throws it into the river where it explodes. Later, she pursues the Garuda Hitam gang and captures them.

== Cast ==
- Mimi Mariani as Nani Wijaya/Sri Asih
- Turino Djunaedy
- Ali Joego as Head of Villains
- Chaidar Djafar
- Sukarno M. Noor
- Nazar Dollar
- Chaidir Sakti
- Bas M. Amin

== Production ==
The black-and-white film was shot, and directed by Tan Sing Hwat and Turino Djunaedy, who also starred as the male protagonist. It was adapted from comics with the same name by R. A. Kosasih Sri Asih, and was produced by Gerakan Artis Film Sang Saka which previously produced Pulang (1952), and Rentjong dan Surat (1953). This film starred Mimi Mariani and Ali Joego in a leading role.

== Release and reception ==
Sri Asih was released in 1954. It was screened at Capitol Theatre in Singapore, two years after it was released. A review from Aneka magazine wrote that Sri Asih is a bandit action film, with a lot of shooting and car chases.

== Remake ==
A remake of Sri Asih was produced in 2022, directed by Upi Avianto, and starred Pevita Pearce, Reza Rahadian, and Christine Hakim. Pearce portrayed Alana, a third version of Sri Asih. While Hakim portrayed Mariani, Alana's grandmother, whom character name was taken from Mimi Mariani's stage name. Najwa Shihab made a cameo appearance as Nani Wijaya, a real name of the first Sri Asih that was portrayed by Mariani in 1954.

== Legacy ==
Sri Asih was considered lost, it remained as the first Indonesian superhero film.
