= Satria Dewa Universe =

Indonesian superhero films

The Satria Dewa Universe (SDU) (Indonesian: Satria Dewa Semesta; lit. 'Kshatriya Deva Universe') is a live action media franchise of Indonesian superheroes adapted from Indonesian wayang stories from the Bhāratayuddha, a version of the ancient Indian epic Mahabharata, as modern interpretations of those characters. There are eight films planned in this series which depict the descendants of the Pandavas (and the Kaurava antagonists), including Gatotkaca (2022), Arjuna (2023), Srikandi (2024), Kurusetra (2025), Yudhistira (2026), Bima (2027), Bharatayudha (2028) and Bharatayudha II (2029). Two films initially included in the series Nakula and Sadewa and Heroine were subsequently cancelled. On August 26, 2019, Erick Thohir and Wishnutama were announced as shareholders of Satria Dewa. The series has also been adapted for comics and merchandise.

== See also ==
- Superhero film
- Bumilangit Cinematic Universe, another Indonesian superhero film universe
