= Abimana Aryasatya =

Indonesian actor (born 1982)

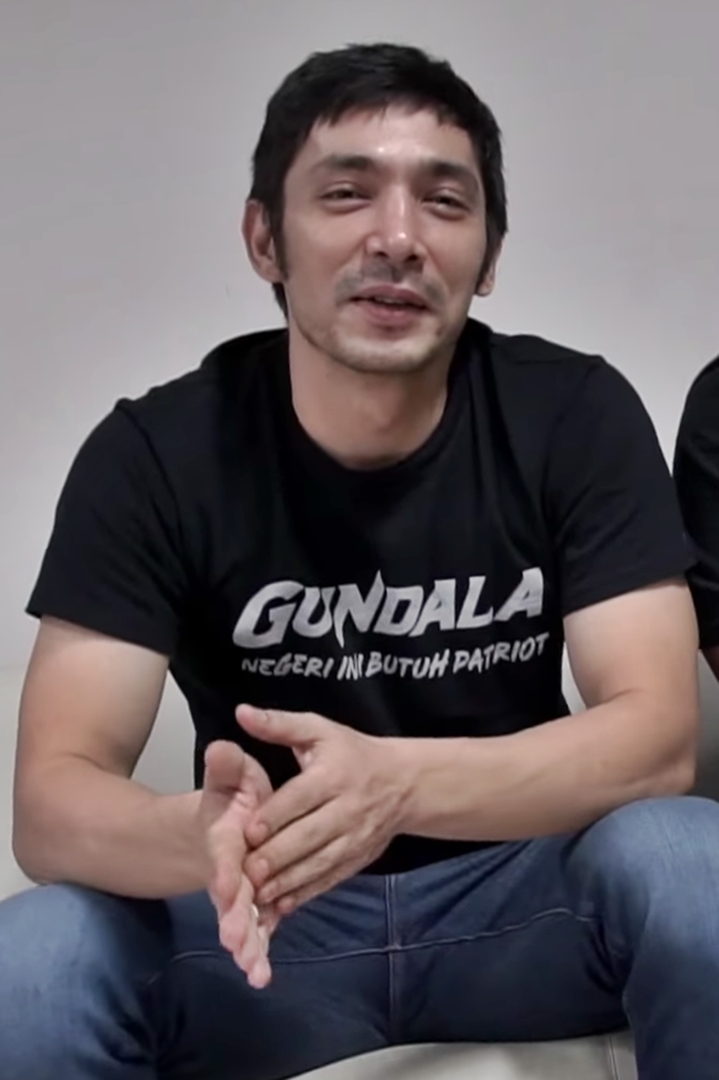
- Abimana on interview with Media Indonesia, 2019
- Born: Robertino; 24 October 1982 (age 44); Jakarta, Indonesia
- Occupations: Actor; film producer
- Years active: 1995–presents
- Spouse: Inong Nindya Ayu (m. 2001)
- Children: Belva Ugraha; Satine Zaneta Putri Hujan; Bima Bijak; Arsanadi Sarka
- Parent(s): Roberto Candelas Aguinaga; Ie Siu Khiauw

Abimana Aryasatya (born Robertino; 24 October 1982) is an Indonesian actor. He is best known for starring in the films Shackled (2012), 99 Cahaya di Langit Eropa (2013), Haji Backpacker (2014), and in the 5th highest-grossing Indonesian film of all time, Warkop DKI Reborn: Jangkrik Boss! Part 1 (2016). He has received multiple awards and nominations such as Indonesian Movie Awards, Indonesian Film Festival, and Indonesian Box Office Movie Awards.

== Career ==
=== 1995–2010: early career ===
Abimana began his entertainment career in 1997 as stand-in and film crew in television series and movies. in 1999 he started his first role debut as supporting actor in Indonesian popular TV series Lupus Millenia under the name Robertino.

He made his big screen debut in 2005 with Missing and 12.00 AM. Just as his acting career was starting to kick off, Abimana vanished from the industry in 2006. In an interview with The Jakarta Post in October 2014 Abimana stated that at the time, he felt he had had enough of acting and just wanted to get away from the entertainment world, saying, "Acting has never been the only choice for me. At that time, I felt that there was too much drama and backstage politicking in the entertainment world". During the hiatus, he took his wife, Inong Ayu, to Semarang in Central Java, where he started a culinary business.

However, he still appeared in low budget movies such as Miracle: Menantang Maut (2007), Malam Jumat Kliwon (2007) and Rudi Soedjarwo 2008 Film, Sebelah mata.

=== 2010–2013: career comeback and breakthrough ===
After a hiatus of five years, In 2010, he made comeback to small screen with soap opera Sinar. In 2011 he decided to change his name to Abimana Aryasatya, also in the same year his breakthrough role arrived when he starred opposite actor Ario Bayu, Carissa Putri, and Didi Petet in the film Catatan (Harian) Si Boy a reboot of the 1987 film Catatan Si Boy. He received his first Indonesian Movie award Nomination for Best Supporting Actor and Favorite Supporting Actor at the 6th Annual Indonesian Movie Awards. The film established him as a promising film star and leading man and led him continued his career with leading roles in films such as Dilema (2012), Keumala (2012), Sang Pialang (2013), Coboy Junior: The Movie (2013) and isyarat (2013)

In 2012, Abimana starred in the horror-thriller movie Shackled with Imelda Therinne and Laudya Cynthia Bella. In the movie, he plays Elang, a youth who experiences mental illness. He was nominated in numerous awards for his performance, such as, Best Male Leading Actor at the 2013 Indonesian Film Festival, Favorite Actor and Best Actor at the 2013 Indonesian Movie Awards, and Best Actor in a Leading Role at the 2013 Maya Awards. The same year, he also starred in the film Republik Twitter as Lead actor with Laura Basuki and Tio Pakusadewo. He formed the band Drona with Ario Bayu and one of their singles, "Gadis Dalam Mimpi", was used in the soundtrack of the movie Republik Twitter.

In 2013, he was cast to replacing Noah's vocalist, Nazril Irham, as Arai in the third Installment of Laskar Pelangi franchises Edensor.

=== 2013–present: rising popularity and widespread recognition ===
His popularity skyrocketed and gain widespread recognition when he starred alongside Acha Septriasa in the 2013 Indonesia blockbuster film 99 Cahaya di Langit Eropa adaptation from novel with the same name. This movie, a Maxima Pictures film, was the studio's most expensive movie when released, with a budget exceeding 15 billion rupiah. It received praise from the President of Indonesia, Susilo Bambang Yudhoyono, during its premiere at Djakarta Theater on 29 November 2013.

In 2014, Abimana starred as Mada in Haji Backpacker. His character travels overland to Mecca through Indonesia, Thailand, Vietnam, China, India, Tibet, Nepal, Iran, and Saudi Arabia. His performance received praise both from critics and public and he was nominated for Best Male Leading Actor at the Indonesian Film Festival for the second time, and also for Favorite Actor and Best Actor at the 2013 Indonesian Movie Awards.

In 2016, he portrayed indonesian famous comedian Dono in remake comedy film, Warkop DKI Reborn: Jangkrik Boss! Part 1. The film went on to become the highest-grossing Indonesian film of all time, grossing more than 6.8 Billion in admission. Abimana performance was praised and the following year he won Indonesian Box Office Movie Awards for Best Actor in Leading role and nominated for numerous awards such as Indonesian Film Festival for Best Leading Actor, Maya Awards for Best Actor in Leading Role and Indonesian Choice Awards for Actor of the Year.

2018 become his debut year as a producer, he collaborated with Fourcolour Films to produce family films The Adventure of a Thunder Catcher and also co-produce Timo Tjahjanto horror movies May the Devil Take You. at the same year he also played alongside Iko Uwais, Joe Taslim and Julie Estelle in Netflix original films The Night Comes for Us. In October 2018 at Indonesia Comic-Con, it was announced that Abimana will star in Joko Anwar's Highly anticipated superhero film Gundala.

In 2022, Abimana starred in The big 4, a Netflix Action Comedy directed by Timo Tjahjanto. Upon release, The Big 4 is the second most watched non-English-language film of the week, The Big 4 also entered Netflix's top 10 country film lists in 53 countries, including Indonesia where it is the top-ranked film title. It appeared in the top ten in countries including Argentina, Mexico, Finland, Spain and Greece. Within Asia it ranked in the top ten in The Philippines, South Korea, Taiwan, Thailand, U.S. and Vietnam.

== Personal life ==
Abimana was born on 24 October 1982, in Jakarta, Indonesia. He is the only child of a Spanish father, Roberto Candelas Aguinaga, and Chinese Indonesian mother, Ie Siu Khiauw. Previously known as Robertino, In 2011 he changed his name to Abimana Aryasatya because Robertino is his father's name. "I never see my father, and I am uncomfortable using that name," he explains. "By changing my name, I want to become a new person and apart from the shadow of my father and my past". He has been practicing Islam since he was around the age of 13.

In 2001, he married Indonesian actress and model Inong Nindya Ayu. The couple have four children. After years of searching his biological father, he eventually met him for the first time after 33 years, where his father currently reside in Durango.

== Filmography ==
=== Film ===
Year	Title	Credited as		Role	Notes	Ref.
Year	Title	Actor	Producer	Role	Notes	Ref.
2005	Missing	Yes	No	Rizal		
2005	12.00 AM	Yes	No	Alvin		
2007	Miracle "Menantang Maut"	Yes	No	Mr. Irawan		
2007	Malam Jumat Kliwon	Yes	No	Ramon		
2008	Sebelah Mata	Yes	No	Anton Gabrielle		
2009	Serigala Terakhir	Yes	No	Black Dragon Member	Uncredited	
2010	Demi Dewi	Yes	No	Rama		
2011	Catatan (Harian) Si Boy	Yes	No	Andi		
2012	Republik Twitter	Yes	No	Sukmo Wiyogo		
2012	Dilema	Yes	No	Barry	Segment: "Big Boss"	
2012	Keumala	Yes	No	Langit		
2012	Belenggu	Yes	No	Elang		
2013	Sang Pialang	Yes	No	Mahesa		
2013	Coboy Junior: The Movie	Yes	No	Patrick		
2013	Edensor	Yes	No	Arai		
2013	99 Cahaya di Langit Eropa	Yes	No	Rangga Almahendra		
2013	Isyarat	Yes	No	Danel		
2014	Haji Backpacker	Yes	No	Mada		
2014	99 Cahaya di Langit Eropa Part 2	Yes	No	Rangga Almahendra		
2015	CJR: The Movie	Yes	No	Patrick		
2015	3 (Alif Lam Mim)	Yes	No	Herlam		
2015	Negeri Van Oranje (Van Oranje Country)	Yes	No	Wicak		
2015	Bulan Terbelah di Langit Amerika	Yes	No	Rangga Almahendra		
2016	Sabtu Bersama Bapak	Yes	No	Gunawan Garnida		
2016	Warkop DKI Reborn: Jangkrik Boss! Part 1	Yes	No	Dono		
2016	Bulan Terbelah di Langit Amerika 2	Yes	No	Rangga Almahendra		
2017	Warkop DKI Reborn: Jangkrik Boss Part 2	Yes	No	Dono		
2018	The Night Comes for Us	Yes	No	Fatih		
2018	Petualangan Menangkap petir	Yes	Yes	Arifin		
2018	212 Warrior	Yes	No	Pangeran Matahari	Uncredited Cameo	
2018	May the Devil Take You	Yes	Yes	The Devil	Voice Cameo	
2019	Gundala	Yes	No	Sancaka / Gundala		
2021	Story of Dinda: Second Chance of Happiness	Yes	No	Pram		
2022	Sri Asih	Yes	No	Sancaka / Gundala	Cameo	
2022	The Big 4	Yes	No	Topan		
2023	Virgo and the Sparklings	Yes	No	Sancaka / Gundala	Cameo	

=== Television series ===
Year	Title	Role	Network	Ref.
1999	Lupus Millenia	Nuno	Indosiar	
2010	Sinar	Ferry	SCTV	
2020 - Present	Serigala Terakhir The Series	Alex	Vidio	
2023	Marriage with Benefits	Aksan	Viu	

=== Web series ===
Year	Title	Role	Ref
2018	Axelerate the series: Kostan AX/3	Mas Jay	
2022	SASA The Flavour of Nature	Himself	

=== Music video appearances ===
Year	Title	Artist	Ref.
1999	"Sudahlah"	Padi	
2000	"Hati yang Terpilih"	Rossa	
2001	"Lara Hati"	Katon Bagaskara	
2003	"Antara Ada Dan Tiada"	Utopia	
2014	"LDR"	Raisa	
2021	"Laila"	Monita Tahalea	

== Awards and nominations ==
Year	Association	Category	Nominated work	Result	Ref.
2012	Indonesian Movie Awards	Best Supporting Actor	Catatan (Harian) Si Boy	Nominated	
2012	Indonesian Movie Awards	Favorite Supporting Actor	Catatan (Harian) Si Boy	Nominated	
2013	Indonesian Movie Awards	Best Actor	Belenggu	Nominated	
2013	Indonesian Movie Awards	Favorite Actor	Belenggu	Nominated	
2013	Maya Awards	Best Actor in Leading Role	Belenggu	Nominated	
2013	Indonesian Film Festival	Citra Award for Best Leading Actor	Belenggu	Nominated	
2014	Indonesian Film Festival	Citra Award for Best Leading Actor	Haji Backpacker	Nominated	
2015	Indonesian Movie Awards	Best Actor	Haji Backpacker	Nominated	
2015	Indonesian Movie Awards	Favorite Actor	Haji Backpacker	Nominated	
2016	Indonesian Film Festival	Citra Award for Best Leading Actor	Warkop DKI Reborn: Jangkrik Boss! Part 1	Nominated	
2016	Maya Awards	Best Actor in Leading Role	Warkop DKI Reborn: Jangkrik Boss! Part 1	Nominated	
2017	Indonesian Movie Actor Awards	Best Actor	Warkop DKI Reborn: Jangkrik Boss! Part 1	Nominated	
2017	Indonesian Movie Actor Awards	Favorite Actor	Warkop DKI Reborn: Jangkrik Boss! Part 1	Nominated	
2017	Indonesian Box Office Movie Awards	Best Actor in Leading Role	Warkop DKI Reborn: Jangkrik Boss! Part 1	Won	
2017	Indonesian Box Office Movie Awards	Best Ensemble Cast	Warkop DKI Reborn: Jangkrik Boss! Part 1	Won	
2017	Indonesian Choice Awards	Actor of the Year	—N/a	Nominated	
2018	Indonesian Box Office Movie Awards	Best Actor in Leading Role	Warkop DKI Reborn: Jangkrik Boss! Part 2	Won	
2019	Indonesian Film Festival	Citra Award for Best Leading Actor	Gundala	Nominated	
2023	Maya Awards	Best Actor in a Leading Role	The Big 4	Nominated	
2026	Indonesian Film Festival	Citra Award for Best Leading Actor	Ghost In A Cell	Won	
