= Bumilangit =

Indonesian Comics company

PT Bumilangit Entertainment Corpora
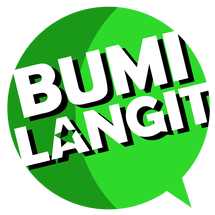
- Industry: Entertainment
- Genre: Superhero fiction
- Founded: December 8, 2003; 22 years ago
- Founder: Bismarka Kurniawan
- Headquarters: Jakarta, Indonesia
- Area served: Worldwide
- Key people: Bismarka Kurniawan (CEO)
- Products: Motion pictures; Television shows; Comic publications; Animation; Digital business
- Services: Licensing; Merchandising
- Subsidiaries: Bumilangit Comic; Screenplay Bumilangit; Bumilangit Digital
- Website: bumilangit.com

PT Bumilangit Entertainment Corpora (Bumilangit) is an Indonesian intellectual property-based entertainment company which has one of the largest comic book character libraries in Asia. Bumilangit maintains a library of more than 1,200 comic characters that have been published over the last sixty years. Currently, Bumilangit is also involved in the production of films, television series, animation, comic publications (print or digital), licensing, merchandising, and digital business based on those characters.

== History ==
Established in 2003, Bumilangit marked the milestone in the revival of superheroes-based comic storytelling in Indonesia. Since 2003, various legendary Indonesian comic characters is under the management of Bumilangit such as Gundala (by Hasmi), Si Buta Dari Gua Hantu (by Ganes TH), Sri Asih (by RA Kosasih), Tira, Virgo (Jan Mintaraga), Mandala (Man), and so on.

=== Film and television series production ===
In 2018, Bumilangit and Screenplay Films formed a partnership by establishing PT Screenplay Bumilangit Production (Screenplay Bumilangit) which is engaged in the production of films and television series that focus on creating the Bumilangit Cinematic Universe.

In August 2019, Screenplay Bumilangit producers, Bismarka Kurniawan, Wicky V. Olindo and Joko Anwar, publicly launched Bumilangit Cinematic Universe volume 1 and also announced A-list Indonesian actors and actresses to play characters in its films, such as Abimana Aryasatya, Pevita Pearce, Chelsea Islan, Tara Basro, Dian Sastrowardoyo, Joe Taslim, Nicholas Saputra, and others.

In the same month, Screenplay Bumilangit released Gundala, directed by Joko Anwar, as the first film for the Bumilangit Cinematic Universe in cinemas. Gundala later became the most successful Indonesian comic superhero-themed film and was officially selected for the Midnight Madness screening program at the 2019 Toronto International Film Festival.

In 2020, Screenplay Bumilangit announced an exclusive partnership with Disney+ Hotstar to stream Bumilangit Cinematic Universe movies after they were released in theaters. At the same time, Screenplay Bumilangit also announced the new Bumilangit Cinematic Universe actors and actresses, such as Reza Rahadian, Christine Hakim, Jefri Nichol, and Dimas Anggara.

In 2021, Disney+ Hotstar announced that it would stream TIRA series as part of the Bumilangit Cinematic Universe Volume 1 In 2022, the next entry from Bumilangit Cinematic Universe, Sri Asih, which is directed by Upi and starring Pevita Pearce, has been announced for release on November 17, 2022.

=== Animation production ===
Bumilangit released the Patriot Cilik animated series on national television on June 1, 2018. During its broadcast, Patriot Cilik was watched by an average of 30 million people per day. Various merchandise, children's story books, and mobile games based on Patriot Cilik series have also been made.

On January 16, 2020, Bumilangit re-released Si Bulan Koki Super animated series which contains religious messages. The children's animation, which was broadcast on the national television, immediately became the number one animated religious children series in Indonesia with an audience of about 10 million people per day in its first month. Season 2 of Si Bulan Koki Super series is currently in production and will be released in 2022.

The children's animated series Gundala and Friends is also in production and will air on national television stations in 2023

=== Comic publishing ===
Bumilangit has published various printed comics since its establishment until now. Currently, Bumilangit printed comics are sold through Gramedia bookstores and e-commerce platforms.

In 2017, Bumilangit Komik published Virgo and The Sparklings comic on the LINE Webtoon platform and is one of the best-selling comic titles on LINE Webtoon Indonesia with 1.8 million subscribers and 195 million views. Virgo and the Sparklings comic is also translated by fans into 30 languages such as English, Mandarin, Spanish, French, Turkish, Arabic and many more.

In 2019, Gundala: Takdir, which is a print comic adaptation of the film Gundala, is one of the best-selling comics in Indonesia, reaching four reprints and distributed in English in Southeast Asian countries such as Malaysia and Singapore.

Bumilangit Komik has released other digital comics on LINE Webtoon, Gundala: Son of Lightning (2019) and Sri Asih: Celestial Goddess (2020).

=== Digital ===
In 2021, Bumilangit and PT Digital Mediatama Maxima Tbk. (DMMX) collaborated to establish PT Bumilangit Digital Mediatama Maxima (Bumilangit Digital or BLDX) which focusing on digital types of business, one of which is internationally launching Virgo and the Sparklings: Rhythm of My Life mobile game on April 14, 2022.

At the end of 2021, Bumilangit Digital launched an NFT collection based on Bumilangit characters.

=== Licensing and merchandise ===
Bumilangit licenses its IPs to third parties to make various products based on these IPs and its target market segment.

Adjacent to the 2018 Asian Games, on August 31, PT Bank Rakyat Indonesia Tbk (BRI) together with Bumilangit launched a limited edition BRIZZI card that was only issued during the 18th Asian Games, the BRIZZI BUMILANGIT SUPERHEROES card.

On April 4, 2019, PT Pos Indonesia (Persero) launched the Indonesian Hero Series stamps which have designs including Gundala Putra Petir, Si Buta dari Gua Hantu and Sri Asih.

In July 2021, PT Melon Indonesia as the publisher of the Lokapala game officially collaborated with Bumilangit Entertainment by creating Ksatriya character from Bumilangit comic series, Si Buta dari Gua Hantu and Virgo and the Sparklings in the Lokapala game.

In October 2021, Huion collaborated with Bumilangit to work on a special project, the Patriot comic "Aftermath". Comic about a group of superheroes (Godam, Gundala, Aquanus, Maza, Sri Asih, Tira, Virgo, Mlaar, Nusantara, Sembrani and Merpati). All of the drawing processes use Huion devices. In addition, the Huion x Bumilangit collaboration also launched a Patriot special edition of Huion RTS-300.

Collaborating with Sandal Swallow, Bumilangit launched #SwallowBumilangit with exclusive Gundala designs on National Heroes' Day on November 10, 2021.

On December 3, 2021, Bumilangit and PUBG Mobile announced their partnership by launching PUBG Mobile x Gundala. Carrying the theme of Pahlawan Tanah Air, Gundala was chosen as the first superhero character in Southeast Asia that can be played in PUBG Mobile. The TikTok promotion for this partnership has been viewed 6.5 billion times.

On April 6, 2022, PT Telekomunikasi Selular (Telkomsel) and PT Bank Mandiri (Persero) Tbk (Mandiri) together with PT M Cash Integration Tbk (MCAS Group), in collaboration with Bumilangit, launched a physical edition of Telkomsel internet vouchers and Mandiri e-Money Cards with Bumilangit characters. At IIMS 2022 event on March 31, 2022, Volta collaborated with Bumilangit by launching the Virgo and the Sparklings electric motorcycle which was inspired by one of the Bumilangit comic characters.

== Units ==
- Bumilangit Comic
- Screenplay Bumilangit
- Bumilangit Digital

== Production ==
=== Web series ===
No.	Title	Year	Director	Notes
1.	Tira	2023	Zahir Omar	Disney+ Hotstar original

=== Films ===
Bumilangit Cinematic Universe

No.	Title	Year	Director	Notes
1.	Gundala	2019	Joko Anwar	Won 3 Citra Awards at Festival Film Indonesia 2019
2.	Sri Asih	2022	Upi	
3.	Virgo and the Sparklings	2023	Ody C. Harahap	
4.	Godam & Tira	2024	Zahir Omar	
5.	The Blind of the Phantom Cave	TBA	Timo Tjahjanto	
6.	Mandala: The Devil's Sword	TBA	TBA	
7.	Gundala the Son of Lightning	TBA	Joko Anwar	
8.	Patriot	TBA	TBA	

=== Animation ===
- Patriot Cilik (2018) ANTV
- Si Bulan Koki Super (2021) ANTV
