= Shackled (2012 Indonesian film) =

2012 Indonesian horror film

- Film poster
- Belenggu
- Directed by: Upi Avianto
- Written by: Upi Avianto
- Produced by: Frederica; Upi Avianto
- Starring: Abimana Aryasatya; Imelda Therinne; Laudya Chintya Bella; Verdi Solaiman; Avrilla; Jajang C. Noer; Bella Esperance; Arswendi Nasution; Teuku Rifnu Wikana
- Cinematography: Ical Tanjung
- Edited by: Wawan I. Wibowo
- Music by: Aksan Sjuman
- Production company: Falcon Pictures
- Release dates: July 20, 2012 (South Korea); February 28, 2013 (Indonesia)
- Running time: 99 minutes
- Country: Indonesia
- Language: Indonesian

Shackled (Indonesian: Belenggu) is a 2012 Indonesian psychological horror film directed by Upi Avianto. It had its premiere at the Bucheon International Fantastic Film Festival where it was shown in competition on July 20, 2012.

== Synopsis ==
The film is set in Jakarta and involves Elang (Abimana Aryasatya) who has nightmares about an unknown woman in a car with a man in a rabbit suit and dead bodies in the back. Elang later sees this woman in a bar and explains that she's been evicted from her apartment. Elang's nightmares grow worse after he is told by the woman that men had raped and tortured her. Elang agrees to accompany her to face them.

== Cast ==
- Abimana Aryasatya as Elang
- Imelda Therinne as Jingga
- Laudya Cynthia Bella as Djenar
- Verdi Solaiman as Guntur, Djenar's husband
- Avrilla as Senja, the daughter of Djenar and Guntur
- Jajang C. Noer as Mrs. Kebaya, who had a daughter who died from an accident
- Bella Esperance as The crazy grandmother
- Arswendi Nasution as Josef
- Teuku Rifnu Wikana as The colleague

== Reception ==
Belenggu received a mixed review from Film Business Asia, who stated that "on a psycho-horror level there's nothing new or inventive here. Belenggu isn't bad, it's merely routine". Twitch gave the film a mixed review, opining that "With a tighter, more adventurous script, there is no doubt that Upi Avianto has the talents behind the camera to deliver an effective thriller of great beauty and dramatic substance. While Belenggu is not that film, it nevertheless makes a confident positive stride towards accomplishing that in the future." Variety gave the film a generally positive review, noting that "Though Elang's backstory is a little too sketchy for a little too long, Avianto's imaginative storytelling and the pic's unsettling visual and aural atmosphere should keep most auds absorbed until the triple-reverse finale."

== Awards and nominations ==
Year	Award	Category	Recipients	Results
2013	Indonesian Film Festival	Best Film	Belenggu	Nominated
2013	Indonesian Film Festival	Best Director	Upi Avianto	Nominated
2013	Indonesian Film Festival	Best Male Leading Role	Abimana Aryasatya	Nominated
2013	Indonesian Film Festival	Best Female Leading Role	Laudya Cynthia Bella	Nominated
2013	Indonesian Film Festival	Best Artistic Director	Iqbal Rayya Rante	Won
2013	Indonesian Film Festival	Best Arranger	Aksan Sjuman	Won
2013	Indonesian Movie Awards	Favorite Film	Belenggu	Nominated
2013	Indonesian Movie Awards	Favorite Actor	Abimana Aryasatya	Nominated
2013	Indonesian Movie Awards	Favorite Actress	Imelda Therinne	Nominated
2013	Indonesian Movie Awards	Favorite Actress	Laudya Cynthia Bella	Won
2013	Indonesian Movie Awards	Best Actor	Abimana Aryasatya	Nominated
2013	Indonesian Movie Awards	Best Actress	Imelda Therinne	Won
2013	Indonesian Movie Awards	Best Actress	Laudya Cynthia Bella	Nominated
2013	Indonesian Movie Awards	Best Supporting Actor	Verdi Solaiman	Nominated
2013	Indonesian Movie Awards	Special Award: Best Kids Role	Avrilla	Nominated
2013	Maya Awards	Best Feature Film	Belenggu	Nominated
2013	Maya Awards	Best Director	Upi Avianto	Nominated
2013	Maya Awards	Best Actor in Leading Role	Abimana Aryasatya	Nominated
2013	Maya Awards	Best Actress in Supporting Role	Imelda Therinne	Nominated
2013	Maya Awards	Best Original Screenplay	Upi Avianto	Nominated
2013	Maya Awards	Best Costume Design	Andhika Dharmapermana	Nominated
2013	Maya Awards	Best Makeup & Hair Styling	Kumalasari	Nominated
2013	Maya Awards	Best Sound Design	Belenggu	Nominated
2013	Maya Awards	Best Art Direction	Iqbal Marjono	Won
2013	Maya Awards	Best Editing	Wawan I. Wibowo	Nominated
2013	Maya Awards	Best Special Effects	Andi Manoppo	Nominated
