= Sri Asih (2022 film) =

Indonesian superhero film

- Theatrical release poster
- Directed by: Upi
- Written by: Upi; Joko Anwar
- Based on: Sri Asih by R. A. Kosasih
- Produced by: Bismarka Kurniawan; Wicky V. Olindo; Joko Anwar
- Starring: Pevita Pearce; Reza Rahadian; Christine Hakim; Jefri Nichol; Dimas Anggara; Surya Saputra
- Cinematography: Arfian
- Edited by: Teguh Raharjo
- Music by: Aghi Narottama; Bemby Gusti; Tony Merle
- Production companies: Screenplay Bumilangit; SK Global; Legacy Pictures; DMMX Media; Adhya Group
- Release date: 17 November 2022 (Indonesia)
- Running time: 135 minutes
- Country: Indonesia
- Language: Indonesian

Sri Asih is a 2022 superhero film based on the Bumilangit character of the same name. The film was directed by Upi who co-wrote the screenplay with Joko Anwar. It is the second installment in the Bumilangit Cinematic Universe (BCU). And it stars Pevita Pearce as Alana / Sri Asih alongside Reza Rahadian, Christine Hakim, Jefri Nichol, Dimas Anggara, and Surya Saputra.

The film was released theatrically in Indonesia on 17 November 2022. It received five nominations at the 2023 Indonesian Film Festival.

== Premise ==
Alana does not understand why she is always overcome by anger, but she always tries to fight it. She is born during a volcanic eruption that separates her from her parents. She is then adopted by a rich woman who tries to help her live a normal life. As an adult, Alana discovers the truth about her origins that she is not an ordinary human. She can be good or be evil if she cannot control her anger.

== Cast ==
- Pevita Pearce as Alana / Sri Asih
  - Keinaya Messi Gusti as little Alana
- Reza Rahadian as Jatmiko
- Christine Hakim as Eyang Mariani
- Jefri Nichol as Tangguh
  - Quentin Stanislavski as little Tangguh
- Dimas Anggara as Kala
- Surya Saputra as Prayogo Adinegara

Additionally, there are special appearances by Dian Sastrowardoyo as Dewi Api, Najwa Shihab as Nani Wijaya, the first Sri Asih as portrayed in the 1954 film, Maudy Koesnaedi as Dewi Asih. Chicco Jerikho appears as Awang / Godam in the mid-credits scene.

== Production ==
In 2019, Joko Anwar as the creative director of Bumilangit Cinematic Universe confirmed that Pearce would portray Sri Asih for the upcoming BCU project after her first appearance on Gundala. In 2020, Anwar confirmed that a Citra-winning actor would play as the villain in the film, but still unnamed.

Principal photography began on 18 November 2020, after postponement due to COVID-19 pandemic. Later, the filming had been paused in December 2020 after Peace was tested positive for COVID-19. It concluded on 1 April 2021. Najwa Shihab portrayed Nani Wijaya, the first Sri Asih from the 1954 film, which was previously portrayed by Mimi Mariani.

== Release ==
Sri Asih was initially scheduled to be released in November 2020, with production starting seven months prior. However, the plan was scrapped due to a longer and more thorough preparation process.

The film was scheduled to be released theatrically on 6 October 2022, announced by Anwar and Upi during a Twitter Space. The release was postponed once again to 17 November 2022 after Upi's disappointment with the then-final results. It garnered 82,031 admissions on the premiere date and received 570,619 admissions during its theatrical run. The film was also screened at the 2023 International Film Festival Rotterdam during the Limelight program.

== Accolades ==
Award / Film Festival	Date of ceremony	Category	Recipient(s)	Result	Ref.
Film Pilihan Tempo	18 December 2022	Film Pilihan Tempo	Sri Asih	Nominated	
Film Pilihan Tempo	18 December 2022	Best Director	Upi	Nominated	
Film Pilihan Tempo	18 December 2022	Best Screenplay	Upi and Joko Anwar	Nominated	
Film Pilihan Tempo	18 December 2022	Best Supporting Actress	Christine Hakim	Nominated	
Indonesian Film Festival	14 November 2023	Best Adapted Screenplay	Upi and Joko Anwar	Nominated	
Indonesian Film Festival	14 November 2023	Best Visual Effects	Kalvin Irawan	Won	
Indonesian Film Festival	14 November 2023	Best Sound	Mohamad Ikhsan and M. Ichsan Rachmaditta	Nominated	
Indonesian Film Festival	14 November 2023	Best Original Score	Aghi Narottama, Tony Merle, and Bemby Gusti	Nominated	
Indonesian Film Festival	14 November 2023	Best Makeup	Aktris Handradjasa	Won	
