= Gundala (film) =

2019 sci-fi film by Joko Anwar

- Theatrical release poster
- Directed by: Joko Anwar
- Written by: Joko Anwar
- Based on: Gundala by Harya "Hasmi" Suraminata
- Produced by: Sukhdev Singh; Wicky V. Olindo; Bismarka Kurniawan
- Starring: Abimana Aryasatya; Tara Basro; Bront Palarae; Ario Bayu; Rio Dewanto
- Cinematography: Ical Tanjung
- Edited by: Dinda Amanda
- Music by: Aghi Narotama; Bemby Gusti; Tony Merle
- Production companies: Screenplay Films; Bumilangit Studios; Legacy Pictures; Ideosource Entertainment
- Distributed by: Screenplay Films
- Release dates: 28 August 2019 (Local Premiere); 29 August 2019 (Indonesia); September 11, 2019 (Toronto Internasional Film Festival)
- Running time: 123 minutes 119 minutes (TIFF)
- Country: Indonesia
- Languages: Indonesian; Javanese
- Budget: Rp30 billion ($2.11 million)
- Box office: Rp67.67 billion ($4.78 million)

Gundala is a 2019 Indonesian neo-noir superhero film based on the comics character Gundala, created by Harya Suraminata (Hasmi) in 1969. The film was co-produced by Screenplay Films and Bumilangit Studios, and distributed by Legacy Pictures. It is the first installment in the Bumilangit Cinematic Universe (BCU). The film is directed and written by Joko Anwar, and stars Abimana Aryasatya, alongside Tara Basro, Bront Palarae, Ario Bayu, Cecep Arif Rahman, Rio Dewanto, and Muzakki Ramdhan. The film depicts the efforts of security guard Sancaka, in the guise of crime-fighting vigilante Gundala, to prevent crime boss Pengkor from poisoning unborn Indonesian children.

The first official news about the film was announced on April 4, 2018, on the social media accounts of its director and production houses. At Indonesia Comic Con on October 28, 2018, a press conference was held to introduce the main casts and to hold the first screening of video footage from the film, with a release date set around mid-2019. Filming was done from September to October 2018.

Gundala had its local premiere on August 28, 2019, and was released in Indonesia on August 29, 2019. It had its international premiere at the 2019 Toronto International Film Festival on September 11, 2019. The film received positive reviews from audience and critics with praise for Abimana's performance, Anwar's direction, and the visual effects, costume design, and originality.

A sequel, Gundala the Son of Lightning, is planned as part of the first volume of films in the Bumilangit Cinematic Universe, and was announced ahead of Gundala's release.

== Plot ==
Sancaka is the astraphobic son of an Indonesian factory worker, who is joined by Sancaka as he leads a strike. As the angry workers clash with security guards, Sancaka's father is stabbed by a fellow worker and dies. In his despair, Sancaka releases lightning bolts from his body. A year later, Sancaka's mother leaves for another city to find a job, never returning. He becomes homeless in Jakarta, and meets a fellow street child, Awang, who teaches him self-defense. They plan to freighthop and travel to a safe haven in Tenggara, but only Awang is able to jump onto the train. Now an adult, Sancaka works as a guard and mechanic in a newspaper printing factory.

Most of Indonesia's assembly members are controlled by crime boss Pengkor, who commands a nationwide army of fellow orphans, raised as assassins. Pengkor plots to poison rice supplies with a drug that inhibits the ability of fetuses to distinguish right from wrong after birth; if successful, the plot will provide him with a new generation of potential recruits. Many people demand that the government release an untested antidote. Legislator Ridwan Bahri leads his colleagues in supporting the distribution of the antidote; Pengkor's allies oppose it.

One day, Sancaka helps his neighbour Wulan fend off harassing thugs. In a second fight, Sancaka is struck by lightning, reawakening his superpowers. With the help of Wulan, her little brother Teddy, and Sancaka's fellow guard Agung, Sancaka realizes his powers and creates a homemade costume to better control them. With that, Sancaka starts fighting the thugs, including violinist Adi Sulaiman, one of Pengkor's orphan agents.

The legislature passes the antidote distribution bill, but Ridwan soon discovers that the "drug" in the rice supplies is harmless; rather, the antidote is the true means of delivery, and the manufacturer is owned by a shell company under Pengkor's control. Ridwan tells Sancaka to stop distribution, causing Pengkor and his team to seize Agung, Wulan, and Teddy. Sancaka unleashes his powers, defeating most of the attackers, but Agung dies. Ridwan then shoots Pengkor. Sancaka catches up with the distribution convoy and stops it, assisted by Sri Asih. He then uses his powers to destroy all bottles containing the antidote.

At a museum, Pengkor's partner Ghazul breaks open a wall, revealing a buried ancient tomb. Having secretly extracted some of Sancaka's blood, Ghazul uses it to reattach the body within to a head, resurrecting Ki Wilawuk, a powerful medieval warrior. Ghazul informs him of Sancaka's arrival, calling him "Gundala" ("Thunder" in ancient Javanese), and Ki Wilawuk orders him to gather his army to plot revenge.

== Cast ==
- Abimana Aryasatya as Sancaka / Gundala
  A security guard who was struck by lightning, giving him superhuman powers and turning him into the superhero Gundala.
  - Muzakki Ramdhan as young Sancaka.
- Tara Basro as Sedhah Esti Wulan / Merpati
  Sancaka's neighbour and love interest, who inspires Sancaka to take up the responsibility as a superhuman and a hero.
- Bront Palarae as Pengkor
  A disfigured crime boss who controls the city's underworld. Pengkor was disfigured as a child, after his father's plantation workers burned down their house, leaving him bitter and vowing revenge on the world. "Pengkor" means "limp" in Indonesian.
  - Zayen Aqilah portrays young Pengkor.
- Ario Bayu as Ghani "Ghazul" Zulham
  Pengkor's partner and confidant, who is himself bent on world domination. The character remains nameless for most of the film, only revealing his name to Ki Wilawuk at the end of the movie. Ghazul is one of Gundala's most famous nemeses from the comics.
- Faris Fadjar Munggaran as Awang, a street kid who taught Sancaka how to fight and left Jakarta for a better life in Tenggara, where he would grew up to become the superhero Godam.
- Lukman Sardi as Ridwan Bahri
  A politician allied to Sancaka and the leader of the House of Peace.
- Arswendi Nasution as Ferry Dani, a politician who does not try to hide his disapproval of Pengkor and other legislative members on Pengkor's payroll.
- Rio Dewanto as Sangaji, Sancaka's father.
- Marissa Anita as Sancaka's mother.
- Pritt Timothy as Agung, Sancaka's mentor and co-worker.
- Paul Agusta as Anggara Sasmi, a legislative council member who appears on TV.
- Donny Alamsyah as Fadli Aziz, a local thug.
- Tanta Ginting as Ito Marbun, a local thug.
- Dea Panendra as Bonita.
- Dimas Danang as Hasbi, Ridwan Bahri's assistant.
- Zidni Hakim as Dirga Utama, a young, recently elected legislative council member who opposes Pengkor.
- Aqi Singgih as Ganda Hamdan, Pengkor's subordinate in the legislative council.
- Cecep Arif Rahman as Swara Batin the Dancer.
- Ari Tulang as Kamal Atmaja the Hypnotherapist.
- Hannah Al Rashid as Cantika the Nurse.
- Daniel Adnan as Tanto Ginanjar the Blacksmith
- Cornelio Sunny as Kanigara the Painter.
- Asmara Abigail as Desti Nikita the Student.
- Andrew Suleiman as Jack Mandagi the Chef.
- Kelly Tandiono as Mutiara Jenar the Model.
- Aming Sugandhi as Sam Buadi the Carver.
- Rendra Bagus Pamungkas as Adi Sulaiman the Composer.

Pevita Pearce makes a brief appearance at the end of the film as the superheroine Sri Asih, a character she later reprise in the standalone film directed by Upi Avianto, alongside Zack Lee, who portrays Arjuna. Senior poet, musician, and actor Sujiwo Tejo briefly appeared as Ki Wilawuk, the rumored supervillain of the film series. Cinematographer Ical Tanjung and composer Aghi Narottama make cameo appearances as one of the politicians and a pharmacist, respectively.

== Background ==
In 1981, the popularity of the Gundala comics in Indonesia reached the big screen. By purchasing the licensing from the author, PT. Cancer Mas Film adapted the comic to a film, Gundala Putra Petir (Gundala, the Son of Lightning), which was directed by Citra Award-winning director Lilik Sudjio. Teddy Purba, the actor who was appointed as Ir. Sancaka or Gundala, was famous as one of the best Indonesian action stars at that time. His mortal enemy, Ghazul, was played by the character actor W. D. Mochtar, while Sancaka's lover, Minarti, was played by Anna Tairas. Other actors and actresses involved in the film included Ami Priyono, August Melasz, Pitrajaya Burnama, HIM Damsyik, Gordon Subandono, A. Hamid Arief, Rini Ratih, Dewanti, and Ratno Timoer. Even though the setting was changed from that of the comics, the film remained faithful to the story told in the comics series written by Hasmi – in which an engineer, Sancaka, managed to find a chemical anti-lightning-strike formula. Unfortunately, this discovery resulted in Sancaka having to break up with his lover, Minarti, after forgetting to attend her birthday party. Plagued by sadness, and in the midst of a heavy rain, Sancaka was struck by lightning and taken to the world of Emperor Kronz. There, he was given the powers and costume that turned him into Gundala. Meanwhile, a group of organizations, led by Ghazul, began the rampant circulation of narcotics; that is when the battle between good against evil began.

In 2010, Iskandar Salim, a photographer and graphic designer, created promotional material for a movie that was not being made about Gundala, after noticing that there had never been a movie featuring an Indonesian superhero and wishing to start a public debate on the subject. He created an official website, a Facebook page, posters, and staged photographs that allegedly showed the movie being made. As a result of the attention generated by this hoax, Gundala's creator, Hasmi, became involved in negotiations to produce a real film based on the character.

== Development and production ==
=== Development ===
Bumilangit Studios, as the owner of Gundala's intellectual property, has been developing the idea of making a Gundala movie since 2014. The search for the right director and scriptwriter for Gundala was not easy, and took Bumilangit years to finally find the perfect match. On April 4, 2018, Joko Anwar was announced as the writer and the director for the film. He is one of Indonesia's most prolific and celebrated film directors.

Joko Anwar admitted that the scriptwriting process for Gundala has been the hardest work of his career so far. Usually, he spends one to two months on a typical script, but he eventually ended up spending a total of seven months for this project. Reinterpreting Gundala's origin from the original 1969 comic, he reworked the story in a way that could attract Millennials and Gen Z. Hasmi's comics and notes about Gundala helped him write the script.

=== Production ===
Gundala's costume was a team effort between Iwan Nazif (Bumilangit Creative Engine) and Chris Lie (Caravan Studio). The production was handled by Quantum Creations FX, based in Los Angeles, known for their works in Daredevil, Watchmen, Supergirl, The Hunger Games, Star Trek, and Iron Man.

Filming for Gundala took 53 days in 70 locations, including Jakarta, Cilegon, and Purwakarta, and involved 1,500 extras and 300 film crew. Principal photography began in Purwakarta on September 1, 2018, with Ical Tanjung serving as director of photography. Filming wrapped on October 31, 2018.

Post-production began in November 2018, and was completed around June 2019. Gundala involved many of the best film workers in Indonesia, one of them being Khikmawan Santosa, who often won the Best Sound Designer award at the prestigious Indonesian Film Festival. Gundala was one of his last projects before his death on May 11, 2019.

== Music ==
One of the songs complementing the film was the 1962 song "The End of the World", popularized by Skeeter Davis. The production team agreed that the lyrics represent the main theme of the film; when many people in a country do not upheld justice, they will head on towards the "end of the world".

== Marketing ==
In order to raise public awareness regarding Gundala, M&C! and Koloni have published two types of Gundala comics, a remastered version of the classic Gundala comics (published in July 2019), and new Gundala comics adapted from the events of the film (published in August 2019). The remastered version targets the fans of the Gundala comics' original 1970s–1980s run and collectors of Indonesian old-school comics, while the film tie-in version targets Indonesian millennials, who may not have been aware of Gundala before. The Gundala comics is also available in digital form on WEBTOON, targeting Indonesian teenagers who frequently access the platform. Koloni, along with Gramedia and Bumilangit, also held several roadshows around Indonesia. The Gundala film roadshow began on June 15, 2019 in Jakarta.

== Release ==
Gundala had its local premiere on August 28, 2019, and was in released in Indonesia on August 29, 2019. It had its international premiere at the 2019 Toronto International Film Festival on September 11, 2019. It was acquired by Premiere Entertainment Group, who began shopping the film to domestic and international buyers at the AFM on November 9, 2019.

On April 30, 2020, Well Go USA Entertainment announced it would be releasing Gundala via digital, Blu-ray, and DVD in North America on July 28, 2020.

== Reception ==
=== Box office ===
Throughout its domestic run, the film garnered over 1.6 million admissions, with an estimate gross of $4.7 million.

=== Critical response ===
On review aggregator Rotten Tomatoes, the film holds an 83% approval rating, based on six reviews, with an average rating of 7/10 as of October 2021.

Richard Kuipers wrote for Variety that the film is "an action-packed and emotionally satisfying adaptation of the treasured Indonesian comic book created by Harya "Hasmi" Suraminata." Victor Stiff from ThatShelf.com praised the film, stating, "From beginning to end, Gundala delivers fast and furious action and rarely stops to take its foot off the gas."

== Accolades ==
Year	Award	Category	Recipient	Result
2019	39th Citra Awards	Best Actor	Abimana Aryastaya	Nominated
2019	39th Citra Awards	Best Adapted Screenplay	Joko Anwar	Nominated
2019	39th Citra Awards	Best Cinematography	Ical Tanjung	Won
2019	39th Citra Awards	Best Art Direction	Wencislaus	Nominated
2019	39th Citra Awards	Best Original Score	Aghi Narottama; Bembi Gusti; Tony Merle	Nominated
2019	39th Citra Awards	Best Sound	Khikmawan Santosa; Mohamad Ikhsan; Anhar Moha	Won
2019	39th Citra Awards	Best Visual Effects	Abby Eldipie	Won
2019	39th Citra Awards	Best Costume Design	Isabelle Patrice	Nominated
2019	39th Citra Awards	Best Makeup & Hairstyling	Darwyn Tse	Nominated
2019	8th Maya Awards	Best Actor in a Leading Role	Abimana Aryastaya	Nominated
2019	8th Maya Awards	Best Cinematography	Ical Tanjung	Nominated
2019	8th Maya Awards	Best Art Direction	Wencislaus	Nominated
2019	8th Maya Awards	Best Original Score	Aghi Narottama; Bembi Gusti; Tony Merle	Won
2019	8th Maya Awards	Best Sound	Khikmawan Santosa; Mohamad Ikhsan; Anhar Moha	Won
2019	8th Maya Awards	Best Visual Effects	Abby Eldipie	Nominated
2019	8th Maya Awards	Best Costume Design	Isabelle Patrice	Nominated
2019	8th Maya Awards	Best Poster Design	Caravan Studio	Nominated
2019	8th Maya Awards	Best Young Performer	Muzakki Ramdhan	Won
2019	8th Maya Awards	Arifin C. Noer Cup for Best Brief Appearance	Pevita Pearce	Nominated
2019	3rd Tempo Film Festival	Best Actor	Abimana Aryastaya	Nominated
2019	3rd Tempo Film Festival	Best Supporting Actor	Bront Palarae	Nominated
2020	Asian Film Festival	Best Art Direction	Wencislaus	Nominated
