= Alas Roban the Series =

Indonesian supernatural television series

- Genre: Horror; Supernatural
- Based on: Alas Roban
- Screenplay by: Dono Indarto
- Directed by: Sondang Pratama
- Starring: Michelle Ziudith; Fara Shakila; Ben Joshua; Laura Theux; Imelda Therinne; Antonio Blanco Jr.
- Theme music composer: Ofel Obaja
- Opening theme: "Alas Roban" by Arcell & Glo
- Ending theme: "Alas Roban" bg Arcell & Glo
- Composer: Joseph S. Djafar
- Country of origin: Indonesia
- Original languages: Indonesia; Javanese
- No. of seasons: 1
- No. of episodes: 4

Production
- Executive producer: Evy Ruslie
- Producer: Oswin Bonifanz
- Cinematography: Catur Rizki Saputro
- Editor: Gita Miaji
- Camera setup: Multi-camera
- Running time: 50 minutes
- Production company: Unlimited Production

Original release
- Network: Netflix
- Release: 18 October 2026 – present
- Network: ANTV
- Release: 19 October 2026 – present

Alas Roban the Series is an Indonesian supernatural television series. It premiered on 18 October 2026 on Netflix and 19 October 2026 on ANTV. This series is produced by Unlimited Production and adapted from 2026 film with the same title. It starred Michelle Ziudith, Ben Joshua, Laura Theux, Antonio Blanco Jr., and Christ Laurent.

== Plot ==
Sita is a single mother raising her daughter, Gendis, who is visually impaired.

Amidst the struggles of daily life, Sita clings to the hope that her husband, Ramdan, will return. Five years earlier, Ramdan mysteriously vanished in the Alas Roban area, leaving behind no definitive answers.

Yet, time has failed to erase the questions that continue to haunt Sita. When strange occurrences begin to disrupt her life, she resolves to uncover the truth about what really happened to her husband.

That decision marks the beginning of a perilous journey, as every clue draws her closer to a lurking threat that endangers both her and Gendis.

Amidst the escalating tension, Anto and Yoga step in to help protect Sita and her daughter. But can they withstand the mysterious forces shrouding Alas Roban? And will Sita’s quest lead her to the truth about Ramdan’s disappearance, or drag her into even greater danger?

== Cast ==
=== Main ===
- Michelle Ziudith as Sita: Ramdan's wife; Gendis' mother; Tika's sister
- Fara Shakila as Gendis: Ramdan and Sita's daughter
- Ben Joshua as Anto
- Laura Theux as Tika: Sita's sister; Singgih's wife
- Imelda Therinne as Dewi Raras
- Christ Laurent as Yoga
- Antonio Blanco Jr. as Angga

=== Recurring ===
- Arie Dwi Andhika as Singgih: Tika's husband
- Omar Daniel as Ramdan: Sita's husband; Gendis' father
- Dewi Pakis as Emah
- Malvino Fajaro as Dimas
- Reiner Manopo as Joko
- Djerry Dzaky as Jatmiko: Lastri's husband; Hanum's father
- Fredy Amin as Danu
- Ayu Inten as Lastri: Jatmiko's wife; Hanum's mother
- Aida Sofia as Hanum: Jatmiko and Lastri's daughter
- Vanel Anggara as Sigit
- Brandon Bachtiar as Didi
- Reka Della as Naya

== Production ==
=== Development ===
In September 2026, ANTV announced a new series titled Alas Roban the Series.

=== Casting ===
Michelle Ziudith to reprise her role of Sita in the series. Faiz Kurniawan, the Regent of Bantang, also appears in the series.
