= Angkerbatu =

2007 Indonesian horror film

- Directed by: Jose Poernomo
- Written by: Hilman Mutasi, Jose Poernomo
- Produced by: Jose Poernomo
- Cinematography: Yadi Sugandi
- Music by: Float
- Distributed by: Liquid Media
- Release date: 26 April 2007
- Running time: 87 minutes
- Country: Indonesia
- Language: Indonesian

Angkerbatu (lit. 'Haunted Rock') is a 2007 Indonesian horror film directed by Jose Poernomo.

== Plot ==
The film is set in the eponymous fictional town of Angkerbatu and follows Indonesian crew members of a Korean television broadcasting network. They set out to investigate the disappearance of two colleagues during an assignment in the town.

== Cast ==
- Mieke Amalia as Kanaya: A television news reporter and member of the crew investigating the disappearance of her colleagues
- Susilo Badar as Warno: A television producer and member of the crew investigating the disappearance of his colleagues
- Yama Carlos as Yudha: A driver for the television crew
- Imelda Therinne
- Dan Kim
- Nuri Maulida as Manda: A reporter who disappeared in Angkerbatu
- Bayu S. Virguna as Rino: A cameraman who disappeared in Angkerbatu
- Evi Tamala

== Development ==
Angkerbatu is an adaptation of a novel of the same title by Ruwi Meita. Director Jose Poernomo labeled the genre of the film as "atmospheric horror". He also noted that the novel tells the story of the film in greater detail. The film received a premiere screening on 21 April 2007, and it opened in theaters on 26 April. It was one of a "deluge" of Indonesian horror films released in 2007.

== Reception ==
Unlike Jose Poernomo's 2001 film Jelangkung, whose success was credited with reviving the Indonesian horror film genre, Angkerbatu was panned by critics, who were not impressed with the film despite it being promoted as having the same production team as Jelangkung. Public opinion of Angkerbatu prior to its release was negative, calling the film "cheesy" and accusing it of piggybacking on the popularity of horror films. Film critic Ekky Imanjaya lamented the absence of religious elements from the film, such as a religious teacher or prayer to ward off demons, a contrast to Jelangkung. He noted that the film reintroduced the recurring comic relief character Bokir, which had been absent from Indonesian films since 2000.
