= Imelda Therinne =

Indonesian actress

- Born: Imelda Therinne; 19 May 1982 (age 44); Jakarta, Indonesia
- Occupations: Actress; Model
- Years active: 2004–present
- Spouse: Aldijan Diah (m. 2010)
- Children: 2
- Parent(s): Ridwan D. Tamin (father); Thelma D. Tamin (mother)

Imelda Therinne (born in Jakarta, Indonesia on 19 May 1982) is an Indonesian actress and model of Minangkabau descent.

== Career ==
She began her career as a model at the age of 17, and first became popular with the public after starring the movie Angker Batu in 2007. That same year, she starred in the comedy film Quickie Express, about three young gigolos. In 2013, she starred the thriller-horror film Belenggu. Her work as the character Jingga won her the "Best Actress" award and a nomination for "Favorite Actress" at the 2013 Indonesian Movie Awards.

== Personal life ==
Imelda Therinne was born on 19 May 1982, in Jakarta. She is the only child of Ridwan D. Tamin and Thelma D. Tamin. On 7 August 2010, she married Aldijan Diah at Le Méridien. Her dowry was 102 kg (225 lb) of gold.

== Filmography ==
=== Film ===
Year	Title	Role	Notes
2004	Buruan Cium Gue	Amel	Supporting role
2007	Medley	Dian Wardhani	Supporting role
2007	Angker Batu	A Woman	Supporting role
2007	Quickie Express	Sexy Nurse	Supporting role
2008	Kuntilanak 3	Asti	Lead role
2009	Heart-Break.com	Audrey	Supporting role
2009	Rumah Dara	Maya	Supporting role
2010	I Know What You Did on Facebook	Marlene	Supporting role
2012	Hi5teria	Vita	Segment: "Palasik"
2013	Belenggu	Jingga	Lead role Won – 2013 Indonesian Movie Awards for Best Actress; Nominated – 2013 Indonesian Movie Awards for Favorite Actress
2016	The Professionals	Nicole	Lead Role; Nominated — 2017 Indonesian Movie Actors Awards for Best Actress
2022	Pulang	Santi	

=== Television ===
Year	Title	Role	Notes	Network
2002	ABG			RCTI
2004	Kau Dan Aku			RCTI
2005	Hikmah 2	Eva	Supporting role	RCTI
2006	Diatas Sajadah Cinta			Trans TV
2008	Elegi		Lead role	Astro Aruna
2013	Yang Masih Dibawah Umur			RCTI
2013	Tendangan Dari Langit The Series	Cio's mom	Supporting role	RCTI
2013	Surat Kecil Untuk Tuhan The Series	Dita	Supporting role	RCTI
2013–2014	Fortune Cookies	Donna	Supporting role	RCTI
2017	Bawang Merah Bawang Putih	Ibu Tiri	Supporting Role	Trans TV
2023	Blood Curse	Astuti	Recurring role	Disney+ Hotstar
2026	Alas Roban the Series	Dewi Raras	Lead role	ANTV and Netflix

== Awards and nominations ==
Year	Award	Category	Nominated work	Result	Ref.
2013	Indonesian Film Festival	Citra Award for Best Leading Actress	Belenggu	Nominated	
