= Superhero film =

Film genre revolving around superheroes

The superhero film is a film genre categorized by the presence of superhero characters, individuals with extraordinary abilities who are dedicated to fighting crime, saving the world, or helping the innocent. It is sometimes considered a sub-genre of the action film genre and has evolved into one of the most financially successful film genres worldwide. These films focus on superhuman abilities, advanced technology, mystical phenomena, or exceptional physical and mental skills that enable these heroes to fight for the common good or defeat a supervillain antagonist.

Superhero films typically include genre elements of romance, comedy, fantasy, and science fiction, with large instances of the superhero genre predominantly occupied and produced by American media franchises DC and Marvel, originally adaptations of their existing works of superhero comic books. Individual superhero films frequently contain a character's origin story.

== History ==
=== 1936–1978: Early years ===
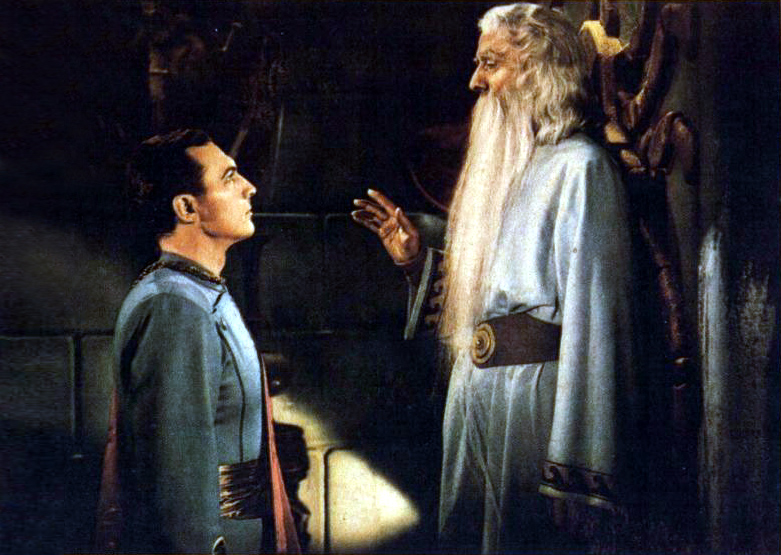
Adventures of Captain Marvel (by Republic Pictures, 1941)

Superhero stories initially gained popularity through comic books and were later adapted into film serials. Early examples include Flash Gordon (1936), Mandrake the Magician (1939), The Shadow (1940), Adventures of Captain Marvel (1941), Batman (1943), The Phantom (1943), Captain America (1944), and Superman (1948).

Between 1941 and 1942, Fleischer Studios produced a series of eight animated cartoons and one additional short based on the Superman comic book. Famous Studios, the successor of Fleischer Studios, created eight more cartoons between 1942 and 1943.

In the following decades, the decline of Saturday matinée showings of serials and turmoil in the comic book industry slowed superhero motion picture production greatly, although films were still being produced. These films included Superman and the Mole Men (1951), starring George Reeves, and Batman (1966), a big-screen extension of the Batman television series starring Adam West. Superman and the Mole Men was a pilot for the TV series Adventures of Superman. Compilations of the series were later released theatrically.

==== Tokusatsu ====
In 1957, Shinto Ho produced the first film serial featuring the Tokusatsu superhero character Super Giant, marking a shift in Japanese popular culture toward masked superheroes in Tokusatsu. The Super Giant film series and Astro Boy heavily influenced later Japanese Tokusatsu superhero films. Moonlight Mask also became popular around that time, with six films retelling the story of the TV series. Another early Japanese superhero film was Ōgon Bat (1966), starring Sonny Chiba, based on the 1931 Kamishibai superhero Ōgon Bat.

==== Kaiju films ====
Although kaiju movies, or movies featuring kaiju monsters, do not typically fall under the superhero category, the kaiju monster Godzilla, originally a villain, transitioned into a superhero role in subsequent films. Godzilla has been described as "the original radioactive superhero" because his nuclear origin story predates Spider-Man's 1962 debut. However, Godzilla did not become a hero until Ghidorah, the Three-Headed Monster (1964). By the 1970s, Godzilla was viewed as a superhero, with the magazine King of the Monsters describing Godzilla in 1977 as the "Superhero of the '70s." Donald F. Glut wrote that Godzilla was "the most universally popular superhero of 1977."

1966 saw the debut of the Ultra Series with the kaiju TV show Ultra Q. With the release of the original Ultraman, the franchise started focusing on superheroes and the series averaged an audience rating of 36.8% through its first 39 episodes. In 1967, Ultraman started expanding to films. Early films, such as Ultraman: Monster Movie Feature, were compilations or theatrical releases of TV show episodes. The first original Ultraman film was The 6 Ultra Brothers vs. the Monster Army, a co-production with Thailand.

The popularity of television superheroes in Japan led to the Kamen Rider and Super Sentai franchises by manga artist Shotaro Ishinomori in 1971 and 1975, respectively. As with Ultraman, many early Kamen Rider and Super Sentai episodes were released as films. Original Kamen Rider films released before 1978 include Kamen Rider vs. Shocker, Kamen Rider vs. Ambassador Hell, Kamen Rider V3 vs. Destron Mutants, and Five Riders vs. King Dark.

Original superhero characters emerged in other, more comedy-oriented films, such as the French political satire film Mr. Freedom (1969), the Polish parody Hydrozagadka (1970), and the American B movies Rat Pfink a Boo Boo (1966) and The Wild World of Batwoman (1966).

=== 1978–1998: Rising popularity ===
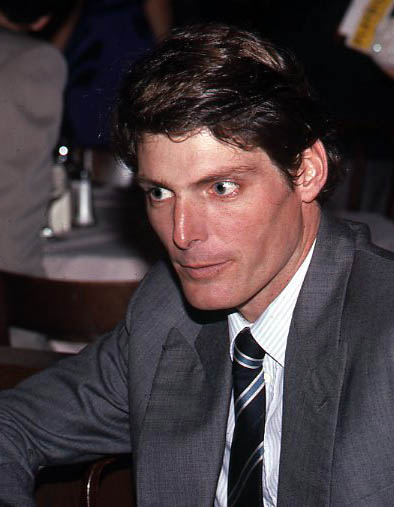
Christopher Reeve in 1985

In 1973, producer Ilya Salkind convinced his father Alexander to buy the film rights to Superman. They hired Mario Puzo to pen a two-film script and negotiated with Steven Spielberg to direct, though Alexander eventually landed on Richard Donner. Superman (1978) and Superman II (1980) were shot simultaneously.

Following the success of Star Wars, Richard Donner's Superman (1978), the first big-budget DC feature film, was a critical and commercial success. The same year, Toei Company's Spider-Man reimagining and the first Super Sentai crossover film, JAKQ Dengekitai vs. Gorenger, were released. Other entries emerged throughout the 1980s, including Eight Riders vs. Galaxy King (1980), Kamen Rider Super-1: The Movie (1981), Richard Lester's Superman II (1981), Spider-Man: The Dragon's Challenge (1981), and Paul Verhoeven's RoboCop (1987). These were followed by Kamen Rider Black: Hurry to Onigashima and Kamen Rider Black: Terrifying! The Phantom House of Devil Pass, released in 1988. The success of Tim Burton's Batman (1989) and its direct follow-up, Batman Returns (1992), spawned the DC Animated Universe.

One of the first superhero films of the 1990s was Marvel's Captain America (1990), which did not have a theatrical release. Roger Corman's The Fantastic Four (1994) was produced solely to maintain the film rights to the property and was not released theatrically or on home video.

Alex Proyas' The Crow (1994) became the first independent comic superhero franchise film. The film introduced a new level of violence to a younger audience, bridging the gap between superhero and modern action films. The success of The Crow may have influenced the release of a film version of Spawn (1997), Image Comics's leading character. After Marvel bought Malibu Comics (which owned The Men in Black comic series), Marvel and Columbia Pictures released Men in Black in 1997. This film was the first Marvel property to win an Academy Award and, at the time, was the highest-grossing comic book adaptation. While commercially successful, Joel Schumacher's Batman & Robin (1997) was critically panned for its campiness and deviation from the darker style of the series' first two films directed by Tim Burton. Some have cited it as a factor in the temporary decline of the superhero film sub-genre.

In Japan in the 1990s, original Ultraman films became more common. In 1996, Tsuburaya released Ultraman Zearth, which parodied the original TV series and later installments. The following year, the sequel titled Ultraman Zearth 2: Superhuman Big Battle - Light and Shadow premiered.

=== 1998–2007: Further rise ===
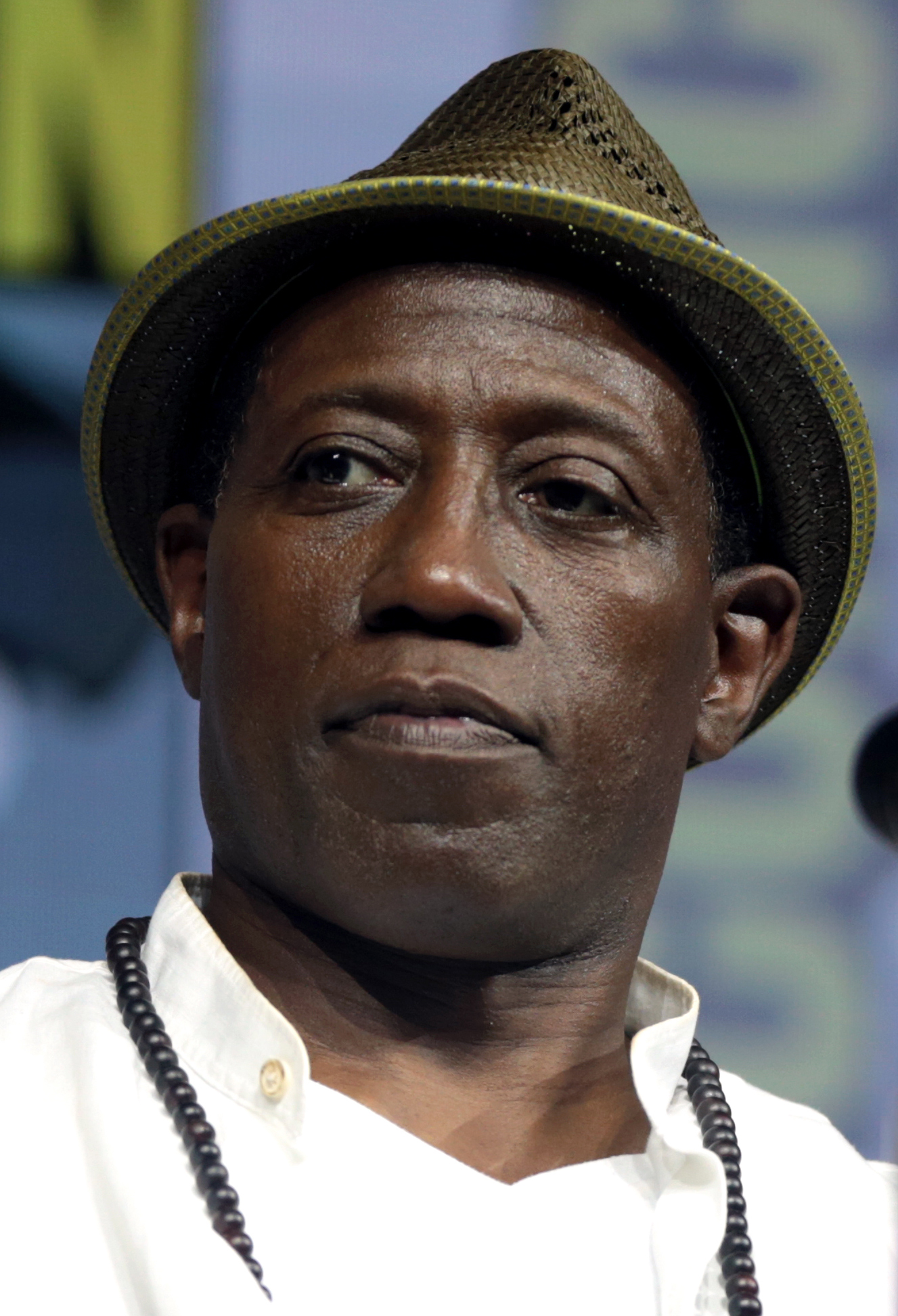
Wesley Snipes starred as Blade in the Blade films.

In 1998, Marvel released Blade, a darker superhero film blended with traditional action and horror elements. The title character possesses the powers of a vampire and an arsenal of weaponry. The success of Blade is considered the beginning of Marvel's film success and a catalyst for further comic book film adaptations. Blade II was released in 2002.

Adam Sternberg of Vulture stated that The Matrix (1999) was influenced by comic books, cyberpunk fiction, Japanese anime, and Hong Kong action films. He also credits the film and its incorporation of Computer-Generated Imagery (CGI) with reinventing the superhero film by setting the template for modern superhero blockbusters. According to Sternberg, this inspired the superhero renaissance in the early 21st century. John Kenneth Muir, in The Encyclopedia of Superheroes on Film and Television, describes The Matrix as a re-imagination of movie visuals, paving the way for the visuals of later superhero films. He credits it with helping to "make comic-book superheroes hip." He notes that the bullet-time effect successfully demonstrates the concept of "faster than a speeding bullet" onscreen.

In Japan, following the success of the Kamen Rider Kuuga television series, a new era of the Kamen Rider franchise began, leading to the production of annual Kamen Rider movies, starting with Kamen Rider Agito: Project G4 in 2001.

The popularity of the Ultraman Tiga TV series led to several films based on it and later installments, including Ultraman Tiga & Ultraman Dyna: Warriors of the Star of Light (1998), Ultraman Gaia: The Battle in Hyperspace (1999), and Ultraman Tiga: The Final Odyssey (2000).

Sam Raimi's release of Spider-Man (2002) has been credited as establishing the modern blueprint for the modern-day superhero blockbuster format, at a time when superhero movies were widely regarded as a "dead genre walking." Raimi's tone proved so successful that the ensuing Marvel Cinematic Universe has been described as being "forged in his image."

=== 2008–present: Ubiquity of the MCU and DCEU and the expansion to streaming services ===
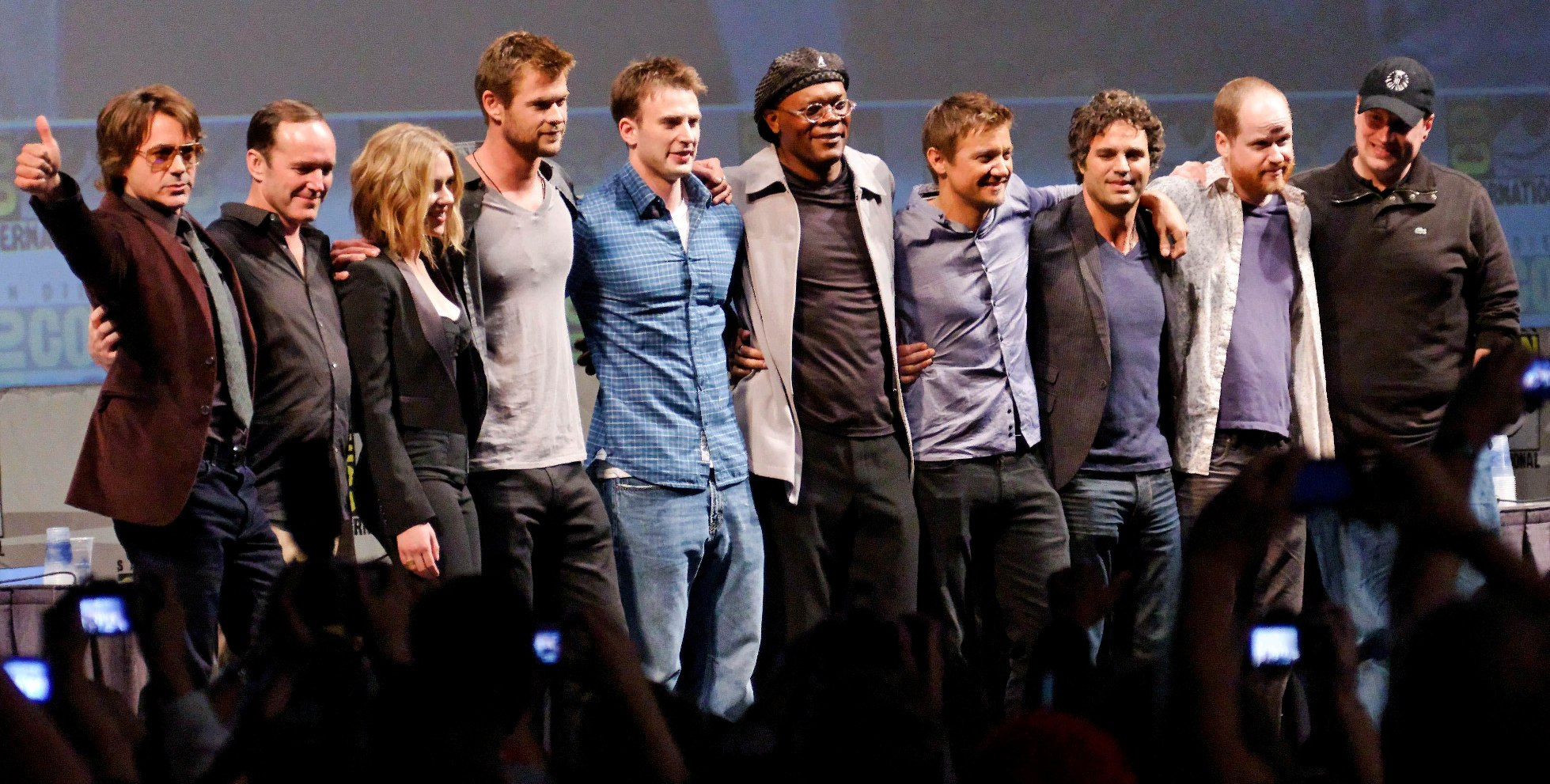
The cast of Marvel's The Avengers (2012), a commercially successful superhero film and a key entry in the Marvel Cinematic Universe.

==== 2008–2014 ====
The release of Iron Man in 2008 began the Marvel Cinematic Universe (MCU). A few months later, The Dark Knight was released to widespread critical acclaim and became the first superhero movie to make over $1 billion at the worldwide box office. 2009 saw the release of Watchmen and X-Men Origins: Wolverine. The 2010s saw continued success for superhero films both culturally and economically, taking the sub-genre's success and ubiquity to new heights. Matthew Vaughn's adaptation of Kick-Ass was released in 2010, followed by Iron Man 2 a month later. 2011 releases included The Green Hornet, Green Lantern, and X-Men: First Class. After referencing the "Avengers Initiative" in the Iron Man films and The Incredible Hulk, Marvel released Thor in May 2011, followed by Captain America: The First Avenger in July 2011.

While Ghost Rider: Spirit of Vengeance (2012) had little audience interest, three superhero films made it to the top ten in the box office chart for the year, both in the US and internationally. These were The Avengers (May 2012), The Dark Knight Rises (July 2012), and The Amazing Spider-Man (July 2012).

A Superman Returns sequel was planned for 2009 but was delayed and later scrapped in favor of Man of Steel (2013), a reboot of the Superman franchise.

At the 2012 San Diego Comic-Con, Marvel confirmed an Ant-Man movie was in development, as well as a film based on the 2008 comic book series Guardians of the Galaxy, which was released in August 2014. Iron Man 3 was released in May 2013, Thor: The Dark World in November 2013, and Captain America: The Winter Soldier in April 2014. The Amazing Spider-Man 2, the sequel to the 2012 reboot, was released in May 2014. A sequel to the 2009 film X-Men Origins: Wolverine, titled The Wolverine was released in 2013. In 2014, X-Men: Days of Future Past was released.

In 2014, Italian filmmaker Gabriele Salvatores directed a superhero-fantasy film titled Il Ragazzo Invisible (The Invisible Boy), which won the Young Audience Award at the 2015 European Film Awards.

==== 2015–2018 ====
An Avengers sequel, titled Avengers: Age of Ultron, was released in May 2015. Following the success of the Marvel Cinematic Universe, rival DC also planned to make and produce their own shared film universe called the DC Extended Universe (DCEU), which tied back to the release of Man of Steel in 2013. A sequel titled Batman v Superman: Dawn of Justice was scheduled for release in May 2016 but was postponed to March 2016. The SpongeBob Movie: Sponge Out of Water, a 2015 Nickelodeon film, features the main characters transforming into superheroes. 20th Century Fox rebooted the Fantastic Four series and released Fantastic Four in August 2015.

On March 9, 2015, publishing house Valiant Comics made a nine-figure deal with Chinese company DMG Entertainment to produce their series of superhero movies set in their cinematic universe. The series was co-produced by Sony Pictures and started with a movie adaptation of Bloodshot for a 2020 release, followed by Harbinger, both movies receiving a sequel and ending in a crossover movie based on the Harbinger Wars arc from the comic books.

In 2015, Italian filmmaker Gabriele Mainetti directed the superhero film They Call Me Jeeg starring Claudio Santamaria. Its original title is Lo Chiamavano Jeeg Robot, from the Italian name of the anime and manga series Steel Jeeg. It was released in Italy on February 25, 2016.

The eighth installment in the X-Men series, Deadpool, was released in February 2016. It became the highest-grossing R-rated film of all time (when adjusted for inflation) and the highest-grossing film of the series. The ninth instalment, X-Men: Apocalypse, was released in May. Warner Bros. released Batman v Superman: Dawn of Justice, the first film to feature both Batman and Superman, in March 2016. Suicide Squad, released in August, featured a team of antihero/supervillains. Batman v Superman: Dawn of Justice and Suicide Squad are in the DCEU.

In May 2016, Marvel Studios released Captain America: Civil War, where the Avengers split into opposing factions. In October, Max Steel, based on Mattel's eponymous toy line, was released. In November of the same year, Marvel Studios released Doctor Strange, which recounts the superhero origin of Stephen Strange.

The first Finnish superhero film, Rendel: Dark Vengeance, was released in September 2017, and it won the Best Action Movie award at the Erratum Film Festival in Mexico. Power Rangers, a movie reboot of the TV series, was released in March, with Lionsgate planning a seven-film franchise. The film Logan, which was Hugh Jackman's and Patrick Stewart's last appearances as their characters in the X-Men film series before Disney acquired 20th Century Fox, was the first ever canon X-Men movie to be rated R and the first superhero movie to receive an Academy Award for Best Adapted Screenplay. In the summer movie season, Guardians of the Galaxy Vol. 2, Wonder Woman, and Spider-Man: Homecoming confirmed the superhero film domination in the mainstream movie market. That trend continued into the fall with the success of Thor: Ragnarök. Due to this, Warner Bros. attempted to have a shared universe media franchise, the DCEU, with Justice League, though this was poorly received and a box office disappointment.

In February 2018, Marvel Studios released Black Panther, featuring the solo film adaptation of the first mainstream African American superhero, the Black Panther, a commercial and critical success in the MCU franchise. It became the first superhero film nominated for the Academy Award for Best Picture.

This MCU project was soon followed up by Avengers: Infinity War, released in April 2018, which earned both critical acclaim and worldwide financial success, earning more than $2 billion. Soon after, 20th Century Fox released Deadpool 2 in May 2018. In addition, Incredibles 2's wide release in June 2018 was met with considerable critical acclaim and earned $182.68 million during its premiere weekend. The next superhero film in the MCU, Ant-Man and the Wasp, was released on July 6th.

The antihero film Venom, based on the comic book character of the same name, was released in October 2018 to poor reviews but box-office success. In December 2018, Warner Bros. released Aquaman, a film about the DC Comics superhero of the same name, marking the biggest box office success for the DCEU, grossing $1.152 billion worldwide.

==== 2019–present ====
Marvel's Captain Marvel was released in March 2019 and faced online hostility, originating from star Brie Larson's comments about the lack of diversity in the film and film criticism industries. Despite the controversy, it earned over $1 billion worldwide and received largely positive reviews. Later in April, the DCEU's Shazam!, featuring the lead character who was previously known as Captain Marvel, had decent box office success for a relatively low budget, which has been seen as further evidence of the revitalization of the Warner Bros. media franchise. That same month, Avengers: Endgame ended the Infinity Saga to widespread acclaim, broke numerous box office records, and became the fastest film to exceed $1 billion worldwide, doing so in just five days. Avengers: Endgame became the highest-grossing film of all time, surpassing James Cameron's Avatar before the latter reclaimed its place in 2021.

By contrast, the X-Men film Dark Phoenix performed poorly—critically and financially—upon release in June. Afterwards, X-Men and the Fantastic Four entered the MCU with Disney's acquisition of 20th Century Fox. However, neither franchise would receive a standalone film in the MCU until 2024's Deadpool & Wolverine, and 2025's The Fantastic Four: First Steps. In July 2019, Phase 3 of the MCU was concluded with the Marvel and Sony co-produced film Spider-Man: Far From Home, which was released to critical and commercial success.

In 2019, Hellboy, the first reboot of Guillermo del Toro's Hellboy franchise, was released to negative reviews from critics for its R rating and gore, and was a box office flop. In August 2019, Joko Anwar's Gundala was released in Indonesia. It screened at the Toronto International Film Festival in September. It was the first entry in the Bum Langit Cinematic Universe (BCU) film series, which is based on characters from comic books published by Bum Langit. The second and third films in the series, Sri Asih and Patriot Taruna: Virgo and the Sparkling's, were announced for a 2020 release but were pushed back to 2021 as the COVID-19 pandemic significantly delayed production. The production company's strategy of announcing films in volumes with a team-up film as the climax has led to the media dubbing it the "Indonesian equivalent to the MCU and DCEU".

In 2020, Birds of Prey and Bloodshot received limited theatrical releases due to the COVID-19 pandemic; Birds of Prey received positive reviews and Bloodshot received negative reviews. Despite being released during the COVID-19, The Old Guard was released on Netflix to positive reviews while the DCEU's Wonder Woman 1984 was released to mixed reviews from critics and audiences worldwide. In the middle of the COVID-19 pandemic, 20th Century Fox's X-Men movie The New Mutants was released to negative reviews and was a box office flop, marking the end of the X-Men film series.

The Suicide Squad was released in August but was a box office disappointment despite receiving positive reviews. The poor performance was attributed to the disruption of cinema during the COVID-19 pandemic (particularly the Delta variant) and confusion from the general audience on whether the film was a sequel, reboot, or remake. Meanwhile, Marvel's Shang-Chi and the Legend of the Ten Rings broke Labor Day records, while similar successes were seen in Sony's Spider-Man Universe (SSU) film Venom: Let There Be Carnage. Despite mediocre reviews and the first rotten rating for an MCU film on Rotten Tomatoes, Eternals opened to moderate success at the box office.

Spider-Man: No Way Home was released in December 2021, and became the highest-grossing film of 2021, the highest-grossing film of all time, the third-highest-grossing film in the United States and Canada, the highest-grossing Spider-Man film, and the highest-grossing film produced by Sony. It also became the first film to gross over $1 billion since Star Wars: The Rise of Skywalker, mainly due to the COVID-19 pandemic, as well as the highest-grossing film not to be released in China (one of the world's biggest box office markets).

In 2022, Warner Bros. released The Batman, a reboot of the Batman film series, unconnected to the DC Extended Universe. It was a critical and commercial hit, with praise for the film being a grounded detective story, due to Matt Reeves' direction and Robert Pattinson's performance as the titular hero. It became the second biggest pandemic debut, after Spider-Man: No Way Home. Morbius, starring Jared Leto and based on the Spider-Man villain of the same name, debuted that April as another chapter in Sony's Spider-Man Universe. The film was critically panned and a box-office bomb. Variety reported that whilst the initial opening was hopeful for Morbius, "the character is not nearly as recognizable to general audiences as Spider-Man, Batman or Venom, nor is the film connected to a larger story like Eternals or Shang-Chi and the Legend of the Ten Rings. Thus, Morbius wasn't expected to match the receipts for recent comic book tent-poles based on those characters." Scott Mendelson further stated Sony seemed to rely on the film's connection to the Spider-Man universe, the success of Venom, and a misguided assumption that audiences were interested in villain movies.

In May 2022, Sam Raimi returned to the superhero genre with Doctor Strange in the Multiverse of Madness. The film was met with mixed-to-positive reviews and earned $187 million on its opening weekend. It became the eleventh-best domestic debut of all time, the best summer debut for a Disney release during the pandemic, and Raimi's best opening. The film earned $61 million in its second weekend, becoming one of the MCU's most significant second-weekend box office drops. The 67% decline was attributed by Deadline Hollywood to the "bad word of mouth" on the film and its CinemaScore grade. At the same time, Intelligence saw more than a 17% downsize of available seats for the film, resulting in fewer showtimes, which also led to the decline. In its third weekend, the film earned $31.6 million, contributing to the 800-million-dollar mark at the box office to become Hollywood's second-highest-grossing film released during the pandemic behind No Way Home. The film earned $16.4 million in its fourth weekend, contributing to the total box office that helped it to become the highest-grossing film of 2022, previously held by The Batman. As of June 2022, the film stands as the 11th highest-grossing of the MCU worldwide. on October 21st, the DCEU released the film Black Adam to mixed reviews and it was a failure at the box office as it failed to break even at the box office, grossing $393 million against a budget of $190–$260 million. Much like Black Adam, the MCU movie Thor: Love and Thunder was released mixed reviews. However Black Panther: Wakanda Forever was released to positive reviews.

In 2023, a majority of the superhero films released, such as Ant-Man and the Wasp: Quantumania, Shazam! Fury of the Gods, The Flash, Blue Beetle, The Marvels, and Aquaman and the Lost Kingdom, were moderate commercial failures. Only two superhero films released that year, Guardians of the Galaxy Vol. 3 and Spider-Man: Across the Spider-Verse, performed well at the box office, grossing $845 million and $690 million respectively, turning a profit alongside positive reviews from audiences and critics.

In February 2024, Sony released its fourth film in the Spider-Man Universe, Madame Web. The film was panned by critics and underperformed at the box office. In July, the MCU's first film of the year, Deadpool & Wolverine, was also its first R-rated film. It was Hugh Jackman's first X-Men film since 2017's Logan and Ryan Reynolds' Deadpool's MCU debut. The film was highly acclaimed and grossed over $1.33 billion worldwide, making it the 20th highest-grossing film of all time, the highest-grossing R-rated film of all time, and the second-highest-grossing film of 2024. It was followed by Sony Spider-Man Universe films Venom: The Last Dance in November 2024, and Kraven the Hunter in December 2024. In 2024, Hellboy: The Crooked Man, the second reboot of Guillermo del Toro's Hellboy franchise, was released to negative reviews from critics and was criticized for being worse than the 2019 reboot. In 2024, The Crow, the remake of the 1994 film, was released to negative reviews from critics but was praised for Bill Skarsgard's performance as Eric Draven/the Crow. In February 2025, Captain America: Brave New World was released to moderately poor reviews by critics, and to date has the fourth-lowest box office earnings of any MCU movie. In 2025, The Old Guard 2 was released on Netflix to negative reviews from critics who deemed it inferior to its predesessor. Unlike Captain America: Brave New World, Thunderbolts* received mostly positive reviews, despite an underperformance at the box office. On June 11th, DC Studios released the film Superman to positive reviews from critics, who praised James Gunn's direction and David Corenswet's, Rachel Brosnahan's and Nicholas Hoult's portrayals of Superman, Lois Lane and Lex Luthor respectively. Superman is also the first film set in the DCU, the successor to the DCEU.

==== Economic importance ====
Since the 2010s, superhero films have played a significant role in the film industry. According to The Hollywood Reporter, "With rare exception, even A+ stars aren't making what they used to"—making superhero films "one of the last ways for an actor to earn a major payday." They write that if an actor wants to get paid, they "have to put on a cape" and that characters like Spider-Man and Batman are more important than the actors themselves.

Since 2022, superhero films (especially from the MCU) have seen more inconsistent performances. The Marvels (2023) had the worst nominal box-office outcome amid a broader trend of box-office disappointments for superhero films. Fans, critics, and actors alike have pointed to cultural fatigue and the exhaustion of well-used storylines to explain this sudden dip in earnings and popularity. On the other hand, director Joe Russo has suggested a "generational divide" in media consumption driving declining box office performances.

== Animated ==
Animated superhero films have also achieved critical and financial success. While animated superhero films are typically direct-to-video, a number have been released theatrically.

In 1968, VIP my Brother Superman, a parody of the superhero genre, directed by Italian animator Bruno Bozzetto, was a financial success. Batman: Mask of the Phantasm, which was released theatrically in 1993, was a critical success, though a box-office failure. In 2004, Pixar released The Incredibles, a film about a retired superhero couple and their children. It did well critically and financially, and went on to win an Academy Award. In 2010, DreamWorks Animation released Megamind to middling success. In 2014, Walt Disney Animation Studios released an adaptation of the Marvel superhero team Big Hero 6. The same year, Warner Bros. released The Lego Movie, with Batman and other DC superheroes in leading and supporting roles. As a significant box-office success, it was followed in 2017 by The Lego Batman Movie and DreamWorks Animation's Captain Underpants: The First Epic Movie.

In 2018, three theatrical animated superhero films were released to critical and commercial success: Pixar's Incredibles 2, Warner Bros.' Teen Titans Go! To the Movies, and Sony Pictures Animation's Spider-Man: Into the Spider-Verse. Into the Spider-Verse swept that year's major film awards for animated features, including the Academy Award. A sequel to Spider-Man: Into the Spider-Verse came out in 2023, titled Spider-Man: Across the Spider-Verse. Another Spider-Verse sequel, Spider-Man: Beyond the Spider-Verse, is currently in production and scheduled to be released in 2027.

== Criticism ==
As the number of superhero films being produced increased during the latter part of the 2010s, the genre's contribution to cinema was questioned. In a 2019 interview with Empire magazine, American filmmaker Martin Scorsese commented, "The closest I can think of them, as well-made as they are, with actors doing the best they can under the circumstances, is theme parks. It isn't the cinema of human beings trying to convey emotional, psychological experiences to another human being." He stated the Marvel Cinematic Universe was not "cinema." He later added that he was worried about studios' dependence on the format because in "many places around this country and the world, franchise films are now your primary choice if you want to see something on the big screen. It's a perilous time in film exhibition, and there are fewer independent theaters than ever."

Criticism of Marvel Studios' films continued, with Jennifer Aniston stating that Marvel movies are "diminishing". Denis Villeneuve dismissed "too many Marvel films" as being "a cut and paste of others," and Roland Emmerich stated large blockbuster films such as the MCU and Star Wars movies were "ruining our industry a little" since "nobody does anything original anymore".

Some media commentators have attributed the increasingly popular superhero franchises in the new millennium to the social and political climate in Western society since the September 11 attacks. Others have argued advances in special effects technology have played a more significant role.

Grant Morrison, writer and co-creator of the All-Star Superman comic series, wonders whether the superhero genre can legitimately be classified as a film genre. They reflect that the idea of a superhuman is malleable and has been used in many other genres, like westerns and detective stories. They goes on to explain:

I’m not even sure if there is a superhero genre or if the idea of the superhero is a special chilli pepper-like ingredient designed to energize other genres. The costumed superhero has survived since 1938, constantly shifting in tone from decade to decade to reflect the fears and the needs of the audience. The current mainstream popularity of the superhero has, I think, a lot to do with the fact that the Terror-stricken, environmentally-handicapped, overpopulated, pedophile-haunted world that’s being peddled by our news media is crying out for utopian role models and for any hopeful images of humankind’s future potential!

Writer Alan Moore, a veteran of the comics industry known for his work on Watchmen, V for Vendetta, Batman: The Killing Joke, and From Hell, has expressed criticism of modern superhero movies in general, which he once called a "blight" to cinema and "also to culture to a degree." He said in an October 2022 interview with The Guardian that the popularization of the genre on the part of adults is an "infantilization" that can act as "a precursor to fascism." Lamenting at how deeply such films became part of the culture, Moore commented:

"I will always love and adore the comics medium, but the comics industry and all of the stuff attached to it just became unbearable. ... Hundreds of thousands of adults [are] lining up to see characters and situations that had been created to entertain the 12-year-old boys—and it was always boys—of 50 years ago. I didn't think that superheroes were adult fare. I think that this was a misunderstanding born of what happened in the 1980s—to which I must put my hand up to a considerable share of the blame, though it was not intentional—when things like Watchmen were first appearing. There were an awful lot of headlines saying, 'Comics Have Grown Up'. I tend to think that, no, comics hadn't grown up. There were a few titles that were more adult than people were used to. But the majority of comics titles were pretty much the same as they'd ever been. It wasn't comics growing up. I think it was more comics meeting the emotional age of the audience coming the other way."

In a September 2023 interview with The Telegraph, Moore reiterated this view, saying what had appealed to him most about output from comics publishers was "no more," saying, "now they're called 'graphic novels,' which sounds sophisticated, and you can charge a lot more for them. These innocent and inventive and imaginative superhero characters from the '40s, '50s, and '60s are being recycled to a modern audience as if they were adult fare." During that same interview, journalist Jake Kerridge asked Moore if he divided the money he had received from onscreen adaptations of his work among the writers and other staff members of those productions. Moore replied, "I no longer wish it to even be shared with them. I don't feel, with the recent films, that they have stood by what I assumed were their original principles. So, I asked for DC Comics to send all of the money from any future TV series or films to Black Lives Matter."

At the end of the 2010s and later on in the 2020s, Moore's opinions became more widespread, often pointing out a tendency for superheroes to maintain the status quo. In "Infinity Wars: Post 9/11 Superhero Films and American Empire" Peter J. Bruno argued that "[...] post-9/11 superhero films cannot imagine alternatives outside of empire and its capitalist hegemony." He goes forward, tying superhero movies to an "aesthetic of death" and the process of the dehumanization of the enemy or othering—both typical of fascism according to Umberto Eco's Ur-Fascism—and ties in Achille Mbembe’s concept of necropolitics. Similar fascistic tendencies were noted by other commentators, notably with the spread of the term "Copaganda."

By the 2020s, "superhero fatigue" emerged to describe audience weariness with formulaic superhero films, reflected in declining box-office returns and mixed reviews. In particular, the Marvel Cinematic Universe has been criticized for over-saturating the market with its expansion to streaming beginning with Phase Four, prompting Marvel Studios to rethink its annual output.

== Parody ==
- Andrzej Kondratiuk's 1970 film Hydrozagadka is a parody of the American ideals glorified in superhero films.
- Kinka Usher's 1999 film Mystery Men features a group of inept amateur superheroes.
- Another comedic play on superheroes is The Specials, a 2000 film in which the title team is more concerned with their public image than actually being superheroes.
- Kevin Smith's 2001 film Jay and Silent Bob Strike Back parodies film companies' seemingly compulsive purchase of comic book film rights with "Bluntman and Chronic." In the movie, the character Brodie Bruce (played by Jason Lee) describes the process: "Well, after X-Men hit at the box office, all the studios started buying out every comic property they could get their dirty little hands on."
- Mark Hamill's 2004 parody film Comic Book: The Movie was about a comic book fan and a film adaptation of his favorite character, and was released direct-to-video and achieved mild success, garnering a cult following among comic book readers.
- Craig Mazin directed the more direct parody Superhero Movie, released in 2008.
- 2008's Hancock was a subversion of the genre by having the title character become a reluctant superhero. The movie grossed more than $629 million at the box office.
- Matthew Vaughn directed the 2010 film Kick-Ass, which saw a regular teenager turn to fighting crime. A sequel, Kick-Ass 2, was released in 2013.
- James Gunn directed and wrote the 2010 film Super starring Rainn Wilson.
- Alejandro González Iñárritu's Oscar-winning 2014 film Birdman or (The Unexpected Virtue of Ignorance) satirizes Hollywood's reliance on superhero and blockbuster films. In the film, Michael Keaton portrays Riggan Thomson, a washed-up Hollywood actor known for playing the superhero Birdman in blockbuster movies decades earlier. He is tormented by Birdman's voice, which mocks and criticizes him, and he sees himself performing feats of levitation and telekinesis.
- The 2016 movie Deadpool and its 2018 sequel Deadpool 2 were box-office juggernauts, making $782.6 million and $785.8 million, respectively. Deadpool & Wolverine, which was released in 2024, has grossed approximately $1.3 billion and currently sits on the list of highest-grossing superhero films.
- Philippe Lacheau's 2021 French movie Super-hero's malgré Lui, or Super Who? in English, follows an actor who landed the role of a superhero named "Badman." The actor suffers an accident that causes him amnesia and he starts believing that he is an actual superhero. The movie references DC and Marvel while making fun of the superhero film genre.
- Quentin Dupieux’s 2022 French film Fumer Fait Tousser (Smoking Causes Coughing) follows a team of five superheroes called the Tobacco Force who, following a battle against a diabolical giant turtle that goes wrong, go on a compulsory retreat to strengthen cohesion within their group. Soon, however, an enemy named Lézardin interrupts the retreat to destroy the planet Earth.

== Box office reception ==
According to Box Office Mojo, the ten highest-grossing (as of January 2025) superhero films are:

Top 10 grossing superhero films
| Film | Year | Worldwide gross |
|---|---|---|
| Avengers: Endgame | 2019 | $2,799,439,100 |
| Avengers: Infinity War | 2018 | $2,048,359,754 |
| Spider-Man: No Way Home | 2021 | $1,926,899,310 |
| The Avengers | 2012 | $1,518,812,988 |
| Avengers: Age of Ultron | 2015 | $1,402,809,540 |
| Black Panther | 2018 | $1,346,913,171 |
| Deadpool & Wolverine | 2024 | $1,338,073,645 |
| Incredibles 2 | 2018 | $1,242,805,359 |
| Iron Man 3 | 2013 | $1,215,577, 205 |
| Captain America: Civil War | 2016 | $1,153,304,495 |

The Marvel Cinematic Universe (MCU) has earned over $31 billion and is one of the largest film franchises in history, surpassing Star Wars by over $7 billion. Its highest-grossing film, Avengers: Endgame (2019), briefly held the record for the highest-grossing film of all time before being surpassed by a record-breaking re-release of Avatar (2009) in 2021. Deadpool & Wolverine is also the highest grossing R-rated film, both in the US/Canada and worldwide.

== See also ==
- List of American superhero films
- List of films based on comics
- List of television series and films based on Dark Horse Comics publications
- List of films based on DC Comics publications
- List of films based on Image Comics
- List of films based on Marvel Comics publications
- Superhero fiction

== Bibliography ==
- Lichtenfeld, Eric (2007). Action Speaks Louder: Violence, Spectacle, and the American Action. Wesleyan University Press. ISBN 978-0-8195-6801-4.
- The Staff and Friends of Scarecrow (2003). The Scarecrow Video Movie Guide. Sasquatch Books. ISBN 1-57061-415-6.
- Graeber, David (2012). Super Position (Essay). The New Inquiry.*Graeber, David (October 8, 2012). "Super Position". The New Inquiry.
- "All Time Worldwide Box Office for Super Hero Movies". The Numbers.
