= Pevita Pearce =

British and Indonesian actress and singer (born 1992)

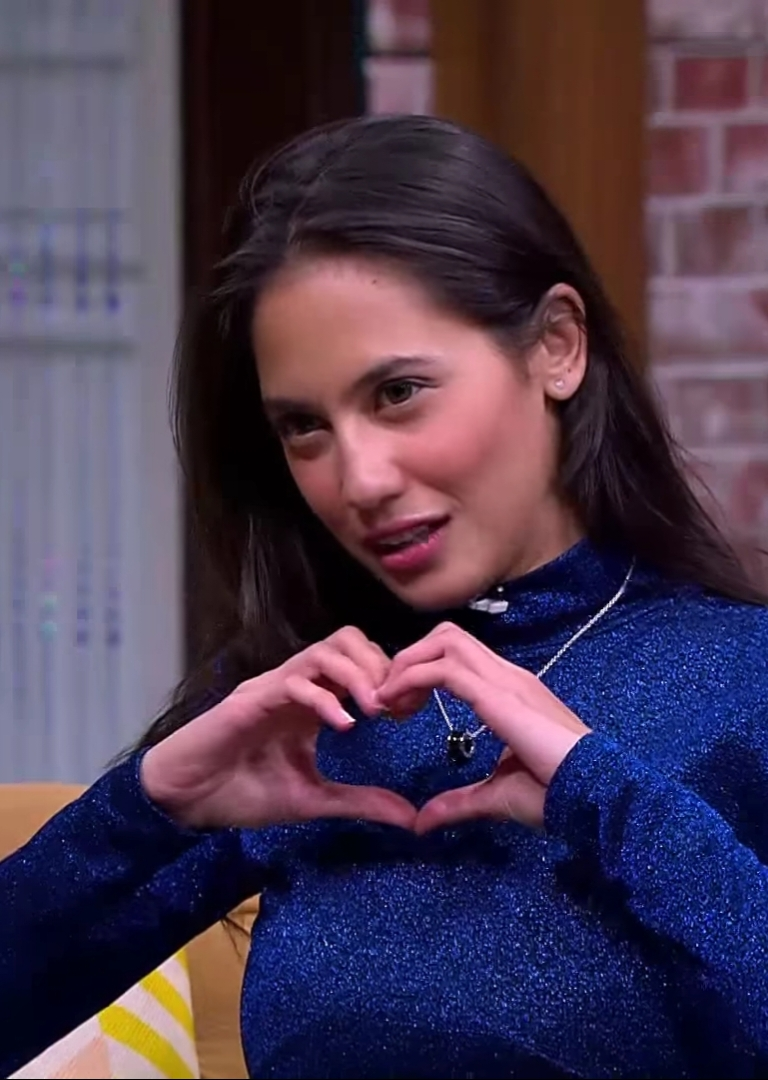
- Pearce in 2018
- Born: Pevita Cleo Eileen Pearce; October 6, 1992 (age 34); Jakarta, Indonesia
- Citizenship: UK
- Occupations: Celebrity, Model
- Years active: 2006 - present
- Spouse: Mirzan Meer (m. 2024)

Pevita Cleo Eileen Pearce (born 6 October 1992) is a British-Indonesian actress and model of mixed Welsh and Banjar descent.

== Early life ==
Pevita Pearce was born on 6 October 1992 in Jakarta, Indonesia, as the middle child of three children born to Bramwell Pearce of the United Kingdom, and his first wife, Ernie Auliasari from Banjarmasin. She has a brother, Keenan Pearce, and a half-sister, Chelsea Pearce. After completing her junior school education, she went to SMP Al-Azhar 9 in Kemang Pratama, Bekasi, and moved to SMA Al-Azhar. Then, she moved to SMA HighScope and graduated from there, and continued her education at New York Film Academy in 2011, and at La Salle College International Jakarta from 2012 until 2014.

== Career ==
Pearce first gained recognition for her role as Angel in the 2006 film Denias, Senandung di Atas Awan. In the same year, she appeared in the second season of the television series Mutiara Hati, playing the role of Tara.

In 2008, Pearce starred as Tita in the film Lost in Love. She secured the role after a rigorous selection process, competing against 1,100 applicants before being chosen from the final eight candidates. For her performance in the film, she was nominated for the Citra Award for Best Actress at the 2008 Indonesian Film Festival.

== Personal life ==
=== Relationships ===
Pearce was in a relationship with singer Anindyo Baskoro from 2010 until 2012. She had also been romantically linked to racing driver Moreno Soeprapto, actor Banyu Biru, businessman Indra Priawan Djokosoetono and model Mike Lewis. She got married in 2024 to Malaysian businessman Mirzan Meer.

=== Illness ===
In 2014, Pearce was diagnosed with a breast tumor, which she had removed in Malaysia in April of that year.

== Filmography ==
=== Films ===
Year	Title	Role	Notes
2006	Denias, Senandung di Atas Awan	Angel	Film debut
2008	Lost in Love	Tita	Lead role Nominated - 2008 Indonesian Film Festival for Best Actress
2009	Rasa	Rianti	Lead role
2012	Dilema	Dian	Segment: "Rendezvous"
2012	5 cm	Dinda	Lead role
2012	Sanubari Jakarta	Anna	Segment: "1/2"
2013	Tenggelamnya Kapal Van Der Wijck	Hayati	Lead role
2014	Aku Cinta Kamu	Lisa	Segment: "Sakit Hati"
2015	Single	Laras	Special appearances
2016	Aach... Aku Jatuh Cinta	Yulia	Lead role
2017	The Guys	Amira	komedi
2018	May the Devil Take You	Maya Wijiya	
2019	Gundala	Alana / Sri Asih	Cameo
2022	Sri Asih	Alana / Sri Asih	Lead Role
	Patriot	Alana / Sri Asih	Lead Role

=== Television ===
Year	Title	Role	Notes	Broadcast
2010	2010 Indonesian Movie Awards	Herself	Host	RCTI
2015 - 2016	Stereo	Herself	Host	NET. Entertainment
2015 - 2019	The East (TV series)	Herself	Standup comedian	NET. Entertainment

=== Music videos ===
2007

- Kesempatan Kedua (Tangga)

2009

- Cinta Sampai di Sini (single, D'Masiv)

2010

- Cemburu Menguras Hati (single, Vidi Aldiano)

2011

- Sakit Hati (Piyu single)

2012

- Bunga Terakhir (Afgan single)
- Hidup Untukmu Mati Tanpamu (Noah single)

== Awards and nomination ==
Years	Awards	Nominations	Result
2008	Festival Film Indonesia	Best Actress - Lost In Love	Nominated
2012	Indonesian Movie Awards	Best Couple	Nominated
2013	Festival Film Bandung	Best Supporting Actress - "5cm"	Nominated
2013	Yahoo OMG! Awards	Most Stylish Female	Won
2014	Festival Film Bandung	Best Actress - "Tenggelamnya Kapal Van Der Wijck"	Won
2014	Indonesian Choice Awards	Actress Of The Year	Won
2014	Nickelodeon Indonesia Kids' Choice Awards	Favourite Actress	Won
2016	Festival Film Bandung	Best Actress - "Aach.. Aku Jatuh Cinta"	Nominated
2018	Festival Film Bandung	Best Actress - "Sebelum Iblis Menjemput"	Nominated
2018	Piala Maya Arifin C Noer Award	Most Memorable Short Appearance	Nominated
2023	Festival Film Bandung	Best Actress Web Series	Nominated
