= R. A. Kosasih =

Indonesian comics author (1919–2012)

- Born: Raden Ahmad Kosasih; April 4, 1919 Bogor, West Java, Dutch East Indies
- Died: July 24, 2012 (aged 93) Tangerang, Banten, Indonesia
- Areas: Writer, Penciller, Artist, Inker, Letterer
- Notable works: Sri Asih; Siti Gahara Mahabarata Ramayana

Raden Ahmad Kosasih (April 4, 1919-July 24, 2012) was an Indonesian comics author.

== Biography ==
Raden Kosasih was born in Bogor, Indonesia, at April 4, 1919. At the start of his career, he worked as a book illustrator.

Kosasih published his first comics, a five-part comic book series featuring the female superheroes Sri Asih and Siti Gahara, in 1954. It was the first popular indigenous comic book in Indonesia.

Kosasih started from the wayang (Indonesian puppet theatre) stories, traditions and techniques and applied these to comics. His major works were his adaptations of the ancient Indian epics Mahabharata between 1957 and 1959 (the main series in 37 volumes, and many other comics about characters from the epic) and the Ramayana. Other comics by Kosasih include Wayang Purwa and Sri Kresna (four volumes, 1983). His Mahabharata diverged from the typical wayang Indonesian elements in the stories and turned back to the original Indian versions. Its popularity lead to a renewed interest in the wayang versions as well, and many wayang puppeteers incorporated elements from the comics into their stories.

Kosasih continued to write and draw comics until 1993, when Parkinson's disease made it impossible to continue. At the time of his death in 2012 he lived in Ciputat.

== Partial bibliography ==
- Sri Asih
- Cempaka
- Seri Mahabharata
- Ramayana
- Lahirnya Rahwana
- Wayang Purwa
- Prabu Udrayana
- Arjuna Sasrabahu
- Panji Semirang
- Sangkuriang
- Parikesit
- Lutung Kasarung
- Rara Inten
- Leluhur Hastina
- Bharata Yudha
- Pandhawa Seda
- Setan Cebol
- Dadali Putih
- Siti Gahara
- Kala Hitam
- Kujang Emas
