= Gangs of London (video game) =

2006 video game

- European cover art
- Developer: London Studio
- Publisher: Sony Computer Entertainment
- Platform: PlayStation Portable
- Release: EU: 1 September 2006; AU: 7 September 2006; NA: 3 October 2006
- Genre: Action-adventure
- Mode: Single-player

Gangs of London is a 2006 action-adventure video game developed by London Studio and published by Sony Computer Entertainment for the PlayStation Portable. It is the third installment in the Getaway series, following The Getaway (2002) and Black Monday (2004). The player has the choice to play as one of five different gangs within London, with different ethnicities and outfits.

Gareth Evans and Matt Flannery created a television adaptation of the game starring Joe Cole, Sope Dirisu, and an ensemble cast, which debuted on Sky Atlantic and AMC in April 2020, from which a spin-off graphic novel, Ghosts, was released in December 2022, written by Corin Hardy and Rowan Athale and illustrated by Ferenc Nothof.

== Gameplay ==
During the course of Gang of London's story mode, the player is given a wide variety of objectives. One objective may require entering a nightclub armed with a jackhammer, while another may involve trying to run the enemy off the road, or them trying to run the player off the road. There are also kidnapping missions, stealth missions, and race missions. Once the story mode is complete, a cliffhanger ending ensues. Outside of missions, the player can free roam the game's environment and complete minigames such as taking photos of London landmarks or running over pedestrians. The game also has "bar" style mini-games, accessed from a pub. The four pub games are darts, skittles, pool, and an arcade game similar to Snake.

== Premise ==
At his country estate, Morris Kane, a veteran cockney gangster and leader of his own firm, breeds pigeons in preparation for an upcoming competition. The next morning, Kane is horrified to find out that all the pigeons have been slaughtered. He soon vows to take over the city as an act of revenge. In Westminster, Russian crime lord Vladislav Zakharov is planning to purchase a Fabergé egg to add to his collection. Returning home, Zakharov finds that his mansion is torched. Enraged by the loss of his collection, Zakharov vows to make the city suffer.

Mason Grant, leader of the Jamaican yardie gang EC2 Crew, is out on a date with his girlfriend Chantel. She is later assassinated by an unseen sniper while at a cafe with Grant. He vows to hold those responsible for her death. Inside a gambling den, two Water Dragon Triads are intimidated by another who will do whatever it takes to win a game of Mahjong. During the game, a bomb goes off; killing the Triads. Triad leader San Chu Yang declares war on the other gangs. Elsewhere, Pakistani gangster Asif Rashid, who leads the Talwar Brothers, learns that his brother has been set up and arrested by armed police. Determined to bail his brother out, Rashid assembles his gang to take over London.

== Reception ==
Reception

Aggregate score
Aggregator	Score
Metacritic	52/100

Review scores
Publication	Score
Edge	3/10
Electronic Gaming Monthly	2.83/10
Eurogamer	5/10
Game Informer	6/10
GamePro	3.5/5
GameRevolution	C−
GameSpot	5.5/10
GameSpy	3.5/5
GameTrailers	5.3/10
GameZone	5/10
IGN	(UK) 5.2/10 (US) 4.5/10
Official U.S. PlayStation Magazine	4/10
The Sydney Morning Herald	3/5

Gangs of London received "mixed or average" reviews, according to video game review aggregator Metacritic.

== Adaptations ==
=== Television series ===
Gareth Evans and Matt Flannery created a television adaptation of the game starring Joe Cole, Sope Dirisu, and an ensemble cast, which debuted on Sky Atlantic and AMC in April 2020, with Dirisu portraying Elliot Carter / Finch, a character loosely based on Frank Carter, and Colm Meaney portraying Finn Wallace, a character loosely based on Andy Steele.

In an interview with Sky News in April 2020, Evans stated that while initially hired to "make a film franchise" of Gangs of London, he had felt like if we were going to do a film franchise, we would have two-thirds of our running time focused purely on our central characters, and then only a third left to explore the side characters that populate that world", and so on deciding that "we wouldn't do justice to the myriad of different diverse cultures and ethnicities that make up the city [I then] pitched it back saying this should be a TV show because you can afford to go off and detour for 10 to 15 minutes and spend time with other characters, and learn about them in more detail."

=== Graphic novel ===
In December 2022, a Gangs of London graphic novel, set between the first and second series of the television adaptation and titled A Gangs of London Story: Ghosts, written by Corin Hardy and Rowan Athale and illustrated by Ferenc Nothof, was released digitally to the news aggregator Den of Geek, ahead of a physical release.
