= Gangs of London (TV series) =

2020 British television series

- Genre: Action thriller; Crime drama
- Created by: Gareth Evans; Matt Flannery
- Based on: Gangs of London by London Studio (Note: Gangs of London was developed by London Studio and published by Sony Computer Entertainment as a spin-off of The Getaway, written by Brendan McNamara and Katie Ellwood, and Black Monday, written/designed by Chun Wah Kong. Mike Bambury was the writer, Naresh Hirani was the creative director, and Daniel Navarro was the game director.)
- Starring: Joe Cole; Colm Meaney; Lucian Msamati; Sope Dirisu; Michelle Fairley; Brian Vernel; Valene Kane; Paapa Essiedu; Pippa Bennett-Warner; Asif Raza Mir; Orli Shuka; Narges Rashidi; Mark Lewis Jones; Ray Panthaki; Jing Lusi; Waleed Zuaiter; Jahz Armando; Fady Elsayed; Salem Kali; Aymen Hamdouchi; Andrew Koji; Richard Dormer; T'Nia Miller
- Composers: Aria Prayogi; Fajar Yuskemal
- Country of origin: United Kingdom
- Original language: English
- No. of series: 3
- No. of episodes: 25

Production
- Executive producers: Thomas Benski; Lucas Ochoa; Jane Featherstone; Gareth Evans; Matt Flannery; Gabriel Silver; Tom Butterworth; Corin Hardy; Helen Gregory; Peter McKenna; Michael Eagle-Hodgeson; Vikki Tennant; Jamie Hall; Kim Hong Sun; Sope Dirisu
- Producers: Hugh Warren; Charlotte Surtees
- Cinematography: Matt Flannery; Martijn van Broekhuizen; Laurent Barès
- Running time: 42–93 minutes
- Production companies: Pulse Films; Sister Pictures; One More One; FendoUK; Sky Studios

Original release
- Network: Sky Atlantic (United Kingdom); AMC+ (United States)
- Release: 23 April 2020 – present

Related
- The Getaway franchise

Gangs of London is a British action crime drama television series created by Gareth Evans and Matt Flannery. Based on London Studio's video game of the same name, it serves as a spinoff of The Getaway franchise.

The first series premiered on 23 April 2020 on Sky Atlantic. In June 2020, it was renewed for a second series, with AMC taking over American broadcast rights and co-producing, and Corin Hardy taking over as showrunner. The second series premiered on 20 October 2022 in the UK and on 17 November 2022 in the US. In November 2022, it was renewed for a third series that premiered on 20 March 2025 in the UK. In August 2025, it was renewed for a fourth series.

The series has received generally positive reviews from critics, who praised its performances, narrative, and action sequences, though some criticism was aimed at its excessive violence.

== Premise ==
The series follows the power struggles of the rival gangs and criminal organisations in London. As one of the world's most dynamic and multicultural cities, London's criminal underworld is thrown into disarray following the assassination of the head of the city's most powerful crime family.

For twenty years, Finn Wallace (Colm Meaney) was the most powerful criminal in London until his death, with billions of pounds flowing through the Wallace Organisation each year. His son Sean Wallace (Joe Cole), with the help of his mother, Marian Wallace (Michelle Fairley), and Finn's right-hand man Ed Dumani (Lucian Msamati), attempts to continue his legacy. Finn's assassination causes ripples across the world of international crime, affecting the Albanian mafia, Kurdish PKK, and the Pakistani drug cartel, among various other criminal elements. Newcomer Elliot Carter (Sope Dirisu), an undercover police officer, is tasked with infiltrating the Wallace Organisation to expose them in their moment of weakness.

== Cast and characters ==
=== Overview ===
Actor	Character	Series			
Actor	Character	1	2	3	4
Main characters
Joe Cole	Sean Wallace	Main	Main	Main	
Colm Meaney	Finn Wallace	Main			
Lucian Msamati	Edward "Ed" Dumani	Main	Main	Main	
Sope Dirisu	Elliot Carter	Main	Main	Main	Main
Michelle Fairley	Marian Wallace	Main	Main	Main	Main
Brian Vernel	Billy Wallace	Main	Main	Main	Main
Valene Kane	Jacqueline Robinson	Main	Main		Main
Paapa Essiedu	Alexander "Alex" Dumani	Main	Main		
Pippa Bennett-Warner	Shannon Dumani	Main	Main	Main	Main
Asif Raza Mir	Asif Afridi	Main	Main	Main	
Orli Shuka	Luan Dushaj	Main	Main	Main	Main
Narges Rashidi	Lale	Main	Main	Main	Main
Mark Lewis Jones	Kinney Edwards	Main			
Ray Panthaki	Jevan Kapadia	Main			
Jing Lusi	Victoria "Vicky" Chung	Main			
Waleed Zuaiter	Koba		Main		
Jahz Armando	Saba Soudani		Main	Main	
Fady Elsayed	Faz Soudani		Main	Main	
Salem Kali	Basem Soudani		Main		
Aymen Hamdouchi	Hakim Soudani		Main		
Andrew Koji	Zeek Kimura			Main	Main
Richard Dormer	Cornelius Quinn			Main	
T'Nia Miller	Simone Thearle			Main	Main
Tamara Lawrance	Jo Malik				Main
Luna Fujimoto	Hanaka				Main
Eugene Nomura	Takeshi Kimura				Main
Melika Foroutan	Zerin				Main

=== Main ===
- Joe Cole as Sean Wallace (series 1–3), the younger son of Finn and Marian Wallace, who fights for leadership of his family's criminal empire after his father's death.
  - Thomas Simpson portrays Sean as a teenager during flashbacks.
- Colm Meaney as Finn Wallace (series 1), the late patriarch of the Wallace family and leader of a criminal empire whose murder throws the London underworld into chaos.
- Lucian Msamati as Edward "Ed" Dumani (series 1–3), the patriarch of the Dumani family and Finn's longtime right-hand man.
  - Jevan Onasanya portrays Ed as a teenager during flashbacks.
- Sope Dirisu as Elliot Carter, an undercover police officer who infiltrates the Wallace Organisation and begins a relationship with Shannon Dumani. Introduced as "Elliot Finch", in the first-season finale, Elliot's real surname is revealed to be "Carter", with the character based on The Getaway video game character Frank Carter, by which surname he is known for the rest of the series.
  - Ejiro Ndi-Efam portrays Elliot as a child during flashbacks.
- Michelle Fairley as Marian Wallace, the ruthless matriarch of the Wallace family.
- Brian Vernel as Billy Wallace, the older son of Finn and Marian who suffers from substance abuse.
  - Pete MacHale portrays Billy as a teenager during flashbacks.
- Valene Kane as Jacqueline Robinson (series 1–2, 4), the daughter of Finn and Marian and a doctor who is estranged from her family for the safety of her unborn child.
- Paapa Essiedu as Alexander "Alex" Dumani (series 1–2), the son of Ed Dumani and a close associate of Sean, who many in the Wallace Organisation believe should inherit Finn's criminal empire.
- Pippa Bennett-Warner as Shannon Dumani, the daughter of Ed Dumani, who begins a relationship with Elliot.
- Asif Raza Mir as Asif Afridi (series 1–3), the influential kingpin of the Pakistani drug cartel.
- Orli Shuka as Luan Dushaj, the leader of the Albanian mafia in London, who is brought into the Wallace family's disputes when Finn Wallace is murdered on his territory.
- Narges Rashidi as Lale, the leader of the Kurdish PKK in London who oversees a heroin distribution ring whilst seeking revenge against Asif.
- Mark Lewis Jones as Kinney Edwards (series 1), the leader of a group of Welsh travellers who become involved in the murder of Finn Wallace.
- Ray Panthaki as Jevan Kapadia (series 1), the point of contact for the mysterious Investors who wish to tip the scales of the future of London's criminal underworld.
- Jing Lusi as Victoria "Vicky" Chung (series 1), a detective inspector in the London Metropolitan Police and Elliot's handler.
- Waleed Zuaiter as Koba (series 2), the ruthless leader of the Georgian mafia and an international arms dealer who is brought to London by the Investors to bring order to the city.
- Jahz Armando as Saba Soudani (series 2–3), Basem's niece who works at a cafe that acts as a front for the Algerian mafia.
- Fady Elsayed as Faz Soudani (series 2–3), Basem's younger nephew and a member of the Algerian mafia who becomes traumatised after a run-in with Koba.
- Salem Kali as Basem Soudani (series 2), the leader of the Algerian mafia in London who wants to free his gang from the Investors' control.
- Aymen Hamdouchi as Hakim Soudani (series 2), Basem's older nephew and right-hand man in the Algerian mafia.
- Andrew Koji as Zeek Kimura (series 3–present), a mysterious and highly skilled assassin who is secretly Finn's illegitimate son.
- Richard Dormer as Cornelius Quinn (series 3), Marian's brother and the leader of an Irish gang.
- T'Nia Miller as Simone Thearle (series 3–present), the mayor of London who targets organised crime in the city by starting a war on drugs.
- Tamara Lawrance as Jo Malik (series 4)
- Luna Fujimoto as Hanaka (series 4)
- Eugene Nomura as Takeshi Kimura (series 4)
- Melika Foroutan as Zerin (series 4)

=== Recurring ===
- Parth Thakerar as Nasir Afridi (series 1), Asif Afridi's son and a candidate for mayor of London.
- Taye Matthew as Danny Dumani, Shannon's young son.
- Aksel Ustun as Hekar (series 1), Lale's right-hand man in the PKK.
- Adrian Bower as Mark (series 1), the chief enforcer for the Wallace Organisation.
- Jude Akuwudike as Charlie Carter (series 1–2), Elliot's father and a retired boxer.
  - Adam J. Bernard portrays a younger Charlie during flashbacks.
- Nebli Basani as Tariq Gjelaj (series 1), Luan's right-hand man in the Albanian mafia.
- Garry Cooper as John Hawks (series 1), a detective chief inspector in the London Metropolitan Police and Vicky's colleague.
- Pamela Nomvete as Serwa (series 1; guest series 2), a private investigator hired by Marian.
- Richard Pepple as Uche "Mosi" Mossanya (series 1), the leader of the Nigerian mafia.
- Mads Koudal as Leif Hansen (series 1), a Danish assassin and the leader of a mercenary unit that the Investors hire to kill various targets.
- Arta Dobroshi as Floriana (series 1; guest series 2), Finn's Albanian mistress who is carrying his unborn child.
- David Avery as Anthony (series 1), a police officer who infiltrates the Wallace Organisation.
- Sharon Morgan as Ingrid Hansen (series 1), Leif's elderly mother.
- Eri Shuka as Mirlinda Dushaj, Luan's wife and the mother of his young daughters.
- Amanda Drew as Miss Kane (series 2; guest series 1, 3), one of the Investors and Jevan Kapadia's enigmatic superior. In the third season, Kane only appears during flashbacks.
- Cornell John as Joseph Singer (series 2; guest series 1), a mysterious and powerful figure who has spent years attempting to take down the Investors.
- Rom Blanco as Tamaz (series 2), Koba's right-hand man in the Georgian mafia.
- Andi Jashy as Afrim (series 2), a high-ranking enforcer for the Albanian mafia.
- Murat Erkek as Merwan (series 2–3), the new second-in-command and public face of the PKK in London.
- Sebastian Armesto as Henry Amiel (series 3), one of the Investors and a government official who advises Simone.
- Tim McDonnell as Liam (series 3), Marian's chief enforcer and bodyguard.
- Nikolaos Brahimllari as Artan (series 3), a lieutenant in the Albanian mafia.

=== Guest ===
- Emmett J. Scanlan as Jack O'Doherty (series 1, 3), Finn's personal driver and bodyguard. In the third season, Jack only appears during flashbacks.
- Richard Harrington as Mal (series 1), a Welsh traveller and Kinney's right-hand man.
- Aled ap Steffan as Darren Edwards (series 1), Kinney Edward's son, who is unknowingly hired to murder Finn Wallace.
- Darren Evans as Ioan (series 1), Darren's friend and an accomplice in Finn Wallace's murder.
- David Bradley as Jim (series 1, 3), a retired enforcer for the Wallace Organisation and Elliot's former boss.
- Kwong Loke as Wong (series 1), the leader of the Chinese Triads in London.
- Lobo Chan as Jin Li (series 1), a well-connected Chinese gangster working with Luan.
- Gordon Alexander as Cole (series 1), a sadistic hitman hired by Sean.
- Laura Bach as Tove Fransen (series 1), Leif's partner and the second-in-command of his mercenary unit.
- Azra Rexhepi as Elira Dushaj (series 1–3), Luan and Murlinda's elder daughter.
- Chloe Sulaj as Bukoroshe Dushaj, Luan and Murlinda's younger daughter.
- Caroline Lee-Johnson as Evie (series 1), a weapons manufacturer working with the Welsh travellers who employs teenage orphans as her staff.
- Frances Tomelty as Niamh Quinn (series 1), Marian's older sister and the head of an Irish crime family.
- Tim McInnerny as Mr Jacobs (series 1), Kane's partner and one of the Investors.
- Zydrunas Savickas as Abdullah Shafak (series 2), the leader of the Turkish mafia in London.
- Ronan Raftery as Darragh (series 2), a younger Irish mercenary working for Marian.
- Louis Dempsey as Killian (series 2), an older Irish mercenary working for Marian.
- Tamar Baruch as Bibi Agostini (series 2), the French drug queenpin of Paris.
- Evelyn Miller as Naomi Keegan (series 3), Elliot's deceased wife who appears during flashbacks.
- Phil Daniels as Ronnie Devereux (series 3), Deborah's husband and a retired sanitation worker.
- Ruth Sheen as Deborah Devereux (series 3), Ronnie's wife and a bartender who owed a debt to Finn Wallace for helping her son.
- Ali Azhar as Ali (series 3), a drug addict who falsely claims a bounty placed by Luan.
- George Somner as Moe (series 3), a drug addict and Ali's friend.
- Rina Mahoney as Ayesha (series 3), a Pakistani doula working for Asif.
- Mat Fraser as Ray (series 3), a pawnbroker who sells guns on the side.
- Akiko Hitomi as Emi Kimura (series 3), Zeek's ageing mother and Finn's former lover.
- Janet McTeer as Isabel Vaughn (series 3), one of the Investors and the leader of an international drug manufacturing organisation.

== Episodes ==
Series	Episodes	Originally released
1	9	23 April 2020
2	8	20 October 2022
3	8	20 March 2025

=== Series 1 (2020) ===
No. overall	No. in series	Title	Directed by	Written by	Original release date
1	1	"Episode 1"	Gareth Evans	Gareth Evans and Matt Flannery	23 April 2020
Finn Wallace, patriarch of the Wallace crime syndicate, is murdered by a young Welsh Traveller named Darren, who was oblivious to his target's identity. With support from Finn's widow Marian, his son Sean takes over the syndicate, shutting down all business to other criminal enterprises in the city until his father's killer is identified. Finn's adviser Ed Dumani, whose son Alex is lifelong friends with Sean, advises against this but Sean proceeds. Suspicion immediately falls on Albanian gang boss Luan, who was absent from Finn's wake. Elliot, a low-ranking member of the Wallace organisation, learns that Luan has Finn's missing driver Jack captive. Revealing himself a highly skilled combatant, Elliot recovers Jack from Luan's hideout, earning favour with Sean. Darren's estranged father Kinney, a leader among the local Travellers, finds out and tracks Darren down to his hideout, recovering him while having Darren's friend and getaway driver tortured to death. Kinney sends Darren away with his Traveller connections. Elliot, a police spy, receives intel on Darren's hideout from his handler, Vicky Chung. Elliot kills Kinney's men, but Darren is already gone, and the remaining captive kills himself before Elliot can question him. Ed Dumani murders Jack to keep the late Finn's secrets.
2	2	"Episode 2"	Corin Hardy	Claire Wilson	23 April 2020
Flashbacks reveal that Finn took a young Sean out to the woods to commit his first murder. When Sean was unable to, his older brother, Billy, killed the man instead. In the present day, Billy is the black sheep, a gay recovering heroin addict who is kept out of the business. While at an orgy in a hotel room, Billy sees an acquaintance shooting heroin, and demands to know where he got it. Lale, the Kurdish leader, finds a new international source for heroin, stealing it from her Pakistani rival Asif's overseas business, then having it shipped to London. Asif, whose son Nasir is standing for mayor, requests that Sean reopen trade with him exclusively during his shutdown, but Sean refuses. Elliot is assigned to drive Ed Dumani's daughter Shannon, and the two share an immediate spark. Luan meets with Ed and provides him with photos of a secret Finn had kept even from Ed and his family. Kinney approaches Sean, requesting mercy for his son, but Sean refuses. Billy goes missing and Sean tracks him down with help from Elliot, revealing that rather than scoring heroin, Billy was able to identify the dealer as the Kurds, revealing Lale's business despite the shutdown. Sean chastises Billy for doing something so dangerous. Later, Sean leads an attack on Kinney's Traveller encampment, killing dozens, but Kinney escapes.
3	3	"Episode 3"	Corin Hardy	Peter Berry	23 April 2020
A flashback to Turkey reveals that Lale's husband Ara was burned alive because he was sold out to the Turkish forces by Asif, with Lale swearing revenge. In the present, Lale arranges to ship supplies back to her allies there. Marian learns through Serwa, her private investigator, that Finn was having an affair with a woman named Floriana and spent millions on a yacht in her name. Vicky speaks to the neighbour of the apartment where Finn was killed, learning that Floriana lived there. Luan agrees to launder money through the Wallace business for a dangerous Nigerian crime lord named Mosi. Elliot grows closer to Shannon and her son Danny, kissing Shannon but hesitating to sleep with her. Alex holds a conference as the new face of Finn's legitimate business, impressing investor Jevan Kapadia. Sean and Ed plan separately to deal with Lale's breach of the shutdown. Sean hires a sadistic mercenary named Cole to abduct Lale's sister and her family, blackmailing her into halting her shipment to Turkey. Oblivious to this, Ed takes Elliot to Lale's business front, finding the aftermath of Cole's massacre and kidnapping. Elliot, who was hired to drive Cole, identifies where to locate him and Lale's sister. Elliot attempts to rescue the family, only to be nearly killed in a protracted fight with Cole, who is shot dead at the last minute by Ed. Meanwhile, Sean ambushes Lale's shipment and destroys it, revealing that she is now the only London gang leader he knows not to be his father's killer.
4	4	"Episode 4"	Corin Hardy	Peter Berry and Joe Murtagh	23 April 2020
Fearing the Wallaces and Dumanis are growing distant, Sean plans a dinner for the two families, even convincing his sister Jacqueline, a doctor with no criminal affiliations, to join. Sean also goes into business with Lale, but Asif learns about this arrangement. Ed shows Luan's photos to Alex, revealing them to be an entire Albanian family that was slaughtered with Finn's involvement. Vicky receives a text telling her to stop investigating Floriana, along with footage of someone entering Vicky's apartment at night and touching her sleeping face with a box cutter. A pregnant Floriana is shown captive in the basement of a Danish man named Leif and his mother. In an intimate moment, Elliot reveals to Shannon that his wife and son were killed in a car accident. Ed shows up at Elliot's home later, suspicious of his loyalties, and assigns him to help Wallace lieutenant Mark track down some petty thieves who robbed a jewellery store under their protection. When Elliot refuses to torture the thieves, Mark identifies him as an undercover cop, witnessed by Anthony, one of the robbers. Ed and Alex attend a party with Wallace Corp's investors, where Jevan insinuates that they now see Alex as the proper heir to the business, not Sean. Sean meets with Luan about the photographs, and Luan begins to explain that Finn hired him to kill the Albanian family. The meeting is interrupted when Leif attempts to assassinate Sean with a sniper rifle from a nearby rooftop. Leif picks off many of Sean's men, including Mark, keeping Elliot's identity safe. Elliot takes a bullet saving Sean's life, and Sean takes a critically wounded Elliot back to his house, interrupting the dinner so Jacqueline can treat his wounds. A house waitress suddenly pulls a gun on Sean, but is shot by Alex, leaving both families in disarray.
5	5	"Episode 5"	Gareth Evans	Gareth Evans and Matt Flannery	23 April 2020
Darren is taken by Kinney's contact Mal to a farmhouse far out in the country owned by their acquaintance Evie, a weapons manufacturer who adopts orphaned teenagers. Arrangements are made for Darren to leave the country by boat with Evie's husband, Albert. Meanwhile, in the aftermath of the massacre at the Traveller encampment, a wounded Kinney hides out in the surrounding woods. Leif arrives at the campsite to collect intel, accompanied by Tove, the "waitress" who shot at Sean, revealed to be a Danish mercenary as well. Leif discovers Kinney's phone under a trailer and can ascertain Darren's location based on a text exchange. Kinney evades the mercenaries and begins the arduous journey to reach Darren on foot, eventually stealing a man's truck and shotgun along the way. Kinney and the Danes converge on Evie's compound, where a prolonged siege takes place. Mal, Evie and all of her adopted teenagers are killed. Kinney and a resentful Darren retreat through an underground tunnel, but Leif catches up to them, shooting them along with Albert just as they are about to reach his boat. Kinney clings to his son, delivering a final, delirious monologue about perseverance, before Leif executes them both. As Leif calls his contact to confirm Darren's death, it is revealed that the Danes are working for Jevan Kapadia.
6	6	"Episode 6"	Xavier Gens	Lauren Sequeira	23 April 2020
Ed identifies Jevan as the culprit in the dinner shooting. Jevan leverages Alex's life to convince Ed to keep the information secret. Ed continues managing the family business, fulfilling Finn's deal with Luan to help launder his and Mosi's money. Eventually, Ed reveals to Alex that Finn was killed by his own investors, who now want to eliminate Sean and install Alex as the new head of the organisation. Meanwhile Sean, Marian and Billy hide out at a safe house, where Tove is revealed to have survived her gunshot wound, with Marian holding her captive and brutally torturing her for information. Sean attempts to dissuade Marian and reason with Tove, who still refuses to talk. Billy struggles with his addictive urges under stress. Sean invites Elliot to the safe house, whom he trusts for saving his life. The two locate Tove's house using a tracking chip on her dog, identifying her as former Danish Special Forces and briefly encountering her young son. Billy invites Alex to the safe house in exchange for heroin, and Alex is shocked to discover Tove still alive, as he had been led to believe he killed her. Now disillusioned with Sean, Alex joins Ed at a meeting with Jevan. At the safehouse, a relapsed Billy wanders into the torture room, where Tove escapes her binds and takes him hostage, not before revealing the crucial detail that her team was meant to attack only when the Dumanis were absent. Marian shoots Tove dead, risking Billy's life. Sean confronts Alex about the information Tove provided, but their confrontation is interrupted when Alex realises 500 million pounds – including Luan's and Mosi's money – has disappeared from their company bank account.
7	7	"Episode 7"	Xavier Gens	Peter Berry	23 April 2020
Asif sends men to massacres Lale's entire organisation. Lale herself escapes. She makes contact with Sean, and the two form a secret allegiance. Elliot tips off Vicky about Tove and Leif, but Leif and his mother remove Floriana from their property before the raid, which uncovers nothing. Vicky's superior, DCI Harks, indicates that Elliot is untrustworthy and initiates the process of pulling him from his undercover position, focusing instead on Anthony, the jewellery robber, another undercover cop now rising in the ranks. With his money still missing, Mosi arrives in London looking for answers. He and his men slaughter the employees at the investment bank where it was being laundered, then visit Luan's home during his daughter's birthday and threaten him. Luan, in turn, threatens Ed, believing he stole the money from the account. Alex identifies the withdrawals as an automated transfer set in motion by Finn himself. He and Ed piece together that Finn was planning to abandon his family and business to start a new life with Floriana. The massacre at the investment house raises red flags for the investors, and Jevan demands that Ed and Alex take initiative in usurping the business from Sean. Marian visits her sister in Ireland, trading the "Floriana" yacht for a small army of men to boost the family's dwindling muscle. Serwa spots Ed and Alex meeting with Jevan, and Sean calls a meeting with them. Ed lays out the situation – that Sean is being pushed out of the family business by investors, with Alex set to take over, and Finn himself never intended to make Sean his heir. Furious, Sean shoots Ed in the leg and cuts ties with the Dumanis, ordering them all out of his house.
8	8	"Episode 8"	Xavier Gens	Carl Joos and Peter Berry	23 April 2020
Sean and Marian hide in an old tenement building belonging to their company. Leif and his mercenary squad pursue the Wallaces, looking to take Jackie hostage, but Billy warns her and the two leave together, setting up passports for fake identities out of the country. Elliot attempts to make contact with Shannon, but Ed turns him away. Anthony's cover is blown, and Marian's men torture him for information. Elliot is assigned to locate Anthony and call it in. Elliot fails to save Anthony, who is killed, and he, in turn, kills Marian's men, staging a shootout between them and Anthony to hide his involvement. Luan attempts to ambush Mosi but is double-crossed, and his accomplices are killed. When his family is threatened, Luan flies into a rage and kills Mosi and all three of his men single-handedly. Floriana gives birth to Finn's daughter, then escapes Leif's house, kicking his mother down the stairs in the process. Alex and his employees track down part of the money Finn had withdrawn, providing results for the investors. Sean, completely disillusioned with his father's legacy, makes a last-ditch retaliation against his enemies, arranging with Lale to plant explosives underneath a Wallace skyscraper. The building collapses and explodes, resulting in a smoke cloud and blackout across downtown London.
9	9	"Episode 9"	Corin Hardy	Claire Wilson	23 April 2020
Elliot is held captive and under interrogation by government agents. Flashbacks reveal the events of the previous day. In the aftermath of the bombing, Sean is wanted as a terrorist and is hiding out on his own. He cracks Anthony's phone and discovers that Elliot is an undercover cop. Jevan is visited by two higher-ranking investors, Kane and Jacob, who have him thrown from his apartment window and killed. Asif's son Nasir wins the election and becomes mayor of London. Lale, disguised as a journalist, assassinates Nasir at his own victory party, leaving his mutilated corpse for Asif to find. Their arrangement complete, Lale sleeps with Sean before returning to Kurdistan. Ed meets with Marian in a graveyard, imploring her to give up Sean. The two pull guns on each other, and Ed shoots Marian, seemingly killing her. Harks informs Vicky that Elliot has been retired from duty as a police officer. Vicky visits Shannon at home, attempting to turn her into an informant. Shannon discerns that Elliot was undercover and shoots Vicky dead. Searching for Sean, Elliot gets his location from Billy. Before visiting Sean's hideout, Elliot is picked up by Kane and Jacob, who order him to keep Alex Dumani in play and prevent Sean from standing trial, leveraging Shannon and Danny's lives to compel him. Elliot visits Sean, who at first considers killing the undercover cop. Instead, he provides Elliot with a microchip containing evidence against the investors, hoping he can bring them down legally. Alex arrives at Sean's hideout, bribing Sean's doormen to let him bring a gun into the room. He plans to kill Sean, but cannot follow through with it as Sean talks him down. Elliot disarms Alex, only to shoot Sean with the gun. Police raid the hideout, and Elliot successfully smuggles Alex to safety, though Harks is killed in the process. Elliot is arrested afterwards, leading to his interrogation. An agent of the investors, disguised as a nurse, secretly instructs him to claim diplomatic immunity under Panama, and his captors are forced to release him. Though seemingly working for the investors now, Elliot extracts Sean's chip from a hiding place in his mouth. A flashback to the previous day reveals Marian survived her shooting, and she is approached by Floriana, who offers to help her.

=== Series 2 (2022) ===
No. overall	No. in series	Title	Directed by	Written by	Original release date
10	1	"Episode 1"	Corin Hardy	Tom Butterworth	20 October 2022
One year after Sean’s death, the Investors have seized control of all organized crime in London, with Ed and Asif employed to supervise the city’s major gang factions and Georgian mafia boss Koba brought to the city to establish a monopoly over their trading activities. Basem Soudani, the leader of the Algerian mafia, purchases an unauthorized weapons shipment. Basem’s right hand man Hakim double-crosses him by reporting the shipment to the Georgians. Koba retaliates by killing several of Basem’s men and torturing Basem’s nephew Faz by forcing him to swallow bullets. Ed deduces that Luan made the unauthorized weapons shipment and advises him against disobeying the Investors, but Luan defiantly refuses to budge. Asif later warns Ed that the Investors will make an example of whoever fails to acquiesce to the new order. Shannon is released from prison, having been acquitted for the murder of DI Chung. However, she cuts off all contact with Ed and Alex, the latter of whom is running the legitimate side of Dumani Finances while struggling with substance abuse. Having been operating abroad as a hitman for the Investors, Elliot kills several of Alex’s clients in Istanbul. The Investors subsequently order him back to London to kill Alex, whom they consider a liability. Rather than kill Alex, Elliot attempts to give him Sean’s microchip, imploring him to use its contents to blackmail the Investors. Fearing for his family’s safety, Alex gives up hope and commits suicide by jumping from the rooftop of Dumani Finances to his death. Meanwhile, Koba launches an attack on Luan’s home. Luan kills many of Koba’s men, but Koba abducts Luan’s wife Mirlinda. Marian attempts to contact Luan to no avail, revealing herself as the weapons supplier.
11	2	"Episode 2"	Corin Hardy	Lauren Sequeira	20 October 2022
Serwa travels to the Mediterranean to visit Billy, who is residing at a seaside villa with Jacqueline and her newborn son, and reports Elliot’s return to London. Against Jacqueline’s wishes, Billy returns to England and reunites with Marian, who is assembling a private army with Floriana’s help. Marian deploys a vengeful Billy to London with two henchmen to find and kill Elliot. Koba holds Mirlinda hostage, promising to release her if Luan provides Marian’s location. Outraged by Koba’s methods, Ed confronts Asif, only to be left devastated at the news of Alex’s suicide. Asif and Koba deduce that Basem made transactions with Marian via Bradbury Holdings, a series of accounts Finn used to hide £1.5 billion of the Investors’ money. Asif tortures the proxy holder for the accounts, a lawyer named Mr. Rutherford, into transferring ownership of the funds to the Investors. Elliot’s new handler Kane instructs him to collaborate with the Georgians to identify the driver of a mysterious red car who is picking off Koba’s men, and allows him to visit his father Charlie, whom the Investors are holding hostage at a residential home to leverage Elliot’s services. Elliot stows Sean’s microchip in his father’s washroom, then heads to a church to privately broker a deal with Joseph Singer, the government agent who interrogated him a year earlier. Elliot offers to provide Singer with intel against the Investors in exchange for safe passage out of the country for himself and Charlie. Luan captures one of Billy’s henchmen and tortures him into revealing Marian’s location, which he relays to Koba. Faz tearfully confesses Hakim’s treachery to his sister Saba, while Koba confronts Basem at the latter’s restaurant. Saba heads to a dockside fish market to alert Basem of Hakim’s distrust. Basem is suddenly shot and killed by the driver of the red car, who flees just as Elliot and the Georgians arrive. Elliot manages to escort Saba to safety, but is confronted by an intoxicated Billy, who attempts to shoot him to no avail. Billy is forced to flee the fish market with the Georgians in pursuit, causing his getaway vehicle to crash into the River Thames. Billy almost drowns, but is rescued by the driver of the red car, who is revealed to be Sean.
12	3	"Episode 3"	Marcela Said	Tom Butterworth and Steve Searle	20 October 2022
One year earlier, Lale and her men rescue a critically wounded Sean from the Hotel Reno just as armed police storm the building. Sean and Lale are captured by government agents and brought to a prison camp, where they are incarcerated for months. Following life-saving surgery, Sean is approached by Singer and his associates, who request Sean testify in court about the Investors in exchange for a new life. Sean insists he be released alongside Lale to assemble a team of mercenaries and dismantle the gangs under the Investors’ control, believing this could destroy the Investors’ influence over London. Singer readily agrees to this plan and facilitates the release of Sean and Lale, who return to London and establish a new headquarters for the Kurds. In the present day, Koba deploys an attack helicopter to Marian’s countryside residence, killing all of her men. Sean calls Marian and manages to warn her of the impending attack, enabling her to escape with Floriana and the latter’s baby, Rosa. The trio are rescued and brought to the Kurdish headquarters in London, where Sean, Billy and Marian reunite. With the Kurds facing financial hardship due to mounting pressure from the Georgians, Sean requests access to the money Finn stole, but Marian flatly refuses. Deducing the Wallaces will betray her to acquire the money, Floriana offers to support Lale and the Kurds financially on the condition they evict the Wallaces from the compound. Sean kills Floriana, keeping his alliance with the Kurds secure.
13	4	"Episode 4"	Marcela Said	Danusia Samal	20 October 2022
Koba and his men bury Mirlinda alive, with Koba demanding Luan announce his capitulation to the Georgians during a meeting of the major gang leaders that night in exchange for her release. Luan takes Ed hostage and forces him to lead them to Mirlinda’s burial site. Luan attempts to exhume his wife, only to be caught by Koba’s men. Deciding to turn on the Investors, Ed attempts to help Luan fight off his attackers, but the pair are subdued and captured. Marian gains access to Floriana’s accounts, only to discover two thirds of Finn’s money is missing, leaving £500 million remaining. Marian secretly makes contact with Shannon, having facilitated her release from prison with the help of a lawyer, and orders her to find and interrogate Rutherford regarding the missing funds. Simultaneously, Asif deploys Elliot to Rutherford’s office to reclaim the outstanding £500 million for the Investors. Elliot and Shannon pull guns on each other after the latter executes Rutherford, but they help each other escape before the police arrive. Billy takes Rosa to a church and leaves her behind, hoping to spare her from a life of crime. Tipped off by Elliot, Singer informs Sean that Koba is hosting a gang meeting that night. Sean, Lale and Billy assemble multiple attack squads and prepare to launch simultaneous attacks on Koba’s installations throughout the city. Koba prepares to execute Ed and Luan in front of the other gang leaders, but his speech is cut short when the Kurds launch their assault, resulting in the deaths of many of Koba’s men and citywide chaos as Singer observes via helicopter. Luan manages to escape in the ensuing chaos, though Ed is left behind. Sean holds a terrified Faz and Saba at gunpoint and orders them to send a message to Koba, announcing his intentions to take the city of London back for himself. Luan returns to Mirlinda’s burial site and finally manages to rescue her, crying in joy.
14	5	"Episode 5"	Nima Nourizadeh	Rowan Athale	20 October 2022
Singer congratulates Sean for his successful operation and reveals the next stage of his plan: Singer will bring down the Investors with the blackmail material stored on Sean’s microchip, which is currently in Elliot’s possession, while the Wallaces will resume control of London’s criminal underworld under Singer’s supervision. Sean proposes an alliance with Luan, but he refuses out of fear of retaliation from Koba. Elliot retrieves Charlie and drives him to the airport, taking Sean’s chip with him. Koba holds Ed hostage and brutally tortures him for information about Sean. Upon learning of her father’s captivity, Shannon desperately calls Elliot for help. Reluctantly, Elliot leaves Charlie at the airport with the microchip and instructs him to await Singer’s arrival, before returning to London. He manages to infiltrate Koba’s compound and rescue Ed, returning him to the motel room where Shannon and Danny are holed up. Ordered by Koba to send a message, Saba confronts Sean at the Kurdish headquarters and reveals Koba’s intentions to negotiate. Sean and Koba meet in a public place, with the former proposing an alliance, promising he can gain access to intel that could cripple the Investors. When Singer makes contact with Charlie, Sean deploys an assassin to kill them and steal back the microchip. Elliot arrives at the airport, but is horrified to find Singer and Charlie murdered. Believing the Investors to be responsible, Elliot tracks Kane down to her private estate and kills her. Sean and Koba upload the contents of the microchip to the internet, compromising the Investors and their illegal activities worldwide.
15	6	"Episode 6"	Nima Nourizadeh	Meg Salter	20 October 2022
With the Investors forced to retreat London in the wake of the data leak, Sean and Koba assume control of all organized crime in the city and propose a partnership with Asif, who agrees on the condition that Lale be handed over to him. To Sean’s horror, Koba facilitates Lale’s abduction and has her delivered to Asif’s home, where she is taken to a drawing room and suspended by her ankles. Marian proposes an alliance with Ed and Shannon, seeking to depose of Sean and reclaim control of the city. Unaware of the data leak, a distraught Elliot makes contact with Shannon and breaks down in front of her. Shannon assures Elliot the Investors are being actively crippled worldwide by the intel Sean released. Realizing Sean ordered the hit on his father, Elliot swears revenge. Asif prepares to execute Lale to avenge Nasir’s murder, but she escapes her binds and severely wounds him with a broken whiskey glass. She then fights her way out of the house, singlehandedly killing many of Asif’s men. Sean finds and appears to rescue Lale, only to deliver her back to Asif’s house, having decided to prioritize his newfound partnership with the Pakistanis. Sean offers Lale one final, sombre apology, before she is dragged back to the drawing room screaming.
16	7	"Episode 7"	Corin Hardy	Rowan Athale	20 October 2022
One week later, Luan launches an attack against the Pakistanis, stealing Asif’s heroin shipment. Asif proposes that Sean and Koba head to Paris to meet French drug queenpin and human trafficker Bibi Agostini to obtain an alternate revenue source. Unbeknownst to Marian, Shannon informs Elliot of the trip to Paris, and he decides to follow Sean and Koba to the French capital to exact revenge. Suspecting Marian’s disloyalty, Billy follows her to the woods and observes her moving the stolen heroin shipment into a shipping container with Ed and Luan’s help. Billy attempts to alert Sean but is caught by Luan, who locks him in the container on Marian’s orders. Elliot makes contact with Saba, whom Sean brought to Paris to act as a translator for Agostini, and persuades her to help him infiltrate Agostini’s nightclub so he can storm Sean’s meeting. Seeking revenge for Basem’s death, Saba readily agrees to help and smuggles a gun into the nightclub for Elliot to find. The plan goes awry when Saba unwittingly directs an armed Elliot to the wrong meeting room via a text message, forcing Elliot to fight his way out of the Parisian nightclub, killing many of Agostini’s men. Agostini deduces Sean and Koba know the intruder and angrily calls off their new business arrangement, ordering them out of her venue. Sean ousts Saba as the mole who assisted Elliot, but quickly deduces Marian betrayed him as Sean only told her and Billy about their trip to Paris. Elliot returns to London and, with Shannon’s help, captures Billy and amputates his left arm with an axe. He then delivers the severed limb to Sean and Marian in a box, much to their shock and horror.
17	8	"Episode 8"	Corin Hardy	Tom Butterworth	20 October 2022
Elliot and Shannon steal Asif’s heroin shipment and transport it to a motel, but Luan is able to trace the shipment via a tracking device planted on the van containing it. Sean viciously attacks Marian for causing Billy’s predicament and angrily cuts off all contact with her. Elliot calls Sean and orders him to kill Koba, leveraging Billy’s life. On Koba’s orders, Hakim prepares to execute Saba for her actions in Paris. Saba overpowers Hakim and fatally shoots him. Sean and Koba depart London with a team of mercenaries to find Billy. While stopping for food at a service station, Sean misdirects Koba’s men to an airfield while lying about Elliot’s location, then tricks Koba into eating food laced with a neurotoxin which paralyzes and kills him. Luan deploys armed gunmen to the Dumanis’ motel room. Ed and Shannon eliminate Luan’s men to defend the shipment, forcing Luan to retreat. Sean delivers Koba’s body to an abandoned scrapyard where Elliot is holding Billy hostage. Before he can kill Sean, Billy stabs Elliot with a screwdriver, enabling Sean to attack. Following a prolonged fistfight, Elliot overpowers Sean and attempts to hang him, but relents and instead leaves Sean to be arrested, voicing his desire to replace Sean as London’s new kingpin. Sean is subsequently remanded in custody, where he is visited by Billy. Elliot quickly assumes leadership of the major gang factions in London, working alongside Ed and Shannon. Forced to acquiesce to the new order, Marian attends a meeting of the major gang leaders chaired by Elliot. Asif goes into exile after losing his power and influence over the city and forges a partnership with Lale, whom he decided to spare for his son’s murder.

=== Series 3 (2025) ===
No. overall	No. in series	Title	Directed by	Written by	Original release date
18	1	"Episode 1"	Kim Hong Sun	Peter McKenna	20 March 2025
Seven years earlier, Jack O’Doherty pursues Elliot’s wife Naomi down a motorway while her terrified son Samuel sits in the back of her car. Having taken an incriminating document belonging to the Vaughn Alliance, Naomi manages to evade Jack and his men, but her car is blindsided by a truck. A hooded man approaches the wreckage and steals the file before leaving the scene as the car explodes, killing Naomi and Samuel. In the present day, a ton of cocaine under Elliot’s supervision is spiked with fentanyl, resulting in the deaths of hundreds of Londoners, including Luan’s eldest daughter Elira. Elliot calls a meeting with the major gang leaders, promising to find out who is responsible for the crisis. Simone Thearle, the new mayor of London who is advocating for the legalization of all narcotics in the city, launches a manhunt for Elliot. Accompanied by a vengeful Luan, Elliot heads to the depot where the original cocaine shipment was stored. Flashbacks reveal the shipment was stolen by a mysterious hitman named Zeek, who swapped the cocaine with a contaminated batch. Elliot reviews the CCTV footage to the depot and recognizes Zeek as the driver who killed his wife and son. Analysing the Satnav history from the van which stored the shipment, Elliot and Luan ascertain the swap took place at an abandoned fairground on the city outskirts owned by Cornelius Quinn, Marian’s older brother. Following a firefight with Cornelius’ men, Elliot and Luan investigate Cornelius’ caravan and discover his connection to Sean. Elliot visits Sean in prison and demands he reveal information about Zeek. Sean reveals to a shocked Elliot that Naomi’s death was a targeted assassination, but refuses to disclose further details and allows himself to be escorted away by guards, ignoring Elliot’s crazed protests.
19	2	"Episode 2"	Kim Hong Sun	Peter McKenna and David Mar Stefansson	20 March 2025
As Sean is being transported to a court hearing, Billy and Cornelius assault the prison van containing him, eliminate the police escort, and extract Sean. Their plan goes awry when their getaway vehicle is ambushed by Albanians, causing Sean to become separated from his family as he flees on foot. Believing Sean orchestrated the spiking from prison, Luan places a £2 million bounty on his head, forcing Sean to evade local gangs and police as he traverses the city alone. Having arranged a helicopter extraction from Greenwich pier, Billy and Cornelius visit Marian’s barricaded home and request help from her henchmen, only to be turned away. Out of desperation, Sean infiltrates the Kurdish headquarters and requests help from Lale, but she shoots him in the abdomen and reports his presence to Luan. Sean manages to escape the compound, but later passes out due to blood loss. He is rescued and nursed back to health by Ronnie and Deborah, two locals indebted to Finn for helping their son. Ronnie manages to escort Sean to Greenwich via a sewer tunnel, but is killed by the pursuing Albanians. Before Sean can reach the helicopter, he is stopped and held at gunpoint by Elliot, once again demanding answers regarding his family’s fate. Zeek suddenly arrives, knocking Elliot unconscious and abducting Sean, driving away just as the Albanians catch up to them. Ordered to kill Sean, Zeek transports him to an abandoned apartment complex and ties him to a chair. Sean attempts to bribe his way out, but Zeek shoots him to death.
20	3	"Episode 3"	Farren Blackburn	Danusia Samal	20 March 2025
Two squatters named Ali and Moe discover Sean’s body and deliver it to Luan in exchange for the £2 million bounty. Their decision to brag about their supposed killing of Sean at a local pub results in word rapidly spreading through London’s criminal underworld, eventually drawing in Elliot, Billy and Cornelius. An enraged Billy kills Moe, while Elliot kidnaps Ali when he reveals he knows Zeek’s identity. Ali manages to escape when Elliot’s car is surrounded by police, but Zeek tracks him down and kills him. Elliot is arrested for firearm possession and detained in custody, where he is visited by Simone. Simone requests Elliot’s aid in exposing those who carried out the spiking in exchange for his freedom. Elliot agrees and is given one week to find answers. Simone’s chief advisor Henry Amiel chastises her for illegally facilitating Elliot’s release, but she is undeterred. Luan delivers Sean’s body to Marian, announces his intentions to kill Billy and Cornelius, and offers to spare her if she doesn’t interfere. A devastated Marian decides to reunite with Billy and Cornelius, and the trio form an alliance. Lale is revealed to be in possession of Elliot’s stolen shipment, which is being stored in dozens of beer barrels.
21	4	"Episode 4"	Farren Blackburn	Tolula Dada	20 March 2025
Marian hosts a family funeral for Sean at a local church. On the day of the funeral, Zeek approaches Marian and offers his condolences for her son’s death, but she turns him away. Hoping to take out the Wallaces in one fell swoop, Luan assembles a team of mercenaries and infiltrates the now-vacant church, only to realize it is a trap just as the Wallaces and their henchmen seal the doors to the building and launch an all-out assault, killing all of Luan’s men. Luan attempts to take Marian hostage. Billy shoots Luan, causing him to flee to the Dushaj household. He manages to evacuate the remainder of his family as the Wallaces converge on them. Simone cross references road traffic camera footage with information provided by Elliot and ascertains the license plates to the van containing the shipment were swapped at a local garage. Elliot and Shannon torture the mechanic who conducted the swap into revealing the new plate details, enabling Simone to locate the missing van which Lale had driven to a vacant warehouse to transfer the shipment into a different vehicle. Lale escapes with the shipment just as Elliot and Shannon arrive. Investigating the location, Elliot discovers a logo belonging to the Vaughn Alliance, an organization he believes Naomi investigated prior to her death. Against Shannon’s wishes, Elliot gains access to his father’s old house in search of documents that belonged to Naomi, but is horrified to discover his stolen shipment stacked in the kitchen. Elliot attempts to flee the house, only to be confronted and held at gunpoint by Zeek.
22	5	"Episode 5"	Tessa Hoffe	Kevin Rundle	20 March 2025
In a flashback seven months prior, Asif prepares to torture Lale for Nasir’s murder, but relents when she reveals she is pregnant with Sean’s child. Hoping to use the baby as leverage against the Wallaces, and facing increasing pressure due to the government freezing his assets, Asif abducts her to Lahore. He is later visited by Marian, who offers Asif access to her trade routes into London in exchange for her grandchild’s safety. Asif later receives an enticing offer from an unknown contact requesting his aid in moving a new product into London. He terminates his business deal with Marian, lying that complications during the pregnancy had led to the baby’s death. Asif proceeds to blackmail Lale into a partnership, acknowledging she would do anything to ensure the safety and wellbeing of her unborn child. Lale defiantly insists her child means nothing to her. Asif later returns to London with Lale. Upon leaving the airport, Lale escapes her captors and flees into a vacant office block, where she gives birth to Sean’s child. She manages to kill several of Asif’s men, but her attempts to escape fail when she is surrounded, and her baby is taken away. Lale initially considers shooting her son to spare him a life of torment at the hands of Asif but relents, finally acquiescing to Asif’s demands. Asif allows a distraught Lale to walk free, promising that he will ‘be in touch’.
23	6	"Episode 6"	Tessa Hoffe	Mary Fox & Marty Thornton	20 March 2025
Zeek captures Elliot, holding him hostage at a derelict school building. Ed, Shannon, Faz and Saba discover the stolen shipment in Charlie’s home, with Ed putting a hit out on Elliot. Shannon makes contact with Zeek, having arranged Elliot’s capture beforehand. At this point, Ed and Shannon are revealed as Zeek’s employers, with the former having orchestrated the spiking alongside Asif and Amiel, and who now intends to frame and depose of Elliot. When news of Elliot’s supposed treachery reaches the Wallaces, Billy and Cornelius interrogate Faz for information regarding his whereabouts. Billy executes Faz when he fails to reveal anything. A blindfolded Elliot attempts to escape the school, but is shot by Shannon. Elliot stabs Shannon in the foot during the ensuing scuffle, but she escapes before Elliot can identify her. Elliot then brutally attacks Zeek for his family’s deaths. Zeek overpowers Elliot and attempts to strangle him to death, but ultimately relents and decides to release him. Shannon learns of Zeek’s noncompliance just as Elliot shows up at her house seeking help. When she goes upstairs to retrieve a concealed shotgun, Elliot makes a hasty getaway when he notices Shannon’s bloodied shoe and realizes that she has betrayed him. Lale pulls up outside the house in a car and instructs Elliot to ‘get in’. The duo proceed to drive away as Shannon fires on them.
24	7	"Episode 7"	Kim Hong Sun	Kevin Rundle	20 March 2025
Lale reveals that she planted Elliot’s shipment in Charlie’s home on Asif’s orders. An enraged Elliot briefly attacks Lale, but the pair reach an uneasy alliance when Lale reveals Asif is holding her son hostage. Elliot and Lale infiltrate Asif’s mansion and spy on a meeting between Asif and Amiel. Elliot informs Simone of Amiel’s affiliation with Asif, while Lale finds and rescues her baby. Asif demands Elliot surrender Lale to him in exchange for information regarding Naomi’s death. Lale slashes Asif’s throat, killing him. The duo fight their way out of the mansion, killing many of Asif’s men. Zeek departs London and reunites with his mother Emi, who is detained at a mental health treatment facility. Ed makes contact with Ray, an old acquaintance and pawnbroker who vouched for Zeek, and kills him after obtaining Zeek’s address. Ed later forces entry into the now-vacant address and discovers via old photos that Zeek is Finn’s son. Elliot and Lale return to the Kurdish headquarters, but Lale’s second-in-command Merwan betrays them by revealing their presence to the Wallaces, enabling Billy and Cornelius to subdue and capture Elliot. Furious at Lale for lying about her captivity, as well as her affiliation with Elliot, Merwan orders her to leave the compound, but Lale bludgeons him to death. Zeek infiltrates Marian’s home and leaves behind his phone alongside a note revealing his role in Sean’s murder, before escaping unseen. A badly battered Elliot is brought before a meeting of the major gang leaders, including Luan. Ed insists Elliot be executed immediately, but Marian interjects and uses Zeek’s phone to expose Ed as the mastermind behind Sean’s death.
25	8	"Episode 8"	Kim Hong Sun	Peter McKenna	20 March 2025
Simone angrily confronts Amiel about his role in the spiking, but he blackmails her into silence by threatening to expose her ongoing drug addiction and shady dealings with Elliot. Billy and Cornelius torture Ed for information. When his family is threatened, Ed reveals he orchestrated the spiking on behalf of investor Isabel Vaughn, the leader of an international poppy manufacturing organization called the Vaughn Alliance. Luan and Cornelius kidnap Shannon and Danny, while Billy accompanies a vindicated Elliot to City Hall, where Vaughn is chairing a meeting with Amiel and other Investors. When their cover is blown, Elliot kills Vaughn’s security detail, while Billy shoots Vaughn and kills Amiel. Held at gunpoint, Vaughn defends the spiking as necessary to shift public perception towards drug legalization and to foment the establishment of a highly profitable new industry for the Investors. She reveals the Vaughn Alliance employed Naomi to draw up the legalization frameworks, and that her death was ordered by Finn Wallace, which Billy denies. Promising to kill whoever is responsible, Elliot departs City Hall and returns to Charlie’s home, finding Naomi’s old documentation. He later delivers Naomi’s files to Simone, imploring her to use them to further her legalization campaign. Resigned to his fate, Ed taunts Marian for her heartless nature and insists he will die knowing he was loved, before Marian shoots him in the head. Luan prepares to execute Shannon and Danny to avenge Elira, but cannot bring himself to do it. Simone successfully announces her plan to legalize all drugs in the British capital to the press, which she hopes will cripple the gangs of London. A remorseful Billy invites Elliot to a secluded warehouse and instructs Elliot to kill him, revealing he was present at the scene of Naomi’s accident, and that he left Naomi and Samuel to die after stealing the former’s file. The episode subsequently ends as two gunshots are heard.

== Production ==
In an interview with Sky News in April 2020, Gareth Evans stated that while initially hired with his creative partner Matt Flannery to "make a film franchise" out of The Getaway video game series (in particular the third game, 2006 action-adventure Gangs of London, developed by London Studio), inspired by Evans' The Raid duology of action crime films, he had instead felt like "if we were going to do a film franchise, we would have two-thirds of our running time focused purely on our central characters, and then only a third left to explore the side characters that populate that world", and so on deciding that "we wouldn't do justice to the myriad of different diverse cultures and ethnicities that make up the city [I then] pitched it back saying this should be a TV show because you can afford to go off and detour for 10 to 15 minutes and spend time with other characters, and learn about them in more detail." A short film adaptation of the game series had previously been in development in 2005, when The Getaway co-creator Katie Ellwood had first partnered with Amber Templemore-Finlayson, before the project entered development hell (although the duo would continue to collaborate as "Bert and Bertie").

During filming, production visited St Clere Estate in Kent to stage a Traveller site and Dartford to film a speed boat scene near Queen Elizabeth II Bridge. A driving scene was also featured on Pilgrim's Way. Gareth Evans also directed most of the action sequences for the first series.

In June 2020, it was renewed for a for a second series, with Corin Hardy taking over as showrunner. In July 2021, production on the second series had been halted for 10 days following a crew member testing positive for COVID-19. Filming for the second series began on 31 May 2021 and wrapped in February 2022.

In November 2022, it was renewed for a third series, with production starting in October 2023.

In August 2025, it was renewed for a fourth series.

== Release ==
The first series was co-produced with the American pay network Cinemax, which was expected to air the programme alongside Sky Atlantic. However, following an announcement in January 2020 by parent company WarnerMedia that Cinemax would no longer be developing original programming, its producers began negotiating to move the series to another U.S. outlet, with Cinemax's blessing. AMC took over distribution, with the first series premiering on 1 October 2020 on AMC+.

The second series premiered on 20 October 2022. The third series premiered on 20 March 2025.

== Reception ==
=== Audience viewership ===
The series became Sky Atlantic's second-biggest original drama launch of all time, with a 7-day cumulative audience of 2.23 million viewers for the opening episode.

=== Critical response ===
On review aggregator Rotten Tomatoes, the first series holds an approval rating of 91% based on 33 reviews. The website's critics consensus reads, "A modern crime family masterpiece, Gangs of London builds its own empire atop tried and true mafia turf – complete with engaging drama, exhilarating action, and fine performances all around" GQ said it is "a strong early contender to be the best show of the summer."

On review aggregator Rotten Tomatoes, the second series holds an approval rating of 81% based on 16 reviews. The website's critics consensus reads, "Gangs of London's second series can sometimes border on a lot of sound and fury signifying nothing, but fans of the series' crunchy action and swaggering attitude ought to remain satisfied."

== Book ==
In December 2022, a graphic novel titled A Gangs of London Story: Ghosts was released and is set between the first and second series. It was written by Corin Hardy and Rowan Athale and illustrated by Ferenc Nothof.
