= Annaya =

Indonesian drama television series

- Genre: Drama; Romance; Family
- Created by: Titin Suryani
- Written by: Team Verona
- Directed by: Anurag Vaishnav
- Starring: Audi Marissa; Ridwan Ghany; Lenna Tan; Zora Vidyanata; Miranty Dewi
- Theme music composer: Mahalini
- Opening theme: "Sisa Rasa" — Mahalini
- Ending theme: "Sisa Rasa" — Mahalini
- Composer: Joel Christian
- Country of origin: Indonesia
- Original language: Indonesian
- No. of seasons: 1
- No. of episodes: 21

Production
- Executive producer: Titin Suryani
- Producer: Titin Suryani
- Production locations: Jakarta, Indonesia
- Cinematography: Mame Shulla
- Editor: Cutting Point Post
- Camera setup: Multi-camera
- Production company: Verona Pictures

Original release
- Network: ANTV
- Release: 18 August – 9 September 2022

Annaya is an Indonesian drama television series produced by Verona Pictures which premiered 18 August 2022 on ANTV replacing Aku Titipkan Cinta. It starred Audi Marissa, Ridwan Ghany, and Rama Michael in the lead role. The show went off air on 9 September 2022 due to low ratings.

== Plot ==
Annaya (Audi Marissa) and Risyad (Ridwan Ghani), are a married couple who live happily, but feel incomplete because they do not have children despite doing various efforts.

The two of them decided to do Artificial Insemination. On the day they inseminate, Risyad's sperm is exchanged for Zavi's (Rama Michael) by Kemal (Fadil Joan), who has a grudge against Zavi's wife.

Zavi is the husband of Nikita (Hilda Vitria Khan), who recently recovered from cancer treatment. Nikita, who had been having an affair with Kemal, panicked when Zavi caught the two of them. Zavi threatens to divorce Nikita. Nikita got the idea to maintain her household by getting pregnant.

Nikita secretly Insemination with Zavi's sperm which had been stored in the sperm bank before he underwent chemotherapy. Annaya's insemination process was successful while Nikita did not.

Risyad suspects Annaya's pregnancy because the test results prove that it is very difficult for her to have children. Zavi finally finds out that the child that Annaya is carrying is his flesh and blood. Zavi tries to get close to Annaya for the sake of the baby she is carrying, but Annaya really hates Zavi because of the death of his sister, Baskara Dwi Andika (Sebryan Yosvien) involving Zavi.

Will Zavi be able to melt Annaya's heart and what will Risyad do when he finds out the truth?

== Cast ==
=== Main ===
- Audi Marissa as Annaya: Risyad's wife; Baskara's sister.
- Ridwan Ghany as Risyad: Annaya's husband; Tantri's son.

=== Recurring ===
- Hilda Vitria Khan as Nikita: Zavi's wife.
- Rama Michael as Zavi: Nikita's husband; Ario and Hanum's son; Nindy's sister.
- Elryan Carlen as Gilang: Zavi's personal assistant.
- Zora Vidyanata as Laras: Nikita's aunt.
- Lucky Alamsyah as Ario: Hanum's husband; Zavi and Nindy's father; Nikita's father-in-law.
- Lenna Tan as Hanum: Ario's wife; Zavi and Nindy's mother; Nikita's mother-in-law.
- Miranty Dewi as Tantri: Risyad's mother; Annaya's mother-in-law.
- Aline Pertiwi as Yani: Annaya's best friend.
- Fadil Joan as Kemal: Nindy's love interest.
- Dosma Hazenbosch as Nindy: Ario and Hanum's daughter; Zavi's sister; Kemal's love interest.
- Neezha Rais as Wiwin: Annaya's best friend; Sandy's ex-wife; Rafa's mother.
- Usman Ali as Rafa: Sandy and Wiwin's son.
- Kevin Andrean as Sandy: Wiwin's ex-husband; Salma's husband; Rafa's father.
- Irene Librawati as Lia: Sandy's mother.
- Sebryan Yosvien as Baskara Dwi Andika: Annaya's brother. (Dead)

== Productions ==
=== Development ===
This show was first titled Kutitipkan Cinta di Rahimmu and later changed its title to Annaya. The first promo trailer of this show was released on 12 August 2022.

=== Casting ===
Previously Amanda Salmakhira was originally chosen to play the role of Annaya, but was later replaced by Audi Marissa. This show is the return of Audi Marissa to the small screen after 2 years of vacuum due to giving birth to their first child. Ridwan Ghani was roped in to play Risyad. and Rama Michael was chosen to play Zavi. Zora Vidyanata to play the role of Laras. Hilda Vitria Khan was selected to portray Nikita.

== Reception ==
In the first episode, it was only able to achieve with TRP 1.2 and audience share 7.3%.
