= The Getaway: Black Monday =

2004 video game

- Developer: London Studio
- Publisher: Sony Computer Entertainment
- Director: Naresh Hirani
- Producer: Peter Edward
- Designer: Chun Wah Kong
- Artists: Sam Coates; Ravinder Singh
- Writers: Chun Wah Kong; Alex Carlyle; Dominic Robilliard
- Composer: Jonathan Williams
- Platform: PlayStation 2
- Release: EU: 12 November 2004; NA: 11 January 2005
- Genre: Action-adventure
- Mode: Single-player

The Getaway: Black Monday is a 2004 action-adventure video game developed by London Studio and published by Sony Computer Entertainment for the PlayStation 2. It is a sequel to 2002's The Getaway. The Getaway: Black Monday is set in London, with new characters. A third game, described as a spin-off of the series and entitled Gangs of London, was released exclusively for the PlayStation Portable in 2006.

== Gameplay ==
Similar to the prequel, The Getaway: Black Monday is an action-adventure game played from third-person view in which the player controls the two lead characters Ben 'Mitch' Mitchell, who is a member of London SO19 and Eddie O'Connor, a boxer-turned-heister, in an open world as they carry out their missions for game progression. Both of the characters can perform a series of physical tasks such as walking, sprinting, rolling, shooting, driving and taking cover during a gunfight. Black Monday introduced new stealth-centered missions where player control Sam Thompson as she can sneak around more easily than Mitchell and O'Connor, being able to grasp and hang around the balconies and edges. She, however, is unable engage in combat like Mitch or O'Connor.

== Plot ==
The game begins with a flashback sequence: Sergeant Ben "Mitch" Mitchell (Bob Cryer) is chasing down an armed teenage robber. The teen robber stops running, instead aiming his gun at Mitch. Mitch orders him to drop his weapon but the teen then chooses to try to turn around and escape. Mitch fires his weapon, which makes it seem like he purposely shot the teen in the back. One year later, Mitch is on his first day back on the team. The team heads towards an East London housing estate, where they believe the Collins Crew is storing drugs in a flat.

The team breaks into the flat but finds it empty (with only two Collins members), but PC Harvey (Seth Jee) and another SO19 officer find a door that leads to the flat next door and find tons of drugs. They soon chase them down in the apartment complex and PC Harvey is injured in the leg. Mitch single-handedly hunts down the remaining suspects, who take an old woman hostage in the roof. Back at the station, Mitch is taunted about the teenager shooting incident and almost loses his temper. Inspector Munroe (Karl Jenkinson) then informs them of a shooting at a boxing club in Shoreditch. After arriving at the scene, Mitch chases Jimmer Collins (Glenn Doherty), who manages to escape.

Munroe suspects a Latvian gang is responsible and assigns Mitch and Stoppard (Mark Beardsmore) to join a unit of SO19, who are preparing to raid a scrapyard in Lambeth to detain the suspect, Levi Stratov (Paul Kaye). Stratov is immediately bailed out and leads Mitch to Jackie Philips (Kerry Ann Smith). She informs them of a deal going down at Holborn Tube Station on Platform 4. Mitchell attempts to arrest the trader, but he escapes and is arrested afterwards. Jackie makes a phone call, saying she knows the leader, as the phone goes dead. When they arrive, a man shoots Munroe and leaves him in Jackie's apartment, which explodes, killing him. Jackie left a note saying "Skobel", while the police know a gun trade is going down. Mitch beats the trader and extracts the info, which leads the team to a warehouse.

The game shifts to Eddie O'Connor's (Dave Legeno) story. Nick and Jimmer Collins had originally planned to steal credit card codes and print their own cards. When Danny West (Denis Gilmore) owes a gambling debt to Collins, he forces West to get people to steal the credit card codes from the Skobel Group and steal the Icon (a small religious artefact, which in the end is revealed to be a case in which diamonds are hidden), so that no one realizes the card codes were stolen. Eddie, along with others, raid the Skobel Group's bank to retrieve the Icon, but everyone is killed, except Eddie, who is tortured; Sam Thompson (Jane Peachey), who escapes through a vent; and John the Cleaner (Tanner Akif), who double-crosses and runs off with the Icon. Eddie and Sam escape; they find John dead at a bar, but Eddie manages to retrieve the icon.

They return to the boxing club and see Mitch enter. Sam sneaks in and sees Danny and a young boy, presumably Errol's (Mike Harvey) son, dead, as well as Liam Spencer from the first game. Sam left a laptop at the bank and wants to return. If Eddie says "yes", they shoot their way in, but if "no", Eddie leaves her and she sneaks in. Sam retrieves the laptop. If Eddie escorts her, she doesn't get caught, but if he doesn't, she gets caught. Eddie tracks down Collins, who mentions that Viktor Skobel (Robert Jezek), the CEO of the Skobel Group, killed West. Yuri (Ronnie Yakubouski) shoots Collins' right hand three times before finishing him with a shot in the head. Eddie follows Yuri to lead to Skobel. He is ambushed by Nadya Prushnatova (Yana Yanezic), who has Jackie. Sergeant Mitch raids the warehouse (this is where his story ended off) and Eddie kills Yuri.

He then either saves Jackie Philips or lets her fall to her death. Either way, Eddie escapes and chases Viktor to his house, where he kills Nadya, and if the player chooses to, Zara (Jo Lawden). If Sam hasn't been captured, she sneaks into Alexei's (John Albasiny) car. Eddie chases Viktor to his yacht and kills Alexei. There are four different endings depending on the player's actions throughout the game. The final scene shows the outside of the pumping station. The police are standing by, and Sam and Mitch stand there if they are alive.

== Reception ==
Reception

Aggregate score
Aggregator	Score
Metacritic	57/100

Review scores
Publication	Score
Edge	3/10
Electronic Gaming Monthly	6/10
Eurogamer	5/10
Famitsu	30/40
Game Informer	7/10
GamePro	3/5
GameRevolution	D
GameSpot	6.4/10
GameSpy	2.5/5
GameZone	6.7/10
IGN	6.5/10
Official U.S. PlayStation Magazine	2/5
Detroit Free Press	2/4
The Sydney Morning Herald	2.5/5

Black Monday received a "Platinum" sales award from the Entertainment and Leisure Software Publishers Association (ELSPA).

The Getaway: Black Monday was met with "mixed" reception upon release. In Japan, Famitsu gave it a score of two eights and two sevens for a total of 30 out of 40.

Maxim gave the game a score of four stars out of five and said: "Fun as this game is to play, the best moments come when you just sit back and observe. Wonderfully acted, written, and directed motion-capture cut scenes play like the Snatch follow-up Guy Ritchie should have made, further evidence of the narrowing gap between video game and movie production values". On the contrary, Detroit Free Press gave it a score of two stars out of four and stated that "the underworld figures are colorful, and the language [the characters] use has a life of its own. But the game's design is bollocks". The Sydney Morning Herald also gave it a similar score of two-and-a-half stars out of five and said: "The artificial intelligence of other characters is often dim. Enemies are often oblivious to your nearby presence, while colleagues provide little genuine assistance".

== Sequel ==
A third game, described as a spin-off of the series and entitled Gangs of London, was released to the PlayStation Portable on 1 September 2006. A television adaptation of the same name began airing in 2020 on Sky Atlantic.
