= Aku Titipkan Cinta =

Indonesian drama television series

- Genre: Drama; Romance
- Created by: Ferry Fernandez
- Written by: Team Tobali
- Directed by: Sondang Pratama
- Starring: Rezky Aditya; Citra Kirana; Arief Fadhillah; Puspita Sarry; Zikri Daulay; Barry Prima; Tabah Penemuan Siregar
- Theme music composer: Tri Suaka
- Opening theme: "Aku Bukan Jodohnya" by Tri Suaka
- Ending theme: "Aku Bukan Jodohnya" by Tri Suaka
- Composer: Matthews Siahaan
- Country of origin: Indonesia
- Original language: Indonesian
- No. of seasons: 1
- No. of episodes: 50

Production
- Executive producer: Utojo Sutjiutama
- Producer: Ferry Fernandez
- Production locations: Jakarta, Indonesia
- Running time: 120 minutes
- Production company: Tobali Putra Production

Original release
- Network: ANTV
- Release: 27 June – 16 August 2022

Aku Titipkan Cinta (lit. 'I Leave Love') is an Indonesian television drama series produced by Tobali Putra Production which aired on 27 June 2022 on ANTV replacing Terpaksa menikahi Tuan Muda. It stars Citra Kirana and Rezky Adhitya in the lead role.

The series went off air on 16 August 2022 due to low ratings. The show was replaced by Annaya from 18 August 2022.

== Plot ==
Fate brings together Khanza (Citra Kirana) and Zaki (Rezky Adhitya), Zaki must pretend to be a home-based tempe factory worker owned by Khanza's father (Barry Prima) in order to persuade the residents to sell their land for the construction of an apartment owned by his company.

Gradually over time the seeds of love between the two began to grow. However, the presence of Salman (Arief Fadhillah), Zaki's half-brother and Bebi (Michelle Joan), the half-sister of Khanza, adds to the twists and turns of the story in their lives.

Will fate unite Zaki to Khanza? And what if Khanza finds out that Zaki is the son of a businessman who has made the Khanza family suffer?

== Cast ==
=== Main ===
- Rezky Aditya as Zaki Adinata: Khanza's husband; Haikal and Mira's son; Eliza's step-son.
- Citra Kirana as Khanza Kirana: Zaki's wife; Sofid and Sarah's daughter; Bebi's half-sister.

=== Recurring ===
- Ari Wibowo as Haikal Adinata: Zaki's father; Salman's step-father; Mira's ex-husband; Eliza's husband; Rossi's brother.
- Barry Prima as H. Sofid: Sarah's husband; Khanza and Bebi's father.
- Ira Wibowo as Rossi Adinata: Haikal's sister; Farel's mother.
- Puspita Sari as Eliza: Marco's first wife; Haikal's second wife; Zaki's step-mother; Salman's mother.
- Michelle Joan as Bebi: Khanza's half-sister; Sofid's half-daughter; Salman's former obsessive lover; Farel's love interest.
- Zikri Daulay as Farel Adinata: Zaki's personal assistant; Rossi's son; Bebi's love interest.
- Tabah Penemuan Siregar as Marco: Eliza's ex-husband; Salman's father. (Dead)
- Arief Fadhillah as Salman Prasetya: Zaki's half-brother; Marco and Eliza's son.
- Mentari de Marelle as Rachel Wijaya: Zaki's ex-fiancée.
- Intan Mita as Sumi: Adinata's maid.
- Mehnaz Marinez as Mira Adinata: Haikal's ex-wife; Zaki's mother. (Dead)
- Gessy Selvia as Sarah: Sofid's wife; Khanza and Bebi's mother. (Dead)

== Production ==
=== Development ===
This series was first titled Cinta CEO di Langit Istiqlal and changed to Aku Titipkan Cinta. The first promo of this series was released on 10 June 2022.

=== Casting ===
Rezky Adhitya to play the male lead, Zaki Adinata and the female lead Khanza, signed by Citra Kirana. The show marks the second collaboration between Adhitya and Kirana as they previously co-starred in Istri Tercinta (2020). This series is the reunion of actor Ari Wibowo and actress Ira Wibowo after 30 years. Michelle Joan was chosen to play Bebi.

== Reception ==
In the first episode, is in nineteen place with TVR 1.7 and audience share 9.4%.

== Awards and nominations ==
Year	Award	Category	Recipient	Result	Ref(s)
2022	Festival Film Bandung 2022	Best Actress	Citra Kirana	Nominated	
