= Leo Consul =

Filipino actor and TV host (born 1987)

- Born: Leonardo Jabadan Consul; August 27, 1987 (age 38); Bolinao, Pangasinan, Philippines
- Occupations: Actor, presenter, singer
- Years active: 2000s–

Leonardo Jabadan Consul (born August 27, 1987) is a Filipino actor and television host who has appeared in Indonesian television series and variety shows.

== Early life and education ==
Leonardo Jabadan Consul was born on August 27, 1987 in Bolinao, Pangasinan. He professed growing up in poverty, working as a cleaner for buses and sleeping in carton boxes. His mother left him to the care of his stepfather when Leo was two years old to work as domestic helper in Malaysia.

He graduated from the University of the Philippines Baguio with a bachelor's degree in broadcasting. Consul went to Indonesia in 2011 to work as a math and English teacher at an international school. This was to honor his mother's dream to have a child who is a teacher.

== Career ==
=== Television ===
Before moving in Indonesia, Consul used to audition for reality shows in the Philippines but was never accepted. He was a contestant in season 4 of StarStruck which aired from 2006 to 2007.

Consul was the sole-Filipino host of Eat Bulaga! Indonesia, an adaptation of the Philippine variety show of the same name. He also co-hosted It's Showtime Indonesia from 2019 to 2020.

His first acting role was in the 2016 television series Cinta Yang Tukar. He later appeared in Love Story the Series (2021–2022) and Terpaksa menikahi Tuan Muda (2022–2023). Consul also appeared in the Singaporean series, Kisses From Death.

Consul remarked on how he was frequently cast in light roles, his characters usually are college student. He noted how religion affected the work he could do as an actor in Indonesia, noting he never did kissing scenes. He also had to speak Bahasa Indonesia.

In 2023, Consul appeared in Fit Check: Confessions of an Ukay Queen with Filipino actors. Consul started to focus on his career in the Philippines by signing with talent agency, ALV Talent Circuit in late 2025.

=== Film ===
Consul appeared in the film Bukan Jodoh Biasa and has acted in the upcoming film Kamu Harus Mati.

=== Music career ===
Signed under Sony BMG Indonesia, Consul auditioned to become part of a boy band. However that stint did not push through due to visa-related issues.

Consul released a single in 2018, entitled "Kamu" which is an Indonesian cover of "Ikaw" performed by Yeng Constantino. He also released the single "Biro".
