= It's Showtime Indonesia =

- Title Card
- Genre: Variety show
- Created by: ABS-CBN Corporation; Bobet Vidanes
- Based on: It's Showtime By: ABS-CBN Corporation; Bobet Vidanes
- Developed by: MNC Productions Entertainment; ABS-CBN Studios
- Directed by: Terry Sancoko; Bambang Retno
- Creative directors: Bobet Vidanes; Boyet Baldemor
- Presented by: Raffi Ahmad; Luna Maya; Chika Jessica; Indra Herlambang; Leo Consul
- Judges: Various
- Opening theme: "Showtime" performed by It's Showtime hosts
- Country of origin: Indonesia
- Original language: Indonesian

Production
- Executive producers: Gerryndra Danurwendo; Carlo Katigbak; Cory Vidanes; Laurenti M. Dyogi; Luis L. Andrada
- Producers: Sari Nugraha Ningtyas; Maartvi Jati Prastowo; Bobet Vidanes; Boyet Baldemor; Peter Edward Dizon
- Production locations: Studio 10; MNC Studios; Jakarta, Indonesia
- Camera setup: Multi-camera
- Running time: 90 minutes
- Production companies: MNC Productions Entertainment; ABS-CBN Studios

Original release
- Network: MNCTV
- Release: 25 March 2019 – 9 May 2020

It's Showtime Indonesia was an Indonesian talent variety television show that premiered on March 25, 2019 and concluded on May 9, 2020 on MNCTV. It is Indonesia adaptation of It's Showtime by ABS-CBN Studios.

== History ==
On March 19, 2019, a news report from Rappler announced the acquisition of an Indonesian franchise of It's Showtime in time for the program's tenth year celebration. The original program's business unit head Peter Edward Dizon shared a teaser video of the hosts on Facebook. It's Showtime became ABS-CBN's first non-narrative format franchise bought by a foreign company. With the franchise deal, familiar segments such as "Sine Mo ‘To", "Cash-Ya! Kaya!", "Ansabe", "Copy Cut", "PUROKatatawanan", "HulANINO", "GAGAMBAttle" and "Bida Dance" were to be adapted for the Indonesian audience.

Creator and director Bobet Vidanes, hosts Jugs Jugueta and Teddy Corpuz, and ABS-CBN head of TV production Laurenti Dyogi were among few of the Filipino visitors to watch the pilot program on March 25, 2019.

According to co-host Leo Consul, It's Showtime Indonesia had limited success compared to the original Philippine program due to its time slot and a lack of a figure similar to Vice Ganda from the original variety show.

== Hosts ==
=== Main ===
- Raffi Ahmad
- Luna Maya
- Chika Jessica
- Indra Herlambang
- Leo Consul

=== Featuring ===
- Mus Brother

== Segments ==
Ayo Nari
Adapted from Bida Kapamilya/Dance. Aspiring dance groups battle out in the It's Showtime stage and perform in front of a live audience and a panel of judges. The groups are scored from a scale of one to ten, with ten being the best. Groups with the highest overall scores will advance and be one step closer to the grand prize.
MasUK Pak Eko!
Adapted from Cash-Ya! Kaya! Two teams challenge each other and compete to see which team can fit the most team members in a common household item.
Katamu Kataku
Adapted from PUROKatatawanan
Cerpen Cerbung
Adapted from Sine Mo'To. Cerpen Cerbung is Showtime's sketch comedy segment, which parodies different topics, originally-written stories and personalities.
Bibir Gemas
Adapted from Ansabe?!
Mini Me
Adapted from Mini Me
Tarung Seru
Adapted from GagamBATTLE. Two people fights on top of a pole fighting like a spider. Whoever falls off the pole loses.
Bayang Bayang Semu
Adapted from HulANINO. Hosts are split to two teams and one of each team's members will try to guess what the teams are trying to act based on their shadows.
