= Chika Jessica =

Indonesian actress (born 1988)

- Born: Sisca Jessica; April 25, 1988 (age 38); Bandung, West Java, Indonesia
- Occupations: Celebrity, Comedian, Presenter

Sisca "Chika" Jessica (born 25 April 1988) is an Indonesian actress best known for her work as a co-host in Hitam Putih Talk show hosted by Deddy Corbuzier. She began her career with a role in a soap opera. In 2009, she starred in the movie Merantau with Iko Uwais and Christine Hakim.

== Filmography ==
Year	Title	Role	Notes
2008	The Tarix Jabrix		
2009	Merantau	Astri	
2012	Bangkit dari Kubur	Trisa	
2012	Dendam dari Kuburan	Agnes	
2013	Get M4rried	Cewek alay	
2013	Slank Nggak Ada Matinya	Penny	
2014	Aku, Kau & KUA	Elisa	
2015	Ngenest	Bidan	
2015	Gue Bukan Pocong	Pocong	
2016	Triangle the Dark Side	Chika	Also as the screenwriter crew

=== Television ===
Year	Title	Role	Notes	Network
2019	It's Showtime Indonesia	Host	Variety Show	MNCTV

=== Saat ini ===
Year	Title	Role	Notes	Network
2021	Manda	Host	Variety My, Seruway	Seruway

== See also ==
- List of Indonesian films
