= Merantau =

2009 Indonesian film directed by Gareth Evans

- Directed by: Gareth Evans
- Written by: Gareth Evans
- Produced by: Ario Sagantoro
- Starring: Iko Uwais; Sisca Jessica; Christine Hakim; Mads Koudal; Laurent Buson; Alex Abbad; Donny Alamsyah; Yayan Ruhian
- Cinematography: Matt Flannery; Dimas Imam Subhono
- Edited by: Gareth Evans
- Music by: Fajar Yuskemal; Aria Prayogi
- Production company: PT. Merantau Films
- Distributed by: SinemArt
- Release date: 6 August 2009 (Indonesia)
- Running time: 134 minutes (Indonesian version); 112 minutes (International version)
- Country: Indonesia
- Languages: Indonesian; English

Merantau, released in some countries as Merantau Warrior, is a 2009 Indonesian martial arts action film written, directed and edited by Gareth Evans, and starring Iko Uwais. The film marked Uwais' debut as an actor and was the first collaboration between director Evans and star Uwais. It also marks the acting debut of Yayan Ruhian, who, along with Uwais, Evans met while shooting for a documentary in Indonesia. It was this documentary which introduced Evans to the martial art of pencak silat.

The film showcases the Minangkabau tradition of "Merantau", a rite of passage where a man leaves his home to pursue a career or gain experience outside of the village, a culture where inheritance is largely matriarchal. It showcases Yuda who leaves his village in hopes of teaching silat in Jakarta, only to be sidetracked as he attempts to save a girl from being kidnapped. The film showcases a style of silat known as silek harimau (tiger silat). It also features actors Donny Alamsyah and Alex Abbad who, along with Uwais and Ruhiyan, would later appear in Evans' subsequent films in The Raid (2011) and The Raid 2 (2014).

Merantau premiered at the Puchon International Fantastic Film Festival in South Korea on 23 July 2009, before being released theatrically on 6 August in Indonesia. It won the Jury Award for Best Film at the inaugural 2010 ActionFest in North Carolina.

== Plot ==
Yuda is a Minangkabau from West Sumatra and an expert in silat. As part of the merantau (journeying) tradition, he leaves his hometown to seek a career. Initially he plans to go to Jakarta and teach silat to children. On a bus, he meets Eric, another silat expert. Eric somberly warns Yuda that the city is quite different from what he is used to, and it will be difficult to make a living teaching silat. (They attend an audition for bodyguards that Eric has heard about. Eric decisively defeats his opponent, winning him the job; he asks Yuda to join him, but Yuda, uncomfortable with the situation, declines. - Indonesian version only)

The apartment where Yuda was meant to stay was torn down, leaving him homeless. The next day, his wallet is stolen by a kid named Adit. Chasing him, Yuda encounters his sister Astri arguing with her boss Johnny. When Johnny begins abusing Astri, Yuda steps in, causing her to get fired. The next day, Yuda sees Astri being beaten by Johnny again. He intervenes, and gets mobbed by Johnny's thugs. He fights them off and flees with Astri, in the process brutally scarring Ratger, Johnny's boss. An enraged Ratger vows to hunt down Astri and Yuda.

Yuda takes Astri and Adit to the construction site where he is staying. Yuda explains why he came to the city and talks about his older brother, who used to always beat him up. Astri explains how her parents abandoned her and Adit a few years ago, and she has been taking care of him ever since.

The next day, Yuda goes to Astri's home to retrieve her savings money. Ambushed by Ratger's thugs, he manages to defeat them all. Meanwhile, Astri and Adit are spotted and chased by several thugs through the streets. Astri helps Adit hide before she is kidnapped. Yuda promises Adit to find his sister. Yuda confronts Johnny's henchmen in his club to learn Ratger's whereabouts.

Yuda arrives at an apartment building as Ratger takes Astri to his room, dispatching a guard to wait downstairs. Yuda enters the elevator and encounters the guard, who turns out to be Eric. Yuda tries to convince him to walk away. Eric is ashamed of what he has become, but feels he has no way out. After a brutal fight in the elevator, Yuda defeats Eric, but spares his life. Ratger rapes Astri and takes her to the parking garage, leaving two guards watching the elevator. As the elevator opens, Eric pushes Yuda to cover before getting gunned down by the guards. Yuda jumps on a car to chase after Ratger and Astri.

At a shipping dock, Ratger puts Astri in a storage container with other women. Yuda fights his way through Ratger's thugs before confronting Ratger and his associate Luc. After a gruelling two-on-one fight, Yuda accidentally causes Luc to impale himself with the crowbar, and subdues Ratger. Yuda frees the women from the container. As Yuda and Astri reunite, Ratger stabs Yuda in the stomach. Yuda kills Ratger, and tells Astri his final wishes before he dies.

Astri reunites with Adit, and the two eventually go to Yuda's hometown and live with Yuda's family. The story ends with Yuda's mother standing in the doorway watching Adit go to school; her perspective changes as she sees Adit as her son, Yuda.

== Cast ==
- Iko Uwais as Yuda
- Sisca Jessica as Astri
- Mads Koudal as Ratger
- Laurent Buson as Luc
- Yusuf Aulia as Adit, Astri's brother
- Alex Abbad as Johni, Astri's pimp
- Yayan Ruhian as Eric
- Christine Hakim as Wulan, Yuda's mother
- Donny Alamsyah as Yayan, Yuda's brother
- Ratna Galih as Ayi

== Release ==
The film premiered at the Puchon International Fantastic Film Festival in South Korea as the opening film of the closing ceremony on 23 July 2009. It was released theatrically on 6 August 2009 in Indonesia. The film made its US debut at the Austin Fantastic Fest on 24 September 2009, where it was nominated for the Audience Award.

It made its Europe debut at the Sitges Film Festival in Spain on 9 October 2009, and in France at the Festival Mauvais Genre on 3 April 2010. It was screened at the inaugural ActionFest on 17 April 2010, where it won the Jury Award for Best Film. The jury included the likes of Chuck Norris, Drew McWeeny of HitFix, Todd Brown of TwitchFilm, Devin Faraci of CHUD, and Colin Geddes of TIFF's Midnight Madness.

=== Critical response ===
Merantau received generally positive reviews from film critics. Cole Abaius of Film School Rejects calls the film a "Mind-exploding action sequences coupled with genuine emotional impact." Harry Knowles of Ain't It Cool opines that the film is "a tremendous martial arts film"; noting it as an "outstanding" film. Moises Chiullan of Hollywood Elsewhere wrote that the film is "one of the more compelling and powerful martial arts films" he has seen.

Andrew Mack, reviewing for Twitch Film, wrote that the film "is the next great martial arts film to come out and one of the best this past decade." Todd Brown, on another review for Twitch Film, praises the film by saying that it "serves very loud notice that Indonesia is back in the action game." Mike Leeder of Impact Magazine expresses his excitement toward the film, saying that it "proves Indonesian action cinema can stand alongside the best of the rest of the world."

=== Accolades ===
Year	Award	Category	Nominee(s)	Result
2009	Austin Fantastic Fest	Audience Award	Merantau	Nominated
2010	ActionFest	Best Film	Merantau	Won
