= Laurent Buson =

French actor

- Born: 10 November 1978 (age 47); Paris, France
- Other name: Lohan
- Occupations: Actor, Martial Artist, Producer
- Spouse: Hye Jeung Choi (2009–present)
- Website: www.z-team.net

Laurent Buson (born 10 November 1978), also known as Lohan, is a French actor, martial artist, action choreographer and film producer.

== Early life ==
Laurent Buson was born in Paris, France. He started martial arts and gymnastic. When he was a teenager he saw a demonstration by the Shaolin monks. After the show he spoke to the head monk who told him that Westerners could not endure the intensity of their training, but this only motivated Lohan to practice harder. Several years later, he entered mainland China and traveled to the Shaolin Monastery.

== Martial arts career ==
Lohan trained at the Shaolin Monastery for one year (2000–2001) under the supervision of Shi Yong Xu. In 2001, he went to the Beijing Sport University to get his degree in Wushu. In 2002, he obtained 1st place in Male Duilian (3 men fight choreography) during the Beijing Sport University "Ranking" competition.

After graduating, Lohan kept on training, coached by Wang Xiao Na from 2003 to 2008. In 2007 he competed at the 5th Hong Kong Wushu International Championship, obtaining 2nd place in Straightsword (Jianshu) and 4th place in Long Fist (Changquan). Lohan was also a student of the Shichahai Sports School (2009), home of the Beijing Wushu Team where he was coached by Liu Qinghua. Lohan lived and trained in China for almost 10 years.

== Film career ==
During his time in China, Lohan worked on several television commercials as well as on various movies such as Silver Hawk.

In June 2003, Lohan formed the Z Team, a foreign martial arts action team based in China.

In 2004, Laurent co-choreographed and starred in the Z Team's first produced short film Duel, and was nominated in 2007 during the Action on Film International Film Festival for Breakout Action Star while Duel received a nomination for Best Action Sequence Martial Arts.

In 2005, Lohan directed and played in the short film Brothers Forever, which was nominated during the 2008 Action on Film International Film Festival for Best Action Sequence Martial Arts Short. Again in 2005, Laurent co-choreographed and co-starred in the epic fantasy short film Fantasy Story, which received in 2007 during the Action on Film International Film Festival nominations for Best Fight Choreography and Best Action Short of the Year. The same year, he also starred in French short film Pre Face.

In 2006, Laurent was the assistant director and co-editor on the action short film The Witness in which he also appears as one of the main characters.

In 2008, Laurent received recognition for his work as a digital compositor on the short film Virtual Vision, which was nominated during the 2008 Action on Film International Film Festival for Best Title Sequence. Again in 2008, Laurent obtained a supporting role in award-winning (Audience Award Honorable Mention at Fantastic Fest 2009 and Best Film at Action Fest 2010) feature film Merantau by director Gareth Evans, in which he played the part of Luc the human trafficker.

In 2010, Laurent produced and starred in action/martial arts feature film The Price of Success directed by Fabien Garcia and set for American and international released in 2011.

Lohan is one of the leading members of the Z Team martial arts action team and member manager of Z Team Films, LLC (film production). He is scheduled to showcase his martial arts skills in the upcoming French feature film Sang Pour Sang and is also set to choreograph American feature film projects Slums 13 and Fuse.
