= Terpaksa menikahi Tuan Muda =

Indonesian drama television series

- Genre: Melodrama; Romance; Revenge
- Created by: Titin Suryani
- Screenplay by: Team Verona
- Directed by: Sanjeev Kumar
- Starring: Christ Laurent; Alisia Rininta; Shanice Margaretha; Leo Consul; Usman Ali; Reza Levi; Alex Rio; Izhar Bima; Rocky Jeff; Annisa Hasim; Gracia Marcilia; Dafina Jamasir
- Theme music composer: Naff
- Opening theme: Terendap Laraku by Naff
- Ending theme: Terendap Laraku by Naff
- Composer: Ary Logam
- Country of origin: Indonesia
- Original language: Indonesian
- No. of seasons: 1
- No. of episodes: 320

Production
- Executive producer: Titin Suryani
- Producer: Titin Suryani
- Production locations: Jakarta, Indonesia
- Cinematography: Mame Shulla
- Editor: Cutting Point Post
- Camera setup: Multi-camera
- Running time: 150 minutes
- Production company: Verona Pictures

Original release
- Network: ANTV
- Release: 9 August 2021 – 26 June 2022

Related
- Aku Titipkan Cinta

Terpaksa Menikahi Tuan Muda (lit. 'Forced to Marry Young Master') is an Indonesian television drama series starring Christ Laurent and Alisia Rininta. It was broadcast on ANTV from 9 August 2021 to 26 June 2022.

The show ended on 26 June 2022. This show was replaced by Aku Titipkan Cinta from 27 June 2022.

== Plot ==
Kinanti, a beautiful girl, is forced to marry Abhimana in place of her half-sister, Sarah. The chain of events began with Herman, Kinanti's father, who needed significant funds to pay off debts and complete a project that had exploded and caught fire. Herman agreed to let Abhimana marry one of his daughters. However, Sarah, who already had a boyfriend, was compelled by Herman and Marissa to marry Abhimana. Just before the wedding was scheduled to take place, she chose to run away with her boyfriend, Bastian, forcing Kinanti to take her place. How will their story unfold?

== Cast ==
=== Main ===
- Christ Laurent as Abhimana Soedirja: Kinanti's husband; Anita's brother; Sarah's ex-fiancée; Raditya's step-brother; Ruslan's son; Nayaka's father. (2021–2022)
- Alisia Rininta as Kinanti Lestari: Abhimana's wife; Sarah's step-sister; Herman and Desi's daughter; Marissa's step-daughter; Angga's ex-lover; Karina's step-daughter and niece; Nayaka's mother. (2021–2022)

=== Recurring ===
- Leo Consul as David: Abhimana's personal assistant; Amanda and Alexandra's ex-fiancée. (2021–2022)
- Shanice Margaretha as Alexandra: David's ex-fiancée; Andrew's wife; Hendra's daughter. (2022)
- Agoye Mahendra as Reno Soedirja: Abhimana's nephew; Anita's son; Arya's father. (2021–2022)
- Dame Aning as Anna Silvia: Andy's daughter; Reno's ex-wife; Nico's lover; Arya's mother. (2021–2022)
- Lenny Charlotte as Martha: Rima's mother; Raditya, Abhimana and Anita's great-grandmother. (2021–2022)
- David Hoffman as Herman Wijaya: Marissa's husband; Desi and Karina's ex-husband; Sarah and Kinanti's father; Keisha's ex-lover; Claudia's ex-fiancée. (2021–2022)
- Puy Brahmantya as Anita Soedirja: Abhimana's sister; Reno's mother; Raditya's step-sister; Ruslan's daughter; Satria's ex-wife. (2021)
- Alessia Cestaro as Anita Soedirja: Abhimana's sister; Reno's mother; Raditya's step-sister; Ruslan's daughter; Satria's ex-wife. (2021–2022)
  - as Delia: Anita's lookalike (2022)
- Shinta Bachir as Marissa: Herman's second wife; Karina's step-sister; Sarah's mother; Kinanti's step-mother. (2021–2022)
- Linda Nirin as Juminten: Soedirja's maid; Ella's mother. (2021–2022)
- Fendy Chow as Andrew: Alexandra's husband. (2022)
- Ahmad Affandy as Satria: Reno's step-father; Anita's ex-husband. (2022)
- Neezha Rais as Friska: Satria's second wife; Reno's step-mother. (2022)
- Gracia Marcilia as Lucy: Kinanti's friend; Mika's mother. (2022)
- Usman Ali as Nayaka Gagah Soedirja: Abhimana and Kinanti's son. (2022)
- Rachel Mikhayla as Bella: Marina's daughter. (2022)
- Kayhan Pieter Vandennoort as Arya Soedirja: Reno and Anna's son. (2022)
- Rheiny Octavia as Bunga (2022)
- Alex Rio as Wily: Tasya's father; Della's husband. (2022)
- Varisha Afsheen as Tasya: Wily and Della's daughter; Nayaka's friend. (2022)
- Viola Khaireen Shazia as Mika: Nayaka's friend; Lucy's daughter. (2022)
- Fath Bayyinah as Della: Wily's wife; Tasya's mother; Kinanti's friend. (2022)
- Melly as Susan: Kinanti's friend. (2022)
- Tiansyah Panjaitan as Stenly: Dita's love-interest. (2022)
- Erlina Sutansyah as Mona (2022)
- Rebecca Tamara as Amanda Aulia: Abhimana and David's ex-fiancée. (2021–2022)
- Titha Rendriana as Alya: Abhimana's ex-fiancée. (2021)
- Elina Joerg as Sarah Amelia: Kinanti's step-sister; Bastian's ex-wife; Abhimana ex-fiancée; Herman and Marissa's daughter; Reno's ex-lover; Karina's step-daughter. (2021–2022)
- Andrew Andika as Kevin: Anita's ex-lover. (2021)
- Ikhsan Saleh as Kevin: Anita's ex-lover. (2021–2022)
- Ayu Dyah Pasha as Rima: Martha's daughter; Abhimana, Anita and Raditya's grandma. (Dead) (2021–2022)
- Dafina Jamasir as Karina: Herman's third wife; Marissa's step-sister; Sarah and Kinanti's step-mother. (2021–2022)
- Reza Levi as Raditya Soedirja: Abhimana and Anita's step-brother; Ruslan and Wulandari's son; Dinda ex-fiancée. (2021–2022)
- Claudio sebagai Andy: Anna's father. (2021–2022)
- Ananda Nathalie as Sindy (2021–2022)
- Feby Fristya as Winda (2021–2022)
- Sonya Pandarmawan as Natasha: Reno's second wife. (2022)
- Faradina Tika as Sandra: Danny's wife. (2022)
- Ferdiyan Ariyadi as Danny: Sandra's husband. (2022)
- Krisna Murti Wibowo as Kuncoro (2022)
- Guntur Nugraha as Rendra (2022)
- Ryan Goutama as Nico: Anna's lover. (2022)
- Aliyah Faizah as Marina: Bella's mother. (2022)
- Celine Laila Panza as Yasmin (2022)
- Joverel Assauqi as Baby Nayaka: Kinanti and Abhimana's son. (2022)
- Aqila Zhufairah Azzuhro as Melati (2022)
- Tiansyah Panjaitan as Bowo: Rani's husband. (2022)
- Unknown as Rani: Bowo's wife. (2022)
- Elkie Kwee as Hendra: Alexandra's father. (Dead) (2022)
- Tyara Vanesha as Ditha (2022)
- Dian Utomo as Carla (2022)
- Maya Yuniar as Ratih (2022)
- Evelyn Aurora as Veronica (2022)
- Fizzabella Bee as Susi (2022)
- Maharani Asmara Dewi as Maharani (2022)
- Kenny Mayang Sari as Dinda: Raditya's ex-fiancée (2022)
- Metta Permadi as Fitri: Amanda's maid; Dodi's wife. (2022)
- Christian Loho as Dodi: Fitri's husband. (2022)
- Hud Filbert as Bastian: Sarah's ex-wife. (2021)
- Imam Farisyah as Angga: Kinanti's ex-lover. (2021)
- Guntur Saputra as Evan: Claudia's ex-lover. (2021)
- Annisa Hasim as Keisha: Herman's ex-lover. (2021)
- Farahdiba Ferreira as Claudia: Herman's ex-fiancée. (2021)
- Adi Sastro as Roland (2021)
- Eno TB as Ella: Soedirja's maid; Juminten's daughter. (2021)
- Darren Rafid Khairan as Bobi: Abhimana's nephew. (2021)
- Alodya Desi as Amel (2021)
- Ismi Iskandar Ingleton as Tania (2021)
- Oland Tri as Johan (2021)
- Shakira Sheldrick as Shakira (2021)
- Afo Nasis as Pasha (2021)
- Izhar Bima as Bima (2021)
- Alex Virky as Akbar (2021)
- Bobbi Teguh as Bobbi (2021)
- Teuku Reka as Reka (2021)
- Yudi Permana Khan as Broto (2021)
- Ali Rozza as Tedjo (2021)
- Sukrie as Dudung (2021)
- Gita Ginezza as Desi Lestari: Herman's first wife; Kinanti's mother. (Dead) (2021)
- Dessy Octora as Wulandari: Ruslan's ex-wife; Raditya's mother. (2021)

== Productions ==
The first promo of this series was released on 4 August 2021.

=== Casting ===
Alisia Rininta to play the role of Kinanti Lestari. Leo Consul was chosen to play David. Agoye Mahendra was selected to play Reno. Elina Joerg joined the cast as Sarah. In August 2021, Titha Rendriana left. In the same month, Rebecca Tamara replaced Titha Rendriana as Alya's new role, namely Amanda (after plastic surgery). In April 2022, Gracia Marcilia were cast to play Lucy.

=== Filming ===
On 17 November 2021, the show completed 100 episodes. The show completed 300 episodes on 6 June 2022.

== Reception ==
On 20 September 2021, is in tenth place with TVR 2.0 and audience share 12.7%. Along with the achievement of the 50th episode, this series managed to achieve the achievement of being the number one series in areas outside Jakarta. On 29 October 2021, it garnered TVR 2.0 and audience share 10.7% impressions occupying fifth position.

== Controversy ==
In December 2021, This series drew protests from a number of volunteers who handled the natural disaster of the eruption of Mount Semeru and also from some residents of Lumajang because it was assumed that it was unethical to have carried out the shooting process in refugee locations for victims affected by the eruption.

== Awards ==
Year	Awards	Category	Nominations	Recipient	Ref
2021	Festival Film Bandung 2021	Best Actor	Christ Laurent	Won	
