= The Hallow =

- Theatrical release poster
- Directed by: Corin Hardy
- Written by: Corin Hardy; Felipe Marino
- Produced by: Joe Neurauter; Felipe Marino
- Starring: Joseph Mawle; Bojana Novakovic; Michael McElhatton; Michael Smiley
- Cinematography: Martijn Van Broekhuizen
- Edited by: Nick Emerson
- Music by: James Gosling
- Production companies: Fantastic Films; Occupant Entertainment
- Distributed by: Entertainment One
- Release dates: 25 January 2015 (Sundance); 10 July 2015 (United Kingdom)
- Running time: 97 minutes
- Countries: United Kingdom; Ireland; United States
- Language: English

The Hallow (originally titled The Woods) is a 2015 supernatural horror film directed by Corin Hardy, written by Hardy and Felipe Marino, and starring Joseph Mawle, Bojana Novakovic, Michael McElhatton, and Michael Smiley. It is a British-Irish co-production filmed in Ireland. It premiered at the 2015 Sundance Film Festival on 25 January 2015.

In the film a conservationist and his family visit an isolated village in Ireland, because he wants to explore a nearby forest. Local legend suggests that the forest is inhabited by hostile fairies, and the family is soon attacked by these fairies.

== Plot ==
Adam Hitchens, a British conservationist specializing in plant and fungal life, his wife Claire, and baby son Finn travel to a remote Irish village surrounded by a large forest. While exploring the forest with Finn, Adam stumbles upon an animal carcass with a strange fungal substance that has burst open the body. Adam takes a sample and returns home with Finn while Claire (in the midst of removing iron bars from the upper exterior of their home) has an encounter with a local called Colm Donnelly who seems unhappy that the family has moved in.

That night, the window in Finn's room is broken while he is sleeping. While the couple suspects the culprit is Colm in an attempt to scare them away, the police arrive and suggest that a bird flew in. The officers inform them of the legend about the surrounding forest—that is inhabited by "The Hallow", a breed of "fairies, banshees and baby stealers". Later, Adam spots strange movement in the woods. The next day Adam and Finn arrive in town to replace the broken window, when they are treated coldly by the villagers who repeat the legend of The Hallow and tell them to put back the iron bars. Colm arrives at the house again, frightening Claire, and warns her to leave before giving her an old book.

On the drive back, Adam's car breaks down, and he discovers the fungus substance has entered the engine of his car. As he investigates the rest of the car, something pushes him into the boot and locks him in. Adam hears Finn crying as the car starts to shake, and he manages to break out through the backseats. He finds Finn unharmed but the car covered in scratch marks. Unnerved, Adam and Finn return home on foot as night falls, and Claire tells them about Colm. Adam tells Claire to call the police and arms himself with a shotgun. The power goes out, and they find the house has been ransacked. They decide to flee to the car, whereupon they are attacked by the creatures the villagers have warned them about. Adam, Claire, and Finn drive away, but the creatures cause them to crash into a ravine, and they retreat back to the house.

While looking out of a keyhole, Adam is stabbed in the eye by a stinger from one of the creatures and realizes that light repels them. Claire and Finn flee into the attic while Adam goes to start the backup generator. The creatures attack Claire and Finn and nearly stab Claire in the eye too, but Adam is able to start the generator and ward the attackers off. The couple barricades the house and locks Finn in a cupboard. They discover the book that Colm gave Claire is filled with information about The Hallow, including their use of changelings. One of The Hallow manages to abduct Finn before his parents can stop it, and Adam breaks his leg, knocking himself unconscious. Claire pursues the creature and Finn into the forest and retrieves him safely from a pond.

Adam sets his broken leg and, upon Claire and Finn's return to the house, begins to suspect that the Finn that Claire rescued is actually a changeling. Claire refuses to believe this, and the couple fight as Claire notices Adam starting to mutate via the fungus injected into him through the stinger. Claire stabs Adam and panics, fleeing into the forest with Finn. Adam soon follows them as his symptoms worsen, and he grows weak around lights. Claire escapes the forest, running to a nearby house for help. Colm is revealed to be the owner, and he sends Claire and Finn away at gunpoint, claiming that The Hallow took his daughter Cora as well. Adam enters The Hallow's nest and retrieves the real Finn from a fully transformed Cora. Claire fends off a group of The Hallow with a camera flash and reunites with Adam, who convinces her that he has the real Finn. They swap babies before Adam is fatally wounded by one of the creatures. The sun rises, forcing the creatures to retreat and destroying the changeling, proving that Adam was right.

Adam dies from his wounds while Claire escapes to the house and cries with the real Finn over Adam's death. Later, a logging company start to cut down the forest, and the fungus substance is revealed to be on several logs being driven away.

== Cast ==
- Joseph Mawle as Adam Hitchens
- Bojana Novakovic as Claire Hitchens
- Michael McElhatton as Colm Donnelly
- Michael Smiley as Garda Davey

== Production ==
=== Development ===
The film was written to segue from a relationship drama into more of a dark fairytale, and the pacing matched this transition. Hardy wanted to touch upon many different subgenres of horror, including body horror and creature feature. Inspirations for the film were Hardy's love for fairytales, Ray Harryhausen (with whom Hardy was close friends), and horror films like The Evil Dead, Alien, and The Thing. It was pitched as "Straw Dogs meets Pan's Labyrinth". Although Hardy is a fan of vampires, werewolves, and zombies, he felt that there were already enough films based around those monsters, and he wanted to do something less overexposed. He decided on using Irish folktales as a base. As a fan of Mawle, Hardy wrote the lead role for him.

=== Filming ===
Shooting took place in Ireland for six weeks. Hardy wanted to keep the shooting "as real as possible". This involved shooting on location in forests and around lakes, including one scene where Hardy wore a wetsuit to shoot from inside a lake. Continuing this theme of realism, Hardy focused on giving the narrative a more rational, scientific base than the traditional magic-based fable. Martijn van Broekhuizen was the cinematographer. van Broekhuizen and Hardy had not worked together previously, but van Broekhuizen was aware of his work. After talking together on Skype, van Broekhuizen was impressed with Hardy's ability to clearly express his vision. van Broekhuizen credited his work on a Dutch film in which he shot complex nighttime scenes in a forest as the reason why he was hired for The Hallow. Shooting took place with an Arri Alexa digital camera, and the lighting was designed to evoke a fairytale atmosphere. Hardy had wanted to shoot on film, but budget limitations prevented this. Hardy characterized the production as having both "good fear" and "bad fear": the good kind inspired them to perform to the best of their ability, and the bad kind caused them to be averse to taking risks. Hardy credited his confidence in the production as raising morale when they were performing long shoots in rural locations.

The creatures were done by British SFX artist John Nolan, whom Hardy sought out in an effort to find what he called the British equivalent to Stan Winston or Rob Bottin. The effects were primarily practical. The creatures were a mix of practical effects and CGI. Although a fan of old-school "man in a rubber suit" effects, Hardy took advantage of modern technology to augment the look of the creatures. In order to make the creatures more unsettling, their limbs were extended using practical effects, as Hardy believed a full-CGI monster would not be scary. This allowed the filmmakers to use on-set lighting to heighten the creepiness. This was inspired in part by Alien. The baby seen in the film is a mix of animatronics and twins that were digitally shot in front of a blue screen. The effects were inspired in part by the 2001 version of Planet of the Apes, which Hardy said "mixed those gritty real environments with the slick performance capture to blur the lines".

== Reception ==
=== Critical response ===
Rotten Tomatoes, a review aggregator, reports that 73% of 56 surveyed critics gave the film a positive review; the average rating is 6.2/10. The site's consensus reads: "Drenched in dark atmosphere and bolstered with some real emotion underneath all the chills, The Hallow suggests a wonderfully horrifying future for director Corin Hardy." It has a score of 65/100 on Metacritic based on 12 reviews.

Geoff Berkshire of Variety wrote, "It takes time for The Hallow to get rolling, but once it reaches a bang-up final act, genre fans could walk out clamoring for a sequel." David Rooney of The Hollywood Reporter wrote, "As first films go, this one is visually energized, dynamically paced and discerning in its cine-literate references. It's also a kickass calling card for Hardy as he moves on to bigger projects." Michael Roffman of Consequence of Sound rated it C− and wrote, "Despite a number of supremely original sequences – one of which involves a car trunk, another a cavernous dwelling – they’re all carried out rather predictably, cinching any warranted tension within seconds."

Fred Topel of Bloody Disgusting rated it 4/5 stars and called for sequels to revisit the film's mythology, which he praised.

According Kit Hawkins, this film is a folk horror film with "postcolonial critiques of Irish gothic conventions".
