= Gareth Evans (filmmaker) =

Welsh filmmaker

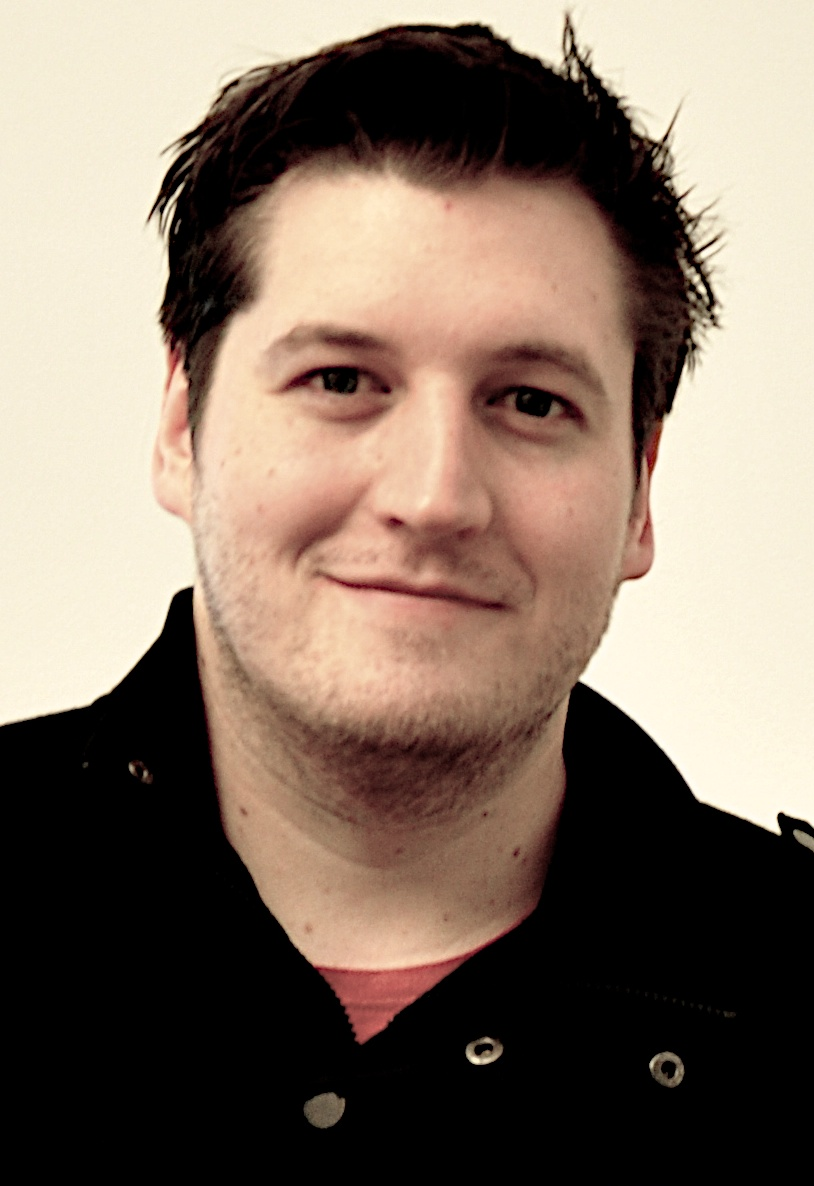
- Evans in 2012
- Born: Gareth Huw Evans; 6 April 1980 (age 46); Hirwaun, Wales
- Education: University of Glamorgan (MA)
- Occupations: Film director, screenwriter, editor, action choreographer
- Years active: 2003–present
- Spouse: Maya Barack-Evans
- Children: 1

Gareth Huw Evans (born 6 April 1980) is a Welsh film director, screenwriter, editor, and action choreographer. He is best known for the Indonesian action crime films Merantau (2009), The Raid (2011), and The Raid 2 (2014), and for bringing the Indonesian martial art of pencak silat into world cinema through these films. He is also known for co-creating, co-writing, co-directing, and executive producing the Sky Atlantic/AMC action crime drama television series Gangs of London (2020–present), alongside Matt Flannery, based on the 2006 video game of the same name.

== Early life ==
Evans was born on 6 April 1980 and raised in Hirwaun, Cynon Valley. He graduated from the University of Glamorgan with an MA in screenwriting.

== Career ==
After directing a small-budget film called Footsteps, Evans was hired as a freelance director for a documentary about the Indonesian martial art pencak silat. He became fascinated with it, and discovered Indonesian martial artist Iko Uwais, who was working as a deliveryman for a phone company. Evans cast Uwais in his 2009 film Merantau. He planned to produce a larger action film, but scaled the production budget down and created an action film called The Raid (2011). After the success of The Raid, the larger action film eventually became the basis for its sequel, The Raid 2 (2014).

In late 2016, Evans started working on his next film, Apostle, which stars Dan Stevens. The film was released by Netflix on 12 October 2018.

In October 2017, TheWrap reported that Evans had pitched his idea for a Deathstroke solo film and is in early talks to write and direct. Evans also passed on directing a Justice League Dark film. However, in April 2020, Evans said that the film had been delayed and that he was no longer actively involved with the project.

In February 2021, it was reported that Evans signed an exclusive deal to produce and direct films for Netflix. His first film under that deal was Havoc, starring Tom Hardy and Forest Whitaker, which was filmed in 2021. After numerous delays due to scheduling reshoots and the SAG-AFTRA strike, the film was released on 25 April 2025. Later that year, Evans completed principal photography on A Colt Is My Passport, a reimagining of the Takashi Nomura 1967 film of the same name.

== Personal life ==
Evans lived in Jakarta, Indonesia with his wife, Maya Barack-Evans, and their daughter, until the family moved back to Wales in 2015.

== Filmography ==
Short film

Year	Title	Director	Writer	Producer	Editor	Notes
2003	Samurai Monogatari	Yes	Yes	Yes	Yes	
2013	Safe Haven	Yes	Yes	No	Yes	Segment of V/H/S/2 (Co-directed with Timo Tjahjanto)
2016	Pre Vis Action	Yes	Yes	Yes	Yes	Also cinematographer

Feature film

Year	Title	Director	Writer	Producer	Editor	Notes
2006	Footsteps	Yes	Yes	Yes	Yes	Role: Porn Den Videographer
2009	Merantau	Yes	Yes	No	Yes	
2011	The Raid	Yes	Yes	Executive	Yes	Also action choreographer
2014	The Raid 2	Yes	Yes	No	Yes	Also action choreographer
2018	Apostle	Yes	Yes	Yes	Yes	Also action design team
2025	Havoc	Yes	Yes	Yes	No	
TBA	A Colt Is My Passport	Yes	No	Yes	No	Post-production

Television

Year	Title	Director	Writer	Creator	Notes
2020	Gangs of London	Yes	Yes	Yes	Episodes 1, 5, and most action sequences

== Awards ==
In November 2011, The Raid won the Midnight Madness Award at the Toronto International Film Festival in 2011.
