= Corin Hardy =

English film director

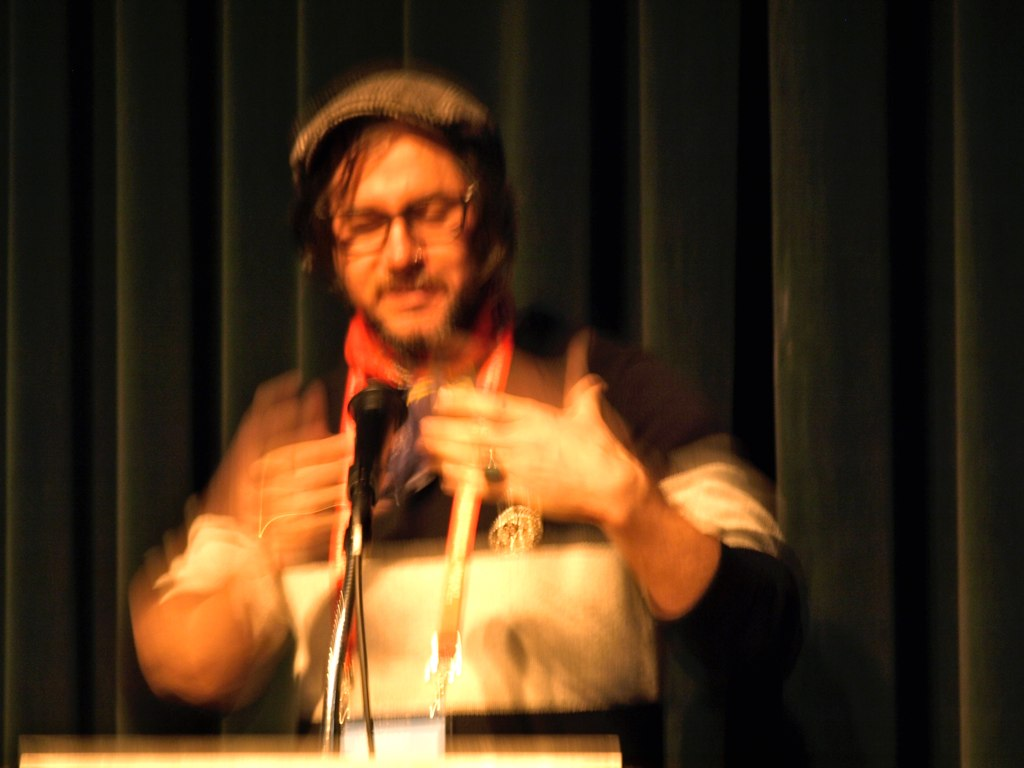
- Corin Hardy at the 2015 Sundance Film Festival in Utah
- Born: 6 January 1975 (age 51)
- Education: Wimbledon College of Arts
- Occupation: Film director
- Years active: 2003–present
- Notable work: The Hallow; The Nun; Whistle
- Website: corinhardy.com

Corin Hardy (born 6 January 1975) is an English filmmaker. He is best known for directing the horror films The Hallow (2015), The Nun (2018) and Whistle (2025).

== Early life ==
Hardy first started as a special effects "monster-maker" in his bike shed at the age of 12, and made Super 8 films with his school friends.

== Career ==
In September 2009, Hardy was set to direct Refuge, from a screenplay by Tom De Ville and produced by Sam Raimi. In 2011, Screen International named him as one of the "Stars of Tomorrow" for filmmakers. He made his directorial debut with the 2015 horror film The Hallow, which he also co-wrote. In December 2014, Hardy was set to direct The Crow (2024), with his The Hallow co-writer Felipe Marino writing the screenplay. By March 2016, he was temporarily removed from the film, before being rehired by June 2016. By June 2018, he exited the film due to disagreements with producers. Hardy called his decision to leave the "hardest decision of all".

He directed the 2018 horror film The Nun, a spin-off of The Conjuring 2 (2016) and the fifth film in The Conjuring Universe. In July 2019, he was set to direct the monster film Arcane for Balboa Productions. In 2020, he directed four episodes of the first series of Gangs of London, a television series produced for Sky Atlantic, before becoming showrunner for the series' 2022 second series, and co-writing the tie-in graphic novel Ghosts. In March 2021, Hardy was set to direct the horror film Every House is Haunted for Netflix. In October 2022, he was set to direct a film adaptation of the comic book series Torso. In 2024, he directed the horror film Whistle (2025). By December 2025, he was no longer attached to Torso.

== Filmography ==
Feature film

Year	Title	Director	Writer	Executive producer
2015	The Hallow	Yes	Yes	No
2018	The Nun	Yes	No	No
2025	Whistle	Yes	No	Yes

Short film

Year	Title	Director	Writer	Notes
2003	Butterfly	Yes	Yes	Also producer, cinematographer and editor
2012	In the Back	Yes	Yes	

Television

Year	Title	Director	Executive Producer	Actor	Notes
2020–2022	Gangs of London	Yes	Yes	Yes	8 episodes; Role: "Fake Shemp"; Also showrunner (Series 2)

Music video

Year	Title	Artist	Ref.
2004	"Somewhere Only We Know"	Keane	
2004	"Bedshaped"	Keane	
2005	"Strangers"	Keane	
2007	"Annie, Let's Not Wait"	Guillemots	
2007	"She Is the New Thing"	The Horrors	
2009	"Warrior's Dance"	The Prodigy	
2009	"Pencil Full of Lead"	Paolo Nutini	
2010	"God and Satan"	Biffy Clyro	
2011	"Busy"	Olly Murs	
2011	"Heart Skips a Beat"	Olly Murs	
2012	"Watchtower"	Devlin	
2013	"Losing Sleep"	John Newman	
2019	"Cthulhu"	Gunship	

== Bibliography ==
Year	Title	Notes
2022	A Gangs of London Story: Ghosts	Co-written with Rowan Athale; illustrated by Ferenc Nothof
