= 2021 Indonesian Film Festival =

2021 Indonesian film awards

41st Indonesian Film Festival
- Date: 10 November 2021
- Site: Assembly Hall, Jakarta Convention Center; Jakarta, Indonesia
- Hosted by: Tissa Biani; Prilly Latuconsina; Angga Yunanda; Jefri Nichol

Highlights
- Best Picture: Photocopier
- Most awards: Photocopier (12)
- Most nominations: Photocopier (17)

Television coverage
- Network: Kompas TV; YouTube
- Duration: 2 hours, 50 minutes

The 41st Indonesian Film Festival ceremony, presented by the Indonesian Film Board and Ministry of Education, Culture, Research, and Technology, honored the achievement in Indonesian cinema released from 1 October 2020 to 31 August 2021. The ceremony was held on 10 November 2021 at the Assembly Hall, Jakarta Convention Center, Jakarta, Indonesia, and presented by actors Tissa Biani, Prilly Latuconsina, Angga Yunanda and Jefri Nichol. Coinciding with Heroes' Day, President Joko Widodo awarded the Father of Indonesian Cinema, Usmar Ismail posthumously as a National Hero of Indonesia.

Crime mystery film Photocopier won a total of twelve awards, including Best Picture. Other winners included Ali & Ratu Ratu Queens and Preman with two, Ahasveros, The Heartbreak Club, Invisible Hopes, Nussa, The Sea Calls for Me, Three Faces In The Land Of Sharia, Yuni with one.

== Winners and nominees ==
The nominations were announced on 10 October 2021 and aired on Vidio and YouTube. Four categories – Favorite Film, Favorite Actor, Favorite Actress, and Best Film Critic – were added, which the former three were voted by audience. Photocopier led all nominees with seventeen nominations; Ali & Ratu Ratu Queens came in second with sixteen.

=== Awards ===
Winners are listed first, highlighted in boldface, and indicated with a double dagger (‡).

**Best Picture**: **Photocopier – Adi Ekatama and Ajish Dibyo, producers**‡; Ali & Ratu Ratu Queens – Muhammad Zaidi and Meiske Taurisia, producers; Bete's Love – Muspita Leni Lolang, producer; Bidadari Mencari Sayap – Deddy Mizwar, producer; Paranoia – Mira Lesmana, producer; Preman – Randolph Zaini and Ryan Ricardo, producers; Yuni – Ifa Isfansyah and Chand Parwez Servia, producers	**Best Director**: **Wregas Bhanuteja – Photocopier**‡; Aria Kusumadewa – Bidadari Mencari Sayap; Kamila Andini – Yuni; Lucky Kuswandi – Ali & Ratu Ratu Queens; Randolph Zaini – Preman; Riri Riza – Paranoia
**Best Actor**: **Chicco Kurniawan – Photocopier as Amin**‡; Deddy Mizwar – Sejuta Sayang Untuknya as Aktor Sagala; Iqbaal Ramadhan – Ali & Ratu Ratu Queens as Ali; Jefri Nichol – Jakarta, City of Dreamers as Dom; Khiva Iskak – Preman as Sandi; Reza Rahadian – Layla Majnun as Qais/Majnun	**Best Actress**: **Arawinda Kirana – Yuni as Yuni**‡; Hana Prinantina Malasan – Bete's Love as Bete; Nirina Zubir – Paranoia as Dina; Shenina Cinnamon – Photocopier as Suryani; Wulan Guritno – Jakarta, City of Dreamers as Pinkan
**Best Supporting Actor**: **Jerome Kurnia – Photocopier as Tariq**‡; Dimas Aditya – Yuni as Damar; Giulio Parengkuan – Photocopier as Rama; Kiki Narendra – Preman as Teacher; Muzakki Ramdhan – Preman as Pandu	**Best Supporting Actress**: **Marissa Anita – Ali & Ratu Ratu Queens as Mia**‡; Asmara Abigail – Yuni as Suci; Asri Welas – Ali & Ratu Ratu Queens as Biyah; Dea Panendra – Photocopier as Anggun; Djenar Maesa Ayu – Bete's Love as Mama Clara
**Best Original Screenplay**: **Photocopier – Wregas Bhanuteja**‡; Ali & Ratu Ratu Queens – Gina S. Noer; Bete's Love – Titien Wattimena and Lina Nurmalina; Preman – Randolph Zaini; Yuni – Kamila Andini and Prima Rusdi	**Best Adapted Screenplay**: **The Heartbreak Club – Gea Rexy, Bagus Bramanti and Charles Gozali**‡; Asih 2 – Lele Laila; Generasi 90an: Melankolia – M. Irfan Ramli; Layla Majnun – Alim Sudio
**Best Cinematography**: **Photocopier – Gunnar Nimpuno**‡; Ali & Ratu Ratu Queens – Batara Goempar; Bete's Love – Roy Lolang; Layla Majnun – Anggi Frisca; Nona – Yudi Datau	**Best Editing**: **Photocopier – Ahmad Yuniardi**‡; Ali & Ratu Ratu Queens – Aline Jusria; Bete's Love – Wawan I. Wibowo and Liliek Subagyo; Jakarta, City of Dreamers – Arifin Cu'unk and Panca Arka Ardiarja; Yuni – Cesa David Luckmansyah
**Best Sound**: **Photocopier – Sutrisno and Satrio Budiono**‡; Ali & Ratu Ratu Queens – Yusuf Patawari, Wahyu Tri Purnomo and Pat O'Leary; Asih 2 – Aria Prayogi and Suhadi; Paranoia – Aria Prayogi; Yuni – Sutrisno and Wahyu Tri Purnomo	**Best Visual Effects**: **Preman – Bintang Adi Perdana**‡; Ali & Ratu Ratu Queens – Rivai Chen; Asih 2 – Haris Reggy; Generasi 90an: Melankolia – Keliek Wicaksono; Layla Majnun – Capluk; Photocopier – Stefanus Binawan Utama; Yuni – Nara Dipa
**Best Original Score**: **Photocopier – Yennu Ariendra**‡; Ali & Ratu Ratu Queens – Mar Galo and Ken Jenie; Bete's Love – Thoersi Argeswara; Layla Majnun – Andi Rianto; Yuni – Mar Galo and Ken Jenie	**Best Original Song**: **"Di Bawah Langit Raksasa" from Photocopier – Music and Lyrics by Mian Tiara; Performed by Mian Tiara featuring Shenina Cinnamon and Dea Panendra**‡; "Doa" from Bete's Love – Music and Lyrics by Oscar Lolang and Titien Wattimena; Performed by Oscar Lolang; "Hujan Bulan Juni" from Yuni – Umar Muslim; sound poetry by Sapardi Djoko Damono; "Never Look Back" from Ali & Ratu Ratu Queens – Music and Lyrics by Bam Mastro; Performed by Aurora Ribero; "On My Own" from Ali & Ratu Ratu Queens – Music and Lyrics by Iqbaal Ramadhan and Tarapti Ikhtiar Rinrin; Performed by Svmmerdose
**Best Art Direction**: **Photocopier – Dita Gambiro**‡; Ali & Ratu Ratu Queens – Eros Eflin and Roxy Martinez; Bete's Love – Okie Yoga Pratama; Layla Majnun – Tepan Kobain and Angga Prasetyo; Yuni – Budi Riyanto Karung	**Best Costume Design**: **Photocopier – Fadillah Putri Yunidar**‡; Ali & Ratu Ratu Queens – Karin Wijaya; Bete's Love – Gemailla Gea Geriantiana; Layla Majnun – Aldie Harra; A Perfect Fit – Rinaldi Fikri; Yuni – Hagai Pakan
**Best Makeup**: **Preman – Novie Ariyanti**‡; Ali & Ratu Ratu Queens – Marshya D. Martha; Asih 2 – Maria Margaretha Earlane; Layla Majnun – Rinie May and Cherry Wirawan; Photocopier – Astrid Sambudiono; Yuni – Eba Sheba	**Best Live Action Short Film**: **The Sea Calls for Me – Tumpal Tampubolon, director; Mandy Marahimin, producer**‡; Makassar Is a City for Football Fans – Khozy Rizal, director; Khozy Rizal, John Badalu and Bruno Smadja, producers (Special Jury Prize); Dear to Me – Monica Vanesa Tedja, director; Astrid Saerong and Felix Schwegler, producers; Sedina – Bertrand Valentino, director; Rangga Fadhil M.S, producer; West Love – M. Reza Fahriyansyah, director; Yulia Evina Bhara, Riski Rama Bernat, Wimba Hinu Satama, Said Nurhidayat, Amerta Kusuma and Annisa Adjam, producers
**Best Documentary Feature**: **Invisible Hopes – Lamtiar Simorangkir, director/producer**‡; Catharina Leimena: Show Must Go On – Patar Simatupang, director/producer; The Flame – Afran Sabran, director; Gita Fara, producer; Kemarin – Upie Guava, director; Dendi Reynaldo, producer; Parherek – Onny Kresnawan, director; Ria Novida Telaumbanua, producer	**Best Documentary Short Film**: **Three Faces In The Land Of Sharia – Davi Abdullah, director; Masridho Rambey, producer**‡; Different Touch In Batik – I Made Suniartika, director; Lila Rosanti, producer; Love Birth Live – Mahatma Putra, director; Natasha May, producer; Noken Rahim Kedua – Adi Sumunar, director; Yulika Anastasia Indrawati, producer; Scene From The Unseen (Merupa) – Ari Aristo, director; Mandy Marahimin, producer
**Best Animated Feature Film**: **Nussa – Bony Wirasmono, director; Ricky "Sapoy" Manoppo and Anggia Kharisma, producers**‡; Adit Sopo Jarwo the Movie – Hanung Bramantyo and Eki N.F, directors; Manoj Punjabi, producer; Riki Rhino – Erwin Budiono, director; Lucki Lukman Hakim and Genesia Timotius, producers	**Best Animated Short Film**: **Ahasveros – Bobby Fernando, director; Kemal Hasan, Salima Hakim and Yohanes Merci, producers**‡; Black Winter – Noviandra Santosa, director/producer; Splish Splash – Andra Fembriarto, director/producer; Malam Jumawut 2 – Yudhatama, director; Amin Wibawa, producer; Timeline – Dimas Surya, director; Indysky, producer
**Best Film Critic** **(Tanete Pong Masak Award)**: **Kukuh Yudha Karnanta for Faculty of Humanities Airlangga University – "Going Gaga Kejahanaman: Martabat dan Pandangan Dunia Perempuan Tanah Jahanam"**‡; Aulia Adam for Tirto – "Ali & Ratu Ratu Queens: Keluarga Nuklir dan Jejak 'American Dreams'" (Special Jury Prize); Adrian Jonathan Pasaribu for Cinema Poetica – "Dear to Me: Seperti Rusa, Rindu Harus Dibayar Duka"; Julita Pratiwi for Cinema Poetica – "X&Y: Hiruk Pikuk Film Vertikal"; Miftachul Arifin and Agustinus Dwi Nugroho for Montasefilm – "Asih 2: Cermin Horor Kontemporer"	**Lifetime Achievement Award**: **Jajang C. Noer**

=== Audience Awards ===
**Favorite Film** **(Djamaluddin Malik Award)**: **Ali & Ratu Ratu Queens**
**Favorite Actor** **(Bambang Irawan Award)**: **Angga Yunanda**	**Favorite Actress** **(Chitra Dewi Award)**: **Prilly Latuconsina**

=== Films with multiple nominations and awards ===
Films that received multiple nominations
Nominations	Film
17	Photocopier
16	Ali & Ratu Ratu Queens
14	Yuni
10	Bete's Love
8	Layla Majnun
8	Preman
4	Asih 2
4	Paranoia
3	Jakarta, City of Dreamers
2	Bidadari Mencari Sayap
2	Generasi 90an: Melankolia

Films that received multiple awards
Awards	Film
12	Photocopier
2	Ali & Ratu Ratu Queens
2	Preman
