= List of 2022 box office number-one films in Indonesia =

This is a list of films which placed number one at the weekend box office for the year 2022 in Indonesia with the weekly admissions.

== Number-one films ==
†	This implies the highest-grossing movie of the year.

#	Weekend end date	Film	Weekly admissions	Weekend openings in the Top 10	Ref.
1	9 January 2022	Spider-Man: No Way Home	580,226	—	
2	16 January 2022	Makmum 2	558,092	Dear Nathan: Thank You Salma (#2); Scream (#4); Kadet 1947 (#9); Trah 7 (#10)	
3	23 January 2022	Dear Nathan: Thank You Salma	318,254	Merindu Cahaya de Amstel (#3); Teluh (#6); Nightmare Alley (#8)	
4	30 January 2022	Merindu Cahaya de Amstel	169,599	Antlers (#5); Ben & Jody (#6); Sword Art Online Progressive: Aria of a Starless Night (#7)	
5	6 February 2022	Kukira Kau Rumah	673,578	Moonfall (#4)	
6	13 February 2022	Kukira Kau Rumah	1,157,468	Death on the Nile (#2); The 355 (#3)	
7	20 February 2022	Kukira Kau Rumah	274,935	Uncharted (#2); Pelangi Tanpa Warna (#9)	
8	27 February 2022	Uncharted	195,186	Garis Waktu (#3); Ambo Nai Sopir Andalan (#6)	
9	6 March 2022	The Batman	889,245	—	
10	13 March 2022	The Batman	546,933	Iblis dalam Kandungan (#2); Marry Me (#5)	
11	20 March 2022	Jujutsu Kaisen 0	500,849	Ambulance (#4); The Other Side (#6); Marley (#7)	
12	27 March 2022	Jujutsu Kaisen 0	215,331	The Lost City (#3); Umma (#7); Hayya 2: Hope, Dream & Reality (#8); Baby Blues (#9)	
13	3 April 2022	Morbius	478,648	Before Night Falls (#2); The Bad Guys (film) (#8)	
14	10 April 2022	Sonic the Hedgehog 2	264,873	The Contractor (#5); I Need You Baby (#7)	
15	17 April 2022	Fantastic Beasts: The Secrets of Dumbledore	710,503	Walking Dead: Tomate (#6); Tutuge (#7)	
16	24 April 2022	Fantastic Beasts: The Secrets of Dumbledore	284,920	Oma, The Demonic (#5); The Unbearable Weight of Massive Talent (#6); Dog (#9)	
17	1 May 2022	KKN di Desa Penari †	315,486	Kuntilanak 3 (#3); Gara-Gara Warisan (#7)	
18	8 May 2022	KKN di Desa Penari †	2,697,593	Doctor Strange in the Multiverse of Madness (#2)	
19	15 May 2022	KKN di Desa Penari †	2,871,921	—	
20	22 May 2022	KKN di Desa Penari †	2,015,000	Cinta Subuh (#4); Srimulat: Hil yang Mustahal (#6); Firestarter (#7)	
21	29 May 2022	KKN di Desa Penari †	767,578	Top Gun: Maverick (#2); The Doll 3 (#3); Mengejar Surga (#8)	
22	5 June 2022	Top Gun: Maverick	708,865	Missing Home (#4); The Roundup (#8); Rumah Kuntilanak (#10)	
23	12 June 2022	Jurassic World Dominion	1,450,831	Gatotkaca (#5)	
24	19 June 2022	Jurassic World Dominion	1,030,276	Naga Naga Naga (#5); Broker (#8); See for Me (#9); Gunpowder Milkshake (#10)	
25	26 June 2022	Missing Home	518,285	Cemara's Family 2 (#3); The Black Phone (#5); My Sassy Girl (#6); Everything Everywhere All at Once (#8)	
26	3 July 2022	Minions: The Rise of Gru	1,079,992	Rumah 3 Warna (#6); Madu Murni (#10)	
27	10 July 2022	Thor: Love and Thunder	2,272,914	—	
28	17 July 2022	Thor: Love and Thunder	1,101,977	Ivanna (#2)	
29	24 July 2022	Ivanna	1,142,430	Ghost Writer 2 (#2); Way Down (#5); Between Us (#10)	
30	31 July 2022	Ivanna	671,999	DC League of Super-Pets (#4); The Sacred Riana 2 (#6); Bukan Cinderella (#7)	
31	7 August 2022	Satan's Slaves 2: Communion	2,425,000	—	
32	14 August 2022	Satan's Slaves 2: Communion	2,280,041	Jo Sahabat Sejati (#7); Tumbal Hitam: Darah Anak Melik (#9)	
33	21 August 2022	Satan's Slaves 2: Communion	1,128,101	Sayap-Sayap Patah (#2); 12 Cerita Glen Anggara (#3); Nope (film) (#4)	
34	28 August 2022	Sayap-Sayap Patah	922,429	Stealing Raden Saleh (#2); Beast (#4); Kamu Tidak Sendiri (#6); Laal Singh Chaddha (#7)	
35	4 September 2022	Sayap-Sayap Patah	850,845	Mumun (#3); Emergency Declaration (#5); Jodohku Yang Mana? - Molulo 2 (#9)	
36	11 September 2022	Miracle in Cell No. 7	1,150,346	Mendarat Darurat (#6)	
37	18 September 2022	Miracle in Cell No. 7	2,395,510	Lara Ati (#4); Noktah Merah Perkawinan (#6); Till Death (#9)	
38	25 September 2022	Miracle in Cell No. 7	1,197,790	One Piece Film: Red (#2); Jailangkung: Sandekala (#3); Avatar (re-release) (#4); Gendut? Siapa Takut (#8)	
39	2 October 2022	Jailangkung: Sandekala	622,762	Smile (#5); Jagat Arwah (#6); Ticket to Paradise (#7); Until Tomorrow (#9)	
40	9 October 2022	Pamali	430,354	—	
41	16 October 2022	The Womb	350,178	Kalian Pantas Mati (#3); Halloween Ends (#5)	
42	23 October 2022	Black Adam	996,762	—	
43	30 October 2022	Black Adam	622,120	Qodrat (#2); Crazy Stupid Love (#6)	
44	6 November 2022	Qodrat	689,052	Perempuan Bergaun Merah (#3); Natiti: Romansa Danau Toba (#5)	
45	13 November 2022	Black Panther: Wakanda Forever	1,953,987	The Devil's Light (#5)	
46	20 November 2022	Black Panther: Wakanda Forever	1,326,693	Sri Asih (#2); The Menu (#6); Uti Deng Keke (#8); Pesantren (#9)	
47	27 November 2022	Black Panther: Wakanda Forever	555,325	Keramat 2: Caruban Larang (#2); Tegar (#6); She Said (#9)	
48	4 December 2022	Qorin	390,189	Violent Night (#6); 2045 Apa Ada Cinta (#10)	
49	11 December 2022	Qorin	469,890	Like & Share (#5)	
50	18 December 2022	Avatar: The Way of Water	1,592,394	Decibel (#3)	
51	25 December 2022	Avatar: The Way of Water	2,358,693	Check the Store Next Door 2 (#2); Tumbal Kanjeng Iblis (#3); Whitney Houston: I Wanna Dance with Somebody (#7)	
52	1 January 2023	Avatar: The Way of Water	1,601,943	Argantara (#3); Puss in Boots: The Last Wish (#5); Shotgun Wedding (#7)	

== Highest-grossing films ==
International film Indonesian film

Highest-grossing films of 2022 (In year release)
Rank	Title	Total admissions
1	KKN di Desa Penari	9,373,628
2	Satan's Slaves 2: Communion	6,391,982
3	Doctor Strange in the Multiverse of Madness	6,214,148
4	Miracle in Cell No. 7	5,852,916
5	Black Panther: Wakanda Forever	4,270,013
6	Thor: Love and Thunder	4,023,149
7	Avatar: The Way of Water	3,951,087
8	Jurassic World Dominion	3,252,626
9	Missing Home	2,886,121
10	Ivanna	2,793,775

== See also ==
- List of highest-grossing films in Indonesia

Preceded by 2021	2022	Succeeded by 2023
