= List of 2021 box office number-one films in Indonesia =

This is a list of films which placed number one at the weekend box office for the year 2021 in Indonesia with the weekly admissions.

== Number-one films ==
†	This implies the highest-grossing movie of the year.

#	Weekend end date	Film	Weekly admissions	Weekend openings in the Top 10	Ref.
1	10 January 2021	Demon Slayer: Kimetsu no Yaiba – The Movie: Mugen Train	360,000	—	
2	17 January 2021	Alvin and the Chipmunks: The Road Chip	41,993	—	
3	24 January 2021	Asih 2	16,116	—	
4	31 January 2021	Alvin and the Chipmunks: The Road Chip	3,174	—	
5	7 February 2021	Kajeng Kliwon	10,786	—	
6	14 February 2021	De Toeng: Misteri Ayunan Nenek	12,727	—	
7	21 February 2021	De Toeng: Misteri Ayunan Nenek	9,327	—	
8	28 February 2021	De Toeng: Misteri Ayunan Nenek	1,134	—	
9	7 March 2021	Raya and the Last Dragon	72,582	The Hunt (#2)	
10	14 March 2021	Raya and the Last Dragon	61,753	Saidjah dan Adinda (#6)	
11	21 March 2021	Raya and the Last Dragon	43,208	Bisikan Arwah Mantan (#2); Ayudia dan Jalan Pulangnya (#4)	
12	28 March 2021	Godzilla vs. Kong	381,092	Titisan Setan 2 (#3)	
13	4 April 2021	Wonder Woman 1984	517,389	Jangan Sendirian (#5)	
14	11 April 2021	Godzilla vs. Kong	166,109	The Box (#3); Villa Angker Lembang (#8); Di Antara Mendung dan Kabutnya Kota Poso (#10)	
15	18 April 2021	Mortal Kombat	290,236	—	
16	25 April 2021	Mortal Kombat	189,133	Pulau Plastik (#6)	
17	2 May 2021	Stand by Me Doraemon 2	570,000	Nobody (#3)	
18	9 May 2021	Mortal Kombat	43,579	—	
19	16 May 2021	Mortal Kombat	130,737	Tarian Lengger Maut (#2); Terima Kasih Emak, Terima Kasih Abah (#3); Dear Imamku (#4)	
20	23 May 2021	Tarian Lengger Maut	112,654	Those Who Wish Me Dead (#2); Kuyang the Movie (#3)	
21	30 May 2021	A Quiet Place Part II	552,538	Cruella (#2); Spiral (#3); Josee, the Tiger and the Fish (#6)	
22	6 June 2021	The Conjuring: The Devil Made Me Do It	858,660	Gas Kuy (#8)	
23	13 June 2021	The Conjuring: The Devil Made Me Do It	680,390	Spirit Untamed (#4); Arumi, Night is Blue (#10)	
24	20 June 2021	F9	1,163,361	—	
25	27 June 2021	F9	438,931	—	
26	4 July 2021	F9	222,827	—	
27–36	11 July 2021 – 12 September 2021	Indonesian cinemas closed and box office reporting suspended due to the COVID-19 pandemic			
37	19 September 2021	Black Widow	67,982	The Suicide Squad (#2)	
38	26 September 2021	Shang-Chi and the Legend of the Ten Rings	392,872	—	
39	3 October 2021	No Time to Die	340,608	—	
40	10 October 2021	No Time to Die	312,054	Jungle Cruise (#3); Zerre Pendekar Ufuk Timur (#5)	
41	17 October 2021	No Time to Die	169,964	Dune (#3)	
42	24 October 2021	Shang-Chi and the Legend of the Ten Rings	192,831	Nussa (#4); Halloween Kills (#5); Free Guy (#6)	
43	31 October 2021	The Medium	150,000	Roh Mati Paksa (#7)	
44	7 November 2021	The Medium	250,000	Last Night in Soho (#4); Bisikan Jenazah (#8)	
45	14 November 2021	Eternals	1,150,213	Paranoia (#3); Pintu Surga Terakhir (#6)	
46	21 November 2021	Eternals	688,339	Venom: Let There Be Carnage (#2); Losmen Bu Broto (#4); Cinta Bete (#9)	
47	28 November 2021	Venom: Let There Be Carnage	593,566	Yowis Ben 3 (#3); Encanto (#4); Kadet 1947 (#6); My Hero Academia: World Heroes' Mission (#7)	
48	5 December 2021	Eternals	149,381	Vengeance Is Mine, All Others Pay Cash (#5); Akhirat: A Love Story (#7)	
49	12 December 2021	Yowis Ben 3	84,013	Yuni (#4); West Side Story (#7); Vidkill (#9)	
50	19 December 2021	Spider-Man: No Way Home †	2,805,180	Yowis Ben Finale (#2); House of Gucci (#4)	
51	26 December 2021	Spider-Man: No Way Home †	2,654,659	The King's Man (#2); The Matrix Resurrections (#4); Teka-Teki Tika (#5); Sepeda Presiden (#9)	
52	2 January 2022	Spider-Man: No Way Home †	2,374,140	Resident Evil: Welcome to Raccoon City (#2); Makmum 2 (#3); Backstage (#6); Clifford the Big Red Dog (#9); Ron's Gone Wrong (#10)	

== Highest-grossing films ==
International film Indonesian film

Highest-grossing films of 2021 (In year release)
Rank	Title	Total admissions
1	Spider-Man: No Way Home	5,459,839
2	Eternals	2,413,449
3	The Conjuring: The Devil Made Me Do It	1,915,177
4	F9	1,825,119
5	Shang-Chi and the Legend of the Ten Rings	1,542,659
6	Venom: Let There Be Carnage	1,491,382
7	A Quiet Place Part II	1,247,354
8	No Time to Die	1,169,351
9	Godzilla vs. Kong	984,214
10	Mortal Kombat	828,001

== See also ==
- List of highest-grossing films in Indonesia

Preceded by 2020	2021	Succeeded by 2022
