= Syifa Hadju =

Indonesian actress and singer

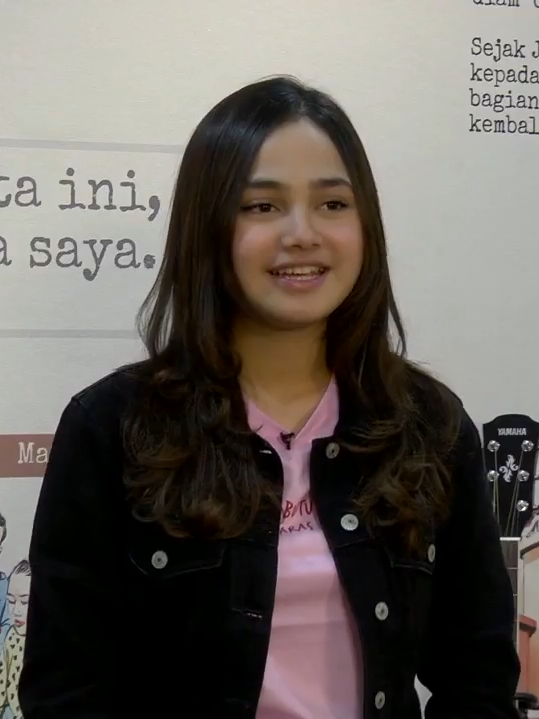
- Syifa Hadju in 2020
- Born: Syifa Safira Nuraisah; July 13, 2000 (age 26); Jakarta, Indonesia
- Occupations: Celebrity; Singer
- Years active: 2014–present
- Spouse: El Rumi (2026)
- Awards: See lists
- Musical career
- Genre: Pop
- Instrument: Vocal
- Labels: Trinity Optima Production; RANS Music; MD; Universal

Syifa Safira Nuraisah (born 13 July 2000), also known as Syifa Hadju, is an Indonesian actress and singer. She gained widespread recognition for her role in the series Mermaid in Love.

== Early life ==
Syifa Safira Nuraisah was born on 13 July 2000 in Jakarta, Indonesia. She is the first of three children of Andre Ariyantho and Shendy Hadju. Syifa Hadju has two younger sisters, Sherina and Manda.

== Career ==
Nuraisyah started using Syifa Hadju as a stage name, adopting her mother's clan name from Gorontalo as her surname.

She began her career as an actress in 2014. She appeared in the soap opera Bintang di Langit. In the same year, she also played roles in the soap operas Catatan Hati Seorang Istri and Aisyah Putri The Series: Jilbab In Love. In addition to soap operas, she also played a role in several television films.

Syifa Hadju made her big-screen debut in 2016. She had the opportunity to act in the film Beauty and the Best, produced by MD Pictures. Her career soared even further when she starred in the soap opera Mermaid in Love, which continued into its second season, ''Mermaid in Love 2 Dunia.

In 2019, Syifa Hadju had the opportunity to play the lead role in The Way I Love You, directed by Rudi Aryanto. She also took part in the film titled Glorious Days, directed by Riri Riza as Mia after undergoing the casting process four times. Later, Syifa Hadju was involved in one of the Danur film series, Danur 3: Sunyaruri, where she played the character of Raina. This film marked her debut in the horror genre.

In addition to her acting career, Syifa Hadju also ventured into singing. She first sang in 2016 for a song titled "Aladin & Putri Yasmin," which was part of the soundtrack for the soap opera Aladin & Putri Yasmin. Her first single, "Jangan Pernah Berubah," was released in 2018. The song was written by Melly Goeslaw, who was the first person to encourage Syifa Hadju to try singing.

In 2020, Syifa Hadju starred in the SCTV mini-series Magic Tumbler, which continued for three seasons. In the same year, she acted alongside senior actor Deddy Mizwar in the Disney+ Hotstar film Sejuta Sayang Untuknya. She also appeared in several web series produced by MD Entertainment. One of the popular web series is Kisah untuk Geri, which was adapted from the novel, Kisah untuk Geri, authored by Erisca Febriani. In that series, Syifa Hadju also lent her voice together with Angga Yunanda for the song "Cinta Hebat." At the same year, Syifa Hadju released a single titled "Setia atau Bodoh" in 2020, which was also released by MD Music.

== Filmography ==
=== Film ===
Acting role
Year	Title	Role	Notes
2016	Beauty and the Best	Upi	
2017	Selebgram	Cello	
2017	A: Aku, Benci, & Cinta	Tara	
2017	Ayat-Ayat Cinta 2	Fatimah	
2019	The Way I Love You	Senja	
2019	Bebas	Mia	
2019	Danur 3: Sunyaruri	Raina	
2020	Toko Barang Mantan	Sayang	
2020	Sejuta Sayang Untuknya	Gina Putri Sagala	
2021	Till Death Do Us Part	Vanesha Humaira	
2022	Jailangkung: Sandekala	Nicky	
2022	Ayo Putus	Alma Amriliazzia	
2023	Bismillah Kunikahi Suamimu	dr. Cathelyn Gilia	
2023	200 Pounds Beauty	Juwita Lestari/Angelica	
2023	Catatan Si Boy	Nuke	
2023	Mohon Doa Restu	Mel	
2024	Ayo Balikan	Alma Amriliazzia	
2024	Dinda	Dinda Kamalia Putri	

=== Television ===
Acting role
Year	Title	Role	Notes
2014	Bintang di Langit	Zetha	Debut work
2014	TV Movie	Yasmine	Episode: "Tentang Anak Kita"
2014	Catatan Hati Seorang Istri	Nina Bramantyo	
2014–2015	Aisyah Putri The Series: Jilbab In Love	Ana	
2016	Aladin & Putri Yasmin	Putri Yasmin	
2016	Go BMX 2	Ulfa	
2016	Mermaid in Love	Maya	
2016–2017	Mermaid in Love 2 Dunia	Mytha	
2017	Dear Nathan the Series	Salma Alvira	
2018	Ada Dua Cinta	Medina	
2019	Kampung Atas Kampung Bawah	Stella	
2019	Jangan Minta Jatuh Cinta	Rara	Miniseries
2020	Magic Tumbler	Olive	Miniseries
2020	Magic Tumbler Season 2	Olive	Miniseries
2020	Magic Tumbler Season 3	Olive	Miniseries
2020	The Friend Book	Seyla	Miniseries
2020	Sisi Lensa	Aluna	Miniseries
2020	Malapataka	Tara	Miniseries; Episode: "Mirror Mirror on The Wall"
2020	Malapataka	Dara	Miniseries; Episode: "Invitation"
2021	Kisah untuk Geri	Dinda Kamalia Putri	Miniseries
2021	Teluk Alaska	Anastasya Mysha	Miniseries
2022	17 Selamanya	Anjani/Dawai Kirana	Miniseries
2023	Bidadari Surgamu	Angel	
2023	Princess & the Boss	Keira Wijaya	Miniseries
2024–2025	Saleha	Saleha Darmawan	
2024–2025	Saleha	Arini Sastrohadi	

==== Television film ====
- Tomato Couple (2014)
- Lope Mermaid in Love (2016)
- Bubarnya Geng Jomblo (2017)
- Pacar 30 Hari (2017)
- Cinta Stuck di Food Truck (2017)
- Ramadhan I Miss You (2017)
- Crazy Angel is My Idol (2017)
- Makhluk Manis di Kostan Depan (2017)
- Cinta Turun dari Gigi ke Hati (2017)
- Cinta Olshoper Gak Ketuker (2017)
- Buka Taplak Dot Kom (2018)
- When Ustadz Pulang Kampung (2018)
- Sebakul Cinta Gadis Bekatul (2018)
- Asisten Cantik Naik Pangkat (2018)
- Sule Pulang Haji Dapet Jodoh (2018)
- Rebutan Hati Miss Cupu (2019)
- Milyader Kece dengan Kearifan Lokal (2019)
- Aku Mohabbatein Sama Kamu (2019)
- Masih Sayang tapi Bimbang (2019)
- Rayuan Gombal Kumbang Metropolitan (2020)

=== Music video appearances ===
Year	Title	Singer	Notes	Ref.
2021	"Bagaimana Kalau Aku Tidak Baik-Baik Saja"	Judika		
2021	"Mencinta Hati yang Tak Cinta"	Arsy Widianto		
2023	"Di Depan Mata"	Mikha Tambayong		
2024	"Tak Ada yang Sebanding Denganmu"	Dewa 19		
2026	"Adu Pandang"	Rizky Febian		

== Discography ==
=== Single ===
As the lead singer
Year	Title	Album	Notes	Ref.
2016	"Aladin dan Putri Yasmin"	Non-album single		
2018	"Jangan Pernah Berubah"	Non-album single		
2019	"Rindu yang Meradang"	Non-album single		
2019	"Jangan Kau Henti"	Non-album single	With Lingua	
2020	"Untitled"	Non-album single		
2020	"Setia atau Bodoh"	Non-album single		
2021	"Cinta Hebat"	Kisah untuk Geri	Featuring Angga Yunanda	
2022	"Cinta Terakhirku"	Non-album single	With Arsy Widianto	
2023	"Berat Kupendam"	200 Pounds Beauty (Original Motion Picture Soundtrack)		
2023	"Duniaku"	200 Pounds Beauty (Original Motion Picture Soundtrack)		
2023	"Born to Be a Star"	200 Pounds Beauty (Original Motion Picture Soundtrack)		

=== Extended play ===
Compilation EP
Year	Title	EP Detail	Ref.
2021	Kisah untuk Geri	Release: 16 April 2021; Label: MD Music Indonesia; Format: Digital	

== Awards and nominations ==
Year	Award	Category	Work	Result	Ref.
2016	2016 SCTV Awards	Most Popular Newcomer	Mermaid in Love	Nominated	
2017	2017 Infotainment Awards	Most Captivating Newcomer Celebrity	Mermaid in Love	Nominated	
2020	2020 Bandung Film Festival	Commendable Lead Actress in a Web Series	Magic Tumbler	Nominated	
2020	2020 Tempo Film Festival	Tempo's Choice for Lead Actress	Sejuta Sayang Untuknya	Won	
2021	2021 Infotainment Awards	Best Couple (With Rizky Nazar)	–	Nominated	
2022	2022 Bandung Film Festival	Commendable Lead Actress in a Web Series	17 Selamanya	Nominated	
2022	2022 Indonesian Film Journalists Festival	Best Supporting Actress in a Horror Genre	Jailangkung: Sandekala	Nominated	
2023	2023 Telkomsel Awards	Favorite Streaming Female Talent	Princess &amp; the Boss	Won	
2023	2023 Indonesian Television Awards	Most Popular Soap Opera Actress	Bidadari Surgamu	Nominated	
2023	2023 Infotainment Awards	Most Charming Famale Celebrity	–	Nominated	
2023	2023 Bandung Film Festival	Commendable Lead Actress in a Feature Film	200 Pounds Beauty	Nominated	
2023	2023 SCTV Awards	Most Popular Supporting Actress	Bidadari Surgamu	Won	
