= Gusti Irwan Wibowo =

Indonesian musician, songwriter and entertainer (1999–2025)

- Also known as: Gustiwiw
- Born: 28 November 1999; Bekasi, Indonesia
- Died: 15 June 2025 (aged 25) Lembang, Bandung, Indonesia
- Occupations: Musician, songwriter, producer, broadcaster, comedian
- Instruments: Vocal, piano, guitar, drum, ukulele

Gusti Irwan Wibowo (28 November 1999 – 15 June 2025), also known as Gustiwiw, was an Indonesian musician, music producer, songwriter, comedian, content creator and entertainer. He was also known for producing music for other prominent Indonesian artists, such as Raisa, Ardhito Pramono, Sal Priadi, Danilla Riyadi, Nadin Amizah, and others.

Gusti was known for promoting his own music genre, namely "Endikup" (which literally translates to "pleasing to the ears"), by combining dangdut, pop music, orchestra, and traditional Malay music, with unserious and comedic lyrics.

He released an album titled Duh Gusti in 2023. He died in 2025 while preparing for his second album, which was released posthumously a month later.

== Life and career ==
Gusti was born 28 November 1999 in Bekasi, and graduated from the Cikini College Music Vocational School. He was the son of Timur Priyono, a musician from the 80s, who was known for songs such as "Yang Penting Happy", "Kawin Silang", and "Sedap Betul". Gusti's father forbade him from listening to any Indonesian songs when he was young. Hence, he became influenced by Western artists such as Queen, Whitney Houston, and The Police, with the Greek composer Yanni influencing Gusti's approach to orchestral music.

Releasing various songs since 2015, he rose to fame when he became the music producer for famous Indonesian musicians. Mainly, when he produced songs for Nadin Amizah, Ardhito Pramono and Sal Priadi. He was also active as a radio announcer on Gen FM and a host of podcast programs on YouTube, namely "Kedubes Bekasi" and "Trick Room". All of these programs were hosted with his comedic partner, Nehru Rindra.

Gusti died in Lembang, Bandung on 15 June 2025, after collapsing in the bathroom hotel due to a heart attack. He was 25.

== Discography ==
=== Studio albums ===
==== As Lead Artist ====
- "Endikup (2025)
- "Duh Gusti" (2023)
- "Platonis" (EP) (2020)

=== Singles ===
==== As Featured Guest ====
| Title | Lead Artist | Album | Album details |
|---|---|---|---|
| Kesan Pertama | Ardhito Pramono | Wijayakusuma | Released: 13 July 2022; Label: Aksara Records |

==== As Lead Artist ====
- "Pertanyaan" (2018)
- "Platonis" (2020)
- "Padahal Ada Teknologi" (2020)
- "Desember" (2020)
- "Yuk Semangat!" (2020)
- "Benalu" (2021)
- "Hai Kamu" (2022)
- "Rumah Impian" (2023)
- "Diculik Cinta" (2024)
- "Lanjutkan Perjuangan Kita" (2024)
- "Icik Icik Bum Bum" (2025)

== Production Discography ==
=== Studio albums ===
| Title | Lead Artist | Album details |
|---|---|---|
| Wijayakusuma | Ardhito Pramono | Released: 13 July 2022; Label: Aksara Records |

=== Singles ===
| Title | Lead Artist | Album | Single Details |
|---|---|---|---|
| Feromon | Bucek Depp | OST: GJLS Ibuku Ibu-Ibu | Released: 12 June 2025; Produced by Gusti Irwan Wibowo; Music by, and originally made popular by Orkes Pensil Alis |
| It's Okay Not to Be Okay | Raisa | AmbiVert | Released: 13 February 2025; Label: Juni Records |
| Dari Planet Lain | Sal Priadi | Markers and Such Pens Flashdisks | Released: 30 April 2024; Produced, Arranged, Orchestrated by Gusti Irwan Wibowo; Piano, Drums, Guitar, Ukulele, and Bass played by Gusti Irwan Wibowo |
| Yasudah | Sal Priadi | Markers and Such Pens Flashdisks | Released: 15 March 2024; Produced, Arranged, and Choir by Gusti Irwan Wibowo; Piano, Drums, Guitar, Ukulele, and Bass played by Gusti Irwan Wibowo |
| Berpayung Tuhan | Nadin Amizah | Untuk Dunia, Cinta, dan Kotornya | Lyric by Nadin Amizah; Notation and Chords by Nadin Amizah and Gusti Irwan Wibowo; Produced, Arranged by Gusti Irwan Wibowo; Drums, Piano, Guitar, and Bass played by Gusti Irwan Wibowo; Released: 13 October 2023 |
| Jangan Ditelan | Nadin Amizah | Untuk Dunia, Cinta, dan Kotornya | Notation and Chords by Nadin Amizah and Gusti Irwan Wibowo; Produced by Gusti Irwan Wibowo and Danang Estu Pamungkas; Released: 13 October 2023; Label: |
| Arah | Aurélie Moeremans | OST Story of Dinda | Co-Produced and Co-Arranged with Ardhito Pramono; Released: 6 November 2021 |

=== Other Contributions on Songs by other Artists ===
==== Sal Priadi ====
- "Foto Kita Blur" (2024) - Producer
- "Episode" (2024) - Producer
- "Ada titik-titik di ujung doa" (2024) - Producer, Arranger, Orchestrator
- "Lewat sudah pukul dua, makin banyak bicara kita" (2024) - Producer, Arranger, Orchestrator

==== Danilla Riyadi ====
- "Tak" (2024) - Backing Vocals

== Filmography ==
- "GJLS: Ibuku Ibu-Ibu" (2025) - Cameo
- "Perayaan Mati Rasa" (2025) - Cameo
