= Mermaid in Love =

Indonesian fantasy television series

- Genre: Teen; Romantic comedy; Fantasy
- Created by: Mega Kreasi Films
- Directed by: Findo Purnowo HW
- Starring: Amanda Manopo; Angga Aldi Yunanda; Esa Sigit; Arnold Leonard; Jovita Karen; Rebecca Klopper; Adzwa Aurell; Bryan Andrew; Ferry Maryadi; Adelia Rasya; Allya Rossa; Naufal Samudra; Mat Rozi; Erma Zarina; Rully Ramadhani; Renald Ramadhan; Meinorizah; Neni Anggraeni; Rully Fiss; Laila Sari; Beby Tsabina; Indra Birowo; Kevin Hillers; Deswita Maharani; Elina Joerg; Syifa Hadju; Ayu Pratiwi
- Theme music composer: Shae
- Opening theme: "Sayang" — Shae
- Ending theme: "Sayang" — Shae
- Composer: Ishvara Giovanni
- Country of origin: Indonesia
- Original language: Indonesian
- No. of seasons: 2
- No. of episodes: 158

Production
- Executive producer: Subagio Samtomo
- Producers: Sonu Samtani; Sonya Mukhi; Shalu Mulani
- Camera setup: Multi-camera
- Running time: 60 minutes
- Production company: Mega Kreasi Films

Original release
- Network: SCTV
- Release: 2 May – 7 October 2016

Related
- Mermaid in Love 2 Dunia

Mermaid in Love is an Indonesian fantasy television series produced by Mega Kreasi Films which premiered on 2 May 2016 on SCTV. It stars Amanda Manopo, Angga Aldi Yunanda, and Esa Sigit.

Apart from being a television series, this series was also made into a television film titled Lope Mermaid In Love in 2016 special to celebrate SCTV's anniversary. The second season of this series titled Mermaid In Love 2 Dunia which aired on 5 December 2016. It stars Amanda Manopo, Angga Aldi Yunanda and Bastian Steel. and re-run on 16 December 2017.

== Plot ==
Ariel (Amanda Manopo) is a mermaid who lives far from the seabed. Unable to stay still, she constantly seeks a new life and is fascinated by the human world. She is particularly envious of life on land, where people frequently post pictures of their food on social media. Ariel is rarely without her gadgets and uniquely carries a mobile phone around her neck.

Ariel is also fascinated by an ordinary human life and becomes particularly interested in a young man who often visits the beach where she lives. He is bored because his home is occupied only by women and longs for the company of handsome men.

One day, while Ariel and her friend Buled (Meinorizah) are playing in the ocean, they encounter two handsome boys riding jet skis. Both immediately fall for them. One of the boys is Troy (Esa Sigit), who has come to the beach with his parents to celebrate the 17th birthday of his younger brother, Erick (Angga Aldi Yunanda). While Troy, Erick and Bhishma (Arnold Leonard) are playing with a speedboat, Erick falls into the water and begins to drown. Ariel mistakenly believes Troy is in danger and rushes to rescue him, only to discover that she has actually saved Erick. During the rescue, Erick catches a glimpse of the beautiful mermaid.

== Cast ==
- Amanda Manopo as Ariel
- Angga Aldi Yunanda as Eric
- Esa Sigit as Troy
- Rebecca Klopper as Sasya Van Derkock
- Syifa Hadju as Maya
- Deswita Maharani as Euis
- Elina Joerg as Raina
- Arnold Leonard as Bisma
- Jovita Karen as Cindy
- Adzwa Aurell as Mimi
- Bryan Andrew as Justin
- Ferry Maryadi as Charly Van Derkock
- Adelia Rasya as Fatimah
- Allya Rossa as Bunda
- Naufal Samudra as Roby
- Mat Rozi as Thamrin
- Erma Zarina as Mamik
- Rully Ramadhani as Tini
- Renald Ramadhan as Bara
- Meinorizah as Buled
- Neni Anggraeni as Madam Mermaid
- Rully Fiss as Bembi
- Laila Sari as Mbah
- Ayu Pratiwi as Raisa
- Beby Tsabina as Ruby
- Indra Birowo as Abah
- Kevin Hillers as Rangga

== Production ==
=== Filming ===
On 8 August 2016 the show completed 100 episodes.

== Controversy ==
=== IBC give written warning ===
Indonesian Broadcasting Commission (IBC) imposed a written sanction on the 22 August 2016 broadcast due to showing the students that boys want to achieve with the conversation "can you just not help me just once", "Ril, because your love gave me courage", "but ril, your life is more valuable...", "Ril, I don't care how big the risk is, because I'm afraid of losing you ril… without you and me there would be no us Ril”, “I've never felt this big”.. and showing a scene of a boy and a girl holding hands while saying "because I always want to be with you.. you may not be a perfect girl, but I don't care, because since your presence my life has become more perfect, you are the reason why I I can smile at my most difficult times, I can't live without you".
