= Photocopier (film) =

2021 Indonesian crime mystery drama film

- Official poster
- Indonesian: Penyalin Cahaya
- Directed by: Wregas Bhanuteja
- Screenplay by: Henricus Pria (Note: Henricus Pria as scriptwriter was uncredited in the end-credit of the Netflix version due to reports of alleged involvement in sexual abuse cases.); Wregas Bhanuteja
- Produced by: Adhyaksa Ekatama; Ajish Dibyo
- Starring: Shenina Syawalita Cinnamon; Lutesha; Chicco Kurniawan; Dea Panendra; Jerome Kurnia; Giulio Parengkuan; Lukman Sardi; Ruth Marini
- Cinematography: Gunnar Nimpuno
- Edited by: Ahmad Yuniardi
- Music by: Yennu Ariendra
- Production companies: Rekata Studio; Kaninga Pictures
- Distributed by: Netflix
- Release dates: October 8, 2021 (BIFF); January 13, 2022 (Netflix)
- Country: Indonesia
- Language: Indonesian

Photocopier (Indonesian: Penyalin Cahaya) is a 2021 Indonesian crime mystery drama film, co-written and directed by Wregas Bhanuteja in his feature-length directorial debut.

The film had its world premiere at the 26th Busan International Film Festival in October 2021, in the New Currents competition. The film won a total of twelve Citra Awards out of seventeen nominations, including the awards for Best Picture and Best Director. It won the most Citra Awards by a single film.

== Plot ==
Suryani (“Sur”), a computer science student and member of the campus theater group Mata Hari, designs the group's website and helps promote its public image. After their stage production of Medusa is selected for a festival in Kyoto, Sur attends a celebratory party at the home of the group's leader, Rama Soemarno, despite warnings from an older student, Farah, and her father not to drink alcohol.

Sur awakens the next morning with little memory of the event and soon learns that photos of her intoxicated have circulated online. Her scholarship is revoked, and her father expels her from the family home after she returns late at night accompanied by an unidentified man. Believing she may have been drugged, Sur begins investigating the party while staying with her friend Amin, who operates a photocopy business. Questioning fellow theater members and reviewing digital evidence, Sur initially suspects Tariq, who had given her a drink. However, video recordings from Rama's house appear to clear him, and others assume Sur posted the images herself. After determining that she consumed relatively little alcohol, Sur becomes convinced that she was incapacitated deliberately.

Her suspicions deepen when she discovers that Rama's installation artwork—presented as images of the Milky Way—are actually manipulated close-ups of human skin resembling her own birthmarks. Confronting Amin, Sur learns that he secretly obtained private photos from students’ phones for Rama under the pretense of artistic inspiration. When Sur reports her findings to the campus Ethics Board, the information is leaked, and Rama's lawyer pressures her into issuing a public apology, which she reluctantly agrees to under institutional and familial pressure. Her mother later believes her account and arranges for her to hide with an acquaintance, Siti, who confirms that proving drugging would now be difficult.

Farah and Tariq soon admit that they were also drugged and that their bodies appear in Rama's artwork. Evidence ultimately obtained from the taxi driver, Burhan—who had driven multiple victims home—reveals recordings of Rama sexually assaulting several individuals, including Sur. Before the material can be used, Rama arrives with hired enforcers disguised as fumigation workers, subdues the group, and destroys the phone containing the recordings, declaring that no one will believe their accusations. Undeterred, Sur and Farah print the remaining evidence using Amin's photocopier on the campus rooftop. Other victims join them with additional proof, publicly exposing Rama's actions. As the documents spread, Anggun confronts and strikes him, while Sur, Farah, and Tariq reproduce images of their own faces, openly identifying themselves as survivors.

== Cast ==
- Shenina Syawalita Cinnamon as Suryani (Sur)
- Chicco Kurniawan as Amin
- Lutesha as Farah
- Jerome Kurnia as Tariq
- Dea Panendra as Anggun
- Giulio Parengkuan as Rama
- Lukman Sardi as Sur's father
- Ruth Marini as Sur's mother
- Yayan Ruhian as Rama's father
- Landung Simatupang as Burhan
- Rukman Rosadi as Sur's college dean
- Mian Tiara as Siti

== Production ==
The production of Photocopier took place for twenty days in Jakarta during the COVID-19 pandemic and followed local COVID-19 safety protocols.

Through Photocopier, Bhanuteja strived to give a depiction of a victim of sexual assaults, also spread awareness regarding to the topic. Previously, Bhanuteja along with his team, had researched about the topic for a year, including initiating conversations with the victims of sexual assaults. They also started discussions with some anti-rape activists, including actress Hannah Al Rashid, who was involved in the film's screenwriting.

== Release ==
Photocopier had its world premiere at the 26th Busan International Film Festival in October 2021, in the New Currents competition. Netflix acquired the film's distribution rights, releasing it on January 13, 2022.

== Accolades ==
Award	Date	Category	Recipient	Result	Ref.
Indonesian Film Festival	10 November 2021	Best Picture	Adi Ekatama and Ajish Dibyo	Won	
Indonesian Film Festival	10 November 2021	Best Director	Wregas Bhanuteja	Won	
Indonesian Film Festival	10 November 2021	Best Actor	Chicco Kurniawan	Won	
Indonesian Film Festival	10 November 2021	Best Actress	Shenina Syawalita Cinnamon	Nominated	
Indonesian Film Festival	10 November 2021	Best Supporting Actor	Jerome Kurnia	Won	
Indonesian Film Festival	10 November 2021	Best Supporting Actor	Giulio Parengkuan	Nominated	
Indonesian Film Festival	10 November 2021	Best Supporting Actress	Dea Panendra	Nominated	
Indonesian Film Festival	10 November 2021	Best Original Screenplay	Wregas Bhanuteja and Henricus Pria	Won	
Indonesian Film Festival	10 November 2021	Best Cinematography	Gunnar Nimpuno	Won	
Indonesian Film Festival	10 November 2021	Best Film Editing	Ahmad Yuniardi	Won	
Indonesian Film Festival	10 November 2021	Best Visual Effects	Stefanus Binawan Utama	Nominated	
Indonesian Film Festival	10 November 2021	Best Sound	Sutrisno and Satrio Budiono	Won	
Indonesian Film Festival	10 November 2021	Best Original Score	Yennu Ariendra	Won	
Indonesian Film Festival	10 November 2021	Best Original Song	Mian Tiara ("Di Bawah Langit Raksasa")	Won	
Indonesian Film Festival	10 November 2021	Best Art Direction	Dita Gambiro	Won	
Indonesian Film Festival	10 November 2021	Best Costume Design	Fadillah Putri Yunidar	Won	
Indonesian Film Festival	10 November 2021	Best Make Up and Hairstyling	Astrid Sambudiono	Nominated	
Film Pilihan Tempo	20 December 2021	Film Pilihan Tempo	Photocopier	Won	
Film Pilihan Tempo	20 December 2021	Best Director	Wregas Bhanuteja	Won	
Film Pilihan Tempo	20 December 2021	Best Screenplay	Wregas Bhanuteja and Henricus Pria	Won	
Film Pilihan Tempo	20 December 2021	Best Actress	Shenina Cinnamon	Nominated	
