= Dea Panendra =

Indonesian actress and singer (born 1991)

- Born: Panendra Larasati; 18 January 1991 (age 35); Bandung, West Java, Indonesia
- Occupations: Actress; singer
- Years active: 2010—present

Panendra Larasati (born 18 January 1991), known professionally as Dea Panendra is an Indonesian actress and singer. She rose to prominence for starring in Marlina the Murderer in Four Acts (2017), which garnered her the Citra Award for Best Supporting Actress at the 2018 Indonesian Film Festival.

== Career ==
=== Music career ===
In 2010, Panendra had her breakthrough into entertainment industry by auditioning for the sixth season of Indonesian Idol. She was eliminated on 28 May, finishing in eleventh place after being in the bottom three weeks in a row.

Performances/results
Episode	Song choice	Original artist	Result
Audition	Unaired		Advanced
Workshop Round, Part 1	"Perih"	Vierra	Advanced
Workshop Round, Part 2	"Masih Cinta"	Kotak	Advanced
Workshop Round, Part 3	"Makhluk Tuhan Paling Sexy"	Mulan Jameela	Advanced
Top 14	"Masih Cinta"	Kotak	Bottom three
Top 13	"Sang Penghibur"	Padi	Bottom four
Top 11	"Baru Aku Tahu Cinta Itu Apa"	Indah Dewi Pertiwi	Eliminated

In addition to her acting, Panendra also sang several soundtracks to films in which she starred. In 2020, Panendra released a single "Dari Kata Turun Ke Hati" for the soundtrack of The Ex-Lover Shop. In 2024, she released a collaborative single with Ricecooker, a band fronted by co-star Jerome Kurnia, "If You Let Me", for the Love Unlike in K-Dramas soundtrack.

=== Acting career ===
In 2016, Panendra auditioned for the musical film directed by Nia Dinata, Three Sassy Sisters which was inspired by 1956 film Tiga Dara. She auditioned to portray Bebe, the little sister, alongside Asmara Abigail, Galabby Thahira, Meirayni Fauziah, Cindy Nirmala, Alika Islamadina, and others, but ultimately Tatyana Akman was chosen. She eventually starred as an extra in the film. Panendra starred in a supporting role of Novi in Mouly Surya's Marlina the Murderer in Four Acts, which had its world premiere at the 2017 Cannes Film Festival. For her performance, she won the Citra Award for Best Supporting Actress at the 2018 Indonesian Film Festival. She received her second Citra Award nomination for her role in Photocopier at the 2021 Indonesian Film Festival.

== Filmography ==
=== Film ===
Year	Title	Role	Note
2016	Three Sassy Sisters	Kitchen staff	
2017	Marlina the Murderer in Four Acts	Novi	
2017	Chrisye	Ratih	
2018	Danur 2: Maddah	Canting	
2019	Newly Rich	Monika	
2019	Gundala	Bonita	
2019	Danur 3: Sunyaruri	Canting	
2019	Glorious Days	Ayu	
2020	The Ex-Lover Shop	Amel	
2020	Jakarta, City of Dreamers	Khansa	
2021	Affliction	Narsih	
2021	Dea	Dea	
2021	The Heaven None Missed 3	Welas	
2021	Makmum 2	Lastri	
2021	Photocopier	Anggun	
2021	Just Mom	Sum	
2022	I Need You Baby	Juwita Karmila	
2022	Ghost Writer 2	Ida	
2022	New Normal	Melissa	
2022	Gendut Siapa Takut?!	Elaneno	
2023	Bismillah Kunikahi Suamimu	Sumi	
2023	Pamali: The Corpse Village	Gendis	
2023	Blessed You	Astrid	
2024	Love Unlike in K-Dramas	Kikan	
2025	The Most Beautiful Girl in the World	Dita	
2025	Lost in the Spotlight	Dimi	

=== Television ===
Year	Title	Role	Network	Notes
2017	The Publicist	Maya	Viu	
2020	Saiyo Sakato	Susi	Goplay	
2021	Jarak & Waktu	Kinanti Larasati	Mola TV	
2021	Beautifool	Jelita	STRO	
2021	Ritual the Series	Sonya	TrueID	
2022	Dating Queen	Ratih	Vidio	
2023	Ex-Addicts Club	Vivian Veronica	Netflix	
2023	The Talent Agency	Salma Putri	Disney+ Hotstar	
2023	The Sexy Doctor Is Mine	Meity	Vidio	Season 2
