= At Stake =

2017 film

- Theatrical release poster
- Indonesian: Pertaruhan
- Literally: Betting
- Directed by: Krishto Damar Alam
- Written by: Upi Avianto
- Produced by: Adianto Sumardjono
- Starring: Adipati Dolken; Aliando Syarief; Tio Pakusadewo; Jefri Nichol; Giulio Parengkuan; Widika Sidmore; Tarzan; Silvia Anggraini
- Production company: IFI Sinema
- Release dates: 9 February 2017 (Indonesia); 18 June 2017 (China); 14 July 2017 (South Korea); 23 September 2017 (Italy); 19 November 2020 (Netflix)
- Running time: 110 minutes
- Country: Indonesia
- Language: Indonesian

At Stake (Indonesian: Pertaruhan, lit. 'Betting') is a 2017 Indonesian action drama film directed by Krishto Damar Alam and written by Upi Avianto. The movie stars Adipati Dolken, Aliando Syarief, Tio Pakusadewo, Jefri Nichol, Giulio Parengkuan, Widika Sidmore, Tarzan, and Silvia Anggraini. At Stake was theatrically released in Indonesia on 9 February 2017.

== Plot ==
Brothers Ibra, Elzan, Amar, and Ical live with their father, a dedicated bank security guard worker. Following the death of their mother, the brothers develop a worsening relationship with their father.

When Mr. Musa is laid off from his job and falls ill with a respiratory illness, Ibra encourages his brothers to find ways to support their father's medical expenses. Rejected and humiliated when they seek a loan from their father's bank, the brothers decide to seek the funds through illegal means.

== Cast ==
- Adipati Dolken as Ibrahim Prahara (Ibra)
- Aliando Syarief as Amar
- Tio Pakusadewo as Musa Firdaus (Mr. Musa)
- Jefri Nichol as Elzan
- Giulio Parengkuan as Ahmad Faisal (Ical)
- Widika Sidmore as Jamila Adhisti (Jamila)
- Tarzan as Mr. Hajj
- Silvia Anggraini as Asti

== Release ==
At Stake was theatrically released in Indonesia on 9 February 2017. The film's trailer premiered on January 7, 2017.

The film was also released at the Shanghai International Film Festival on June 18, 2017, in China, the Bucheon International Fantastic Film Festival on 14 July 2017, in South Korea, and the Firenze Film Festival on 23 September 2017, in Italy.

The film was released through the streaming service Netflix in selected countries on 19 November 2020.
