= List of 2019 box office number-one films in Indonesia =

This is a list of films which placed number one at the weekend box office for the year 2019 in Indonesia with the weekly admissions.

== Number-one films ==
†	This implies the highest-grossing movie of the year.

#	Weekend end date	Film	Weekly admissions	Ref.
1	6 January 2019	Cemara's Family	460,036	
2	13 January 2019	Cemara's Family	575,598	
3	20 January 2019	Cemara's Family	415,704	
4	27 January 2019	Preman Pensiun	398,807	
5	3 February 2019	Orang Kaya Baru	400,733	
6	10 February 2019	Orang Kaya Baru	302,496	
7	17 February 2019	Satu Suro	144,092	
8	24 February 2019	Foxtrot Six	255,856	
9	3 March 2019	Dilan 1991	2,647,773	
10	10 March 2019	Captain Marvel	3,529,000	
11	27 March 2019	Captain Marvel	1,820,000	
12	24 March 2019	Captain Marvel	689,000	
13	31 March 2019	My Stupid Boss 2	776,420	
14	7 April 2019	Shazam!	1,512,000	
15	14 April 2019	My Stupid Boss 2	261,505	
16	21 April 2019	The Curse of La Llorona	479,000	
17	28 April 2019	Avengers: Endgame †	4,974,004	
18	5 May 2019	Avengers: Endgame †	4,854,611	
19	12 May 2019	Avengers: Endgame †	974,752	
20	19 May 2019	John Wick: Chapter 3 – Parabellum	824,000	
21	26 May 2019	Aladdin	1,879,211	
22	2 June 2019	Aladdin	1,671,298	
23	9 June 2019	Aladdin	1,315,097	
24	16 June 2019	Dark Phoenix	1,017,000	
25	23 June 2019	Men in Black: International	941,000	
26	30 June 2019	Annabelle Comes Home	1,538,000	
27	7 July 2019	Spider-Man: Far From Home	3,080,598	
28	14 July 2019	Spider-Man: Far From Home	1,713,315	
29	21 July 2019	Two Blue Stripes	1,009,233	
30	28 July 2019	Two Blue Stripes	509,410	
31	4 August 2019	Hobbs & Shaw	2,823,898	
32	11 August 2019	Hobbs & Shaw	885,711	
33	18 August 2019	This Earth of Mankind	411,216	
34	25 August 2019	This Earth of Mankind	524,940	
35	1 September 2019	The Lion King	1,780,547	
36	8 September 2019	It Chapter Two	1,000,000	
37	15 September 2019	Angel Has Fallen	678,000	
38	22 September 2019	Hayya: The Power of Love 2	415,317	
39	29 September 2019	Danur 3: Sunyaruri	977,145	
40	6 October 2019	Joker	1,918,000	
41	13 October 2019	Joker	1,662,000	
42	20 October 2019	Maleficent: Mistress of Evil	1,525,000	
43	27 October 2019	Maleficent: Mistress of Evil	1,064,000	
44	3 November 2019	Terminator: Dark Fate	1,056,000	
45	10 November 2019	Terminator: Dark Fate	544,000	
46	17 November 2019	Charlie's Angels	898,000	
47	24 November 2019	Frozen 2	1,961,000	
48	1 December 2019	Frozen 2	1,537,000	
49	8 December 2019	Jumanji: The Next Level	2,002,000	
50	15 December 2019	Jumanji: The Next Level	1,428,000	
51	22 December 2019	Star Wars: The Rise of Skywalker	903,000	
52	29 December 2019	Habibie & Ainun 3	1,013,834	

== Highest-grossing films ==
International film Indonesian film

Highest-grossing films of 2019 (In year release)
Rank	Title	Total admissions
1	Avengers: Endgame	11,145,570
2	Captain Marvel	6,298,000
3	Aladdin	5,874,112
4	Spider-Man: Far From Home	5,377,529
5	Dilan 1991	5,253,411
6	Frozen 2	4,636,000
7	Jumanji: The Next Level	4,558,000
8	Joker	4,239,000
9	Hobbs & Shaw	4,186,635
10	Maleficent: Mistress of Evil	3,265,000

== See also ==
- List of highest-grossing films in Indonesia

Preceded by 2018	2019	Succeeded by 2020
