= Layla Majnun (film) =

2021 Indonesian film

- Release poster
- Directed by: Monty Tiwa
- Written by: Alim Sudio; Monty Tiwa
- Starring: Acha Septriasa; Reza Rahadian; Baim Wong
- Production company: StarVision Plus
- Distributed by: Netflix
- Release date: 11 February 2021
- Running time: 119 minutes
- Country: Indonesia
- Languages: Indonesian and Azeri

Layla Majnun is a 2021 Indonesian drama film directed by Monty Tiwa, written by Alim Sudio and Monty Tiwa and starring Acha Septriasa, Reza Rahadian and Baim Wong.

== Cast ==
- Acha Septriasa as Laila
- Reza Rahadian as Qais / Majnun
- Baim Wong as Ibnu Salam
- Dian Nitami as Fatmi
- Beby Tsabina as Narmina
- Uli Herdinansyah as Ilham Ismail
- Natasha Rizki as Niken
- Eriska Rein as Ailin
- Landung Simatupang as Ahmadi Ruslan
- August Melasz as Wisnu Salam
- Chantiq Schagerl as Winda
- Cut Ashifa as Nita
- Aida Cabiyeva as Sabina Kerimli
- Angelia Livie as young Layla
- Murad Ismayil as Rashad Mansurov

== Release ==
It was released as a Netflix Original on February 11, 2021.

== Accolades ==
Award	Date	Category	Recipient	Result	Ref.
Indonesian Film Festival	10 November 2021	Best Actor	Reza Rahadian	Nominated	
Indonesian Film Festival	10 November 2021	Best Adapted Screenplay	Alim Sudio	Nominated	
Indonesian Film Festival	10 November 2021	Best Cinematography	Anggi Frisca	Nominated	
Indonesian Film Festival	10 November 2021	Best Visual Effects	Capluk	Nominated	
Indonesian Film Festival	10 November 2021	Best Original Score	Andi Rianto	Nominated	
Indonesian Film Festival	10 November 2021	Best Art Direction	Tepan Kobain and Angga Prasetyo	Nominated	
Indonesian Film Festival	10 November 2021	Best Costume Design	Aldie Harra	Nominated	
Indonesian Film Festival	10 November 2021	Best Make Up and Hairstyling	Rinie May and Cherry Wirawan	Nominated	
