= Mona Ratuliu =

Indonesian actress and presenter (born 1982)

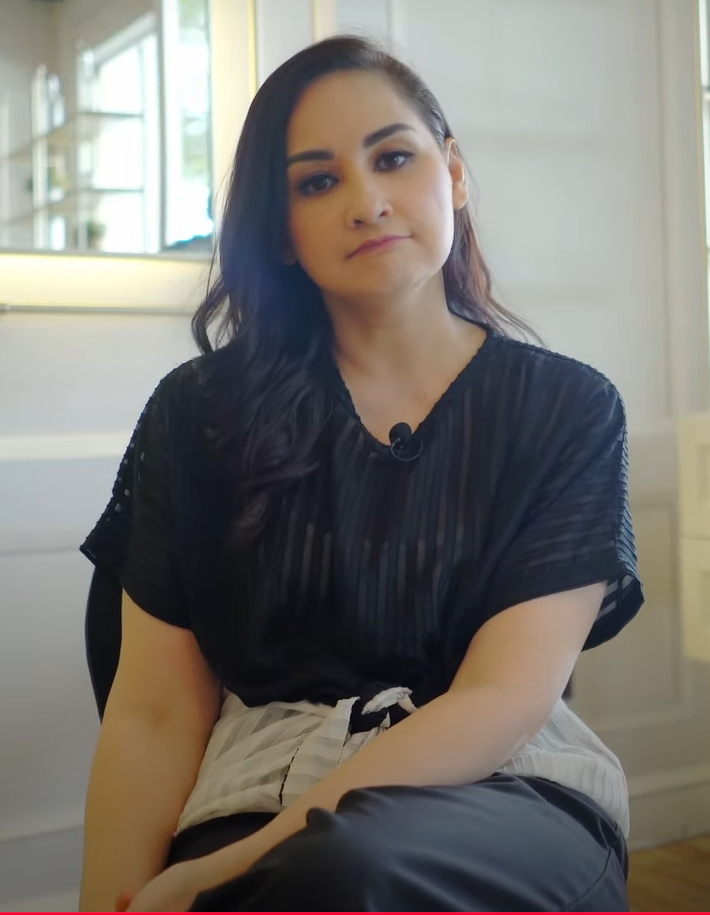
- Born: Margaretha Veronica Ratuliu; January 31, 1982 (age 44); Jakarta, Indonesia
- Occupations: Celebrity, Presenter
- Spouse: Indra Brasco (m. 2002)
- Children: 4
- Parent(s): Albert Frederick Ratuliu; Neng Dedeh Sumiati
- Relatives: Fernando Fransiscus Ratuliu

Mona Ratuliu (born January 31, 1982, in Jakarta) is an Indonesian actress and presenter. She appeared in the soap operas Lupus Milenia and Pelangi Di Matamu. She is a graduate of the Faculty of Graphic Design of Tarumanegara University.

== Career ==
Mona Ratuliu began her career as an actress in the soap opera Hati Yang Perawan on ANTV. She gained more fame from her work in Pelangi Dimatamu. She has also appeared in other shows such as Bunga Kasih Sayang, Hikayah, and Dewa. Film appearances include Ekskul and Rahasia Bintang. Ekskul won the Citra Award for Best Film at the 2006 Indonesian Film Festival.

== Personal life ==
Mona Ratuliu was born on January 31, 1982, in Jakarta. She is the second child of Albert Frederick Ratuliu and Neng Dedeh Sumiati. She married Elton, an actor and businessperson, on September 14, 2018. They have 4 children.

== Filmography ==
=== Film ===
| Year | Title | Role | Notes |
|---|---|---|---|
| 2006 | Ekskul | Wife | Special appearances |
| 2008 | Rahasia Bintang | | Supporting role |

=== Television ===
| Year | Title | Role | Notes | Network |
|---|---|---|---|---|
| 1994 | Hati Yang Perawan | | | ANTV |
| 1995 | Kucing-Kucing Hitam | | | |
| 1995 | Sirkuit Kemelut | | | Indosiar |
| 1997 - 1998 | New Pondok Indah | | | ANTV |
| 1998 | Kupu-Kupu Ungu | | | ANTV |
| 1999 | Janji Hati | | | SCTV |
| 1999 - 2002 | Lupus Millenia | Poppy | | Indosiar |
| 2000 - 2001 | Cinta Abadi | | | Indosiar |
| 2001 - 2002 | Pelangi Dimatamu | Sofia | | RCTI |
| 2002 | Melintas Badai | | | SCTV |
| 2002 | Antara 2 Alam | | | SCTV |
| 2002 | Gregetan | | | |
| 2002 | Bulan Madu Terpanjang | | | TVRI |
| 2002 | Dewa Cinta | | | TV7 |
| 2004 | Ada Jalan Ke Roma | | | SCTV |
| 2006 | Bunga Kasih Sayang | | | RCTI |
| 2006 | Hikayah | | | Trans TV |
| 2010 - 2011 | Putri yang Ditukar | Gusti | | RCTI |
| 2011 - 2012 | Dewa | Dini | | RCTI |
| 2013 | Surat Kecil Untuk Tuhan The Series | Nandita | | RCTI |
| 2014 | Semua Sayang Eneng | Eneng's mother | | RCTI |
| 2015 | Jakarta Love Story | Shinta's mother | | RCTI |
| 2023 - 2024 | Dia yang Kau Pilih | Mita | Antagonist | SCTV |
| 2024 | Bidadari Surgamu | Manda | Protagonist | SCTV |
| 2024 - 2025 | Aku Tak Membenci Hujan | Andira Deepa (Karang's mother) | | VIU |

== TV commercials ==
- Extraderm
- Akari
- Blue Beach
