= Best Friends Forever (Indonesian TV series) =

Indonesian television series

- Genre: Mystery; Romance
- Created by: Manoj Punjabi
- Screenplay by: Setah
- Directed by: Chiska Doppert
- Starring: Randy Martin; Cassandra Lee; Beby Tsabina; Endy Arfian; Afifah Ifah'nda; Jennifer Coppen; Adzwa Aurel; Junior Roberts; Shirley Margaretha; Natalie Sarah; Ratu Felisha; Erwin Cortez; Juliana Moechtar; Fredy Amin; Adhitya Alkatiri; Didi Riyadi
- Opening theme: "Cinta Untukmu" by Sarah Saputri
- Country of origin: Indonesia
- Original language: Indonesian
- No. of episodes: 21

Production
- Executive producer: Dhampoo Punjabi
- Producer: Manoj Punjabi
- Running time: 60 minutes

Original release
- Network: Trans TV
- Release: 7 August – 27 August 2017

Best Friends Forever is an Indonesian mystery thriller teen drama produced by MD Entertainment for Trans TV. The drama is loosely based on the popular American TV series Pretty Little Liars. Best Friends Forever aired on Trans TV between 8 August and 27 August 2017.

Best Friends Forever follows the lives of four high school students: Tari, Ami, Yuna, and Saras after they schemed to get rid of their friend, Elsa.

== Plot ==
On Elsa's birthday, her best friends – Tari, Ami, Yuna, and Saras – are throwing her a surprise party. However, they secretly scheme to take her down by spilling her drink, causing her to fell from the second floor and be put in a coma. Eleven months later, the girls received an anonymous message from "BFF" who threatens to expose their crime, unless they have a clear answer. Initially, the girls thought it was Elsa herself, but realize that it was someone else who wanted revenge after knowing Elsa is still in a coma.

One year after the incident, Elsa wakes up. Upon her return to school, she is excited to reunite with her friends, only to find them dismissing her. Elsa also finds out her boyfriend, Erick, is dating Tari, who became the new leader of her former circle of friends. The girls started to bully and torture Elsa with occasional helps from him just as they receive more messages from "BFF", who is going as far as stalking and threatening their lives.

== Cast ==
- Randy Martin as Alfa, a student who becomes Elsa's love interest
- Cassandra Lee as Elsa, the kind leader of her popular clique. Elsa fell into a coma for a year as a result of her friends' scheme.
  - Lee also portrayed Elsa's older twin sister, who is "BFF" in the last episode
- Beby Tsabina as Tari, the new leader of Elsa's group of friends.
- Endy Arfian as Erick, Elsa's ex-boyfriend who is later dating Tari.
- Afifah Ifah'nda as Ami
- Jennifer Coppen as Yuna
- Adzwa Aurel as Saras, the smart one of the group
- Nicole Patricia Slee as Fina, a nerd girl who wants to be popular and a regular victim of the girls' bullying actions. She followed them the night the incident happened and knew their secret.
- Junior Roberts as Kevin
- Shirley Margaretha as Shirley
- Natalie Sarah as Rani
- Ratu Felisha as Ratu
- Erwin Cortez as Dafa
- Juliana Moechtar as Rio
- Fredy Amin as Fredy
- Adhitya Alkatiri as Raka
- Didi Riyadi as Farhan

== Reception ==
A brief review of the series praised the actors' performances. The series was described as a teen mystery soap-opera.

=== Governmental warning controversy ===
The Central Indonesian Broadcasting Commission (Central KPI) issued a warning for Best Friends Forever considering the program was not paying attention to the provisions regarding the protection of children and adolescents, and that "the program shows many scenes of bullying, terror behavior, and displays clothing that is not in accordance with the ethics that apply in the educational environment".
