= Dear Nathan: Hello Salma =

- Directed by: Indra Gunawan
- Screenplay by: Bagus Bramanti
- Based on: Hello Salma by Erisca Febriani
- Produced by: Gope T. Samtani
- Starring: Amanda Rawles; Jefri Nichol; Devano Danendra; Susan Sameh; Gito Gilas; Zoe Abbas Jackson; Karina Suwandi; Surya Saputra; Miranty Dewi; Naufalie
- Cinematography: Mandela Majid
- Edited by: Ryan Purwoko
- Music by: Andhika Triyadi
- Production company: Rapi Films
- Release dates: 25 October 2018 (Indonesia); 10 September 2020 (Netflix)
- Running time: 102 minutes
- Country: Indonesia
- Language: Indonesian
- Box office: IDR31,2 billion

Dear Nathan: Hello Salma is an Indonesian romantic drama film which was released on 25 October 2018 and directed by Indra Gunawan. A sequel to Dear Nathan, Hello Salma stars Amanda Rawles, Jefri Nichol, Devano Danendra and Susan Sameh. Like its prequel, the film is also based on Dear Nathan novel series by Erisca Febriani. Dear Nathan: Thank You Salma, the final installment in the trilogy, was released in 2022.

== Plot ==
Trying to become a better person, Nathan has quit his bad habits. But this made him a joke, so Nathan couldn't hold back his emotions when one of his friends belittled Salma.

The fight this time made Nathan have to move to another school and separate from Salma. The difference is that this separation is not a story of a long-distance relationship, but a love story between the two that really ends.

Salma was angry to see Nathan, who could not control his emotions, and without thinking, he asked to break up. Meanwhile, Nathan, who had not had time to explain anything, could not say anything other than heeding the wishes of the woman he loved.

Living life at his new school, Nathan accidentally meets a girl who has many problems. The girl is named Rebecca, and she is currently in trouble with one of the popular people at school.

Unwilling to see a group of men belittle Rebecca, Nathan is determined to fight the martial arts champion.

Luckily, Nathan's fight this time didn't get to the BP room; instead, this made Rebecca feel sorry and guilty.

This girl is surprised. Why does Nathan want to help her? Even though they had never met or known each other before. Nathan also replied that he was the same as Rebecca, only he had never thought of killing himself.

Nathan's words stunned Rebecca, especially since that day, the two of them seemed to be getting closer. This time, Nathan wanted to help Rebecca and show her that he was not alone in this world. But Rebecca misunderstood Nathan's good intentions, so the man said that he could not force his love for Rebecca.

On the other hand, Salma is under the strict supervision of her father, who wants her to enter the UI medical department. In fact, her father deliberately brought Salma closer to Ridho so that the girl would not return to Nathan.

His father's pressure had taken away all his dreams. Salma got even worse when she failed to pass SNMPTN to UI. This made Salma very depressed until she met Rebecca, who opened a room for those who were depressed.

Thanks to Rebecca, Salma can slowly release her emotions when she feels insecure and loses herself. Thanks to Rebecca as well, Salma was finally reunited with her ex-boyfriend, Nathan.

Unfortunately, Ridho's presence and the absence of his father's blessing made Nathan and Salma's relationship impossible. Nathan even got arrested at the police station because he was accused of kidnapping Salma, who actually ran away from home.

== Cast ==
- Amanda Rawles as Salma Alvira
- Jefri Nichol as Nathan Januar Prasetyo
- Devano Danendra as Ridho
- Susan Sameh as Rebecca
- Surya Saputra as Nathan's father
- Karina Suwandi as Salma's mother
- Gito Gilas as Salma's father
- Diandra Agatha as Rahma
- Sonia Alexa as Afifah
- Zoe Abbas Jackson as Meysha
- Je Sebastian as Garuda High School principal
- Rendi Jhon as Deni
- Bramanta Sadhu as Albert: Wingchun master
- Firman Ferdiansyah as Robi
- Miranty Dewi as Astrid

== Release ==
Hello Salma was theatrically released in Indonesia on 25 October 2018. The film's trailer premiered on 14 September 2018. The film was also released through the streaming service Netflix in selected countries on 10 September 2020.
