= List of 2020 box office number-one films in Indonesia =

This is a list of films which placed number one at the weekend box office for the year 2020 in Indonesia with the weekly admissions.

== Number-one films ==
| † | This implies the highest-grossing movie of the year. |

| # | Weekend end date | Film | Weekly admissions | Weekend openings in the Top 10 | Ref. |
|---|---|---|---|---|---|
| 1 | 5 January 2020 | Imperfect | 744,972 | — | |
| 2 | 12 January 2020 | One Day We'll Talk About Today | 884,179 | — | |
| 3 | 19 January 2020 | Dolittle | 732,162 | — | |
| 4 | 26 January 2020 | Akhir Kisah Cinta Si Doel | 602,937 | — | |
| 5 | 2 February 2020 | Akhir Kisah Cinta Si Doel | 417,256 | — | |
| 6 | 9 February 2020 | Birds of Prey | 732,586 | — | |
| 7 | 16 February 2020 | Milea † | 1,627,750 | — | |
| 8 | 23 February 2020 | Milea † | 1,130,483 | — | |
| 9 | 1 March 2020 | Sonic the Hedgehog | 682,999 | — | |
| 10 | 8 March 2020 | #FriendbutMarried2 | 374,348 | — | |
| 11 | 15 March 2020 | Bloodshot | 558,060 | — | |
| 12 | 22 March 2020 | Mariposa | 214,807 | — | |
| 13–48 | 29 March 2020 – 29 November 2020 | Indonesian cinemas closed and box office reporting suspended due to the COVID-19 pandemic | | | |
| 49 | 6 December 2020 | Arwah Tumbal Nyai the Trilogy: Part Tumbal | 25,964 | The Empty Man (#2); Come Play (#3) | |
| 50 | 13 December 2020 | Kemarin | 26,018 | Hiruk-Pikuk si Al-Kisah (The Science of Fictions) (#6) | |
| 51 | 20 December 2020 | Arwah Tumbal Nyai the Trilogy: Part Tumbal | 17,262 | — | |
| 52 | 27 December 2020 | Asih 2 | 57,012 | Generasi 90an: Melankolia (#3) | |
| 53 | 3 January 2021 | Asih 2 | 85,721 | The New Mutants (#2) | |

== Highest-grossing films ==
International film Indonesian film

Highest-grossing films of 2020 (In year release)
| Rank | Title | Total admissions |
|---|---|---|
| 1 | Milea | 3,122,263 |
| 2 | One Day We'll Talk About Today | 2,256,908 |
| 3 | Dolittle | 1,303,018 |
| 4 | Bad Boys for Life | 1,283,488 |
| 5 | Akhir Kisah Cinta Si Doel | 1,155,859 |
| 6 | Birds of Prey | 1,138,614 |
| 7 | Sonic the Hedgehog | 868,701 |
| 8 | May the Devil Take You Too | 863,003 |
| 9 | Underwater | 845,138 |
| 10 | Mangkujiwo | 834,806 |

== See also ==
- List of highest-grossing films in Indonesia

| Preceded by 2019 | 2020 | Succeeded by 2021 |
