= Saleha =

Indonesian drama television series

- Genre: Melodrama
- Screenplay by: Serena Luna
- Story by: Sunjoy Shekhar
- Directed by: Umam A. P.
- Starring: Syifa Hadju; Harris Vriza; Teuku Ryan; Teddy Syach; Shinta Bachir; Kinaryosih; Irish Bella; Jonas Rivanno; Rina Hasyim; Ratu Rafa; Anwar Fuady; Krisna Mukti; Lian Firman; Aditya Zoni; Vera Maureen; Devi Ginong; Yuzar Nazaros; Ratu Rafa
- Theme music composer: Aji Mirza Hakim
- Opening theme: "Takkan Berpaling Dari-Mu" by Rossa
- Ending theme: "Takkan Berpaling Dari-Mu" by Rossa
- Composer: Ryan Pitna
- Country of origin: Indonesia
- Original language: Indonesian
- No. of seasons: 1
- No. of episodes: 235

Production
- Executive producer: David S. Suwarto
- Producer: Sridhar Jetty
- Cinematography: Zeta Alfa Maphilindo
- Editors: Rio Destana; Satria; Wewen
- Camera setup: Multi-camera
- Running time: 90 minutes
- Production companies: SinemArt; Ess Jay Studios

Original release
- Network: SCTV; Vidio
- Release: 10 May 2024 – 12 January 2025

Saleha is an Indonesian television drama series that aired on SCTV from 10 May 2024 to 12 January 2025 and streams digitally on Vidio. Produced by SinemArt and starring Syifa Hadju, Harris Vriza and Teuku Ryan.

== Plot ==
Since being born, Saleha has not only lost her biological mother who died giving birth to her, but also her biological father. Her father, Darmawan, did not want to raise Saleha because of the departure of Arini, his beloved wife. Saleha was raised by Grandma Siti in Ramdani and Dita's house. Azzam and Ghania, Ramdani and Dita's two children, also lived in the house. Saleha was willing to suppress her desire to go to college and had to work as a courier to help the family's economy.

While working, Saleha often took photos of luxurious houses, cars, and campuses, then uploaded them to her social media. This habit made her a target for Nando and his friends. Nando was forced to work with his friend to kidnap Saleha in order to get money for his sister's medical treatment. Nando and his friend thought that Saleha came from a wealthy family. Long story short, Saleha was successfully kidnapped, then Nando called Grandma Siti to ask for a ransom.

Hearing that Saleha had been kidnapped, Grandma Siti was shocked and immediately tried to find her granddaughter. Unfortunately, in the middle of the journey, Grandma Siti had a heart attack and eventually died. Nando, who knew that he had the wrong target, asked his friend to free Saleha. Saleha managed to return home, escorted by Nando. When Saleha returned home, Ramdani, Dita, and Ghania immediately blamed Saleha for the death of Grandma Siti, then kicked Saleha out of the house.

Armed with the address given by Dita, Saleha and Azzam went to Jakarta to look for Darmawan, her biological father who turned out to be still alive.

== Cast ==
- Syifa Hadju as Saleha Darmawan / Arini Sastrohadi
- Harris Vriza as Fernando "Nando" Rahmadi
- Teuku Ryan as Azzam Ramdani / Danendra "Danny"
- Teddy Syach as Darmawan
- Shinta Bachir as Sukma
- Kinaryosih as Rianti
- Achul Wiraperwata as Nuryawan
- Ersya Aurelia as Flora
- Rebecca Tamara as Citra
- Emyrrazan as Ferdian Hadi
- Sarah Felicia as Ghania
- Ratu Rafa as Saras
- Rey Bong as Bara Wijayakusuma
- Windy Wulandari as Dita
- Donny Michael as Ario
- Ponco Buwono as Ramdani
- Meidiana Hutomo as Henny
- Najla Atilla as Winna
- Anwar Fuady as Rahmat Hadi
- Rio Alba as Krisna
- Ryma Gembala as Menik
- Yurike Prastika as Siska Adinata
- Annisa Kaila as Mika
- Rachquel Nesia as Nadia Talita
- Irish Bella as Isabella "Bella" Aurora Selina
- Lenny Charlotte as Siti Suharti
- Vera Maureen as Vera
- Dayna Dina as Henny
- Robert Yuhendra as Rahmat
- Leonardy Kusuma as Johan
- Jonas Rivanno as Adrian Darmawangsa
- Krisna Mukti as Firman Suryana
- Yuzar Nazaros as Wiryo
- Lian Firman as Arka
- Jesyca Marlein as Alya Dewi
- Jihad Alfurqon as Marco
- Kimberly Angela as Intan Pratiwi
- Arsenio Rafisqy as Reza
- Risty Tagor as Aisyah
- Faradina Tika as Alisa
- Elryan Carlen as Yudha
- Aditya Zoni as Zidan
- Sharon Sahertian as Zahwa
- Rika Fransiska as Soraya
- Rina Hasyim as Linda
- Devi Ginong as Bibi Yes
- Cahyary Nagara as Hans
- Toto Sudarma as Toto

== Production ==
=== Casting ===
Syifa Hadju was roped for the female lead, Saleha. In July 2024, Teuku Ryan's role, Azzam died and he re-enter with the role of Danny. In same month, Irish Bella to join the show as Bella, after she 5 years hiatus.
