= Bidadari Mencari Sayap =

- Release poster
- Directed by: Aria Kusumadewa
- Written by: Aria Kusumadewa; Go-Chang Senior
- Story by: Aria Kusumadewa
- Produced by: Deddy Mizwar
- Starring: Leony; Rizky Hanggono; Nano Riantiarno; Fransiskus Michael; Djenar Maesa Ayu; Jenny Zhang; Shania Sree Maharani; Deddy Mizwar
- Cinematography: Yatski Hidayat A.
- Edited by: To Chang; Zulfadhli Taufiq
- Music by: Tya Subiakto
- Production companies: Citra Sinema; MD Pictures
- Distributed by: Hotstar
- Release date: 2 October 2020
- Running time: 89 minutes
- Country: Indonesia
- Language: Indonesian

Bidadari Mencari Sayap (transl. Angel Finds Wings) is a 2020 Indonesian melodrama film directed and co-written by Aria Kusumadewa. The film stars Leony and Rizky Hanggono.

== Premise ==
Reza (Hanggono) and Angela (Leony) are trapped in differences in beliefs and culture. Reza, who is a Muslim and of Arab descent, marries Angela, who is of Chinese descent. Even though Angela has decided to convert to Islam, Reza's family still does not accept her presence.

== Cast ==
- Leony as Angela Tan
- Rizky Hanggono as Reza
- Nano Riantiarno as Babah
- Fransiskus Michael as Razak
- Djenar Maesa Ayu as Andrea
- Jenny Zhang as Lina Tan
- Shania Sree Maharani as Soraya
- Deddy Mizwar as Johan
- J.E. Sebastian as Lae Boro
- Kunun Nugroho as Hidayat
- Irwan Chandra as Fery
- Ario Prabowo as Vincent
- Dzeko Chandra as Aldo
- Jovarel Callum as Richie
- Rachquel Nesia as Menantu perempuan Arab

== Release ==
Disney+ Hotstar acquired the distribution rights of the film, releasing it on 2 October 2020.

== Accolades ==
Award	Date	Category	Recipient	Result	Ref.
Indonesian Film Festival	10 November 2021	Best Picture	Deddy Mizwar	Nominated	
Indonesian Film Festival	10 November 2021	Best Director	Aria Kusumadewa	Nominated	
