= Dear Nathan =

- Theatrical release poster
- Directed by: Indra Gunawan
- Screenplay by: Bagus Bramanti; Gea Rexy
- Based on: Dear Nathan by Erisca Febriani
- Produced by: Gope T. Samtani
- Starring: Amanda Rawles; Jefri Nichol; Surya Saputra; Rayn Wijaya; Diandra Agatha; Beby Tsabina; Denira Wiraguna; Adi Virsa Prayudi
- Cinematography: Ivan Anwal Pane
- Edited by: Ryan Purwoko
- Music by: Andhika Triyadi
- Production company: Rapi Films
- Release dates: 23 March 2017 (Indonesia); 3 September 2020 (Netflix)
- Running time: 99 minutes
- Country: Indonesia
- Language: Indonesian
- Box office: Rp26 billion

Dear Nathan is an Indonesian coming of age romantic drama film which was released on 23 March 2017 and directed by Indra Gunawan. It stars Amanda Rawles and Jefri Nichol. Adapted from the novel of the same name by Erisca Febriani. The film was followed by sequels Dear Nathan: Hello Salma (2018) and Dear Nathan: Thank You Salma (2022).

== Plot ==
Salma is a student who just transferred to Garuda High School. Salma, a disciplined student, was late for school on her first day. This incident made her acquainted with Nathan, a student who is known to be naughty, delinquent, and likes to fight.

At first, Salma, who was quite selective in making friends, chose to stay away from Nathan. But Nathan openly showed his attitude that he liked Salma and did various things to be with Salma.

Seeing all the things Nathan did, Salma's heart, which was initially indifferent, slowly melts. In addition, Nathan and Salma often met on various occasions. Gradually, Salma, who is known as a diligent and active student in the organization, falls in love with Nathan, who has a very different personality from hers.

Salma started trying to change Nathan for the better. For Salma's sake, Nathan was determined to change his bad character and behavior. They started going through high school courtship.

However, Salma and Nathan's relationship also faces many problems, from Nathan's ex-girlfriend, who still loves him, his past, and his family problems. Their relationship was marked by on-and-off events. Until one day, Salma was really determined to leave Nathan after catching him with his ex-girlfriend at home.

Besides his troubled relationship with Salma, his mother had a mental disorder since Nathan's twin brother, Daniel, died in a fight involving Nathan several years ago. In fact, Daniel was their mother's favorite child because he was a good and obedient child.

Since then, his mother had to be treated in a mental hospital. Every time Nathan came to visit, his mother always thought that Nathan was Daniel. Even though he was sad, Nathan still pretended to be Daniel so he could still meet his mother because his mother really hated Nathan, whom she thought was the reason why Daniel was killed.

On the other hand, Nathan's father chose to leave their family and remarry another woman. With all these problems, Nathan was worse. He even chose to leave home and skip school for days.

Salma, who later found out about all these things, understood what caused Nathan to often behave badly at school. In the end, Salma, who still loves Nathan, tries to help Nathan deal with his difficult times.

With Salma's support, Nathan tries to change the bad relationship he has had with his family so far. Nathan also tries to make peace with his past and feelings of guilt towards his mother and twin. After going through all that, Nathan and Salma finally try to come back and accept each other.

== Cast ==
- Jefri Nichol as Nathan Januar Prasetyo / Daniel Januar Prasetyo (dual role)
- Amanda Rawles as Salma Alvira
- Rayn Wijaya as Aldo
- Diandra Agatha as Rahma
- Beby Tsabina as Afifah
- Chicco Kurniawan as Jaya
- Faiz Fadhil as Adit
- Kevin Ardilova as Kevin
- Surya Saputra as Ardi: Nathan's father
- Karina Suwandi as Salma's mother
- Ayu Dyah Pasha as Nathan's mother
- Raquel Katie Larkin as Dinda
- Denira Wiraguna as Seli
- Karlina Inawati as Aunt Ijah
- Sri Hartini as Nathan's grandmother
- Nadia Naufel as Astrid
- Ravil Prasetya as Deni
- Johan Sebastian as Mr. Teacher
- Dian Sidik as Kopaja driver assistant
- Ike Mutih as Nurse Dina

== Release ==
Dear Nathan was theatrically released in Indonesia on 23 March 2017. The film's trailer premiered on 7 January 2017. The film was also released through the streaming service Netflix in selected countries on 3 September 2020.

== Accolades ==
Date	Award	Category	Recipient	Result
2017	Bandung Film Festival	Commendable Actor	Jefri Nichol	Nominated
2017	Maya Awards	Best New Actor	Jefri Nichol	Won
