= Bidadari Surgamu =

Indonesian drama television series

- Genre: Romance; Family drama
- Created by: Sridhar Jetty
- Screenplay by: Ashvery Kumar
- Story by: Ashvery Kumar
- Directed by: Anurag Vaishnav
- Starring: Salshabilla Adriani; Rizky Nazar; Dosma Hazenbosch; Rezca Syam; Lian Firman
- Theme music composer: Anang Hermansyah; Krisdayanti
- Opening theme: "Aku Wanita Biasa" by Krisdayanti
- Ending theme: "Aku Wanita Biasa" by Krisdayanti
- Composer: Samuel Pratama
- Country of origin: Indonesia
- Original language: Indonesian
- No. of seasons: 1
- No. of episodes: 442

Production
- Executive producer: David S. Suwarto
- Producer: Sridhar Jetty
- Cinematography: Zeta A. Maphilindo
- Editors: Roby; Wewen; Nalz; Sandy; Agung; Said; Rucils
- Camera setup: Multi-camera
- Running time: 60 minutes
- Production companies: SinemArt; Ess Jay Studios

Original release
- Network: SCTV
- Release: 13 March 2023 – 9 June 2024

Bidadari Surgamu (transl. Your Heavenly Angel) is an Indonesian television drama series that aired from 13 March 2023 on SCTV and streams on Vidio. The show was produced by Sridhar Jetty under SinemArt and Ess Jay Studios. The series starred Salshabilla Adriani, Rizky Nazar, Dosma Hazenbosch, and Rezca Syam. Its last episode telecast on 9 June 2024.

== Plot ==
The story begins with the moment when Sakinah blows out her birthday candles, a woman who was deliberately entrusted by her biological mother in front of Haidar and Hamidah's house. Sakinah was also cared for by both of them. Sakinah never knew who her parents were, but every year her biological mother always sent Sakinah a birthday present. That night, Lauza, Sakinah's biological mother—secretly kept the gift in front of Haidar's house fence. Sakinah saw the reflection of her biological mother.

Sakinah immediately went after her biological mother. This chase was recorded by a neighbor. However, when Sakinah wanted to see the recording, the cellphone was run over by Denis' car. As an apology, Denis invited Sakinah to go to save the recording. However, on the way, Denis' car broke down on a deserted road.

At that time, a raid was being carried out on perverted couples by the police. Long story short, Sakinah and Denis got married. Even though many people disagree with this marriage, Denis and Sakinah's marriage continues. Lauza who knows that her biological child is married to her stepson, Denis is very happy to be close to her biological child. Sakinah's marriage was unhappy and full of stress. Apart from the fact that Denis still loves his ex, Flora, Denis' family doesn't like Sakinah. Plus, Lauza still wants to keep her relationship with Sakinah a secret.

== Cast ==
=== Main ===
- Salshabilla Adriani as Sakinah
- Rizky Nazar sebagai as Denis Pratama
- Dosma Hazenbosch as Namira Andini
- Rezca Syam as Andrew Putra Pratama

=== Recurring ===
- Mike Lucock as Salim Kurniawan
- Yati Octavia as Lauza
- Pangky Suwito as Mario Pratama
- Josephine Firmstone as Flora Euphrasia
- Virza Oreel as Kania Pratama
- Karlina Inawati as Hamidah Andini
- Yabes Yosia as Fadil Sahrial
- Yuzar Nazaros as Haidar Kurniawan
- Michelle Joan as Sofia Indahwati
- Muthia Datau as Putri
- Sebryan Yosvien as Ryan
- Krishna Keitaro as Azzam
- Emilia as Mimi
- Alene Vynita as Tyas
- Mentari De Marelle as Dini Amalia & Vera
- Lian Firman as Rangga Brawijaya
- Tasman Taher as Bram Wijayamoko
- Rika Fransiska as Shinta
- Voke Victoria as Aurel
- Risma Aw Aw as Alya Dwita
- Wibby Velia as Intan
- Jihad Alfurqon as Dimas
- Mona Ratuliu as Manda
- Atharrazka Akmal as baby Fajar
- Syafa sebagai as baby Bulan
- Abygail Cahaya as baby Banyu
- Rini Astri Melvin as Teti
- Shandy Ishabella as Cherry
- Irsyadillah as Radit
- Syifa Hadju as Angel
- Rantya Affandy as young Lauza
- Rian Rizki as young Haidar
- Ray Sahetapy as Lauza's father
- Sulaiman Rifai as Yogi
- Fadel Levy as Farel
- Arry Febrian as Kamil
- Lulu Zakaria as Angel's mother
- Leonardy Kusuma as Tiko
- Sherly Dwi Fitri as Linda
- Vera Maureen as Marni
- Puja Lauda as Eva
- Dinda Ramadhani as Windi
- Resyakila as Zafira (Zaa)
- Yanuar Awal Ramadhani as Bram's henchmen
- Hilman Saputra Pangemanan as Bram's henchmen

== Production ==
=== Casting ===
Rizky Nazar was cast as the male lead, Denis. In May 2023, Syifa Hadju joined the show as Angel.

== Soundtrack ==
| Title | Singer | Lyrics | Label |
|---|---|---|---|
| "Aku Wanita Biasa" | Krisdayanti | Anang Hermansyah, and Krisdayanti | Royal Prima Musikindo |
| "Aku Menunggumu" | Dudy Oris | Fery Hudaya | DH Production Indonesia |
| "Cinta Luar Biasa" | Andmesh Kamaleng | Faisal Resi | HITS Records |
| "Rasa Cinta Ini" | Ghea Indrawari | Bemby Noor, and Mario Kacang | HITS Records |

Notes

Main theme song

== Reception ==
In the first episode, it was ranked fourth with a TVR 3,5 and audience share 17,0%.

== Nominations & Awards ==
| Year | Awards | Category | Recipient | Results | Ref. |
|---|---|---|---|---|---|
| 2023 | Indonesian Television Awards 2023 | Program Primetime Drama Terpopuler | Bidadari Surgamu | Nominated | |
| 2023 | Indonesian Television Awards 2023 | Aktor Sinetron Terpopuler | Rizky Nazar | Won | |
| 2023 | Indonesian Television Awards 2023 | Aktris Sinetron Terpopuler | Salshabilla Adriani | Nominated | |
| 2023 | Indonesian Television Awards 2023 | Aktris Sinetron Terpopuler | Syifa Hadju | Nominated | |
| 2023 | Infotainment Awards 2023 | Best Male Character | Rizky Nazar | Nominated | |
| 2023 | Infotainment Awards 2023 | Best Female Character | Salshabilla Adriani | Nominated | |
| 2023 | SCTV Awards 2023 | Sinetron Paling Ngetop | Bidadari Surgamu | Nominated | |
| 2023 | SCTV Awards 2023 | Soundtrack Sinetron Paling Ngetop | "Aku Wanita Biasa" by Krisdayanti | Nominated | |
| 2023 | SCTV Awards 2023 | Aktor Utama Paling Ngetop | Rizky Nazar | Nominated | |
| 2023 | SCTV Awards 2023 | Aktris Utama Paling Ngetop | Salshabilla Adriani | Nominated | |
| 2023 | SCTV Awards 2023 | Aktris Pendamping Paling Ngetop | Dosma Hazenbosch | Nominated | |
| 2023 | SCTV Awards 2023 | Aktris Pendamping Paling Ngetop | Syifa Hadju | Won | |
| 2023 | SCTV Awards 2023 | Aktor Aktris Anak Paling Ngetop | Krishna Keitaro | Nominated | |
| 2024 | Indonesian Television Awards 2024 | Program Primetime Drama Terpopuler | Bidadari Surgamu | Nominated | |
| 2024 | Indonesian Television Awards 2024 | Aktor Televisi Terpopuler | Rizky Nazar | Nominated | |
| 2024 | Indonesian Television Awards 2024 | Aktris Televisi Terpopuler | Salshabilla Adriani | Nominated | |
