= Amanda Rawles =

Indonesian actress

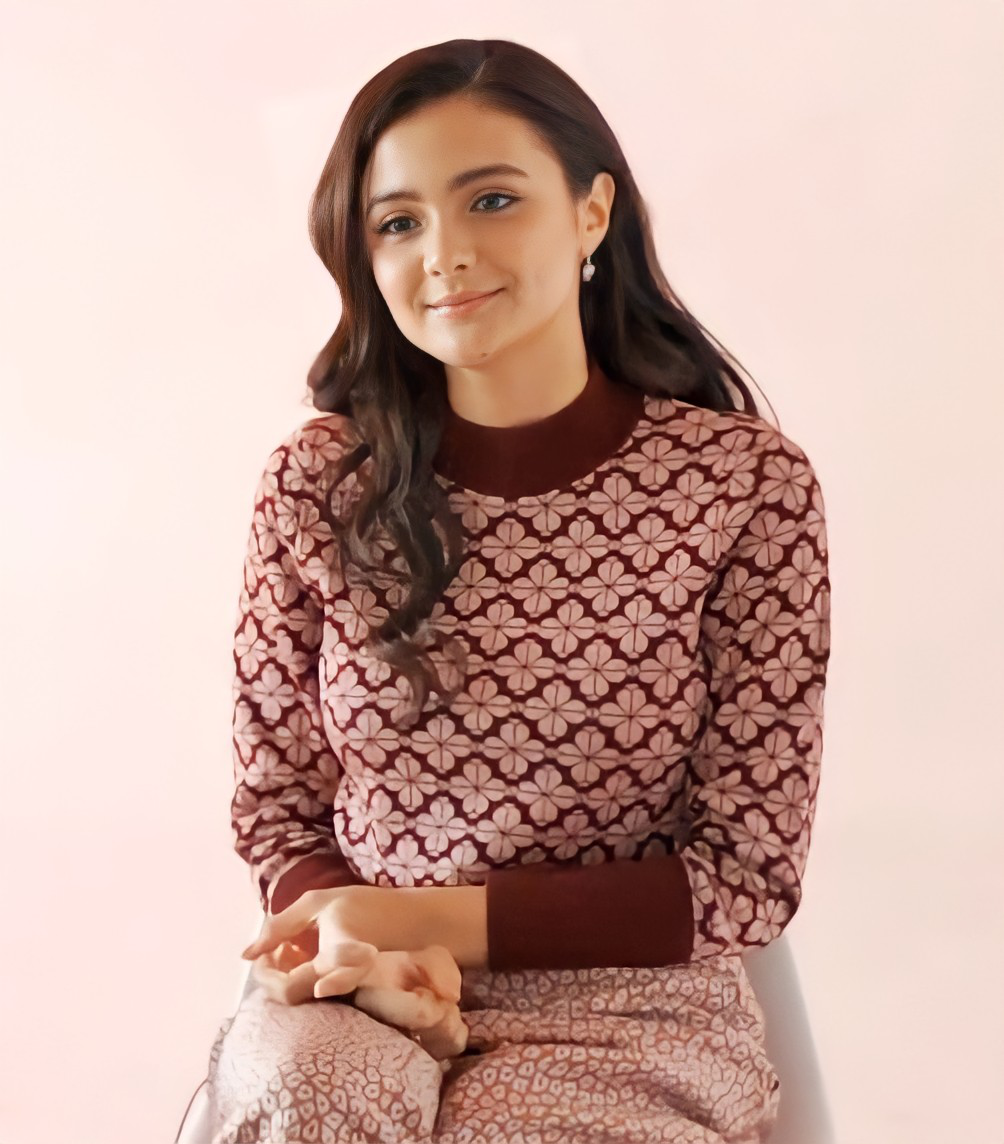
- Rawles in 2020
- Born: Jakarta, Indonesia
- Education: Macquarie University
- Occupations: Actress; model
- Years active: 2013–present

Amanda Rawles is an Indonesian actress of Australian descent.

== Early life and education ==
Amanda Rawles was born in Jakarta, Indonesia.

Rawles continued her education in high school through home schooling due to her busy career in acting.

In March 2020, Rawles underwent a foundation studies university program aimed at preparing students for undergraduate courses, for a four-month bachelor's degree at Macquarie University, Sydney. In 2021, Rawles settled in Australia to continue her tertiary education at Macquarie University for a bachelor's degree in communication sciences. She took this major because it was in line with her career in the entertainment industry.

== Career ==
=== Acting ===
Rawles' film career began with a supporting role in the film 7 Hari Menembus Waktu (2015). After starring in several other films, Rawles played the female lead in Promise (2017).

She then played one of two leading roles as Salma in Dear Nathan and its two sequels, paired with Jefri Nichol as Nathan.

=== Other activities ===
In 2017, Rawles published a book of poetry and prose titled Yang Terlupakan.

In 2020 Rawles did the musical arrangement for the "Theme of Prontera" on the album Ragnarok Forever Love: Cinta Abadi. This is a soundtrack to accompany the new web series Cinta Abadi, which was released on 11 September 2019 on YouTube, in which Rawles plays the character Renata. The music is used in the online game Ragnarok Online, Prontera City being one of the main cities in the game.

== Awards and nominations ==
Year	Award	Category	Work	Result	Ref.
2018	Indonesian Box Office Movie Awards	Gold Medal (with Jefri Nichol)	Jailangkung	Won	
2019	Bandung Film Festival	Commendable Lead Actress – Film	Dear Nathan: Hello Salma	Nominated	
2021	Bandung Film Festival	Commendable Actress – Web Series	Skripsick: Derita Mahasiswa Abadi	Nominated	

== Filmography ==
=== Film ===
Key
†	Denotes productions that have not yet been released

Year	Title	Role	Notes
2015	7 Hari Menembus Waktu	Cleo	
2015	99% Muhrim: Get Married 5	Warehouse clearance event	
2015	Ayah Menyayangi Tanpa Akhir	Diva	
2016	Dubsmash	Andhien	
2016	ILY from 38.000 Ft	Tiara	
2017	Promise	Kanya	
2017	Dear Nathan	Salma Alvira	
2017	Jailangkung	Bella Kirana Djojonegoro	
2017	A: Aku, Benci, & Cinta	Athala	
2017	One Fine Day	Anisa	
2018	London Love Story 3	dr. Mia	
2018	The Perfect Husband	Ayla	
2018	Jailangkung 2	Bella Kirana Djojonegoro	
2018	Something in Between	Maya	
2018	Something in Between	Laras	
2018	Dear Nathan: Hello Salma	Salma Alvira	
2019	Sunyi	Maggie	
2019	Bebas	Lila	
2021	Notebook	Rintik Saraswati	
2021	A World Without	Salina	
2022	Dear Nathan: Thank You Salma	Salma Alvira	
2022	Merindu Cahaya de Amstel	Khadija Veenhoven	
2022	Ranah 3 Warna	Raisa Kamila	
2023	The Day Before The Wedding	Clara	
2023	Bukannya Aku Tidak Mau Nikah	Manda	
2024	A Brother and 7 Siblings	Maurin	
2025	Siapa Dia	Rintik	

Television films include:

- Pempek Betawi Rasa Cinta (2016)
- OB Cantik Jadi Sekretaris Bos Galak (2016) as Iren
- Selembut Cinta di Pancake Durian (2016) as Rani
- Asap Sate Pembawa Rindu (2016) as Ratna
- Cinta Dalam Kue Mochi (2016) as Gita
- Cantik Cantik Supir Bemo (2016) as Halimah
- Cintaku Tak Sedingin Es Cream (2016) as Evi
- Penarik Bajaj Kece Badai (2017)

=== Web series ===
Year	Title	Role	Notes
2019	Running Girl	Amanda	
2019	Cinta Abadi	Renata	
2019	Key to Happiness: From OPPO Reno 2 F	Key	
2020	Gossip Girl Indonesia	Serena Darsono	
2020	Titisan: Thalia Pewaris Tahta Iblis	Thalia	
2021	Skripsick: Derita Mahasiswa Abadi	Bunga	
2021	Love is a Story	Gendis	
2022	Virgin Mom	Kanaya	
2022	No Ordinary Love	Raia	
2023	Virgin Mom 2	Kanaya	

=== Television series ===
Year	Title	Role	Notes
2013	Somad	Sasmita	Debut
2013	Bersama Meraih Mimpi	Kartika	
2015	Duyung	Maira	
2016	Rahasia Suara Hati	Susi	
2016	Rahasia Suara Hati	Adel	

== Discography ==
List of singles as lead artist
Title	Year	Album
"Theme of Prontera"	2020	Ragnarok Forever Love: Cinta Abadi (Theme Song)

== Books ==
- Rawles, Amanda (2017). Yang Terlupakan. Jakarta: Bumi Semesta Media. ISBN 9786026940711.
