= Beby Tsabina =

Indonesian actress (born 2002)

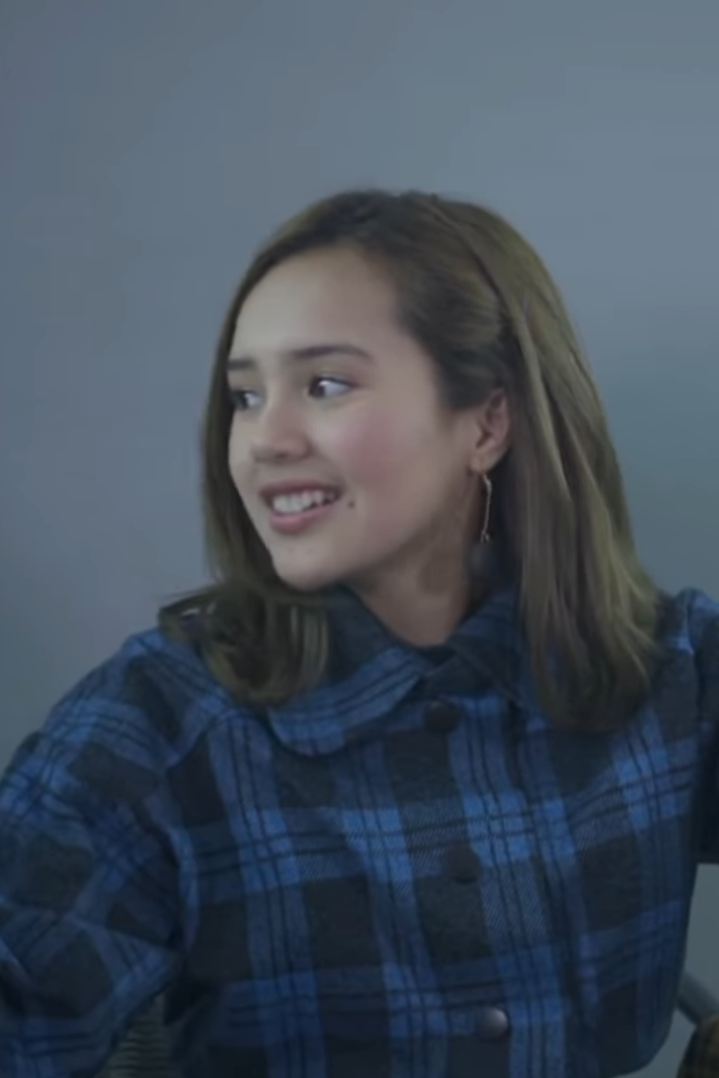
- Beby Tsabina in 2018
- Born: Cut Putri Tshabina; October 27, 2002 (age 23); Banda Aceh, Aceh, Indonesia
- Education: Western Michigan University
- Occupations: Celebrity, model, singer
- Years active: 2015–present
- Spouse: Rizki Aulia Rahman Natakusumah (m. 2024)
- Family: Achmad Dimyati Natakusumah (Father-in-law); Irna Narulita (Mother-in-law)

Cut Putri Tshabina (born 27 October 2002), better known as Beby Tsabina, is an Indonesian actress, model, and singer. She first gained recognition for her role as Santi in the television series Anak Jalanan and received widespread acclaim for her role as Ruby in the television series Mermaid in Love. Beby Tsabina made her feature film debut in 2017 by acting in Dear Nathan and landed her first leading role in a feature film in 2020, playing Gita Savitri in Rentang Kisah.

== Early life and education ==
Beby Tsabina was born in Banda Aceh on 27 October 2002. She is the second of three siblings of H. Teuku Darmawan and Eny Marlinda. Her mother was a model in Aceh. She has an older brother named Teuku Atha and a younger sister named Cut Keysha.

Beby Tsabina completed her secondary education through homeschooling and pursued higher education in Management at Jakarta International College. She completed her undergraduate at Western Michigan University, graduating with Summa Cum Laude honors and earning a bachelor's degree in Business Administration degree.

== Career ==
Initially, Beby Tsabina participated in a casting selection in her hometown, Aceh, when she was in the fourth grade. She was selected for a role, but the production of the project was canceled. Later, a director invited her to attend several more casting calls in Jakarta when she was 12 years old. She was offered a supporting role in the television series Alphabet for one episode and in Anak Menteng in 2015. Beby Tsabina started to be famous when she portrayed the character Santi in the popular television series Anak Jalanan.

Beby Tsabina gained widespread recognition as an actress after playing the role of Ruby in the television series Mermaid in Love in 2016. In 2017, she ventured into the film industry, playing the roles of Afifah in Dear Nathan and Jessie Qirasasmita in Susah Sinyal. The following year, she starred in three films titled #TemanTapiMenikah, Reuni Z, and Rompis the Movie, as well as one television series, Catatan Harian Aisha.

Beby Tsabina landed her first leading role in 2020, playing Gita Savitri in the biopic film, Rentang Kisah. This role earned her two favorite categories and one best category at the 2021 Indonesian Movie Actors Awards, marking her first award in the acting world. Throughout 2021, she remained quite active, starring in four films, three of which were leading roles. Additionally, she appeared in the web series Antares, portraying the character Zea, which was commercially successful and continued for a second season.

== Filmography ==
=== Film ===
Year	Title	Role	Note
2017	Dear Nathan	Afifah	
2017	Susah Sinyal	Jessie Qirasasmita	
2018	#TemantapiMenikah	Mila	
2018	Reuni Z	Mandy	
2018	Rompis	Meira	
2020	Rentang Kisah	Gita Savitri	
2021	Persahabatan Bagai Kepompong	Paula	
2021	Layla Majnun	Narmina	
2021	Love Knots	Rara	
2021	Eyang Ti	Nares	
2022	Naga Naga Naga	Monaga	
2023	Scandal Makers	Karenina Kurnia / Karin	
2023	Cherish & Ruelle	Cherish	
2023	My Idiot Brother 2: Angel, Kami Semua Punya Mimpi	Angel	
2024	Warkop DKI Kartun		Voice
2024	Film ketiga trilogi Buya Hamka	Raham remaja	
2024	Rompis 2 the Movie	Meira	
2025	Setetes Embun Cinta Niyala (Promised Hearts)	Niyala	

Note

Not yet released

=== Short film ===
Year	Title	Role	Note
2021	Quoi de Neuf		

=== Teleivison series ===
Year	Title	Role	Note
2015	Anak Jalanan	Santi	Debut work
2016	Alphabet	Beby	one episode
2016	Anak Menteng	Pacar Aldi	
2016	Mermaid in Love	Ruby	
2016	Sinema Indosiar	Rindu	Episode: Ayahku Menghalalkan Segala Cara Demi Uang
2017	Sinema Indosiar	Almira	Episode: Ibuku Kuli Bangunan
2017	Bawang Merah Bawang Putih	Merah Saraswati	
2017	Best Friends Forever	Tari	
2018	Catatan Harian Aisha	Luna	

=== Web series ===
Year	Title	Role	Note
2018	Rompis	Meira	
2021	Antares	Zeanne Queensha Bratadikara	
2021	Susah Sinyal the Series	Jessie	Episode 6
2022	Antares Season 2	Zeanne Queensha Bratadikara	
2023	Dua Wajah Arjuna	Caramel	
2024	The Perfect Strangers	Alexa Hermawan / Alena	

=== Television film ===
- Satu Kakak, Dua Cinta (2017)
- Sudah Jatuh, Tertimpa Cinta (2017)
- Satu Pertanyaan untuk Mantan (2017)
- Me & Enyak Go to Korea (2020)

=== Clip video ===
- "Terlalu Berharap" – Rossa (2022) theme song Love Knots

== Discography ==
=== Single ===
- "Cause You" (2018, theme song Rompis)
- "Muda" (2022, theme song Naga Naga Naga)

== Awards and nominations ==
Year	Awards	Category	Nominated works	Result
2021	2021 Indonesian Movie Actors Awards	Best Actress	Rentang Kisah	Nominated
2021	2021 Indonesian Movie Actors Awards	Most Favorite Actress	Rentang Kisah	Won
2021	2021 Indonesian Movie Actors Awards	Best Couple (with Donny Damara)	Rentang Kisah	Won
2021	2021 Indonesian Movie Actors Awards	Most Favorite Couple (with Donny Damara)	Rentang Kisah	Won
2022	2022 Indonesian Journalists Film Festival	Best Supporting Actress in the Comedy Film Genre	Naga Naga Naga	Nominated
