= Dear Nathan: Thank You Salma =

- Directed by: Kuntz Agus
- Written by: Bagus Bramanti
- Based on: Thank You Salma by Erisca Febriani
- Produced by: Gope T. Samtani
- Starring: Jefri Nichol; Amanda Rawles; Ardhito Pramono; Indah Permatasari; Susan Sameh
- Cinematography: Arfian
- Edited by: Ryan Purwoko; Wildan M Cahyo
- Music by: Andhika Triyadi
- Production companies: Rapi Films; Screenplay Films
- Release dates: 13 January 2022 (Indonesia); 21 April 2022 (Netflix)
- Running time: 112 minutes
- Country: Indonesia
- Language: Indonesian

Dear Nathan: Thank You Salma is a 2022 Indonesian romantic drama film directed by Kuntz Agus and produced by Rapi Films and Screenplay Films. It is the third and final film in the Dear Nathan trilogy, a sequel to Dear Nathan (2017) and Dear Nathan: Hello Salma (2018). Dear Nathan: Thank You Salma was theatrically released in Indonesia on 13 January 2022, before being released on Netflix in selected countries on 21 April 2022.

== Plot ==
Salma and Nathan are college students. Salma is a student majoring in Indonesian literature, while Nathan is majoring in engineering. The romantic story of Nathan and Salma is colored by their respective activities in the world of social activism. However, the two differ in principles and opinions. Salma is more inclined to voice her views online, while Nathan prefers to take to the streets. Salma fears for Nathan's safety participating in demonstrations.

Nathan's classmate on campus, Zanna, had become a victim of sexual abuse by a friend. The father of the abuser was a campus leader, which made Zanna afraid to report the case. He chose to remain silent and joined the Love Yourself community, which led him to meet Rebecca, Nathan's friend in high school. After learning what Zanna had experienced, Rebecca immediately asks Nathan for help in resolving the case so that Zanna would get justice and be able to forget her trauma. Nathan agrees to help solve the case.

Salma admires a musician called Afkar, and becomes close to him. On her birthday, she invites Afkar to her party. Nathan sees them together at the party and is consumed with jealousy; he rushed home and does not give Salma her present. In the end the three of them finally meet, and Afkar becomes a close friend of Nathan; however, Nathan feels that he must compete with Afkar and look better than Afkar in front of Salma. Salma wants Nathan to become more mature. He has to convince Salma more that he really loves Salma.

Nathan, Rebecca, Salma, and Afkar all help each other to solve Zanna's problem, collecting enough evidence so that they can demand that the harasser be removed from the campus so that Zanna can study safely. However, the harasser had threatened Zanna that her scholarship would be revoked if she reported the case. Finally, Zanna musters up the courage to speak up on the campus, with the help of her friends, and her report is accepted to be processed by the college. Zanna does not lose her scholarship, but Zanna's request to expel the harasser from the campus was not approved. Zanna does not accept this either, and after further discussion with other leaders, the perpetrator's father finally agrees to have his son transferred to another campus. Salma's relationship with Nathan improves through the experience.

== Cast ==
- Jefri Nichol as Nathan Januar Prasetyo
- Amanda Rawles as Salma Alvira
- Susan Sameh as Rebecca
- Indah Permatasari as Zanna
- Ardhito Pramono as Afkar
- Sani Fahreza as Rio
- Diandra Agatha as Rahma
- Rendi Jhon as Deni
- Maya Hasan as Mrs. Dewi
- Fuad Idris as Zanna's father
- Surya Saputra as Ardi: Nathan's father
- Karina Suwandi as Asti: Salma's mother
- Sitha Soerjo as chief dean
- Willem Bevers as Rio's father
- Andovi da Lopez as Deni's friend in the student association
- Hesti Lauder as a psychologist
- Prabu Revolusi as a campus official
- Keisya Levronka as Salma's friend
- Michael James Olindo as a demonstrator student who is carried by Nathan
- Sunar Samtani as vice dean

== Production ==
The film is based on the novel Thank You Salma by Erisca Febriani.

The actors Amanda Rawles, Jefri Nichol, and Ardhito Pramono were announced to be starring in August 2020. Nichol and Rawles had starred in the preceding two Dear Nathan films as Nathan and Salma, and Rawles said that the first one was her stepping stone to her film acting career in Indonesia.

Kuntz Agus directed the film, which was produced by Rapi Films and Screenplay Films.

== Themes ==
The theme of sexual violence is prominent in the film.

== Release ==
Distribution was handled by Hypeabis.id. The film's trailer was released on 14 December 2021, with special screenings held in selected cinemas in 10 cities on 9 January 2022. Dear Nathan: Thank You Salma was theatrically released in Indonesia on 13 January 2022.

The film was also released through the streaming service Netflix in selected countries on 21 April 2022.

== Reception ==
The audience numbers were high in cinemas, reaching 300,000 in six days.
