= Catatan Hati Seorang Istri =

Indonesian drama television series

- Genre: Melodrama; Romance; Family
- Based on: Catatan Hati Seorang Istri by Asma Nadia
- Written by: Evelyn Afnilia
- Directed by: Sondang Pratama
- Starring: Naysila Mirdad; Baskara Mahendra; Amanda Rigby; Shindy Huang; Emil Kusumo; Hazman Al-Idrus; Audya Ananta
- Theme music composer: M. Aditia Sahid, Okto Ahadi
- Ending theme: "Muak" by Aruma
- Country of origin: Indonesia
- Original language: Indonesian
- No. of seasons: 1
- No. of episodes: 8

Production
- Executive producer: Clarissa Tanoesoedibjo
- Producers: Rick Soerafani; Thaleb Wirachman Wahjudi; Emilka Chaidir
- Camera setup: Multi-camera
- Running time: 30 minutes
- Production company: MNC Pictures

Original release
- Network: Vision+; Tencent Video
- Release: 22 August – 3 October 2025

Catatan Hati Seorang Istri (English: Wife's Secret Diary) is an Indonesian television series produced by MNC Pictures which aired from 22 August 2025 to 3 October 2025 on Vision+ and Tencent Video based on the novel of the same title by Asma Nadia, and reboot of RCTI's Catatan Hati Seorang Istri. It stars Naysila Mirdad, and Baskara Mahendra.

== Plot ==
Hana is faced with inner turmoil due to the conflicts that arise in her life.

Furthermore, Hana has a caring husband and an elementary school daughter. Their married life appears harmonious from the outside.

However, behind her husband's caring demeanor, Hana discovers clues that point to the possibility of his infidelity. This, of course, shocks Hana.

Along with these clues, Hana finds herself increasingly confused as her two close friends, Naomi and Dini, face their own marital problems.

Indirectly, these three friends are faced with different marital crises, ranging from infidelity and emotional abuse to social pressure to be the perfect wife.

== Cast ==
- Naysila Mirdad as Hanna Wulandari
- Baskara Mahendra as Pram Aditya
- Amanda Rigby as Dini
- Shindy Huang as Naomi
- Emil Kusumo as Daniel Kurniawan
- Reza Andryanto as Vino
- Audya Ananta as Karina Cantika
- Arsyla Shakila as Rossa
- Raffan Al Aryan as Niko
- Zahra Macapagal as Asri
- Ghina Nisa as Nurma
- Hazman Al-Idrus as Wisnu
- Maria Jessica as Wanda

== Production ==
=== Development ===
In April 2025, Vision+ announced a reboot of Catatan Hati Seorang Istri.

=== Casting ===
Naysilla Mirdad to play female lead, Hanna. Shindy Huang was signed to play Naomi. Audy Ananta was cast as Karin.
