= Ardhito Pramono =

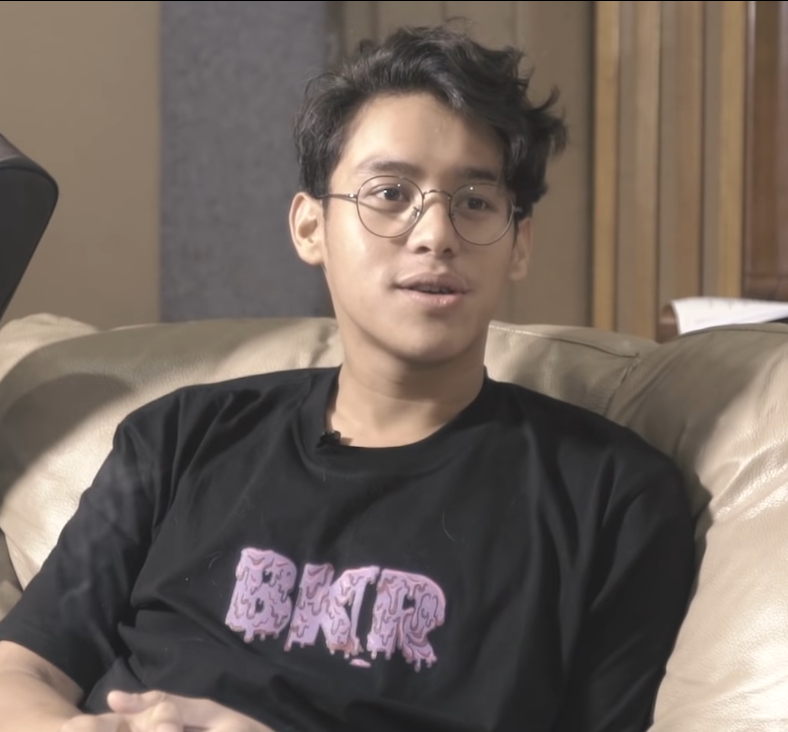
- Pramono in 2020
- Born: May 22, 1995 (age 31); Jakarta, Indonesia
- Occupations: Singer; songwriter; actor
- Years active: 2013–present
- Spouse: Jeanneta Sanfadelia (m. 2019; div. 2023)
- Children: 1
- Musical career
- Genres: Pop; jazz
- Instruments: Vocals; guitar; piano; drum
- Label: Sony Music Entertainment Indonesia

Ardhito Rifqi Pramono (born May 22, 1995) is an Indonesian singer, songwriter and actor. He has also been a creative planner and music director. He has been involved in working on several short films and web series.

== Early life ==
Ardhito Rifqi Pramono was born in Jakarta, Indonesia, on May 22, 1995. He has a younger sister named Adhania Pramono. Pramono has always been interested in music since he was a child. He is a jazz lover and a fan of 40s songs. More than just composing songs, he can also play musical instruments such as the guitar, piano and drums. He started composing music in 2013, when he was still studying at JMC Academy, Australia, in the Film Department.

After graduating from JMC Academy, Pramono worked at his father's company, which worked on aircraft maintenance. A year later, he was selected as one of the Top 6 on MTV Indonesia VJ Hunt.

== Career ==
Pramono first appeared on YouTube in 2013 when he covered AJ Rafael's songs such as "She Was Mine". In 2014, after graduating from college, he began to gain popularity. His first single was titled "I Placed My Heart", followed by "What Do You Feel About Me". The latter became one of the most-watched songs on YouTube.

Pramono also worked at TV stations and as a DJ and a barista before deciding to become a full-time musician.

== Personal life ==
Pramono married Indonesian model Jeannetta Sanfadelia in 2019. They have a daughter, Asmara Astika Pramono, who was born on 15 June 2021.

On January 12, 2022, Pramono was arrested by police and taken into custody due to alleged possession and consumption of marijuana. He was sent to rehabilitation for six months.

On July 29, 2022, a video of a man masturbating, rumoured to be Pramono, was published on Twitter.

== Discography ==
=== Album ===
- Ardhito Pramono (2017)
- Playlist, Vol. 2 (2017)
- A letter to my 17-year-old (2019)
- Craziest thing happened in my backyard (2020)
- Wijayakusuma (2022)
- Roadtrip (2024)

=== Single ===
- I Placed My Heart
- What Do You Feel About Me
- I Can't Stop Loving You
- Tjumbuan Kasih Limba Lara
- Perlahan Menghilang (with Joan Elizabeth)
- Di Senayan
- Bulb
- The Sun
- The Message
- Malam Minggu di Jakarta (with Prilly Latuconsina)
- Bila (OST. Susah Sinyal)
- Fake Optics
- bitterlove
- say hello
- superstar
- cigarettes of ours
- fine today (OST. Nanti Kita Cerita tentang Hari Ini)
- Trash Talkin'
- 925
- Here We Go Again / Fanboi
- Plaza Avenue
- Happy
- Sudah (OST. Story of Kale: When Someone's in Love)
- I Just Couldn't Save You Tonight (bersama Aurélie Moeremans) (OST. Story of Kale: When Someone's in Love)

== Filmography ==
| Year | Title | Role | Production |
|---|---|---|---|
| 2020 | Nanti Kita Cerita Tentang Hari Ini | Kale | Visinema Pictures; IDN Media; Blibli.com; XRM Media |
| 2020 | Story of Kale: When Someone's in Love | Kale | Visinema Pictures |
| 2021 | Dear Nathan: Thank You Salma | Afkar | Rapi Films; Screenplay Films |
| 2021 | Story of Dinda: The Second Chance of Happiness | Kale | Visinema Pictures |
| TBA | Kamu Terlalu Banyak Bercanda | Kale | Visinema Pictures |

== Awards and nominations ==
| Year | Award | Category | Nomination | Result | Ref. |
|---|---|---|---|---|---|
| 2018 | Anugerah Musik Indonesia | Best of the Best Production Work | "Fake Optics" | Nominated | |
| 2018 | Anugerah Musik Indonesia | Best Vocal Jazz Performers | "Fake Optics" | Nominated | |
| 2019 | Anugerah Musik Indonesia | Best Male Solo Artis | "Bitterlove" | Nominated | |
| 2019 | Anugerah Musik Indonesia | Best Vocal Jazz Performers | "Superstar" | Nominated | |
| 2019 | Anugerah Musik Indonesia | Best Folk/Country/Ballad Production Work | "Cigarette of Ours" | Nominated | |
| 2020 | Indonesian Movie Actor Awards | Favourite Newcomer Actor | Nanti Kita Cerita Tentang Hari Ini | Won | |
| 2020 | Anugerah Musik Indonesia | Best of the Best Production Work | "Fine Today (OST. Nanti Kita Cerita tentang Hari Ini)" | Nominated | |
| 2020 | Anugerah Musik Indonesia | Best Vocal Jazz Performer | "Fine Today (OST. Nanti Kita Cerita tentang Hari Ini)" | Won | |
| 2020 | Anugerah Musik Indonesia | Best Original Soundtrack Production | "Fine Today (OST. Nanti Kita Cerita tentang Hari Ini)" | Nominated | |
| 2020 | Anugerah Musik Indonesia | Best Recording Album Producer | "Fine Today (OST. Nanti Kita Cerita tentang Hari Ini)" | Nominated | |
| 2020 | Anugerah Musik Indonesia | Best Urban Solo Artis | "Trash Talkin'" | Nominated | |
