= Paranoia (2021 film) =

- Theatrical release poster
- Directed by: Riri Riza
- Screenplay by: Jujur Prananto; Mira Lesmana; Riri Riza
- Story by: Mira Lesmana; Riri Riza
- Produced by: Mira Lesmana
- Starring: Nirina Zubir; Nicholas Saputra; Caitlin North Lewis; Lukman Sardi
- Cinematography: Teoh Gay Hian
- Edited by: W. Ichwandiardono
- Music by: Aria Prayogi
- Production company: Miles Films
- Release dates: 8 July 2021 (BiFan); 11 November 2021 (Indonesia)
- Running time: 102 minutes
- Country: Indonesia
- Language: Indonesian

Paranoia is a 2021 Indonesian drama thriller film directed and co-written by Riri Riza, produced by long-time collaborator Mira Lesmana. The film stars Nirina Zubir, Nicholas Saputra, Caitlin North Lewis and Lukman Sardi.

The film had its world premiere at the 25th Bucheon International Fantastic Film Festival in July 2021.

== Premise ==
Dina runs away with her daughter, Laura, after her abusive husband Gion gets imprisoned. However, Gion is released from the prison due to the pandemic. This situation stresses her out and she is afraid Gion will find them. Meanwhile, Raka, a mysterious man appears in their life and makes things more complicated.

== Cast ==
- Nirina Zubir as Dina
- Lukman Sardi as Gion
- Caitlin North Lewis as Laura
- Nicholas Saputra as Raka

== Release ==
Paranoia had its world premiere at the 25th Bucheon International Fantastic Film Festival. It is set to screen theatrically on 11 November 2021.

== Accolades ==
Award	Date	Category	Recipient	Result	Ref.
Indonesian Film Festival	10 November 2021	Best Picture	Mira Lesmana	Nominated	
Indonesian Film Festival	10 November 2021	Best Director	Riri Riza	Nominated	
Indonesian Film Festival	10 November 2021	Best Actress	Nirina Zubir	Nominated	
Indonesian Film Festival	10 November 2021	Best Sound	Aria Prayogi	Nominated	
Film Pilihan Tempo	20 December 2021	Best Actor	Lukman Sardi	Nominated	
