= A Perfect Fit (2021 film) =

2021 Indonesian film

- Directed by: Hadrah Daeng Ratu
- Written by: Garin Nugroho
- Starring: Nadya Arina; Refal Hady; Giorgino Abraham
- Production companies: StarVision Plus; Netflix
- Distributed by: Netflix
- Release date: 15 July 2021
- Running time: 112 minutes
- Country: Indonesia
- Language: Indonesian

A Perfect Fit is a 2021 Indonesian film directed by Hadrah Daeng Ratu, written by Garin Nugroho and starring Nadya Arina, Refal Hady and Giorgino Abraham.

== Cast ==
- Nadya Arina as Saski
- Refal Hady as Rio
- Giorgino Abraham as Deni Wijaya
- Laura Theux as Andra
- Anggika Bolsterli as Tiara
- Ayu Laksmi
- Yayu A.W. Unru
- Otig Pakis
- Unique Priscilla
- Karina Suwandhi
- Dominique Sanda
- Bryan Domani
- Wafda Saifan Lubis
- Dave Hendrik
- Ali Charisma
- Dayu Wijanto
- Arif Alfiansyah
- Abdur Arsyad
- Ahmad Ramadhan
- Mathias Muchus
- Christine Hakim

== Release ==
It was released on July 15, 2021, on Netflix streaming.

== Reception ==
Common Sense Media gave it 3 out of 5 stars.
