= Jefri Nichol =

Indonesian actor and model (born 1999)

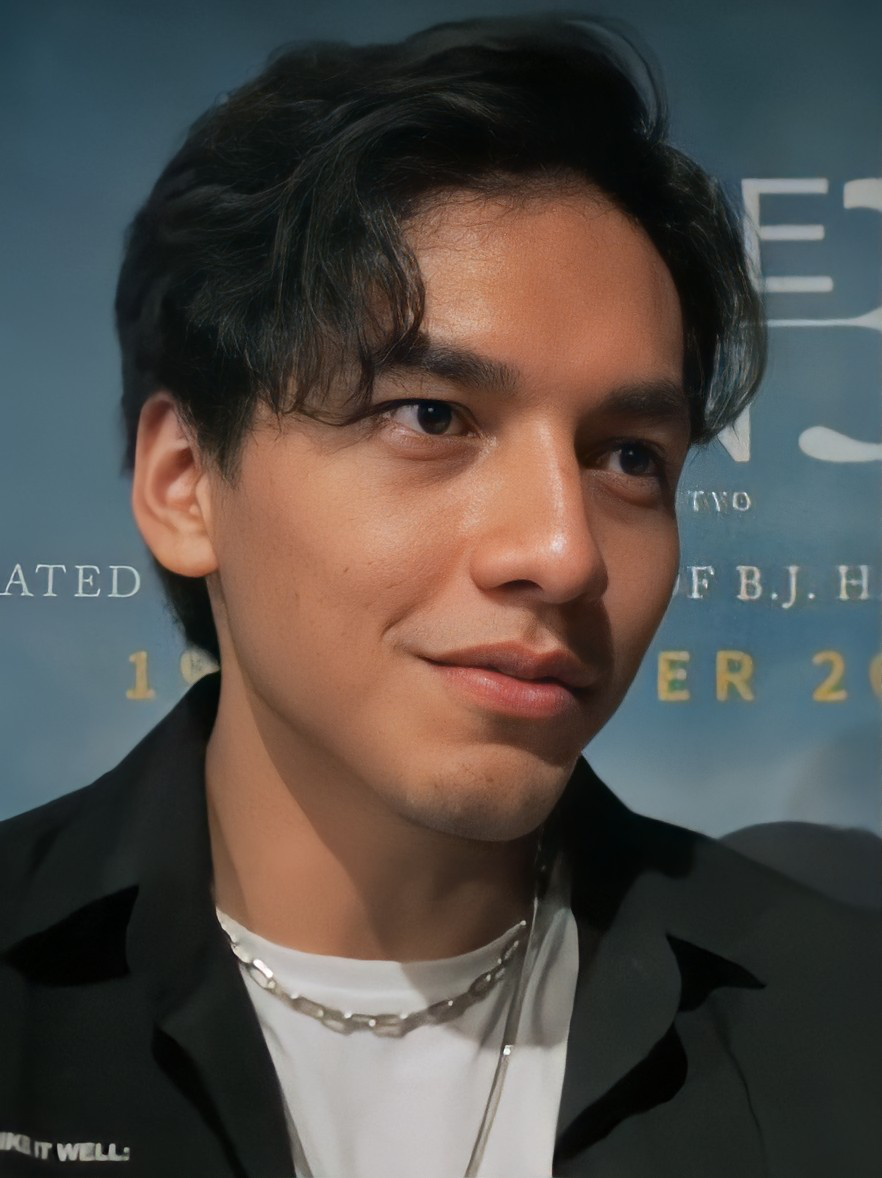
- Jefri Nichol in 2019
- Born: January 15, 1999 (age 27); Jakarta, Indonesia
- Occupations: Actor; Model
- Years active: 2013–present
- Awards: See list

Jefri Nichol (born 15 January 1999) is an Indonesian actor and model. He is widely known following his role in Dear Nathan (2017).

== Early life ==
Jefri Nichol was born on 15 January 1999 in Jakarta, Indonesia. He is the first child of Minang father and mother from Sungai Geringging, Padang Pariaman. He has a younger sister named Jessie Putri. He attended vocational school at SMK Tunas Jakasampurna majoring in technology, but due to a busy filming schedule, he decided to study at home school.

== Career ==
Jefri Nichol started his career as an advertising model and started acting by playing a supporting role in the television miniseries Kami Rindu Ayah in 2013. In 2017, he played Elzan in his first film, At Stake. One of the roles that made him rise to fame was when he became the main character in Dear Nathan, which was released in the same year.

== Personal life ==
Jefri Nichol is a sports enthusiast. His favorite sports vary, such as running, jogging, and boxing.

=== 2019 arrests ===
On 23 July 2019, Jefri Nichol was arrested by Greater Jakarta Metropolitan Regional Police at his residence for possessing marijuana. He tested positive for drugs a few hours after the arrest.

== Filmography ==
=== Film ===
Year	Title	Role	Notes
2017	At Stake	Elzan	
2017	Love Letter for Starla	Hema Chandra	Short film
2017	Dear Nathan	Nathan Januar Prasetyo	
2017	Dear Nathan	Daniel Januar Prasetyo	
2017	Jailangkung	Rama Putera	
2017	A: Aku, Benci & Cinta	Alvaro Radyana Putra	
2017	One Fine Day	Mahesa	
2017	Love Letter for Starla	Hema Chandra	
2018	Jailangkung 2	Rama Putera	
2018	Something in Between	Gema	
2018	Something in Between	Abimanyu	
2018	Dear Nathan: Hello Salma	Nathan Januar Prasetyo	
2019	The Woven Path: Perempuan Tana Humba	Narrator	Short film
2019	DreadOut	Eric	
2019	Hit & Run	Jefri	
2019	Bebas	Mia's Bully	Cameo
2019	Habibie & Ainun 3	Ahmad Notosastro	
2020	Love like the Falling Rain	Kevin	
2021	Aum!	Satriya/Surya Jatitama	
2022	Dear Nathan: Thank You Salma	Nathan Januar Prasetyo	
2022	Jakarta, City of Dreamers	Dominik	Also writer
2022	My Sassy Girl	Gian Pratama	
2022	Jailangkung: Sandekala	Rama Putera	Cameo
2022	Sri Asih	Tangguh	
2023	Tulah 6/13	Medical team	Cameo
2023	Why Do You Love Me	Danton	
2023	Mohon Doa Restu	Satya	
2023	Ali Topan	Ali Topan	
2025	Sammi, Who Can Detach His Body Parts	Sammi	Short film

=== Web series ===
Year	Title	Role	Notes
2018–2019	Line Tutorial	Kala	
2021	Paradise Garden	Kalandra Rezvan	
2022	At Stake: the Series	Elzan	
2022–2023	Love Letter for Starla: the Series	Hema Chandra	
2022–2023	Love Letter for Starla: the Series	Arya	
2023	At Stake: the Series 2	Elzan	

=== Television series ===
Year	Title	Role	Notes
2013	Kami Rindu Ayah	Boni	Debut
2015	Keluarga Garuda di Dadaku	Abe	
2016	Sinema Pintu Taubat	Adit	Episode: "Rumah untuk Bapak"
2017	Pesantren & Rock n' Roll Reborn	Ken	
2020	Catatan Harianku	Bima	Episode: "Jatuh Cinta pada Catatan Terakhir"
2020	Pesantren Rock n' Dut	Jefri	
2022	Ikatan Cinta	Himself	Cameo; promoting My Sassy Girl film
2022	IPA & IPS	Himself	Cameo; promoting My Sassy Girl film
2022	Aku Jatuh Cinta	Himself	Cameo; promoting My Sassy Girl film

=== Music video ===
Year	Title	Singer	Notes
2017	"Surat Cinta untuk Starla"	Virgoun	
2020	"Tak Bisa Bersama"	Prilly Latuconsina, Vidi Aldiano	
2021	"Apa Lagi"	Prilly Latuconsina, Andi Rianto	
2022	"Bintang di Surga"	Noah	
2022	"Merasa Indah"	Tiara Andini	
2022	"Deritaku"	David Bayu	
2022	"It's OK for Me Now"	David Bayu	
2023	"Love Me Back"	Christie	
2026	"MMG (My Mine Gueh)"	Naykilla	

== Awards and nominations ==
Year	Award	Category	Work	Result	Ref.
2017	Bandung Film Festival	Commendable Actor	Dear Nathan	Nominated	
2017	Maya Awards	Best New Actor	Dear Nathan	Won	
2018	Indonesian Box Office Movie Awards	Gold Medal (with Amanda Rawles)	Jailangkung	Won	
2019	Maya Awards	Best Actor in a Supporting Role	Habibie & Ainun 3	Nominated	
2020	Bandung Film Festival	Commendable Supporting Actor	Habibie & Ainun 3	Won	
2021	Indonesian Film Festival	Best Actor	Jakarta, City of Dreamers	Nominated	
2022	Indonesian Journalist Film Festival	Best Actor – Drama	Jakarta, City of Dreamers	Nominated	
2022	Asian Television Awards	Best Leading Male Performance – Digital	At Stake: the Series	Nominated	
2022	Indonesian Movie Actors Awards	Best Supporting Actor	Aum!	Nominated	
2022	Indonesian Movie Actors Awards	Favorite Supporting Actor	Aum!	Nominated	
