= Jakarta, City of Dreamers =

- Promotional poster for exclusive release in Bioskop Online
- Indonesian: Jakarta vs Everybody
- Directed by: Ertanto Robby Soediskam
- Written by: Ertanto Robby Soediskam
- Produced by: Ertanto Robby Soediskam
- Starring: Jefri Nichol; Wulan Guritno; Ganindra Bimo; Dea Panendra; Jajang C. Noer
- Cinematography: Akhmad Khomaini
- Edited by: Arifin Cu'unk; Panca Arka Ardhiarja
- Music by: Aghi Narottama; Tony Merle
- Production company: Pratama Pradana Picture
- Release dates: 26 November 2020 (Estonia); 19 March 2022 (Indonesia); 11 May 2023 (Netflix)
- Running time: 102 minutes
- Country: Indonesia
- Language: Indonesian

Jakarta, City of Dreamers (Indonesian title: Jakarta vs Everybody) is a film written and directed by Ertanto Robby Soediskam. The film features a number of well-known Indonesian actors such as Jefri Nichol, Wulan Guritno, Ganindra Bimo, Jajang C. Noer, and Dea Panendra. This film made it into the 24th Tallinn Black Nights Film Festival and premiered on 26 November 2020 in Estonia.

== Plot ==
Dom, who is 23 years old, decides to go abroad to Jakarta. Dom's goal of going to Jakarta is to pursue his dream of becoming a well-known actor in the capital. But the journey to become an actor is not easy. Dom has to face the difficulties of living in a metropolis. Until one day Dom met Pinkan and Radit. Dom eventually joins Radit and Pinkan who turn out to be drug couriers. Using his acting talent, Dom takes on drug courier work to avoid being suspected. With help from his boss and drug dealer (Pinkan), Dom learns to be a drug courier. Dom finally met Khansa who works as a corpse makeover, who finally made Dom realize that he wanted to pursue his dream again.

== Cast ==
- Jefri Nichol as Dominik
- Wulan Guritno as Pinkan
- Ganindra Bimo as Radit
- Dea Panendra as Khansa
- Jajang C. Noer as Ratih
- Asta Nurcahya as Uncle Pay
- Dinda Timperon as Dinda: a Drug Courier
- Paul Agusta as Uncle Roy
- Ihda Mufida as an online prostitution actor
- Fahrizal Misdana as Pay's artist
- Gerry Andrian as Barber Visitor
- Sendy Febrina as a Woman in a Red Dress
- Aditya Al as a KRL Passenger
- Cindy Robertha as a corpse
- Catherina Ginasari as a receptionist
- Lukman Hakim as a gay Friend

== Release ==
Jakarta, City of Dreamers made it into the 24th Tallinn Black Nights Film Festival (Pimedate Ööde Filmifestival, PÖFF) 2020 and premiered on 26 November 2020 in Estonia. This film planned to be shown in Indonesian cinemas on June 24, 2021. However, the scheduling has been delayed because cinemas have stopped operating as a result of the increasing cases of the COVID-19 pandemic in Indonesia. Finally, the film has a limited release on video-on-demand service Online Cinemas on March 19, 2022. It will also open online on Netflix on May 11, 2023.

The film was released through the streaming service Netflix in selected countries on May 11, 2023; and in France on June 5, 2023 as The Exocet.

== Accolades ==
Date	Award	Category	Recipient	Result
2020	Tempo Film Festival	Best Picture		Nominated
2020	Tempo Film Festival	Best Director	Ertanto Robby Soediskam	Nominated
2020	Tempo Film Festival	Best Supporting Actress	Dea Panendra	Won
2020	Tempo Film Festival	Best Supporting Actress	Jajang C. Noer	Nominated
2021	Indonesian Film Festival	Best Actor	Jefri Nichol	Nominated
2021	Indonesian Film Festival	Best Actress	Wulan Guritno	Nominated
2021	Indonesian Film Festival	Best Editing	Arifin Cu'unk & Panca Arka Ardiarja	Nominated
2022	Indonesian Journalist Film Festival	Best Actor – Drama	Jefri Nichol	Nominated
2022	Indonesian Journalist Film Festival	Best Supporting Actor – Drama	Ganindra Bimo	Nominated
2022	Bandung Film Festival	Cinema Film Commendable Editing Director	Arifin Cu'unk & Panca Arka Ardiarja	Nominated
