= Shae (singer) =

Indonesian singer and actress (born 1994)

- Also known as: Shae (Sye)
- Born: Sheryl Gething; 16 February 1994 (age 31); Rumbai, Pekanbaru, Riau, Indonesia
- Genres: Pop; Pop rock; R&B
- Occupations: Singer; actress
- Instrument: Vocals
- Years active: 2012–present
- Labels: Warner Music Indonesia
- Website: Official G+ site

Sheryl Gething (born 16 February 1994), better known by her stage name Shae is an Indonesian singer and actress. She was born to an Australian father and Indonesian mother from Riau.

== Early life ==
Shae was born Sheryl Geting on 16 February 1994 in Riau, Indonesia, to an Australian father. At an early age, she showed an interest in art and was bullied during high school.

== Career ==
Shae started her career at the age of 11 by performing in music, film, and stage. She began her singing career when she was 15 years old. Shae underwent three years in the Farabi vocal school, then went on to private lessons vocal with Katamsi Doddy. She released her first album under Warner Music Indonesia titled The First in 2012 when she was 18 years old and won her 12 platinum awards. The 2nd single of the album titled "Sayang" became a hit in Malaysia when it was released.

Her second album Seperti Magic was officially released on February 16 and producing first single "Aku Suka Kamu" which performed and also promoted in several events.

== Discography ==
=== Studio albums ===
- The First (2012)

No.	Title	Length
1.	"Cintaku Tlah Mati Untukmu"	4:09
2.	"Hangat Hangat Kuku"	4:10
3.	"Kupikir Dulu"	3:32
4.	"Putus Nyambung"	3:35
5.	"Kok Telpon Sih"	3:33
6.	"Tetaplah Senyum"	3:37
7.	"Sayang"	3:12
8.	"Aku Belum Pernah"	3:42

- Seperti Magic (2016)

=== Singles ===
- "Kok Telfon-Telfon Sih" (2012)
- "Sayang" (2013)
- "Aku Suka Kamu" (2015)
- "Gojigo (K.A.M.U.)" (2015)

== Filmography ==
=== Film ===
Year	Title	Role	Notes
2008	Basahhh...		Debut film
2014	3600 Detik	Sandra	Lead role

=== Television ===
Year	Title	Role	Notes	Broadcast
2007	Monyet Cantik	Alena	Supporting role	SCTV
2007	My Love	Ratu		Trans TV
2014	Cinta Sambal Belacan	Wanda	Telemovie	Astro Citra
