= List of Indonesian Indos =

This list is concerned with Indonesian people of mixed ancestry. The context is considered at Indo people.

== A ==
- Abimana Aryasatya, actor (Spanish descent)
- Achintya Holte Nilsen, Winner of Miss Indonesia 2017 and Top 10 Miss World 2017 (Norwegian descent)
- Adjie Massaid, actor, model and politician (Dutch descent)
- Ahmad Dhani, musician (German descent)
- Alessandra Usman, model (Turkish descent)
- Alexandra Gottardo, actress (Italian descent)
- Alice Norin, actress and DJ (Norwegian descent)
- André Joseph Guillaume Henri Kostermans, botanist (Dutch descent)
- Anggika Bolsterli, actress (Swiss descent)
- Arifin Putra, actor (German descent)
- Asmirandah, actress, singer, writer and model (Dutch descent)

== B ==
- Barry Prima, actor (Dutch descent)
- Bryan Domani, actor and singer who was former vocalist of Super 7 (German descent)
- L. B. Moerdani, General and Minister of Defence (Dutch descent)

== C ==
- Calvin Verdonk, footballer (Dutch descent)
- Carissa Putri, actress (German and Dutch descent)
- Catherine Wilson, actress, model (British and Arab descent)
- Celia Thomas, actress (American descent)
- Chelsea Islan, actress (American descent)
- Chelsea Olivia Wijaya, actress and singer (American and Chinese descent)
- Christian Sugiono, actor, model (Indonesian-German)
- Cinta Laura, actress, singer (German-Sundanese)

== D ==
- Darius Sinathriya, actor, model, sport presenter (Javanese father, Swiss mother)
- Dewi Rezer, actress, model (French-Betawi)
- Deddy Mizwar, actress, ex-vice Governor of West Java (Dutch-Betawi-Bugis)
- Dewi Sandra, singer, actress, model (Welsh-Betawi)
- Diego Muhammad, footballer (Dutch-Moluccan)
- Dean James, footballer (Javanese-Dutch)
- Dion Markx, footballer

== E ==
- Egy Maulana Vikri, footballer (Dutch-Indonesia)
- Eliano Reijnders, footballer
- Elkan Baggott, footballer (English father, Indonesian mother)
- Ernest Douwes Dekker, politician (Dutch father, Javanese-German mother)
- Emil Audero, footballer (Italian mother)
- Ezra Walian, footballer

== F ==
- Fariz RM, musician (Dutch mother)
- Ferry Sonneville, badminton player
- Nino Fernandez (German father, Indonesian mother) actor, model, comedian
- Frans Mohede, singer and actor (Dutch-Moluccan-Sangirese)
- Franz Magnis-Suseno, Jesuit

== G ==
- Gading Marten, son of Roy Marten
- Gaspar da Costa
- Gavin Kwan Adsit, footballer (Chinese-Indonesian mother, American father)
- Geert Wilders, Dutch politician. (Indo mother from Sukabumi)
- Mark-Paul Gosselaar

== H ==
- Kerenina Sunny Halim, Miss Indonesia, model (Indonesian father, American mother)
- Herman Neubronner van der Tuuk, translator and linguist
- Jesse Huta Galung, tennis player (Dutch-Batak)

== I ==
- Ilias Alhaft, footballer (Dutch and Moroccan descent)
- Indra Lesmana, singer, musician, composer
- Irfan Bachdim, footballer (Indonesian-Arab father, Dutch mother)
- Irish Bella, actress, model (Indonesian mother, Belgium father)
- Ivar Jenner, footballer

== J ==
- Jack Alan Brown, Indonesian national footballer—under 19 (English father, Indonesian mother)
- Jajang C. Noer, actress, film producer
- Jamie Aditya, musician, former video jockey
- Jay Idzes, footballer
- Jennifer Coppen, actress
- Jens Raven, footballer
- Jhon van Beukering, Indonesian footballer
- Joey Pelupessy, Indonesian footballer (Moluccan father)
- Johan Manusama, 3rd President of RSM exille.
- Jolene Marie, (Indonesian father, American mother)
- Jonas Rivanno, actor and singer
- José Abílio Osório Soares, Indonesian politician (Portuguese-East Timor)
- Joop Ave minister of tourism, post and telecommunication during Suharto's New Order era
- Jordi Amat, footballer (Dutch and Indonesian descent)
- Julie Estelle, actress
- Juwono Sudarsono, Indonesian Minister of Defense
- Justin Trudeau former Prime Minister of Canada (Malaccan and Nias ancestry)
- Justin Hubner, football Player (Dutch - Indonesian)

== K ==
- Kevin Diks, footballer (Moluccan mother)
- Kim Kurniawan, footballer (Chinese-Indonesian father, German mother)

== L ==
- Laura Gemser
- Leonardus Benjamin Moerdani
- Loa Sek Hie, colonial politician, founder of Pao An Tui
- Luna Maya, model (Austria-Javanese)
- Lydia Kandou, actress, model (Dutch-Minahasan)

== M ==
- Maarten Paes, footballer
- Manuel "Grubby" Schenkhuizen, Dutch professional gamer playing the real-time strategy games Warcraft III (WC3), Warcraft III: The Frozen Throne and Starcraft 2
- Marc Klok, footballer
- Marcel Chandrawinata, actor, model
- Mário Carrascalão, former governor of East Timor province and deputy Prime Minister of Timor-Leste
- Mariana Renata, model (French-Italian-Javanese)
- Mark-Paul Gosselaar, actor
- Maxime Bouttier, actor (French-Indonesian)
- Mathew Baker, footballer
- Maya Soetoro-Ng, half sister of Barack Obama
- Mauro Zijlstra, footballer
- Michelle Branch, singer, songwriter (Irish-Indonesian-Dutch)
- Meriam Bellina, singer, actress and model
- Mieke Wijaya, actress, singer
- Miliano Jonathans, footballer
- Mimi Mariani, actress, model, and singer (Belgian-Dutch-Manado)
- Mira Lesmana, film director
- Mitchell Baker, footballer

== N ==
- Nadine Ames, actress and model (Welsh father, Javanese mother)
- Nadine Chandrawinata, model (Chinese-Javanese father, German mother)
- Nadya Hutagalung, model, former video jockey
- Nafa Urbach, singer, actress, model
- Napoleon Bonaparte, Indonesian police officer (Malay, Minahasan, and Dutch descent)
- Nia Zulkarnaen, actress, former singer (Australian and Dutch descent)
- Nicholas Saputra, actor, model, video jockey

== O ==
- Ole Romeny, footballer

== P ==
- Pah Wongso, social worker (Dutch father)
- Petrus Josephus Zoetmulder, Indonesian Jesuit
- Pevita Pearce, actress, singer (Welsh father, Banjarmasin mother)
- Pierre Coffin, French animator, film director, and voice actor (French father, Indonesian mother)
- Pierre Tendean, Indonesian National Hero (Minahasan father, Dutch-French mother)
- Pierre Roland, actor (French father, Indonesian mother)
- Poncke Princen, Indonesia politician

== R ==
- Radja Nainggolan, football player (Belgian-Batak)
- Raphael Maitimo, Indonesian footballer
- Rianti Cartwright, actress, model, presenter and VJ (British-Italy, Welsh father and Sundanese-Javanese mother)
- Roy Marten, actor (Indonesian father, Dutch mother)
- Rafael Struick, footballer (Dutch father, Javanese-Surinamese mother)

== S ==
- Sandy Walsh, footballer
- Shae, singer, actress (Indonesian-Riau mother, Australian father)
- Shayne Pattynama, footballer (Dutch mother, Moluccan father)
- Sophia Latjuba, actress
- Suzzanna, actress
- Sergio van Dijk, footballer
- Stefano Lilipaly, footballer
- Steven William, actor (Indonesian mother, American father)

== T ==
- Tamara Bleszynski, actress (Indonesian mother, Polish father)
- Thom Haye, footballer
- Tim Geypens, footballer
- Tonnie Cusell, footballer

== V ==
- Alex Van Halen, drummer, co-founder of Van Halen (Dutch father, Indonesian mother)
- Eddie Van Halen, guitarist, co-founder of Van Halen (Dutch father, Indonesian mother)

== Z ==
- Zack Lee, actor and model (Indonesian-Chinese father, English mother)
