= Anugerah =

Indonesian soap opera

- Genre: Drama
- Created by: SinemArt
- Directed by: Sanjeev Kumar
- Starring: Nabila Syakieb; Samuel Zylgwyn; Dhini Aminarti; Sheila Marcia; Giovanni Yosafat Tobing; Cut Memey; Anjasmara; Ketrin Agustine; Kevin Andrean; Dwi Yan; El Manik; Femmy Permatasari; Ashraf Sinclair; Tamara Bleszynski; Jeremy Thomas; Paramitha Rusady; Diah Permatasari; Rifky Balweel; Tessa Kaunang
- Opening theme: Kebesaran Mu by ST12
- Ending theme: Aku Tak Berdaya by Indah Dewi Pertiwi
- Country of origin: Indonesia
- Original language: Indonesian
- No. of episodes: 473

Production
- Producer: Leo Sutanto
- Production location: Jakarta
- Running time: 60-180 minutes
- Production company: SinemArt

Original release
- Network: RCTI; TV9; mio TV; Astro Aruna; RTB; TV3
- Release: March 28, 2011 – January 15, 2012

Anugerah (English: Blessing) is an Indonesian television soap opera with 473 episodes. It was produced by SinemArt and directed by Leo Sutanto.

== Synopsis ==
The show tells the story of Nabila, a beautiful girl who is the best student at her university and faces a bright future. Her life suddenly changes when her father, Arif, whom she loves, is diagnosed with kidney failure and must undergo surgery. Nabila is running out of ways to help her father and she asks her stepmother, Lisa, for assistance. Nabila incidentally meets Endang, a wealthy woman, who understands her and is kind enough to help, because she went through the same thing with her son Rino.

Nabila also meets Fandy, the son of Sugih, a wealthy businessman who loves his three children very much. Sugih has asked Fandy to stop painting, to take a job at his company, and to get married, like his half-brother, Bima. Bima, who has been married for a long time to Wulan, really wants a child. Moreover, Hera, Bima's mother, knows that Fandy must soon get married, so she introduces Nabila to him. Hera is afraid that Fandy will be the first to have a child, however, as this will prevent her from inheriting Sugih's wealth. She pressures Wulan to undergo various treatments, but Wulan seems unable to bear children. Erlin, Wulan's mother, suggests that she seek the services of a surrogate mother, to which Wulan eventually agrees, though neither one tells Bima about their plan.

Erlin finds Mawar, who is willing to take on the role for a steep fee but in the end, Nabila becomes surrogate mother for Wulan. In order to fool Bima, Wulan pretends to be pregnant, but he eventually finds out and is disappointed.

== Cast and characters ==
Character	Portrayed by
Nabila Darmawan	Nabila Syakieb
Fandy Hartono	Samuel Zylgwyn
Bima Hartono	Giovanni Tobing
Wulan Anggraini	Dhini Aminarti
Mawar	Sheila Marcia
Intan	Sheila Marcia
Vanno Suryo Atmodjo	Jonas Rivanno
Reza Suryo Atmodjo	Jonas Rivanno
Alexa	Eva Anindita
Herman	Anjasmara
Dewa	Anjasmara
Arya	Ashraf Sinclair
Shania	Ketrin Agustine
Rino	Kevin Andrean
Sugih Hartono	Dwi Yan
Hera	Annie Anwar
Kasih Pertiwi	Merry Mustaf
Arif Darmawan	El Manik
Lisa	Cut Memey
Erlin	Femmy Permatasari
Endah	Dina Lorenza
Tini	Tessa Kaunang
Runia	Paramitha Rusady
Nugie	Suheil Fahmi Bisyir
Ade	Malaki Gruno
Ikhlas	Malaki Gruno
Mayang	Aqeela Calista
Cinta	Aqeela Calista
Nessa	Nessa Sadin
Karin	Alice Norin
Ryan	Miller Khan
Sultan	Jeremy Thomas
Clara	Alexandra Gottardo
Calista	Irish Bella
Monik	Marcella Simon
Zouya	Tamara Bleszynski
Cakra	Rifky Balweel
Tiara	Diah Permatasari
Bakti	Teddy Syach
Rascal	Dude Harlino
Sammy	Samuel Rizal
Wina	Roweina Umboh
Hesti	Ana Pinem
Rizki	Juan Christian
Nurlita	Leily Sagita
Kevin	Jonathan Frizzy

== International broadcasts ==
Country	Network Station	Television Station
Brunei	RTB	RTB1
Indonesia	MNC	RCTI, MNC Drama, Deli TV (SINDOtv)
Malaysia	STMB, MNC	TV9, MNC Drama, MNC International
Singapore	MNC, mio TV,	MNC Drama, MNC International, Astro Aruna
