= Bastian Steel Bukan Cowok Biasa =

- Genre: Musical comedy drama
- Created by: Leo Sutanto
- Written by: Serena Luna
- Directed by: Umam AP
- Starring: Bastian Bintang Simbolon (as Bastian); Bryan Domani; Cut Syifa; Hanggini Purinda Retto; Randy Martin; Qaidi Rozan; Nunu Datau; Angela Tee
- Opening theme: Bastian Bintang Simbolon, "Ini Pilihanku"
- Ending theme: Bastian Bintang Simbolon, "Ini Pilihanku"
- Country of origin: Indonesia
- Original language: Indonesian
- No. of seasons: 1
- No. of episodes: 38

Production
- Producer: Leo Sutanto
- Editor: Heru Hendriyarto
- Running time: 60 minutes
- Production company: SinemArt

Original release
- Network: RCTI
- Release: September 15 – October 24, 2014

Related
- Siti Bling-Bling Mengejar Cinta Pertama; Aisyah Putri The Series: Jilbab In Love; Harry Potter

Bastian Steel Bukan Cowok Biasa is an Indonesian soap opera musical comedy drama produced by SinemArt that airs daily on RCTI. The story is a loose adaptation of the Harry Potter story.

== Cast ==
=== Main cast ===
- Anjab Habibi as Bastian
- Cut Syifa as Jelita
- Bryan Domani as Guntur

=== Supporting cast ===
- Hanggini as Flora
- Randy Martin as Rommy
- Qaidi Rozan as Dudung
- Beby Natalie as Tamara
- Emmanuel Sylla as Dion
- Idrus Madani as Abdullah
- Sultan Djorghi as Abad
- Qubil AJ as Yanto
- Vonny Cornelia as July
- Yadi Timo as Fuad
- Enno TB as Yuni
- Melissa Grace as Melissa
- Nunu Datau as Yasmin
- Sultan Sudradjat as Vito
- Angela Tee as Tiara

Music is provided by Bastian Bintang Simbolon.
