= Datau =

Datau is a surname. Notable people with the surname include:

- Nunu Datau (born 1971), Indonesian actress
- Yudi Datau, Indonesian cinematographer
