= Sijjin (disambiguation) =

Sijjin is an Islamic conception of hell.

Sijjin may also refer to:

- Sijjin (2023 film)
- Sijjin (film series)
