= Rio Reifan =

Indonesian Actor (born 1985)

- Born: 25 February 1985 (age 41); Jakarta
- Occupation: Actor
- Parent(s): Hasan Ali; Saraswati

Rio Reifan (born February 25, 1985) is an Indonesian actor. His career started when he was a model. His name started to be known by public when he play in soap opera Wulan. In that soap opera, he roled as Nugroho or Nunu. He also had roled as Dewa when he roled in soap opera Intan. On August 14, 2017, the Indonesian Police arrested him for misappropriation of narcotics.

== Biography ==
His career began as a photo of him transmitted by his friends to event election cover boy a teen magazines. This was due rio known anti camera, therefore his friends idly register himself into the event. But who knew he was able to reach the seed.

After the event Rio was also face revlon 2006 election, although not won event that the parties MD entertainment offered him to follow cast at home their production. Finally Rio has also agreed over demands of the elder siblings. Unfortunately, a chance are still not in the Rio because Rio was expressed failed in the cast.

A year passed Rio is trying to follow event election model again, this time he managed to become finalists top guest various 2006 .After that, Rio trying to enroll to one of production house to follow casting soap opera and turns have passed. Debut his first soap opera after pass cast is soap opera big is beautiful' replace actor Andrew White. In addition Rio had starred in film a wide screen called darpin the movie.

== Soap opera ==
- Wulan as Nugroho or Nunu
- Cahaya
- Benci Bilang Cinta
- Diva
- Maha Kasih
- Aisyah
- Mini
- Aqso dan Madina
- Intan as Dewa
- Kejora dan Bintang
- Tukang Bubur Naik Haji
- Tangan Tangan Mungil
