= Intan (TV series) =

- Genre: Romantic Drama
- Written by: Serena Luna
- Directed by: Doddy Djanas
- Starring: Naysilla Mirdad; Dude Harlino; Glenn Alinskie; Ingka Noverita; Meriam Bellina; Nani Widjaja; Ninok Wiryono; Umar Lubis; Anwar Fuady; Nunu Datau; Farah Debby; Vera Detty; Rama Michael
- Opening theme: Ruang Rindu by Letto
- Ending theme: Ruang Rindu by Letto
- Composer: Kafka Nafisa
- Country of origin: Indonesia
- Original language: Indonesian
- No. of episodes: 263

Production
- Producer: Leo Sutanto
- Production location: Jakarta
- Running time: 60 minutes (18:00–19:00)
- Production company: SinemArt

Original release
- Network: RCTI
- Release: 6 November 2006 – 22 July 2007

Related
- Taqwa; Soleha

Intan is a 2006–2007 Indonesian soap opera starring Naysilla Mirdad, Dude Harlino, Glenn Alinskie, Ingka Noverita, Meriam Bellina, Nani Widjaja, Ninok Wiryono, Umar Lubis, Anwar Fuady, Nunu Datau, Farah Debby, Vera Detty, and Rama Michael. Written by Serena Luna and directed by Doddy Djanas. Produced by SinemArt Production. It aired on RCTI from 6 November 2006 to 22 July 2007 on Mondays to Sundays at 18:00–19:00 WIB, 19:00–20:00 WITA, and 20:00–21:00 WIT for 263 episodes.

== Synopsis ==
Kasih is a girl from a rich family who falls in love with Fajar, a boy from poor family. However, neither family approves of their relationship. One day, Kasih finds out she is pregnant and Fajar is the father. Fajar and Kasih marry. Kasih gives birth to a baby named Intan. They live in penury. Fajar decides to stop his studies and work to meet the needs of his family. However, Faiar dies in an accident. Kasih's parents remarry her with Dr. Frans. Kasih does not bring Intan with her to the new marriage, and leaves him with Lastri, Fajar's Mother. Lastri is angry about Kasih's marriage and departure and considers that Kasih has betrayed Fajar by leaving her baby.

Intan (Naysila Mirdad) grows up innocent and sweet, and loves Lastri (Hj. Nani Wijaya) a great deal. Lastri is very protective over Intan because she does not want her future damaged by her father, Fajar. Despite her efforts Lastri Intan gets pregnant. Lastri then asks Ello(Glenn Alinskie), Intan's close friend, to take responsibility. Ello hesitates, as he is at college, but in the end he decides to marry Intan, although his family is against the union. After they marry, Intan moves to Ello's House. Intan innocently starts a new life with Mr. Arman (Anwar Fuady) Mrs. Nadine (Meriam Bellina) and both of Ello's older brothers; Jemmy (Manfreed) and Rommy (Rama Michael). Happiness does not last long for Intan as, a few days after her marriage, Ello has an accident and dies. Nadine and Arman blame Intan for Ello's Death and evict her from the house. Intan begs Arman to let her stay, at least their son is born. Intan gives birth to a son, Rangga (Ryan Maladi). Nadine helps Intan to get to hospital.

Intan's early life in this house is not easy, because Nadine persecutes her. But Intan stands up to her with patience and love, treating Nadine as a mother and eventually Nadine's heart thaws. Intan is uncomfortable about staying on in her mother-in-law's house and, in order to look after her son, starts a sales job. At work, Intan meets Rado (Dude Harlino). and then moves to work at a salon. The salon is owned by Rado's Mother, Wina (Nunu Datau)and there she meets the assistant of the salon owner, Lila (Ingka Noverita). Lila also likes Rado, and tries to separate Intan and Rado. Meanwhile, Kasih is fighting kidney disease and needs a kidney transplantation, but does not find a donor match.

Dr. Frans does not want to lose Kasih, and finally finds Intan so she can donate her kidney to Kasih. Lastri is angry when she learns about this and Intan discovers that Kasih is her mother who she believed was dead. Despite the shock, Intan is still willing to donate her kidney. But her wish to do so is rejected by Rado, Lastri, and Kasih.

== Controversy ==
Soap opera Intan has been accused of plagiarising the Korean drama "Be Strong Geum Soon". Despite this accusation of plagiarism, SinemArt included the original title of its Korean drama in the title credits.

== Cast ==
- Naysila Mirdad as Intan
- Dude Harlino as Rado / Aditya
- Glenn Alinskie as Ello
- Ingka Noverita as Lila
- Meriam Bellina as Nadine
- Anwar Fuady as Armaan
- Hira Ninok Wiryono as Kasih
- Umar Lubis as dr. Frans
- Rico Tampatty as Fajar
- Nani Widjaja as Lastri
- Nunu Datau as Wina
- Mathias Muchus as Ardi
- Rama Michael as Romi
- Indah Indriana as Rena
- Sandy Tumiwa as Gery
- Zora Vidyanata as Sinta
- Manfreed as Jemmy
- Vera Detty as Nia
- Salma Paramitha as Bintang
- Alyssa Taradipa as Tiara
- Kevin Julio as Kevin
- Ricardo Silienzie as Bobby
- Rayn Wijaya as Ardi
- Kenny Austin as Fandi
- Lorenzo Abraham as Jodi
- Riyanto RA as Surya
- Virgo Brody as Mico
- Farah Debby as Nita
- Anneke Jodi as Rosa
- Rio Reifan as Dewa
- Ryan Maladi as Rangga
- Kiwil as Rizki
- Damara Adelardo as Yogi
