= Dewa (TV series) =

- Genre: Teenager
- Directed by: Desiana Larasati
- Starring: Naysila Mirdad; Dude Harlino; Baim Wong; Aura Kasih; Arifin Putra; Alice Norin; Fero Walandouw; Raya Kohandi; Citra Kirana; Umar Lubis
- Theme music composer: Noe
- Opening theme: Cinta Bersabarlah, Letto
- Ending theme: Cinta Bersabarlah, Letto; Music Setup; Kafka Nafisa
- Countries of origin: Indonesia; Singapore (mio TV Astro Aruna); Malaysia (Astro Pelangi 142)
- Original language: Indonesian
- No. of seasons: 1
- No. of episodes: 175

Production
- Executive producer: Elly Yanti Noor
- Producer: Leo Sutanto
- Production location: Jakarta
- Running time: 1 hour
- Production company: SinemArt

Original release
- Network: RCTI; Astro Aruna(start 5 September 2012); Astro (Astro Pelangi 142) 85 Episode (as 30 April 2012) Monday to Friday
- Release: October 3, 2011 – February 10, 2012

Dewa is an Indonesian soap opera television series which aired on RCTI from October 3, 2011, to February 10, 2012. The series was written by Serena Luna and directed by Desiana Larasati, stars Naysila Mirdad, Dude Harlino, Baim Wong and others.

== Cast ==
- Naysila Mirdad as Dewa
- Dude Harlino as Sakti
- Baim Wong as Ryan Andika Pratama
- Aura Kasih as Yola
- Alice Norin as Dita
- Arifin Putra as Yudha
- Fero Walandouw as Ariel
- Raya Kohandi as Anya
- Indra Bruggman as Indra
- Mey Chan as Nina
- Citra Kirana as Rana
- Cindy Fatika Sari as Gita
- Tengku Firmansyah as Ruslaan
- Cut Keke as Wiwik
- Umar Lubis / Riza Shahab as Bonar
- Mona Ratuliu as Dini
- Ponco Buwono as Edi
- Moudy Wilhelmina as Maudy
- Minati Atmanegara as Rindu
- Al Fathir Muchtar as Fathir
- Wiwid Gunawan as Lasmi
- Ferry Irawan as Vino
- Lily SP as Nia
- Nicole Parham Adelaide as Nicole
- Krisna Mukti as Krisna
- August Melasz as Producer
- Ana Pinem as Madam Inem
- Jefan Nathanio as Dewa
- Anriza as Rahman
- Amanda Putri Julianti as Kania
- Masayu Anastasia as Ira
