= Diah Permatasari =

Diah Permatasari may refer to:

- Diah Permatasari (actress) (born 1971), Indonesian actress and model
- Diah Permatasari (fencer) (born 1990), Indonesian fencer
