= Separuh Aku (TV series) =

- Genre: Romance full of twists
- Created by: Leo Sutanto
- Written by: Hilman Hariwijaya
- Directed by: Agusti Tanjung
- Starring: Asmirandah; Rezky Aditya; Miller Khan; Michella Putri; Kevin Andrean
- Theme music composer: David and Ihsan Nurrachman
- Opening theme: "Separuh Aku", Noah
- Ending theme: "Separuh Aku", Noah
- Country of origin: Indonesia
- Original language: Indonesian
- No. of episodes: 59

Production
- Executive producer: Elly Yanti Noor
- Producer: Leo Sutanto
- Production location: Jakarta
- Running time: 1 hour (21:15-22:45)

Original release
- Network: RCTI
- Release: October 15 – December 27, 2012

Separuh Aku (English: Half Me) was an Indonesian drama soap opera created by SinemArt and produced by Leo Sutanto. It was aired on RCTI, to October 15, 2012, to December 27, 2012, at 9:15 pm (21:15 PM). It is also composed music by Ichsan Nurrachman and Noah' keyboardist David Kurnia Albert.

The soap opera has been nominated for the Favorite Drama Series Program at the 16th Annual Panasonic Gobel Awards.

== Main cast ==
- Asmirandah as Adara
- Rezky Aditya as Rama
- Miller Khan as Dennis
- Michella Putri as Maya
- Kevin Andrean as Reza
- Putri Anne as Naning
- Tia Ivanka as Tia
- Ari Wibowo as Sandy
- Adipura Prabahaswara as Sudiro
- Vira Yuniar as Marni
- Johan Jehan as Edi
- Triningtyas as Ida
- Suheil Fahmi Bisyir as Andi
- Malaki Gruno as Adit
- Shelsi Valencia as Andien
- Debby Sahertian as Mpok Siti
- Al Fathir Muchtar as Indra
- Fera Feriska as Shinta
- Sisy Syahwardi as Sissy
- Jonas Rivanno as Jonas

== Controversy ==
Separuh Aku has been a controversy when it was stopped aired by RCTI since December 11, 2012. Screenwriter Hilman Hariwijaya admitted that hasn't notification from the production house and SinemArt. In addition of according of Programming & Production Director Ella Kartika, the soap opera has stopped due to have a secret story revealed.
