= Rico Tampatty =

Indonesian actor

- Born: 11 April 1964 (age 62); Biak, Papua, Indonesia
- Occupation: Actor
- Spouse: Laila Ibrahim
- Children: Rezky Pradansya Putra Tampatty; Adam Reynandya Putra Tampatty; Nadya Azzahra Tampatty; Amelya Azzahra Tampatty

Rico Tampatty (born April 11, 1964) is an Indonesian actor. He is known for his numerous roles in soap operas. His name started to be known by public when he played in soap opera Intan, in which he roled as Fajar, father of Intan who is roled by Naysila Mirdad.

== Career ==
He performed in many soap operas at private TV stations. Admitted as an idol of the youth in the 1980s, his career as a model and big screen actor was more and less influenced by his hobby as an automotive fan and his obsession to buy a car with his own money, which eventually bring him into the world that increased the popularity of his name, first in the movies and then on TV series.

After finishing his study at the United States, Rico did not leave his career as an actor. In 2006, he and other Indonesian actors such as Adjie Pangestu and Atalarik Shah were involved in the making of an action movie. They joined several Malaysian stars in a movie launched in December 2006 titled "Mission: 1511". Rico then started to perform in soap operas, where he met the actress that used to be his partner in 1980s, Meriam Bellina. Among of the soap operas that reunited them are "Intan" and "Mutiara" produced by Sinemart and RCTI, which were daily aired.

== Personal life ==
Rico married a Malaysian woman named Laila Ibrahim. He has four children, two sons and two daughters. He likes sweet food and is a fan of Formula One. He left Indonesia long enough from 1987 to 1999 for studying business management in Hawaii Pacific University, Honolulu, Hawaii, United States. With his new knowledge, Rico now has a job as a business consultant.

== Political activity ==
In the 2009 Indonesian election, he tried to enter politics by becoming a legislative candidate from the Patriot Party in the DKI III electoral area, which includes North Jakarta, West Jakarta, and Thousand Islands.

== Filmography ==
=== Films ===
- Wanita Sejati (FTV)
- Sorga Di Dunia Pintu Neraka 1983
- Tirai Malam Pengantin 1983
- Dia Yang Tercinta 1984
- Gawang Gawat 1984
- Pencuri cinta 1984
- Gejola Kawula Muda 1985
- Idola Remaja1985
- Madu dan Racun 1985
- Serpihan Mutiara Retak 1985
- Ketika Musim Tiba 1986
- Arini II 1988
- Sskia 1988
- Seputih Kasih Semerah Luka 1988
- Misi: 1511 2006

=== Soap operas ===
- Aku Ingin Pulang"
- Jangan Ada dusta"
- Shakila"
- Kasmaran"
- Cintaku Di Kampus Biru
- Intan as Fajar
- Maafkan Daku Bila Mencintaimu
- Mutiara
- Diva
- Hingga Akhir Waktu
- Rindu
- Dewi
- Kejora Dan Bintang
- Kemilau Cinta Kamila
- Karunia
- Tukang Bubur Naik Haji
- Cinta 7 Susun
- Aisyah Putri The Series: Jilbab In Love
- Berkah Cinta
- Anak Langit

== Discography ==
=== Rico Tampatty's First Album - Playboy - with Ira Wibowo ===
1. Menanti
2. Kembali
3. Ku Cinta Kau
4. Saskia Antara Cinta Dan Dusta
5. Waktu Menunggu
6. Saat Kusendiri
7. Demi Kamu Hanya Kamu
8. Wajah Dunia
9. Maafkan Dirimu

=== Other albums ===
- 1986 - Album pergelaran Swara Mahardhika Guruh Soekarnoputra "Gilang Indonesia Gemilang" sings a song "Langkah Kembara"
