= Permatasari =

Permatasari is an Indonesian surname. Notable people with the surname include:

- Devi Permatasari (born 1974), Indonesian actress, presenter, and model
- Devi Tika Permatasari (born 1987), Indonesian badminton player
- Diah Permatasari (actress) (born 1971), Indonesian actress and model
- Diah Permatasari (fencer) (born 1990), Indonesian fencer
- Vonny Cornellya Permatasari (born 1979), Indonesian actress
