= Aisyah Putri The Series: Jilbab In Love =

- Genre: Musical Comedy Drama
- Created by: Leo Sutanto
- Written by: Yanti Puspita sari
- Directed by: Desiana Larasati
- Starring: Anna Gilbert; Miller Ali; Aliff Alli; Henidar Amroe; Lucky Perdana; Bryan Domani; Salshabilla Adriani; Cassandra Lee; Steffi Zamora; Bella Graceva Amanda Putri; Rico Tampatty; Umar Lubis; Verrell Bramasta; Kevin Torsten; Syifa Hadju; Zahwa Aqilah; Meinorizah; Rosiana Dewi
- Opening theme: Fatin Shidqia, "Proud Of You Moeslem"
- Ending theme: Fatin Shidqia, "Proud Of You Moeslem"
- Country of origin: Indonesia
- Original language: Indonesian
- No. of seasons: 1
- No. of episodes: 104

Production
- Executive producer: Elly Yanti Noor
- Producer: Leo Sutanto
- Production locations: Jakarta, Indonesia
- Editor: Heru Hendriyarto
- Running time: 60 minutes (17:00-18:00pm WIB)
- Production company: SinemArt

Original release
- Network: RCTI
- Release: October 27, 2014 – February 15, 2015

Related
- Aisyah Putri The Series: Jilbab In Love 2

Aisyah Putri The Series: Jilbab In Love is an Indonesian soap opera musical comedy drama produced by SinemArt that airs daily on RCTI. The cast includes Anna Gilbert, Miller Khan, Aliff Alli, Henindar Amroe, and Lucky Perdana. The story is a loose adaptation of the book Asma Nadia.

== Synopsis ==
The show's central character is a high school student named Aisyah Putri (Anna Gilbert).

== Cast ==
- Anna Gilbert as Aisyah Putri, Puput (dual role)
- Miller Khan as Vincent
- Meyda Sefira as Arum
- Lucky Perdana as Hamka
- Aliff Alli as Iid
- Farish Nahdi as Harap
- Rosiana Dewi as Icha
- Syifa Hadju as Ana
- Jauhar as Izam
- Bella Graceva as Rasty
- Umar Lubis as Ridwan
- Rico Tampatty as Piet
- Henidar Amroe as aunt Aira
- Salshabilla Adriani as Bianca
- Steffi Zamora as Dara
- Cassandra Lee as Elisha
- Kevin Torsten as Ramos
- Meinorizah as Linda
- Faturahman as Pinoy
- Yoelitta Palar as Marini
- Rasyid Karim as Sugeng
- Bryan Domani as Bryan
- Verrell Bramasta as Verrell
- Zahwa Aqilah as Cindy
- Jansen Widjaya as Nugros
- Krisna Murti Wibowo as Anton
- Julian Jacob as Julian Jacob
- Eno TB as Bu Roro
- Johan Morgan as father Anna

== Music ==
The music is by Fatin Shidqia, from her album Single Realigi 2014 (Sony Music Indonesia). She also sings the opening and closing theme, "Proud Of You Moslem".

== Controversy ==
In the first episode aired on October 27, 2014, this soap opera showed a scene of teenage boys in school uniforms kissing Icha. The Komisi Penyiaran Indonesia (KPI, Indonesian Broadcasting Commission), decided that the program violated the Broadcasting Code of Conduct and Broadcasting Program Standard, and imposed administrative sanctions by a written warning.
