= The Adventure of Super7 =

Studio album by Super7
- Released: July 18, 2012 (original)
- Recorded: 2011–2012
- Genre: Pop, electropop, dance-pop
- Length: 30:19
- Label: Keci Music
- Producer: Rino Hadisa

Super7 chronology
The Adventure of Super7 (2012)	Bersama Meraih Mimpi (Super7 Album) (2013)

Singles from The Adventure of Super7
- 1. "BFF (Sahabat)"; 2. "Minggu Yang Ceria"; 3. "Go Green"

The Adventure of Super7 is the debut studio album by Indonesian boy-band Super7.

The album themed around the environment encourages Indonesian children to protect the environment and engage in positive actions. It won the award for Best Children Album in the 16th Annual Anugerah Musik Indonesia.

== Track listing ==
Standard edition
No.	Title	Writer(s)	Producer(s)	Length
1.	"BFF (Sahabat)"	The Joni Project	Rino Hardisa	3:24
2.	"Minggu Yang Ceria"	Kiki Bean	Rino Hardisa	2:34
3.	"Ayah dan Ibu"	Adrian Warouw	Rino Hardisa	3:36
4.	"Menabung"	Nugroho H.S	Rino Hardisa	2:59
5.	"Bersekolah"	Nugroho H.S	Rino Hardisa	3:48
6.	"Bersepeda (CFD)"	Paul T-Five	Rino Hardisa	3:34
7.	"Liburan"	Paul T-Five	Rino Hardisa	3:16
8.	"Go Green!"	Bimo "Bruntal" & Anda	Rino Hardisa	3:12
9.	"Ora Et Labora"	Adrian Warouw	Rino Hardisa	3:02
10.	"Anak Indonesia"	Ade Govinda	Rino Hardisa	2:54
Total length:				30:19

Indonesian Version
No.	Title	Writer(s)	Producer(s)	Length
1.	"BFF (Sahabat)"	The Joni Project	Rino Hardisa	3:24
2.	"Minggu Yang Ceria"	Kiki Bean	Rino Hardisa	2:34
3.	"Ayah dan Ibu"	Adrian Warouw	Rino Hardisa	3:36
4.	"Menabung"	Nugroho H.S	Rino Hardisa	2:59
5.	"Bersekolah"	Nugroho H.S	Rino Hardisa	3:48
6.	"Bersepeda (CFD)"	Paul T-Five	Rino Hardisa	3:34
7.	"Liburan"	Paul T-Five	Rino Hardisa	3:16
8.	"Go Green!"	Bimo "Bruntal" & Anda	Rino Hardisa	3:12
9.	"Ora Et Labora"	Adrian Warouw	Rino Hardisa	3:02
10.	"Anak Indonesia"	Ade Govinda	Rino Hardisa	2:54
Total length:				30:19

== Awards ==
Year	Award	Recipients and nominees	Category	Result	Host country
2013	Anugerah Musik Indonesia	The Adventure of Super7	Best Children's Album	Won	(Monaco); Indonesia

== Release history ==
Region	Release date	Format	Label
Indonesia	July 18, 2012	CD	Keci Music
