= Romeo & Juminten =

- Genre: Musical comedy drama
- Created by: Mega Kreasi Films
- Starring: Naysila Mirdad; Jeff Smith; Agesh Palmer; Jennifer Coppen; Mieke Amalia; Andi Soraya; Yadi Timo; Ponco Buwono; Zacky Zimah; Fauzan Nasrul; Tania Hardjosubroto; Stevani Nepa
- Theme music composer: Ungu
- Opening theme: Ungu, Tanpamu
- Ending theme: Ungu, Tanpamu
- Country of origin: Indonesia
- Original language: Indonesian
- No. of seasons: 1
- No. of episodes: 34

Production
- Production locations: Jakarta, Indonesia
- Running time: One hour (19:00–20:00pm Indonesia West Time)
- Production company: Mega Kreasi Films

Original release
- Network: SCTV
- Release: June 6 – July 23, 2016

Romeo & Juminten is an Indonesian soap opera produced by Mega Kreasi Films. The show first aired on SCTV on June 6, 2016.

== Plot summary ==
Atmo and Suryo promised each other that when their respective wives gave birth, they would betroth their children to each other. Suryo has a son and names him Romeo, while Atmo has a daughter and names her Juminten. Romeo and Juminten grow up together in the village of Ngawi, where they spend their youth as friends, until one day Suryo receives a scholarship to a school in London. Being a devoted friend, Atmo volunteers to sell his land to help pay for Suryo and his family to make the move to London. The decision to go to London weighs heavily on Suryo, and he wonders if Romeo and Juminten will be given the chance to marry.

== Cast ==
- Naysila Mirdad — Juminten
- Jeff Smith — Romeo Suryo Wicaksono
- Yadi Timo — Atmo
- Mieke Amalia — Retno
- Ponco Buwono — Suryo Wicaksono
- Andi Soraya — Menik
- Zacky Zimah — Sidik Japran
- Jennifer Coppen — Cheryl Suryo Wicaksono
- Fauzan Nasrul — Damar
- Fadel Levy — Reyhan
- Krisjiana Baharudin — Ditto
- Andryan Bima — Little Romeo
- Denino — Yoris
- Andrea Dea — Sela
- Tania Hardjosubroto — Jamilah
- Nima Ata — Cici
- Stefani Nepa — Zahra
- Agesh Palmer — Anabel

== Characters ==
Characters
Juminten
Romeo Suryo Wicaksono
Atmo
Retno
Suryo Wicaksono
Menik
Sidik Japran
Cheryl Suryo Wicaksono
Damar
Reyhan
Ditto
Little Romeo
Yoris
Sela
Jamilah
Cici
Zahra
Anabel
