= Bersama Meraih Mimpi =

- Genre: Musical Comedy Drama
- Created by: Manoj Punjabi
- Written by: Ai Munaf
- Directed by: Hilman
- Starring: Bryan Domani; Karel Susanteo; Raza Adhanzio; Jose Super7; Bagas Super7; Bryant Santoso; Ajil Ditto; Amanda Rawles; Rebecca Klopper; Khansa Athaya Edwina Kinasih
- Theme music composer: Keci Music
- Opening theme: Super7 (band), "Bersama Meraih Mimpi"
- Ending theme: Super7 (band), "Bersama Meraih Mimpi"
- Country of origin: Indonesia
- Original language: Indonesian
- No. of seasons: 1
- No. of episodes: 15

Production
- Production locations: Jakarta, Indonesia
- Editor: Heru
- Running time: One hour (18:00-19:00pm Indonesia West Time)
- Production company: MD Entertainment

Original release
- Network: MNCTV
- Release: November 18 – December 1, 2013

Bersama Meraih Mimpi ("Reaching Dreams Together") is an Indonesian soap opera, produced by MD Entertainment. It was first aired on MNCTV in November 2013. The main cast is led by members of the pop band Super7.

== Cast ==
- Bryan Domani as BD
- Ajil Ditto as Ajil
- Bryant Santoso as Bryant
- Raza Adhanzio as Raza
- Karel Susanteo as Karel
- Bagas Super7 as Bagas
- Jose Christian as Jose

== Supporting cast ==
- Rebecca Kloper
- Bella Anastasya
- Shania Syifa Bella
- Khansa Athaya Edwina Kinasih

== Synopsis ==
Students at a school with the band Super7, Sonya (Bella Anastasya), Mella (Rebeca), Kiki (Shifa Bella), and Adisty (Khanza), are inspired to form a girl group. They form the band D'Pinks, triggering fierce competition with Super7.

Competition between D'pinks and Super7 increasingly heats up when they become representatives of their school to compete in a singing championship event. Every effort is made by Super7 to deter D'Pinks, but their efforts fail. Through ingenuity and struggle, D'Pinks win the competition.

Competition between D'Pinks and Super7 also occurs in other activities at the school. Mella and Jose always compete in every science competition, and there is an internal problem among parents.
