= Sukma Ayu =

Indonesian actress and director

- Born: 10 November 1979; Jakarta, Indonesia
- Died: 25 September 2004 (aged 24); Bogor, West Java, Indonesia
- Occupations: Actress; model
- Years active: 1997–2004
- Parent(s): Nani Wijaya; Misbach Yusa Biran

Sukma Ayu (10 November 1979 – 25 September 2004) was an Indonesian actress who was most noted for playing Rohaye in the popular TV sitcom Kecil Kecil Jadi Manten. She was the daughter of writer and director Misbach Yusa Biran and actress Nani Widjaja.

== Career ==
Sukma Ayu was the fourth child of popular Indonesian writer and director Misbach Yusa Biran and actress Nani Widjaja. Her sister Cahya Kamila is also a film actress. After appearing as a model in advertisements for Emeron, Jas Juice etc., Sukma made her debut in television with the serial Wajah Perempuan. Subsequently she also appeared in other television soaps such as Terpesona, Jin & Jun and Doa dan Anugerah. However it was the 2002 sitcom Kecil-Kecil Jadi Manten that gave her wide recognition, critical acclaim and popularity among the audience. She played the lead role in the show, a tomboy named Rohaye. She shaved her head and undertook football coaching for her role. The show is widely considered as one of the best Indonesian teenage sitcoms.

== Death ==
On 9 April 2004, Sukma Ayu suffered a fall at Central Jakarta while enjoying the weekend with her colleagues and had to undergo a surgery for a cut she obtained due to the fall. However following the surgery, she developed a hematoma and slipped into coma. She remained in coma for 5 months, and died at her residence in Sentul, Babakan Madang, on 25 September 2004, due to a heart attack at the age of 24. She was buried at TPU Sukma Stone Tread, Ciomas, Bogor.

== Television ==
- Wajah Perempuan
- Terpesona
- Jin & Jun
- Doa dan Anugerah
- Tujuh Tanda Cinta
- Kecil-Kecil Jadi Manten
- Norak Tapi Beken
