= Amanah dalam Cinta =

- Created by: SinemArt
- Directed by: Indrayanto Kurniawan
- Starring: Julie Estelle; Christian Sugiono; Ali Syakieb; Alice Norin; Kevin Andrean; Nessa Sadin; Rudy Salam
- Opening theme: Jangan Menyerah by D'Masiv
- Ending theme: Jangan Menyerah by D'Masiv
- Country of origin: Indonesia
- Original language: Indonesian
- No. of episodes: 54

Production
- Production location: Jakarta
- Running time: 60 minutes
- Production company: SinemArt

Original release
- Network: RCTI
- Release: January 28 – March 22, 2010

Amanah dalam Cinta (Amanah in Love) is an Indonesian TV serial that was aired on RCTI. It was produced video productions house public distributor company network by SinemArt directed by Indrayanto Kurniawan.

== Cast ==
- Julie Estelle as Julie
- Christian Sugiono as Milo
- Ali Syakieb as Dhika
- Alice Norin as Alya
- Kevin Andrean as Wisnu
- Nessa Sadin as Diandra
- Rudy Salam as Prayogo
- Rowiena Sahertian as Diana
- Lily SP as Murni

== Synopsis ==
Julie is a brave, cheerful girl with a very attractive personality. Although sometimes she can be a bit mischievous, she is so lovable. With her adorable personality she easily gets out of punishments when she does something wrong. Julie lives with her uncle, Ahmad, and aunt, Murni's family. Ahmad is a very possessive and controlling person who decides for Julie all the important decision in Julie's life, such as where she should go to school and to whom she should marry.

Julie decides to move to Jakarta after being persuaded by Radit. He tells her that Jakarta is the place to study and pursue her dream to become a famous chef. He steals Julie's money when they are on a bus on their way to Jakarta. She does not know what to do. While in deep sadness, the bus she rides gets into an accident. A married couple in the bus, Arvino and Meetha, ask for Julie's help to introduce Vino, their son, to their big family in Jakarta. Julie accepts their request. Julie and Vino are the only survivors of the bus accident.
