= Super7 =

Indonesian boy band

- Origin: Jakarta, Indonesia
- Genres: Pop; dance-pop; electropop; electronica; teen pop
- Years active: 2011–2015
- Labels: Keci Music (2011–2014); Life Records (2015)
- Spinoffs: New Super7
- Past members: James Awuy; Bryant Santoso; Bryan Elmi Domani; Raza Adhanzio; Karel Susanteo; Reinhard Jonathan Daniel Poetiray; Alvin Lapian; Reynard Gaberial; Abdullah Tsaqib; Ajil Ditto; Bagas Dwi Rizqi Hidayat; Jose Christian

Super7, also known as S7, was a child boy band from Jakarta, Indonesia, formed in March 2011. Their most famous single, "BFF (Sahabat)", was released in 2011. They released two studio albums before breaking up in 2015. Some members of the band then formed the new ensemble New Super7; their fans were known as "Seveners".

== History ==
Super7 formed in 2011 and was signed to Keci Music in August 2011. The band members, who were all child actors, met on set and formed a band, which they named Super7 because there were originally seven of them (Ajil, Bagas, Jose, Bryant, James, Raza, and Karel), each with a unique talent. James withdrew early in the band's career and was replaced by Bryan Domani. Super7 released their debut album The Adventure of Super7 in 2012, and it was sold primarily in KFC restaurants in Indonesia. The album won the Best Children's Album award at the 16th annual Anugerah Musik Indonesia award ceremony in 2013.

In 2013, the band were cast in Bersama Meraih Mimpi, a musical comedy drama television series. The eponymous soundtrack, Super7's second studio album, was released the same year. In December 2013, Super7 published a special fan book also titled Bersama Meraih Mimpi, documenting the band's journey through the Indonesian music industry.

The group's structure fluctuated around this time, with various temporary members coming and going. On 17 March 2014, Bryant Santoso officially left the band. Two months later, on 3 May 2014, Bryan Domani and Raza Adhanzio also left. Karel Susanteo followed suit on 12 October of the same year. In late 2014, the band's contract with Keci Music ended.

In early 2015, the three remaining members of the band (Jose, Ajil, and Bagas) were cast in the soap opera Bidadari Takut Jatuh Cinta. Around this time, Bagas and Jose were planning to release a new single as a duo, but Super7 officially broke up shortly after. The group later reformed as New Super7, with a fresh lineup consisting of Jose Christian, Bagas Dwi Rizqi Hidayat, and Andreas Utomo.

== Other ventures ==
Suka Suka Super Seven Dan Idola Cilik Dalam Habis Gelap Menuju Terang is a feature film starring Super7, Tissa Biani, Mike Lewis, and Denada. The film was created by Geri Busye and released on 7 August 2014.

== Band members ==
- James Paul Arthur Awuy – sub vocal and sub dancer (2011)
- Bryant Santoso – sub-vocal and sub-dancer (2011–2014)
- Bryan Elmi Domani (known as BD) – main vocal and sub-dancer (2011–2014)
- Raza Adhanzio – sub-vocal and sub-dancer (2011–2014)
- Karel Susanteo – sub-vocal and sub-dancer (2011–2014)
- Abdullah Tsaqib – sub-vocal, sub-dancer (2014)
- Alvin Lapian – sub-vocal and sub-dancer (2014–2015)
- Reinhard Jonathan Daniel Poetiray – sub-vocal and sub-dancer (2014–2015)
- Reynard Gaberial – sub-vocal and sub-dancer (2014–2015)
- Muhammad Fazzil Alditto – sub-vocal and sub-dancer (2011–2015)
- Bagas Dwi Rizqi Hidayat – main rapper, sub-vocal and sub-dancer (2011–2015)
- Jose Christian – main vocal and sub-dancer (2011–2015)

== Discography ==
=== Studio albums ===
- The Adventure of Super7 (2012)
- Bersama Meraih Mimpi (2013)

=== Singles ===
Year	Title	Albums	Label
2011	"BFF (Sahabat)"	The Adventure of Super7	Keci Music
2011	"Minggu Yang Ceria"	The Adventure of Super7	Keci Music
2012	"Ayah dan Ibu"	The Adventure of Super7	Keci Music
2012	"Menabung"	The Adventure of Super7	Keci Music
2012	"Bersekolah"	The Adventure of Super7	Keci Music
2012	"Bersepeda (CFD)"	The Adventure of Super7	Keci Music
2012	"Liburan"	The Adventure of Super7	Keci Music
2012	"Go Green!"	The Adventure of Super7	Keci Music
2012	"Ora Et Labora"	The Adventure of Super7	Keci Music
2013	"Anak Indonesia"	The Adventure of Super7	Keci Music
2013	"Bersama Meraih Mimpi"	Bersama Meraih Mimpi	Keci Music
2013	"Watch Out"	Bersama Meraih Mimpi OST	Keci Music
2013	"BFF-Teman Terindah" (feat. Indah Dewi Pertiwi)	Bersama Meraih Mimpi	Keci Music
2013	"Sang Juara"	Bersama Meraih Mimpi OST	Keci Music
2013	"Hidup Adalah Ibadah" (feat. Swittins & Lollipop)	non-album single	Keci Music

=== Compilation appearances ===
- KFC Adu Bintang (2013)
- Keci Christmas Song (2013)
- Anak Indonesia (2014)

=== Music videos ===
- "Best Friend Forever" (2011) with 7icons
- "Go Green!" (2012)
- "Bersama Meraih Mimpi" (2013)

== Books ==
- Bersama Meraih Mimpi (2013)

== Television appearances ==
Years	Title	Role	Episode	Type	Television channel
2012	Best Friends Forever	Lead actors	1	Television film	SCTV
2013	Jessy & Super7	Lead actors	20	Musical drama	Indosiar
2013	Bersama Meraih Mimpi	Lead actors	14	Teen drama	MNCTV
2015	Bidadari Takut Jatuh Cinta	Lead actors	3	Teen drama	SCTV

== See also ==
- List of Indonesian pop musicians
- Indo pop
