= Wulan (TV series) =

Indonesian soap opera

- Genre: Romantic Drama
- Created by: Leo Sutanto
- Written by: Kitta Utara
- Directed by: Noto Bagaskoro
- Starring: Dhini Aminarti; Giovanni L.Tobing; Alice Norin; Asmirandah; Rio Reifan; Chacha Frederica; Shireen Sungkar; Uci Bing Slamet; Nani Somanegara; Rima Melati; Yadi Timo; Hengky Solaiman; Ana C. Pinem
- Opening theme: Sandaran Hati by Letto
- Ending theme: Sandaran Hati by Letto
- Composer: Purwacaraka
- Country of origin: Indonesia
- Original language: Indonesian
- No. of episodes: 146

Production
- Producer: Leo Sutanto
- Production location: Jakarta
- Running time: 60 minutes (21:00–22:00)
- Production company: SinemArt

Original release
- Network: RCTI
- Release: October 30, 2006 – May 18, 2007

Wulan is a 2006–2007 Indonesian soap opera starring Dhini Aminarti, Giovanni L. Tobing, Alice Norin, Asmirandah, Rio Reifan, Chacha Frederica, Shireen Sungkar, Uci Bing Slamet, Hengky Solaiman, Rima Melati, Nanny Somanegara, Yadi Timo and Ana C. Pinem. It was written by Kitta Utara, directed by Noto Bagaskoro, and produced by SinemArt Production. The show aired for 146 episodes between 2006 and 2007.

== Cast ==
- Dhini Aminarti as Wulan
- Giovanni Yosafat Tobing as Budi
- Alice Norin as Aline
- Asmirandah as Baby
- Rio Reifan as Nugroho
- Chacha Frederica as Dona
- Shireen Sungkar as Shinta
- Aditya Herpavi as Awan
- Lia Kartika as Ana
- Kinaryosih as Grace
- Uci Bing Slamet as Asih
- Nani Somanegara as Tati
- Rima Melati as Dira
- Yadi Timo as Mr. Jayadi
- Henky Solaiman as Mr. Wahyu
- Ana Pinem as Mrs. Jayadi
- Umay Shahab as Pandu
- Bulan Ayu as Arini
- Hanny Wahab as Maya
- Handika Pratama as Bagus
- Sandy Tumiwa as Danar

== Broadcast history ==
The show aired on RCTI from October 30, 2006 to May 18, 2007 on Mondays to Fridays at 21:00-22:00 WIB, 22:00-23:00 WITA, and 23:00-00:00 WIT for 146 episodes.

== Controversy ==
Wulan has been accused of plagiarising Korean drama Yellow Handkerchief.
