= Alice Norin =

Indonesian actress

- Born: June 21, 1987 (age 39); Stavanger, Norway
- Occupations: Celebrity; Model
- Spouses: Audy Riri Mestika Rachman (m. 2007; div. 2009) Alvin Yudhapatria (m. 2011)
- Children: Marriage with Alvin Yudhapatria: Alita Naora Lawi; Alana Naira Lawi
- Parent(s): Alfred Almendingen (father); Sofie Almendingen (mother)

Alice Norin (born 21 June 1987) is a Norwegian-born Indonesian model, and actress.

== Biography ==
Alice Norin started her career in the modeling world when she was 13 years old. Apart from modeling, she is also exploring the world of roles by starring in several soap operas. The soap opera that has starred Alice Norin, namely, Wulan. Not only the small screen, the eldest of 3 brothers also penetrates the big screen. Alice Norin premiered horror genre film with the title Psychopath (2005). In this first film, Alice Norin got the main role as Mita. In this film, Alice Norin plays with Sigit Hardadi and Ferry Ixel, directed by Rudi Aryanto, and produced by Andi Ekim. She has a brother named Alfred almendingen

After exploring the world of models and soap operas, Alice Norin tries to become a director. Alice Norin is working on a video clip entitled Rusty Guitar which is on her husband DJ Riri album Out Malam Repackage. For a long time, she had dreamed of becoming a director.

== Personal life ==
Alice Norin married DJ Riri on January 19, 2007. Even though at that time she was not even 20 years old. The marriage ceremony for this celebrity couple was held at Alice's house in Bilangan Cipete on Friday, January 19, 2007, morning with a set of prayer tools as a dowry. Meanwhile, the reception with a blend of two cultures, Norwegian and Sundanese, was held at Pondok Indah Mosque. Recently (April 2009), Alice Norin admitted to having an affair with a man named Agus Laksmono Sudwikatmono.

== Filmography ==
=== Film ===
| Year | Title | Role | Notes | Ref. |
|---|---|---|---|---|
| 2005 | Psikopat | Mita | | |
| 2008 | Ada Kamu, Aku Ada | DJ in beach | | |
| 2009 | Ketika Cinta Bertasbih | Eliana Pramesti Alam | | |
| 2009 | Ketika Cinta Bertasbih 2 | Eliana Pramesti Alam | | |
| 2018 | Hanum & Rangga: Faith & the City | Vera | | |
| 2019 | Kutuk | Elena | | |

=== Television ===
| Year | Title | Role | Notes |
|---|---|---|---|
| 2003 - 2005 | Dia | Susi | |
| 2003 - 2005 | Dia | Marsha | |
| 2005 - 2006 | Si Cantik dan Si Buruk Rupa (Eps. Ratapan Anak Tiri) | —N/a | |
| 2006 | Putri Kembar | —N/a | |
| 2006 | Bunga Kasih Sayang | Melati | |
| 2006 - 2007 | Wulan | Aline | |
| 2007 | Kasih | Sheila | |
| 2008 | Diva | Mona | |
| 2008 | Assalamualaikum Cinta | Alda | |
| 2010 | Amanah dalam Cinta | Alya | |
| 2010 | Ketika Cinta Bertasbih Spesial Ramadhan | Elliana | |
| 2011 - 2012 | Anugerah | Karin | |
| 2011 - 2012 | Dewa | Dita/Yola | |
| 2012 | Asmara | Nora | |
| 2012 - 2017 | Tukang Bubur Naik Haji the Series | Rere | |
| 2016 | 7 Manusia Harimau New Generation | Wiwit Lestari | |
| 2018 | Mahluk Manis dalam Bis | Dewi | |
| 2019 | Orang Ketiga | Novi | |
| 2019 | Supir dan Majikan | Lanny | |

Information

- N/A : Not Available

=== FTV ===
- TV Movie: Awas Kalau Lebaran Ini Gak Mudik (2013)
- TV Movie: Dimana Ibu Akan Tinggal (2014)
- TV Movie: Pembantu dan Majikan (2015)

== Awards and nominations ==
| Tahun | Penghargaan | Kategori | Karya yang dinominasikan | Hasil |
|---|---|---|---|---|
| 2010 | Festival Film Bandung | Praised Female Supporting Actor in Cinema Movies | Ketika Cinta Bertasbih | Won |
