= Nunu Datau =

- Born: Nuryanda Datau; 7 June 1971 (age 55); Jakarta, Indonesia
- Occupation: Actress
- Children: 2
- Parents: Yan Datau (father); Siti Nurhayati (mother)

Nuryanda Datau (born June 7, 1971), better known as Nunu Datau, is an Indonesian actress.

== Career ==
She roles at few of film and soap opera. One of which go back to making up a not appear named after several years is soap opera Intan. In that soap opera, she roles as Wina, Rado's Mother who is roled by Dude Harlino.

== Filmography ==
=== Films ===
- Sejoli Cinta Bintang Remaja (1980)
- Jangan Ambil Nyawaku (1981)
- Tali Merah Perkawinan (1981)
- Damai Kami Sepanjang Hari (1985)
- Lupus II (1987)
- Rini Tomboy (1991)
- Sisi Dunia

=== Soap operas ===
- Keluarga Pak Is
- Buruan Sayang Gue
- Kau Masih Kekasihku
- Hidayah
- Putri Kembar
- Katakan Kau Mencintaiku
- Arung dan Si Kaya
- Intan
- Legenda
- Kasih
- Sekar
- Nikita
- Kemilau Cinta Kamila
- Kemilau Cinta Kamila 2: Berkah Ramadhan
- Kemilau Cinta Kamila 3: Makin Cinta
- Kemilau Cinta Kamila 4: Cinta Tiada Akhir
- Putri Simelekete
- Putri yang Ditukar
- Anissa dan Anissa
- Badil & Blangkon Ajaib
- Super ABG
- Cinta Yang Sama
- Otomatis Jatuh Cinta
- Kita Nikah Yuk
- Bastian Steel Bukan Cowok Biasa
- Perempuan Di Pinggir Jalan The Series
- Mawar dan Melati
