= Nani Widjaja =

Indonesian actress (1944–2023)

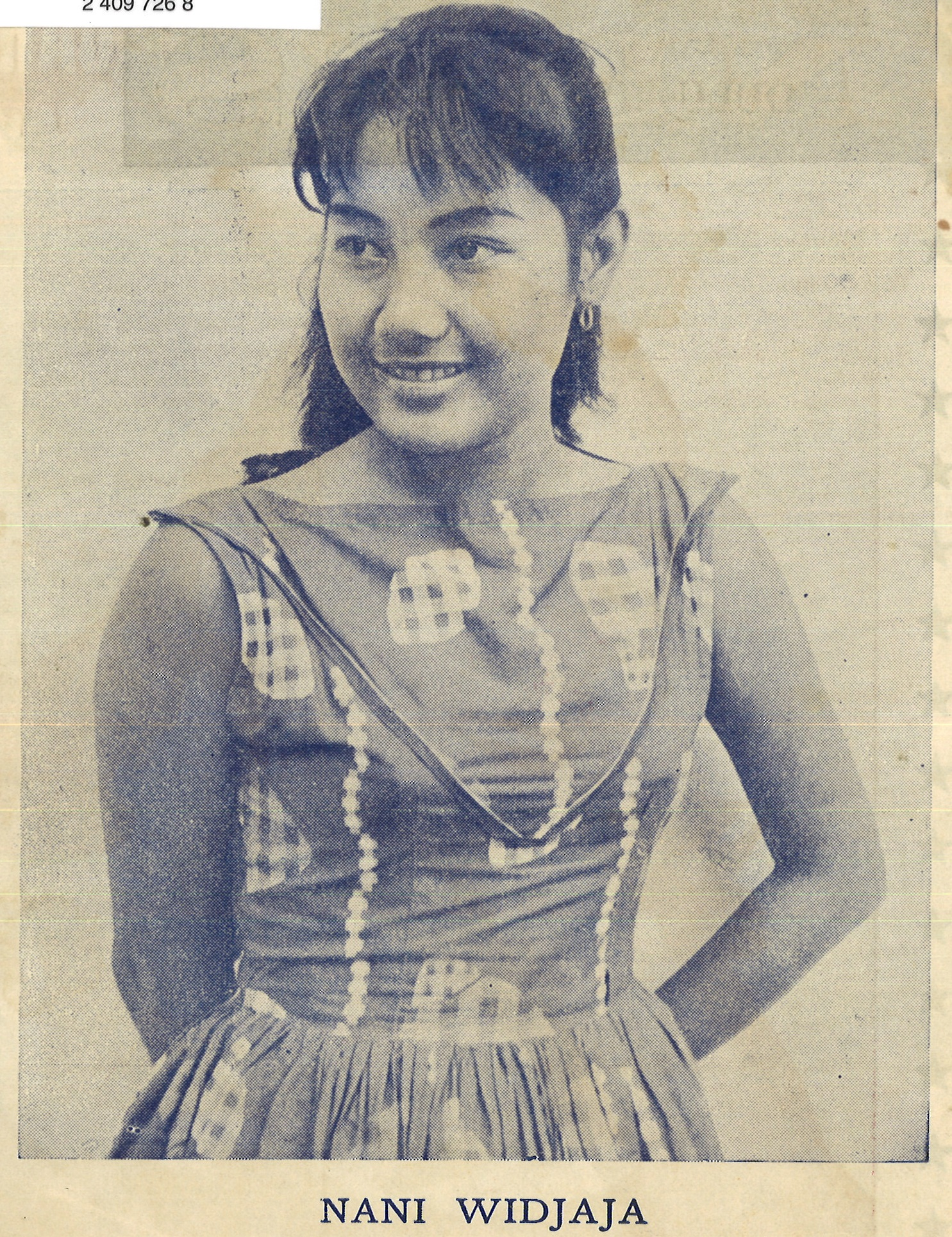
- Widjaja in 1961
- Born: 10 November 1944; Cirebon, West Java, Japanese-occupied Dutch East Indies
- Died: 16 March 2023 (aged 78); Jakarta, Indonesia
- Occupations: Actress; model
- Years active: 1960–2021
- Spouses: Misbach Yusa Biran (m. 1969; died 2012) Ajip Rosidi (m. 2017; died 2020)
- Awards: Citra Award for Best Supporting Actress (twice)

Nani Widjaja (Perfected Spelling: Nani Widjaya; 10 November 1944 – 16 March 2023) was an Indonesian actress and model who won two Citra Awards for Best Supporting Actress. She was best known for her role in television series Bajaj Bajuri. She was the part of Classical Indonesian Cinema.

== Early life ==
Nani Widjaja was born on 10 November 1944 in Cirebon, West Java, to Raden Ambari Widjaja. She took a university education in criminology from the University of Indonesia, and in 1973 she graduated from an acting workshop from Parfi and the Jakarta Art Institute.

== Career ==
During the late 1950s she became interested in acting. She made her film debut in a bit part in Lilik Sudjio's Darah Tinggi in 1960. During the 1960s she appeared mostly in supporting roles, though she did have some leading roles, such as in Rd Ariffien's Di Balik Dinding Sekolah (1961) and Misbach Yusa Biran's Menjusuri Djedjak Berdarah (1967).

During the 1970s and 1980s she was highly active, often taking multiple roles in a single year. All of her Citra Award-nominated work was completed during this time.

After the Indonesian film industry collapsed in 1993, Widjaja migrated to television. She acted in such soap operas as Gara-Gara (1993), Bung Besar (1993), Aku Mau Hidup (1994), Mat Beken (1995), Cinta Buat Monita (1995), Masih Ada Kapal ke Padang (1995), Penantian (1997), Gara-gara Plus (1997). Widjaja returned to feature films in 2007 with Rudi Soedjarwo's Cintapuccino. She has continued to appear in feature films, though at a much-reduced rate. She also remained active on television. According to the website for Taman Ismail Marzuki, Widjaja's best-known television role was as the Mother (Emak) in Bajaj Bajuri.

As of September 2013, Widjaja has acted in 111 films; in many of these she played a mother or grandmother. She has won two Citra Awards for Best Supporting Actress, one in 1978 for Yang Muda Yang Bercinta and one in 1983 for the biopic R. A. Kartini, out of five nominations. In the latter she portrayed Mas Ayu Ngasirah, the mother of Kartini.

== Personal life ==
=== Marriages, relationship, and children ===
Widjaja was married to fellow film activist and former director Misbach Yusa Biran, who was the brother of director Ida Farida. He died in 2012. Two of their five children also entered the film industry. One of them, Sukma Ayu, was best known for playing a tomboy named Rohaye in the sitcom Kecil Kecil Jadi Manten.

=== Illness and death ===
On 1 March 2023, Widjaja was rushed to Fatmawati Hospital, due to shortness of breath. She was moved to high care unit and started undergoing treatment, monitored by several intern doctors. Her daughter, Nina Kartika, stated that Widjaja was unable to speak for two months and her health began to deteriorate. She was diagnosed with dementia and then slipped into coma due to fever and shortness of breath. Widjaja's condition then began to improve and she underwent tracheostomy on 7 March 2023.

Widjaja died at Fatmawati Hospital in Cilandak, South Jakarta, on 16 March 2023, at the age of 78. Her death was announced by her daughter, actress Cahya Kamila. She was buried at Babakan Madang Cemetery in Bogor, West Java.

== Filmography ==
Source: (filmindonesia.or.id, Filmografi)

- Darah Tinggi (1960)
- Dibalik Dinding Sekolah (1961)
- Dilereng Gunung Kawi (1961)
- DKN 901 (1962)
- A Sing Sing So (1963)
- Dibalik Awan (1963)
- Kami Bangun Hari Esok (1963)
- Njanjian Dilereng Dieng (1964)
- Penjesalan (1964)
- Takkan Lari Gunung Dikedjar (1965)
- Dibalik Tjahaja Gemerlapan (1966)
- Tikungan Maut (1966)
- Menjusuri Djedjak Berdarah (1967)
- Nenny (1968)
- Operasi X (1968)
- Djampang Mentjari Naga Hitam (1968)
- Honey, Money and Djakarta Fair (1970)
- Cinta Pertama (1973)
- Dimadu (1973)
- Si Doel Anak Betawi (1973)
- Dewi (1974)
- Seruling Senja (1974)
- Karmila (1974)
- Wulan di Sarang Penculik (1975)
- Remaja 76 (1976)
- Kenangan Desember (1976)
- Garis-garis Hidup (1977)
- Senyum Nona Anna (1977)
- Secerah Senyum (1977)
- Sisa Feodal (1977)
- Gara-gara Janda Kaya (1977)
- Cinta Biru (1977)
- Jumpa di Persimpangan (1977)
- Dukun Beranak (1977)
- Yang Muda Yang Bercinta (1977)
- Jaringan Antar Benua (1978)
- Kasus (Kegagalan Cinta) (1978)
- Roda-Roda Gila (1978)
- Binalnya Anak Muda (1978)
- Pacar Seorang Perjaka (1978)
- Harmonikaku (1979)
- Puspa Indah Taman Hati (1979)
- Bukan Sandiwara (1980)
- Yang Kembali Bersemi (1980)
- Rayuan Gombal (1980)
- Darna Ajaib (1980)
- Sekuntum Duri (1980)
- Permainan Bulan Desember (1980)
- Tempatmu di Sisiku (1980)
- Kembang Padang Kelabu (1980)
- Nostalgia di SMA (1980)
- Gema Hati Bernyanyi (Setitik Embun) (1980)
- Melodi Cinta (1980)
- Roman Picisan (1980)
- Butir-Butir Cinta tak Bertepi (1981)
- Fajar yang Kelabu (1981)
- Remang-remang Jakarta (1981)
- Bila Hati Perempuan Menjerit (1981)
- Bunga Cinta Kasih (1981)
- Bercanda Dalam Duka (1981)
- Bawalah Aku Pergi (1981)
- R.A. Kartini (1982)
- Yang (1983)
- Dilihat Boleh Dipegang Jangan (1983)
- Ke Ujung Dunia (1983)
- Tirai Malam Pengantin (1983)
- Ranjau-Ranjau Cinta (1984)
- Kerikil-Kerikil Tajam (1984)
- Pencuri Cinta (1984)
- Untuk Sebuah Nama (1985)
- Arie Hanggara (1985)
- Serpihan Mutiara Retak (1985)
- Opera Jakarta (1985)
- Tak Ingin Sendiri (1985)
- Kesan Pertama (1985)
- Satu Mawar Tiga Duri (1986)
- Tak Seindah Kasih Mama (1986)
- Tahu Sama Tahu (1986)
- Di Dadaku Ada Cinta (1986)
- Selamat Tinggal Jeanette (1987)
- Catatan Si Boy (1987)
- Mekar Diguncang Prahara (1987)
- Luka di Atas Luka (1987)
- Setegar Gunung Batu (1988)
- Misteri dari Gunung Merapi (Penghuni Rumah Tua) (1989)
- Semua Sayang Kamu (1989)
- Catatan Si Boy III (1989)
- Sabar Dulu Dong...! (1989)
- Komar Si Glen Kemon Mudik (1990)
- Gampang-Gampang Susah (1990)
- Catatan Si Boy IV (1990)
- Ikut-Ikutan (1990)
- Ricky (Nakalnya Anak Muda) (1990)
- Ratapan Anak Tiri III (1990)
- Pengantin (1990)
- Dua Kekasih (1990)
- Taksi (1990)
- Saat Kukatakan Cinta (1991)
- Ketika Senyummu Hadir (1991)
- Perawan Metropolitan (1991)
- Nada dan Dakwah (1991)
- Pengantin Remaja (1991)
- Nuansa Gadis Suci (Kamar Tiga Perawan) (1992)
- Gara-gara (1993)
- Tahu Beres (1993)
- Cintapuccino (2007)
- Doa Yang Mengancam (2008)
- Paku Kuntilanak (2009)
- Perjaka Terakhir (2009)
- Maling Kutang (2009)
- Ummi Aminah (2012)
- Mama Cake (2012)

== Awards and nominations ==
Year	Award	Category	Recipients	Result
Indonesian Film Festival	1978	Citra Award for Best Supporting Actress	Yang Muda Yang Bercinta	Won
Indonesian Film Festival	1981	Citra Award for Best Supporting Actress	Bukan Sandiwara	Nominated
Indonesian Film Festival	1983	Citra Award for Best Supporting Actress	R.A Kartini	Won
Indonesian Film Festival	1984	Citra Award for Best Supporting Actress	Yang	Nominated
Indonesian Film Festival	1988	Citra Award for Best Supporting Actress	Selamat Tinggal Jeanette	Nominated
Maya Award	2012	Best Actress in a Leading Role	Ummi Aminah	Nominated

== Soap Opera ==
- Gara Gara
- Opera Sabun Colek
- Masih Ada Kapal Ke Padang
- Oh Mama Oh Papa
- Tetangga Oh Tetangga
- Mahkota Mayangkara
- Air Mata Ibu
- Cinta Dara kembar
- Menjemput Impian
- Ada ada-Saja (1993-1995)
- Balada Dangdut (Bulan Berkaca)
- Aku Ingin Pulang
- Doa Membawa Berkah
- Doa Membawa Berkah 2
- Wah Cantiknya (1999)
- Wah Cantiknya 2 (2000)
- Si Cecep (2000)
- Cintaku Di Rumah Susun (2001)
- Cintaku Di Rumah Susun 2 (2001)
- Cinta SMU (2002)
- Istri Untuk Suamiku (2003)
- Maha Kasih (2003)
- Pintu Hidayah (2004-2005)
- Bajaj Bajuri (2002-2007)
- Intan as Lastri
- Mawar
- Layar Komedi
- Cahaya Reni
- Kasih
- Mutiara (2007)
- Isabella as Hani (2009)
- Yusra Dan Yumna (2012)
- Tukang Bubur Naik Haji The Series (2012-2017) as Emak Haji
- Anak Sekolahan (2017)
- Orang Orang Kampung Duku (2017)
- Tuhan Beri Kami Cinta (2017)
- Orang Ketiga (2018)

== Works cited ==
- "Filmografi Nani Widjaja" [Filmography for Nani Widjaja]. filmindonesia.or.id (in Indonesian). Konfiden Foundation. Archived from the original on 27 April 2017.
- "Nani Widjaja". filmindonesia.or.id (in Indonesian). Konfiden Foundation.
- "Nani Widjaja" (in Indonesian). Taman Ismail Marzuki. Archived from the original on 5 January 2010.
- "Penghargaan Nani Widjaja" [Awards for Nani Widjaja]. filmindonesia.or.id (in Indonesian). Konfiden Foundation. Archived from the original on 27 August 2015.
- "R.A. Kartini". filmindonesia.or.id (in Indonesian). Konfiden Foundation. Archived from the original on 15 October 2013.
- Rostanti, Qommarria (11 April 2012). "Nani Widjaja Tabah Hadapi Kepergian Suami" [Nani Widjaja Strong Facing her Husband's Death]. Republika (in Indonesian).
- "Sitcom star Sukma Ayu dead at 25". The Jakarta Post. 26 September 2004. Archived from the original on 4 March 2016.
