= Umay Shahab =

Indonesian actor

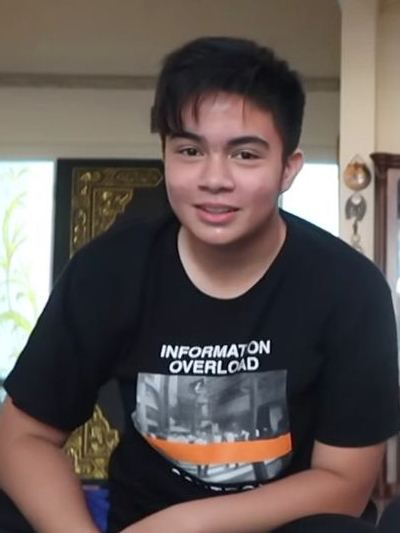
- Born: Muhammad Arfiza Shahab; February 16, 2001 (age 25); Jakarta, Indonesia
- Occupations: Celebrity; Singer; Presenter; Model
- Known for: Eneng and Magic Socks
- Awards: AMI Award for Best Children Album at the 14th Annual Anugerah Musik Indonesia; AMI Award for Best Children Male Solo Artist at the 14th Annual Anugerah Musik Indonesia; AMI Award for Best Children Male Solo Artist at the 15th Annual Anugerah Musik Indonesia

Muhammad Arfiza Shahab (born 16 February 2001), better known as Umay Shahab is an Indonesian actor, singer, presenter and model. Umay Shahab began to be known when he starred in the Wulan (soap opera) and acted as Pandu, Wulan's son. However, his name began to be widely known thanks to his role as Bobby in the soap opera Eneng dan Kaos Kaki Ajaib (Eneng and Magic Socks). In addition, as a singer, Umay Shahab released his first album sponsored by KFC titled Umay Shahab. The album achieved success with triple platinum awards from its CD sales of 250 thousand copies. Through this album, Shahab also won the AMI Award for Best Children Male Solo Artist and AMI Award for Best Children Album at 14th Annual Anugerah Musik Indonesia. In 2009, he began playing movie with the personnel of Indonesian rock and roll band, The Changcuters entitled The Tarix Jabrix 2.

== Biography ==
=== Early life ===
Umay Shahab was born in Haji Hospital Jakarta, Makasar, East Jakarta. He comes from Ba 'Alawi sada family of the Arab Hadhrami surnamed Aal Shihāb-Uddīn, his father was a private worker named Said Hanafi Shahab, while his mother is a Betawi woman named Yahni Dahmayanti. Shahab has a younger brother named Raffi Shahab.

Umay Shahab was born under the name of Muhammad Arfiza Shahab. At first he was called Umay, when he was still in the womb of his mother, at that time his mother often read a book that tells about the caliph of Islam, Umar bin Khattab. His mother then planned to give Umar's name to him, but since there were too many people named Umar, she then decided to change Umar's pronunciation to Umay. This innovation was finally approved by her husband, Said Hanafi Shahab. Although in the end, Umay Shahab name does not become its official name, but the name was then he used as a nickname and his famous name since childhood.

== Discography ==
=== Album ===
Title	Released	Label	Notes	Refs.
Umay	2010	Music Factory Indonesia	Sponsored by KFC; got the AMI Award for Best Children Album at the 14th Annual Anugerah Musik Indonesia	
Pesta Sekolah (School Party)	18 May 2011	Music Factory Indonesia	got the AMI Award for Best Children Male Solo Artist at the 15th Annual Anugerah Musik Indonesia	

=== Singles ===
Title	Released	Label	Notes	Refs.
Happy Family	5 July 2014	Manager Seru Entertainment	feat. Ebith Beat A	
Sudahlah (Never Mind)	5 February 2018	Harmoni Musik Indonesia		

== Filmography ==
=== Film ===
Title	Year	Role	Notes	Refs.
The Tarix Jabrix 2	2009	Donadoni		
Pengantin Cinta (The Bride of Love)	2010	Unknown		
Heart Beat	2015	Cameo		
One Day We'll Talk About Today	2020	Uya		
Stealing Raden Saleh	2022	Gofar		

=== Soap opera ===
Title	Year	Role	Notes	Refs.
Wulan	2006	Pandu	Son of Wulan	
Candy	2007			
Eneng dan Kaos Kaki Ajaib (Eneng and Magic Socks)	2007	Bobby		
Cahaya	2007	Rian		
Upik Abu dan Laura (Upik Abu and Laura)	2008	Ruslan		
Isabella	2009	Timur		
Si Mamat Anak Metropolitan (Mamat the Metropolitan Child)	2011	Mamat		
Cerita Anak Langitan (Story of the Heavenly Child)	2012	Umay		
Abay Anak Ajaib (Abay the Prodigy)	2012	Markum		
Si Cemong (The Tadpole)	2013	Iboy		
Bidadari Takut Jatuh Cinta (Angel Fear Falling in Love)	2014	Guntur		
High School Love Story	2015	Tresno		
Gerhana Bulan Merah (Red Lunar Eclipse)	2016	Fandy		
Roman Picisan The Series	2017	Samuel		
Catatan Harian Aisha (Aisha's Daily Records)	2018	Ridho		

=== Webseries ===
Title	Year	Role	Notes	Refs.
Is This Love?	2017	Bayu Saka		

== Commercials ==
- KFC
- Mie Sedaap
- Kia Motors
- Mountea
- Indomie
- Dancow
- Biolysin Kids
- Mentos
- Yupi candy
- Curcuma Plus
- Masako
- Marimas
- and others

== Works cited ==
=== Book ===
- KKPK Star: Umay Jagoan Cilik (2013), published by DAR! Mizan

=== Others ===
Title	Released	Role	Type	length of Time
Cinta Dibalik Awan (Love Behind the Cloud)	14 February 2016	Director	Short movie	16 minutes 20 seconds
Cinta Dibalik Awan 2 (Love Behind the Cloud 2)	15 May 2016	Director	Short movie	14 minutes 43 seconds
Cinta Dibalik Awan 3 (Love Behind the Cloud 3)	22 September 2016	Director	Short movie	26 minutes 30 seconds

== Awards and nominations ==
Year	Nominated work	Award	Category	Result
2011	Umay	14th Anugerah Musik Indonesia	AMI Award for Best Children Album	Won
2011	Umay Shahab – Jagoan Sejati (Real Hero)	14th Anugerah Musik Indonesia	AMI Award for Best Children Male Solo Artist	Won
2012	Umay Shahab – Pesta Sekolah (School Party)	15th Anugerah Musik Indonesia	AMI Award for Best Children Male Solo Artist	Won
2012	Pesta Sekolah (School Party)	15th Anugerah Musik Indonesia	AMI Award for Best Children Song	Nominated
2012	Umay Shahab	5th Nickelodeon Indonesia Kids' Choice Awards	Favorite Child Star	Nominated
2017	Umay Shahab – Roman Picisan The Series	Silet Awards 2017	Aktor Tersilet (The Most-Silet Actor)	Nominated
