= Andi Soraya =

Indonesian actress (born 1976)

- Born: Andi Soraya Assegaf; June 18, 1976 (age 49); Jakarta, Indonesia
- Occupation: Celebrity
- Years active: 1995 – present
- Spouse(s): Ahmad Kurnia Wibawa (1997–2001); Rudy Sutopo (2011–2015)
- Partner: Steve Emmanuel (2001–2007)
- Children: 3
- Parent(s): Andi Zen; Laila
- House: Assegaf

Syarifah Andi Soraya Assegaf (born 18 June 1976) is an Indonesian actress. She became known to the public after starring the RCTI soap opera Air Mata Terakhir.

== Career ==
Andi Soraya began her career by modelling in advertisements for clients such as Prenagen, B-29, Vegeta, Bank Mandiri, and Hit. She was cast in the Indonesian soap opera Air Mata Terakhir on the RCTI network. In 2008, she appeared in the film Anda Puas, Saya Loyo.

In 2008, she appeared in the suspense mystery Hantu Aborsi and the comedy Kutunggu Jandamu with Dewi Persik. She was in the films Hantu Puncak Datang Bulan and Arisan Brondong with Ferly Putra in 2010. She sang and produced the song Terpisahkan from the film Pengakuan Seorang Pelacur. She also had the lead role in the film.

== Personal life ==
Andi Soraya has Arab, Cirebon and Bugis blood, where her father was Andi Zen Assegaf was an Arab-descent and mother was Laela. Soraya has three siblings: Andi Mohammad Noor Assegaf (older brother), Andi Suzie (older sister) and Andi Jihan (younger sister).

She married Ahmad Kurnia Wibawa in 1997. They divorced in 2000. She was in a relationship with actor Steve Emmanuel, and they have one child. On 18 November 2011, she married again, with Rudi Sutopo, an oil businessman. They divorced in October 2015.

== Filmography ==
=== Film ===
| Year | Title | Role | Notes |
|---|---|---|---|
| 2008 | Anda Puas, Saya Loyo | Madame Tetty Qadi Pinky | Supporting role |
| 2008 | Hantu Aborsi | Teacher | Cameo |
| 2008 | Ku Tunggu Jandamu | Cherry | Lead role |
| 2009 | Susuk Pocong | Asti | Lead role |
| 2009 | Maling Kutang | Wife | Cameo |
| 2009 | Mau Dong Ah | Lia | Supporting role |
| 2010 | Dendam Pocong Mupeng | Sherly | Lead role |
| 2010 | Arisa Brondong | Misye | Supporting role |
| 2010 | Pengakuan Seorang Pelacur | Rachel | Lead role |
| 2011 | Mejeng Cinta | | |
| 2011 | Bawang Merah Bawang Putih | | Supporting role |

=== Television ===
| Year | Title | Role | Notes | Network |
|---|---|---|---|---|
| 1999–2003 | Gerhana | | Supporting role | RCTI |
| 2000 | Air Mata Terakhir | | Supporting role | RCTI |
| 2001 | Harga Diri 2 | | Supporting role | RCTI |
| 2001–2002 | Tiga Orang Perempuan | | Supporting role | SCTV |
| 2002 | Aku Dan Dia | | | |
| 2003 | Si Yoyo | | Supporting role | RCTI |
| 2004 | Si Yoyo 2 | | Supporting role | RCTI |
| 2005–2006 | Hidayah | | | Trans TV |
| 2006 | Sepatu Kaca | Raisa's mom | Supporting role | SCTV |
| 2008 | Cinta Kirana | | Supporting role | Indosiar |
| 2008–2009 | Kasih Dan Amara | | Supporting role | Indosiar |
| 2009–2010 | Hafizah | | Supporting role | SCTV |
| 2012 | Insya Allah Ada Jalan | | Episode: "Penjual Curang Berujung Petaka"; Episode: "Bidan Penjual Bayi" | SCTV |
| 2014 | Cakep-Cakep Sakti | Agni | Supporting role | MNCTV |
| 2016 | Romeo & Juminten | Menick | Supporting role | SCTV |

== TV advertisement ==
- Prenagen
- B-29
- Vegeta
- Bank Mandiri
- Hit
