= Cinta 7 Susun =

- Official Poster from SinemArt
- Genre: Musical Comedy Drama
- Created by: SinemArt
- Written by: Hilman Hariwijaya
- Directed by: Desiana Larasati; Dodi M. Surahman
- Starring: 7icons Mischa Chandrawinata; Baim Wong; Raya Kohandi; Devi Noviaty; Gege Elisa; Shandy Ishabella; Gunawan Sudradjat; Cut Memey; Rico Tampatty; Minati Atmanegara; Mario Maulana; Roy Marten; Giovanni Yosafat Tobing; Ben Kasyafani; Yoelitta Palar; Miller Ali
- Theme music composer: Laurensius Steven & Keci Music
- Opening theme: 7icons, "Cinta 7 Susun"
- Ending theme: 7icons, "Cinta 7 Susun"
- Country of origin: Indonesia
- Original language: Indonesian
- No. of episodes: 91

Production
- Executive producer: Elly Yanti Noor
- Producer: Leo Sutanto
- Production locations: Jakarta, Indonesia
- Editor: Heru Hendriyarto
- Running time: One hour (18:00-19:00pm Indonesia West Time)
- Production company: SinemArt

Original release
- Network: RCTI (Indonesia); TV9 (Malaysia)
- Release: January 28, 2013 – 10 May 2013

Related
- MNC drama

Cinta 7 Susun is an Indonesian soap opera musical comedy drama produced by SinemArt that aired daily on RCTI at 18:00pm (Indonesia West Time). This is an autobiography that tells of the journey formation personnel 7icons because of where they lived in the Flats which will soon be evicted, through their stories in the form of a fictitious (because it is not based on actual events). Cast is 7icons, Mischa Chandrawinata, Baim Wong, Raya Kohandi, Devi Noviaty, Gege Elisa, Shandy Ishabella, Gunawan Sudradjat, Cut Memey, Rico Tampatty, Minati Atmanegara, Mario Maulana as well as other supporting cast as well as some cameo actors who have often appeared on Indonesian movie or television series.

== Synopsis ==
Cinta 7 Susun tells the story of the girls in the Flats "RT 7" they are A.Tee, Pj, Linzy, Natly, Mezty and Grace with different nature, origin and background. They all live in the same place, in the Flats RT 7. Unfortunately, their way is not easy. They must deal with their biggest rivals, "The Barbies" which is Linzy favorites girl band, consists of a rich girl like Britney gang (Raya Kohandi), Milley (Devi Noviaty), Selena (Gege Elisha) and Demi (Shandy Ishabella). Competition for increasingly tapered A.Tee had trouble with Britney. Britney do not like the act of A.Tee and Flats RT 7, and after learning that Danish (Mischa Chandrawinata), the former coach "The Barbies" and former girlfriend who also defended and lived in the Flats RT 7, Britney urged both parents to evict Flats RT 7 adjacent to their Luxury Housing.

Then uniquely A.Tee met Joe (Baim Wong) whose brother of Britney that was being forced to be marry by his parents, Joe and A.Tee then make a fake girlfriend to play with the help of her best friend (A.Tee, Pj, Linzy, Natly, Mezty and Grace) who also assisted by Mezty's father, Hj.Makmun (Gunawan Sudradjat) and Natly's mother, Fatimeh (Cut Memey). On the other hand, Demi member of "The Barbies" are secretly love Danish. After the play unfolds, problems started coming threatening Flats RT 7. So A.Tee, Pj, Linzy, Natly, Mezty and Grace was united, quite difficult to unite them with a different character. Britney also take advantage of the situation to ask the Danish train "The Barbies" back. But for the love of the residents of Flats RT 7 in which they live, and the people in it who are like family, ultimately Danish, Joe, A.Tee, Pj, Linzy, Natly, Mezty and Grace struggled reduce personal ego and conflict between them. With Danish upbringing as a coach and Joe as their manager, then A.Tee, Pj, Linzy, Natly, Mezty and Grace finalize their musical skills and vocal girlband to win the Competition. They all finally united by their love of music, which formed "Rusun" girlband by accident in an attempt to save their homes from demolition.

But the problem was re-emerging in the Flats RT 7, when Pj father (Henky Solaiman) brings a man named Choky (Giovanni Jehoshaphat Tobing) who wants to propose to her, and PJ turned to love Danish. A.Tee also began to realize she loved Joe, while Joe was close to his best friend Mezty and also Selena "The Barbies" personnel who dare to approach Joe. There is also competition between Mezty's father, Hj.Makmun, and Rojali (who helped Joe and A.Tee pretense before) to treat Natly's mom, Fatimeh, as wives.

When Danish and "Rusun" girlband to make his debut, Danish needs 7 voices. Choky save girlband "flats" with his sister named Uty, but with a condition that he can be with Pj. Uty was ever oppressed by Britney, when she was fat. With a vision and a mission, finally girlband "flat" areas formed the band metamorphosed into a female vocal group with 7 different characters which they call "7icons".

How is the continuation of the story 7 girls in the Flats RT 7 struggle to save their homes? Will they success to fight their own egos and unite for their debut in music recording?

== Cast ==
=== Flats RT 7 Residents ===
Actor	Character	Description
A.Tee	A.Tee	Workers in the shop Hj.Makmun
Pj	Pj	Danish's Musical Friends
Natly	Natly	Flats rented house owner's daughter RT 7
Linzy	Linzy	Workers at Jimmy Salon; Fans of The Barbies
Mezty	Mezty	Children Hj.Makmun rent Flats in RT 7
Gc	Grace	Paranormal in the Flats RT 7
T-Sha	UTY	Choky sister called Butet been bullied by Britney when he was a fat
Mischa Chandrawinata	Danish	Musician in the Flats RT 7 RT Britney's ex-boyfriend who had become coach of "the Barbies"
Gunawan Sudradjat	Hj.Makmun	Careers stalls in the Flats RT 7 Mezty's Dad
Cut Memey	Fatimeh	Owners of rent Flats RT 7 Natly's Mom

=== Luxury Housing Residents ===
Actor	Character	Description
Baim Wong	Joe	Brother of Britney
Raya Kohandi	Britney	Member & leader of "The Barbies"; Sister of Joe's
Devi Noviaty	Milley	Member of "The Barbies"; Close friend of Britney and Selena
Gege Elisa	Selena	Member of "The Barbies"; Close friend of Milley
Shandy Ishabella	Demi	Member of "The Barbies"; Companions of the most trusted by Britney
Rico Tampatty	Syafei Syamsudin	Britney and Joe Dad; Wanted displacing Flats RT 7 and build a mall
Minati Atmanegara	Susan	Britney and Joe Mom; Always forcing Joe to get married

=== Supporting cast ===
Actor	Character	Description
Vani Lauw (Ex-Icons: Elegant Icon)	Vanila (episodes 1-3)	Twitter mania at Flats RT 7
Chris Ryan(Duo Arka)	(episodes 2-3)	Danish best friend
Mario Maulana	Jimmy (specifically supporting role)	Owner of salon in the Flats RT 7 Linzy places to work
Malih	Rojali (specifically supporting role)	Materialistic owner of luxury rented house
Roy Marten	Akhmal (specifically supporting role)	Britney and Joe Grandpa who likes to seduce young women
Henky Solaiman	Sangaji(specifically supporting role)	Pj's Dad; Match Pj with Choky
Giovanni Yosafat Tobing	Choky (specifically supporting role)	Help Mr. Pj of disaster Pj future husband Brother of Uty
Anwar Fuadi	Poltak (specifically supporting role)	Choky and Uty Dad; Pj Prospective father in law
Pierre Gruno	(episodes 23-24)	Record label Producer
Putri Titian	Daniela (specifically supporting role)	Twins & Sister of Danish; Coming to Jakarta to look for experience and money
August Melasz	Abdul Rahman (episodes 40-42)	Claiming as Abdurahman who left the father of A.Tee A.Tee on A.Tee grandparents
Debby Cynthia Dewi	Sulastri (specifically supporting role)	A.Tee's Mom; Experiencing mental stress because of the father abandoned A.Tee
Yoelitta Palar	Alya/Lala (specifically supporting role)	Linzy's Stepmom; Take care and also expend while Linzy's father in sickness and until death
Anissa Aziza	Siti (episodes 43-44)	Friend Daniela; Refer Daniela and also Linzy to invest
Ben Kasyafani	Jhoni/Joko (specifically supporting role)	The man who sent by Demi to set a trap before 7icons coming go to Britney birthday party
Miller	Al (episodes 54-56)	Claiming to be the Son of King Baharudin and Prince of the Semenanjung Kingdom; Fans of 7icons(ICONIA) from across the country
Yadi Timo	Suryo (specifically supporting role)	A Shaman/Astrologer
Bolot	Miun(specifically supporting role)	Linzy Grandpa; Coming from the village looking for Linzy at flats
Puadin Redi	Acong Firman (episodes 71-72)	A handsome and wealthy Chief of Garuda village
Jaja Mihardja	(Special supporting role)	A.Tee's Father & Grace's stepfather

== Theme ==
Various musician

- 7icons

Label: Keci Music

Album:
The Journey of Love
Track
1. Playboy (Created by: Dewiq/DJ Sumantri)
2. Penjaga Hati (Created by: Abdul [Coffe Theory] & Riza)
3. Nempel Di Hati{My Friends} (Ciptaan: Angel Icons)
4. Patah Hati (Ciptaan: Kiki [Bean])
5. Tahan Cinta (Created by: Raymond)
6. Sabar Sayang (Created by: Arlan)
7. Jealous (Created by: Adrian Warouw)

Single:
1. Bebi Romeo Mega Hits: Cinta Cuma Satu (Created by: Bebi Romeo & Re-arrangement: J-Flow)
2. Playboy{Bali Mix} (Created by: Dewiq/DJ Sumantri & Re-arrangement: Keci Music & 7icons)

Digital Single:
1. Cinta 7 Susun (Created by: Anda Wardhana & Deni Indrajaya)
2. PHP{Pemberi Harapan Palsu} (Created by: Anda Wardhana)
3. TTP{Tiba Tiba Posesif} (Created by: Anda Wardhana)

- Devi Noviaty
  Label: 18 Musik

Single:
1. Luar Biasa
2. In Love With You (Created by: Catur S)

- The Barbies
  By: SinemArt

Single:
1. Lossaah (Created by: Anda Wardhana)
2. Veni Vidi Vici (Created by: Anda Wardhana)

== Opening and closing ==
- 7icons
  Song title: "Cinta 7 Susun"
  Created by: Anda Wardhana & Deni Indrajaya

== International broadcasts ==
Country	Channel	Language	Subtitles
Indonesia	RCTI Jakarta	Indonesian	
Malaysia	TV9; Kuala Lumpur	Indonesian	Malay
