= Anggika Bölsterli =

Indonesian actress (born 1995)

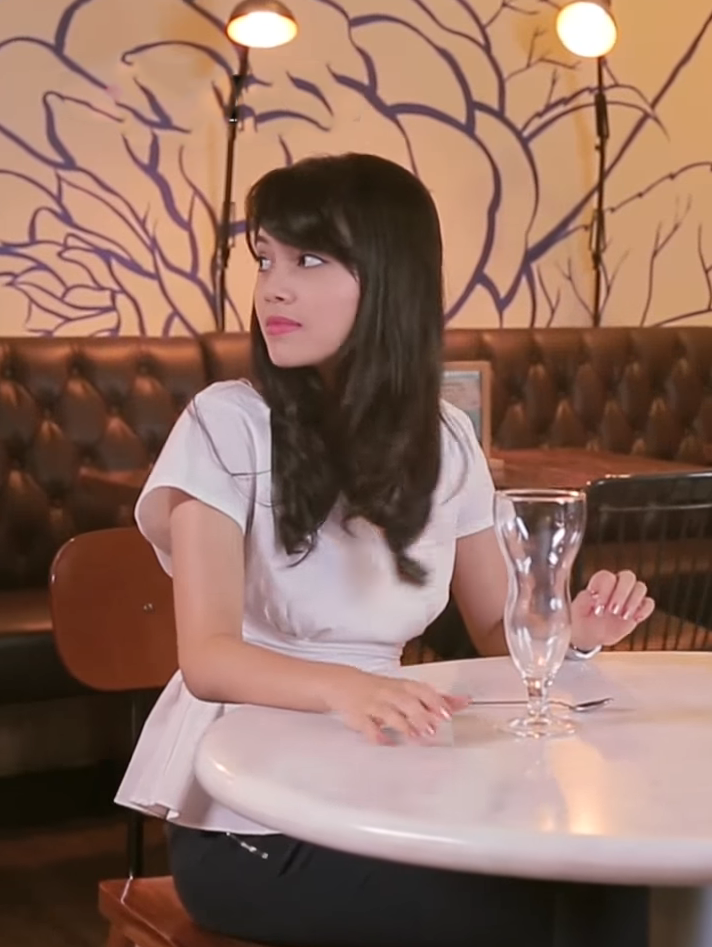
- Bölsterli in 2017
- Born: Anggika Sri Bölsterli; 21 June 1995 (age 31); Jakarta, Indonesia
- Education: The London School of Public Relations
- Occupations: Actress; Model
- Years active: 2013–present
- Spouse: Omar Armandiego (m. 2024)
- Children: 1
- Parents: Pieter Bölsterli (Father); Titin (Mother)
- Relatives: Lukas Bölsterli (Brother)

Anggika Sri Bölsterli (born 21 June 1995), better known as Anggika Bölsterli is an Indonesian actress. Bölsterli made her acting debut with an appearance in the drama series Terbang Bersamamu and first received recognition for her recurring role in the television series Putri Duyung.

== Early life ==
Anggika was born and raised in the Sunter Agung area, North Jakarta. Her father, Pieter Bölsterli is from Switzerland, while her mother, Titin is from Madiun, East Java. She has a younger brother named Lukas Bölsterli. After graduating from school, Anggika chose to pursue a career in acting rather than accepting an offer to study in Switzerland from her parents. She began to participate in the selection of actors for advertisements and soap operas.

== Career ==
Her debut as an actress was in 2013, playing the role of Allisa in the soap opera Terbang Bersamamu. Anggika's name became widely known through her role as Astrid in the soap opera Putri Duyung.

When she started her career as an actress, she was not fluent in speaking Indonesian. This is because she often uses English and Javanese in her daily life.

== Filmography ==
=== Film ===
Year	Title	Role	Notes
2015	Youtubers	Alexandra	
2015	99% Muhrim: Get Married 5	Sophie	
2016	Koala Kumal	Kinara	
2017	Trinity, The Nekad Traveler	Nina	
2017	Critical Eleven	Keara Tedjasukmana	
2017	Mau Jadi Apa?	Fey	
2018	Target	Herself	
2018	Belok Kanan Barcelona	Farah	
2019	Yowis Ben 2	Mia	
2019	Twivortiare	Wina	
2019	Sang Prawira	Nauli	
2019	Trinity Traveler	Nina	
2019	Eggnoid: Love & Time Portal	Tania	
2021	A Perfect Fit	Tiara	
2021	I	Vina	
2021	Will	Vina	
2021	Survive	Vina	
2021	Ghibah	Firly	
2021	Yowis Ben 3	Mia	
2023	Sijjin	Irma	

=== Television ===
Year	Title	Role	Production
2013	Terbang Bersamamu [id]	Allisa	MD Entertainment
2013–2014	Putri Duyung [id]	Astrid	MD Entertainment
2014	Cowokku Super	Citra	MD Entertainment
2014	Badai [id]	Karin	MD Entertainment
2015	Bromo	Laura	MD Entertainment
2016	Kembar [id]	Bella	MD Entertainment
2017	Surga Yang Tak Dirindukan The Series [id]	Meirose	MD Entertainment
2018–2019	Ini Talkshow	Herself	NET.
2019	Love is Pink [id]	Prilly	Starvision Plus
2019	Firasat	Yuli (Eps 86)	Verona Pictures

=== Web series ===
Year	Title	Role	Production	Distributor	Ref.
2019	Cek Toko Sebelah The Series 2	Sherlyn	Starvision Plus	HOOQ	
2020	Yowis Ben: The Series [id]	Mia	Starvision Plus	WeTV Indonesia; Iflix	
2020	Cek Toko Sebelah: Babak Baru	Sherlyn	Starvision Plus	HOOQ; Netflix	

== Awards and nominations ==
Year	Award	Nomination	Work	Result
2019	Indonesian Movie Actors Awards	Favorite Supporting Actress	Belok Kanan Barcelona	Nominated
2019	Indonesian Movie Actors Awards	Best Supporting Actress	Belok Kanan Barcelona	Nominated
2019	Indonesian Movie Actors Awards	Favorite Couple (with Deva Mahenra)	Belok Kanan Barcelona	Nominated
2019	Indonesian Movie Actors Awards	Best Couple (with Deva Mahenra)	Belok Kanan Barcelona	Nominated
