= Asmirandah =

Indonesian actress and singer (born 1989)

- Born: Asmirandah Zantman; 5 October 1989 (age 37); Jakarta, Indonesia
- Other names: Andah; Maria Wattimena
- Occupations: Model; Singer; Writer
- Years active: 2004–present
- Spouse: Jonas Rivanno (m. 2013)

Asmirandah Zantman (born 5 October 1989), also known simply as Asmirandah, currently going by "Maria Wattimena", is an Indonesian actress and singer. She began her career in the world of entertainment through the soap opera Kawin Gantung.

== Biography ==
Asmirandah was born 5 October 1989, in Jakarta, she is the last child of H. Anton Farmidji Zantman and Hj. Sani Suliwati. She is mixed due to the fact that her father is Dutch and her mother Betawi.

She started appearing in Indonesian soap operas in early 2004. She later progressed to modeling roles in several commercials such as Coca-Cola and Suzuki.

In 2012, Asmirandah published her first collection of short stories, Lovandah.

== Personal life ==
Asmirandah has had a relationship with actor Dude Harlino in the late 2000s, but they eventually separated because of the age difference in 2011. In 2012, she confirmed her relationship with actor Jonas Rivanno despite their religious differences, which established a controversy in the Indonesian culture and has not been approved by Asmirandah's family.

Educated in a devout Muslim family, she converted to Protestantism and was baptized in July 2013, then married Jonas Rivanno in Singapore, on 22 December 2013. She denied the rumors of forced conversion, saying it was voluntary after dreaming of Jesus.

== Filmography ==
=== Feature films ===
- Liar (Wild Ones; 2008)
- Ketika Cinta Bertasbih 2 (When love glorify 2; 2009)
- Dalam Mihrab Cinta (In the sanctuary of love; 2010)
- Jakarta Hati (Jakarta Heart; 2012)
- Rectoverso (Rectoverso; 2013)
- Isyarat (Signal; 2013)

=== Soap operas ===
- Kawin Gantung 2
- Inikah Rasanya
- Cinta SMU 2
- Arti Cinta
- Maha Kasih 2
- Kau Masih Kekasihku
- Wulan
- Baby Doll
- Melody
- Aisyah
- Nona Dewa
- Hingga Akhir Waktu
- Kau Masih Kekasihku
- Sekar
- Nikita
- Kemilau Cinta Kamila
- Dari Sujud Ke Sujud
- Binar Bening Berlian
- Iskul Musikal
- Separuh Aku
- Mutiara Dari Surga

== Discography ==
- Ketulusan Cinta (2009)
- Salahkah Kita (2009)
- Bunga-Bunga Cinta (2010)
- Lagu Tema Agu Inkin Kamu (2011)
- Aku Jatu Hati (2012)
- Kesetiaanmu Selamatkanku (2015)

== Advertisements ==
- AC Sharps
- XL
- Fatigon C Plus
- Coca-Cola
- Gery Cokluut & Gery Saluut
- Rexona
- Pucelle
- Suzuki Spin
- Vitacimin
- Axe
- IM3 Indosat
- SkinWhite
- Mito
- Bontea Green
- AC Sharp Sayonara V
- Head & Shoulders
- Kendra
- Homyped
- Biore
- Fatigon C+

== Video Clips ==
Year	Title	Artist
2006	Benci Bilang Cinta	Radja
2009	Salahkah Kita	RobinHood
2011	Dalam Mihrab Cinta	Afgansyah Reza
2011	Bunga-Bunga Cinta	Dude Harlino
2012	Malaikat Cinta	Kapten
2012	Ikhlas	Radja

== Awards and nominations ==
Year	Award	Category	Recipients	Results
2012	Panasonic Gobel Awards	Favorite Actress	Asmirandah	Won
2013	Nickelodeon Indonesia Kids' Choice Awards	Favorite Actress	Asmirandah	Won
