= Bidadari Takut Jatuh Cinta =

- Genre: Musical Comedy Drama
- Created by: ASP Productions
- Written by: Syaiful Drajat
- Directed by: Syaiful Drajat
- Starring: Umay Shahab (as Guntur); Gritte Agatha; Endy Arfian; Chantiq Schagerl; Sharon Sahertian; Bagas Dwi Rizqi Hidayat; Jose Christian; Ajil Ditto; Mpok Atiek
- Opening theme: Sheila On 7, "Sahabat Sejati"
- Ending theme: Sheila On 7, "Sahabat Sejati"
- Country of origin: Indonesia
- Original language: Indonesian
- No. of episodes: 50

Production
- Executive producer: Nasrul Warid
- Producer: Syaiful Drajat
- Production locations: Bekasi, Indonesia
- Cinematography: Boney Hutabarat
- Running time: One hour (17:00-18:00pm Indonesia West Time)
- Production company: Amanah Surga Productions

Original release
- Network: SCTV
- Release: November 17, 2014 – January 16, 2015

Bidadari Takut Jatuh Cinta is an Indonesian soap opera musical comedy drama produced by Amanah Surga Productions that airs daily on SCTV. The cast includes Umay Shahab, Gritte Agatha, Endy Arfian, Chantiq Schagerl, and Sharon Sahertian, with cameo appearances from actors from Indonesian films and television.

== Cast ==
- Umay Shahab as Guntur
- Gritte Agatha as Bintang
- Endy Arfian as Surya
- Hanggini Purinda Retto as Raisa
- Aldy Rialdy as Topan
- Chantiq Schagerl as Pelangi
- Sharon Sahertian as Bulan
- Ajil Ditto as Boy
- Jose Christian as Ray
- Bagas Dwi Rizqi Hidayat as Jay
- Fay Nabila as Mona
- Adzwa Aurell as Venus
- Mpok Atiek as Hepi
- Teddy Syah as Surya's father
