= Diah Permatasari (actress) =

Indonesian actress and model

- Born: 25 January 1971 (age 55); Solo, Central Java, Indonesia
- Education: George Mason University
- Occupations: Actress; model
- Years active: 1989 - present
- Height: 170 cm (5 ft 7 in)
- Spouse: Anton Wahyu Jatmiko (m. 1997)
- Children: 2

Diah Permatasari (born 25 January 1971) is an Indonesian actress and model. She became popular with the public after starring in the film Si Manis Jembatan Ancol.

== Career ==
She began her career as a model, and was a finalist in Wajah Femina in 1989. She has starred in films such as Barang Titipan, Salah Pencet, Bebas Aturan Main, Si Manis Jembatan Ancol, Saya Duluan Dong, and Malam Suro di Rumah Darmo. In 2014, she played Cenayang in the horror film Malam Suro di Rumah Darmo. On television, she has appeared in soap operas such as Bidadari, Panji Manusia Millenium, Mutiara Cinta, Dewi Fortuna, Iman, Taubat, Upik Abu dan Laura, Seruni, Arti Sahabat, Anugerah, Binar Bening Berlian, Saudara Oesman, Karunia, Akibat Pernikahan Dini, and others.

== Personal life ==
She married Anton Wahyu Jatmiko on 5 April 1997. They have two sons.

== Filmography ==
=== Film ===
Year	Title	Role	Notes
1991	Barang Titipan		
1992	Salah Pencet	Lola	
1993	Bebas Aturan Main	Yuli	
1993	Si Manis Jembatan Ancol	Mariam	Lead role
1994	Saya Duluan Dong	Yuli	
2014	Malam Suro di Rumah Darmo	Cenayang	Lead role
2019	Imperfect: Karir, Cinta & Timbangan		

=== Television ===
- Mutiara Cinta
- Si Manis Jembatan Ancol
- Panji Manusia Millenium
- Keluarga Cemara
- Bidadari
- Indra Keenam
- Mody Juragan Kost
- Wiro Sableng
- Hati yang Terpilih
- Dewi Fortuna
- Buah Hati Yang Hilang
- KehendakMu Spc. Anissa
- Warkop episode Cewek OK Cowok OK
- Lola dan Liliput
- Pura-Pura Buta
- Iman
- Taubat
- Upik Abu dan Laura
- Seruni
- Arti Sahabat
- Anugerah
- Binar Bening Berlian
- Saudara Oesman
- Karunia
- Akibat Pernikahan Dini
- Warkop Millennium
- Ganteng Ganteng Serigala Returns
- Ada Si Manis di Jembatan

=== Film Television ===
- Sang Petinju
- Terjebak
