= Jennifer Coppen =

Indonesian actress

Jennifer Coppen Hubner
- Born: Jennifer Rochelle Coppen; July 20, 2001 (age 25); Denpasar, Bali, Indonesia
- Occupations: Celebrity, singer, content creator
- Years active: 2016–present
- Spouse: Yitta Dali Wassink (m. 2023; died 2024) Justin Quincy Hubner (m. 2026)
- Children: Kamari Sky Wassink

Jennifer Rochelle Coppen Hubner (née Coppen; Dutch pronunciation: [kopˈpə(n)]; born 20 July 2001) is an Indonesian actress, singer, and content creator known for her work in television dramas, web series, and music.

== Early life ==
Born to Dutch dangdut singer, Richardo Benito Eduwardo Coppen, and Hotimah Imaniar. Jennifer's education started with Lollyop Pre school, Lentera Kasih and Jembatan Budaya school Bali. Her parents separated in 2007. She lived with her mother from 2008 until 2013 and from 2014 until 2020 with her father. She finished SMP at Gandhi Memorial school, Bali after which her father allowed her to start her acting career and brought her to Jakarta so she could play a role in the sinetron Romeo & Juminten and finish SMA at Dewi Sartika school, Tebet, Jakarta. Her mother died from acute cervical cancer on 4 November 2017, leaving her to navigate adolescence amid grief.

Coppen stated that her early life was full of struggle due to bullying in school. She attended high school in Jakarta.

== Career ==
Coppen started her acting career as a teenager, debuting in the television series Romeo dan Juminten as Cheryl Suryo Wicaksono. Her breakthrough came in 2017 when she portrayed Caca in the TV series Kecil-Kecil Mikir Jadi Manten. Since then, she has accumulated a versatile portfolio across film, television, and web platforms.

== Filmography ==
=== Film ===
Year	Title	Role	Note
2018	Generasi Micin vs Kevin	Sindy	
2019	Tembang Lingsir	Gladys	
2019	Habibie & Ainun 3	Dina	
2020	Mekah I'm Coming	Tuti Tutanti	
2020	Generasi 90an: Melankolia	Kirana	
2022	Akad	Puti	

=== Web series ===
Year	Title	Role	Note
2019	Negeri 5 Menara	Fathia	
2020, 2022	Pretty Little Liars	Monica Hapsari / Mona	2 season
2021	Kisah untuk Geri	Raini Syailendra	

=== TV series ===
Year	Title	Role	Note
2016	Romeo & Juminten	Cheryl Suryo Wicaksono	Acting debut
2016	Nacita	Ranti	
2017	Best Friend Forever	Yuna	
2017	Rohaya & Anwar: Kecil-Kecil Jadi Manten	Caca	
2017	Kuasa Ilahi	Fruit Seller	Episode: Fruit Seller
2018	Dia yang Tak Terlihat	Melly	
2020	Magic Tumbler Season 3	Mora	

=== Television film ===
- Lope Mermaid in Love (2016)
- Penarik Bajaj Kece Baday (2017)
- Bahu Jalan Hanya untuk Kamu (2017) as Inka
- Jangan Kaya Orang Susah (2019)
- Cenat-cenut Hati Badut Imut (2019)

=== Video clip ===
- "Sweaterku" – Gahtan Sakti (2017)

== Discography ==
=== Singles ===
- "Friends with Benefit" – with Rendyapr and Dycal (2017)
- "Moonlight" – with Bayu Valerinoya (2017)
- "Candu tapi Canda" (2022)

== Personal life ==
On 10 October 2023, Coppen married Yitta Dali Wassink. Wassink was of Dutch and Thai descent (Dutch father, Thai mother) and was commonly known to the couple's followers by the nickname "Papa Dali". The marriage followed the birth of their daughter, who was born on 28 August 2023; Coppen's out-of-wedlock childbirth generated significant online attention in Indonesia.

On 18 July 2024, Wassink, aged 22, was involved in a motorcycle accident in Bali and died from his injuries.
