= Sijjin (2023 film) =

- Poster
- Directed by: Hadrah Daeng Ratu
- Written by: Lele Laila; Ersan Özer
- Produced by: Gope T. Samtani
- Starring: Ibrahim Risyad; Anggika Bolsterli; Messi Gusti
- Cinematography: Muhammad Firdaus
- Edited by: Wawan I. Wibowo
- Music by: Andre Harihandoyo; Rahadian Winursito
- Production companies: Rapi Films; SkyMedia; Legacy Pictures
- Distributed by: Rapi Films
- Release date: 9 November 2023
- Country: Indonesia
- Language: Bahasa Indonesia

Sijjin is a 2023 Indonesian horror film directed by Hadrah Daeng Ratu, produced by Gope T. Samtani and written by Lele Laila and Ersan Özer. It stars Ibrahim Risyad, Anggika Bölsterli, Messi Gusti. It is a remake of the Turkish film Siccîn (2014) and it was released on Indonesian cinemas on 9 November 2023.

== Cast ==
- Ibrahim Risyad as Galang
- Anggika Bölsterli as Irma
- Messi Gusti as Sofia
- Delia Husein as Wulan
- Niken Anjani as Nisa
- Dewi Pakis as Bu Anah
- Oce Permatasari as Bu Farah
- Elly D. Luthan as Bu Tety
- M. N. Qomaruddin as Ikhsan
- Deni Saputra as Aa Syakir
- Bismo Satrio as Bayu

== Reception ==
Gabriella Keziafanya Binowo of Tempo, praised Sijjin for successfully adapting the Turkish film Siccin into Indonesian cultural context. Set in 1990s Banten, the film incorporates local black magic traditions, archaic Sundanese incantations, and traditional musical scoring. The review highlighted the cast's strong performances, the structured five-night escalation of horror, and its unpredictable plot twists.

Endro Priherdityo of CNN Indonesia, praised the localization set in 1990s Pandeglang and the refined narrative structure, along with the visual effects and period-accurate production design. However, he noted that the adaptation closely mirrored the original scene-by-scene while toning down some of its horror elements.
