= Verrell Bramasta =

Indonesian politician and actor (born 1996)

Member of the House of Representatives
- Incumbent
- Assumed office 1 October 2024
- Constituency: West Java VII

Personal details
- Born: 11 September 1996 (age 30)
- Party: National Mandate Party
- Parents: Ivan Fadilla Soedjoko (father); Venna Melinda (mother)

Verrell Bramasta

Verrell Bramasta (born 11 September 1996) is an Indonesian politician and actor serving as a member of the House of Representatives since 2024. He is the son of Ivan Fadilla Soedjoko and Venna Melinda.
