= Cut Memey =

Indonesian model, actress and television host

- Born: Cut Meylani Decy Susanti; December 7, 1980 (age 45); Jakarta, Indonesia
- Occupations: Celebrity, Model, Presenter

Cut Memey (born December 7, 1980) is an Indonesian model, actress and television host.

== Personal life ==
Memey married and later divorced Jacksen Peranginangin. She has a daughter named Anshita Lorenza Agustine.

== Filmography ==
- Film Horor (2007)
- Mau Dong Ah (2009)
- Emak Ingin Naik Haji (2009)
- Safa & Marwah (2009)
- Cinta 7 Susun (2013)
