= 7icons =

Indonesian electropop girl band

- Origin: Surabaya, Indonesia
- Genres: Pop, dance-pop, electropop, electronica, teen pop
- Years active: 2010–2014; 2020–present; 2014–2015 (The Icons); 2016–2017 (ICONS)
- Labels: Keci Music (2010–2014); Princey PJ Management (2013–2016); Icons Entertainment (2016–2017); Bigdonte Entertainment (2020–present)
- Members: Gc; Mezty; PJ; T-Sha; Vanila
- Past members: Angel; Linzy; Natly

7icons (/aɪˈkɒnz/) is an Indonesian girl group formed on 28 October 2010. The group originally consisted of seven members: A.Tee, Gc, Linzy, Mezty, Natly, PJ, and Vanila who departed in 2013; T-Sha was then added to the group after an audition. The group was disbanded in 2014 and reunited in 2020 with members Gc, Mezty, PJ, Vanila, and T-Sha.

== History ==
=== 2010–2012: Beginnings ===
The group was formed by friends from three big cities in Indonesia:

- Surabaya (Angel/A.Tee, Vanila, PJ, Natly)
- Jakarta (Linzy, Grace/Gc)
- Bandung (Mezty)

Members of the group came from various professions: model, fashion designer, dancer, presenter, teacher, college student, and disc jockey. After the initial idea for the group was suggested by A.Tee, they decided to move to Jakarta and bought a small apartment as their headquarters. Whilst searching for a music label, 7icons hired a personal dance coach and took vocal lessons, all of which were self-financed. As the group had large expenditures (for coaches, studio, etc.) and no income, Mezty sold her car to help the group's finances. They later signed a contract with Keci Music.

7icons officially debuted with their first single "Playboy" on 18 April 2011 in the music show "Derings" on Trans TV. 7icons also starred in their own teen drama series Go Go Girls on Trans TV, with "Playboy" as its opening and closing theme. The single was well received, reaching number two on the national music chart in its first week, and then became a TVC jingle in their first TV commercial with Telkom Indonesia. The group's schedule became tighter as their popularity grew, and they performed almost weekly.

Their second single, "Jealous", was released later that year, along with "Penjaga Hati". They held a mini-concert, themed as a pyjama party, as the launch of their mini-album, "Lovable". Their fan base grew throughout Indonesia; a fan club, "ICONIA", was established by their fans. Until the end of the year, 7icons had successfully performed throughout Indonesia. 7icons was the only female group that performed at the concert Road to 2011 Southeast Asian Games, held in Borobudur. To close the year, the group released The Journey of Love, the first full album from an Indonesian girl band, on 21 December 2011. The album is not sold by conventional methods, but via special booths in Naughty Accessories.

In 2012, The Journey of Love was marketed by Naughty Accessories. The group approved the fan club "ICONIA" to become their official fan club, "Official ICONIA". 7icons also played as guests on several private television stations in Indonesia. They had the opportunity to collaborate with Bebi Romeo through his song "Cinta Cuma Satu" on the album Bebi Romeo Mega Hits, received several awards in the fields of music and appearance, and were appointed as "Ambassador(s) of the Environment" in 2012. 7icons also had the opportunity to do a concert collaboration between countries, held in Gangnam, South Korea. They performed "Playboy" and "Cinta Cuma Satu", with "Cinta Cuma Satu" translated into Korean.

=== 2013: Vanila's departure and America release (2013) ===
In early January 2013, Vanila announced she was departing the group on her wedding day, 31 January 2013. The group began an audition in February for a new member, and T-Sha was later selected to replace Vanila. The group got their second own television series, Cinta 7 Susun, a musical-comedy soap opera. The series tells the story of a fictionalized version of the group as they struggle to debut. Vanila appeared in its first three episodes, while new member T-Sha was introduced later on the series. The series premiered on 28 January 2013, three days before Vanila's official departure, and concluded on 10 May 2013.

In the same year, they underwent an image change with the theme of "rebirth". The idea was to go from the reborn phase of life to the mature phase. The concept was launched simultaneously with the launch of their first American single, "Outta Diz World" in March 2013. The single was included on 7icons' compilation album, which is their second album and the first album to be released in the U.S.

The single "Cinta 7 Susun" was also a winner in the television musical program "TOP POP", earning "Top Song of the Day" on 28 May 2013. "Playboy (Bali mix)" won "Top Song of the Day" on 12 June 2013, and the single "Cinta Cuma satu (Korean Mix)" did so on 5 July 2013. In a "Suka Suka Uya" (a talk show on the MNCTV channel) interview with Uya Kuya, Pj (Cute Icon) revealed 7icons' term "Captain Class", their term for the leader of the group; PJ is the Captain in 7icons. 7icons covered Feliz Navidad, included on the Keci Music Christmas Songs Compilation.

=== 2014–2015: Disbandment and rebranding to the Icons ===
Following issues with Keci Music in early 2014, 7icons decided to leave the label and started working self-managed. On 19 August 2014, they released their first single under their own label, "Mana Tahan", an electropop dance single created by Andi from the group 'Beage' and Dwi Andri.

However, in November, PJ announced the disbandment of the group following the departure of A. Tee, T-Sha, and Linzy. It was also announced that the remaining members will rebrand the group as The Icons (stylized as 7he Icons). According to an interview, the group will change their musical style from K-pop to Western with 1980s and 1990s appearances and musical style. It was also revealed that the group is producing their first single. However, in 2015, Mezty announced her departure from the group, citing that other members were abandoning the group.

=== 2016–2017: The Formation of Icons ===
Former members Grace Fransin (Gc) and Natalia Shasanti (Natly), along with Instagram celebrity Marisha Chacha, formed a creative pop girlband, Icons. The group is said to be a "reincarnation" of 7Icons. Their sole single, "Playboy Beautiful", was produced in America and released on 21 March 2016. The group was last seen on mid 2017.

=== 2020–2021: Reunion ===
The group announced their reunion on 28 October 2020 with a new single to be released. The reunion involves PJ, Gc, Mezty, Vanila, and T-Sha. Former member A.Tee won't be coming back due to her contract with another label, while Linzy is now married, and Natly wears hijab. The single "Night and Day" and its music video were released on 25 November 2020. They also launched their own beauty product, Iconskin, at the peak of Shopee 12.12 Birthday Sale.

Their first appearance after a 6-year vacuum was on Pagi-Pagi Ambyar, a variety program which aired on Trans TV. The group has then made several media appearances, but Vanila was never present due to her living in Kalimantan. They released their second single after the reunion in May 2022.

== Members ==
=== Current ===
Stage Name	Birth name	D.O.B	Birthplace	Representation
Gc	Grace Fransin	23 June 1989 (age 37)	Malang	Mysterious Icon
Mezty	Mezty Mez	22 April 1989 (age 37)	Bandung	Sexy Icon
PJ	Putri Ajeng	1 November 1989 (age 36)	Surabaya	Cute Icon
T-Sha	Uty Shaimoery	3 December 1989 (age 36)	Pekanbaru	Rebel Icon
Vanila	Vani Lauw	7 September 1988 (age 38)	Surabaya	Elegant Icon

=== Former Members ===
Stage Name	Birth Name	D.O.B	Birthplace	Representation	Years active
A.Tee (2011-2013); A.T.(since 2014)	Angela Tee	28 September 1990 (age 36)	Surabaya	Boyish Icon	2010-2014
Linzy	Linda Kumala Sari	11 March 1991 (age 35)	Singkawang	Feminime Icon	2010-2014
Natly	Natalia Shasanti	18 December 1988 (age 37)	Surabaya	Natural Icon	2010-2017

== Discography ==
=== Albums ===
- The Journey of Love (2012)
- Cinta 7 Susun (2013)
- 7icons & Friends (2013)
- Kisah Cinta 7icons (2014)

== Single ==
Year	Single	Creator	Year	Album	Label
2011	Jealous	Andrian Warouw	2011	The Journey of Love	Keci Music
2011	Playboy	Dewiq/DJ Sumantri	2011	The Journey of Love	Keci Music
2012	Cinta Cuma Satu	Bebi Romeo	2012	Bebi Romeo Mega Hits	Mega Music & Alfa Records
2013	Cinta 7 Susun	Anda Wardhana & Deni Indrajaya	2013	7icons & Friends	Keci Music
2014	Mana Tahan	Andi Beage	2014	TBA	Princey PJ Management
	Playboy Beautiful	Cakra Dewa	2016	TBA	Icons Entertainment
	Night and Day	Cakra Dewa	2020	TBA	Bigdonte Entertainment

== Music videos ==
Song title	Version	Information
Playboy	"School Girls"	Produced and directed by Trans TV for Go Go Girls
Playboy	"Cheersleader"	Promotional video for Telkom's product, Flexi Gaul Cerdas
Playboy	"Audition"	Directed by Monty Tiwa
Jealous	"Rainy day"	Produced by Reza and directed by Kiki Mariana, Keci Music

Songs	Artist	Music Recording Labels	Years
Best Friend Forever(Sahabat)	Super7	Keci Music	2012

== Television commercials ==
Product	Client	Year
Flexi Gaul Cerdas	Telkom Indonesia	2011
Flexi Froid 2011 Southeast Asian Games	Telkom Indonesia	2011
Susu Bantal Real Good	Green Field Indonesia	2012
The Journey of Love Album Teaser	Keci Music & Naughty Accessories	2012
7icons Looking for a New Icon	Keci Music & RCTI	2013
TVM RCTI	SinemArt & RCTI	2013
Susu Bantal Real Good	Green Field Indonesia	2013

== Awards and recognition ==
In 2012, Mezty received a certificate from the Indonesian Minister of the Environment, naming her as an "Ambassador for the Environment".

== See also ==
- List of Indonesian pop musicians
- Indo pop
