= Binar Bening Berlian =

- Directed by: Sanjeev Kumar
- Starring: Asmirandah Zantman; Celine Evangelista; Irish Bella; Jonas Rivanno; Christian Sugiono; Ashraf Sinclair and others
- Theme music composer: Purwacaraka
- Opening theme: Cinta dan Benci, Geisha
- Ending theme: Cinta dan Benci, Geisha
- Composer: Rofy Satria
- Country of origin: Indonesia
- Original language: Bahasa Indonesia
- No. of episodes: 143

Production
- Executive producer: Elli Yanti Noor
- Producer: Leo Sutanto
- Editors: Hendra K Taufik Kodra
- Camera setup: Sutan
- Running time: 2 hours
- Production company: SinemArt

Original release
- Network: RCTI
- Release: 12 December 2011 – 18 February 2012

Binar Bening Berlian is a soap opera that airs in RCTI. This soap opera is produced by SinemArt. Supported by beautiful actress and handsome actors such as Asmirandah Zantman, Celine Evangelista, Irish Bella, Jonas Rivanno, Ashraf Sinclair, Christian Sugiono, Ari Wibowo, Vira Yuniar, Tia Ivanka, Teuku Ryan and others. Directed by Sanjeev Kumar and story written by Serena Luna.

== Cast ==
Role Player	Roled character	Relation
Asmirandah Zantman	Berlian	Biological daughter of Junus-Fahira, adopted daughter of Dinda
Celine Evangelista	Binar	Biological daughter of Herlina-Hendri, twin sister of Bening
Irish Bella	Bening	Biological daughter of Herlina-Hendri, twin sister of Binar
Jonas Rivanno	Jack / Tegar	Biological son of Karina, adopted of Prima
Christian Sugiono	Mirza	Doctor of Bening, biological son of Karina-dr. Lubis
Ashraf Sinclair	Adam	Biological son of Mita-Bram
Ari Wibowo	Junus	Biological father of Berlian, father of Binar dan Bening, brother of Hendri
Vira Yuniar	Fahira	First wife of Junus, biological mother of Berlian
Tia Ivanka	Dinda	Bram's ex-girlfriend, foster mother of Berlian, Junus's worker
Yoelita Pallar	Herlina	Second wife of Junus, biological mother of Binar and Bening
Sultan Djorghi	Hendri	Biological father of Binar and Bening, Herlina's ex-boyfriend, brother of Junus
Mieke Wijaya	Rossa	Grandmother of Binar and Bening, mother of Junus and Hendri
Teuku Ryan	Bram	Dinda's ex-boyfriend, husband of Mita, father of Adam
Devi Permatasari	Mita	Biological mother of Adam, wife of Bram
Ria Probo	Kirana	Biological mother Tegar and Mirza, wife of dr.Lubis
Lucky Alamsyah	dr. Lubis	Husband of Kirana, biological father of Mirza
Adipura	Prima	Foster father of Jack/Tegar, worker of Bram's family
