= Naysila Mirdad =

Indonesian actress

- Born: Naysila Nafulany Mirdad; Jakarta, Indonesia
- Occupations: Celebrity, Model
- Parent(s): Jamal Mirdad (father); Lydia Kandou (mother)
- Relatives: Hanna Natasya Maria Mirdad (elder sister); Andrew White (elder brother-in-law); Kenang Kana Mirdad (elder brother); Nathana Ghaza Mirdad (younger brother)

Naysila Nafulany Mirdad or better known as Naysila Mirdad is an Indonesian actress of mixed Dutch, Sangirese, Minahasan and Javanese descent.

== Filmography ==
=== Soap operas ===
Year	Title	As	Production
2005	Liontin	Indy/Rianty	SinemArt (RCTI)
2006	Bunga Kasih Sayang	Bunga	SinemArt (RCTI)
2006	Intan	Intan	SinemArt (RCTI)
2007	Maha Cinta		SinemArt (RCTI)
2007	Melodi	Melodi	SinemArt (RCTI)
2007	Cahaya	Cahaya	SinemArt (RCTI)
2008	Aqso dan Madina	Risma	SinemArt (RCTI)
2008	Sekar	Sekar	SinemArt (RCTI)
2009	Isabella	Isabella/Ingka	SinemArt (RCTI)
2009	Doa dan Karunia	Karunia	SinemArt (RCTI)
2010	Dia Jantung Hatiku	Aida	SinemArt (RCTI)
2011	Dewa	Dewa	SinemArt (RCTI)
2013	Jodohku	Dinda	SinemArt (RCTI)
2014	Kita Nikah Yuk	Mawar	SinemArt (RCTI)
2016	Romeo & Juminten	Juminten	Mega Kreasi Films (SCTV)
2016	Istri Untuk Papaku	Tiarra	Mega Kreasi Films (SCTV)

=== Television film ===
- Bingkisan Tujuh Belasan
- Sumi Benci Bule
- Kisah Cinta Samaria
- Untukmu Seluruh Nafas Ini
- Jodoh Pilihan Untuk Ustadz
- Sebaris Ayat
- Bawalah Pergi Cintaku
- Allah Tau Siapa Yang Aku Sayang
- Skandal Cinta
- Nikah pada Pandangan Pertama
- Rindu Sang Ibu
- Jodoh Titipan Tante

== Advertisements ==
- Sozzis
- Krim Ekonomi Putih
- Fanbo
- Coca-Cola
- PLN
- TV Panasonic Viera
- Suzuki Swift
- Bodrex
- Mountea
- Real Good
- Toyota Kijang Innova
- Indomie
- Indomilk
- Bank BRI Syariah
- Lasegar
- Sunsilk
- Citra
- Citroën
- Ambeven
- Colidan
- Diapet
- Mylanta
- Polysilane
- Promag

== Achievement and nominations ==
- 2007: Commendable Actress (television) Festival Film Bandung 2007
- 2007: Actress most favorite nomination Panasonic Awards 2007
- 2009: Actress most favorite nomination Panasonic Awards 2009
- 2010: Actress most favorite nomination Panasonic Gobel Awards 2010
- 2011: Actress most favorite nomination Panasonic Gobel Awards 2011
- 2012: Actress most favorite nomination Panasonic Gobel Awards 2012
- 2014: Couple Soap opera most popular Silet Awards 2014 with Ringgo Agus Rahman in soap opera Kita Nikah Yuk
- 2016: Nominations woman most favorite celebrity Insert Fashion Awards 2016
- 2016: Nominations woman commendable cast of serial television film festival bandung 2016
- 2016: Lead Actress most popular nomination SCTV Awards 2016

== Clip video ==
- ST 12 - Isabella
- Kenang Mirdad dan Ederra - Sedap Betul

== Personal life ==
Naysila Mirdad was raised in a multi-faith family. Her father Jamal Mirdad is a Sunni Muslim whilst her mother Lydia Kandou is a Protestant Christian. Their sons were raised as Muslims, while their daughters were raised as Christians. There are speculations by the media that Naysila Mirdad had converted to Islam because she was dating Roestiandi Tsamanov. However she broke up with Roestiandi and started dating Arfito Hutagalung in May 2022.
