= Tukang Bubur Naik Haji =

Indonesian television series

- Genre: Religion, Comedy, Drama
- Created by: Leo Sutanto
- Based on: Tukang Bubur Naik Haji (television film)
- Directed by: H. Ucik Supra
- Starring: Mat Solar; Nani Widjaja; Andi Arsyil Rahman; Citra Kirana; Uci Bing Slamet; Aditya Herpavi; Binyo Sungkar; Tora Sudiro; Dina Lorenza
- Theme music composer: Purwacaraka
- Opening theme: "Haji" — Opick
- Ending theme: "Haji" — Opick
- Country of origin: Indonesia
- Original language: Indonesian
- No. of seasons: 1
- No. of episodes: 2185

Production
- Executive producer: Elly Yanti Noor
- Producer: Leo Sutanto
- Production location: Jakarta
- Running time: 60–240 minutes
- Production company: SinemArt Productions

Original release
- Network: RCTI
- Release: May 28, 2012 – February 7, 2017

Related
- Yusra dan Yumna

Tukang Bubur Naik Haji the Series (A Porridge-Seller Performs the Hajj the Series) is an Indonesian primetime soap opera that aired on RCTI everyday from 2012 to 2017. The series is produced by SinemArt and based on earlier television film of the same name. The series features a large ensemble cast whose characters lives in a fictional neighborhood, Kampung Dukuh, but mainly revolves around the titular porridge-seller, Bang Sulam (Mat Solar) who lives with his wife, Rodhiyah (Uci Bing Slamet), and Emak Haji (Nani Wijaya). Solar left the show in 2013 for health reasons. His character is said to have left to finally achieve his dream of performing the Hajj; his character is later killed in the 1.001th episode while living in Mecca.

In 2017, the series abruptly ended due to SinemArt's deal to move its programs to SCTV. However, the remaining cast members begin to star on a new soap opera with a similar theme titled "Orang Orang Kampung Dukuh", but with new characters and storylines; however it was soon cancelled.

== Plot ==
Bang Sulam, the titular porridge-seller, makes a living selling chicken congee. He lives with his wife, Rodhiyah, and Emak Haji. Along the way, he earns enough money to perform the Hajj. Unfortunately, he is unable to do so, and dies in the 1,001st episode.

Meanwhile, Sulam's neighbours, Muhidin and Maemunah, hold an inveterate grudge against him.

== Cast ==
| Cast | Character |
|---|---|
| Mat Solar | Sulam |
| Uci Bing Slamet | Rodiyah |
| Nani Wijaya | Emak |
| Citra Kirana | Rumana |
| Andi Arsyil Rahman | Robby |
| Aditya Herpavi | Rahmadi |
| Alice Norin | Rere |
| Latief Sitepu | Muhidin |
| Shinta Muin | Maemunah |
| El Manik | Ustaz Zakaria |
| Binyo Sungkar | Tarmizi |
| Rusdi Syarief | Malih |
| Dorman Borisman | Rasyidi |
| Lulu Zakaria | Rasuna |
| Derry Sudarisman | Mahmud |
| Nova Soraya | Romlah |
| Edy Oglek | Kardun |
| Wingky Harun | Aki Daud |
| Etty Sumiati | Nini Leha |
| Anwar Fuady | Pak Debong |
| Ujang Ronda | Sobari |
| Ricky Malau | Ali Subadar/Badar |
| Rico Tampatty | Pak Nur |
| Cut Keke | Bu Retno |
| Yadi Timo | Syairun |
| Marini Zumarnis | Umi Maryam |
| Mega Aulia | Atikah |
| Ravi Romario | Joni |
| Salim Bungsu | Mang Ojo |
| Tyas Wahono | Ustaz Sultoni |
| Intan Pramita Dewi | Laila |
| Dewi Alam Purnama | Soimah |
| Abdel Achrian | Nelan |
| Hamka Devito Siregar | Tulang Togu |
| Juan Christian | Farid |
| Annisa Trihapsari | Rumi |
| Mat Oli | Syafei |
| Ali Syakieb | Jamal |
| Cut Syifa | Maesaroh |
| Anna C Pinem | Tiyah |
| Chelssie Baker | Catherine |
| Johan Jehan | Ngadimin |
| Adam Rama | Hisyam |
| Zahwa Aqilah | Khofifah |
| Lenny Charlotte | Mak Enok |
| Asri Welas | Epih |
| Ben Kasyafani | Fauzi/Oji |
| Lian Firman | Rahman |
| Connie Sutedja | Iroh |
| Najwa Shakira | Anggi |
| Mohammad Noor Ali | Bayu |
| Sisy Syahwardi | Neneng Markoneng |
| Sisca Liana | Eti Suketi |
| M. Husni Iskandar | Sakyad |
| Torro Margens | Drs. Suroso Kimpling/Mbah Suroso |
| Aspar Paturusi | Pak Lamaka |
| Ryan Septiandy | Iqbal |
| Erica Putri | Nanin |
| Merry Mustaf | Elsa |
| Willa Julaiha | Encum |
| Tika Putri | Mutiara |
| Nadya Almira | Laksmi |
| Kiki Farrel | Firman |
| Lucky Perdana | Zaki |
| Irwan Chandra | Koh Wan Wan |
| Ayu Andriana | Ci lenny |
| Qheyla Zavyera Valendro | Jessy |
| Salman Alfarizi | Koh Acong |
| Amelia Ekawati | Ulah |
| Ashraf Sinclair | Reyhan |
| Fathir Muchtar | Fahmi |
| Dina Lorenza | Riyamah |
| Shandy Ishabella | Sofiana |
| Cholidi Asadil Alam | Ustaz Ghofar |
| Muhammad Rafiq Habibi | Habibie |
| Rio Reifan | Restu |
| Iang Darmawan | Mang Engkos |
| M. Syafi | Raun |
| Panji Wardana | Romi |
| Rahmi Nurullina | Nafisah |
| Rimma Bachmid | Raisa |
| Yono Daryono | Mang Damin |
| Syamsul Gondo | Toha |
| Gilang Rino | Kirno |
| Ucha Limau | Rojik |
| Tengku Firmansyah | Anshori |
| Cindy Fatika Sari | Luthfia |
| Celine evangelista | Ketty |
| Afrizal Anoda | Taslim |
| Ian Bactiar | Raiz |
| Romi Pratama Putra | Iping |
| Tora Sudiro | Maul |
| Yachyal Zas | Husin |

=== Special appearances ===
- Kristen Bauer (Deputy Ambassador of the United States)
- Ustadz Yusuf Mansur
- Hary Tanoesoedibjo
- Wiranto
