= Dude Harlino =

Indonesian actor

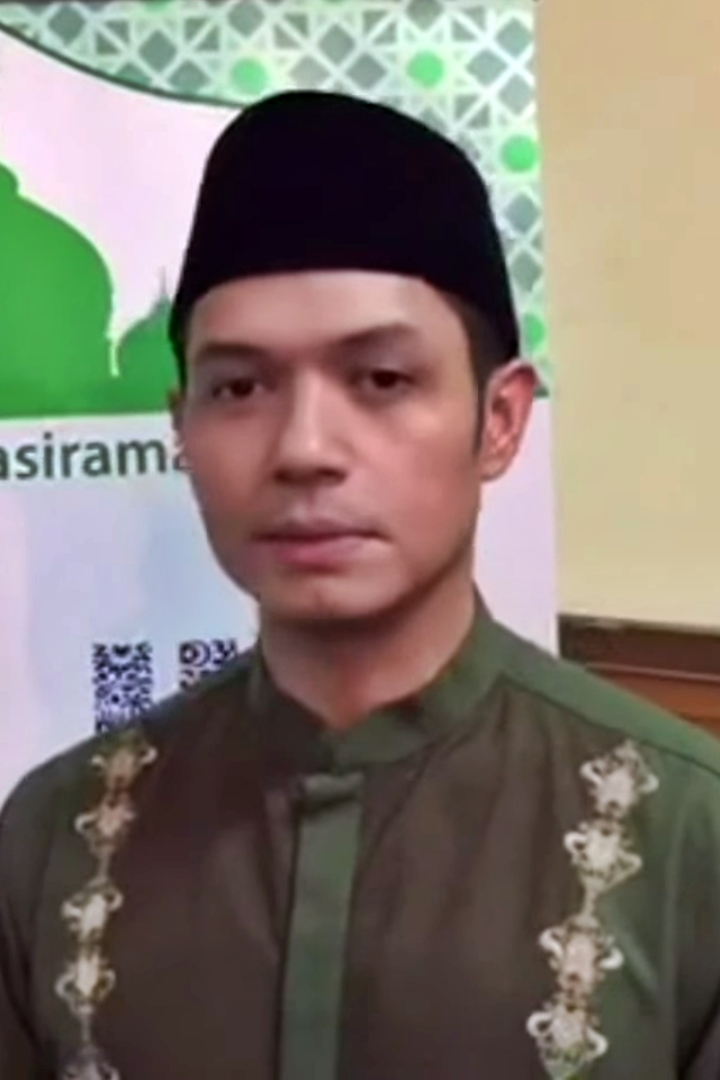
- Dude Harlino in May 2017
- Born: December 2, 1980 (age 45); Jakarta, Indonesia
- Occupations: Celebrity, Model
- Years active: 1999 - present
- Spouse: Alyssa Soebandono (m. 2014)
- Children: 3
- Parent(s): Haidir Hanif (father); Ermy Syukur (mother)

Dude Harlino (born 2 December 1980) is an Indonesian actor and model of Minangkabau descent.

== Biography ==
Dude Harlino was born in Jakarta on 2 December 1980 and his name, Dude, is taken from the Indonesian form of his birthdate, Dua December. He attended the banking program at the University of Indonesia, graduating in 1999.

He acted in the sinetron (Indonesian soap opera) Di Sini Ada Setan, as well as its film adaptation. In 2009 it was reported that he earned Rp 25 million (US$3,000) per episode.

In 2011, Dude Harlino played an uztad in Ketika Cinta Bertasbih 2. That year he also opened his first entrepreneurial venture, Sushi Miya8i, with several other entertainers. He has expressed interest in opening a private school in the near future.

== Style ==
Nauval Yazid, writing for the Jakarta Globe, notes that Harlino tends to play characters who are moral yet spiritually conflicted.

== Recognition ==
Dude Harlino received the Panasonic Award for favourite actor in 2007 the following year, he was nominated in the Best Actor category. He won the Panasonic Award for favourite actor again in 2010.

== Personal life ==
Dude Harlino has often played alongside Naysila Mirdad as lovers, leading to the two being called the "Dunay Lover"; at the time the two were also reported to be dating, although both denied it. As of 2009, Dude Harlino is dating Asmirandah, with whom he costarred in Dalam Mihrab Cinta. But the relationship ended in December 2011 shortly after announcing their engagement because she left him for Jonas Rivanno.

Dude Harlino is known as a devout Muslim, who often prays on set while filming. He has expressed interest in becoming a preacher of Islam if he is no longer able to act.

== Filmography ==
=== Feature films ===
- Tusuk Jelangkung (Stab of the Jelangkung 2002)
- Di Sini Ada Setan (Here is Satan 2003)
- Gue Kapok Jatuh Cinta (I Give Up on Falling In Love 2005)
- Ketika Cinta Bertasbih 2 (2009)
- Dalam Mihrab Cinta (Shielded by Love 2010)

=== Soap operas ===
- Janji Hati 2 (The Heart's Promise 2 1999)
- Tersanjung 2 (Pleased 2 1999)
- Bidadari 1 (Angel 1 2000)
- Kalau Cinta Jangan Marah (When in Love, Don't Be Angry 2001)
- ABG ("The Teen" 2001)
- Sephia (2002)
- Siapa Takut Jatuh Cinta (Who Is Afraid of Falling In Love 2002)
- Yang Muda Yang Bercinta (The Young Fall in Love 2002)
- Cintaku Di Kampus Biru (My Love on the Blue Campus 2003)
- Who Ai Ni Indonesia (2003)
- Disini Ada Setan (There are Devils Here 2003)
- Kisah Sedih Di Hari Minggu (A Sad Story on Sunday 2004)
- Bawang Merah Bawang Putih (Onion and Garlic 2004)
- Kisah Adinda (Adinda's Story 2004)
- Cewek Cewek Badung (The Naughty Girl 2004)
- Ada Apa Denganmu (What's Up With You 2005)
- Dara Manisku (My Sweet Maiden 2005)
- Khayalan Tingkat Tinggi (High-level Imagining 2005)
- Cincin (Ring 2006)
- Dua Hati (Two Hearts 2006)
- Anakku Bukan Anakku (My Child is Not My Child 2006)
- Pintu Hidayah (Door to Blessings 2006)
- Intan (2006 - 2007)
- SurgaMu (Your Heaven 2007)
- Maha Kaish (The All-Giving 2007)
- Maha Cinta (The All-Loving 2007)
- Kakak Iparku 17 Tahun (My Older Sibling-in-law is 17 Years Old 2007)
- Janji (Promises 2007)
- Aisyah (2007)
- Cahaya (Light 2007)
- Aqso & Madina (2008)
- Nikita (2009)
- Manohara (2009)
- Doa dan Karunia (Prayer and Blessings 2009)
- Seindah Senyum Winona (As Beautiful as Winona's Smile 2009)
- Ketika Cinta Bertasbih Spesial Ramadhan (2010)
- Dia Jantung Hatiku (S/he's My Heart and Soul 2010 - 2011)
- Ketika Cinta Bertasbih Meraih Ridho Ilahi (2011)
- Dari Sujud Ke Sujud (From Sujud to Sujud; 2011)
- Dewa (2011)
- Jodohku ("My Mate" 2013)
- Cinta Anak Cucu Adam (2014)
- FTV Pintu Langit (2023)
