= Jonas Rivanno =

Indonesian actor (born 1987)

- Born: Jonas Rivanno Wattimena; March 20, 1987 (age 39); Surabaya, East Java, Indonesia
- Occupations: Celebrity, Model
- Spouse: Asmirandah (m. 2013)

Jonas Rivanno Wattimena (born March 20, 1987), also known as Vanno or Rivanno, is an Indonesian actor and model. He began his career as a model after winning in 2007 the parade sponsor Coverboy by Aneka Yess.

== Career ==
Jonas Rivanno was born in Surabaya, Indonesia, on March 20, 1987, to Agustinus Wattimena and Leony Pattipeilohy. He is the second of the couple's three children. he has an older sister and a younger sister. Wattimena is of Eurasian descent; his father is of mixed Ambonese and Indo descent, while his mother is of mixed Chinese and Indo descent.

Before beginning his modeling career, he simultaneously studied environmental engineering at Sepuluh Nopember Institute of Technology and electronics industry at Electronic Engineering Polytechnic Institute of Surabaya.

His first role was in the romantic soap opera Khanza alongside the Indonesian actress Velove Vexia. The success was such that the series experienced a remake named Khanza 2 in 2014, but Wattimena did not wish to resume its role as Nino, who was one of the main characters of the series.

He became really popular with the public in 2009 after playing in the series Nikita with Dude Herlino and Nikita Willy. It will be precisely during the filming he met his girlfriend, award-winning artist, Asmirandah. This is, however, that the first time he played alongside Andah, who will become his future wife. Since thereafter, they play together in the drama soap Kemilau Cinta Kamila, or it acts as Fadil, a man who agrees to marry for love Kamila, played by Andah, though pregnant with another man.

In 2011, Jonas Rivanno Wattimena and Andah, playing for the third consecutive time in the romantic soap opera Binar Bening Berlian, again they embodied the role of a couple of young lovers who eventually married during the last season. Shortly after the end of the series in 2012, they finally officially reveal their relationship after a long wait.

== Personal life ==
On 29 January 2014, Jonas Rivanno Wattimena and Asmirandah announced their intention to marry in Singapore, on 22 December 2013. The couple eventually celebrated a wedding ceremony, February 28, 2014, in Saparua in the province of Maluku.

In 2014, he became the brother-in-law of the indonesian singer Donnie Sibarani, who is the vocalist of pop-rock band ADA Band. Donnie was married to his younger sister, Sonya Prischillia Wattimena.

== Filmography ==
=== Television appearances ===
- 2008: Khanza - (translated: Khanza) - (soap opera)
- 2008: Kawin Masal (translated: Mass Mating) - (soap opera)
- 2009: Nikita (translated: Nikita) - (soap opera)
- 2010: Kemilau Cinta Kamila (translated: Sheen Love Kamila) - (soap opera)
- 2011: Anugerah (translated: Boon) - (soap opera)
- 2011: Binar Bening Berlian (translated: Bright Clear Diamond) - (soap opera)
- 2018 : Siapa Takut Jatuh Cinta (translated : Who's Afraid of Falling in Love) - (soap opera)
- 2018 : Cinta Suci (translated : Sacred Love) - (soap opera)
- 2020 : Samudra Cinta (translated :Ocean of Love) - (soap opera)
- 2022 : Aku Bukan Wanita Pilihan (translated : I'm Not a Chosen Woman) - (soap opera)

=== Film appearances ===
- 2013: Cinta Semalam (translated: Love Overnight) - (telefilm)
- 2013: Roti Buaya (translated: Crocodile Bread) - (telefilm)
- 2013: Asmara dibawah Hujan (translated: Romance Under The Rain) - (telefilm)
- 2013: Isyarat (translated: Signal)

== Video clips ==
- Akhir Yang Indah (Beautiful End with Astoria; 2012)
- Yesus Aku Cinta (I Love Yesus with Asmirandah; 2015)

== Advertisement ==
- Honda Fit (with Randy Pangalila)
- Nivea
- Suzuki
