= Fatwa on religious pluralism, liberalism, and secularism =

2005 Islamic legal opinion

Indonesian Ulema Council Fatwa no.7/National Congress VII/MUI/11/2005 about religious pluralism, liberalism and secularism
- Created: 19-22 Jumada al-Thani 1426 AH (26-29 July 2005 CE)
- Commissioned by: Indonesian Ulema Council
- Signatories: Ma'ruf Amin; Hasanuddin
- Subject: Declaration of reformist Islamic thoughts based on pluralism, liberalism and secularism as haram

In July 2005, Indonesian Ulema Council (MUI), a semi-official Islamic clerical body of Indonesia, issued a fatwa, or an Islamic legal opinion, against religious pluralism, liberalism, and secularism. The issuance of fatwa garnered substantial controversy and scholarly attention. The fatwa addressed the reformist trend of Islam which had been popular among the broad Indonesian society over the past 25 years. Such trends advocated for a more substantive reading of the Quran and Hadith, instead of literalist approaches taken by the majority of ulamas (Islamic clerics). MUI considered such ideas as incompatible with Islamic teaching, releasing the fatwa to promote a more literal reading of the Islamic scriptures. The fatwa was heavily criticized by progressive Muslim intellectuals.

== Background ==
Indonesian Ulema Council (MUI) was established in 1975 by the Suharto regime, aimed at monopolization of the Islamic orthodoxy in Indonesia at the direction of the government. After the fall of Suharto in 1998 and the beginning of reformasi era, MUI was pressed to reformulate its role within the society. Initially, MUI aligned with B. J. Habibie who was deemed to be more friendly toward the political demand of puritanical Muslims. Habibie withdrew from the 1999 election, and Abdurrahman Wahid, (Note: Abdurrahman Wahid had been critical against the Suharto regime and to an extension the role of MUI, and advocated for the stripping off of MUI from the position as the semi-official clerical body.) a progressive figure, was elected as president from 1991 to 2001. Through the course, MUI lost its pipe with the government, prompted them to be an independent organization. They sought to establish its position as a religious authority representing the Muslim society.

Suharto, during his rule, heavily suppressed the political Islamic movements and forced them to align with the state ideology of Pancasila. During this time, liberal and progressive interpretations of Islam gained societal traction. This includes neo-modernism, a derivation of reformist Islamic modernism which inclined toward more substantive reading of the Islamic scripture. The substantive reading was justified as accommodating the societal reality of Indonesia as a religiously plural and secular state. Abdurrahman Wahid, then chairman of Nahdlatul Ulama, was among the proponents of such ideas. The ideas were controversial especially among the ulamas, and puritanical organizations such as Indonesian Islamic Dawah Council (DDII) had been consistently criticizing them.

After the collapse of Suharto regime, the substantive interpretations of Islam were succeeded by Liberal Islam Network (JIL) founded in 2001 by Ulil Abshar Abdalla among others. JIL was highly controversial due to Ulil's critical and contextual approach toward Sunnah (traditions and customs). (Note: Some ulamas who formed Forum Ulama Umat Islam (FUUI) already issued a fatwa against JIL and Ulil in 2002, declared him as an apostate who deserves death.) There was also an ascendance of Islamist movements after the democratic transition, formerly suppressed by the Suharto regime. Notable organizations include Islamic Defenders Front (FPI), Hizbut Tahrir Indonesia (HTI), and Indonesian Mujahedeen Council (MMI). These organizations, in addition to DDII, were also staunch critics of the neo-modernist strand as well as JIL and Ulil. MUI, in order to bolster its position as a religious authority, issued eleven fatwas in 2005, incorporating the demands by the puritanical and Islamist bloc of the Muslim society. Among them was a fatwa against Ahmadiyya, a heretic and minority Islamic group, as well as the fatwa against religious pluralism, liberalism, secularism, often collectively called SiPiLis.

== Content ==
Fatwas by MUI consist of three sections; 'consideration', 'reminder', and 'clarification'. 'Consideration' section of the fatwa addresses the background of the issuance. 'Reminder' section provides the Quranic and Hadith accounts to justify the fatwa. 'Clarification' section makes up the core of the fatwa, divided into public and legal certainty sections. 'Public certainty' section delineates definition of concepts brought up in the fatwa. 'Legal certainty' section gives rulings that advised to be prescribed.

Piers Gillespie of the Australian National University translates the 'consideration' section as follows:

(a) Recently there has been a growth of religious pluralism, liberalism and secularism which has been understood in a variety of ways in the community;

(b) This growth of religious pluralism, liberalism and religious secularism within the society has created an uneasiness and a concern to the extent that part of the community has asked the MUI to give some clarification by means of a fatwa in relation to this problem;

(c) Therefore, the MUI feel that it is necessary to formulate a fatwa about the understanding of pluralism, liberalism and religious secularism in order for it to provide guidance to the Islamic community.

He analyses that the (b) section facilitates the MUI's position as a representative of the Muslim society. Overall, the section sets the debate by considering reformist thoughts as problematic.

On the 'reminder' section, several Quranic verses and Hadith accounts are cited. Among them, Al Imran verse 19 and 85 are cited to assure the existence of only one valid interpretation of Islam. Al-An'am verse 116 is cited to warn against the majority of people who believe in liberal interpretations of Islam. Al-Kafirun verse 6 is also cited to clarify that the fatwa is not directed against other religious groups. There are overall eight Quranic verses as well as three Hadith records being used in the fatwa.

'Clarification' section consists of public and legal certainty sections. 'Public certainty' section defines four concepts that are being used in the fatwa, namely religious pluralism, religious liberalism as well as religious secularism. Notably, the idea of religious pluralism and religious plurality are considered separate. Accordingly, the former is an ideology that relativizes all religions. The latter is a condition that different religions live side by side. Religious liberalism is an interpretation dictated by independent thinking. Religious secularism is an idea to demarcate religion into the private realm.

Based on these definitions, on 'legal certainty' section, the fatwa declares religious pluralism, religious liberalism as well as religious secularism as contradictory with Islam. It also commands Muslims not to follow these thoughts. The fatwa states that regarding the issue of aqeedah (creed) and ibadah (worshipping), Islam needs to be exclusive. Accordingly, on the issues not related to aqeedah or ibadah, Muslims can interact with non-Muslims in a way to sustain the religious plurality.

== Response ==
Criticism

The fatwa brought a fierce backlash by progressive Muslim intellectuals as well as traditionalist ulamas. Notable critics include Abdurrahman Wahid and Hasyim Wahid of Nahdlatul Ulama, Ulil Abshar Abdalla of JIL, Azyumardi Azra of the Syarif Hidayatullah State Islamic University Jakarta, Djohan Effendi of the International Centre for Religious Pluralism, M. Syafi'i Anwar of the International Center For Islam and Pluralism, as well as Dawam Rahardjo of the Institution of Religious and Philosophical Studies (LSAF). The board of Nahdlatul Ulama also immediately made a statement to defend both pluralism and secularism of the Indonesian state. The contentions are predominantly centered on the vague definition of pluralism, liberalism, and secularism set by MUI. From the religious perspective, critics questioned the methodology of ijtihad (independent reasoning) employed by MUI, and veracity of which categorizing all liberal Muslims who follow the Five Pillars of Islam as deviant. From the non-religious perspective, the fatwa was criticized as a violation of religious freedom as well as a breaching of freedom of expression.

Defense

Din Syamsuddin, former chairman of Muhammadiyah who served the general secretary of MUI since 2000, as well as several authors including Adian Husaini and Abdusshomad Buchori responded to critics by reiterating the definition as valid. Syamsuddin responded to Rahardjo, who was among the progressive wing of Muhammadiyah, by expelling him from the organization. Syamsuddin's role as MUI spokesperson received criticism from some Muhammadiyah members.

Impact

The fatwa prompted Islamic preachers to avoid usage of the term 'pluralism' during a conversation about interfaith relations. Anti-pluralism speech has been widely made since then, especially in mosques as well as religious magazines with puritanical inclinations. Martin van Bruinessen of Utrecht University marks the fatwa among incidents that catalyze "conservative turn" of the Muslim society in Indonesia.

== See also ==
- List of fatwas
