= Lubis =

Lubis is a surname. Notable people with the surname include:

- Ahmad Zulkifli Lubis (1971–2022), Indonesian voice actor
- Amany Lubis, Indonesian Islamic scholar
- Ansyari Lubis (born 1970), Indonesian footballer
- Fatin Shidqia Lubis (born 1996), Indonesian singer
- Husin Lubis, Indonesian actor
- Mochtar Lubis (1922–2004), Indonesian journalist and novelist
- Nabilah Lubis (1942–2026), Indonesian philologist and writer
- Raja Junjungan Lubis (1906–???), Indonesian politician
- Todung Mulya Lubis, Indonesian lawyer
- Umar Lubis, Indonesian actor and model
- Wafda Saifan Lubis, Indonesian actor and singer
- Zulkifli Lubis (1923–1993), Indonesian military officer
