= Hidayatullah =

Hidayatullah, Hedayetullah, or Hedayatollah (Arabic: هداية الله) is a masculine given name and surname of Arabic origin. It is composed of the elements Hidayah and Allah, meaning guidance of God. Notable people with the name include:

== Given name ==
=== Hedayatollah ===
- Hedayatollah Behboudi (born 1960), Iranian writer and reporter
- Hedayatollah Gilanshah (1907–1986), Iranian Air Force commander
- Hedayatollah Hatami (1914–1988), Iranian political prisoner
- Hedayatollah Khademi (born 1958), Iranian politician and executive manager

=== Hedayetullah ===
- Hedayetullah Al Mamun (born 1958), Bangladeshi civil servant

=== Hidayatullah ===
- Hidayat Ullah (died 2024), Pakistani politician
- Hidayatullah (singer) (1940–2019), Pakistani folk musician, playback singer
- Hidayatullah I of Banjar (died 1595), sultan of the Sultanate of Banjar, Indonesia
- Hidayatullah II of Banjar (1822–1904), sultan of the Sultanate of Banjar, Indonesia
- Hidayat Ullah Khan (born 1956), Pakistani politician
- Hidayatullah Khan, 18th century Mughal vizier

== Surname ==
- Ghulam Hussain Hidayatullah (1879–1948), Pakistani politician
- Ignatius Hidayat Allah (died 1639/40), Syriac Orthodox Patriarch of Antioch
- Mohammad Hidayatullah (1905–1992), Indian politician and judge
- Syarif Hidayatullah, original name of Sunan Gunungjati (1448–1580), founder of the Sultanate of Banten, Indonesia

== Organizations ==
- Hidayatullah National Law University, University in Chhattisgarh, India
- Jakarta Islamic State Syarif Hidayatullah University, or Jakarta Islamic State University, Indonesia
- Hidayatullah (Islamic organization), Indonesian religious and political movement
