= Budhy Munawar Rachman =

Indonesian progressive Islamic scholar (born 1963)

- Born: Budhy Munawar-Rachman; 1963 (age 62–63)
- Education: STF Driyarkara
- Known for: Islamic neo-modernism
- Scientific career
- Fields: Islamic studies
- Institutions: Paramadina University

Budhy Munawar-Rachman (born 1963) is an Indonesian progressive Islamic scholar. He is a lecturer of Islamic studies at Paramadina University and an editor of Islamic journal Ulummul Qur'an. He is influenced highly by the renowned Indonesian Islamic scholar Nurcholish Madjid and considered as the successor of Madjid's strand of progressive Islamic thoughts, namely Islamic neo-modernism.

== Early life ==
Munawar-Rachman received the higher education at STF Driyarkara, majoring in philosophy. STF is an acronym for Indonesian Higher School for Philosophy, which is a unique type of higher educational institution which offers no degrees or qualifications. It is considered that this uncommon educational background equipped him a distinct perspective in his intellectual outlook.

== Career ==
Munawar-Rachman served in multiple positions, including the director of the Center for Islamic Studies at Paramadina University for 12 years from 1992 to 2004, the director of the Institute for Religious Studies and Philosophy (LSAF) from 1992 to 1995, and the founder and the director of Project for Pluralism and Religious Tolerance, the Center for Spirituality and Leadership (CSL) since 2004. Currently, he works at the Program Officer of Islam and Development at The Asia Foundation, aside from his professorship at Paramadina University. He is also the founder of Nurcholish Madjid Society (NCMS).

He also authored more than fifty publications, including Islam Pluralis (Pluralist Islam, 2003), Fiqih Lintas Agama (Interreligious Fiqh, co-author, 2003) and Membaca Nurcholish Madjid (Reading Nurcholish Madjid, 2008). He also has experience on editing multiple encyclopedias related to Islam, namely Ensiklopedi Nurcholish Madjid (Encyclopedia of Nurcholish Madjid, 2007).

== Views ==
While Munawar-Rachman succeeds Madjid's position on progressive Islam, he is also grounded on Islamic orthodoxy and highly regard the importance of fiqh study. He is included in the number of Muslim intellectuals who do not see the conflict between Pancasila ideology and Islam, and seeking to elevate the discourse regarding Islam to more substantive ethical level. He is also inspired by Harun Nasution's neo-Mutazilite thought, leading to his view on the rationalization of religion. He coined the term 'progressive Muslim intellectuals' within the context of Indonesian Islamic intellectual landscape, which aimed at transcending the more conventional traditionalist-modernist dichotomy. 'Progressive Muslim intellectuals' in his definition is broadly defined by the Muslim intellectuals who opposed the 2005 fatwa against pluralism, liberalism, and secularism by Indonesian Ulema Council (MUI).
