= Luthfi Assyaukanie =

Indonesian academic, 21st-century Muslim scholars of Islam

Luthfi Assyaukanie (27 August 1967), is a cofounder of the Liberal Islam Network (Jaringan Islam Liberal, JIL) in Indonesia, a lecturer at Paramadina University, and a research associate at the Freedom Institute.

== Biography ==
Born in Jakarta, Indonesia, Assyaukanie received his early education in religious institutions. He later continued his study at the University of Jordan specializing in Islamic Law and Philosophy. He obtained his Master's degree from the International Islamic University in Malaysia, and received his Ph.D degree in Islamic Studies from the University of Melbourne, Australia.

Before studying in Australia, Assyaukanie worked at Ummat magazine, an Islamic weekly magazine, as an editor. In 2001, together with Ulil Abshar Abdalla, he founded the Liberal Islam Network. While teaching at Paramadina University, he also works at the Freedom Institute in Jakarta.

== Publications ==
Assyaukanie has published two books and has written hundreds of articles mostly in Indonesian. His articles appeared in national magazines and newspapers, including Tempo, Kompas, Media Indonesia, and Jawa Pos. He contributed approximately fifty entries in two Indonesian encyclopaedias published by Ichtiar Baru van Hoeve (Jakarta): Ensiklopedi Tematis Dunia Islam (Thematical Encyclopaedia of Islamic World). 7 vols., 2002; Ensiklopedi Islam Untuk Pelajar (Islamic Encyclopedia for Students). 6 vols., 2001.

Books

- Freedom, the State, and Development: Arief Budiman's Essays (Editor and foreword). Jakarta: Pustaka Alvabet, 2006. Details
- Faces of Liberal Islam in Indonesia (Editor and foreword). Jakarta: Jaringan Islam Liberal: Teater Utan Kayu, 2002. Details
- Politics, Human Rights, and The Issues of Technology in Contemporary Islamic Law. Bandung: Pustaka Hidayah, 1998. Details

Journal articles

- "Democracy and the Islamic State: Muslim Arguments for Political Change in Indonesia". Vol 20 (2004). The Copenhagen Journal of Asian Studies.
- "Bringing Fiqh Back to Urban Areas: Making Sense of Professor Sahal Mahfudh's Idea of Social Fiqh". ICIP E-Journal, Volume 1, Number

== Education ==
- 2006 Ph.D. in Islamic Studies, the University of Melbourne, Australia
- 2003 M.A. in Islamic Studies (leading to Phd), the University of Melbourne, Australia
- 1995 M.A. in philosophy, International Islamic University, Malaysia
- 1993 B.A. in Islamic Law (Major), the University of Jordan, Jordan
- 1993 B.A. in philosophy (Minor), the University of Jordan, Jordan

== Awards ==
- 2002–2005 Australian Development Scholarship, Australia
- 2004 the Melbourne Abroad Travelling Scholarship, Australia
- 1993–1995 the Institute of Islamic Thought and Civilization Scholarship, Malaysia
- 1988–1993 Ministry of Education Scholarship, Jordan
- 1987–1988 Ministry of Awqaf and Islamic Affairs Scholarship, Jordan
