= Hoeve =

Hoeve may refer to:

== Surnames ==
- Henk ten Hoeve (born 1946), Dutch politician
- Jan van der Hoeve (1878-1952), Dutch ophthalmologist
- Willemien Koning-Hoeve (born 1965), Dutch politician

== Companies ==
- Ichtiar Baru van Hoeve (established 1980), Indonesian publisher of encyclopedia and reference books

== Places ==
- De Hoeve, small village in the Dutch county of Weststellingwerf
- Høve, village in northwest Zealand
- Paeltronck Hoeve, typical Flemish farm in Ledringhem, Pas-de-Calais, northern France
