= Islam Yes, Islamic Party No =

Slogan coined by Nurcholish Madjid

Islam Yes, Islamic Party No was a slogan coined by Indonesian Muslim scholar Nurcholish Madjid in his speech at Taman Ismail Marzuki (TIM) in Jakarta, in 1970. The slogan soon became a catchphrase in Indonesia that combatted the notion that voting against Islamic parties was sinful for Muslims.

== Background ==
In the 1950s, Islamic parties in Indonesia propagated the view that Muslims should vote only for partai Islam (Islamic parties). Many Muslim clerics joined the race underlining an approach that disseminated the idea that Islamic votes were related to voters' "afterlife in heaven." It was against this background that the prominent Muslim scholar Nurcholish Madjid launched the slogan "Islam yes, Islamic party no" in the 1970s. The slogan became very popular and eventually enabled Muslim voters to dissociate their religion from their political orientation. Muslims in Indonesia have since become more comfortable in choosing secular parties.

== Theoretical indications ==
Upholding the view that there was nothing sacred about the affair of an Islamic state, Islamic party or an Islamic ideology, Madjid held that Muslims therefore should not be blamed for secularisation of their perceptions of these worldly issues. He criticized the idea of joining human organisations, i.e., political parties, to God which claim divine sanction for their petty interests. He argued that political parties that were exploiting the name of Islam by equating human agenda with the will of God were idolatrous. He maintained that Islam and Islamic parties are not identical to each other, because Islam cannot be reduced to a mere political ideology. In Madjid's view, identifying Islam and Islamic parties is not only wrong, it is also dangerous. Because if one day, and this has already happened, the politicians from Islamic parties commit heinous acts, then Islam as a religion can be seen to be blameworthy. Likewise, if an Islamic party loses, then Islam will be seen to lose. In this context, realising the perceived fallacies of Islamising the political system, Madjid introduced the slogan as a form of criticism of some Islamic societies who made Islamic parties legitimate and sacred in the eyes of Indonesian people.

== Political impact ==
The view conveyed by Madjid almost coincided with the 1971 election. Whether by chance or not, Madjid's view seemed to be in line with what was in the minds of the people. This can be seen from the reflection of people's choice in the 1971 election. Election results show that Islamic parties suffered a crushing defeat. This also became the end of the long journey of Islamic parties since 1955. On the contrary, this was the beginning of the renewal of Islam in Indonesia. The tagline thus played an important role, at a time when political Islam was already experiencing a setback, in reshaping Islam as a spiritual, cultural and intellectual force in the nation which emphasized more on moral and ethical principles rather than formal and legal aspirations.

Many Islamic party leaders accused Nurcholish of 'betraying' the cause of Islam.

== Modern-day relevance ==
Dawam Rahardjo, a prominent Muslim thinker from Indonesia, believed that the slogan put forward by Madjid in 1970 was motivated by problems surrounding Islam and political affiliation of Muslims at that time. It was because Islamic parties representing the Muslim community in the political arena at that time were not yet able to present Islam as an authoritative political movement. Some others have echoed the same view outlining that Madjid opposed political Islam because he saw the condition of Islamic parties which was not yet aspirational and because Islamic parties could not still properly 'ground' the language of religion into the plurality of Indonesian society. Many religious leaders in Indonesia, however, still believe that thoughts of Madjid and his famous jargon are still relevant to modern-day situation.

== See also ==
- Islam in Indonesia
- Al-Ahkam al-Sultaniyyah
- Al-Siyasa al-Shar'iyya fi Islah al-Ra'i wa al-Ra'iyya
