= Amany Lubis =

Indonesian islamic scholar

Amany Burhanuddin Umar Lubis
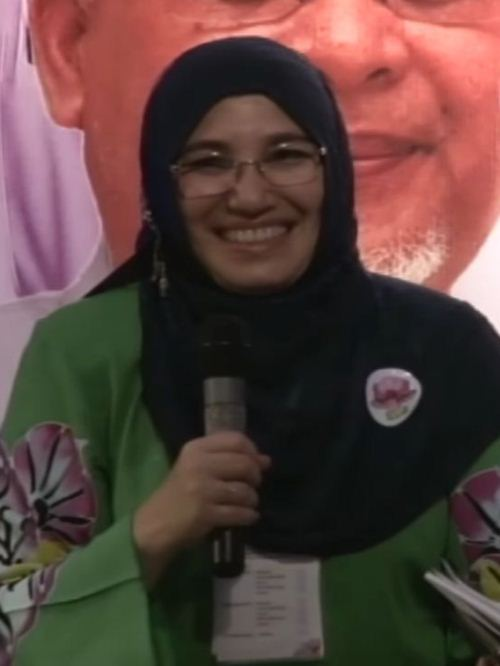
- Amany Lubis in 2016 in Kelantan

11th Rector of Syarif Hidayatullah State Islamic University Jakarta
- Incumbent
- Assumed office 7 January 2019
- Preceded by: Dede Rosyada

Chairperson of the Indonesian Ulema Council for Women, Youth and Families
- Incumbent
- Assumed office 2015
- Preceded by: Unknown

Personal details
- Born: Amany Burhanuddin Umar Lubis; December 22, 1963 (age 62) Cairo, Egypt
- Spouse: Husni Kamal
- Children: 3
- Parents: Burhanuddin Umar Lubis (father); Nabilah Lubis (mother)
- Relatives: Umar Lubis (younger brother)
- Education: Al-Azhar University (bachelor's degree, 1988); Syarif Hidayatullah State Islamic University Jakarta (master's degree); Syarif Hidayatullah State Islamic University Jakarta (doctor's degree, 2002)
- Occupation: Rector of Syarif Hidayatullah State Islamic University Jakarta

Amany Burhanuddin Umar Lubis (born December 22, 1963) is an Indonesian Muslim, female scholar of Mandailing-Egyptian descent. As an Islamic scholar, Amany was appointed as chairperson of the Indonesian Ulema Council for Women, Youth and Families for the 2015–2020 period. On January 7, 2019, she was appointed as rector of the Syarif Hidayatullah State Islamic University Jakarta by the minister of religion affairs of the Republic of Indonesia, Lukman Hakim Saifuddin. Her new position made her as the first woman who served as chancellor of the largest Islamic university in Indonesia, Syarif Hidayatullah State Islamic University Jakarta.

== Biography ==
=== Early life ===
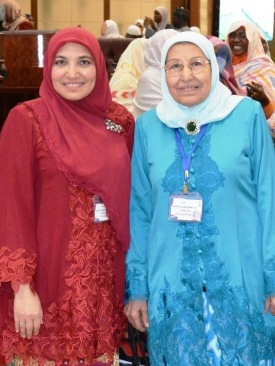
Amany Lubis with her mother, Nabilah Lubis, while participating in the International Muslim Women Union (IMWU) Conference on February 7–10, 2016 in Khartoum, Sudan.

Amany Lubis was born as the first child of four siblings. Her father was a man from Medan with Mandailing Batak blood named Burhanuddin Umar Lubis, while her mother was an Egyptian woman named Nabilah ‘Abdel Fattah. After marrying her father, her mother then added the name "Lubis" behind her name to be Nabilah Lubis.

Amany was born and grew up from an academic family environment. Her father, Burhanuddin, was a graduate of University of Baghdad in the 1960s. Whereas her mother, Nabilah, was a graduate of University of Cairo majoring in Library and Achievement, Nabilah then continued her master and doctoral studies at the Syarif Hidayatullah State Islamic Institute in Jakarta (IAIN Jakarta, Syarif Hidayatullah State Islamic University Jakarta in present day) in the field of Islamic studies (postgraduate program) and philology (doctoral program). Nabilah was the first female doctorate at IAIN Jakarta in 1992. After becoming a doctor, two years later Prof. Quraish Shihab, as chancellor of IAIN Jakarta, then appointed her as Dean of the Faculty of Adab and Humanities.

Amany Lubis is the elder sister of Sri Ilham Lubis, Lc., MPd. (a bureaucrat at the Ministry of Religion Affairs of the Republic of Indonesia), Umar Lubis (Indonesian actor and businessman), and Ustaz Ahmad Shabri Lubis (General Chairman of the Islamic Defenders Front Central Board).

Academic offices
Preceded by Dede Rosyada	Rector of the Syarif Hidayatullah State Islamic University Jakarta; 2019–present	Incumbent
