= Nabilah Lubis =

Indonesian philologist, writer and lecturer (1942–2026)

- نبيلة عبد الفتاح
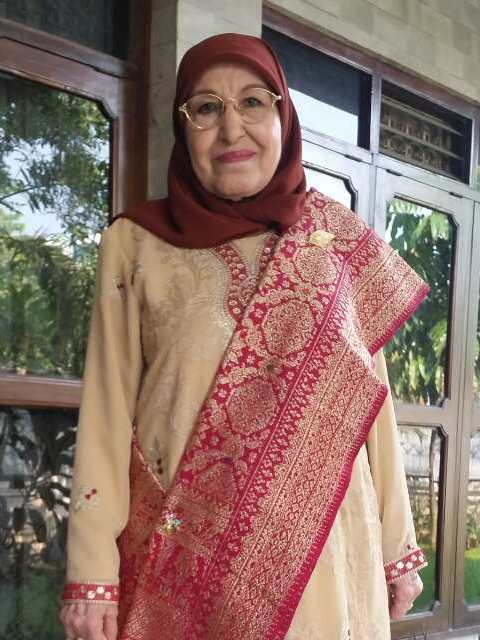
- Born: Nabilah ‘Abdel Fattah; March 14, 1942; Cairo, Egypt
- Died: February 28, 2026 (aged 83); Cairo, Egypt
- Education: University of Cairo (bachelor's degree, 1963); Syarif Hidayatullah State Islamic University Jakarta (master's degree, 1988); Syarif Hidayatullah State Islamic University Jakarta (doctor's degree, 1992); Leiden University (Indonesian Netherlands Cooperation in Islamic Studies program, 1989–1990)
- Occupations: Writer; book translator; philologist; lecturer
- Organization: Muslimat Nahdlatul Ulama
- Spouse: Burhanuddin Umar Lubis (m. 1963; died 2019)
- Children: Amany Lubis; Sri Ilham Lubis; Umar Lubis; Ahmad Shabri Lubis
- Parent: ‘Abdel Fattah (father)

Nabilah Lubis (born Nabilah ‘Abdel Fattah, Arabic: نبيلة عبد الفتاح, romanized: Nabīlah ʻAbd al-Fattaḥ, Arabic pronunciation: [nabiːla ʕabdel fattaːħ]; March 14, 1942 – February 28, 2026) was an Indonesian philologist, writer, translator and lecturer. Nabilah was an Egyptian who was married by a Batak Mandailing man from Medan named Burhanuddin Umar Lubis, so she changed her last name to Nabilah Lubis.

== Career ==
After Lubis completed her doctoral education at the Syarif Hidayatullah State Islamic Institute (IAIN Jakarta, Syarif Hidayatullah State Islamic University Jakarta) in 1992, she became the first female doctorate at IAIN Jakarta. Two years later, in 1994, professor Quraish Shihab as chancellor of IAIN Jakarta appointed her as Dean of the Faculty of Adab and Humanities. Lubis retired from her position as Professor at the Faculty of Adab and Humanities at UIN Jakarta in 2007. She was the Expert Council of the Muslimat Nahdlatul Ulama for the period 2016–2021 with Sinta Nuriyah Wahid and eight other people.

== Death ==
Lubis died in Cairo on February 28, 2026, at the age of 83.

== Bibliography ==
- Masrur, Muhammad (November 7, 2018). "Prof. Dr. Nabilah Lubis: Perintis Kajian Filologi di IAIN" [Prof. Dr. Nabilah Lubis: Pioneer of Philology Studies at IAIN]. BincangSyariah.Com (in Indonesian). South Tangerang: el-Bukhari Institute.
- Yus (December 17, 2008). "Prof Dr Hj Nabilah Lubis: Peran Suami-Istri Sama dalam Perkawinan" [Prof. Dr. Hj Nabilah Lubis: The Role of Husbands and Wives Same in Marriage]. Republika Online (in Indonesian).
- Sadzali, Ahmad (July 10, 2005). "Prof Dr Nabilah Lubis: "Liberalisme Ancam Keharmonisan Keluarga"" [Prof. Dr. Nabilah Lubis: "Liberalism Threatens Family Harmony"]. Hidayatullah.com (in Indonesian).
- Fathoni (March 31, 2017). "Susunan Lengkap Pengurus PP Muslimat NU 2016–2021" [Complete Composition of the Management of PP Muslimat NU 2016–2021]. NU Online (in Indonesian).
- Shaker, Hossam (February 29, 2016). "أم الأزهريات فى إندونيسيا لـ"صوت الأزهر": أحرص على تعليم أحفادى اللغة العربية وأغرس فيهم حب الأزهر" [Mother of Azhariyat in Indonesia for "Voice of Al-Azhar": I am Interested to Teach the Young People of the Arabic Language and Instilled in Them the Love of Al-Azhar]. Al Azhar Observer (in Arabic).
- El Beheiry, Yasser (July 2, 2015). "الأمينة العامة للمجلس العالمي للمسلمات العالمات في إندونيسيا نبيلة لوبيز لـ الجريدة.: رفعة الأمة الإسلامية تبدأ بصلاح نسائها" [Secretary General of the World Council of Muslim Women in Indonesia, Nabilah Lubis to Al-Jarida: The Rise of the Islamic Nation Begins With the Safety of its Women]. Al-Jarida (in Arabic).
