= Marsudi Wahyu Kisworo =

Indonesian professor

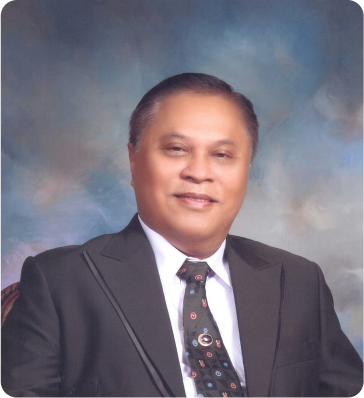

Member of National Research and Innovation Agency Board of Governors
- Incumbent
- Assumed office 13 October 2021
- President: Joko Widodo
- Head of Borad of Governors: Megawati Soekarnoputri

Personal details
- Born: October 29, 1958 (age 67) Kediri, East Java, Indonesia
- Spouse: Taty Adiyanty
- Children: 3
- Education: Bandung Institute of Technology (Ir.); Curtin University of Technology (M.Sc., Ph.D.)
- Occupation: Professor

Marsudi Wahyu Kisworo is an Indonesian Professor of Computer Science currently affiliated with Pancasila University. On 13 October 2021, he was appointed as Member of the Board of Governors of the National Research and Innovation Agency (BRIN) by Joko Widodo.

On 2 May 2024, he was appointed as rector of Pancasila University for 2024-2028 period, replacing previous rector, Edie Toet Hendratno, that fired by the university over sexual crime. However, he was replaced by Adnan Hamid in 2025, just one year he holds the rectorship.

== Early life and education ==
Marsudi is the son of Djoko Susilo, a teacher at a Teacher Education School. Due to his father's mobile assignment, he rarely stayed in one place for very long, constantly moving from one town to another. He enrolled in the Department of Electrical Engineering, Bandung Institute of Technology (ITB) in 1978. He later specialized in Computer System and Engineering during his study here and graduated in 1983. He was worked to a company and later continuing his study to Curtin University of Technology thru AIDAB scholarship in 1989. He obtained his master's degree in computer science in 1990 and Ph.D. degree in computer science in 1992.

== Rise to Prominence ==
=== First Indonesian IT Professor ===
Marsudi was appointed as Professor in the field of Computer Science in 2002. At that time, he was the first Indonesian IT professor. He also advisor of future Vice Head of Corruption Eradication Commission, Bibit Samad Rianto.

=== Founder of Paramadina University ===
Marsudi is one of founders of Paramadina University. He together with Nurcholish Madjid, and friends from Islamic Network, an international Indonesian Islamic student majlis ta'lim, founded the university in 1998.

=== Role in 2019 Indonesian General Election ===
Marsudi was hired by General Elections Commission (KPU) as system architect of KPU for the 2004 election. Together with experts at that time from University of Indonesia, Bandung Institute of Technology, Sepuluh Nopember Institute of Technology, and Paramadina University, he and others build the Election Information System used by KPU. Marsudi play significant role in clearing false allegation that General Elections Commission favoring Joko Widodo - Ma'ruf Amin during hearing at Constitutional Court by explaining clearly how the Election Information System work, not as alleged by Prabowo Subianto - Sandiaga Uno defense team.

== Personal life ==
Marsudi married to Taty Adiyanty in 1985. Their marriage resulted in 3 children.

Marsudi is avid fan of Kungfu and practicing Tai Chi.

Beyond his technical skills, his qualifications includes self-development skills, including Dale Carnegie method, Stephen Covey method, Anthony Robbins method, Neuro-linguistic programming, to even esoteric practices such as Reiki, Prana, Emotional Freedom Techniques, Hypnotism, and Spiritual intelligence. He holds several international certifications as a speaker and motivator.
