= Hatami =

Iranian surname

Hatami (Persian: حاتمی) is an Iranian surname and may refer to:

- Rahim Hatami-ye Yek, a village in Lorestan province, Iran
- Ali Hatami (1944–1996), Iranian film director
- Leila Hatami (b. 1972), Iranian actress
- Sara Hatami (b. 2005), Iranian actress
- Farzad Hatami (b. 1986), Iranian footballer
- Babak Hatami (b. 1986), Iranian footballer
- Mehran Hatami (b. 1964), Iranian basketball coach
- Hedayatollah Hatami (c. 1914–1988), Iranian man allegedly executed in 1988
- Mir Ebrahim Seyyed Hatami (1924–2019), Iranian ayatollah
- Amir Hatami (b. 1966), Commander-in-Chief of the Iranian Army
- Jonathan Hatami (b. 1969), American prosecutor
