= Marsudi =

Marsudi is an Indonesian surname. Notable people with the surname include:

- Prasetyo Edi Marsudi (born 1962), Indonesian politician
- Retno Marsudi (born 1962), Indonesian politician and diplomat

== See also ==
- Marsudi Wahyu Kisworo (born 1958), Indonesian professor and government official
