= Bahtiar Effendy =

Indonesian Muslim scholar (1958–2019)

Bahtiar Effendi (December 10, 1958 – November 21, 2019) was a prominent Indonesian Muslim scholar and public intellectual. He was a professor at the Faculty of Social and Political Science at Syarif Hidayatullah State Islamic University Jakarta. Effendi was widely known for his relentless support for democracy and religious pluralism in Indonesian society.

== Biography ==
Born in Ambarawa, Central Java on December 10, 1958, Effendi graduated from the State Institute of Islamic Studies in 1983 and received a Doctorandus degree from the same Institute in 1985. He obtained a master's degree in Southeast Asian studies from Ohio University, Athens, Ohio in 1988 and received his PhD in political science from Ohio State University in 1994. Returning to Indonesia, in 1995, he began his academic career as a lecturer at UIN Syarif Hidayatullah State Islamic University Jakarta where he served as a professor of political science until his death. He had also served as a Senior Fellow at S. Rajaratnam School of International Studies and Nanyang Technological University (NTU) in Singapore, as well as a Fellow at Victoria University of Wellington, New Zealand. He was a member of the American Political Science Association, the World Conference on Religion and Peace, Indonesian Association of Muslim Intellectuals, and the Indonesian Political Science Association. On November 21, 2019, professor Effendi died at the Cempaka Putih Hospital in Jakarta.

== Selected works ==
- Effendy, Bahtiar. Islam dan Negara: Transformasi Pemikiran dan Praktik Politik Islam di Indonesia. Paramadina, 1998.
- Effendy, Bahtiar. Islam and the State in Indonesia. No. 109. Institute of Southeast Asian Studies, 2003.
- Ali, Fachry, and Bahtiar Effendy. Merambah Jalan Baru Islam: Rekontruksi Pemikiran Islam Indonesia Masa Orde Baru. Mizan, 1986.
- Abdullah, Taufik, Ahmad Sukardja, Azyumardi Azra, Bahtiar Effendy, Budhy Munawar-Rachman, Din Syamsuddin, Hendro Prasetyo et al. "Ensiklopedi tematis: Dunia Islam." (2002).

== See also ==
- Dawam Rahardjo
