= Private Bodyguard =

2024 Indonesian drama streaming television series

- Genre: Drama; Teen
- Based on: Private Bodyguard by Caroline Puspojudo
- Written by: Lintang Pramudya Wardhani; Angga Haryono; Nuridzka Mutiaradini; Seana Zavira
- Directed by: Asep Kusdinar
- Starring: Sandrinna Michelle; Junior Roberts; Fattah Syach; Harry Vaughan; Arya Mohan; Annisa Kaila; Ratu Rafa; Umar Lubis; Dina Lorenza; Imelda Lubis; Roweina Umboh; Alfian Phang; Daniel Leo
- Opening theme: "Kalimat Cinta" by Biancadimas
- Ending theme: "Kalimat Cinta" by Biancadimas
- Composer: Donny Akson
- Country of origin: Indonesia
- Original language: Indonesian
- No. of seasons: 1
- No. of episodes: 15

Production
- Executive producers: David S. Suwarto; Avijit Dutta; Dian W. Sasmita
- Producers: Ferry Lesmana; Taufik Kusnandar; Eri Kuswanda
- Cinematography: Asep Kalila
- Editor: Yori Ramdan
- Camera setup: Multi-camera
- Running time: 30 minutes
- Production company: SinemArt

Original release
- Network: Viu
- Release: 8 March – 20 April 2024

Private Bodyguard is an Indonesian television series produced by SinemArt which premiered on 8 March 2024 on Viu based on the novel of the same title by Caroline Puspojudo. It stars Sandrinna Michelle, Junior Roberts, and Fattah Syach. This series also raises issues of young people's lives at school, including bullying.

== Plot ==
Fely, an orphan who lives in an orphanage. She received a scholarship to one of the leading schools. At the school, Fely met the Four Prince gang, a gang of siblings consisting of Raga, Jordan, Helga, and Naviro. Fely could not keep quiet when she saw injustice happening in front of her. This made Fely the target of bullying by the gang. The situation became even more complicated after Johan Winston—the father of the Four Prince came to the orphanage and adopted Fely as his daughter.

== Cast ==
=== Main ===
- Sandrinna Michelle as Felysia
- Junior Roberts as Raga Winston
- Fattah Syach as Jordan Winston
- Harry Vaughan as Naviro Winston
- Arya Mohan as Helga Winston

=== Recurring ===
- Rafi Sanjaya as Hema
- Zenia Zein as Chloe
- Annisa Kaila as Yolanda
- Sharon Sahertian as Miranda
- Gabriella Quinlyn as Shania
- Fatu Yaffa as Alin
- Kevin Faulky as Kai
- Ratu Rafa as Monica
- Umar Lubis as Johan
- Dina Lorenza as Ida
- Giovanni Tobing as Andre
- Alessia Cestaro as Flora
- Daniel Leo as Rama
- Zahra Rara as Alya
- Imelda Lubis as Alya's mother
- Roweina Umboh as Ari's mother
- Boy Permana as Rio
- Dasha March Relovhel as Felicia
- Gadita Berlian as Chloe
- Varen Arianda as Dino
- Tike Priatnakusumah as Ratih
- Queen Jasmine as Davina
- Alfian Phang as Baim
- Ena Pasaribu as Pegy

== Spin-off ==
A spin-off series, Private Bodyguard Getaway premiered on 30 August 2024.
