= Mahmud Yunus =

Indonesian Minangkabau Islamic preacher and teacher

Prof. Dr. (HC) Mahmud Yunus
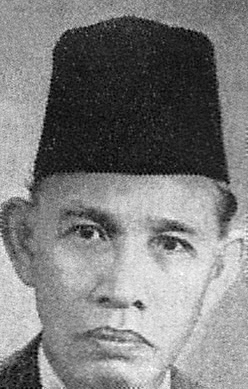
- Mahmud, 1954
- Born: February 10, 1899; Nagari Sungayang, Tanah Datar, Minangkabau, Dutch East Indies
- Died: January 16, 1982; Jakarta, Indonesia
- Education: Dar al-Ulum
- Occupation: Professor
- Known for: Islamic educator, Koran translator
- Parent: Yunus (father) Hafsyah (mother)

Mahmud Yunus (Old Spelling: Mahmoed Joenoes) (February 10, 1899 – January 16, 1982) was an Indonesian Minangkabau Islamic preacher and teacher. He authored over seventy-five books, including Tafsir Qur'an Karim ("Interpretation of the Karim Koran") and an Arab-Indonesian dictionary. His books are used in madrasas and pesantrens. During his employment in the Indonesian Department of Religion, he promoted the incorporation of religious lessons into the national education curriculum. Yunus received an Honorary Doctorate in "tarbiyah" (the teaching of personal development) from IAIN Syarif Hidayatullah, Jakarta. A road to IAIN Imam Bonjol, Padang is named after him.

Early in his career, Yunus taught at a surau and at a Madrasa School of which he was an alumnus. He joined Persatuan Guru Agama Islam (P.G.A.I) the Association of Indonesian Teachers. In 1923, he studied in Cairo, Egypt. In 1931, Yunus returned to the village of his birth. In 1932, he taught in Padang and founded the Normal Islam School. Later, he was the principal of Sekolah Tinggi Islam (S.T.I.) Padang, the Padang Islamic High School.

During Japanese occupation of West Sumatra, Yunus worked for the government on Islamic education issues. Yunus' promotion of Islamic education began with its introduction in Minangkabau. On January 20, 1951, religious studies were adopted as a part of national curriculum. Then, on June 1, 1957, Yunus was appointed the first director of Akademi Dinas Ilmu Agama (A.D.I.A.), the Service Academy of Religious Sciences in Jakarta (Syarif Hidayatullah State Islamic University Jakarta). From 1967 to 1970, Yunus was director of the Institut Agama Islam Negeri Imam Bonjol.

Yunus died on January 16, 1982, aged 82.

== Bibliography ==
- Abdullah, Taufik (2009). Schools and Politics: The Kaum Muda Movement in West Sumatra (1927–1933). Equinox Publishing. ISBN 978-602-8397-50-6.
- Asy, Fauzan (2004). Perkembangan Pendidikan Islam di Nusantara. Angkasa.
- Hashim, Rosnani (2010). Reclaiming the Conversation: Islamic Intellectual Tradition in the Malay Archipelago. The Other Press. ISBN 978-983-9541-74-8.
- Saydam, Gouzali (2009). 55 Tokoh Indonesia Asal Minangkabau di Pentas Nasional. Bandung: Al Fabeta.
- Ibrahim, Amran (2008). Riwayat Hidup H. Ibrahim Dt. Sinaro Sati 1988–1964. Jakarta.
- Kahin, Audrey R. (2005). Dari Pemberontakan ke Integrasi: Sumatera Barat dan Politik Indonesia, 1926–1998. Yayasan Obor Indonesia. ISBN 979-461-519-6.
- Mohammad, Herry (2006). Tokoh-Tokoh Islam yang Berpengaruh Abad 20. Gema Insani. ISBN 979-560-219-5.
- Nata, Abuddin (2005). Tokoh-tokoh Pembaruan Pendidikan Islam di Indonesia. Raja Grafindo Persada. ISBN 979-3654-58-9.
- Nata, Abuddin; Nasuhi, Hamid (2002). Membangun Pusat Keunggulan Studi Islam. Jakarta: IAIN Jakarta Press. ISBN 979-95829-3-8.
- Ramayulis, H.; Samsul Nizar (2005). Ensiklopedi Tokoh Pendidikan Islam. Quantum Teaching. ISBN 979-97811-7-5.
- Yunus, Mahmud (1977). Pengembangan Pendidikan Islam di Indonesia. Jakarta: Hidakarya Agung.
- Yunus, Mahmud (January 1982). Riwayat Hidup Prof. Dr. H. Mahmud Yunus, 10 Februari 1899–16. Hidakarya Agung.
- Yunus, Mahmud (1979). Sejarah Pendidikan Islam di Indonesia. Jakarta: Mutiara Sumber Widya.
