= Jaringan Islam Liberal =

Islamic organization based in Indonesia

Liberal Islam Network
- Zone of influence
- Founder: Luthfi Assyaukanie, Ulil Abshar Abdalla, Nong Darol Mahmada
- Type: Foundation
- Purpose: Social Network
- Headquarters: Jakarta, Indonesia
- Coordinates: 6.194640°S 106.8683378°E
- Region served: Indonesia
- Affiliations: Sunni Islam (Islamic Liberalism)

Jaringan Islam Liberal (JIL) or the Liberal Islam Network is a loose forum for discussing and disseminating the concept of Islamic liberalism in Indonesia. One reason for its establishment is to counter the growing influence and activism of militant and Islamic extremism in Indonesia. The "official" description of JIL is "a community which is studying and bringing forth a discourse on Islamic vision that is tolerant, open and supportive for the strengthening of Indonesian democratization."

It was started from several meetings and discussions among young Muslim intellectuals in ISAI (Institut Studi Arus Informasi; Institute for the Studies on Free Flow of Information), Jakarta, and then extended through discussion using a mailing list in early 2001. The founders held the first discussion on February 21, 2001, at Teater Utan Kayu, Jakarta, on Akar-Akar Liberalisme Islam: Pengalaman Timur Tengah (The Roots of Islamic Liberalism: The Middle East Experience), presented by a young progressive scholar, Luthfi Assyaukanie. That meeting was followed by other discussions, either in the form of face-to-face meetings or through the mailing list.

Since mid-2001, the "official" name of Jaringan Islam Liberal has been used on their website , which displays their activities, articles, discussions, and relevant sources for the dissemination of liberal Islam. Their place of meeting and secretariat is at Teater Utan Kayu, Jakarta, a complex owned by Goenawan Mohamad, a leading journalist and author, and used for arts performances and by non-governmental organizations. By now, the network is led by liberal young thinker, Ulil Abshar Abdalla, who is also the director of ICRP - Indonesian Conference on Religion and Peace.

== Mission ==
JIL interpretation of Islam is based on the principles follows:

1. Open to all forms of intellectual exploration on all dimensions of Islam
2. Prioritizing religion ethics, not literal textual readings
3. Believing that truth is relative, open for interpretations and plural
4. Siding with oppressed minorities
5. Believing in the freedom to practice religious beliefs
6. Separation of world and heavenly authorities, religious and political authorities

For the proponents of JIL, using liberal Islam in the name of their forum is intended to make a clear point. Liberal Islam represents an Islam that emphasizes individual freedom in accordance with the Mu'tazila doctrine of human freedom and liberation of socio-political structure from oppressive and undemocratic domination. The adjective "liberal" for the activists in JIL has two meanings: "being liberal" and "liberating." Islam has always many different interpretations, so liberal Islam is another variant of Islam and an alternative to literal Islam, Islamic fundamentalism, Islamic extremism, and many others.

== Activities ==
Since its inception, JIL has conducted many regular activities concerning public education. With the assistance from funding agencies such as The Asia Foundation, JIL is able to voice liberal, tolerant aspirations and interpretations of Islam in Indonesia. Activities and programs of JIL include:

- Syndication of liberal Islam writers. This is the most important program undertaken by JIL. This program is intended to collect writings from authors who defend pluralism and inclusivism and disseminate them to local mass media which have difficulties in finding good writings and writers on those issues. This syndication provides selected articles, interviews, and sources every week for local newspapers.
- Talk-shows in the news office of Radio 68H, Jakarta. The talk-show, which interviews those who promote pluralism and an inclusive understanding of religion, is broadcast through 40 radio stations on the Namlapanha radio network across Indonesia. This program is the most effective effort to disseminate liberal Islam.
- Publication of books on liberal thoughts in religion.
- Publication of booklets or leaflets which contain a short article, interview, or abstract from books on controversial issues in religion.
- Publication of the JIL website, http://www.islamlib.com, which displays information and relevant writings on liberal Islam.
- Public service advertisements on television which contain messages for religious toleration and peaceful co-existence among different religious followers and pluralism in Islam.
- Discussion of Islam. With cooperation from other institutions, JIL arranges discussions on Islam with distinguished speakers from all over the world.
- Road-show doctrinate the idea of liberal Islam which are held on campuses in Indonesia with the cooperation of student organizations.

Some figures who support or follow liberalism are Ulil Abshar Abdalla, Nong Darol Mahmada, Burhanuddin, Hamid Basyaib, Taufiq Adnan Amal, Saiful Mujani, and Luthfi Assyaukanie.

== Conflicts ==
Ulil in his book "Becoming Liberal Islam" rejects the types of religious interpretation that are not pluralist, or against democracy which he said potentially undermines Islamic thinking. Ulil Abshar candidly criticizes the MUI has monopolized the interpretation of Islam in Indonesia. MUI fatwas stating that Pluralism, Liberalism, and Secularism are misguided ideologies and Ahmadiyah is out of Islam, have kindled Ulil's emotion.

Some Muslims respond to the emergence of liberal Islamic movement in various ways, either with no respond, respond and criticize it intellectually through medias, or with serious response because it has challenged the basic principles of Islam. There are even groups of radicals who justify killing of Ulil and other members of the Liberal Islam Network (JIL), such as Islamic Ulema Forum (Forum Ulama Ummat Islam, FUUI) in Bandung which issued a death fatwa for Ulil Abshar as the chairman of JIL.

Among other controversies deviating from mainstream Islam are JIL believes al-Qur'an is a text needs to be studied Hermeneutically; exegesis based on classical Tafsir books is no longer needed; polygamy must be banned; dowry in marriage may be paid by either the husband or wife; prescribed period ('Iddah) should be imposed on men too, either because of divorce or death; predetermined period Marriage (Nikah mut‘ah) is legal, inter-religious marriage shall be allowed to men and women equally; portion of inheritance to daughters should be equal (1:1) to portion given to sons; a bastard child is eligible for inheritance if his biological father is known.

In 2003, Ulil Abshar is sentenced to death by a fatwa issued by several ulama in FUUI declaring Liberal Islam has misguided and derailed from the teachings of Islam due to JIL's article which is considered an insult and distort the truth of religion. Habib Rizieq mentions that Liberal Islam is a "Plagiarist of thinking", because its ideas simply imitate the ideas of previous orientalists who began the reforms, especially in understanding and assessing Islam.

According to Habib Rizieq, The Indonesian's Liberal Islam movement rants excitedly to the application of Hermeneutics in the studies of the Qur'an. In fact, long before JIL resonating the matter, an Assyrian reverend named Alphonse Mingana (1881–1937), who was also a lecturer of Christian Theology at Birmingham University, in his book "Syriac Influence on The Style of The Koran" published in 1927 states: "It is time to criticize the text of the Qur'an, as we have done to the Aramaic Jewish Torah and Greek Christian bibles." Rizieq furthermore says that the JIL is just a group of inferior people with "intellectual backwardness" disease, which according to him, has explained its various statements and actions that are often inconsequentially baseless, ignorant and even tend to get lost, like crazy lunatics.

On May, 26 to July 29, 2005, the Indonesian Ulema Council (MUI) at its 7th Mu'tamar Nasional (مؤتمرالوطنية; National Conference) issued eleven non-legally-binding fatwas, where one of them is to forbid pluralism, secularism and liberalism in Indonesia. JIL responded by reasserting its position not to dissolve and stating the fatwas had restricted the freedom of speech in the democratic country. The JIL movement began to fade out with the departure of Ulil Abshar Abdalla to the United States to continue his education, which also dampened the overreactions from its opposing parties. In mid 2005, FPI attacked JIL headquarters due to the fatwa.

== Founders ==
- Luthfi Assyaukanie
- Ulil Abshar Abdalla
- Nong Darol Mahmada

== See also ==
- Liberalism and progressivism within Islam
