= Dawam Rahardjo =

Indonesian economist

Dawam Rahardjo (April 20, 1942 – May 30, 2018) was an Indonesian Muslim scholar and human rights activist. An economist by profession, Dawam was widely known for his uncompromising defence of minority groups and his advocacy for religious pluralism in Indonesian society. He was awarded the Yap Thiam Hien Award in 2013.

== Life and career ==
Born in Solo, Central Java on April 20, 1942, Dawam Rahardjo was one of the four Muslim students, along with Nurcholish Madjid, Ahmad Wahib and Djohan Effendi, who initiated “the Islamic rejuvenation” movement in the 1970s. Challenging the long held convictions propagated by the Islamic parties, they advocated for a more inclusive approach to Islam, which, they believed, was suitable for Indonesia as a diverse country. Besides being known as the editor in chief of the social economics journal Prisma, the professor of economics at the University of Muhammadiyah Malang has also been the Director of one of the largest national think tanks, namely the Institute for Economic and Social Research, Education and Information (LP3ES). Dawam Rahardjo also served as a member of the Honorary Board of the Indonesian Association of Muslim Intellectuals (ICMI) and founded and led the Institute for the Study of Religion and Philosophy (LSAF), and was involved in many other institutions.

== Death ==
On May 30, 2018, Dawam Rahardjo died at Cempaka Putih Hospital in Jakarta at the age of 76.

== See also ==
- Bahtiar Effendy
