= Firmanzah =

Indonesian academic (1976–2021)

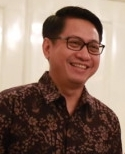

Rector of Paramadina University
- In office 6 January 2015 – 6 February 2021
- Preceded by: Anies Baswedan
- Succeeded by: Didik J. Rachbini

Personal details
- Born: 7 July 1976 Surabaya, East Java, Indonesia
- Died: 6 February 2021 (aged 44) Jakarta, Indonesia
- Education: University of Indonesia; University of Lille
- Profession: Economist, academic

Firmanzah (7 July 1976 – 6 February 2021) was an Indonesian academic.

== Career ==
At the age of 32 years he became dean of the Faculty of Economics, University of Indonesia, for the period 2009–2013. Firmanzah was elected as dean on 14 April 2008, making him the youngest dean of the University of Indonesia ever. He published more than 20 journal articles and several books.

Firmanzah also advised the Digital Divide Institute's "economic track" in which he explored the economic model for meaningful broadband for presentation to the Indonesian government.

In 2012, Firmanzah was appointed the special adviser for economic affairs to then-President Susilo Bambang Yudhoyono.

== Selected books ==
- Globalisasi: Sebuah Proses Dialektika Sistemi, Jakarta: Yayasan Bhakti Satria SAD, 2007, ISBN 978-979-16014-1-2
- Marketing Politik - Antara Pemahaman Dan Realitas, Jakarta: Yayasan Obor Indonesia, 2007, ISBN 978-979-461-639-0
- Mengelola Partai Politik: Komunikasi Dan Positioning Ideologi Politik Di Era Demokrasi, Jakarta: Yayasan Obor Indonesia, 2008, ISBN 978-979-461-680-2
