= Djohan Effendi =

Indonesian government minister

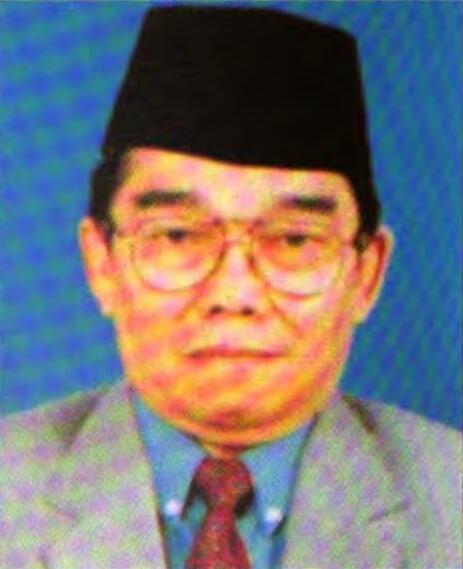
- Effendi in 1999

Secretary of State
- In office 29 May 2000 – 23 July 2001
- President: Abdurrahman Wahid
- Preceded by: Bondan Gunawan
- Succeeded by: Bambang Kesowo

Personal details
- Born: 1 October 1939 Kandangan, Dutch East Indies
- Died: 17 November 2017 (aged 78) Geelong, Australia
- Citizenship: Indonesian
- Education: Sunan Kalijaga State Islamic University, Deakin University (Ph.D.)

Djohan Effendi (1 October 1939 – 17 November 2017) was the Secretary of State of Indonesia, under President Abdurrahman Wahid from 2000 to 2001. He was an Ahmadi and belonged to the Lahore branch and was an ardent advocate for the Ahmadiyya movement. He was known for having been a prominent liberal thinker of Islam in Indonesia, more specifically based in Yogyakarta and a part of the Jogja-based liberal Islamic intellectual group known as the Limited Group led by Mukti Ali. He also served as chair of the International Centre for Religious Pluralism and voiced criticism toward the issuance of the fatwa by Majelis Ulama Indonesia targeting religious pluralism in 2005.

Effendi was considered to be a senior figure amongst Indonesian liberal Islamic activists, and was characterized by Budhy Munawar Rachman as a progressive Islamic scholar and as 'militant fighter for tolerance'. His name is included in the book 50 Tokoh Liberal di Indonesia (50 Liberal Figures in Indonesia) among the pioneers of the Indonesian liberal movement together with Nurcholish Madjid and Abdurrahman Wahid.

== Career ==
Previously Effendi was the Special Staff of the Secretary of State, as well as the author of President Soeharto's speech. He had written hundreds of speeches for President Soeharto, during his rule from 1978 to 1995. His career as a speechwriter of the President was terminated when he "recklessly" accompanied Abdurrahman Wahid's controversial visit to Israel in 1994. The visit was strongly opposed by some Islamic groups, and then state secretary Moerdiono also expressed his regret regarding the visit.

== Views ==
In Djohan's opinion, Ahmadis held the same right to practice their beliefs in Indonesia, and Indonesia under the Pancasila doctrine needs to ensure the complete religious pluralism, which he considers substantiated by the Medina Charter established by the Islamic prophet Muhammad, and the Qur'anic notion of kalimatun sawa′, meaning 'common word'. He also believed in the importance of the preservation of religion, grounded by the principles of maqasid al-shari'a advocated by al-Shatibi, and that relativism or syncretism need to be accommodated.
