= Harun Nasution =

Indonesian Islamic scholar

- Born: September 23, 1919; North Sumatera, Dutch East Indies
- Died: September 18, 1998 (aged 78); Jakarta, Indonesia
- Citizenship: Indonesia
- Occupations: Scholar; philosopher; rector

Education
- Education: Al-Azhar University (attended); American University of Cairo (BS); McGill University (MSSc, PhD)

Philosophical work
- Era: Contemporary Islamic philosophy: Modern philosophy; 20th-century philosophy
- Institutions: McGill University; UIN Syarif Hidayatullah
- Main interests: Islamic Modernism, Mu'tazilism

Harun Nasution (September 23, 1919 – September 18, 1998) was an Indonesian Islamic scholar and philosopher whose works and thoughts are part of Islamic thought which prioritizes rationalism, scientific and humanism principles. He was known for his advocacy and support of Mu'tazilite thought, which he saw as a potential solution to the multidimensional decline of many countries in the Muslim world. He is also known for reforming the education system at Islamic universities in Indonesia.

== Biography ==
Harun Nasution was born on September 19, 1919, in North Sumatra, Dutch East Indies. He was born from a family background of traditional Sunni scholars and traders. His father had been a traditional religious scholar, who despite his own immersion in Arabic and Islamic culture sent his son to a Dutch primary school. Nasution's did, however, attend an Islamic secondary school, although one that taught secular as well as religious subjects. Then he spent most of his youth outside Indonesia, living in Saudi Arabia and Egypt before moving to Canada.

He was initially sent by his father to study Islam in Mecca, Saudi Arabia. When he arrived in the 1930s, Harun saw the bitter reality of Mecca as one of the centers of Islam. He came at a time of severe poverty and backwardness for the people there before the Saudi oil boom occurred. After an unhappy period of further study in Mecca, he went to Egypt, where he attended lectures at al-Azhar University in Cairo. Just like during his time in Mecca, during his time at al-Azhar he also did not fit into the teaching model there which emphasized teaching through rigid traditional memorization. He finally moved to American University in Cairo and succeeded in obtaining his bachelor's degree.

In 1962 he began studying at the Institute of Islamic Studies at McGill University in Montreal. His doctoral studies were on the theology of Muhammad Abduh, focusing on the extent to which Abduh had been influenced by Mu'tazila teachings. Harun Nasution completed his PhD in 1969 and then returned to Indonesia, where he took the position as rector at UIN Syarif Hidayatullah in Jakarta.

== Philosophy and thought ==
Harun Nasution considers that the technological and economic decline of the Muslim world was partly due to its embrace of the Ash'arite school of theology, which he regarded as fatalistic. He was particularly hostile to the occasionalism that had become dominant in other common Islamic thoughts, stating that its rejection of the existence of secondary (created) and scientific law causes hindered scientific inquiry.

Nasution's solution was to defend a revival of the Mu'tazila view, which was (and still is) widely regarded by Muslims as a heresy. What Nasution admired in Mu'tazila thought was its emphasis on human reason without having to deny religious principles. In the basic teachings of the Mu'tazila, he writes,

It is possible to discern a form of rationalism, but not a rationalism that opposes religion or rejects the absolute truth of revelation... It is also possible to discern a form of naturalism, but not an atheistic naturalism that denies the existence and greatness of God... There is also human freedom and dynamism, but not absolute freedom from the design established by God... The doctrines of dynamism, human freedom and accountability, rationalism and naturalism taught by the Mu'tazila contributed significantly to the development of philosophy and the religious and secular sciences during the Classical Period of Islamic civilization.

== Legacy and impact ==
Nasution's influence on his fellow Indonesia thinkers is significant. His fellow Indonesian thinker Nurcholish Madjid argues that Nasution was an important influence in the development of modern Indonesian religious thought, particularly through his influence on students at IAIN. He is less known outside that country but he forms part of a significant movement that includes other "modernist" thinkers such as Mohammed Arkoun and Nasr Hamid Abu Zayd.

== Bibliography ==
=== Dissertations ===
- Nasution, Harun (1965). The Islamic State in Indonesia: The Rise of the Ideology, the Movement for its Creation and the Theory of the Masjumi (Master's). Montreal: McGill University.
- Nasution, Harun (1969). The Place of Reason in 'Abduh's Theology: Its Impact on his Theological System and Views (PhD). Montreal: McGill University.

=== Books ===
- Islam ditinjau dari berbagai aspeknya (Islam is viewed from various aspects) (Indonesia University Press, 1985);
- Teologi Islam: Aliran-aliran sejarah analisa perbandingan (Islamic Theology: historical schools of comparative analysis) (Indonesia University Press, 1986);
- Akal dan wahyu dalam Islam (Reason and revelation in Islam) (Indonesia University Press, 1986);
- Filsafat Agama (The Philosophy of Religion) (Jakarta: Bulan Bintang, 1991);
- Islam Rasional: Gagasan dan Pemikiran (Rational Islam: Ideas and Thoughts) (Mizan, 1995);
- Pembaharuan dalam Islam: Sejarah pemikiran dan gerakan (Renewal in Islam: A history of thought and movement) (Jakarta: Bulan Bintang, 1996).

=== Edited ===
- Nasution, Harun; et al., eds. (1992). Ensiklopedi Islam Indonesia [Encyclopedia of Indonesian Islam] (in Indonesian). Complited by team of the IAIN Syarif Hidayatullah. Jakarta: Djambatan. ISBN 979-428-134-4.
