= Komaruddin Hidayat =

Indonesian academic and intellectual

Prof Dr. Komaruddin Hidayat
- Prof Dr Komaruddin Hidayat's Photo

9th Rector of Jakarta Islamic State University
- In office 2006–2015
- Preceded by: Prof. Dr. Azyumardi Azra
- Succeeded by: Prof. Dr. Dede Rosyada, MA

Personal details
- Born: October 18, 1953 (age 72) Magelang, Indonesia
- Occupation: Rector of Jakarta Islamic State University

Komaruddin Hidayat (born October 18, 1953) is an Indonesian academic and intellectual. He has been rector of Syarif Hidayatullah State Islamic University Jakarta since 2006. His intellectual ability was demonstrated at several study and research institutions. Apart from his academic work, he was also a columnist in the mass media.

== Career ==
Komar was born in Magelang, Central Java, and has been close to the Islamic world since childhood, particularly the "pesantren" (Islamic boarding schools). He graduated from a modern boarding school in Pabelan (Magelang) in 1969 and the Pesantren al-Iman (Muntilan) in 1971. He then earned a BA in Islamic Education (1977) and a doctorate in the same area at IAIN Jakarta (the old UIN Jakarta) in 1981.

Komar continued his doctoral studies abroad. He received a doctorate in Western Philosophy at Middle East Technical University (Ankara, Turkey) in 1990.

Komar became a professor at the Graduate Faculty of IAIN Jakarta in 1990, a lecturer with the Graduate Faculty of the University of Indonesia in 1992, and a professor at the School of Philosophy (STF) Driyarkara in since 1993. On October 17, 2006, in a senate meeting chaired by Azyumardi Azra in the main auditorium of UIN Jakarta, Komar was elected rector of the university. He won the electoral votes of two other candidates, Prof. Dr. Masykuri Abdillah and Prof. Dr. Suwito.

Komar is a columnist in the mass media such as Kompas and Seputar Indonesia and Republika. He has sat on the Editorial Board of the magazine Ulumul Qur'an since 1991, the Editorial Board of Studia Islamika since 1994, and the Board of Editors of the Encyclopedia of the Islamic World. He is also Director of the Centre for Contemporary Islamic Development Studies (Pusat Kajian Pengembangan Islam Kontemporer), UIN Jakarta (since 1995). Since 1990 he has been a researcher with the Endowments Paramadina Foundation (Yayasan Wakaf Paramadina), Jakarta.

== Biography ==
Komar was born in a poor family in Muntilan. [4] Although the circumstances were not favorable, he had a strong motivation to achieve the best education. The things he was motivated by included the sad condition of his hometown, the death of his mother in childhood, [4] the influence of his grandmother, Qomariyah, and the presence of Kiai Hamam Ja'far and the boarding conditions that became the social background where he grew into an adult. [4]

Komar's grandmother is a wise man. It replaced the role of mothers who have left him since childhood. [4] Apart from admiration of his grandmother, Komar also got a boost of motivation from scholars in Pesantren Pabelan Ja'far Hamam, Magelang. Komar rate, Hamam Kiai figure that has been regarded as the father figure is like Moses. [4] That is, the figure of a leader, role model, and giving instructions that are always tough to conquer inequality and poverty. [4]

Kiai Hamam Komar teaches that human beings have a right to independence, to live. [4] Kiai Hamam showed high spirit and work ethic demonstrated when the Prophet migrated. [4] Komar also got the message that the principle of life must be like water. If Just remember, it will be a source of disease, while if it flows, it will be clean. [4]

Thanks to these motivations, Komar traveled to Jakarta at the age of 18 years so that eventually some of the achievements he won, among others, had opportunity to study abroad and became rector of the university. [4] He also has traveled to 30 countries within the framework of seminars and comparative studies to the problem cultural and religious development with universities and NGOs. [3]

== Complete biography ==
=== Position ===
- Rector of UIN Syarif Hidayatullah Jakarta, 2006–2010
- Chairman of the Supervisory Committee for 2004 Election

=== Education ===
- Ponpes Pabelan, Magelang (1969)
- Bachelor Ushuludin Faculty of IAIN Jakarta (UIN Syarif Hidayatullah Jakarta (1981)
- IMaster Philosophy and PhD in Middle East Affairs Technical University, Ankara, Turkey (1995)
- Post Doctorate Research Programs in Harfort Seminary, Connecticut, United States, for one semester (1997)
- International Visitor Program (IVP) to the U.S. (2002)

=== Work experiences ===
- Professor of Philosophy of Religion, UIN Syarif Hidayatullah Jakarta (since 2001)
- Paramadina Foundation Executive Director (1996–2000)
- Associate Trainer / Consultant in the field of HRD in Vita Colsultant Niaga (since 1999)
- Permanent Lecturer Institute of Bankers of Indonesia (since 2000)
- Lecturer Graduate University of Gadjah Mada University (since 2003)
- Advisory Board Member of Common Ground Indonesia (since 2001)
- Chairman of the Central Election Supervisory Committee (2003–2004)
- Chairman of Indonesia Procurement Watch (since 2002)
- Executive Director of Education Madania (sejakn 2001)
- Establishments Education Advisory Council (since 2004)
- Director of Graduate UIN Syarif Hidayatullah Jakarta (since 2005)
- Member of National Education Standards Agency Republic (since 2005)
- Chairman of the Election Supervisory Committee, 2004
- Rector of UIN Syarif Hidayatullah Jakarta, 2006–2010

=== Books ===
- Understanding the Language of Religion (1996)
- The Future of Religion (1995)
- Tragedy of King Midas (1998)
- God So Close (2000)
- Revelation of Heaven, Revelation on Earth (2002)
- Interpreting the Will of God (2003)
- Psychology of Death (2005)
