= Ayang Utriza Yakin =

Indonesian academic (born 1978)

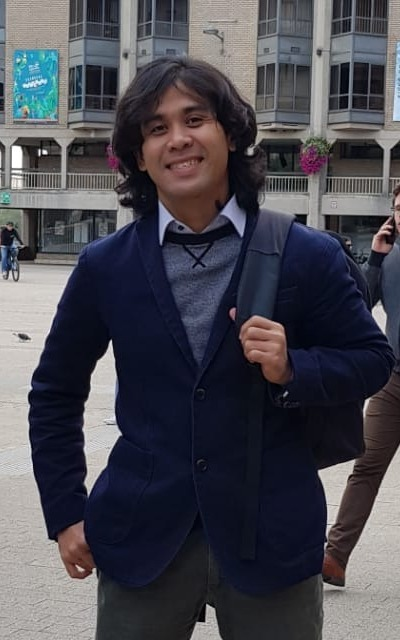
- Ayang Utriza Yakin, in 2019, in front of the Faculty of Theology, UCLuvain, Belgium.
- Born: June 1, 1978 (age 48); Jakarta
- Education: IAIN Syarif Hidayatullah Jakarta; Ecole des Hautes Etudes en Sciences Sociales (EHESS) Paris
- Awards: Le Prix Mahar Schutzenberger Paris
- Scientific career
- Thesis: Undhang-Undhang Banten: Etudes philologiques et historiques de la compilation des lois du Sultanat de Banten aux 17e et 18e siècles (2013)
- Doctoral advisor: Prof. Dr. Claude Guillot; Prof. Dr. Edwin P. Wieringa

Ayang Utriza Yakin is an Indonesian-born scholar of Islamic Studies based in Belgium. He is a research associate at Université catholique de Louvain.

He graduated with a BA in Islamic law from the Faculty of Sharia and Law of the Syarif Hidayatullah State Islamic University Jakarta in Jakarta (1996-2001) and studied Islamic law at the University of al-Azhar, Cairo (2001-2002). Yakin obtained an MA (2003-2005) and PhD (2008-2013) in History and Philology from the Ecole des Hautes Etudes en Sciences Sociales (EHESS), Paris. During the period of 2005-7 he also returned to Indonesia and was a lecturer at UIN Jakarta.

Yakin was a visiting fellow and postdoctoral researcher at the Oxford Centre for Islamic Studies (OXCIS) at the University of Oxford (in 2012), at the Islamic Legal Studies Program (ILSP) of Harvard Law School, the University of Harvard (in 2013), at the Asia Leadership Fellow Program (ALFP), Tokyo, Japan (2016), and at the Chair of Law and Religion of the research institute of “Religions, Spiritualities, Cultures, Societies” (RSCS), at the Université catholique de Louvain (UCLouvain), Belgium (2016 to 2019) and a visiting professor at Ghent University, and researcher at Sciences Po.

Since 2021, he is a research associate at the Chair of Law and Religion at the RSCS institute at UCLouvain), Belgium, and postdoctoral researcher at Sciences Po Bordeaux, France, working on the ANR-funded project ‘Equality and Law in Personal Status’.

== Selected publications ==
- Sejarah hukum Islam Nusantara abad XIV-XIX M (in Indonesian, Kencana, 2016)
- Islam moderat dan isu-isu kontemporer : demokrasi, pluralisme, kebebasan beragama, non Muslim, poligami, dan jihad (in Indonesian, Kencana, 2016)
- Rethinking Halal: Genealogy, Current Trends, and New Interpretations (in English, Brill, 2021)
- Hidup dalam Doa (in Indonesian, Bentang Pustaka, 2022)
- Islamic Divorce in the Twenty-First Century, A Global Perspective (in English, Rutgers University Press, 2022)
- Islam Praksis; Keberislaman yang Aqli, Naqli, dan Tarikhi (in Indonesian, IRCISOD, 2022)
- Bahkan Tuhan pun Tak Tega Jika Kita Menderita (in Indonesian, Bentang Pustaka, 2022)
- Shame, Modesty, and Honor in Islam (in English, Bloomsbury, 2024)
- Histoire, société et études islamiques au 21e siècle (in French & English, De Gruyter, 2024)
