= International Center for Islam and Pluralism =

Islamic organization based in South Tangerang, Banten, Indonesia

Indonesian Center for Islam and Pluralism (ICIP)
- Abbreviation: ICIP
- Formation: 2003
- Headquarters: Tangerang Selatan, Banten, Indonesia
- Executive Director: M. Syafi'i Anwar
- Website: www.icip.or.id

The Indonesian Center for Islam and Pluralism (ICIP)—previously International Center for Islam and Pluralism—is an Islamic NGO in Indonesia that was founded in 2003. Based in South Tangerang near Jakarta, it states that it aims to disseminate moderate and progressive Islamic views in Indonesia and internationally.

== Background ==
Indonesia is a Muslim-majority country, with Muslims constituting around 85% of the population. However, despite this there are significant minority religions in the country as well as a great deal of diversity in the expression of Islam between different groups of Muslims. This environment has meant that Indonesian Islam has traditionally been open, tolerant and moderate in character.

In the past decade, however newer, more conservative and radical forms of Islam have begun to emerge in Indonesia and other Muslim countries. These forms of Islam are more characterized by an exclusive mindset which is intolerant of difference either amongst the Indonesian community in general or the Islamic community more specifically. These groups, whole small in number have garnered international media attention in recent years, particularly after September 11 attacks. The emergence of these groups has threatened Indonesia's traditional image as an open, tolerant and moderate Muslim community.

In response to this, the Indonesian Center for Islam and Pluralism (ICIP) was established in 2003 as an organization to link together various progressive-moderate Islamic activists in Indonesia and the Asian region. These activists are dedicated to the ideals of pluralism which promote respect for difference, whether this is between different religious, ethnic or social groups or between different streams of thought within a particular religions. It is hoped that through establishing this network between progressive moderate activists they will be able to more effectively counter existing radical-conservative networks in Indonesia and the region.

== Objective ==
ICIP aims to build a network of Islamic Non-Governmental Organizations (NGOs) and progressive-moderate Muslim activists and intellectuals in South-East Asia and eventually around the globe.
