= Høve =

Village in Zealand, Denmark

Coordinates: 55.835°N 11.487°E

Høve is a village in northwest Zealand with fewer than 200 inhabitants (2011). Høve is located near Sejerø Bay, five kilometers north of Asnæs, 17 kilometers southwest of Nykøbing Sjælland, and 25 kilometers northwest of Holbæk. The village is part of Odsherred Municipality and is in Asnæs Parish.

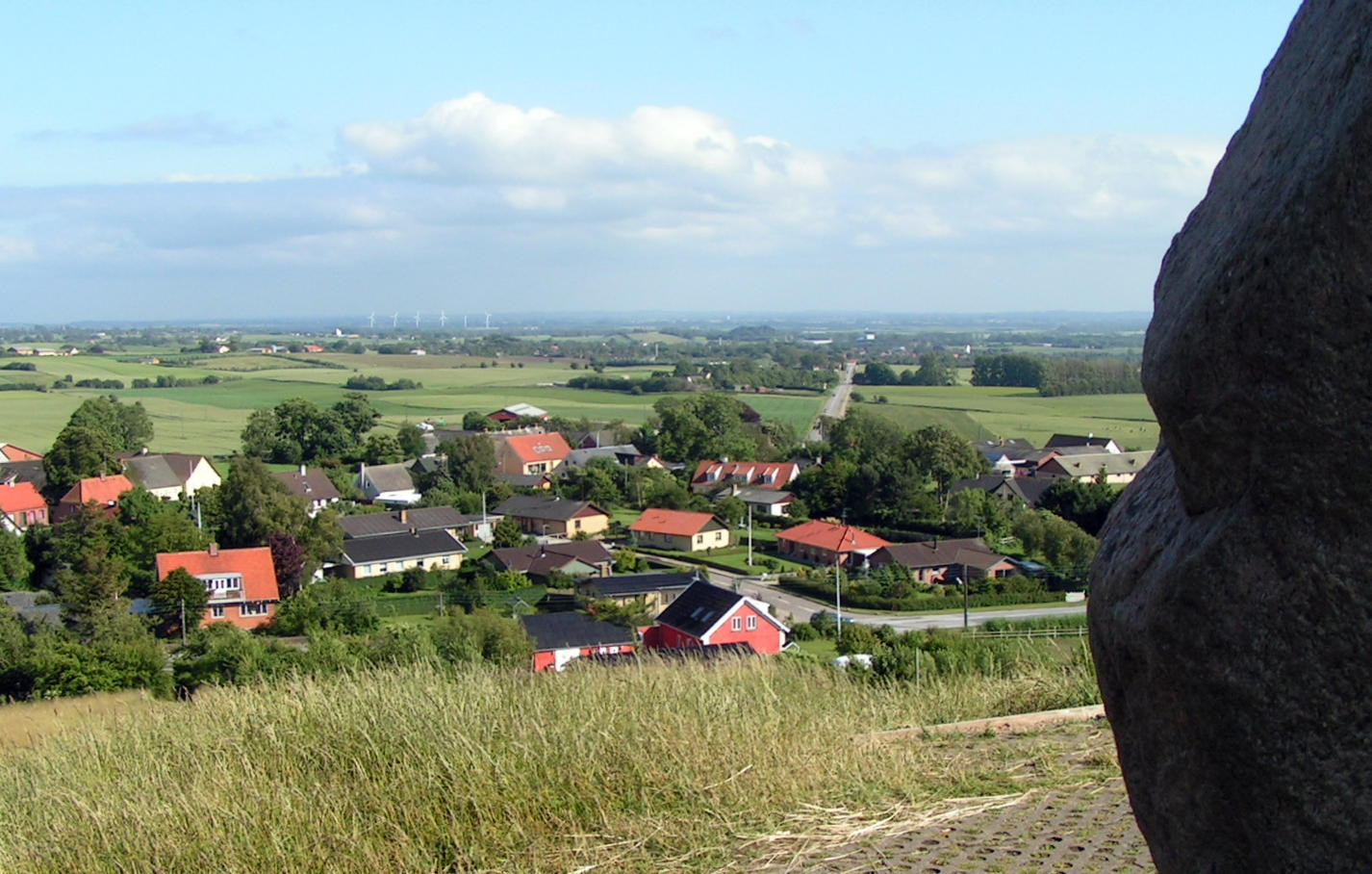
View from Esterhøj over Høve and Lammefjorden

== Høve and the surrounding nature ==
Høve is where the road from Asnæs meets the main road stretching from Nykøbing to Slagelse. Next to Høve at 89 meters above sea level is Esterhøj, an ancient burial mound, which has views over Sejerø Bay and much of Lammefjorden. At the top of Esterhøj is a memorial stone commemorating the Schleswig Plebiscites in 1920. In earlier times, Høve, like many other villages, had an active commercial life – there was a coop, a butcher, a baker, a painter, and even a little museum. Although these are gone, one can still buy specialty products such as stoves, curtains, and dried flowers.

About a kilometer north of Høve is Høve beach. Earlier, the area down around Sejerø Bay was grasslands, where animals went to graze, but now the beach is surrounded by woods and summerhouses. Høve forest is quite small, but has a variety of conifers that were originally planted to prevent sand drifting, and beech trees on the moraine hills. The beach itself is popular swimming location. In the eastern end of the forest is a little campsite, while in the northern end, one can visit a summer restaurant.

== Culture ==
Høve Friskole lies in the village's southern outskirts, overlooking Sejerø Bay. The school was established in 1874 by a group of parents in Høve and the surrounding region, and was inspired by the grundtvig-koldske school of thought. There are approximately 130 students at the school, which lends itself as a natural meeting place. The school's sports hall frequently doubles as a party room.

The grave site of Ole Olsen, the creator of Nordisk Film, can be found a bit outside of Høve, about 100 meters west of Esterhøj. The grave is perhaps inspired by the nearby Esterhøj, as it's shaped like an ancient burial mound. However, the grave's young age is revealed, as the door on the south side provides access to a peek inside the burial chamber. Through a small window, one can glimpse the urns that hold the remains of the famous filmmaker and his wife. The grave site is most easily accessed if one parks one's bike or car at the foot of Esterhøj and takes a short journey on foot.
