= Dede Rosyada =

Muslim academic

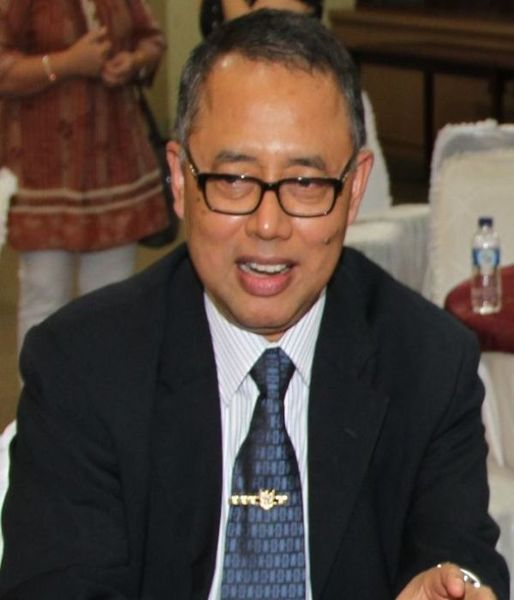

10th Rector of Syarif Hidayatullah State Islamic University Jakarta
- In office 2015–2019
- Preceded by: Komaruddin Hidayat

Personal details
- Born: 5 October 1957 Ciamis, Indonesia
- Occupation: Rector of UIN Syarif Hidayatullah Jakarta
- Website: dederosyada.lec.uinjkt.ac.id

Dede Rosyada (born 5 October 1957) is a Muslim academic and intellectual from Indonesia. He has been rector of UIN Syarif Hidayatullah Jakarta since 2015.

== Position ==
- Rector, UIN Syarif Hidayatullah Jakarta, 2015–2019
- Director of Islamic Higher Education, Ministry of Religious Affairs (Indonesia), 2011–2014
- Acting Rector, IAIN Sulthan Thaha Saefudin Jambi, 2011

== Education ==
- Bachelor of Islamic Education, UIN Syarif Hidayatullah Jakarta
- Master of Islamic Studies, UIN Syarif Hidayatullah Jakarta
- Doctor of Islamic Studies, UIN Syarif Hidayatullah Jakarta
- Post Doctoral Programme, McGill University
- Visiting Scholar, Ohio University

== Books ==
- Paradigma Pendidikan Demokratis, Sebuah Model Pelibatan Masyarakat dalam Pengelolaan Sekolah (Prenada Media : 2004)
- Pendidikan Kewargaan, Demokrasi, HAM dan Civil Society (IAIN Press : 2001) dan (Prenada Media : 2003)
- Metode kajian Hukum Dewan Hisbah PERSIS (Logos Wacana Ilmu : 1999)
- Sejarah dan Ilmu al-Qur'an (Dede Rosyada dan tim, Pustaka Firdaus : 1999)
- Ilmu Ushul Fiqh (Departemen Agama RI : 1998)
- Teguh Beriman motto daerah Khusus Ibukota, Jakarta (Pemerintah Daerah Khusus Ibukota, Jakarta : 1997)
- Dirasah Islamiyah (KODI pemerintah Daerah Khusus Ibukota, Jakarta : 1997)
- Pendidikan Pengamalan Ibadah (Departemen Agama RI : 1996)
- Gerakan Dissiplin Nasional dalam perspektif Islam (Kantor Tramtib, Pemda DKI, Jakarta : 1996)
- Pedoman Zakat untuk masyarakat Muslim Jakarta (Badan Amil Zakat, Infaq dan Shadaqah, Pemda DKI : 1995)
- Ilmu Agama Islam II (Binbaga Islam Departemen Agama RI : 1995)
- Ilmu Agama Islam I (Binbaga Islam Departemen Agama RI : 1994)
- Ilmu-Ilmu al-Qur'an (LBIQ DKI Jakarta : 1993)
- Tema-Tema Pokok al-Qur'an (LBIQ KI Jakarta : 1993)
- Hukum Islam dan Pranata Sosial (PT Rajawali : 1992)
