= M. Syafi'i Anwar =

Indonesian historian

M. Syafi'i Anwar is an Indonesian historian and journalist. He is a senior research fellow at the Ash Center for Democratic Governance and Innovation as well as the executive director of the International Center For Islam and Pluralism.

Anwar was instrumental to the founding of the Indonesian Association of Muslim Intellectuals, having participation in the 1990 meeting with B. J. Habibie that led to the organization's establishment. Anwar has defended the IAMI as a middle-class organization, stating that the Indonesian middle-class of the 1980s and 1990s was culturally self-confident and lacked the inferiority complex toward the modern world, supported by non-Muslims and Javanists, that had been imprinted on Muslims during the colonial era.
