= Azyumardi Azra =

Indonesian historian (1955–2022)

Azyumardi Azra CBE
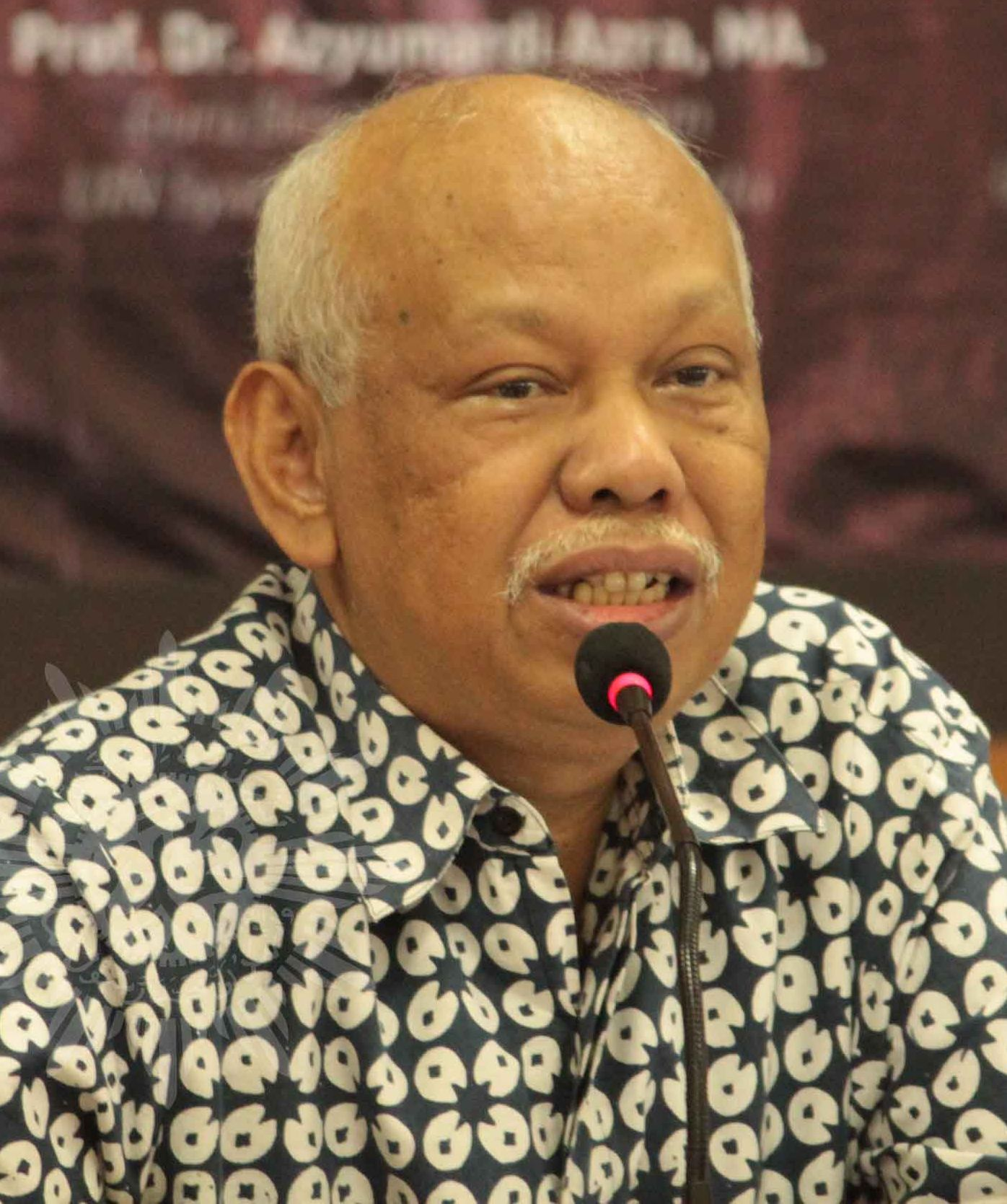

8th Rector of Syarif Hidayatullah State Islamic University Jakarta
- In office 1998–2006
- Preceded by: Quraish Shihab
- Succeeded by: Komaruddin Hidayat

Personal details
- Born: 4 March 1955 Padang Pariaman, West Sumatra, Indonesia
- Died: 18 September 2022 (aged 67) Selangor, Malaysia
- Spouse: Ipah Farihah
- Education: Syarif Hidayatullah State Islamic University Jakarta; Columbia University
- Website: azyumardiazra.lec.uinjkt.ac.id (archived July 17, 2023)

Azyumardi Azra CBE (4 March 1955 – 18 September 2022) was an Indonesian public intellectual, Muslim scholar and Rector of Syarif Hidayatullah State Islamic University Jakarta. He graduated from Department of History, Columbia University in 1992 with a PhD. He was known as a prolific books writer; member of advisory board of a number of international organizations such as UN Democracy Fund (UNDEF), International Institute for Democracy and Electoral Assistance (International IDEA). After serving as Rector at Syarif Hidayatullah State Islamic University Jakarta, he was the Director of Graduate School.

In 2010, he received the title of Commander of the Order of the British Empire, an honorary order from the United Kingdom. Azra died on 18 September 2022 due to a heart attack, he was 67 year old.

== Bibliography ==
- Jaringan Ulama (1994)
- Pergolakan Politik Islam (1996)
- Islam Reformis (1999)
- Konteks Berteologi di Indonesia (1999)
- Pendidikan Islam : Tradisi dan Modernisasi Menuju Milenium Baru (1999)
- Esei-Esei Pendidikan Islam, dan Cendikiawan Muslim (1999)
- Renaisans Islam di Asia Tenggara (1999)
- Islam Substantif (2000)
- Historiografi Islam Kontemporer (2002)
- Paradigma Baru Pendidikan Nasional (2002)
- Reposisi Hubungan Agama dan Negara (2002)
- Menggapai Solidaritas (2002)
- Konflik Baru Antar Peradaban (2003)
- Islam Nusantara, Jaringan Global dan Lokal (2003)
- Surau, Pendidikan Islam Tradisional Dalam Transisi dan Modernisasi (2003)
- Shari'a and Politics (2004)
- The Origins of Islamic Reformism in Southeast Asia: Networks of Malay-Indonesian and Middle Eastern 'Ulama' in the Seventeenth and Eighteenth Centuries (2004)
- Islam in the Indonesian World: An Account of Institutional Formation (2006)
- Indonesia, Islam, and Democracy: Dynamics in a Global Context (2006)
- Islam Beyond Conflict: Indonesian Islam and Western Political Theory (2008)
- Varieties of Religious Authority: Changes and Challenges in 20th Century Indonesian Islam (2010)

== Honours ==
Ribbon	Distinction	Country	Date	Reference
	Star of Mahaputera, 3rd Class (Indonesian: Bintang Mahaputera Utama)	Indonesia	9 August 2005	
	Commander of The Most Excellent Order of the British Empire (CBE)	United Kingdom	2010	
ribbon bar	Order of the Rising Sun: Gold and Silver Star	Japan	2017	
