= Hedayatollah Hatami =

Iranian man allegedly executed in 1988

- Persian: هدایت الله حاتمی
- Born: c. 1914; Tehran, Sublime State of Persia
- Died: September 1988 (aged 74); Iran
- Cause of death: Execution by hanging
- Education: Military College
- Occupation: Teacher

Hedayatollah Hatami (c. 1914 - September 1988) was an Iranian man who was allegedly hanged during the 1988 executions of Iranian political prisoners. He was one of at 1,000 people identified in a United Nations Human Rights Commission Special Representative's Report entitled "Names and Particulars of Persons Allegedly Executed by the Islamic Republic of Iran from July–December 1988", published on January 26, 1989. Although information about Hatami's arrest and trial was never released, the U.N. report noted that political prisoners of all types were included in the executions: "Most of the alleged victims were members of the Mojahedin. However, members of the Tudeh Party, People's Fedaiyan Organization, Rahe Kargar, and Komala Organization and 11 mollahs were also said to be among the alleged victims." Hatami had been an active member of the Tudeh Party.

== Life and work ==
Hatami was born in Tehran. After graduating from the Military College, he joined the Tudeh Party in 1942. He taught in the Military College for three years.

In 1945, a new government was established in Azerbaijan. This province was occupied by the Red Army, which declared it an independent state (to be supported by the Soviet Union). In response, Hatami traveled to Tabriz, Azerbaijan, and played a significant role in the creation of an army for the Democrat Party. After the Democrat Party was defeated, he escaped the country and went to the Soviet Union. From 1947 to 1974, he was a member of the Science Academy for the Socialist Republic of Azerbaijan. After the Iranian Revolution, he returned to Iran and continued his writings as a member of the Central Committee of the Tudeh Party of Iran.

The Tudeh Party had been created in 1941. The Tudeh's ideology was Marxist–Leninist, and it supported policies of the former Soviet Union. The Party had played a major role in Iran's political scene until it was banned for the second time following the August 19, 1953 coup. After the 1979 Revolution, the Tudeh Party declared Ayatollah Khomeini and the Islamic Republic regime revolutionaries and anti-imperialists, and actively supported the new government. Although the Party never opposed the Islamic Republic, it became the target of government attacks in 1982, and most of the Party's leaders and members were imprisoned.

== Arrest and detention ==
The circumstances of Hatami's arrest and detention are not known.

== Trial ==
According to the book The Tudeh Martyrs, Mr. Hatami was tried and condemned to life imprisonment. No information about the trial, or the retrials that led to the executions, has become available.

The relatives of the political prisoners executed in 1988 refute the legality of the judicial process that resulted in thousands of executions throughout Iran. In an open letter to then-Minister of Justice Dr. Habibi in 1988, they argued that the official secrecy surrounding these executions was proof of their illegality. They noted that an overwhelming majority of these prisoners had been tried and sentenced to prison terms, which they either were serving or had completed when they were retried and sentenced to death.

== Charges ==
No charge was ever levelled publicly against Hatami. In their letters to the Minister of Justice in 1988, and to the U.N. Special Rapporteur visiting Iran in February 2003, the families of the victims stated that authorities' accusations against the prisoners had included being "counter-revolutionary, anti-religion, and anti-Islam," as well as being "associated with military action or with various [opposition] groups based near the borders."

An edict by Ayatollah Khomeini - reproduced in the memoirs of Ayatollah Montazeri, his designated successor - corroborated these claims. In this edict, Ayatollah Khomeini referred to the members of the People's Mujahedin of Iran (PMOI) as "hypocrites" who do not believe in Islam and "wage war against God." He also decreed that prisoners who still approved of the PMOI's positions were also "waging war against God" and should be sentenced to death.

== Evidence of guilt ==
The report of his execution contains no evidence provided against Hatami.

== Defence ==
In their open letter, the families of the prisoners stated that the defendants were not given the opportunity to defend themselves in court. Against the assertion that prisoners were associated with guerrillas operating near the borders, the families submitted the isolation of their relatives from the outside during their detention: "Our children lived in most difficult conditions. Visits were limited to 10 minutes behind a glass divider through a telephone every two weeks. We witnessed, over the past seven years, that they were denied access to anything that would have allowed them to establish contacts outside their prisons' walls." Under such conditions, the families argued, it would be impossible for these prisoners to engage with political groups outside Iran, as the authorities claimed.

== Death ==
No specific information is available about Hatami's death sentence. He was hanged in September 1988, at age 74.
