= Ichtiar Baru van Hoeve =

Company of Indonesia

Ichtiar Baru van Hoeve is an Indonesian publisher of encyclopedia and reference books.

Originally named Penerbit Van Hoeve Bandung, it was already operating in the 1930s. It closed on 1957 when Indonesia nationalized many foreign companies, but was re-established in ca. 1974 using the name PT Ichtiar Baru Van Hoeve and was headquartered in Jakarta. One of its first publications in this new period was Ensiklopedi Indonesia (1980) with Hassan Shadily as editor-in-chief. Ensiklopedi Indonesia was expanded from earlier book with similar name, Ensiklopedia Indonesia, by Todung Sutan Gunung Mulia and published by the original Van Hoeve in 1955.

== Publications ==
Ichtiar Baru van Hoeve has published ten encyclopaedias:

1. Ensiklopedi Indonesia (10 volumes)
2. Ensiklopedi Fauna (6 volumes)
3. Ensiklopedi Geografi (Encyclopedia of Geography; 6 vols and 1 atlas)
4. Ensiklopedi Islam (7 volumes)
5. Ensiklopedi Hukum Islam (Encyclopedia of Islamic Law; 5 volumes)
6. Ensiklopedi Populer Anak (Popular Children's Encyclopedia; 6 volumes)
7. Ensiklopedi Islam untuk Pelajar (Islamic Encyclopedia for Students; 6 volumes)
8. Ensiklopedi Tematis Dunia Islam (World Thematic Encyclopedia of Islam; 7 volumes)
9. Ensiklopedi Umum untuk Pelajar (General Encyclopedia for Students; 12 volumes)
10. Aku Tahu Islam, ensiklopedi untuk anak SD kelas 2–4 (I Know Islam, encyclopedia for kids grade 2-4; 20 volumes)

Ichtiar Baru van Hoeve has also published two law books:

1. Himpunan Peraturan Perundang-undangan RI menurut Sistem Engelbrecht (Legislation set RI according to Engelbrecht System)
2. Studi Notariat dan Serba-serbi Praktek Notaris (Study Lists Notary and Notary Practice)
