= Umar Lubis =

Indonesian actor

- Born: Umar Al Fattah Lubis; July 14, 1973 (age 53); Jakarta, Indonesia
- Occupations: Celebrity, Model
- Years active: 2006 - present
- Height: 165 cm (5 ft 5 in)
- Spouse: Ravelra Ruth Supit
- Children: 4
- Parent(s): Burhanuddin Umar Lubis; Nabilah Lubis
- Relatives: Ajun Perwira (co-brother-in-law); Amany Lubis (elder sister)

Umar Lubis (born July 14, 1973, in Jakarta) is an Indonesian actor and model. He is known for his numerous roles in soap operas. He always roles in SinemArt soap operas. Usually, he is always role as a father in soap operas. He is the son-in-law of Rae Sita. His name started to be known by the public when he played in the soap opera Intan. In that soap opera, he role as Dr. Frans, father of Lila who is role by Ingka Noverita.

== Personal life ==
Umar Lubis married Ravelra Ruth Supit (October 14, 1975) in 1996. From their marriage, they have four children, there are Nabil Raehan Lubis (January 1997), Ramzie Rif'at Lubis (July 7, 1998), Rania Rizqina Lubis (July 24, 2002), and Raafi Ali Lubis (April 2011).

== Filmography ==
=== Films ===
Year	Title	Role	Production
2010	Dalam Mihrab Cinta	Broto	SinemArt
2015	Air & Api	Sisi's father	Starvision Plus

=== Soap Operas ===
Year	Title	Role	Production
2002	Doa dan Anugerah	Rudi	Multivision Plus
2002	Permaisuri Hatiku	Anton	Multivision Plus
2004	Bule Masuk Kampung	Adam	Multivision Plus
2006	Bintang	Adam	SinemArt
2006	Cincin	—N/a	SinemArt
2006	Benci Bilang Cinta	Darian Subekti	SinemArt
2006	Rahasia Pelangi	Ferry	SinemArt
2006	Intan	Dr. Frans	SinemArt
2006	Pengantin Remaja	—N/a	SinemArt
2007	Candy	Ari	SinemArt
2007	Juwita Jadi Putri	Ferdi	SinemArt
2007	Cahaya	Rio	SinemArt
2008	Namaku Mentari	—N/a	SinemArt
2008	Lia	Yos	SinemArt
2009	Safa dan Marwah	Husein/Zainal & Boy	SinemArt
2010	Lagu Cinta Nirmala	Fuad	SinemArt
2010	Mertua dan Menantu	Imran	SinemArt
2011	Kasih dan Cinta	Widodo	SinemArt
2011	Binar Bening Berlian	Ananta	SinemArt
2011	Dewa	Bonar	SinemArt
2012	Yang Masih di Bawah Umur	—N/a	SinemArt
2013	Magic	Gito	SinemArt
2013	Jodohku	Haji Aji	SinemArt
2013	Putri Nomor 1	Pramono	SinemArt
2014	Kau yang Berasal dari Bintang	—N/a	SinemArt
2014	Aisyah Putri The Series: Jilbab In Love	Ridwan	SinemArt
2015 - 2017	Anak Jalanan	Wirawan	SinemArt
2016	Anugerah Cinta	Samsul	SinemArt
2017	Berkah Cinta	Lukman Hakim	SinemArt
2017	Anak Langit	Junaedi	SinemArt
2017	Mawar dan Melati	Brata	SinemArt
2017	Tuhan Beri Kami Cinta	Naryo	SinemArt
2018	Cinta Suci	(cameo)	SinemArt
2019	Topeng Kaca	Mahendra	SinemArt
2020–present	Dari Jendela SMP	Lukman Hariwidjaya	SinemArt
2021	Buku Harian Seorang Istri	Wawan (cameo)	SinemArt

=== TVM ===
- Kupilih Jalanku Sendiri (2017) as Akmal Fatoni
