= Hidayatullah (Islamic organization) =

Islamic organization based in Indonesia

- Formation: February 5, 1973; 53 years ago
- Founder: Abdullah Said
- Founded at: Balikpapan, East Kalimantan, Indonesia
- Headquarters: Jl. Cipinang Cempedak I/14, Jatinegara, East Jakarta, Jakarta, Indonesia
- Website: http://hidayatullah.or.id/

Hidayatullah is an Islamic mass organization based in Indonesia, founded in 1973. It is aimed at propagation of puritanical interpretation of Islam, and dawah (proselytization). The organization operates pesantren (Islamic boarding school), mass media, women's division, and coop.

== History ==
=== Origin ===
Hidayatullah was founded on 5 February 1973 (1 Muharram 1393 Hijriah), by Ustadz Abdullah Said in Balikpapan as a form of pesantren (Islamic school, most of whom are boarders). From a pesantren, Hidayatullah was developed further with many activities such as social, mission, education and economy programs and spread to many regions. As of 2003, this institution had networks in 200 cities, in every province in Indonesia. By the first national meeting on July 9–13, 2000 in Balikpapan, Hidayatullah changed its form to a mass organization and declared itself as an Islamic Struggle Movement.

== Organization ==
Its mission is to realize society based on Al-Qur'an that free from thoughts and attitude that allying Allah (syirik).

Hidayatullah leadership is built based on a method that follows priority scale from the most principle (ushul) until the non-principle (furu’iyyah). While the main agenda that becomes focus work is: streamlining of aqidah, leadership and organization matters (tajdid); awareness brighten (tilawatu ayatillah); soul purify (tazkiyatun-nufus); instruction and education (ta’limatul-kitab wal-hikmah) going to the birth of leadership and best ummah.

Hidayatullah was born when Muslims were awaiting the coming of a XV Hijriah century, believed to be the era of Islam resurrection. The main theme at that time was “Back to Qur'an and Sunnah.” Hidayatullah is a thought movement that tries to interpret “Back to Qur’an and Sunnah” more concretely, so, Al-Qur'an and Sunnah became a blueprint for Islam civilization development.

Hidayatullah claims themselves to be an Islamic Struggle Movement (Al-Harakah Al-Jihadiyah Al-Islamiyah) with dakwah (mission) and tarbiyah (education) as main programs.

=== Membership ===
As a mass organization, membership of Hidayatullah is inclusive, and is an institution for Moslems that want to realize their idealism to build Islamic society, refer to prophet method (manhaj nubuwwah). Hidayatullah is steadfast in its adherence to the Al Quran and Sunnah. Its obedience toward Allah and Muhammad is absolute; therefore all matters must be returned to Allah and Muhammad.

Hidayatullah opened its membership in January 2001 to all adult Muslims. B

Central Official Members consist of the Council of Sharia, the Council of Representatives (Syura) and the Central Executive Board. Sharia Council is the highest institute of organization, led by a chairman that also represents “imam” (leader) of Hidayatullah, called as General Leader. Council of Representatives represents observation institute for executive, this council consist of 25 members that are elected through national deliberation. General Leader ratifies Central Executive Board in national deliberation for 5 years duration.

Structures under Central Executive Board consist of Regional Executive Boards, Area Executive Boards (sub-province), Branch Executive Boards (district), and Subsection Executive Boards (sub-district). The chief of regional Executive Board downwards selected by deliberation in each level and have responsibility upwards and also to constituents.

Hidayatullah networks are supported by existence of 21 Regional Executive Boards and 194 Area Executive Boards. Of these, 51 are located in Java and 143 in outside of Java.

Its Chairman of Sharia Council is Abdurrahman Muhammad, while its Chairman of Syura is Abdul Qadir Jailani.

== Activities ==
Hidayatullah's main programs are dakwah (mission) and tarbiyah (education). Hidayatullah tries to put da’i as “missionaries of Islam” so that the profile of da’i is ones who have excellent and militant characteristic and also have potency to build a balance civilization between earthly and eternity.

=== Missionary and educational work ===
Since 1978, Hidayatullah have sent da’i around the country. Since 1998 this cadre of da’i education institute have yielded and sent its grads to various area especially east and middle Indonesia. Every year Hidayatullah sends at least 150 da’i to many regions in Indonesia with 50 among them are stratum one grads from cadre of da’i education institute. All Hidayatullah cadres are expected to go out preaching to the general public every Saturday.

Hidayatullah manages schools from kindergarten until college level. Hidayatullah education institute covers Kindergarten and Play Group, Elementary School or Madrasah Ibtidaiyah in almost all areas, Junior High School/Madrasah Tsanawiyah and Senior High School/Madrasah Aliyah at least in each region and 3 colleges in Surabaya, Balikpapan and Depok. Beside Religion College of Islam Lukman Al Hakim (STAIL) in Surabaya and Moslem Law Science College of Hidayatullah (STIS) in Balikpapan as education institute for da'i cadre, Hidayatullah is starting Management Science College in Depok that is expected can yield grads that able to manage the Hidayatullah charitable efforts including economic efforts.

Opening Hidayatullah's 2016 national conference, Riau Islands governor Nurdin Basirun welcomed the large scale and success of the organisation's many schools.

The Centre Education of Pious Child (Pusat Pendidikan Anak Shaleh - PPAS) is institution in the form of pesantren for orphans and poor children that place priority on growth of religious values through the reading of the Qur'an (tilawah), sanctifying of soul (tazkiyah), and studying (ta’limah). PPAS with its management have a multi-dimension characteristic for children; as substitute of parents, mini laboratory of life, and place to strengthen faith and enhance knowledge.

In education, its education institute includes kindergarten, play group, and Quran education centre.

=== Suara Hidayatullah Magazine ===
Suara Hidayatullah ("Voice of Hidayatullah") is one of business entity in Hidayatullah that is concentration in press. Initially, the magazine is only in the form of bulletin, masterpiece result of some student in pesantren Hidayatullah in Balikpapan. Considering what a strategic is dakwah through mass media, the bulletin continues to be developed.

Suara Hidayatullah contains about dakwah dynamics and problems, either in Indonesia and also world. In it there is interview popular figure, study of Al-Qur'an and Hadits, heroic story of struggle of da’i in various area all over the country, till the problem of family.

Its main office is in Surabaya.

=== Rural development ===
Inkophida is a cooperative created by Hidayatullah, founded in 1999 at Jakarta, and has achieve authentication from Minister of Cooperation and Empowerment of Small and Medium Industry dated 9 April 1999. Inkophida owns 9 co-operation centres in level of province and 142 primary co-operations in level of sub-province. Inkophida's vision is to build an ummah economy network.

Having been founded in East Kalimantan, it's involved in the development of the remove areas of the province. This concern was behind the sending, since early 1980s, of da’i (religious teachers or preachers) to the hinterland. Most of the da’i have since built their own pesantren in areas where they were posted –this in addition to the continued effort of the Hidayatullah to develop boarding schools in whatever regions where there are none.

The province of Papua is another focus of attention of the Hidayatullah. The same drive of the Hidayatullah preachers could be said for those posted in East Timor before the territory's independence from Indonesia.

Baitul Maal Hidayatullah (BMH) is an institute under Hidayatullah that have functions to manage funds of ummah's zakat, infaq, shadaqah and waqaf. As embodiment from society and government to Hidayatullah, Baitul Maal Hidayatullah (BMH) have achieved confirmation as a national institute organizer of religious obligatory through decree of Republic Indonesia Religion Minister No. 538 year 2001.

BMH organizes a fund property of ummah that entrusted to Hidayatullah to be channelled to empowerment of ummah, moving forward education institute and also social, moving forward mission of Islam, lessening the oppressed and weak. Now BMH have owned 30 representative offices and 144 partner networks.
