= Paramadina University =

Islamic university in Indonesia

- Universitas Paramadina
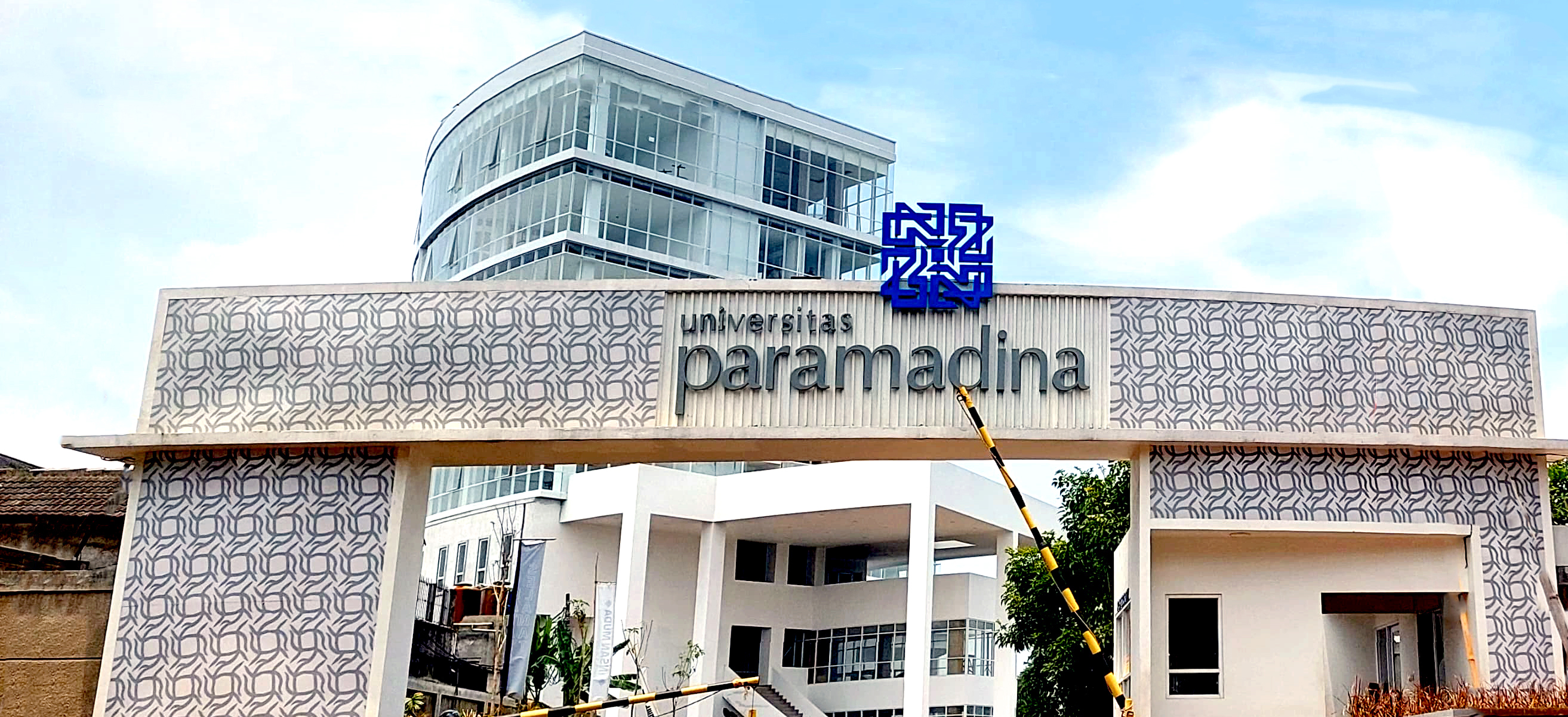
- Cipayung campus
- Established: 1998
- Founders: Nurcholish Madjid
- Rector: Didik Rachbini
- Website: paramadina.ac.id
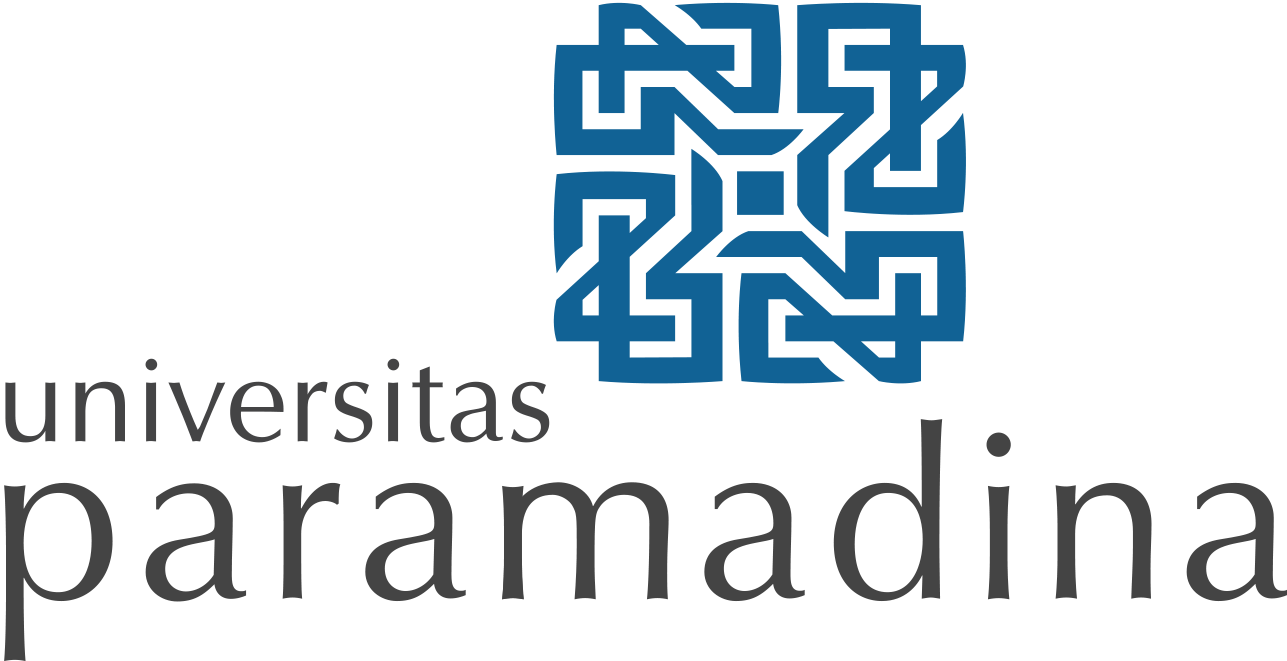

Paramadina University (Indonesian: Universitas Paramadina) is an Islamic university in Indonesia. It was established by Nurcholish Madjid in 1998. Paramadina University has three campuses on Java: Cipayung, Kuningan, and Cikarang. It has a particular emphasis on science and technology. In 2008 it introduced a mandatory anti-corruption course for all students.

== Rectors ==
- Nurcholish Madjid, 1998–2005
- Anies Baswedan, 2007–2015
- Firmanzah, 2015–2021
- Didik Rachbini, 2023–
