= Nurcholish Madjid =

Indonesian intellectual (1939–2005)

Nurcholish Madjid (March 17, 1939 – August 29, 2005), in Indonesia affectionately known as Cak Nur, was a prominent Indonesian Muslim intellectual. Early in his academic career, Nurcholish was a leader in various student organizations. He soon became well known as a proponent for modernization within Islam. Throughout his career he continued to argue that for Islam to be victorious in the global struggle of ideas, it needs to embrace the concepts of tolerance, democracy and pluralism.

== Biography ==
Born in Jombang, East Java, Madjid received his early education in religious institutions in Indonesia, so called pesantren. He later received his doctorate in Islamic Studies from the University of Chicago in the United States where he studied under the noted Pakistani-American scholar, Fazlur Rahman. In 2003 he participated in Indonesia's national elections as a candidate for the presidency. He served as Rector of Paramadina University in Jakarta from 1998 up until his death. Madjid was married and had two children.

In the 1970s, Cak Nur coined the slogan: 'Islam Yes, Islamic Party No', which became very popular. The slogan helped combat the view that it was sinful for Muslims to vote against Islamic parties. The two most successful Muslim parties in Indonesia's 2004 general elections, the moderate National Awakening and United Development Parties, received 10.6% and 8.1% of the vote, respectively.

== Publications ==
- “The Issue of Modernization among Muslims in Indonesia: A Participant’s Point of View”, in: Gloria Davies, ed. What is Modern in Indonesian Culture, Athens, Ohio, Ohio University, 1978
- Islam in Indonesia: Challenges and Opportunities, in: Cyriac K. Pullapilly, ed., Islam in the Modern World, Bloomington, Indiana: Crossroads, 1982
- “The Necessity of Renewing Islamic Thought and Reinvigorating Religious Understanding”, in: Charles Kurzman, ed. Liberal Islam: A Sourcebook, New York: Oxford University Press, 1988
- “In Search of Islamic Roots for Modern Pluralism: The Indonesian Experiences” in: Mark Woodward ed, Towards a New Paradigm, Recent Developments in Indonesian Islamic Thought, Tempe, Arizona, Arizona State University, 1996
