= Syarif Hidayatullah State Islamic University Jakarta =

University in Indonesia

State Islamic University Syarif Hidayatullah Jakarta
- Universitas Islam Negeri Syarif Hidayatullah Jakarta
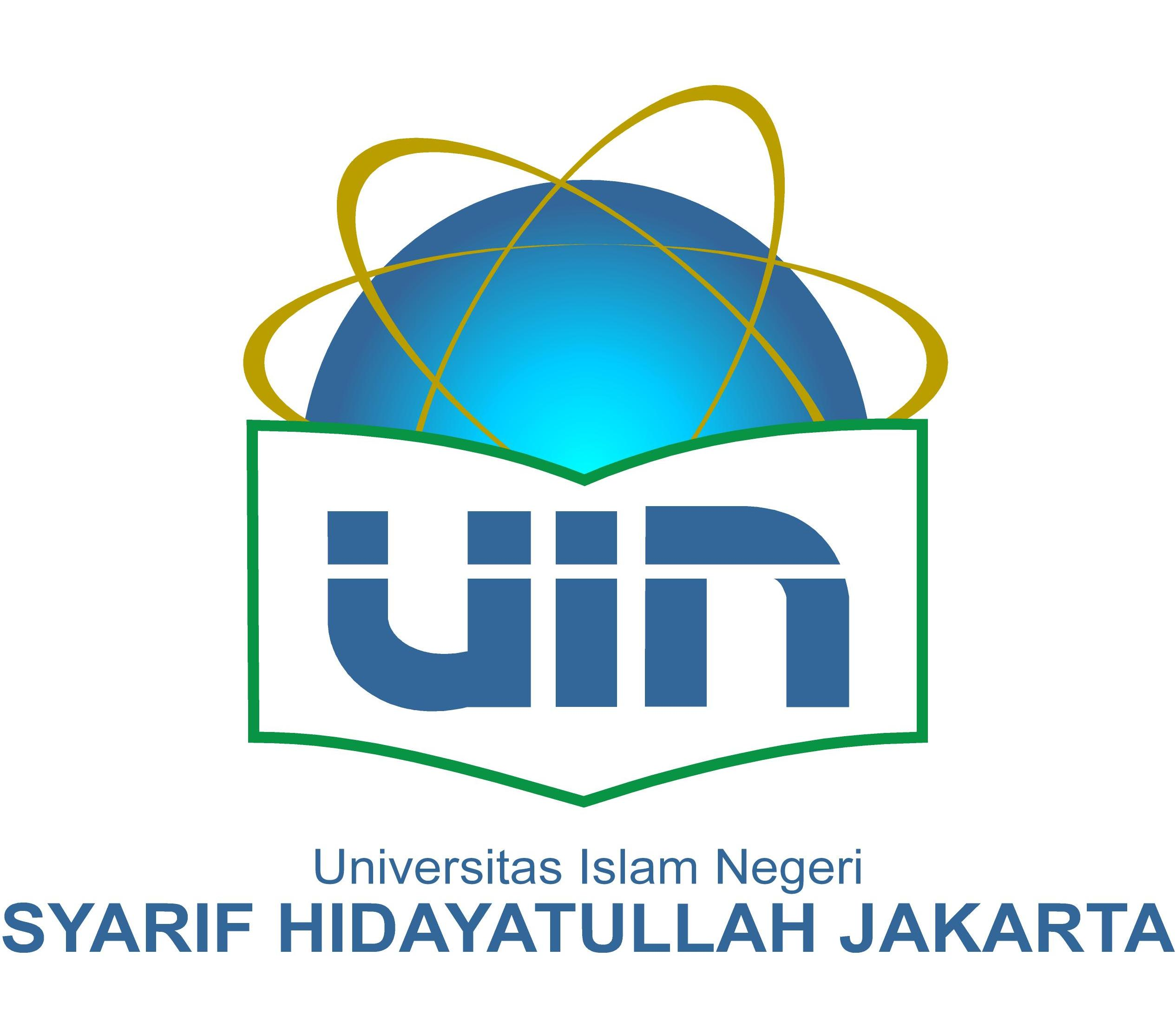
- State Islamic University Syarif Hidayatullah Jakarta's Symbol
- Motto: Knowledge, Piety, Integrity
- Type: State University
- Established: June 1, 1957 as ADIA (Academy Bureaus of Religious Sciences/Akademi Dinas Ilmu Agama)
- Affiliations: FUIW
- Rector: Asep Saepudin Jahar
- Academic staff: ± 1,435
- Students: ± 23,000 students
- Location: South Tangerang, Banten, Indonesia; 6.3066928°S 106.756146°E
- Campus: Urban: Ir. H. Juanda, Ciputat, Kertamukti, Ciputat, Tarumanegara, Ciputat and Jl. Ibnu Batutah Ciputat
- Colours: Light Blue
- Website: www.uinjkt.ac.id

State Islamic University Syarif Hidayatullah Jakarta (Indonesian: Universitas Islam Negeri Syarif Hidayatullah Jakarta, Dutch: Staat Islamitisch Universiteit van Sjarief Hidajatoellah) is a public university in Indonesia, located in Ciputat, South Tangerang, Banten.

== Campuses ==
Syarif Hidayatullah State Islamic University Jakarta has three campuses in walking distance. Campus 1 is on Ir. H. Djuanda Street in Ciputat, Banten. Campus 1 (The main campus) comprises the Rectorate Building, Main Library, administrative offices, main auditorium, the guest house, the Student Center, Center for Integrated Laboratory, Bank Mandiri, BNI Bank, BRI Bank, and seven faculty buildings.

Campus 2 is on Kertamukti Street, only several hundred meters from Campus 1. It consists of the Postgraduate School, Language Centers, Syahida Inn Hotel, the Faculty Housing Complex, the Experimental Garden, sports facilities, Fathullah Mosque (the biggest mosque on campus), Syarif Hidayatullah Hospital, a student dormitory, National Information and Communication Technology (NICT), and three faculty buildings.

Campus 3 is on Tarumanegara Street, only several hundred meters from Campus 2. It consists of Faculty of Adab and Humanities and Clinic.

== History ==
On June 1, 2007, Syarif Hidayatullah State Islamic University Jakarta celebrated its fiftieth anniversary. For half a century, the university has carried out its mandate as an institution of learning and transmitting knowledge, a research institution that supports the process of nation building, and as an institution devoted to the community that provides programs to improve social welfare.

Syarif Hidayatullah State Islamic University Jakarta has gone through several periods: the founding, the al-Jami'ah faculty of IAIN, the IAIN Syarif Hidayatullah, and the Syarif Hidayatullah State Islamic University Jakarta.

It began as an academy called ADIA (Akademi Dinas Ilmu Agama or State Academy of Islamic Sciences) from 1957 to 1960. It then became one of the faculties of IAIN Yogyakarta (1960–1963), and from 1963 on IAIN Syarif Hidayatullah. With Presidential Decree No. 31 of 2002 by Presidential (May 20, 2002), it officially became Syarif Hidayatullah State Islamic University Jakarta.

=== Founding period ===
The establishment of Syarif Hidayatullah State Islamic University Jakarta is part of the historical development of Islamic schools in Indonesia, in response to the higher education needs of modern Islam that began long before Indonesia's independence. In the colonial era (Netherlands), Dr. Satiman Wirjosandjojo, one of the Muslim educated, sought to establish Luhur as an institution of higher Islamic learning. These efforts failed because of resistance from the Dutch colonial administrators.

Five years before the proclamation of Indonesian independence, the Islamic Religious Teachers Association (PGAI) in Padang founded the Islamic High School (STI). STI only ran for two years (1940–1942) because of the Japanese occupation. The Japanese occupation government promised to establish the Institute of Higher Religious Education in Jakarta. In response, Muslim leaders formed a foundation with Mohammad Hatta as chairman and Muhammad Natsir as secretary.

On July 8, 1945, the foundation established the Islamic Academy of Higher Education (STI). STI was in Jakarta and led by Abdul Kahar Muzakkar. Several other Muslim leaders were instrumental in the establishment and development of STI. They included Drs. Mohammad Hatta, KH. Kahar Mudzakkir, KH. Wahid Hasyim, KH. Mas Mansur, KH. Fathurrahman Kafrawi, and Farid Ma'ruf. In 1946, STI was moved to Yogyakarta following the move of the capital city state from Jakarta to Yogyakarta. In line with the development of a growing STI, on March 22, 1948, STI's name was changed to the Indonesian Islamic University (UII) with the addition of new faculties. In 1948, UII had four faculties:

- Faculty of Religion
- Faculty of Law
- Faculty of Economics
- Faculty of Education

The need for new recruits in civil servants for the Ministry of Religious Affairs became an important backdrop establishment of Islamic universities. To meet this need, the Faculty of Religion separated and transformed into the State Islamic University (PTAIN). This change is based on Government Regulation (PP) no. 34 of 1950. The preamble stated that PTAIN aims to provide high-level teaching Islamic studies and become the center of the development and deepening of the Islamic religious sciences. Based on the PP, PTAIN was established on September 26, 1950. PTAIN was led by KH. Muhammad Adnan; in 1951 there were as many as 67 students. In that period, PTAIN had three departments:

- Department Tarbiyah
- Department Qadla (Shariah)
- Department of Da'wah

Composition courses consisted of Arabic language, Introduction to Religious Studies, Islamic Jurisprudence Fiqh, Principles of Jurisprudence Usul Fiqh, Qur'anic Commentary Tafsir, Sayings of the Prophet Hadith, Theology Kalam, Philosophy Falsafa, Logic Mantiq, Ethics Akhlaq, Mysticism, Comparative Religion, OutreachDa'wah, Islamic History, History of Islamic Culture, Pedagogy, Life Science, Introduction to Indonesian Law, Principles of Public and Private Law, Ethnology, Sociology, and Economics. Students who pass the baccalaureate and doctoral earned a Bachelor of Arts (BA) or Doktorandus (Drs) respectively. Academic degrees continued to be offered on this basis until the 1980s.

=== ADIA period (1957–1960) ===
The need for teachers of Islamic religion in accordance with the demands of modernity in the 1950s led to the founding of the academy (ADIA) in Jakarta. ADIA was founded on June 1, 1957, with the aim to educate and prepare public servants for a degree to become a teacher of religion in public schools, in vocational schools, or in private religious schools. ADIA leadership was entrusted to Prof. Dr. H. Mahmud Yunus as dean and professor H. Bustami A. Gani as vice dean.

The period of study at ADIA was five years, consisting of a semi-academy of three years and two years at the college level. ADIA had three departments: Religious Education, Arabic, and Da'wah wal Ershad (Outreach and Propagation), also known as Imam Army Special Programs. The curriculum of ADIA was not very different from the curriculum of PTAIN, with some additional courses offered for the benefit of functional staff: Indonesian, Arabic, English, French, Hebrew, Pedagogy, General Science and Culture of Indonesia, History of Islamic Culture, Tafsir, Hadith, Musthalah Hadith, Fiqh, Usul Fiqh, chronicle Tasyri 'Islam, Kalam Science/Mantiq, Akhlaq Science/Mysticism, Philosophy Sciences, Comparative Religious Studies, and Education Society.

There were two main characteristics of ADIA.

- In accordance with its mandate, it trained students for working for the Ministry of Religious Affairs or the institutions it oversaw at that time, including religious instruction in public schools and private religious schools.
- In accordance with its mandate to prepare teachers of modern religion, the responsibility for the management and provision of ADIA budget came from the Bureau of Religious Education (Japenda) in the Department of Religion, which had the task of managing the madrasa and preparing teachers of modern Islam in public schools.

=== Al-Jami'ah Faculty of IAIN Yogyakarta period (1960–1963) ===
Within a decade, PTAIN showed encouraging progress. The number of students grew with the increasingly broad scope of learning. PTAIN students came from Indonesia and from neighboring countries such as Malaysia, Brunei Darussalam, and Singapore. The rising number of students and expansion of the fields of studies demanded the expansion and additions of institutional capacities, faculties and departments as well as the composition of subjects. To meet this need, ADIA in Jakarta and Yogyakarta PTAIN were integrated into a single Islamic institution of higher education. Integration was implemented with the release of Decree President of the Republic of Indonesia No. 11 of 1960 dated 24 August 1960. Per Presidential Decree the name was changed from PTAIN to the State Islamic Institute (IAIN) al-Jami'ah al-Islamiyah al-Hukumiyah. IAIN was inaugurated by the Minister of Religious Affairs Republic of Indonesia in Building Kepatihan Yogyakarta.

=== IAIN with wider mandate ===
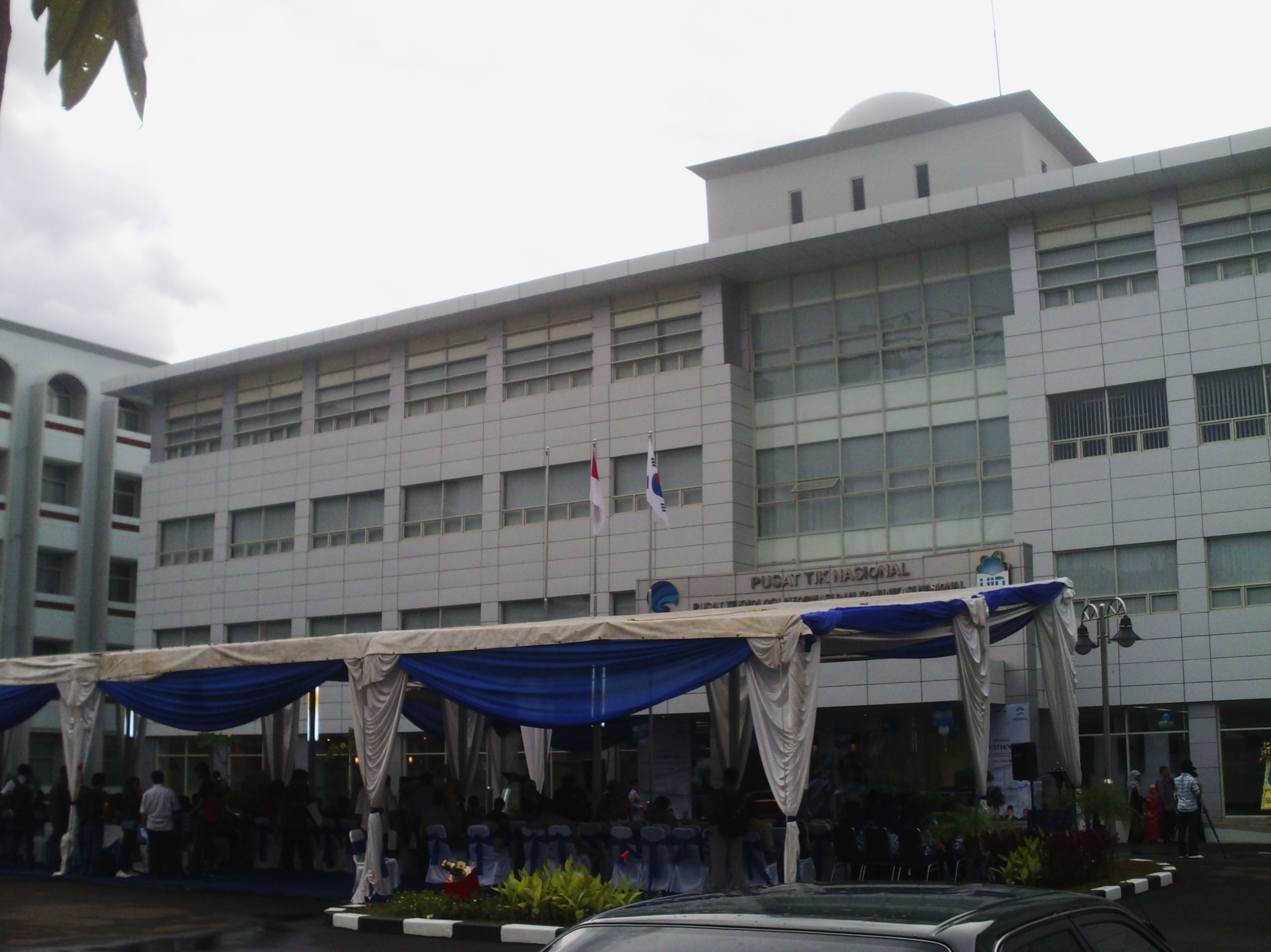
The opening ceremony of the National Information, Communication and Technology Center

IAIN Syarif Hidayatullah Jakarta, one of the country's many IAIN, is the oldest in Indonesia. It occupies a unique and strategic position. It is a "window to Islam in Indonesia" and a symbol for the progress of national development, particularly in the field of socio-religious development.

To integrate general knowledge and science of religion with Islamic teachings, this body began to develop the IAIN concept with a broader mandate ("IAIN with Wider Mandate") toward the formation of Syarif Hidayatullah State Islamic University Jakarta. This conversion plan was intensified in the academic year 1998/1999 under the leadership of Prof. Dr. Azyumardi Azra, with the opening of departments of psychology, and Department of Mathematics at the Faculty of MT, and the Department of Economics and Islamic Banking in Faculty of Sharia. To further strengthen this conversion, in 2000 the Agrobusiness Studies Program was added, as were the Information Engineering Program in cooperation with Institut Pertanian Bogor (IPB) and the Agency for the Assessment and Application of Technology (BPPT), and the Program Management and Accounting. In 2001 the Faculty of Psychology was inaugurated, as was the Dirasat Islamiyah program in cooperation with Al-Azhar University, Egypt. In addition, the university conducted a joint effort with the Islamic Development Bank (IDB) as the lender of development of modern campus and entered cooperation agreements with McGill University through the Canadian International Development Agency (CIDA), Leiden University (INIS), Al-Azhar University (Cairo), King Saud University (Riyadh), University of Indonesia, Institut Pertanian Bogor (IPB), Ohio University, the Indonesian Institute of America (IIA), Agency for the Assessment and Application of Technology (BPPT), Bank Negara Indonesia, Bank Muamalat Indonesia, and other universities and institutions.

A further step toward accreditation as a UIN was made with the signing of the Joint Decree between the Minister of National Education No. 4/U/KB/2001 and Minister of Religious Affairs No. 500/2001 dated 21 November 2001. Furthermore, through its letter No. 088796/MPN/2001 dated 22 November 2001, the Director General of Higher Education Department of Education recommended the opening of 12 programs of study that included courses of social sciences and exact sciences — Information Systems, Accounting, Management, Social Economics of Agriculture / Agribusiness, Psychology, English Language and Literature, Library Science, Mathematics, Chemistry, Physics, and Biology.

The draft presidential decree on the amendment form that becomes Syarif Hidayatullah State Islamic University Jakarta has also received the recommendations and considerations RI State Minister for Administrative Reform and the Ministry of Finance DG Budget Number 02/M-PAN/1/2002 dated January 9, 2002 and No. S −490/MK-2/2002 February 14, 2002. These recommendations form the basis for Presidential Decree No. 031 dated 20 May 2002 on changes from IAIN Syarif Hidayatullah Jakarta to Syarif Hidayatullah State Islamic University Jakarta.

=== Syarif Hidayatullah State Islamic University Jakarta period ===
With Presidential Decree No. 31 dated May 20, 2002, IAIN Syarif Hidayatullah Jakarta officially became Syarif Hidayatullah State Islamic University Jakarta. The opening was performed by Vice President of the Republic of Indonesia on 8 June 2002 in conjunction with the ceremony of the 45th anniversary and Lustrum the 9th and the first campus development Syarif Hidayatullah State Islamic University Jakarta through funds by the Islamic Development Bank (IDB).

The Faculty of Medicine and Health Sciences (Public Health Study Program) was opened in accordance with a decree of the Minister of National Education No. 1338 / D/T/2004 Year 2004 date 12 April 2004 and the Director General of Islamic Institutions of the operating license of Public Health Study Program Undergraduate Program (S-1) at the State Islamic University (UIN) Syarif Hidayatullah Jakarta Number Dj.II/37/2004 on May 19, 2004.

== Rectorate and faculty ==
=== Rectorate ===
- Rector: Prof. Asep Saepudin Jahar, M.A., Ph.D.
- Vice Rector for Academic Affairs: Prof. Dr. Ahmad Tholabi, S.Ag., S.H., M.H., M.A.
- Vice Rector for General Administration: Dr. Imam Subchi, M.A.
- Vice Rector for Student Affairs: Prof. Ali Munhanif, M.A., Ph.D.
- Vice Rector for Cooperation and Institutional Development: Din Wahid, M.A., Ph.D

=== Faculties and programs ===
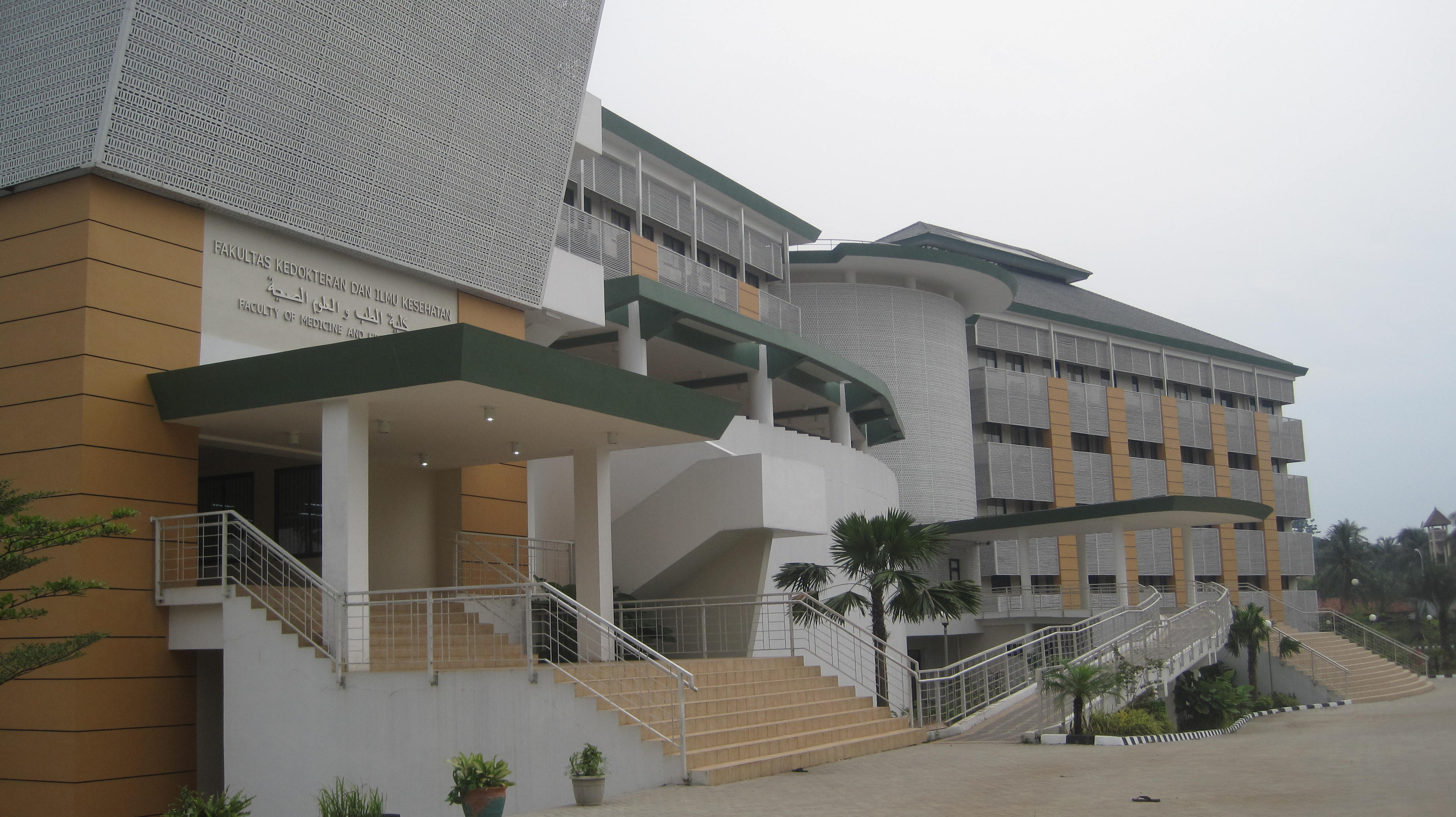
Faculty of Medical and Health Science Building

Syarif Hidayatullah State Islamic University Jakarta consists of 12 faculties and one Graduate School (SPs).

== Campuses ==
UIN Syarif Hidayatullah Jakarta has four campuses. Campus I on Jl. Ir. H. Juanda Chester; Campus II on Jl. Kertamukti Chester; Campus III on Jl. Tarumanegara Chester. Education facilities available in Campus I, II, III, and IV are:

== Connected institutions ==
UIN Jakarta supervises and coordinates the following institutions:

=== Structural institutions ===
These are work units, for example, the existence of which are explicitly expressed in the structure of UIN organization. Such units are as follows:

- Research Center
- Social Service Center
- Computer Center
- Main Library

=== Non-structural institutions ===
These are institutions that are functionally recognized by the rector but are outside the organization structure of the UIN. The work units that belong to this category are as follows:

- Coordinating Office of Private Islamic Higher Learning Institutions (Kopertais) of Region I
- Syahid Foundation
- Triguna Jaya Foundation
- Civil Servants' Cooperative
- Board for Islamic Community Services (BUPERDA)
- Syahid Clinic
- Madrasah Pembangunan
- UIN Jakarta Press
- Ketilang Kindergarten
- Students' and Alumni organizations
- Center for Languages and Cultures
- Center for Women's Studies
- Center for Islamic and Social Studies
- Center for Human Resources Development
- Center for Legal and Human Rights Consultation
- Center for Environmental Studies
- Center for Management Development
- Center for Teaching and Learning Development
- Center for the Study of Philosophy
- Center for the Development of Science and Technology
- Center for Applied Psychology
- Center for Entrepreneurship and Economics Development
- Indonesian Center for Civic Education
- Research Center for Islamic Heritage and Local Project Implementing Unit

The students' organizations are intra-organizations which regulate and implement extra-curricular and scientific students' activities, as well as the development of students' interests and talents at all levels: university, faculties, and departments.

== Notable alumni ==
- Harun Nasution
- Azyumardi Azra
- Bachtiar Effendy
- Komaruddin Hidayat
- Dede Rosyada
- Said Aqil Siradj
- Nasaruddin Umar
- Sholeh Mahmoed Nasution
- Ayang Utriza Yakin

== See also ==
- List of Islamic educational institutions
