= Rajawali =

Rajawali may refer to:

- Rajawali, Firozabad, a village in Uttar Pradesh, India
- Rajawali, Sambhal, a village in Sambhal district, Uttar Pradesh, India
- Rajawali Corpora, an Indonesian corporation
- Rajawali Place, a mixed-use development in Jakarta, Indonesia
- Rajawali railway station, a railway station in Jakarta, Indonesia
- Rajawali Sultan Gorontalo F.C., a football club based in Gorontalo, Indonesia
- Rajawali (TV series), an Indonesian TV series
- RCTI, an Indonesian TV network also known as Rajawali Citra Televisi Indonesia
- RTV (Indonesian TV network), an Indonesian TV network also known as Rajawali Televisi

== See also ==
- Rajauli
