= Hilman Hariwijaya =

Indonesian writer (1964–2022)

- Born: 25 August 1964; Jakarta, Indonesia
- Died: 9 March 2022 (aged 57); Jakarta, Indonesia
- Occupation: Writer
- Years active: 1986–2022
- Spouses: Nadia Marinka; Nessa Sadin
- Children: Navika Tatjana Hariwijaya; Adellicia Hariwijaya

Hilman Hariwijaya (25 August 1964 – 9 March 2022) was an Indonesian writer, better known for a short story entitled Lupus in Hai magazine in December 1986, which was later published into a novel. Hariwijaya died in Jakarta on 9 March 2022, at the age of 57, from COVID-19.

== Works ==
=== Books ===
- Lupus
  - Lupus ABG
  - Lupus Kecil
- Olga
- Lulu
- Vanya
- Vladd

=== Screenwriter ===
Films

- Dealova (2005)
- The Wall (2007)
- Anak Ajaib (2008)
- Suka Ma Suka (2009)
- Rasa (2009)

TV series

- Cinta Fitri
- Separuh Aku (2012)
- Cinta 7 Susun (2013)
- Anak Jalanan (2015–17)
- Anak Langit (2017-2020)
- Boy (2017)
- Anak Band (2020-2021)
- Love Story the series (2021-2022)
- Badai Pasti Berlalu (2021)
