= Cut Meyriska =

Indonesian actress (born 1993)

- Born: Cut Ratu Meyriska; May 26, 1993 (age 32); Medan, North Sumatera, Indonesia
- Occupations: Celebrity; Singer; Model
- Years active: 2008–present
- Spouse: Roger Danuarta (m. 2019)

Cut Ratu Meyriska (born May 26, 1993) is an Indonesian actress, singer, and model of Acehnese descent. She is known for her roles as an antagonist on various shows.

== Personal life ==
She featured in the soap opera Suci in 2007 at the age of 14 and appeared on the soap Kepompong at the age of 15. She then appeared in the soap opera Arti Sahabat in 2010. She became famous for her role as a mistress in the soap opera Catatan Hati Seorang Istri in 2014. She appeared on Catatan Hati Seorang Istri in 2016 as an antagonist named Karin, whose nickname was "Hello Kitty". She appeared in the soap opera Boy in 2017. In 2018, she played a tomboy character named Manda on the show, Anak Langit.

She married soap opera star and singer Roger Danuarta on August 17, 2019, the reception was on August 25, 2019. and on July 17, 2020, Cut Meyriska gave birth to her first child, Shaquille Kaili Danuarta. On April 22, 2022, Cut Meyriska gave birth to her second child, Jourell Kenzie Danuarta. Cut Meyriska returned to acting in 2023, with her role in the soap opera, Belok Kanan Jalan Terus.

== Filmography ==
=== Movies ===
Years	Titles	Roles	Years	Ref.
2009	Suka Ma Suka	Teman Bella	Cameo	
2012	Seandainya			
2018	Yowis Ben	Susan		
2018	Jaran Goyang	Elena		
2018	Kesempatan Kedu(d)a	Syafa		
2019	Yowis Ben 2	Susan		
2019	Ajari Aku Islam	Fidya S. Lubis		
2020	#BerhentidiKamu	Syafira	Original Film of Disney+ Hotstar	
2021	Pintu Surga Terakhir	Irma		
2021	Yowis Ben 3	Susan		
2021	Yowis Ben Finale	Susan		
2022	Ada Mertua di Rumahku	Nirmala	Original Film of KlikFilm	
2022	Cinta Subuh	Ralyna Taslimah		

=== Television series ===
Years	Titles	Roles	Notes	Ref.
2007	Suci	Nadia	Debut	
2007	Cinta Bunga	Arini		
2008	Kepompong	Beverly		
2009	Buku Harian Baim	Jessica		
2009	Ulat Kepompong	Beverly		
2010–2011	Arti Sahabat	Vita Agung	2 Seasons	
2011–2012	Dewa	Riska		
2012	Karunia	Riska		
2012–2013	Kutunggu Kau di Pasar Minggu the Series	Gia Gardian		
2013	Berkah	Widia		
2013	TV Movie		Episode: '"Cinta Semalam"	
2013	TV Movie		Episode: "Perempuan di Pinggir Jalan"	
2013	Tendangan dari Langit the Series	Sofie Meyriska		
2013	Magic	Citra		
2014	Cinta Anak Cucu Adam	Vera		
2014	Kau yang Berasal dari Bintang	Inggrid		
2014	Catatan Hati Seorang Istri	Helena Karin		
2014	7 Manusia Harimau	Putri Semidang Rindu		
2015–2017	Anak Jalanan	Adriana		
2016	Catatan Hati Seorang Istri 2	Helena Karin		
2017	Berkah Cinta	Nella		
2017	TV Movie		Episode: "10 Pemuda untuk Bung Karno"	
2017	TV Movie		Episode: "Anak-Anak Merah Putih"	
2017	Boy	Kitty		
2017	Putri Titipan Tuhan	Lula Salman		
2017	Saur Sepuh the Series	Dewi Harnum		
2017	Dia	Shinta		
2018	Cinta Kedua	Sania Anindhita		
2018	Anak Langit	Adinda		
2018	Anak Langit	Amanda		
2018	Dosa	Arumi		
2019	Istri-Istri Akhir Zaman	Sofie		
2023	Belok Kanan Jalan Terus	Sekar		

=== Television films ===
- Si Bintit Tukang Ngintip
- Pacarku Banyak Aturan
- Cintaku Kejedot Angkot
- Pacarku Superstar

== Discography ==
Years	Titles	Albums	Notes	Ref.
2016	"Jilbab Traveler"	Singles	theme song Jilbab Traveler: Love Sparks in Korea	
2016	"Wonderful Life (Mi Oh My)"	with Matoma		
2017	"Aku Tetap Setia Meski Kamu Mendua"			
