= Nasya (given name) =

Nasya is a feminine given name of Hebrew origin meaning "miracle of Yahweh". Its variant forms include: Nasiah, Nasiya, Nasiyah, Nasyah, and Naysa. Derived names are Nacia (Polish), Nadjae, Nadjah, Nagwa, Nagwah, Nainsey, Nainsi, Naissa (French), Naja (Arabic), Najae, Najah (Arabic), Najee, Najei, Najja, Najwa (Arabic), Nakee, Nakey, Nakeya, Nakeyah, Naki.

== Notable people ==
- Nasya Dimitrova (born 1992), Bulgarian volleyball player
- Nasya Marcella (born 1996), Indonesian actress
