= Cinta Setelah Cinta =

Indonesian drama romantic television series

- Genre: Melodrama; Romance
- Created by: Alfian Bumulo
- Screenplay by: Serena Luna
- Story by: Serena Luna
- Directed by: Umam A.P.
- Creative director: Sridhar Jetty
- Starring: Ririn Dwi Ariyanti; Eza Gionino; Indah Indriana; Bryan Mckenzie; Adjie Pangestu; Sasha Alexa; Nunu Datau; Ben Kasyafani; Dinda Kanyadewi; Tsania Marwa; Rangga Azof; Dylan Carr; Ana Pinem; Farhan Rasyid; William Roberts; Teuku Ryan; Rey Bong; Aqeela Calista; Fatimah Az Zahra; Diandra Salsabila Lubis; Miko Saputra; Adipura; Windy Wulandari; Tabah Penemuan Siregar; Sandrinna Michelle; Reza Levi; Fanny Fadillah; Icha Nabilah; Irwan Chandra; Mario Maulana
- Theme music composer: Melly Goeslaw
- Opening theme: "Rela" by Shanna Shannon
- Ending theme: "Rela" by Shanna Shannon
- Composer: Bella Maritza
- Country of origin: Indonesia
- Original language: Indonesian
- No. of seasons: 1
- No. of episodes: 639

Production
- Executive producer: David S. Suwarto
- Producer: Alfian Bumulo
- Cinematography: Leopold H. Tomasouw
- Editors: Fangky Yushatta; Tantan Hadiyansyah; Faisal Yunus; Teddy Gunawan; Eko H.P.
- Camera setup: Multi-camera
- Running time: 60-100 minutes
- Production company: SinemArt

Original release
- Network: SCTV (2022–2023); Vidio (2023)
- Release: 16 May 2022 – 7 October 2023

Cinta setelah Cinta (English: Love After Love) is an Indonesian romantic drama television series created by Alfian Bumulo. It premiered on 16 May 2022 on SCTV and it is digitally available on Vidio. It stars Ririn Dwi Ariyanti, Eza Gionino, and Indah Indriana. From 6 October to 7 October 2023, the show exclusively streamed on Vidio.

== Plot ==
Starla and Niko are a perfect couple. They have two children, namely Nila and Daffa. However, Niko is secretly in a relationship with Ayu (Starla and Niko's old high school friend). They both try to hide the affair from anyone. One day, Ilham (Ayu's husband) caught them making out in the car. Niko and Ayu run away, Ilham chases them. Unfortunately, the three of them ended up having an accident.

Ilham was critical and experienced brain stem death so he could not survive. Previously, Ilham had registered as an organ donor. In fact, it was Ilham who ended up donating his heart to Niko, as well as other organs to different people. Starla feels indebted to Ayu for donating her late husband's heart. He is also deceived by Ayu's sweet attitude, who actually becomes an enemy in disguise.

Apart from Niko, Arya (Starla's stepbrother) also received an eye donation from Ilham. Starla and Arya have a bad relationship because of their painful past. Fondi (Starla's father) is having an affair with Mayang (Arya's mother). For the sake of wealth and Fondi, Mayang chose to leave Arya and Hardi (Arya's father). However, gradually the relationship between Arya and Starla began to improve. Arya begins to pay attention to Starla, growing in love.

== Cast ==
=== Main ===
- Ririn Dwi Ariyanti as Starla Monica Brahmantya Himawan
- Eza Gionino as Niko Wijaya
- Indah Indriana as Ayu Subagio
- Bryan Mckenzie as Arya Hardiman / Yudha

=== Recurring ===
- Adjie Pangestu as Fondi Brahmantya Himawan
- Sasha Alexa as Mayang Sri Wulandari
- Nunu Datau as Elva Wijaya
- Ben Kasyafani as Ilyas Panuluh / Ruben Kusnadi / Ilham Panuluh
- Dinda Kanyadewi as Ayumi Nirmala
- Tsania Marwa as Rina
- Rangga Azof as Rangga
- Dylan Carr as Joni
- Ana Pinem as Yuningsih
- Farhan Rasyid as Sakti Fabian
- William Roberts as Edo Fabian
- Teuku Ryan as Rafael
- Rey Bong as Ipang
  - as Rey Suteja
- Aqeela Calista as Obin Himawan
- Fatimah Az Zahra as Nila Wijaya
- Diandra Salsabila Lubis as Kana
- Miko Saputra as Tio Panuluh
- Adipura as Rian Wijaya / Hendrawan Suteja
- Windy Wulandari as Windy Suteja
- Tabah Penemuan Siregar as Arto
- Riska Riyanti as Sumi
- Arsenio Rafisqy as Arlos
- Naura Fiorenza as Ruby Lara Haidar Hardiman
- Anton Qubro as Fadil
- Ananda Faturrahman as Chintya Agatha
- Muthia Datau as Ranti
- Rico Tampatty as Hardiman
- Philip de May as Beno
- Fanny Fadillah as Fanny
- Mario Maulana as Jodi
- Eeng Saptahadi as Cecep/Bejo
- Anthony Xie as Billy Kusnadi
- Natalie Zenn as Irma
- Irwan Chandra as Jimmy Juhanda
- David Hoffman as Wahyu Fabian
- Sandrinna Michelle as Citra
- Sigit Hardadi as Basir
- Henny Timbul as Wuri
- Rizuka as Cassandra
- Mischa Chandrawinata as Faris Mahesa
- Umar Lubis as Rudolf Haidar
- Ika Dihardjo as Gadis Maharani
- Dearly Dave Sompie as Dirly Dave
- Nadya Arina as Yumiko / Mimi
- Mahdy Reza as Reza
- Icha Nabilah as Widya
- Vina Adam as Ambar
- Bobby Malik as Hartanto
- Marcel Chandrawinata as Jack
- Darren Ronaldy as Dafa Wijaya
- Noel Hutabarat as Rian Wijaya
- Mila Rahmawati as Valerie Fabian
- Sylvia Menul as Neni Sentosa
- Nadhira Lubis as Starla
- Muhammad Fauzan as Arya / Yuda
- Gina Naureen Dhya as Dina
- Reza Levi as Devan
- Nenny Arap as Siti
- Ali Rozza as Vincenzo
- Hakiem Aziz as Reno
- Dealova Rachman as Yoan
- Ine Dewi as Rina
- Michelle Tan as Vivi
- Putri Farin as Anita
- Shandy Ishabella as Olivia
- Lily Zalea as Vivian Kusuma
- Alin Alfauziah as Ayumi
- Farell Akbar as Bastian
- Meinorizah as Rara
- Nayaka Syarif as Linda
- Richelle Skornicki as Dila
- Electra Leslie as Herself
- Gabriella Quinlyn as Herself
- Ferry Sahertian as Warto
- Andrew Barrett as Galih
- Shakila Zahira Nayara as Luna
- Fredy Amin as Albert
- Andre Geovano as Franky
- Miradz Flow as Helmi
- Teguh Yulianto as Faris
- Deddy Muzammil as Hulk
- Emir Pahlevi as Emir
- Jaka Tarup as Domino
- Yanah as Ambar
- Dita Rientika as Siska

== Production ==
=== Casting ===
In November 2022, Dinda Kanya Dewi entered the show as the main antagonist Ayumi. In October 2022, Sandrinna Michelle was chosen to play Citra. In December 2022, Aqeela Calista was roped in to play Obin Himawan. In the same month, Rey Bong to play the role of Ipang but he quit the show. In August 2023, he re-enter the show with other characters as Rey Suteja. In September 2023, Rangga Azof was selected to portray Rangga.

== Original soundtrack ==
Cinta Setelah Cinta

Soundtrack album by Various artists
- Released: 2022 - 2023
- Genre: Soundtrack
- Length: 46:42
- Language: Indonesian
- Labels: Trinity Optima Production; Alfa Records; Legenda Musik Indonesia; Pelangi Records; SMD Records; Wahana Production; Musica Studios

=== Cinta Setelah Cinta (Original Television Soundtrack) ===
Tracklist

No.	Title	Artist	Length
1.	"Rela"	Shanna Shannon	4:04
2.	"Anugrah Terindah"	Indra Sinaga	4:29
3.	"Bintang #Katakan Padanya"	Dirly Dave	3:50
4.	"Tuhan Jaga Dia"	Paolo Lee	3:59
5.	"Tentang Rindu"	Virzha, Eltasya	4:59
6.	"Ku dengannya Kau dengan Dia"	Afgan	4:29
7.	"Oh Inikah Cinta"	Kiara Karin	3:30
8.	"Disaat Kau Pergi"	Dirly Dave	3:54
9.	"Selagi Aku Bernafas"	Sarah Mukti	4:15
10.	"Jangan Pergi Lagi"	Igo Pentury	4:25
11.	"Belum Siap Kehilangan"	Stevan Pasaribu	4:48
Total length:			46:42
