= Ciputra Artpreneur =

International-standard theater in Indonesia (founded by Ciputra)

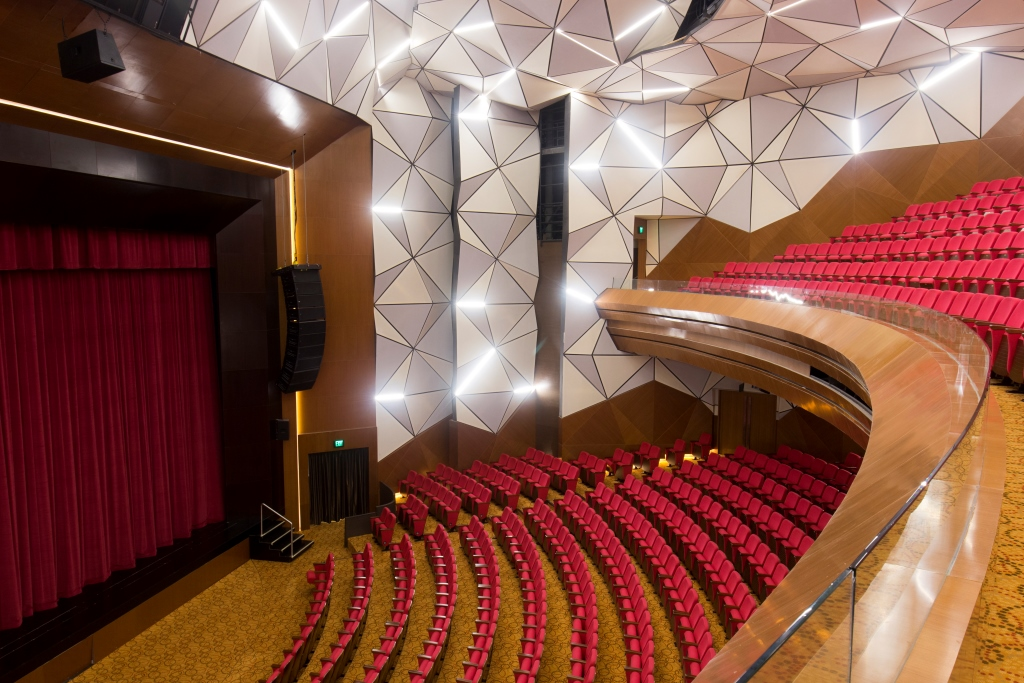
- Interior of Ciputra Artpreneur Theater
- Interactive map of the Ciputra Artpreneur area

General information
- Location: Kuningan, Jakarta, Indonesia, Ciputra World, Retail Podium, Jl. Prof. DR. Satrio No.1 Kav. 3-5, RT.18/RW.4, Kuningan, Karet Kuningan, Kota Jakarta Selatan, Daerah Khusus Ibukota Jakarta 12940, Indonesia
- Coordinates: 6.2236556°S 106.8233753°E

Website
- www.ciputraartpreneur.com

Ciputra Artpreneur is a multi-disciplinary arts venue located in Kuningan, Jakarta. It offers a 1,141-seat international standard theater, a multi-function hall accommodating up to 2,000 guests, and Dr. (HC) Ir. Ciputra’s private museum, which displays 32 paintings and 18 sketches of Hendra Gunawan. The artpreneur is often used for hosting exhibitions, conferences, concerts, weddings, product launches, awarding nights, business dinners, fashion show, and theatrical performances.

== Gallery ==
The Ciputra Artpreneur Gallery is a multi-function hall accommodating up to 2,000 guests that can host a variety of events and activities that contribute to the center's financial sustainability. Being a white-box space, the Ciputra Artpreneur Gallery has hosted a wide variety of events, such as UOB Painting of the Year, Sebastian Gunawan’s annual fashion show, Google Android One Event, BMW and Mercedes-Benz car shows, New Cities Summit, and private weddings.

== Theater ==
The Ciputra Artpreneur Theater has hosted international performances, such as Beauty and the Beast, Annie, Shrek, The Red Lantern, Toyota Classic Concert, The Musical Journey of Dwiki Dharmawan concert and local theater productions such as the opera Carmen by the Resonanz, Lasem by D’Art Beat, Di Atas Rata-Rata by Erwin Gutawa and Gita Gutawa, Janji Toba by Banyu Wening, and Senandung Keroncong Indonesia by Sundari Soekotjo.

== Museum ==
Ciputra Artpreneur Museum is home to the largest collection of Hendra Gunawan's artworks in Indonesia. The museum displays 32 paintings and 18 sketches of Hendra Gunawan. The artwork is a private collection of Dr. (HC) Ir. Ciputra. The museum's operates from Tuesday to Sunday, between 12 PM and 6 PM.

== Awards ==
- A Golden Medal for the FIABCI Prix D'Excellence Award 2016
- 2 Museum Rekor Indonesia (MURI) Awards: Exhibition Gallery with the Largest Projection Screen and Performance Theater at the Highest Floor
- Golden Achievement Award in Purposed Built Category from REI Property 2016
- The Innovative Property Public Facility from Property Indonesia Award 2017
