= Fildha Elishandi =

Indonesian actress

- Born: March 12, 1991 (age 34); Malang, Indonesia
- Occupation: Actress

Fildha Elishandi (born March 12, 1991) is an actress from Indonesia. She began her career in the world of film through films Putih Abu-Abu dan Sepatu Kets.

== Filmography ==
- Putih Abu-Abu dan Sepatu Kets (2009)
