= Shanna Shannon =

- Born: Shanna Shannon Siswanto; April 4, 2006 (age 20); Jakarta, Indonesia
- Education: University of Indonesia
- Occupations: Singer, youtuber
- Known for: Ambassador of the Indonesian National Anthem

YouTube information
- Channel: Shanna Shannon
- Genres: Music; Vlog
- Subscribers: 734 thousand
- Views: 103.7 million
- Musical career
- Genres: Pop; National Anthem
- Instrument: Vocal
- Label: Trinity Optima Production
- Last updated: 27 July 2024

Shanna Shannon Siswanto (born 4 April 2006) is an Indonesian actress, singer, and YouTuber. In 2017, Anies Baswedan appointed Shannon as an ambassador of the Indonesian National Anthem.

== Career ==
Shanna Shannon started uploading cover songs of national anthems in 2015, with her first cover video of the song "Indonesia Pusaka". In addition to uploading cover videos, Shanna Shannon frequently performs at events to sing national anthems. In 2016, Shanna Shannon auditioned for a premiere event at Marina Bay, Singapore. She became one of Asia's representatives for singing and acting at Walt Disney World.

In 2017, she was appointed as the Ambassador of the Indonesian National Anthem by Anies Baswedan at the 2017 Kirab Kebangsaan event.

On the 75th Anniversary of Indonesia Independence Day, Shanna Shannon and Dul Jaelani released a single titled "Anak Negeri". In 2021, she officially released the song "Kamu Dan Kenangan (You and Memories)" composed by Melly Goeslaw and originally performed by Maudy Ayunda. She had previously covered the song in 2019, and the video was viewed over 20 million times on YouTube. This attracted the copyright owner, Trinity Optima Production, to release it on digital platforms. At that time, she also officially signed a contract with Trinity Optima. In September 2021, Shanna Shannon launched a music program titled "Sing with Shannon" which aired on Gojek's GoPlay. She released her first single with Trinity Optima on September 24, 2021, titled "Rela," which was composed by Melly Goeslaw and later became the theme song for the soap opera Cinta setelah Cinta in 2022.

== Personal life ==
Shanna Shannon studied at Morning Star Academy in Kuningan, South Jakarta and graduated in 2024. She was admitted to Universitas Indonesia's International Class in 2024 and will soon begin her studies.

== Discography ==
=== Single ===
- "Kamu Dan Kenangan (You and Memories)" (2021)
- "Rela" (2021) (OST. Cinta Setelah Cinta)
- "Terlalu Sayang" (2022) (OST. Dia Yang Kau Pilih)
- "Karma" (2022) (OST. Rindu Bukan Rindu)
- "Haunting" (2023) (duet with Stevan Pasaribu; OST. Ijabah Cinta)
- "Doa Kami" (2024)
- "Kehilanganmu" (2024) (OST. Naik Ranjang)
- "Janjiku Indonesia" (2017)
- "Terima Kasih Ibu" (2018)
- "Indonesia Banget" (2019)
- "Tebar Kebaikan" (2020)
- "Anak Negeri" (2020) (duet with Dul Jaelani) on Nyanyian Anak Negeri album

== Performances ==
- Sapa Indonesia KompasTV (2015)
- Kampanye Kemerdekaan (Independence campaign 2016)
- Tomohon International Flower Festival (2016)
- Premiere Program Walt Disney World, Florida (2016)
- Pilkada Serentak MetroTV (Simultaneous Regional Elections MetroTV 2017)
- Gema Takbir DKI Jakarta (Special Region of Jakarta's Echo of Takbir 2017)
- Pesta Sahabat RTV (RTV friends party 2017)
- Kirab Kebangsaan Hari Pahlawan (National Parade for Heroes' Day 2017)
- Kejuaraan Akuatik Indonesia Terbuka (Indonesia Open Aquatic Championship 2017)
- The opening of 2018 – 2019 Piala Indonesia
- Liputan 6 Awards 2018 (2018)
- The opening of 2018 Asian Para Games
- Dubi Dubi Dam (2019)
- The Opening of 2019 Indonesia President's Cup
- Superyouth GTV (2020)
- Pejuang Garis Depan Metro TV (Frontline Warrior Metro TV 2020)
- Kick Andy (2020)
- Konser Bersatu Melawan Corona (United Concert Against Corona 2020)
- Dari Rumah Kita Bisa MetroTV (From Home We Can Metro TV 2020)
- Terima Kasih Indonesia Metro TV (Thank You Indonesia 2020)
- Batara Spekta Gala Show (2021)
- Sing with Shannon GoPlay (2021)
- Dahsyatnya 2021 (2021)
- Indonesian Television Awards 2022 (2022)
- The Musical Journey of Dwiki Dharmawan (2025)

== Filmography ==
=== Television film ===
- TV Movie: Untuk Noel (2017) as Noel

=== Webseries ===
Year	Title	Role	Channel	Notes
2021	Shanna Shannon	Herself	YouTube	Documentary series

== Awards and nominations ==
Year	Awards	Category	Nominated work	Result
2022	Anugerah Musik Indonesia	Newcomer of the Year	"Rela"	Nominated
2022	SCTV Awards	Most Popular Soundtrack for Television Series	"Rela"	Nominated
