= Ciputra =

Indonesian businessman and philanthropist

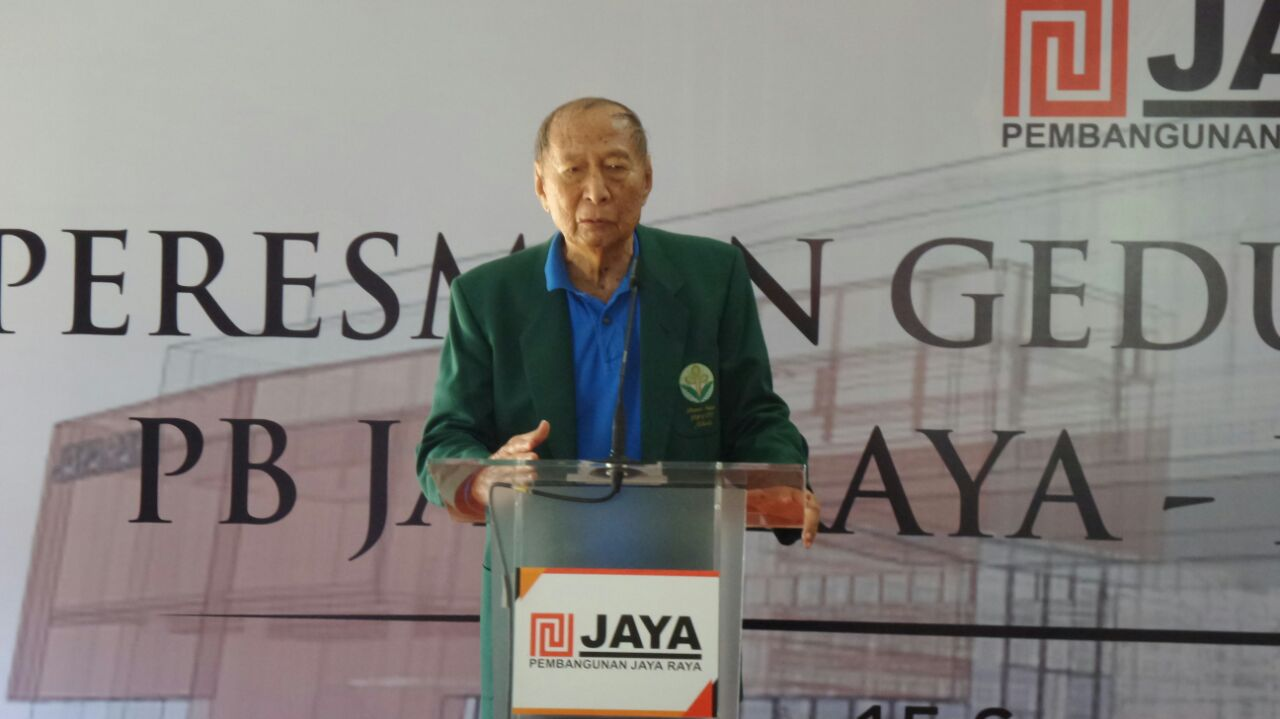
- Ciputra in 2016
- Born: Tjie Tjin Hoan; 24 August 1931; Parigi, Dutch East Indies (now Parigi Moutong, Central Sulawesi, Indonesia)
- Died: 27 November 2019 (aged 88); Central Region, Singapore
- Other name: Xu Zhen Huan
- Occupations: Businessman, investor, philanthropist
- Spouse: Dian Sumeler (died 22 December 2021)
- Children: 4
- Parent(s): Tjie Siem Poe; Lie Eng Nio

Chinese name
- Traditional Chinese: 徐振煥
- Simplified Chinese: 徐振焕
Transcriptions
Standard Mandarin
- Hanyu Pinyin: Xú Zhèn Huàn
Southern Min
- Hokkien POJ: Chhî Chín Hoàn

Ciputra (RSS: Tjiputra; born Tjie Tjin Hoan (Chinese: 徐振煥; Pe̍h-ōe-jī: Chhî Chín Hoàn); 24 August 1931 – 27 November 2019) was an Indonesian businessman, investor, and philanthropist. He founded Ciputra Group, one of Indonesia's largest real estate companies, with three subsidiaries, including Ciputra Development, listed on the Jakarta Stock Exchange. Known as one of Indonesia's most generous philanthropists, he established ten schools, the Ciputra University of Entrepreneurship in Surabaya, and the Ciputra Artpreneur Museum in Jakarta.

== Early life and education ==
Tjie Tjin Hoan was born on 24 August 1931 in the town of Parigi in Central Sulawesi, Dutch East Indies. He was the third child of Chinese Indonesian merchants Tjie Sim Poe (Chinese: 徐沈步) and Lie Eng Nio (Chinese: 李英娘) whose ancestral home was in Zhangzhou, Fujian. After Japan occupied the Dutch East Indies during World War II, Tjie's father was falsely accused of being a Dutch spy and arrested by the Japanese in 1943. Tjie never learned for sure what happened to his father, who was never heard from again and presumed to have died in prison.

Fatherless at age 12, Tjie grew up in poverty, but was able to resume his education after the end of World War II. After finishing high school in Manado, he entered the prestigious Bandung Institute of Technology to study architecture. He graduated in 1960.

At the age of 25, Tjie Tjin Hoan adopted the single name Ciputra. The “Ci” originates from his Chinese surname, Tjie, while “putra” translates to “son” in Indonesian.

== Career ==
While still studying architecture in university, Ciputra and two friends, Budi Brasali and Ismail Sofyan, started a consulting firm. After graduation, he decided to become a property developer instead of a consultant. Having earned the trust of Soemarno Sosroatmodjo, the Governor of Jakarta, he became CEO of Pembangunan Jaya (Jaya Group), a developer partly owned by the Jakarta provincial government. He worked for the company for 35 years and became a minority shareholder for his services. His major projects at Jaya included Ancol Dreamland and the Senen Market.

Together with his university friends Brasali and Sofyan, he also founded the Metropolitan Group. Serving as President Commissioner, he provided guidance to the company, which counts the Salim Group as an investor. Metropolitan developed Pondok Indah in Jakarta and invested abroad.

After his children graduated from universities overseas, Ciputra founded his family holding company, the Ciputra Group, for his four children. In addition to his children, his wife, brother, and children-in-law were all involved in its management. He also hired professional executives to manage the company, which developed more than 30 major projects in Indonesia and abroad, including Citra Raya in Surabaya.

The Ciputra Group was severely impacted by the 1997 Asian financial crisis, during which the value of the Indonesian rupiah plunged and the company's US dollar-denominated debts became far more burdensome. In addition, anti-Chinese riots broke out in Indonesia, forcing Ciputra to abandon several projects as sales plummeted. It took the group years to restructure its debts, and it did not regain profitability until 2005.

After recovering from the crisis, Ciputra diversified his business from Indonesia and invested in major projects in China, Cambodia, and Vietnam, where the group developed a high-profile international satellite city in Hanoi in partnership with the local government.

The Ciputra Group has three subsidiaries listed on the Jakarta Stock Exchange: Ciputra Development, Ciputra Surya, and Ciputra Property. Ciputra Development is one of Indonesia's largest listed property companies.

== Philanthropy ==
Ciputra was known as one of Indonesia's most generous philanthropists. Attributing his self-made success to his education, he established ten schools as well as the Ciputra University of Entrepreneurship in Surabaya. An avid art collector, in 2014 he opened the Ciputra Artpreneur Museum in Jakarta, which holds a large collection of works by his favourite artist, Hendra Gunawan.

== Personal life ==
When he was 24, Ciputra married Dian Sumeler, whom he had met in Sulawesi. The couple had four children: Rina, Junita, Cakra, and Candra. All four children serve on the boards of the Ciputra Group and Ciputra Development, and his son Candra Ciputra also serves as President of Ciputra Development.

== Death ==
On 27 November 2019, Ciputra died at age 88 at Gleneagles Hospital in Singapore, where he had been undergoing treatment for an illness. His wife, Dian Sumerler Ciputra, died on 22 December 2021.

Ciputra was buried in a private cemetery at Jonggol, West Java, on 5 December 2019.
