= Putih Abu-Abu dan Sepatu Kets =

- Directed by: Nayato Fio Nuala
- Written by: Viva Westi
- Produced by: Firman Bintang
- Starring: Arumi Bachsin; Adipati Koesmadji; Michella Putri; Rendy Septino; Rana Audi Marissa; Fildha Elishandi; Steven William; Alessia Cestaro
- Distributed by: Mitra Pictures dan Bic Productions
- Release date: October 29, 2009
- Running time: 80 minutes
- Country: Indonesia
- Language: Indonesian

Putih Abu-Abu dan Sepatu Kets is an Indonesian drama film released on October 29, 2009, directed by Nayato Fio Nuala and produced by Firman Bintang. It starring by Arumi Bachsin, Adipati Koesmadji, Michella Putri, Rendy Septino, Rana Audi Marissa, Fildha Elishandi, and Steven William.
