= I Know When You Die =

- Theatrical release poster
- Directed by: Hadrah Daeng Ratu
- Screenplay by: Aviv Elham
- Based on: Aku Tahu Kapan Kamu Mati by Arumi E (Wattpad novel)
- Produced by: Oswin Bonifanz
- Starring: Natasha Wilona; Ria Ricis; Al Ghazali Kohler; Fitria Rasyidi; Ryma Gembala; Sonia Alexa
- Cinematography: Asep Kalila
- Edited by: Firdauzi Trizkiyanto
- Music by: Joseph S. Djafar
- Production companies: Unlimited Production; Maxima Pictures
- Distributed by: GSC Movies; MM2 Entertainment; Disney+ Hotstar
- Release date: March 5, 2020 (Indonesia)
- Running time: 94 minutes
- Country: Indonesia
- Language: Indonesian
- Box office: Rp 21 billion

I Know When You Die (Indonesian: Aku Tahu Kapan Kamu Mati) is a 2020 Indonesian horror film directed by Hadrah Daeng Ratu and produced by Unlimited Production and Maxima Pictures. The film is adapted from a popular Wattpad novel by Arumi E and stars Natasha Wilona as Siena, a high school student who, after a near-fatal accident, gains the supernatural ability to see a ghostly figure appear near anyone about to die. Ria Ricis and Al Ghazali appear in supporting roles. It was released in Indonesian cinemas on 5 March 2020 and grossed approximately Rp 21 billion.

== Plot ==
Siena, a high school student, gains the supernatural ability to see death omens—manifesting as ghostly figures—following a near-death experience. Her abilities are validated after she witnesses the deaths of a classmate and her neighbor. While her classmates Flo, Neni, and Vina are initially skeptical of her claims, they are convinced after witnessing the sudden death of another student, Brama, in a traffic accident. Soon after, Siena spots the ghost of Flo's deceased younger sister hovering near the group, signaling Flo's impending demise. In an attempt to alter her fate, the friends seek help from a local shaman, who provides them with protective consecrated water. However, an altercation with Brama’s vengeful ex-girlfriend, Denisa, results in the bottle being destroyed. During the scuffle, Flo falls down a flight of stairs and is hospitalized with critical injuries. Seeking a solution, Siena consults a blind woman who suffered from the same curse and warns her that death is an unavoidable destiny. Returning to the hospital, Siena finds that Flo has succumbed to her injuries, forcing her to accept the tragic reality of her visions.

== Cast ==
- Natasha Wilona as Siena
- Ria Ricis as Flo
- Al Ghazali Kohler as Brama
- Fitria Rasyidi as Neni
- Ryma Gembala as Vina
- Sonia Alexa as Denisa
- Elizabeth Christine Skinner as Meta
- Adinda Halona as Firly
- Rita Nurmaliza as Fiona
- Kevin Torsten as Diego
- Anastasia Adamova as Naomi
- Ika Karisma as Aini
- Mahdika Wijiya as the Red Kuntilanak (ghost)
- Jeremy Zefanya Tjandra as Marvel
- Fellysha Beyonce as Flo's younger sister (ghost)
- Moses Amadeus as Somad's child (ghost)
- Qotrunnada Fajrina Achmad as Sari
- Asri Welas as Badriah
- Opie Kumis as Saidi
- Daus Separo as Asrul
- Aditya Warman as Somad
- Shelly Febrianti as Mrs Somad
- Amank Linggos as Samsul
- Muthia Datau as Suri
- Fuad Idris as the shaman
- Teuku Rais as Flo's father
- Elvita Sambuaga as Flo's mother

== Reception ==
A mixed review by Marcus Goh, for Yahoo news, criticized the quality of the photography but praised some actors’ performances. A very negative review for the French website DarkSideReviews.com, however, found the overall production unserious, the story boring and the portrayal of lead and secondary roles execrable.

== Sequel ==
A sequel titled Aku Tahu Kapan Kamu Mati: Desa Bunuh Diri (English: I Know When You Dead: Suicide Village) was released in Indonesia on 14 September 2023. The film, again, stars Natasha Wilona as Siena, alongside Marsha Aruan, Giulio Parengkuan, Acha Septriasa, and Ratu Felisha. A review at Brilio.id found the sequel to be an improvement compared to the first part.
