= Yati Octavia =

Indonesian actress (born 1954)

- Born: 20 October 1954 (age 71); Jakarta, Indonesia
- Occupation: Actress
- Years active: 1972-present
- Children: 4 sons

Yati Octavia (born 20 October 1954 in Jakarta, Indonesia) is an Indonesian actress. She mainly plays in dramas and romantic films.

Yati is married and has four sons, one from a previous marriage.

She started her film career at a very young age. One of Yati's earliest roles was Brandal – Brandal Metropolitan. In 1977 she played in the movies Akibat Pergaulan Bebas and Ali Topan Anak Jalanan. Yati was one of the best-paid actresses of her time, earning Rp5 million.

== Filmography ==
- Noda dan Asmara
- Cinta Putih
- Pengalaman Pertama
- Akibat Bercinta
- Aula Cinta
- Roda roda Gila
- Sentuhan Cinta
- Widuri Kekasihku
- Rintihan Gadis Buta
- Rahasia Perkawinan
- Akibat Godaan
- Gadis Simpanan
- Gara gara Istri Muda
- Dari Mata Turun Ke Hati
- Benci Tapi Rindu
- Perjalanan Cinta
- Oma Irama Gitar Tua
- Oma Irama "Begadang"
- Oma Irama "Berkelana"
- Oma Irama "Penasaran"
- Darah Muda
- Pengorbanan
- Hamidah
- Cinta Fitri (film) 1–6 as Fitri Rahayu
- Cintaku Dikampus Biru
- Rahasia Perawan
- Intan Perawan Kubu
- Sidoel Anak Modern
- Cinta di Ujung Sajadah
