= Anak Jalanan: A New Beginning =

Indonesian action television series

- Genre: Romance
- Screenplay by: Aviv Elham
- Directed by: Rudi Aryanto
- Starring: Irsyadillah; Ersya Aurelia; Cemal Faruk; Dea Annisa
- Theme music composer: Dewa 19
- Opening theme: "Cinta Gila" by Dewa 19
- Ending theme: "Cinta Gila" by Dewa 19
- Composer: Joseph S. Djafar
- Country of origin: Indonesia
- Original language: Indonesian
- No. of seasons: 1
- No. of episodes: 477

Production
- Producers: Muhammad Ramdani; M. Abul Laits (Eps. 1—122)
- Cinematography: Denny Gompal
- Editor: Elang Team
- Camera setup: Multi-camera
- Running time: 52-96 minutes
- Production company: MNC Pictures

Original release
- Network: GTV
- Release: 13 December 2021 – 29 November 2022

Related
- Anak Jalanan

Anak Jalanan: A New Beginning is an Indonesian television series produced by MNC Pictures. It premiered on 13 December 2021 on GTV. The series is a reboot of the RCTI show Anak Jalanan. It stars Anrez Adelio, Ersya Aurelia, Cemal Faruk, and Dea Annisa. The show last aired on 30 November 2022.

== Synopsis ==
Boy is a young member of a motorcycle gang who falls in love with a girl named Reva. He believes his relationship with her can change his life for the better.

== Main cast and characters ==
- Anrez Adelio as "Boy"
- Ersya Aurelia as Revalina "Reva" Amara
- Cemal Faruk as Marvel Rivano
- Dea Annisa as Amanda Clarissa

== Casting ==
Anrez Adelio held the role of Boy since the series launched in December 2021, but quit in August 2022.

== Soundtrack ==
Title	Artist	Lyrics	Label
"Cinta Gila"	Dewa 19	Ahmad Dhani	Aquarius Musikindo
"Tak Lagi Rindu"	Melisa Hartanto	Tintin, Indah Anastasya, Aldi Fachrobby	Hits Records
"Kamu Anggap Apa"	Ghea Indrawari		Hits Records

Theme song
