= Stefan William =

Indonesian actor and singer (born 1993)

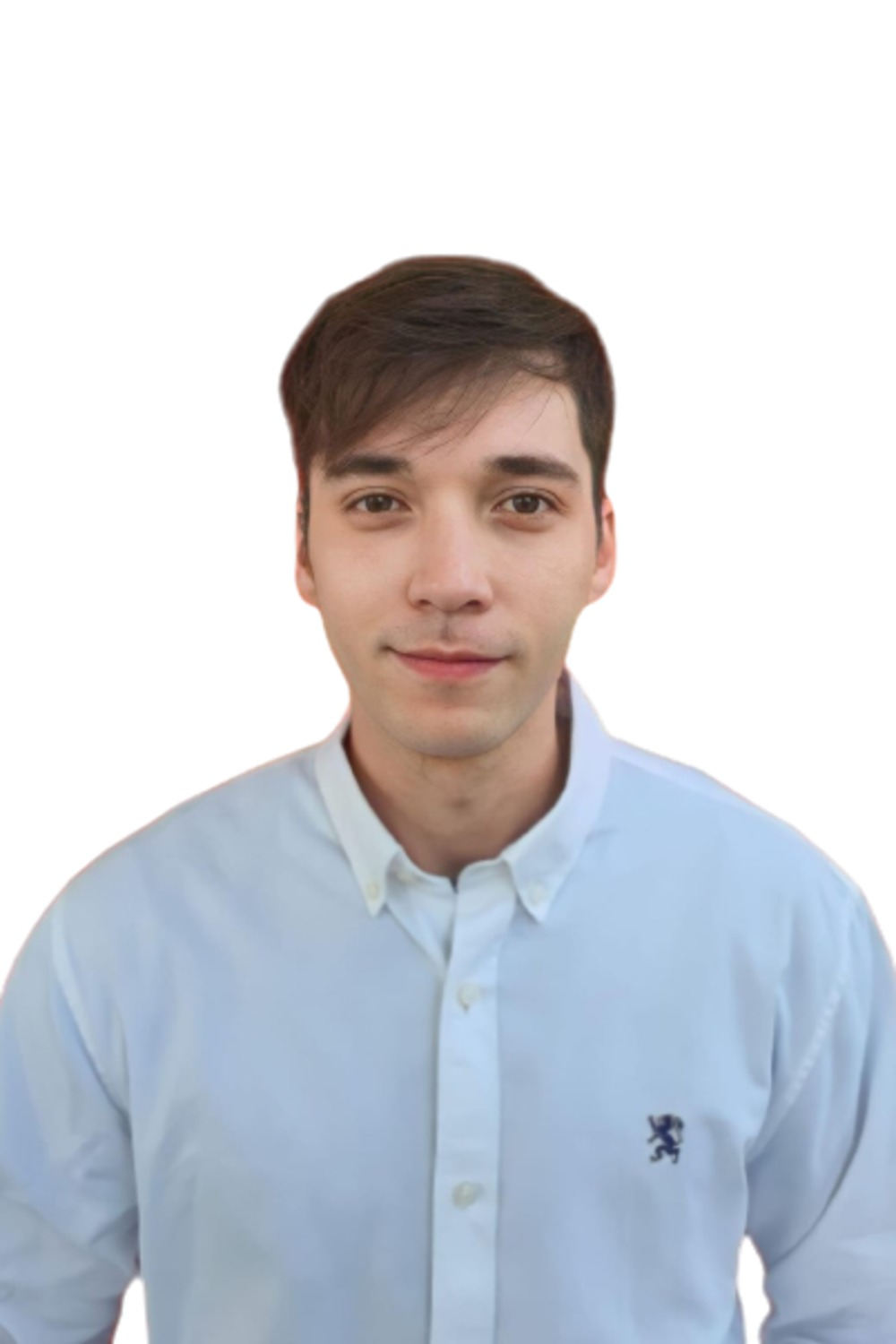
- William in 2023
- Born: Stefan William Umboh; 11 August 1993 (age 32); California, United States
- Occupations: Actor; singer
- Known for: Anak Jalanan, Anak Langit
- Spouse: Celine Evangelista (m. 2016; div. 2021)

Steven William Umboh, also known as Steven William or Stefan William (born 11 August 1993), is an Indonesian actor and singer. He is known for his roles in the soap operas Anak Jalanan and Anak Langit as well as the film Bestfriend? William is the vocalist of the Indonesian band the Junas Monkey (later shortened to the Junas), with whom he has released several singles and one EP. He was married to actress and singer Celine Evangelista from 2016 until 2021.

== Biography ==
=== Personal life ===
Umboh was born in the United States and moved to Indonesia at the age of six. He is the grandson of Indonesian director Wim Umboh. William married actress and singer Celine Evangelista on 10 November 2016. The couple divorced in 2021.

=== Career ===
William made a name for himself on Indonesian screens with roles in the soap operas Anak Jalanan, Boy, and Anak Langit. He has also appeared in several feature films, including Bestfriend? (2008) and Putih Abu-Abu dan Sepatu Kets (2009).

In 2011, William began singing with the band The Junas Monkey, which also included actors Ajun Perwira on guitar, Aditya Suryo on drums, and Bobie Antonio on bass. They released several singles and a self-titled EP, before going on an extended hiatus. In 2020, The Junas Monkey made a comeback under the shortened name The Junas.

== Filmography ==
List of film/television appearances, with year, title, and role shown
Year	Title	Role	Notes
2006–2016	Anak Jalanan	Boy Wirawan	
2008	Bestfriend?	Ditya	Feature film
2009	Putih Abu-Abu dan Sepatu Kets	Don	Feature film
2011	Gol-Gol Fatimah	Ridho	
2017	Boy	Boy	
2017–2020	Anak Langit	Hiro	
2020	Anak Band	Gilang	
2021	Badai Pasti Berlalu	Leo Pratama / Reihan	
2022	Aku Jatuh Cinta	Kevin Jayadiningrat	
2024	Jangan Salahkan Aku Selingkuh	Reyhan Sanjaya	
2025	Cinta di Ujung Sajadah	Indra	
2025—2026	Melindungimu Selamanya	Galang	
TBA	Bunga di Tepi Jurang	Maxwell	

== The Junas Monkey discography ==
EPs

- The Junas Monkey (2012)

Singles

- "Jadian" (2011)
- "Ikut Aku" (feat. Icha Anisa, 2012)
- "Karena Cinta" (2018)
- "Cukup Dikenang Saja" (feat. Yasmin Napper, 2020)
- "I Love You Baby" (2020)

== Awards and nominations ==
Year	Award	Nominated works	Category	Results
2011	SCTV Awards 2011	Gol-Gol Fatimah	Aktor Utama Ngetop	Won
2016	Indonesian Kids Choice Awards 2016	Anak Jalanan	Aktor Favorit	Won
2016	Dahsyatnya Awards 2016	Anak Jalanan	Pasangan Terdahsyat (With Natasha Wilona)	Won
2016	Indonesian Television Awards 2016	Anak Jalanan	Aktor Terpopuler	Nominated
2016	Panasonic Gobel Awards 2016	Anak Jalanan	Aktor Terfavorit	Nominated
2017	Indonesian Television Awards 2017	Boy	Aktor Terpopuler	Nominated
2017	Panasonic Gobel Awards 2017	Anak Langit	Aktor Terfavorit	Nominated
2017	SCTV Awards 2017	Anak Langit	Aktor Utama Paling Ngetop	Nominated
2018	Panasonic Gobel Awards 2018	Anak Langit	Aktor Terfavorit	Nominated
2018	SCTV Awards 2018	Anak Langit	Aktor Utama Paling Ngetop	Won
2019	Panasonic Gobel Awards 2019	Anak Langit	Aktor Terfavorit	Nominated
2019	SCTV Awards 2019	Anak Langit	Aktor Utama Paling Ngetop	Won
2020	SCTV Awards 2020	Anak Band	Aktor Utama Paling Ngetop	Nominated
2020	SCTV Awards 2020	—	Artis Paling Sosmed	Nominated
2021	Infotainment Awards 2021	Badai Pasti Berlalu	Best Male Character (Leo)	Pending
2021	Infotainment Awards 2021	—	Most Charming Male Celebrity	Pending
2021	Infotainment Awards 2021	—	Gorgeous Dad	Pending
2021	Indonesian Drama Series Awards 2021	Anak Band	Pasangan Drama Series Terfavorit (With Natasha Wilona)	Pending
