= Heart 2 Heart (film) =

2010 Indonesian film directed by Nayato Fio Nuala

- Film poster
- Directed by: Nayato Fio Nuala
- Screenplay by: Tittien Watimena
- Produced by: Chand Parvez Servia
- Starring: Irish Bella; Aliff Ali; Indah Permatasari; Argatama Levy; Wulan Guritno; Arumi Bachsin; Miradz; George Taka
- Cinematography: Freddy A. Lingga
- Edited by: Tiara Puspa Rani
- Music by: Anto Hoed; Melly Goeslaw (scores); Melly Goeslaw (songs)
- Production company: Starvision Plus
- Distributed by: Starvision Plus
- Release date: November 11, 2010
- Running time: 91 minutes
- Country: Indonesia
- Language: Indonesian

Heart 2 Heart is a 2010 Indonesian drama film written by Tittien Watimena and directed by Nayato Fio Nuala with stars Irish Bella, Aliff Ali, Arumi Bachsin, Wulan Guritno, Indah Permatasari, Argatama Levi, and Miradz.

== Plot ==
Starting with an accidental meeting at a lake, Pandu (Aliff Ali) and Indah (Irish Bella) find happiness in the beautiful forests, tea gardens, and lakes of Bogor. Finally, Indah's family vacation ends, and she returns to Jakarta. They are reunited, but some obstacles still exist in the form of Indah's boyfriend, chosen by her mother (Wulan Guritno). Then a tragic accident occurs that changes Indah's life as she can no longer see or speak, and her sister returns to help take care of her. Feeling lost and hopeless, Indah goes into solitude. Pandu, searching for his love, leaves school and attempts to return Indah's smile to her face. It is there at the lake where they first met that they reunite.

== Cast ==
- Aliff Alli as Pandu
- Arumy Bachsin as Clara (as Arumi Bachsin)
- Irish Bella as Indah
- Wulan Guritno as Ibu Indah
- Argatama Levy as Dimas
- Miradz as Ramon
- Indah Permatasari as Gita
- George Taka
