= Melindungimu Selamanya =

Indonesian television series

- Genre: Drama; Romantic
- Written by: Baskoro Adi Wuryanto; Dharma Putra PN
- Story by: Oka Aurora
- Directed by: Fajar Nugros
- Starring: Marshanda; Stefan William; Arya Vasco; Pangeran Lantang; Naura Hakim; Umar Lubis; Zora Vidyanata
- Country of origin: Indonesia
- Original language: Indonesian
- No. of seasons: 1
- No. of episodes: 8

Production
- Executive producers: Sophia Louisa; Jeff Han; Juan Xiang; Febriamy Hutapea
- Producer: Susanti Dewi
- Editors: Rozy Anwar; Johan Leonardo; Andhy Pulung
- Camera setup: Multi-camera
- Production company: SL23 Studio

Original release
- Network: WeTV
- Release: 26 December 2025 – 14 February 2026

Melindungimu Selamanya is an Indonesian television series produced by SL23 Studio that aired on 26 December 2025 on WeTV. It starred Marshanda, and Stefan William.

== Plot ==
Nadia and Galang, two different souls united by a promise of loyalty. That promise of loyalty was to always look after each other. However, time and pain separated the feelings they had held since high school. Unexpectedly, 16 years later, Nadia and Galang meet again under different circumstances.

Nadia's life is in danger. Galang refuses to lose their second chance. Amidst secrets, betrayal, and constant danger, he strives to protect Nadia.

Galang wants to prove that the promise to protect her forever has never left his heart. So what will happen to Galang and Nadia's relationship and promise of loyalty?

== Cast ==
- Marshanda as Nadia Prayogo
- Stefan William as Galang
- Arya Vasco as Timothy
- Pangeran Lantang as Niko
- Naura Hakim as Ilona
- Marcell Darwin as Kevin
- Umar Lubis as Prayogo
- Rowiena Umboh as Melanie
- Arnold Kobogau as Frans
- Devina Aureel as Astrid
- Adi Sudirja as Boni
- Melly Saripah as Mbok Darmi
- Andy William as Madun/Tian
- Attala as Dadang
- Shalima Hakim as Janice
- Pamela Sidarta as Saras
- Zora Vidyanata as Wulan

== Production ==
=== Release ===
The series was released on 26 December 2025.

=== Casting ===
Marshanda was confirmed to play female lead, Nadia. Stefan William has been offered the male lead, Galang.
