= Ada Apa Dengan Cinta? the Series =

2003 Indonesian TV series

- Genre: Drama; Teen
- Based on: Ada Apa Dengan Cinta? film by Miles Films
- Starring: Ririn Dwi Ariyanti; Nadia Saphira
- Theme music composer: Anto Hoed (Note: Uncredited); Melly Goeslaw
- Opening theme: "Ku Bahagia" — Melly Goeslaw
- Ending theme: "Ada Apa dengan Cinta?" — Melly Goeslaw
- Composer: Mufti A.B.
- Country of origin: Indonesia
- Original language: Indonesian

Production
- Running time: 60 minutes
- Production company: SinemArt

Original release
- Network: RCTI
- Release: December 7, 2003 – July 10, 2005

Related
- Ada Apa dengan Cinta?

Ada Apa Dengan Cinta? the Series (English: "What's Up with Love? the Series" or "What's Up with Cinta? the Series") is an Indonesian soap opera produced by SinemArt that premiered December 7, 2003, to July 10, 2005, on RCTI based on the movie of the same name. It was directed by Indrayanto Kurniawan and starred Ririn Dwi Ariyanti.

== Plot ==
One day, Rangga finally came home. Cinta realized that her closeness with Taura was just an escape. In addition to the story of Cinta and Rangga, Maura, Milly, Carmen, Alya and even Memet also experience colorful love journeys.

== Casts ==
- Ririn Dwi Ariyanti as Cinta
- Nadia Saphira as Milly

== See also ==
- Ada Apa Dengan Cinta? 1
- Ada Apa Dengan Cinta? 2
