= Cinta di Ujung Sajadah =

Indonesian drama television series

- Genre: Drama; Romantic; Religious
- Based on: Cinta di Ujung Sajadah by Asma Nadia
- Screenplay by: Serena Luna
- Story by: Sunjoy Shekhar
- Directed by: Anurag Vaishnav
- Starring: Cut Syifa; Eza Gionino; Zikri Daulay; Andri Mashadi; Tsania Marwa; Yati Octavia; Cahya Kamila; Minati Atmanagara; Gemi Nastiti; Stefan William; Andi Annisa; Yessi Kenyang; Fajar Rezky; Achmad Megantara; Adinda Azani; Teuku Ryan; Pangky Suwito; Djihan Ranti; Boy Tirayoh; Ivanka Suwandi; Deden Bagaskara
- Theme music composer: Asma Nadia; Ryan Pitna
- Opening theme: "Cinta di Ujung Sajadah" by Indah Dewi Pertiwi
- Ending theme: "Cinta di Ujung Sajadah" by Indah Dewi Pertiwi
- Composer: Laurensius Steven
- Country of origin: Indonesia
- Original language: Indonesian
- No. of seasons: 1
- No. of episodes: 94

Production
- Executive producer: David S. Suwarto
- Producer: Sridhar Jetty
- Cinematography: Zeta Alfa Maphilindo
- Editor: Team Essjay
- Camera setup: Multi-camera
- Running time: 90 minutes
- Production companies: SinemArt; Ess Jay Studios

Original release
- Network: SCTV; Vidio
- Release: 26 February – 1 June 2025

Cinta di Ujung Sajadah is an Indonesian television drama series that premiered on 26 February 2025 on SCTV and streams digitally on Vidio. Based on the novel of the same title by Asma Nadia. Produced by Essjay Studios and starring Cut Syifa, Eza Gionino, and Zikri Daulay.

== Plot ==
Rindu and Fauzan's marriage was destroyed when Fauzan misunderstood that Rindu had worked as a prostitute based on false accusations from Denny—a man who held a grudge because Rindu rejected his love. In fact, Rindu only worked at a karaoke as a waitress to support her sick sister. An angry Fauzan finally kicked Rindu out of the house. While Rindu fought for custody of her child, Fauzan chose to remarry Alia. On the other hand, Rindu met Hafiz again who sincerely loved her.

== Cast ==
- Cut Syifa as Rindu Jasmine
- Eza Gionino as Adi Saputra
- Zikri Daulay as Fauzan Irwandi
- Stefan William as Indra
- Andri Mashadi as Denny
- Tsania Marwa as Alia Sari
- Yati Octavia as Aminah
- Cahya Kamila as Selly
- Minati Atmanagara as Ratih
- Gemi Nastiti as Carla
- Rafan Nizzar as Adil Nugraha
- Gilang Rama as Yanto
- Deden Bagaskara as ayah Adil
- Andi Annisa as Aminah
- Sheza Lubis as Cantika Zahra
- Keysha Angelique as Anggun
- Raya Nurcintya as Ayu
- Yessi Kenyang as Yuni
- Devi Ginong as Mimin
- Sari Arboyo as Inah
- Fajar Rezky as Reza
- Rani Adipura as Eva
- Achmad Megantara as Hafiz Abdullah
- Adinda Azani as Laura Faradiba
- Teuku Ryan as Fero
- Pangky Suwito as Yanto
- Djihan Ranti as Maya
- Boy Tirayoh as Wijanarko
- Ivanka Suwandi as Widya
- Sylvia Menul as Sakinah

== Production ==
=== Casting ===
Cut Syifa was selected to portray the female lead of Rindu. Achmad Megantara was cast the male lead as Hafiz. In April 2025, Megantara who known as Hafiz quit the show and was replaced by Eza Gionino as Adi.
