= The Musical Journey of Dwiki Dharmawan =

2025 concert by Dwiki Dharmawan

- Concert by Dwiki Dharmawan
- Orchestra: World Peace Orchestra
- Choir: Kilau Vokalia Dian Didaktika
- Venue: Ciputra Artpreneur Theatre, Lotte Mall, South Jakarta
- Date: 23 August 2025
- No. of shows: 1
- Producer: Prestige Promotions

Dwiki Dharmawan concert chronology
- Parikrama Parahyangan (2025); The Musical Journey of Dwiki Dharmawan (2025)

The Musical Journey of Dwiki Dharmawan was the concert by the Indonesian musician, songwriter and record producer Dwiki Dharmawan. Marketed as a concert to celebrate ruby anniversary of Dwiki's career, it was hosted by presenters James Purba and Shinta Syamsul Arief and commenced on 23 August 2025 at the Ciputra Artpreneur Theatre, Lotte Mall Jakarta. This was the second concert to celebrate said anniversary of Dwiki's career, after Parikrama Parahyangan, which took place in Bandung three months prior.

== Background ==
Originally, Dwiki planned to hold a special concert to celebrate his silver anniversary of career in 2010, but was halted. It was also reported that he planned to have his career's pearl anniversary special concert in 2015, but was also cancelled. Dwiki stated that the concert is "not just a time, but also a journey, collaboration, and his love of Indonesian music". During the second press conference, Kris Dayanti stated that she will perform two then-unknown songs, which were confirmed to be "Cita Pasti" and "You'll Be in My Heart". Dwiki's wife, Ita Purnamasari, stated that the pop rock-styled soundtrack from the 1990s Indonesian television series will appear in the concert's set list, which was confirmed to be "Deru Debu".

== Supporting acts ==
The Musical Journey of Dwiki Dharmawan included supporting acts such as Sandhy Sondoro, Ruth Sahanaya, Ita Purnamasari, Once Mekel, Andien and Dira Sugandi, along with young talents Putri Ariani, Dirly, Ivan Paulus, Jinan Laetitia, Shanna Shannon and Awdella. Krakatau, Kamal Musallam, Iskandar Widjaja, the Papuan hip-hop group Musik Anak Coment, the World Peace Orchestra, Kilau Vokalia Dian Didaktika Children's Choir, and Deepro Dancers also appear as special performers.

== Presenters ==
- James Purba
- Shinta Syamsul Arief

== Set list ==
1. "Gemilang" (performed by Sandhy Sondoro and Andien)
2. "Malam Biru" (performed by Sandhy Sondoro and Andien)
3. "Hati Seluas Samudra" (performed by Andien with Ivan Paulus)
4. "Tiada Lagi Keraguan" (performed by Awdella)
5. "Aku Ingin" (performed by Awdella)
6. Medley: "Cintaku Yang Terakhir" / "Bidadari Yang Terluka" (performed by Shanna Shannon)
7. "Dengan Menyebut Nama Allah" (performed by Jinan Laetitia)
8. "Melati Dari Jayagiri" (performed by Iskandar Widjaja)
9. "Sepasang Mata Bola" (performed by Iskandar Widjaja)
10. "The Spirit of Peace"
11. "Cuma Saya" (performed by M.A.C.)
12. "Lamalera's Dream" (performed by Dira Sugandi)
13. "Ie" (performed by Dira Sugandi)
14. "Bridge over Troubled Water" (performed by Dira Sugandi)
15. "Cita Pasti" (performed by Krisdayanti)
16. "You'll Be in My Heart" (performed by Krisdayanti)
17. "Melangkah Di Atas Awan" (performed by Dirly Dave)
18. "Deru Debu" (performed by Dirly Dave and Ita Purnamasari)
19. "Cintaku Padamu" (performed by Ita Purnamasari with Dwiki and Fernanda Dharmawan)
20. "Imaji" (performed by Ruth Sahanaya)
21. "Here, There and Everywhere" (performed by Ruth Sahanaya)
22. "I Left My Heart in San Francisco" (performed by Tony Wenas)
23. "Over the Rainbow" (performed by Putri Ariani)
24. "Perfect Liar" (performed by Putri Ariani)
25. "Haiti" (performed by Krakatau)
26. "Terumbu Menangis" (performed by Krakatau)
27. "Cerita Persahabatan" (performed by Krakatau)
28. "Kau Datang" (performed by Krakatau)
29. "Aku Mau" (performed by Once Mekel)
30. "Menaklukkan Dunia" (performed by Once, Awdella and Shannon)

Encore

31. "Sekitar Kita"
