= Muthia Datau =

Indonesian actress and former footballer

- Born: Mutiara Datau; 12 August 1959 (age 67); Bandar Lampung, Lampung, Indonesia
- Occupations: Actress, model, former footballer
- Years active: 1977–present
- Spouse: Herman Felani
- Children: 3
Association football career
- Position: Goalkeeper
Senior career*
Years	Team	Apps	(Gls)
–1985	Buana Putri		
International career
1977–1980	Indonesia	12	(0)
- * Club domestic league appearances and goals

Muthia Datau (born 12 August 1959), also known as Mutia Datau, is an Indonesian actress, model and former football player. Before pursuing a career in entertainment, she played as a goalkeeper for Jakarta-based women's football club Buana Putri and the Indonesia women's national football team. She became involved in football as a teenager and was part of the national team from 1977. She retired from playing for Buana Putri in 1985.

Datau also pursued a career in Indonesian cinema, appearing in films including Sepasang Merpati (1979), Malu-Malu Kucing (1980), Sirkuit Kemelut (1980), and Intan Mendulang Cinta (1981).

== Early life ==
Datau was born on 12 August 1959 in Bandar Lampung, Lampung, Indonesia. She became interested in football during her teenage years and joined Buana Putri, a women's football club based in Jakarta.

== Football career ==
=== Buana Putri ===
Datau began playing football as a teenager with Buana Putri, one of the prominent women's football clubs in Indonesia during the 1970s and 1980s. She played as a goalkeeper and became one of the club's key players. At a time when women's football had limited formal competition opportunities in Indonesia, Buana Putri participated in exhibitions and tournaments that helped maintain the visibility of the women's game.

Datau continued playing for Buana Putri until 1985, when she retired from the sport. Her time with the club formed the foundation of her reputation as a prominent goalkeeper in Indonesian women's football.

=== Indonesia women's national team ===
Datau's performances at club level led to her selection for the Indonesia women's national football team. She became a mainstay in goal for the national side from 1977, representing Indonesia during a formative period for women's international football in the country.

She was associated with Indonesia's participation in the 1977 women's Asian football championship in Taiwan. The tournament was an important early international competition for women's national teams in Asia. Historical accounts of Indonesian women's football have identified Datau as one of the notable goalkeepers of her era.

Datau's football career ended in 1985 when she retired from playing for Buana Putri. Her transition from competitive football to entertainment reflected the experiences of some Indonesian women footballers of the period, when opportunities for a sustained professional playing career were limited.

=== Later involvement in women's football ===
After spending years working outside football, Datau returned to the sport as an advocate for women's football. In 2017–2018, she was reported as serving on the business committee of the Indonesian women's football association, contributing to efforts to support the development of the women's game.

== Acting career ==
Alongside football, Datau developed a career in entertainment. She began working as a model in the late 1970s and entered film acting in 1979. In interviews with *Historia*, she recalled that her first feature film was Sepasang Merpati (1979), after which she appeared in several other Indonesian films.

Her early film credits included Ira Maya dan Kakek Ateng (1979), Malu-Malu Kucing (1980), Sirkuit Kemelut (1980), and Intan Mendulang Cinta (1981). She also appeared in Tapak-tapak Kaki Wolter Monginsidi (1983).

Datau later returned to screen acting after a lengthy break. Her subsequent film credits included Kita Versus Korupsi (2012), Syaikh Abubakar (2017), Titisan Setan (2018), Denting Kematian (2020), Aku Tahu Kapan Kamu Mati (2020), Mengejar Surga (2022), and Balada Si Roy (2023).

== Personal life ==
Datau married Indonesian actor Herman Felani in 1985. The couple have three children. Datau's work outside football included employment in the banking sector before she returned to public attention through her later involvement in women's football and acting.

== Filmography ==
=== Film ===
Selected filmography
Year	Title	Notes
1979	Sepasang Merpati	Her feature-film debut
1979	Ira Maya dan Kakek Ateng	
1980	Malu-Malu Kucing	
1980	Sirkuit Kemelut	
1981	Intan Mendulang Cinta	
1983	Tapak-tapak Kaki Wolter Monginsidi	
2012	Kita Versus Korupsi	Segment: "Selamat Siang, Risa!"
2017	Syaikh Abubakar	
2018	Titisan Setan	
2020	Aku Tahu Kapan Kamu Mati	
2020	Denting Kematian	
2022	Mengejar Surga	
2023	Balada Si Roy	
2025	Panggilan dari Kubur	

=== Television ===
Selected filmography
Year	Title	Notes
2022–2023	Cinta Setelah Cinta	
2023–2024	Bidadari Surgamu	

== See also ==
- Indonesia women's national football team
- Women's football in Indonesia
