= Ririn Dwi Ariyanti =

Indonesian actress

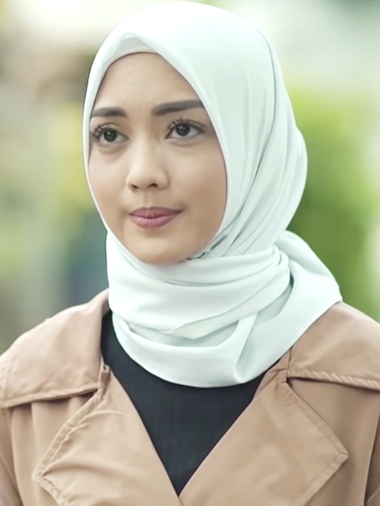
- Born: Ririn Dwi Ariyanti Noto; November 6, 1985 (age 40); Malang, East Java, Indonesia
- Other name: Ririn
- Occupations: Actress; presenter; model
- Years active: 2001–present
- Spouse: Aldi Bragi (m. 2010; div. 2022)
- Children: 3
- Parent(s): Sudirman Riantonoto; Amelia Rustanti

Ririn Dwi Ariyanti Noto, known as Ririn Dwi Ariyanti (born November 6, 1985) is an Indonesian actress. She made her soap opera debut with Ada Apa dengan Cinta? by Sinemart that aired on RCTI, an Indonesian TV network.

== Career ==
Ririn began her career as an actress in RCTI. She has since worked in SinemArt's soap operas, such as Ada Apa dengan Cinta? The Series, Cinta Kembar, Putri Kembar and many others. She gained popularity for her role as Cinta on Ada Apa dengan Cinta?

== Personal life ==
Ririn Dwi Ariyanti was born on November 6, 1985, in Malang, East Java, to Sudirman Riantonoto and Amelia Rustanti. She is a graduate of Paramadina University. She married Aldi Bragi on July 11, 2010, at the Crown Plaza Hotel. They have three children. On February 10, 2022, Ririn officially divorced her husband.

== Filmography ==
=== Soap operas ===
- Percikan (English: "Splash")
- Ada Apa dengan Cinta? The Series (English: "What's in Love? The Series")
- Manusia Bodoh (English: "Foolish Man")
- Pintu Hidayah (English: "The Door of Guidance")
- Maha Kasih (English: "Most Giving")
- Bukan Diriku (English: "Not Myself")
- Cincin (English: "Rings")
- Impian Cinderella (English: "Cinderella's Dreams")
- Bang Jagur (English: "Brother Jagur")
- Putri Kembar (English: "Twin Princess")
- Maha Cinta (English: "Great Love")
- Cinta Kembar (English: "Twin Love")
- Janji (English: "Promises")
- Cahaya (English: "The Light")
- Namaku Mentari (English: "My name is Mentari")
- Terlanjur Cinta (English: "Already in Love")
- Takdir Cinta (English: "Love Destiny")
- Sinar (English: "Rays")
- Hikmah Ilahi Tafakur (English: "Tafakur Divine Wisdom")
- Fathiyah (English: "Fathiyah")
- Bola Bolu (English: "Balloons")
- Anak-Anak Manusia (English: "Children of Humanity")
- Gerobak Cinta Wakwaw (English: "Wakwaw Love Wagon")
- Kesempurnaan Cinta (English: "The Perfection of Love")
- Pengabdi (English: "Resident")
- TV Movie episode Ustadz Kembar (English: "Movie TV" episode Twin Ustadz)
- Cinta yang Hilang (English: "The Lost Love")
- Dewi (English: "Dewi")
- Bukan Salah Cinta (English: "Not Love's Fault")
- Aku Ingin Dicintai (English: "I Want to Be Loved")
- Cinta untuk Bunda (English: "Love for Mom")
- Raden Kian Santang: Mahkota Baru Pajajaran (English: "Raden Kian Santang: The New Crown of Pajajaran")
- Cinta setelah Cinta (English: "Love after Love")

=== Television series ===
- Kamar Kita-Kita (2003)
- Let's Dance (2004 - 2005)
- Class News (2006 - 2007)
- Cermin Hati (2008 - 2009)

=== TV commercials ===
- LG Electronics Indonesia (2004-2008)
- Virtuv (2008-2009)
