= Belok Kanan Jalan Terus =

- Genre: Comedy; Religion
- Created by: Leo Sutanto; David S. Suwarto
- Screenplay by: Ahmad Madani; Andi Atthira
- Story by: Ahmad Madani; Andi Atthira
- Directed by: Agus Elias
- Starring: Cut Meyriska; Roger Danuarta; El Manik; Adipura; Edy Oglek; Benny Ruswandi; Sasha Alexa; Jennifer Eve; Wingky Harun; Gracia Marcilia; Dafina Jamasir
- Theme music composer: Charly van Houten
- Opening theme: "Belok Kanan Jalan Terus" by Charly van Houten feat Andi Soraya
- Ending theme: "Belok Kanan Jalan Terus" by Charly van Houten feat Andi Soraya
- Country of origin: Indonesia
- Original language: Indonesian
- No. of seasons: 1
- No. of episodes: 7

Production
- Executive producers: Leo Sutanto; David S. Suwarto
- Producers: Dani Sapawie; Lili Sunawati
- Camera setup: Multi camera
- Running time: 120 minutes
- Production company: SinemArt

Original release
- Network: Indosiar
- Release: 12 March – 18 March 2023

Belok Kanan Jalan Terus (English: Right Turn on the Way) is an Indonesian mini series is an Indonesian television series produced by SinemArt, which premiered on 12 March 2023 to 18 March 2023, on Indosiar. This mini series is directed by Agus Elias and starting Cut Meyriska, Roger Danuarta and El Manik.

== Synopsis ==
The soap opera is about people who are trying to turn their lives around. The cast includes a former thug who is trying to become a local leader, an artist who is trying to become a religious leader, and a shaman who now runs a food stand.

== Cast ==
- Cut Meyriska as Sekar
- Roger Danuarta as Bara
- Adipura as Ustaz Robert
- Giovanni Tobing as Dorman
- El Manik as Abdullah/Win
- Edy Oglek as Sugih
- Benny Ruswandi as Jay
- Sasha Alexa as Ayati
- Jennifer Eve as Fiona
- Wingky Harun as Urip
- Renny Novita as Yanah
- Gracia Marcilia as Sekar's friend
- Jasmine Elfira as Arum
- Nabila Zavira as Shinta
- Rasyid Karim as Sekar's father
- Dafina Jamasir as Dr. Kinan
- Sissy Syahwards as Romlah
- Buyung Malin Malelo as Udin
- Sabar bin Bokir as Supri
