= Jawara (TV series) =

Indonesian soap opera

- Genre: Musical Comedy Drama
- Created by: SinemArt
- Written by: Imam Tantowi
- Directed by: M.T. Risyaf
- Starring: Ben Kasyafani; Kenang Mirdad; Irish Bella; Rama Michael; Aura Nabila; Kevin Kambey; Temon; Tempo Salvatore; Wina Zulfiana; Valeria Stahl Kaliey; Dini Vitri; Reymon Knuliqh; Royhan Hidayat; Burhanudin; Gilang Rino; Cici Tegal; Denaya Bintang Azmi; Aswin Fabanyo
- Theme music composer: Wali
- Opening theme: Wali, Abatasa
- Ending theme: Wali, Abatasa
- Country of origin: Indonesia
- Original language: Indonesian
- No. of seasons: 1
- No. of episodes: 30

Production
- Executive producer: Ely Yanti Noor
- Producer: Leo Sutanto
- Production locations: Jakarta, Indonesia
- Running time: One hour (02:45-03:45am Indonesia West Time)
- Production company: SinemArt

Original release
- Network: RCTI
- Release: June 6 – July 5, 2016

Jawara is an Indonesian soap opera, produced by SinemArt. It was first aired on RCTI on June 6, 2016.

== Cast ==
- Ben Kasyafani as Encep
- Kenang Mirdad as Ading
- Irish Bella as Annisa
- Rama Michael as Fadil
- Aura Nabilla as Zinni Kasya
- Kevin Kambey as Oman
- Temon as Satibi
- Selvo Salvatore as Aki Bashir
- Wina Zulfiana as Halimah
- Valeria Stahl Kaliey as Hidayati
- Dini Vitri as Hidayati's mother
- Reymon Knuliqh as Musa
- Royhan Hidayat as Rojak
- Burhanudin as Annisa's father
- Gilang Rino as Sukirman
- Cici Tegal as Satibi's wife
- Denaya Bintang Azmi as Annisa's mother
- Aswin Fabanyo as Fadil's father
- Tri Apriningtyas as Fadil's mother
- Annika Hakim as Nyai Sariti
- Firda Indira as Nyimas Nur
- Faris Nahdi as Farris
- Eddie Riwanto as Edi
