= Irish Bella =

Indonesian actress

- Born: Yris Jetty Dirk de Beule; 23 April 1996 (age 30); Cirebon, Indonesia
- Other name: Irish Bella
- Occupations: Actress; model; singer
- Years active: 2009—present

Yris Jetty Dirk de Beule (born April 23, 1996), better known professionally as Irish Bella, is an Indonesian actress, model, and singer. She is best known for her roles in the Indonesian films Love in Perth (2010), and Heart 2 Heart (2010), and the soap operas Jawara, Jakarta Love Story, Rajawali, and Binar Bening Berlian. She was nominated at the Indonesian Movie Actors Awards in 2017.

== Career ==
Bella started her career in the entertainment world by joining a modelling agency in Bandung. After that, she was contracted by MD Entertainment to play a role in the Tangisan Issabela series which aired in 2009. She had a role in the television programme Tiger Boy, which involved live stunts with animals. After taking a sabbatical from acting, Bella returned to acting in films, this time along with her husband in 2022. In addition to her acting, she also hosts a chat programme on a YouTube channel.

== Personal life ==
Bella was born to a Belgian father, Johan de Beule and an Indonesian mother, Susanti Arifin. She started a relationship with Ammar Zoni while filming the soap opera Cinta Suci. The relationship progressed to an engagement on 12 February 2019, and then to marriage on 28 April 2019. Bella gave birth to her first son, Air Rumi Akbar, on 18 September 2020. On 23 August 2022, Bella gave birth to her first daughter, Amala Puti Sabai Akbar. In 2023, Bella filed for divorce after Zoni was released from prison, where he had served time for a drug-related offence. She then remarried in 2024.

== Filmography ==
=== Film ===
Bella has appeared in the following films:

Year	Title	Role	Note	Ref.
2010	Heart 2 Heart	Indah		
2010	Love in Perth	Icha		
2011	Virgin 3	Sherry		
2011	Kuntilanak Kesurupan			
2015	Tiger Boy	Kanya		
2016	2 Batas Waktu: Amanah Isa Al-Masih	Tiara remaja		
2016	Me vs Mami	Mira		
2018	Kembang Kantil	Alisa		
2022	Madu Murni	Murni		

=== Television series ===
Year	Title	Role	Note	Ref.
2009	Tangisan Issabela	Dinda	Karya debut	
2010	Di Mana Melani?	Serena Wirayuda		
2011	Antara Cinta dan Dusta	Naira		
2011	Anugerah	Calista		
2011—2012	Binar Bening Berlian	Bening		
2012	Karunia	Karunia		
2013	Berkah	Irene		
2013	Anak-Anak Manusia	Mila		
2013	TV Movie		Episode: "Allah Tau Siapa yang Aku Sayang"	
2013	TV Movie		Episode: "My Lovely Brother"	
2014	Kita Nikah yuk	Ibel	Kameo	
2015	Jakarta Love Story	Shinta		
2015	Ngantri ke Sorga the Series	Maemunah		
2015	TV Movie		Episode: "Umroh Ke Tanah Abang"	
2015	Rajawali	Lembayung		
2015	TV Movie		Episode: "Perawan dan Cinta"	
2016	Jawara	Annisa		
2016	TV Movie		Episode: "Dua Perempuan Kepo"	
2016—2017	Anugerah Cinta	Naura		
2017	Berkah Cinta	Tania Amalia		
2017	TV Movie		Episode: "3 Jomblo"	
2017	Rahmat Cinta	Bella		
2018—2019	Cinta Suci	Suci Puspitasari		
2018—2019	Cinta Suci	Sahara Puspitasari		
2020	Indah Pada Waktunya	Merry		
