= Jakarta Love Story =

- Genre: Musical Comedy Drama
- Created by: SinemArt
- Written by: Lintang Pramudya Wardani
- Directed by: Vemmy Sagita
- Starring: Irish Bella; Rezky Aditya; Rionaldo Stockhorst; Mischa Chandrawinata; Michella Putri; Nasya Marcella; Keth Agustine; Christian Sugiono; Kenang Mirdad; Mezty Mez; Roy Marten; Delano Daniel
- Opening theme: Mahadewa, "Immortal Love Songs"
- Ending theme: Mahadewa, "Immortal Love Songs"
- Country of origin: Indonesia
- Original language: Indonesian
- No. of seasons: 1
- No. of episodes: 77

Production
- Executive producer: Elly Yanti Noor
- Producer: Leo Sutanto
- Production locations: Jakarta, Indonesia
- Editor: Heru Hendriyarto
- Running time: One hour (21:30-22:30pm Indonesia West Time)
- Production company: SinemArt

Original release
- Network: RCTI [TV OKEY] Malaysia
- Release: February 9 – May 20, 2015

Jakarta Love Story is an Indonesian soap opera musical comedy drama produced by SinemArt that airs daily on RCTI. The cast includes Irish Bella, Rezky Aditya, Rionaldo Stockhorst, Mischa Chandrawinata, Michella Putri, Nasya Marcella, Keth Agustine, Christian Sugiono, Kenang Mirdad & Meistika Senichaksana.

== Cast ==
- Irish Bella — Shinta
- Rezky Aditya — Aryo
- Rionaldo Stockhorst — Teguh
- Mischa Chandrawinata — Dino
- Michella Putri — Alyssa
- Nasya Marcella — Dira
- Kenang Mirdad — Ucok
- Delano Daniel — Vito
- Ketrin Agustine — Cathy
- Mona Ratuliu — Shinta's wife
- Irwan Chandra — Jhony
- Roy Marten — Bandrio
- Eeng Saptahadi — Hendro
- Adipura — Jacob
- Debby Sahertian — Puspa
- Christian Sugiono — Angga
- Mezty Mez — Tiffany
- Yoelitta Palar — Tiara
- Shandy Ishabella — Vito's wife
- Ramdhani Qubil AJ — Dira's father
- Shelsie Valencia — Emely
- Elkie Kwee
- Kenny Mayang Sari as Kenny

== Characters ==
Character	Description
Shinta	Teguh's Girlfriend
Aryo	Friend Teguh & Dino; Child Bandrio
Teguh	Shinta's Boyfriend
Dino	Cathy's Boyfriend
Alyssa	Friend Dira
Dira	Friend Alyssa; Like Aryo
Cathy	Dino's Girlfriend
Ucok	Like Dira
Angga	—N/a
Tiffany	—N/a
Bandrio	Aryo's father
