= Rajawali, Firozabad =

Village in Uttar Pradesh, India

Rajawali
- Village
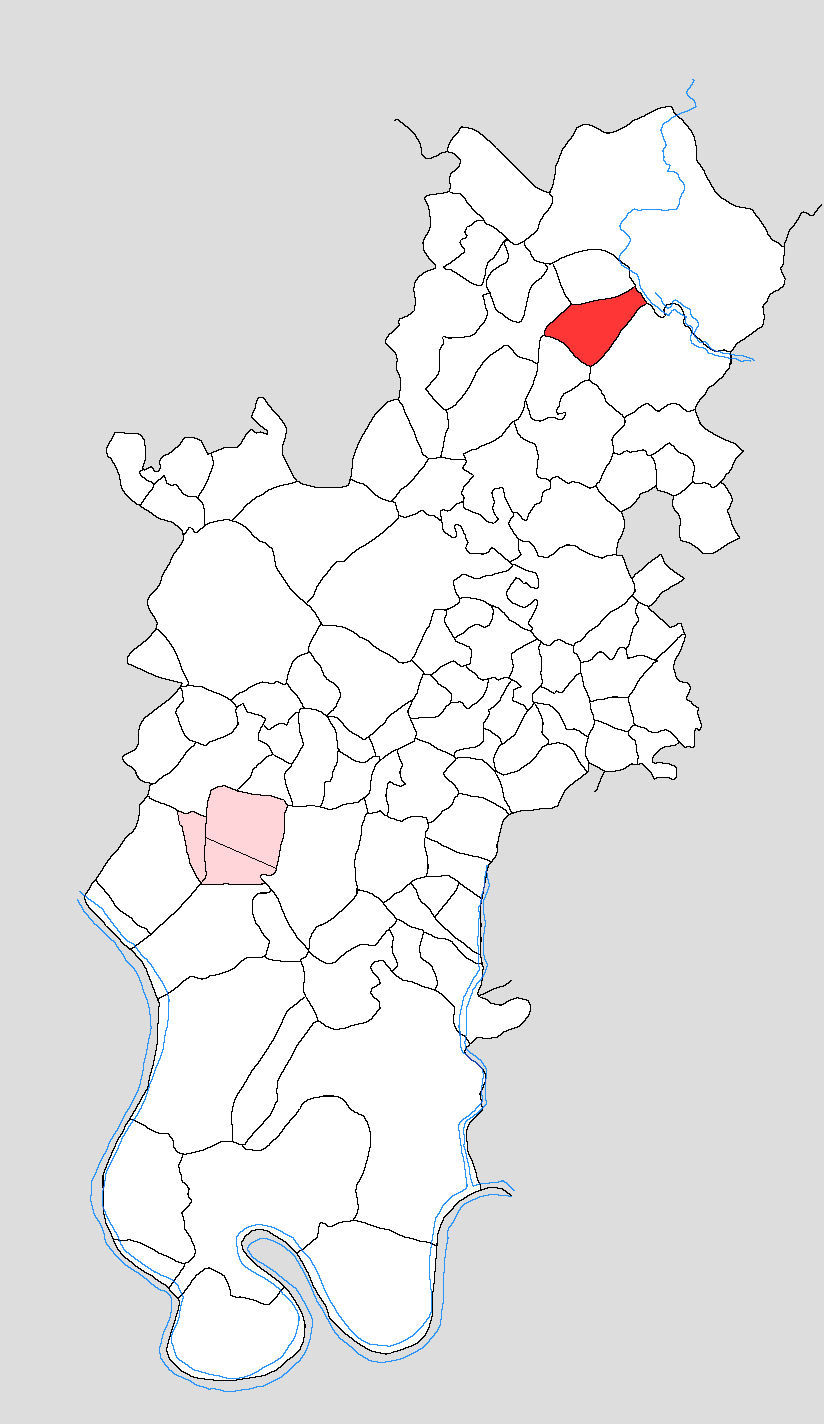
- Map showing Rajawali in Tundla block

- Location in Uttar Pradesh, India
- Coordinates: 27.33945°N 78.33716°E
- Country: India
- State: Uttar Pradesh
- District: Firozabad
- Tehsil: Tundla

Area
  - Total: 3.097 km^{2} (1.196 sq mi)

Population (2011)
  - Total: 2,074
  - Density: 669.7/km^{2} (1,734/sq mi)
- Time zone: UTC+5:30 (IST)
- PIN: 207302

Rajawali (Rajāwalī) is a village in Tundla block of Firozabad district, Uttar Pradesh. It was formerly part of Etah district. As of 2011, it has a population of 2,074, in 300 households.

== Demographics ==
As of 2011, Rajawali had a population of 2,074, in 460 households. This population was 53.4% male (1,107) and 46.6% female (967). The 0-6 age group numbered 269 (144 male and 125 female), making up 13.0% of the total population. 166 residents were members of Scheduled Castes, or 8.0% of the total.

The 1981 census recorded Rajawali as having a population of 1,306 people (740 male and 566 female), in 210 households and 209 physical houses. It was then counted as part of Jalesar block and tehsil in Etah district.

The 1961 census recorded Rajawali as comprising 1 hamlet, with a total population of 944 people (515 male and 429 female), in 177 households and 113 physical houses. The area of the village was given as 656 acres. It was then counted as part of Jalesar block and tehsil in Etah district.

== Infrastructure ==
As of 2011, Rajawali had 2 primary schools; it did not have any healthcare facilities. Drinking water was provided by tap and hand pump; there were no public toilets. The village did not have a post office or public library; there was at least some access to electricity for all purposes. Streets were made of both kachcha and pakka materials.
