= Anak Langit =

2017 Indonesian television series

- Genre: Action; Romance; Drama
- Screenplay by: Hilman Hariwijaya
- Story by: Hilman Hariwijaya
- Directed by: Akbar Bhakti
- Starring: Stefan William; Marcella Daryanani; Hana Saraswati; Anthony Xie; Gerald Yo; Finn Bramasta
- Opening theme: "100 Rock N Roll" by Powerslaves; "Elang" by Dewa 19
- Ending theme: "100 Rock N Roll" by Powerslaves; "Elang" by Dewa 19
- Composer: Wiwiex Soedarno
- Country of origin: Indonesia
- Original language: Indonesian
- No. of seasons: 1
- No. of episodes: 1560

Production
- Producer: Leo Sutanto
- Cinematography: Jun Mahir
- Editors: Bambang Herdiana; Sirojuddin; Herry Kurniawan; Rully K.P.; Zulfian
- Camera setup: Multi-camera
- Production company: SinemArt

Original release
- Network: SCTV
- Release: February 20, 2017 – March 29, 2020

Anak Langit is an Indonesian television series produced by SinemArt which premiered on February 20, 2017 on SCTV and is the fifth longest Indonesian soap opera based on the number of episodes. The series is directed by Akbar Bhakti and stars Stefan William, Marcella Daryanani, and Hana Saraswati.

== Synopsis ==
Al, Andra, and Key live at the Orphanage owned by Rozak and Ida. The three of them have different personalities, but complement each other. They are members of a motorcycle gang, "Rainbow".

One of the members of "Rainbow" named Reno who had died entrusting his younger brother, Vika to Al. As time goes by, Al puts his heart on Vika. However, Rimba who is the leader of the motorcycle gang "Anthrax", who is none other than Al's biggest enemy, tries to win Vika's heart.

== Cast ==
- Stefan William as Hiro
- Marcella Daryanani as Afni Ayu Lestari (Tari)
- Hana Saraswati as Sasya Lesyandra
- Anthony Xie as Toni
- Gerald Yo as Gerry
- Mario Maulana as Robert Chaniago
- Raya Kitty as Eva Monita (Emon) & Mocca
- Fathir Muchtar as Rozak
- Fera Feriska as Dedeh
- Umar Lubis as Junaedi
- Devi Permatasari as Irene
- Angga Putra as Jaelani
- Leon Dozan as Asep
- Mezty Mez as Alis
- Benny Ruswandi as Kohar
- Henny Timbul as Astri (Aci)
- Sasha Alexa as Merry
- Merry Mustaf as Leha
- Adipura as Hariman
- Aldo Bamar as Agil
- Sisca Magdalena Kauditan as Rohaya
- Firman Maliksyah as Toha
- Audi Marissa as Marissa
- Fanny Fadillah as Ucup
- Cassandra Lee as Selina
- George Rudy as Dani
- Fendy Pradana as Darko
- Kevin Kambey as Jefri
- Natalie Zenn as Tasya
- Esta Pramanita as Ayumi
- Fiolina Teja as Fiona
- Ije Kurniawan as Evan
- Teuku Anwar as Axel
- Willy Dozan as Billy
- Ammar Zoni as Al & Ali
- Nasya Marcella as Milka Ayu Kinasih & Maira
- Immanuel Caesar Hito as Andra
- Yabes Yosia as Alvino
- Cemal Faruk as Key Salahuddin
- Dylan Carr as Rimba
- Ranty Maria as Vika
- Mischa Chandrawinata as Erland & Edward
- Angela Gilsha as Finny
- Ari Wibowo as Wibowo
- Yoelitta Palar as Yulita
- Anjasmara as Reza
- Mega Aulia as Farida (Ida)
- Michella Putri as Putri
- Bryan Domani as Endro Jorgy (Enjoy)
- Verrel Bramasta as Satria
- Finn Bramasta as Geng Sanca
- Erdin Werdrayana Wijaya as Erdin Werdrayana
- Thoriq Hafidz as Arik
- Imelda Lubis as Maya
- Sabina Katya as Mawar
- Fauzan Riado as Ibes
- Billiand Wekan as Bono
- Stevn Tanady as Bobi
- Yuditia Winanda as Yuditia
- Macho Virgonta as Eka/Saka
- Rasyid Karim as Ramli
- Alvin Smith as Geng The Black Skull
- Dede Wijaya as Tama
- Martin Immanuel as Martin
- Ise Irish as Irish
- Emiliano Fernando Cirtizo as Rivaldo
- Kevin Hillers as Rei
- James Thomas as Bara
- Hud Filbert as Bima
- Latief Sitepu as Dzolim
- Debby Cynthia Dewi as Dewi
- Aditya Zoni as Omar
- Panji Zoni as Aji
- Zoe Jackson as Adelia
- Maureen Daryanani as Heli
- Ochi Rosdiana as Diana Dewi
- Juan Christian as Reno
- Agatha Valerie as Annisa
- Volland Humonggio as Volan
- Ikbal Fauzi as Pito
- Ichal Muhammad as Bimo
- Evan Marvino as Evan Marvino
- Irwan Chandra as Alonso
- Reymon Knuliqh as Froz
- Triningtyas as Astuti
- Rudi Kawilarang as Bedok
- Rangga Azof as Niko
- Rexy Rizky as Dilon
- Zack Lee as Zacky
- Renald Ramadhan as Rama
- Dinda Hauw as Asma
- Cut Meyriska as Adinda/Amanda
- Ivan Fadila as Baskara
- Devi Lanni as Cantika
- Sandy Pradana as Sandy Pradana
- Rifat Darwis as Rifat Darwis
- Robert Chaniago as Izzy
- Rezna Thawaffie as Roni
- Alex Rio as Edo
- Sylvia Menul as Dina
- Bobby Saleh Malik as Kang Deden
- Syarifadiya as Ana
- Agus Wibowo as Ayah Yulita
- Bella Kuku Tanesia as Dini
- Daniel Bond as Satpam

== Soundtrack ==
Title	Performed by	Written by	Label
"Elang" (Note: Main theme song episodes 1 to 205)	Dewa 19	Ahmad Dhani	Aquarius Pustaka Musik
"100% Rock n Roll" (Note: Main theme song episodes 206 to 1560)	Powerslaves		Kereta Rock n Roll Label n Artist Management
"Bunga Cintaku"	Niyo Nino	Iwan Sastra	Pelangi Records
"Hanya Kamu"	Powerslaves		Kereta Rock n Roll Label n Artist Management
"Hidup Untukmu"	Gisel Anastasia feat Rayen Pono	Rayen Pono	Halo Entertainment
"Karena Cinta"	The Junas	Agung Saputra	Bentuk Musik
"Kau dan Aku"	Powerslaves		Kereta Rock n Roll Label n Artist Management
"Kurayu Bidadari"	Al Ghazali	Vegas Antares	Pelangi Records
"Songs for the Lovers"	Powerslaves		Kereta Rock n Roll Label n Artist Management
"Terus Melangkah"	Powerslaves		Kereta Rock n Roll Label n Artist Management

Main theme song

== Awards and nominations ==
Year	Award	Nominated works	Category	Results
2017	Indonesian Television Awards 2017	Program Prime Time Terpopuler	Anak Langit	Nominated
2017	Indonesian Television Awards 2017	Aktor Terpopuler	Immanuel Caesar Hito	Nominated
2017	Indonesian Television Awards 2017	Aktor Terpopuler	Stefan William	Nominated
2017	Panasonic Gobel Awards 2017	Drama Seri Terfavorit	Anak Langit	Nominated
2017	Panasonic Gobel Awards 2017	Aktor Terfavorit	Ammar Zoni	Nominated
2017	Panasonic Gobel Awards 2017	Aktris Terfavorit	Ranty Maria	Nominated
2017	SCTV Awards 2017	Sinetron Paling Ngetop	Anak Langit	Won
2017	SCTV Awards 2017	Soundtrack Sinetron Paling Ngetop	"Elang" — Dewa 19	Nominated
2017	SCTV Awards 2017	Aktor Utama Paling Ngetop	Stefan William	Nominated
2017	SCTV Awards 2017	Aktris Utama Paling Ngetop	Ranty Maria	Nominated
2017	SCTV Awards 2017	Aktor Pendamping Paling Ngetop	Immanuel Caesar Hito	Won
2017	SCTV Awards 2017	Aktor Pendamping Paling Ngetop	Cemal Faruk	Nominated
2017	SCTV Awards 2017	Aktor Pendamping Paling Ngetop	Dylan Carr	Nominated
2017	SCTV Awards 2017	Aktris Pendamping Paling Ngetop	Marcella Daryanani	Nominated
2017	SCTV Awards 2017	Aktris Pendamping Paling Ngetop	Raya Kitty	Nominated
2018	Panasonic Gobel Awards 2018	Sinetron Serial Terfavorit	Anak Langit	Nominated
2018	Panasonic Gobel Awards 2018	Pemeran Pria Sinetron Terfavorit	Stefan William	Nominated
2018	Panasonic Gobel Awards 2018	Pemeran Wanita Sinetron	Ranty Maria	Nominated
2018	SCTV Awards 2018	Sinetron Paling Ngetop	Anak Langit	Nominated
2018	SCTV Awards 2018	Soundtrack Sinetron Paling Ngetop	"100% Rock N Roll" — Powerlaves	Nominated
2018	SCTV Awards 2018	Aktor Utama Paling Ngetop	Stefan William	Won
2018	SCTV Awards 2018	Aktor Pendamping Paling Ngetop	Immanuel Caesar Hito	Nominated
2018	SCTV Awards 2018	Aktris Pendamping Paling Ngetop	Nasya Marcella	Nominated
2018	SCTV Awards 2018	Aktris Pendamping Paling Ngetop	Marcella Daryanani	Nominated
2019	Indonesian Television Awards 2019	Aktor Terpopuler	Stefan William	Nominated
2019	SCTV Awards 2019	Sinetron Paling Ngetop	Anak Langit	Nominated
2019	SCTV Awards 2019	Soundtrack Sinetron Paling Ngetop	"100% Rock N Roll" — Powerslaves	Nominated
2019	SCTV Awards 2019	Aktor Utama Paling Ngetop	Stefan William	Won
2019	SCTV Awards 2019	Aktor Pendamping Paling Ngetop	Dylan Carr	Nominated
2019	SCTV Awards 2019	Aktris Pendamping Paling Ngetop	Angela Gilsha	Nominated
2019	SCTV Awards 2019	Aktris Pendamping Paling Ngetop	Marcella Daryanani	Nominated
2019	Panasonic Gobel Awards 2019	Sinetron Serial Terfavorit	Anak Langit	Nominated
2019	Panasonic Gobel Awards 2019	Pemeran Pria Sinetron Terfavorit	Stefan William	Nominated
