= Anak Jalanan =

Indonesian television series

- Genre: Romance; Sports drama
- Screenplay by: Hilman Hariwijaya
- Story by: Hilman Hariwijaya
- Directed by: Akbar Bhakti
- Starring: Stefan William; Natasha Wilona; Ranty Maria; Ammar Zoni; Immanuel Caesar Hito; Cut Meyriska
- Opening theme: "Cinta Gila" — Triad
- Ending theme: "Cinta Gila" — Triad
- Country of origin: Indonesia
- Original language: Indonesian
- No. of seasons: 1
- No. of episodes: 810

Production
- Executive producer: Elly Yanti Noor
- Producer: Leo Sutanto
- Running time: ±60 minutes
- Production company: SinemArt

Original release
- Network: RCTI
- Release: 12 October 2015 – 1 February 2017

Related
- Anak Jalanan: A New Beginning (2021)

Anak Jalanan (lit. 'Street Kids') is an Indonesian romance/sports drama television series produced by SinemArt and broadcast on RCTI since 2015. Directed by Akbar Bhakti, the series stars Stefan William, Natasha Wilona, Ranty Maria, Ammar Zoni, Immanuel Caesar Hito, and Cut Meyriska.

== Plot summary ==
Boy is a smart, handsome teenager who looks cool and gets plenty of attention from young women, whom he generally ignores. He is also the leader of the Warrior motorcycle gang. He still pines for Adriana, his ex-girlfriend who left him for a much older and wealthier man.

One day, Boy saves Reva, a girl on a motorbike who is being chased by another gang. Boy is impressed with Reva's riding skills, but she is annoyed at him. The rival gang, led by Mondy, mistakenly believe Reva to be a member of Warrior, and she anticipates a gang rivalry. Boy feels guilty and decides to dissolve Warrior. This leads to conflict among the group's members, and Warrior eventually splits up.

Reva is the daughter of a wealthy businessman, Bey, and she races motorcycles as a form of rebellion against the fact that he marries Adriana, a girl her own age, after Reva's mother dies. Reva believes Adriana is the cause of her mother's death, and she resists Adriana's attempts to win her over.

In the end, Boy dies in a motorcycle accident.

== Cast and characters ==
- Stefan William as Boy Wirawan
- Natasha Wilona as Revalina "Reva" Putri
- Cut Meyriska as Adriana
- Immanuel Caesar Hito as Mondy
- Ammar Zoni as Rocky
- Ranty Maria as Cinta
- Raya Kitty as Raya
- Marcella Daryanani as Bella
- Gerald Yo as Haykal
- Adipura as Bey
- Umar Lubis as Wirawan
- Fathir Muchtar as Rama
- Yoelitta Palar as Marissa
- Devi Permatasari as Rengganis
- Meriam Bellina as Cathy
- Henny Timbul as Irah
- Mario Maulana as Amir
- Kathy Indera as Melly
- Jho Rizki as Willy
- Megan Domani as Megan
- Dylan Carr as Rio

== Music ==
| Song title | Singer | Creator | Production |
|---|---|---|---|
| "Cinta Gila" | T.R.I.A.D | Ahmad Dhani | Republik Cinta Records |
| "Lagu Galau" | Al Ghazali | Ayu Rizki Yani | Pelangi Records |
| "Amnesia" | Al Ghazali | Firman Purnama | Pelangi Records |

Main theme song

== Controversy ==
=== KPI warning ===
The Indonesian Broadcasting Commission (KPI) issued a warning to the producers of Anak Jalanan on 24 November 2015 for the use of explicit violence in the 11 November episode. The series also often depicts scenes of motorcycle racing, which the KPI deemed inappropriate for broadcast due to the potential for copycat behaviour, especially as the show was mainly watched by teenagers. On 31 December, the KPI deemed the scene of a man yelling "bego" (lit. 'stupid') and "tolol" (lit. 'idiot') as unsuitable for teen viewing.

On 22 January 2016, the KPI decided that an episode featuring two men driving motorcycles at high speeds could have negative impact and might be imitated by viewers, especially teenagers. Five days later, on 27 January, it identified a fight scene involving a group of men and decided to impose an administrative sanction.

=== Dylan Carr arrest ===
On 6 January 2016, actor Dylan Carr was arrested for cannabis possession while on his way to a filming location. Urine tests revealed he had been using illicit drugs.

== Awards and nominations ==
| Year | Award | Category | Recipient | Results | Ref. |
|---|---|---|---|---|---|
| 2016 | Indonesian Television Awards 2016 | Sinetron Terpopuler | Anak Jalanan | Won | |
| 2016 | Indonesian Television Awards 2016 | Aktor Terpopuler | Stefan William | Nominated | |
| 2016 | Indonesian Television Awards 2016 | Aktris Terpopuler | Natasha Wilona | Nominated | |
| 2016 | Panasonic Gobel Awards 2016 | Drama Seri Terfavorit | Anak Jalanan | Won | |
| 2016 | Panasonic Gobel Awards 2016 | Aktor Terfavorit | Stefan William | Nominated | |
| 2016 | Panasonic Gobel Awards 2016 | Aktris Terfavorit | Natasha Wilona | Nominated | |
| 2016 | Nickelodeon Indonesia Kids' Choice Awards 2016 | Aktor Terfavorit | Stefan William | Won | |
| 2016 | Nickelodeon Indonesia Kids' Choice Awards 2016 | Aktris Terfavorit | Natasha Wilona | Won | |
| 2016 | Nickelodeon Indonesia Kids' Choice Awards 2016 | Aktor Terfavorit | Immanuel Caesar Hito | Nominated | |
| 2016 | Nickelodeon Indonesia Kids' Choice Awards 2016 | Aktris Terfavorit | Raya Kitty | Nominated | |
| 2016 | Silet Awards 2016 | Sinetron Tersilet | Anak Jalanan | Won | |
| 2016 | Silet Awards 2016 | Pasangan Sinetron Tersilet | Mondy & Raya (Immanuel Caesar Hito & Raya Kitty) | Nominated | |
| 2016 | Silet Awards 2016 | Pasangan Sinetron Tersilet | Iyan & Melly (Angga Putra & Kathy Indera) | Nominated | |
| 2016 | Silet Awards 2016 | Pemeran Pembantu Tersilet | Henny Timbul (Bi Irah) | Won | |
| 2016 | Silet Awards 2016 | Pemeran Orangtua Tersilet | Adipura (Mas Bey) | Nominated | |
| 2016 | Silet Awards 2016 | Pemeran Orangtua Tersilet | Fathir Muchtar (Abah Rama) | Nominated | |
| 2016 | Silet Awards 2016 | Pemeran Orangtua Tersilet | Yoelitta Palar (Marissa/Macan) | Won | |
| 2016 | Silet Awards 2016 | Idola Baru Tersilet | Immanuel Caesar Hito | Won | |
| 2016 | Silet Awards 2016 | Idola Baru Tersilet | Natasha Wilona | Nominated | |

== Reboot ==
A reboot titled Anak Jalanan: A New Beginning, produced by MNC Pictures, premiered on 13 December 2021 on GTV.
