= Sebastian Gunawan =

Indonesian high-fashion designer (born 1967)

- Born: 2 July 1967 (age 59); Jakarta, Indonesia
- Other name: Seba
- Education: Istituto Artistico Dell' Abbigliamento Marangoni
- Occupation: Fashion designer
- Spouse: Cristina Panarese (m. 1992)

Sebastian Gunawan (born 2 July 1967 in Jakarta), also known as Seba, is an Indonesian fashion designer. He is known for his designs of ornate evening gowns.

He is a member of the Indonesian Fashion Designers Association.

== Early life and education ==
Gunawan was born in Jakarta, Indonesia on 2 July 1967. At the age of 14, he developed interests in fashion designing, which he developed by sketching clothing designs as a high school student and working part-time at seamstress. Pursuing this, he enrolled at the LPTB Susan Budiharjo in 1985, a school of fashion in Jakarta run by its namesake—a first generation Indonesian fashion designer. This was followed by further studies at the Fashion Institute of Design and Merchandising in Los Angeles, USA where he graduated and obtained the Certificate of Fashion Design. In 1991, he graduated from the Istituto Artistico Dell' Abbigliamento Marangoni in Milan, Italy with a specialisation in fashion illustration. In Milan, he met his wife and business partner, Cristina Panarese.

== Career ==
Following his graduation from Marangoni, he worked part-time under the late designer, Egon von Furstenberg. He returned to Indonesia shortly after, due to complications to acquire residency status in Italy.

In 1992, following his return to his native Indonesia, Gunawan launched his first collection of clothing with Panarese, entitled "Sebastian Gunawan". This was followed by his fashion show debut in 1995 with a collection named Potret Hidup ("A Life's Portrait"), featuring evening and ball gowns, which later became his signature items.

In 1997 with Panarese, he introduced his first ready-to-wear collection, Votum, which became his first to be sold in stores. This was followed by another ready-to-wear line called SebastianRed in 2000.

In 2004, he represented Indonesia on behalf of the Indonesian Textile Association at the International Apparel Federation (IAF) in Barcelona, Spain. There, he was awarded the IAF Young Designer's Award for this entry entitled "I Miss Bali". In the same year, he made his debuts at the Kuala Lumpur Fashion Week, the Hong Kong Fashion Week, and the Southeast Asia International Fashion Show in Nanning, China. In 2006, Gunawan launched a bridal collection, Sebastian Sposa.

== Personal life ==
Gunawan married Cristina Panarese, a fellow fashion designer, in 1992. He met Panarese during his studies at the Istituto Marangoni in Milan. Together, they have a daughter, Alessia.
