= Nasya Marcella =

Indonesian actress (born 1996)

- Born: Victoria Nasya Marcella Tedja; Jakarta, Indonesia
- Occupation: Actress

Victoria Nasya Marcella Tedja, also known as Nasya Marcella (born 9 December 1996) is an actress in Indonesian soap operas. She is known for starring in Satria as Tiara and on Yang Masih Dibawah Umur as Tiara. She is also known for starring Akibat Pernikahan Dini as Dini

== Television ==
Year	Title	Channel	Production	Role
2011	Safira	Indosiar	Multivision	Safira
2012	Yang Masih Dibawah Umur	RCTI	SinemArt	Tiara
2013	Magic	RCTI	SinemArt	Nadine
2013-2014	Fortune Cookies	RCTI	SinemArt	Jasmin
2014-2015	Jakarta Love Story	RCTI	SinemArt	Dira
2016	7 Manusia Harimau New Generation	MNC TV	SinemArt	Sekar Kemuning (Kay)
2017-2019	Anak Langit	SCTV	SinemArt	Milka Ayu Kinasih/Maira'
2021	Suci dalam Cinta	SCTV	Screenplay Productions	Sheila
2022	Aku Bukan Wanita Pilihan	RCTI	MNC Pictures	Tiara Fitri Anjani

== Movies ==
- Abdullah V Takeshi (2016) as Indah
- Demi Cinta (2016) as Sandra
