= Adipura =

Indonesian actor

- Born: Adipura Prabahaswara; February 24, 1969 (age 57); Jakarta, Indonesia
- Occupation: Actor

Adipura Prabahaswara (born February 24, 1969), known mononymously as Adipura, is an Indonesian actor who is known for being an antagonist on various soap operas and dramas.

== Career ==
His television career began as a character named Karna on the series, "Saputangan Dari Bandung Selatan" in 1994. He got his first major role on the series, "Mutiara Cinta", in 1995. Throughout the 1990s and early 2000s, he starred in many series including Melangkah Di Atas Awan, Bayangan Adinda, Dia, Aku Ingin Hidup and Sebatas Impian. He was best known for his role as Surya in the soap opera, "Gerhana". He was often cast due to his looks, charisma and fierce acting style.He featured in Buku Harian Seorang Istri in 2021 and starred in Anak Jalanan. He starred on the soap opera, Calon Presiden, in 2019. As of 2023, he is in the soap opera, "Rindu Bukan Rindu" and Belok Kanan Jalan Terus.

== Personal life ==
He is known for his collection of European cars and was rumored to be in debt over his collection. He is an avid cyclist. While he has gained notoriety for his role as a villain, he is a preacher in real life.

He is married to Ranee Dee and has two children, Mahira and Maghara.
