= Rajawali (TV series) =

- Genre: Musical Comedy Drama
- Created by: SinemArt
- Written by: Serena Luna
- Directed by: Tema Patrosza
- Starring: Irish Bella; Giorgino Abraham; Verrell Bramasta; Baim Wong; Natasha Wilona; Bella Sofhie; Kevin Kambey; Aryani Fitriana windy Wulandari; Marcella Daryanani; Fathir Muchtar; Donny Kusuma; Rizky Billar
- Theme music composer: Purwacaka
- Opening theme: Zahra Damariva, Cinta Tak Terhalang
- Ending theme: Zahra Damariva, Cinta Tak Terhalang
- Country of origin: Indonesia
- Original language: Indonesian
- No. of seasons: 1
- No. of episodes: 28

Production
- Executive producer: Ely Yanti Noor
- Producer: Leo Sutanto
- Production locations: Jakarta, Indonesia
- Running time: One hour (18:00-20:00pm Indonesia West Time)
- Production company: SinemArt

Original release
- Network: RCTI
- Release: September 7 – October 5, 2015

Rajawali is an Indonesian soap opera television series, produced by SinemArt. It debuted on RCTI on September 7, 2015, with its final episode airing October 5, 2015.

== Cast ==
- Giorgino Abraham as Sakti
- Irish Bella as Lembayung
- Verrel Bramasta as Panji
- Baim Wong as Satria/Rajawali
- Natasha Wilona as Mentari
- Bella Shofie as Ratu Buaya Putih
- Kevin Kambey as Braga
- Aryani Fitriana as Bunga
- Windy Wulandari as Tiara
- Marcella Daryanani as Indah
- Fathir Muchtar as Bayu Aji
- Fendi Perdana as Ki Arang
- Donny Kesuma as Rusdi/Ki Gledek
- Anika Hakim as Nyi Waras
- Ine Dewi as Sekar
- Rizky Billar as Rizky
