= Boy (TV series) =

Indonesian soap opera

- Genre: Drama; Romance; Action
- Created by: SinemArt
- Screenplay by: Hilman Hariwijaya
- Story by: Hilman Hariwijaya
- Directed by: Akbar Bhakti
- Starring: Stefan William; Jessica Milla; Cut Meyriska; Prisia Nasution; Mischa Chandrawinata; Dinda Kanya Dewi; Bryan Domani; Leon Dozan; Hana Saraswati; Adjie Pangestu; Meriam Bellina; Willy Dozan; Anthony Xie; Jihane Almira; Firman Maliksyah; Aldo Bamar
- Theme music composer: Stefan William & Celine
- Opening theme: "Demi Dia" — Stefan William & Celine
- Ending theme: "Demi Dia" — Stefan William & Celine
- Composer: Wiwiex Soedarno
- Country of origin: Indonesia
- Original language: Indonesian
- No. of seasons: 1
- No. of episodes: 9999

Production
- Producer: Leo Sutanto
- Cinematography: Jun Mahir
- Editors: Hendrajat; Eko HP; Cecep Sudrajat; Herry Kurniawan; Rully KP; Bambang Herdiana; Zulfian; Sirojuddin
- Camera setup: Multi-camera
- Running time: 40—120 minutes
- Production company: SinemArt

Original release
- Network: SCTV
- Release: April 17 – June 11, 2017

Boy is an Indonesian soap opera produced by SinemArt which premiered April 17, 2017 on SCTV. This soap opera is directed by Akbar Bhakti and starring by Stefan William, Jessica Milla, Cut Meyriska, Prisia Nasution, and Mischa Chandrawinata.

== Plot ==
Narrated, a handsome man named Boy (Stefan William) is a person who has an age of about 24 years. The figure of the man is a man who has a cool character, intelligent, courageous, and of course kind.

He has been raised in a very rich family environment. However, the figure of this Boy is not a figure who has an arrogant nature. Although he has lived and also grew up in a wealthy family environment, he also often mingle with small people. Because basically, himself felt so confused because always called and feel so comfortable when he was in the neighborhood of people who have a simple life or lower middle class.

Therefore, during his childhood, he also once helped a girl who was being seduced by stubborn boys, to him even memories of a necklace Lolipop. However, he did not know what the name of the girl he had helped and also he gave the necklace.

The name of the girl she has helped and also she gives the necklace is Suci (Jessica Mila). However, the character Stefan has played is much more time to spend college and also take care of the martial arts that he has followed, the BLACK MACAN.

His proximity to his parents, the Sultan (Adjie Pangestu and Rosa (Meriam Bellina), and also his sister, Titan (Bryan Elmi Domani), were poorly formed. But he never felt irritated or hated. He was more introspection and seek to know what makes it can not be merged with his family.

Until finally Boy had to help his father take care of his father's company because the construction is delayed until his father was hospitalized because of a poisoned arrow. However, the journey of his life is always hampered by his own brother.

== Cast ==
- Stefan William — Boy
- Jessica Mila — Suci
- Cut Meyriska — Kitty
- Prisia Nasution — Adel
- Mischa Chandrawinata — Tiger
- Dinda Kanyadewi — Kinar
- Bryan Domani — Titan
- Leon Dozan — Leon Dozan and Leon (Dual role)
- Hana Saraswati — Lorry and Lorry Agustin (Dual role)
- Adjie Pangestu — Sultan
- Meriam Bellina — Rossa
- Willy Dozan — Willy Dozan and Willy (Dual role)
- Anthony Xie — Gilang
- Jihane Almira Chedid — Dara
- Firman Maliksyah (cameo)
- Aldo Bamar (cameo)
- Audi Marissa — Gwen
- Iedil Putra — Dirga
- Cut Memey — Erna
- Yoelitta Palar — Winda
- Evan Marvino — Umang
- Johan Morgan — Alexander
- Ismi Melinda — Tania
- Azis Fachru — Tiger (child)
