= 2019 Indonesian Film Festival =

2019 Indonesian film awards

39th Indonesian Film Festival
- Date: 8 December 2019
- Site: Opus Ballroom, The Tribata; Jakarta, Indonesia
- Hosted by: Rory Asyari; Melissa Karim

Highlights
- Best Picture: Memories of My Body
- Most awards: Memories of My Body (8)
- Most nominations: Memories of My Body; This Earth of Mankind; Two Blue Stripes (12)

Television coverage
- Network: Metro TV

The 39th Citra Awards, presented by the Indonesian Film Board and Ministry of Education, Culture, Research, and Technology, honored the achievement in Indonesian cinema released from 1 October 2018 to 30 September 2019. The ceremony was held on 8 December 2019 at the Opus Ballroom, The Tribata, Jakarta, Indonesia, and presented by journalist Rory Asyari and announcer Melissa Karim.

Drama film Memories of My Body won eight awards, including Best Picture. Other winners included Gundala with three, Cemara's Family and Two Blue Stripes with two and 27 Steps of May, Help is on the Way, How Far I'll Go, My Stupid Boss 2, No One Is Crazy in This Town and Nussa Bisa with one.

== Winners and nominees ==
The nominations were announced on 12 November 2019. The nominations were led by Memories of My Body, This Earth of Mankind and Two Blue Stripes with twelve each, while 27 Steps of May, Glorious Days and Gundala followed with nine each.

Winners are listed first, highlighted in boldface, and indicated with a double dagger (‡).

**Best Picture**: **Memories of My Body – Ifa Isfansyah, producer**‡; 27 Steps of May – Wilza Lubis, Rayya Makarim and Ravi L. Bharwani, producers; Cemara's Family – Anggia Kharisma and Gina S. Noer, producers; This Earth of Mankind – Frederica, producer; Two Blue Stripes – Chand Parwez Servia and Fiaz Servia, producers	**Best Director**: **Garin Nugroho – Memories of My Body**‡; Gina S. Noer – Two Blue Stripes; Hanung Bramantyo – This Earth of Mankind; Ravi L. Bharwani – 27 Steps of May; Riri Riza – Glorious Days
**Best Actor**: **Muhammad Khan – Memories of My Body as Juno**‡; Abimana Aryasatya – Gundala as Sancaka / Gundala; Angga Yunanda – Two Blue Stripes as Bima; Lukman Sardi – 27 Steps of May as May's father; Reza Rahadian – My Stupid Boss 2 as Bossman; Ringgo Agus Rahman – Cemara's Family as Abah	**Best Actress**: **Raihaanun – 27 Steps of May as May**‡; Adhisty Zara – Two Blue Stripes as Dara; Nirina Zubir – Cemara's Family as Emak; Sha Ine Febriyanti – This Earth of Mankind as Nyai Ontosoroh; Sissy Priscillia – Milly & Mamet as Milly
**Best Supporting Actor**: **Whani Darmawan – Memories of My Body as Warok**‡; Baskara Mahendra – Glorious Days as teenage Jojo; Jerome Kurnia – This Earth of Mankind as Robert Suurhof; Mandra – Si Doel the Movie 2 as Mandra; Randy Pangalila – Memories of My Body as the boxer; Verdi Solaiman – 27 Steps of May as the courier	**Best Supporting Actress**: **Cut Mini – Two Blue Stripes as Yuni**‡; Asri Welas – Cemara's Family as Ceu Salmah; Ayu Laksmi – This Earth of Mankind as Minke's mother; Laudya Cynthia Bella – Ambu as Fatma; Lulu Tobing – Two Blue Stripes as Rika; Tutie Kirana – The Wedding Shaman as Koes Marjati
**Best Original Screenplay**: **Two Blue Stripes – Gina S. Noer**‡; 27 Steps of May – Rayya Makarim; Ambu – Titien Wattimena; Memories of My Body – Garin Nugroho; Newly Rich – Joko Anwar	**Best Adapted Screenplay**: **Cemara's Family – Gina S. Noer and Yandy Laurens**‡; Glorious Days – Mira Lesmana and Gina S. Noer; Gundala – Joko Anwar; My Stupid Boss 2 – Upi Avianto; Si Doel the Movie 2 – Rano Karno
**Best Cinematography**: **Gundala – Ical Tanjung**‡; Ambu – Yudi Datau; Ave Maryam – Ical Tanjung; My Stupid Boss 2 – Arfian; Two Blue Stripes – Padri Nadeak	**Best Editing**: **Memories of My Body – Greg Arya**‡; 27 Steps of May – Wawan I. Wibowo and Lilik Subagyo; Glorious Days – W. Ichwandiardono; This Earth of Mankind – Sentot Sahid and Reynaldi Christanto; Two Blue Stripes – Aline Jusria
**Best Sound**: **Gundala – Khikmawan Santosa and Anhar Moha**‡; Glorious Days – Satrio Budiono and Sutrisno; Memories of My Body – Khikmawan Santosa and Dicky Permana; Pocong: The Origin – Khikmawan Santosa, M. Ikhsan Sungkar and Adimolana Machmud; This Earth of Mankind – Khikmawan Santosa, Satrio Budiono and Krisna Putra; Two Blue Stripes – Khikmawan Santosa, Syamsurrijal and Siti Asifa Nasution	**Best Visual Effects**: **Gundala – Abby Eldipie**‡; DreadOut – Andi Novianto, Gaga Nugraha and R. Satria Bhayangkara; Ghost Writer – Herdanius Larobu; Pocong: The Origin – Herdanius Larobu; This Earth of Mankind – Raiyan Laksamana
**Best Original Score**: **Memories of My Body – Mondo Gascaro**‡; 27 Steps of May – Thoersi Argeswara; Glorious Days – Lie Indra Perkasa; Gundala – Aghi Narottama, Bemby Gusti and Tony Merle; This Earth of Mankind – Andhika Triyadi; Two Blue Stripes – Andhika Triyadi	**Best Original Song**: **"Harta Berharga" from Cemara's Family – Music and Lyrics by Harry Tjahjono and Arswendo Atmowiloto; Performed by Bunga Citra Lestari**‡; "Aku Tanpamu" from Glorious Days – Music and Lyrics by Dimas Wibisana, Bianca Nelwan and Mira Lesmana; Performed by Maizura; "Bebas" from Glorious Days – Music and Lyrics by Iwa K, R. Yudis Dwikorana and Toriawan Sudarsono; Performed by Iwa K, Sheryl Sheinafia, Maizura, Agatha Pricilla and Cast; "Luruh" from Milly & Mamet – Music, Lyrics and Performed by Isyana Sarasvati and Rara Sekar Larasati; "Semesta Pertamaku" from Ambu – Music and Lyrics by Andi Rianto and Titien Wattimena; Performed by Widyawati
**Best Art Direction**: **Memories of My Body – Edy Wibowo**‡; 27 Steps of May – Vida Sylvia; Gundala – Wencislaus de Rozari; A Man Called Ahok – Adrianto Sinaga; This Earth of Mankind – Allan Sebastian; Two Blue Stripes – Oscart Firdaus	**Best Costume Design**: **Memories of My Body – Retno Ratih Damayanti**‡; Glorious Days – Chitra Subiyakto and Gemailla Gea Geriantiana; Gundala – Isabelle Patrice; A Man Called Ahok – Gemailla Gea Geriantiana; This Earth of Mankind – Retno Ratih Damayanti
**Best Makeup**: **My Stupid Boss 2 – Eba Sheba, Sutomo and Adi Wahono**‡; Gundala – Darwyn Tse; A Man Called Ahok – Jerry Octavianus; Memories of My Body – Retno Ratih Damayanti; This Earth of Mankind – Jerry Octavianus	**Best Live Action Short Film**: **No One Is Crazy in This Town – Wregas Bhanuteja**‡; Bura – Eden Junjung; Melangun – Wisnu Dewa Broto; Rest in Peace – M. Reza Fahriyansyah; Sunny Side of the Street – Andrew Kose; Woo Woo (or Those Silence That Kills You and Me) – Ismail Basbeth
**Best Documentary Feature**: **Help Is on the Way – Ismail Fahmi Lubis**‡; Etanan – Riandhani Yudha Pamungkas; Tonotwiyat – Yulika Anastasia Indrawati	**Best Documentary Short Film**: **How Far I'll Go – Ucu Agustin**‡; 50:50 – Rofie Nur Fauzie; Diary of Cattle – David Darmadi and Lidia Afrilita; Minor – Vena Besta Klaudina and Takziyatun Nufus; Rumah Terakhir – Thyke Syukur
**Best Animated Short Film**: **Nussa Bisa – Bony Wirasmono**‡; Krayon Biru – Samuel Anugrah Andre; Life of Death – Bryan Arfiandy and Jason Kiantoro; Rancak! – Kemberly Dilois and Stefani Guscia; S(h)aring – Muhammad Alnauval; Utan Rambutan – Andra Fembriarto	**Lifetime Achievement Award**: **Ade Irawan**

=== Films with multiple nominations and awards ===
Films that received multiple nominations
Nominations	Film
12	Memories of My Body
12	This Earth of Mankind
12	Two Blue Stripes
9	27 Steps of May
9	Glorious Days
9	Gundala
6	Cemara's Family
5	Ambu
4	My Stupid Boss 2
3	A Man Called Ahok
2	Milly & Mamet
2	Pocong: The Origin

Films that received multiple awards
Awards	Film
8	Memories of My Body
3	Gundala
2	Cemara's Family
2	Two Blue Stripes
