= Glorious Days (film) =

- Release poster
- Indonesian: Bebas
- Directed by: Riri Riza
- Written by: Gina S. Noer; Mira Lesmana
- Based on: Sunny by: Kang Hyeong-cheol; Lee Byeong-hyeon
- Produced by: Mira Lesmana
- Starring: Lutesha; Zulfa Maharani; Sheryl Sheinafia; Maizura; Agatha Pricilla; Baskara Mahendra; Widi Mulia; Susan Bachtiar; Marsha Timothy; Indy Barends; Baim Wong
- Cinematography: Gunnar Nimpuno
- Edited by: W. Ichwandiardono
- Music by: Lie Indra Perkasa
- Production companies: Miles Films; CJ Entertainment
- Release date: 3 October 2019
- Running time: 120 minutes
- Country: Indonesia
- Language: Indonesian

Glorious Days (Indonesian: Bebas; lit. Free) is a 2019 Indonesian buddy comedy film directed by Riri Riza. Produced by Miles Films and CJ Entertainment along with funding support from Ideosource Entertainment and BASE Entertainment, the film is an Indonesian-language remake of the 2011 South Korean film Sunny.

The film tells the story about Vina, a middle-aged woman who tries to fulfill her friend, Kris' wish of reuniting their high school clique. It alternates between two timelines: the present day and the 1990s when they were in high school.

== Premise ==
Kris, who is diagnosed with terminal cancer with two months left to live, wishes to reunite her high school clique, Geng Bebas, with the help of Vina, a fellow member.

== Cast ==
Present

- Marsha Timothy as Vina
- Susan Bachtiar as Kris
- Indy Barends as Jessica
- Widi Mulia as Gina
- Baim Wong as Jojo
- Salvita Decorte as Suci
- Oka Antara as Jaka
- Edward Suhadi as Dedi
- Darius Sinathrya as Adi, Vina's husband
- Syifa Hadju as Mia, Vina and Adi's daughter
- Reza Rahadian as Kris' notary

1990s

- Maizura as Vina
- Sheryl Sheinafia as Kris
- Agatha Pricilla as Jessica
- Zulfa Maharani as Gina
- Baskara Mahendra as Jojo
- Lutesha as Suci
- Kevin Ardilova as Jaka
- Brandon Salim as Dedi
- Sarah Sechan as Ambu, Vina's mother
- Irgy Fahrezy as Abah, Vina's father
- Giorgino Abraham as Andra

== Release ==
Glorious Days was released theatrically in Indonesia on 3 October 2019. The film garnered 161,104 moviegoers in its opening weekend, finishing second in the national box office. By the end of its run, the film garnered a total of 513,521 moviegoers and grossed Rp 20.5 billion ($1,436,010). Catchplay+ acquired the distribution rights to the film, releasing it on 2 February 2020. Glorious Days made its television premiere on SCTV on 1 January 2021, to coincide with New Year's Day. The film was also distributed through Netflix on 10 March 2022.

== Accolades ==
| Award | Date | Category | Recipient | Result | Ref. |
|---|---|---|---|---|---|
| Indonesian Film Festival | 8 December 2019 | Best Director | Riri Riza | Nominated | |
| Indonesian Film Festival | 8 December 2019 | Best Supporting Actor | Baskara Mahendra | Nominated | |
| Indonesian Film Festival | 8 December 2019 | Best Adapted Screenplay | Mira Lesmana and Gina S. Noer | Nominated | |
| Indonesian Film Festival | 8 December 2019 | Best Original Score | Lie Indra Perkasa | Nominated | |
| Indonesian Film Festival | 8 December 2019 | Best Theme Song | Dimas Wibisana, Bianca Nelwan and Mira Lesmana for "Aku Tanpamu" | Nominated | |
| Indonesian Film Festival | 8 December 2019 | Best Theme Song | Iwa K, R. Yudis Dwikorana and Toriawan Sudarsono for "Bebas" | Nominated | |
| Indonesian Film Festival | 8 December 2019 | Best Sound | Satrio Budiono and Sutrisno | Nominated | |
| Indonesian Film Festival | 8 December 2019 | Best Costume Design | Chitra Subiyakto and Gemailla Gea Geriantiana | Nominated | |
| Indonesian Film Festival | 8 December 2019 | Best Film Editing | W. Ichwandiardono | Nominated | |
