= Sivia Azizah =

Indonesian singer and actress (born 1997)

- Born: 14 February 1997 (age 29); Jakarta, Indonesia
- Occupations: Singer; songwriter; actress
- Years active: 2007–present
- Musical career
- Genres: Pop; R&B; soul
- Instruments: Vocals
- Formerly of: Blink

Sivia Azizah, known mononymously as SIVIA, (born 14 February 1997) is an Indonesian singer and actress. She rose to prominence as a member of the girl band Blink, formed in 2011. After the band disbanded in 2017, she took a two-year hiatus before starting a solo music career. She has since released a studio album and an extended play.

== Career ==
SIVIA started her acting career in 2007 by starring in the Trans7 soap opera Bawang Putih Bawang Merah. In 2008, SIVIA participated in the first season of the children's singing reality competition Idola Cilik and placed eighth. She was a member of the children's music group Fortunate Kids and won the Best Children's Music Duo/Group/Collaboration at the 2011 Anugerah Musik Indonesia.

In 2011, she became a member of the girl group Blink, with Febby Rastanty and Agatha Pricilla, also fellow Idola Cilik contestants, Ashilla Zahrantiara and Ify Alyssa. They starred in three soap operas on SCTV: Putih Abu-Abu, Diam-Diam Suka, and High School Love Story. The group disbanded in 2017. She took a two-year hiatus after the group disbanded and started recording music as a solo artist in mid-2019.

In September 2019, she released her debut solo single, "New York". She starred in a small role in Angga Dwimas Sasongko's One Day We'll Talk About Today. She released her debut solo studio album Love Spells in September 2020, incorporating R&B, soul, and pop music. In November 2020, Azizah was selected by Disney Indonesia along with Yura Yunita, Agatha Pricilla, and Nadin Amizah to release a cover of "Reflection" in support of the 2020 film Mulan. In 2021, she released an extended play Camellia.

== Personal life ==
SIVIA married Pria Hardie in June 2022, who was the muse for her 2021 extended play Camellia. She gave birth to a son in March 2023.

== Filmography ==
Film performances
Year	Title	Role	Notes
2015	Heart Beat	Lexa	
2017	Cahaya Cinta Pesantren	Aisyah	
2020	One Day We'll Talk About Today	Revina	

Television performances
Year	Title	Role	Network	Notes
2007	Bawang Putih Bawang Merah	Young Sisil	Trans7	
2009	Momon	Puspa	Global TV	
2012–2013	Putih Abu-Abu	Sivia	SCTV	
2013–2015	Diam-Diam Suka	Jessica	SCTV	
2015	High School Love Story	Fasola	SCTV	

== Discography ==
=== Studio albums ===
Title	Details
Love Spells	Released: 11 September 2020; Label: Sivia Music
Kenali, Pahami, Empati	Released: 30 July 2025; Label: Sivia Music

=== Extended plays ===
Title	Details
Camellia	Released: 17 September 2021; Label: Sivia Music

=== Singles ===
As lead artist

Title	Year	Album
"New York"	2019	Love Spells
"Storm"	2019	Love Spells
"Love Jokes"	2020	Love Spells
"Reflection" (with Yura Yunita, Nadin Amizah, and Agatha Pricilla)	2020	Non-album single
"Are You My Valentine?"	2021	Camellia
"Can We?" (with Frei)	2021	Non-album single
"Serene"	2021	Camellia
"Suara"	2022	Kenali, Pahami, Empati
"Bangkit (Apa yang Kau Takutkan?)"	2025	Kenali, Pahami, Empati

As featured artist

Title	Year	Album
"Rise" (Aditya, Rayi Putra and Tuan Tigabelas featuring Sivia)	2019	Non-album single
