= Kizuki =

Kizuki may refer to:

- Aoi Kizuki (born 1989), Japanese retired professional wrestler
- Minami Kizuki (born 1989), Japanese singer
- "Kizuki", an episode of the Japanese anime television series xxxHolic
- Kizuki, a character in Haruki Murakami's novel Norwegian Wood
- Kizuki as in the Twelve Kizuki, or Twelve Demon Moons, a group of elite demon henchmen in the anime and manga Demon Slayer: Kimetsu no Yaiba

== See also ==
- Kitsuki, Ōita, Japan
- Kisuki, Central Province, Kenya
- Kisuki, Shimane, former town in Japan
