= Agatha Pricilla =

Indonesian singer and actress (born 1997)

- Born: 30 September 1997 (age 29); Jakarta, Indonesia
- Occupations: Singer; actress
- Years active: 2006–present
- Musical career
- Genres: Pop; R&B; soul
- Instruments: Vocals
- Label: Sun Eater
- Formerly of: Blink

Agatha Pricilla (born 30 September 1997) is an Indonesian singer and actress. She rose to prominence as a member of the girl group Blink, formed in 2011. Since the group disbandment in 2017, she has released music as a solo artist and spawned two extended plays.

== Career ==
In 2006, Pricilla began her music career by taking vocal lessons at the Purwa Caraka Music Studio. As a child, she became the chorister of the PCMS Choir. In the same year, he won a vocal group competition held during the SanremoJunior in Sanremo, Italy. In 2007 and 2008, she starred in the annual musicals, Operet Bobo, held by children's magazine Bobo.

In 2011, she became a member of the girl group, Blink, with Febby Rastanty, Sivia Azizah, Ashilla Zahrantiara, and Ify Alyssa. The group disbanded in 2017.

In 2019, she signed a recording contract with independent record label Sun Eater and released her debut single as a solo artist titled "You're Still Her". She starred in Riri Riza's Glorious Days and sang the soundtrack "Bebas" with Iwa K, Sheryl Sheinafia, and Maizura. In 2020, Pricilla collaborated with pop singer Rayhan Noor to release an extended play Colors. In November 2020, Pricilla was selected by Disney Indonesia along with Yura Yunita, Sivia Azizah, and Nadin Amizah to release a cover of "Reflection" in support of the 2020 film Mulan. In 2022, she released the lead single of then-upcoming extended play titled "Ruang".

In 2023, she released an extended play Adriana, titled after her mother's name. She starred as the leading role in Netflix original series Ex-Addicts Club.

== Filmography ==
Film performances
Year	Title	Role	Notes
2015	Heart Beat	Agatha	
2019	Glorious Days	Jessica	

Television performances
Year	Title	Role	Network	Notes
2012–2013	Putih Abu-Abu	Pricilla	SCTV	
2013	Cinta RockStar	Jana	SCTV	
2013–2015	Diam-Diam Suka	Annabelle	SCTV	
2015	High School Love Story	Annabelle	SCTV	
2019	The Trilogy of Senses	Vania	YouTube	
2022	Cinta di Balik Awan	Jessica	Vision+	Episode: "Per'Jamu'An"
2022	Mulih	Aiko	YouTube	
2023	Ex-Addicts Club	Raysa Nathania	Netflix	
2023	The Aces	Wina	Amazon Prime Video	

== Discography ==
=== Extended plays ===
Title	Details
Colors (with Rayhan Noor)	Released: 27 November 2020; Label: Sun Eater
Adriana	Released: 26 May 2023; Label: Sun Eater

=== Singles ===
As lead artist

Title	Year	Album
"You're Still Her"	2019	Non-album singles
"Desire"	2019	Non-album singles
"Bebas" (with Iwa K, Sheryl Sheinafia and Maizura)	2019	Non-album singles
"Chimera" (featuring Popsickle)	2020	Non-album singles
"Mata Air"	2020	Non-album singles
"Colors" (with Rayhan Noor)	2020	Colors
"Sick in Love" (with Rayhan Noor)	2020	Colors
"Strangers Once Again" (with Rayhan Noor)	2020	Colors
"Reflection" (with Yura Yunita, Sivia Azizah, and Nadin Amizah)	2020	Non-album singles
"Esok Siapa Tau"	2021	Non-album singles
"Ruang"	2022	Adriana
"Cipta di Batas Rasa" / "Lepas Berdansa" (with Mondo Gascaro)	2022	Non-album singles
"One Day"	2023	Adriana

As featured artist

Title	Year	Album
"Peace of Mind" (Mantra Vutura featuring Agatha Pricilla)	2019	Human

=== Guest appearances ===
Title	Year	Other artist(s)	Album
"Semua Tentangmu Aku Percaya"	2021	Somewhere Somewhere	Satu Demi Satu
