= Loyal Brave True =

Single by Christina Aguilera

from the album Mulan (Original Motion Picture Soundtrack)
- Released: March 6, 2020
- Genre: Pop
- Length: 2:46
- Label: Walt Disney Records
- Songwriters: Billy Crabtree; Harry Gregson-Williams; Rosi Golan; Jamie Hartman
- Producer: Jamie Hartman

Christina Aguilera singles chronology
| "Fall on Me" (2019) | "Loyal Brave True" (2020) | "Reflection" (2020) |

Music video
- "Loyal Brave True" on YouTube

"Loyal Brave True" is a song recorded by American singer Christina Aguilera, taken from the soundtrack to the 2020 action drama film Mulan. The song was written by Billy Crabtree, Harry Gregson-Williams, Rosi Golan, and producer Jamie Hartman. It was released as a single on March 6, 2020, by Walt Disney Records. "Loyal Brave True" received a nomination for the Soundtrack Song of 2020 at the 46th People's Choice Awards. It was also shortlisted as one of fifteen potential nominees for the Academy Award for Best Original Song.

== Background and composition ==
The song is a pop ballad, written by Billy Crabtree, Harry Gregson-Williams, Jamie Hartman and Rosi Golan. Hartman, who also produced "Loyal Brave True", has previously worked with Aguilera on her seventh studio album Lotus (2012), writing and co-producing a dance-pop song "Army of Me". It was Mitchell Leib, the president of music and soundtracks for the Walt Disney Studios, who opted Aguilera for the project, as she already recorded a song, the pop version of "Reflection" for the original 1998 Mulan; another version recorded by her for 2020 film would be released her next single. As Gregson-Williams disclosed, "From the demo to the final song, there was a massive leap in the intensity of the song, mainly due to the fact that Christina was going to sing it."

Hartman and Gregson-Williams incorporated classic Chinese music influences in the song—one of the instruments used during the recording sessions was guzheng.

== Critical reception ==
In April 2020, Entertainment Focus named "Loyal Brave True" one of the best pop songs of the year so far. Entertainment Weekly editor Joey Nolfi praised Aguilera for her "powerhouse vocals", while Bianca Gracie of Billboard believed that the song is "filled with the undeniable warrior spirit we've all come to love Mulan for, but also updates the lead character's story for the 21st century". Bleeding Cool's Jeremy Konrad stated that Aguilera's strong voice "matches what is increasingly looking like an epic, powerful film". After the nominations for the 93rd Academy Awards were announced, Kory Grow of Rolling Stone wrote that the song was "surprisingly snubbed" for Best Original Song.

== Music videos ==
Lyric videos for both "Loyal Brave True" and its Spanish-language version, "El Mejor Guerrero", premiered on YouTube on March 6, 2020, along with the single. A short teaser of the music video for "Loyal Brave True" was publicized on August 13, and the next day the video was released in its full form. A Spanish-language video for "El Mejor Guerrero" premiered on YouTube's DisneyMusicVEVO channel simultaneously.

== Cover versions ==
In November 2021, Pamela Yuri covered the song on the tenth season of a reality talent show The Voice Brasil. The same year it was performed by Gabriela Marszał during the blind auditions of The Voice Kids Poland.

== Accolades ==
| Year | Ceremony | Category | Result | Ref. |
|---|---|---|---|---|
| 2020 | People's Choice Awards | The Soundtrack Song of 2020 | Nominated | |
| 2021 | Academy Awards | Best Original Song | Shortlisted | |
| 2021 | Chicago Indie Critics Awards | Best Original Song | Nominated | |

== Credits and personnel ==
Personnel

- Christina Aguilera – vocals
- Jamie Hartman – songwriting, production
- Billy Crabtree – songwriting
- Harry Gregson-Williams – songwriting
- Rosi Golan – songwriting
- Manny Marroquin – mixing

Credits adapted from Tidal.

== Charts ==
=== Weekly charts ===
| Chart (2020) | Peak position |
|---|---|
| Canada Digital Song Sales (Billboard) | 45 |
| Scotland (OCC) | 61 |
| UK Download (OCC) | 49 |
| US Adult Contemporary (Billboard) | 10 |
| US Digital Song Sales (Billboard) | 24 |

=== Year-end charts ===
| Chart (2020) | Position |
|---|---|
| US Adult Contemporary (Billboard) | 41 |

| Chart (2021) | Position |
|---|---|
| US Adult Contemporary (Billboard) | 43 |
