= Memories of My Body =

2018 Indonesian film

- Indonesian theatrical release poster
- Indonesian: Kucumbu Tubuh Indahku
- Directed by: Garin Nugroho
- Screenplay by: Garin Nugroho
- Produced by: Ifa Isfansyah
- Starring: Muhammad Khan; Sujiwo Tejo; Teuku Rifnu Wikana; Randy Pangalila; Endah Laras
- Cinematography: Gay Hian Teoh
- Music by: Mondo Gascaro
- Production companies: Fourcolors Films; Go-Studio
- Distributed by: Asian Shadows
- Release dates: 6 September 2018 (Venice); 16 February 2019 (Indonesia (uncut version)); 18 April 2019 (Indonesia (cut version))
- Running time: 107 minutes
- Country: Indonesia
- Language: Javanese

Memories of My Body (Indonesian: Kucumbu Tubuh Indahku) is a 2018 Indonesian Javanese-language coming-of-age drama film directed by Garin Nugroho and produced by Ifa Isfansyah. The film tells the story of a dancer in the Lengger tradition, revolving around his introduction to it and finding his self-identity. The plot is loosely based on dancer Rianto's life; Rianto also stars in the film. The ensemble cast is Muhammad Khan, Sujiwo Tejo, Teuku Rifnu Wikana, Randy Pangalila, and Endah Laras.

It premiered internationally before in Indonesia. During its theatrical release, the film's team experienced obstacles from the general public such as two Change.org petitions wanting the film to be cancelled due to a perception that the film promoted morals inconsistent with Indonesia's common culture, namely LGBT elements, which became the reason of positive reviews by critics and portions of the general public. The film was banned in Padang, Palembang, Pekanbaru, Depok, Garut, Pontianak, and Kubu Raya. Nugroho took offence to the controversy. The film was the Indonesian entry for the Best International Feature Film at the 92nd Academy Awards.

== Plot ==
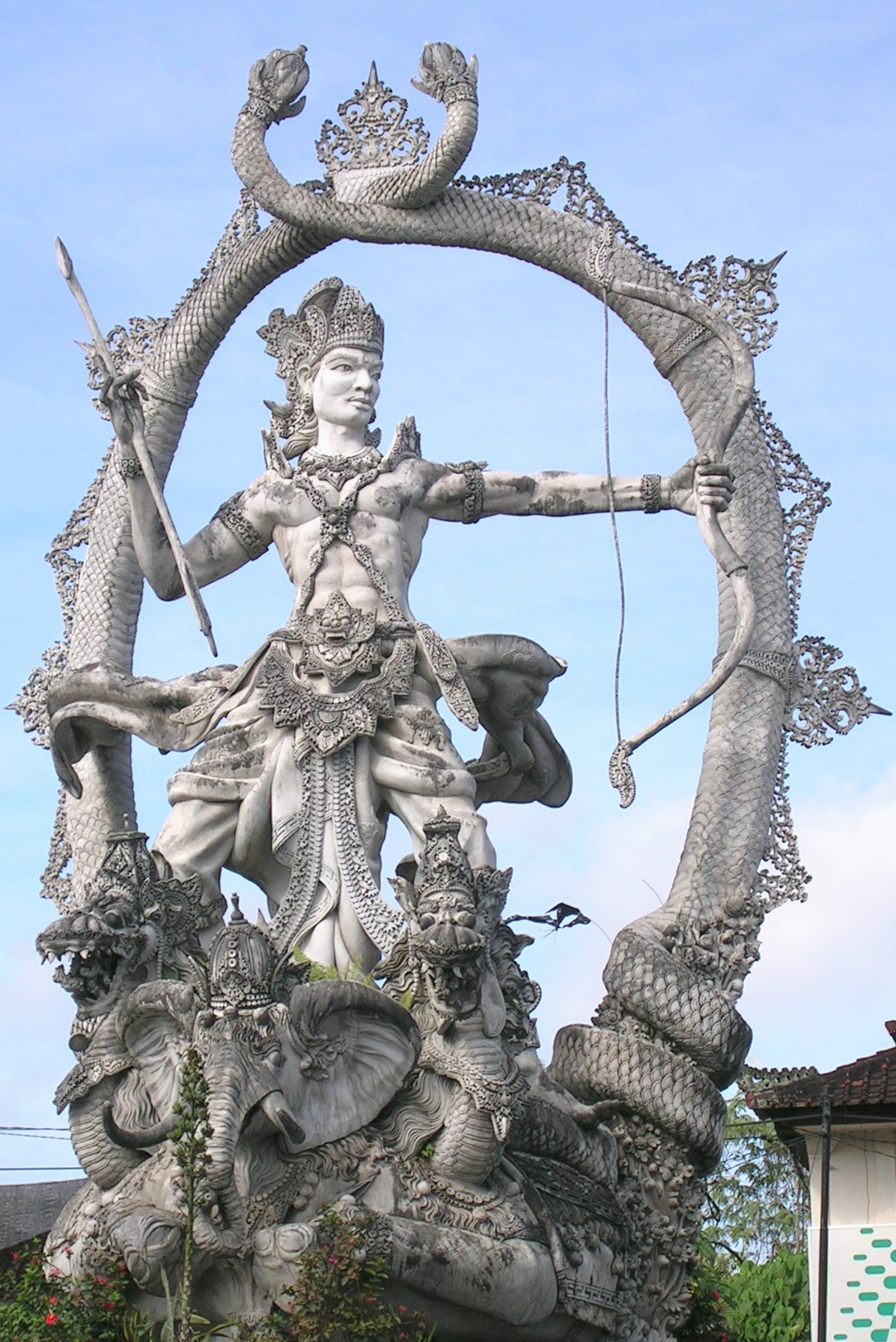
In Memories of My Body, the main character, Juno, is derived from Arjuna

Memories of My Body's main character's name, Wahyu Juno, is derived from the name Arjuna, the strong, divine protagonist of the epic poem Mahabharata. Nicknamed Juno, he lives in a village in Banyumas Regency, where a person's body is regarded as the archive of their life, carrying education, emotion, and trauma as they go on with their life. The local lengger dance, which involves men cross-dressing, is derived from "leng", meaning "hole" (a reference to the vagina), and "ger", meaning "comb" (a reference to the penis); thus, the word highlights the masculinity and femininity within humans.

In the 1980s, young Juno's father leaves him inexplicably. Out of admiration, he begins learning lengger from a dance teacher; he also begins his sexual exploration. He witnesses the teacher killing the student Jok for having sex with his wife. Upon his father's request, Juno's aunt Atmo takes him. She learns that he can detect chickens' fertility by inserting his finger into the genitals, much to her vexation. He is punished by a teacher for spreading odor, and is asked to write an apology with a chalk in his mouth, to which he writes "MOM." (Note: Indonesian: IBU.) A dance teacher rescues and teaches him lengger. Noticing that Juno wants to touch her cleavage, missing his mother, she allows him, and the villagers take her to police, citing pedophilia. Exhausted, Atmo gives Juno to his uncle.

As an adult, Juno works for his clothing store, able to measure a person's body with his senses. One day, a boxer orders a traditional wedding costume. He requests that Juno demonstrate how to wear it. When the man accidentally bleeds his chest with a safety pin, he sucks it, and Juno realizes he is gay. As the eldest of a plethora of siblings, the man never gets to spend time with himself or cuddle with his mother, exacerbated by poverty. In a fit of closeness, they kiss. The man loses a boxing match, thus not being able to garner money for his wedding and the boss of a controlling enemy, whose fixer separates him and Juno. The next day, Juno's uncle reveals that his father left due to trauma upon a river nearby his house, where his family was slaughtered out of slander that he was involved in the 30 September Movement. After his uncle dies, Juno moves to Jati village to be costume designer of a lengger group.

Anticipating the election, a regent candidate is advised by shaman Pesisiran to find a mate that will spiritually allow him to win. Juno, the mate, rejects the instruction. A warok blocks his plan to reconcile with the regent (who is furious that the reog group cancelled further political dances) by choosing Juno as his gemblak (male lover), noticing a close connection; Juno accepts, and they bond. The regent's wife hires fixers to kick Juno and the lengger group out of the village, worrying that a photo of the regent and Juno holding hands may cause the majority, homophobic villagers to not vote for him. A relative confronts the wife for abuse of power, saying that she will be lonely. The group absconds before the fixers arrive. Juno hitchhikes and smiles, now out of the closet.

== Cast ==
- Muhammad Khan as Juno
  - Raditya Evandra as little Juno
- Rianto as The Dancer
- Sujiwo Tejo as the Lengger instructor
- Teuku Rifnu Wikana as the regent
- Randy Pangalila as the boxer
- Whani Dharmawan as the warok
- Endah Laras as Juno's aunt
- Dwi Windarti as the dance teacher

== Production ==
"Rianto―I think―because of he's from the village, and he is study in art school, also he stay in Japan [...] is mean you can see the ordinary village person, but he also have experien[ce] in the global world [...] [So] everything become natural [...] And it has become wonderful."

— Garin Nugroho, when asked in the IFFR about casting Rianto

Memories of My Body is the 19th film made by Garin Nugroho. Pre-production took two months, principal photography took two weeks, and post-production took another two months. Nugroho claims the film is his fastest film to be produced. He also said that part of the script is loosely based on the life of Rianto, a dancer native to Banyumas who now stays in Japan. Nugroho has known Rianto since 2015 and has worked with him to make a short film called Mangir based on a fable of the same name by Pramoedya Ananta Toer, a writer known for his historic novel This Earth of Mankind. They also worked together in making a choreography titled "Medium". As their friendship goes on, Nugroho gets a full picture of Rianto's life and decided to make the film. Despite that, the film is not fully inspired by him; some elements are based on Nugroho's life. When told about the film, Rianto is reported to be surprised; he then enters the project. Rianto also became the choreographer for several cast members, including Muhammad Khan. Nugroho also stayed in the same room with Rianto throughout principal photography; they chatted about Khan's role every night.

Translating the title Kucumbu Tubuh Indahku (lit. I Make Out with My Beautiful Body) to English took a considerably long time, as there are many challenges in translating such a poetic title to an understandable English title. Producer Ifa Isfansyah had 10 titles to choose from; one of them was Through the Hole (Indonesian: Lewat Lubang). Eventually, they settled with Memories of My Body (Indonesian: Ingatan-ingatan Akan Tubuhku).

== Themes ==
According to CNN Indonesia, Memories of My Body reflects the diverse Indonesian society with its xenophobic attitudes causing hardships in life for those who are different. The main character has a marginalized sexual orientation and lives in a passive society, which later leads to difficulty in communicating. When he decides to express his feelings through dancing in a local tribe, it still fails to convince society to be accepting. CNN Indonesia favorably contrasts the movie's perceived realism with La La Land, which is criticized as being set in an overly utopian society.

The film was also said to be a criticism of egotistical politicians. In reality, there are indeed minority groups being oppressed instead of getting equal rights. In Indonesia, various cultures have been disowned as they were perceived as "Communist, occult, or rebelling against religion."

== Release ==
Memories of my Body premiered at the 75th Venice International Film Festival in 2018; Other international screenings include the 2018 Three Continents Festival in Nantes, France, as well as Teatro Farnese in Rome, Italy, from 23 to 26 May 2019; the screening in Rome was part of the 70th anniversary celebration of Indonesia's diplomatic relationship with Italy. It also screened at the Holland Festival from 11 to 12 June 2018, as well as the nearby IFFR in 2019. Other festivals screening the film included the Busan International, Hong Kong Lesbian & Gay, Göteborg, Guadalajara International, Vilnius International, Locarno, Frameline, Singapore International, and Tel Aviv International LGBT Film Festival. It also screened at the Oldham Theater, Singapore, on 10 January 2020.

Locally in Indonesia, the film premiered at the 2018 Jogja-NETPAC Asian Film Festival on 13 December. It was then theatrically released on 18 April 2019 along with two other Indonesian films, Pocong the Origin and Rumput Tetangga, after a one-month delay in release schedules. Due to its taboo topic, the film was only screened in 40 theaters in Indonesia, with each theater playing it between one and three times a day. Film Indonesia recorded that the film got 8,082 unique viewers in just a week.

There were two versions of the film distributed by the Indonesian Film Censorship Board (LSF). The first version is an edited version of it that is rated 17+ and passed censor on 13 December 2018. The second version in unedited one rated 21+ that passed censor on 23 January 2019; nowhere but at the Plaza Indonesia Film Festival on 16 February is the unedited version screened. The head of the LSF, Ahmad Yani Basuki, had personal considerations that allowed the film to be qualified for release, and he refused to believe that the LSF's article on the film may indirectly promote LGBT. Ahmad stated that the film contains morals that can be taught for a mature individual; he sees the depiction of the masculine character cross-dressing and acting feminine tolerable by the general public. Adrian Jonathan Pasaribu of publication Cinema Poetica says that the film is worthy of screening all across Indonesia, reminding the public that the LSF is not responsible for territorial screenings. Adrian says that there are no elements of the film that could convert youth to LGBT.

The film does not screen in typical theatres initially but in film festivals instead, because it does not prioritize money and the box office. Ifa says that the film might not be regularly released due to the general public's inability to prioritize a film's art instead of its elements. The film needed to be screened at a large festival; thus, it was released at the Venice International Film Festival.

From 12 to 17 December 2019, Memories of My Body rescreened itself in three CGV Cinema theaters in Jakarta.

== Critical response ==
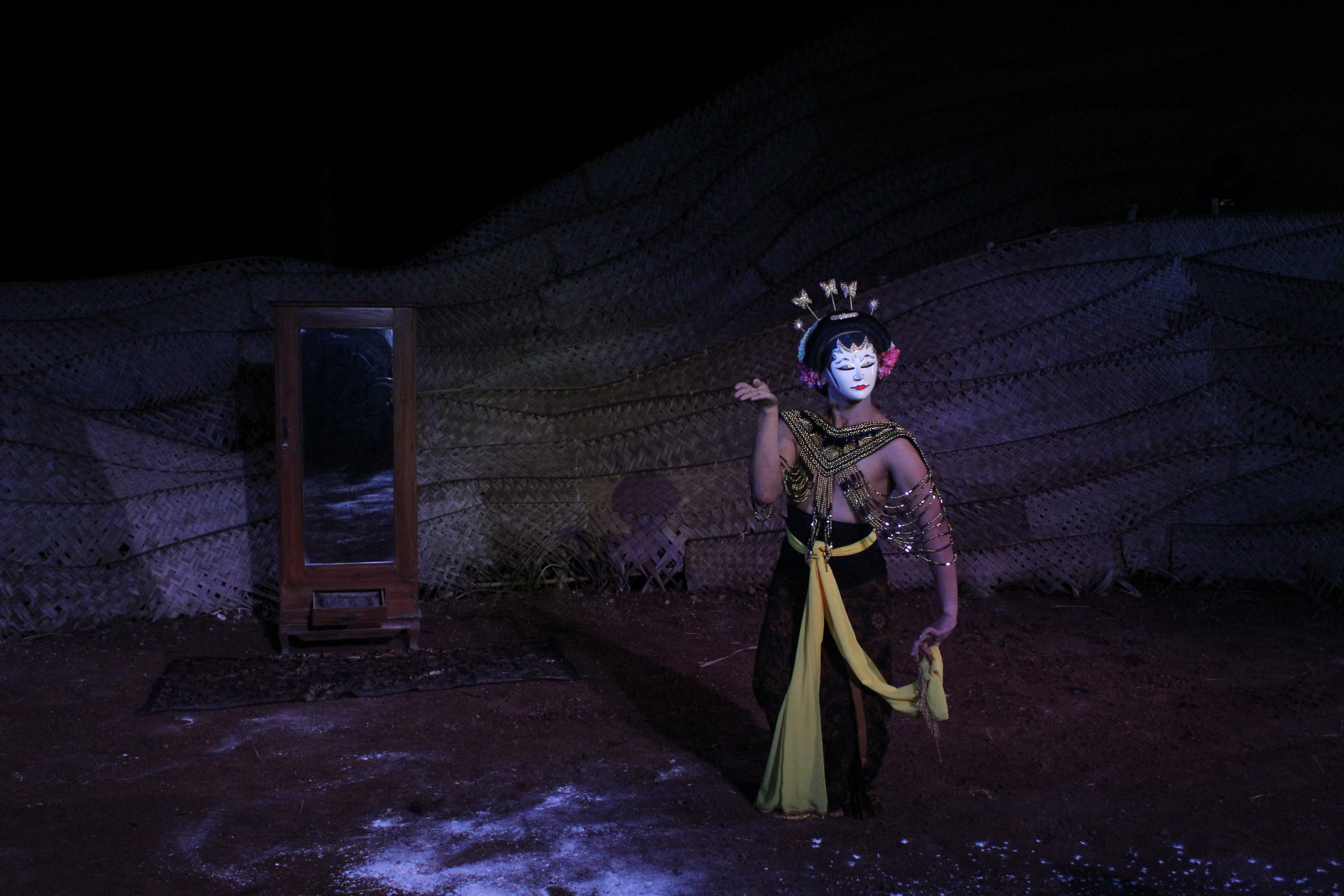
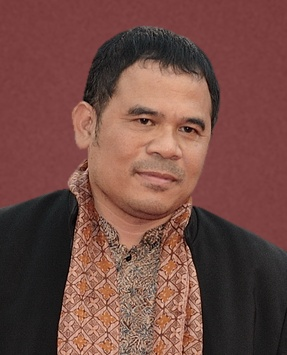
Rianto (left), the inspiration for the film, says that the film by Garin Nugroho (right) is for and about "all the Riantos in Indonesia."

The film received positive response by the general public and the media. Other than regarding its LGBT elements, it is also praised for its historical references to the 1980s. Endro Priherdityo of CNN Indonesia praised Nugroho in his efforts to tell a wider story than just a casual dancer but also discrimination towards a culture, also marking it as Nugroho's best film. Media Indonesia also praised him for bringing light to the issue of gender discrimination. The IFDC praised it for glorifying and encouraging freedom of speech in such taboo topic. A writer of The Jakarta Post noted it as one of the best films made after the New Order. A German critic called Memories of My Body "an alienating-looking artificiality." Another critic, after watching the film in Venice, wrote that Nugroho "takes a path in full line with this artistic syncretism, adding cinema as a meta-artistic structure that encompasses all the arts." In the film, according to them, "sexuality is intertwined with art, with the infinite possibility of the arts." Other than calling it a "striking poetic imagery out of the socially and sexually conscious material and strikes a delicate balance between his trademark aesthetics," The Hollywood Reporter wrote:

While the pic thrives on its socially charged script and its cast's nuanced performances — especially Evandra's depiction of the protagonist as a confused boy and Khan's turn as the older Juno — Nugroho also benefits from Teoh Gay Hian's emotive camerawork and the period details of Ong Hari Wahyu's production design. At once evoking the gritty realities of agrarian Indonesia while also celebrating the richness of its folk culture, Memories of My Body offers a complex picture of the conflicting social and historical traumas concealed within the bodies and minds of marginalized, oppressed social groups in a nominally secular country.

== Controversy ==
On 16 April, Ifa stated that the film would not be boycotted because it focuses on a coming-of-age story rather than LGBT issues. Ifa performed a risk-benefit analysis on it. However eight days later, there were two Change.org petitions made, titled (translated): "Emergency! Indonesia is now making an LGBT film called "Kucumbu Tubuh Indahku"" by Budi Robantoro and "Cancel the Release of LGBT film titled "Kucumbu Tubuh Indahku" Directed by Garin Nugroho" by Rakhmi Mashita. As a result, the trailer of the film caused mixed reviews by the netizens; some supported the release of the film, while others did not. The Vice President of the Indonesian Ulema Council's (MUI) Youth and Family Commission Arovah Windiani asked the film not to be released, calling it immoral.

Depok's regent, Idris Abdul Somad, banned Memories of My Body in the city he controls, also leaning towards LGBT elements of the film. He also wrote a formal letter to the Indonesian Broadcasting Commission (KPI) to ban the film nationwide. Somad was supported by MUI's President Garut Sirojul Munir, worrying that the film will bring a negative effect to millennials whilst asking all Muslims to pray more as Ramadan neared. The film is also banned in West Kalimantan, specifically in Pontianak and Kubu Raya. Pontianak's regent, Edi Rusdi, reportedly wrote three letters to three different institutions: the Ayani Mega Mall, the West Kalimantan KPI, as well as the Mayor of West Kalimantan, Sutarmidji, on 26 and 27 April, saying that he wanted to protect children from domestic violence and abuse, as well as protecting the general public. He also wanted the film to be abandoned by the general public not to cause an individual to become a member of the LGBT community. Muda Mahandrawan, Kubu Raya's regent, also wrote a letter after witnessing the trailer three times in three different media. He also stated that the film is against religious teachings and that it may cause conversion in an individual. In Balikpapan, several Islamic organizations, in particular the Islamic Defenders Front, boycotted the film in the city.

On the island of Sumatra, Ratu Dewa, Palembang's city secretary, asked the KPI of South Sumatra to ban the film in the said territory on 29 April due to its apparent promotion of LGBT. Like Muda, she also had the idea after watching the film trailer. Pekanbaru's regent, Firdaus, wrote a letter the following week, thinking that it might wreak havoc on the general public. Firdaus claimed that the film is robust in its elements on LGBT, and is against religious teachings. He said that there is no morality whatsoever infused in the film. The next day, Padang's regent Mahyeldi Ansharullah wrote a letter to the Indonesian Film Censorship Board showing disgust towards the film, opposing it with similar reasons stated by other politicians. The Islamic Defenders Front also cancelled further screening of the film in Bandar Lampung; they initially screamed in front of the building and were let in by fearful officers. In a footage, the Front threatened the building's managers to have them arrested if they were caught screening any taboo films in the future. The audiences were told that the film could not be screened further due to restrictions. One of the managers criticized the Front for their actions and asked them to watch the film before accusing it. The audiences, who were mostly students, were disappointed with the Front, as they were "simply appreciating Indonesia's culture," and that "there's no concerning [scenes] so far."

=== Response ===
KPI stated that they will not manage those problems raised by politicians earlier. Nugroho stated that the controversy proves that Indonesia is not ready to be mature towards taboo topics such as LGBT, and he says that he is "ready to fight even when [he] is threatened to be murdered." He questioned the inconsistency of the general public for not boycotting Bohemian Rhapsody, a 2018 biopic film about Freddie Mercury, also with LGBT elements, which was played in many regions in Indonesia.

Nugroho stated that Memories of My Body's contra is an example of the general public judging without actually knowing what they are talking about. He was also disappointed by the mass anarchy without any dialogue and process that may influence the mindedness of future generations as well as the openness to be free from discrimination and democratic violence. He gave the example of Opera Jawa, which was also contested by the World Hindu Youth Organization, calling it stupid, even when the film received positive reviews by the Hindu community in Bali, where the religion is dominant. He also brought up Soegija, a 2012 epic film by Nugroho as well, which received controversy due to its strength in the ability to possibly convert a person. Ifa said that the opposition of the film is caused by the dilemma of recent Indonesian culture, where the Muslim community is divided on Sufism or Wahhabism. In the Wahhabi teachings, one must follow the Arab culture to oppose Indonesia's signature culture as well as the arts of Hinduism and Buddhism. Rianto, in an interview with BBC Indonesia, argues "From its start to its end, there's no such thing as LGBT promotion. This is my motherland's culture."

Ifa said that the boycotters who signed the two Change.org petitions were more than the viewers. Ifa said that he does not know whether this is the effect of a mass flag or the effect of Avengers: Endgame dominating the Indonesian box office, although in Jakarta, Endgame only screened at two theatres at the time due to its over domination. Other directors such as Hanung Bramantyo, Ernest Prakasa, and Joko Anwar stated that the boycotting of the film reflects the thriving intolerance in Indonesia.

In response to the controversy, Aktivis Women's March supported Nugroho and also talked about Nugroho's response towards the controversy. Airlangga University sociology teacher Bagong Suyanto stated that the film's controversy is not new to Indonesia as in the last few years, as there have been debates related to the presence of the LGBT community in Indonesia. Another sociologist, Sigit Rochadi, said that the film is incapable of converting a person to a different sexuality. Endro Priherdityo of CNN Indonesia humiliates those who agreed on Indonesia's diversity, but fail to accept all the cultures present. The Indonesian Film Directors Club (IFDC) similarized the film with films that was qualified but received such close-minded controversy: Pocong, Suster Keramas, Cin(T)a, Perempuan Berkalung Sorban, ?, Cinta Tapi Beda, Naura & Genk Juara, and Dilan 1991. Tirto.id called the controversy a decadence.

== Soundtrack ==
Kucumbu Tubuh Indahku: Original Motion Picture Soundtrack

Soundtrack album by Mondo Gascaro
- Released: 13 December 2018 (digital download)
- Length: 36:22
- Language: Indonesian
- Labels: Ivy League Music; Signature Music Indonesia

Mondo Gascoro chronology
Rajakelana (2016)	Kucumbu Tubuh Indahku: Original Motion Picture Soundtrack (2018)

Soundtrack composer Mondo Gascaro released an album of the same name, which is mostly filled with remakes of pre-existing songs like "Hanya Semalam" (lit. "Only One Night") and "Rindu Lukisan" (lit. "The Heart of a Painting) by Ismail Marzuki as well as "Apatis" (lit. "Pessimistic"), which was popularized by Benny Subardja in the 1970s.

The soundtrack's cover art depicted a Lengger dancer behind the yellow walls (as background) dancing; the dancer's body reflected as a shadow. The soundtrack was praised by Grain, calling Mondo "advancing traditional values and able to convey the movie's feelings using his." Tracks with Rianto credited are spoken or chanted by Rianto in the film and are original audio clips from the film.

The soundtrack album was released digitally and physically, specifically on compact disc by labels Ivy Music League and Signature Music Indonesia. The digital version was released in correspondence with its premiere in the Jogja-NETPAC Film Festival.

All music is composed by Mondo Gascoro, unless noted.

No.	Title	Music	Length
1.	"Leng"	Mondo Gascoro, Rianto	2:41
2.	"Bimbang Tanpa Pegangan"	Danilla	4:07
3.	"Tubuh dan Hasrat"	Mondo Gascoro, Rianto	1:44
4.	"Hanya Semalam"	Endah Laras	3:43
5.	"Godong Bayem"	Rianto	1:46
6.	"Dari Seberang"		3:08
7.	"Into the Clouds, Out of the Ocean"		4:14
8.	"Rindu Lukisan"	Tilly Haryanto	4:09
9.	"Padang Kurusetra"	Mondo Gascoro, Rianto	4:36
10.	"Jangkrik"	Rianto	1:03
11.	"Apatis"		5:11
Total length:			36:22

== Accolades ==
Memories of My Body was selected as the Indonesian entry for the Best International Feature Film at the 92nd Academy Awards, but it was not nominated. It was Nugroho's second film to be entered for selection in the awards, after Daun di Atas Bantal. Initially, Nugroho stated that he did not have big expectations when it was entered, and said, "a good film will find its own way."

Award	Date of ceremony	Category	Recipient(s)/Nominee(s)	Result	Ref.
Adelaide Film Festival	20 October 2018	International Best Feature	Memories of My Body	Nominated	
Asia Pacific Screen Awards	29 November 2018	UNESCO Award	Memories of My Body	Won	
Guadalajara International Film Festival	8-15 March 2019	Premio Maguey	Memories of My Body	Nominated	
Guadalajara International Film Festival	8-15 March 2019	Honorific Mention	Memories of My Body	Won	
Indonesian Film Festival	8 December 2019	Best Picture	Ifa Isfansyah	Won	
Indonesian Film Festival	8 December 2019	Best Director	Garin Nugroho	Won	
Indonesian Film Festival	8 December 2019	Best Leading Actor	Muhammad Khan	Won	
Indonesian Film Festival	8 December 2019	Best Supporting Actor	Whani Dharmawan	Won	
Indonesian Film Festival	8 December 2019	Best Supporting Actor	Randy Pangalila	Nominated	
Indonesian Film Festival	8 December 2019	Best Original Screenplay	Garin Nugroho	Nominated	
Indonesian Film Festival	8 December 2019	Best Original Score	Ramondo Gascaro	Won	
Indonesian Film Festival	8 December 2019	Best Sound	Khikmawan Santosa and Dicky Permana	Nominated	
Indonesian Film Festival	8 December 2019	Best Art Direction	Edy Wibowo	Won	
Indonesian Film Festival	8 December 2019	Best Makeup and Hairstyling	Retno Ratih Damayanti	Nominated	
Indonesian Film Festival	8 December 2019	Best Costume Design	Retno Ratih Damayanti	Nominated	
Indonesian Film Festival	8 December 2019	Best Editing	Greg Araya	Won	
Venice International Film Festival	29 August-8 September 2018	Venice Horizons Award	Memories of My Body	Nominated	
Venice International Film Festival	29 August-8 September 2018	Queer Lion	Memories of My Body	Nominated	

== See also ==
- List of submissions to the 92nd Academy Awards for Best International Feature Film
- List of Indonesian submissions for the Academy Award for Best International Feature Film

=== Plot ===
- Gemblak, cultural element hinted in the film
- Reog, a tradition of the village's dance group
