= Mulan (2020 soundtrack) =

Mulan (Original Motion Picture Soundtrack)

Soundtrack album by Harry Gregson-Williams
- Released: September 4, 2020
- Recorded: 2019–2020
- Genre: Film soundtrack
- Length: 86:24
- Label: Walt Disney Records
- Producer: Harry Gregson-Williams; Tom Howe; Stephanie Economou

Harry Gregson-Williams chronology
Penguins (2019)	Mulan (2020)	The Last Duel (2021)

Singles from Mulan (Original Motion Picture Soundtrack)
- 1. "Loyal Brave True" Released: March 6, 2020; 2. "Reflection" Released: August 28, 2020

Mulan (Original Motion Picture Soundtrack) is the soundtrack to the 2020 film of the same name, which is a live-action adaptation of the identically named 1998 animated musical adventure film. Unlike the original version, the film did not reuse any songs from the former, but instead used instrumental version of the tracks. Harry Gregson-Williams, who previously worked with Caro on The Zookeeper's Wife, composed the film's score with additional music by Tom Howe and Stephanie Economou, while also adapted the original themes composed by Jerry Goldsmith for the 1998 film. The soundtrack album was released by Walt Disney Records on September 4, 2020.

== Background ==
The remake does not feature any songs from the original film, and instead uses instrumental versions of the original film's songs. Caro later explained that the songs were deleted because she felt their use did not fit with her realistic vision of the film; she believes that since people do not break out into song as they enter war, the film should not either. Though she still tried to "honour the music from the animation in a very significant way," as she did not want to disrespect the original film; however, she stated she could not find a place to use the original music. Producer Jason T. Reed clarified Caro's previous statement by saying that the songs would be featured "in a slightly different way" in the remake.

Gregson-Williams confirmed to be a part of the film's project in August 2018 and composition for the film began during late-2019. All the scores were written in context from Mulan's point of view. He opted for using strings and wind instruments, deferring from his electronic and orchestral music, he usually worked, as to authenticate the ancient Chinese music, although minor cues of orchestra being added in the score. He adapted the original themes of Jerry Goldsmith for the 1998 film, which he called it as a "privileged" and "daunting" challenge. For the battle sequences, where huge drums are being played, Caro asked Gregson-Williams to write some drum patterns that could be played on location, which would signal different elements of the Imperial army throughout the battle sequences, and Williams asked for "drummers who could act" rather than "actors who could drum".

Christina Aguilera, who previously performed an end-credits version of "Reflection" for the original film, recorded a new version of "Reflection," as well as new material for the remake's soundtrack.

== Singles and album release ==
On March 6, 2020, Aguilera released a new single for the film's soundtrack, titled "Loyal Brave True." The song was written by Jamie Hartman, Harry Gregson-Williams, Rosi Golan and Billy Crabtree, and produced by Jamie Hartman. The song was also released in Spanish, as "El Mejor Guerrero." Additionally, the singer confirmed that she would also release a re-recorded version of "Reflection." On March 8, a Mandarin-version of the song, titled "自己" ("Zìjǐ"), performed by Yifei Liu was released, while Aguilera's English version was issued later the same year, on August 28. The album was originally scheduled for release on March 25, but as the film's original March 27, 2020 release was deferred due to the COVID-19 pandemic, the soundtrack release was put on hold. On April 1, 2020, the track list of the original soundtrack was unveiled claiming that the album will release coinciding with the final theatrical release date. The soundtrack was released on September 4, coinciding with the theatrical and video-on-demand release through Disney+ Premier Access.

== Track listing ==
Credits adapted from Tidal.

No.	Title	Performer	Length
1.	"Ancestors"		3:21
2.	"Tulou Courtyard (Extended)"		3:14
3.	"The Desert Garrison"		3:27
4.	"Böri Khan & Xianniang"		1:37
5.	"The Lesson of the Phoenix"		3:14
6.	"Honor to Us All" (Originally written by Matthew Wilder and David Zippel)		1:54
7.	"The Matchmaker"		2:30
8.	"Mulan Leaves Home"		3:50
9.	"Four Ounces Can Move a Thousand Pounds"		3:40
10.	"Mulan Rides into Battle (Extended)"		5:41
11.	"Honghui (Extended)"		1:34
12.	"Training the Men"		3:02
13.	"Mulan & Honghui Fight"		1:25
14.	"Oath of the Warrior"		1:24
15.	"The Witch"		3:42
16.	"I Believe Hua Mulan"		3:56
17.	"The Charge"		5:21
18.	"Imperial City"		3:36
19.	"Chasing the Hawk"		2:24
20.	"Fight for the Kingdom"		5:43
21.	"Mulan & the Emperor"		0:57
22.	"Return to the Village"		1:32
23.	"The Fourth Virtue (Extended)"		5:41
24.	"Loyal Brave True"	Christina Aguilera	2:46
25.	"Reflection (2020)"	Christina Aguilera	3:38
26.	"Reflection (Mandarin)"	Yifei Liu	3:39

== Charts ==
Chart (2020)	Peak position
UK Soundtrack Albums (OCC)	13
US Billboard 200	109
US Soundtrack Albums (Billboard)	23

== See also ==
- Mulan (1998 soundtrack)
