= Rianto =

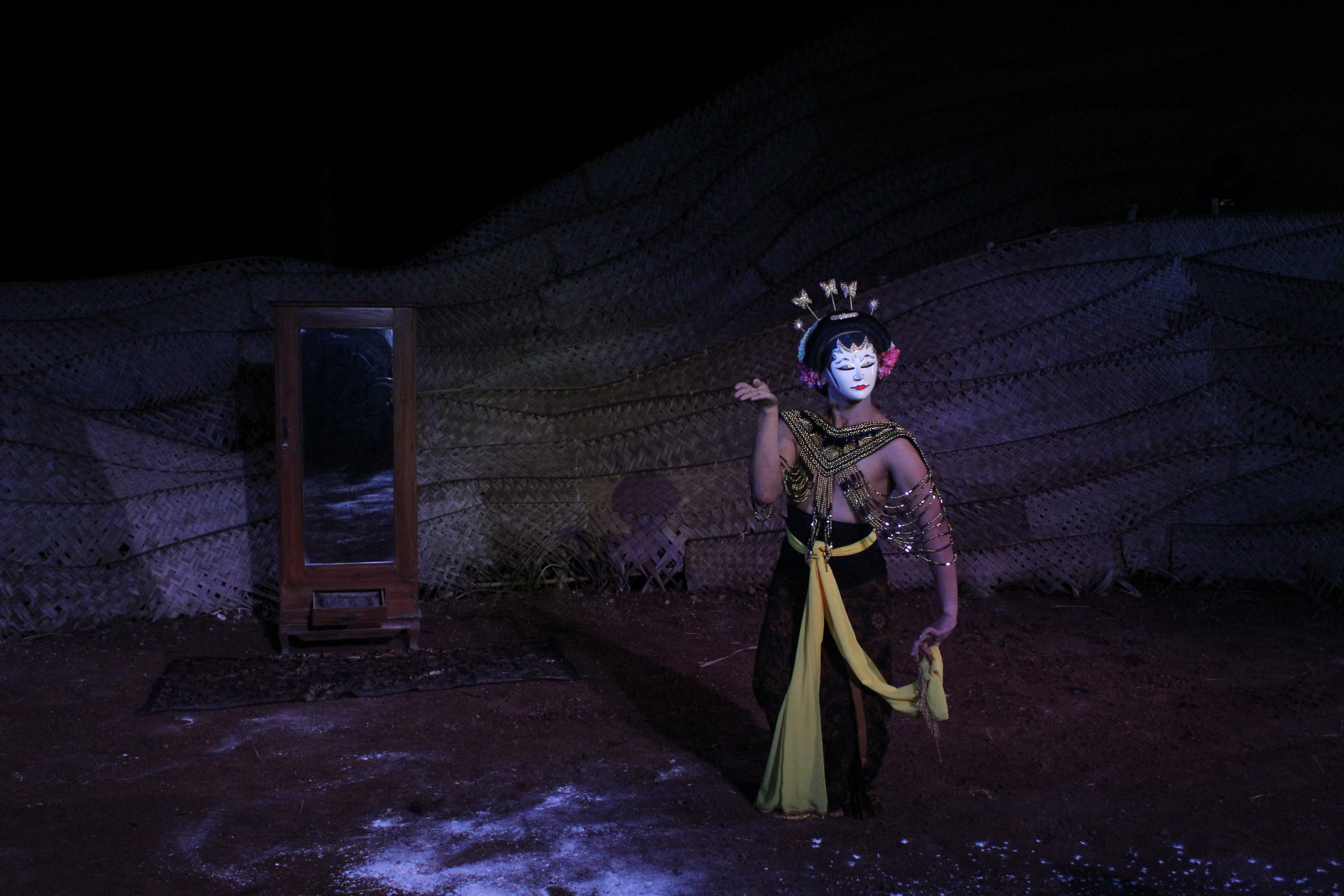
- Born: 1981 (age 44–45); Banyumas, Central Java, Indonesia
- Occupations: Dancer, choreographer

Rianto (born 1981) is an Indonesian-born, Japan-based dancer, choreographer and actor. A famed contemporary dancer, his life inspired Garin Nugroho's 2018 film Memories of My Body.

== Career ==
Rianto was born in Kaliori village, Banyumas, in the southwestern part of Central Java, Indonesia. He specialises in Lengger, a traditional cross-gender dance from Central Java.

In 2015, he performed SoftMachine, a solo work under the direction of Singapore artist Choy Ka Fai where he caught the attention of renowned British choreographer Akram Khan. His most recent solo work 'Medium' premiered in 2016.

After successfully touring the world with Akram Khan's company and Choy Ka Fai's SoftMachine, he will perform Khan's vengeful Until The Lions as well as Medium at the Esplanade's da:ns festival in October 2018.
