= Kaan Lativan =

Indonesian actor (born 1991)

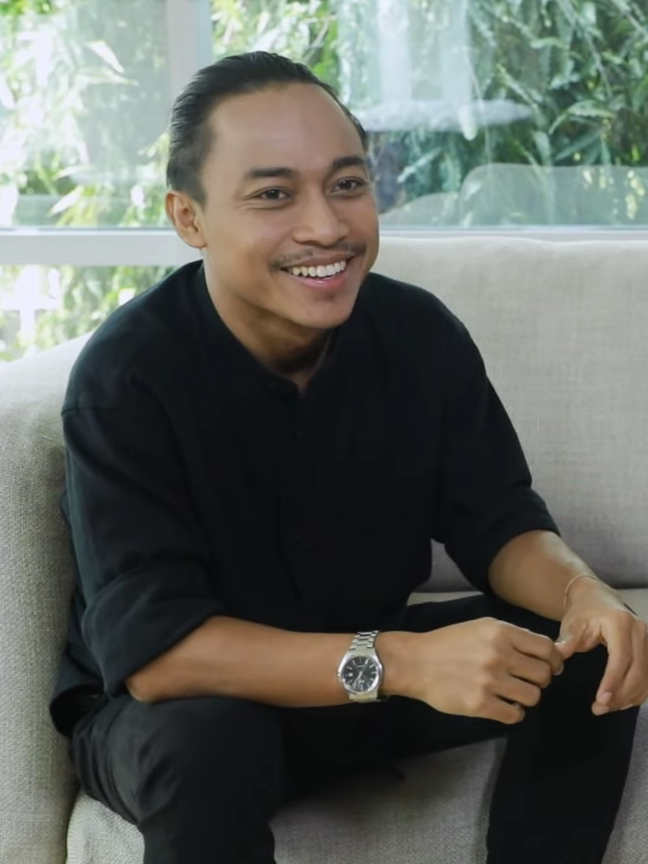
- Lativan in 2019
- Born: Nurdiyanto; 28 March 1991 (age 35); Jepara, Central Java, Indonesia
- Education: Institut Seni Indonesia Yogyakarta
- Occupation: Actor
- Years active: 2011—present

Nurdiyanto (born 28 March 1991), known professionally as Kaan Lativan and formerly known as Muhammad Khan, is an Indonesian actor who is known for starring as Juno in Memories of My Body (2018) in his acting debut, garnering him Citra Award for Best Actor.

== Early life ==
Nurdiyanto was born and raised in Semat Village, Jepara, Central Java, Indonesia, on 28 March 1991. He has idolized Indian actor Shah Rukh Khan since he was ten years old and he aspired to become an actor since then. When he was in middle school, he was called Shah Rukh Khan by his friends. Despite feeling uncomfortable, he introduced himself as Khan in high school. Upon entering the theater world, he decided to choose the stage name Muhammad Khan, which was based on the names of Prophet Muhammad and Shah Rukh Khan. He attended Institut Seni Indonesia Yogyakarta, majoring in theatre.

== Career ==
After graduating from Institut Seni Indonesia Yogyakarta, Lativan once participated in the casting of Garin Nugroho's Mata Tertutup in 2012, but he was not selected. He then was cast as the leading role of Juno in Nugroho's Memories of My Body in 2018. At the 2019 Indonesian Film Festival, he won the Citra Award for Best Actor. In his acceptance speech, he dedicated the award to Shah Rukh Khan. Shah Rukh Khan responded on his Twitter account and congratulated him for the award.

== Filmography ==
=== Film ===
Year	Title	Role	Notes
2018	Memories of My Body	Juno	
2019	Jakarta 2043	Man	Short
2020	Il Vespista		Short
2021	Yuni	Iman	
2021	Culas		Short
2022	Ivanna	Syaiful	
2022	Stealing Raden Saleh	Rama	
2022	Spirited	Kus	
2023	Today We'll Talk About That Day	Agus Widodo	
2023	Susuk	Prasetyo	
2023	Sweet Dreams	Reza	
2023	13 Bombs in Jakarta	Waluyo	
2024	Heartbreak Motel	Nurdiyanto	Credited as Nurdiyanto
2024	Crocodile Tears		
2024	Hutang Nyawa	Awang	
2025	On Your Lap	Asep	
