= Ify Alyssa =

Indonesian singer (born 1996)

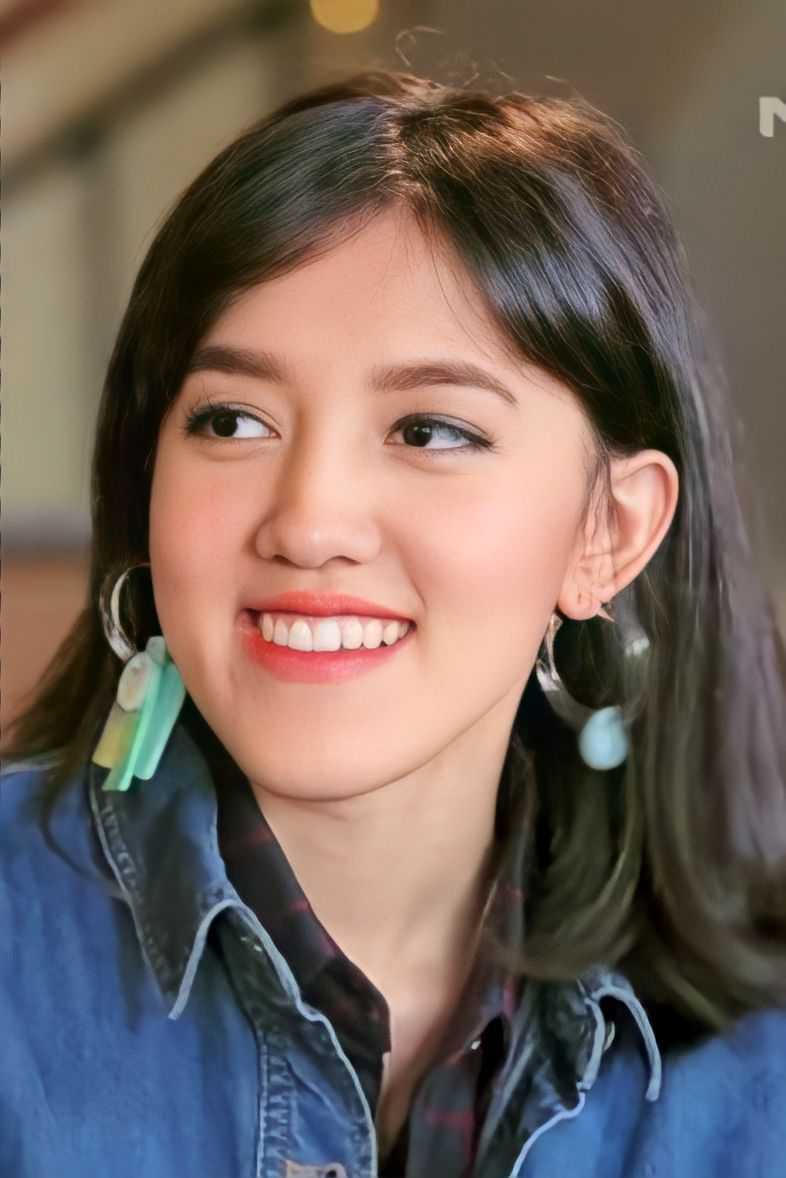
- Alyssa in 2017
- Born: Alyssa Saufika Umari; 6 December 1996 (age 29); Bandung, West Java, Indonesia
- Occupations: Singer; songwriter
- Years active: 2008–present
- Musical career
- Genres: Jazz pop; folk
- Instruments: Vocals; piano; guitar
- Formerly of: Blink

Alyssa Saufika Umari (born 6 December 1996), known as Ify Alyssa, is an Indonesian singer. She rose to prominence for placing twelfth in the first season of children's singing reality competition Idola Cilik, also as a member of girl group Blink. After the group disbanded in 2017, she has since released two studio albums, Pelita Lara (2020) and Menata (2025).

== Early life ==
Alyssa Saufika Umari was born in Bandung, West Java on 6 December 1996. She is the granddaughter of actress Farida Pasha (1952–2021). She graduated from Pelita Harapan University in 2020, majoring in music.

== Career ==
Alyssa started taking piano lessons when she was in kindergarten. Then, she took vocal lessons and participated in a choir during jazz saxophonist Sadao Watanabe's set at the 2007 Java Jazz Festival. In 2008, she participated in the first season of the children's singing reality competition Idola Cilik and placed twelfth.

In 2011, she became a member of the girl group Blink, with Febby Rastanty and Agatha Pricilla, also fellow Idola Cilik contestants, Ashilla Zahrantiara and Sivia Azizah. They starred in three soap operas on SCTV: Putih Abu-Abu, Diam-Diam Suka, and High School Love Story. The group disbanded in 2017.

In 2017, Alyssa made her debut as a solo artist by releasing a single titled "Gitar" with guitarist Gerald Situmorang. She chose to release her music independently in order to have creative freedom. In 2020, she released her debut studio album Pelita Lara. She held a virtual concert in support of her album, titled Pelita Lara Live Session, on 10 April 2021.

In 2022, she collaborated with Indonesian pop group HIVI!, guitarist Gerald Situmorang, and pianist Sri Hanuraga to release a collaborative album Bermain Rintik di Musim Hujan. She won her first Anugerah Musik Indonesia award for Best Contemporary Jazz Artist for "Memori" with HIVI!, Situmorang, and Hanuraga at the 2022 ceremony. In November 2022, she embarked on a concert tour Pelita Lara Tour in four cities around Java.

In 2025, she released her sophomore studio album Menata.

== Filmography ==
Film performances
Year	Title	Role	Notes
2015	Heart Beat	Aluna	

Television performances
Year	Title	Role	Network	Notes
2012–2013	Putih Abu-Abu	Ify	SCTV	
2013–2015	Diam-Diam Suka	Fio	SCTV	
2015	High School Love Story	Rere	SCTV	
2021	Bermain Rintik di Musim Hujan	Mentari	YouTube	

== Discography ==
=== Studio albums ===
Title	Details
Pelita Lara	Released: 16 October 2020; Label: Independent
Menata	Released: 17 January 2025; Label: Independent

=== Collaborative albums ===
Title	Details
Bermain Rintik di Musim Hujan (with HIVI!, Gerald Situmorang, and Sri Hanuraga)	Released: 16 August 2022; Label: Merakit Pelita Realita

=== Singles ===
As lead artist

Title	Year	Album
"Gitar" (featuring Gerald Situmorang)	2017	Pelita Lara
"Seirama"	2018	Pelita Lara
"Sisa Hari"	2019	Pelita Lara
"Dua Insan" (featuring Adhitia Sofyan)	2019	Pelita Lara
"What About Us?"	2020	Pelita Lara
"Rintik Hujan" (with HIVI!, Gerald Situmorang, and Sri Hanuraga)	2021	Bermain Rintik di Musim Hujan
"Memori" (with HIVI!, Gerald Situmorang, and Sri Hanuraga)	2022	Bermain Rintik di Musim Hujan
"Mengapa Baru Sekarang?" (with HIVI!, Gerald Situmorang, and Sri Hanuraga)	2022	Bermain Rintik di Musim Hujan
"Roda-Roda"	2023	Menata
"Tak Istimewa"	2023	Menata
"Semesta Menari"	2024	Menata

As featured artist

Title	Year	Album
"Hope" (Kasyfi Kalyasena, Odi Purba, and Elfa Zulham featuring Ify Alyssa)	2021	Non-album single
"Like Someone In Love" (Dua Empat, Hansen Arief, and Joshua Alexander featuring Ify Alyssa)	2023	Some of My Best Friends Are Jazz Cats!
