= Blink Indonesia =

Indonesian music group (2011–2017)

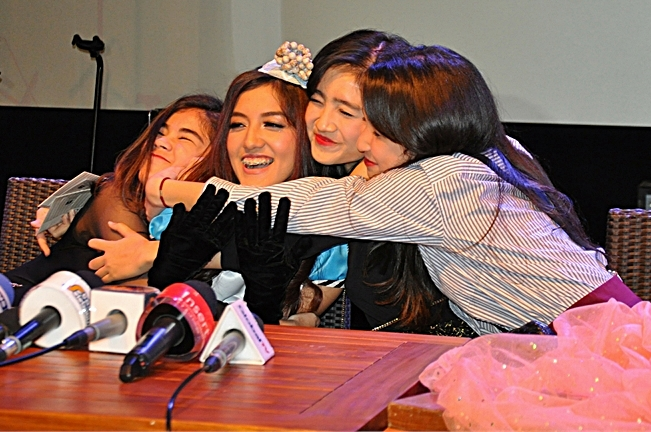
- From left to right: Sivia, Ify, Febby, Pricilla

Background information
- Also known as: Blink Indonesia
- Origin: Indonesia
- Genres: Pop, R&B, jazz, electropop, dance-pop
- Years active: 2011-2017 2026-
- Label: Music Factory Indonesia
- Members: Ify; Sivia; Pricilla; Febby; Shilla

Blink (or Blink Indonesia) were an Indonesian girl group formed in Jakarta on 23 July 2011. They later appeared in the musical television series called Putih Abu-Abu in 2012. They started their career by carrying Pop and Jazz stream and eventually mixed with electropop.

Blink consists of four members: Alyssa Saufika Umari (Ify), Sivia Azizah (Sivia), Agatha Pricilla (Pricilla), and Febby Rastanty (Febby). All of them play acoustic instruments, and sing.

== History ==
The girl group often perform cover versions of other songs to practice a cappella, including Firework by Katy Perry, and What Makes You Beautiful by One Direction.

=== 2011-2012: Debut and Putih Abu Abu ===
Their first television appearance was on RCTI on 14 August 2011, with their first single, titled "Sendiri Lagi" which was directly improvised by Sivia and Ify.

Then they were invited to perform at Inbox SCTV on 20 August 2011. In addition to singing songs, they performed an a cappella cover of the song Price Tag.

They released their second single, titled "Dag Dig Dug", on 19 November 2011 at Inbox SCTV. Through that single, they were asked to be the central characters in the musical television series Putih Abu-Abu, and their single became the theme song for that series, which aired on SCTV.

On the series Putih Abu-Abu, the band released their songs one by one, with at least three versions of each song: the acoustic (live), pop, and electropop.

They performed in the Putih Abu-Abu Music Concert (musical concert version of the television series) on SCTV, followed with their next concert, Putih Abu-Abu Music Concert, 2nd Chapter.

While appearing in the Putih Abu-Abu series, they also held concerts while maintaining their school studies, as all of them were high school students aged 15–16 years old.

== Discography ==
=== Singles ===
Year	Title	Notes
2011	Sendiri Lagi	Recycle from Bonus Band
2011	Dag Dig Dug/Putih Abu-Abu	OST Television series: Putih Abu-Abu
2012	About You	OST Television series: Putih Abu-Abu
2012	Andaikan	OST Television series: Putih Abu-Abu
2012	Takut	OST Television series: Putih Abu-Abu
2012	Sejuta Rasanya	OST Television series: Putih Abu-Abu
2012	Jatuh Cinta	OST Television series: Putih Abu-Abu
2012	Cinta Pertama	OST Television series: Putih Abu-Abu
2012	Best Friend	OST Television series: Putih Abu-Abu
2012	Blinkin'	OST Television series: Putih Abu-Abu
2012	Salamun Alaik	OST Television series: Putih Abu-Abu
2012	Oh My God (OMG)	OST Television series: Putih Abu-Abu
2012	Hellow Mellow	OST Television series: Putih Abu-Abu
2012	Ga Tahan Lagi	OST Television series: Putih Abu-Abu
2012	Gila	OST Television series: Putih Abu-Abu
2012	Pacar Pertama	OST Television series: Putih Abu-Abu
2012	Jatuh Cinta Lagi	OST Television series: Putih Abu-Abu
2013	Love You Kamu	OST Television series: Putih Abu-Abu 2
2013	That's My Boy	OST Television series: Putih Abu-Abu 2
2013	CLBK	OST Television series: Putih Abu-Abu 2
2013	Rindu	OST Television series: Putih Abu-Abu 2
2013	Setia	OST Television series: Putih Abu-Abu 2
2013	Blinkstar	Dedicated to Blinkstar
2013	Ini Cinta	OST Television series: Diam-Diam Suka
2013	Twitter Dunia	

=== Albums ===
- BLINK (2013)
- Heart Beat (2015)

=== Mini Albums and CDs ===
- SOPHIE & BLINK (2013)

== Concert Tours ==
=== Putih Abu Abu ===
- Putih Abu Abu Concert
- Putih Abu Abu Concert Chapter 2

=== Concert participation ===
- SMASH Special Concert: Ready to Blast
- SMASH Concert: Step Forward
- K20 Concert Special Melly Goeslaw
- Masterpiece of Koes Plus
- Konser Lagu Anak
- Purwacaraka Music Studio's 25th Anniversary Concert

== Videography ==
=== Music videos ===
- Sendiri Lagi (2011)
- Hellow Mellow (2013)
