= Reflection (song) =

1998 song from Disney's Mulan

Song by Lea Salonga

from the album Mulan: An Original Walt Disney Records Soundtrack
- Released: June 2, 1998
- Recorded: 1997
- Length: 2:27
- Label: Walt Disney
- Composer: Matthew Wilder
- Lyricist: David Zippel
- Producer: Matthew Wilder

"Reflection" is a song written and produced by Matthew Wilder and David Zippel for the soundtrack of Disney's 1998 animated film Mulan. In the film, the song is performed by Tony Award winner, Filipina singer and actress Lea Salonga as the film's titular character. "Reflection" has received highly positive reviews, with critics highlighting its emotional writing and Salonga's vocals. Despite not being released as a single, nor making any chart, the song would later be certified 2× Platinum by the Recording Industry Association of America (RIAA) for equivalent sales of 2,000,000 units in the United States, and was certified Silver by the British Phonographic Industry (BPI) for equivalent sales of 200,000 units in the United Kingdom. An accompanying music video for "Reflection" was included as a bonus to the Disney Gold Classic Collection DVD release of the film in February 2000.

A pop version of the song was recorded by American singer Christina Aguilera at the age of 17 for the Mulan soundtrack, and was featured in the end credits. Its structure differed from previous versions in that it added a bridge and an additional chorus prior to the coda. The song became Aguilera's solo debut single, found critical and commercial success, gained her credibility amongst established writers and producers, and was included on her eponymous debut album, released in 1999. The song peaked within the top 20 on the Billboard Adult Contemporary chart, and was also released alongside an accompanying music video, which was included on the DVD release of the film, alongside the original song's video. After its release, Aguilera has performed the track on multiple tours and televised performances. Aguilera also recorded a Spanish language version of the song which was featured on and titled her second studio album, Mi Reflejo (2000). In 2020, Aguilera re-recorded the song for the live-action adaptation of Mulan, released that same year.

== Use in Mulan ==
For the 1998 animated film Mulan, the song was recorded by Filipina singer and actress Lea Salonga as the film's titular character, Fa Mulan. "Reflection", which lasts for two minutes and twenty-seven seconds was written and produced by Matthew Wilder and David Zippel, and is in the key of A major (though beginning in the submediant key of F-sharp major). Salonga's vocal range spans from the low-note of G♯_{3} to the high-note of D_{5} in a moderately slow tempo of 119 beats per minute. The recording that was actually used within the film was substantially shorter than a version they initially recorded with Salonga, which had an additional verse and chorus before the coda.

The song is performed after Mulan returns home following a humiliating and failed attempt to impress her matchmaker. The lyrical content expresses the way Mulan feels about wanting to show the world who she really is instead of pretending to be who she is not, but is afraid to disappoint her family by doing so. This scene takes place at Mulan's home in its surrounding gardens and ends in her family temple, where she removes her makeup to reveal her true appearance.

In 2015, Salonga revealed that she was asked to re-record the song back in 1996, in its shortened form, as the producers saw that the first version was not moving the story along.

=== Certifications ===
Certifications for "Reflection"
Region	Certification	Certified units/sales
United Kingdom (BPI)	Silver	200,000^{‡}
United States (RIAA)	2× Platinum	2,000,000^{‡}
^{‡} Sales+streaming figures based on certification alone.

== Christina Aguilera versions ==
=== 1998 version ===
"Reflection"

Single by Christina Aguilera

from the album Mulan: An Original Walt Disney Records Soundtrack
- B-side: "Honor to Us All"
- Released: June 15, 1998
- Studio: The Record Plant (Los Angeles, CA)
- Genre: Pop; R&B
- Length: 3:33
- Label: Walt Disney
- Composer: Matthew Wilder
- Lyricist: David Zippel
- Producer: Matthew Wilder

Christina Aguilera singles chronology
"All I Wanna Do" (1997)	"Reflection" (1998)	"Genie in a Bottle" (1999)

Audio video
- "Reflection" (Pop version) on YouTube

"Reflection"
A sample of "Reflection", featuring Aguilera singing the last chorus over a pop and R&B background.

==== Background and recording ====
In December 1997, Disney was looking for a vocalist to sing the song "Reflection" for their movie-in-the-works, Mulan. The RCA label suggested American singer Christina Aguilera for the track. Within forty-eight hours of the initial call from the company, Disney officials congratulated Aguilera and told her she "got the deal". It took about seven days to record the song. Remembering how the accompaniment for the ballad was recorded, Aguilera told Pittsburgh Post-Gazette, "It's enough to bring tears to your eyes, hearing a 90-piece orchestra playing your song. It was amazing." It was conducted by the Academy Award-winning composer Jerry Goldsmith. "Reflection" was Aguilera's second official studio track ever recorded, after the single "All I Wanna Do", a duet with Japanese singer-songwriter Keizo Nakanishi.

After she was asked to hit E_{5}, the highest note required by Disney, she thought that the song could be the gateway into an album deal. Aguilera spent hours recording a cover of Whitney Houston's "Run to You", which included the note she was asked to hit. After successfully hitting the note, which she called "the note that changed my life", she was given the opportunity to record the song and subsequently signed a record deal with RCA Records.

Serving as her debut solo single, Aguilera's version of "Reflection" was released to adult contemporary radio on June 15, 1998. The song was released as a CD single in Japan on September 18, 1998. Due to the success around the recording of "Reflection", RCA wished for Aguilera to record and release an album by September 1998 to maintain the "hype" surrounding her at that time. The label laid the foundation for the album immediately and started presenting Aguilera with tracks for her debut album, which was later pushed to a January 1999 release. Her self-titled debut album was eventually released on August 24, 1999, and "Reflection" was included on the album's track list. It was later included on the compilation Disneymania (2002) and in remixed form on Disneymania 4 (2004).

In a 2024 interview for Spotify, Aguilera opined that "Reflection" has "stood the test of time", and added: "[...] People love that song so much because it's about not being seen and that's been a part of my career."

==== Reception ====
Aguilera's rendition of "Reflection" received acclaim. Toronto Sun editor Jane Stevenson called it an "adult-contemporary hit" which started the singer's career. Beth Johnson of Entertainment Weekly noted Aguilera has a "who-am-I musings" persona in the song, while Stephen Thomas Erlewine of AllMusic commented that "Matthew Wilder and David Zippel's full-fledged songs [on Mulan] are flat and unmemorable." By contrast, in retrospect, Billboard's Chris Malone complimented the song as a "classic ballad". Billboard later placed "Reflection" at number twenty-three on its list of the 100 Greatest Disneyverse Songs of All Time, commenting: "Largely thanks to Christina Aguilera’s breakthrough rendition of the hit, 'Reflection' has become an anthem for young people – especially women – who are working towards being unapologetically themselves." Attitude ranked "Reflection" at number twelve on its list of Aguilera's seventeen best songs, calling it "finely crafted", and AXS placed it at number eight on a similar, top ten list. "Reflection" was nominated for Outstanding Performance of a Song for Feature Film at the 1999 ALMA Awards.

"Reflection" charted at number 86 on the South Korea International chart, and peaked at number 19 on the Adult Contemporary chart in the United States. After the success of the track, Aguilera's record label RCA decided to fund her debut album (costing over one million dollars), and eventually funded more than they had predicted initially.

==== Live performances ====
Aguilera performed the song on television four times, first on the CBS This Morning, and then on the Donny & Marie show; neither of these performances were directed at her demographic of teen viewers. Whilst watching the show on This Morning, Aguilera gained the attention of songwriter Diane Warren, who was astonished by such a young performer being as "polished" as she was. Warren later stated that she had seen the potential in Aguilera. The singer also performed "Reflection" on MuchMusic's Intimate and Interactive on May 17, 2000. An ABC special in 2000, featuring a performance of the song, was recorded and released in a DVD titled My Reflection. The song was later included in the setlist for Aguilera's Vegas residency Christina Aguilera: The Xperience. In 2024, Aguilera performed the song at the end of her 25th anniversary Spotify special and was released as part of an extended play titled The 25th Anniversary of Christina Aguilera (Spotify Anniversaries Live).

==== International versions ====
- Aguilera's version of the song was re-dubbed into a number of languages to be featured in their respective foreign soundtracks released in 1998. In 2000, Aguilera herself recorded her Spanish-language version of "Reflection", titled “Mi Reflejo" (“My Reflection”) which was adapted by Rudy Pérez for her second studio album of the same name. As both Spanish soundtracks had been released two years earlier, each featuring their end-credits version, Aguilera's version was not featured in either of them.
- For the Hispanic-American market, the song was titled "Reflejo" and performed in Spanish-language by Mexican singer Lucero. In her Korean version of the song, titled "내안의 나를" ("Naeane naleul"), Korean American singer Lena Park went up to an A_{5}. Hong Kong-American singer and actress Coco Lee performed a Mandarin version of the song titled "自己" ("Zìjǐ"), after she was called to voice the character of Mulan in the Mandarin dubbing distributed in Taiwan.

==== Legacy ====
In 2025, Cardi B was a guest on Call Her Daddy and revealed that "Reflection" was "as inspiration [for her] to find her purpose in life".

==== Track listing ====
- Australian CD single
1. "Reflection" (performed by Christina Aguilera) – 3:34
2. "Honor To Us All" (performed by Beth Fowler, Lea Salonga, Marnie Nixon) – 3:03
- Japan CD Mini single
1. "Reflection" (performed by Christina Aguilera) – 3:34
2. "Reflection" (performed by Lea Salonga) – 2:27
- Taiwan CD Mini single Promo
1. "Reflection" (performed by Christina Aguilera) – 3:34
2. "True To Your Heart" (performed by 98 Degrees & Stevie Wonder) – 4:17

==== Charts ====
Weekly chart performance for "Reflection"
Chart (1998–2014)	Peak position
South Korea International (Gaon)	86
US Adult Contemporary (Billboard)	19

==== Release history ====
Release history and formats for "Reflection"
Region	Date	Format(s)	Label(s)	Ref.
United States	June 15, 1998	Adult contemporary	RCA; Walt Disney	
Japan	September 18, 1998	CD	Pony Canyon	

=== 2020 version ===
"Reflection (2020)"

Single by Christina Aguilera

from the album Mulan
- Released: August 28, 2020
- Length: 3:38
- Label: Walt Disney
- Composer: Matthew Wilder
- Lyricist: David Zippel
- Producer: Harry Gregson-Williams

Christina Aguilera singles chronology
"Loyal Brave True" (2020)	"Reflection (2020)" (2020)	"Pa Mis Muchachas" (2021)

Music video
- "Reflection" (2020) on YouTube

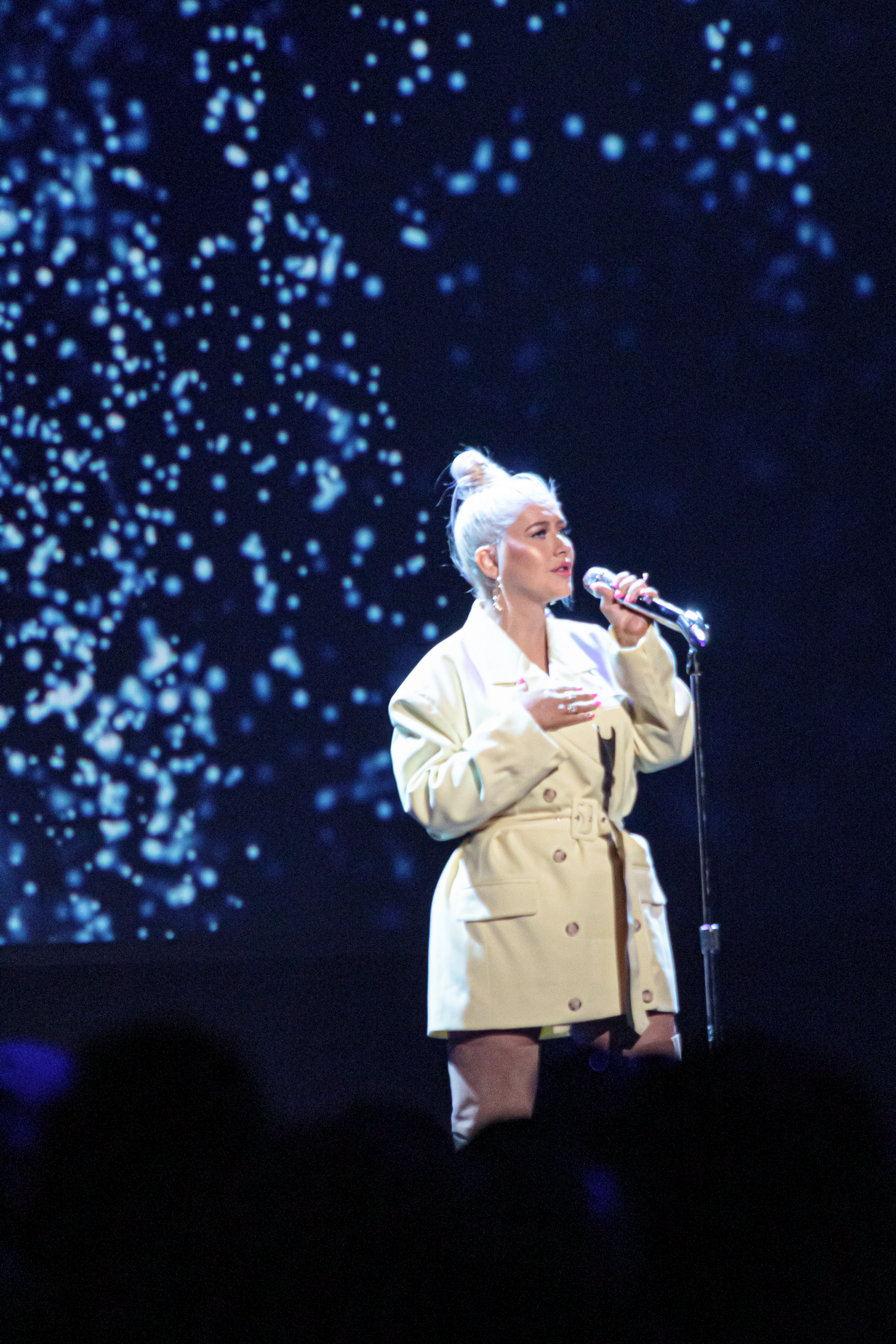
Aguilera performing "Reflection" during the D23 Expo in 2019, where she was honored as a Disney Legend

Although the live action remake was announced not to be a musical, on February 27, 2020, Aguilera announced that she had recorded a new version of the song for the upcoming movie, which was going to be featured in the movie soundtrack. Film composer Harry Gregson-Williams provided the orchestra for Aguilera's re-recorded version, and film director Niki Caro directed the music video.

==== Reception ====
In December 2020, PopSugar UK's Kelsie Gibson named the release of "Reflection" as one of the top 15 nostalgic moments of the year. Commercially, the single charted at number 42 on the Scottish Singles Chart, number 35 on the United Kingdom Singles Downloads Chart, number 21 in Singapore, and number 20 on the Billboard Digital Song Sales chart in the United States. It was also certified Gold by the Recording Industry Association of America (RIAA) for equivalent sales of 500,000 units in the United States, and was nominated for the Best Adapted Song at the 2021 Online Film & Television Association Awards.

==== International versions ====
Later that year, Coco Lee also announced that she was going to re-record the Mandarin end-credits version of the song, as she had already done in 1998. On March 8, 2020, Coco's Mandarin version was also covered by actress Liu Yifei for the soundtrack of the live-action, while a brand-new Japanese and Korean versions were recorded by singers Minami Kizuki and Lee Su-hyun respectively. On September 4, 2020, a Hindi, Tamil, and Telugu versions were released on the Indian Vevo channel, with Indian singer Nithayashree Venkataramanan performing the song both in Tamil and Telugu, even though no such versions of the animated movie were ever released. On November 20, 2020, another English version of the song was recorded by Indonesian singers Yura Yunita, Sivia Azizah, Agatha Pricilla, and Nadin Amizah, with the music video released on the DisneyMusicAsiaVEVO channel. The song was released to accompany the Indonesian-dubbed version of the movie on Disney+ Hotstar.

"Reflection" (2020 end credits version) worldwide
Language	Performer	Title	Translation
English	Christina Aguilera	"Reflection"	
Hindi	Sunayana Sarkar	"परछाई" ("Parchhaayi")	"Reflection"
Japanese	城南海 (Minami Kizuki)	"リフレクション" ("Rifurekushon")	
Korean	이수현 (Lee Su-hyun)	"숨겨진 내 모습" ("Sumgyeojin nae moseub")	"The hidden reflection of me"
Mandarin Chinese	李玟 (Coco Lee)	"自己" ("Zìjǐ")	"Myself"
Mandarin Chinese	刘亦菲 (Liu Yifei)	"自己" ("Zìjǐ")	"Myself"
Tamil	Nithayashree Venkataramanan	"என் பிம்பம்" ("Yen bhimbham")	"My reflection"
Telugu	Nithayashree Venkataramanan	"నాలో నేనే" ("Nālō nēnē")	"Self within myself"

==== Charts ====
Chart performance for "Reflection" (2020 version)
Chart (2020)	Peak position
Scotland (OCC)	42
Singapore (RIAS)	21
UK Download Chart (OCC)	35
US Digital Song Sales (Billboard)	20
Wales (OCC)	100

==== Certifications ====
Certifications for "Reflection" (2020 version)
Region	Certification	Certified units/sales
United States (RIAA)	Gold	500,000^{‡}
^{‡} Sales+streaming figures based on certification alone.

== Other versions ==
The group Mannheim Steamroller covered the song on their 1999 album, Mannheim Steamroller Meets the Mouse. Michael Crawford covered this song in The Disney Album. His rendition replaces the word "girl" with "man". Singer and American Idol winner Jordin Sparks performed the song on the Dedication Week of the sixth season of the show, with the performance she moved forward to the next round. Jackie Evancho also covered the song on her fourth studio album, Songs from the Silver Screen. In La Voz... Argentina (the Argentinian version of The Voice), the Spanish version of the song was covered by Sofia Rangone. During the Chinese competition show Singer 2018, British Singer Jessie J performed a rearranged version of the song, during episode 11, gaining her fifth first place. On May 7, 2023, Nicole Scherzinger performed the song at the Coronation Concert, held in celebration of the coronation of King Charles III and Queen Camilla the day before, accompanied by Chinese pianist Lang Lang.
