= Nadin Amizah =

Indonesian singer and songwriter (born 2000)

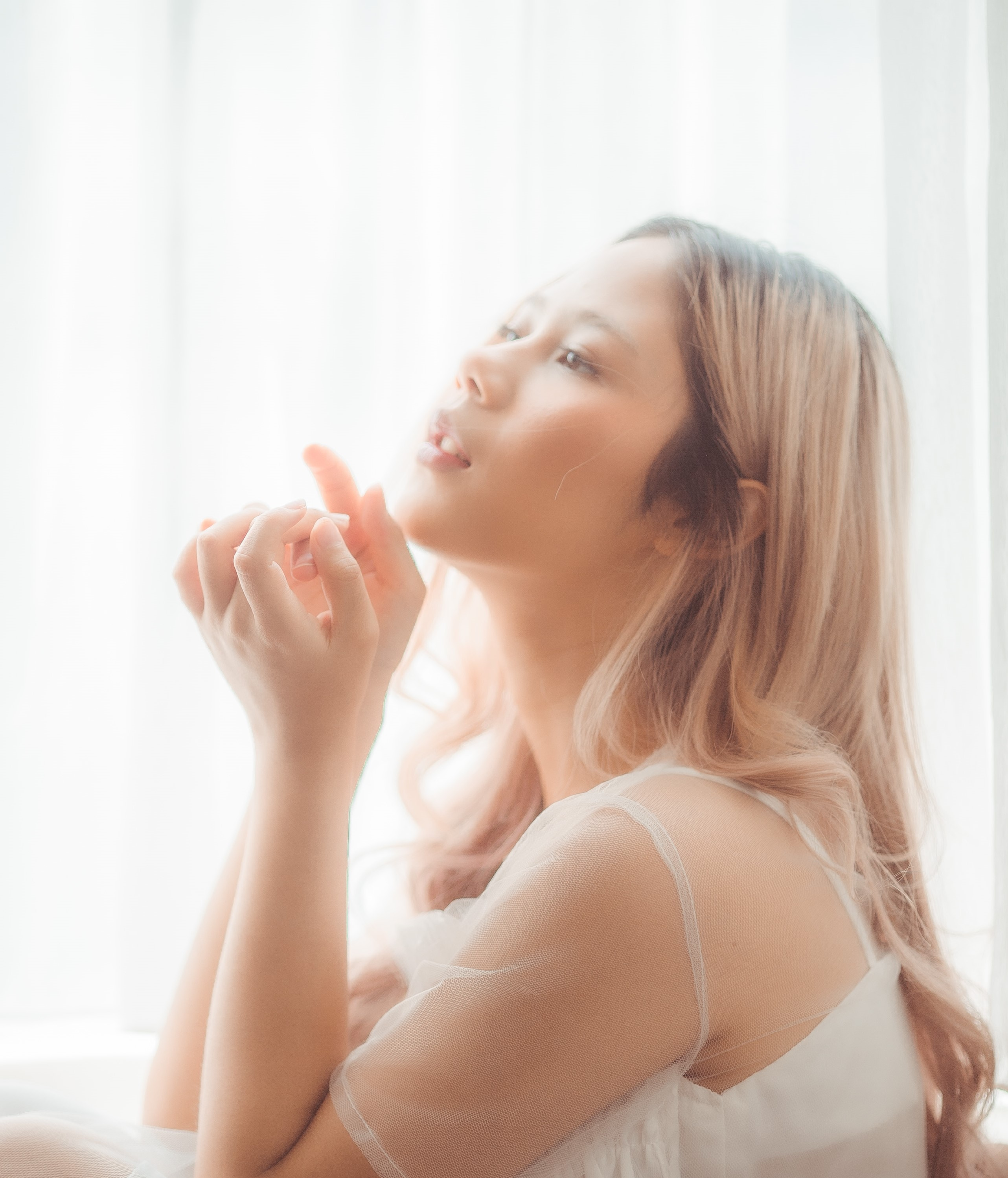
- Born: Nadin Amizah Harahap; 28 May 2000 (age 26); Bandung, West Java, Indonesia
- Other name: Nadin
- Occupations: Singer; songwriter
- Musical career
- Genre: Indie folk
- Instrument: Vocals
- Years active: 2016–present

Nadin Amizah (born 28 May 2000) is an Indonesian singer and songwriter. She had her breakthrough after collaborating with Dipha Barus on a single, "All Good" in 2017. A year later, she released her debut solo single "Rumpang" which garnered her the award of Best New Artist at the 2019 Anugerah Musik Indonesia.

Amizah has received four Anugerah Musik Indonesia awards from fourteen nominations and an Indonesian Film Festival nomination.

== Early life ==
Nadin Amizah was born in Bandung, West Java, on 28 May 2000 to Raja and Intan Gurnita Widiatie. Her parents divorced when she and her sister, Kayla, were still attending school. She spent her childhood living with her grandmother in Bandung, while her mother worked in Jakarta and visited them on weekends.

After graduating from high school, she majored in communication studies at the London School of Public Relations in Jakarta and graduated in 2022. She started gaining public recognition through social media covers and participation in talent shows. Over the years, Nadin has become a well-respected figure in Indonesian music, known for her unique voice and heartfelt performances, and she has received multiple awards and nominations throughout her career.

== Career ==
=== 2016–2019: Early beginnings and breakthrough ===
Amizah started her musical career by uploading videos of her covering various songs on social media. She was then contacted by the television network Trans TV to join the competition Social Media Sensation in 2016, where she finished third. In 2016, producer Dipha Barus asked her to collaborate with his social media followers recommended Amizah as his next collaborator. Their single "All Good" was released on March 8, 2017. The song garnered three nominations and won the award for Best Dance/Electronic Production Work at the 2017 Anugerah Musik Indonesia.

Following the success of "All Good", Amizah disclosed her intention to release folk music, in contrast of dance and electronic of the single. On 14 September 2018, she released her debut single, "Rumpang" which she wrote when she was sixteen. She previously released a live performance of the song on her YouTube channel three months prior. The song won Best Folk/Country/Ballad Production Work and garnered her the award of Best New Artist at the 2019 Anugerah Musik Indonesia. In 2019, she released singles "Sorai", "—star.", and "Seperti Tulang". On 29 May 2019, she also released a single with pop singer Sal Priadi titled "Amin Paling Serius", which peaked on number six on Billboard Indonesia Top 100.

=== 2020–2022: Selamat Ulang Tahun and Kalah Bertaruh ===
Amizah released her debut studio album, Selamat Ulang Tahun, on her twentieth birthday, 28 May 2020. The album was nominated for Album of the Year and Best Pop Album at the 2020 Anugerah Musik Indonesia. On 20 November 2020, Amizah was selected by Disney Indonesia along with Yura Yunita, Agatha Pricilla, and Sivia Azizah to release a cover of "Reflection" in support of the 2020 film Mulan. Amidst the COVID-19 pandemic, Amizah held a virtual concert in support of her album, titled Selamat Ulang Tahun: Sebuah Pertunjukan, on 27 November 2020 and it was attended virtually by more than 7,000 people. On 3 December 2020, Amizah released a single with Kunto Aji titled "Selaras" in a partnership with IM3 Ooredoo.

On 24 March 2021, Amizah released a single titled "seperti takdir kita yang tulis". A year after Selamat Ulang Tahun, Amizah released her first extended play, kalah bertaruh on 26 May 2021, produced by ambient folk musician Reruntuh. On 22 December 2022, Amizah held her first concert in support for her debut studio album at the Gelora Bung Karno Basketball Hall, Jakarta. On 21 January 2023, Amizah held the Selamat Ulang Tahun concert at the Zepp, Kuala Lumpur, Malaysia.

=== 2023–present: Untuk Dunia, Cinta, dan Kotornya ===
On 23 June 2023, Amizah released the lead single of then-upcoming sophomore studio album, titled "Rayuan Perempuan Gila". The single peaked on number four on Billboard Indonesia Songs. On 4 August 2023, she released the second single titled "Semua Aku Dirayakan". On 3 September 2023, Amizah announced that her second studio album, to be released a month later and released the third single "Tawa". Her sophomore studio album, Untuk Dunia, Cinta dan Kotornya, was released on 13 October 2023. The album showcase was held on 4 November 2023 at the Bengkel Space, Sudirman Central Business District, Jakarta to a sold-out 2,000 crowd. "Sorai" was nominated for Best Theme Song at the 2023 Indonesian Film Festival, after being selected as the soundtrack of 2023 film When It Stops Here.

In November 2023, Amizah was selected to sing the theme song of Netflix television series, Cigarette Girl. She performed a cover of 1978 song "Kala Sang Surya Tenggelam", originally performed by Chrisye. Director Kamila Andini chose Amizah to perform the theme song as she felt that Amizah's voice resonated with the voices of the women depicted in the story.

== Discography ==
=== Studio Albums ===
- Selamat Ulang Tahun (2020)
- Untuk Dunia, Cinta, dan Kotornya (2023)
- Laika, Yang Ditinggalkan (2026)

=== Extended Plays ===
- kalah bertaruh (2021)

=== Live Albums ===
- Dalam Sunyi (2026)

=== Singles ===
As lead artist

Title	Year	Album
"Rumpang"	2018	Non-album singles
"Sorai"	2019	Non-album singles
"—star."	2019	Non-album singles
"Amin Paling Serius" (with Sal Priadi)	2019	Berhati
"Seperti Tulang"	2019	Non-album single
"Bertaut"	2020	Selamat Ulang Tahun
"Reflection" (with Yura Yunita, SIVIA, and Agatha Pricilla)	2020	Non-album single
"Selaras" (with Kunto Aji)	2020	Non-album single
"Seperti Takdir Kita Yang Tulis"	2021	Kalah Bertaruh
"Rayuan Perempuan Gila"	2023	Untuk Dunia, Cinta, dan Kotornya
"Semua Aku Dirayakan"	2023	Untuk Dunia, Cinta, dan Kotornya
"Tawa"	2023	Untuk Dunia, Cinta, dan Kotornya
"Berpayung Tuhan"	2023	Untuk Dunia, Cinta, dan Kotornya
"Kala Sang Surya Tenggelam"	2023	Non-album single

As featured artist

Title	Year	Album
"All Good" (Dipha Barus featuring Nadin)	2017	Non-album singles
"Beauty and the Beast" (Adera featuring Nadin Amizah)	2017	Non-album singles
"Teralih (Aero's Tape)" (Matter Halo featuring Nadin Amizah)	2017	Bila Bulan Tak Hadir

=== Guest appearances ===
Title	Year	Other artist(s)	Album
"Untukmu"	2021	Iwan Fals	Pun Aku
"Forgot Password"	2023	Hindia	Lagipula Hidup Akan Berakhir

== Awards and nominations ==
=== Anugerah Musik Indonesia ===
Year	Category	Nominated work	Result	Ref.
2017	Production Work of the Year	"All Good" (Dipha Barus featuring Nadin)	Nominated	
2017	Best Collaboration Production Work	"All Good" (Dipha Barus featuring Nadin)	Nominated	
2017	Best Dance/Electronic Production Work	"All Good" (Dipha Barus featuring Nadin)	Won	
2018	Best Folk/Country/Ballad Production Work	"Teralih" (Matter Halo featuring Nadin)	Nominated	
2018	Best Rearrangement Production Work	"All Good" (Acoustic version) (Dipha Barus featuring Nadin)	Nominated	
2019	Best New Artist	"Rumpang"	Won	
2019	Best Folk/Country/Ballad Production Work	"Rumpang"	Won	
2019	Best Collaboration Production Work	"Amin Paling Serius" (with Sal Priadi)	Nominated	
2020	Album of the Year	Selamat Ulang Tahun	Nominated	
2020	Best Pop Album	Selamat Ulang Tahun	Nominated	
2020	Best Folk/Country/Ballad Production Work	"Bertaut"	Won	
2021	Best Pop Album	Kalah Bertaruh	Nominated	
2021	Best Alternative Solo Artist	"Sebuah Tarian yang Tak Kunjung Selesai"	Nominated	
2023	Best Female Pop Solo Artist	"Rayuan Perempuan Gila"	Nominated	

Awards and achievements
Preceded by Marion Jola	22nd Annual Anugerah Musik Indonesia for Best Newcomer; 2019	Succeeded by Tiara Andini

=== Indonesian Film Festival ===
Year	Category	Nominated work	Result	Ref.
2023	Best Theme Song	"Sorai" (from When It Stops Here)	Nominated	
