= Randy Pangalila =

Indonesian actor (born 1990)

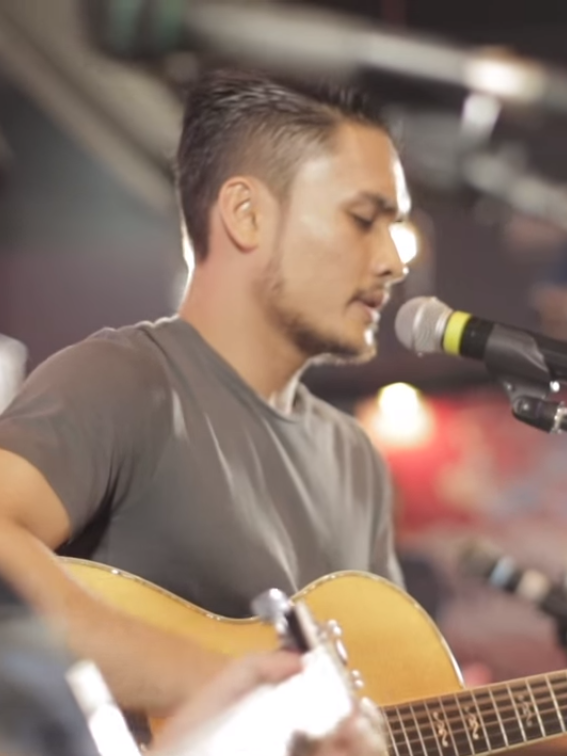
- Born: Randy Dionisius Pangalila; October 19, 1990 (age 35); Surabaya, East Java, Indonesia
- Occupations: Actor; singer
- Years active: 2006—present
- Spouse: Chelsey Frank (m. 2019)
- Children: 2
- Awards: see list
- Musical career
- Instrument: Vocal

Randy Dionisius Pangalila (born 19 October 1990) is an Indonesian actor and singer. He is known for his role as Tristan in the Indonesian soap opera Cinta Fitri.

Randy is the second child of E. H. A Pangalila and Lisa Pangalila. He is of Minahasan, Dutch, and Javanese descent.

Randy married Canadian woman Chelsey Frank on 19 January 2019. Randy and Chelsey welcomed their first child, a daughter, on 24 March 2021.

== Filmography ==
=== Film ===
Peran akting
Tahun	Judul	Peran	Catatan
2008	Oh Baby	Zarro	
2009	Kutukan Suster Ngesot	Derry	
2011	Bukan Pocong Biasa	Sam	
2014	Nyi Roro Kidul Project	Niko	
2016	Randy Mira	Randy	Short Films
2019	Kucumbu Tubuh Indahku	Petinju	
2019	Malam Jumat the Movie	Ryan	
2019	Si Manis Jembatan Ancol	Yudha	
2021	Serigala Langit	lieutenant Yogi Hartanto	
2021	2210	Ben	Short Films
2021	Perjalanan Pertama	Muchtar	
2022	Rumah Kaliurang	Brama	
2022	Qodrat	Zafar	
2022	Sri Asih	Mateo Adinegara	

=== Television ===
- Alisha (soap opera) (2007)
- Gue Banget
- Dongeng (2007)
- Cinta Fitri Season 1, Season 3, and Season Ramadhan (2007–2009)
- Cinta Kirana (2008)
- Chelsea (2008)
- Karissa (2008)
- I Love You (2009)
- Sumpah I Luv U (2009)
- Hafizah (2009–2010)
- Putih Merah (2010)
- Cinta Melody (2010)
- Cinta Piano
- Nada Cinta (2011)
- Kian 1,2,3
- Biar Mimpi Sampai Ke Bintang – With Malaysian actress (Elfira Loy) (2011)
- Aishiteru (2011)
- Si Miskin & Si Kaya
- Dalam Hati Ada Taman – With Malaysian actress (Elfira Loy) (2012)
- Raja Dan Aku (2012)
- Benci vs Cinta – With Malaysian actress (Nora Danish)
- Urusan Hati Cik Drama Queen (2017)

== Discography ==
- Lewat Semesta
- Tanpamu Ku Tak Bisa
- Everything I Need
- Selalu Milikmu – With Malaysian Actress (Marsha Milan Londoh)
