= Minami Kizuki =

- Born: Minami Kizuki 城 南海; 26 December 1989 (age 36); Amami Ōshima, Kagoshima Prefecture, Japan
- Genres: Pop, Shima-uta, Folk
- Occupation: Singer
- Instruments: Vocals, piano, sanshin, Xiqin
- Years active: 2009–present
- Label: Pony Canyon
- Website: www.kizukiminami.com (in Japanese)

Minami Kizuki (城 南海, Kizuki Minami), born on 26 December 1989, is a Japanese pop and Shima-uta folk singer. She was born in Amami Ōshima, Kagoshima, Japan. In 2006, Kizuki was recruited by Pony Canyon while performing on Kagoshima City's streets. Her debut single, "Ai Tsumugi" was released on 7 January 2009. She also writes lyrics and compositions. Her latest lyrics (in Japanese) is "Reflection" . It is the theme song of Disney's live-action movie "Mulan" (Japan version) which was released in 2020.

She uses guin, a type of kobushi peculiar to traditional folk songs of Amami Ōshima. Guin used at key points in the song captivates the ears of listeners. Recognized as a skilled J-Pop singer, some people are eager to listen to her singing songs of various genres. Some say that her singing voice is like a natural god.

She hopes to play a role of conveying the beauty of Japanese language to the world through music. Also, she would like to spread the charm of Amami to the world through songs. She is appointed as a tourism ambassador for some districts in Amami. She is expected to promote Amami by several local governments in Amami. She has participated in the "Uta-shima" project of Amami since May 2018. The project was organized in 2018 to support Amami to be registered as a World Heritage Site.

With her 10th anniversary, she has made it a challenge to try various new attempts to further explore and establish her own music. She organized a live tour of English popular music only in July 2019.

== Early life ==
Minami Kizuki was born in Amami Ōshima, Kagoshima, Japan. She once lived in the neighbouring island of Tokunoshima, part of the Amami Islands at junior high school age, at the age of 14 she moved to the city of Kagoshima on the mainland. Having learned the piano from the age of 2, it was not until after she moved to Kagoshima that her brother influenced her to study Shima-uta, the traditional folk music of her home islands. In 2006, Kizuki was recruited by Pony Canyon while performing on a park of Kagoshima City. She graduated from Syoyo high school in Kagoshima Prefecture, at which she majored in piano and minored in song. She graduated from a university, while continuing a singer. She wrote a graduation thesis on the similarities between music of Ireland and Amami Islands.

== Career ==
=== Debut and beginnings ===
She made a debut with a song of "Aitsumugi", on 7 January 2009. English and Chinese lyrics version of "Aitsumugi" were produced as well as Japanese lyrics version. They are available at iTunes store.

On 19 August 2009, her first album "Kana-Itoshikihitoyo(to sweet persons)" was released.The music video of its lead song "Taiyo to Kakurenbo (Hide-and-seek with the sun)" was taken on the solar eclipse day (22 July 2009) in Amami Ōshima. For the next several years, she released several singles and performed numerous times on radio and television throughout Japan. She performed in New York City twice. In June 2010, she performed at "Japan Day @ Central Park", a Japanese cultural expo. She performed in China three times.

=== Activities ===
She has released 4 original albums,12 single CDs,3 cover albums and the 10th anniversary best album so far.

Her song was often used as a closing theme song of a TV drama. One of the examples is "Sayonara Yori Mo Tsutaekattakkoto’”

The title of the most recent single CD is "Segodon Kiko:vol.Amami Oshima &Okinoerabujima” This CD is a collection of songs used in NHK’s Taiga Drama (in 2018)"Segodon".

She covers various songs besides original songs. She has released 3 cover albums so far. She has also participated in several albums made by other artists.

She sometimes writes lyrics and compositions. One of them, "Inoriuta-Toutoganashi" was used as the closing theme for NHK's overseas music program from December 2014 to March 2015. People in 30 countries shared their ideas and feelings about peace. Their messages inspired Minami Kizuki to write this song in her native Amami dialect (Amami Ōshima language).

Her first writing of lyrics(in Japanese) was an Irish folk song called "Londonderry Air (Danny Boy)", which was included in her first album "Kana-Itoshikihitoyo(to sweet persons)”

Her latest lyrics (in Japanese) is "Reflection" . It is the theme song of Disney's live-action movie "Mulan" (Japan version) which was released in 2020.

She conducts a live tour called "Uta-Ashibi(Uta means songs. Asibi means plays.) as her main activity about twice a year. She also sings at closed events of companies and organizations and at citizen associations of Amami.

She has conducted a tour of Amami with her fan club members once a year since 2016.

She sometimes sings outside Japan. In February 2018, She was dispatched to the Philippines by the Japan Foundation’s Japanese partnership project.

In May 2019, the best original & cover album was released to commemorate her 10th anniversary.

=== Musical ===
Kizuki played Shiro mokuren or white magnolia, which protect the raccoon dog forest on musical Tanuki Goten（狸御殿, lit. "Raccoon Dog Palace"） in Shimbashi Embujo, Tokyo, during August 2016. It is directed by Amon Miyamoto and starring Onoe Matsuya and Miori Takimoto. The musical was aired on 2 January 2017 on NHK educational channel.

=== Television fame ===
She also appears on television and on radio and sings.

On 29 July 2014, Kizuki first appeared on THEカラオケ★バトル (The Karaoke★Battle), a televised karaoke competition shown on TV Tokyo. The initial contest was made during various type of professional persons who are concerning to singing, and she got the highest score and won the competition. The second contest was a team event, with various teams of professional singers. Kizuki and her team Amami Ōshima with Kosuke Atari and Mina Ganaha, ultimately won the competition. She has become renowned for her pitch and singing technique, called Guin, a kind of kobushi, in which a single syllable of text is sung while moving between several different notes in succession (this technique being common to her native islands' Shima-uta singing).

Since her premiere on The Karaoke★Battle in 2014, Kizuki has gone on to win ten competitions (most recently in June 2016), and has garnered the nickname 'The absolute Karaoke Queen'.

Outside of karaoke, in 2014 she covered the ending themes to the Korean drama The King's Doctor in Japanese language, and in December 2014 provided Inoriuta – Toutoganasi, an ending song for the NHK World programme J-Melo, an English-language programme aimed at exploring Japanese music.

On 21 January 2015, her first cover album Sakuranagashi (サクラナガシ, lit. "Rainy Season of Cherry Brossoms") was released, featuring many songs covered on The Karaoke★Battle. On 17 June 2015, her second cover album, Minamikaze (ミナミカゼ, lit. "Southern Wind") was released.

She also won a championship on a Fuji Television program "The 5th Championship of Impersonators" on 11 December 2015, by imitating Ayumi Hamasaki, Superfly and Chitose Hajime during 28 professional impressionists and singers.

=== Radio personality ===
She is doing radio personality at two stations. She is in charge of radio personality with "Music Delivery of Kizuki Minami" (formerly "Emotional Beat, Music Airport") on Rainbow Town FM in Koto Ward, Tokyo since January 2014. It is a monthly program on the third Tuesday of every month (21:00 – 22:00 JST). She is also in charge of radio personality "AiRadio! of Kizuki Minami" on FM Kagoshima since April 2017. It is a weekly program on Saturday (19;30 – 19:55 JST).

== Personal life ==
On 29 August 2026, she announced her marriage and pregnancy of her first child.

== Discography ==
=== Original albums ===
- 2009: Kana Itoshikihitoyo (加那ーイトシキヒトヨー) (19 August 2009, PCCA-3734, (PCCA-3733 for CD/DVD set))
- 2014: Ayahabura (綾蝶 〜アヤハブラ〜) (26 February 2014, PCCA-3998)
- 2015: Toutoganashi (尊々加那志 〜トウトガナシ〜) (4 November 2015, PCCA-04286)
- 2016: Gekka Bijin (月下美人) (16 November 2016, PCCA-04433)
- 2019: one (one) (18 December 2019, PCCA-04878 (PCCA-04877 for CD/DVD set))

=== Cover albums ===
- 2015: Sakura Nagashi サクラナガシ (21 January 2015, PCCA-04146. Early releases included bonus CD "Aitsumugi 2015" (アイツムギ2015))
- 2015: Minami Kaze ミナミカゼ (17 June 2015, PCCA-04231. Early releases included bonus CD "Warabigami – Watashi No Takaramono 2015" (童神 〜私の宝物〜2015))
- 2017: Yukimachizuki ユキマチヅキ (22 November 2017, PCCA-04593. Including a new original song "Sayonara yori mo tsutaeta katta koto (What I wanted to tell you rather than goodbye.)" (サヨナラよりも伝えたかったこと))

=== Singles ===
Comprehensive list available on Japanese page (in Japanese)

- Aitsumugi c/w Piano (7 January 2009. PCCA-70232)
- Dareka no tameni / Wasurenagusa / Hikari (15 April 2009. PCCA-02890)
- Shiroi Tsuki / Hikari Sasu Michi / Shiokaze to Kogarashi (22 July 2009. PCCA-02937)
- Luna Regaro – Tsuki Karano Okurimono / Lily / Kimino Tameni (17 March 2010. PCCA-03098)
- Warabigami – Watashino Takaramono / Hoshi No Saku Michi (14 April 2010. PCCA-70279)
- Kizashi/ Zutto Zutto / Izayoi (7 September 2011. PCCA-03462)
- Aitsumugi / Siawase No Tane (20 June 2012. PCCA-70338)
- Yumemachi Ressha (6 March 2013. PCCA-70363. PCCA-03800 CD/DVD set)
- Choen ae ji eo / Amma / Sayonakidori (20 November 2013. PCCA-03938)
- Tada Hitotsu / Kanashikutemo / Inochi no Hashi (19 November 2014. PCCA-04124)
- Anata ni Aete Yokatta / Mikansei no Sekai / Aitai (19 July 2017. PCCA-04554)
- Segodon Kikou Amami Ōshima& Okinoerabujima version / Ai kana / Ai Kanadete (20 June 2018. PCCA-04693) [Songs of the NHK taiga drama ("Segodon")]

=== Co-works ===
Comprehensive list available on Japanese page (in Japanese)

=== Others ===
Sold only at the live venue/official site.

- Music Clip Collection (July 2018. BRBP-00077) (17 music videos are included.)
  - DVD:It contains all the music videos released so far and stored music videos.
  - CD:Hitotsu ni naretanara (lyrics and composition: Minami Kizuki)
- Tôi Yakusoku (December 2018.)
  - CD:Tôi Yakusoku / Ichirin no hana / Kokoro no uta (All the lyrics and compositions are written by Minami Kizuki)
  - DVD:Tôi Yakusoku (Making documentary)/Mangetsu no Yūbe (studio live version)/Minami Kizuki's special Interview
- 10th anniversary best albums (8 May 2019. PCCA-04779(with DVD), PCCA-04780(without DVD))
  - CD:An original best album and a cover best album
  - DVD:The 10th anniversary live concert
