= Sheryl Sheinafia =

Indonesian singer and media personality (born 1996)

- Born: Sheryl Sheinafia Tjokro; 4 December 1996 (age 29); Jakarta, Indonesia
- Genres: Pop; R&B
- Occupations: Singer, songwriter, actress
- Instruments: Vocal; guitar; piano
- Label: Musica Studios (2013–2022) Safe Space Studios (2022-now)

Sheryl Sheinafia Tjokro or professionally known as Sheryl Sheinafia is an Indonesian singer and former TV show co-host, most known for her hit song ‘Kutunggu Kau Putus’ and appearance on NET TV’s Breakout.

Following the commercial success of her debut album, she was selected as a co-host for a music show called "Breakout" on NET TV in 2014. This proved to be a quintessential role that expanded Sheryl's career both as a media presence and presenter without disregarding her passion for music.

Aside from commercial success, her music has proven to be critically acclaimed. Her hit single ‘Kutunggu Kau Putus’, in collaboration with Ariel (the lead singer of the band NOAH), earned a nomination for best pop collaboration in the Anugerah Musik Indonesia Awards. She ended up winning in a similar category (best duo/group/group performance/collaboration in R&B and Soul) 2 years later with her single ‘I Don't Mind’ in collaboration with Vidi Aldiano and Jevin Julian.

Her acting career is nothing short of outstanding, landing several leading roles in an array of films across different genres: Koala Kumal (2016), Galih & Ratna (2017), Bebas (2019), Wedding Proposal (2021), and her most recent horror hit, Tumbang Kanjeng Iblis (2022). Excellence proves to be a consistent theme throughout Sheryl's career as she continues to perform across the board. In 2016 she received the title "Breakthrough Actress of the Year" for her performance in Koala Kumal (2016) and 5 years later followed up with winning "Best Actress in a Comedy Film" for her performance in Wedding Proposal (2021).

== Early life and musical career ==
Born on 4 December 1996, Sheryl Sheinafia kicked off her career as a musician in 2009, later releasing a self-titled debut album under music label Musica Studios in 2013. Despite it being Sheryl's first project, the album met commercial success, producing chart-topping hits such as ‘Rasa Sunyi’. Her second album ‘ii’ proved to be even more successful, solidifying her position as a household name both in Musica's catalog and in the Indonesian pop scene. The album is home to two of Sheryl's biggest Indonesian hits, ‘Kutunggu Kau Putus’ and ‘Kedua Kalinya’, with the latter of the two used as a soundtrack for one of Indonesia's biggest comedy films, Raditya Dika’s Koala Kumal (2016).

Due to a flourishing acting career and landing subsequent leading roles in numerous high-profile films, Sheryl Sheinafia would not release another album for the next 4 years. Unable to take a hiatus from music, she instead diverted her focus to releasing singles to strengthen her discography. In 2017, she released her self-written hit ‘Sweet Talk’ produced by Tushar Apte, whose discography includes producing for world-renowned artists such as Chris Brown, BTS, Demi Lovato and many others. Surpassing the success of ‘Kutunggu Kau Putus’, ‘Sweet Talk’ became the biggest release of her career. Alongside winning "Best Collaborative Work" at the AMI Awards, its music video also won "Best Music Video of the Year" at the SCTV 2018 awards. The single also marks the start of a series of releases fully written in English, starting with ‘Fix You Up’ followed by ‘I Don't Mind’ and ending with ‘Dream High’. Other than the critically acclaimed ‘I Don't Mind’ collaboration, the trio also included ‘Dream High’, the official song for the 2018 Asian Paralympic Games.

In 2019, she released her single ‘Positif’, a cover of Naif's ‘Posesif’ in collaboration with Danone-Aqua, as an effort to raise awareness on mindful plastic consumption and shine a spotlight on sustainability.

Looking to end her album hiatus in 2020, Sheryl Sheinafia traveled to the US to carry out a workshop to produce a 3-song EP under a partnership between Musica Studios and Empire Asia. Other than being an international collaboration between two big labels, the highlights of the project included having Grammy-nominated producer Tha Aristocrats produce the first single off the trilogy, "Want Ur Love". However, due to the COVID-19 outbreak, the release of the project was delayed and postponed until further notice. Refusing to be discouraged, Sheryl Sheinafia would then go on to carry out her single rollout that eventually led to the release of her third studio album under Musica and first album written fully in English, ‘Jennovine’, on 15 January 2021.

The concept for the album started with a dream Sheryl Sheinafia had as a 13-year-old. She dreamt of childbirth but instead of giving birth to a child, she was met with a guitar, to which she named ‘Jennovine’. The album shows Sheryl coming to terms with maturity both as an adult but more importantly as a musician, letting go of the past and reliving childhood ambitions in an era of adulthood. ‘Jennovine’ is easily crowned her best pop project to date, exploring artistry and lyricism like never before. Embracing her collaborative spirit, the album features appearances from fellow Indonesian artists Ariel Nayaka, Rendy Pandugo and Pamungkas. Alongside direct features, Petra Sihombing and Gamaliel also bear producer credits.

Not long after ‘Jennovine’, the trilogy with Empire was picked up and mastered for release, starting with ‘Want Ur Love’ at the end of 2021, followed by ‘Earn It’ and ‘Dedicate’ in early 2022. The EP became Sheryl's last release under Musica before finally going independent in 2022.

== Discography ==
=== Albums and eps ===
- Sheryl Sheinafia (2013)
- ii (2017)
- Jennovine (2021)
- Want Ur Love Trilogy (2021)
- i am done with you (2024)

=== Singles ===
- Drowning (2010)
- Demi Aku (2012)
- Rasa Sunyi (2013)
- Bla Bla Bla (2013)
- Kita Berdua (2014)
- Ku Tunggu Kau Putus (2017)
- Kedua Kalinya (2017)
- Gita Cinta (2017)
- Sebatas Teman (2017)
- Sweet Talk (2018)
- Fix You Up (2018)
- I Don't Mind (2018)
- Setia (2019)
- Positif (2019)
- Okay (2020)
- Bye (2020)
- I Wish I Knew Better (2020)
- Déjà vu (2020)
- Lose My Mind (2020)
- Want Ur Love (2021)
- Earn It (2022)
- Dedicate (2022)
- Situationship (2023)
- Dear Mr. Petty (2023)
- Threepeat (2024)
- Kasian (2024)
- Romansa Romansaan (2024)
- Lepas Kendali (2025)
- Siapa Suruh Jatuh Cinta? (2026)
- Sendiri (2026)

== Acting career ==
Before playing starring roles, Sheryl Sheinafia started her acting career with a cameo in Raditya Dika's highly praised comedy film, Marmut Merah Jambu (2014). The part earned her a leading role in Dika's sophomore film, Koala Kumal (2016) to which her performance in the film was critically acclaimed, earning her 3 nominations including one for "Best Newcomer" from the Indonesian Movie Actors Awards. She then went on to play a leading role as Ratna alongside Refal Hady in Lucky Kuswandi's modern take on classic Indonesian romantic drama film Galih & Ratna (2017). The role earned two nominations, including one for "Best Actress in a Leading Role" from the Indonesian Film Festival and further solidified Sheryl's acting career, making her a serious talent to keep an eye out for in the Indonesian acting scene. In that same year, starring alongside Brandon Salim, Sheryl Sheinafia managed to secure another lead role as Ellie in The Underdogs (2017).

Her next big film would not be until 2 years later in which she played Kris in Bebas (2019), the Indonesian adaptation of the Korean film Sunny (2011). Directed by Riri Riza, the nostalgic tribute to high school companionship was a box-office hit and soon after, racked numerous accolades during award season. She went on to star in another romantic comedy in 2021, playing Sissy in Wedding Proposal (2021) alongside other big names such as Dimas Anggara and Slamet Rahardjo.

Although known for her roles as Kris and Ratna, Sheryl's range as an actress extends beyond playing roles in romcoms and dramas. In 2022 she starred in her first horror film, playing Tia in Tumbang Kanjeng Iblis (2022). Despite it being her first horror film, her performance was nothing short of outstanding, with the film selling out theaters nationwide.

=== Filmography ===
Year	Title	Role
2014	Marmut Merah Jambu	Cynthia (cameo)
2016	Koala Kumal	Trisna
2017	Galih & Ratna	Ratna
2017	The Underdogs	Ellie
2019	Bebas	Kris
2021	Wedding Proposal	Sissy
2022	Tumbang Kanjeng Iblis	Tia
2023	Hubungi Agen Gue	Kamila

== Media presence ==
Although known for her career as a musician and actress, her appearance as a co-host on Breakout is notably the most well-known project. Also known as "Breakout Hangout", "Breakout Showcase" and "Breakout Live", "Breakout" is a music program that airs on NET TV. Starring alongside Boy William, Sheryl Sheinafia would often perform both covers and originals on the show.

After more than 4 years of taking a break from hosting her own show, she became one of the many hosts alongside famous MC and actor Dimas Danang for the videocast Lintas Makna, produced by CXO media. Sheryl Sheinafia appeared in a total of 50 episodes, with topics of discussion ranging from intimate subjects such as love and relationships to talking about hustle culture and toxic work environments.

== Brand partnerships ==
Sheryl Sheinafia has also been the face of many brands, starting off with being a brand ambassador for skincare company Izzi in 2014. Continuing on the skincare journey, she would then go on to be a brand ambassador for Garnier the following year and Nivea in 2020.

In 2017, she became the face of ASUS whose partnership also sponsored Sheryl's award-winning music video for ‘Sweet Talk’. In the subsequent year, she became a brand ambassador for Adidas before becoming the face of Kapal Api, for whom she also produced a jingle in 2019. That same year, she partnered with Danone-Aqua to release a campaign on raising awareness on the importance of recycling and sustainable plastic consumption. Alongside partnerships with Kapal Api and Danone-Aqua, she was a brand ambassador for smartphone giant Vivo. In 2020, she became the main brand ambassador for yoghurt-drink Delicyo, for which she also wrote and produced a jingle.

Brand Deals
Year	Brand
2014	Izzi
2015	Garnier
2017	ASUS
2018	Adidas
2019	Kapal Api Danone Aqua VIVO
2020	Delicyo
2022	SK-II
2023	Hyundai

== Awards and nominations ==
Year	Award	Category	Recipients	Result
Indonesian Movie Actors Awards	2017	Pendatang Baru Terbaik	Koala Kumal	Nominated
Indonesian Movie Actors Awards	2017	Pendatang Baru Terfavorit	Koala Kumal	Nominated
Indonesian Box Office Movie Awards	2017	Pemeran Pendukung Wanita Terbaik	Koala Kumal	Nominated
Indonesian Box Office Movie Awards	2017	Original Soundtrack Terbaik	"Kedua Kalinya" – (OST. Koala Kumal)	Nominated
Festival Film Bandung	2017	Pemeran Utama Wanita Terpuji Film Bioskop	Galih & Ratna	Nominated
Festival Film Indonesia	2017	Pemeran Utama Wanita Terbaik	Galih & Ratna	Nominated
Piala Maya	2016	Aktris Pendatang Baru Terpilih	Koala Kumal	Won
Piala Maya	2019	Video Musik Terpilih	"Sweet Talk" (bersama Rizky Febian & Chandra Liow) Diarahkan oleh Milky Way Production	Nominated
Piala Maya	2020	Lagu Tema Terpilih	"Bebas" (bersama Iwa K, Maizura & Agatha Pricilla) – (OST. Bebas) Pencipta Lagu: Iwa K, R. Yudis Dwikorana, dan Toriawan Sudarsono	Nominated
Festival Film Wartawan Indonesia	2021	Aktris Utama Terbaik – Genre Film Komedi	Wedding Proposal	Won
