= Ashilla Zee =

Ashilla Zahrantiara
- Also known as: Shilla, Ashilla Zee, Shilla
- Born: Ashilla Zahrantiara; 25 February 1997 (age 29); South Tangerang, Indonesia
- Genres: Pop, dance, electropop, pop rock
- Occupations: Singer, songwriter
- Instruments: Vocals, piano, Guitar, Bass
- Years active: 2008–present
- Label: drm digital music
- Website: ashillatv.com

Ashilla Zahrantiara (born 25 February 1997) is a pop/rock singer from Indonesia who started out on the talent show Idola Cilik Season One. She is one of the primary shapers of Blink and Girlband Indonesia. Now, she is focusing on a solo career.

== Life and career ==
Ashilla was born with the full name Ashilla Zahrantiara. As a child she displayed artistic and musical talent, and loved to sing.

As reported on Idola Cilik, Shilla and Shanin jointly registered for an audition through the internet. Unfortunately, Shanin did not pass the audition of Idola Cilik in 2008, necessary to making the first step in pursuing a career even though he was eliminated in the top 10 of Idola Cilik Season One.

=== Blink and Putih Abu-Abu ===
After completing a three-year contract with her old management, Shilla was offered the chance to join My Stars Management who were in the early stages of forming a music group (which was eventually named Blink). Shilla joined, and then Blink was born with five members on July 23, 2011. Shilla starred in the soap opera White Gray and Special Concert White Grey, along with taking part in a duet with Last Child (band). Blink also lined up to read nominations on the mat SCTV Music Awards 2012. Not long after, rumours about the release of Shilla, and the folding of Blink started, from May 2012. This rumour was finally answered on July 5, 2012, through soap opera White Gray. Shilla had actually officially resigned from Blink at the beginning of June 2012 when Blink began using StarSeven Management. This was confirmed July 2012, ending growing speculation on various online news sites. Shilla joined StarSeven Management to further her career in June 2012.

=== Solo career ===
Following splitting from Blink, Shilla went back to using her old stage name Zee Ashilla or Ashilla Zee (Zee from Zahrantiara). As a soloist, Shilla pursued collaborations with musicians she had once known. Shilla began exploring the pop music of the previous progressive rock trend to pop on Masih Cinta. Shilla's second single, titled Curiga was released on August 7, 2012, on the soap opera White Gray Shilla then entered into drm digital music under the auspices of the Last Child (band) and released a single entitled Bieb in December 2012.

== Discography ==
=== Album and Single ===
- Gapai Bintangmu (All Finalists Idola Cilik 1) (2008)
- Masih Cinta (2012)
- Curiga (2012)
- PHP (2012)
- #BIEB (2012)

=== Television ===
- Musikal Laskar Pelangi (2010)
- Putih Abu-Abu (2012)
