= Iwa K =

Rapper

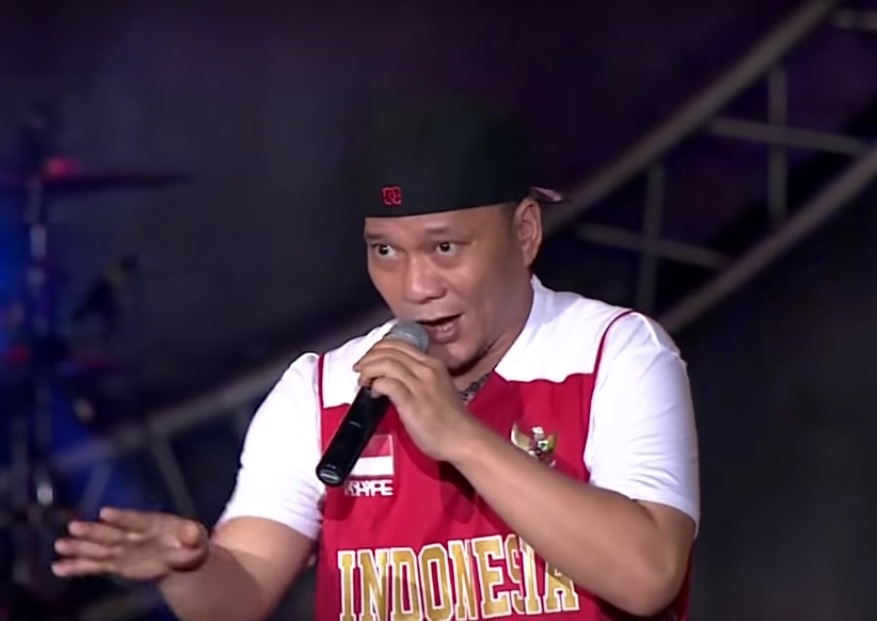
- Iwa K Live at Konser Kemerdekaan Netmediatama in 2016

Background information
- Born: Iwa Kusuma; 25 October 1970 (age 55); Bandung, Indonesia
- Genres: Hip hop
- Occupations: Rapper; singer; songwriter; TV presenter; actor
- Instrument: Vocals
- Years active: 1990–present

Iwa Kusuma, also known as Iwa K (born 25 October 1970) is an Indonesian rapper, singer, songwriter, TV presenter, and actor.

Kusuma was born in Bandung, Indonesia. He was a pioneer in Indonesian hip hop music and since his successful career in 1990s, he has become an icon of the nation's hip hop music genre. He began his musical career in the late 1980s. He is the first Indonesian rapper to have released a full-length album (Kuingin Kembali in 1992). He is also the best selling Indonesian rapper to date. Iwa has won an Indonesian Music Award for Best Rap Performance in 1999. His album with Guest Band, Ta'kan, gained a place at #131 in Rolling Stone Indonesia magazine's "150 Greatest Indonesian Albums of All Time" list. His debut solo album, Ku Ingin Kembali, also included in the list at #117. One of his songs, "Bebas" (1995) ranked #36 in Rolling Stone's "150 Greatest Indonesian Songs of All Time" list.

== Discography ==
Guest Band

- Ta'kan (1991)

Solo

- Ku Ingin Kembali (1993)
- Topeng (album) (1994)
- Kramotak (1996)
- Mesin Imajinasi (1998)
- Vini Vidy Vunky (2002)

Ying Yang

- Yang Tak Terpisahkan (2009)
