= List of awards and nominations received by Isyana Sarasvati =

Isyana Sarasvati awards and nominations
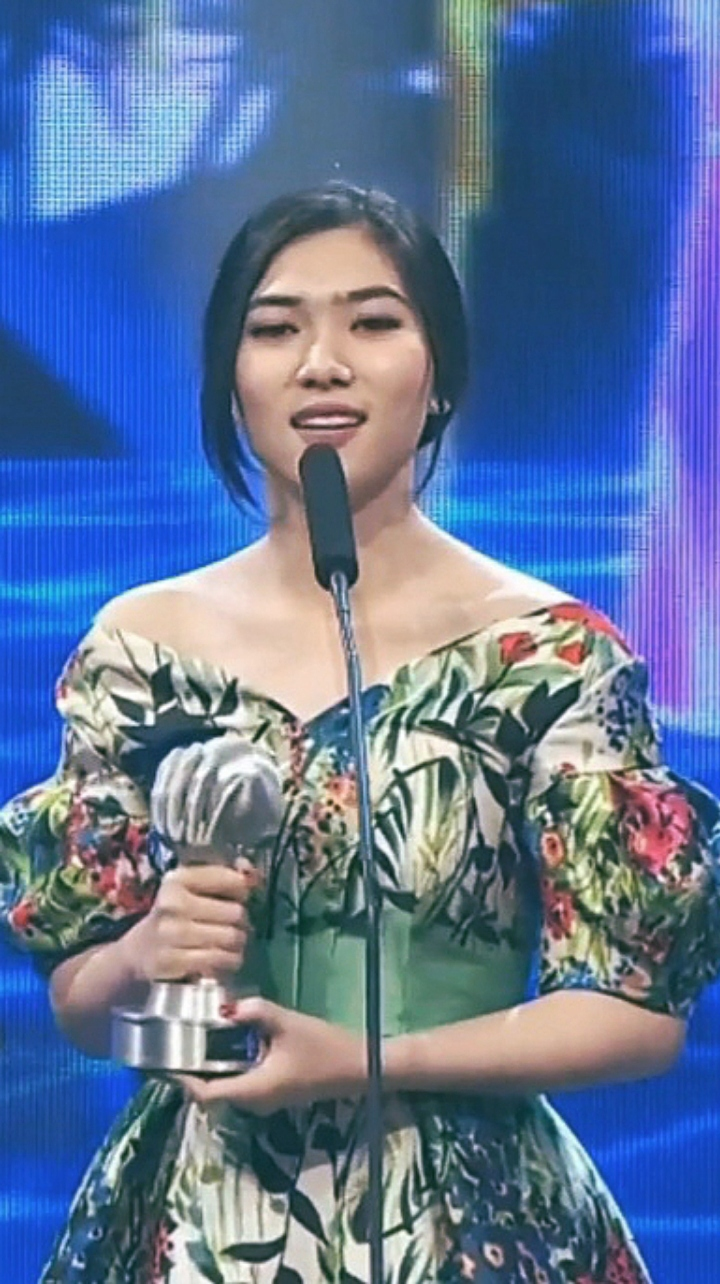
- Isyana Sarasvati has won the 2018 Anugerah Planet Muzik for Best Female Artist
Awards and nominations
Award	Wins	Nominations
Anugerah Musik Indonesia	16	26
Anugerah Planet Muzik	2	11
Bandung Music Awards	3	1
BeautyFest Asia (Popbela Beauty Awards)	1	0
Cornetto Pop Awards	1	1
Dahsyatnya Awards	2	8
Festival Film Indonesia	0	2
Hai Reader's Poll Music Awards	2	2
Inbox Awards	1	3
Indomusik Awards	2	0
Indonesian Box Office Movie Awards	1	1
Indonesian Choice Awards	2	6
Indonesian Movie Actors Awards	0	2
Insert 12th Anniversary VIP Awards	1	0
JawaPos.com Readers Choice Awards	1	0
Kaset Awards	1	0
Kiss Awards	0	2
Line Indonesia Awards	0	2
Line Today Choice	0	1
Mnet Asian Music Awards	2	0
MTV Europe Music Awards	0	1
Nickelodeon Indonesia Kids' Choice Awards	0	2

Totals (Note: Certain award groups do not simply award one winner. They acknowledge several different recipients, have runners-up, and have third place. Since this is a specific recognition and is different from losing an award, runner-up mentions are considered wins in this award tally. For simplification and to avoid errors, each award in this list has been presumed to have had a prior nomination.)
- Wins: 73
- Nominations: 99

Isyana Sarasvati is an Indonesian singer-songwriter. She is the recipient of numerous Indonesian and international awards. Sarasvati is a graduate of Nanyang Academy of Fine Arts and the Royal College of Music in London, she began her journey as a classically trained musician before captivating Indonesia with her distinctive voice and songwriting. She has released five albums: Explore! (2015), Paradox (2017), Lexicon (2019), ISYANA (2023) and Eklektiko (2026).

== Awards and nominations ==
Awards and achievements
Preceded by Fatin Shidqia Lubis	18th Annual Anugerah Musik Indonesia for Best of the Best Newcomer; 2015	Succeeded by Rizky Febian

Name of the award ceremony, year presented, award category, nominee(s) of the award and the result of the nomination
Awards	Year	Category	Nomination	Result	Ref.
Anugerah Musik Indonesia	2015	Best of the Best Newcomer	"Tetap Dalam Jiwa"	Won	
Anugerah Musik Indonesia	2015	Best Soul/R&B/Urban Solo Artist	"Keep Being You"	Won	
Anugerah Musik Indonesia	2016	Best Soul/R&B/Urban Duo/Group/Collaboration	"Kau Adalah" (feat Rayi Putra)	Won	
Anugerah Musik Indonesia	2016	Best of the Best R&B/Urban Album	Explore!	Won	
Anugerah Musik Indonesia	2016	Best of the Best Album	Explore!	Nominated	
Anugerah Musik Indonesia	2016	Best Pop Female Solo Artist	"Mimpi"	Nominated	
Anugerah Musik Indonesia	2016	Best of the Best Production Work	"Kau Adalah" (feat Rayi Putra)	Nominated	
Anugerah Musik Indonesia	2016	Best Collaborative Production Work	"Kau Adalah" (feat Rayi Putra)	Nominated	
Anugerah Musik Indonesia	2017	Best Pop Female Solo Artist	"Cinta Pertama"	Nominated	
Anugerah Musik Indonesia	2017	Best Pop Songwriting	"Cinta Pertama"	Nominated	
Anugerah Musik Indonesia	2017	Best Soul/R&B/Urban Duo/Group/Collaboration	"Anganku Anganmu" (feat Raisa)	Won	
Anugerah Musik Indonesia	2017	Best Collaborative Production Work	"Anganku Anganmu" (feat Raisa)	Won	
Anugerah Musik Indonesia	2017	Best of the Best Production Work	"Anganku Anganmu" (feat Raisa)	Nominated	
Anugerah Musik Indonesia	2017	Best Original Soundtrack Production Work	"Sekali Lagi"	Nominated	
Anugerah Musik Indonesia	2018	Best Soul/R&B Solo Artist	"Winter Song"	Won	
Anugerah Musik Indonesia	2018	Best Soul/R&B Duo/Group/Collaboration	"Terpesona" (feat Gamaliel Tapiheru)	Nominated	
Anugerah Musik Indonesia	2018	Best Urban Production Work	"Heaven" (feat Afgan & Rendy Pandugo)	Won	
Anugerah Musik Indonesia	2018	Best Collaborative Production Work	"Heaven" (feat Afgan & Rendy Pandugo)	Nominated	
Anugerah Musik Indonesia	2019	Best Urban Solo Artist	"Stargazing"	Nominated	
Anugerah Musik Indonesia	2019	Best Urban Production Work	"Feel So Right" (feat Afgan & Rendy Pandugo)	Nominated	
Anugerah Musik Indonesia	2019	Best Rearrangement Production Work	"Lagu Cinta" (feat Afgan & Rendy Pandugo)	Nominated	
Anugerah Musik Indonesia	2020	Best Progressive Production Work	"Sikap Duniawi"	Won	
Anugerah Musik Indonesia	2020	Best of the Best Album	Lexicon	Nominated	
Anugerah Musik Indonesia	2020	Best Pop Female Solo Artist	"Untuk Hati yang Terluka."	Nominated	
Anugerah Musik Indonesia	2020	Best Pop Songwriting	"Untuk Hati yang Terluka."	Nominated	
Anugerah Musik Indonesia	2021	Best of the Best Production Work	"Unlock the Key"	Nominated	
Anugerah Musik Indonesia	2021	Best Progressive Production Work	"Unlock the Key"	Won	
Anugerah Musik Indonesia	2022	Best Metal Duo/Group/Collaboration Artist	"Il Sogno" (feat Deadsquad)	Won	
Anugerah Musik Indonesia	2022	Best Progressive Production Work	"my Mystery"	Won	
Anugerah Musik Indonesia	2023	Best of the Best Album	ISYANA	Won	
Anugerah Musik Indonesia	2023	Best of the Best Production Work	"mindblowing!"	Nominated	
Anugerah Musik Indonesia	2023	Best Rock/Instrumental Solo Artist	"mindblowing!"	Won	
Anugerah Musik Indonesia	2023	Best Progressive Production Work	"Under God's Plan" (feat Mantra Vutura)	Nominated	
Anugerah Musik Indonesia	2023	Best Recording Producer	"mindblowing!" (Sarasvati with Kenan Loui)	Nominated	
Anugerah Musik Indonesia	2024	Best Rock Solo Artist	Ada-Ada Aja	Won	
Anugerah Musik Indonesia	2026	Best of the Best Album	Eklektiko	Nominated	
Anugerah Musik Indonesia	2026	Best Progressive Production Work	"BURN"	Won	
Anugerah Musik Indonesia	2026	Best Recording Producer	"BURN" (Sarasvati with Kenan Loui)	Nominated	
Anugerah Musik Indonesia	2026	Best Instrumental Production Work	"The Final Curtain"	Nominated	
Anugerah Musik Indonesia	2026	Best Soul/R&B Duo/Group/Collaboration	"Be Alright" (feat Kamga)	Nominated	
Anugerah Musik Indonesia	2026	Best Orchestral Production Work	"Garuda di Dadaku" (Original Soundtrack from Garuda di Dadaku Animation Film) (Sarasvati with Kenan Loui)	Nominated	
Anugerah Musik Indonesia	2026	Best Original Soundtrack Production Work	"Bunga Terakhir" (OST Panji Tengkorak) (feat Iwan Fals)	Nominated	
Anugerah Planet Muzik	2016	Best Female Artist	"Kau Adalah" (feat Rayi Putra)	Nominated	
Anugerah Planet Muzik	2016	Most Popular Song	"Kau Adalah" (feat Rayi Putra)	Nominated	
Anugerah Planet Muzik	2016	Most Popular Artist	Isyana Sarasvati	Nominated	
Anugerah Planet Muzik	2016	Social Media Icon	Isyana Sarasvati	Nominated	
Anugerah Planet Muzik	2017	Best Female Artist	"Mimpi"	Nominated	
Anugerah Planet Muzik	2017	Best Duo/Group	"Anganku Anganmu" (feat Raisa)	Nominated	
Anugerah Planet Muzik	2017	Best Song (Indonesia)	"Anganku Anganmu" (feat Raisa)	Won	
Anugerah Planet Muzik	2017	Social Media Icon	Isyana Sarasvati	Nominated	
Anugerah Planet Muzik	2018	Best Female Artist	"Lembaran Buku"	Won	
Anugerah Planet Muzik	2018	Best Song (Indonesia)	"Lembaran Buku"	Nominated	
Anugerah Planet Muzik	2018	Most Popular Song	"Lembaran Buku"	Nominated	
Anugerah Planet Muzik	2018	Most Popular Artist	Isyana Sarasvati	Nominated	
Anugerah Planet Muzik	2018	Social Media Icon	Isyana Sarasvati	Nominated	
Bandung Music Awards	2022	Best Rock Production	"Il Sogno"	Won	
Bandung Music Awards	2022	Most Popular Female Rock	"Il Sogno"	Won	
Bandung Music Awards	2022	Most Popular Solo Artist	Isyana Sarasvati	Nominated	
Bandung Music Awards	2023	Most Popular Female Rock	"my Mystery"	Won	
Cornetto Pop Awards	2017	Favorite Pop Song Collaboration	"Anganku Anganmu" (feat Raisa)	Won	
Cornetto Pop Awards	2017	Favorite Female Singer	Isyana Sarasvati	Nominated	
Dahsyatnya Awards	2016	Outstanding Newcomer	Isyana Sarasvati	Nominated	
Dahsyatnya Awards	2016	Outstanding Song	"Tetap Dalam Jiwa"	Nominated	
Dahsyatnya Awards	2016	Outstanding Collaboration	"Kau Adalah" (feat Rayi Putra)	Nominated	
Dahsyatnya Awards	2017	Outstanding Female Artist	Isyana Sarasvati	Nominated	
Dahsyatnya Awards	2017	Outstanding Music Video	"Mimpi"	Won	
Dahsyatnya Awards	2017	Outstanding Song	"Mimpi"	Nominated	
Dahsyatnya Awards	2018	Outstanding Female Artist	Isyana Sarasvati	Nominated	
Dahsyatnya Awards	2018	Outstanding Duo/Collaboration	"Anganku Anganmu" (feat Raisa)	Won	
Dahsyatnya Awards	2018	Outstanding Song	"Anganku Anganmu" (feat Raisa)	Nominated	
Dahsyatnya Awards	2019	Outstanding Female Artist	Isyana Sarasvati	Nominated	
Festival Film Bandung	2024	Best Supporting Act	Petualangan Sherina 2	Nominated	
Indonesian Film Festival	2017	Best Theme Song	"Sekali Lagi"	Nominated	
Indonesian Film Festival	2019	Best Theme Song	"Luruh" (feat Rara Sekar)	Nominated	
Hai Reader's Poll Music Award	2015	The Best Fresh Meat	Isyana Sarasvati	Won	
Hai Reader's Poll Music Award	2015	The Best Female	Isyana Sarasvati	Won	
Hai Reader's Poll Music Award	2015	The Best Pop	Isyana Sarasvati	Nominated	
Hai Reader's Poll Music Award	2015	The Best Single	"Tetap Dalam Jiwa"	Nominated	
Inbox Awards	2015	Favorite Newcomer	Isyana Sarasvati	Won	
Inbox Awards	2015	Most Darling Social Media Artist	Isyana Sarasvati	Nominated	
Inbox Awards	2016	Most Inbox Female Solo Singer	Isyana Sarasvati	Nominated	
Inbox Awards	2016	Most Inbox Song	"Kau Adalah" (feat Rayi Putra)	Nominated	
Indomusik Awards	2026	Artwork Album/Single/EP Vote by Sobat Musik	Eklektiko	Won	
Indomusik Awards	2026	Metal Song Vote by Sobat Musik	"Babel"	Won	
Indonesian Box Office Movie Awards	2019	Best Original Soundtarck	"Luruh" (feat Rara Sekar)	Won	
Indonesian Box Office Movie Awards	2019	Best Newcomer	Milly & Mamet	Nominated	
Indonesian Choice Awards	2015	Female Singer of the Year	Isyana Sarasvati	Nominated	
Indonesian Choice Awards	2015	Breakthrough Artist of the Year	Isyana Sarasvati	Nominated	
Indonesian Choice Awards	2016	Female Singer of the Year	Isyana Sarasvati	Won	
Indonesian Choice Awards	2016	Album of the Year	Explore!	Won	
Indonesian Choice Awards	2016	Song of the Year	"Kau Adalah" (feat Rayi Putra)	Nominated	
Indonesian Choice Awards	2018	Female Singer of the Year	Isyana Sarasvati	Nominated	
Indonesian Choice Awards	2018	Album of the Year	Paradox	Nominated	
Indonesian Choice Awards	2018	Song of the Year	"Anganku Anganmu" (feat Raisa)	Nominated	
Indonesian Movie Actors Awards	2019	Favorite Newcomer	Milly & Mamet	Nominated	
Indonesian Movie Actors Awards	2019	Best Newcomer	Milly & Mamet	Nominated	
Infotainment Awards	2016	The Most Alluring Newcomer	Isyana Sarasvati	Nominated	
Infotainment Awards	2016	Celebrity of the Year	Isyana Sarasvati	Nominated	
Infotainment Awards	2016	The Most Awaited Celebrity	Isyana Sarasvati	Nominated	
Infotainment Awards	2016	Most Alluring Female Celebrity	Isyana Sarasvati	Nominated	
Insert 12th Anniversary VIP Awards	2015	The Hottest Newcomer	Isyana Sarasvati	Won	
JawaPos.com Readers Choice Awards	2017	Favorite Female Singer	Isyana Sarasvati	Won	
Kaset Awards	2023	Best Female Solo Artist	Isyana Sarasvati	Won	
Kiss Awards	2020	Best Pop Female Singer	Isyana Sarasvati	Nominated	
Kiss Awards	2022	Best Pop Female Singer	Isyana Sarasvati	Nominated	
LINE Indonesia Awards	2019	Favorite Female Singer	Isyana Sarasvati	Nominated	
LINE Indonesia Awards	2019	Favorite Duo/Group	Trio AIR (feat Afgan & Rendy Pandugo)	Nominated	
LINE Today Choice	2021	Favorite Female Singer	Isyana Sarasvati	Nominated	
Mnet Asian Music Awards	2016	Best Asian Artist Indonesia	Isyana Sarasvati	Won	
Mnet Asian Music Awards	2017	Best Composer of the Year	"Anganku Anganmu" (with Raisa)	Won	
MTV Europe Music Awards	2017	Best South East Asia Act	Isyana Sarasvati	Nominated	
Nickelodeon Indonesia Kids' Choice Awards	2016	Favorite Singer	Isyana Sarasvati	Nominated	
Nickelodeon Indonesia Kids' Choice Awards	2016	Favorite Song (Indonesia)	"Tetap Dalam Jiwa"	Nominated	
OZ Radio Bandung FM Awards	2016	Most Friendly Female Singer	Isyana Sarasvati	Nominated	
OZ Radio Bandung FM Awards	2017	Most Friendly Female Singer	Isyana Sarasvati	Nominated	
OZ Radio Bandung FM Awards	2017	Most Friendly Collaboration	"Kau Adalah" (feat Rayi Putra)	Won	
Pahlawan Musik Lokal Jak FM Awards	2020	Favorite Female Hero	Isyana Sarasvati	Nominated	
Pahlawan Musik Lokal Jak FM Awards	2020	Favorite Virtual Concert	Lexicon+ Virtual Home Concert	Won	
Piala Maya	2017	Best Theme Song	"Sekali Lagi"	Nominated	
Piala Maya	2018	Best Music Video	"Winter Song"	Won	
Piala Maya	2018	Impressive Short Appearance	Milly & Mamet	Nominated	
Piala Maya	2019	Best Music Video	"Sikap Duniawi"	Won	
Piala Maya	2019	Best Theme Song	"Untuk Hati yang Terluka."	Nominated	
Piala Maya	2022	Best Music Video	"Il Sogno"	Won	
Pop Asia Awards	2025	Best of Solo Concert in 2024	Lost In Harmony	Nominated	
RCTI+ Indonesian Digital Awards	2021	Most Favorite Judges Talent Search	The Voice Kids Indonesia Season 4	Nominated	
Rolling Stone Editor's Choice Awards	2016	The Phenomenal	Isyana Sarasvati	Won	
SCTV Awards	2015	Most Popular Singer	Isyana Sarasvati	Nominated	
SCTV Awards	2016	Most Popular Singer	Isyana Sarasvati	Nominated	
SCTV Music Awards	2016	Most Popular Song	"Tetap Dalam Jiwa"	Nominated	
SCTV Music Awards	2016	Most Popular Music Video	"Tetap Dalam Jiwa"	Won	
SCTV Music Awards	2017	Most Popular Female Artist	Isyana Sarasvati	Nominated	
SCTV Music Awards	2017	Most Popular Collaboration	"Anganku Anganmu" (feat Raisa)	Won	
SCTV Music Awards	2017	Most Popular Music Video	"Anganku Anganmu" (feat Raisa)	Nominated	
SCTV Music Awards	2018	Most Popular Female Solo Singer	Isyana Sarasvati	Nominated	
SCTV Music Awards	2018	Most Popular Collaboration	"Heaven" (feat Afgan & Rendy Pandugo)	Won	
SCTV Music Awards	2019	Most Popular Female Singer	Isyana Sarasvati	Nominated	
SCTV Music Awards	2019	Most Popular Collaboration	"Feel So Right" (feat Afgan & Rendy Pandugo)	Nominated	
SCTV Music Awards	2019	Most Popular Music Video	"Winter Song"	Nominated	
Selebrita Awards	2015	Celebrity Newcomer	Isyana Sarasvati	Nominated	
Selebrita Awards	2016	Popular Song	"Kau Adalah" (feat Rayi Putra)	Nominated	
Selebrita Awards	2017	Popular Song	"Anganku Anganmu" (feat Raisa)	Nominated	
Showbiz Indonesia Awards	2015	Rising Star of the Year	Isyana Sarasvati	Won	
Showbiz Indonesia Awards	2021	Favorite Song	"Il Sogno"	Nominated	
Silet Awards	2015	Tersilet Newcomer	Isyana Sarasvati	Nominated	
Telkomsel Awards	2021	Favorite Female Singer	Isyana Sarasvati	Nominated	
Telkomsel Awards	2024	Favorite Solo Singer	Isyana Sarasvati	Won	
USS Feed Awards	2021	Your Favorite Musician in 2021	Isyana Sarasvati	Won	
Wrappot Awards	2022	Ternyebreng Musician	Isyana Sarasvati	Won	

=== Other awards and honours ===
Publisher name, award name, year, and placement results
Publisher/organizer	Awards	Year	Receiver	Ref.
Bazaar Indonesia	2025 Bazaar Indonesia Icon Musician	2025	Isyana Sarasvati	
BeautyFest Asia (Popbela Beauty Awards) (by Popbela.com)	Inspiring Figure of the Year	2022	Isyana Sarasvati	
Billboard Indonesia x Kompas.com	Best Indonesian Album 2019	2020	Lexicon	
Billboard Indonesia	Women of the Year (Volume 1)	2024	Isyana Sarasvati	
Forbes Asia	Forbes Asia 30 under 30	2020	Isyana Sarasvati	
Forbes Indonesia	Forbes Indonesia 30 under 30	2019	Isyana Sarasvati	
Fortune Indonesia	Fortune Indonesia 40 under 40	2023	Isyana Sarasvati	
GADIS Awards (by GADIS magazine)	Terkibar	2015	Isyana Sarasvati	
Google's Year in Search 2015 (Indonesia)	Celebrity	2015	Isyana Sarasvati	
Google's Year in Search 2016 (Indonesia)	Celebrity	2016	Isyana Sarasvati	
HighEnd	Indonesia Beautiful Woman	2016	Isyana Sarasvati	
HighEnd	The Alpha under 40	2024	Isyana Sarasvati	
HighEnd	Musical Trailblazer of the Year	2026	Isyana Sarasvati	
Ministry of Law and Human Rights	National Intellectual and Copyright Award	2016	Isyana Sarasvati	
Lux Sound of Women (by Lux)	Inspiring Woman	2018	Isyana Sarasvati	
NAFA Distinguished Alumni Medal	NAFA Distinguished Alumni Medal 2023	2023	Isyana Sarasvati	
Tempo Magazine	9 Best Indonesian Music Albums 2019	2020	Lexicon	
Tempo Magazine	9 Best Indonesian Music Albums 2023	2024	ISYANA	
Pop Hari Ini	10 Best Indonesian Music Albums 2019	2020	Lexicon	
Social Media Award (by Marketing Magazine)	Female Singer with Sentiments Positive on Social Media	2017	Isyana Sarasvati	
tirto.id	10 Best Indonesian Music Albums 2019	2020	Lexicon	
Yamaha Gala Concert 2026, Tokyo	Achievement	2026	Isyana Sarasvati	

1. Other award lists are written for awards that do not have a nomination list and only the winners are announced. Including those in the form of listicle.

== Classical Awards ==
=== Vocal (Soprano) ===
International & National

- 2014 Awarded the "RCM Excellence Award (Degree)" Scholarship
- 2013 1st Winner (Grand Prize) Tembang Puitik Ananda Sukarlan National Vocal Competition (Surabaya, Indonesia)
- 2013 Awarded the "NAFA Entry Scholarship (Degree)" (Full Scholarship)
- 2013 Gold Certificate, 5th Bangkok Opera Foundation Singing Competition (Bangkok, Thailand)
- 2012 First Prize, 6th Tan Ngiang Kaw/Tan Ngiang Ann Memorial Vocal Competition (Singapore)
- 2010 Tuition Grant from Singapore MOE for Diploma Study at NAFA

=== Electone ===
International

- 2012 Semi-finalist Yamaha Electone Electone Concours 2011 – Open Age Section (Tokyo, Japan) Yamaha Music Scholarship in Asia (Singapore)
- 2011 Grand Prize, Asia Pacific Electone Festival 2011 – Open Age Section (Singapore)
- 2009 Yamaha Music Scholarship in Asia 2009 (Indonesia)
- 2008 International Junior Original Concert (IJOC) – Top 12 best compositions (Tokyo, Japan)
- 2008 Third Prize, Asia Electone Festival (AEF) 2008 – Junior Section (Indonesia)
- 2005 Grand Prize, Asia Electone Festival (AEF) 2005 – Junior Section (Indonesia)

National

- 2011 Grand Prix Award, Yamaha Electone Festival 2011 – Open Age Section (Singapore)
- 2009 Second Prize, National Yamaha Electone Festival 2009 (Jakarta, Indonesia) Grand Prix Award, Yamaha Electone Festival 2009 – Open Section (Bandung, Indonesia)
- 2008 Grand Prize, National Yamaha Electone Festival 2008, Junior Section (Surabaya, Indonesia)
- 2005 Second Prize, National Yamaha Electone Festival 2005 – Junior Section (Jakarta, Indonesia)

=== Piano ===
National & Regional

- 2010 Finalist, Yamaha Piano Competition Indonesia (Jakarta, Indonesia)
- 2010 First prize, Yamaha Piano Competition West Java Regional (Bandung, Indonesia)
- 2009 First Prize, Piano Competition Pianist Bandung (Bandung, Indonesia)
- 2008 Participant, UPH Chopin Piano Competition (Jakarta, Indonesia)
- 2007 Finalist, Yamaha Piano Competition Indonesia (Jakarta, Indonesia) First prize, Piano Competition West Java Regional (Indonesia)
