= 2021 Maya Awards =

2021 Indonesian film awards

10th Maya Awards
- Awarded for: The achievement in Indonesian cinema
- Presented on: 24–26 March 2022

Highlights
- Best Picture: Yuni
- Most awards: Yuni (7)
- Most nominations: Vengeance Is Mine, All Others Pay Cash (18)

The 10th Maya Awards took place from 24 to 26 March 2022 virtually to honor the achievement in Indonesian cinema released in 2021.

Drama film Yuni received the most awards with seven, including Best Feature Film. Other winners included Vengeance Is Mine, All Others Pay Cash with five, Losmen Bu Broto with three, The Heartbreak Club and Invisible Hopes with two.

== Winners and nominees ==
The nominations were announced on 26 February 2022 on the award's social media. Action black comedy film Vengeance Is Mine, All Others Pay Cash led the nominations with eighteen, followed by Yuni with sixteen, and Losmen Bu Broto with fifteen.

=== Awards ===
Winners are listed first, highlighted in boldface, and indicated with a double dagger (‡).

**Best Feature Film**: **Yuni – Ifa Isfansyah and Chand Parwez Servia**‡; Ali & Ratu Ratu Queens – Muhammad Zaidy and Meiske Taurisia; Aum! – Damar Ardi and Suryo Wiyogo; Backstage – Robert Ronny; The Heartbreak Club – Linda Gozali Arya and Charles Gozali; Losmen Bu Broto – Andi S. Boediman, Pandu Birantoro, and Robert Ronny; Nussa – Ricky Manoppo and Anggia Kharisma; Vengeance Is Mine, All Others Pay Cash – Meiske Taurisia and Muhammad Zaidy
**Best Director**: **Kamila Andini – Yuni**‡; Edwin – Vengeance Is Mine, All Others Pay Cash; Guntur Soeharjanto – Backstage; Ifa Isfansyah and Eddie Cahyono – Losmen Bu Broto; Lucky Kuswandi – Ali & Ratu Ratu Queens	**Iqbal Rais Award for Best Directorial Debut Feature**: **Lamtiar Simorangkir – Invisible Hopes**‡; Bambang "Ipoenk" K. M. – Aum!; Bony Wirasmono – Nussa; Jason Iskandar – Akhirat: A Love Story; Roy Lolang – Bete's Love
**Best Actor in a Leading Role**: **Marthino Lio – Vengeance Is Mine, All Others Pay Cash as Ajo Kawir**‡; Angga Yunanda – First, Second & Third Love as Raja; Chicco Jerikho – Aum! as Panca Kusuma Negara; Iqbaal Ramadhan – Ali & Ratu Ratu Queens as Ali; Jourdy Pranata – One Night Stand as Baskara	**Best Actress in a Leading Role**: **Arawinda Kirana – Yuni as Yuni**‡; Ladya Cheryl – Vengeance Is Mine, All Others Pay Cash as Iteung; Maudy Koesnaedi – Losmen Bu Broto as Mrs. Broto; Putri Marino – First, Second & Third Love as Asia; Sissy Priscillia – Backstage as Sandra
**Best Actor in a Supporting Role**: **Reza Rahadian – Vengeance Is Mine, All Others Pay Cash as Budi Baik**‡; Dimas Aditya – Yuni as Damar; Jefri Nichol – Aum! as Satriya/Surya Jatitama; Kevin Ardilova – Yuni as Yoga; Slamet Rahardjo – First, Second & Third Love as Dewa	**Best Actress in a Supporting Role**: **Putri Marino – Losmen Bu Broto as Pur**‡; Asmara Abigail – Yuni as Suci; Ira Wibowo – First, Second & Third Love as Linda; Marissa Anita – Ali & Ratu Ratu Queens as Mia; Ratu Felisha – Vengeance Is Mine, All Others Pay Cash as Jelita
**Arifin C. Noer Award for Best Brief Memorable Performance**: **Didi Kempot – The Heartbreak Club as himself**‡; Asri Welas – The Heartbreak Club as Wulan; Darius Sinathrya – Losmen Bu Broto as Anton; Dian Sastrowardoyo – Teka-teki Tika as Boss; Rukman Rosadi – Yuni as Yuni's father	**Best Young Performer**: **Daniella Tumiwa – Bete's Love as teen Bete**‡; Anneth Delliecia – Kau & Dia as Anneth; Maisha Kanna – Irreplaceable as Kinanti; Makayla Rose Hilli – June & Kopi as Karin; Zara Leola – The Heaven None Missed 3 as Nadia
**Best Breakthrough Actor**: **Bhisma Mulia – The Heartbreak Club as Jatmiko**‡; Aksara Dena – Aum! as Adam/Bram Sanjaya; Farhan Rasyid – Akhirat: A Love Story as Peter; Omar Daniel – I as Sanjaya; Sal Priadi – Vengeance Is Mine, All Others Pay Cash as Tokek	**Tuti Indra Malaon Award for Best Breakthrough Actress**: **Hanggini – Geez & Ann as Keana "Ann" Amanda**‡; Agnes Natasya Tjie – Aum! as Linda Salim; Sara Fajira – Balada Sepasang Kekasih Gila as Lastri; Sisca JKT48 – The Heartbreak Club as Anjani; Tansri Kemala – Teka-teki Tika as Jane Mikaila
**Best Original Screenplay**: **Yuni – Kamila Andini and Prima Rusdi**‡; Ali & Ratu Ratu Queens – Gina S. Noer; Aum! – Bambang "Ipoenk" K. M. and Gin Teguh; Backstage – Vera Varidia, Robert Ronny, Monty Tiwa, and Titien Wattimena; First, Second & Third Love – Gina S. Noer	**Best Adapted Screenplay**: **Losmen Bu Broto – Alim Sudio; based on the soap opera Losmen by Tatiek Maliyati and Wahyu Sihombing**‡; Friendship is Like a Cocoon – Alim Sudio; based on the soap opera by Frame Ritz; The Heartbreak Club – Bagus Bramanti, Charles Gozali, and Gea Rexy; based on the discography of Didi Kempot; Nussa – Muhammad Nurman Wardi, Widya Arifianti, Bony Wirasmono, Chrisnawan Martantio, Anggia Kharisma, and M. Irfan Ramli; based on the television series by Ricky Manoppo; Vengeance Is Mine, All Others Pay Cash – Edwin and Eka Kurniawan; based on the novel by Kurniawan
**Best Cinematography**: **Yuni – Teoh Gay Hian**‡; Ali & Ratu Ratu Queens – Batara Goempar; Backstage – Hani Pradigya; Losmen Bu Broto – Muhammad Firdaus; Vengeance Is Mine, All Others Pay Cash – Akiko Ashizawa	**Best Art Direction**: **Vengeance Is Mine, All Others Pay Cash – Eros Eflin**‡; Backstage – Fauzi; Kadet 1947 – Frans X. R. Paat; Losmen Bu Broto – Luki Janarko; Yuni – Budi Riyanto Karung
**Best Editing**: **Yuni – Lee Chatametikool and Cesa David Luckmansyah**‡; Backstage – Wawan I. Wibowo; The Heartbreak Club – Ryan Purwoko, Charles Gozali, and Ilham Adinatha; Losmen Bu Broto – Greg Arya and Cesa David Luckmansyah; Vengeance Is Mine, All Others Pay Cash – Lee Chatametikool	**Best Visual Effects**: **Serigala Langit – Keliek Wicaksono**‡; Backstage – Orangeroom CS; Kadet 1947 – Satriya Mahardika; Makmum 2 – Harris Reggy; Vengeance Is Mine, All Others Pay Cash – Rivai Chen
**Best Costume Design**: **Vengeance Is Mine, All Others Pay Cash – Gemaila Gea Geriantiana**‡; A Perfect Fit – Aldie Harra; Ali & Ratu Ratu Queens – Karin Wijaya; Losmen Bu Broto – Hagai Pakan; Yuni – Hagai Pakan	**Best Make-Up & Hair**: **Vengeance Is Mine, All Others Pay Cash – Cherry Wirawan**‡; Ali & Ratu Ratu Queens – Marshya D. Martha; Kadet 1947 – Eba Sheba; Losmen Bu Broto – Safitri Kadarisman; Yuni – Eba Sheba
**Best Sound**: **Makmum 2 – Chandra Pinem and Fourmix Audio Post**‡; Backstage – Mohamad Ikhsan and Lexy F. Komansilan; Losmen Bu Broto – Wahyu Tri Purnomo and Krisna Purna; Vengeance Is Mine, All Others Pay Cash – Akritchalerm Kalayanamitr and Handi Ilfat; Yuni – Lim Ting Li, Wahyu Tri Purnomo, Mohamad Ikhsan, Sutrisno, and Nanda Purwadi Sunardi	**Best Score**: **Losmen Bu Broto – Aghi Narottama, Bemby Gusti, and Tony Merle**‡; Backstage – Andi Rianto; The Heartbreak Club – Nanin Wardhani; Vengeance Is Mine, All Others Pay Cash – Dave Lumenta; Yuni – Ken Jenie, Mar Galo, and Alexis Rault
**Best Theme Song**: **"Melangkah" from Backstage – Written by Andi Rianto and Monty Tiwa; Performed by Sissy Priscillia and Vanesha Prescilla**‡; "Bangun, Bajingan!" from Vengeance Is Mine, All Others Pay Cash – Written by Ananda Badudu, Dave Lumenta and Rubina; Performed by Ananda Badudu, Dave Lumenta, Rubina and Lie Indra Perkasa; "Cidro" from The Heartbreak Club – Written and Performed by Didi Kempot; "Kejutanku" from Nussa – Written by Ifa Fachir and Simhala Avadana; Performed by Widuri Puteri, Muzakki Ramdhan, Ocean Fajar, Ali Fikri, and Malka Hayfa; "Pulang" from Losmen Bu Broto – Written by Mikha Angelo; Performed by Maudy Ayunda	**Best Poster Design**: **Yuni – Alvin Hariz**‡; Incarnation of the Devil 2 – Alvin Hariz; Losmen Bu Broto – Alvin Hariz; Teka-teki Tika – Alvin Hariz; Vengeance Is Mine, All Others Pay Cash – Feransis
**Best Short Film**: **The Adjudication of Diana Hasyim – Angkasa Ramadhan**; Angpao – Stefanus Cancan; Culas – Sabrina Rochelle Kalangie; Dear to Me – Monica Vanesa Tedja; Ibu Ora Sare – Gin Teguh; Please Be Quiet – William Adiguna; Ringroad – Andrew Kose; Udin's Inferno – Yogi S. Calam	**Best Music Video**: **"Il Sogno" by Isyana Sarasvati – Gianni Fajri and Dani Huda**‡; "Benang-Benang Asmara" by Andien – Gianni Fajri; "C.H.R.I.S.Y.E." by Diskoria, Laleilmanino, and Eva Celia – Gianni Fajri; "Far" by Rendy Pandugo – Andrea Wijaya; "Irama Cita" by White Shoes & the Couples Company – Anggun Priambodo; "Markisa" by Cinta Laura Kiehl – Bramsky; "Tenang" by Yura Yunita – Yandy Laurens; "Yang Terdalam" by Noah – Gianni Fajri
**Best Animated Feature Film**: **Nussa – Bony Wirasmono**‡; Adit Sopo Jarwo the Movie – Eki N. F. and Hanung Bramantyo	**Best Animated Short Film**: **Splish Splash – Andra Fembriarto**‡; Diponegoro 1830 – Gata Mahardika and Subiyanto; Dio – Mazaya Azka A; Garuda, Naga & the Curse of Kadru – Gerald Michael Pasaribu; My Clouded Mind – Annisa Adjam
**Best Documentary Feature Film**: **Invisible Hopes – Lamtiar Simorangkir**‡; Catharina Leimena: Show Must Go On – Patar Simatupang; Gelora: Magnumentary of Gedung Saparua – Alvin Yunata; Marapu, Fire & Ritual – Andrew Campbell; Parherek – Onny Kresnawan; Pulau Plastik – Rahung Nasution and Dandhy Dwi Laksono	**Best Documentary Short Film**: **The Age of Remembrance – Sazkia Noor Anggraini**‡; Different Touch in Batik – I Made Suniartika; Ketika Tunas Itu Tumbuh – Kurnia Yudha F.; Lingkar Rombengan – Nada Leo Prakasa; Maramba – Riandhani Yudha Pamungkas

=== Films with multiple nominations and awards ===
Films that received multiple nominations
Nominations	Film
18	Vengeance Is Mine, All Others Pay Cash
16	Yuni
15	Losmen Bu Broto
11	Backstage
9	The Heartbreak Club
8	Ali & Ratu Ratu Queens
7	Aum!
5	First, Second & Third Love
5	Nussa
3	Kadet 1947
3	Teka-teki Tika
2	Akhirat: A Love Story
2	Bete's Love
2	Invisible Hopes
2	Makmum 2

Films that received multiple awards
Awards	Film
7	Yuni
5	Vengeance Is Mine, All Others Pay Cash
3	Losmen Bu Broto
2	The Heartbreak Club
2	Invisible Hopes
