= Isyana =

Isyana is a given name. Notable people with the name include:

- Isyana Sarasvati (born 1993), Indonesian female singer-songwriter
  - Isyana (album), her self-titled 2023 album
- Isyana Tunggawijaya (r. c. 947–985), queen regnant of Mataram Kingdom
  - Isyana dynasty, of the Mataram Kingdom
