= Jaz (singer) =

Bruneian singer

Jaz Hayat
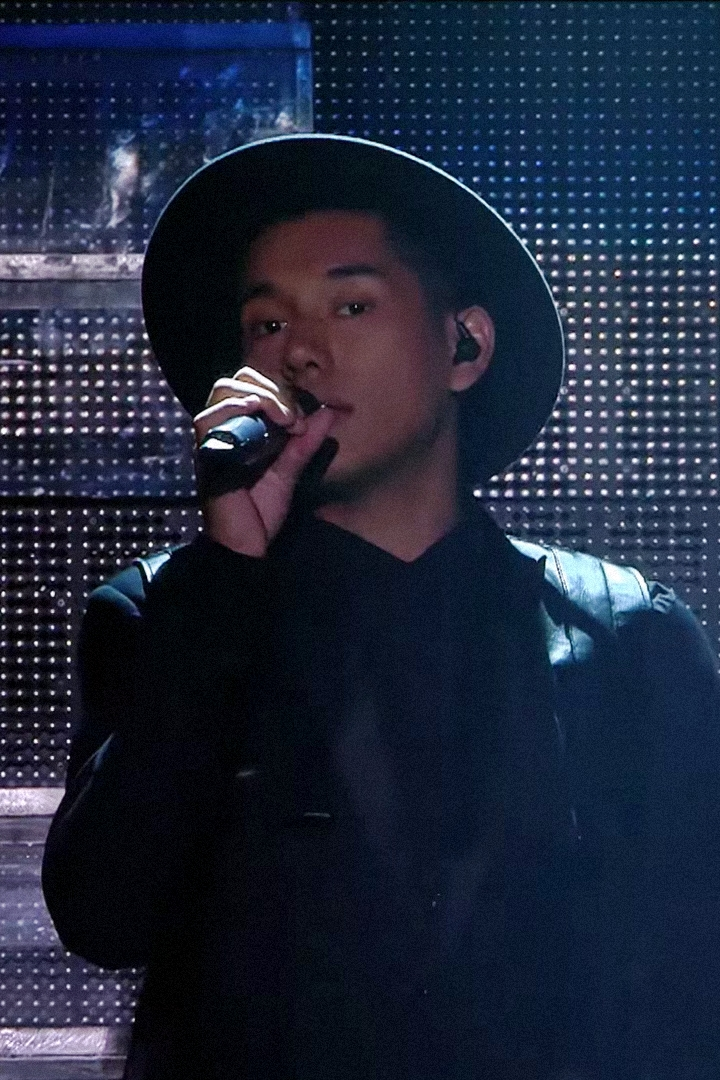
- Jaz while performing in 4th Indonesian Choice Awards

Background information
- Born: Aziz Hayat; 5 March 1993 (age 33); Brunei Darussalam
- Genres: R&B; pop
- Occupation: Singer
- Years active: 2016–present
- Label: Sony Music Indonesia

Aziz Hayat, known by his stage name Jaz (born 5 March 1993) is a Bruneian singer. He released a single titled Dari Mata in 2016 which was well received in the Indonesian music industry.

== Life and career ==
=== 1993–2013: Early life and early career ===
Born in Brunei on 5 March 1993, with the name Aziz Hayat. Jaz was raised by his grandmother since the age of one after his parents divorced. After separating, his mother decided not to remarry. Meanwhile, his father now has a wife from Bogor, West Java, and lives in Brunei. Jaz was then raised by his grandmother. Making him consider his grandmother as his own parents. Jaz wanted to pursue singing, but his grandmother forbade him from singing.

Before seriously pursuing music, Jaz wanted to become a soccer player. Jaz was so serious about pursuing football that he joined the Brunei Darussalam U-16 National Team and participated in a tournament in Thailand in 2007. Jaz was set on becoming a professional soccer athlete. At the time, he considered music as a hobby. That was until he got to know R&B music that he decided to change careers.

Jaz's career began as a singer at weddings. He is also actively writing and recording songs. One of his songs, I Stalk Your Profile, was distributed by Jaz through the video sharing site YouTube. Thanks to the video, Jaz was asked to appear at Anugerah Planet Muzik (APM) in 2013. APM is an award ceremony for musicians in Malay countries such as Indonesia, Singapore, Malaysia, and Brunei.

His performance at APM made Jazz's singing talent known to the public. Record company Sony Music Indonesia then recruited him. Got a record deal, Jaz is happy. But that happiness was disturbed by sad news. Jaz's grandmother died shortly after his appearance on APM. After his grandmother died, Jaz was giddy. He was confused about what to do. Jaz's enthusiasm to become a singer suddenly stopped. But life must go on, Jaz decided to move to Jakarta and continue his dream of becoming a singer. Jaz tries to be an independent person and does not depend on others.

=== 2014–2016: Single From Dari Mata ===
In 2016, Jaz released his first single entitled Dari Mata. From Mata's success in the market, this song has topped the charts on several streaming music services in Indonesia such as Joox and Spotify. The process of creating this song from idea to production is not instant. It took Jaz 4 months to complete the material. In terms of lyrics to the basic melody of the song is his creation.

=== 2017–present: Kasmaran single and debut album project ===
In early 2017, Jaz released his second single entitled Kasmaran. Just like his first single, Kasmaran was successful in the Indonesian music industry. Before this year changed, Jaz apparently didn't want to be satisfied with just two singles, Dari Mata and Kasmaran. He plans to release a third single first before releasing an album. In a chat with detikHOT, Jaz shared a number of plans he has for the next year. Starting from releasing the next single to the album next year. Although the plan was in sight, Jaz admitted that he was still choosing which song he would later line up as his third single. Jaz said the song will be chosen from 10 songs that are the material for the album.

== Singles ==
Title	Year	Highest position	Album
Title	Year	IDN	Album
"Dari Mata"	2016	—	Non-album single
"Kasmaran"	2017	—	Non-album single
"Teman Bahagia"	2018	—	Non-album single
"Berdua Bersama"	2018	—	Milly & Mamet (Original Motion Picture Soundtrack)
"Katakan"	2019	24	Non-album single
"Bagaimana Bisa"	2019	14	Non-album single
"Penipu Cinta"	2020	25	Non-album single
"Shalawat Asyghil"	2021	—	Non-album single
"Lucky Ones"	2021	—	Non-album single
"Aku Butuh Kamu"	2021	—	Non-album single
"Benar Orang Bilang"	2022	—	Non-album single
"Bersamamu"	2023	—	

== Filmography ==
=== Web series ===
Year	Title	Role	Production	Channel
2017	Isyana's Story of Two Rainbows	Jaz	Cornetto Indonesia	YouTube
