= Paradox (Isyana Sarasvati album) =

Studio album by Isyana Sarasvati
- Released: September 1, 2017
- Recorded: 2017
- Studios: The Kennel, Solna, Sweden; Limestone, Stockholm; Artsound, Jakarta, Indonesia; Cabbyland, Jakarta; Brotherland, Jakarta; Aru, Bandung, Indonesia
- Genres: Pop; R&B
- Length: 37:22
- Label: Sony Music Indonesia
- Producers: Cage & Oneye; Caesar & Loui; Ollipop; Harry Mikael Sommerdahl; Marco Steffiano; Isyana Sarasvati

Isyana Sarasvati chronology
Explore! (2015)	Paradox (2017)	Lexicon (2019)

Singles from Paradox
- 1. "Anganku Anganmu" Released: March 30, 2017; 2. "Sekali Lagi" Released: May 1, 2017; 3. "Terpesona" Released: September 1, 2017; 4. "Lembaran Buku" Released: December 8, 2017; 5. "Winter Song" Released: May 15, 2018

Paradox is the second studio album by Isyana Sarasvati. Released on September 1, 2017, the main songs are "Anganku Anganmu", "Sekali Lagi" and "Terpesona". This album is only sold in all KFC outlets in Indonesia.

== Theme and background ==
Unlike the first album Explore!, the contents of the lyrics are fictional stories and based stories on friends, while on Paradox almost all of the lyrics are related to her personal stories. Most of the song themes of the song and the lyrics strongly represent her feelings and personality.

All songs in Paradox were originally written by Isyana Sarasvati who recognized this album as the album that best reflects her personal life. With the help of several Swedish producers, Isyana also had the chance to write and record her songs in Sweden since February 2017.

The theme of this album, namely "The Voice of Paradox" is seen in lyrics, rhythm, and paradoxical tones. Isyana interprets the paradox like human life today, where life has complicated elements, globally and locally, socially and personally. We cannot really understand what really happened. Isyana explained, she read a paradoxical life with a paradoxical personality. Introversion as well as extroversion, pop and classical, in mixed English in English that produce works that build a balance of various contradictions. Through the lyrics, this album tells a lot about emotions that represent Isyana's personal experiences and characters while she continues to answer the tastes of music lovers from various genres.

== Track listing ==
No.	Title	Writer(s)	Producer	Length
1.	"Echo"	Isyana Sarasvati; Karl-Oskar Julius Gummesson; Nils Pontus Petersson	Cage	3:27
2.	"Terpesona" (feat Gamalièl)	Sarasvati; Daniel Caesar; Ludwig Lindell	Caesar & Loui	3:18
3.	"Nada Cinta"	Sarasvati; Olof "Ollipop" Lindskog	Ollipop	3:44
4.	"Lembaran Buku"	Sarasvati; Hayley Michelle Aitken; Lindskog	Ollipop	4:26
5.	"Mad"	Sarasvati; Harry Mikael Sommerdahl	Sommerdahl	3:38
6.	"Anganku Anganmu" (with Raisa)	Sarasvati; Raisa Andriana	Ollipop; Marco Steffiano ^{[a]}	4:30
7.	"Winter Song"	Sarasvati; Caesar; Lindell	Caesar & Loui	3:21
8.	"That's It, I'm Done"	Sarasvati; Gummesson; Petersson	Oneye	3:03
9.	"Sekali Lagi" (from Critical Eleven)	Sarasvati	Sarasvati	4:37
10.	"Gelora"	Sarasvati; Sommerdahl	Sommerdahl	3:18
Total length:				37:22

Notes

- ^{^a} sign as co-producer.

== Awards ==
=== Anugerah Musik Indonesia ===
Year	Category	Detail	Result	Ref.
2017	Best Soul/R&B/Urban Group/Collaboration	"Anganku Anganmu" (featuring Raisa)	Won	
2017	Best Collaboration Production Work	"Anganku Anganmu" (featuring Raisa)	Won	
2017	Best Original Soundtrack Production	"Sekali Lagi" (Original soundtrack: Critical Eleven)	Nominated	
2017	Best of the best production work	"Anganku Anganmu" (featuring Raisa)	Nominated	
2018	Best of Male/Female Solo R&B	"Winter Song"	Won	
2018	Best of Collaboration/Group Soul/R&B/Urban	"Terpesona" (featuring Gamaliel Tapiheru)	Nominated	
2018	Best Urban Production Work	"Heaven" ft Afgan & Rendy Pandugo (EP Album)	Won	
2018	Best Collaboration Production Work	"Heaven" ft Afgan & Rendy Pandugo (EP Album)	Nominated	
2019	Best Urban Solo Artist	"Stargazing" for Milly & Mamet	Nominated	
2019	Best Urban Production Work	"Feel So Right" ft Afgan & Rendy Pandugo (EP Album)	Nominated	
2019	Best Re-Aransement Production Work	"Lagu Cinta" ft Afgan & Rendy Pandugo (EP Album)	Nominated	

=== Anugerah Planet Muzik ===
Year	Category	Detail	Result	Ref.
2017	Best Duo/Group 2017	"Anganku Anganmu" (featuring Raisa)	Nominated	
2017	Best Song (Indonesia) 2017	"Anganku Anganmu" (featuring Raisa)	Won	
2018	Best Female Artist	"Lembaran Buku"	Won	
2018	Most Popular APM	"Lembaran Buku"	Nominated	
2018	Most Popular Artist	Herself	Nominated	
2018	Social Media Icon	Herself	Nominated	
2018	Best Song (Indonesia)	"Lembaran Buku"	Nominated	

=== Cornetto Pop Awards ===
Year	Category	Detail	Result	Ref.
2017	Favorite Pop Song Collaboration	"Anganku Anganmu" (featuring Raisa)	Won	
2017	Favorite Female Singer	Herself	Nominated	

=== Dahsyatnya Awards ===
Year	Category	Detail	Result	Ref.
2018	Outstanding Duo/Collaboration	Raisa & Isyana - "Anganku Anganmu"	Won	
2018	Outstanding Female Singer	Herself	Nominated	
2018	Outstanding Song	Raisa & Isyana - "Anganku Anganmu"	Nominated	
2019	Outstanding Female Singer	Herself	Nominated	

=== Indonesian Choice Awards ===
Year	Category	Detail	Result	Ref.
2018	Female Artist of the Year	Isyana Sarasvati	Nominated	
2018	Album of the Year	Paradox	Nominated	
2018	Song of the Year	"Anganku Anganmu" (featuring Raisa)	Nominated	

=== Indonesian Film Festival ===
Year	Category	Detail	Result	Ref.
2017	Best Theme Song	"Sekali Lagi" from Critical Eleven	Nominated	
2019	Best Theme Song	"Luruh" for Milly & Mamet	Nominated	

=== JawaPos.com Readers Choice Awards ===
Year	Category	Detail	Result	Ref.
2017	Favorite Female Singer	Herself	Won	

=== LINE Indonesia Awards ===
Year	Category	Detail	Result	Ref.
2019	Favorit Female Singer	Herself	Nominated	
2019	Favorite Duo/Group	Trio AIR (Afgan, Isyana Sarasvati, Rendy Pandugo)	Nominated	

=== Maya Awards ===
Year	Category	Detail	Result	Ref.
2017	Best Theme Song	"Sekali Lagi" (OST. Critical Eleven)	Nominated	
2019	Best Theme Song	"Winter Song"	Won	

=== Mnet Asian Music Awards ===
Year	Category	Detail	Result	Ref.
2017	Best Composer of the Year	"Anganku Anganmu" (featuring Raisa)	Won	

=== MTV Europe Music Awards ===
Year	Category	Detail	Result	Ref.
2017	Best SouthEast Asia Act (Indonesia)	Herself	Nominated	

=== OZ Radio Bandung FM Awards ===
Year	Category	Detail	Result	Ref.
2018	Most Friendly Female Singee	Herself	Pending	
2018	Most Friendly Musician	Herself	Pending	
2018	Most Friendly Collaboration	"Anganku Anganmu" ft Raisa	Pending	
2018	Most Friendly Song	"Anganku Anganmu" ft Raisa	Pending	
2018	Most Friendly Soundtrack	"Sekali Lagi" from Critical Eleven	Pending	
2018	Most Friendly Fanbase	Isyanation	Pending	

=== SCTV Music Awards ===
Year	Category	Detail	Result	Ref.
2017	Most Famous Collaboration	"Anganku Anganmu" – Raisa featuring Isyana Sarasvati	Won	
2017	Most Famous Video Clip	"Anganku Anganmu" – Raisa featuring Isyana Sarasvati	Nominated	
2017	Most Famous Female Singer	Herself	Nominated	
2018	Most Famous Collaboration	"Heaven" ft Afgan & Rendy Pandugo (EP Album)	Won	
2018	Most Famous Female Singer	Herself	Nominated	
2019	Most Famous Video Clip	"Winter Song"	Nominated	
2019	Most Famous Female Singer	Herself	Nominated	
2019	Most Famous Collaboration	"Feel So Right" ft Afgan & Rendy Pandugo (EP Album)	Nominated	

=== Other Awards ===
Year	Awards	Category	Detail	Result	Ref.
2017	Social Media Awards	Prominent Figure: With Centimen Positive in Social Media	Herself	Recipient	
2018	Lux Sound of Women	Inspiring Women	Herself	Recipient	
2019	Indonesian Box Office Movie Awards	Best Original Soundtrack	"Luruh" for Milly & Mamet	Won	
