= Backstage (2021 film) =

2021 musical drama film

- Theatrical release poster
- Directed by: Guntur Soeharjanto
- Screenplay by: Vera Varidia; Robert Ronny; Monty Tiwa; Titien Wattimena
- Story by: Robert Ronny
- Produced by: Robert Ronny
- Starring: Vanesha Prescilla; Sissy Priscillia
- Cinematography: Hani Pradigya
- Edited by: Wawan I. Wibowo
- Music by: Andi Rianto
- Production companies: Paragon Pictures; Ideosource Entertainment; Astro Shaw; Endeavor Content; NFC Indonesia
- Release dates: 29 November 2021 (Yogyakarta); 30 December 2021 (Indonesia)
- Running time: 115 minutes
- Countries: Indonesia; Malaysia
- Language: Indonesian

Backstage is a 2021 musical drama film directed by Guntur Soeharjanto, from a screenplay written by Vera Varidia, Robert Ronny, Monty Tiwa, and Titien Wattimena. It stars real-life sisters Vanesha Prescilla and Sissy Priscillia.

It had its world premiere at the 16th Jogja-NETPAC Asian Film Festival on 29 November 2021, and was released theatrically in Indonesia on 30 December 2021. This film received Citra Award and Maya Award for Best Theme Song for "Melangkah".

== Premise ==
Elsa, who dreams of becoming a popular star, lipsyncs to the voice of her older sister, Sandra. Elsa achieves overnight fame and meets her idol, Michael Nara. They fall in love, and Sandra begins to feel like she is losing her sister.

== Cast ==
- Vanesha Prescilla as Elsa
- Sissy Priscillia as Sandra
- Karina Suwandi as Andini, Elsa and Sandra's mother
- Achmad Megantara as Michael Nara

== Production ==
The idea for Backstage was conceived by producer Robert Ronny in 2016 when he heard Sissy Priscillia singing on a trip to Fukuoka, Japan, where they were attending the Fukuoka International Film Festival with the cast of Ada Apa Dengan Cinta? 2. Principal photography wrapped in August 2020, after being postponed in March 2020 due to the COVID-19 pandemic.

== Release ==
Backstage was projected to release in June 2020, but postponed due to the COVID-19 pandemic. The film had its world premiere at the 16th Jogja-NETPAC Asian Film Festival on 29 November 2021 during the Indonesian Film Showcase section. The film was theatrically released in Indonesia on 30 December 2021. It garnered 138,258 admissions during its theatrical run. It was released in Malaysian theatres on 20 January 2022.

Amazon Prime Video acquired its distribution rights, releasing it on 1 August 2022.

== Accolades ==
Award / Film Festival	Date of ceremony	Category	Recipient(s)	Result	Ref.
Maya Awards	24–26 March 2022	Best Feature Film	Robert Ronny	Nominated	
Maya Awards	24–26 March 2022	Best Director	Guntur Soeharjanto	Nominated	
Maya Awards	24–26 March 2022	Best Actress in a Leading Role	Sissy Priscillia	Nominated	
Maya Awards	24–26 March 2022	Best Original Screenplay	Vera Varidia, Robert Ronny, Monty Tiwa, and Titien Wattimena	Nominated	
Maya Awards	24–26 March 2022	Best Cinematography	Hani Pradigya	Nominated	
Maya Awards	24–26 March 2022	Best Art Direction	Fauzi	Nominated	
Maya Awards	24–26 March 2022	Best Editing	Wawan I. Wibowo	Nominated	
Maya Awards	24–26 March 2022	Best Visual Effects	Orangeroom CS	Nominated	
Maya Awards	24–26 March 2022	Best Sound	Mohamad Ikhsan and Lexy F. Komansilan	Nominated	
Maya Awards	24–26 March 2022	Best Score	Andi Rianto	Nominated	
Maya Awards	24–26 March 2022	Best Theme Song	Andi Rianto and Monty Tiwa for "Melangkah"	Won	
Indonesian Film Festival	22 November 2022	Best Theme Song	Andi Rianto and Monty Tiwa for "Melangkah"	Won	
