= Yuni (film) =

2021 drama film

- Film poster
- Directed by: Kamila Andini
- Written by: Kamila Andini; Prima Rusdi
- Produced by: Ifa Isfansyah; Fran Borgia; Birgit Kemner
- Starring: Arawinda Kirana
- Cinematography: Teoh Gay Hian
- Edited by: Lee Chatametikool
- Music by: Alexis Rault
- Production companies: Fourcolours Films; Akanga Film Asia; Manny Films
- Release dates: September 12, 2021 (TIFF); December 9, 2021 (Indonesia)
- Running time: 95 minutes
- Countries: Indonesia; Singapore; France; Australia
- Languages: Indonesian; Serang-Javanese
- Budget: €500,000

Yuni is a 2021 internationally co-produced drama film written and directed by Kamila Andini. Produced by Fourcolours Films, Starvision, Akanga Film Asia and Manny Films, it stars Arawinda Kirana in the title role.

The film had its world premiere at the 2021 Toronto International Film Festival in September 2021, where it was named the winner of the Platform Prize competition. It was selected as the Indonesian entry for the Best International Feature Film at the 94th Academy Awards.

== Plot ==
Yuni, a bright high school student, wants to attend university. She gains notoriety as she rejects a proposal by a man she barely knows. She rejects a second proposal, triggering concern relating to the local belief that if two proposals are rejected, a person will never marry. She finds her love for poetry as an escape from the reality. Until one day, her literature teacher comes to her house and becomes the third man to propose to her.

== Cast ==
- Arawinda Kirana as Yuni
- Kevin Ardilova as Yoga
- Dimas Aditya as Pak Damar
- Neneng Risma as Sarah
- Vania Aurell as Nisa
- Anne Yasmine as Tika
- Marissa Anita as Bu Lies
- Asmara Abigail as Suci Cute
- Sekar Sari
- Rukman Rosadi as Bapak
- Muhammad Khan as Iman

== Production ==
Director Kamila Andini, along with producer Ifa Isfansyah and co-writer Prima Rusdi, had started working on Yuni in 2017. The project had been selected by TorinoFilmLab for the 2018 Torino FeatureLab.

== Release ==
Yuni had its world premiere at the 2021 Toronto International Film Festival in September 2021. By the end of its run, the film will have screened at film festivals in Busan, Vancouver, Rome, Brisbane, Philadelphia and Tokyo. It was released theatrically in Indonesia on 9 December 2021. Disney+ Hotstar and Netflix acquired the film's distribution rights, releasing it on 21 April 2022 and 24 September 2026, respectively.

== Accolades ==
Award	Date	Category	Recipient	Result	Ref.
Toronto International Film Festival	9–18 September 2021	Platform Prize	Kamila Andini	Won	
Indonesian Film Festival	10 November 2021	Best Picture	Ifa Isfansyah and Chand Parwez Servia	Nominated	
Indonesian Film Festival	10 November 2021	Best Director	Kamila Andini	Nominated	
Indonesian Film Festival	10 November 2021	Best Actress	Arawinda Kirana	Won	
Indonesian Film Festival	10 November 2021	Best Supporting Actor	Dimas Aditya	Nominated	
Indonesian Film Festival	10 November 2021	Best Supporting Actress	Asmara Abigail	Nominated	
Indonesian Film Festival	10 November 2021	Best Original Screenplay	Kamila Andini and Prima Rusdi	Nominated	
Indonesian Film Festival	10 November 2021	Best Film Editing	Cesa David Luckmansyah	Nominated	
Indonesian Film Festival	10 November 2021	Best Visual Effects	Nara Dipa	Nominated	
Indonesian Film Festival	10 November 2021	Best Sound	Sutrisno and Wahyu Tri Purnomo	Nominated	
Indonesian Film Festival	10 November 2021	Best Original Score	Mar Galo and Ken Jenie	Nominated	
Indonesian Film Festival	10 November 2021	Best Original Song	Umar Muslim for sound poetry of "Hujan Bulan Juni" by Sapardi Djoko Damono	Nominated	
Indonesian Film Festival	10 November 2021	Best Art Direction	Budi Riyanto Karung	Nominated	
Indonesian Film Festival	10 November 2021	Best Costume Design	Hagai Pakan	Nominated	
Indonesian Film Festival	10 November 2021	Best Make Up and Hairstyling	Eba Sheba	Nominated	
Film Pilihan Tempo	20 December 2021	Film Pilihan Tempo	Yuni	Nominated	
Film Pilihan Tempo	20 December 2021	Best Director	Kamila Andini	Nominated	
Film Pilihan Tempo	20 December 2021	Best Screenplay	Kamila Andini and Prima Rusdi	Nominated	
Film Pilihan Tempo	20 December 2021	Best Actress	Arawinda Kirana	Won	
Film Pilihan Tempo	20 December 2021	Best Supporting Actor	Kevin Ardilova	Nominated	
Film Pilihan Tempo	20 December 2021	Best Supporting Actress	Asmara Abigail	Nominated	
Film Pilihan Tempo	20 December 2021	Best Supporting Actress	Marissa Anita	Nominated	
Maya Awards	24–26 March 2022	Best Feature Film	Ifa Isfansyah and Chand Parwez Servia	Won	
Maya Awards	24–26 March 2022	Best Director	Kamila Andini	Won	
Maya Awards	24–26 March 2022	Best Actress in a Leading Role	Arawinda Kirana	Won	
Maya Awards	24–26 March 2022	Best Actor in a Supporting Role	Dimas Aditya	Nominated	
Maya Awards	24–26 March 2022	Best Actor in a Supporting Role	Kevin Ardilova	Nominated	
Maya Awards	24–26 March 2022	Best Actress in a Supporting Role	Asmara Abigail	Nominated	
Maya Awards	24–26 March 2022	Best Short Appearance	Rukman Rosadi	Nominated	
Maya Awards	24–26 March 2022	Best Original Screenplay	Kamila Andini and Prima Rusdi	Won	
Maya Awards	24–26 March 2022	Best Cinematography	Teoh Gay Hian	Won	
Maya Awards	24–26 March 2022	Best Editing	Lee Chatametikool and Cesa David Luckmansyah	Won	
Maya Awards	24–26 March 2022	Best Sound Design	Lim Ting Li, Wahyu Tri Purnomo, Mohamad Ikhsan, Sutrisno and Nanda Purwadi Sunardi	Nominated	
Maya Awards	24–26 March 2022	Best Poster Design	Alvin Hariz	Won	
Maya Awards	24–26 March 2022	Best Film Score	Ken Jenie, Mar Galo and Alexis Rault	Nominated	
Maya Awards	24–26 March 2022	Best Costume Design	Hagai Pakan	Nominated	
Maya Awards	24–26 March 2022	Best Makeup	Eba Sheba	Nominated	
Maya Awards	24–26 March 2022	Best Art Direction	Budi Riyanto Karung	Nominated	

== See also ==
- List of submissions to the 94th Academy Awards for Best International Feature Film
- List of Indonesian submissions for the Academy Award for Best International Feature Film
