= Il Sogno (song) =

Single by Isyana Sarasvati
- Language: English; Italian
- Released: March 6, 2021
- Genre: Progressive metal; death metal
- Length: 3:34
- Label: Redrose
- Songwriter: Isyana Sarasvati
- Producer: Kenan Loui

Isyana Sarasvati singles chronology
"1+1" (2021)	"Il Sogno" (2021)	"Yth: Naif" (2021)

Music video
- "Il Sogno" on YouTube

"Il Sogno" (stylized as "IL SOGNO"; Italian for "The Dream") is a song by Indonesian singer Isyana Sarasvati. It was released under her own record label Redrose Records as a single on 6 March 2021. Written by Isyana herself, the song describes her dreams and her attempt to understand them. The recording was produced by Kenan Loui and combines progressive rock and classical music elements just like Sarasvati's songs since her third album Lexicon (2019).

== Writing and lyrics ==
"Il Sogno" was written by Sarasvati and the song describes her dreams and her attempts to understand them. Isyana said that she is interested in dreams, so she wanted to write a song about her experiences and questions on her dreams.

The title of "Il Sogno" is Italian for "dream" while its lyrics is mostly written in English, with several parts that are in Italian. Isyana said that she included Italian elements in this song because she remembered how she used to sing opera during her college days.

== Music ==
The recording for "Il Sogno" was produced by Kenan Loui, who previously produced several Isyana's songs, namely "Ragu Semesta", "Pendekar Cahaya", "Lexicon", and "Unlock the Key". Like her songs since her third album Lexicon (2019), "Il Sogno" combines elements from rock and classical music. The song features opera seria vocals from Isyana and progressive rock instruments.

== Music video ==
"Il Sogno" music video was released on 7 April 2021. It visualizes Isyana's dreams that are mentioned on the lyrics; CNN Indonesia points out how Himalaya Mountains appears during the line "climbing to the top of Himalaya" and the camera movement through a cloudy sky towards the Moon during the line "blinded by a mist under the moonlight". They also describes how the scene during the transition from opera to rock music "moves following the beat of the piano, drum and guitar instruments." The animation for the video was done by Motionbeast studio.

For their work on this music video, Motionbeast was nominated for Best Music Video in 24th Anugerah Musik Indonesia. At the 2021 Maya Awards, "Il Sogno" won an award for Best Music Video.

== Collaboration with Deadsquad ==
On 23 March 2021, Sarasvati announced in her Instagram account that she will be collaborating with Indonesian death metal band Deadsquad on "Il Sogno". This collaboration was first performed live on I Don't Give a Fest concert on 10 April 2021. In this performance, the song was accompanied by screaming from Deadsquad then-vocalist, Daniel Mardhany.

"Il Sogno" was further rearranged until it was released as a new single on 27 December 2021. In the single version, the guttural growls are done by Agustinus Widi, who had replaced Mardhany as Deadsquad's vocalist at that point, and it has tremolo riffs arranged by Sarasvati and Deadsquad guitarist Stevie Item. The music video for the new single was released on Sarasvati's YouTube channel on 27 January 2022. In 25th Anugerah Musik Indonesia, this metal arrangement won Best Metal Solo Artist/Group/Collaboration category.
