= Bhumiband =

Singaporean Malay band

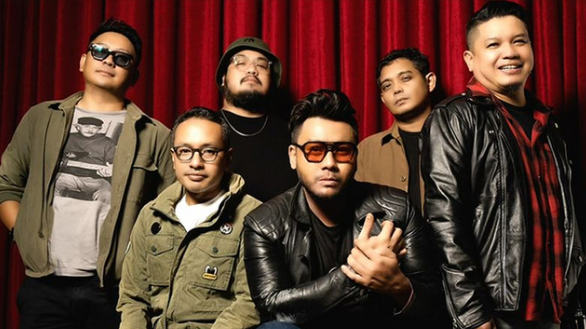
- Left to right: Kif, Hang Dimas, Eddy, Zuher, and Nazri

Background information
- Origin: Singapore
- Genre: Pop rock
- Years active: 2003-2006, 2016-present
- Label: Monstania Musicworks
- Members: Kif; Zuher; Nazri; Awi Rafael
- Past members: Hang Dimas; Eddy; Athif; Reamie; Irfan; Atiqah; Ard
- Website: www.instagram.com/bhumiband/

Bhumiband is an independent Singaporean Malay band. Formed in 2003, the band consists of lead singers Ard and Awi Rafael, pianist and keyboardist Hang Dimas, drummer Zuher, lead guitarist Athif, bassist Kif, and percussionist Eddy. The band's lineup has remained static during its history, with the only exceptions of the departure of guitarist and co-songwriter Nazri, Ard and Kif in 2005. Hang Dimas would later join the band Hujan in 2008. Awi Rafael also has a successful solo career after Bhumiband. Irfan and Reamie both become official members in 2016.

== History ==
In 2005, Bhumiband achieved regional recognition with their first album Suara Dunia. The album was nominated for 5 awards, including 2 regional categories in the 2005 Anugerah Planet Muzik (APM), which is the local Malay music industry's awards show. It also featured a Batucada track from Wicked Aura Singapore. The band's second album, Konspirasi Dunia was equally if not more successful in 2006. The song "Goda" from the album was featured in the original soundtrack of Malaysian action film, Remp-It.

After touring together with Indonesian band Sheila on 7 and recording non-stop in the late 2006, the band went on hiatus following individual commitment and projects.

=== Return ===
In late 2016, the band returned with the single "Hanya Kamu". Bhumiband has been known to use pop and rock in their style of music which was predominant in their 2005 and 2006 albums but "Hanya Kamu" displayed the band's progression and evolution with a wider arrangement akin to its current form. "Hanya Kamu" was nominated in the "Popular Song (Singapore)" category and the band was also nominated in the "Popular Artist (Singapore)" category at the annual Anugerah Planet Muzik 2018.

The band released their 2nd single in January 2018 titled "Gerbang Asmara Hakiki". The single debuts the band's first collaboration with local writer and prolific wordsmith, Mohd Khair Mohd Yasin.

In 2019, Bhumiband collaborated with Indah Han and produced her 1st Malay single "Kehadiranmu" (composed by Kief). The band then followed up with a duet with Indah in 2020 on the song "Ku Ingin Tahu" which was originally composed by Atiqah. Just before the Covid lockdown, Bhumiband managed to complete a recording session with Juwiezy and produced "Segalanya Kerana" (composed by Reamie).

During the pandemic, Bhumiband worked on their 3rd Album "The Bhumi Projek" and released "Kau di Hatiku" as the first single from the album. The song featured Indonesian singers "Zara & Doddy" and managed to climb Singapore's Malay local radio charts "Ria897 Carta Singa Maksima".

The band is planning to collaborate with more local and regional vocalists. They have released "Oh Kekasih" (single) featuring local ballad singer "Zaibaktian" on the last day of 2021 and "Imaginasi Ku" featuring Malaysian singer/songwriter "Airinna Namara" on 31 March 2022. "Imaginasi Ku" also managed to get into "Ria897 Carta Singa Maksima" 2 months after it was released. The band released "Adinda" on 5 August 2022 and will be releasing "Biru Lagi" on 25 November 2022. The band work with one of the most well known producer, Ashidy Ridwan for "Biru Lagi" which feature vocals from Indah, Flique and Zaibaktian.

To date, Bhumiband has released 3 studio albums, 10 singles and currently working on the next project with Awi Rafael. After 20 years, the band got back into the studios with Awi and recorded a few Malay and English songs. The first song, "Euforia" was released as a single in October 2023 with the latest single "Into the Fire" recently released in July 2024. "Into the Fire" is the band's first ever English song. It was featured in Spotify's regional editorial playlists (Singapore, Indonesia, Malaysia, Thailand, Philippines).

Having sold several thousand records across Singapore, Malaysia, and Indonesia, Bhumiband is recognized as a notable Singaporean Malay band.

== Members ==
=== Current members ===
- Nazri - Guitarist
- Kif - Bassist
- Zuher - Drummer
- Awi Rafael - Vocalist

=== Former Members ===
- Ard - Vocalist
- Hang Dimas - Keyboards
- Athif - Guitarist
- Eddy - Percussionist / Bassist
- Irfan - Guitarist
- Reamie - Guitarist
- Atiqah - Keyboards

== Accolades ==
Anugerah Planet Muzik 2005

- Best Local Song - "Oh Kasih"
- Best Local Album - Suara Dunia
- Best New Group/Duo - Bhumiband

Anugerah Planet Muzik 2007

- Best Song (Singapore) - "Goda"
- Best Album (Singapore) - Konspirasi Dunia
- Best Artist (Singapore) - Bhumiband

Anugerah Planet Muzik 2018

- Nominated for Popular Artist (Singapore) - Bhumiband
- Nominated for Popular Song (Singapore) - "Hanya Kamu"

Ria897 Carta Singa Maksima

- "Imaginasi Ku" - Reached No.3 (25 Jun 2022)
- "Kau di Hatiku" - Reached No.1 (29 Jan 2022) for 2 weeks
- "Hanya Kamu" - Reached No.1 (21 Oct 2017) for 3 weeks

== Discography ==
Year	Title	Release	Label
2005	Suara Dunia	Album	Rumah Production
2006	Konspirasi Dunia	Album	Excellent Tunes
2016	Hanya Kamu	Single	Monstania Musicworks
2018	Gerbang Asmara Hakiki	Single	Monstania Musicworks
2018	Raya Istimewa	Single	oQey Studios
2019	Seadanya	Single	oQey Studios
2019	Suasana di Aidilfitri feat. DClassique	Single	Snoots Music Group
2020	Ku Ingin Tahu feat. Indah Han	Single	oQey Studios
2021	Inilah Dunia (The Bhumi Projek)	Album	oQey Studios
2021	Kau di Hatiku feat. Zara and Dody	Single	oQey Studios
2021	Oh Kekasih feat. Zaibaktian	Single	oQey Studios
2022	Imaginasi Ku feat. Airinna Namara	Single	oQey Studios
2022	Adinda	Single	oQey Studios
2022	Biru Lagi feat. Flique, Indah, Zaibaktian	Single	NuKingdom
2023	Euforia feat. Awi Rafael	Single	Newsantara Asia
2024	Into the Fire feat. Awi Rafael	Single	Newsantara Asia
2025	NVRLETUGO feat. Awi Rafael	Single	Newsantara Asia
2026	Politik Cinta feat. Awi Rafael	Single	Newsantara Asia

=== BhumiProjek ===
Year	Title	Release	Label
2024	Masih Menunggu	Single	oQey Studios
2024	Yang Terakhir	Single	oQey Studios
2025	Cukup Sudah	Single	AnakBhumi
2025	Adik ku yang Ayu	Single	oQey Studios
2026	Move On	Single	oQey Studios
