= Aum! =

- Release poster
- Directed by: Bambang "Ipoenk" Kuntara Mukti
- Screenplay by: Bambang "Ipoenk" Kuntara Mukti; Gin Teguh
- Produced by: Damar Ardi; Suryo Wiyogo
- Starring: Jefri Nichol; Chicco Jerikho; Aksara Dena; Agnes Natasya Tije
- Cinematography: Fauzi "Ujel" Bausad
- Edited by: Fajar K Effendy
- Music by: Bigheldy
- Production company: Lajar Tantjap Film
- Distributed by: Bioskop Online
- Release date: 30 September 2021
- Running time: 85 minutes
- Country: Indonesia
- Language: Indonesian

Aum! is a 2021 Indonesian adventure mockumentary film, directed and co-written by Bambang "Ipoenk" Kuntara Mukti in his directorial debut. The film tells a fiction story around the fall of Suharto in 1998.

== Premise ==
Aum! tells about two activists, Satriya and Adam, who fight together with fellow activists to voice the marginalized community whom oppressed by the national government prior to the Reformation in 1998.

== Cast ==
- Jefri Nichol as Satriya / Surya Jatitama
- Chicco Jerikho as Panca Kusuma Negara
- Aksara Dena as Adam / Bram Sanjaya
- Agnes Natasya Tjie as Linda Salim
- Mr. Richard as Paul Whiteberg
- Dhisga Amandatya as Dodi
- Seteng Sadja as Sardi Hartanto / Ardiman Wicaksono
- Kukuh Riyadi as Anwar
- Muhammad Ibnu Shohib as Malik
- Aryudha Fasha as Soni
- Djohan Ekspresi as Johan

== Production ==
The filming took place in Yogyakarta during the COVID-19 pandemic and followed local COVID-19 safety protocols.

Nichol's portrayal of Satriya and Surya Jatitama is inspired by Budiman Sudjatmiko, a Reformation activist.

== Release ==
Aum! was first announced during the launching of mobile application of the video on demand service Bioskop Online, deemed as its original film, on 1 April 2021. The film was released on 30 September 2021. On its release date, the film and its hashtag "#MengAumHariIni" (lit: Roaring today) trended on Twitter.
