= Isyana Sarasvati =

Indonesian singer-songwriter

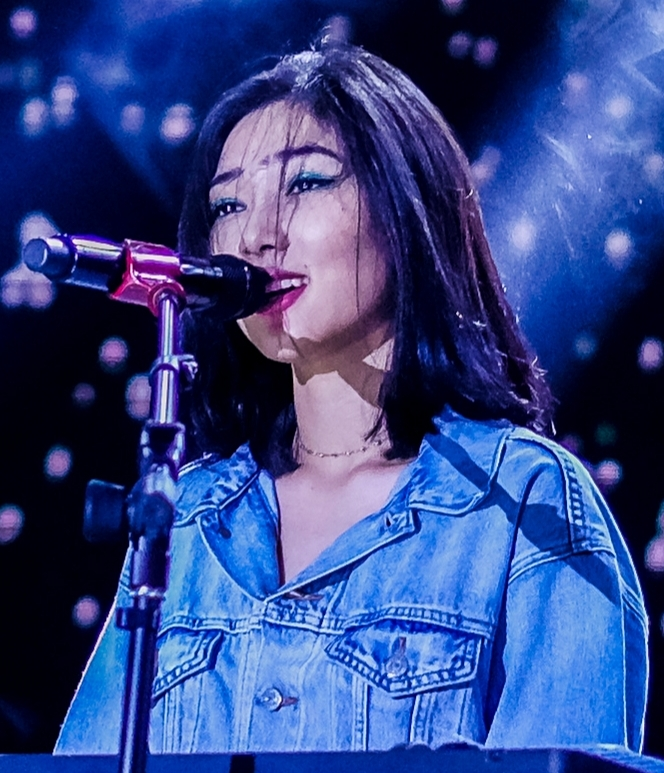
- Isyana Sarasvati at Magnofestwo 2020
- Born: 2 May 1993 (age 33); Bandung, West Java, Indonesia
- Education: Royal College of Music Nanyang Academy of Fine Arts
- Occupations: Musician; Singer; Songwriter; Pianist; Record producer; Actress
- Spouse: dr. Rayhan Maditra Indrayanto (m. 2020)
- Relatives: Rara Sekar Larasati (sister)
- Awards: 30 Under 30 Forbes Asia, 2020; 30 Under 30 Forbes Indonesia, 2019; 40 under 40 Fortune Indonesia, 2023; Full list
- Musical career
- Genres: R&B; pop; opera; jazz; electro pop; progressive rock; metal
- Instruments: Vocal; Piano; Electone; Flute; Saxophone
- Years active: 2014 - present
- Labels: Sony Music Indonesia (2014–2020); Redrose Records (2020–present)
- Website: isyanasarasvati.com

Isyana Sarasvati (born 2 May 1993) is an Indonesian singer-songwriter and the founder of Redrose Records. She is a graduate of Singapore's Nanyang Academy of Fine Arts and London's Royal College of Music. Known for her original compositions, she wrote all of the songs on her 2015 debut pop album, Explore! and on her four subsequent albums, Paradox (2017), Lexicon (2019), ISYANA (2023) and Eklektiko (2026). She has also performed as an opera singer in Singapore. She is the recipient of numerous Indonesian and international awards.

Before gaining fame as a pop singer and songwriter, she had built a reputation as a classical music soloist and recitalist. Isyana also participated in numerous musical competitions. At age 15, she won a "best composer" award. Her song Wings of Your Shadow was selected as the 12th best composition of 3,500 entries in the International Junior Original Concert (IJOC). As a result, she performed the electone at the IJOC 2008 concert in Bunkamura hall, Tokyo, Japan. Isyana signed a recording deal with Sony Music Indonesia in 2014 and released two singles, Keep Being You (2014) and Tetap Dalam Jiwa (2015). Her albums have received positive reviews and commercial success.

On 2 September 2018, Isyana sang the first song at the closing ceremony of the 18th Asian Games in Jakarta, Indonesia, performing Asia's Who We Are before an audience of more than 55,000 people at Gelora Bung Karno Stadium.

In May 2019, Walt Disney Pictures selected Isyana and Gamaliel Tapiheru to sing A Whole New World on the soundtrack for the Indonesian version of the 2019 remake of Aladdin. They were interviewed in Tokyo by Alan Menken, the man behind many Walt Disney Animation Studios film scores. In July 2019, Isyana joined the coaching panel of Season 4 of The Voice Indonesia with Armand Maulana, Titi DJ, Nino RAN, and Vidi Aldiano. Isyana was also a panelist for Season 4 of The Voice Kids Indonesia.

In 2019, she was listed on Forbes Indonesia's 30 Under 30 list of inspiring young achievers, in the art, style and entertainment category. In April 2020, Forbes Asia included Isyana on its 30 Under 30 list in the Entertainment and Sports, and Celebrity categories.

After six years with Sony Music Indonesia, Isyana on 20 October 2020 announced she had established a music label called REDROSE RECORDS. On 2 February 2021, Isyana and her husband Rayhan released a single titled 1+1 to mark their first wedding anniversary.

On 10 March 2022, Garena Free Fire Indonesia announced an collaboration with Isyana with the concept of The Diva on Battle In Style, the collaboration resulted in a music video with a Free Fire theme song arranged by Isyana. FF Esport ID even collaborated with Isyana's song "IL SOGNO" and a lyric video with the theme of FFIM which was released on the YouTube FF Esport ID channel and became a backsound at the Free Fire Indonesia Masters 2022 Spring competition.

On 2 October 2022, Isyana released her first NFT with the title My Mystery NFT.

== Early life and education ==
Isyana was born in Bandung on 2 May 1993. She spent part of her early childhood outside Indonesia because her parents worked and studied in Belgium. When she was seven, her family moved to Bandung, West Java. Isyana is the youngest daughter of Luana Marpanda, a music teacher, and Sapta Dwikardana, a lecturer and graphologist. She has an older sister, Rara Sekar Larasati, a cultural anthropologist, who also sang in a band called Banda Neira. Raised in a family of educators, Isyana was introduced to music at the age of four by her mother. Isyana plays piano, electone, flute, violin and saxophone.

Isyana's music career in Indonesia began with several covers of popular songs of 2012 and 2013, uploaded on her YouTube and SoundCloud channels. After turning down initial offers of recording contracts because she wanted to focus on her studies, she signed with Sony Music Indonesia in 2014.

At age 16, Isyana received a scholarship from the Singapore Government to study Music Performance at the Nanyang Academy of Fine Arts (NAFA). in 2012, she was an exchange student at Tainan National University of the Arts, Tainan, Taiwan. In 2013, she obtained a Diploma in Music Performance. Isyana was awarded a full scholarship to study further at NAFA in collaboration with the Royal College of Music (RCM) in London, under the Bachelor of Music with Honours Funded Degree Program. In her final year of study, she received the RCM Excellence Award Scholarship (2015). On 26 September 2015, Isyana graduated from NAFA with a Bachelor of Music and received the Best Graduate and Embassy of Peru awards.

=== As soloist and recitalist ===
- Jakarta Concert Orchestra, Gedung Teater Jakarta (2018)
- Vienna at the Turn of 19th Century Concert, Aula Simfonia Jakarta (2017)
- Toyota Classics Concert, Jakarta (2016)
- Gloria Nafa Orchestra & Chorus Gala Concert, Victoria Concert Hall – Singapore (2016)
- Soloist in Vocal Recital "The Rising Star Concert Series", The Resonanz Music Studio, Jakarta (2015)
- Classical Goes To Cinema, Jakarta (2014)
- Juvenum New Year Concert, Jakarta (2014)
- Wonderful Christmas Concert, Aula Simfonia Jakarta – Indosiar (2013)
- Soloist in Dinner en Blanc Event, Singapore (2013)
- Soprano Solo LOVE, NAFA Consert Series (2013)
- Soloist Vocal The High Scorers Concert Diploma Nanyang Academy of Fine Arts (NAFA)
- Soloist Guest as the 1st Winner Competition in Final 7th Tan Ngiang Kaw/Tan Ngiang Ann Vocal Competition, Singapore (2013)
- Soloist, in Remembering Zubir Said's legacy (Singapore)
- Soloist Soprano (R. Strauss, Four Last Songs) with NAFA Orchestra, NAFA Concert Series (2012)
- Soloist in Concert The Resonanz Music Studio, Jakarta (2012)
- National High Achievers’ ABRSM Concert 2007, Indonesia (2007)
- National High Achievers’ ABRSM, Indonesia (2004).

=== Operatic performances ===
- Opera "La Princesse Jaune" in Singapore, as Lena (2014)
- Grand Premiere of "Clara" with Ananda Sukarlan & Orchestra in Indonesia, as Clara (2014)
- Opera Comique "At The Airport" with New Opera Singapore, as Air Stewardess (2013)
- Singing Duet, Love Philosophy NAFA Concert Series, Singapore (2013)
- Soloist in Opera Comique 2, In The Class Room with New Opera Singapore (2012)
- NAFA Opera Scene, Singapore, as Rosina & Papagena (2012)
- NAFA Opera Scene Commedia Lirica, Singapore, as Nanneta (2011)

== Personal life ==
Isyana met dr. Rayhan Maditra Indrayanto in junior high school. They began dating in 2007. After being in a relationship for 12 years, they became engaged on 29 December 2019 and were married on 2 February 2020 in Bandung.

== Discography ==
=== Studio albums ===
Title	Album details
Explore!	Released: 25 November 2015; Special Edition (Deluxe) Released: 21 October 2016; Label: Sony Music Indonesia; Format: CD, digital download
Paradox	Released: 1 September 2017; Label: Sony Music Indonesia; Format: CD, digital download
LEXICON	Released: 29 November 2019; Label: Sony Music Indonesia; Format: Box Set, digital download
ISYANA	Released: 26 May 2023; Label: Redrose Records; Format: Box Set, digital download
Eklektiko	Released: 21 May 2026; Label: Redrose Records; Format: CD, digital download

=== Compilation albums ===
Title	Album details
Energy of Asia: Official Album of Asian Games 2018	Released: 13 July 2018; Label: Jagonya Musik & Sport Indonesia, ASIRI & INASGOC; Fomat: CD, digital download

=== Soundtrack albums ===
Title	Album details
Milly & Mamet (Original Motion Picture Soundtrack)	Released: 15 December 2018; Label: Sony Music Indonesia; Format: digital download
Petualangan Sherina 2 (Original Motion Picture Soundtrack)	Released: 21 September 2023; Label: Trinity Optima Production; Format: digital download

=== Extended plays ===
Title	EP details
AIR (with Afgan and Rendy Pandugo)	Released: 26 April 2019; Label: Sony Music Indonesia, Trinity Optima Production; Format: Digital download
My Mystery	Released: 17 June 2022; Label: Redrose Records; Format: Vinyl, digital download

=== Singles ===
Title	Year	Peak chart positions	Album	Label
Title	Year	IDN	Album	Label
"Paseban Cafe"	2014	—	Fariz RM & Dian PP in Collaboration With	Target Pop
"Keep Being You"	2014	—	Explore!	Sony Music Indonesia
"Tetap Dalam Jiwa"	2015	—	OST Tiger Boy & Explore!	Sony Music Indonesia
"Kau Adalah" (featuring Rayi Putra of RAN)	2015	—	Explore!	Sony Music Indonesia
"Mimpi"	2016	—	Explore!	Sony Music Indonesia
"Tanah Airku"	2016	—	OST My Trip My Adventure: The Lost Paradise	Sony Music Indonesia
"Pesta"	2017	—	Explore!	Sony Music Indonesia
"The Way I Love You"	2017	—	Explore!	Sony Music Indonesia
"Anganku Anganmu" (with Raisa)	2017	—	Paradox	Sony Music Indonesia, Juni Records
"Sekali Lagi"	2017	—	OST Critical Eleven & Paradox	Sony Music Indonesia
"Terpesona" (featuring Gamaliel Tapiheru of GAC)	2017	—	Paradox	Sony Music Indonesia
"Masih Berharap"	2017	—	OST Ayat-Ayat Cinta 2	MD Music Indonesia
"Lembaran Buku"	2018	—	Paradox	Sony Music Indonesia
"Heaven" (with Afgan and Rendy Pandugo)	2018	—	AIR (EP)	Sony Music Indonesia, Trinity Optima Production
"Winter Song"	2018	—	Paradox	Sony Music Indonesia
"Asia's Who We Are"	2018	—	Asian Games 2018: Energy of Asia	
"Luruh" (with Rara Sekar Larasati)	2018	—	Milly & Mamet (Original Motion Picture Soundtrack)	Sony Music Indonesia
"Feel So Right" (with Afgan and Rendy Pandugo)	2019	—	AIR (EP)	Sony Music Indonesia, Trinity Optima Production
"Never Let Go" (with Afgan and Rendy Pandugo)	2019	—	AIR (EP)	Sony Music Indonesia, Trinity Optima Production
"Lagu Cinta" (with Afgan and Rendy Pandugo)	2019	45	AIR (EP)	Sony Music Indonesia, Trinity Optima Production
"A Whole New World" (featuring Gamaliel Tapiheru of GAC)	2019	—	OST Aladdin (Indonesia Version)	Walt Disney Records
"untuk hati yang terluka."	2019	27	OST Nanti Kita Cerita tentang Hari Ini & LEXICON	Sony Music Indonesia
"ragu Semesta"	2019	66	LEXICON	Sony Music Indonesia
"Sikap Duniawi"	2019	36	LEXICON	Sony Music Indonesia
"Lagu Malam Hari"	2020	—	LEXICON	Sony Music Indonesia
"UNLOCK THE KEY"	2020	—	Single non-album	REDROSE RECORDS
"1+1" (with Rayhan Maditra Indrayanto)	2021	—	Single non-album	REDROSE RECORDS
"IL SOGNO"	2021	—	OST Teka-teki Tika	REDROSE RECORDS
"Yth: Naif" (with Diskoria, Ardhito Pramono & KawaNAIF)	2021	—	Single non-album	Suara Disko
"IL SOGNO" (with Deadsquad)	2022	—	Single non-album	Redrose Records
"my Mystery"	2022	—	ISYANA	Redrose Records
"mindblowing!"	2023	—	ISYANA	Redrose Records
"Hadiah Istimewa" (with Chandra Satria)	2023	—	Petualangan Sherina 2 (Original Motion Piture Soundtrack)	Trinity Optima Production
"Home" (with Rayhan Maditra)	2023	—	ISYANA	Redrose Records
"Ada-Ada Aja"	2023	—	Single non album	Redrose Records
"Under God's Plan" (with Mantra Vutura)	2023	—	ISYANA	Redrose Records
"Aku Rindu"	2024	—	Eklektiko	Redrose Records
"My Mystery" (with Marty Friedman	2024	—	Eklektiko	Redrose Records
"Hari Ini" (with Hindia)	2025	—	Eklektiko	Redrose Records
"Frenemy" (with Vidi Aldiano)	2025	—	Eklektiko	Redrose Records
"Something New" (with Afgan)	2025	—	Eklektiko	Redrose Records
"Game of Love"	2025	—	Eklektiko	Redrose Records
"Bunga Terakhir" (with Iwan Fals)	2025	—	OST Panji Tengkorak	Falcon Music
"I'm on My Way"	2025	—	Eklektiko	Redrose Records
"Babel"	2026	—	Eklektiko	Redrose Records
"Tunggu Aku" (with Tadi & MAKO•)	2026	—	Single non album	Redrose Records
"Garuda di Dadaku"	2026	—	OST Garuda di Dadaku Animation Film	Base Entertainment Redrose Records
"BURN"	2026	—	Eklektiko	Redrose Records
"Dogs Are Always True" (with Jason Ranti & Lafa Pratomo)	2026	—	Garis Tegak (EP)	KithLabo

== Filmography ==
=== Film ===
Year	Title	Role	Note	Ref.
2018	Milly & Mamet	Rika	Cameo (debut)	
2020	Nanti Kita Cerita Tentang Hari Ini	Awan's daughter	Cameo	
2023	Petualangan Sherina 2	Ratih Syailendra	Supporting act	

=== Documentar ===
Year	Title	Role	Note	Ref
2023	Music & Cultural Documentary (All Rounder)	Guest Star	Released on KBS TV	

=== Television ===
Year	Title	Role	Note	Network
2015	Berpacu Dalam Melodi	Herself	Contestant	NET TV
2015	The East	Herself	Special Guest Star (Episode 41)	NET TV
2019	The Voice Indonesia	Herself	Coach	GTV
2021	The Voice Kids Indonesia	Herself	Winning Coach	GTV
2021	MasterChef Indonesia season 8	Herself	Guest Judge	RCTI
2021	AXN Ultimate Challenge Indonesia	Guest Star	Episode 1-6	AXN Asia
2022	The Voice All Stars Indonesia	Herself	Coach	GTV
2025	Indonesian Idol season 13	Guest Judge	Showcase 1 & 2	RCTI
2026	The Icon Indonesia season 1	Herself	Judge	SCTV

=== Talkshow Program ===
Year	Title	Role	Production	Network	Ref.
2021	METAL	Host	WAW Entertainment	YouTube	

=== Web series ===
Year	Title	Role	Note	Network	Ref.
2017	Isyana's Story of Two Rainbows	Herself	(Episode 1-5)	Youtube Cornetto Indonesia	
2018	Call Me Ai: A Story of The Expert	Ai	(Episode 1-3)	Youtube Oppo Indonesia	

== Awards ==
=== Vocal (Soprano) ===
International & National

- 2014 Awarded the "RCM Excellence Award (Degree)" Scholarship
- 2013 1st Winner (Grand Prize) Tembang Puitik Ananda Sukarlan National Vocal Competition (Surabaya, Indonesia)
- 2013 Awarded the "NAFA Entry Scholarship (Degree)" (Full Scholarship)
- 2013 Gold Certificate, 5th Bangkok Opera Foundation Singing Competition (Bangkok, Thailand)
- 2012 First Prize, 6th Tan Ngiang Kaw/Tan Ngiang Ann Memorial Vocal Competition (Singapore)
- 2010 Tuition Grant from Singapore MOE for Diploma Study at NAFA

=== Electone ===
International

- 2012 Semi-finalist Yamaha Electone Electone Concours 2011 – Open Age Section (Tokyo, Japan) Yamaha Music Scholarship in Asia (Singapore)
- 2011 Grand Prize, Asia Pacific Electone Festival 2011 – Open Age Section (Singapore)
- 2009 Yamaha Music Scholarship in Asia 2009 (Indonesia)
- 2008 International Junior Original Concert (IJOC) – Top 12 best compositions (Tokyo, Japan)
- 2008 Third Prize, Asia Electone Festival (AEF) 2008 – Junior Section (Indonesia)
- 2005 Grand Prize, Asia Electone Festival (AEF) 2005 – Junior Section (Indonesia)

National

- 2011 Grand Prix Award, Yamaha Electone Festival 2011 – Open Age Section (Singapore)
- 2009 Second Prize, National Yamaha Electone Festival 2009 (Jakarta, Indonesia) Grand Prix Award, Yamaha Electone Festival 2009 – Open Section (Bandung, Indonesia)
- 2008 Grand Prize, National Yamaha Electone Festival 2008, Junior Section (Surabaya, Indonesia)
- 2005 Second Prize, National Yamaha Electone Festival 2005 – Junior Section (Jakarta, Indonesia)

=== Piano ===
National & Regional

- 2010 Finalist, Yamaha Piano Competition Indonesia (Jakarta, Indonesia)
- 2010 First prize, Yamaha Piano Competition West Java Regional (Bandung, Indonesia)
- 2009 First Prize, Piano Competition Pianist Bandung (Bandung, Indonesia)
- 2008 Participant, UPH Chopin Piano Competition (Jakarta, Indonesia)
- 2007 Finalist, Yamaha Piano Competition Indonesia (Jakarta, Indonesia) First prize, Piano Competition West Java Regional (Indonesia)

== Honors and awards ==
Isyana is the recipient of awards from Anugerah Musik Indonesia, Billboard Indonesia, Cornetto Pop Awards, Dahsyatnya Awards, Hai Reader's Poll Music Awards, Inbox Awards, Indonesian Box Office Movie Awards (IBOMA), Indonesian Choice Awards, Insert Awards, Maya Awards, Rolling Stone Editor's Choice Awards, SCTV Music Awards, Showbiz Indonesia Awards and other.

Isyana was named Best Asian Artist Indonesia 2016 and Best Composer of the Year 2017 at the MAMA (Mnet Asian Music Awards) and 2 Anugerah Planet Muzik. In late 2017 Isyana was nominated for Best Southeast Asia Act at the MTV EMA, London. For her contribution and support to Indonesian music, she was given the 2016 Anugerah Kekayaan Intelektual Nasional award (certificate of appreciation for Copyright and Related Rights) from the Ministry of Law and Human Rights.

== Concerts ==
Solo Concerts
Year	Concert title	Detail	Venue	Ref.
20 May 2020	LEXICON+ Virtual Home Concert	Virtual concert for LEXICON album; Charity concert for Covid-19 victims	Online Concert (virtual)	
2022	LEXICONCERT Live on Tour	Tours for LEXICON album	3 June: Jakarta, Basbetball Hall Senayan; 10 June: Bandung, Eldorado Dome; 17 June: Semarang, Sam Poo Kong; 15 July: Surabaya, DBL Arena; 22 July: Bali, Taman Bhagawan	
2023	ISYANA: The 4 th Album Showcase Live on Tour	Tours for ISYANA album	28 July: Cirebon, Bagas Raya Cirebon Hall; 01 August: Kudus, Auditorium Muria Kudus University; 05 August: Yogyakarta, Bima Hall A - Jogja Expo Center; 09 August: Malang, Preston Coffe CO; 30 August: Makassar, Auditorium Politeknik Pariwisata Makassar; 13 December: Semarang, SMI Building; 15 December: Padang, Fabriek Block; 17 December: Medan, POS Block	
2024	Isyana Sarasvati Journey in Harmony	Showcase	08 May: Explore!, Krapela - Jakarta; 15 May: Paradox, Krapela - Jakarta; 22 May: Lexicon, Krapela - Jakarta; 29 May: ISYANA, Krapela - Jakarta	
16 November 2024	Lost In Harmony	a Decade Live Concert	Istora Senayan, Jakarta - Indonesia	
20 June 2026	Isyana Sarasvati Intimate Accoustic Concert	Intimate Concert for Eklektiko album	Gedung Kesenian Jakarta, Indonesia	

Supporting acts
Year	Concert title	Artist	Acts	Venue	Ref.
2019	Thank You & Goodnight Tour	Boyzone	Opening Act & Collaboration	Tennis Indoor Senayan	
2023	Soundrenaline 2023	Thirty Seconds to Mars & Jared Leto	Collaboration	Carnaval Ancol, Jakarta	
2026	Avenged Sevenfold Live in Indonesia	Avenged Sevenfold	Opening Act	Jakarta International Stadium	

International Music Festival

- Java Jazz Festival, JIExpo Kemayoran (2015)
- Java Jazz Festival, JIExpo Kemayoran (2016)
- Prambanan Jazz Festival, Prambanan temple – Yogyakarta (2017)
- We the Fest, JIExpo Kemayoran (2018)
- Java Jazz Festival, JIExpo Kemayoran (2019)
- Java Jazz Festival, JIExpo Kemayoran (2020)
- Prambanan Jazz Festival, (Virtual Festival Edition) Prambanan temple – Yogyakarta (2020)
- Round Festival (ASEAN & KOREA ON-TACT MUSIC FESTIVAL), A Music Network Connecting ASEAN & KOREA (2020)
- We the Fest, GBK Sports Complex, Senayan (2022)
- City Roars Festival, Zepp KL - Malaysia (2023)
- Billboard Live Yokohama, Yokohama - Japan (2023)
- Isyana Unplugged in Tokyo, Yamaha Hall, Ginza - Japan (2023)
- SXSW Festival, Sydney - Australia (2023)
- Round Festival (Asean and Korea On-Tact Music Festival), Jakarta - Indonesia (2023)
- LUCFest, Tainan - Taiwan (2023)
- Asian Pop Festival, Paradise City, Incheon - South Korea (2024)
- Lalala Fest, JIEXPO Kemayoran, Jakarta - Indonesia (2024)
- Java Jazz Festival, JIEXPO Kemayoran (2025)
- Pentaport Rock Festival, Songdoo Moonlight Festival Park, Incheon - South Korea (2026)
- Lalala Fest Manila, World Trade Center Manila, Manila - Philippines (2026)
- Yamaha Gala Concert, Tokyo - Japan (2026)
- Fireball Fest, Taoyuan, Taiwan (2026)

== Leadership experiences ==
- 2009–2010 President Student Organisation Taruna Bakti Senior High School (Bandung, Indonesia)
- 2007 Chairperson of English Division, Taruna Bakti Problem Solving Contest (Bandung, Indonesia)
- 2006–2007 Vice President Student Organisation Taruna Bakti Secondary School (Bandung, Indonesia)
- 2006 Participant 1st International Convention for Youth Leaders, Singapore (RGS-ICYL 2006)
