= The Heartbreak Club =

2021 Indonesian film

- Indonesian: Sobat Ambyar
- Directed by: Charles Gozali; Bagus Bramanti
- Written by: Bagus Bramanti; Gea Rexy
- Produced by: Linda Gozali; Didi Kempot (executive)
- Starring: Dede Satria; Denira Wiraguna; Emil Kusumo; Sisca JKT48; Asri Welas; Erick Estrada
- Cinematography: Hani Pradigya
- Edited by: Ryan Purwoko
- Production companies: Magma Entertainment; Ideosource Entertainment; Paragon Pictures; Rapi Films
- Distributed by: Netflix
- Release date: January 14, 2021
- Running time: 101 minutes
- Country: Indonesia
- Languages: Indonesian; Javanese

The Heartbreak Club (Indonesian: Sobat Ambyar) is a 2021 Indonesian musical romantic comedy film directed by Charles Gozali, written by Bagus Bramanti and starring Bhisma Mulia, Denira Wiraguna, Dede Satria, and Emil Kusumo.

== Synopsis ==
Forced to close his cafe business in Solo due to bankruptcy, Jatmiko (Bhisma Mulia) does not expect to meet Saras (Denira Wiraguna), his last customer. Jatmiko did not dare to argue. Luckily, Anjani (Sisca JKT48), his sister, and Kopet (Erick Estrada), his best friend, swiftly help Jatmiko. Jatmiko and Saras are getting closer. The cafe was again crowded with customers. However, Saras does not reply to Jatmiko during her time away from Solo and chooses to date Abdul (Rezca Syam). Jatmiko collapsed, even fainted while watching Lord Didi Kempot's concert. With the help of Friend Ambyar and Lord Didi's advice, Jatmiko was finally able to make his choice.

== Cast ==
- Bhisma Mulia as Jatmiko
- Denira Wiraguna as Saras
- Rezca Syam as Abdul
- Dede Satria
- Emil Kusumo
- Asri Welas
- Fransisca Saraswati Puspa Dewi
- Didi Kempot
- Dwiky Al Asyam as Patung
- Erick Estrada as Kopet
- Mo Sidik as Om Faris

== Release ==
The film was released direct-to-streaming on January 14, 2021, by Netflix.
