= Lexicon (Isyana Sarasvati album) =

- Album cover

Studio album by Isyana Sarasvati
- Released: November 29, 2019
- Recorded: 2019
- Studios: Isyana Sarasvati Studio; GeStudio; KL Studio; SoundVerve Studio; Bro’s Studio; Slingshot Studio
- Genres: Neo classic; progressive rock
- Length: 33:12
- Label: Sony Music Entertainment Indonesia
- Producers: Isyana Sarasvati; Gerald Situmorang; Tohpati; Kenan Loui Widjaja

Isyana Sarasvati chronology
| Paradox (2017) | Lexicon (2019) | ISYANA (2023) |

Singles from Lexicon
- 1. "untuk hati yang terluka." Released: August 29, 2019; 2. "ragu Semesta" Released: October 16, 2019; 3. "Sikap Duniawi" Released: November 29, 2019; 4. "Lagu Malam Hari" Released: May 2, 2020

Lexicon awards and nominations
| Wins | 9 | |
| Nominations | 6 | |
- Pending

Lexicon (stylized in all caps) is the third studio album by Isyana Sarasvati, it was released on November 29, 2019, by Sony Music Entertainment Indonesia. The main song of the album is "untuk hati yang terluka.", "ragu Semesta", and "Sikap Duniawi". The Album was sold in a Box Set sold through on @belialbumfisik site and other digital store sites.

== Theme and background ==
LEXICON became Isyana Sarasvati's third album after releasing the album Explore! which was released in November 2015 and Paradox in September 2017. Different from the previous two albums in the Pop and R&B genres, LEXICON album carries a theatrical theme which is the classic or opera genre is Isyana's true identity. All the songs on the LEXICON album are neo classic and one song with a progressive rock genre entitled "Lexicon". On this album, Isyana tries to show her idealism side.

LEXICON contains eight song numbers that have been prepared since the end of 2018, but were not immediately given to the Sony Music Entertainment label. The album's introduction was made since releasing the single "untuk hati yang terluka.", "ragu Semesta", as well as the most recent "Sikap Duniawi", released in conjunction with LEXICON. On the day of the release of the album, Isyana also held an intimate showcase for 100 lucky fans and other invited guests.

I likened LEXICON to a dictionary. I want friends who want to know Isyana Sarasvati more deeply to enter an episode of Isyana's journey that has never been revealed anywhere. I like giving a dictionary of my life wrapped in melody, instrumentation with lyrics.

Isyana Sarasvati's said at Shoemaker, Cikini, Central Jakarta, Friday, November 29, 2019.

LEXICON summarizes several episodes of Isyana Sarasvati's journey. What's different, this time Isyana freed herself from the production, the selection of producers involved, to the concept of a special box set. The album is produced by Isyana Sarasvati with Gerald Situmorang, Kenan Loui, and Tohpati. The work of the LEXICON album was done for one month until finally it was released to close this November. Isyana played a full role in the arrangement of songs in the album.

== Track listing ==
All tracks are written by Isyana Sarasvati.

| No. | Title | Writer(s) | Producers | Length |
|---|---|---|---|---|
| 1. | "Sikap Duniawi" | Isyana Sarasvati | Tohpati; Isyana Sarasvati | 4:25 |
| 2. | "untuk hati yang terluka." | Isyana Sarasvati | Gerald Situmorang | 4:17 |
| 3. | "Pendekar Cahaya" | Isyana Sarasvati | Kenan Loui | 3:01 |
| 4. | "Lexicon" | Isyana Sarasvati | Kenan Loui | 4:36 |
| 5. | "ragu Semesta" | Isyana Sarasvati | Kenan Loui | 5:30 |
| 6. | "Lagu Malam Hari" | Isyana Sarasvati | Gerald Situmorang | 3:30 |
| 7. | "biarkan aku tertidur" | Isyana Sarasvati | Isyana Sarasvati | 3:16 |
| 8. | "Terima Kasih" | Isyana Sarasvati | Isyana Sarasvati | 4:08 |
| Total length: | | | | 33:12 |

== Awards ==
=== Anugerah Musik Indonesia ===
| Year | Category | Detail | Result | Ref. |
|---|---|---|---|---|
| 2020 | Best Progressive Production Work | Sikap Duniawi | Won | |
| 2020 | Best of the Best Album | LEXICON | Nominated | |
| 2020 | Best Pop Female Solo Artist | untuk hati yang terluka. | Nominated | |
| 2020 | Best Pop Songwriting | untuk hati yang terluka. | Nominated | |

=== Billboard Indonesia ===
| Year | Category | Detail | Result | Ref. |
|---|---|---|---|---|
| 2020 | Best Indonesian Album 2019 by Billboard Indonesia x Kompas.com | LEXICON | #1 | |

=== Forbes ===
| Year | Awards | Category | Detail | Result | Ref. |
|---|---|---|---|---|---|
| 2019 | Forbes Indonesia | 30 under 30 Forbes Indonesia | Herself | Recipient | |
| 2020 | Forbes Asia | 30 under 30 Forbes Asia | Herself | Recipient | |

=== Jak FM (2020 Local Music Heroes) ===
| Year | Category | Detail | Result | Ref. |
|---|---|---|---|---|
| 2020 | Favorite Virtual Concert | LEXICON+ Virtual Home Concert | Won | |
| 2020 | Favorite Female Heroes | Herself | Nominated | |

=== KISS Awards ===
| Year | Category | Detail | Result | Ref. |
|---|---|---|---|---|
| 2020 | Best of Pop Female Singer | Herself | Nominated | |

=== Maya Awards ===
| Year | Category | Detail | Result | Ref. |
|---|---|---|---|---|
| 2020 | Best Music Video Clip | Sikap Duniawi | Won | |
| 2020 | Best Original Soundtrack | untuk hati yang terluka. (OST. Nanti Kita Cerita tentang Hari Ini) | Nominated | |

=== Pop Hari Ini ===
| Year | Category | Detail | Result | Ref. |
|---|---|---|---|---|
| 2020 | Best Indonesian Album 2019 by Pop Hari Ini | LEXICON | Won | |

=== Tempo magazine ===
| Year | Category | Detail | Result | Ref. |
|---|---|---|---|---|
| 2020 | One of Best Top 9 Indonesia Music Album 2019 | LEXICON | Recipient | |

=== tirto.id ===
| Year | Category | Detail | Result | Ref. |
|---|---|---|---|---|
| 2020 | One of Best Top 10 Indonesia Music Album 2019 | LEXICON | Recipient | |

=== Review ===
Professional ratings
Review scores
| Source | Rating |
|---|---|
| Cultura | 4/5 stars |

Yucki, bernadetta from Cultura Magazine gave the following response "Presenting classical music with lyrics like old poetic literature". Overall, Isyana Sarasvati has shown its true colors in music and well executed. Through each single in this album, Isyana made the music genre relevant again in the Indonesian music industry. With honest lyrics and beautiful & poetic word choice, every track in LEXICON is able to be a medicine and inspiration for listeners to live their lives.
