= Isyana (album) =

- Album cover

Studio album by Isyana Sarasvati
- Released: 26 May 2023
- Recorded: 2020–2023
- Studios: Isyana Sarasvati Studio; KL Studio
- Length: 42:15
- Label: Redrose
- Producers: Isyana Sarasvati; Enrico Octaviano; Kenan Loui; Mantra Vutura; Rayhan Maditra

Isyana Sarasvati chronology
| Lexicon (2019) | Isyana (2023) | Eklektiko (2026) |

Singles from Isyana
- 1. "Unlock the Key" Released: 28 October 2020; 2. "Il Sogno" Released: 6 March 2021; 3. "Il Sogno feat Deadsquad" Released: 27 December 2021; 4. "my Mystery" Released: 1 June 2022; 5. "mindblowing!" Released: 14 July 2023; 6. "Home feat Rayhan Madrita (MV)" Released: 7 November 2023; 7. "Under God's Plan (MV)" Released: 2 December 2023

Isyana (stylized in all caps) is the fourth studio album by Indonesian singer and songwriter, Isyana Sarasvati, released on 26th May 2023 through her independent record label, Redrose Records.

Marking her first full-length release under the label, the 11-track album blends opera, progressive rock, progressive metal, and pop music and features guest appearances from the electronic duo Mantra Vutura and Sarasvati's husband, Rayhan Maditra.

== Background and composition ==
Following the release of her third studio album Lexicon in 2019, which shifted her musical style from pop and R&B toward neoclassical and progressive rock, Sarasvati founded her own independent label, Redrose Records, on 20 October 2020. Between 2020 and 2022, she released several singles, including "Unlock the Key", "Il Sogno" (which later received a metal version with Deadsquad), and "My Mystery"—to bridge the transition toward her fourth studio record.

According to Sarasvati, "Isyana" grew out of personal reflection and maturation following the COVID-19 pandemic. During a press conference at Gedung Kesenian Jakarta on the day of its release, she explained that choosing a self-titled name reflects a milestone in her life and musical identity.

== Track listing ==
All tracks are written by Isyana Sarasvati, except those signed.

ISYANA
| No. | Title | Writer(s) | Produser | Length |
|---|---|---|---|---|
| 1. | "Intro : If I Can Turn Back Time" | | Kenan Loui | 1:00 |
| 2. | "my Mystery" | | Loui | 5:12 |
| 3. | "Prelude I" (feat Mantra Vutura) | Isyana Sarasvati; Tristan Juliano; Zakari Danubrata | Mantra Vutura; Loui | 1:23 |
| 4. | "Il Sogno" | | Loui | 3:34 |
| 5. | "Mindblowing!" | Sarasvati; Loui | Loui | 3:43 |
| 6. | "Under God's Plan" (feat Mantra Vutura) | Sarasvati; Juliano; Danubrata | Mantra Vutura; Enrico Octaviano | 6:51 |
| 7. | "Unlock the Key" | | Loui | 4:31 |
| 8. | "Isyana" | | Rayhan Maditra | 0:53 |
| 9. | "Home" (feat Rayhan Maditra) | Sarasvati; Maditra | Maditra | 5:16 |
| 10. | "Home" (Stripped Version) (feat Rayhan Maditra) | Sarasvati; Maditra | Maditra | 5:16 |
| 11. | "Unlock the Key" (Electone Version) (feat Kenan Loui) | | Loui | 4:30 |
