= Milly & Mamet: Ini Bukan Cinta & Rangga =

- Theatrical release poster
- Directed by: Ernest Prakasa
- Written by: Ernest Prakasa; Meira Anastasia
- Based on: Characters by Rudi Soedjarwo
- Produced by: Chand Parwez Servia; Mira Lesmana; Fiaz Servia
- Starring: Sissy Priscillia; Dennis Adhiswara; Ernest Prakasa; Julie Estelle; Yoshi Sudarso; Dian Sastrowardoyo; Titi Kamal; Adinia Wirasti
- Cinematography: Robby Herbi
- Edited by: Ryan Purwoko
- Music by: Andhika Triyadi
- Production companies: Starvision; Miles Films
- Distributed by: Starvision; HOOQ (2018-2020)
- Release date: December 20, 2018
- Running time: 101 minutes
- Country: Indonesia
- Language: Indonesian

Milly & Mamet: Ini Bukan Cinta & Rangga is a 2018 Indonesian romantic comedy film directed by Ernest Prakasa. It is a spin-off of the 2002 movie Ada Apa Dengan Cinta?. Aside from being a director, Prakasa also acts as a screenwriter and performer.

This film was produced by 2 reliable Indonesian production companies, namely Starvision and Miles Films as the owner of Ada Apa Dengan Cinta? (2002). The two of them worked together to form a spin off from the story Ada Apa Dengan Cinta?, where the story focused on how Milly and Mamet built their household family.

== Synopsis ==
Continuing the Ada Apa Dengan Cinta? 2 story timeline, now Milly (Sissy Priscillia) and Mamet (Dennis Adhiswara) are preoccupied with taking care of their babies. Mamet who has a passion for cooking and worked as a chef now works at Papa Milly's factory. A rather forced choice, because now he became the foundation of their small family after Milly resigned from his profession as a banker to focus on raising children. Until one day, Mamet met Alexandra (Julie Estelle), a close friend in college. With enthusiasm, Alexandra told Mamet that she had gotten an investor to finance the idea of a restaurant that they had once imagined together. With the relationship between Mamet and Milly's Dad worsening, will Mamet accept this offer and pursue his dream? And how did Milly adapt to her new life as a full-time mom?

== Cast ==
- Sissy Priscillia as Milly
- Dennis Adhiswara as a Mamet
- Julie Estelle as Alexandra
- Yoshi Sudarso as James
- Dian Sastrowardoyo as Cinta
- Adinia Wirasti as Karmen
- Titi Kamal as Maura
- Ardit Erwandha as Robby
- Arafah Rianti as Sari / Milly's Assistant
- Roy Marten as Mr. Sony
- Ernest Prakasa as Yongki
- Isyana Sarasvati as Rika
- Eva Celia as Jojo
- Melly Goeslaw as Mamah Itje
- Aci Resti as IIN
- Dinda Kanyadewi as Lela
- Bintang Emon as Somat
- Tike Priatnakusumah as Bi Sum
- Muhadkly Acho as Hendra
- Surya Saputra as Rama
- Gebi Ramadhan as a seller of fried rice (Cameo)

== Music ==
- Sissy Priscillia – Kita
- Jaz – Berdua Bersama
- Jaz – Luluh
- Isyana Sarasvati Feat. Rara Sekar – Luruh
- Isyana Sarasvati – Stargazing
