= Billboard Indonesia Top 100 =

Record chart in Indonesia

The Billboard Indonesia Top 100 was the standard record chart in Indonesia for Indonesian language and/or English-Indonesian language songs, compiled independently in collaboration with ASIRI, with Andhika Septian as the head of this project who also developed its data scoring methodology, published weekly by Billboard Indonesia. It ranked the most popular songs in Indonesia based on digital downloads, airplay, online streaming, video streaming, and karaoke play.

The chart debuted on 25 September 2019, with the first number one song of the chart being Cinta Karena Cinta by Judika.

== See also ==
- Billboard (magazine)
