= Billboard Indonesia =

Online music magazine

- Website type: Online magazine
- Available in: Bahasa Indonesia
- Website: billboard-indonesia.com
- Launched: November 2018; 7 years ago

Billboard Indonesia is an Indonesian online music magazine. It served as the Indonesian version of Billboard, also featuring independent coverage of both Indonesian and international music content. It published pieces involving news, videos, interviews, releases reviews, event reviews, analysis of industry trends, and a K-pop dedicated news called Koreative. Billboard Indonesia was founded in November 2018, with Aldo Sianturi as chief operating officer (COO) and Adib Hidayat as Editor in Chief, both very experienced in the Indonesian music industry.

== Billboard Indonesia Top 100 ==
On 25 September 2019, Billboard Indonesia launched the Billboard Indonesia Top 100 music chart. It ranked the most popular Indonesian language and/or English-Indonesian language songs in Indonesia based on the data from digital downloads, airplay, online streaming, video streaming, radio station and karaoke play, compiled independently in collaboration with Asosiasi Industri Rekaman Indonesia, with Andhika Septian as the head of this project who also developed its data scoring methodology.

== See also ==
- Billboard charts
- Billboard (magazine)
- Billboard Indonesia Top 100
