= Anugerah Planet Muzik =

Singaporean music award ceremony

- Awarded for: Outstanding achievements in the Malay (including Malaysian and Indonesian) language music industry
- Location: Singapore
- Country: Malaysia; Indonesia; Singapore; Brunei
- First award: 2001
- Final award: 2018
- Website: Official Site

Television/radio coverage
- Network: (Singapore) Suria (2001-2018) (Malaysia) (Brunei) Astro Ria (2001-2018) (Malaysia) (Brunei) Astro Prima (2014) (Malaysia) (Brunei) Astro Ria HD (2015-2018) (Indonesia) TVRI (2005, 2018) (Indonesia) STAR TV ANTV (2006) (Indonesia) Global TV (2008-2012) (Indonesia) NET. (2013-2016) (Indonesia) Jak TV (2017)

The Anugerah Planet Muzik (translated as "Music Planet Award"), commonly referred to as "APM", is a Singaporean award ceremony honoring artists involved in the music industries of the Malay-speaking region in Southeast Asia (also known as the Nusantara), including those of Singapore, Malaysia, and Indonesia.

Organized by MediaCorp's Malay Broadcast Division, Suria, Warna 94.2FM, and Ria 89.7FM, the ceremony recognizes achievements in the regional Malay-Indonesian music industry. APM is supported by the Media Development Authority of Singapore (MDA), the Composers and Authors Society of Singapore (COMPASS), and the Indonesian Music Award Foundation (YAMI).

The event was first held in 2001 and has been held annually since, except in 2010 and 2019. Awards are given in various categories covering all participating countries, as well as specific awards for individual countries.

== Hosted By 3 Countries (Music Planet Awards) ==
Country	Main Host	Frequency	Year
Malaysia	Ziana Zain	1	2001
Malaysia	Syafinaz Selamat	1	2002
Malaysia	Linda Onn	1	2003
Malaysia	Datuk Aznil Nawawi	7	2003–2009
Malaysia	Didie Alias	1	2011
Malaysia	Dato' AC Mizal	2	2012–2013
Malaysia	Nabil Ahmad	2	2014–2018
Malaysia	Jihan Muse	1	2015
Malaysia	Sherry Alhadad	1	2016
Malaysia	Nabila Huda	1	2017
Singapore	Suhaimi Yusof	4	2001, 2007–2008, 2016
Singapore	Najib Ali	1	2003
Singapore	Adi Rahman	5	2004–2006, 2011, 2013
Singapore	Syed Ibrahim	1	2003
Singapore	AB Shaik	1	2004
Singapore	Fiza O	5	2006–2007, 2011, 2015, 2018
Singapore	Aura Shai	1	2009
Singapore	Muhd Tahar Ghalib (DJ TG)	1	2012
Singapore	Dyn Norahim	1	2014
Singapore	Dzar Ismail	1	2017
Indonesia	Sarah Sechan	7	2001–2003, 2004, 2008, 2013–2014
Indonesia	Shanty	2	2004–2005
Indonesia	Nirina Zubir	2	2006, 2009
Indonesia	DJ Fika Rosemary	1	2007
Indonesia	Daniel Mananta	2	2011, 2018
Indonesia	Sophie Navita	1	2012
Indonesia	Caesar Gunawan	1	2015
Indonesia	Desta	2	2016–2017

== Host country ==
Year	Host country	Venue	Hosts	Notes
2001	Singapore	Harbour Pavilion, World Trade Centre	(Singapore) Suhaimi Yusof (Indonesia) Sarah Sechan (Malaysia) Ziana Zain	
2002	Singapore	Singapore Expo	(Singapore) Adi Rahman (Indonesia) Sarah Sechan (Malaysia) Syafinaz Selamat	
2003	Malaysia	Stadium Putra, Bukit Jalil	(Singapore) Najip Ali (Singapore) Syah Ibrahim (Indonesia) Sarah Sechan (Malaysia) Aznil Nawawi (Malaysia) Linda Onn	
2004	Singapore	Singapore Expo, Hall 3	(Singapore) Adi Rahman (Singapore) AB Shaik (Indonesia) Shanty (Malaysia) Aznil Nawawi	
2005	Singapore	Suntec Convention Hall	(Singapore) Adi Rahman (Indonesia) Sarah Sechan (Indonesia) Shanty (Malaysia) Aznil Nawawi	In 2005, for the first time, an artist from Brunei, Faiz Nawi, was invited to perform at an APM event.
2006	Singapore	Max Pavilion, Singapore Expo	(Singapore) Adi Rahman (Singapore) Fiza O (Indonesia) Nirina Zubir (Malaysia) Aznil Nawawi	
2007	Singapore	Singapore Indoor Stadium	(Singapore) Suhaimi Yusof (Singapore) Fiza O (Indonesia) DJ Fika Rosemary (Malaysia) Aznil Nawawi	
2008	Malaysia	Kuala Lumpur Convention Centre	(Indonesia) Sarah Sechan	
2009	Indonesia	Jakarta Convention Center	(Singapore) Aura Shai (Indonesia) Nirina Zubir (Malaysia) Aznil Nawawi	
2010	No ceremony held			
2011	Singapore	Max Pavilion, Singapore Expo	(Singapore) Adi Rahman (Singapore) Fiza O (Indonesia) Daniel Mananta (Malaysia) Didie Alias	
2012	Singapore	Max Pavilion, Singapore Expo	(Singapore) Muhd Tahar Ghalib (DJ TG) (Indonesia) Sophie Navita (Malaysia) Dato` AC Mizal	
2013	Singapore	Suntec City	(Singapore) Adi Rahman (Indonesia) Sarah Sechan (Malaysia) Dato` AC Mizal	After an eight-year break, another Bruneian artist, Jaz Hayat was invited to perform.
2014	Singapore	Suntec City Convention Centre	(Singapore) Dyn Norahim (Indonesia) Sarah Sechan (Malaysia) Nabil Ahmad	
2015	Singapore	Suntec City Convention Centre	(Singapore) Fiza O (Indonesia) Caesar Gunawan (Malaysia) Jihan Muse	
2016	Singapore	The Theatre @ MediaCorp	(Singapore) Suhaimi Yusof (Indonesia) Desta (Malaysia) Sherry Alhadad	Shunpei Nakagawa from Japan was the first artist from another region to be nominated for the awards.
2017	Singapore	MES Theatre	(Singapore) Dzar Ismail (Indonesia) Desta (Malaysia) Nabila Huda	
2018	Singapore	MES Theatre	(Singapore) Fiza O (Indonesia) Daniel Mananta (Malaysia) Nabil Ahmad	

== Award categories ==
=== Fans' Choice ===
==== Singapore Awards ====
- Most Popular Singapore Artiste
- Most Popular Singapore Song

==== Regional Awards ====
- APM Most Popular Artiste
- APM Most Popular Song
- Social Media Icon

=== Judge Category ===
==== Regional Awards ====
- Best New Artiste (Male)
- Best New Artiste (Female)
- Best Collaboration (Artist)
- Best Collaboration (Song)
- Best Male Artiste
- Best Female Artiste
- Best Duo/Group
- Best Band
- APM Best Song
- Best Song Malaysia
- Best Song Indonesia
- Best Song Singapore

=== Special awards ===
- Special Awards
- Anugerah Cipta
- APM Humanity Award
- Anugerah Rentas Planet

=== Defunct Awards ===
- Best Album (2001–2011)
- Best New Duo/Group
- Radio Hits of The Year (2012)
- New Media Nova
- Best Artiste (Singapore)
- Best Album (Singapore)

== Award winners ==
=== Best Song ===
Year	No	Best Song Singapore	Best Song Indonesia	Best Song Malaysia	APM Best Song	Country	Notes
2001	1st	"Cenderawasih" performed by 2D. Written by Zaidi Nandir & Rizhar Abdul Rahim.	Not Awarded		"Mencintaimu" performed by Krisdayanti. Written by Debi & Bimbo.	Indonesia	
2002	2nd	"Bersamamu" performed by Asiyah Sinnan.	Not Awarded		"Makin Aku Cinta" performed by Krisdayanti & Anang.	Indonesia	
2003	3rd	"Biru" performed by Jai.	Not Awarded		"Ada Apa Dengan Cinta" performed by Melly Goeslaw & Eric.	Indonesia	
2004	4th	"-" performed by Ferhad.	Not Awarded		"Rahasia Perempuan" performed by Ari Lasso. Written by Ahmad Dhani.	Indonesia	
2005	5th	"Oh Kasih" performed by Bhumiband. Written by Bhumiband.	Not Awarded		"Berhenti Berharap" performed by Sheila On 7.	Indonesia	
2006	6th	"Cinta Abadi" performed by Eka Mairina ft. Iskandar.	Not Awarded		"Dealova" performed by Once.	Indonesia	
2007	7th	"Usah Lepaskan" performed by Taufik Batisah.	Not Awarded		"Biarlah Rahsia" performed by Siti Nurhaliza. Written by Melly Goeslaw & Siti Nurhaliza.	Malaysia	
2008	8th	Not Awarded			"Nakal" performed by Gigi.	Indonesia	
2009	9th	Not Awarded			"Laskar Pelangi" performed by Nidji. Written by Nidji & Giring.	Indonesia	
2011	10th	"Lagu Teman" performed by The Lion Story ft. Zahidah. Written by Haramain Osman.	"Cintailah Aku Sepenuh Hati" performed by Ari Lasso. Written by Sandy Canester & Pay Ari Lasso.	"Awan Nano" performed by Hafiz. Written by M. Nasir & Buddhi Hekayat.	"Awan Nano" performed by Hafiz. Written by M. Nasir & Buddhi Hekayat.	Malaysia	Judah Lyne of The Lion Story was the first songwriter and award winner from the Philippines. Lyne has since won five awards for Best Singapore Song in 2011, 2015–2018
2012	11th	"Pulanglah" performed by Awi Rafael.	Not Awarded		"Kisah Hati" performed by Alyah. Written by Manusia Putih.	Malaysia	
2013	12th	"Jangan Ganggu Pacarku" performed by Aliff Aziz.	"Harus Terpisah" performed by Cakra Khan.	"Masih Aku Cinta" performed by Shila Amzah. Written by Shila Amzah.	"Harus Terpisah" performed by Cakra Khan.	Indonesia	
2014	13th	"Tiada Pengganti" performed by Sufie Rashid.	"Setelah Kau Tiada" performed by Cakra Khan.	"Lebih Indah" performed by Siti Nurhaliza. Written by Aubrey Suwito & Ad Samad.	"Setelah Kau Tiada" performed by Cakra Khan.	Indonesia	
2015	14th	"Lisa" performed by Iman's League ft. The Lion Story.	"Terlalu Lama Sendiri" performed by Kunto Aji.	"Assalamualaikum" performed by Faizal Tahir. Written by Audi Mok, Ezra Kong, Faizal Tahir & Omar K.	"Assalamualaikum" performed by Faizal Tahir. Written by Audi Mok, Ezra Kong, Faizal Tahir & Omar K.	Malaysia	
2016	15th	"Bertemu Kembali" performed by Haikal. Written by Haramain Osman & Judah Lyne.	"Dan Bernyanyilah" performed by Musikimia. Written by Fadly, Yoyo, Stephan, Rindra & Iksan Skuter.	"Hanya NamaMu" performed by Caliph Buskers. Written by Edry Abdul Halim.	"Hanya NamaMu" performed by Caliph Buskers. Written by Edry Abdul Halim.	Malaysia	
2017	16th	"Senyum Saja" performed by Aisyah Aziz & Haikal Ali. Written by Aisyah Aziz, Haikal Ali, Judah Lyne & Haramain Osman.	"Anganku Anganmu" performed by Isyana Sarasvati & Raisa. Written by Isyana Sarasvati & Raisa.	"Lelaki Teragung" performed by Dayang Nurfaizah. Written by Natasyah & Iman Imran.	"Senyum Saja" performed by Aisyah Aziz & Haikal Ali. Written by Aisyah Aziz, Haikal Ali, Judah Lyne & Haramain Osman.	Singapore	
2018	17th	"Racun" performed by Farhan Shah. Written by Judah Lyne & Haramain Osman.	"Jikalau Kau Cinta" performed by Judika. Written by Ryza Ahmad & Andi Rianto.	"Mata" performed by Ayda Jebat. Written by Audi Mok, Ishazee Ishak & Ayda Jebat.	"Jikalau Kau Cinta" performed by Judika. Written by Ryza Ahmad & Andi Rianto.	Indonesia	

=== Best Male & Female Artiste ===
Year	No	Best Male Artiste	Country	Best Female Artiste	Country
2001	1st	Chrisye	Indonesia	Krisdayanti / Siti Nurhaliza (tie)	/ Indonesia / Malaysia
2002	2nd	M. Nasir	Malaysia	Siti Nurhaliza	Malaysia
2003	3rd	Anang	Indonesia	Siti Nurhaliza	Malaysia
2004	4th	Iwan Fals	Indonesia	Siti Nurhaliza	Malaysia
2005	5th	Ari Lasso	Indonesia	Krisdayanti	Indonesia
2006	6th	Marcell	Indonesia	Jaclyn Victor	Malaysia
2007	7th	M. Nasir	Malaysia	Siti Nurhaliza	Malaysia
2008	8th	Anuar Zain	Malaysia	Krisdayanti	Indonesia
2009	9th	Afgan	Indonesia	Bunga Citra Lestari	Indonesia
2011	10th	Faizal Tahir	Malaysia	Rossa	Indonesia
2012	11th	Hafiz	Malaysia	Shila Amzah	Malaysia
2013	12th	Judika	Indonesia	Bunga Citra Lestari	Indonesia
2014	13th	Judika	Indonesia	Siti Nurhaliza	Malaysia
2015	14th	Judika	Indonesia	Raisa	Indonesia
2016	15th	Glenn Fredly	Indonesia	Raisa	Indonesia
2017	16th	Anuar Zain	Malaysia	Dayang Nurfaizah	Malaysia
2018	17th	Judika	Indonesia	Isyana Sarasvati	Indonesia

=== Best Duo/Group & Band ===
Year	No	Best Duo/Group	Country
2001	1st	KRU	Malaysia
2002	2nd	Padi	Indonesia
2003	3rd	Sheila on 7	Indonesia
2004	4th	Padi	Indonesia
2005	5th	Sheila On 7	Indonesia
2006	6th	Peterpan	Indonesia
2007	7th	Dewa 19	Indonesia
2008	8th	Gigi	Indonesia
2009	9th	Yovie & Nuno	Indonesia
2011	10th	3 Suara	Malaysia
2012	11th	Kotak	Indonesia

Year	No	Best Duo/Group	Country	Best Band	Country
2013	12th	Hafiz & Siti Nurhaliza	Malaysia	NOAH	Indonesia
2014	13th	Hafiz & Rossa	/ Malaysia / Indonesia	NOAH	Indonesia
2015	14th	Rossa & Afgan	Indonesia	Iman's League	Singapore
2016	15th	Afgan & Raisa	Indonesia	Musikimia	Indonesia
2017	16th	Faizal Tahir & Siti Nurhaliza	Malaysia	Armada	Indonesia
2018	17th	Gamaliel Audrey Cantika (GAC)	Indonesia	Sheila on 7	Indonesia

=== Best New Artist ===
Year	No	Best New Male Artiste	Country	Best New Female Artiste	Country	Best New Duo/Group	Country
2001	1st	Art Fadzil	Singapore	Andien	Indonesia	-	- -
2002	2nd	Rio Febrian	Indonesia	Shanty	Indonesia	-	- -
2003	3rd	Jai	Singapore	Sarah Raisuddin	Malaysia	Moluccas	Indonesia
2004	4th	Marcell	Indonesia	Agnes Monica	Indonesia	Utopia	Indonesia
2005	5th	Vince	Malaysia	Dia Fadilla	Malaysia	Bhumiband	Singapore
2006	6th	Ello	Indonesia	Nikki	Malaysia	Maliq & D’Essentials	Indonesia
2007	7th	Imran Ajmain	Singapore	Noryn Aziz	Malaysia	Letto	Indonesia
2008	8th	Faizal Tahir	Malaysia	Farah Asyikin	Malaysia	Meet Uncle Hussain	Malaysia
2009	9th	Aizat	Malaysia	Ayu Damit	Malaysia	Kotak	Indonesia
2011	10th	Sandhy Sondoro	Indonesia	Amanda Imani	Malaysia	Ana Raffali, Sohaimi Mior Hassan & Altimet	Malaysia
2012	11th	Anji	Indonesia	Raisa	Indonesia	Audionauts	Singapore

Year	No	Best New Male Artiste	Country	Best New Female Artiste	Country	Notes
2013	12th	Cakra Khan	Indonesia	Citra Scholastika	Indonesia	
2014	13th	Tulus	Indonesia	Fynn Jamal	Malaysia	
2015	14th	Kunto Aji	Indonesia	Elizabeth Tan	Malaysia	The first artists to be nominated from Brunei (Aziz Harun) as well as the Philippines (Mark Adam) were both nominated for Best New Artiste in 2015.
2016	15th	Rizky Febrian	Indonesia	Yuka Kharisma	Indonesia	
2017	16th	Virgoun	Indonesia	Gloria Jessica	Indonesia	
2018	17th	Adrian Khalif	Indonesia	Sara Fajira	Indonesia	

=== Best Collaboration ===
Year	No	Best Collaboration (Artiste)	Country	Best Collaboration (Song)	Country
2011	10th	Dayang Nurfaizah & Marcell for "Sayang"	/ Malaysia / Indonesia	-	- -
2012	11th	Taufik Batisah & Rossa for "Aku Bersahaja"	/ Singapore / Indonesia	-	- -
2013	12th	Najwa Latif, SleeQ & SyamKamarul for "Sahabat"	/ Malaysia / Singapore	-	- -
2014	13th	Altimet & Awi Rafael for "Kalau Aku Kaya"	/ Malaysia / Singapore	"Mimpi" performed by Aisyah Aziz. Written by Faizal Tahir	/ Singapore / Malaysia
2015	14th	Siti Nurhaliza & Cakra Khan for "Seluruh Cinta"	/ Malaysia / Indonesia	"Jangan Coba Berlari" performed by Sezairi. Written by Tulus	/ Singapore / Indonesia
2016	15th	Awi Rafael & Ayai for "Manusia Sempurna"	/ Singapore / Malaysia	"Beautiful" performed by Aziz Harun. Written by Faizal Tahir, Mike Chan, Omar K & Aziz Harun	/ Brunei / Malaysia
2017	16th	Afgan ft. SonaOne for "X"	/ Indonesia / Malaysia	"Tanda Tanya" performed by Aisyah Aziz. Written by Omar K, Ezra Kong & Ishazee Ishak	/ Singapore / Malaysia
2018	17th	Siti Nurhaliza & Judika for "Kisah Ku Inginkan"	/ Malaysia / Indonesia	"Teman Bahagia" performed by Jaz. Written by Ramadhan Handy "Soulvibe" & Asta Andoko "Ran".	/ Brunei / Indonesia

=== APM Most Popular Artist ===
Year	No	Most Popular Male Artiste	Country	Most Popular Female Artiste	Country	Most Popular Duo/Group	Country
2001	1st	M. Nasir	Singapore	Siti Nurhaliza	Malaysia	-	- -
2002	2nd	M. Nasir	Singapore	Siti Nurhaliza	Malaysia	Sheila On 7	Indonesia
2003	3rd	Anuar Zain	Malaysia	Siti Nurhaliza	Malaysia	Sheila On 7	Indonesia
2004	4th	Anuar Zain	Malaysia	Siti Nurhaliza	Malaysia	Exists	Malaysia
2005	5th	Anuar Zain	Malaysia	Siti Nurhaliza	Malaysia	Spider	Malaysia
2006	6th	Taufik Batisah	Singapore	Siti Nurhaliza	Malaysia	Peterpan	Indonesia
2007	7th	Mawi	Malaysia	Siti Nurhaliza	Malaysia	Sofaz	Malaysia
2008	8th	Faizal Tahir	Malaysia	Siti Nurhaliza	Malaysia	Estranged	Malaysia

Year	No	Malaysia Most Popular Artiste	Country	Indonesia Most Popular Artiste	Country	Singapore Most Popular Artiste	Country
2009	9th	Siti Nurhaliza	Malaysia	Yovie & Nuno	Indonesia	Taufik Batisah	Singapore

Year	No	APM Most Popular Artiste	Country
2009	9th	Siti Nurhaliza	Malaysia
2011	10th	Siti Nurhaliza (presented as APM Most Popular Artiste for a Decade)	Malaysia
2012	11th	Taufik Batisah	Singapore
2013	12th	Hafiz	Malaysia
2014	13th	Taufik Batisah	Singapore
2015	14th	Fatin Shidqia Lubis	Indonesia
2016	15th	Ayda Jebat	Malaysia
2017	16th	Khai Bahar	Malaysia
2018	17th	Khai Bahar	Malaysia

=== APM Most Popular Song ===
Year	No	Recipient	Country
2002	2nd	"Seandainya Masih Ada Cinta " performed by Dayang Nurfaizah	Malaysia
2003	3rd	"Ada Apa Dengan Cinta" performed by Melly Goeslaw ft. Eric	Indonesia
2004	4th	"Bukan Cinta Biasa" performed by Siti Nurhaliza	Malaysia
2005	5th	"Lagu Rindu" performed by Siti Nurhaliza	Malaysia
2006	6th	"Aduh Saliha" performed by Mawi	Malaysia
2007	7th	"Kian" performed by Mawi	Malaysia
2008	8th	"Itu Kamu" performed by Estranged	Malaysia
2009	9th	Awards were given to each representing countries:- "Impianku" performed by Didicazli "Hanya Kau Yang Mampu" performed by Aizat "Kul Cinta" performed by Slank	Singapore Malaysia Indonesia
2011	10th	"Angkasa" performed by Hady Mirza	Singapore
2012	11th	"Tetap Kan Menunggu" performed by Hady Mirza	Singapore
2013	12th	"Muara Hati" performed by Hafiz ft. Siti Nurhaliza	Malaysia
2014	13th	"Dia Dia Dia" performed by Fatin Shidqia Lubis	Indonesia
2015	14th	"#AwakKatMane" performed by Taufik Batisah	Singapore
2016	15th	"Pencuri Hati" performed by Ayda Jebat	Malaysia
2017	16th	"Bayang" performed by Khai Bahar	Malaysia
2018	17th	"Tergantung Sepi" performed by Haqiem Rusli	Malaysia

=== Social Media Icon ===
The award was first given in the 11th edition of APM as "New Media Icon". It was renamed to "Social Media Icon" in the 12th edition.

Year	No	Recipient	Country
2012	11th	SleeQ	Singapore
2013	12th	SleeQ	Singapore
2014	13th	Taufik Batisah	Singapore
2015	14th	Taufik Batisah	Singapore
2016	15th	Ayda Jebat	Malaysia
2017	16th	Ayda Jebat	Malaysia
2018	17th	Khai Bahar	Malaysia

=== International Breakthru Artiste Award (Anugerah Rentas Planet) ===
The award is given to artist with significant international successes outside the region.

Year	No	Recipient	Country
2015	14th	Anggun	Indonesia
2016	15th	Yuna	Malaysia
2017	16th	Maher Zain	Sweden
2018	17th	No Recipient	

== Similar Awards ==
1. Anugerah Industri Muzik
2. Anugerah Musik Indonesia
