= 2012 Maya Awards =

Annual Indonesian film awards ceremony

1st Annual Maya Awards
- Date: December 15, 2012
- Location: The Bridge Function Room, Aston Hotel, Taman Rasuna, Kuningan, South Jakarta
- Country: Indonesia
- Most awards: Lovely Man (4)
- Most nominations: Arisan! 2 (10); The Raid (10)

The 1st Annual Maya Awards (Indonesian: Piala Maya 2012) was an award ceremony honoring the best in Indonesian films of 2012. The ceremony was held at The Bridge Function Room, Aston Hotel in Taman Rasuna, Kuningan, South Jakarta on 15 December 2012.

Lovely Man won the most awards with four.

== Winners and nominees ==
Winners are listed first and signified in bold letters.

=== Production ===
Best Feature Film	Best Director
Lovely Man; Arisan! 2; Cita-Citaku Setinggi Tanah; Mata Tertutup; Postcards from the Zoo; The Raid; Rayya, Cahaya di Atas Cahaya; Tanah Surga... Katanya	Teddy Soeriaatmadja – Lovely Man; Eugene Panji – Cita-Citaku Setinggi Tanah; Garin Nugroho – Mata Tertutup; Gareth Evans – The Raid; Viva Westi – Rayya, Cahaya di Atas Cahaya
Best Screenplay	Best Cinematography
Lovely Man – Teddy Soeriaatmadja; Tanah Surga... Katanya – Danial Rifki; Cita-Citaku Setinggi Tanah – Satriono; Mata Tertutup – Tri Sasongko; Rayya, Cahaya di Atas Cahaya – Viva Westi and Emha Ainun Nadjib	Hello Goodbye – Yunus Pasolang; Atambua 39 °Celsius – Hunar Nimpuno; Rayya, Cahaya di Atas Cahaya – Ipung Rahmat Syaiful; The Raid – Matt Flannery; Soegija – Teoh Gay Hian
Best Costume Design	Best Makeup & Hairstyling
Arisan! 2 – Isabelle Patrice; Postcards from the Zoo – Aulia Yogyanti; Dilema – Jerry Oktavianus; Soegija – Retno Ratih; Lovely Man – Ve Verdinand	Dilema – Jerry Oktavianus; Hi5teria – Cika Landis, Susanti, and Tweety; Arisan! 2 – Darwin Tse; Lovely Man – Ebba Syeba; The Raid – Jerry Oktavianus
Best Sound Design	Best Art Direction
Modus Anomali – Khikmawan Sentosa; The Raid – Arya Prayogi and Fajar Y.; Lovely Man – Khikmawan Sentosa; The Witness – Khikmawan Sentosa; Soegija – Satrio Budiono and Trisno	Soegija – Allan T. Sebastian; Arisan! 2 – Arie Juwono; Perahu Kertas – Fauzi; The Raid – Timothy D. Setianto; Modus Anomali – Wenisclaus
Best Film Score	Best Editing
Soegija – Djaduk Ferianto; Arisan! 2 – Aghi Narotama and Bemby Gusti; Garuda di Dadaku 2 – Aghi Narotama and Bemby Gusti; Perahu Kertas – Andika Triyadi; Mata Tertutup – Dwiki Dharmawan	The Raid – Gareth Evans; Republik Twitter – Aline Jusria; Modus Anomali – Arifin; Negeri 5 Menara – Cesa David Lukmansyah; Hello Goodbye – Robby Barus
Best Special Effects	Best Poster Design
Ambilkan Bulan – Kelik Wicaksono and Eddie Cahyono; Modus Anomali – Andi Noviandi; The Raid – Andi Noviandi; Mama Cake – Boras Animation and Onetone Post; The Witness – Gaffer	Sinema Purnama – Sarita Ibnoe; Langit Ketujuh – Clear Indonesia; Postcards from the Zoo – Diela Maharanie; Jakarta Hati – Jonathan Oh; The Raid – Omar Mallkison
Best Theme Song	Best Omnibus Film
"Perahu Kertas" composed by Dewi Lestari, performed by Maudy Ayunda – Perahu Kertas; "Black Glasses" composed and performed by Eru – Hello Goodbye; "Bogor Biru" composed and performed by Sore – Modus Anomali; "Malaikat Juga Tahu" composed and performed by Dewi Lestari – Malaikat Tanpa Sayap; "Oh Jakarta" composed by Ramondo Gascaro, performed by Sore – Arisan! 2	Kita vs. Korupsi; Hi5teria; Jakarta Hati; Parts of the Heart; Sanubari Jakarta; Sinema Purnama

=== Performers ===
Best Actor in a Leading Role	Best Actress in a Leading Role
Donny Damara – Lovely Man; Nicholas Saputra – Postcards from the Zoo; Reza Rahadian – Test Pack; Roy Marten – Dilema; Tio Pakusadewo – Rayya, Cahaya di Atas Cahaya	Jajang C. Noer – Mata Tertutup; Acha Septriasa – Test Pack; Atiqah Hasiholan – Hello Goodbye; Nani Widjaja – Ummi Aminah; Raihaanun – Lovely Man
Best Actor in a Supporting Role	Best Actress in a Supporting role
Rio Dewanto – Arisan! 2; Butet Kertaradjasa – Soegija; Fuad Idris – Tanah Surga... Katanya; Ramon Y. Tungka – Cinta di Saku Celana; Ray Sahetapy – The Raid	Adinia Wirasti – Arisan! 2; Aida Nurmala – Arisan! 2; Christine Hakim – Rayya, Cahaya di Atas Cahaya; Meriam Bellina – Test Pack; Wulan Guritno – Dilema
Best Young Performer	Best New Performer
M. Shihab – Cita-Citaku Setinggi Tanah; Lana Nitibagaskara – Ambilkan Bulan; Maria Resubun – Di Timur Matahari; Osa Aji Santoso – Tanah Surga... Katanya; Risjad Adjen – Rumah di Seribu Ombak	Annisa Hertami – Soegija; Billy Sandy – Negeri 5 Menara; Edward Gunawan – Arisan! 2; Eka Nusa Pertiwi – Mata Tertutup; Putri Moruk – Atambua 39 °Celsius
Best Actress in an Omnibus	Best Actor in an Omnibus
Gesata Stella – Sanubari Jakarta; Dominique Agisca Diyose – Kita vs. Korupsi; Luna Maya – Hi5teria; Revalina S. Temat – Kita vs. Korupsi; Shahnaz Haque – Jakarta Hati	Tim Matindas – Sinema Purnama; Daud Sumolang – Parts of the Heart; Dwi Sasono – Jakarta Hati; Gia Partawinata – Sanubari Jakarta; Tora Sudiro – Kita vs. Korupsi

=== Competition ===
Best Short Film	Best Short Animated Film
Shelter – Ismail Basbeth; Alegori – Albert Koto; Anak Kanal – Narindro Aryo Hutomo; Buang – Andri Cung and William Chandra; Garis Bawah – Ray Farandy Pakpahan; Gending Tengah Malam – Dedy Syah Putra; Kekal – Dom Dharmo; Undeadriot – M. Faris Rafiuddinsyah	Kitik! – Ardira Anugrah Putera; Black Journey – Astu Prasidya; Crayon – Sheila H. P.; Culoboyo Mekitik – Cak Ikin; Kripik Sukun Mbok Darmi – Heri K.; Langkah – Tika Hilda; Mitos – Dimas Sena Adimas Jati
Best Film Review	Best Regional Film
Taufiqur Rizal, for "Jakarta Hati: Warna Warni Wajah Jakarta" – Jakarta Hati; Arief Kurnia Pujoputanto, for "Malaikat Tanpa Sayap" – Malaikat Tanpa Sayap; Imam Santoso, for "Arisan! 2: Potret (Impian) Kehidupan Sosial Modern Indonesia" – Arisan! 2; Krisna M. Putra, for "Atambua 39C: Mentonton Budaya, Menengok Sejarah, Menilik Nasionalisme" – Atambua 39 Celcius; Krisna M. Putra, for "Lovely Man: Hubungan Absurd Ayah dan Anak" – Lovely Man	Maniwak – Ipong Wijaya (Papua); Perempuan Sasak Terakhir – Sandi Amaq Rinjani (Lombok); Lorok Badak – Darwin Mahesa (Banten)
Best Documentary Film
Negeri di Bawah Kabut – Shalahudin Siregar; Buruh Seni – Eden Junjung; Cerita dari Tapal Batas – Wisnu Adi; Jakartrack – Ari Rusyadi; Merajut Bambu 1000 Candi untuk Kemanusiaan – Cupu Dalang; Permata di Tengah Danau – Andi Hutagalung; Persona – George Arif

=== Special awards ===
- Gareth Evans for The Raid – For mainstreaming Indonesian martial arts, silat, to international audience.
- Nani Widjaja for Ummi Aminah – For her constant dedication to Indonesian films.
- Ira Maya Sopha for Mother Keder– For her four-decade career in Indonesian films.

== Multiple wins and nominations ==
The following films received multiple awards:

Film	Wins
Lovely Man	4
Arisan! 2 Soegija	3
Sinema Purnama	2

The following films receive multiple nominations:

Film	Nominations
Arisan! 2 The Raid	10
Lovely Man	8
Soegija	7
Mata Tertutup; Rayya, Cahaya di Atas Cahaya	6
Modus Anomali	5
Cita-Citaku Setinggi Tanah; Dilema; Hello Goodbye; Jakarta Hati; Kita vs. Korupsi; Postcards from the Zoo; Tanah Surga... Katanya	4
Hi5teria; Perahu Kertas; Sanubari Jakarta; Sinema Purnama; Test Pack	3
Ambilkan Bulan; Atambua 39 °Celsius; Malaikat Tanpa Sayap; Negeri 5 Menara; Parts of the Heart; The Witness	2
