= Furcadia =

- Login screen for Furcadia
- Developers: Dragon's Eye Productions, Inc. Catnip Studios
- Publishers: Dragon's Eye Productions, Inc. Catnip Studios
- Designers: Dr. Cat 'Manda; Ben Jans
- Platforms: Microsoft Windows, Web browsers (Chrome, Firefox, Edge, and others)
- Release: December 16, 1996
- Genre: Massively multiplayer online game
- Mode: Multiplayer

Furcadia is a free-to-play MMOSG/MMORPG or graphical MUD, set in a fantasy world inhabited by magical creatures. The game is based on user-created content with emphasis on world building tools, exploring, socializing, and free-form roleplaying. Furcadia hosts a large volunteer program called the Beekin Helpers, allowing players to help with community moderation, welcoming new players, handling in-game technical support, running in game events, creating art for the game itself, accessing and updating the game's website, and bug hunting. Furcadia holds the Guinness World Records title for the longest continuously running social MMORPG, as well as being one of the first games to heavily encourage modding and let users build virtual worlds for themselves. It was also one of the first freemium online games. In 2008, Furcadia was reported as having over 60,000 players.

== Gameplay ==
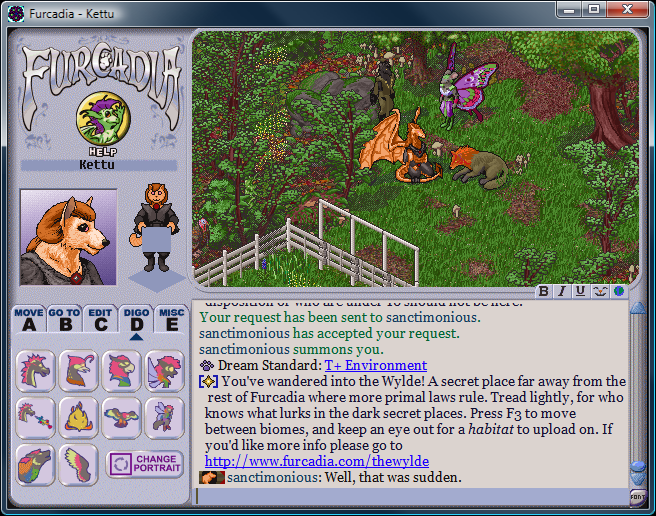
Furcadia screenshot

=== Characters ===
The character, or avatar on Furcadia can be set to one of 11 free species, including both humans, insects, and anthropomorphic animals. Players can choose between one of three genders: male, female, and unspecified. These genders modify the default portrait, butler (the large character art), and specitags, icons seen to the left of players' names in chat.

=== Customization ===
Players can customize their avatars by choosing colors from a palette. These colors are shown on the butler, walkabout, and portrait. The walkabout has a walking animation with the ability to stand, sit, or lie down. There are default portraits for each avatar, however, players may upload a 95x95 custom portrait for a small fee. 22 Custom avatars (non-gendered) may be added and used inside private dreams, for free.

Each character can also have a written description, which can include character details, external links to websites, or internal links to private dreams. Some players choose to link to third-party websites to extend their descriptions beyond the character-limit the standard Furcadia description allows.

=== Dreams ===
The primary focus of Furcadia is user-generated content. To this end, the Furcadia game download includes an art editor, a map creating program, a skin editor, and a script editor. Users are encouraged to create their own virtual worlds, called Dreams, using these free tools. These worlds can be uploaded to the Furcadia server for free and used for a variety of purposes, examples being text based role playing, a place to hang out with friends, or playing multiplayer games and quests with other users, etc. Dreams remain open to the public area in which they are uploaded, so long as it is inhabited, and, if unoccupied, it is eventually unloaded automatically.

While there are several types of dreams that are popular, users continue to create new things with the tools they are given. Furcadia hosts a variety of roleplaying dreams, ranging from strict-continuity roleplay (in which the dream is its own independent world) to persona play. Roleplaying dreams also come in a number of different forms, ranging from feral (wild animal) to furre (anthropomorphic animal) to human. Many dreams revolve around fantasy plots and themes, based on popular books, television programs, ancient mythology, or original creations of Furcadia players.

Furcadia itself is basically made up of several dreams, the ones made by its users and the main maps.

=== Patches ===
Almost all of the 6,000+ default art files shown in Furcadia can be patched over and displayed in a Dream, including the skin, buttons, avatars, items, walls, effects, lighting, ambience, portals, and floors. Additional art may be added to a Dream in file types ending with 'e', such as iteme, floore, etc., which does not overwrite the default art. Much user created patch art is available for download via third party websites. Dreams can also include the use of audio files in the WMA, Ogg, MOD, S3M, WAV and MIDI (.mid) formats.

=== Scripting ===
Players may add interactivity to dreams chiefly through a custom scripting language known as DragonSpeak, or "DS". DragonSpeak commands may be triggered by in-game actions or by custom buttons displayed over the game interface. Other custom scripting tools include PhoenixSpeak, which is used to store information to a permanent database, and an animation scripting language called KitterSpeak.

These scripting languages enable players to script actions ranging from the simple, like opening a door, to the more complex, such as a complete game of chess or laser-tag.

Dream owners are allowed to make and use bots to accomplish things that DragonSpeak cannot, but these are not officially supported by Furcadia.

==== Dream standards ====
Although Furcadia itself is unrated, individual dreams may specify a standard which details what kind of behavior, language, and content may be allowed. Before March 2007, Furcadia used a rating system akin to the MPAA film rating system. Since March 2007, Furcadia uses its own Dream standards system which allows users to define exactly what kind of behavior should be allowed on a per-dream basis. The Dream standards are based on age groups, ranging from Everyone8+ to Adult Only, with specific behavior, language, and content restrictions. Some main maps—FurN and Hawthorn (previously Haven/New Haven)—immediately block the user from entering the main map if they are not within the specified age group and parental controls are enabled.

== Development ==
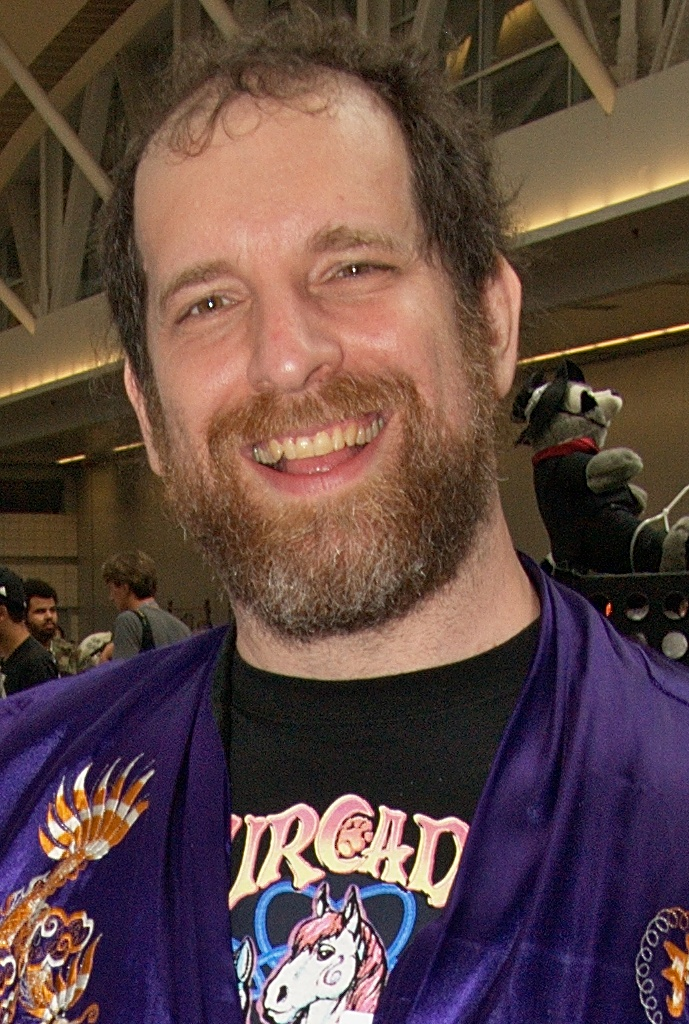
Furcadia developer Dr. Cat in 2009 at Anthrocon

David Shapiro (AKA Dr. Cat), a former employee of Origin Systems, launched DragonSpires as one of the Internet's first graphics-based multi-user dungeons (MUDs) in 1994. Unlike other graphical video games, DragonSpires focused on social relationships and peaceable community-building over combat and violence. The game was free to access. The novelty of the game interested multiple venture capital firms as well as Origin. The developers remade the title as Furcadia.

First opened to the public on December 16, 1996, Furcadia is developed by Dragon's Eye Productions, Inc (DEP) and later, Catnip Studios. At its public release, Furcadia featured a graphical improvement: art with a 256-color VGA palette. At the time, Furcadia was never intended to be an exclusively "furry" game.

New support for 24-bit non-remappable portraits (the first art to extend beyond 256 colors), and Windows Vista support, were implemented in the April 6, 2007 "Kitterwing Edition". On December 16, 2006, Furcadia became the first-ever MMORPG to celebrate ten years of continual service.

Furcadia was originally designed and programmed by David Shapiro (also known as Dr. Cat, or Felorin in-game) and 'Manda (known as Talzhemir in-game). Additional people have since been included as part owners for their work: game executive producer Emerald Kaiten Catz (known as Emerald Flame), who coordinates new development on the game, as well as who developed (and still coordinates) the Beekin volunteers project, Aleksi Asikainen (known as Fox, or sanctimonious), who created the game's editors and was involved in coding the client / server, though he no longer works for Furcadia, Ben Jans (known as Gar), the game's design director, and Michael Vondung (known as Cironir), who manages the community. The other DEP staff are involved with the game's art and programming development, as well as community affairs.

The iPhone/iPad/iPod Touch client was released on July 19, 2010, though it is no longer available for download.

In 2012 Furcadia launched a Kickstarter campaign to renovate the entire game in a series of updates called The Second Dreaming. This campaign was successful, and raised more than $100,000.

In 2016, Furcadia released "The Second Dreaming Part 1", which added new 32-bit worldbuilding tools, character enhancements, a web-based character creator and editor, and other massive updates to the graphics engine.

== Awards ==
- Finalist for the 5th IGDA awards
- Honorable Mention in WarCry Network Editor's Choice Awards 2006 (Indie Game of the Year)
- Softpedia Pick Award from Softpedia
