= Persona (disambiguation) =

A persona is a social role or a character played by an actor.

Persona or personas may also refer to:

- Persona (psychology), a Jungian complex
- Persona (satellite), a class of Russian reconnaissance satellite
- Persona (user experience), in marketing, a character representing a particular user type within a targeted demographic

== Arts and entertainment ==
- Persona (franchise), a video game franchise developed by Atlus
- Persona, a collection of photographs by Hiroh Kikai

=== Film and television ===
- Persona (1966 film), directed by Ingmar Bergman
- Persona (2000 film), directed by Takashi Komatsu
- Persona (2008 film), written and directed by Tatsuro Kashihara
- Persona (2012 film), written and directed by George Arif
- Şahsiyet, Turkish TV series translates as Persona
- Persona (TV series), South Korean anthology series
- "Persona", an episode of Law & Order: Special Victims Unit tenth season

=== Music ===
==== Albums and EPs ====
- Persona (Half Alive album), 2024
- Persona (Kangta album), 2005
- Persona (Karnivool EP), 2001
- Persona (Lorenzo Senni EP), 2016
- Persona (Mari Hamada album), 1996
- Persona (Marracash album), 2019
- Persona (Queen Latifah album), 2009
- Persona (Rival Consoles album), 2018
- Persona (Selah Sue album), 2022
- PersonA, by Edward Sharpe and the Magnetic Zeros, 2016
- Person(a), by Norman Iceberg, 1987
- Personae (album), by Jonas Hellborg, 2022
- Personas (album), by El Canto del Loco, 2008
- Map of the Soul: Persona, by BTS, 2019

==== Songs ====
- "Persona" (song), by RM of BTS, 2019
- "Persona", by Charli xcx on Music, Fashion, Film, 2026

== Business and brands ==
- Persona (identity verification service)
- Persona Communications, a former Canadian cable television operator now part of Eastlink
  - PersonaTV, a former television production subsidiary of the above
- Mazda Persona, a midsize sedan manufactured by Japanese automaker Mazda from 1988–1992
- Mozilla Persona, a defunct website authentication mechanism prototyped by Mozilla from 2011–2016
- Proton Persona, a series of compact/subcompact sedans manufactured by Proton since 2003

== See also ==
- Person (disambiguation)
- Latin phrases:
  - Actio personalis moritur cum persona, "personal action dies with the person"
  - Ad personam, "to the person"
  - Dramatis personæ, "the masks of the drama"
  - In persona Christi, "in the person of Christ"
  - Persona designata, "A person considered as an individual rather than as a member of a class"
  - Persona non grata (disambiguation), "unwelcome person"
- Third persona, an alienated audience implicitly ignored within a dialectic
