= Mawar Eva de Jongh =

Indonesian actress, singer, and model

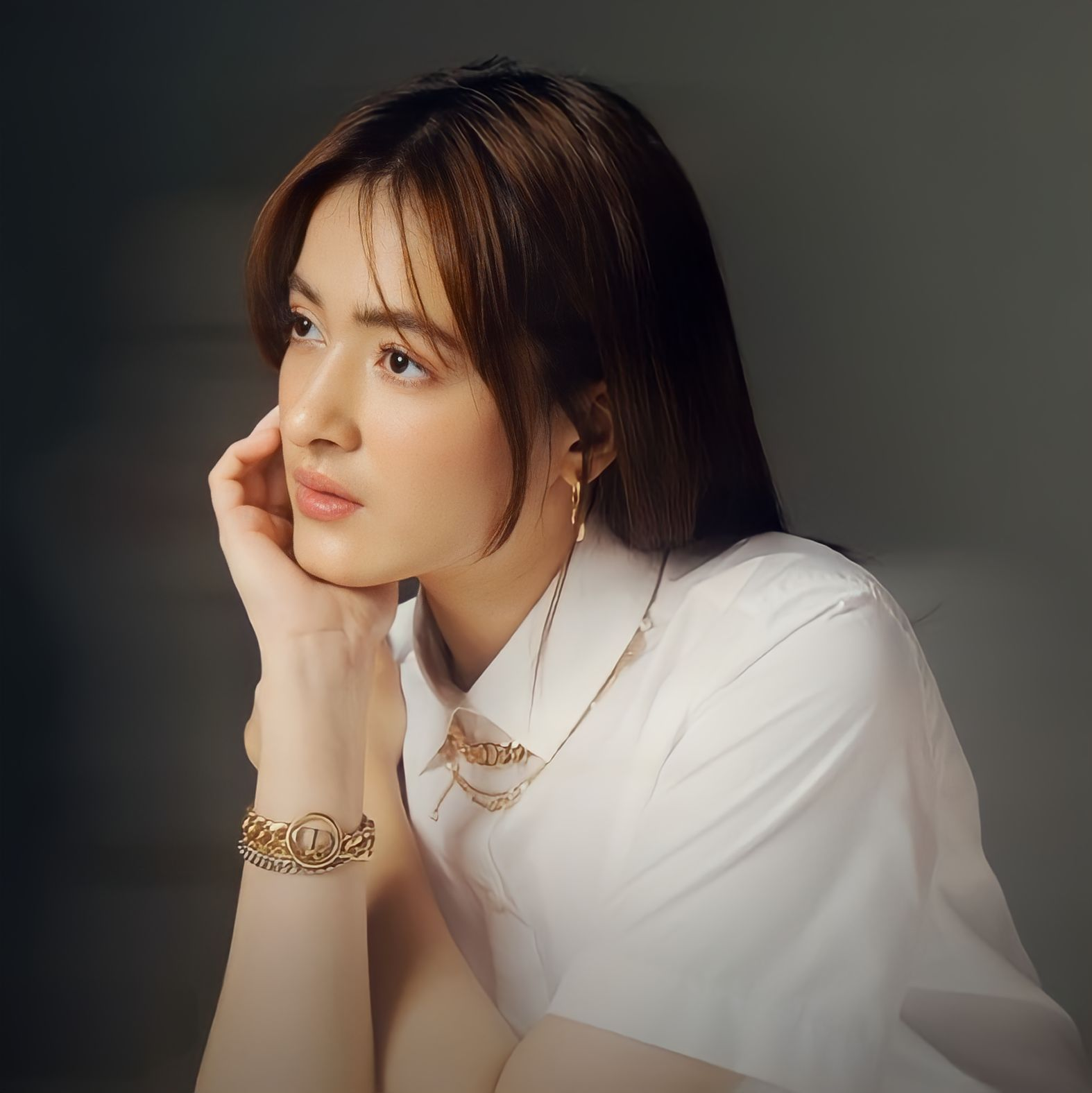
- Born: 26 September 2001 (age 24); Amsterdam, Netherlands
- Occupations: Actress; singer; model
- Years active: 2007—now
- Musical career
- Genres: Pop
- Instrument: Vocal
- Label: Trinity Optima Production

Mawar Eva de Jongh (born 26 September 2001) is an Indonesian actress, singer, and model. As an actress, Mawar started to become famous after playing a role as Annelies in the film Bumi Manusia (2019).

== Early life and education ==
Mawar was born on 26 September 2001 in Amsterdam, the Netherlands, as Mawar Eva de Jongh. She is the second of two children, born to Bastian Olivier de Jongh and Hartawati Gurusinga. Her father is of Dutch origin, while her mother is from the Karo. She has an older brother, Budi Floris de Jongh. When Mawar was three years old, her parents separated, causing her and Budi to move with their mother to her hometown in Medan, North Sumatra.

Mawar is an alumna of Methodist-1 Junior High School in Medan, North Sumatra. After beginning her career in Jakarta, she continued her education at Toga Terang Senior High School in Bekasi, West Java.

Since 2019, Mawar Eva de Jongh has been pursuing studies in Communication Science through a distance learning program at Pelita Harapan University.

== Career ==
=== 2007–2018: Early career and newcomer ===
Mawar won a modeling competition while she was in kindergarten. In 2007, she also appeared in the television film series Dongeng in the episodes “Putri Tidur & 3 Peri” and “Gadis Cantik & Buku Ajaib”.

Mawar won the Cardinal Award 2015 and placed second at Puteri Pariwisata Tanah Karo 2015. Her professional career began after she won Miss Celebrity Indonesia, which was broadcast on SCTV. Following this victory, she began receiving numerous offers for television films (FTV) and appeared in feature films produced by Screenplay Films, such as Promise and London Love Story 2. Throughout 2016, Mawar starred in three television soap operas: Elif Indonesia, Haji Belajar Ngaji, and Super Puber. The following year, she played the role of Rumi in the series Pesantren & Rock'N Roll: Reborn. In 2018, she took on a dual role in the soap opera Dia yang Tak Terlihat. Mawar also received her first leading roles in Tumbal: The Ritual and Serendipity, and it marked her first appearance in a horror film.

Mawar made her debut as a singer by collaborating with Julian Jacob on the song “Heartbeat” in late 2018. At the same time, she signed a contract with the record label Trinity Optima Production.

=== 2019–now: Widespread recognition ===
Mawar Eva de Jongh gained widespread recognition in 2019 for her role as Annelies Mellema in Bumi Manusia, a film adaptation of a novel by Pramoedya Ananta Toer. One month after the film's release, she released a single under the stage name Mawar de Jongh titled “Lebih Dari Egoku.” The single reached 2nd place on the Billboard Indonesia Top 100 chart. “Lebih Dari Egoku” was also nominated for Best of the Best Production, while Mawar herself received a nomination for Best Female Pop Solo Artist at the Anugerah Musik Indonesia 2020. She later starred in the film Sin, alongside Bryan Domani.

In the following year, Mawar starred in the film #TemanTapiMenikah2, portraying Ayudia Bing Slamet, a role that had previously been played by Vanesha Prescilla in the first film. Her performance once again received positive responses and earned her nominations for Selected Best Leading Actress at the 2020 Maya Awards and Commended Best Leading Actress at the Bandung Film Festival 2020. She also received nominations for Best and Favorite Leading Actress, as well as Best and Favorite On-Screen Couple alongside Adipati Dolken, at the Indonesian Movie Actors Awards 2021. Mawar released another single titled “Sedang Sayang Sayangnya,” which peaked again at 3rd place on the Billboard Indonesia Top 100 chart. In mid-2020, she starred in the Vidio original web series Loncat Kelas, opposite Fatih Unru. Throughout 2020, she released two cover singles: “Ruang Rindu,” originally by Letto, and “Tanya Hati,” originally by Pasto.

In 2021, Mawar released a pop ballad single titled “Mesin Waktu.” She then released her seventh single, “Pernah Salah,” written by Alam Urbach. Mawar stated that one of the challenges of performing the song was that there were many high notes. She later performed the single “Rumah yang Baru” together with Adikara Fardy, which was included in the soundtrack of the Rapijali series by Dee Lestari. Mawar was chosen by Dee because many Rapijali readers felt that her voice and physical appearance matched their long-held imagination of the character Ping. The song depicts Ping's journey from a village to the city, where she experiences homesickness, isolation, and alienation.

In 2022, Mawar portrayed the adult version of the character Ika in the film Miracle in Cell No. 7. She then appeared in several films in 2023, including Puisi Cinta yang Membunuh directed by Garin Nugroho, Virgo and the Sparklings, part of the Bumilangit Cinematic Universe, and the biographical film Buya Hamka directed by Fajar Bustomi.

=== Film ===
Year	Title	Role	Notes
2017	Promise	Salsabila	
2017	London Love Story 2	Elena	
2018	Tumbal: The Ritual	Nira	
2018	Serendipity	Rani	
2019	Bumi Manusia	Annelies Mellema	
2019	Warkop DKI Reborn 3	Annelies Mellema	Not credited
2019	Sin	Ametta Rinjani	
2020	#TemanTapiMenikah2	Ayudia Bing Slamet	
2022	Miracle in Cell No. 7	Adult Kartika	
2023	Puisi Cinta yang Membunuh	Ranum	
2023	Puisi Cinta yang Membunuh	Ranting	
2023	Para Betina Pengikut Iblis	Sumi	
2023	Virgo and the Sparklings	Carmine	
2023	Buya Hamka	Kulsum	
2023	Galaksi	Kejora Ayodhya	
2023	Malaikat Tanpa Sayap	Maya	
2024	Para Betina Pengikut Iblis Part 2	Sumi	
2024	The Shadow Strays	14	
2025	Semusim Setelah Kemarau	Kaldera	
2025	Tinggal Meninggal	Kerin	
2025	What's Up with Secretary Kim	Kim	
2025	Sampai Titik Terakhirmu	Shella Selpi Lizah	
2026	Ayah, Ini Arahnya Kemana, Ya?	Dira	
TBA	Lockdown: Pandemic Thriller †	Debby	
TBA	The Invisible Guest †		

Key
†	Denotes films that have not yet been released

- TBA : To be announced

=== Short films ===
Year	Title	Role	Notes
2019	Sin	Ametta Rinjani	Versi Rako Prijanto

=== Television series ===
Year	Title	Role	Notes
2007	Dongeng	Small Tania	Episode: Putri Tidur & 3 Peri
2007	Dongeng	Small Nina	Episode: Gadis Cantik & Buku Ajaib
2016	Elif Indonesia	Karlina	
2016	Haji Belajar Ngaji	Indah	
2016	Super Puber	Dania	
2017	Pesantren & Rock'N Roll: Reborn	Nanda	
2017	Pesantren & Rock'N Roll: Reborn	Rumi	
2018	Dia yang Tak Terlihat	Kania	
2018	Dia yang Tak Terlihat	Audy	

=== Web series ===
Year	Title	Role	Notes
2020	Loncat Kelas	Nadya Emeralda	
2021	Loncat Kelas 2	Nadya Emeralda	
2022	My Ice Girl	Adara Mahestri	
2023	Love Ice Cream	Irene	
2024	Nurut Apa Kata Mama	Mawar	Musim 2
2024	10 PM	Viska	
TBA	Rahasia Meede †	Cathleen Zwinckel	
TBA	Luka Makan Cinta †		

Key
†	Denotes films that have not yet been released

- TBA : To be announced

=== Television films ===
- Tukang Mie Kocok Pujaan Hati (2015) as Gina
- Nyanyian Cinta Si Ratu Kambing (2016)
- Cintaku tak Sedingin Es Cream (2016)
- Tanjidor Love Story (2017) as Rindu
- Diam-Diam Cinta (2017) as Mawar
- Neng Geulis Lisa Pujaan Kang Deden (2017) as Lilis/Lisa
- Cinderella Boy (2017) as Sisil
- Tukang Tutut Bikin Baper (2017) as Amel
- Pipi Merah Bu Dokter (2017) as Citra
- Food Truck-mu Mengalihkan Duniaku (2017)
- Ketampol Cinta Cewek Jengkol (2017) as Nadya
- Naga Cinta Neng Geulis (2017)
- Gerobak Cinta Mas Jo (2017) as Yasmin
- Mie Ayam Bumbu Rindu (2017) as Ghea
- Pacarku, Mantan Pacar Adikku (2017)
- Ondel-ondel Ganteng Narik Bajaj (2017) as Mae
- Cintaku Pendek Tapi Kece (2018) as Fey
- Biduan Es Serut Asoy (2018)
- Princess Cantik, Pangeran Sawah (2018) as Giska
- Mangga Rasa PDKT (2018)
- I Love You Dibalas I Love You Too (2019)
- Cewek Cantikku, Datang tak Dijemput, Pulang tak Diantar (2019)
- Cinta Abang Gulali Manisnya Bikin Diabetes (2019)

=== Stages ===
- Book Launch of the Poetry Collection “Melepas Kepergian” by Raka Sulistyo Bintang (2025)
- Musical concert “memeluk mimpi-mimpi” (Rena) (2024)

== Discography ==
=== Singles ===
Title	Year	Highest position	Album
Title	Year	IDN	Album
"Heartbeat" (with Julian Jacob)	2018	—	Non-album single
"Lebih dari Egoku"	2019	2	Non-album single
"Sedang Sayang-sayangnya"	2020	3	Non-album single
"Ruang Rindu"	2020	—	Non-album single
"Tanya Hati"	2020	—	Non-album single
"Mesin Waktu"	2021	—	Non-album single
"Pernah Salah"	2021	—	Non-album single
"Rumah yang Baru" (with Adikara Fardy and Dee Lestari)	2021	—	Rapijali: Book Soundtrack
"Tiba-tiba Hilang"	2022	—	Non-album single
"Berpuisi Cinta"	2023	—	OST. Puisi Cinta yang Membunuh
"Tak di Tanganku" (with Juicy Luicy)	2023	—	Non-album single
"Cinta Pertama dan Terakhir"	2023	—	Non-album single
"Cinta Aku Bisa Apa"	2023	—	Non-album single
"Bukan dengan Dia" (with Jaz)	2024	—	Non-album single
"Tinggal"	2025	—	Tinggal Meninggal (Original Motion Picture Soundtrack)

=== Albums ===
- De Jongh (2026)

== Awards and nominations ==
Year	Awards	Categories	Nominated works	Results
2020	Anugerah Musik Indonesia	Best of the Best Production Work	"Lebih dari Egoku"	Nominated
2020	Anugerah Musik Indonesia	Best Pop Female Solo Artist	"Lebih dari Egoku"	Nominated
2020	Bandung Film Festival	Commended Main Female Actress for Theatrical film	#TemantapiMenikah2	Nominated
2021	Maya Awards	Best Actress in a Leading Role	#TemantapiMenikah2	Nominated
2021	Indonesian Movie Actors Awards	Best Main Actress	#TemantapiMenikah2	Nominated
2021	Indonesian Movie Actors Awards	Favorite Main Actress	#TemantapiMenikah2	Nominated
2021	Indonesian Movie Actors Awards	Best On-Screen Couple (with Adipati Dolken)	#TemantapiMenikah2	Nominated
2021	Indonesian Movie Actors Awards	Favorite On-Screen Couple (with Adipati Dolken)	#TemantapiMenikah2	Nominated
2022	Indonesian Journalist Film Festival	Best Supporting Actress- Drama	Miracle in Cell No. 7	Nominated
2023	Indonesian Movie Actors Awards	Best Supporting Actress	Miracle in Cell No. 7	Won
2023	Indonesian Movie Actors Awards	Favorite Supporting Actress	Miracle in Cell No. 7	Won
2023	Bandung Film Festival	Commended Best Leading Actress – Web Series	My Ice Girl	Nominated
2023	Indonesian Journalist Film Festival	Best Supporting Actress - Action	Virgo and the Sparklings	Nominated
2025	Indonesian Journalist Film Festival	Best Leading Actress - Comedy	Tinggal Meninggal	Won
