= What's Up with Secretary Kim =

2025 Indonesian romantic comedy-drama film

What's Up With Secretary Kim
- Directed by: Rako Prijanto
- Based on: What's Wrong with Secretary Kim (2018 South Korean television series)
- Produced by: Frederica
- Starring: Mawar Eva de Jongh; Adipati Dolken; Dimas Beck
- Production company: Falcon Pictures
- Distributed by: Vidio
- Release date: November 8, 2025
- Country: Indonesia
- Language: Indonesian

What's Up With Secretary Kim is a 2025 Indonesian romantic comedy-drama film directed by Ralo Prijanto and produced by Falcon Pictures. The film stars Mawar Eva de Jongh, Adipati Dolken, and Dimas Beck. It is an official Indonesian adaptation of the 2018 South Korean television series What's Wrong with Secretary Kim. The film is scheduled to premiere exclusively on Vidio on November 8, 2025.

== Plot ==
Kimberley Laksono has worked for nine years as the loyal secretary to Rendra Prakasa, a vice president of a large retail company named Jambudwipa. When Kimberley unexpectedly decides to resign, Rendra begins to realize that he has deeper feelings for her. His efforts to win her back are further complicated by the return of his estranged older brother, Willy, who also harbors feelings for Kimberley.

== Cast ==
- Mawar Eva de Jongh as Kimberley Laksono
- Adipati Dolken as Rendra Prakasa
- Dimas Beck as Willy
- Agnes Naomi as Mandy

== Production ==
The film was developed by Falcon Pictures as part of its ongoing strategy to adapt successful Asian dramas for Indonesian audiences. It was directed by Rako Prijanto, who has previously worked on several major romantic films in Indonesia. Casting reunited Mawar Eva de Jongh and Adipati Dolken, who had previously starred together in other romantic titles.

== Release ==
What's Up With Secretary Kim is set for exclusive streaming release on Vidio on November 8, 2025.

== See also ==
- What's Wrong with Secretary Kim (original 2018 South Korean TV series)
- List of Indonesian films of 2025
