= The Raid (2011 film) =

Indonesian film by Gareth Evans

- Theatrical release poster
- Directed by: Gareth Evans
- Written by: Gareth Evans
- Produced by: Ario Sagantoro
- Starring: Iko Uwais; Joe Taslim; Donny Alamsyah; Yayan Ruhian; Pierre Gruno; Ray Sahetapy; Tegar Sathya
- Cinematography: Matt Flannery; Dimas Imam Subhono
- Edited by: Gareth Evans
- Music by: Fajar Yuskemal (Note: Original Indonesian version); Aria Prayogi; Mike Shinoda (Note: American version); Joseph Trapanese
- Production companies: PT Merantau Films; XYZ Films; Celluloid Nightmares
- Distributed by: PT Merantau Films (Indonesia)
- Release dates: 8 September 2011 (Toronto); 23 March 2012 (Indonesia & US); 22 March 2012 (Australia)
- Running time: 101 minutes
- Country: Indonesia
- Language: Indonesian
- Budget: $1.1 million
- Box office: $9.3 million

The Raid (released as The Raid: Redemption in the United States) is a 2011 Indonesian action thriller film written, edited, and directed by Welsh filmmaker Gareth Evans. The film stars Iko Uwais, Joe Taslim, Donny Alamsyah, Ray Sahetapy and Yayan Ruhian. The story follows an Indonesian National Police tactical squad that is deployed to raid a ruthless drug lord's apartment block in the slums of Jakarta, only to be encircled by the criminals, forcing them to fight their way through the complex.

After its world premiere at the Toronto International Film Festival (TIFF), The Raid received positive reviews from critics, who praised its cinematography, soundtrack and action sequences. The subtitle Redemption was added in the United States as distributor Sony Pictures Classics could not secure the rights to the title; it also allowed Evans to plan out future titles in the series. The American version of the film, released on DVD and Blu-ray on 14 August 2012, features a film score composed by Mike Shinoda and Joseph Trapanese.

A sequel titled The Raid 2 was released in 2014. Both films showcase the traditional Indonesian martial art of pencak silat, with fight choreography led by Uwais and Ruhian. A third film was considered, but the project was cancelled.

== Plot ==
Rama, a rookie MBC officer, joins a 20-man squad led by Sgt. Jaka and Lt. Wahyu on a raid to arrest crime lord Tama Riyadi. Together with his lieutenants Andi and Mad Dog, Tama controls an apartment block where criminals and addicts live under his protection. The officers enter undetected and clear the first few floors, but two lookouts spot them on the sixth floor. Wahyu shoots one, prompting the other to raise the alarm.

Tama summons reinforcements, who eliminate the officers guarding the building's exterior and destroy their SWAT vehicle. Taking advantage of the ensuing chaos, Tama's men retake the first five floors. Tama cuts the power and announces over the PA system that the remaining officers are trapped in the sixth-floor stairwell. Wahyu reveals that he arranged the mission to eliminate Tama, who has ties to corrupt police officials, including Wahyu himself. The operation is unauthorised, and no reinforcements are coming. Gunmen ambush the officers from above, killing nearly the entire squad.

The survivors retreat into an empty apartment, where armed thugs corner them. Rama cuts through the floor with an axe, allowing the team to descend into the apartment below. They struggle to repel their attackers, and officer Bowo is gravely wounded. Rama constructs an improvised explosive device using a propane tank and a refrigerator, killing the invading henchmen. With more reinforcements approaching, the survivors split up: Jaka, Wahyu and officer Dagu retreat to the fifth floor, while Rama takes Bowo upwards.

Rama and Bowo find refuge in the apartment of Gofar, a law-abiding tenant who reluctantly shelters them. A five-man gang armed with machetes searches the apartment but fails to discover the officers. After tending to Bowo's wounds, Rama leaves to find Jaka's group, fighting his way past the gang in a prolonged confrontation. On the sixth floor, he encounters Andi, who has killed two of Tama's men. Andi is revealed to be Rama's estranged elder brother. Rama joined the raid partly to find him, at their father's urging. Rama refuses to leave without his comrades, but Andi will not abandon his criminal life, and the brothers part ways.

Mad Dog discovers Jaka's group on the fourth floor. Wahyu flees, and Jaka orders Dagu to protect him. Mad Dog challenges Jaka to hand-to-hand combat and eventually kills him by breaking his neck. Meanwhile, Tama discovers Andi's betrayal through his surveillance cameras and attacks and incapacitates him.

Rama reunites with Dagu and Wahyu, and they head towards Tama's quarters on the 15th floor, fighting their way through a narcotics laboratory. When Rama discovers Mad Dog torturing Andi, he separates from the others to rescue his brother. Mad Dog allows Rama to free Andi before fighting them both. After a brutal confrontation, the brothers kill him.

Elsewhere, Wahyu and Dagu confront Tama. Wahyu kills Dagu and takes Tama hostage, but Tama reveals that he knew about the raid in advance. He explains that Wahyu's corrupt superior, Reza, has set him up and that Wahyu will be killed regardless. Panicking, Wahyu kills Tama and attempts suicide, only to discover that his gun is empty.

Andi uses his influence to secure the survivors' escape. He gives Rama recordings Tama made to blackmail corrupt officials and tells him to contact Bunawar. Rama asks Andi to return home, but Andi refuses, explaining that he can protect Rama in the criminal underworld, whereas Rama cannot protect him outside it. Rama, Bowo and Wahyu leave the building, while Andi returns to the apartment block with a smile.

== Cast ==
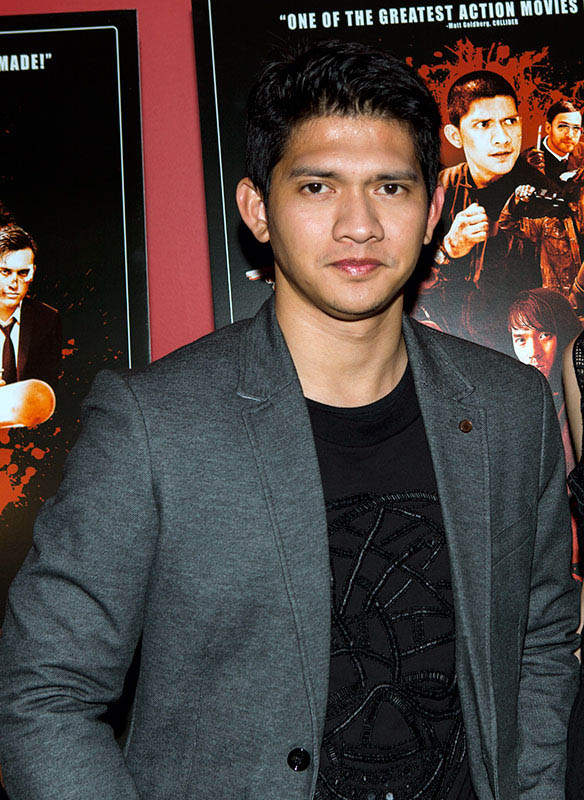
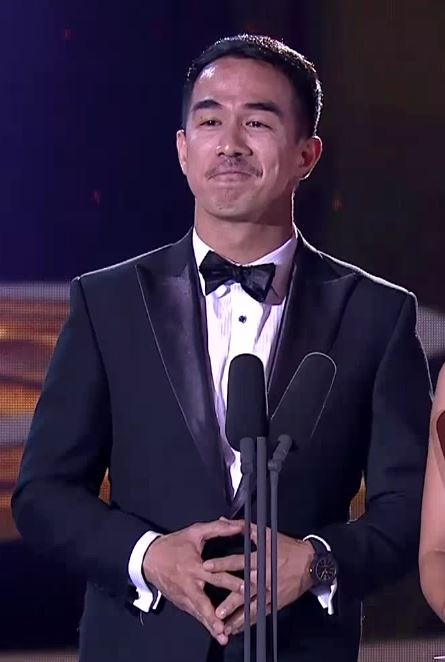
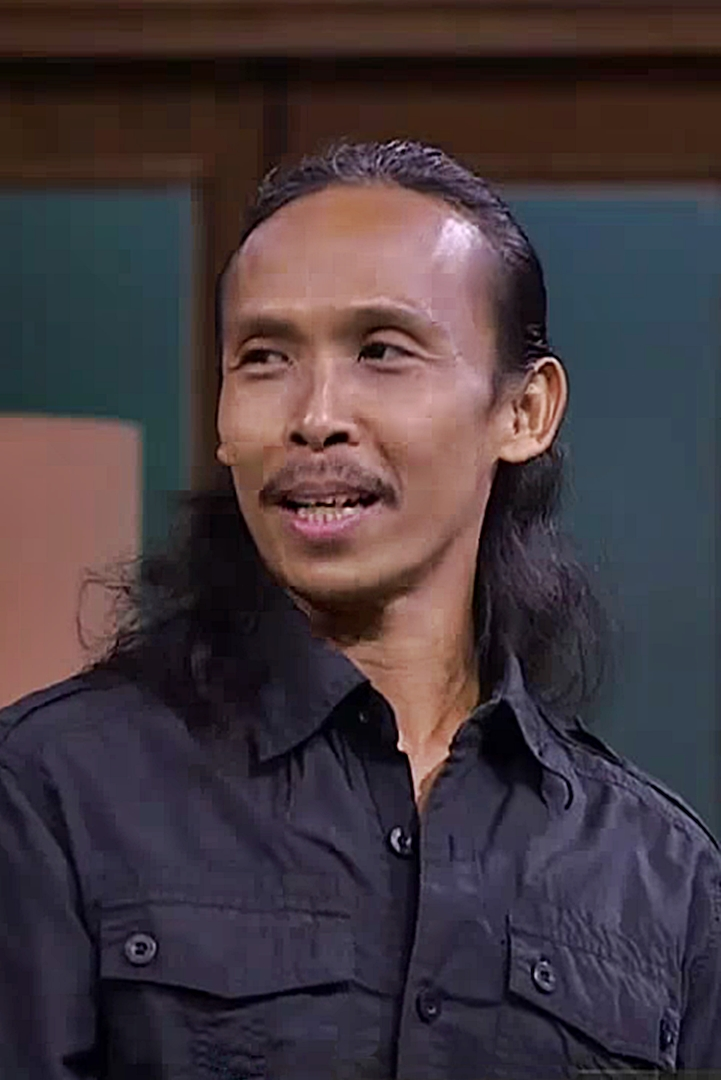
Iko Uwais, Joe Taslim and Yayan Ruhian portrayed Rama, Jaka and Mad Dog, respectively.
- Iko Uwais as Rama, one of the rookie members of the Mobile Brigade Corps squad tasked with raiding Tama's building. One of the few survivors of the raid. Uwais previously worked with Evans in Merantau. Having lived for four years in Indonesia and learned about the country's predominant religion, director Gareth Evans implicitly integrated the Muslim faith in Uwais' character.
- Joe Taslim as Jaka, the Sergeant who leads his unit into the raid. Having been a fan of Merantau, the former judo champion Taslim contacted Evans through Facebook for their next project. As Evans was browsing through Taslim's profile, he came across a photo of him in a SWAT uniform and felt that it resonated with the character. Evans had him undergo choreography and drama auditions, with Taslim earning the role having aced them both.
- Yayan Ruhian as Mad Dog, a skilled fighter who is the muscle behind Tama's operation. Ruhian previously worked with Evans in Merantau as an actor and fight choreographer. Evans cast Ruhian in the film as he wanted him to play a "purely evil" character, opposite to that which he played in his debut film which had a "redeemable value".
- Donny Alamsyah as Andi, Tama's consigliere who is also Rama's estranged elder brother. Alamsyah also played Uwais' character's brother in Merantau. Since he regretted not being able to do action scenes in Merantau, Alamsyah approached Evans as they prepared for The Raid, earning the role having aced the audition.
- Iang Darmawan as Gofar, a tenant of the building who tends to his ill wife. Prior to the film, Darmawan's acting credits had been in sketch comedies, and The Raid marks his transition to a serious role.
- Pierre Gruno as Wahyu, the Lieutenant who arranges the eponymous raid to take out Tama.
- Tegar Satrya as Bowo, the hothead member of the team who is wounded attempting to save the life of a teammate. One of the few survivors of the raid.
- Eka Rahmadia as Dagu, a skilled fighter and team member who protects Lt. Wahyu as they make their way towards Tama. A Taekwondo practitioner, Rahmadia is part of the Piranha Stunt Team who helped with the film's shooting.
- Alfridus Godfred as leader of the machete gang, a priest who hunts the surviving officers when Jaka and Rama split into two groups.
- Ray Sahetapy as Tama Riyadi, a ruthless drug lord who is the boss of the apartment building. Evans wanted a non-stereotypical take on the character, citing most gangster films wherein the boss is usually wearing a pristine suit and smoking cigars.

Other cast members include Henky Solaiman and Fikha Effendi, who play Rama's father and wife, respectively. Verdi Solaiman, Ananda George and Yusuf Opilus appear as officers Budi, Ari and Alee, respectively.

== Production ==
=== Development and pre-production ===
Initially intended to be released as Serbuan Maut, which translates literally to "The Deadly Raid"; director Gareth Evans came across the idea for the film when he moved to Indonesia to film a documentary about the country's martial art pencak silat, as suggested by his wife of Indonesian Japanese descent. It was in that country that he met Iko Uwais, a Silat practitioner who was then working as a delivery man for a phone company based in Jakarta. Evans then nudged his wife to cast Uwais for Merantau, and then in The Raid.

Following Merantau, Evans and his producers began work on a Silat film project called Berandal (Indonesian for Thugs), a large-scale prison gangster film intended to star not only Merantau actors Uwais and Yayan Ruhian but also an additional pair of international fight stars. A teaser trailer was shot, but the project proved more complex and time-consuming than anticipated. After a year and a half, Evans and the producers found themselves with insufficient funds to produce Berandal, so they changed the film to a simpler but different story with a smaller budget. They called the project Serbuan Maut (The Raid). Producer Ario Sagantoro considers the film to be lighter than Merantau. Evans also considers it to be "a lot more streamlined," stating that "Merantau is more of a drama" while The Raid is more of a "survival horror film." Evans wanted The Raid vastly different from Merantau in terms of pacing. With Merantau, some fans complained the action sequences took too long to appear since the first 45 minutes of the film laid emphasis on character development, backdrop (specifically, the Indonesian culture) and drama. Therefore, Evans designed The Raid to be a "full-on" action film.

Pre-production took about four months, which include finalization of the script (which included translation of the original English-language script into Indonesian) and the work on choreography for the fighting sequences, which were designed by Iko Uwais and Yayan Ruhian. The actors that make up the key members of the police squad were sent to bootcamp military training with KOPASKA, where they learned how to use weapons, and how to perform strategic attack and defense techniques.

=== Filming ===
The crew wanted The Raid to be shot in a quasi-documentary style, that is, the camera is handheld and without the use of Steadicam. To achieve that objective, they shot the film in high definition using Panasonic AF100 camcorder—which had just recently come out of the market—and strayed from using film format while shooting most action and fight sequences. In addition, the camera was frequently attached to a Fig Rig to prevent most scenes from being too jarring, and give the camera operator opportunities to change angles and positions rapidly.

All guns used in the film were Airsoft replicas, to avoid the costs associated with having to deal with firearms. All the shots of the guns' actions cycling, muzzle flashes and cases ejecting were added digitally.

=== Editing ===
When filming concluded, about 120 minutes of footage was shot; Evans originally intended it to be eighty to eighty-five minutes long. The footage was eventually cut down to approximately 100 minutes. The final stages of post-production took place in Bangkok, Thailand for the color grading and audio mixing processes.

=== Soundtrack ===
While the film was still in production, in May 2011, Mike Shinoda and Joseph Trapanese were tasked to create a new score for the American release. The film premiered at the 2011 Toronto International Film Festival with the original score from the Indonesian version which was composed by Aria Prayogi and Fajar Yuskemal, who also composed Evans's previous film Merantau. The Raid made its debut in the US with Trapanese and Shinoda's version at Sundance 2012.

Shinoda stated that his score was over 50 minutes and almost all instrumental. After film production, he had room for two more songs, but did not want to sing or rap, so he posted pictures of two music artists. Deftones/††† frontman Chino Moreno guest performed "RAZORS.OUT", which was leaked online on 16 March 2012, as rap group Get Busy Committee performed "SUICIDE MUSIC" for the film.

== Release ==
The film was marketed internationally through Celluloid Nightmares, a partnership between US-based XYZ Films and France's Celluloid Dreams.

Sony Pictures Worldwide Acquisitions (under their Sony Pictures Classics label in association with Stage 6 Films) acquired the film's distribution rights for the United States, Latin America and Spain, revised the film score, and changed the title to The Raid: Redemption for the US release. Distribution rights to other countries were sold to Kadokawa Pictures for Japan, Koch Media for Germany, Alliance Films for Canada, Momentum Pictures for the United Kingdom, Madman Entertainment for Australia, SND HGC for China, and Calinos Films for Turkey. Deals were also made with distributors from Russia, Scandinavia, Benelux, Iceland, Italy, South Korea and India, during the film screening at the TIFF.

== Reception ==
=== Box office ===
In Indonesia, the film sold 1,844,817 tickets at the box office in 2012.

Overseas, in its Sony Pictures Classics debut in the United States on 23–25 March 2012, The Raid: Redemption grossed $220,937 from 24 theaters for a location average of $15,781. For its widest opening release weekend in the United States and Canada on 13–15 April 2012, the film grossed $961,454 from 881 theaters, and ranked 11th overall. In the United Kingdom, the film grossed $660,910 on its opening weekend. In Indonesia, approximately 250,000 people watched the film in the first four days of release, and it was considered a great turnout for a country that only has about 660 cinemas nationwide. As of 8 July 2012, the film has grossed $4,105,123 in North America. The film grossed approximately $9.3 million overseas outside of Indonesia.

=== Home media ===
In the United States, the film grossed $10.1 million on DVD and Blu-ray, as of April 2022.

In the United Kingdom, it was 2012's fifth-best-selling foreign-language film on physical home video formats. It was later the UK's overall best-selling foreign-language film of 2013 on home video.

=== Critical response ===
On Rotten Tomatoes, the film has an approval rating of 87% based on reviews from 175 critics, with an average score of 7.60/10. The website's consensus reads, "No frills and all thrills, The Raid: Redemption is an inventive action film expertly paced and edited for maximum entertainment." On Metacritic, the film has a weighted average score of 73 out of 100 based on reviews from 31 critics, indicating "generally favorable reviews".

Peter Bradshaw of The Guardian gave the film 5 out of 5 and said, "This violent, intense and brilliant bulletfest from Indonesia puts western action movies to shame." Bilge Ebiri of Vulture.com wrote, "Once the action starts—and it starts very quickly—The Raid is relentless, breathtaking in its sheer propulsive majesty. But it's also shot through with moments of bleak poetry amid the carnage." Robert Koehler of Variety praised the director, writing, "Taking the genre to a higher level of intensity, the Welsh-born Evans continues what he started in previous Indonesia-set actioner 'Merantau,' but this picture will seal his cult status." Michael Phillips of the Chicago Tribune wrote, "The Raid is maniacal in its pacing and assault tactics. It's also, absurdly, rated R. Fantastic. I love that a film this gory secured the same Motion Picture Association of America rating as The King's Speech." Owen Gleiberman of Entertainment Weekly called it "fists of fury mixed with torture porn," noting the variety of gory action sequences but criticizing the incoherent narrative. He gave it a B− grade.

Roger Ebert of the Chicago Sun-Times gave the film one star out of four; he criticized the lack of character depth, and noted, "the Welsh director, Gareth Evans, knows there's a fanboy audience for his formula, in which special effects amp up the mayhem in senseless carnage." Ebert was criticized for his assessment, and later published a defense of his review.

In 2025, it was one of the films voted for the "Readers' Choice" edition of The New York Times' list of "The 100 Best Movies of the 21st Century", finishing at number 307.

== Accolades ==
The film received numerous awards and nominations from both local and international institutions. At the 2012 Maya Awards, the film received 10 nominations. The Raid did not receive any nominations at the 2012 Citra Awards; which was considered a snub.

List of accolades received by The Raid
Award	Date	Category	Recipients	Result	Ref.
Toronto International Film Festival	8 September 2011	Midnight Madness – People's Choice Award	The Raid	Won	
Dublin International Film Festival	28 February 2012	Best Film	The Raid	Won	
Dublin International Film Festival	28 February 2012	Audience Award	The Raid	Won	
SXSW Film Festival	17 March 2012	Festival Favorites – Audience Award	The Raid	Nominated	
Festival Mauvais Genre	9 April 2012	Prix du Public	The Raid	Won	
Imagine Film Festival	30 April 2012	Silver Scream Award	The Raid	Won	
Maya Awards	15 December 2012	Best Feature Film	The Raid	Nominated	
Maya Awards	15 December 2012	Best Director	Gareth Evans	Nominated	
Maya Awards	15 December 2012	Best Supporting Actor	Ray Sahetapy	Nominated	
Maya Awards	15 December 2012	Best Cinematography	Matt Flannery	Nominated	
Maya Awards	15 December 2012	Best Editing	Gareth Evans	Won	
Maya Awards	15 December 2012	Best Special Effects	Andi Novianto	Nominated	
Maya Awards	15 December 2012	Best Art Direction	Timothy D. Setianto	Nominated	
Maya Awards	15 December 2012	Best Make-Up & Hairstyling	Jerry Oktavianus	Nominated	
Maya Awards	15 December 2012	Best Sound Design	Aria Prayogi and Fajar Yuskemal	Nominated	
Maya Awards	15 December 2012	Best Promotional Poster Design	The Raid	Nominated	
Indiana Film Journalists Association	17 December 2012	Best Foreign Language Film	The Raid	Won	
IGN Awards	21 December 2012	Best Action Movie	The Raid	Nominated	
North Carolina Film Critics Association	15 January 2013	Best Foreign Language Film	The Raid	Nominated	
NAACP Image Awards	1 February 2013	Best International Motion Picture	The Raid	Nominated	
Australian Film Critics Association	23 February 2013	Best International Film – Foreign Language	The Raid	Nominated	
Empire Awards	24 March 2013	Best Thriller	The Raid	Nominated	
Indonesian Movie Awards	27 May 2013	Best Supporting Actor	Yayan Ruhian	Won	
Indonesian Movie Awards	27 May 2013	Best Supporting Actor	Ray Sahetapy	Nominated	
Indonesian Movie Awards	27 May 2013	Best Chemistry	Iko Uwais and Donny Alamsyah	Nominated	
Indonesian Movie Awards	27 May 2013	Favourite Film	The Raid	Nominated	

== Sequel and remake ==
=== Sequel ===
While developing The Raid in script form, Evans started to toy around with the idea of creating a link between it and his initial project, Berandal. It was later confirmed that Berandal would serve as a sequel to The Raid. Evans has also stated his intention to make a trilogy. Sony pre-bought the US, Latin American and Spanish rights to the sequel. Alliance/Momentum bought the rights to the United Kingdom and Canada; Koch Media acquired the film for German-speaking territories; Korea Screen acquired the rights to Korea; and HGC acquired the rights to China. Deals for other major territories were also in negotiations. Subtitled Berandal for the Indonesian market and simply The Raid 2 for the US and English-speaking market, the sequel had a "significantly larger" budget than its predecessor, and its filming included approximately 100 days of shooting. Pre-production began in September 2012 while filming began in January 2013.

On the release of The Raid 2 in 2015, Evans said he had ideas for The Raid 3 but that nothing had been written yet and a third film was not likely to happen before 2018 or 2019. In a 21 November 2016 interview with Impact Online, director Evans revealed the sequel was on hold with the franchise likely having ended, stating "Moving back to UK felt like a closing chapter on that franchise—we ended the story pretty neatly (I feel) in Part 2. I'm aware there's an interest for it [...] So never say never, but it's unlikely to happen anytime soon." In September 2018 Evans again stated that he felt the story was complete and that a third film was highly unlikely.

=== American remake ===
A few months after Sony acquired the film's North American distribution rights, it was announced by The Hollywood Reporter that its subsidiary company, Screen Gems, had begun negotiations to produce a Hollywood remake. The deal was completed in November 2011, with writer-director Gareth Evans to serve as an executive producer of the remake. XYZ Films, executive producers on the original Indonesian version, will be producers on the American version. Screen Gems also wants the same choreographers from the original film involved with the remake. On 21 February 2014, the studio picked Patrick Hughes to direct the remake. A day later, reports stated that both Chris and Liam Hemsworth were being eyed for roles by the studio. On 27 May 2014, Variety reported that the film's production was delayed until early 2015. On 13 June 2014, Frank Grillo was the first to be announced to star in the remake, while announcing that he is a fan of the original film. On 16 June 2014, Geek Tyrant revealed that the remake will be set in the near future. On 4 August 2014, TheWrap reported that Taylor Kitsch has been cast in the lead role, and also that XYZ Films is returning to produce the remake, which is expected to hew closely to the original film. On 22 August 2014, Hughes described his remake as being in the vein of Black Hawk Down and Zero Dark Thirty with 12 integral roles. According to Tracking Board, on 23 October 2015, both Screen Gems and Kitsch had dropped out of the project and Hughes also dropped out as director. In February 2017, XYZ Films revealed that Joe Carnahan will produce and direct the remake with Evans as a producer. On 10 January 2022, Deadline reported that the remake will premiere on Netflix with Patrick Hughes directing alongside Michael Bay producing and Evans executive producing.

== Comics and animation ==
A graphic novel based on The Raid was released on 21 May 2012 in Indonesia.

A stop-motion short film depicting the plot of The Raid with clay-animated cats, made by Lee Hardcastle released on 11 May 2012, was included in the film's home media release as one of the special features. A flash animated teaser trailer spoof depicting The Raid as a '90s anime, made by Philip Askins released on 19 May 2012, was also included in the film's home media release as one of the special features.

On 22 June 2016, The Hollywood Reporter announced Titan Comics had teamed up with Gareth Evans and XYZ Films for a comic book spin-off series featuring "original stories featuring characters from The Raid movie series" with a launch date expected for late 2016.

== See also ==
- Dredd, an UK/South African film with a similar premise; although released the same year as The Raid, Dredd started production earlier.
- BuyBust, a 2018 Philippine film with a similar premise.
