= Lovely Man =

- Film poster
- Directed by: Teddy Soeriaatmadja
- Written by: Teddy Soeriaatmadja
- Produced by: Indra Tamoron Musu
- Starring: Donny Damara; Raihaanun; Yayu Unru; Ari Syarif; Lani Sonda
- Cinematography: Ical Tanjung
- Music by: Bobby Surjadi
- Production company: Karuna Pictures
- Release dates: 7 October 2011 (Busan); 10 May 2012 (Indonesia)
- Running time: 76 minutes
- Country: Indonesia
- Language: Indonesian

Lovely Man is a 2011 Indonesian film written and directed by Teddy Soeriaatmadja. The film had its world premiere at the 2011 Busan International Film Festival to positive reviews on the segment "A Window on Asian Cinema". Donny Damara plays the starring role as Syaiful/Ipuy, a transgender woman in Jakarta. Actress Raihaanun plays the female lead role as Cahaya, Syaiful's long-lost 19-year-old daughter who comes to the city to look for him and learns that her father is a transgender woman. This is their second film together after 2007 remake of drama Badai Pasti Berlalu.

The film generated controversy in its native Indonesia due to rejections from the Islamic Defenders Front but saw overwhelming reception abroad through screenings at various international film festivals.

== Plot ==
Lovely Man tells the story of Cahaya, a 19-year-old girl with strong Islamic values, who discovers that her long-lost father, Syaiful/Ipuy, is a transgender woman working on the streets of Jakarta. The narrative unfolds over the course of one night as they walk through Jakarta, illustrating how their encounter changes their lives as they learn about love, loss, and redemption.

Cahaya arrives in Jakarta from what can be assumed to be her small-town home just as the sun is setting. Armed with a piece of notepaper and a few rupiah, she is in the city searching for the father she hasn't seen since she was four. Asking neighbors and shopkeepers in the area where he lives for Syaiful elicits blank stares in return. When they finally realize she means Ipuy, they point her in the right direction and say he is "working" around Taman Lawang, Jakarta's infamous spot for transgender sex workers. Naturally, Cahaya goes looking for an office building or store.

When she locates Ipuy (Damara), she finds a transvestite prostitute plying her trade on the streets. In the initial moments after their encounter, both are shocked by the turn of events. The innocent Cahaya is devastated by her father's choices, while Ipuy is horrified to see the daughter he willfully left behind.

== Cast ==
- Donny Damara as Syaiful/Ipuy, Cahaya's transgender father
- Raihaanun as Cahaya, a devout 19-year old Muslim girl
- Yayu Unru
- Ari Syarif
- Lani Sonda

== Production ==
=== Development ===
Soeriaatmadja first came up with an idea for the film in 2003, when he saw a transgender woman and a veiled woman talking on the side of a street. He started development on the script in 2011. During script development, Raihaanun, who is Soeriaatmadja's wife, expressed interest in the film. As a result, Soeriaatmadja rewrote the character of Cahaya for her.

The film was made with a very small budget, which director Soeriaatmadja referred to as the "survival technique".

== Release ==
The film had its world premiere at the 2011 Busan International Film Festival in the segment "A Window on Asian Cinema." The segment also screened Ari Sihasale's Serdadu Kumbang and Salaman Aristo's Jakarta Maghrib.

In October 2013, it was screened for the London Indonesian Film Screenings at the London University School of African and Oriental Studies (SOAS). Other films screened were Paul Agusta's Parts of the Heart, Eugene Panji's Cita-Citaku Setinggi Tanah, Rahung Nasution's Mentawai Tattoo Revival, Yosep Anggi Noen's Peculiar Vacation and Other Illnesses, and Riri Riza's three features: Kuldesak, 3 Hari untuk Selamanya, and Atambua 39 Celsius.

Initially, Soeriaatmadja did not have plans to release the film because he was concerned about a possible controversy revolving around a scene in the film where Cahaya takes off her veil. However, after participating in the Q! Film Festival, the film garnered attention in the Indonesian LGBT community. Nevertheless, its release garnered controversy due to rejections from the Islamic Defenders Front. The film still saw limited release in several theaters throughout the country on May 10, 2012.

The film was screened at the following film festivals:

- Official Selection of the 2011 Mumbai Film Festival, India
- Official Selection of the 2011 World Film Festival of Bangkok, Thailand
- Official Selection of the 2011 Hong Kong International Film Festival
- In Competition at the 2011 Asiatica Filmmediale, Rome, Italy
- In Competition at the 2011 Bangalore International Film Festival, India
- In Competition at the 2011 New Delhi Digital Film Festival, India
- In Competition at the 2011 Torino LGBT Film Festival, Italy
- In Competition at the 2012 Indonesian Film Festival, Yogyakarta, Indonesia
- In Competition at the 2012 Tel Aviv International LGBT Film Festival, Israel
- In Competition at the 2012 Osaka Asian Film Festival, Japan
- In Competition at the 2012 Tiburon International Film Festival, California, United States
- 2011 Jogja-Netpac Asia Film Festival, Yogyakarta, Indonesia
- 2011 Hua Hin Film Festival, Bangkok, Thailand
- 2011 Q! Film Festival, Jakarta, Indonesia
- 2011 CinemAsia Film Festival, Amsterdam, Netherlands
- 2012 Melbourne Indonesian Film Festival, Victoria, Australia
- 2012 Palm Springs International Film Festival, California, United States
- Closing Film at the 2012 Balinale International Film Festival, Bali, Indonesia
- Opening Film at the 2013 Indonesian Film Mini Festival, Washington D. C., United States

== Reception ==
In a positive review, Elizabeth Kerr of The Hollywood Reporter also singled out Damara's performance, calling it "Damara's show" while adding that "with his square jaw and heavy brow, Damara jettisons excessive mannerisms for little details (playing with his eyelashes, fidgeting with his wig) and stays respectful of Ipuy. He uses words as weapons and comports himself in a way that makes clear the status transgender people hold in the world. When he finally relates to Cahaya as Saiful, his ruggedly handsome features carry a melancholy that speaks to what happens after the film is over. Ipuy is in trouble with some local gangsters and after he sends Cahaya home with a promise never to contact him again, it's clear how the story truly ends."

Los Angeles Times film critic Betsy Sharkey praised Soeriaatmadja's work, calling it "a moving one-act play on human connections and the power of love and forgiveness to change lives".

Indonesian film critic Adrian Jonathan Pasaribu highlighted Soeriaatmadja's bravery in depicting the relationship between a transgender woman and a devout Muslim woman. He further noted that the film does not overcrowd itself with social context, instead letting the viewers make their own conclusions about transgender people and Muslims. Pasaribu also praised Soeriaatmadja's minimalist direction, calling it his best directorial work so far.

== Accolades ==
The film received many awards and nominations, both domestic and international. Donny Damara received rave reviews for his performance as Syaiful/Ipul, resulting in a Best Actor accolade from Maya Awards, Asian Film Awards, and the Indonesian Oscar-equivalent Citra Awards. The film has been credited for reviving Damara's career as a film actor.

Year	Award	Category	Nominee(s)	Result
2012	Asian Film Awards	Best Director	Teddy Soeriaatmadja	Nominated
2012	Asian Film Awards	Best Actor	Donny Damara	Won
2012	Asian Film Awards	People's Choice Award for Favorite Actor	Donny Damara	Nominated
2012	Tel Aviv International LGBT Film Festival	Best Film	Lovely Man	Won
2012	Osaka Asian Film Festival	Special Mention Award	Lovely Man	Won
2012	Tiburon International Film Festival	Best Film	Lovely Man	Won
2012	Tiburon International Film Festival	Best Director	Teddy Soeriaatmadja	Won
2012	Indonesian Movie Awards	People's Choice Award for Favorite Film	Lovely Man	Nominated
2012	Indonesian Movie Awards	Best Actor	Donny Damara	Won
2012	Indonesian Movie Awards	Best Actress	Raihaanun	Won
2012	Indonesian Movie Awards	Best On-Screen Duo	Donny Damara Raihaanun	Nominated
2012	Indonesian Movie Awards	People's Choice Award for Favorite Actor	Donny Damara	Nominated
2012	Indonesian Movie Awards	People's Choice Award for Favorite Actress	Raihaanun	Nominated
2012	Citra Awards of Indonesian Film Festival	Best Film	Lovely Man	Nominated
2012	Citra Awards of Indonesian Film Festival	Best Director	Teddy Soeriaatmadja	Nominated
2012	Citra Awards of Indonesian Film Festival	Best Actor	Donny Damara	Won
2012	Citra Awards of Indonesian Film Festival	Best Screenplay	Teddy Soeriaatmadja	Nominated
2012	Citra Awards of Indonesian Film Festival	Best Editing	Wahyu Ichandiardono	Nominated
2012	Citra Awards of Indonesian Film Festival	Best Art Direction	Richard Sibuea	Nominated
2012	Citra Awards of Indonesian Film Festival	Best Original Story	Teddy Soeriaatmadja	Nominated
2012	Maya Awards	Best Feature Film	Lovely Man	Won
2012	Maya Awards	Best Director	Teddy Soeriaatmadja	Won
2012	Maya Awards	Best Actor in a Leading Role	Donny Damara	Won
2012	Maya Awards	Best Actress in a Leading Role	Raihaanun	Nominated
2012	Maya Awards	Best Screenplay	Teddy Soeriaatmadja	Won
2012	Maya Awards	Best Costume Design	Ve Verdinand	Nominated
2012	Maya Awards	Best Makeup & Hairstyling	Ebba Syeba	Nominated
2012	Maya Awards	Best Sound Design	Khikmawan Santosa	Nominated
