= Malaikat Tanpa Sayap =

- Poster film
- Directed by: Rako Prijanto
- Produced by: Chand Parwez Servia
- Starring: Adipati Dolken; Maudy Ayunda; Surya Saputra; Agus Kuncoro; Kinaryosih; Geccha Qheagaveta; Ikang Fawzi
- Music by: Tya Subiakto
- Distributed by: Kharisma Starvision Plus
- Release date: 9 February 2012
- Running time: 104 minutes
- Country: Indonesia
- Language: Indonesian

Malaikat Tanpa Sayap (English translation: Angel Without Wings), is an Indonesian drama film which was released on 9 February 2012, directed by Rako Prijanto. The film stars Maudy Ayunda, Adipati Koesmadji, Ikang Fawzi, Surya Saputra, Agus Kuncoro, and Kinaryosih.

== Cast ==
- Maudy Ayunda as Mura
- Adipati Koesmadji as Vino
- Ikang Fawzi as Levrand
- Surya Saputra as Amir
- Agus Kuncoro as Calo
- Kinaryosih as Mirna
- Geccha Qheagaveta as Wina

== Awards and nominations ==
Year	Award	Category	Recipients	Result
2012	Festival Film Bandung	Best Female Leading Role	Maudy Ayunda	Nominated
2012	Festival Film Bandung	Best Male Supporting Role	Surya Saputra	Won
2012	Festival Film Bandung	Best Artistic Director	Kumpul ATR	Nominated
2012	Maya Awards	Best Theme Song	Dewi Lestari – "Malaikat Juga Tahu" (Malaikat Tanpa Sayap)	Nominated
2012	Maya Awards	Best Film Review	Arief Kurnia Pujoputanto, for "Malaikat Tanpa Sayap"	Nominated
