= The Witness (2012 film) =

- Theatrical poster
- Directed by: Muhammad Yusuf
- Written by: Bebi Hasibuan
- Produced by: Sarjono Sutrisno; Jose Mari Abacan; Annette Gozon-Abrogar; Rofino Dwinanto
- Starring: Gwen Zamora; Pierre Gruno; Agung Saga; Kimberly Ryder; Marcellino Lefrandt; Feby Febiola
- Cinematography: Joel Zola
- Edited by: Aziz Natandra
- Music by: Izzal Peterson
- Production companies: GMA Films; Skylar Pictures
- Distributed by: GMA Films (Philippines)
- Release dates: March 21, 2012 (Philippines); April 26, 2012 (Indonesia)
- Countries: Indonesia; Philippines
- Languages: English; Filipino; Indonesian
- Box office: ₱90,000,000.00

The Witness is a 2012 Indonesian–Filipino horror action film directed by Muhammad Yusuf. The film stars Gwen Zamora, Pierre Gruno, Agung Saga, Kimberly Ryder, Marcellino Lefrandt, and Feby Febiola.

== Plot ==
Angel Williams is an assistant manager of a Hotel who has just moved from Manila to Jakarta to be with her ex-patriate family. She is haunted by a recurring dream about a young man committing suicide.

One day, her family is slaughtered, leaving no one alive. Her parents, her only sister Safara, her maid, and security, are all dead. She is also chased down and shot by the killer but somehow she manages to survive, having a vivid memory of what the killer looked like, but not knowing who he is.

Angel begins seeing apparitions of her sister and sees visions of events that led to her family's deaths. A detective investigates the tragedy but believes Angel's experiences are just her psyche acting out. Angel decides to follow the trail her sister's apparitions lead her to and discover who her sister has become in the past few years, with the trail leading straight to the killer himself.

== Cast ==
- Gwen Zamora as Angel Williams
- Pierre Gruno as Satria Datta
- Agung Saga as Aris 'Ais' Mahandra Datta
- Kimberly Ryder as Safara Williams
- Marcellino Lefrandt as Detective Indra
- Feby Febiola as Celine
- Nigel Ryder as Aldo Williams

== Music ==
The main theme for The Witness is "Before I Die" by Pika Airplay and Izzal Peterson. In the film it serves as the single that Aris' band had just released, with Agung Saga singing to Airplay's vocals. It is used both as an in-story musical number, as well as incidental music, given that half of the song is a ballad which ceases and crashes into a heavier, more emotional instrumental, which is also used for the song's ending track. A promotional version sung by Derrick Monasterio was released for promotional purposes.

Another song by Izzal Peterson and Pika Airplay is "Aurora" which serves as Aira and Safara's happier love theme.
