= Tanah Surga... Katanya =

2012 film by Herwin Novianto

- Film poster
- Directed by: Herwin Novianto
- Written by: Danial Rifki
- Produced by: Bustal Nawawi
- Starring: Osa Aji Santoso; Fuad Idris; Ence Bagus; Astri Nurdin; Tissa Biani Azzahra; Ringgo Agus Rahman; Andre Dimas Apri
- Cinematography: Anggi Frisca
- Production companies: PT Demi Gisela Citra Sinema; Brajamusti Films
- Release date: August 15, 2012
- Running time: 90 minutes
- Country: Indonesia
- Language: Indonesian

Tanah Surga... Katanya (Paradise's Land... They Say) is a 2012 Indonesian drama film directed by Herwin Novianto. The film won four awards at the Indonesian Film Festival in 2012, including Best Feature Film.

== Accolades ==
Award	Year	Category	Recipient	Result
Indonesian Film Festival	2012	Best Film	Bustal Nawawi	Won
Indonesian Film Festival	2012	Best Director	Herwin Novianto	Won
Indonesian Film Festival	2012	Best Original Screenplay	Danial Rifki	Won
Indonesian Film Festival	2012	Best Cinematographer	Anggi Frisca	Nominated
Indonesian Film Festival	2012	Best Art Director	Ezra Tampubolon	Won
Indonesian Film Festival	2012	Best Sound Editing & Mixing	Adityawan Susanto	Nominated
