= Persona (2012 film) =

Indonesian documentary

Persona is a 2012 documentary film written and directed by George Arif. It follows the life story of actress Rita Matu Mona, an influential figure in the Indonesian stage scene. The film was nominated for Best Documentary Film in the 1st Annual Maya Awards, and was also nominated in the 2013 Denpasar Film Festival.

The film has been watched by more than 60.000 viewers during its roadshow screenings around Indonesia and the Philippines.
