= Maudy Ayunda =

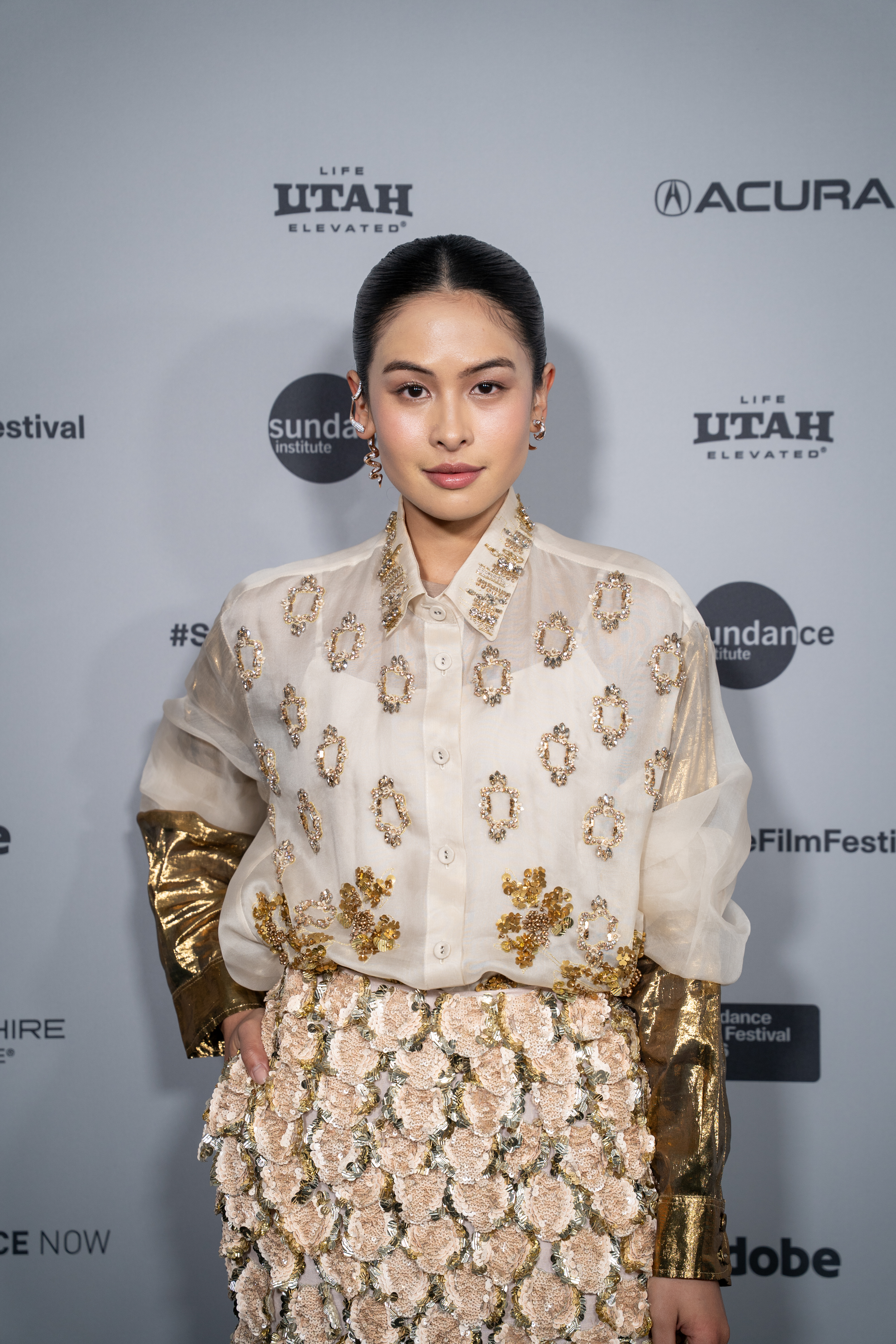
- Ayunda in 2026
- Born: Ayunda Faza Maudya; 19 December 1994 (age 31); Jakarta, Indonesia
- Education: St Hilda's College, Oxford (BA); Stanford University (MA) (MBA)
- Occupations: Actor, singer, songwriter, entrepreneur, author
- Years active: 2005–present
- Organization(s): Mod Media Collective, Maudy Ayunda Foundation, From This Island
- Title: Co-founder and CEO of From This Island
- Spouse: Jesse Choi (m. 2022)
- Musical career
- Genres: Pop
- Label: Trinity Optima Production

Ayunda Faza Maudya, commonly known as Maudy Ayunda (born 19 December 1994) is an Indonesian actress, singer-songwriter, entrepreneur, and author.

Ayunda made her debut in the entertainment industry through the film "Untuk Rena" in 2005. After finding success as a child actress, Maudy gained further recognition for her female lead roles in "Perahu Kertas" (2022), "Refrain" (2013), and "Habibie & Ainun 3" (2019).

In addition to her acting career, Ayunda also maintains a musical career. She released her first album "Panggil Aku…", featuring the single "Tiba-tiba Cinta Datang", in 2011. Ayunda has released four studio albums and has featured in numerous film soundtracks.

Also known for her advocacy in various social issues, particularly education and youth empowerment, Ayunda has been involved in initiatives that promote access to education and foster impactful ripples for Indonesia.

Her work has garnered various accolades, including a spot on Forbes Asia 30 Under 30, double nominations at the Indonesian Film Festival (FFI), and multiple nominations at the Anugerah Music Indonesia (AMI).

== Early life and education ==
Maudy Ayunda was born Ayunda Faza Maudya on 19 December 1994, in Jakarta, Indonesia. She is the eldest daughter of Didit Jasmedi R. Irawan and Muren Murdjoko. Her younger sister, Amanda Khairunnisa, is an influencer and has also appeared in several films.

From an early age, Ayunda showed an interest in books and education. She began learning to read at the age of 3, with her first word being "Kompas," the name of a household newspaper at that time. As an introverted child, she was often found quietly reading in a corner during family gatherings. In a podcast interview, Maudy described education as her safe space and personal refuge, saying, "I always feel like this [education] is a space that’s totally mine and under my control. Whether I succeed or fail, I can take full credit and accountability for it."

Ayunda attended Al-Azhar until her second grade before transferring to Mentari Intercultural School. She admitted that the transition was challenging, as she was the only student in her class unfamiliar with an English-speaking environment. She recalled how the headmaster once warned her and her mother that she might have to repeat a grade due to her limited English skills. However, she completed her studies at Mentari, graduating from junior high school. She then continued her education at the British School Jakarta, where she also became the head of the student council.

After graduating from high school in 2011, she took a gap year, despite being accepted to Columbia University. The following year, Ayunda resumed her academic journey by pursuing a bachelor's degree in Philosophy, Politics, and Economics (PPE) at the University of Oxford and graduated with an honors equivalent to Magna Cum Laude. In 2019, she was accepted into both Harvard and Stanford for her master's degree, ultimately choosing Stanford, where she earned a dual degree in education (MA) and business administration (MBA).

== Career ==
=== 2005–2010: Career beginnings ===
Ayunda began her career in the entertainment industry as a child actress with her debut in the 2005 film Untuk Rena, where she starred alongside Indonesian senior actor, Surya Saputra. She was scouted at school by Miles Productions and was directly cast in the lead role as Rena. With this debut role, Ayunda was nominated for MTV Indonesia Movie Awards 2006 for Most Favorite Rising Star and received an award for Best Actress in a Leading Role at the Jakarta Film Festival. At 11 years old, Ayunda published her first book, A Forest of Fables, a collection of 17 short stories about forest animals. The proceeds were donated to the victims of the 2004 Aceh tsunami.

In 2009, Ayunda reunited with Miles Films, portraying Zakiah Nurmala, in Sang Pemimpi, the sequel to Laskar Pelangi, directed by Riri Riza. In addition to her acting role, she also contributed to the movie's soundtrack by singing Mengejar Mimpi. Later that year, Ayunda became a finalist in a competition for the Indonesian magazine GADIS.

=== 2011–2014: Debut album ===
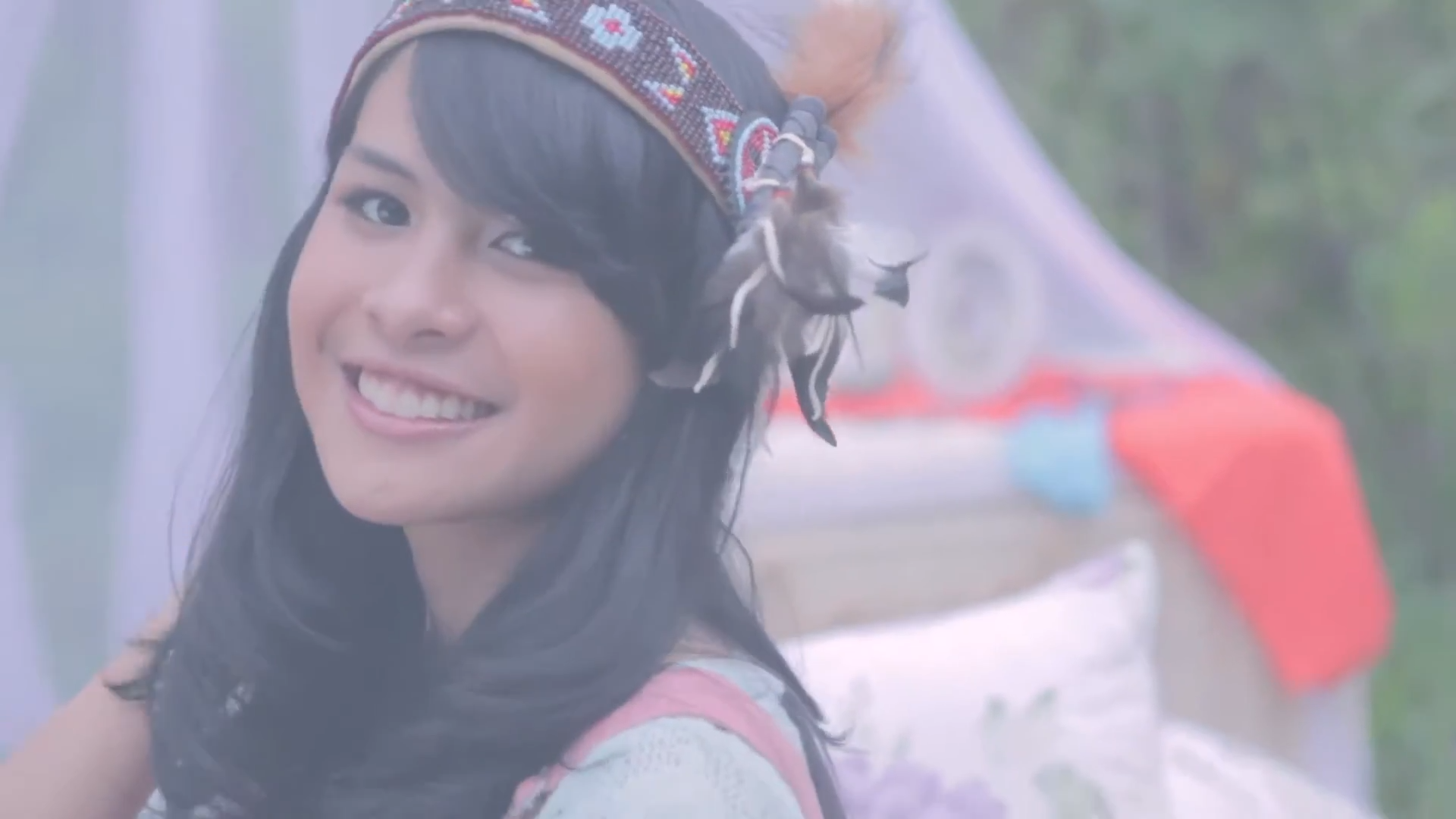
Maudy Ayunda in her music video, "Loveable"

After her debut in the film industry, Ayunda ventured into singing and performance. In 2011, she released her first music album, Panggil Aku…, which featured 10 songs, including Ayunda's first self-written track, Tetap Bersama, as well as the song Tiba-tiba Cinta Datang. The song was used as the opening theme for a 2014 rom-com teenage soap opera of the same name.

In addition to pursuing her musical journey, Ayunda continued to build her acting career. She starred in Rumah Tanpa Jendela, a musical film directed by Aditya Gumay, as well as in Tendangan dari Langit, a sports-themed movie. The following year, Ayunda reunited with Surya Saputra in Malaikat Tanpa Sayap, where she portrayed Mura, the love interest of Vino, played by Adipati Dolken. She was nominated in this role for Best Actress in Leading Role in Bandung Film Festival.

Shortly after, Ayunda and Adipati rejoined on set for the film adaptation of Perahu Kertas, a best-selling novel written by Dee (Dewi Lestari). In this movie, Ayunda landed her iconic role as Kugy, and also contributed as a singer for the original soundtrack, Perahu Kertas, which was also written by Dewi Lestari. She was nominated in the 2013 Indonesian Music Awards for the categories of Best Newcomer and Best Original Soundtrack Production. Ayunda was also nominated in the 2013 Planet Muzik Awards held in Singapore as Best Female Artist and Best Indonesian Song for the song "Perahu Kertas".

In 2013, Ayunda released a mini album titled My Hidden Collection on her YouTube channel, featuring four English songs, all of which she wrote herself. In January 2014, she collaborated with Korean-American singer David Choi on a duet titled By My Side. This song was later included in her 2014 album and went on to be nominated for Best Pop Collaboration at the 2015 Indonesian Music Awards.

=== 2015–2017: Moments (New Projects and Global Exposure) ===
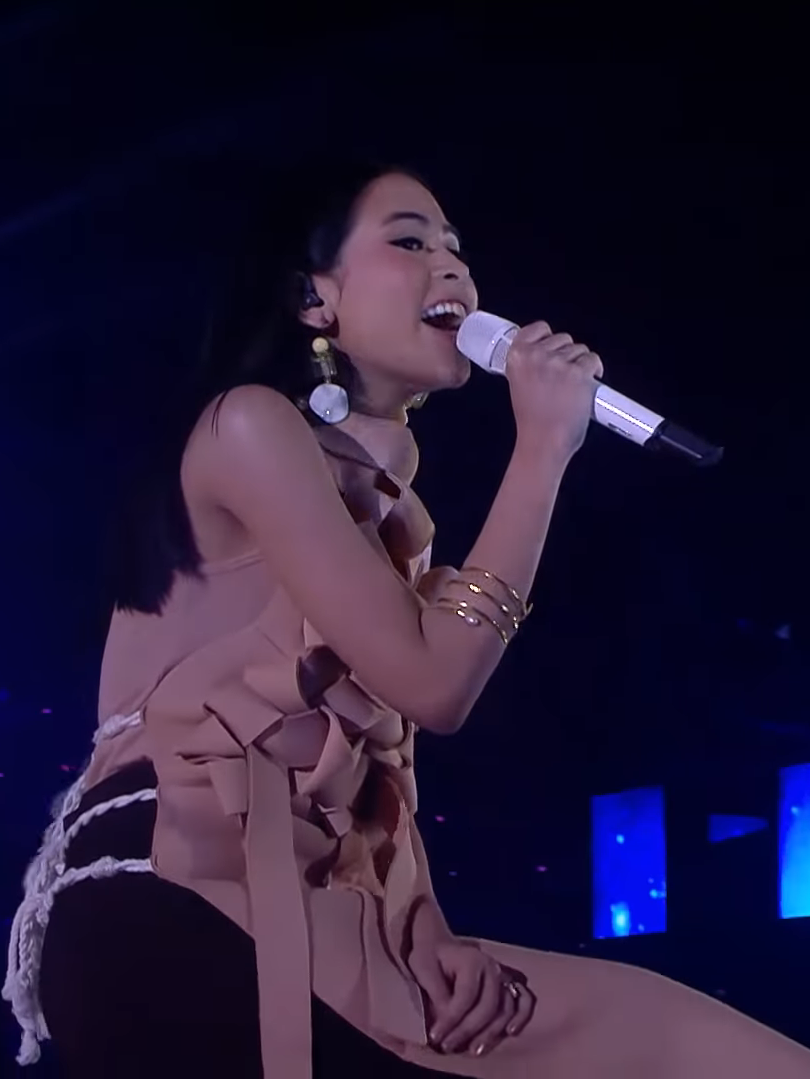
Maudy Ayunda performing in 2017

On 1 April 2015, Maudy released her second studio album titled Moments. The album sold over 200,000 copies and earned a Multi-Platinum certification. It also received nominations for Best Pop Album and Best Album at the 2015 Anugerah Musik Indonesia. Along with the album, she released three singles: "Cinta Datang Terlambat", "Bayangkan Rasakan" and "Untuk Apa"

In the same year, Ayunda appeared in 2014: Siapa di Atas Presiden, an action film directed by Hanung Bramantyo, and lent her voice to the animated movie Battle of Surabaya. She also released another self-written single Jakarta Ramai, and was nominated for Social Media Icon at the 2015 Anugerah Planet Muzik. Additionally, she won Female Singer of the Year at the 2015 Indonesian Choice Awards.

While managing her final year at Oxford in 2016, Ayunda successfully released the single Sekali Lagi and was also chosen to perform the official Indonesian version of "How Far I’ll Go" from Disney's animated film Moana.

In 2017, Ayunda starred as a travel blogger named Trinity in the film Trinity, The Nekad Traveler, directed by Rizal Mantovani. She also contributed to the movie's soundtrack with the song Satu Bintang di Langit Kelam, a piece originally performed by Rida Sita Dewi. That year, Ayunda also released the singles Kejar Mimpi and Kutunggu Kabarmu.

=== 2018–2020: Oxygen ===
In 2018, Ayunda released her third studio album, Oxygen. The album was later nominated as the Best Pop Album in the 2018 Anugerah Musik Indonesia award (AMI) with Ayunda herself being nominated as the Best Pop Female Artist for her single "Aku Sedang Mencintaimu" and Best Collaborative Production Work for her single "We Don’t (Still Water)" featuring Teddy Adhitya. Ayunda was also involved in the 2018 Asian Para Games, singing the theme song of the event "Song of Victory" alongside other musicians.

Ayunda published Dear Tomorrow: Notes to My Future Self that delves into her thoughts and experiences about authenticity, dreams, career, love and mindsets. The book sold over 27,000 copies.

In 2019, Ayunda published two bilingual children's books titled Kina's Story – Kina and Her Fluffy Bunny and Kina's Story: Kina Makes a New Friend. The stories were first written when Ayunda was 10 years old, which then got reimagined into new narratives.

In that same year, Ayunda was cast to play the role of Hasri Ainun Habibie in the Habibie Ainun 3 movie, directed by Hanung Bramantyo. In addition to her role in front of the camera, Ayunda was also involved in singing the soundtrack "Kamu & Kenangan", written by Melly Goeslaw. The song was nominated for Anugerah Music Indonesia (AMI) Award's Best Original Soundtrack Production Work and Piala Maya's Chosen Soundtrack. Additionally, Ayunda was also nominated for her role as Ainun at the 2020 Bandung Film Festival.

Amidst the rise of her creative works in 2020, Ayunda decided to pursue a master's degree in the United States. To mark this journey, she released a single called "Goodbye". In that same year, Ayunda was included in Forbes Indonesia's 30 Under 30 list.

=== 2021–2022: Losmen Bu Broto and The Hidden Tapes: Vol. 1 ===
Upon her return to Indonesia, Ayunda was cast in Losmen Bu Broto, playing as Jeng Sri. She also wrote and performed the soundtrack, collaborating with Danilla Riyadi. Directed by Ifa Isfansyah and Eddi Cahyono, the movie was released in 2021 and led to several nominations for Ayunda including her first Piala Citra nominations in the 2022 Indonesia Film Festival (FFI): Best Supporting Female Character for her role as Jeng Sri and Best Theme Song Creator for the song "Semakin Jauh" which she sang together with Danilla.

In addition to film, Ayunda also released her mini album The Hidden Tapes: Vol 1 in 2021. Through this mini album that she prepared throughout her time in Stanford University, Ayunda aimed to produce a work that is honest and true to herself. The mini album features three songs, each one telling different stories with one umbrella theme: women who accept, confront and empower. The idea came from her reflections on her career as a singer-songwriter after graduating.

The first song "Don’t Know Why" was released in July 2021, deep diving into the feelings of numbness in relationships, which serves as a reminder for women to recognise their capability in redefining their own paths and love stories. The second song "Not for Us", released in August 2021", is a realisation that there are relationships that can't last forever and that it is an inevitable thing. The final song "Heartless" was released in October 2021, voicing women's strength and their ability to write and own their stories.

Aside from her mini album, Ayunda also collaborated with Dee Lestari on a song titled "Awal Mula", which is the soundtrack for Dee Lestari's novel Rapijali.

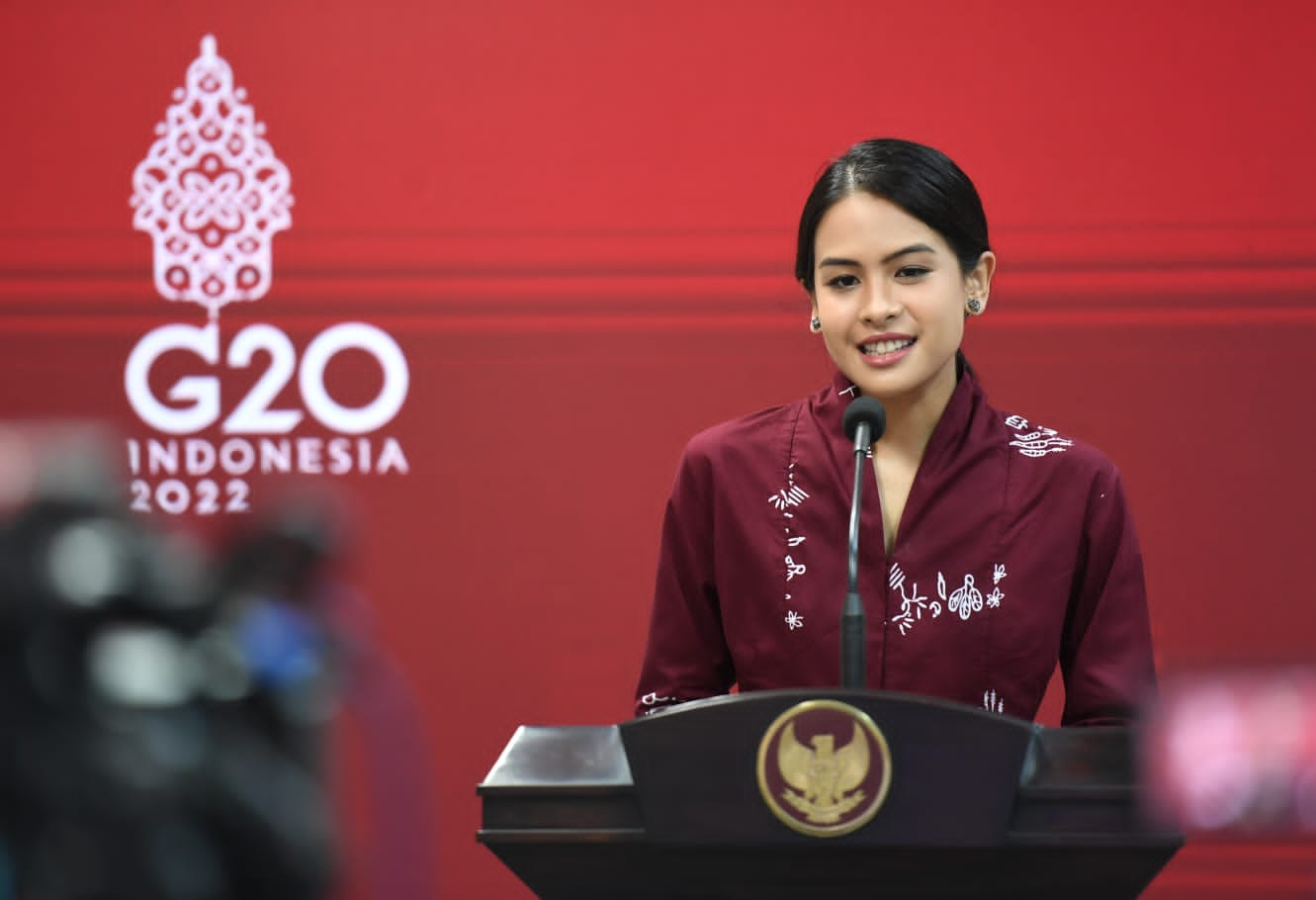
Maudy Ayunda as Spokesperson for Indonesia's G20 Presidency in 2022

In 2021, Ayunda received recognition and was included in Forbes Asia's 30 Under 30 – Entertainment and Sports.

Aside from her creative pursuits, Ayunda is also committed to her advocacy work. In 2022, Ayunda was appointed as the Spokesperson for the G20 Indonesia Presidency. This decision came as an effort to represent more Indonesian youths on global platforms. Throughout the presidency, Ayunda participated in several discussions focused on education, women and youth empowerment and sustainable development, reinforcing the importance of young people's voices in the decision-making processes.

In 2022, Ayunda expanded her digital presence and connected with a broader audience through her YouTube channel. Blending entertainment and educational content, Ayunda uses this channel to encourage dialogues among her viewers. The channel offers multiple programs such as Booklist (a book review series), Ayunda's thoughts (discussions about important issues), Buka Kartu (a spin on Q&A podcast) and vlogs (glimpses of her daily and work life).

=== 2023–present: From This Island & Pada Suatu Hari ===
In 2023, Ayunda brought back her Mentorship & Scholarship Program in full force. Established in 2018 as part of her foundation, the program aims to empower Indonesian youths and create a community of passionate change-makers that can create impactful ripples for Indonesia. With 32 people in the cohort, Ayunda held a series of workshops dissecting the topics of Mindset for Success, Strategic Storytelling, Building Mental Resilience, Productivity Tools and Frameworks and many more. In addition to the mentoring, Ayunda also offered tuition and project scholarships to selected mentees in hopes of creating that ripple effect in their respective spaces.

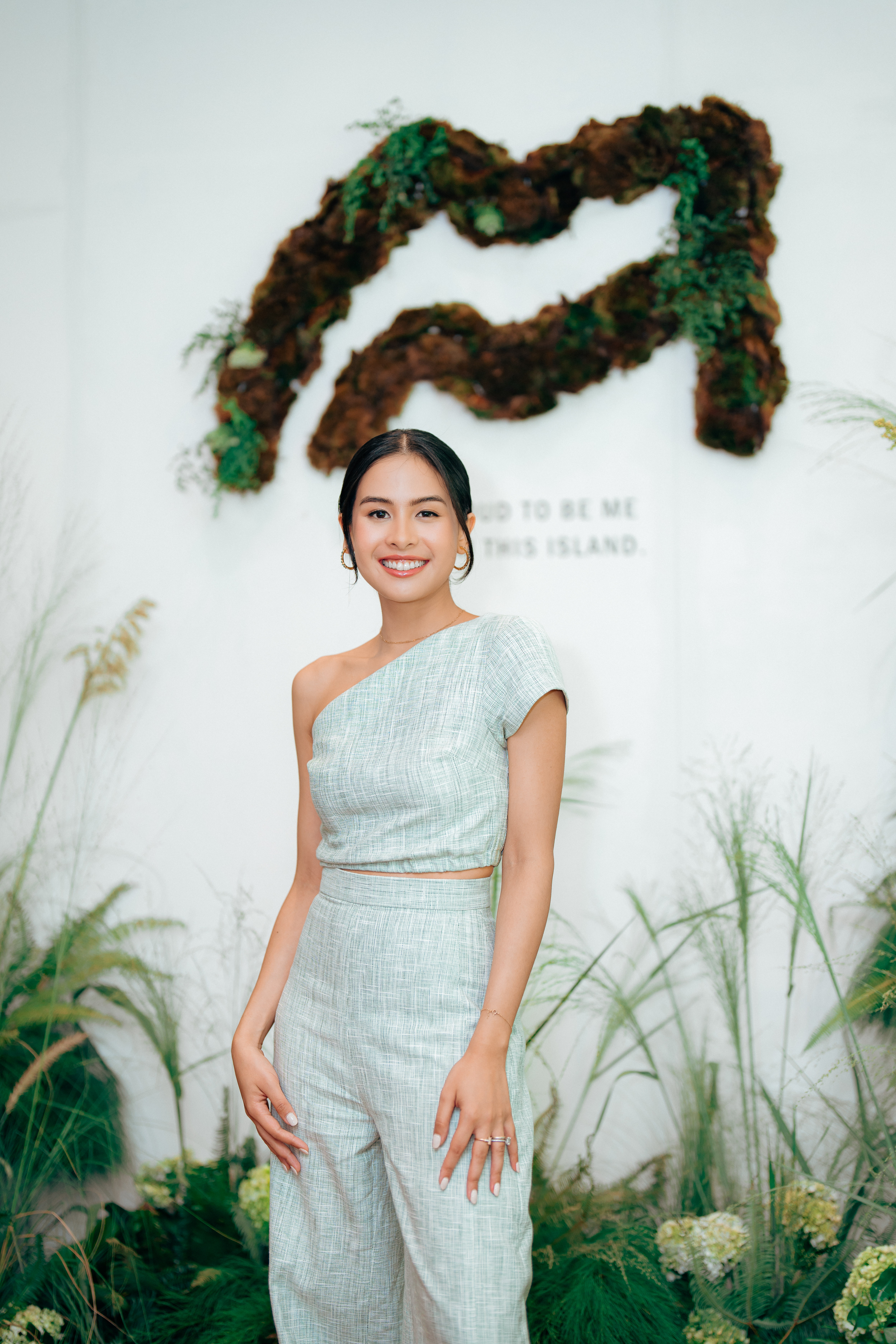
Maudy Ayunda launched her skincare brand in 2023

Ayunda ended the year with the launch of her business venture: From This Island, a personal care company that harnesses superfoods and hero ingredients from the islands of Indonesia, the world's largest archipelago. Equipped with a patented technology, LUMERA, Ayunda and her partner Patricia Davina aim to create a skincare experience that is effective, safe and powerful and brings Indonesia's name to a global scale.

Ayunda released her 4th studio album, "Pada Suatu Hari" in 2024. This upcoming album signifies Maudy's comeback to the music scene and a shift in her musical perspective where she not only views music as entertainment but also as a powerful medium for storytelling and social commentary.

In May 2024, Ayunda released a single called "Cahaya" as a surprise wedding anniversary gift for her husband, Jesse Choi.

Three months later, in August 2024, Ayunda released her second single titled "Hari Itu". The song touches on the memorable moments in school (first day, first heartbreak, friendships) and encapsulates the bittersweetness of nostalgia. The song became a huge hit, particularly among college students as they embark on their new chapter of school.

In November 2024, Ayunda released her third and final single from the album, "Puisi Kota", a duet song with the legendary Indonesian singer, Iwan Fals. Composed by Maudy Ayunda herself, "Puisi Kota" captures the complexities and inner turmoil of navigating the emotional landscapes of self-discovery, societal pressures and the search for meaning in an increasingly chaotic and noisy world.

In addition to music, Ayunda is also making a comeback to the film industry with her new role as Laksmi in "Para Perasuk", a supernatural drama directed by Wregas Bhanuteja, set to release in 2025. Exploring a new role in the film industry, the biopic of "Ki Hadjar Dewantara" will be Maudy's first film as a Producer. Directed by Gina S. Noer, the movie will dig deep into the life of Indonesia's Father of Education. The movie will be released in 2026.

In February 2025, Ayunda released the official soundtrack for the upcoming Korean film You're the Apple of My Eye. Starring Dahyun (Twice) and Jinyoung (B1A4), the movie is a high school love story and a remake of the renowned Taiwanese romance film of the same name. The soundtrack, titled Now Do You, marks a historic moment as the first Korean movie OST performed by an Indonesian singer.

== Personal life ==
Ayunda married Jesse Choi, a Korean-American entrepreneur and investor, in May 2022. She met Choi while pursuing her master's degree at Stanford Graduate School of Business. Choi has been residing in Indonesia since late 2021.

== Activism ==
In 2012, Ayunda was the youngest speaker at a global economic and democracy forum held in Nusa Dua, Bali. The international event was attended by former Indonesian president Susilo Bambang Yudhoyono. Ayunda spoke about economic development as a means to combat poverty in Indonesia.

In 2015, she accompanied the prime minister of the United Kingdom, David Cameron, during his visit to Jakarta. Ayunda, who at that time was also studying Politic, philosophy, and Economic at the University of Oxford was recognized for her activism and given the opportunity to guide the prime minister during this event. Acting as a young Indonesian representative, she accompanied the prime minister through a mix of activities—from serious discussions about Indonesia's extremist movement to snapping a selfie while enjoying the country's delicious banana fritters.

In 2016, Ayunda was listed as an Inspirational Woman of Indonesia by the Ministry of Women's Empowerment and Child Protection. and was recognized as the "Most Influential Millennial" by I Fashion Festival due to her positive engagement on social media and her collaboration with CIMB Niaga for the "Kejar Mimpi" movement. The movement was initiated by Ayunda in 2017, launched in collaboration with CIMB Niaga as part of their Corporate social responsibility (CSR) program. The movement inspired popular song with the same name, 'Kejar Mimpi'.

In March 2022, Maudy Ayunda was appointed as the spokesperson for the Indonesian government during its presidency of the G20 summit, which took place in Bali in November 2022. Johnny G. Plate, the chairman of Media and Communication for the G20 Presidency and the Indonesian minister of Communication and Information, explained that Ayunda's role aimed to enhance communication between the government and the public regarding the G20 events.

== Discography ==
=== Studio albums ===
Title	Album details	Sales	Certifications
Panggil Aku... (Call Me...)	Released: 11 August 2011; Label: Trinity Optima Production; Formats: CD, digital download	—N/a	—N/a
Moments	Released: 1 April 2015; Label: Trinity Optima Production; Formats: CD, digital download	200,000+	ASIRI: Multi Platinum
Oxygen	Released: 15 February 2018; Label: Trinity Optima Production; Formats: CD, digital download	TBA	TBA
Pada Suatu Hari	Released: 3 December 2024; Label: Trinity Optima Production; Formats: digital download	–	–

=== Soundtrack album contributions ===
Movie	Song	Song details
Perahu Kertas	"Perahu Kertas" (with Various Artists)	Released: 16 August 2012; Label: Trinity Optima Production; Formats: CD, digital download
Habibie & Ainun 3	"Kamu & Kenangan"	Released: 24 June 2019; Label: Trinity Optima Production & MD Music; Formats: Digital download
Losmen Bu Broto	"Pulang"	Released: 18 November 2021; Label: Trinity Optima Production; Formats: Digital download
Moana	"Seb'rapa Jauh Ku Melangkah"	Released: 9 November 2016; Label: Walt Disney Studio Indonesia; Formats: Digital
You're The Apple of My Eye (Korean version)	"Now Do You"	Released: 5 February 2025; Label: Most Contents; Formats: Digital
Para Perasuk (Levitating)	"Aku Yang Engkau Cari" "Di Tepi Lamunan"	Released: 19 January 2026; Label: Trinity Optima Production; Formats: Digital

=== Singles ===
Title	Year	Album
"Aku Atau Temanmu"	2011	Panggil Aku...
"Tiba-Tiba Cinta Datang"	2011	Panggil Aku...
"Perahu Kertas"	2012	Perahu Kertas
"Tahu Diri"	2012	Perahu Kertas 2
"Cinta Datang Terlambat"	2013	Refrain
"By My Side" (featuring David Choi)	2014	Moments
"Bayangkan Rasakan"	2014	Moments
"Untuk Apa"	2015	Moments
"Sekali Lagi"	2015	Moments
"Jakarta Ramai"	2016	Oxygen
"Seberapa Jauh Ku Melangkah"	2016	Moana (Indonesian version)
"Satu Bintang di Langit Kelam"	2018	Oxygen
"Kejar Mimpi"	2018	Non-album single
"Kutunggu Kabarmu"	2018	Oxygen
"Aku Sedang Mencintaimu"	2019	Aku Sedang Mencintaimu Piano Version
"Don't Know Why"	2021	The Hidden Tapes: Vol. 1
"Heartless"	2021	The Hidden Tapes: Vol. 1
"Not For Us"	2021	The Hidden Tapes: Vol. 1
"Cahaya"	2024	Pada Suatu Hari
"Hari Itu"	2024	Pada Suatu Hari
"Puisi Kota" (ft. Iwan Fals)	2024	Pada Suatu Hari
"Bulan, Bawa Aku Pulang"	2025	Pada Suatu Hari
"Yogyakarta"	2025	Non-album Single
"Aku Yang Engkau Cari"	2026	Para Perasuk (Levitating)
"Di Tepi Lamunan"	2026	Para Perasuk (Levitating)

== Filmography ==
Year	Title	Role	Director(s)	Notes
2005	Untuk Rena (Dear Rena)	Rena	Riri Riza	Lead role
2009	Sang Pemimpi (The Dreamer)	Zakiah Nurmala	Riri Riza	Supporting role
2011	Rumah Tanpa Jendela (A House without a Window)	Andini	Aditya Gumay	Supporting role
2011	Tendangan dari Langit (Kick from the Sky)	Indah	Hanung Bramantyo	Supporting role
2012	Malaikat Tanpa Sayap (Angel without Wings)	Mura	Rako Prijanto	Lead role
2012	Perahu Kertas (Paper Boat)	Kugy	Hanung Bramantyo	Lead role
2012	Perahu Kertas 2 (Paper Boat 2)	Kugy	Hanung Bramantyo	Lead role
2013	Refrain	Niki	Fajar Nugros	Lead role
2015	2014	Laras	Rahabi Mandra, Hanung Bramantyo	Supporting role
2015	Battle of Surabaya	Yumna	Aryanto Yuniawan	Voice over
2016	Rudy Habibie	—N/a	Hanung Bramantyo	
2017	Trinity The Nekad Traveler	Trinity	Rizal Mantovani	Lead role
2019	Trinity Traveler	Trinity	Rizal Mantovani	Lead role
2019	Habibie & Ainun 3	Ainun	Hanung Bramantyo	Lead role
2021	Losmen Bu Broto	Jeng Sri	Ifa Isfansyah & Eddie Cahyono	Supporting role
2026	Levitating	Laksmi	Wregas Bhanuteja	Lead role

== Publications ==
=== Books ===
Title	Year	Notes	Ref.
A Forest of Fables	2005	Children's fairy tales	
Dear Tomorrow	2018	In English	
Kina's Story: Kina and Her Fluffy Bunny	2019	Children Storybook Bilingual: Indonesian & English	
Kina's Story: Kina Makes a New Friend	2019	Children Storybook Bilingual: Indonesian & English	

== Awards and nominations ==
Year	Awards	Category	Recipient	Result
2006	MTV Indonesia Movie Awards	Most Favorite Rising Star	Untuk Rena	Nominated
2006	Jakarta Film Festival	Best Female Leading Role	Untuk Rena	Won
2012	Dahsyatnya Awards	Outstanding Newcomer	Maudy Ayunda	Nominated
2012	Bandung Film Festival	Best Female Leading Role	Malaikat Tanpa Sayap	Nominated
2012	Maya Awards	Best Theme Song	"Perahu Kertas"	Won
2013	Indonesian Music Awards	Best Original Soundtrack Production Work	"Perahu Kertas"	Nominated
2013	Indonesian Music Awards	Best of the Best Newcomer	"Perahu Kertas"	Nominated
2013	Indonesian Movie Awards	Favorite Soundtrack	"Perahu Kertas" (from Perahu Kertas film)	Nominated
2013	Planet Muzic Awards	Best Artist (Female)	"Perahu Kertas"	Nominated
2013	Planet Muzic Awards	Best Song (Indonesia)	"Perahu Kertas"	Nominated
2013	Yahoo! OMG Awards	Most Wanted Female	Maudy Ayunda	Nominated
2013	Yahoo! OMG Awards	Rising Star of the Year	Maudy Ayunda	Nominated
2014	SCTV Music Awards	Most Famous Female Solo Singer	Maudy Ayunda	Nominated
2015	Dahsyatnya Awards	Outstanding Female Solo Singer	Maudy Ayunda	Nominated
2015	Dahsyatnya Awards	Outstanding Video Clip Director	"Bayangkan Rasakan"	Nominated
2015	Indonesian Choice Awards	Female Singer of the Year	Maudy Ayunda	Won
2015	Selebrita Awards	Inspiring Celeb	Maudy Ayunda	Nominated
2015	Indonesian Music Awards	Best Pop Female Solo Artist	"Bayangkan Rasakan"	Nominated
2015	Indonesian Music Awards	Best Mix Engineer	"Bayangkan Rasakan"	Nominated
2015	Indonesian Music Awards	Best Pop Collaboration	"By My Side" (featuring David Choi)	Nominated
2015	Indonesian Music Awards	Best Pop Album	Moments	Nominated
2015	Indonesian Music Awards	Best Recording Album Producer	Moments	Nominated
2015	Indonesian Music Awards	Best of the Best Album	Moments	Nominated
2015	Planet Music Awards	Social Media Icon	Maudy Ayunda	Nominated
2015	Mom & Kids Awards	Favorite Female Singer	Maudy Ayunda	Nominated
2015	I Fashion Festival	Lifestyle Award in Education	Maudy Ayunda	Won
2015	Hai Reader's Poll Music Awards	The Best Female	Maudy Ayunda	Nominated
2016	Dahsyatnya Awards	Outstanding Female Solo Singer	Maudy Ayunda	Nominated
2016	Dahsyatnya Awards	Outstanding Video Clip	"Untuk Apa"	Nominated
2016	Dahsyatnya Awards	Outstanding Video Clip Director	"Untuk Apa"	Nominated
2016	Pop Awards	Smart Pop Awards	Maudy Ayunda	Nominated
2016	SCTV Music Awards	Most Famous Video Clip	"Untuk Apa"	Nominated
2016	Indonesian Choice Awards	Female Singer of the Year	Maudy Ayunda	Nominated
2017	Dahsyatnya Awards	Outstanding Female Solo Singer	Maudy Ayunda	Nominated
2017	Dahsyatnya Awards	Outstanding Song	"Jakarta Ramai"	Nominated
2017	Brand Ambassador Awards	Favorite Brand Ambassador	Maudy Ayunda (from LUX)	Nominated
2017	Style Awards	Most Influential Millennial of the Year	Maudy Ayunda	Won
2017	BUBU Awards	Best Digital Influencer	Maudy Ayunda	Won
2018	Dahsyatnya Awards	Outstanding Female Solo Singer	Maudy Ayunda	Nominated
2018	Indonesian Music Awards	Best Female Solo Singer	Maudy Ayunda	Nominated
2018	Indonesian Music Awards	Best Pop Album	Oxygen	Nominated
2018	Indonesian Music Awards	Best Collaboration	"We Don't (Still Water)"	Nominated
2018	Indonesian Music Awards	Best Sound Production	"Aku Sedang Mencintaimu"	Nominated
2019	Maya Awards	Best Theme Song	"Kamu dan Kenangan"	Nominated
2019	Indonesia Music Awards	Best Original Soundtrack	"Kamu dan Kenangan"	Nominated
2020	Bandung Film Festival	Best Actress in Lead Role	"Habibie & Ainun 3"	Nominated
2021	Forbes Asia	Forbes Asia 30 Under 30	Maudy Ayunda	Won
2022	Indonesian Movie Actors Awards	Best Supporting Actress	"Losmen Bu Broto"	Nominated
2022	Indonesian Movie Actors Awards	Favorite Supporting Actress	"Losmen Bu Broto"	Won
2022	Indonesian Film Festival	Best Supporting Actress	"Losmen Bu Broto"	Nominated
2022	Indonesian Film Festival	Best Original Soundtrack	"Semakin Jauh" (from Losmen Bu Broto film)	Nominated
2023	Fortune Indonesia	40 Under 40	Maudy Ayunda	Won
2024	R.A. Kartini Awards	Inspiring Female Artist in Education and Music	Maudy Ayunda	Won
2025	Indonesian Influencer Awards	Lifetime Achievement Award	Maudy Ayunda	Won
