= Archipelago International =

Hotel management company in south-east Asia

PT Archipelago International Indonesia
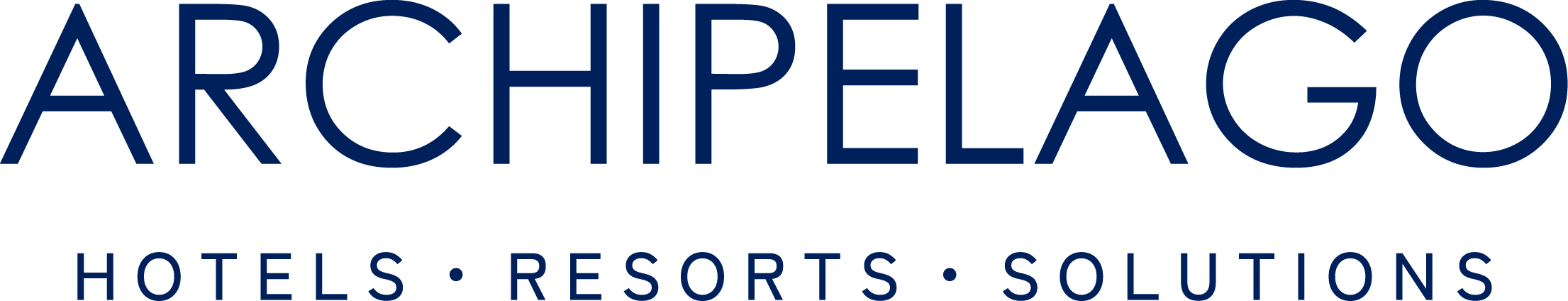
- Type: Private
- Industry: Hospitality, hotels, Hotel Chain
- Founded: 1997; 29 years ago
- Founder: Charles E. Brookfield
- Headquarters: Jakarta, Indonesia
- Number of locations: 200+
- Area served: Asia-Pacific; Middle East; Latin America; Africa; Caribbean
- Key people: Charles E. Brookfield (Founder and Chairman); John M. Flood (CEO); Jules Brookfield (CTO)
- Brands: ASTON; ASTON Collection Hotels; Huxley; Kamuela Villas; The Alana; Harper; Quest Hotels; Hotel NEO favehotels Nordic Hotel; Powered by Archipelago
- AUM: US$ 6 Billion+
- Website: archipelagointernational.com

Archipelago Hotels is a privately owned hotel management company headquartered in Jakarta, Indonesia. The company operates hotels across Southeast Asia, the Middle East, Latin America, the Caribbean, and Oceania.

== Overview ==
The company manages more than 300 hotels comprising over 45,000 rooms across 13 brands: Aston, The Alana, Huxley, Kamuela, Avanika, Harper, Quest, Four Corners, Neo, fave, Nordic, Powered by Archipelago, and Aston Collection.

As of December 2024, Hotels magazine ranked Archipelago Hotels 42nd globally by total room count.

== History ==
=== Founding and Early Years (1997–2000) ===
Archipelago Hotels traces its origins to 1997, when Charles Brookfield established Aston International in Indonesia, with a focus on hotel management, serviced apartments, and property services. The company entered the market during the 1997 Asian financial crisis, a period of significant contraction in the regional hospitality sector. During this time, Aston pursued a strategy centred on midscale and budget hotels, targeting domestic travellers and cities with limited hotel supply.

The company also repositioned serviced apartments in the Indonesian market as daily-stay accommodation with long-stay facilities. In 2000, Aston relocated its headquarters from Hawaii to Jakarta.

=== Expansion and Brand Diversification (2000s–2012) ===
Following its establishment, Aston International expanded across Indonesia through a multi brand portfolio spanning several market segments. Brands included Grand Aston and Royal Kamuela in the luxury segment, Aston and Kamuela Villas in the upscale category, and Aston City, Aston Inn, and Quest in the midscale segment.

The company later entered the budget hotel market with the launch of favehotel, targeting business travellers seeking affordable standardised accommodation. The brand initially launched with 12 to 15 management contracts in cities including Denpasar and Surabaya, later expanding to more than 50 properties across Indonesia. In 2011, the group announced plans to open 20 favehotel properties simultaneously, reflecting rapid acceleration in its budget segment strategy.

In 2012, the company unveiled Hotel Neo, a new superior select-service brand positioned between the budget favehotel and the upscale Aston brands. That same year, the group broke ground on Aston Priority Simatupang Hotel & Conference Center in South Jakarta, described at the time as the largest Aston hotel planned in the capital.

Aston also began extending operations into regional markets, including Malaysia and the Philippines.

=== Rebranding as Archipelago International (2013) ===
In 2013, Aston International was rebranded as Archipelago International, reflecting its expanded geographic footprint and brand portfolio. The company was the first Indonesian hotel operator to receive ISO 9001 certification.
