= Persona non grata (disambiguation) =

A persona non grata is a foreign person whose entering or remaining in a particular country is prohibited by that country's government.

Persona Non Grata may also refer to:

- Persona non grata (Philippines), non-binding resolution by local government units or subnational governments in the Philippines
- Persona Non Grata (2003 film), a documentary film
- Persona Non Grata (2005 film), a Polish drama film
- Persona Non Grata (2015 film), a Japanese biographical drama film
- Persona Non Grata (2019 film), a French remake of the 2002 Brazilian thriller film O Invasor
- Persona Non Grata (2021 film), a Danish drama film
- Persona Non Grata (Urban Dance Squad album), 1994
- Persona Non Grata, an album by Authority Zero
- Persona Non Grata (Exodus album), 2021
- "Persona Non Grata," the 13th and final episode of the fourth season of The Americans
- "Persona Non Grata", the 3rd episode of the second season of Kamen Rider Amazons
- "Persona Non Grata", the title of the fourth mission of video game Call of Duty: Modern Warfare 3.
