= Adipati Dolken =

Indonesian actor

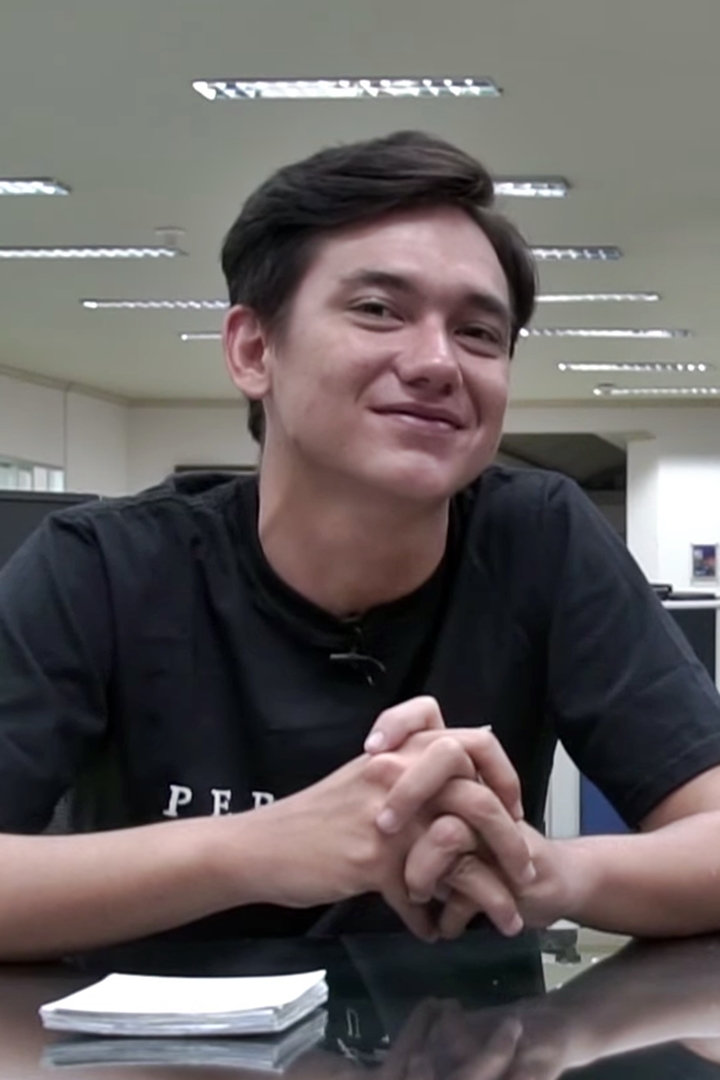
- Adipati on interview with Media Indonesia, 2019
- Born: Adipati Koesmadji; 19 August 1991 (age 35); Tangerang, Banten, Indonesia
- Occupations: Actor; Model
- Years active: 2008 - present
- Spouse: Canti Tachril (m. 2020)
- Relatives: Gianina Emanuella (elder sister)

Adipati Koesmadji (born in Tangerang, Banten, Indonesia on 19 August 1991), better known by his stage name Adipati Dolken, is an Indonesian actor and model.

== Career ==
Adipati gained prominence when he appeared in a supporting role on the soap opera Kepompong (Indonesian: Cocoon), which aired on SCTV from 2008 to 2009. He was later cast in Putih Abu-Abu dan Sepatu Kets (Indonesian: White-Grey and Athletic Shoes), his first collaboration with the film's director Nayato Fio Nuala, who later directed him in 18+ (2010) and its sequel, 18++ Forever Love (2012).

In 2012, he starred along with Maudy Ayunda and Surya Saputra in Malaikat Tanpa Sayap (Indonesian: An Angel with No Wings). Later, he co-starred with Maudy Ayunda once again, alongside Reza Rahadian, in Perahu Kertas (Indonesian: Paper Boats), which was adapted from the novel of the same name by its author Dewi "Dee" Lestari. It was released in August. In December the same year, its sequel was released, with Adipati reprising his role.

In 2013, he appeared in the historical film The Clerics (Sang Kiai), where his performance garnered him the Citra Award for Best Supporting Actor at the 2013 Indonesian Film Festival. At the age of 22, he was one of the youngest award recipients at the festival. In the same year, he also appeared as Bimbim in Slank Nggak Ada Matinya (Indonesian: Slank Never Dies), the biographical film about the band Slank.

In 2014, he appeared in three comedy films; Marmut Merah Jambu (Indonesian: The Pink Guinea Pig), Aku, Kau, & KUA (Indonesian: You, Me & The Office of Religion Affairs) and Kukejar Cinta ke Negeri Cina (Indonesian: I Pursue My Love to China). In 2015, he starred in Jenderal Soedirman as the titular character, General Sudirman, and 3 Dara (Indonesian: 3 Maidens) alongside Tora Sudiro and Tanta Ginting. In 2016, he made a cameo appearance in Koala Kumal, and starred in Catatan Dodol Calon Dokter.

In 2017, he starred in two drama films; At Stake (Indonesian: Sacrifice) and Posesif (Indonesian: Possessive), the latter landed him a nomination for the Citra Award for Best Leading Actor at the 2017 Indonesian Film Festival.

In 2018, he starred alongside his girlfriend Vanesha Prescilla in the semi-biographical romantic comedy film #TemanTapiMenikah (Indonesian: #FriendsButMarried), based on the book of the same name about the real-life love story between Ditto Percussion and Ayudia Bing Slamet. He also appeared in The Man from the Sea (film), a Japanese-Indonesian-French co-production directed by Koji Fukada. Adipati was cast in the film, which was shot in Aceh, alongside fellow Indonesian actress Sekar Sari and Japanese actors Dean Fujioka, Mayu Tsuruta and Taiga.

== Personal life ==
Adipati was born in Ciputat, Tangerang Banten, Indonesia. He has mixed German and Javanese ancestry. During his early career he was credited as Adipati Koesmadji, his birth name. While on vacation in Puncak he decided to adopt a stage name, choosing Dolken, the name of the Dutch owner of the villa where he was staying.

Adipati is a GATSBY Indonesia brand ambassador.

== Filmography ==
=== Film ===
- Putih Abu-Abu dan Sepatu Kets (2009)
- 18+ (2010)
- Pocong Keliling (2010)
- 18++ Forever Love (2012)
- Malaikat Tanpa Sayap (2012)
- Perahu Kertas (2012)
- Perahu Kertas 2 (2012)
- Sang Martir (2012)
- Operation Wedding (2013)
- Sang Kiai (The Clerics) (2013)
- Crazy Love (2013)
- Adriana (2013)
- Slank Never Dies (2013)
- Pink Guinea Pig (2014)
- Aku, Kau & KUA (2014)
- Chasing Love to China (2014)
- Jenderal Soedirman (2015)
- 3 Dara (2015)
- Koala Kumal (2016)
- CADO CADO: Doctor 101 (2016)
- At Stake (2017)
- Posesif (2017)
- Hujan Bulan Juni (2017)
- #TemanTapiMenikah (2018)
- The Man from the Sea (film) (2018)
- 3 Dara 2 (2018)
- The Fugitive (2019)
- A Hunter in Blue Manchester (Pemburu di Manchester Biru; 2020)

=== Television ===
- Kepompong
- Kejora dan Bintang
- Dia Jantung Hatiku
- Aliya
- Cahaya Gemilang
- Heart Series 2
- Get Married The Series 2
- The Publicist
- Alphabet
- Sekotengs (2024) as Raka Dewantara

== Awards and nominations ==
Year	Award	Category	Nominated work	Result	Ref.
2013	Indonesian Film Festival	Citra Award for Best Supporting Actor	Sang Kiai	Won	
2014	Asia Model Festival Awards	Professional Actor	—N/a	Won	
2014	Nickelodeon Indonesia Kids' Choice Awards	Favorite Actor	—N/a	Won	
2014	Bali International Film Festival	Appreciation Award	—N/a	Won	
2016	Maya Awards	Outstanding Cameo	Koala Kumal	Nominated	
2017	Maya Awards	Best Actor in a Leading Role	Posesif	Nominated	
2017	Indonesian Film Festival	Citra Award for Best Leading Actor	Posesif	Nominated	
2018	Indonesian Film Festival	Citra Award for Best Leading Actor	Teman Tapi Menikah	Nominated	
2018	Indonesian Choice Awards	Actor of the Year	—N/a	Won	
