= 2022 Stockholm International Film Festival =

Film festival in Stockholm, Sweden

- Official poster
- Opening film: Boy from Heaven by Tarik Saleh
- Closing film: Master Gardener by Paul Schrader
- Location: Stockholm, Sweden
- Founded: 1990
- Awards: Bronze Horse (Holy Spider)
- No. of films: 130 from 50 countries
- Festival date: 9–20 November 2022
- Website: stockholmfilmfestival.se/en

Stockholm International Film Festival
- 2023 2021

The 33rd Stockholm International Film Festival took place from 9 to 20 November 2022 in Stockholm, Sweden. The festival was opened with the Nordic premiere of political thriller film Boy from Heaven directed by Tarik Saleh and closed with Paul Schrader's crime thriller Master Gardener.

The most prestigious award, Bronze Horse was awarded to crime thriller film Holy Spider, directed by Ali Abbasi.

== Official Selection ==
=== In competition ===
The following films were selected for the main international competition:

English title	Original title	Director(s)	Production country
Autobiography		Makbul Mubarak	Indonesia, France, Germany, Poland, Singapore, Philippines, Qatar
Beautiful Beings	Berdreymi	Guðmundur Arnar Guðmundsson	Iceland
Blanquita		Fernando Guzzoni	Chile, Mexico, Luxembourg, France, Poland
Bread and Salt	Chleb i sól	Damian Kocur	Poland
The Damned Don't Cry	Les damnés ne pleurent pas	Fyzal Boulifa	France, Morocco, Belgium
Emily		Frances O'Connor	United Kingdom, United States
For My Country	Pour la France	Rachid Hami	France
Harka		Lotfy Nathan	France, Tunisia, Luxembourg, Belgium, Germany, United States
Holy Spider	عنکبوت مقدس	Ali Abbasi	Denmark, Sweden, France, Germany
Love According to Dalva	Dalva	Emmanuelle Nicot	France, Belgium
Lullaby	Cinco lobitos	Alauda Ruiz de Azúa	Spain
A Man	ある男	Kei Ishikawa	Japan
Mother and Son	Un petit frère	Léonor Serraille	France
Motherhood	La Maternal	Pilar Palomero	Spain
The Pack	La jauría	Andrés Ramírez Pulido	Colombia, France
Return to Seoul	Retour à Séoul	Davy Chou	France, Germany, Belgium, Qatar, Cambodia
Saint Omer		Alice Diop	France
Scarlet	L'envol	Pietro Marcello	France, Italy, Germany, Russia
Until Tomorrow	تا فردا	Ali Asgari	Iran, France, Qatar

Highlighted title indicates Bronze Horse winner.

=== International Documentary ===
English title	Original title	Director(s)	Production country
All That Breathes		Shaunak Sen	India, United States, United Kingdom
All the Beauty and the Bloodshed		Laura Poitras	United States
Eternal Spring		Jason Loftus	Canada
Freedom on Fire: Ukraine's Fight for Freedom		Evgeny Afineevsky	Ukraine, United Kingdom, United States
The Grab		Gabriela Cowperthwaite	United States
The Kiev Trial	Киевский процесс	Sergei Loznitsa	Ukraine, Netherlands
Lynch/Oz		Alexandre O. Philippe	United States
The March on Rome	Marcia su Roma	Mark Cousins	Italy
Mariupolis 2		Mantas Kvedaravičius	Lithuania, France, Germany
The Matchmaker		Benedetta Argentieri	Italy
My Old School		Jono McLeod	United Kingdom
Nothing Compares		Kathryn Ferguson	Ireland, United Kingdom
A Rising Fury		Lesya Kalynska, Ruslan Batytsky	Ukraine, Norway, United States
The Territory		Alex Pritz	Brazil, Denmark, United States

=== Open Zone ===
English title	Original title	Director(s)	Production country
The Beasts	As bestas	Rodrigo Sorogoyen	Spain, France
Boy from Heaven (opening)	صبي من الجنة	Tarik Saleh	Sweden, France, Finland
Broker	브로커	Hirokazu Kore-eda	South Korea
Decision to Leave	헤어질 결심	Park Chan-wook	South Korea
Empire of Light		Sam Mendes	United Kingdom, United States
The Kings of the World	Los reyes del mundo	Laura Mora Ortega	Colombia
Klondike	Клондайк	Maryna Er Gorbach	Ukraine, Turkey
Leonora addio		Paolo Taviani	Italy
Nostalgia		Mario Martone	Italy, France
The Novelist's Film	소설가의 영화	Hong Sang-soo	South Korea
One Year, One Night	Un año, una noche	Isaki Lacuesta	Spain, France
Rabiye Kurnaz vs. George W. Bush		Andreas Dresen	Germany, France
Rebel		Adil El Arbi, Bilall Fallah	Belgium, France, Luxembourg
The Silent Twins		Agnieszka Smoczyńska	United Kingdom, Poland, United States
Stella in Love	Stella est amoureuse	Sylvie Verheyde	France
Walk Up	탑	Hong Sang-soo	South Korea
World War III	جنگ جهانی سوم	Houman Seyyedi	Iran

=== Discovery ===
English title	Original title	Director(s)	Production country
Alma viva		Cristèle Alves Meira	Portugal, Belgium, France
Blue Jean		Georgia Oakley	United Kingdom
Brian and Charles		Jim Archer	United Kingdom
Butterfly Vision	Бачення метелика	Maksym Nakonechnyi	Ukraine, Croatia, Czechia, Sweden
Daughter of Rage	La hija de todas las rabias	Laura Baumeister de Montis	Nicaragua
How Is Katia?	Як там Катя?	Christina Tynkevych	Ukraine
Plan 75		Chie Hayakawa	Japan, Philippines, France
Robe of Gems	Manto de gemas	Natalia López Gallardo	Mexico, Argentina, United States
Rodéo		Lola Quivoron	France
The Quiet Girl	An Cailín Ciúin	Colm Bairéad	Ireland
The Water	El agua	Elena López Riera	Switzerland, Spain, France
The Woodcutter Story	Metsurin tarina	Mikko Myllylahti	Finland, Netherlands, Denmark, Germany
The Worst Ones	Les Pires	Lise Akoka, Romane Gueret	France

=== Icons ===
English title	Original title	Director(s)	Production country
The Banshees of Inisherin		Martin McDonagh	United Kingdom, United States
Bones and All		Luca Guadagnino	Italy, United States
Call Jane		Phyllis Nagy	United States
Dead for a Dollar		Walter Hill	Canada, United States
Good Luck to You, Leo Grande		Sophie Hyde	United Kingdom, United States
The Listener		Steve Buscemi	United States
Living		Oliver Hermanus	United Kingdom
Master Gardener (closing)		Paul Schrader	United States
Other People's Children	Les enfants des autres	Rebecca Zlotowski	France
Prison 77	Modelo 77	Alberto Rodríguez Librero	Spain
She Said		Maria Schrader	United States
The Sitting Duck	La Syndicaliste	Jean-Paul Salomé	France, Germany
The Son		Florian Zeller	France, United Kingdom, United States
The Woman King		Gina Prince-Bythewood	United States

=== American Independent ===
English title	Original title	Director(s)	Production country
Bruiser		Miles Warren	United States
Cherry		Sophie Galibert	United States
Funny Pages		Owen Kline	United States
I Love My Dad		James Morosini	United States
Monica		Andrea Pallaoro	United States, Italy
Nanny		Nikyatu Jusu	United States
Palm Trees and Power Lines		Jamie Dack	United States
Peace in the Valley		Tyler Riggs	United States
To Leslie		Michael Morris	United States
War Pony		Riley Keough, Gina Gammell	United States

=== Twilight Zone ===
English title	Original title	Director(s)	Production country
Blood Flower	Harum Malam	Dain Said	Malaysia
Family Dinner		Peter Hengl	Austria
The Gravity	La Gravité	Cédric Ido	France
House of Darkness		Neil LaBute	United States
Hunt	헌트	Lee Jung-jae	South Korea
Medusa Deluxe		Thomas Hardiman	United Kingdom
Nightsiren	Světlonoc	Tereza Nvotová	Slovakia, Czechia
Project Wolf Hunting	늑대사냥	Kim Hong-seon	South Korea
V/H/S/99		Johannes Roberts, Vanessa and Joseph Winter, Maggie Levin, Tyler MacIntyre, Flying Lotus	United States
Venus		Jaume Balagueró	Spain, United States
Wetiko		Kerry Mondragon	Mexico

=== Special Presentations ===
English title	Original title	Director(s)	Production country	Network
Copenhagen Cowboy		Nicolas Winding Refn	Denmark	Netflix

== Awards ==
The following awards were presented at the festival:

- Best Film (Bronze Horse): Holy Spider by Ali Abbasi
- Best Director: Frances O'Connor for Emily
- Best Debut: Autobiography by Makbul Mubarak
- Best Script: Beautiful Beings by Guðmundur Arnar Guðmundsson
- Best Actress: Annabelle Lengronne for Mother and Son
- Best Actor: Mehdi Bajestani for Holy Spider
- Best Cinematography: Balthazar Lab for The Pack
- Honorable Mention: Pilar Palomero for Motherhood
- Best Documentary: All the Beauty and the Bloodshed by Laura Poitras
- Best Short Film: File by Sonia K. Hadad
- FIPRESCI Award: World War III by Houman Seyyedi
- Zalando Rising Star Award 2022: Sara Shirpey

=== Lifetime Achievement Award ===
- Anthony Hopkins

=== Achievement Award ===
- Fares Fares

=== Visionary Award ===
- Sam Mendes
