= List of Indonesian films of 2022 =

The following is a list of Indonesian feature films showing in theaters and those being channeled on video-on-demand services in 2022.

== Box office collection ==
Rank	Film	Production	No of viewer in cinema
1.	KKN di Desa Penari	MD Pictures, Pichouse Films	9.233.847
2.	Satan's Slaves 2: Communion	Rapi Films	6.391.982
3.	Miracle in Cell No. 7	Falcon Pictures	5.851.595
4.	Ngeri-Ngeri Sedap	Imajinari	2.886.121
5.	Ivanna	MD Pictures, Pichouse Films	2.793.775
6.	Sayap-Sayap Patah	Maxima Pictures, Denny Siregar Production	2.426.084
7.	Mencuri Raden Saleh	Visinema Pictures	2.350.741
8.	Kukira Kau Rumah	MD Pictures, Sinemaku Pictures	2.220.180
9.	The Doll 3	Hitmaker Studios	1.764.077
11.	Qodrat	Magma Entertainment, Rapi Films	1.751.637
10.	Jailangkung: Sandekala	Sky Media	1.546.295
12.	Qorin	IDN Pictures	1.323.008
13.	Kuntilanak 3	MVP Pictures	1.313.304
14.	Argantara	Hitmaker Studios	1.054.390
14.	Pamali	Lyto Pictures	878.588
15.	Inang	IDN Pictures	828.168
16.	Dear Nathan: Thank You Salma	Rapi Films, Screenplay Films	754.744

== January–March ==
Opening		Title	Director	Actro	Genre	Production	Distributor	Penonton	Ref.
J A N U A R y	6	Cinta Pertama, Kedua & Ketiga	Gina S. Noer	Angga Aldi Yunanda, Putri Marino, Slamet Rahardjo, Ira Wibowo	Romance Drama	Starvision Plus, Wahana Kreator Nusantara		108.579	
J A N U A R y	6	Bus Om Bebek	Aditya Gumay, Ozan Ruz	Azis Gagap, Zara Leola, Muhammad Adhiyat, Ricky Cuaca, Sarwendah	Comedy Musical	Smaradhana Pro		18.352	
J A N U A R y	13	Dear Nathan: Thank You Salma	Kuntz Agus	Amanda Rawles, Jefri Nichol, Ardhito Pramono, Indah Permatasari, Susan Sameh	Romantic Drama	Rapi Films, Screenplay Films		754.122	
J A N U A R y	13	Penyalin Cahaya	Wregas Bhanuteja	Shenina Cinnamon, Chicco Kurniawan, Lutesha, Jerome Kurnia, Dea Panendra, Giulio Parengkuan	Crime Mystery	Rekata Studio, Kaninga Pictures	Netflix		
J A N U A R y	13	Trah 7	Ferial Rachmany	Kevin Torsten, Chantiq Schagerl, Surya R Kusumah, Gary Iskak	Horor	DLK Production		5.748	
J A N U A R y	14	Cek Ombak (Melulu)	Suroso MYS	Bryan Domani, Hanggini, Shareefa Daanish, Hans de Kraker	Romantic Drama	KlikFilm Productions, Merpati Film	KlikFilm		
J A N U A R y	14	Enam Batang	Eman Pradipta	Angela Gilsha, Omar Daniel, Ersya Aurelia	Romantic Drama	KlikFilm Productions, Canary Studios, RK23 Pictures	KlikFilm		
J A N U A R y	14	Ada Mertua di Rumahku	Rully Manna	Rano Karno, Roger Danuarta, Cut Meyriska	Family Drama	KlikFilm Productions, Merpati Film	KlikFilm		
J A N U A R y	20	Merindu Cahaya de Amstel	Hadrah Daeng Ratu	Amanda Rawles, Bryan Domani, Rachel Amanda, Oki Setiana Dewi, Ridwan Remin, Maudy Koesnaedi	Religious Drama	Maxstream Original, Unlimited Production, Maxima Pictures, Imperial Pictures, Dwi Abisatya Persada		401.271	
J A N U A R y	20	Teluh	Dedy Mercy	Baron Hermanto, Ferdi Ali, Monique Henry, Farahdibba Ferreira	Horor	786 Productions, Mercusuar Films, Black Horse Entertainment, Morning Sky Entertainment		500.039	
J A N U A R y	27	Ben & Jody	Angga Dwimas Sasongko	Rio Dewanto, Chicco Jerikho, Hana Malasan, Aghniny Haque, Muzakki Ramdhan, Reza Hilman	Action	Visinema Pictures, Jagartha, Blibli, Astro Shaw		107.803	
F E B R U A R Y	3	Akad	Reka Wijaya	Kevin Julio, Indah Permatasari, Mathias Muchus, Nino Fernandez	Drana Rinabce	Maxstream Original, Indonesia Tourism Development Corporation, BUMN, IFI Sinema, E-Motion Entertainment		5.084	
F E B R U A R Y	3	Kukira Kau Rumah	Umay Shahab	Prilly Latuconsina, Jourdy Pranata, Shenina Cinnamon, Raim Laode, Unique Priscilla, Kiki Narendra	Drama Phycology	MD Pictures, Sinemaku Pictures		2.219.265	
F E B R U A R Y	4	Arini by Love.inc	Adrianto Sinaga	Della Dartyan, Kelly Tandiono, Marissa Anita, Faris Nahdi	Thriller	Visinema Pictures	Bioskop Online		
F E B R U A R Y	14	Cinta Warung Sebelah	Ahmad Nurdin	Ibnu Jamil, Ririn Ekawati, Cemen, Lulu Zakaria, Yusuf Özkan	Drama, Komedi	Maxstream Original, Arkana Films, Sabi Kreasi, PT. Redi Aliansi Jaya	Maxstream		
F E B R U A R Y	17	Pelangi Tanpa Warna	Indra Gunawan	Rano Karno, Maudy Koesnaedi, Zayyan Sakha, Ratna Riantiarno	Drama	Falcon Pictures		11.521	
F E B R U A R Y	18	Clandestine	Dyan Sunu Prastowo	Abun Sungkar, Dannia Salsabilla, Shareefa Daanish	Drama Thriller	KlikFilm Productions	KlikFilm		
F E B R U A R Y	18	Father & Son	Danial Rifki	Bio One, Dwi Sasono	Drama	KlikFilm Productions	KlikFilm		
F E B R U A R Y	24	Garis Waktu	Jeihan Angga	Reza Rahadian, Anya Geraldine, Michelle Ziudith	Romantic Drama	MD Pictures, Dapur Film		325.800	

== April–June ==
=== April ===
- Tuhan Minta Duit
- I Need You Baby
- Tutuge
- Oma the Demonic
- KKN di Desa Penari
- Kuntilanak 3

=== May ===
- Cinta Subuh

=== June ===
- Ngeri-Ngeri Sedap
- Rumah Kuntilanak
- Satria Dewa: Gatotkaca
- Madu Murni

== July–September ==
=== July ===
- Ivanna
- Ghost Writer 2
- The Sacred Riana 2: Bloody Mary

=== August ===
- Before, Now & Then
- Satan's Slaves 2: Communion
- Sayap-Sayap Patah
- Mencuri Raden Saleh

=== September ===
- Mumun
- Mendarat Darurat
- Noktah Merah Perkawinan
- Lara Ati
- Jailangkung: Sandekala
- Until Tomorrow
- Jagat Arwah

== October- December ==
=== October ===
- Pamali
- Inang
- Perfect Strangers
- Rumah Kaliurang

=== November ===
- Perempuan Bergaun Merah
- Nariti, Romansa Danau Toba
- Sri Asih
- Ashiap Man

=== December ===
horor indonesia film Pewer Of Horor Indonesia

- Qorin
- Like & Share
- Nagih Janji Cinta
- Cek Toko Sebelah 2
- Tumbal Kanjeng Iblis
- KKN di Desa Penari: Luwih Dowo, Luwih Medeni
