= Srimulat: Hil yang Mustahal =

2022 biographical comedy film

- Theatrical release poster
- Directed by: Fajar Nugros
- Written by: Fajar Nugros
- Produced by: Susanti Dewi; Emilka Chaidir
- Starring: Bio One; Dimas Anggara; Elang El Gibran; Erika Carlina; Erick Estrada; Ibnu Jamil; Indah Permatasari; Morgan Oey; Naimma Aljufri; Rano Karno; Rukman Rosadi; Teuku Rifnu Wikana; Zulfa Maharani
- Cinematography: Wendy Aga
- Edited by: Wawan I. Wibowo; Aline Jusria
- Music by: Aghi Narottama; Bemby Gusti; Tony Merle
- Production companies: MNC Pictures; IDN Pictures
- Release date: 19 May 2022 (Indonesia)
- Running time: 110 minutes
- Country: Indonesia
- Languages: Javanese; Indonesian

Srimulat: Hil Yang Mustahal is a 2022 biographical comedy film directed and written by Fajar Nugros about Indonesian legendary comedy troupe Srimulat. It stars an ensemble cast featuring Bio One, Dimas Anggara, Elang El Gibran, Erika Carlina, Erick Estrada, Ibnu Jamil, Indah Permatasari, Morgan Oey, Naimma Aljufri, Rano Karno, Rukman Rosadi, Teuku Rifnu Wikana, and Zulfa Maharani.

The film was released theatrically in Indonesia on 19 May 2022. It received four nominations at the 2022 Indonesian Film Festival, including Best Actor (One) and Best Supporting Actor (Gibran).

== Premise ==
The film follows the journey of the comedy troupe Srimulat from their performances at the Teater Sriwedari in Surakarta to seeking their fortune in Jakarta.

== Cast ==
- Bio One as Gepeng
- Elang El Gibran as Basuki
- Ibnu Jamil as Tarzan
- Indah Permatasari as Royani
- Dimas Anggara as Timbul
- Teuku Rifnu Wikana as Asmuni
- Erick Estrada as Tessy
- Zulfa Maharani as Nunung
- Morgan Oey as Paul
- Naimma Aljufri as Rohana
- Erika Carlina as Djudjuk Djuariah
- Rukman Rosadi as Teguh Slamet Rahardjo
- Rano Karno as Babe Makmur

== Production ==
In 2018, MNC Pictures as the intellectual property owner of Srimulat appointed Cuk FK to direct a biopic of the comedy troupe. One of the members, Nunung, confirmed that she would be playing as herself, along with Nagita Slavina as Djudjuk, Lukman Sardi as Timbul, Andre Taulany as Asmuni, Sule as Tessy, and Tora Sudiro as Gepeng. The plan was eventually scrapped, due to scheduling conflicts. In 2021, IDN Pictures announced a collaboration with MNC Pictures to produce the film, with Fajar Nugros attached as the director and writer. In April 2022, it was announced that the film would be split into two parts.

Principal photography took place in Surakarta and Jakarta from December 2021 to January 2022.

== Release ==
Srimulat: Hil yang Mustahal was released in Indonesia theatrically on 19 May 2022. It garnered 246,711 admissions during its theatrical run. Amazon Prime Video acquired its distribution rights, releasing it on 30 March 2023.

== Accolades ==
Award / Film Festival	Date of ceremony	Category	Recipient(s)	Result	Ref.
Indonesian Film Festival	22 November 2022	Best Actor	Bio One	Nominated	
Indonesian Film Festival	22 November 2022	Best Supporting Actor	Elang El Gibran	Nominated	
Indonesian Film Festival	22 November 2022	Best Costume Design	Angela Suri Nasution	Nominated	
Indonesian Film Festival	22 November 2022	Best Makeup	Jerry Oktavianus	Nominated	
Film Pilihan Tempo	18 December 2022	Best Director	Fajar Nugros	Nominated	
Film Pilihan Tempo	18 December 2022	Best Screenplay	Fajar Nugros	Nominated	
Film Pilihan Tempo	18 December 2022	Best Actor	Bio One	Nominated	
Film Pilihan Tempo	18 December 2022	Best Supporting Actor	Elang El Gibran	Nominated	
