= 2022 Indonesian Film Festival =

2022 Indonesian film awards

42nd Indonesian Film Festival
- Date: 22 November 2022
- Site: Jakarta Convention Center; Jakarta, Indonesia
- Hosted by: Cut Mini; Marsha Timothy; Prilly Latuconsina; Shenina Cinnamon

Highlights
- Best Picture: Before, Now & Then
- Most awards: Before, Now & Then; Vengeance Is Mine, All Others Pay Cash (5)
- Most nominations: Vengeance Is Mine, All Others Pay Cash (12)

The 42nd Indonesian Film Festival ceremony, presented by Indonesian Film Board and Ministry of Education, Culture, Research, and Technology, honored the achievement in Indonesian cinema released from 1 September 2021 to 31 August 2022. The ceremony was held on 22 November 2022 at the Jakarta Convention Center, Jakarta, Indonesia, and presented by actresses Cut Mini, Marsha Timothy, Prilly Latuconsina and Shenina Cinnamon.

Drama film Before, Now & Then and action film Vengeance Is Mine, All Others Pay Cash won five awards each, the former was awarded Best Picture. Other winners included Satan's Slaves 2: Communion with two, Autobiography, Backstage, Blackout, Dancing Colors, First, Second & Third Love, Gimbal: A Bet Between Tradition and Pride, Ininnawa: An Island Calling, Kadet 1947 and Losmen Bu Broto with one.

== Winners and nominees ==
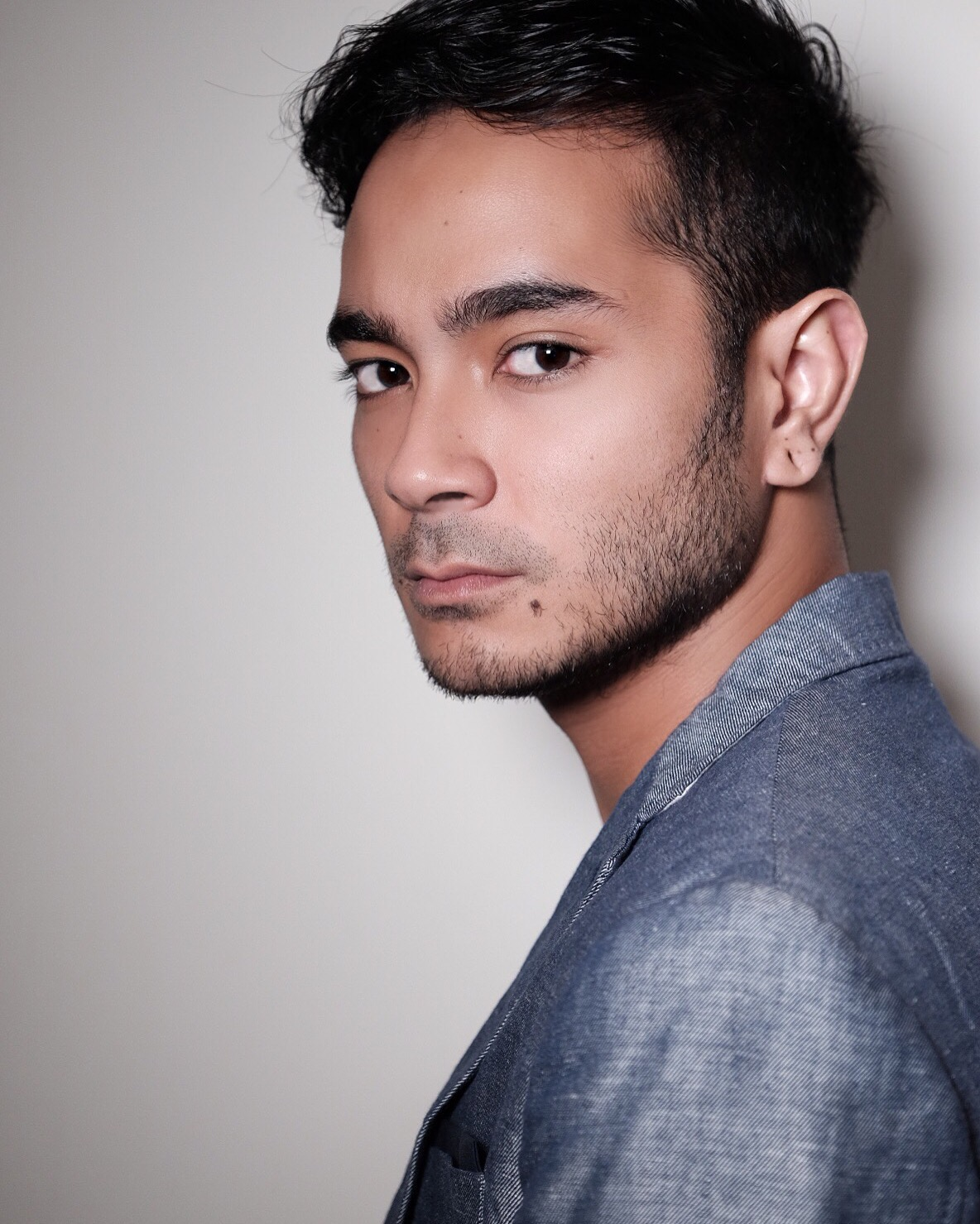
Marthino Lio, Best Actor winner

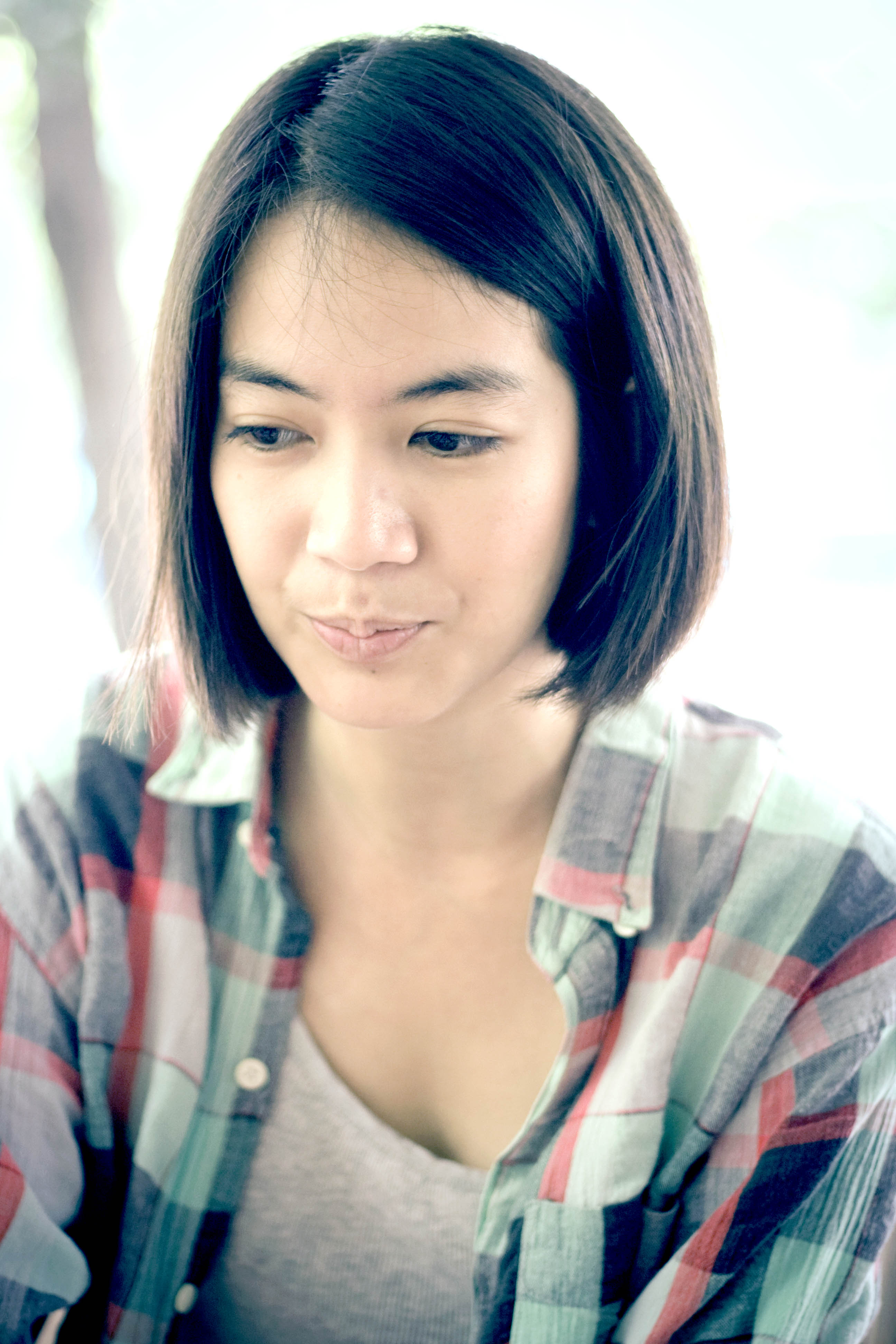
Ladya Cheryl, Best Actress winner

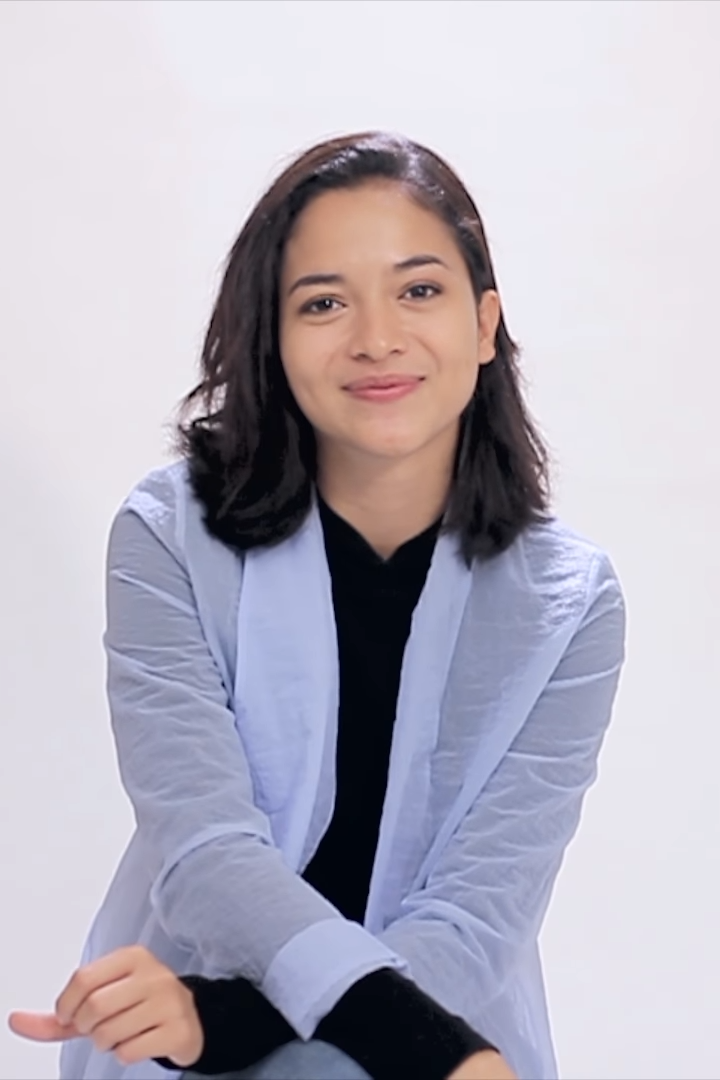
Putri Marino, Best Supporting Actress winner

The nominations were announced on 22 October 2022 and broadcast live from Borobudur, Central Java. The nominations were led by Vengeance Is Mine, All Others Pay Cash with twelve, Before, Now & Then followed with eleven and Stealing Raden Saleh with nine.

=== Awards ===
Winners are listed first, highlighted in boldface, and indicated with a double dagger (‡).

| **Best Picture**: **Before, Now & Then – Ifa Isfansyah and Gita Fara, producers**‡; Autobiography – Yulia Evina Bhara, producer; Missing Home – Dipa Andika, producer; Stealing Raden Saleh – Cristian Imanuell, producer; Vengeance Is Mine, All Others Pay Cash – Meiske Taurisia and Muhammad Zaidy, producers | **Best Director**: **Edwin – Vengeance Is Mine, All Others Pay Cash**‡; Angga Dwimas Sasongko – Stealing Raden Saleh; Bene Dion Rajagukguk – Missing Home; Kamila Andini – Before, Now & Then; Makbul Mubarak – Autobiography |
| **Best Actor**: **Marthino Lio – Vengeance Is Mine, All Others Pay Cash as Ajo Kawir**‡; Bio One – Srimulat: Hil yang Mustahal as Gepeng; Kevin Ardilova – Autobiography as Rakib; Oka Antara – The Red Point of Marriage as Gilang Priambodo; Vino G. Bastian – Miracle in Cell No. 7 as Dodo Rozak | **Best Actress**: **Ladya Cheryl – Vengeance Is Mine, All Others Pay Cash as Iteung**‡; Happy Salma – Before, Now & Then as Raden Nana Sunani; Marsha Timothy – The Red Point of Marriage as Ambarwati; Maudy Koesnaedi – Losmen Bu Broto as Bu Broto; Tika Panggabean – Missing Home as Mak Domu |
| **Best Supporting Actor**: **Slamet Rahardjo – First, Second & Third Love as Dewa**‡; Arswendy Bening Swara – Autobiography as Purnawinata; Elang El Gibran – Srimulat: Hil yang Mustahal as Basuki; Reza Rahadian – Vengeance Is Mine, All Others Pay Cash as Budi Baik; Rukman Rosadi – The Womb as Agus Santoso | **Best Supporting Actress**: **Putri Marino – Losmen Bu Broto as Mbak Pur**‡; Laura Basuki – Before, Now & Then as Ino; Maudy Ayunda – Losmen Bu Broto as Jeng Sri; Ratu Felisha – Vengeance Is Mine, All Others Pay Cash as Jelita; Sheila Dara Aisha – The Red Point of Marriage as Yulinar |
| **Best Original Screenplay**: **Autobiography – Makbul Mubarak**‡; First, Second & Third Love – Gina S. Noer; Kadet 1947 – Rahabi Mandra and Aldo Swastia; Missing Home – Bene Dion Rajagukguk; Stealing Raden Saleh – Husein M. Atmojo and Angga Dwimas Sasongko | **Best Adapted Screenplay**: **Vengeance Is Mine, All Others Pay Cash – Edwin and Eka Kurniawan**‡; Before, Now & Then – Kamila Andini and Ahda Imran; Losmen Bu Broto – Alim Sudio; Miracle in Cell No. 7 – Alim Sudio; The Red Point of Marriage – Titien Wattimena and Sabrina Rochelle Kalangie |
| **Best Cinematography**: **Before, Now & Then – Batara Goempar**‡; Kadet 1947 – Batara Goempar; Losmen Bu Broto – Muhammad Firdaus; Satan's Slaves 2: Communion – Jaisal Tanjung; Stealing Raden Saleh – Bagoes Tresna Adji | **Best Editing**: **Before, Now & Then – Akhmad Fesdi Anggoro**‡; Miracle in Cell No. 7 – Sentot Sahid; Satan's Slaves 2: Communion – Dinda Amanda; Stealing Raden Saleh – Hendra Adhi Susanto; The Womb – Wawan I. Wibowo |
| **Best Sound**: **Satan's Slaves 2: Communion – Mohammad Ikhsan and Anhar Moha**‡; Autobiography – L.H. Aim Adinegara and Hadrianus Eko; Kadet 1947 – Satrio Budiono and Jantra Suyarman; Miracle in Cell No. 7 – Wahyu Tri Purnomo and Syaf Fadrulsyah; Stealing Raden Saleh – Aufa R. Ariaputra and Satrio Budiono | **Best Visual Effects**: **Satan's Slaves 2: Communion – Abby Eldipie**‡; Kadet 1947 – Satrya Mahardhika; KKN di Desa Penari – Harris Reggy; Satria Dewa: Gatotkaca – Lumine Studio; Stealing Raden Saleh – After Lab |
| **Best Original Score**: **Before, Now & Then – Ricky Lionardi**‡; Missing Home – Viky Sianipar; Satan's Slaves 2: Communion – Aghi Narottama, Bemby Gusti and Tony Merle; Stealing Raden Saleh – Abel Hurray; Vengeance Is Mine, All Others Pay Cash – Dave Lumenta | **Best Original Song**: **"Melangkah" from Backstage – Music and Lyrics by Andi Rianto and Monty Tiwa; Performed by Sissy Priscillia, Vanesha Prescilla and Andi Rianto**‡; "Ambilkan Bintang" from Autobiography – Music, Lyrics and Performed by Sal Priadi; "Bangun Bajingan" from Vengeance Is Mine, All Others Pay Cash – Music and Lyrics by Ananda Badudu, Dave Lumenta and Rubina; Performed by Ananda Badudu, Dave Lumenta, Rubina and Lie Indra Perkasa; "Pulang" from Losmen Bu Broto – Music and Lyrics by Mikha Angelo; Performed by Maudy Ayunda; "Semakin Jauh" from Losmen Bu Broto – Music and Lyrics by Maudy Ayunda; Performed by Maudy Ayunda and Danilla |
| **Best Art Direction**: **Before, Now & Then – Vida Sylvia**‡; Kadet 1947 – Frans X. R. Paat; Satan's Slaves 2: Communion – Allan Sebastian; Stealing Raden Saleh – Yusuf Kaisuku; Vengeance Is Mine, All Others Pay Cash – Eros Eflin | **Best Costume Design**: **Vengeance Is Mine, All Others Pay Cash – Gemailla Gea Geriantiana**‡; Before, Now & Then – Retno Ratih Damayanti; Kadet 1947 – Gemailla Gea Geriantiana; Losmen Bu Broto – Hagai Pakan; Srimulat: Hil yang Mustahal – Angela Suri Nasution |
| **Best Makeup**: **Kadet 1947 – Eba Sheba**‡; Before, Now & Then – Eba Sheba; Satan's Slaves 2: Communion – Darwyn Tse; Srimulat: Hil yang Mustahal – Jerry Oktavianus; Vengeance Is Mine, All Others Pay Cash – Cherry Wirawan | **Best Live Action Short Film**: **Dancing Colors – M. Reza Fahriyansyah, director; Said Nurhidayat, producer**‡; Membicarakan Kejujuran Diana – Angkasa Ramadhan, director; Rien Al Anshari and Linda Ochy, producers (Special Jury Prize); Basiyat: Bathe My Corpse with Wine – Ahmad Faiz, director; Imam Syafi'i, producer; Culas – Sabrina Rochelle Kalangie, director; Ridla An-Nuur and Nurita Anandia W., producers; The Scent of Rat Carcasses – Dharma Putra Purna Nugraha, director; Yuh Rohana Meliala, producer; Sweet Squad – Haris Supiandi, director; Pawadi, producer |
| **Best Documentary Feature**: **Ininnawa: An Island Calling – Arfan Sabran, director; Nick Calpakdjian and Mark Olsen, producers**‡; Atas Nama Daun – Mahatma Putra, director; Anggi Panji Nayantaka and Dominique Renee Makalew, producers; Mencari Ibu – Dwiki Marta and Ayomi Amindoni, directors/producers; The Myriad of Faces of the Future Challengers – I Gede Mika and Yuki Aditya, directors; Hafiz Rancajale, producer; Roda-Roda Nada – Yuda Kurniawan, director; Yuda Kurniawan and Misya Latief, producers | **Best Documentary Short Film**: **Gimbal: A Bet Between Tradition and Pride – Sidiq Ariyadi, director; Irnayani Dina Mahmudah, producer**‡; Koesno, Jati Diri Soekarno – Faizal Anwar, director; Rina Fahlevi, producer; Lady Rocker Sylvia Saartje – Subiyanto, director; Andhika Yudha Pratama, producer; A Letter to the Future – Kurnia Yudha Fitranton, director; Ratno Hermanto, producer; Maramba – Riandhani Yudha Pamungkas, director; Daris Dzulfikar, producer; Sintas Berlayar – Firgiawan, director; Dwi Anggyan, producer; Tasaneda Sasandu Dalen – Wisnu Dwi Prasetyo, director/producer |
| **Best Animated Short Film**: **Blackout – Faiz Azhar, director/producer**‡; Desa Timun Bola – Daud Nugraha, director/producer; Jambrong & Gondrong – Monica Wijaya, director; Dermawan Syamsuddin, producer; Nusa Antara (The Archipelago) – Azalia Muchransyah & Firman Widyasmara, directors; Firman Widyasmara, producer; Wira Sang Pendekar Cilik – Maulana Layar Nurhakiki, director/producer | **Best Film Critic** **(Tanete Pong Masak Award)**: **Erina Adeline Tandian – "Perempuan Sebagai Ilusi: Politik Seksual Film Love for Sale"**‡; Aulia Adam for Magdalene.co – "Ngeri-Ngeri Sedap dan Film Batak yang Berusaha Lepas dari Jakartasentris"; Cine Crib – "Analisis Gembel: Kenapa Film Keramat Teramat Keramat? Dan Jurus Ampuh Bikin Film Horor Found Footage"; Dimas Ramadhiansyah for Astronet-Info Blogspot – "Penyalin Cahaya: Ketika Tubuh Dilukis dalam Ekosistem Digital"; Nimas Safira Widhiasti Wibowo for Slankordnamnim Blogspot – "Yuni (2021): Bakal Rabi" |
**Lifetime Achievement Award**: **Rima Melati**

=== Audience Awards ===
**Favorite Film** **(Ratna Asmara Award)**: **Stealing Raden Saleh**
| **Favorite Actor** **(Benyamin Sueb Award)**: **Vino G. Bastian** | **Favorite Actress** **(Rima Melati Award)**: **Aghniny Haque** |

=== Films with multiple nominations and awards ===
Films that received multiple nominations
| Nominations | Film |
|---|---|
| 12 | Vengeance Is Mine, All Others Pay Cash |
| 11 | Before, Now & Then |
| 9 | Stealing Raden Saleh |
| 8 | Losmen Bu Broto |
| 7 | Autobiography |
| 7 | Kadet 1947 |
| 7 | Satan's Slaves 2: Communion |
| 5 | Missing Home |
| 4 | Miracle in Cell No. 7 |
| 4 | The Red Point of Marriage |
| 4 | Srimulat: Hil yang Mustahal |
| 2 | First, Second & Third Love |
| 2 | The Womb |

Films that received multiple awards
| Awards | Film |
|---|---|
| 5 | Before, Now & Then |
| 5 | Vengeance Is Mine, All Others Pay Cash |
| 2 | Satan's Slaves 2: Communion |
