= First, Second & Third Love =

2021 romantic drama film

- Theatrical release poster
- Directed by: Gina S. Noer
- Screenplay by: Gina S. Noer
- Produced by: Chand Parwez Servia; Gina S. Noer
- Starring: Angga Yunanda; Ira Wibowo; Putri Marino; Slamet Rahardjo Djarot
- Cinematography: Roy Lolang
- Edited by: Aline Jusria
- Music by: Anggi Novalga; Salman Aristo
- Production companies: Starvision; Wahana Kreator
- Release dates: 4 December 2021 (Yogyakarta); 6 January 2022 (Indonesia)
- Running time: 111 minutes
- Country: Indonesia
- Language: Indonesian

First, Second & Third Love (Indonesian: Cinta Pertama, Kedua & Ketiga) is a 2021 romantic drama film directed and written by Gina S. Noer. It stars Angga Yunanda, Ira Wibowo, Putri Marino, and Slamet Rahardjo Djarot.

It had its world premiere at the 16th Jogja-NETPAC Asian Film Festival. It received two nominations at the 2022 Indonesian Film Festival, won one for Best Supporting Actor (Djarot).

== Premise ==
Raja and Asia share the same responsibility of caring for their respective single parents. As Raja convinces Asia that their parents are a good match for each other, Raja and Asia slowly fall in love.

== Cast ==
- Angga Yunanda as Raja
- Ira Wibowo as Linda
- Putri Marino as Asia
- Slamet Rahardjo Djarot as Dewa
- Widi Mulia as Ratu
- Ersa Mayori as Suri
- Elly D. Luthan as Grandma Nur
- Asri Welas as Diana
- Mian Tiara as Tika
- Ibnu Jamil as Bayu
- Ariyo Wahab as Emir
- Junior Roberts as Vino
- Izabel Jahja as Sinta

== Production ==
Noer revealed that the screenplay had been finished written in 2019. Principal photography took place in Jakarta and Puncak, Bogor, West Java, from July to August 2020. The project had been announced in July 2020 along with the cast announcement.

== Release ==
First, Second & Third Love had its world premiere as the closing film of 16th Jogja-NETPAC Asian Film Festival on 4 December 2021. It was theatrically released in Indonesia on 6 January 2022. It garnered 108,579 admissions during its theatrical run.

Netflix acquired its distribution rights, releasing it on 17 March 2022.

== Accolades ==
Award / Film Festival	Date of ceremony	Category	Recipient(s)	Result	Ref.
Film Pilihan Tempo	20 December 2021	Best Actor	Slamet Rahardjo	Nominated	
Indonesian Film Festival	22 November 2022	Best Supporting Actor	Slamet Rahardjo Djarot	Won	
Indonesian Film Festival	22 November 2022	Best Original Screenplay	Gina S. Noer	Nominated	
