= IDN Pictures =

Indonesian film production company

- Type: Limited liability company
- Industry: Film
- Predecessor: Demi Istri Production (2013-2020)
- Founded: May 25, 2020; 6 years ago
- Headquarters: Jl. Tumaritis No.5B, RT.5/RW.3, Cilandak Barat, Cilandak, Jakarta Selatan 12430, Jakarta, Indonesia
- Area served: Indonesia
- Key people: Fajar Nugros; Susanti Dewi; Winston Utomo; William Utomo
- Owner: IDN
- Website: www.idn.media

IDN Pictures is a technology-based film company located in Indonesia which was launched on May 25, 2020, by IDN, an Indonesian media platform company.

== Background ==
In May 2020, IDN Media, a media company founded by Winston Utomo and William Utomo, officially launched IDN Pictures, a technology-based film company that focuses on stories and data to create film and video content intended to Millennials and Gen Z audiences in Indonesia, after the acquisition of the film company Demi Istri Production. IDN Pictures is led by Director Fajar Nugros and Producer Susanti Dewi.

== History ==
In 2021, IDN Pictures released a short film entitled Udin's Inferno. This film tells the story of a child named Udin who experiences a traumatic incident after reading a comic book that depicts the pain of hell. According to the comic book's depiction, most people tortured in hell are those with tattoos. Meanwhile, Udin's father is a man with tattoos.

On October 13, 2022, IDN Pictures produced their first horror film, named The Womb. The movie tells the story of the Rebo Wekasan ritual which aims to ward off evil and stars several Indonesian actors such as Naysilla Mirdad, Lydia Kandou, and Dimas Anggara.

On December 1, 2022, the studio produced their second horror film titled Qorin. The film tells the story of the heretical ritual of calling qorin. This film stars actors such as Zulfa Maharani, Aghniny Haque, Yusuf Mahardika, and Omar Daniel.

In 2023, IDN Pictures released the film Balada Si Roy, which is an adaptation of the novel of the same name by Gola Gong. Although it was released in 2023, the film has been shown at the JAFF 2022 festival from November 26 to December 3, 2022.

== Production ==
=== Film ===
Year	Title	Director
2021	Udin's Inferno (short film)	Yogi S. Calam
2022	Srimulat: Hil yang Mustahal - Babak Pertama	Fajar Nugros
2022	Horor Keliling	Fajar Nugros
2022	Inang (English: The Womb)	Fajar Nugros
2022	Balada Si Roy	Fajar Nugros
2022	Strangers with Memories (short film)	Fajar Nugros
2022	Qorin	Ginanti Rona
2023	Diary Si Roy (short film)	Yogi S. Calam
2023	Sleep Call	Fajar Nugros
TBA	Sebuah Seni untuk Memahami Kekasih	Jeihan Angga
TBA	Srimulat: Hil yang Mustahal - Babak Kedua	Fajar Nugros
TBA	Ratu Sihir	Fajar Nugros
TBA	Pasar Setan	Wisnu Surya Pratama
TBA	Pesta Dara	
TBA	Sides of a Coin	

=== Web series ===
Year	Title	Director
2022	Kelak Season 2	Yogi S. Calam
2022	Untung Ada Srimulat (English: Luckily there is Srimulat)	Yogi S. Calam
TBA	Adel/Tini	

Information

Not released yet
- TBA : To be announced

== Awards and recognition ==
The film Udin's Inferno received an award in the category for the Best Indonesian Short Film at the 2021 Jakarta Independent Film Festival (JIFF) on 25 October 2021, as well as in the Official Selection category at 2021 Jakarta Film Week on 20 October 2021. Srimulat: Hil yang Mustahal and The Womb received a nomination at the 2022 Indonesian Film Festival (FFI), while The Womb alone received a nomination at the 26th Bucheon International Fantastic Film Festival and aired in Malaysia and Singapore in December 2022.
