= Wafda Saifan =

Indonesian actor (born 1990)

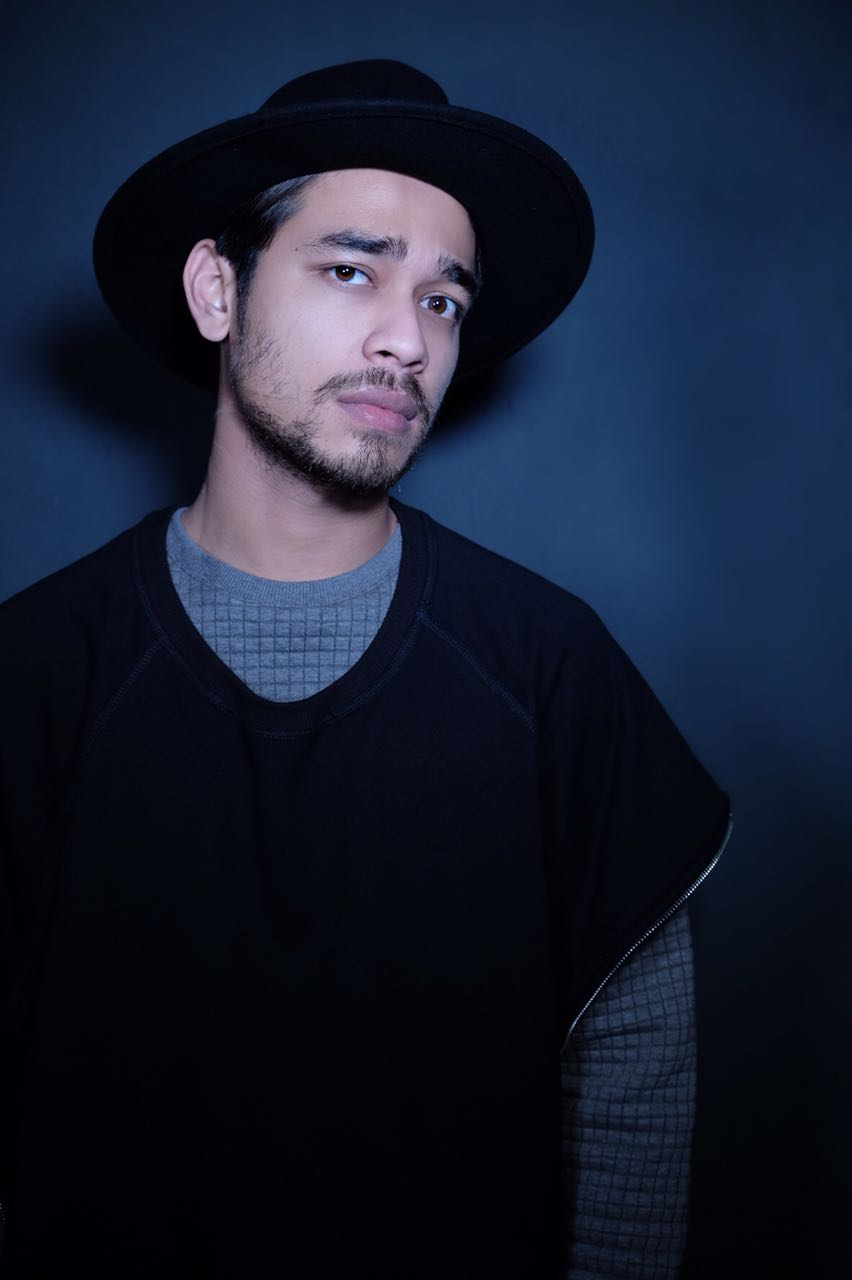
- Wafda Saifan in 2016.
- Born: June 4, 1990 (age 36); Jakarta, Indonesia
- Occupations: Actor, Singer

Wafda Saifan Lubis, or known as Wafda Saifan (born June 4, 1990), is an Indonesian actor and singer.

== Biography ==
Wafda Saifan Lubis was born on June 4, 1990, as the second child of three. He is best known for his portrayal of Jaka in the 2018 drama film Jelita Sejuba: Mencintai Kesatria Negara.

In 2009, Before becoming an actor, he started his career in the entertainment industry as a vocalist. His band often performed at festivals in Jakarta and participated in Piyu Padi's solo album.

He started his career as an actor in 2011 when he played the role as Galaksi on Trans TV's weekly mini series titled Go Go Girls. He played 2 seasons consisting of 22 episodes. Following this role, he took part in several TV series and miniseries such as Tendangan Si Madun Season 3 (2013). In 2018, he made his film debut in Eiffel... I'm In Love 2 as Pero.

After his breakthrough role on Jelita Sejuba: Mencintai Kesatria Negara, he also took part in HBO Asia's miniseries titled Grisse as Bakda. This miniseries aired on November 4, 2018.

Aside from acting, he also pursue his passion in singing. He took part on the Surga yang Tak Dirindukan 2 film soundtrack. Together with Laudya Cynthia Bella, he sang on a track titled "Surga yang Kurindukan".

== Career ==
=== Television ===
Series
Year	Title	Role	Broadcaster
2011	Go Go Girls		Trans TV
2013	Tendangan si Madun Season 3	Aris	MNCTV
2018	Grisse	Bakda	HBO

=== FTV ===
- Mau Dibawa ke Mana

=== Film ===
- Eiffel... I'm in Love 2 (2018)
- Jelita Sejuba: Mencintai Kesatria Negara (2018)
- Lukisan Ratu Kidul (2019)
- Kadet 1947 (2021)
- Home Sweet Loan (2024)
- Pengantin Iblis (2025)
