= Losmen Bu Broto =

2021 drama film

- Theatrical release poster
- Directed by: Ifa Isfansyah; Eddie Cahyono
- Written by: Alim Sudio
- Based on: Losmen by Tatiek Maliyati and Wahyu Sihombing
- Produced by: Andi Boediman; Pandu Birantoro; Robert Ronny
- Starring: Maudy Koesnaedi; Mathias Muchus; Maudy Ayunda; Putri Marino; Baskara Mahendra
- Cinematography: Muhammad Firdaus
- Edited by: Cesa David Luckmansyah; Greg Arya
- Music by: Aghi Narottama; Bemby Gusti; Tony Merle
- Production companies: Ideosource Entertainment; Paragon Pictures; Fourcolours Films; Ideoworks
- Release date: 18 November 2021
- Running time: 113 minutes
- Country: Indonesia
- Language: Indonesian

Losmen Bu Broto (lit. 'Mrs. Broto's Hostel') is a 2021 drama film directed by Ifa Isfansyah and Eddie Cahyono, based on the 1980s television series Losmen. The film stars Maudy Koesnaedi as the title character, along with Mathias Muchus, Maudy Ayunda, Putri Marino, and Baskara Mahendra. It was released in Indonesian theatres on 18 November 2021.

The film was nominated for eight awards at the 2022 Indonesian Film Festival, winning the Best Supporting Actress for Marino.

== Premise ==
Losmen Bu Broto follows the story of the Broto family managing a hostel and the conflicts that arise within it.

== Cast ==
- Mathias Muchus as Mr. Broto. Muchus previously played the role of Tarjo in the original television series.
- Maudy Koesnaedi as Mrs. Broto
- Maudy Ayunda as Jeng Sri
- Putri Marino as Mbak Pur
- Baskara Mahendra as Mas Tarjo
- Danilla Riyadi as Kirana
- Marthino Lio as Jarot

== Production ==
=== Development ===
On 27 October 2020, Paragon Pictures, Ideosource Entertainment, and Ideoworks announced that they would adapt the 1980s TVRI television series, Losmen into a feature film. This marks the second film adaptation of the television series, following Penginapan Bu Broto (1987). Along with the announcement, the cast was revealed, including Mathias Muchus, who starred in the television series as Tarjo. He was set to play the role of Mr. Broto in the adaptation. In October 2020, director Ifa Isfansyah visited Yogyakarta to scout filming locations and cast other roles. In December 2020, it was announced that Maudy Ayunda and Danilla Riyadi were cast in the film.

=== Filming ===
The principal photography began in Kotagede, Yogyakarta in December 2020 and concluded after seventeen days.

== Release ==
Losmen Bu Broto was released in Indonesian theatres on 18 November 2021. It garnered 120,413 admissions during its theatrical run. The film competed in the Indonesian Screen Awards at the 16th Jogja-NETPAC Asian Film Festival, where Marino won the Best Performance.

== Reception ==
Wayan Diananto of Liputan 6 said that Losmen Bu Broto was like a "home-cooked meal that warms the soul". Bavner Donaldo from Cinejour gave a rating of 3.8 out of 5 and said "Losmen in the film is a box of memories, which becomes a silent witness, which hypnotizes me as if I don't care about how the plot will continue". Angga Prasetya of Radio Republik Indonesia described the film as a "show that broke everyone's hearts".

== Sequel ==
A serialized sequel was released by Netflix in 2025, with Mathias Muchus, Maudy Koesnaedi, and Baskara Mahendra reprising their roles.

== Accolades ==
Award	Date	Category	Recipient	Result	Ref.
Jogja-NETPAC Asian Film Festival	4 December 2021	Best Performance	Putri Marino	Won	
Film Pilihan Tempo	20 December 2021	Best Screenplay	Alim Sudio	Nominated	
Film Pilihan Tempo	20 December 2021	Best Actress	Maudy Koesnaedi	Nominated	
Film Pilihan Tempo	20 December 2021	Best Supporting Actress	Putri Marino	Won	
Indonesian Film Festival	22 November 2022	Best Actress	Maudy Koesnaedi	Nominated	
Indonesian Film Festival	22 November 2022	Best Supporting Actress	Putri Marino	Won	
Indonesian Film Festival	22 November 2022	Best Supporting Actress	Maudy Ayunda	Nominated	
Indonesian Film Festival	22 November 2022	Best Adapted Screenplay	Alim Sudio	Nominated	
Indonesian Film Festival	22 November 2022	Best Cinematography	Muhammad Firdaus	Nominated	
Indonesian Film Festival	22 November 2022	Best Theme Song	Mikha Angelo for "Pulang"	Nominated	
Indonesian Film Festival	22 November 2022	Best Theme Song	Maudy Ayunda for "Semakin Jauh"	Nominated	
Indonesian Film Festival	22 November 2022	Best Costume Design	Hagai Pakan	Nominated	
