= Taste (film) =

2021 film

- Poster
- Directed by: Lê Bảo
- Written by: Lê Bảo
- Produced by: Weijie Lai; Thị Phương Thảo Đồng
- Starring: Olegunleko Ezekiel Gbenga; Thi Minh Nga Khuong; Thi Dung Le; Thi Cam Xuan Nguyen; Thi Tham Thin Vu
- Cinematography: Vinh Phúc Nguyễn
- Edited by: Lee Chatametikool
- Production companies: Le Bien Pictures; E&W Films
- Distributed by: Wild Bunch
- Release date: 1 March 2021 (Berlin)
- Running time: 97 minutes
- Countries: Vietnam; Singapore; France; Thailand; Germany; Taiwan
- Languages: Vietnamese; Yoruba

Taste (Vietnamese: Vị) is an internationally co-produced 2021 drama film, directed and written by Lê Bảo in his feature directorial debut. It stars Olegunleko Ezekiel Gbenga as a Nigerian footballer living in Vietnam who lives with four Vietnamese women, played by Thi Minh Nga Khuong, Thi Dung Le, Thi Cam Xuan Nguyen, and Thi Tham Thin Vu.

It premiered at the 71st Berlin International Film Festival, where it won Special Jury Award during the Encounters section.

== Synopsis ==
After being dropped from the football team due to an injury, Bassley, a Nigerian football player, now works as a barber and resides with four women in a slum.

== Cast ==
- Olegunleko Ezekiel Gbenga as Bassley
- Thi Minh Nga Khuong as Mien
- Thi Dung Le as Trang
- Thi Cam Xuan Nguyen as Hanh
- Thi Tham Thin Vu as Thuong

== Production ==
The project was awarded the Most Promising Project at the 2016 Southeast Asian Film Lab. It was also selected and awarded for TFL Co-Production Awards and ARTE Prize at the 2017 TorinoFilmLab.

== Release ==
Taste had its world premiere at the 71st Berlin International Film Festival during its Encounters section on 1 March 2021. It received the Special Jury Award for the section. Wild Bunch acquired international distribution rights to the film.

On 17 May 2021, the production company Le Bien Pictures was administratively fined 35 million Vietnamese đồng for submitting the film to a film festival without a general license. In July 2021, the film was officially banned from release in Vietnam due to a 30-minute nude scene.

== Reception ==
On the review aggregator website Rotten Tomatoes, 86% of 7 critics' reviews are positive, with an average rating of 8.0/10. Metacritic, which uses a weighted average, assigned the film a score of 59 out of 100, based on 4 critics, indicating "mixed or average" reviews.

=== Accolades ===
Awards and nominations for Taste
Award	Date of ceremony	Category	Recipient(s)	Result	Ref.
Berlin International Film Festival	1 March 2021	Encounters Award – Special Jury Prize	Taste	Won	
Taipei Film Festival	7 October 2021	International New Talent Competition	Lê Bảo	Won	
Asia Pacific Screen Awards	11 November 2021	Achievement in Cinematography	Nguyễn Vinh Phúc	Won	
Jogja-NETPAC Asian Film Festival	4 December 2021	Golden Hanoman Award	Taste	Won	
Jogja-NETPAC Asian Film Festival	4 December 2021	NETPAC Award	Taste	Won	
