= 16th Jogja-NETPAC Asian Film Festival =

2021 film festival

- Opening film: A Hero by Asghar Farhadi
- Closing film: First, Second & Third Love by Gina S. Noer
- Location: Yogyakarta, Indonesia
- Founded: 2006
- Awards: Golden Hanoman Award: Taste by Lê Bảo
- No. of films: 128
- Festival date: 27 November–4 December 2021
- Website: jaff-filmfest.org

Jogja-NETPAC Asian Film Festival
- 17th 15th

The 16th Jogja-NETPAC Asian Film Festival was held on 27 November to 4 December 2021 in Yogyakarta, Indonesia. The festival returned to be held offline at the Empire XXI, after a year absence due to the COVID-19 pandemic in Indonesia. The festival partnered with streaming service KlikFilm for online screenings.

A total of 128 films from 33 countries were screened during the festival. Asghar Farhadi's drama film A Hero opened the festival, and it closed with Gina S. Noer's First, Second & Third Love.

The most prestigious award of the festival, Golden Hanoman Award, was presented to Vietnamese drama film Taste by Lê Bảo.

== Official selections ==
=== Opening and closing films ===
English title	Original title	Director(s)	Production country
A Hero (opening film)	قهرمان	Asghar Farhadi	Iran, France
First, Second & Third Love (closing film)	Cinta Pertama, Kedua & Ketiga	Gina S. Noer	Indonesia

=== In competition ===
English title	Original title	Director(s)	Production country
Barbarian Invasion	野蛮人入侵	Tan Chui Mui	Malaysia, China, Hong Kong
Between Heaven and Earth	بين الجنة والأرض	Najwa Najjar	Palestine, Iceland, Luxembourg
A Little Bird Reminds Me	飞越光年	Shi Xin	China
A New Old Play	椒麻堂會	Qiu Jiongjiong	Hong Kong, France
Pebbles	கூழாங்கல்	PS Vinothraj	India
Photocopier	Penyalin Cahaya	Wregas Bhanuteja	Indonesia
Streetwise	街娃儿	Na Jiazuo	China
Taste	Vị	Lê Bảo	Vietnam, France, Germany, Singapore, Taiwan, Thailand
Whether the Weather Is Fine	Kun Maupay Man It Panahon	Carlo Francisco Manatad	Philippines, France, Germany, Indonesia, Qatar, Singapore
White Building	ប៊ូឌីញ ស	Kavich Neang	Cambodia, Qatar, China, France
Vengeance Is Mine, All Others Pay Cash	Seperti Dendam, Rindu Harus Dibayar Tuntas	Edwin	Indonesia
Yuni		Kamila Andini	Indonesia, France, Singapore

=== Asian Perspectives ===
English title	Original title	Director(s)	Production country
Are You Lonesome Tonight?	热带往事	Wen Shipei	China
Aruna Vasudev: Mother of Asian Cinema		Supriya Suri	India
The Coffin Painter	异乡来客	Da Fei	China
Come Here	ใจจำลอง	Anocha Suwichakornpong	Thailand
Drive My Car	ドライブ・マイ・カー	Ryusuke Hamaguchi	Japan
The Flame	Bara	Arfan Sabran	Indonesia
In Front of Your Face	당신얼굴 앞에서	Hong Sang-soo	South Korea
Marapu, Fire & Ritual		Andrew Campbell	Indonesia
Memoria		Apichatpong Weerasethakul	Thailand, China, Colombia, France, Germany, Mexico, Switzerland, United Kingdom, United States
Mentega Terbang		Khairi Anwar	Malaysia
Nine Hills One Valley		Haobam Paban Kumar	India
Nitram		Justin Kurzel	Australia
The Portraits		Dr. Biju	India
Rehana Maryam Noor	রেহানা মরিয়ম নূর	Abdullah Mohammad Saad	Bangladesh, Qatar, Singapore
Sometime, Sometime	一时一时的	Jacky Yeap	Malaysia
Three Strangers	သူစိမ်းသုံးယောက်	Lamin Oo	Myanmar
Tiong Bahru Social Club		Tan Bee Thiam	Singapore
Wheel of Fortune and Fantasy	偶然と想像	Ryusuke Hamaguchi	Japan

=== Classic ===
English title	Original title	Director(s)	Production country
Oldboy (2003)	올드보이	Park Chan-wook	South Korea

=== Retrospective ===
This year's Retrospective program showcased the work of actor Gunawan Maryanto.

English title	Original title	Director(s)	Production country
The Science of Fictions (2019)	Hiruk Pikuk Si Alkisah	Yosep Anggi Noen	Indonesia
Solo, Solitude (2016)	Istirahatlah Kata-Kata	Yosep Anggi Noen	Indonesia

=== JAFF Indonesian Screen Awards ===
English title	Original title	Director(s)
Akhirat: A Love Story		Jason Iskandar
Aum!		Bambang "Ipoenk"
Everyday Is a Lullaby		Putrama Tuta
Just Mom	Ibu	Jeihan Angga
Kadet 1947		Rahabi Mandra, Winaldo Artaraya Swastia
Losmen Bu Broto		Eddie Cahyono, Ifa Isfansyah
Paranoia		Riri Riza
Preman		Randolph Zaini
Teka-Teki Tika		Ernest Prakasa
The Wheel of Life	Perjalanan Pertama	Arief Malinmudo

== Awards ==
- Golden Hanoman Award

Taste by Lê Bảo

- Silver Hanoman Award

Vengeance Is Mine, All Others Pay Cash by Edwin and Yuni by Kamila Andini

- NETPAC Award

Taste by Lê Bảo

- JAFF Indonesian Screen Awards

Best Film: Kadet 1947 by Rahabi Mandra and Winaldo Artaraya Swastia
Best Director: Rahabi Mandra and Winaldo Artaraya Swastia – Kadet 1947

Honorary Mention Best Director: Bambang "Ipoenk" – Aum!

Best Cinematography: Ujel Bausad – Aum!
Best Performance: Putri Marino – Losmen Bu Broto
Best Screenplay: Randolph Zaini – Preman

- Blencong Award

Live in Cloud-Cuckoo Land by Vu Minh Nghia and Pham Hoang Minh Thy
