= Cadet 1947 =

2021 biographical war film

- Theatrical release poster
- Directed by: Rahabi Mandra; Aldo Swastia
- Written by: Rahabi Mandra; Aldo Swastia
- Produced by: Celerina Judisari; Tesadesrada Ryza
- Starring: Bisma Karisma; Kevin Julio; Omara Esteghlal; Marthino Lio; Wafda Saifan; Fajar Nugra; Chicco Kurniawan
- Cinematography: Batara Goempar
- Edited by: Wawan I. Wibowo
- Music by: Hariopati Rinanto
- Production companies: Temata Studios; Legacy Pictures; Screenplay Films
- Release dates: 20 November 2021 (Jakarta); 25 November 2021 (Indonesia)
- Running time: 111 minutes
- Country: Indonesia
- Language: Indonesian

Cadet 1947 (Indonesian: Kadet 1947) is a 2021 Indonesian biographical war film directed and written by Rahabi Mandra and Aldo Swastia. The film was inspired by the first air raid mission of the Indonesian Air Force carried out by cadets on Dutch military targets in Semarang, Salatiga, and Ambarawa on 29 July 1947 during the Police Actions.

The film had its world premiere at the 2021 Jakarta Film Week. It received seven nominations at the 2022 Indonesian Film Festival, winning one for Best Makeup.

Ario Bayu, who starred as the titular character in Soekarno, reprises his role as Indonesia's first president in Cadet 1947.

== Premise ==
Kadet 1947 follows seven cadets as they pursue their ambitions to attack the Dutch defense bases during the 1947 Police Action.

== Cast ==
- Bisma Karisma as Sutardjo Sigit
- Kevin Julio as Mulyono
- Omara Esteghlal as Suharnoko Harbani
- Marthino Lio as Bambang Saptoadji
- Wafda Saifan as Sutardjo
- Fajar Nugra as Kapoet
- Chicco Kurniawan as Dulrachman
- Andri Mashadi as Agustinus Adisoetjipto
- Ario Bayu as Soekarno
- Ibnu Jamil as Halim Perdanakusuma
- Ramadhan Alrasyid as Abdulrachman Saleh
- Mike Lucock as Soerjadi Soerjadarma
- Indra Pacique as Soedirman
- Hardi Fadhillah as Kardi
- Armando Pratama as Basyir Surya
- Givina Lukitadewi as Asih

== Production ==
Principal photography took place in March 2020 in Gunung Kidul, Yogyakarta, but was postponed after three days of filming due to the COVID-19 pandemic. It resumed in September 2020 and concluded in October 2020.

== Release ==
Kadet 1947 was scheduled for release in August 2020 to commemorate the Independence Day, but it was postponed due to the COVID-19 pandemic.

It had its world premiere on 20 November 2021 at the inaugural edition of Jakarta Film Week. It was released theatrically on 25 November 2021. It garnered 97,625 admissions during its theatrical run. It was also screened at the 16th Jogja-NETPAC Asian Film Festival, competing for the Indonesian Screen Awards.

== Accolades ==
Awards and nominations for Kadet 1947
Award	Date of ceremony	Category	Recipient(s)	Result	Ref.
Jakarta Film Week	21 November 2021	Global Feature	Kadet 1947	Nominated	
Jogja-NETPAC Asian Film Festival	4 December 2021	Indonesian Screen Award for Best Film	Kadet 1947	Won	
Jogja-NETPAC Asian Film Festival	4 December 2021	Indonesian Screen Award for Best Director	Rahabi Mandra and Aldo Swastia	Won	
Indonesian Film Festival	22 November 2022	Best Original Screenplay	Rahabi Mandra and Aldo Swastia	Nominated	
Indonesian Film Festival	22 November 2022	Best Cinematography	Batara Goempar	Nominated	
Indonesian Film Festival	22 November 2022	Best Sound	Satrio Budiono and Jantra Suyarman	Nominated	
Indonesian Film Festival	22 November 2022	Best Visual Effects	Satrya Mahardhika	Nominated	
Indonesian Film Festival	22 November 2022	Best Art Direction	Frans X. R. Paat	Nominated	
Indonesian Film Festival	22 November 2022	Best Costume Design	Gemailla Gea Geriantiana	Nominated	
Indonesian Film Festival	22 November 2022	Best Makeup	Eba Sheba	Won	
