= Autobiography (film) =

2022 thriller drama film

- Promotional release poster
- Directed by: Makbul Mubarak
- Written by: Makbul Mubarak
- Produced by: Yulia Evina Bhara
- Starring: Kevin Ardilova; Arswendy Bening Swara
- Cinematography: Wojciech Staroń
- Edited by: Carlo Francisco Manatad
- Music by: Bani Haykal
- Production company: KawanKawan Media
- Distributed by: Alpha Violet; Amazon Prime Video (Southeast Asia)
- Release dates: 2 September 2022 (Venice); 19 January 2023 (Indonesia)
- Running time: 115 minutes
- Country: Indonesia
- Language: Indonesian
- Budget: $362,932

Autobiography is a 2022 Indonesian thriller drama film written and directed by Makbul Mubarak in his directorial debut. It stars Kevin Ardilova and Arswendy Bening Swara. The film had its world premiere at the 79th Venice International Film Festival during the Horizons program on September 2, 2022, where it won the FIPRESCI Award for Best Film in sections other than the main competition. Autobiography won the sole award in Best Original Screenplay category among other seven nominations at the 2022 Indonesian Film Festival. The film was selected as the Indonesian entry for Best International Feature Film at the 96th Academy Awards.

== Plot ==
The film follows Rakib (Kevin Ardilova), who serves as a housekeeper and assistant to a retired general, Purnawinata (Arswendy Bening Swara), who runs an election campaign to be a regent.

== Cast ==
- Kevin Ardilova as Rakib
- Arswendy Bening Swara as Purnawinata
- Yusuf Mahardika as Agus
- Lukman Sardi as Soewito
- Yudi Ahmad Tajudin as Nala
- Rukman Rosadi as Amir
- Haru Sandra as Andra
- Gunawan Maryanto as a construction worker

== Production ==
Mubarak proposed the first draft of the script of Autobiography to Bhara in 2017. The project was selected as a part of the TorinoFilmLab in 2017 and 2018 Ties That Bind.

The principal photography took place in Bojonegoro, East Java, Indonesia.

== Release ==
Alpha Violet acquired worldwide sales rights to the film in July 2022.

Autobiography had its world premiere during the Horizons program at the 79th Venice International Film Festival on 2 September 2022. Its North American premiere was at the Contemporary World Cinema at the 2022 Toronto International Film Festival in September 2022. The film had its Asian premiere during the A Window on Asian Cinema at the 27th Busan International Film Festival on 7 October 2022. Autobiography was also screened at the Adelaide Film Festival on 22 October 2022. It was theatrically released in Indonesia on 19 January 2023 and garnered 33,407 admissions during its run.

Autobiography was distributed by Amazon Prime Video in the Southeast Asia region on 13 April 2023.

== Reception ==
=== Critical response ===
On the review aggregator Rotten Tomatoes website, the film has an approval rating of 91% based on 11 reviews, with an average rating of 7.5/10.

=== Accolades ===
Awards and Nominations for Autobiography
Award	Date of ceremony	Category	Recipient(s)	Result	Ref.
Venice Film Festival	10 September 2022	FIPRESCI Award	Makbul Mubarak	Won	
Venice Film Festival	11 September 2022	Orizzonti Award for Best Film	Makbul Mubarak	Nominated	
Adelaide Film Festival	25 October 2022	Feature Fiction Award	Makbul Mubarak	Won	
Tokyo Filmex	5 November 2022	Grand Prize	Makbul Mubarak	Won	
Asia Pacific Screen Awards	11 November 2022	Best Screenplay	Makbul Mubarak	Won	
Golden Horse Film Festival and Awards	16 November 2022	NETPAC Award	Autobiography	Won	
Golden Horse Film Festival and Awards	16 November 2022	Observation Missions for Asian Cinema Award	Autobiography	Won	
Stockholm International Film Festival	19 November 2022	Bronze Horse for Best Film	Makbul Mubarak	Nominated	
Stockholm International Film Festival	19 November 2022	Best Debut	Makbul Mubarak	Won	
Marrakech International Film Festival	19 November 2022	Best Feature Film	Makbul Mubarak	Nominated	
Marrakech International Film Festival	19 November 2022	Best Performance by an Actor	Arswendy Bening Swara	Won	
Indonesian Film Festival	22 November 2022	Best Picture	Yulia Evina Bhara	Nominated	
Indonesian Film Festival	22 November 2022	Best Director	Makbul Mubarak	Nominated	
Indonesian Film Festival	22 November 2022	Best Actor	Kevin Ardilova	Nominated	
Indonesian Film Festival	22 November 2022	Best Supporting Actor	Arswendy Bening Swara	Nominated	
Indonesian Film Festival	22 November 2022	Best Original Screenplay	Makbul Mubarak	Won	
Indonesian Film Festival	22 November 2022	Best Sound	L.H. Aim Adinegara and Hadrianus Eko	Nominated	
Indonesian Film Festival	22 November 2022	Best Original Song	Sal Priadi for "Ambilkan Bintang"	Nominated	
QCinema International Film Festival	23 November 2022	Best Film	Makbul Mubarak	Won	
QCinema International Film Festival	23 November 2022	Best Director	Makbul Mubarak	Won	
Jogja-NETPAC Asian Film Festival	3 December 2022	Golden Hanoman Award	Autobiography	Won	
Singapore International Film Festival	4 December 2022	Silver Screen Award for Asian Feature Film	Makbul Mubarak	Won	
World Film Festival of Bangkok	12 December 2022	Lotus Awards for Best Film	Makbul Mubarak	Nominated	
World Film Festival of Bangkok	12 December 2022	Jury Prize of Technical Achievement	Carlo Francisco Manatad	Won	
World Film Festival of Bangkok	12 December 2022	Jury Prize of Technical Achievement	Wojciech Staroń	Won	
Film Pilihan Tempo	18 December 2022	Film Pilihan Tempo	Yulia Evina Bhara	Won	
Film Pilihan Tempo	18 December 2022	Best Screenplay	Makbul Mubarak	Nominated	
Film Pilihan Tempo	18 December 2022	Best Director	Makbul Mubarak	Nominated	
Film Pilihan Tempo	18 December 2022	Best Actor	Kevin Ardilova	Won	
Film Pilihan Tempo	18 December 2022	Best Supporting Actor	Arswendy Bening Swara	Won	
Film Pilihan Tempo	18 December 2022	Best Supporting Actor	Rukman Rosadi	Nominated	
Hainan International Film Festival	24 December 2022	Best Film - Asian New Director	Autobiography	Won	
Asian Film Awards	12 March 2023	Best New Director	Makbul Mubarak	Nominated	
Asian Film Awards	12 March 2023	Best Screenplay	Makbul Mubarak	Nominated	
CinemAsia Film Festival	13 March 2023	Jury Special Mention	Autobiography	Won	
Malaysia International Film Festival	29 July 2023	Best Film	Autobiography	Won	
Malaysia International Film Festival	29 July 2023	Best Director	Makbul Mubarak	Won	
Malaysia International Film Festival	29 July 2023	Best Screenplay	Makbul Mubarak	Won	
Malaysia International Film Festival	29 July 2023	Best Actor	Kevin Ardilova	Nominated	
Malaysia International Film Festival	29 July 2023	Best Supporting Actor	Arswendy Bening Swara	Won	
Malaysia International Film Festival	29 July 2023	Best Cinematography	Wojciech Staroń	Won	

== See also ==
- List of submissions to the 96th Academy Awards for Best International Feature Film
- List of Indonesian submissions for the Academy Award for Best International Feature Film
