= Raden Ajeng Srimulat =

Indonesian comedian

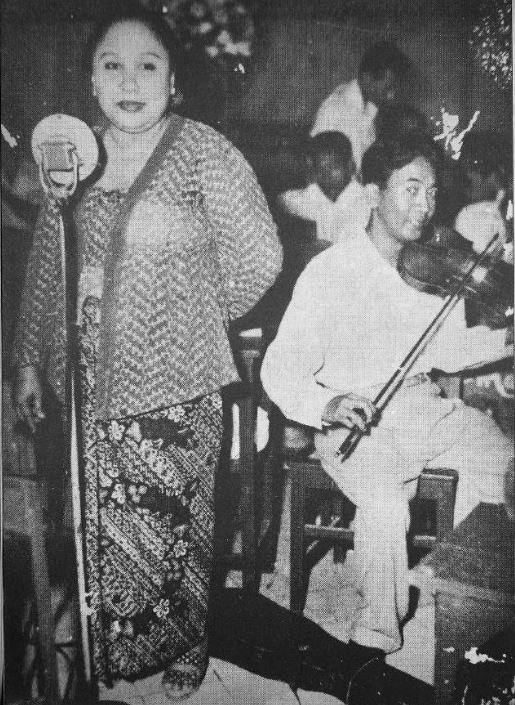
R. A. Srimulat performing with Kerontjong Avond, circa 1949

Raden Ajeng Srimulat (1908–1968, in pre-1947 spelling Raden Adjeng Srimoelat), also known simply as Srimulat, was an Indonesian comedian, actor, singer, and founding member of the popular Srimulat comedy troupe. She was the wife of Teguh Slamet Rahardjo, one of the most famous Indonesian comedians of the postwar era.

== Biography ==
=== Early life ===
Srimulat was born on 7 May 1908, in Botokang village, Klaten Regency, Central Java, Dutch East Indies. She was the daughter of a district head; her parents were named Raden Mas Aryo Tjitrosoma and Raden Ayu Sedah. She was raised in a household where traditional Javanese music and art were a part of her daily life, and her grandfather was a skilled traditional dancer and dalang (puppeteer). She was educated in a Hollandsch-Inlandsche School, a Dutch language school for native Indonesians in Sukoharjo Regency, and then at a technical school in Surakarta. However, her mother died when she was five, and her stepmother eventually stopped allowing her to attend school. Srimulat was soon secluded in the home for extended periods of time. She was then married to a relative of her father at age fifteen. After the lost their first child, and her husband died, she found it intolerable to stay and fled the family home for the nearby city of Yogyakarta.

=== Entertainment career ===
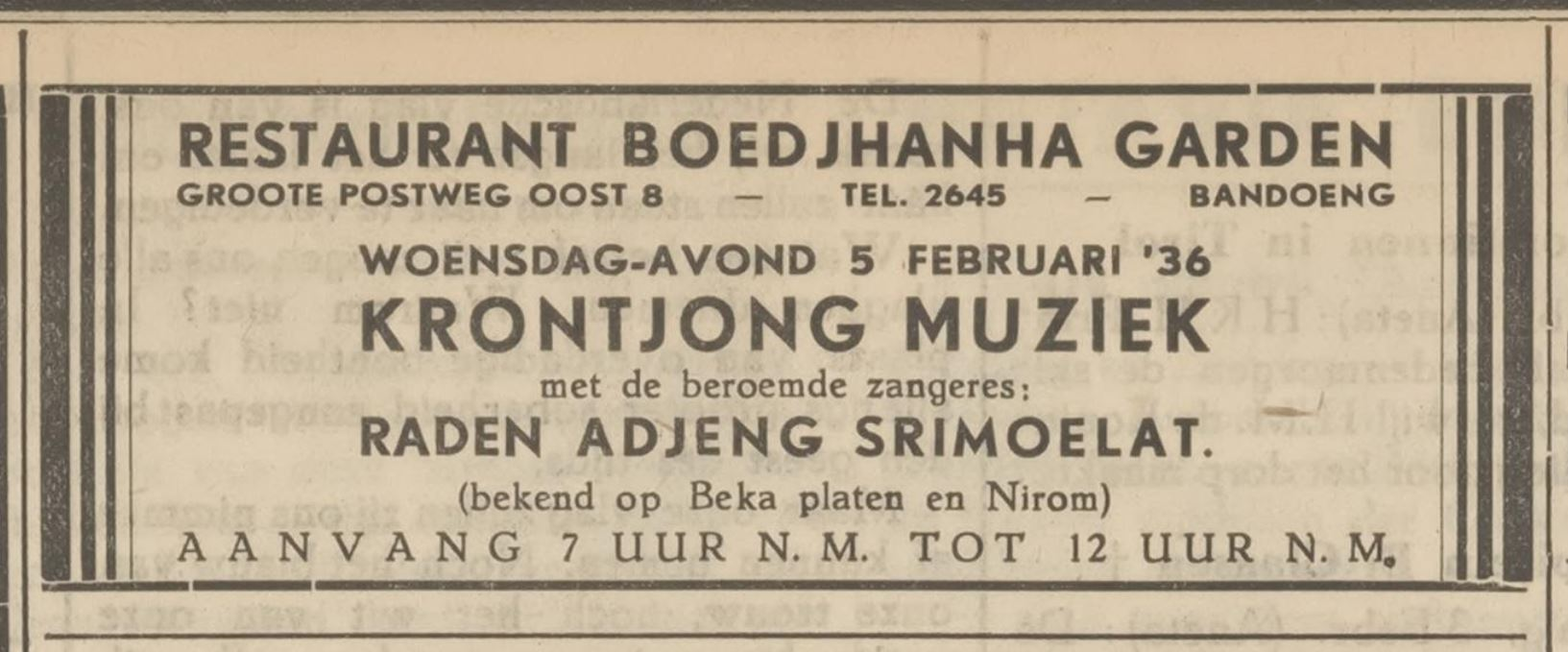
Raden Adjeng Srimoelat 1936 advertisement from De Kourier

After fleeing her home she was accepted into a Wayang kulit (shadow puppet) troupe in Yogyakarta and started to be known as a singer. She then joined a Ketoprak (traditional Javanese theatre) troupe which toured Central Java, and then a Wayang orang group. She gradually became well known as a singer of Keroncong music, a popular genre of the late colonial era, due to her non-stop touring and performances in night markets around Java. During the 1930s she recorded sides of Kroncong music for His Master's Voice. During the Japanese occupation of the Dutch East Indies, Keroncong and comedic plays (Sandiwara) were among the only popular forms of entertainment which could still be performed, and Srimulat continued her rise in popularity through the series Bintang Soerabaia (Stars of Surabaya) and for her musical performances. She met her future husband Teguh Slamet Rahardjo (born Kho Tjien Tiong), then a musician in a Keroncong orchestra, in 1946 and they began to perform together regularly, to the point that he adopted her name as his stage name: Teguh Srimulat. They were married in 1950. In 1950 they established their touring troupe, called variously Kerontjong Avond, Srimulat Review and Gema-Malem Srimulat; they performed most often in Surabaya. They also regularly performed in night markets around Java.

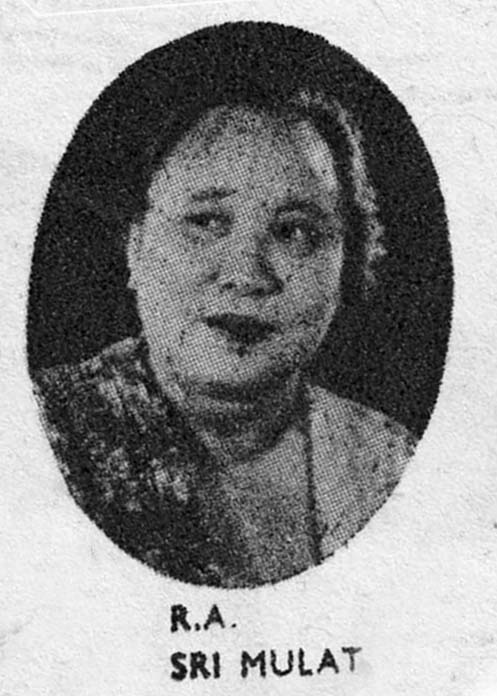
RA Sri Mulat, circa 1950

Initially the focus of their troupe was on music, with some comedy, but in the late 1950s they began to turn increasingly towards comedy and especially Slapstick comedy. Srimulat also appeared in some films during this era, including Saputangan (1949), Bintang Surabaja (1951), Putri Sala (1953), Sebatang Kara (1954) and Radja Karet dari Singapura (1956). In the early 1960s the touring troupe was re-launched as Aneka Ria Srimulat with a home stage in Jakarta and regular appearances in Surabaya, Surakarta and Semarang. As the troupe became much larger a number of its actors became well-known comedians in their own right, including Johni Gudel, Edy Geyol, Herry Koko, Gepeng, and Dandempo.

Srimulat died of Diabetes in December 1968. The comedy troupe continued to operate under the name Srimulat and the name itself came to be identified with their brand of absurd slapstick comedy.
