= Telisik =

Studio album by Danilla
- Released: 3 March 2014
- Recorded: 2012–2013
- Studio: Menyentak Studio, Jakarta; Tesla Manaf Studio, Bandung; ARU Studio, Bandung
- Genre: Jazz; easy listening; bossa nova
- Length: 48:37
- Label: Orion Records
- Producer: Lafa Pratomo

Danilla chronology
Telisik (2014)	Lintasan Waktu (2017)

Professional ratings
Review scores
Source	Rating
Rolling Stone Indonesia	4/5 stars

Telisik is the debut album by Indonesian singer Danilla, released by Orion Records on March 3, 2014. Most of the songs on Telisik were written by Lafa Pratomo who also produced. The album mixes the sounds and arrangements of jazz, bossa nova, and traditional Indonesian music with minimalist, laid-back productions.

Telisik produced four singles: "Buaian", "Ada di Sana", "Berdistraksi", and "Terpaut Oleh Waktu". At the end of the year Rolling Stone Indonesia named it the 18th "Best Indonesian Albums of 2014."

== Background and recording ==
Danilla met Lafa Pratomo in 2012 through some friend. Lafa, a musician/producer, took her under his wings and wrote materials for her to sing. This album could easily be attributed to Lafa as he wrote most of the songs, and later also producing the album. As Danilla so humbly put it, she was "just [a] messenger for his songs". The only writing credits for the singer were on "Oh No! (Trembling Theory)" and "Junko Furuta", which she shared with the producer.

The recording took one and a half-year to finish, with "Junko Furuta" being the longest to complete, taking up three to four months of writing and recording. For promotion, Danilla and Lafa would often record some two to four songs, bootleg it into 50 CDs that they had bought out of their own pockets, and give them out for free at her shows. They later found it easier to promote her album through the internet by uploading it to streaming services such as SoundCloud.

== Track listing ==
All tracks are written by Lafa Pratomo, except where noted

No.	Title	Length
1.	"Penutupan"	0:17
2.	"Ada di Sana"	3:19
3.	"Senja di Ambang Pilu"	4:58
4.	"Buaian"	4:02
5.	"Reste avec moi" (Ika Ratih Poespa, Denny Arantika)	3:34
6.	"Wahai Kau"	4:15
7.	"Terpaut Oleh Waktu"	4:15
8.	"Oh No! (Trembling Theory)" (Lafa, Danilla)	4:01
9.	"Junko Furuta" (Lafa, Danilla)	4:20
10.	"Berdistraksi"	3:32
11.	"Bilur"	4:50
12.	"My Favorite Things" (Richard Rodgers)	7:03
13.	"Pendahuluan"	0:18

== Personnel ==
- Danilla Riyadi – vocals, melodica
- Lafa Pratomo – vocals, guitar
- Christ Stanley – piano
- Aldi Nada Permana – piano
- Edward Julu Hosea – drums
- Jalu Rohanda – bass
- Galang Perdhana – bass
- Dani Kurnia – cello
- Brury Effendy – trumpet
