= Pengantin Iblis =

2025 Indonesian horror film

- Theatrical release poster
- Directed by: Azhar Kinoi Lubis
- Written by: Lele Laila
- Produced by: Andi Suryanto; Marcella Daryanani
- Starring: Taskya Namya; Wafda Saifan; Arla Ailani; Givina Lukita; Bukie B. Mansyur; Ratna Riantiarno; Elly D. Luthan; Shaqueena Medina Lukman
- Cinematography: Muhammad Firdaus
- Music by: Aghi Narottama; Tony Merle
- Production company: Lyto Pictures
- Release date: January 29, 2025
- Running time: 105 minutes
- Country: Indonesia
- Language: Indonesian

Pengantin Iblis is a 2025 Indonesian supernatural horror film directed by Azhar Kinoi Lubis, written by Lele Laila, and produced by Lyto Pictures. The film stars Taskya Namya, Wafda Saifan, and Arla Lailani, and is about a mother's desperate sacrifice to save her daughter.

The film had its world premiere at the Gala Premiere in Jakarta on 22 January 2025, premiered on Indonesian theatres on 29 January, and on Netflix on 5 June.

== Plot ==
Ranti is the mother of Nina, her beloved daughter who has been disabled since birth. Her husband Bowo is a fisherman who is frequently away at sea, so Ranti sells chicken at the market to support the family. She struggles to balance work and domestic responsibilities while enduring the constant demands of her mother-in-law, whom she resents because Bowo does not defend her.

One day, Nina suffers a tragic accident and is left in critical condition, requiring immediate surgery. Bowo is at sea and cannot be contacted, while the operation is too expensive and Ranti's in-laws refuse to help. At the hospital, an old woman offers Ranti a way to heal Nina. Desperate because of the cost and the operation's low chance of success, Ranti agrees to become the Demon's Bride. A ritual is performed on Kliwon Tuesday, during which she is married to a demon. Afterwards, Nina is suddenly healed without surgery.

Strange events then occur around the house. Ranti frequently takes baths at midnight and appears to be in two places simultaneously. When her sister-in-law Siti records her midnight baths and threatens to release the footage, Ranti becomes violent. She confronts Siti with a knife at the market, kills her, removes her unborn child from her womb, and buries her in the backyard.

Ranti returns to the old woman for help, but she explains that the demon has already become one with her and that their marriage will last for life. Ranti continues killing, murdering her brother-in-law Bayu, her mother-in-law, and eventually Bowo. Nina tells her mother that she would rather become disabled again if it would allow Ranti to return to normal.

Ranti regains control of herself and orders Gita to take Nina away. She then sets herself on fire, while Gita leaves with Nina as the house burns to ashes.

Nina subsequently loses control of her legs again. Gita, meanwhile, finds Ranti's red shirt in the wardrobe.

== Cast ==
- Taskya Namya as Ranti
- Wafda Saifan as Bowo, Ranti's husband
- Arla Lailani as Gita, Ranti's sister-in-law
- Shaqueena Medina Lukman as Nina, Ranti's daughter
- Bukie B. Mansyur as Bayu, Ranti's brother-in-law
- Givina Lukita Dewi as Siti, Ranti's sister-in-law
- Ratna Riantiarno as Mrs. Dian
- Elly Lutan as Mrs. Utari

== Video game adaptation ==
A video game adaptation by Lyto Games was released for PC and mobile on 26 December 2024. With the film's 29 January wide release, this earns the film a MURI record as the first Indonesian horror film adapted into a video game.
