= The Womb =

2022 horror film

- Theatrical release poster
- Indonesian: Inang
- Directed by: Fajar Nugros
- Written by: Deo Mahameru
- Produced by: Susanti Dewi
- Starring: Naysila Mirdad; Dimas Anggara; Rukman Rosadi; Lydia Kandou
- Cinematography: Wendy Aga
- Edited by: Wawan I. Wibowo
- Music by: Aghi Narottama; Bemby Gusti; Tony Merle
- Production company: IDN Pictures
- Release dates: 7 July 2022 (Bucheon); 13 October 2022 (Indonesia)
- Running time: 98 minutes
- Country: Indonesia
- Language: Indonesian

The Womb (Indonesian: Inang) is a 2022 horror film directed by Fajar Nugros and written by Deo Mahameru. It stars Naysila Mirdad, Dimas Anggara, Rukman Rosadi, and Lydia Kandou.

The film had its world premiere at the 26th Bucheon International Fantastic Film Festival on 7 July 2022. It was theatrically released in Indonesia on 13 October 2022.

== Premise ==
A woman agrees to let an old couple takes care of her and her unborn child.

== Cast ==
- Naysila Mirdad as Wulan
- Dimas Anggara as Bergas
- Lydia Kandou as Eva Santoso
- Rukman Rosadi as Agus Santoso

== Production ==
The Womb was announced on 1 July 2021, along with the cast announcement including mother and daughter Lydia Kandou and Naysila Mirdad. Principal photography took place around Mount Salak, West Java, Indonesia for three weeks and wrapped in September 2021.

== Release ==
The Womb had its world premiere at the 26th Bucheon International Fantastic Film Festival on 7 July 2022, competing for Bucheon Choice Features. It was theatrically released in Indonesia on 13 October 2022. It garnered 828,168 admissions during its theatrical run.

Netflix acquired its distribution rights, releasing it on 16 February 2023.

== Accolades ==
Award / Film Festival	Date of ceremony	Category	Recipient(s)	Result	Ref.
Indonesian Film Festival	22 November 2022	Best Supporting Actor	Rukman Rosadi	Nominated	
Indonesian Film Festival	22 November 2022	Best Editing	Wawan I. Wibowo	Nominated	
