= Guðmundur Arnar Guðmundsson =

Icelandic film director and screenwriter

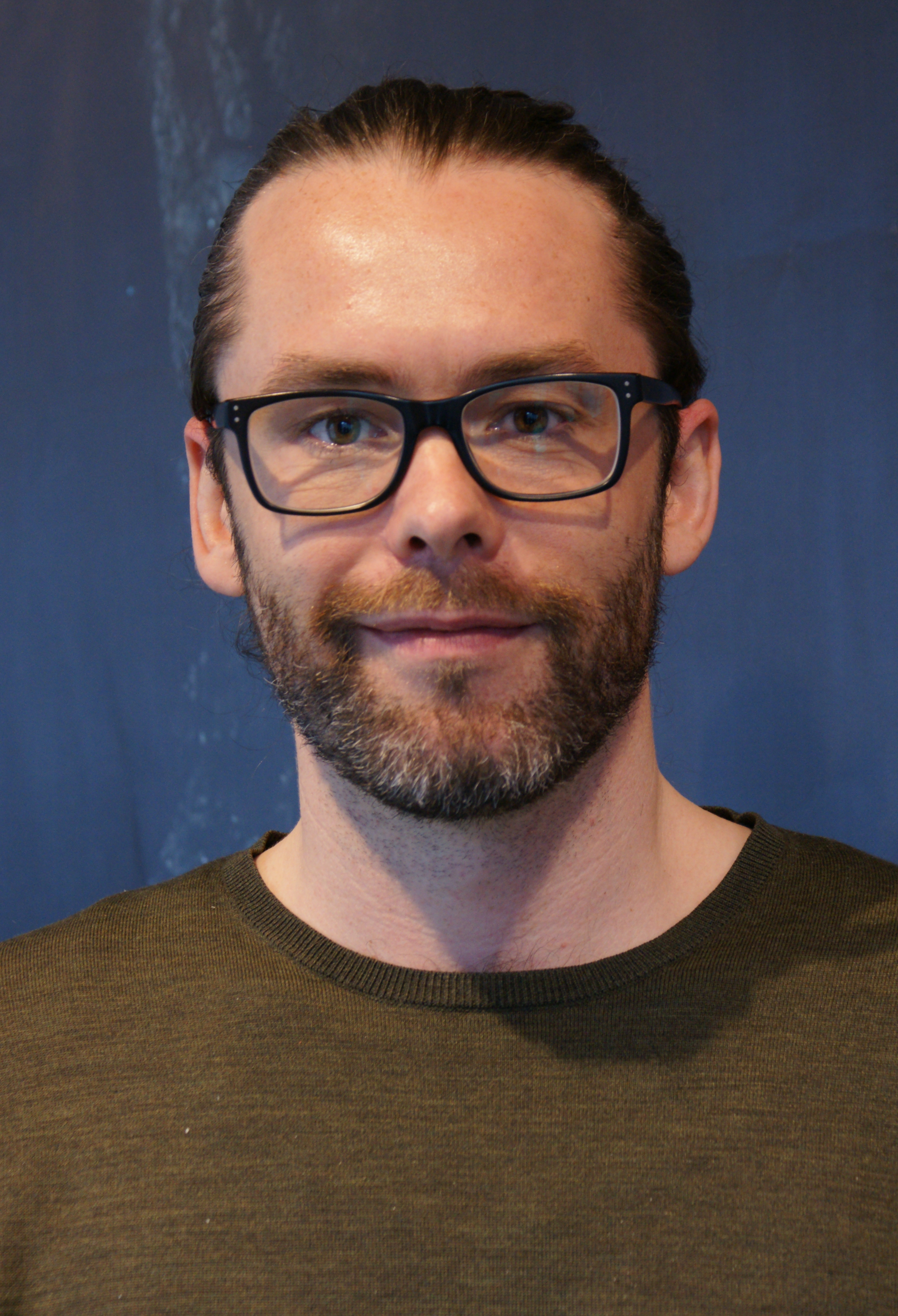
- Guðmundur at the Gothenburg Film Festival in 2017
- Born: 25 February 1982 (age 43)
- Occupations: film director; screenwriter
- Awards: Edda Award for Best Director

Guðmundur Arnar Guðmundsson (born 25 February 1982) is an Icelandic film director and screenwriter.

== Filmography ==
- Þröng sýn (2005) (Short)
- Jeffrey & Beta (2008) (Short)
- Hvalfjörður (2013) (Short)
- Ártún (2014) (Short)
- Heartstone (Hjartasteinn) (2016)
- Berdreymi (2022)
