= Stealing Raden Saleh =

2022 Indonesian heist film

- Theatrical Malaysia release poster
- Directed by: Angga Dwimas Sasongko
- Written by: Angga Dwimas Sasongko; Husein M. Atmodjo
- Produced by: Cristian Imanuell
- Starring: Iqbaal Ramadhan; Angga Yunanda; Rachel Amanda; Umay Shahab; Aghniny Haque; Ari Irham
- Cinematography: Bagoes Tresna Aji
- Edited by: Hendra Adhi Susanto
- Music by: Abel Huray
- Production companies: Visinema Pictures; Jagartha; Blibli; Astro Shaw
- Distributed by: Astro Shaw
- Release dates: 25 August 2022 (Indonesia); 22 September 2022 (Malaysia)
- Running time: 154 minutes
- Country: Indonesia
- Language: Indonesian
- Budget: Rp2 billion (US$1.28 million)

Stealing Raden Saleh (Indonesian: Mencuri Raden Saleh) is a 2022 Indonesian heist action thriller film directed by Angga Dwimas Sasongko and written by Sasongko and Husein M. Atmodjo. The film features an ensemble cast, consists of: Iqbaal Ramadhan, Angga Yunanda, Rachel Amanda, Umay Shahab, Aghniny Haque and Ari Irham. The film follows a group who plans a heist of The Arrest of Pangeran Diponegoro painting by Indonesian artist Raden Saleh.

== Cast ==
- Iqbaal Ramadhan as Piko Subiakto "The Forger"
- Angga Yunanda as Yusuf Hamdan / Ucup "The Hacker"
- Aghniny Haque as Sarah "The Brute"
- Rachel Amanda as Fella "The Negotiator"
- Umay Shahab as Gofar "The Handyman"
- Ari Irham as Tuktuk "The Driver"
- Tio Pakusadewo as Permadi, former President
- Dwi Sasono as Budiman Subiakto, Piko's father
- Atiqah Hasiholan as Dini, the National Gallery curator
- Ganindra Bimo as Arman
- Andrea Dian as Sita
- Muhammad Khan as Rama, Permadi's son
- Reza Hilman as Reza, the party guest
- Joshua Pandelaki as Marwan, Gofar and Tuktuk's father
- Ratna Riantiarno as Sarah's grandmother
- Jenny Zhang as Fella's mother
- Tegar Satrya as Gito

== Production ==
=== Conception ===
The idea of Stealing Raden Saleh was conceived by Sasongko after his interest in paintings and the work of Indonesian painter Raden Saleh. The film was first announced during the Visinema Pictures' virtual press conference on 18 November 2020, along with then-upcoming projects.

=== Casting ===
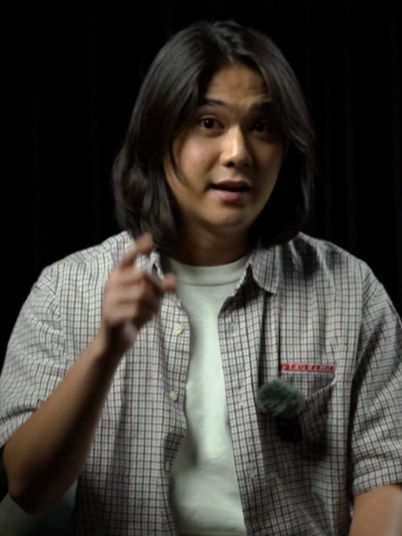
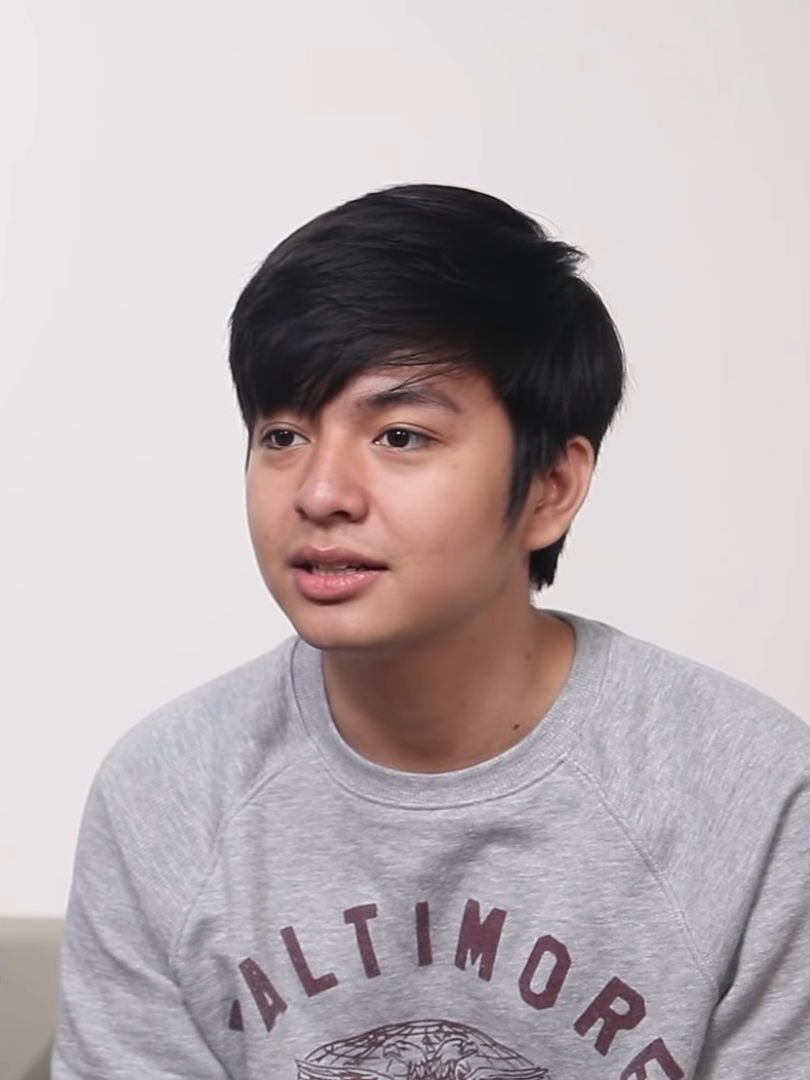
Iqbaal Ramadhan (left) and Angga Yunanda (right) played as main casts of the film.

In June 2021, Ramadhan, Yunanda, Haque, Amanda, Shahab and Irham were announced to star. In May 2022, Visinema Pictures revealed the film's first teaser.

For success in the film, some of the casts did some exercises and changing their appearance. Astro Gempak reveals that Umay Shahab has to lost about 5 kg of weight and cutting his hair being bald for Gofar character who was a handyman.

Principal photography began on 23 October 2021 in Jakarta, Surabaya, Malang and Pasuruan. Aghinny Haque told to Astro Gempak that fighting scene with high-heeled shoe was one of the challenging scene besides that she had to fight with 5 men.

== Release ==
Stealing Raden Saleh was theatrically released in Indonesia on 25 August 2022. The film was also released in Malaysia on 22 September 2022 with Astro Shaw as official distributor for Malaysian market.

The film garnered 2.3 million admission during its theatrical run and it became the seventh highest-grossing Indonesian film of 2022 as of 27 October.

== Accolades ==
Award	Date	Category	Recipient	Result	Ref.
Jakarta Film Week	16 October 2022	Direction Award	Stealing Raden Saleh	Won	
Indonesian Film Festival	22 November 2022	Best Picture	Cristian Imanuell	Nominated	
Indonesian Film Festival	22 November 2022	Best Director	Angga Dwimas Sasongko	Nominated	
Indonesian Film Festival	22 November 2022	Best Original Screenplay	Angga Dwimas Sasongko and Husein M. Atmojo	Nominated	
Indonesian Film Festival	22 November 2022	Best Cinematography	Bagoes Tresna Adji	Nominated	
Indonesian Film Festival	22 November 2022	Best Film Editing	Hendra Adhi Susanto	Nominated	
Indonesian Film Festival	22 November 2022	Best Visual Effects	After Lab	Nominated	
Indonesian Film Festival	22 November 2022	Best Sound	Aufa R. Ariaputra and Satrio Budiono	Nominated	
Indonesian Film Festival	22 November 2022	Best Original Score	Abel Huray	Nominated	
Indonesian Film Festival	22 November 2022	Best Production Design	Yusuf Kaisuku	Nominated	
Indonesian Film Festival	22 November 2022	Favorite Film	Stealing Raden Saleh	Won	
