= Beautiful Beings =

2022 Icelandic film

- International promotional poster
- Icelandic: Berdreymi
- Directed by: Guðmundur Arnar Guðmundsson
- Screenplay by: Guðmundur Arnar Guðmundsson
- Produced by: Anton Máni Svansson
- Starring: Birgir Dagur Bjarkason; Áskell Einar Pálmason; Viktor Benóný Benediktsson; Snorri Rafn Frímannsson
- Cinematography: Sturla Brandth Grøvlen
- Edited by: Andri Steinn Guðjónsson
- Music by: Kristian Eidnes Andersen
- Production companies: Join Motion Pictures; Bastide Films; Film i Väst; Hobab; Motor; Negativ
- Release dates: 11 February 2022 (Berlin); 22 April 2022 (Iceland)
- Running time: 123 minutes
- Countries: Iceland; Denmark; Sweden; Netherlands; Czech Republic
- Language: Icelandic
- Box office: $178,839

Beautiful Beings (Icelandic: Berdreymi) is a 2022 Icelandic coming-of-age drama film written and directed by Guðmundur Arnar Guðmundsson. Set in the suburbs of Reykjavík during the 2000s, the film focuses on a group of teenage boys and the violence that surrounds them.

The film had its world premiere at the Panorama section of the 72nd Berlin International Film Festival on 30 September 2022, it was theatrically released in Iceland on 22 April.

It was announced as Iceland's submission for the Academy Award for Best International Feature Film at the 95th Academy Awards.

== Plot ==
The film opens with teenage Balli being bullied at school and attacked by a group of boys on his way home. After fighting back, he is struck in the face with a tree branch, leaving him injured and requiring him to wear a mask. In the evening his schoolmate Addi and his mother watch a news segment mentioning the attack, the next day he befriends Balli along with his other friends Siggi, a wild and impulsive boy, and Konni, nicknamed "The Animal" due to his love for fighting and womanizing.

After Konni learns that an older boy, Jónas, intends to beat him for kissing his girlfriend, he asks Addi for help and together they attack Jónas at a gas station. The boys subsequently spend time at Balli's home, where he reveals that his father is dead, his stepfather is imprisoned, and his mother and sister are frequently absent. Addi narrates that Siggi and Konni have abusive fathers, at home his clairvoyant mother shares her dreams and their perceived meanings with him which Addi dismisses.

Together the boys prank a strange boy from the neighborhood named Danni, by tricking him into snorting flour by telling him it's cocaine. When Danni claims to have sexually assaulted Balli, the others initially laugh, but Konni beats him after Balli begins to vehemently deny the allegation. Later, Konni assaults partygoers after one of them spits on a girl accompanying them on a night out, and Addi reluctantly becomes involved while trying to stop him. Afterwards Addi tells Konni that he no longer wants to fight or hurt others.

After Jónas and several older boys attack the group, Konni enlists the help of an older gang led by Símon. That night at a party held at Balli's house, Addi has a psychic premonition and discovers Símon and his friend sexually assaulting an incapacitated Konni. He stops them by threatening them with Balli's stepfather's shotgun. The next day Konni denies that anything happened and becomes hostile when Addi talks about it. That night Addi dreams about Konni jumping off a building while holding onto him, which he interprets as another premonition.

When Balli's stepfather is released from prison Addi dreams that he is abusing Balli and his sister, which Balli reluctantly confirms after he asks him about it. Konni decides that the group will confront his stepfather despite Balli's objections. During the confrontation, the stepfather fights back and Addi strikes him in the back of the head with a baseball bat, leaving him in a vegetative state.

The boys are taken into custody and questioned. Addi's mother initially encourages him to cooperate, but tells him to remain silent after learning that he caused the injury. Balli takes responsibility for the attack and is placed in foster care. In the final scene, Addi visits Balli, who is doing much and thanks Addi for being his friend.

== Cast ==
- Birgir Dagur Bjarkason as Addi
- Áskell Einar Pálmason as Balli
- Viktor Benóný Benediktsson as Konni
- Snorri Rafn Frímannsson as Siggi
- Aníta Briem as Guðrún (Addi's mother)
- Ísgerður Elfa Gunnarsdóttir as Hulda (Balli's mother)
- Ólafur Darri Ólafsson as Svenni
- Kristín Ísold Jóhannesdóttir as Hófí (Balli's sister)
- Blær Hinriksson as Símon
- Theodór Pálsson as Danni Braindead
- Kamilla Guðrún Lowen as Anna

== Reception ==
On the review aggregator website Rotten Tomatoes, 82% of 22 critics' reviews are positive. Metacritic, which uses a weighted average, assigned the film a score of 58 out of 100, based on 9 critics, indicating "mixed or average" reviews.

In his review on Los Angeles Times, Robert Abele wrote that "the pacing is sometimes shaggy, and the boys’ motivations are occasionally mysterious, but Guðmundsson's young actors are magnetic in a physical, haunted way". At The Guardian, Peter Bradshaw rated it 3/5 of its grade saying that "Beautiful Beings is shot with real style, with very good performances, but the cliched and consequence-free violence is a flaw."

== Awards ==
List of Accolades
Film Festival	Award	Recipient(s)	Result
2021 Biografilm Festival	Premio della Critica Italiana SNCCI	Beautiful Beings	Won
