= Danilla Riyadi =

Indonesian singer (born 1990)

Danilla
- Born: Danilla Jelita Poetri Riyadi; February 12, 1990 (age 36); Jakarta, Indonesia
- Genres: Jazz; easy listening; indie pop
- Instruments: Piano; guitar; melodica
- Years active: 2010–present
- Labels: demajors; Orion
- Website: danillaofficial.com

Danilla Riyadi (born February 12, 1990), known professionally simply as Danilla, is an Indonesian singer and actress. As a singer she has released four studio albums: Telisik (2014), Lintasan Waktu (2017), POP SEBLAY (2022) and Candramawa (2026); and one EP: Fingers (2019). The reception to her debut album resulted in her being named the 2014's "Best New Act" by Rolling Stone Indonesia.

== Life and career ==
=== 1990–2008: Early life ===
Danilla Jelita Poetri Riyadi was born on February 12, 1990, in Jakarta. Her family has a long history in local music scene, as the singer of Chinese-Indonesian descent is the daughter of jazz singer Ika Ratih Poespa, and her uncle is the musician and composer Dian Pramana Putra, a contemporary of Fariz RM and Deddy Dhukun. Danilla grew up getting to some level of familiarity with classical music, kroncong, bossa nova, and jazz while her parents would often play the records of João Gilberto, Billie Holiday, Diana Krall, and Fourplay at home. Though brought up in a musical home, Danilla felt she didn't necessarily have the right voice to become a singer although her mother and uncle continuously pursued her to take up a career in music. In her adolescence she was more interested in playing horror video games such as Silent Hill and Resident Evil, a hobby that caused her to fall behind in school.

At 17 years old, Danilla was offered an opportunity to get into the music industry by filmmaker and owner of Orion Records, Richard Buntario, an acquaintance of her uncle. Richard proposed for her to record a cover album of already popular songs, similar to that of the career of Filipino singer Sabrina, but young Danilla felt it wasn't something she wanted to do.

=== 2010–2016: Career beginnings and Telisik ===
While studying in Universitas Persada Indonesia YAI Danilla was involved in a band called "Orca", an alternative band mostly covering British artists such as Keane and Radiohead. Now more open to the prospects of a career in music, she again met with Richard Buntario who took her to meet future collaborator Lafa Pratomo. At the time Lafa was looking to find the right voice for a song he had composed, "Terpaut Oleh Waktu", and Danilla was looking for someone to collaborate with. Both agreed to team up, and Lafa gave the singer some of his unused materials to use—later also produced her debut album. After one and a half years of recording, Telisik was released in March 2014 by Orion Records, with demajors—one of Indonesia's most recognizable independent labels—distributing it. The album did not chart but was met with critical acclaim, placing at number No. 18 on Rolling Stone Indonesia's Albums of the Year. Danilla released four singles from the album: "Buaian", "Ada di Sana", "Berdistraksi", and "Terpaut Oleh Waktu".

=== 2016–2025: Lintasan Waktu and POP SEBLAY ===
Her second album, Lintasan Waktu, was released in 2017 with two singles accompanying it: "Kalapuna" and "Aaa". The album was nominated for Indonesian Choice Awards 2018's Album of the Year.

=== 2026–present: Candramawa ===
On 5 June 2026, Riyadi's fourth album, Candramawa, was released. The album's name comes from a rare black and white cat in Javanese tradition that symbolises duality and balance. Riyadi recorded the album in Bantul, Yogyakarta, and was co-produced by Lafa Pratomo and Otta Tarega.

== Musical styles ==
The singer's first album mixed elements of bossa nova, jazz, and traditional Indonesian pop music, with her distinctive alto vocal and laid-back singing style, which would later prove to become one of her main strengths. On her second album, on which Danilla eventually adapted the role of main songwriter, she could finally play the type of music she's always more enthusiastic toward. Her sophomore album Lintasan Waktu saw the singer straying away from the friendlier sounds and minimalistic productions of her first album—without abandoning it completely—to a more modern pop sounds of R&B and psychedelic music, adding synthesizer and electric guitar to the arrangements.

She has cited several bossa nova and jazz artists such as Antônio Carlos Jobim, João Gilberto, Frank Sinatra, Billie Holiday, Astrud Gilberto, Ella Fitzgerald and Diana Krall to be her influences. She also draws inspirations from various contemporary pop and rock musicians like Radiohead, Jay-Jay Johanson, Sophie Ellis-Bextor, Portishead and Coldplay.

== Discography ==
=== Studio albums ===
- Telisik (2014)
- Lintasan Waktu (2017)
- POP SEBLAY (2022)
- Candramawa (2026)

=== Extended plays ===
- Fingers (2019)

=== Other appearances ===
- Elvyn G Masassya - Reinterpretasi Mahakarya (2014)
- Various Artists - Green Voice Indonesia (2015)
- Various Artists - Aransemen Ulang Lagu Orisinil dari Film - Tiga Dara (2016)
- Rock N Roll Mafia - Unison (EP) (2018)
- Seringai - Seperti Api (2018)
- Tigapagi - Tidur Bersama (Single) (2018)
- Various Artists - Detik Waktu: Perjalanan Karya Cipta Candra Darusman (2018)
- Mantra Vutura - Human (2019)
- Daramuda - Pertigaan (EP) (2020)
- Daramuda - Selamat Tinggal (Single) (2020)
- Iwan Fals - Pun Aku (2021)
- Various Artists - Losmen Bu Broto (Original Motion Picture Soundtrack) (2021)
