= Marthino Lio =

Indonesian actor (born 1989)

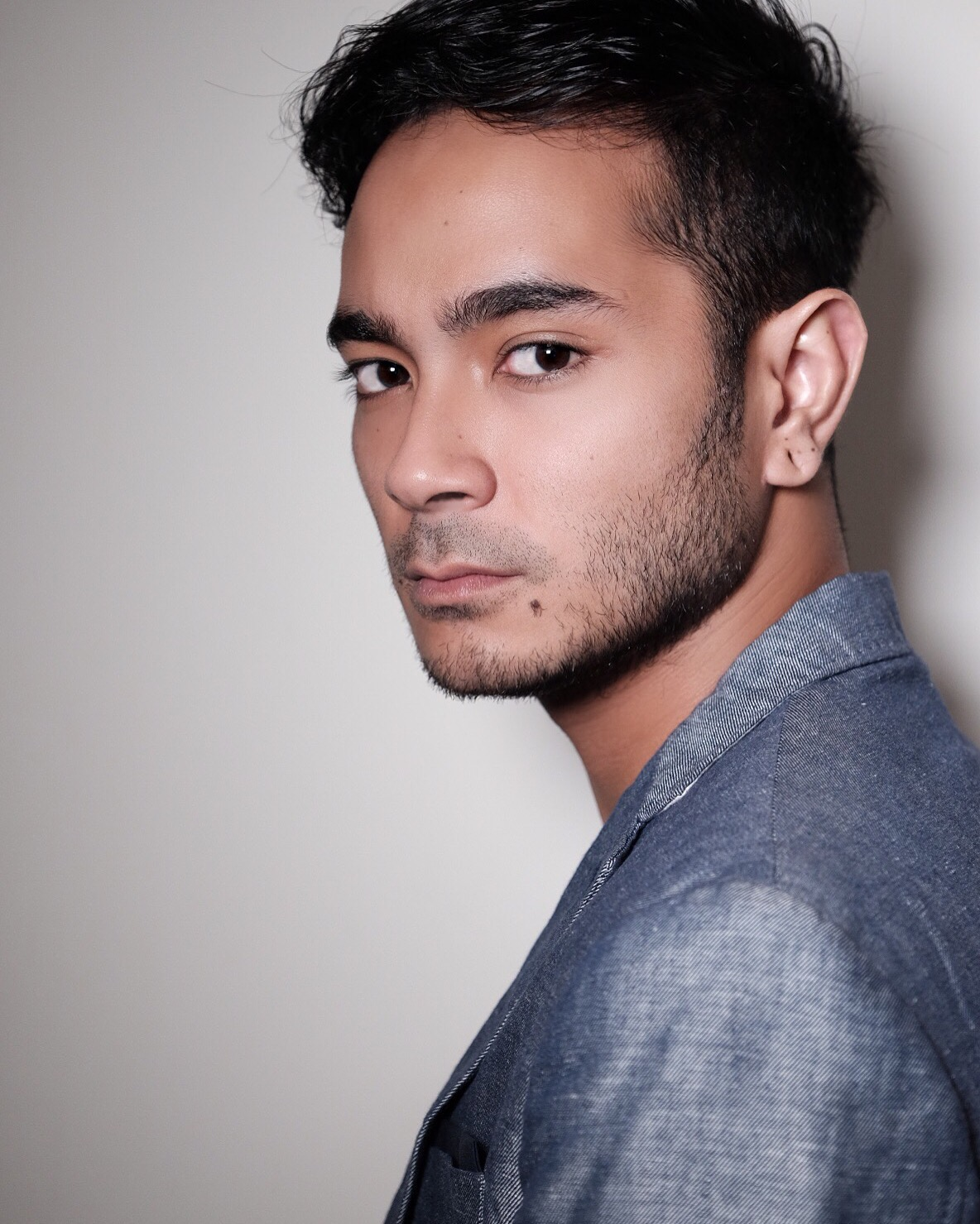
- Born: Guiliano Marthino Lio; 26 January 1989 (age 37); Surabaya, East Java, Indonesia
- Other name: Lio
- Occupations: Actor; singer; model
- Spouse: Anita Fauziah
- Children: Gabriel
- Musical career
- Genre: pop
- Instrument: Vocals
- Years active: 2004–present
- Label: Aquarius Musikindo

Guiliano Marthino Lio (born 26 January 1989), also known as Marthino Lio, is an Indonesian actor.

== Biography ==
He started his career in the entertainment industry as a model in 2004. He was offered parts on various soap operas and movies. He appeared on several films such as The Guys, as Rene (2017); Eiffel... I'm in Love 2, as Adam (2018); Sultan Agung: Tahta, perjuangan, Cinta, as Raden Mas Rangsang / Sultan Agung Muda (2018) and Sekar (2018, short movie) as Donny. Lio also took part in HBO Asia's miniseries titled Grisse which aired on November 4, 2018.

Aside from acting, Lio also shows his interest in singing. He contributed to the movie soundtrack of Ada Apa Dengan Cinta? 2, produced by Melly Goeslaw and Anto Hoed. He made it through the audition to become Melly Goeslaw's duet partner on a track titled Ratusan Purnama by music label Aquarius Musikindo to promote the song in Malaysia. This song won as Best Soundtrack on Festival Film Indonesia (FFI) 2016 and Best Theme Song on 2016 Maya Awards.

Lio was nominated as best supporting actor on Festival Film Indonesia 2018 and Festival Film Bandung 2018 for his role in Sultan Agung : Tahta, Perjuangan, Cinta.

== Career ==
=== Film ===
- Sayang You Can Dance (2009)
- Merry Go Round (2013)
- Pertemuan
- Sleep Tight Maria
- Special Force
- 3 Plihan Hidup (2016)
- The Guys (2017)
- Eiffel... I'm in Love 2 (2018)
- Sultan Agung: Tahta, Perjuangan, Cinta]] (2018)
- Sekar (2018, short movie)
- Nawangish (2019)
- Mantan Manten (2019)
- Move On Aja (2019)
- Matt & Mou (2019)
- Sin (2019)
- Tersanjung (2020)
- Losmen Bu Broto (2021)
- Vengeance Is Mine, All Others Pay Cash (2021)
- Kadet 1947 (2021)
- The Big 4 (2022)
- The Elixir (2025)
- Dance of the Damned (2026)

=== TV Films and Shows ===
- Kawin Gantung 2
- Malin Kundang 2
- Pengen Jadi Bintang
- Cinderella Boy
- Bawang Putih Bawang Merah
- Benci Atau Cinta
- Man In Boy
- Misteri Angka 17
- Cinta Pertama Pacar ke Tiga
- Bukan Sms Biasa
- Tenggelamnya Kapal Pak Burik
- Grisse (2018)
- Layangan Putus (2021)

=== Music ===
- Featuring Album ke 6 ELEMENT
- Vokalist Band Pinocchio
- Featuring w/ Melly Goeslaw. Album OST. AADC2 (Ratusan Purnama)

== Awards ==
| Year | Awards | Category | Results |
|---|---|---|---|
| 2019 | Maya Awards | Best Supporting Actor | Won |

== Pageants ==
| Year | Achievement |
|---|---|
| 2004 | First place 1 photo model Model Indonesia |
| 2004 | Favorite Model Indonesia |
| 2004 | Second place Coverboy Aneka Yess! |
| 2005 | First place Putra Putri Bahari |
