= Makbul Mubarak =

Indonesian filmmaker (born 1990)

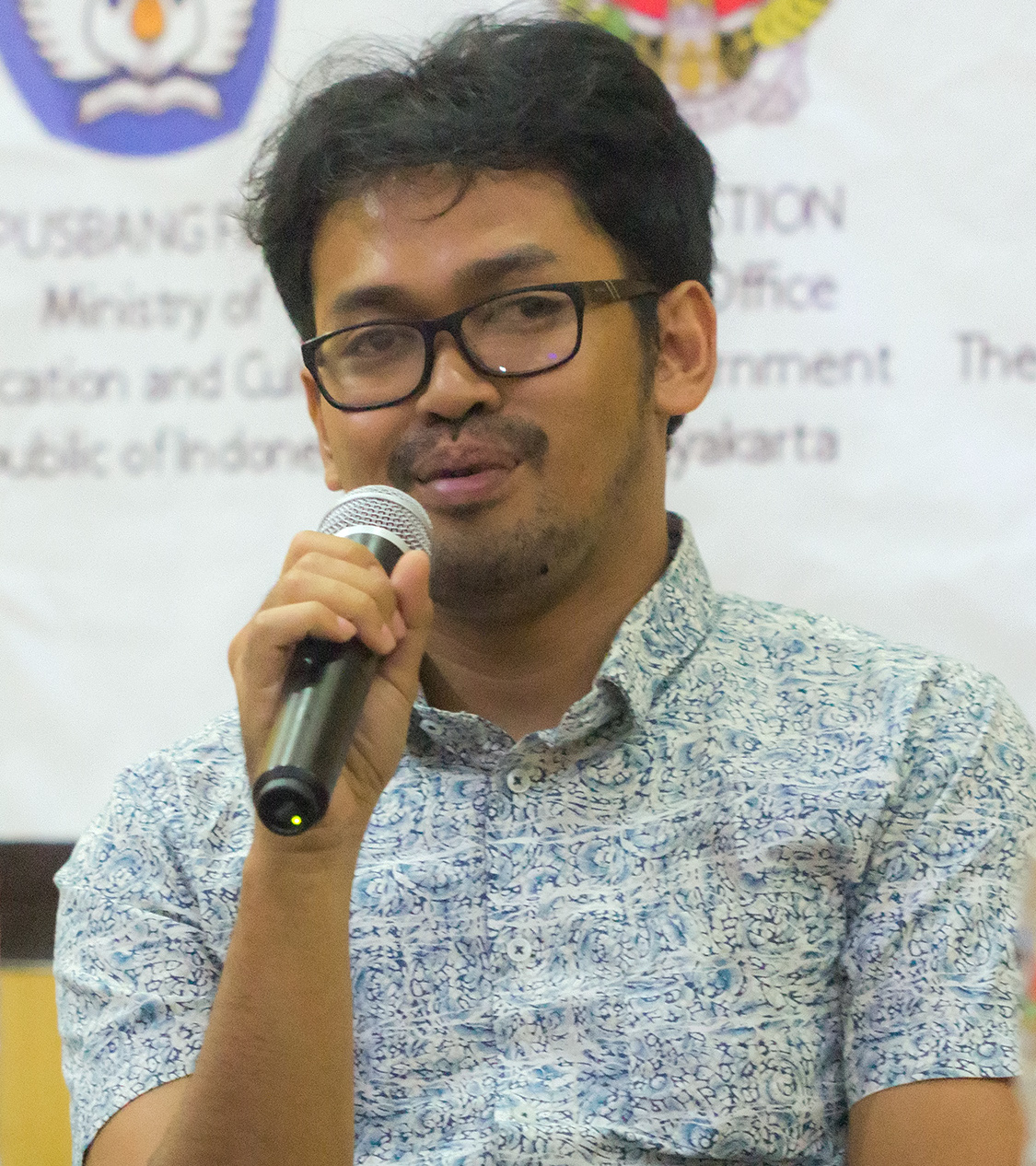
- Mubarak in 2018
- Born: 27 February 1990 (age 36); Tolitoli, Central Sulawesi, Indonesia
- Education: Muhammadiyah University of Yogyakarta; Korea National University of Arts
- Occupations: Filmmaker; screenwriter; film critic; lecturer
- Years active: 2009–present

Makbul Mubarak (born 27 February 1990) is an Indonesian filmmaker, screenwriter and a film critic He made his feature directorial debut, Autobiography (2022), which had its world premiere at the 79th Venice International Film Festival and won the FIPRESCI Award.

== Early life ==
Makbul Mubarak was born on 27 February 1990 in Tolitoli Regency, Central Sulawesi, Indonesia. In 2011, he graduated from the Muhammadiyah University of Yogyakarta, majoring in international relations. He earned a Master of Arts in Cinema Studies from the Korea National University of Arts in 2014.

== Career ==
Mubarak's career as a filmmaker started by directing a short film Sugih in 2015. It won the Best Fiction Action/Thriller/Fantasy Short Film at the 2016 XXI Short Film Festival. In 2017, he directed a short film The Malediction which received a Special Mention for Best Southeast Asian Short Film at the 28th Singapore International Film Festival. It won the Citra Award for Best Live Action Short Film at the 2017 Indonesian Film Festival. In 2022, he directed his feature directorial debut, political thriller film Autobiography. It had its world premiere at the 79th Venice International Film Festival, becoming the only Southeast Asian film to premiere at the Orizzonti section. For writing the film, he won the Best Screenplay at the 15th Asia Pacific Screen Awards. He also won the Citra Award for Best Original Screenplay at the 2022 Indonesian Film Festival. It was selected as the Indonesian entry for Best International Feature Film at the 96th Academy Awards. He is currently developing his second film Watch It Burn.

As a film critic, he contributed for various media outlets, including The Jakarta Post and Cinema Poetica. He participated in the Berlinale Talents in 2012.

== Filmography ==
=== Film ===
Year	Title	Director	Writer	Notes
2022	Autobiography	Yes	Yes	
TBA	Watch It Burn	Yes	Yes	

Short films

Year	Title	Director	Writer	Notes
2015	Sugih	Yes	No	
2016	Irasaimase	Yes	Yes	
2017	The Malediction	Yes	Yes	
2018	A Plastic Cup of Tea Before Her	Yes	Yes	

=== Television ===
Year	Title	Director	Writer	Network	Notes
2021–2025	Pakai Hati	Yes	Yes	YouTube	2 seasons
2022	Modus Operandi	Yes	Yes	YouTube	
