= Teguh Slamet Rahardjo =

Indonesian comedian

Teguh
- Born: Kho Tjien Tiong; August 8, 1926; Klaten, Central Java, Dutch East Indies
- Died: September 22, 1996 (aged 70); Surakarta, Central Java, Indonesia
- Other names: Teguh Slamet Rahardjo
- Occupations: Comedian; actor
- Known for: founder and leader of Srimulat
- Spouses: R.A. Srimulat (m. 1950; died 1968) Djudjuk Djuariah (m. 1970–1996)
- Children: 4

Teguh Slamet Rajardjo (1926–1996), popularly known as Teguh Srimulat, was an Indonesian comedian and actor. With his first wife Raden Ajeng Srimulat, he founded the Srimulat comedy troupe which became popular in the postwar era for its absurdist Slapstick comedy and social satire.

== Early life ==
Teguh was born Kho Tjien Tiong in a Chinese Indonesian family in Klaten, Central Java, Dutch East Indies in 1926. He was adopted by the Go family, who ran a printing company. His primary education was in a Tiong Hoa Hwee Koan school in Surakarta.

== Career ==
While working at his family's printing company in the early 1940s, Teguh was exposed to music and started to learn the violin and guitar from a Javanese neighbor, and formed a Keroncong group (a type of popular music in the Indies influenced by Hawaiian and Portuguese music). The group was named Orkes Krontjong Asli. He soon left his amateur orchestra to play in more popular groups like the Orkes Keroncong Bunga Mawar. It was in 1946 while he was working as a guitarist that he met his future first wife, Raden Ajeng Srimulat, who was already a popular Keroncong singer. They began to perform together regularly, to the point that he adopted her name as his stage name: Teguh Srimulat. They were married in 1950, and in that same year they established their touring troupe, called variously Kerontjong Avond, Srimulat Review and Gema-Malem Srimulat; they performed most often in Surabaya. They also regularly performed in night markets around Java.

In the early 1960s, the touring troupe was re-launched as Aneka Ria Srimulat, with a home stage in Jakarta and regular appearances in Surabaya, Surakarta, and Semarang. Teguh pushed the group towards a more innovative kind of improvisational comedy as well as slapstick comedy and traditional Javanese forms. As the troupe became much larger a number of its actors became well-known comedians in their own right, including Johni Gudel, Edy Geyol, Herry Koko, Gepeng, and Dandempo, and they began to make regular television appearances. When his wife R. A. Srimulat died in 1968, the troupe continued without her, eventually shortening the group's name simply to Srimulat. In 1970 Teguh remarried to another fellow comedian, Djudjuk.

They also began to create comedic films in the 1970s, some of which Teguh co-wrote: Mayat Cemburu (1973) and Walang Kekek (1974). Many of their skits and appearances involved parodies of American and other foreign films, mixing low-class Javanese language humour with satires of serious content. Other skits parodied Bourgeois propriety and featured clever servants getting the best of their masters. The peak of the group's popularity was from the 1960s to the 1980s, but they continued to produce famous comedians who became a part of Indonesian popular culture into the twenty-first century.

Teguh died of a heart attack in Surakarta in 1996.
