= Panasonic Awards 2009 =

Annual Panasonic Awards
- Date: March 26, 2009
- Location: XXI Djakarta Theater, Menteng, Central Jakarta
- Country: Indonesia
- Presented by: Raffi Ahmad; Olga Syahputra
- Website: http://www.panasonic-gobelawards.com/

Television/radio coverage
- Network: MNC Group; RCTI, MNCTV, Global TV
- Runtime: 180 minutes

The 12th Annual Panasonic Awards honoring the favorite in Indonesian television programming/production works/individual, were held on Friday, March 27, 2009 at the XXI Jakarta Theater in Jalan M.H. Thamrin, Menteng, Central Jakarta. Comedian Olga Syahputra and actor Raffi Ahmad hosted for this awards ceremonies. Chairman of the committee on this edition was Rinaldi Sjarif. The night of 12th ceremonies awards was held by Indonesian vice-president Jusuf Kalla and broadcast live on RCTI, MNCTV and Global TV.

== Scoring system ==
Selection of award categories is based on research conducted by AGB Nielsen Media Research. Each nomination is verified by the verification team composed of practitioners and people who are experts in the field of television and entertainment. Initial screening program of 12th annual ceremonies were did by AGB Media Research. Methods poll conducted by telephone on 1300 respondents were spread across ten cities in Indonesia.

The verification team of 12th annual ceremonies consists of individual who expert on television program, are Wishnutama (Trans TV), Yeni P. Ashar and Rosiana Silalahi (SCTV, Nana Putra (TPI), Manoj Punjabi (MD Entertainment), Irfan Ramli (Association of Indonesian advertising), Idi Subandy Ibrahim (Cultural Analyst and Student of the Post-Graduate Program of Communication, University of Indonesia) and Anjasmara (an Actor).

== Winners and nominees ==
The nominees were announced on February 17, 2009. Winners are listed first and highlighted on boldface.

Favorite Drama Series Program	Favorite Quiz/Game Show Program
**Cinta Fitri Season 3 (SCTV)**; Cinta Bunga (SCTV); Azizah (SCTV); Soleha (RCTI); Cahaya (RCTI)	**Gong Show (Trans TV)**; Maju Terus Pantang Mundur (Trans TV); Deal or No Deal Indonesia (RCTI); Hole in the Wall (RCTI); Sing A Song (RCTI)
Favorite Infotainment Program	Favorite Music/Variety Show Program
**Silet (RCTI)**; Hot Shot (SCTV); Halo Selebriti (SCTV); Sketsa Selebriti (SCTV); Ada Gosip (SCTV)	**Mamamoia Show (Indosiar)**; Supermama Selebshow (Indosiar); Stardut (Indosiar); Superstar Show (Indosiar); Dangdut Mania Dadakan 2 (Indosiar)
Favorite Reality Show Program	Favorite News Magazine Program
**Termehek-Mehek (Trans TV)**; Rapor Idola Cilik (RCTI); Jika Aku Menjadi... (Trans TV); Happy Family Me VS Mom (Trans TV); Jail! (Trans TV)	**KPK (Kumpulan Perkara Korupsi) (Trans TV)**; Jelang Siang (Trans TV); Sigi 30 Menit (SCTV); Griya Unik (Trans TV); Atas Nama Cinta (Trans TV)
Favorite Entertainment Talkshow Program	Favorite News Talkshow Program
**Bukan Empat Mata (Trans 7)**; Empat Mata (Trans 7); Dorce Show (Trans TV); Ceriwis (Trans TV); Negeri Impian (TvOne)	**Kick Andy (Metro TV)**; Debat (TvOne); Topik Minggu Ini (ANTV); Apa Kabar Indonesia Malam (TvOne); Cover Story (TvOne)
Favorite Comedy Program	Favorite Sport Program
**Extravaganza (Trans TV)**; Akhirnya Datang Juga (Trans TV); Prime Time! (Trans TV); Saatnya Kita Sahur (Trans TV); The Coffee Bean Show (Trans TV)	**Liga Jarum (ANTV)**; AFC Asian Cup (RCTI); AFC Asian (Global TV); Liga Djarum (TvOne); Copa Indonesia (TvOne)
Favorite Children Program	Favorite Children Edutainment Program
**Pentas Idola Cilik (RCTI)**; Idola Seleb (RCTI); Menuju Pentas (RCTI); Cabe Rawit (TPI); Soccer Boys	**Si Bolang Bocah Petualang (Trans 7)**; Laptop Si Unyil (Trans 7); After School (RCTI); Main Yuk! (Trans 7); Surat Sahabat (Trans TV)
Favorite Documentary Program	Favorite News Program
**Potret (SCTV)**; Urban (RCTI); Metro Files (Metro TV); Jendela (TPI); Telusur (TvOne); Mata Rantai (ANTV); Reportase Investigasi (Trans TV); Kisah Anak Nusantara (Trans 7)	**Seputar Indonesia (RCTI)**; Berita Global (Global TV); Headline News (Metro TV); Sidik Kasus (TPI); Kabar Petang (TvOne); Liputan 6 Petang (SCTV); Topik Petang (ANTV); Cerita Anak (Trans TV); Redaksi Kontroversi (Trans 7)

=== Individual ===
Favorite Actor	Favorite Actress
**Teuku Wisnu – Cinta Fitri Season 3**; Adly Fairuz – Cinta Fitri Season 3; Dude Herlino – Cahaya; Rezky Aditya – Melati Untuk Marvel; Christian Sugiono – Alisa	**Shireen Sungkar – Cinta Fitri Season 3**; Chelsea Olivia – Melati Untuk Marvel; Luna Maya; Naysila Mirdad – Cahaya; Alyssa Soebandono – Alisa
Favorite Quiz/Game Show Presenter	Favorite Infotainment Presenter
**Tantowi Yahya – Deal or No Deal Indonesia**; Helmi Yahya – Betul atau Salah?; Irgy Ahmad Fahrezy – Missing Lyrics; Farhan; Eko Patrio	**Cut Tari – Insert**; Irfan Hakim; Feni Rose – Silet; Ruben Onsu; Tessa Kaunang
Favorite Music/Variety Show Presenter	Favorite News/Current Affairs Presenter
**Olga Syahputra – Dahsyat**; Luna Maya – Dahsyat; Raffi Ahmad – Dahsyat; Andhara Early; Ruben Onsu	**Putra Nababan – Seputar Indonesia**; Rosiana Silalahi; Bayu Sutiyono; Chantal Della Concetta; Arif Suditomo
Favorite Reality Show Presenter	Favorite Talkshow Presenter
**Uya Kuya**; Cici Panda; Mandala Shoji – Termehek-Mehek; Ratna Listy; Ruben Onsu – Happy Family Me Vs Mom	**Tukul Arwana – Bukan Empat Mata**; Dorce Gamalama – Dorce Show; Andy F. Noya – Kick Andy; Indy Barends – Ceriwis; Indra Bekti
Favorite Sport Presenter	Favorite Comedian
**Darius Sinathrya**; Donna Agnesia; Terry Putri; Dik Doank; Deasy Novianti	**Olga Syahputra – Saatnya Kita Sahur**; Tukul Arwana; Eko Patrio; Komeng - Saatnya Kita Sahur; Aming – Extravaganza
