= List of awards and nominations received by Olga Syahputra =

Olga Syahputra awards and nominations
Awards and nominations
Award	Wins	Nominations
Bintang RPTI Awards	2	3
Dahsyatnya Awards	1	2
Global Seru Awards	0	1
Insert Awards	1	2
Nickelodeon Indonesia Kids' Choice Awards	2	7
Panasonic Awards	8	19
Yahoo! OMG Awards	1	2
YKS Romantic Awards	2	2

Totals (Note: Certain award groups do not simply award one winner. They acknowledge several different recipients, have runners-up, and have third place. Since this is a specific recognition and is different from losing an award, runner-up mentions are considered wins in this award tally. For simplification and to avoid errors, each award in this list has been presumed to have had a prior nomination.)
- Wins: 20
- Nominations: 45

Olga Syahputra (8 February 1983 – 27 March 2015) was an Indonesian actor, comedian, singer, and television presenter. He often portrayed transvestites to comedic effect.

In 2008, Olga became a TV presenter of music events on Dahsyat, a morning shown on RCTI. His co-presenter since March 2011 was Jessica Iskandar. Olga won the award for Favorite Music/Variety Show Presenter and Favorite Comedian in 2009 Panasonic Awards and 2010 Panasonic Awards published in RCTI, MNCTV, and Global TV. He also starred in movies such as Skandal Cinta Babi Ngepet and Mau Lagi (released as Cintaku Selamanya).

This is a list awards received by Olga Syahputra.

== Bintang RPTI Awards ==
Year	Nominee / work	Award	Result
2011	Olga Syahputra	Favorite Presenter	Won
2012	Olga Syahputra	Celebrity Top Rating of the Year	Nominated
2014	Olga Syahputra	Favorite Comedian	Won

== Dahsyatnya Awards ==
The Dahsyatnya Awards are annual awards presented by the daily Indonesian TV show Dahsyat that airs on RCTI. Olga has received one award from 2 nominations.

Year	Nominee / work	Award	Result
2014	Olga Syahputra Sick	Outstanding Moment	Nominated
2016	Olga Syahputra	Outstanding Host	Won

== Fokus Selebriti Awards ==
Year	Nominee / work	Award	Result
2013	Olga Syahputra	Focused Male Celebrity	Nominated
2015	Olga Syahputra	Hottest News	Nominated

== Global Seru Awards ==
The Global Seru Awards are awarded to celebrities who have caught the attention of the public through interesting or exciting accomplishments.

Year	Nominee / work	Award	Result
2014	Olga Syahputra	Most Exciting Comedian	Nominated

== Insert Awards ==
Year	Nominee / work	Award	Result
2011	Olga Syahputra	The Funniest Celebrity	Nominated
2014	Olga Syahputra	Lifetime Achievement Awards	Won

== Nickelodeon Indonesia Kids' Choice Awards ==
The Nickelodeon Indonesia Kids' Choice Awards is Indonesian version of Nickelodeon Kids' Choice Awards, held since 2008 in Jakarta. Olga has received two awards from 7 nominations.

Year	Nominee / work	Award	Result
2009	Olga Syahputra	Favorite Presenter	Won
2010	Olga Syahputra	Favorite Presenter	Nominated
2011	Olga Syahputra	Favorite Presenter	Won
2011	Olga Syahputra	Favorite Comedian	Nominated
2012	Olga Syahputra	Favorite Comedian	Nominated
2013	Olga Syahputra	Favorite Comedian	Nominated
2014	Olga Syahputra	Favorite Comedian	Nominated

== Obsesi Awards ==
Year	Nominee / work	Award	Result
2015	Olga Syahputra	Most Obsession Male	Won

== OVJ Awards ==
The OVJ Awards are awards for the cast of the television show Opera Van Java, both regular and guest stars. Olga has received one award from two nominations.

Year	Nominee / work	Award	Result
2011	Olga Syahputra vs. Vincent	Best Battle	Won
2013	Olga Syahputra	Most Shocked Artist	Nominated

== Panasonic Awards ==
The Panasonic Awards is an award presented to television programs and individuals, based on poll results. The poll was originally conducted by the Indonesian tabloid Citra, but was taken over by Nielsen Media Research in 2004. Olga received eight awards from 19 nominations.

Year	Nominee / work	Award	Result
2009	Dahsyat	Favorite Music/Variety Show Presenter	Won
2009	Dahsyat	Favorite Comedian	Won
2010	Dahsyat	Favorite Music/Variety Show Presenter	Won
2010	Dahsyat	Favorite Comedian	Won
2010	Online	Favorite Talkshow Presenter	Nominated
2011	Dahsyat	Favorite Music/Variety Show Presenter	Won
2011	Dahsyat	Favorite Comedian	Nominated
2011	Dahsyat	Favorite Talkshow Presenter	Nominated
2012	Dahsyat	Favorite Music/Variety Show Presenter	Nominated
2012	Dahsyat	Favorite Entertainment Talkshow Presenter	Nominated
2012	Pesbukers	Favorite Comedian	Nominated
2012	Tarung Dangdut	Favorite Talent Show Presenter	Won
2012	Catatan Si Olga	Favorite Reality Show Presenter	Nominated
2013	Pesbukers	Favorite Comedian	Won
2013	Catatan Si Olga	Favorite Reality Show Presenter	Nominated
2013	Dahsyat	Favorite Music/Variety Show Presenter	Nominated
2014	Pesbukers	Favorite Comedian	Nominated
2014	Dahsyat	Favorite Entertainment Program Presenter	Nominated
2015	Pesbukers	Favorite Comedian	Won

== Silet Awards ==
The Silet Awards is an annual awards show held by the infotainment show Silet for artists and shows broadcast on RCTI. Olga received one award from two nominations.

Year	Nominee / work	Award	Result
2014	Olga Syahputra	Razored Life Story	Nominated
2015	Olga Syahputra	Special Award	Won

== Yahoo! OMG Awards ==
Year	Nominee / work	Award	Result
2012	Olga Syahputra Insult Islam	Hottest Scandal	Won
2013	Olga Syahputra	Most Talked About	Nominated

== YKS Romantic Awards ==
The YKS Romantic Awards is an awards show presented by Yuk Keep Smile, a TV show which is broadcast on Trans TV. The awards show is held on February 14 every year to coincide with Valentine's Day. Olga received two awards.

Year	Nominee / work	Award	Result
2014	Olga Syahputra	Most Surprised Artist	Won
2014	Olga Syahputra	Most Lulled Artist	Won
