= 2010 Panasonic Gobel Awards =

Annual Panasonic Gobel Awards
- Location: XXI Djakarta Theater, Menteng, Central Jakarta
- Country: Indonesia
- Presented by: Tina Talisa; Raffi Ahmad; Cathy Sharon; Choky Sitohang
- Website: http://www.panasonic-gobelawards.com/

Television/radio coverage
- Network: MNC Group; RCTI, MNCTV, Global TV
- Runtime: 180 minutes

The 13th Annual Panasonic Gobel Awards (or the 13th Annual Panasonic Awards) honoring the favorite in television programming/production works/individual, was held on March 26, 2010, at the Ballroom Theater Djakarta XXI in Jalan M.H. Thamrin, Menteng, Central Jakarta. RCTI, Global TV and RCTI televised the ceremony in the Indonesia. This 2010 ceremony awards this issue titled "Indonesia Unite". The event coincides with the Golden Year of PT Panasonic Gobel Indonesia, as the organizer of Panasonic Awards.

With the momentum of the Golden Year of the PT Panasonic Gobel Indonesia provide additional award from Panasonic Awards names that have been used since 1997, the Panasonic Awards and was followed by changes to the logo of the award. The goal is to provide a clear identity that the show is an original idea from Indonesia. This idea was inspired by the spirit of Drs. H. Thayeb Mohammad Gobel, founder of Panasonic Gobel Indonesia and the presence of TV industry pioneer in Indonesia.

The 2010 ceremonies awards was hosted by four Indonesian best presenter. They are Tina Talisa (News tvOne), Raffi Ahmad (Dahsyat RCTI), Cathy Sharon (Inbox SCTV), and Choky Sitohang (Take Me Out Indonesia Indosiar).

== Judges (Verification Team) ==
Verification team of the 13th annual ceremonies consists of individual who expert on television and entertainment. They are:

- Rosiana Silalahi (Delegation of desk News)
- Manoj Punjabi (expertise of Soap-opera program dan Production House)
- Helmy Yahya (Delegation of Television industry performer)
- Indra Yudhistira (RCTI)
- Eko Patrio (artist)
- Robby Winarka (Industry performer)
- Maman Suherman (Industry performer)
- Sofyan Herbowo (public delegation)
- Karni Ilyas (TVOne)
- Quilla Jozal (Trans Corp), and
- Deddy Mizwar (artist delegation).

== Performers ==
| Artist(s) | Song(s) |
Main show
| The Changcuters | "Suka-Suka" |
| Indonesian boy band excel | "Tanah Airku" "Tokecang" "Jaranan" "Si Patokaan" "Ayam Den Lapeh" |
| Vierra; Addie MS; Afgan; Koes Hendratmo | "Perih" |
| Once Mekel | "Symphoni Yang Indah" |
| Nidji | "Ku Takkan Bisa" |
| D'Masiv | "Jangan Menyerah" |
| Nidji | "Sang Mantan" |
| Afgan; Cinta Laura; Bunga Citra Lestari | "Si Doel Anak Sekolahan" "Oh Baby" "Karena Ku Cinta Kau" |

== Presenters ==
- Ridho Rhoma and Thalita Latief – Presented Favorite Music/Variety Show Program
- Ade Namnung and Amel Carla – Presented Favorite Children Program
- Richard Kevin and Carissa Putri – Presented Favorite Talkshow Presenter
- Arie Untung, Adul and Yuanita Christiani – Presented Favorite Talent Search Program
- Andre Taulany, Parto Patrio, Aziz Gagap and Sule – Presented Favorite Comedian
- Limbad and Deddy Corbuzier – Presented Favorite Sport Program
- Rinaldi Sjarif – Presented Lifetime Achievement Award
- Shireen Sungkar, Nikita Willy, Laudya Cynthia Bella, Naysilla Mirdad and Dinda Kanya Dewi – Presented Favorite Actor
- Chicco Jerikho, Olga Syahputra, Dude Herlino, Rionaldo Stockhorst and Teuku Wisnu – Presented Favorite Actress
- Mathias Muchus and Anwar Fuady – Presented Favorite Drama Series

== Winners and nominees ==
The nominees were announced on February 18, 2010. Winners are listed first and highlighted on boldface.

=== Program ===
| Favorite Drama Series Program | Favorite Quiz/Game Show Program |
|---|---|
| **Cinta Fitri Season 5 (SCTV)**; Cinta dan Anugerah (RCTI); Safa dan Marwah (RCTI); Nikita (RCTI); Inayah (Indosiar) | **Gong Show (Trans TV)**; Bombastis (RCTI); Happy Song (Indosiar); Maju Terus Pantang Mundur (Trans TV); Penting Banget (Trans TV) |
| Favorite Infotainment Program | Favorite Music/Variety Show Program |
| **Silet (RCTI)**; Ada Gosip (SCTV); Halo Selebriti (SCTV); Hot Shot (SCTV); Kabar-Kabari (RCTI) | **Dahsyat (RCTI)**; BRI di Hati (Trans TV); Hip-Hip Hura (SCTV); Inbox (SCTV); Kemilau Mandiri Fiesta (RCTI) |
| Favorite Reality Show Program | Favorite Comedy Program |
| **Take Me Out Indonesia (Indosiar)**; Happy Family Me Vs Mom (Trans TV); Jika Aku Menjadi... (Trans TV); Realigi (Trans TV); Termehek-Mehek (Trans TV) | **Opera Van Java (Trans 7)**; Akhirnya Datang Juga (Trans TV); Extravaganza (Trans TV); Prime Time! (Trans TV); Saatnya Kita Sahur (Trans TV) |
| Favorite News Talkshow Program | Favorite Entertainment Talkshow Program |
| **Debat (TvOne)**; Apa Kabar Indonesia Malam (TvOne); Barometer (SCTV); Indonesian Lawyers Club (TvOne); Kabar Sepekan (TvOne) | **Bukan Empat Mata (Trans 7)**; Ceriwis (Trans TV); D'Show (Trans TV); Dorce Show (Trans TV); Online (Trans TV) |
| Favorite Sport Program | Favorite Children Program |
| **Djarum ISL (ANTV)**; Copa Indonesia (TvOne); Galeri Sepak Bola Indonesia (Trans 7); Highlight Moto GP (Trans 7); One Stop Football (Trans 7) | **Idola Cilik (RCTI)**; Cinta Juga Kuya (SCTV); Dunia Air (Trans 7); Laptop Si Unyil (Trans 7); Si Bolang Bocah Petualang (Trans 7) |
| Favorite Features Program | Favorite Talent Search Program |
| **Griya Unik (Trans TV)**; Etalase (Trans 7); Jelang Siang (Trans TV); KPK (Trans TV); Sidik Kasus (TPI) | **The Master (RCTI)**; Dangdut Mania (TPI); KDI (TPI); Supermama Celebconcert (Indosiar); 3D Show (Indosiar) |
Favorite News/Current Affairs Program
**Seputar Indonesia (RCTI)**; Global Siang (Global TV); Kabar Petang (TvOne); Lintas 5 (TPI); Liputan 6 Petang (SCTV); Metro Hari Ini (Metro TV); Redaksi Kontroversi (Trans 7); Reportase Investigasi (Trans TV); Topik Petang (ANTV)

=== Individual ===
| Favorite Actor | Favorite Actress |
|---|---|
| **Dude Herlino – Nikita**; Adly Fairuz – Cinta Fitri Season 5; Baim Wong; Chicco Jerikho – Bayu Cinta Luna; Teuku Wisnu – Cinta Fitri Season 5 | **Nikita Willy – Nikita**; Bunga Citra Lestari – Bayu Cinta Luna; Luna Maya; Naysilla Mirdad – Doa dan Karunia; Shireen Sungkar – Cinta Fitri Season 5 |
| Favorite Quiz/Game Show Presenter | Favorite Infotainment Presenter |
| **Choky Sitohang – Happy Song**; Arie Untung – Gong Show; Darius Sinathrya – Super Family; Helmy Yahya – Siapa Lebih Berani?; Tantowi Yahya | **Feni Rose – Silet**; Cut Tari – Insert; Indra Herlambang – Insert; Irfan Hakim – Insert; Ruben Onsu – Kiss |
| Favorite Music/Variety Show Presenter | Favorite News/Current Affairs Presenter |
| **Olga Syahputra – Dahsyat**; Choky Sitohang; Ivan Gunawan; Luna Maya – Dahsyat; Raffi Ahmad – Dahsyat | **Putra Nababan – Seputar Indonesia**; Chantal Della Concetta – Seputar Indonesia; Jeremy Teti; Najwa Shihab; Tina Talisa |
| Favorite Talkshow Presenter | Favorite Talent Show Presenter |
| **Andy F. Noya – Kick Andy**; Desy Ratnasari; Dorce Gamalama; Olga Syahputra; Tukul Arwana – Bukan Empat Mata | **Okky Lukman – Idola Cilik**; Adi Nugroho; Eko Patrio; Ivan Gunawan; Ruben Onsu |
| Favorite Reality Show Presenter | Favorite Sport Presenter |
| **Uya Kuya – Uya Emang Kuya**; Cici Panda; Helmy Yahya; Mandala Shoji – Termasuk-Mehek; Ratna Listy | **Darius Sinathrya – Liga Inggris**; Boy Noya; Donna Agnesia; Ricky Jo; Terry Putri |
Favorite Comedian
**Olga Syahputra – Dahsyat**; Aziz Gagap – Opera Van Java; Eko Patrio; Komeng; Sule – Opera Van Java

Lifetime Achievement Award
**Dr. Ishadi Soetopo Kartosapoetro**

== See also ==
- Panasonic Awards
- 2011 Panasonic Gobel Awards
