= Cecepy Bikin Happy =

- Genre: Talk show
- Starring: Ayu Ting Ting; Julia Perez; Zaskia Gotik; Mumuk Gomez; Tarra Budiman
- Country of origin: Indonesia
- Original language: Indonesian

Production
- Running time: 60 minutes

Original release
- Network: RCTI
- Release: February 29 – June 28, 2016

Cecepy Bikin Happy (Cecepy Makes You Happy) was an Indonesian reality show, hosted by Ayu Ting Ting, Julia Perez, Zaskia Gotik, Mumuk Gomez and Tarra Budiman. The hour-long show made its debut on February 29, 2016, and ended a few months later on June 28, 2016.

The variety show had been nominated for Favorite Music/Variety Show Program at the 2016 Panasonic Gobel Awards; however, it lost to Dahsyat.

== Controversy ==
Host Zaskia Gotik stopped appearing in the show due to case of alleged harassment of the Indonesian state symbol. Gotik said she would come back to the show after the case had ended. Gotik denied that she had been fired from the show as a result.

== Cast ==
- Ayu Ting Ting
- Julia Perez
- Zaskia Gotik
- Mumuk Gomez
- Tarra Budiman

== Awards and nominations ==
Year	Awards	Category	Result
2016	Panasonic Gobel Awards	Favorite Music/Variety Show Program	Nominated
