= List of awards and nominations received by Luna Maya =

Luna Maya awards and nominations
Awards and nominations
| Award | Wins | Nominations |
| Anugerah Musik Indonesia | 0 | 2 |
| Gadis Awards | 1 | 1 |
| Grazia Glitz & Glam Awards | 3 | 3 |
| Insert Awards | 2 | 2 |
| Jawa Pos Awards | 5 | 5 |
| Nickelodeon Indonesia Kids' Choice Awards | 1 | 4 |
| Panasonic Awards | 0 | 4 |
| Rolling Stone Editor's Choice Awards | 1 | 1 |
| Yahoo! OMG Awards | 1 | 1 |
| Indonesian Movie Actors Awards | 1 | 2 |

Totals (Note: Certain award groups do not simply award one winner. They acknowledge several different recipients, have runners-up, and have third place. Since this is a specific recognition and is different from losing an award, runner-up mentions are considered wins in this award tally. For simplification and to avoid errors, each award in this list has been presumed to have had a prior nomination.)
- Wins: 32
- Nominations: 60

Luna Maya is an Indonesian model, actress, and presenter of Austrian descent. She started her career as an advertising and catwalk model.

In 2006, Luna was nominated for "Best Female Leading Role" at the 2006 Indonesian Film Festival for her work in Ruang. She was nominated as "Most Favorite Actress" at the 2007 MTV Indonesia Movie Awards for the film Pesan Dari Surga.

In 2008, Luna was named as brand ambassador for Toshiba products in Indonesia. She is the first Indonesian to be named an ambassador of the World Food Programme. Also in 2008, she was appointed ambassador of World Wide Fund for Nature after her work at a tree-planting event in Demak, Central Java.

Luna was among the people chosen to carry the Olympic torch for the 2008 Summer Olympics. She was chosen through online voting conducted in 2007.

This is a list awards received by Luna Maya.

== Anugerah Musik Indonesia ==
The Anugerah Musik Indonesia (English translation: Indonesian Music Awards), is an annual Indonesian major music awards. They have been compared to the American Grammy Awards and British Brit Awards. The award was formalized in 1997 by ASIRI (Association of Indonesia Recording Industry), PAPPRI (Association of Indonesian Singers, Songwriters and Music Record Producers), and KCI (Copyright Office of Indonesia). It is the highest music awards given to outstanding artists in Indonesia.

| Year | Nominee / work | Award | Result |
|---|---|---|---|
| 2010 | "Suara (Ku Berharap)" | Best Collaboration Song Production Work | Nominated |
| 2010 | "Suara (Ku Berharap)" | Best Original Soundtrack Production Work | Nominated |

== Bintang RPTI Awards ==
| Year | Nominee / work | Award | Result |
|---|---|---|---|
| 2012 | Dewi Bintari | Favorite Actress | Nominated |

== Dahsyatnya Awards ==
The Dahsyatnya Awards are annual awards presented by the daily Indonesian TV show Dahsyat that airs on RCTI.

| Year | Nominee / work | Award | Result |
|---|---|---|---|
| 2013 | "Sudah Biasa" | Outstanding Video Clip | Nominated |
| 2013 | "Sudah Biasa" | Outstanding Video Clip Director | Nominated |
| 2015 | Luna Maya's Birthday | Outstanding Birthday | Nominated |

== EO Avante & E-Motion Entertainment Inspiring Women Awards ==
| Year | Nominee / work | Award | Result |
|---|---|---|---|
| 2005 | Luna Maya | Best Face | Won |

== Festival Film Bandung ==
The Festival Film Bandung (English translation: Bandung Film Festival), is an awards ceremony held by the Bandung Film Forum community. It has been held regularly since 1987.

| Year | Nominee / work | Award | Result |
|---|---|---|---|
| 2007 | Jakarta Undercover | Best Actress | Nominated |
| 2019 | Suzzanna, Bernapas dalam Kubur | Best Actress | Won |
| 2021 | Sabar Ini Ujian | Best Supporting Actress | Nominated |

== Festival Film Indonesia ==
The Festival Film Indonesia (English translation: Indonesian Film Festival), is an annual awards ceremony organized by the Indonesian Film Board honoring achievements in the Indonesian film industry.

| Year | Nominee / work | Award | Result |
|---|---|---|---|
| 2006 | Ruang | Best Actress | Nominated |
| 2007 | Jakarta Undercover | Best Actress | Nominated |

== Gadis Awards ==
| Year | Nominee / work | Award | Result |
|---|---|---|---|
| 2009 | Luna Maya | Most Favorite Artist | Won |

== Global Seru Awards ==
The Global Seru Awards are awarded to celebrities who have caught the attention of the public through interesting or exciting accomplishments.

| Year | Nominee / work | Award | Result |
|---|---|---|---|
| 2015 | Luna Maya | Most Exciting Social Media Artist | Nominated |

== Grazia Glitz & Glam Awards ==
| Year | Nominee / work | Award | Result |
|---|---|---|---|
| 2011 | Luna Maya | The Best Comeback | Won |
| 2011 | Luna Maya | Most Favorite Cover | Won |
| 2012 | Luna Maya | Most Favorite Cover | Won |

== Indonesian Movie Awards ==
The Indonesian Movie Awards are awards for Indonesian films and actors.

| Year | Nominee / work | Award | Result |
|---|---|---|---|
| 2007 | Ruang | Best Actress | Nominated |
| 2007 | Ruang | Favorite Actress | Nominated |
| 2019 | Suzzanna, Bernapas dalam Kubur | Best Actress | Nominated |
| 2019 | Suzzanna, Bernapas dalam Kubur | Favorite Actress | Won |

== Insert Awards ==
| Year | Nominee / work | Award | Result |
|---|---|---|---|
| 2008 | Luna Maya | Most Sexiest Female Celebrity | Won |
| 2009 | Luna Maya | We Love to Hate Artist | Won |

== Jawa Pos Awards ==
| Year | Nominee / work | Award | Result |
|---|---|---|---|
| 2007 | Luna Maya | Favorite Female Star Advertisement | Won |
| 2008 | Luna Maya | Favorite Film Actress | Won |
| 2008 | Luna Maya | Favorite Female Star Advertisement | Won |
| 2009 | Luna Maya | Favorite Film Actress | Won |
| 2009 | Luna Maya | Favorite Female Star Advertisement | Won |

== LA Lights Indie Movie Awards ==
| Year | Nominee / work | Award | Result |
|---|---|---|---|
| 2009 | Suci and the City | Special Mention Award | Won |

== Maya Awards ==
The Maya Awards (Indonesian translation: Piala Maya), is an annual Indonesian film award initiated in 2012 by Indonesian online film enthusiasts, that is initiated by @FILM_Indonesia Twitter (today is X) account. Nominations and awards are given to each year's best local productions.

| Year | Nominee / work | Award | Result |
|---|---|---|---|
| 2012 | Hi5teria | Best Actress in an Omnibus | Nominated |
| 2014 | Princess, Bajak Laut & Alien | Best Actress in an Omnibus | Nominated |
| 2019 | Suzzanna, Bernapas dalam Kubur | Best Actress | Won |
| 2021 | Sabar Ini Ujian | Best Scene Stealer | Nominated |

== MTV Indonesia Movie Awards ==
The MTV Indonesia Movie Awards is an Indonesian awards show established in 1995. The show is based on the US MTV Movie Awards.

| Year | Nominee / work | Award | Result |
|---|---|---|---|
| 2005 | Bangsal 13 | Most Favourite Actress | Nominated |
| 2006 | Ruang | Most Favourite Actress | Nominated |
| 2007 | Pesan Dari Surga | Most Favourite Actress | Nominated |

== Nickelodeon Indonesia Kids' Choice Awards ==
The Nickelodeon Indonesia Kids' Choice Awards is the Indonesian version of Nickelodeon Kids' Choice Awards, held since 2008 in Jakarta. Luna received one award from 4 nominations.

| Year | Nominee / work | Award | Result |
|---|---|---|---|
| 2008 | Luna Maya | Favorite Actress | Nominated |
| 2009 | Luna Maya | Favorite Actress | Won |
| 2009 | Luna Maya | Favorite Presenter | Nominated |
| 2010 | Luna Maya | Favorite Actress | Nominated |

== Panasonic Awards ==
The Panasonic Awards is an award given to the most favorite television programs and performances based on poll result since 1997. The poll was originally conducted by Indonesia's tabloid, Citra, but was taken over by Nielsen Media Research.

| Year | Nominee / work | Award | Result |
|---|---|---|---|
| 2009 | Sujudku | Favourite Actress | Nominated |
| 2009 | Dahsyat | Favourite Music/Variety Show Presenter | Nominated |
| 2010 | Dewi | Favourite Actress | Nominated |
| 2010 | Dahsyat | Favourite Music/Variety Show Presenter | Nominated |

== Rolling Stones Editor's Choice Awards ==
| Year | Nominee / work | Award | Result |
|---|---|---|---|
| 2009 | Luna Maya | The Sensational Artist of the Year | Won |

== Socmed Awards ==
The Socmed Awards are an awards to celebrities and public figures who dominated the popularity of various social media, such as Blogs, YouTube, Twitter (today is X), and Instagram.

| Year | Nominee / work | Award | Result |
|---|---|---|---|
| 2016 | Luna Maya | Celeb Twit Female | Nominated |
| 2016 | Luna Maya | Celeb Gram Female | Nominated |

== Yahoo! OMG Awards ==
| Year | Nominee / work | Award | Result |
|---|---|---|---|
| 2012 | Luna Maya & Ariel Noah | Most Shocking Break-Up | Won |

== Honor Awards, Magazine, Newspaper ==
=== Astro Aruna ===
| Year | Nominee / work | Award | Result |
|---|---|---|---|
| 2007 | Luna Maya | Female Icon of Astro TV | Won |

=== Bintang Magazine ===
| Year | Nominee / work | Award | Result |
|---|---|---|---|
| 2006 | Luna Maya | Most Potential Star | Won |
| 2009 | Luna Maya | Indonesian Star | Won |
| 2009 | Luna Maya | Most Shining Star | Won |

=== FHM Magazine ===
| Year | Nominee / work | Award | Result |
|---|---|---|---|
| 2007 | Luna Maya | The Most Sexiest Female in Indonesia | #3 |

=== Globe Asia Magazine ===
| Year | Nominee / work | Award | Result |
|---|---|---|---|
| 2008 | Luna Maya | Most Richest Indonesian Artist | #5 |

=== Indonesian Asthma Foundation ===
| Year | Nominee / work | Award | Result |
|---|---|---|---|
| 2007 | Luna Maya | Suffer from Asthma Due to Genetic Factors | Won |

=== Lux ===
| Year | Nominee / work | Award | Result |
|---|---|---|---|
| 2006 | Luna Maya | Exclusive Icon | Won |

=== Makarizo Indonesia ===
| Year | Nominee / work | Award | Result |
|---|---|---|---|
| 2010 | Luna Maya | Brand Ambassador for Beauty Products Icon | Won |

=== Mercedes Benz Indonesia ===
| Year | Nominee / work | Award | Result |
|---|---|---|---|
| 2010 | Luna Maya | Official Ambassador of Indonesia | Won |

=== Silet (Entertainment Program of RCTI) ===
| Year | Nominee / work | Award | Result |
|---|---|---|---|
| 2009 | Luna Maya | Razored Artist | Won |

=== Stop Magazine ===
| Year | Nominee / work | Award | Result |
|---|---|---|---|
| 2008 | Luna Maya | The Most Beautiful Woman in Indonesia | Won |

=== Toshiba Indonesia ===
| Year | Nominee / work | Award | Result |
|---|---|---|---|
| 2008 | Luna Maya | Brand Ambassador for Promote Toshiba Products | Won |

=== UN (United Nations) ===
| Year | Nominee / work | Award | Result |
|---|---|---|---|
| 2005 | Luna Maya | World Food Programme of Indonesia | Won |

=== WWF (World Wide Fund for Nature) ===
| Year | Nominee / work | Award | Result |
|---|---|---|---|
| 2008 | Luna Maya | Planting Trees via the Internet | Won |
