= Billy Syahputra =

Indonesian actor and comedian

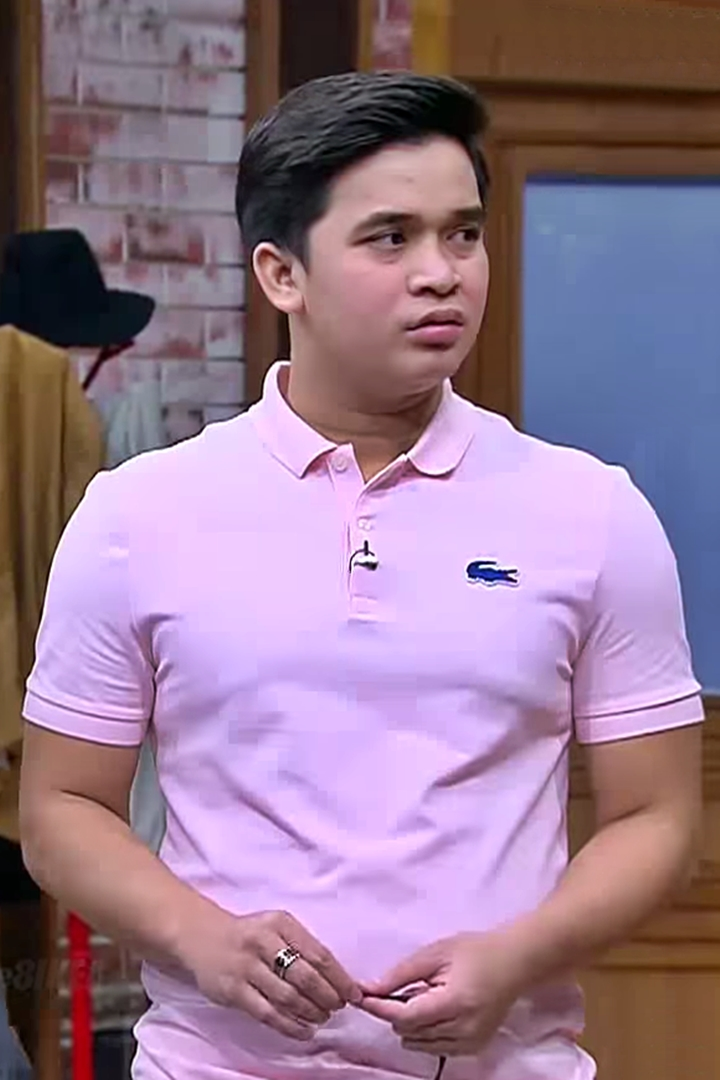
- Syahputra in 2017
- Born: 16 January 1991 (age 35); Jakarta, Indonesia
- Other name: Bang Billy
- Occupations: comedian; presenter; actor
- Years active: 2013–present
- Spouse: Vika Kolesnaya (m. 2025)
- Parent(s): Nur Rachman; Nursidah
- Relatives: Olga Syahputra (brother)

Jhoni Rhoma Billy Iskandar (born 16 January 1991) is an Indonesian actor, presenter, and comedian. He rose to fame for appearing on the Trans TV television show Yuk Keep Smile.

== Career ==
Billy began his career in the world of entertainment when he replaced his brother, Olga Syahputra, who had to be absent from shooting a television show due to illness. Syahputra has appeared in several comedy television shows, such as Opera Van Java on Trans 7, Yuk Keep Smile on Trans TV, Pesbukers on ANTV, and Dahsyat on RCTI. In 2013, Billy began his debut film for played in the horror-comedy film Taman Lawang which had starred with his brother Olga.

During his career, Billy has won several awards in entertainment, such as the "Outstanding Guest Host" award at the 2014 Dahsyatnya Awards, and was also nominated in the "Outstanding Couple" category. He also won "Most Exciting Newcomer" award at the 2014 Global Seru Awards, and "Favorite Newcomer Celebrity" award at the 2014 Insert Awards, beating Aliando Syarief and Cita Citata, while in the category "Most Exciting Newcomer", the other nominees were Fatin Shidqia, Jenita Janet, Syahnaz Sadiqah, and Ahmad Dhani's son, Al Ghazali.

In 2016, Billy had auditioned to dangdut singing competition in Indosiar D'Academy Celebrity and was eliminated in Top 5.

== Personal life ==
He is the fourth out of seven children of Nur Rachman and Nurshida. His brother Olga Syahputra was also a presenter, actor, and comedian. Olga died from meningitis on 27 March 2015.

== Filmography ==
=== Film ===
Year	Title	Role	Notes
2013	Taman Lawang	Cynthia's friend	Cameo
2014	Olga & Billy Lost in Singapore	Billy	Lead role
2015	Warisan Olga	Billy	Lead role

=== Television ===
Year	Title	Role	Notes	Network
2013–2014	Yuk Keep Smile	Himself		Trans TV
2013	Opera Van Java	Himself	Guest	Trans 7
2013	Mission X	Himself	Guest	Trans TV
2013–2014	Dahsyat	Host		RCTI
2013–2014	Pesbukers	Himself		ANTV
2013	Catatan si Olga	Himself		ANTV
2013	Korslet	Himself		Trans TV
2014	Sentil	Himself		Trans TV
2014	Sahurnya Ramadhan	Deputy Commander Security		Trans TV
2014	Ngabuburit	Himself		Trans TV
2014	Happy Happy	Himself		Trans TV
2014	Hati ke Hati Show	Himself	Guest	Trans TV
2014–2015	Late Night Show	Himself		Trans TV
2015	Sahur Itu Indah	Himself		Trans TV
2015	Jurangan Kepo	Himself		RTV
2015	The Kepo	Himself		RTV
2015	Gerobak Cinta Wakwaw	Billy		SCTV
2015	Happy Show	Himself		Trans TV
2015	Real Star	Himself		Trans 7
2016	Everybody Superstar	Himself	Guest	Trans TV

=== Made for TV ===
Year	Title	Role	Notes
2014	Kejar Daku Kau Ku Tendang	Rendy	Lead role
2015	Seguru Seilmu Dilarang Mencintai	Fahri	Lead role
2015	Kutendang Bola Kutangkap Cinta	Roni	Lead role

== Discography ==
=== Single ===
Year	Title	Album	Label
2016	"Pantun Cinta 100%" (feat. Posan Tobing)	Non-album single	CMI Records

=== Video clips ===
Year	Title	Artist
2013	"Goyang Bang Jali"	Denny Cagur
2014	"Bukan Rama Shinta"	Raffi Ahmad

== Awards and nominations ==
Year	Award	Category	Recipients	Result
2013	Bintang RPTI Awards	Favorite Newcomer Presenter	Billy Syahputra	Won
2014	Dahsyatnya Awards	Outstanding Guest Host	Billy Syahputra	Won
2014	Dahsyatnya Awards	Outstanding Couple	Billy Syahputra & Syahnaz Sadiqah	Nominated
2014	Global Seru Awards	Most Exciting Newcomer	Billy Syahputra	Won
2014	Insert Awards	Favorite Newcomer Celebrity	Billy Syahputra	Won
2016	Inbox Awards	Most Inbox Guest Host	Billy Syahputra	Nominated
