= 2014 Dahsyatnya Awards =

Indonesian music awards ceremony in 2014

- Date: January 21, 2014
- Location: Jakarta International Expo, Kemayoran, Central Jakarta
- Hosted by: Raffi Ahmad; Luna Maya; Olga Syahputra; Ayu Dewi; Denny Cagur

Highlights
- Most awards: JKT48 (3)
- Most nominations: Raffi Ahmad (4)

Television/radio coverage
- Network: RCTI

The 2014 Dahsyatnya Awards was an awards show for Indonesian musicians. It was the sixth annual show. The show was held on January 21, 2014, at the Jakarta International Expo in Kemayoran, Central Jakarta. The awards show was hosted by Raffi Ahmad, Luna Maya, Olga Syahputra, Ayu Dewi, and Denny Cagur. The awards ceremonies will held theme for "Dahsyatnya Cinta Indonesia".

In 2015, This awards show won the Favorite Special Events award at the Panasonic Gobel Awards.

Raffi Ahmad led the nominations with four categories, followed by JKT48 and Syahrini with three nominations. JKT48 was the biggest winner of the night, taking home three awards for Outstanding Stage Act, Outstanding Collaboration Duo/Group, and Outstanding Song for "River".

== Winners and nominees ==
Winners are listed first and highlighted in boldface.

=== SMS and social media ===
Outstanding Song	Outstanding Newcomer
**"River" — JKT48**; "Intim Berdua" — ADA Band; "Jodoh Pasti Bertemu" — Afgan; "Cinta Sejati" — Bunga Citra Lestari; "Aku Memilih Setia" — Fatin Shidqia; "Lumpuhkan Ingatanku" — Geisha; "Hidup Untukmu Mati Tanpamu" — Noah; "Rindu Ini" — SM*SH; "Cinta Butuh Waktu" — Vierra	**Fatin Shidqia**; 3Composers; Adeff; Mikha Angelo; Novita Dewi; Sheryl Sheinafia; Tasya Tania; Tongam Valentino
Outstanding Male Solo Singer	Outstanding Female Solo Singer
**Afgan**; Cakra Khan; Judika; Marcell; Petra Sihombing; Sandhy Sondoro; Sammy Simorangkir; Vidi Aldiano	**Syahrini**; Andien; Angel Pieters; Ashanty; Astrid; Bunga Citra Lestari; Citra Scholastika; Mulan Jameela; Raisa
Outstanding Collaboration Duo/Group	Outstanding Band
**JKT48**; Duo Maia; Judika & Duma; Project Pop; Rio Febrian (featuring Margareth); Tangga; The Finest Tree; The Virgin; Vidi Aldiano (featuring Sherina)	**Repvblik**; ADA Band; Geisha; Last Child; Noah; Setia Band; Ungu; Vierratale; Wali
Outstanding Boyband/Girlband	Outstanding Stage Act
**Super Girlies**; 7icons; Cherrybelle; Coboy Junior; Max 5; Princess; SM*SH; Swittins	**JKT48**; 3 Djanggo; ADA Band; The Changcuters; Syahrini
Outstanding Guest Host	Outstanding Child Artist
**Billy Syahputra**; Ajun Perwira; Chand Kelvin; Lolita Agustine; Marcel Chandrawinata; Mikha Tambayong; Pica Priscilla; Tiffany Orie; Tina Toonita; Syahnaz Sadiqah	**Chelsea (Idola Cilik)**; Afiqah; Bagas & Difa; Jarkidz; Kiesha Alvaro; Lollipop; Popcorn; Super7; Tegar Septian
Outstanding Guest Star	Outstanding Couple
**Iskandar Widjaja**; Dash Berlin & Emma Hewitt; Paolo Maldini & Andriy Shevchenko; Jay Chou; Horace Grant & Rafer Alston; Amiaya; Megan Young; Nick Vujicic; Hari	**Raffi Ahmad & Nagita Slavina**; Billy Syahputra & Syahnaz Sadiqah; Judika & Duma; Kevin Aprilio & Elma Agustine; Raffi Ahmad & Mikha Tambayong; Raffi Ahmad & Syahrini
Outstanding Spectators/Community	Outstanding City
**NTMC Polri & Korlantas**; Jakarta Hena Community; Komunitas Drummer Gilang Ramadhan Kelapa Gading Club; Batalyon Pashkas 461; HDCI Jakarta; Indonesia Pizza Spinning Community; Sekolah NASA; Saung Dji'ih Community	**Palembang**; Bogor; Surabaya; Yogyakarta
Outstanding Dangdut Singer	Outstanding Dance
**Ayu Ting Ting**; 2 Unyu Unyu; Denny Cagur; Inul Daratista; Jenita Janet; Juwita Bahar & Jelita Bahar; Siti Badriah; Trio Macan; Zaskia Gotik	**Colek Dance — Duo Sabun Colek**; Sirkuit Dance — Manda Cello; Ngebor Dance — Inul Daratista; Manjur Dance — Siti Badriah; Itik Dance — Zaskia Gotik; Bang Jali Dance — Denny Cagur
Outstanding Enormity of Indonesia	Outstanding Moment
**Sanggar Ayodya Pala**; Gayam 16; Gigi Art of Dance; Handbell Choir; Michelle Dalang Cilik; Sanggar Delima; Sanggar Rinari	**When Raffi Ahmad back**; Ayu Dewi give birth; Ayu Ting Ting vent Enji; Phenomenal Bang Jali dance; Olga Syahputra sick
Outstanding Choreographer	Outstanding Hottest Artist
**Gigi Dance Company**	**Ayu Ting Ting**

=== Jury ===
Outstanding Video Clip	Outstanding Model Video Clip
**"Hilang" — Mulan Jameela**	**Chelsea Islan — "Tak Lagi Sama" (performed by Noah)**
Outstanding Video Clip Director	Outstanding Most Diligently Perform Artist
**Mohammad Irsan — "Gara-Gara Kahitna" (performed by Project Pop)**	**Zaskia Gotik**

== Awards ==
Year	Award	Category	Results
2015	Panasonic Gobel Awards	Favorite Special Events	Won
