= Olga Syahputra =

Indonesian comedian, actor, television presenter, and singer (1983–2015)

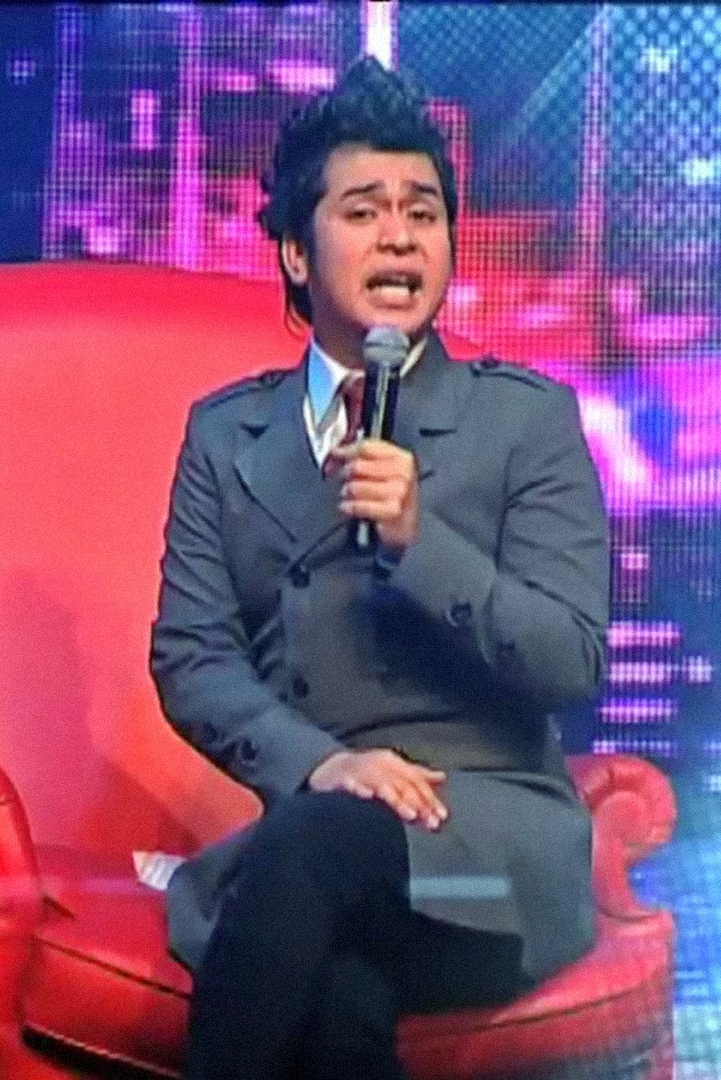
- Born: Yoga Syahputra; 8 February 1983; Jakarta, Indonesia
- Died: 27 March 2015 (aged 32); Singapore
- Burial place: Malaka Cemetery
- Occupations: Actor; comedian; singer; presenter
- Years active: 2004–2014
- Relatives: Billy Syahputra (brother)

Yoga Syahputra (8 February 1983 – 27 March 2015), better known by the stage name Olga Syahputra, was an Indonesian comedian, actor, presenter, and singer. He was the brother of actor Billy Syahputra. His accolades included Indonesia Kids Choice Award and Panasonic Gobel Awards. He died from meningitis in 2015, aged 32.

== Early life ==
Olga was born Yoga Syahputra on February 8, 1983 in Jakarta, Indonesia, as the eldest child and son of the seven children of Nur Rachman and Nurshida. His brothers were Nurdianto, Utoyo "Ute" Rahman, and Billy Syahputra, an actor, while his sisters were Renny Nurmah, Rena Oktapia, and Rossa Juwita. He loved to ask for a photo and signature of his idol.

== Personal life ==
=== Relationships ===
Olga was in a relationship with a student in 2011 which he keep private from public, but had already introduced the girl to his parents. He then dated actress Jessica Iskandar where she stated that she was happy and confused with him, but revealed that they were only close because of circumstances. She later wrote their story in her book Jedar Power Love Life Lord which was released on December 21, 2014 and stated that she miss Olga whom at that time undergoing treatment. In 2014, Julia Perez revealed that Olga was in relationship with actress Gista Putri. However, both of them never confirmed their relationship and remained close friend until Olga's death in 2015. Gista later married Wishnutama, a journalist, on September 19, that year.

=== Illness and death ===
In 2012, Olga suffered a fall and was rushed to the hospital due to fatigue which causes his relatives to panic, including his girlfriend, Jessica Iskandar, whom cried at that time, and his friend, Julia Perez, called him many times. On August 4, he was hospitalized at Medistra Hospital and there was a lump on his neck due to bacteria which became increasingly swollen in September, and underwent treatment in Singapore on November 5. In April 2014, Olga suffered a second fall and was rushed to Pondok Indah Hospital, and was diagnosed with meningitis on April 29, which was caused by his unhealthy lifestyle. He was moved to Mount Elizabeth Hospital on May 4, where he underwent an intensive treatment and received a support from First Lady Ani Yudhoyono who posted a picture of butterfly to pray for his wellness, and received 8,000 likes in an hour. His condition began to improved in June and he was reported to be returning to Indonesia, but he later slipped into a coma. On March 27, 2015, the hospital reported about his worsening condition to his manager which later rushed from Jakarta to Singapore along with his brothers to be at his side. Olga later died at 16:17 WIB (UTC+07:00) at the age of 32, with his parents by his side and left no will. His death later went to became a worldwide trending topic with a hashtag #RIPOlgaSyahputra on Twitter.

His body was flown to Indonesia on March 28 and was laid at his residence in Duren Sawit, East Jakarta. He was buried at Malaka Cemetery in Pondok Kelapa and his grave was crowded with mourners as of March 29, which caused it to sink as deep as 5 cm. Among the mourners were Camelia Malik, Hidayat Nur Wahid, Julia Perez, Luna Maya, Jessica Iskandar, and Tukul Arwana.

== Career ==
Olga started his career by joining Ananda Studio owned by Aditya Gumay as an extra and was offered a role in the movie Lenong Bocah (2004) along with his colleague, Mellisa Grace, who credited him as passionate, improvisation master, and natural. Without money, he sold a refrigerator to pay for the classes. His friend, actor Bertrand Antolin, later purchased a new refrigerator for him. Olga later made his film debut by starring in Gumay's directed Tina Toon & Lenong Bocah The Movie (2004) in a supporting role. He later received positive responses and began to star in soap operas, such as Senandung Masa Puber, Kawin Gantung and Si Yoyo. Olga later worked as an assistant for dangdut singer Rita Sugiarto and became a presenter for Ngidam on SCTV paired with Jeremy Thomas. He appeared in Jangan Cium Gue, followed by Extravaganza ABG in 2005 as a presenter, and also appeared as presenter on the show Ceriwis in 2007, along with Indra Bekti and Indy Barends on Trans TV, which later popularized his name. He then starred in several films, such as Skandal Cinta Babi Ngepet (2008) and Mau Lagi, which was banned and only got permission to circulate when the title was changed to Cintaku Selamanya (2008). Olga later started his career as a singer by releasing two singles: "Hancur Hatiku" and "Jangan Ganggu Aku Lagi", which was composed by Charly Van Houten and recorded by Nagaswara.

In 2008, Olga became a TV presenter for the music show Dahsyat on RCTI along with Raffi Ahmad and Luna Maya, and was paid up to Rp. 30.000.000 which he later used to start a clothing business. His co-presenter since March 2011 was Jessica Iskandar, whom he also had relationship with at that time. He then won several awards, such as a Panasonic Gobel Awards for Most Favourite Variety Show Music Presenter and Favourite Comedian in 2009 and 2010, respectively, followed by an Indonesian Kids Choice Award for Most Favourite Presenter in 2009. In 2012, Olga was nominated for three categories on Panasonic Gobel Awards, such as Music and Variety Show Presenter, Entertainment Talkshow Presenter, Reality Show Presenter, and Most Favourite Comedian. He later starred in the horror-comedy Taman Lawang (2013) as Cynthia, a transvestite resident of Taman Lawang, followed by a role in Olga & Billy Lost in Singapore (2014) in which he could not attend the premiere to, due to undergoing treatment in Singapore. In 2014, Olga was cast in Warisan Olga (2015) co-starring his brother Billy Syahputra which was produced by Rapi Films and CMI Productions, and filmed in Puncak, Umang Island, Banten, and Puecang Island. But he died before filming concluded and the director, Raymond T. Handaya, later reused the scenes from Olga & Billy Lost in Singapore (2014) and released the film posthumously in November 2015.

== Screen persona and reception ==
Olga's screen persona focused on his ability who is able to make the audience laugh with his limited English skills, and his appearance as a transvestite. This made him became the highest paid actor and he can appear on up to four programs every day, and he always gets good ratings which makes him a hot spot for television stations. His role as a bully victim was to provoke laughter from the audience, then he replaced it by playing the role of a bully and succeeded in provoking more laughter from the audience, but made him face various problems because he was considered to offend other people's feelings. Olga's appearance in the sahur program on Trans TV every Ramadan with comedians Komeng and Adul had succeeded in becoming the audience's favorite. His comedy technique and characteristics later inspired several comedians, such as Anwar BAB and Mimi Peri, whom sometimes referred as his reincarnation.

== Controversies ==
In 2009, Syahputra was reprimanded by Indonesian Broadcasting Commission for saying penis during Dahsyat live broadcast. He was reprimanded for second times when he mentioned a jokes with Sule that is considered as an insult to rape victims. He also was protested along with another artist during Wayang Bandel program, such as Jessica Iskandar, Ayu Dewi, and Yudi Sembako, for making a parodies of Hindu symbol which is considered insulting and inappropriate visualization. In 2012, Olga was sued by Islamic Defenders Front for making a jokes that is considered insulting Islam. During Pesbukers show on ANTV, he made a joke at Julia Perez who trying to provoke laughter by saying "assalamualaikum" which he later replied "You keep going assalamualaikum, you look like a beggar." Chairman of FPI in Jakarta, Salim bin Umar (also known as Habib Selon), said that Olga had no right to live on earth before apologizing to Muslims. His colleague, Olla Ramlan, later stated that he did not intended to insult any party and the joke is still rational.

== Discography ==
=== Single ===
Year	Title	Album	Label
2009	"Hancur Hatiku"	Non-album single	Big Indie Nagaswara
2010	"Jangan Ganggu Aku Lagi"	Non-album single	Big Indie Nagaswara

== Works ==
=== Film ===
Year	Title	Role	Notes
2004	Tina Toon dan Lenong Bocah The Movie	Himself	Cameo
2008	Susahnya Jadi Perawan	Himself	Cameo
2008	Mau Lagi?	The Boys	
2008	Basahhh...	Toddy	
2008	Mas Suka, Masukin Aja-Besar Kecil It's Okay	Sissy	
2011	Pacar Hantu Perawan	Yoga	
2012	Kung Fu Pocong Perawan	Bohlam	Lead role
2013	Taman Lawang	Chyntia	Lead role
2014	Olga & Billy Lost in Singapore	Olga	Lead role
2015	Warisan Olga	Olga	Lead role

=== Television ===
Year	Title	Role	Notes	Network
2003–2004	Senandung Masa Puber			Trans TV
2003–2006	Si Yoyo			RCTI; SCTV
2004–2005	Kawin Gantung			SCTV
2007	Doo Bee Doo			RCTI
2008	Mr. Olga	Olga	Lead role	RCTI
2009	Tarzan Cilik	Olga		RCTI

==== Comedy shows ====
- Jangan Cium Gue
- Extravaganza ABG
- New Prime Time
- Saatnya Kita Sahur
- Opera Van Java
- OKB
- Seger Bener
- Sinden Gosip
- Wayang On Stage
- Pesbukers (ANTV)
- Waktunya Kita Sahur (Trans TV)
- Wayang Bandel (Trans TV)
- Yuk Kita Sahur/Yuk Keep Smile/YKS (Trans TV)
- Campur - Campur (ANTV)

==== Variety, talk and game shows ====
- Ngidam (SCTV)
- Ceriwis (Trans TV)
- Akhirnya Datang Juga (Trans TV)
- Gong Show (Trans TV)
- Dahsyat (RCTI)
- Dangdut Never Dies (TPI)
- OMG (ANTV)
- Online (Trans TV)
- Piala Dunia Tawa (TPI)
- Apa Ini Apa Itu (RCTI)
- Catatan Si Olga (ANTV)
- Target Operasi (RCTI)
- Korslet (Trans TV)
- Family Minute to Win It Indonesia (Shine TV)

== Legacy ==
In 2017, Olga's inheritance was used to renovated a prayer room in Duren Sawit which later renamed to Birrul Walidain Olga Syahputra. He also brought a change in the number of presenters in the television industry from two to four on music shows because of Olga's appearance as an additional host on Ceriwis (2007) which was initially just a gimmick but turned out to be successful in entertaining the audience. In 2020, many Indonesian netizens wrote on Twitter that they missed Olga's appearance on television program during Ramadan.
