= Cut Tari =

Indonesian actress and model

- Born: Cut Tari Aminah Anasya; November 1, 1977 (age 47); Jakarta, Indonesia
- Occupations: Celebrity; Presenter; Model
- Years active: 1991 - present
- Height: 162 cm (5 ft 4 in)
- Spouse: Johannes Yusuf Subrata (m. 2004–2014) Richard Kevin (m. 2019)
- Children: 1
- Parent: Teuku Joeransjah

Cut Tari Aminah Anasya (born 1 November 1977) is an Indonesian soap opera actress, model, and presenter.

== Career ==
Her acting career began when she was invited by Harry de Fretes to guest star in the comedy soap opera Dongeng Langit. She then got an offer to appear in Sisi-Sisi Dunia in a supporting role. She has also appeared in the soap operas Perjalanan, Melati, Doaku Harapanku, Kafe Biru, Dewi Fortuna, Tersanjung, and Rosalinda.

== Personal life ==
Cut Tari Aminah Anasya was born on 1 November 1977, in Jakarta. She is the third child of four siblings of Teuku Joesransjah and is of Aceh-Minangkabau descent. She graduated in Stamford College, Jakarta. She married Johannes Yusuf Subrata on 9 January 2004 and divorced in 2014. They have one daughter named Sydney, born on 10 October 2007.

Five years being single, Cut Tari married with Richard Kevin on 12 December 2019 in Jakarta

== Sex tape scandal ==
Tari was the subject of gossip in 2010 when a pornographic video of her with singer Ariel was posted online. The event was widely covered in newspapers in Indonesia and several foreign countries. She lost her job as infotainment host of the show Insert on Trans TV. At first she insisted it was not her in the video, but later said it was indeed her. She had not known of the existence of the video before it started to circulate. Her husband, Johannes Yusuf Subrata, initially remained firm and even proud of her courage, and said that he would not divorce her. They eventually did divorce, in 2014.

After a hiatus of more than a year, Tari began co-hosting the talk show Friends with Indra Herlambang and Uli Herdinansyah, who had been fellow announcers on the show Insert. Tari returned to host the show Insert in 2013.

== Filmography ==
=== Television ===
Year	Title	Role	Notes	Network
1993	Dongeng Langit		Guest Star	RCTI
1993	Sisi-Sisi Dunia		Supporting role	
1997	Perjalanan		Lead role	SCTV
1998	Melati		Supporting role	SCTV
1998–2000	Doaku Harapanku		Supporting role	RCTI
1999–2000	Pena Asmara		Lead role	Indosiar
1999	Kafe Biru		Lead role	Indosiar
2000	Dewi Fortuna		Supporting role	SCTV
2003	Sentuhan Lembut	Bintang	Lead role	Indosiar
2003–2004	Roda-Roda Cinta		Supporting role	SCTV
2003–2004	Bulan dan Bintang		Supporting role	SCTV
2003–2010; 2013	Insert	Herself	Infotainment show Nominated – 2005 Panasonic Awards for Favorite Infotainment Presenter; Nominated – 2006 Panasonic Awards for Favorite Infotainment Presenter; Nominated – 2007 Panasonic Awards for Favorite Infotainment Presenter; Won – 2009 Panasonic Awards for Favorite Infotainment Presenter; Nominated – 2010 Panasonic Gobel Awards for Favorite Infotainment Presenter; Nominated – 2011 Panasonic Gobel Awards for Favorite Infotainment Presenter	Trans TV
2004	Tersanjung 6	Indah	Lead role	Indosiar
2005	So What Gitu Loh!	Rara		Trans TV
2006	Ratapan Anak Tiri	Rinda	Lead role	RCTI
2006	Hidayah			Trans TV
2006–2007	Hikayah			Trans TV
2006	Aku Bukan Aku	Nia	Lead role	Indosiar
2008	OKB	Herself	Comedy show	Trans 7
2008	Pelangi	Sita	Supporting role	SCTV
2008	Cinta Intan	Lita	Supporting role	SCTV
2009	Cinta Bunga 2		Supporting role	SCTV
2009–2010	Hafizah	Vani	Supporting role	SCTV
2010–2011	Kemilau Cinta Kamila	Tari	Supporting role	RCTI
2011–2012	Dia atau Diriku	Sofie	Supporting role	SCTV
2011	Saudara Oesman			
2012–2013	Raja dan Aku	Hanin	Supporting role	Global TV
2013	Aku Bukan Anak Haram	Aliyah	Lead role Nominated – 2014 Festival Film Bandung for Best Soap Opera Female Leading Role	Indosiar
2013	Friends	Herself	Infotainment show	ANTV
2014	Emak Ijah Pengen Ke Mekah	Cici Ping Ping	Supporting role	SCTV

== TV commercials ==
- Pixy
- Belia
- Mie Sedaap
- Kentucky Fried Chicken
- AC Sayonara Sharp

== Awards and nominations ==
Year	Award	Category	Recipients	Results
2005	Panasonic Awards	Favorite Infotainment Presenter	Insert	Nominated
2006	Panasonic Awards	Favorite Infotainment Presenter	Insert	Nominated
2007	Panasonic Awards	Favorite Infotainment Presenter	Insert	Nominated
2009	Panasonic Awards	Favorite Infotainment Presenter	Insert	Won
2010	Panasonic Awards	Favorite Infotainment Presenter	Insert	Nominated
2010	Johnny Andrean Awards	The Best Make Up for Female Presenter	Cut Tari	Won
2011	Panasonic Gobel Awards	Favorite Infotainment Presenter	Insert	Nominated
2013	Yahoo! OMG Awards	Sexiest Mom	Cut Tari	Nominated
2014	Festival Film Bandung	Best Soap Opera Female Leading Role	Aku Bukan Anak Haram	Nominated
2014	Yahoo! Celebrity Awards	Sexiest Mom	Cut Tari	Nominated
2014	Yahoo! Celebrity Awards	Most Shocking Break Up	Cut Tari & Yusuf Subrata	Nominated
