= Maaher At-Thuwailibi =

Indonesian Islamic preacher (1992–2021)

- Born: Soni Eranata; 14 July 1992; Medan, Indonesia
- Died: 8 February 2021 (aged 28); Jakarta, Indonesia
- Occupation: Islamic preacher

Maaher At-Thuwailibi (Arabic: ماهر الطويلبي, romanized: Māhir aṭ-Ṭuwaylibī, 14 July 1992 – 8 February 2021) was an Indonesian Islamic preacher based in Bogor. He primarily preached on various social media platforms, such as Twitter, YouTube, Instagram, and TikTok.

== Early life ==
Born Soni Eranata in Medan, At-Thuwailibi was the youngest of three children born to a rather secular family. He moved to Bogor when he became an adult. His teachers often described his preaching tone as similar to Mahir al-Mu'aiqly and dubbed him "Maaher At-Thuwailibi", or "name of the questioner".

== Career ==
He was seen as tough and fiery, though humorous. His popularity on social media enabled him to provide assistance to working-class citizens throughout the COVID-19 pandemic in Indonesia. He supplemented his income by giving lectures and selling books and perfumes.

At-Thuwailibi generated controversy through his married life and his social media statements. In 2015, his ex-wife, Susi Wiwati, accused him of domestic violence and child abuse.

In November 2019, social media activist Permadi Arya accused him of making death threats through social media, after he had said that Arya deserved to be killed for blasphemy. The pair were interviewed on the television program Apa Kabar Indonesia, aired on tvOne. Arya alleged that At-Thuwailibi had attempted to justify terrorism in the name of Islam, while At-Thuwailibi stated that the Fiqh teachings justified slaughtering those who insult Islam. Hostilities between the two continued after the program.

At-Thuwailibi began feuding with actress Nikita Mirzani when hardline Islamist scholar, Muhammad Rizieq Shihab, returned from Saudi Arabia in November 2020. Mirzani filmed a satirical video in which she called Shihab a "medicine man" for causing a large crowd to gather at Soekarno–Hatta International Airport during the COVID-19 pandemic. Al-Thuwailibi demanded that she make a public apology for this comment insulting an Islamic leader, and if she refused, he threatened to bring a crowd of 800 people to surround her house.

On 3 December 2020, he was arrested by the Criminal Investigation Agency for allegedly insulting one of the Nahdlatul Ulama elders, Muhammad Luthfi bin Yahya. He insisted that he did not mean to insult bin Yahya, and that it was a misunderstanding. He stated that he intended to meet bin Yahya in person and apologize for his comments.

Maaher At-Thuwailibi died in police custody in Jakarta on 8 February 2021 at the age of 28.
