= The Master (Indonesian TV series) =

2009–2012 Indonesian reality TV series

- Genre: Magic
- Developed by: RCTI
- Presented by: Nico Siahaan | Adi Nugroho
- Judges: Deddy Corbuzier; Romy Rafael; Melissa Karim
- Country of origin: Indonesia
- Original language: Indonesian
- No. of seasons: 5

Production
- Executive producers: Untung Pranoto (2009); Fabian Dharmawan (2012)
- Producers: Fabian Dharmawan (2009); Rachmat Welly and Sonny Palandeng (2012)
- Running time: 180 minutes or more (depends on the finalist's show)

Original release
- Network: RCTI
- Release: 6 February 2009 – 10 February 2012

The Master is an Indonesian reality television show aired on RCTI. It is a competition between stage magicians in which the winner is decided by viewer vote. It first aired 6 February 2009, and has the slogan "Mencari Bintang Tanpa Mantera" ("Finding a star without charm"). The show consists of some magicians performing their magic and trying to become The Master. In every episode, one contestant who receives the lowest SMS vote is eliminated from the competition. After each act, the judges (3–4) give their comments. The host is Nico Siahaan. The Master became Indonesia's most popular TV series, with 11.4 million viewers.

Produced by Fabian Dharmawan, who is also the show runner for Indonesian Idol 2012 and X Factor Indonesia, The Master still holds a record breaking performance in TV ratings, 11.4/44 in audience share in the finale of The Master: Duel Inauguration Limbad VS Joe Sandy in 2009.

The Master boosted the popularity of judge Deddy Corbuzier and started a new wave of magic entertainment in Indonesia.

== Performers ==
=== Host ===
Year	Season	Host
2009	1	Nico Siahaan
2009	2	Nico Siahaan
2009	3	Nico Siahaan
2009	4	Nico Siahaan
2012	5	Adi Nugroho

=== Judge ===
Year	Season	Chief Judge	Judge (2)	Judge (3)	Guest Judge
2009	1	Deddy Corbuzier	Romy Rafael	Melissa Karim	–
2009	2	Deddy Corbuzier	Romy Rafael	Melissa Karim	–
2009	3	Deddy Corbuzier	Romy Rafael	Melissa Karim	–
2009	4	Deddy Corbuzier	Romy Rafael	Melissa Karim	–
2012	5	Deddy Corbuzier	Romy Rafael	–	Nadya Siddiqa; Jessica Iskandar; Luna Maya

== Winner ==
Year	Season	Winner	Runner up
2009	1	Joe Sandy	Abu Marlo
2009	2	Limbad	Denny Darko
2009	3	Rizuki	Bayu Gendeng
2009	4	Cosmo	Ivan
2012	5	Oge Arthemus	Bow Vernon

== Achievement ==
- 2010 Panasonic Gobel Awards for favorite talent show
