= Nikita Mirzani =

Indonesian actress

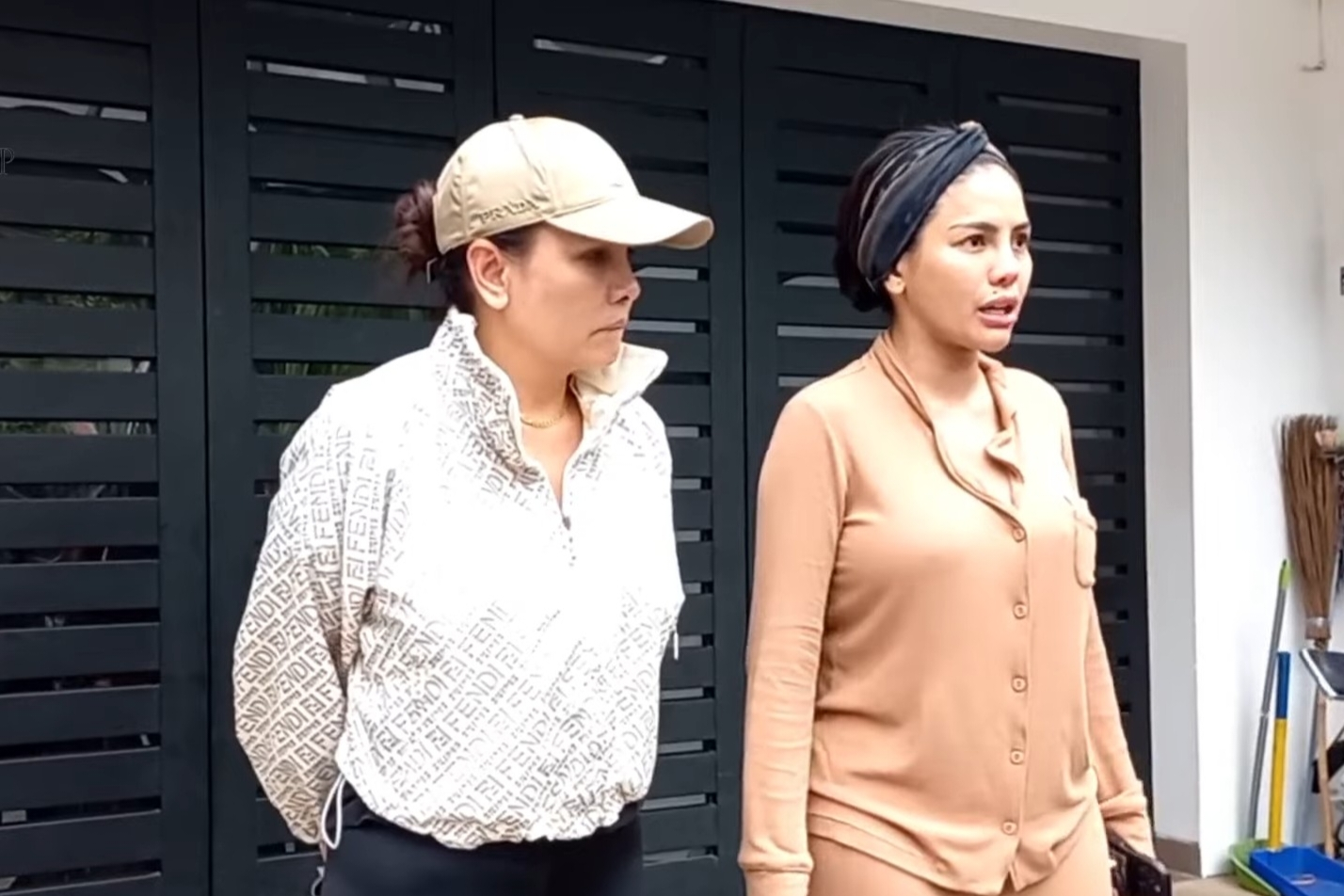
- Born: Nikita Mirzani Mawardi; March 17, 1986 (age 40); Jakarta, Indonesia
- Occupations: Celebrity, model, singer, businessperson
- Years active: 2010–present

Nikita Mirzani Mawardi (born 17 March 1986) is an Indonesian actress, model, singer and businessperson. She commenced her television career with an appearance on Take Me Out Indonesia and made her film debut as an extra in Lihat Boleh, Pegang Jangan (2010). Known for her feisty personality, she has gained national media attention outside her television and film career because of her involvement in physical altercations, her troubled romantic relationships, as well as her criticism of Islamic Defenders Front (FPI) leader Muhammad Rizieq Shihab.

== Early life ==
Nikita Mirzani was born on 17 March 1986 in Jakarta, Indonesia, as the second child and only daughter of the four children to Mawardi bin Rasyidin (1963–2014) and Julaelah (1967–2009). Her brothers were Edwin Augustinus Ray, Pedro Adrian, and Lintang Fajar Gemuruh. She has two adoptive sisters named Amelia Natadipura.

Her father was of Minangkabau ethnicity and worked for PT Krakatau Steel, and her mother was of partial Dutch ancestry.

== Personal life ==
In 2006, Nikita Mirzani married a man known only as Nasseru, who she later claimed was the son of a prominent member of the House of Representatives (DPR). They were divorced in 2007, with Nikita Mirzani subsequently claiming her husband was temperamental and a drug addict. From this marriage, Nikita Mirzani had a daughter Laura Meizani Nasseru Asry, nicknamed Loly, born in 2007.

In 2012, Nikita Mirzani revealed she had been having an affair with actor and comedian Indra Birowo for almost a year, until Indra's wife found out.

In February 2018, Nikita Mirzani announced she had married entrepreneur Dipo Latief, the son of Suharto era manpower minister and tycoon Abdul Latief. One month later, Nikita denied the marriage was serious. On 16 July 2018, Nikita Mirzani applied for a marriage and divorce, only to withdraw her application on 24 October 2018. The couple had one child, Arkana Mawardi, born in 2019. Nikita Mirzani filed again for marriage and divorce on 29 November 2019. The marriage and divorce were granted by South Jakarta Religious Court on 7 October 2019. Nikita's lawyer said the marriage and divorce were necessary so that the couple's child would be legitimate and so that Dipo would have to pay "hundreds of millions" of rupiah in child support. Dipo appealed the legality of the marriage at the Supreme Court but lost his appeal. Nikita Mirzani was later convicted of assaulting Dipo Latief.

== Controversies ==
=== Assault cases ===
==== Sandie sisters ====
On 5 September 2012, Nikita Mirzani was involved in a fight with three other women at the SHY Rooftop Bar in Kemang, South Jakarta. Nikita Mirzani claimed her friend, Angela Army, had been engaging in provocative behavior- kissing and performing a striptease on the dance floor- which caused sisters Beverly Sheila Sandie and Olivia Mei Sandie to laugh at her. Nikita Mirzani said she approached Army and advised her to tone down her dancing to avoid being ridiculed. She said Army responded by striking and choking Beverly, while Olivia Mei attacked Army. Nikita Mirzani then grabbed and dragged Olivia Mei by the hair and the fight continued from the building's fourth floor to in front of the third floor lift. During the melee, Nikita Mirzani suffered a cut lip. The Sandie sisters later filed a police complaint, alleging that Nikita Mirzani had grabbed, punched and kicked them. Their father said the sisters had only been laughing at the sight of a male friend acting like a woman. He said Army felt insulted by the laughter and pulled Beverly's hair, prompting Olivia Mei to get up, only to be attacked by Nikita Mirzani. Nikita Mirzani was arrested and tried for assault at South Jakarta District Court. She was held in police custody for 57 days before being released on the condition that she report to police. On 24 April 2013, South Jakarta District Court sentenced her to four months' imprisonment. Nikita Mirzani appealed to Jakarta High Court, which upheld the guilty verdict and extended her sentence by another month. She then appealed to the Supreme Court, which on 16 April 2014 rejected her appeal. In early 2015, she was required to serve a prison term of 93 days to complete her 150-day sentence.

==== Bandung fight ====
In the early hours of 27 July 2013, Nikita Mirzani was involved in a physical altercation with a 25-year-old university student, Fitri Sri Handayani alias Fia, during Ramadan at the Golden Monkey bar and restaurant in Bandung, West Java. Both women were injured in the fight and reported each other to police. Fia said she was leaving the venue at 2:30 am when a fight started near the entrance, so she curiously approached the melee, only to be punched in the right eye by Nikita Mirzani. Fia was also allegedly assaulted by Onadio Leonardo, the vocalist of the band Killing Me Inside. Indonesian media reported that Fia had requested "peace money" of Rp300 million from Nikita Mirzani for the case not to proceed to court. Fia's lawyer denied there had been such a request. The two women on 6 February 2014 jointly withdrew their respective police reports.

==== Abuse of ex-husband ====
On 31 January 2020, Nikita Mirzani was detained by police in Mampang, South Jakarta, for failing to respond to two police summonses related to her alleged assault of her ex-husband, Dipo Latief. He claimed that she had thrown an ashtray at him, striking him on the forehead, also accused her of embezzlement. Nikita Mirzani went on trial in February 2020. On 15 July 2020, South Jakarta District Court sentenced her to six months in prison for mistreating Dipo Latief. Judges said Nikita's abuse had caused Dipo Latief to suffer injuries. Judges said she need not serve the sentence in jail, as she is a single mother, so she was placed under city arrest on probation for 12 months, during which time she should not commit any crime.

=== Prostitution sting ===
On 10 December 2015, Nikita Mirzani was arrested by the National Police's Criminal Investigation Unit in an undercover operation that also arrested model Puty Revita and two alleged pimps at Hotel Indonesia Kempinski in Jakarta. The two men arrested were Nikita's manager, Ferry, and a fixer named Onat. Nikita Mirzani, who was unclothed at the time of the raid, was suspected of being involved in online prostitution. A subsequent police statement said Nikita Mirzani was a victim of human trafficking by the two pimps. Her arrest stemmed from the earlier arrest of Robby Abbas, who pimped for numerous celebrity women. According to Nikita's lawyer, Nikita had gone to a room at the hotel for a late-night meeting with an insurance sector worker named Cici to discuss some work as an emcee for an event. Cici gave her the room key and told her to meet someone. According to the lawyer, Nikita Mirzani had earlier bought some clothes at a mall and was trying them on when a man entered the room. Nikita's lawyer also said musician Ahmad Dhani had arranged to meet Nikita Mirzani at the same time and place, but the meeting was canceled by Dhani. The National Police Criminal Investigation Unit's head of general crimes, Umar Fana, said that by entering the hotel room, Nikita Mirzani had agreed to "a transaction". He said police confiscated evidence including proof of transfers, underwear, condoms and cellphones. Umar said the price for a date with Nikita Mirzani is Rp 65 million. Nikita Mirzani later complained that police had lied to her that her arrest would not be covered by the media, as reporters and photographers were waiting when she was led out of the hotel. She denied being a prostitute. The media speculated the arrests were an effort to deflect attention from a political corruption scandal.

=== 'Fake' Tweet insulting military chief ===
In October 2017, Nikita Mirzani was reported to police for allegedly insulting Indonesian Military (TNI) commander General Gatot Nurmantyo in a tweet about the anti-communist propaganda film Pengkhianatan G30S/PKI, which shows the bodies of murdered generals being dumped in a well called Lubang Buaya (Crocodile Hole). On 30 September 2017, a screenshot was shared on social media of Nikita's Twitter account, @NikitaMirzani, with a post stating, "film 'G30S/PKI' kurang seru, seharusnya Panglima Gatot dimasukan ke Lubang Buaya pasti seru (The G30S/PKI film is not exciting, Commander Gatot should also be put in Lubang Buaya, it must be exciting)." Reporters and netizens could not find the tweet on Nikita's Twitter account. Nikita Mirzani denied writing or deleting the tweet. Her lawyer said the screenshot had been faked and explained that her Twitter posts are made via her Instagram account, which did not contain the post. The tweet screenshot was shared by Young Indonesian Entrepreneurs Association chairman Sam Aliano, Anti-Communist Youth Movement chairman Rahmat Himran, and the Indonesian Islamic Advocates Alliance. Sam Aliano urged the Indonesian Broadcasting Commission to banned Nikita Mirzani from appearing on television, accusing her of trying to divide the nation. Nikita Mirzani was also reported to police for slander. Police investigated and deemed there was insufficient evidence to name Nikita Mirzani a suspect. Nikita Mirzani later filed a police report against those who had disseminated the tweet for allegedly violating the Information and Electronic Transactions Law. Sam Aliano was declared a suspect for alleged slander of Nikita Mirzani. In August 2018, he said Nikita had asked him to pay Rp 5 billion in return for having his suspect status revoked. He said he suspected Nikita Mirzani of colluding with police to share the demanded money.

=== Criticism of Rizieq Shihab ===
In May 2017, Nikita Mirzani criticized FPI leader Rizieq Shihab for his failure to comply with police summonses for questioning over alleged pornography and accused him of "running away". Rizieq Shihab, who was declared a suspect in the case on 29 May 2017, had left Indonesia in April 2017 after being summoned for questioning and then stayed in Saudi Arabia for over three years.

In November 2020, Nikita Mirzani renewed her criticism of Rizieq Shihab, following his return to Indonesia after the criminal charges against him were dropped. On her Instagram live account, she said Rizieq, who uses the honorific Habib to signify he is a descendant of Muhammad, is a charlatan.

"What I know is that habib means tukang obat (medicine man). [Take a] screenshot [of me saying this]. Habib [Rizieq Shihab] is a charlatan, don’t glorify him. Prophet Muhammad, He’s clearly a prophet. While this human always makes trouble but he gets a [warm] welcome".

FPI supporter and cleric Maaher At-Thuwailibi responded by calling Nikita Mirzani a lonte (slut), a babi betina (sow) and threatened to spill blood in raiding her house if she failed to apologize within 24 hours. Police deployed officers to guard her house. Nikita Mirzani refused to apologize and instead offered to feed those who go to her house. She also challenged Rizieq Shihab to take a DNA test to prove his assertion that he is a descendant of Muhammad. Netizens praised her for her bold remarks. In the East Java capital of Surabaya, images of Nikita Mirzani were displayed as a symbol of resistance against Rizieq Shihab when residents protested against the FPI leader. Political analyst and lecturer Hendri Satrio also noted that Nikita Mirzani had become a resistance symbol. Nikita Mirzani said that since gaining viral popularity as a result of her post about Rizieq Shihab, she had reaped hundreds of millions of rupiah in endorsements.

=== Case against Dito Mahendra ===
In June 2022, Nikita Mirzani is charged with violations of Electronic Information and Transactions Law after calling Dito Mahendra, an Indonesian businessperson, a "giver of false hope" and a fraudster. Her iPad and her Instagram account has been seized by the police for investigation. On 21 July, she is arrested while shopping at Senayan City, a shopping mall in Jakarta. She was released later as the police considered humanitarian reason, as Nikita Mirzani had three children.

On 25 October 2022, Nikita Mirzani was arrested.

=== Gambling advertisement ===
I February 2024, an online gambling advertisement featuring artist Nikita Mirzani went viral on Twitter. The advertisement remained visible for several days but disappeared from the platform on 20 February 2024, the advertisement was no longer visible on Twitter. The advertisement made netizens furious when they saw Nikita Mirzani's online gambling advertisement. The ad is shared by the gambling game players, and posting the ad on Twitter. The ad is appearing in videos, and the ad is always appearing until the police intervened. The police conducted an investigation into online gambling advertisements which were allegedly promoted by Nikita Mirzani. The Ministry of Communication and Information (Kominfo) also summoned Twitter representatives to Indonesia to follow up on the advertisement.

== Filmography ==
=== Film ===
Year	Title	Role	Notes
2010	Lihat Boleh, Pegang Jangan		Debut film
2011	Perempuan-Perempuan Liar		
2012	Nenek Gayung	Dewi/Nenek Gayung	
2012	Mama Minta Pulsa	Komandan Carolina	
2012	Pacarku Kuntilanak Kembar	Rosa, Rosi	Played twins
2012	Tali Pocong Perawan 2	Janet	
2013	Pokun Roxy	Jupe	
2013	Pantai Selatan		
2013	Taman Lawang		
2014	Drakula Cinta		
2014	Comic 8		
2015	Comic 8: Casino Kings part 1		
2016	Jagoan Instan	Inem	
2016	Comic 8: Casino Kings part 2	Nikita	
2016	Moammar Emka's Jakarta Undercover	Sasha	
2016	Komedi Gokil 2	Shanty	
2016	Sang Sekretaris	Tiara	
2017	Si Juki The Movie	Bidadari (voice)	Animated film
2017	Otajin		
2017	Moammar Emka's Jakarta Undercover	Sasha	

=== TV soap operas ===
Year	Title	Role	Notes	Production house
2017	Jodoh Wasiat Bapak	Nella, Tasya		Tobali Putra Productions
2017	Malaikat Tak Bersayap	Indah	guest star	Verona Pictures
2017–2018	Warteg DKI	Indri		Verona Pictures
2019	Firasat	Anita, Intan	guest star	
2019	Jodoh Wasiat Bapak	Nyai Darsih		Tobali Putra Productions
2019	Menembus Mata Bathin The Series	Rini	guest star	Verona Pictures

=== Reality TV and talk shows ===
Year	Title	Notes	Broadcaster
2017	Bintang Pantura (Season 4)	Dangdut talent quest competition, host	Indosiar
2017	Stand Up Comedy Academy (Season 3)	Stand-up comedian talent quest show, host	Indosiar
2017–2018	Pagi Pagi Pasti Happy	Morning talk show, received a warning and suspension from the Indonesian Broadcasting Commission after Nikita interviewed a minor about his father's extra-marital affair. Nikita was in January 2018 reported to police for alleged defamation on the show.	Trans TV
2018	Penghuni Rumah Terakhir	Nikita featured as guest juror	GTV
2019	The Mask Singer Indonesia (Season 4)	Nikita appeared on episode 11	GTV
2019–2021	Nih Kita Kepo	Talk show	Trans TV
2020	Cemceman	Humorous talk show	Trans TV
2020	Brownis Jalan-Jalan	Talk show	Trans TV
2020 and 2021	Bikin Laper	Culinary show, guest host at 2020 and regular host at 2021	Trans TV
2020–2021	Yuk Sehat bersama dr. Oky Pratama	Health talk show, co-host	Trans TV
2021	Pansos (Panggung Sketsa Oh Seru)	Comedy show, regular cast	Trans TV
2021	D'Cafe	Comedy talkshow, guest host	Trans7

== Discography ==
=== Single ===
- Baby I Hate You (2012)
- Mau-Maunya (2013)
- Kode-Kodean (2016)
- Money and Love (OST. Moammar Emka's Jakarta Undercover) (2016)
- Selalu Salah (2020)
- Nikita Gang feat Young Lex (2021)
