= Dahsyat =

- Logo used from 2008 to 2010
- Genre: Music
- Starring: Raffi Ahmad; Denny Wahyudi; Ayu Dewi; Jessica Iskandar; Nagita Slavina; Dede Sunandar; Bastian Steel; Bisma Karisma; Anwar Sanjaya Pigano; Baim Wong; Syahnaz Sadiqah; Billy Syahputra; Dude Herlino; Kevin Julio; Chand Kelvin; Rina Nose; Felicya Angelista; Titi Kamal; Leo Consul; Salshabilla Adriani; Daniel Mananta; Mumuk; Sheryl Sheinafia; Ajun Perwira; Kiky Saputri; Syifa Hadju; Nabilah Ayu; Marcel Chandrawnata; Tiara Andini; Anrez Adelio; Claudia Andhara; Happy Asmara; Marshel Widianto; Celine Evangelista; Rizky Billar; Ruben Onsu; Tarra Budiman; Indra Herlambang; Halda Rianta; Ghea Youbi; Raden Rakha; Ummi Quary
- Country of origin: Indonesia

Production
- Executive producers: Yul B. Andryono (2008); John Fair Faune (2009); Untung Pranoto (2009–2010); Jahja Immanuel Riyanto (2011–2023); Saptono (2014–2023)
- Producers: John Fair Faune (2008); Jahja Immanuel Riyanto (2009–2010); Kristoforus Bagaskoro (2011); Armen Egun Basauli (2011–present); Endang Setyaningsih (2011–2014); Abrar (2014–2015); Rachmad Welly (2014–present); Agung Priyatno (2015–present)
- Running time: 120 minutes

Original release
- Network: RCTI; MNC Entertainment; MNC Music
- Release: 24 March 2008 – May 2026

Dahsyat (lit. transl. Strikes, also stylized as dahSyat) is an Indonesian television show broadcast daily on Rajawali Citra Televisi Indonesia (RCTI). The first episode of Dahsyat since 24 March 2008. The show broadcasts subject matter related to music, and each show is two hours long. It was initially presented by Olga Syahputra, Raffi Ahmad, and Luna Maya. Presenters have since included a variety of actors, directors, comedians, and musicians.

As evidence of its popularity, Indonesian TV audiences voted Dahsyat their Favorite Music & Variety Show in the Panasonic Awards for five consecutive years from 2010 to 2014 and 2016. In 2016, Dahsyat subsequently had winning for Most Popular Morning Program at the Indonesian Television Awards.

== Dahsyat presenters ==
The Dahsyat presenters have not been immune to controversy during the show's lengthy run.

In June 2010, Luna Maya left the show after video clips surfaced allegedly showing her taking part in sex acts with Ariel from the band, Peterpan (now known as Noah) and with Cut Tari.

Raffi Ahmad's house was raided by police looking for drugs, including marijuana and methylone in 2013. Indonesia's agency responsible for monitoring narcotics charged Ahmad with possession and distribution of category one narcotics; Ahmad spent three months in an outpatient drug rehabilitation clinic.

The Indonesian Broadcasting Commission (KPI) repeatedly reprimanded Olga Syahputra for coarse humor, which included references to male genitalia and jokes about transvestites, rape and, overweight people. He subsequently died in Singapore on March 27, 2015 of meningitis.

=== Fixed presenter ===
Host/presenter	Years on Air
Raffi Ahmad	2008-2013; 2013–present
Denny Wahyudi	2011–present
Ayu Dewi	2011-2017, present

=== Co-presenter ===
Host/presenter	Years on Air
Nagita Slavina	2014–present
Syahnaz Sadiqah	2013–present
Dede Sunandar	2014–present
Bastian Steel	2014–present
Mumuk Gomez	2014–present
Felicya Angelista	2015–present
Anwar Sanjaya Pigano	2015–present
Titi Kamal	2013–2018, 2020-present
Dina Marissa	2016–present
Vanessa Liyana	2013–2018, 2020-present

=== Former presenters ===
Host/presenter	Years on Air
Darius Sinathriya, Choky Sitohang	2008
Luna Maya	2008–2011; 2012–2014
Olga Syahputra	2008–2013; 2014
Okky Lukman, Tika Panggabean	2008–2009
Acha Septriasa, Astrid Tiar	2010
Boy William, Fanny Fabriana	2010–2011
Jono, Olla Ramlan	2010–2012
Tiffany Orie	2010–2011; 2013
Ade Namnung	2010–2012
Dude Herlino	2011
Ivan Gunawan, Kevin Julio	2011–2012
Jessica Iskandar, Ayu Ting Ting	2011–2013
Gisella Anastasia, Melaney Ricardo, Afiqah, Baharuddin	2012–2013
Mikha Tambayong, Zaskia Gotik, Ajun Perwira, Rina Nose, Chand Kelvin, Amel Carla, Albert Bebestar, Leo Consul	2013
Billy Syahputra, Putri Una, Pica Priscilla	2013–2014
Daniel Mananta, Cinta Laura, Sapri	2014
Lolita Agustine	2014–2015
Muhammad Irfhan	2012–2013; 2014–2016
Marcel Chandrawinata (Dahsyatnya School)	2011–2012; 2013–2016
Tina Toonita	2013–2016
Shania JKT48, Elly Sugigi, James Purba	2014–2016
Bisma Karisma, Kartika Putri, Chika Jessica, Thalia JKT48	2015
Sheryl Sheinafia	2016-2018

== Popularity ==
The daily Dahsyat show draws millions of viewers.

On 12 Dec 2014, the show had a TVR of 1.3 and a share of 12.7%, ranking it 62nd. On 14 Dec 2014, the show had a TVR of 2.0 and a share of 18.7%, ranking it 25th.

Dahsyat has made efforts to improve ratings. The show followed SCTV's Eat Bulaga! Indonesia's by offering prizes and instituted the new Gaspol format focused on dance events, similar to Trans TV's Yuk Keep Smile's Caesar Dance. However, the show's programming has been widely criticized by viewers for a decline in music, increased attention on the presenters' personal lives, long advertisements, and frequent presenter changes. These criticisms have been compounded by both the success of rival show Inbox on SCTV and incidents involving the presenters, notably Raffi Ahmad's drug charges and a reprimand by the Indonesian Broadcasting Commission for insulting Islam.

== New format ==
On August 27, 2013, Dahsyat launched the Gaspol dance event format, adding a DJ.

== Dahsyatnya Awards ==
Dahsyatnya Awards is an awards ceremony for Indonesian music, hosted by the Dahsyat presenters and airing on the same television station, RCTI. The show first was held on April 19, 2009. In 2015, the 2014 Dahsyatnya Awards show won the category "Best Special Event" at 2015 Panasonic Gobel Awards.

== Special guest stars ==
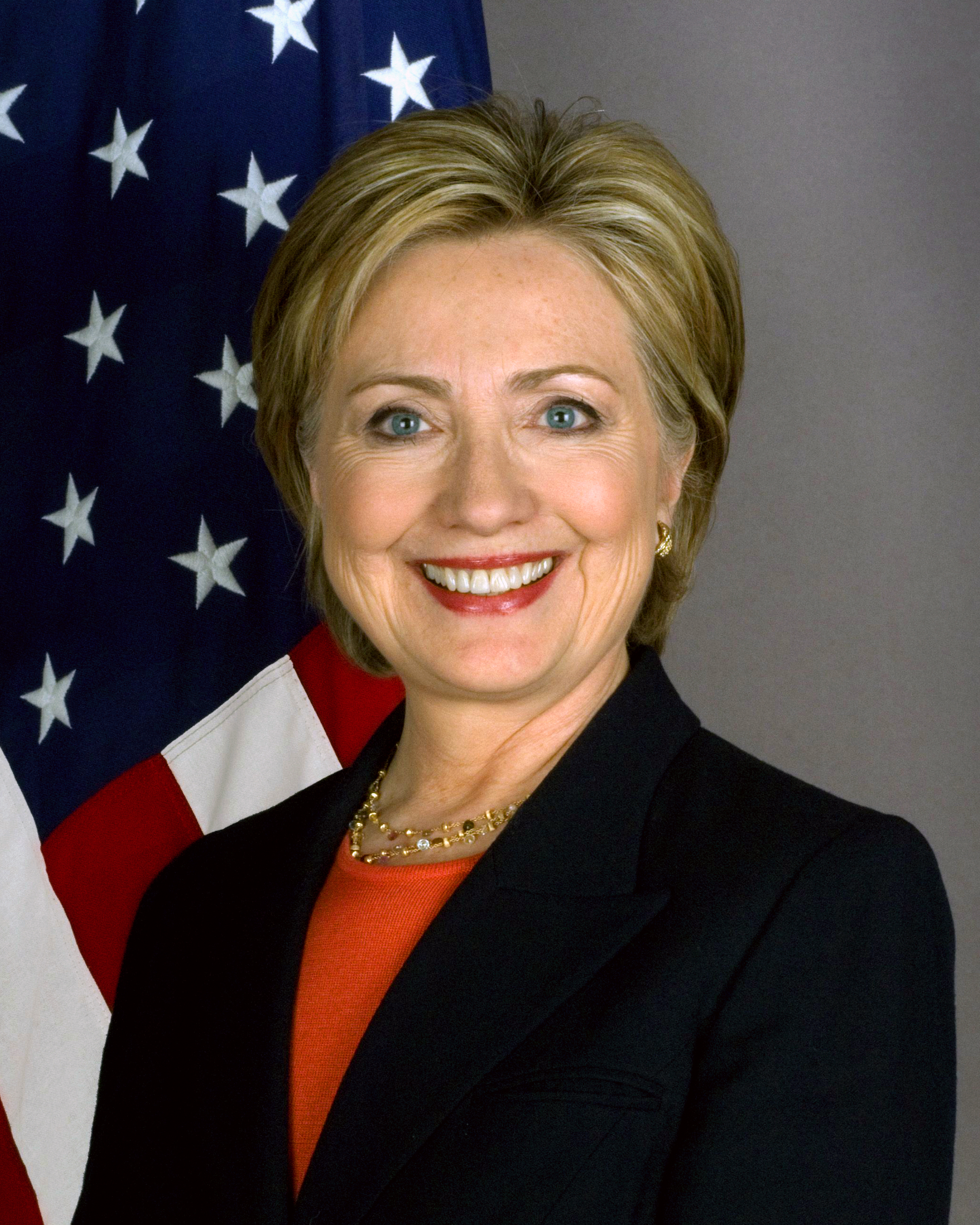
Hillary Clinton

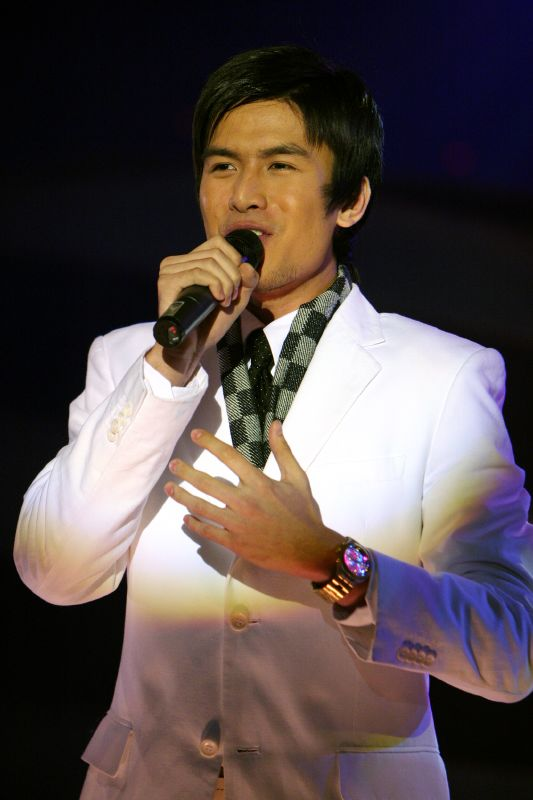
Christian Bautista

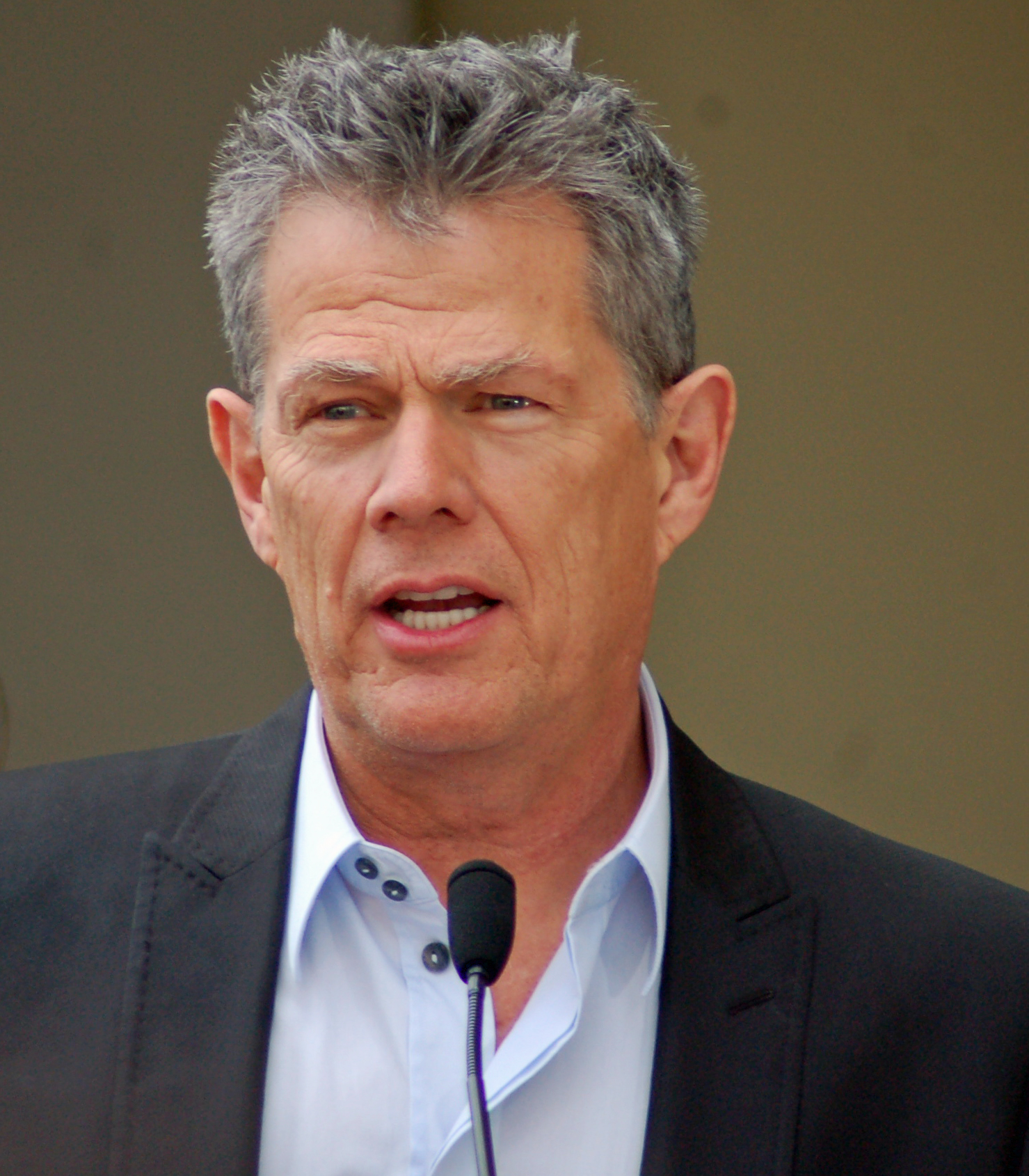
David Foster

Special guest stars have included politicians like Hillary Clinton - United States Secretary of State;. several Miss World winners including: Ksenia Sukhinova - Miss World 2008, Kaiane Aldorino - Miss World 2009, Alexandria Mills - Miss World 2010, Ivian Sarcos - Miss World 2011, Yu Wenxia - Miss World 2012, Megan Young - Miss World 2013 and Julia Morley the CEO of the Miss World Organization.

Musical guests have included: Anggun - Indonesia international Singer and Ambassador of FAO, finalist on Eurovision Song Contest 2012, Christian Bautista - Filipino international Singer, host and model, Siti Nurhaliza - Malaysian international Singer, McFly - English Pop Rock Band, Lee Ji-hoon - South Korean singer and actor, * David Foster - Canadian composer, Minami Takahashi - Japanese singer, Lee DeWyze a contestant on American Idol 2010, Depapepe - Japanese Acoustic Group, Fabrizio Faniello - Eurovision Song Contest 2001 and Eurovision Song Contest 2006 performer, Thia Megia a contestant on American Idol 2011, Destine - Dutch Rock Band, Han Geng a Chinese singer, AKB48 the Japanese Girl Group; Simple Plan the Canadian Rock Band, Secondhand Serenade an American Rock Band, and Daimaou Kosaka a Japanese recording artist.

Other musical guests have included: The American heavy metal band The Iron Maidens, Rick Price the Australian singer, Eru the Korean singer and actor, BtoB a Korean Boy Group, Filipino singer and actor Sam Concepcion, Justice Crew the Australian Boy Group, David Cook a contestant on American Idol 2008, Sinclarity an American Acoustic Group, Connie Talbot the English singer, Scandal the Japanese Rock Band, Dutch Rock Band Kensington, Eir Aoi the Japanese singer, Irish singer Shane Filan, Tommy Page an American singer, Korean Pop Grou Lunafly, Wouter Hamel a Dutch singer, and Danish rock band Carpark North.

Footballer guests have included: Franco Baresi and Paolo Maldini (Italy), Ray Wilkins, Anton Ferdinand, David May and John Barnes (England), Jesper Blomqvist (Sweden), Fernando Morientes and Roberto Soldado (Spain), Edwin van der Sar (the Netherlands) Adlène Guedioura (Algeria), Andriy Shevchenko (Ukraine), Jonas Gonçalves Oliveira and Roque Junior (Brazil), Robert Pires (France) and Luís Figo (Portugal).

Other guests from varied backgrounds have included: Moymoy Palaboy a comedian lipsync duo from the Philippines, Paul O'Brien the Australian actor, Horace Grant and Rafer Alston American basketball players, Samantha Jade from The X Factor Australia 2012, and World motivational speaker Nick Vujicic.

== Awards and nominations ==
Year	Award	Category	Recipients	Results
2010	Panasonic Gobel Awards 2010	Favorite Music/Variety Show Program	Dahsyat	Won
2011	Panasonic Gobel Awards 2011	Favorite Music/Variety Show Program	Dahsyat	Won
2012	Panasonic Gobel Awards 2012	Favorite Music/Variety Show Program	Dahsyat	Won
2013	Panasonic Gobel Awards 2013	Favorite Music/Variety Show Program	Dahsyat	Won
2014	Panasonic Gobel Awards 2014	Favorite Music/Variety Show Program	Dahsyat	Won
2015	Panasonic Gobel Awards 2015	Favorite Special Events	2014 Dahsyatnya Awards	Won
2016	Indonesian Television Awards 2016	Most Popular Morning Program	Dahsyat	Won
2016	Panasonic Gobel Awards 2016	Favorite Music/Variety Show Program	Dahsyat	Won
2017	Indonesian Television Awards 2017	Most Popular Morning Program	Dahsyat	Won
2017	Panasonic Gobel Awards 2017	Favorite Music/Variety Show Program	Dahsyat	Won

== See also ==
- RCTI
- 2011 Panasonic Gobel Awards
- Variety Show
