= Opera Van Java =

Indonesian comedy show

- Creative directors: Kenita Sle Anggraini; Jeffry Yuniar Priastono; Fori Desniar; Febri Setiawan
- Starring: Parto Patrio (2008–2021); Andre Taulany (2008–2013); Sule (2008–2013); Azis Gagap (2008–2020); Nunung (2008–2014); Rina Nose (2008, 2018); Wendy Cagur (2009–2012, 2017); Denny Cagur (2016–2021); Gilang Dirga (2016); Ayya Renita (2016); Uus (2016–2017); Ferdians Setiadi (2017–2021); Andhika Pratama (2017–2018); Raffi Ahmad (2021); Anwar Sanjaya (2020–2021); Mpok Alpa (2020–2021); Billy Syahputra (2020–2021); Jolene Marie Rotinsulu (2020)
- Country of origin: Indonesia
- Original language: Indonesian
- No. of seasons: 9
- No. of episodes: 1335

Production
- Executive producer: Sambodo
- Producer: Yustina Pramita
- Production locations: Trans7 studio, Jakarta
- Running time: 90 minutes

Original release
- Network: Trans7
- Release: 12 December 2008 – 10 December 2021

Opera Van Java (abbreviated as OVJ) is an improvisation comedy show broadcast on the Indonesian TV station Trans7. The show's concept is of wayang orang performances in a modern setting. As such, all positions are referred as wayang.

The sketches are varied. They may be adapted from Indonesian folklore, biographies of famous persons, fiction, mystery stories, foreign stories, or popular culture.

The name Opera Van Java likely comes as a parody of nickname of several places in Java by the Dutch during Indonesia's colonial times (i.e. Parijs van Java (Paris of Java) for Bandung), hence the name means Opera of Java.

On 15 August 2016, Opera Van Java was revived with the new stars.

== Special shows ==
=== Sahurnya OVJ ===
Sahurnya OVJ was a special Ramadan edition of Opera Van Java which began airing in 2009. It was broadcast at dawn, coinciding with suhur.

=== Panas Dingin Awards ===
Starting in 2011, OVJ appeared in different designs, namely Panas DIngin Awards. It is served as the parody of Panasonic Gobel Awards. The reason of this parody is the Trans Corp (the sole owner of Trans7) have felt cheated by MNC (owner of RCTI, the official broadcaster of the real awards for many consecutive years) because it was considered not fair in determining the winners.

=== Opera Van Java Awards ===
Beginning on 11 June 2011, OVJ began holding the Opera Van Java Awards, an annual appreciation night for the guest stars who had appeared on Opera Van Java.

=== OVJ Roadshow ===
Since 2010, OVJ has held shows in many cities in Indonesia, usually broadcast as OVJ Roadshow. The roadshow is held twice on Saturdays: in the afternoon (recorded for later airing) and at night (live).

=== Copa Van Indonesia ===
Copa Van Indonesia
- Founded: 2010 (in 2010 Piala Indonesia season)
- Country: Indonesia
- Number of clubs: See List of football clubs in Indonesia
- Current champions: Sriwijaya FC (2010); Persibo Bojonegoro (2012)
- Current: 2nd Copa Van Indonesia 2012

After the successful of the Copa Indonesia football competition in 2009, in 2010, OVJ appeared in a format which mixed football with comedy in the first time, the Copa Van Indonesia. It was based on the Copa Indonesia, and held every 2 years after the Copa Indonesia season. And, in 2011, OVJ is held the next football competition, but in annual, is OVJ Cup. Also same as Piala Indonesia.

=== Opera Van Java Cup a.k.a. Copa Van Java ===
OVJ Cup
- Founded: 2011
- Country: Indonesia
- Number of clubs: See List of football clubs in Indonesia
- Current champions: Arema Indonesia (2011); Persija Jakarta (2012)
- Current: OVJ Cup 2012

From 11 June to 11 July 2011, as well as 7 July to 7 August 2012, OVJ appeared in a format which mixed football with comedy. It was based on the Indonesian Cup.

==== OVJ Cup Champions ====
Date	Location	Winners	Score	Runner-up
11 July 2011	Kanjuruhan Stadium, Malang	Arema Indonesia	2–0	Sriwijaya FC
7 August 2012	Bung Karno Stadium, Jakarta	Persija Jakarta	5–0	Persib Bandung

== Achievements ==
- Panasonic Gobel Awards 2010: Favorite comedy/humour category.
- Panasonic Gobel Awards 2011: Favorite comedy/humour category.
- Panasonic Gobel Awards 2012: Nominated favorite comedy/humour category.
- Panasonic Gobel Awards 2013: Nominated favorite comedy/humour category.

== Sponsorships ==
- Luwak White Koffie
- Sasa
- Thermolyte Plus
- Viostin DS
- Krating Daeng
- Antangin JRG
- Kuku Bima EnerG
- Beng Beng
- Teh Gelas
- Cooling 5
- Sarimi Isi 2
- Tolak Angin
- Samsung Galaxy
- Verizon
- Djarum
