= Topik Petang (TV program) =

- Genre: News program
- Presented by: Limystina Novatra; Melisa Gandasari; Tika Ghaffar; Deba Depari; Aprilia Yahya; Arif Kurniawan; Ziza Hamzah
- Country of origin: Indonesia
- Original language: Indonesian

Production
- Producer: antv
- Production location: Jakarta
- Camera setup: Multi-camera
- Running time: 30 minutes

Original release
- Network: antv
- Release: April 30, 2006 – December 31, 2024

Topik Petang is an Indonesian television news program, which was broadcast Monday to Friday at 18:30, Saturday and Sunday at 17:30, on antv. It debuted on April 30, 2006. The program was broadcast at different times on antv if the broadcast of a sporting event interferes with the program's usual scheduling. Topik Petang last aired on December 31, 2024.
