= Okky Lukman =

Indonesian female actor

- Born: Okky Ayudhia Lukman; August 25, 1984 (age 41); Jakarta, Indonesia
- Other name: Okky Lukman
- Occupations: Actress; Comedian; Presenter
- Years active: 1993 - present
- Parent(s): Muhammad A. Lukman (father); Zukaida (mother)
- Website: Okky Lukman Profile Website

Okky Ayudhia Lukman or better known as Okky Lukman (born in Jakarta, Indonesia on August 25, 1984) is an Indonesian actress, comedian and presenter of Minangkabau descent.

== Career ==
Okky became known after starring in Lenong Bocah from 1993-1998. Her chubby appearance, chatty conversational style and original way of speaking immediately attracted the attention of viewers. Prior to joining Lenong Boy, she appeared in several soap operas including, Okky in "TVRI". Aditya Gumay, leader Ananda Studio and Lenong boy, who saw great talent within Oki. From there anyway Oki then involved in staging "Lenong Boy" broadcast on a television station. Oki now also venturing into the world of soap operas and television host.

== Television ==
- Lenong Bocah
- Jinny Oh Jinny
- Wah Cantiknya
- Norak Tapi Beken
- Annie Van Jogja
- Funtastik
- Ketok Pintu
- Dangdut Mania
- Kring Kring Olala
- New Prime Time
- Cucu (Cuplikan Lucu)
- Idola Cilik 1-3
- Dahsyat
- Pacar Pertama
- Derings
- Tarung Dangdut
- Pagi Pagi Bagi Bagi
- Kontes Dangdut Indonesia 2014
- D'Academy 4
- Ceplas Ceplos
- Lenong Rempong
- Happy Show
- Improvisasi Selebriti
- Mari Kita Sahur
- Keluarga Gunarso
- Mikrofon Pelunas Utang
- The OK! Show
- Kilau DMD
- E-Talkshow
- I Can See Your Voice Indonesia 5
- The Voice Kids Indonesia 4
- Mikrofon Impian
- Arisan
- The New Eat Bulaga! Indonesia
- Kangen Joget
- For Your Pagi
- Kampung Rasa

== Commercials ==
- KFC (1997)
- Coca-Cola (1999)
- Tropicool (1999)
- Trenz (2000)
- Citra Body Lotion (2000)
- Pizza Hut (2001)
- Indomie (2001), With Chairul Tanjung and Jovanka Mardova
- Esia (2007)
- Okky Jelly Drink (2009)
- Pamol (2010)
- Motor Suzuki (2008)

== Awards and nominations ==
Year	Award	Nominated work	Result
2006	Panasonic Awards 2006	Host favorite reality	Won
2010	Panasonic Gobel Awards 2010	Talent show favorite presenter	Won
2011	Festival Indonesia Television (Festival Sinetron Indonesia)	Best Female Main Cast	Won
