= Topik (TV program) =

Indonesian television program

- Genre: News program
- Country of origin: Indonesia
- Original language: Indonesian

Production
- Production location: Jakarta
- Running time: 60 minutes (Topik Pagi); 60 minutes (Topik Siang & Topik Malam)

Original release
- Network: ANTV
- Release: April 30, 2006 – December 31, 2024

Related
- Kabar; Cakrawala; Merah Putih Peristiwa

Topik (Topic) is a flagship television newscast broadcast on the Indonesian TV network ANTV. Its slogan is "Lebih Cepat, Lebih Dalam, Lebih Lengkap" ("Faster, Deeper, More Complete").

== History ==
Previously, antv had some flagship news program:

- Laporan ANteve (ANteve Reports), airs on 1 March 1993 – 15 October 1995.
- Cakrawala Sore (Afternoon Horizon), airs on 16 October 1995 – April 29, 2006 as the evening news program. Later, the name is used to the newsmagazine program.
- Jurnal ANTV (ANTV Journal), airs on 4 August 2003 – 29 April 2006.

As the 20% stake of the network bought by STAR TV (part of News Corporation) in October 2005, on 1 May 2006 after the transition, the newscasts were renamed to Topik.

== Showtimes list ==
=== Topik Terkini ===
- Everyday, Two Times A Day

=== Topik Breaking News ===
- Everyday, Rarely

== Programs ==
As of April 2018 until January 2023, currently ANTV broadcasts only one newscast, Topik Terkini a news update program which is aired every several hours.

In some cases, such as during Indonesian Super League or Indonesian Second Division broadcasts, Topik Petang broadcasts as Topik Petang Update, covering summary of national news on 5:30 p.m. in 5 minutes.

Topik Pagi and Topik Siang were antv's regular news programs; during weekends the programs covers light news, such as lifestyle and travelling, with "Weekend" added to the show's name.

Previously, it had a news talk program called Topik Kita (Our Topic). Later, the program changed its format to the newsmagazine program, and then replaced with a late-afternoon news program named Cakrawala, using the name of their previous news programming.

On 31 December 2024, Topik Petang was ended, followed by Topik Siang in 31 December 2024, and Topik Malam on 31 December 2024. By 31 December 2024, only Topik Pagi and Topik Terkini remained as their news programs under the Topik banner. ANTV would briefly air another nightly news program called Selamat Malam Indonesia between 1 November 2015 to 31 December 2024, before it moved timeslots that turned it into Selamat Pagi Nusantara.

On 31 December 2024, after running for 11 years, ANTV cancelled their morning newscasts, Topik Pagi and Selamat Pagi Nusantara. This marked the end of most ANTV newscasts as it turned into its genre to an entertainment television station. Topik Terkini and Selamat Pagi Nusantara returned on 15 January 2018, with the latter ending broadcast on 31 December 2018, leaving the short news program Topik Terkini as their sole news programming until its cessation on late 31 December 2024.
