= Taman Lawang =

- Theatrical release poster
- Directed by: Aditya Gumay
- Produced by: Olga Syahputra
- Starring: Olga Syahputra; Nikita Mirzani; Ferry Irawan; Angie; Bobby Tience; Tarra Budiman; Chand Kelvin; Jony Billy
- Distributed by: Wasita Film
- Release date: November 7, 2013
- Running time: 90 minutes
- Country: Indonesia
- Language: Indonesian

Taman Lawang (lit. Lawang Park) is an Indonesian comedy-horror movie about transvestites in Lawang Park who are forced to prostitute to make ends meet. The film was released on 7 November 2013, starring Olga Syahputra and Nikita Mirzani. The film was directed by Aditya Gumai with Asye Berti Saulina as its executive producer.

Chand Kelvin was one of the actors who portrayed a transvestite in the movie. He wanted to show the other side of a transvestite: "It's a new experience, being a transvestite. However, that's just acting. Usually there is a judgment among the community that transvestites are scums of society. Only the movie 'Lawang Park' shows a different angle, namely how difficult it is to earn money. So I thought, transvestites should not be looked down upon".

== Plot ==
The story is of a reliable young journalist named Angie (Angie Virgin) who is challenged to investigate mysterious events in Lawang Park. The event begins with the death of a transvestite, named Ningrum (Bobby Tience). Ningrum was killed while trying to escape a raid. He fled with his best friend, Cynthia (Olga Syahputra). After Ningrum's death, Cynthia began to experience strange events and occurrences and becomes a terror victim.

Cynthia feels Ningrum is angry because he could not help her when she falls into a river, and in the end, she dies. Reportedly, the figures of Ningrum and Cynthia often wander, and Angie continues to be haunted by their ghosts.

== Cast ==
- Olga Syahputra as well as the protagonist named Cynthia and Producer.
- Nikita Mirzani
- Bobby Tience
- Ferry Irawan
- Angie Virgin
- Tarra Budiman
- Chand Kelvin
- Jony Billy
- Trans women of Lawang Park as cameo.
