= Atas Nama Cinta =

Indonesian romantic drama television series

- Genre: Drama; Romance
- Created by: Ferry Fernandez
- Written by: Team Tobali
- Directed by: Wicik Widiyansyah
- Starring: Jonas Rivanno; Sarah Samantha; Donny Michael; Daniel Rutters; Rina Hasyim; Joy Octaviano; Ilima Njo; Aura Nabilla Izzathi; David Hoffman; Puspita Sarry; Intan Melodi; Elizabeth Christine; Marchia Pohan
- Opening theme: "Atas Nama Cinta" by Rossa
- Ending theme: "Atas Nama Cinta" by Rossa
- Composer: Matthews Siahaan
- Country of origin: Indonesia
- Original language: Indonesian
- No. of seasons: 1
- No. of episodes: 25

Production
- Executive producer: Utojo Sutjiutama
- Producer: Ferry Fernandez
- Production locations: Jakarta, Indonesia
- Production company: Tobali Putra Production

Original release
- Network: ANTV
- Release: 5 June – 2 July 2023

Atas Nama Cinta is an Indonesian television romantic drama series that premiered on 5 June 2023 on ANTV. It starred Jonas Rivanno, Sarah Samantha, Donny Michael and Daniel Rutters in the lead role. The show went off air on 2 July 2023 due to low ratings.

== Plot ==
Indah who quarrels with her boss, Raynar, a handsome young man and owner of a luxury hotel is wealthy and arrogant in nature.

Widuri, Grandma of Raynar, was accidentally helped by Indah and saw the sincerity of Indah. Widuri also asked Indah to be Raynar's personal assistant.

The fight between Raynar and Indah annoyed Raynar, but he couldn't refuse at her grandmother's request and was forced to accept Indah as her personal assistant.

Unbeknownst to Raynar, Indah uses this opportunity as a disguise to investigate Raynar's involvement in the death of her older sister, Anggia, at Raynar's hotel.

On the other hand, Emir, Indah's best friend who secretly has a crush on Indah, supports this decision for other reasons. As time goes by, Indah is in a dilemma choosing between love or continuing her revenge.

Will Indah's disguise bear fruit and how will Indah's relationship with Raynar continue?

== Cast ==
=== Main ===
- Jonas Rivanno as Raynar Giorgino Adhitama: Adnan's son; Nindy's brother.
- Sarah Samantha as Indah Adiarani: Laras' daughter; Anggia's sister.
- Donny Michael as Emir Alvaro: Indah's best friend.

=== Recurring ===
- Joy Octaviano as Dion Mahardika Adhitama: Billy and Diana's son; Raynar and Nindy's cousin.
- Daniel Rutters as Dimas Aditia: Emir's cousin.
- Ilima Njo as Nindy Anidhita Adhitama: Adnan's daughter; Raynar's sister. (Dead)
- Aura Nabilla Izzathi as Sofia: Tanti's daughter.
- David Hoffman as Billy Pratama: Widuri's son; Diana's wife; Dion's father; Raynar and Nindy's uncle.
- Puspita Sarry as Diana Shinta: Billy's husband; Dion's mother; Raynar and Nindy's aunt.
- Intan Melodi as Aira Sulistiani: Indah's best friend.
- Rina Hasyim as Widuri: Billy's mother; Raynar, Nindy and Dion's grandma.
- Elizabeth Christine as Laras Pertiwi: Indah and Anggia's mother.
- Marchia Pohan as Tanti: Sofia's mother.
- Unknown as El: Dimas' friend.
- Unknown as Mario: Dimas' friend.
- Unknown as Surti: Adhitama's maid.
- Unknown as Samsul: Adhitama's driver.

== Production ==
=== Development and released ===
The series was scheduled to be released on 29 May 2023 but got delayed and finally released on 5 June 2023.

=== Casting ===
Jonas Rivanno was selected to portray Raynar. Sarah Samantha played the role of Indah. Ilima Njo and Daniel Rutters were cast as Nindy and Dimas.
