= Julia Perez =

Indonesian actress and singer (1980–2017)

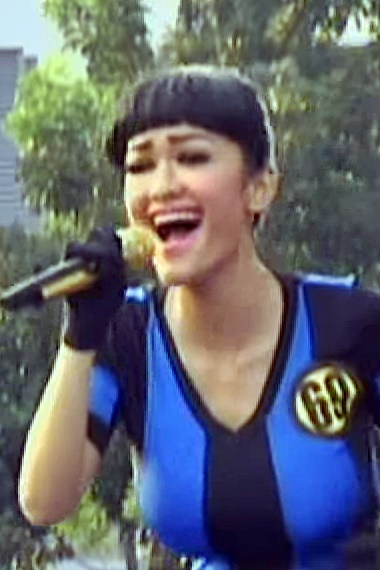
- Julia Perez in 2014
- Born: Yuli Rachmawati; 15 July 1980; Jakarta, Indonesia
- Died: 10 June 2017 (aged 36); Jakarta, Indonesia
- Other name: Jupe
- Education: Faculty of Law, Bung Karno University
- Occupations: Celebrity, singer, model
- Years active: 1997–2017
- Spouses: Damien Perez (m. 2002; div. 2010) Gastón Castaño (m. 2013; div. 2016)

Yuli Rachmawati (15 July 1980 – 10 June 2017), better known as Julia Perez, abbreviated as Jupe, was an Indonesian singer, model, and actress. In the early 2010s, she became known for her outspoken statements against conservative Muslim clerics, who deemed her as too erotic for Indonesian audiences.

== Early life ==
Julia Perez was born Yuli Rachmawati in on 15 July 1980 in Jakarta, Indonesia, as the eldest daughter to Sri Wulansih (b. 25 May 1963) and Angkasa Djaya (7 August 1961 – 2 December 2013). Her father played football for a club in Bandar Lampung city, and her mother, who played women's football for Caprina Cijantung Club in Jakarta She was of mixed Sunda and Betawi ancestry. Her parents divorced some time around 1988, when Julia Perez was still a child. Her mother had to take on odd jobs to support the family. Her mother later married Sakib ‘Sammy’ Mahri, who owns a welding business and rental properties.

After leaving high school, Julia Perez studied at InterStudi Secretarial Academy in Jakarta, at the behest of an older female friend, who also paid for her tuition and advised her to find a bule (white foreigner) boyfriend. She then worked for a furniture company run by a Dutchman. She began dating the owner's son, who invited her to work in the Netherlands. She accepted the offer and spent three years in the Netherlands, studying Dutch and working as a secretary.

On a holiday to Spain, she met French model Damien Perez. They were married in France on 7 October 2002. They had no children. Jupe said she was putting her career before starting a family. She suffered a miscarriage in 2007. In 2009, she became close to an Argentine soccer player, Gaston Castaño, who then played for Indonesian club Persiba Balikpapan and went on to play for several other Indonesian clubs. In 2010, Julia and Damien were divorced. She blamed the failure of their marriage on Damien's alleged womanizing.

In 2013, Julia and Gaston announced their engagement. They were quietly married in Sydney, Australia, on 26 September 2013. Their wedding was kept a virtual secret from Indonesia's media. Julia's mother had opposed the idea of her daughter marrying a football player. On 12 May 2016, South Jakarta District Court granted Julia a divorce and awarded her alimony of Rp15 million per month.

Julia's biological father, Angkasa Jaya, was arrested in 2012 for alleged possession of drugs. He died in December 2013.

In 2015, Julia Perez earned her Sarjana Hukum (Bachelor of Law) from Universitas Bung Karno.

== Career ==
After starting out as a secretary in Jakarta, Julia Perez moved to the Netherlands for further secretarial work. Her ensuing relationship with Damien Perez opened doors for her to model for FHM and Maxim magazines in France. Following her layouts in FHM and Maxim, Jupe was nominated as one of the 100 Sexiest Women in the World.

Around 2002, she returned to Indonesia for a holiday to help her younger sister attend a casting session for a soap opera, but the director ended up recruiting Julia Perez, who embarked upon an acting career. She appeared in late-night ribald comedy shows, with titles such as Komedi Nakal (Naughty Comedy). She gained further exposure and popularity by starring as a lifeguard dressed in a red swimsuit in an unofficial Indonesian version of Baywatch called Penjaga Pantai (Beach Guards).

She went on to appear in local soap operas, variety shows and horror movies, and also became a popular dangdut singer. Her debut album Kamasutra, released in 2008, included a free condom, which upset conservative Islamic organizations and resulted in her being banned from performing in several cities. In 2008, she was banned from performing at a concert commemorating Indonesia's 17 August Independence Day at a red-light area in Pekanbaru, Riau province.

In 2012, Julia Perez launched a chicken fast-food chain called Jupe Fried Chicken (JFC).

== Politics ==
In March 2010, Julia Perez told the press that eight political parties had asked her to run for the position of Regent of Pacitan regency in East Java province, even though she had never visited Pacitan. She said the parties courting her for the December 2010 local election included the People's Conscience Party (Hanura), the Great Indonesia Movement Party (Gerindra) and the National Mandate Party (PAN). Her candidacy led to accusations that political parties were putting personalities before policies and experience, whereas her supporters countered that her inexperience in political corruption and her opposition to conservative Islam made her a worthy candidate. In August 2010, Julia Perez announced she had pulled out of the election, saying it was her own decision.

In the run-up to Indonesia's 2014 presidential election, contested between populist Joko 'Jokowi' Widodo and former general Prabowo Subianto, Jupe publicly offered to marry Prabowo Subianto, who had never remarried since divorcing former president Suharto's second daughter, Titiek Suharto. Julia Perez tweeted on 19 May 2014: "Dear Mr Prabowo Subianto, Jupe is ready for a marriage proposal whenever you want.. You want to be president [and] need a wife, Jupe is ready sir." Prabowo Subianto responded on Twitter by thanking Julia Perez for her support. Julia Perez later said her offer did not mean that she supported Prabowo's presidential bid as she was neutral. On 5 June 2014, Jupe said she had decided to support Jokowi because Prabowo Subianto had broken her heart as he already had a girlfriend.

Ahead of Jakarta's 2017 gubernatorial election, Jupe voiced support for the incumbent, Basuki Tjahaja Purnama, better known as Ahok, who ended up losing the election and was then jailed for blasphemy against Islam. Jupe had initially considered Ahok to be fierce and creepy, but upon meeting him in March 2016 she declared him to be warm and friendly. She praised his urban planning and efforts to combat Jakarta's notorious floods and traffic. She also lauded his honesty, saying it was very difficult to find honest leaders in Indonesia.

== Other activities ==
In 2006, Julia Perez became an ambassador for the All Indonesia Chess Association (PERCASI), which held the "Julia Perez Rapid Chess Open Tournament" in Jakarta on 5 October 2006.

In 2010, Julia Perez founded the Champions Soccer School (CSS) in Jakarta, with the aim of improving the football prowess of Indonesian children by providing "Latin American-style" training from Argentine and Chilean coaches. She said CSS was not intended to be a money-making operation, but was inspired by her love of football. She fondly recalled playing football as a child with her parents and siblings in Cijantung, East Jakarta. CSS was based in Kuningan, South Jakarta, and subsequently opened coaching clinics at Bung Karno Stadium and in Simprug, South Jakarta. The school's first batch of 14 participants received free training. Subsequent participants, who had an average age of 10 to 13 years, were required to pay a Rp 1 million registration fee, plus an additional Rp 1 million for a 10-week course. Former participants recall Jupe often monitoring the training, encouraging them to exercise and sharing her passion for the game.

Julia Perez served as manager of Indonesia's Team Garuda at the 21st President's Cup International Amateur Boxing Tournament held in Jakarta over 3–9 July 2011. Jupe said her presence fired up the team's performance. She was also enthusiastic about the team, commenting: "The other day, I wanted to see the boxers being weighed. When I went in the room, why are they all naked? Apparently, one has to strip to be weighed. What can I say, that's my luck."

== One million followers ==
On 7 August 2012, Julia Perez performed a pole dance at a traffic light in Kuningan, Central Jakarta, to fulfil a promise she had made when she reached one million Twitter followers. Despite it being Ramadan, the Muslim fasting month, her outfit was not overly revealing, although she did display some cleavage.

== Controversies ==
=== Accusation by MUI ===
The Indonesian Ulama Council (MUI), Indonesia's top Muslim authority, in October 2011 accused Julia Perez of being a pornographic actress. Rather than start wearing a Muslim headscarf, she responded by demanding a meeting with MUI and challenged the clerics to show any evidence of pornography. She also jokingly apologized for being sexually attractive.

=== Physical clash and jail ===
On 11 October 2011, East Jakarta District Court sentenced Julia Perez to three months in jail with six months probation for assaulting Dewi Persik during a cat-fight on the set of the horror film Arwah Goyang Karawang (The Dancing Spirit of Karawang). Julia Perez filed an appeal to the Supreme Court, which rejected the appeal and annulled her probation period. She was ordered to begin serving her sentence on 14 February 2013, but she disappeared. On 18 March 2013, officers forcibly removed her from her house and took her to Pondok Bambu women's penitentiary in East Jakarta. She was released on 17 June 2013, after which she distributed qurans at seven mosques.

=== Perez name ===
In August 2013, Julia Perez told the press she should pay Rp1 billion ($95,200) per year, if she still wanted to use the Perez name after her divorce from Damien Perez. She said she would change her name, but she remained known as Julia Perez.

=== Censorship ===
In January 2012, the Indonesian Broadcasting Commission (KPI) sent an official warning letter to commercial television network ANTV over 28 December 2011 broadcast of talk-show Tri Angels, which featured a close-up of co-host Julia Perez's cleavage and a discussion about sex. KPI warned the network not to produce any more content of "excessive sexual exploitation".

In February 2012, Julia's song Jupe Paling Suka 69 (Jupe Likes 69 Best) was among 10 dangdut songs banned by the West Nusa Tenggara Regional Broadcasting Commission (KPID) from radio and television airplay on the grounds of having sexually explicit lyrics. In 2016, the same song was banned by West Java's KPID. Banten province in western Java also banned the song in 2016.

=== Condom ambassador ===
In 2013, Julia Perez was named ambassador for Indonesia's National Condom Week, an event aimed at raising awareness for the prevention of HIV/AIDS. The event was canceled after conservative Islamic groups claimed it promoted promiscuity.

=== Relationship with FPI ===
In December 2010, the Islamic Defenders Front (FPI) threatened to report female celebrities to police over "vulgar" online photos. Jupe said she would not make any drastic changes to her appearance as she wanted to remain sensual. FPI then praised Jupe for promising to improve her appearance.

In December 2011, FPI members in the West Java capital of Bandung branded Julia Perez a "temptress" and demanded she be banned from performing in the city.

Julia's spiritual adviser was Habib Selon (real name: Salim Al Athas, 1969 – 2015), who was head of the Jakarta chapter of FPI. When deadly floods hit Jakarta in mid-January 2013, Julia Perez accompanied Selon on a visit to the inundated neighborhood of Kampung Bukit Duri to hand out food and water aid. Some Muslims later criticized Selon because Julia Perez had been wearing a figure-hugging T-shirt, where as Selon and the FPI had in 2012 successfully campaigned to have Lady Gaga banned from performing in Jakarta because of her "indecent" clothes. Julia Perez had in 2012 urged Lady Gaga to ignore the ban, tweeting: "Dear mother @ladygaga please come to JKT! I dont care if they will hurt me with bamboo or weapons! My blood is ur blood..please come i beg u *ban down*." She said she had personally made a bra from the thorny durian fruit as a gift for Lady Gaga.

After Selon died of a heart attack in 2015, Jupe said he was like an older brother to her, and often gave her advice. She said they had planned to perform an umroh (minor haj pilgrimage) together in February 2016. She had also asked him to act as her guardian in the event she were to primary.

== Illness and death ==
In early October 2014, Julia Perez announced she had visited Singapore to consider her options for having a baby via sperm donation (a prohibited procedure in Indonesia). There was speculation at the time that she was suffering cancer and wanted to have a baby before the cancer advanced. Later that same month, Julia Perez revealed that seven months previously (around March 2014) she had been diagnosed with Stage 2a cervical cancer. She later clarified the cancer had been identified at Stage 1b. In Singapore, she underwent chemotherapy, radiation treatment and ovarian removal. In January 2015, she announced she was looking forward to returning to showbiz work, declaring she had completely recovered from the cancer. In April 2016, she appeared publicly with her head shaved, saying it was an act of support for cancer sufferers, especially women. Despite her treatment, the cancer spread and by December 2016 had reached Stage 4. In 2017, Julia Perez was being treated in Jakarta's Cipto Mangunkusumo Hospital. She had become reliant on donations from friends and supporters to cover her heavy medical bills for chemotherapy and other treatment. Among those helping to pay her bills was Basuki Tjahaja Purnama, better known as Ahok, who had served as Jakarta governor. During Ahok's last visit to Julia Perez in April 2017, he said she should not worry about paying her bills.

It was announced on 10 June 2017 that Julia Perez had died of Stage 4 cervical cancer.

== Filmography ==
=== Film ===
| Year | Title | Role | Notes |
|---|---|---|---|
| 2007 | Nagabonar Jadi 2 | Sexy Woman | Debut film |
| 2007 | Coklat Stroberi | Casting Girl No. 2 | Cameo appearance |
| 2007 | Beranak Dalam Kubur | Jasmine | |
| 2008 | Susahnya Jadi Perawan | Julia | |
| 2008 | Basahhh... | Juve | |
| 2008 | The Shaman | Nasha | |
| 2009 | Hantu Jamu Gendong | Sri | |
| 2009 | Sumpah, (Ini) Pocong! | Nani | |
| 2009 | Kuntilanak Kamar Mayat | Sarah | |
| 2009 | Bukan Cinta Biasa | Angel | |
| 2009 | Mau Dong... Ah! | Jupe | |
| 2009 | Jeritan Kuntilanak | Yunita | |
| 2009 | The City of Your Final Destination | Nurse | American film Cameo appearance |
| 2010 | Sst ... Jadikan Aku Simpanan | Tisya La Fontaine | |
| 2010 | Te(Rekam) | Jupe | |
| 2010 | Istri Bo'ongan | Amara | |
| 2011 | Arwah Goyang Jupe-Depe | Lilis/Laila | a.k.a. Arwah Goyang Karawang (causing residents unrest by using Karawang) |
| 2011 | Kuntilanak Kesurupan | | Cameo appearance |
| 2011 | Pocong Minta Kawin | Yuli Gaga | |
| 2012 | Rumah Bekas Kuburan | Karina | |
| 2012 | Bangkit Dari Kubur | | Cameo appearance |
| 2012 | Kutukan Arwah Santet | Kirana | |
| 2013 | Gending Sriwijaya | Malini | Won – Royal Bali Film Festival for Best Film Actress; Won – 2013 Bandung Film Festival for Best Film Leading Actress; Won – 2013 Maya Awards for Best Actress in a Leading Role |
| 2013 | Perawan Seberang | Yulia Sumbukurung | |
| 2013 | 3 Cewek Petualang | Sally | |
| 2014 | Caleg By Accident | Sundari | |
| 2014 | Main Dukun | Lyla | |
| 2014 | Merry Riana: Mimpi Sejuta Dolar | Office manager | Cameo appearance |

=== Television ===
| Year | Title | Role | Notes |
|---|---|---|---|
| 2002 | Cinta Lokasi | | |
| 2002 | Rahasia Ilahi | | |
| 2002 | Lepas Malam | | |
| 2002 | Maafkan Aku | | |
| 2002 | Komedi Nakal | | |
| 2003 | Penjaga Pantai | | |
| 2005–2006 | Hidayah | | |
| 2006 | Iman | | |
| 2006–2007 | Mimpi Manis | | |
| 2007 | Duyung Kembar Ketemu Tuyul | | |
| 2007 | Perempuan Teraniaya | | |
| 2008 | Do'a | Susi | Episode: "Cinta Buta Membawa Petaka" |
| 2010 | Superboy | Karin | Main role; 50 episodes |
| 2011 | Supergirl | Melinda | Recurring role; 25 episodes |
| 2011 | Memori Cinta | | Cancelled aired |
| 2014 | Pesbukers | Herself | Guest star later selected as regular cast member |

== Discography ==
=== Studio album ===
| Year | Title |
|---|---|
| 2008 | Kamasutra: First Studio Album; Label: –; Format: CD, digital download |

=== Soundtrack albums ===
| Year | Title |
|---|---|
| 2011 | Ost. Arwah Goyang Karawang: First Soundtrack Album; Label: –; Format: – |
| 2011 | Ost. Pocong Minta Kawin: Second Soundtrack Album; Label: –; Format: – |

== Awards ==
In 2013, Julia was honored with three awards:

- Honorable Best Actress for Gending Sriwijaya film in Bandung Film Festival 2013
- Chosen Best Actress in Maya Cup 2013
- Best Female Actress for Gending Sriwijaya film in Royal Bali Film Festival
