= Tukul Arwana =

Indonesian comedian (born 1963)

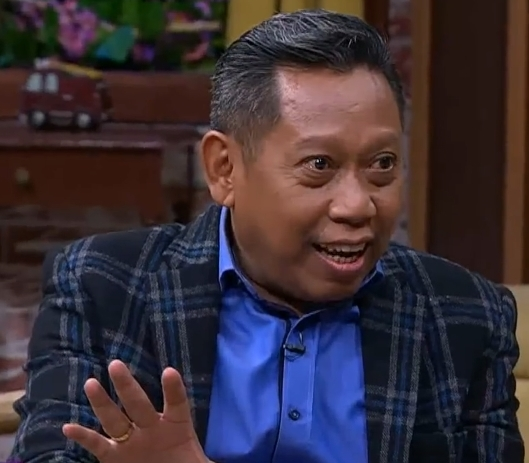
- Tukul Arwana in 2017
- Born: Riyanto; 16 October 1963 (age 62); Purwosari, Central Java, Indonesia
- Spouse: Hj. Susiana (m. 1995; died 2016)
- Children: 3
- Parents: Abdul Wahid (father); Sutimah Ninaeh (mother)

Comedy career
- Years active: 1992–present
- Genres: Alternative comedy; Character comedy; Insult comedy

Haji Riyanto or better known as Tukul Arwana (born 16 October 1963) is an Indonesian actor, comedian and presenter of Javanese descent.

== Early life ==
Tukul was born in Semarang, Central Java. When he was young, he often performed on stage during the celebrations of Indonesia's Independence Day. He once worked as a driver. A friend, Joko Dewo, persuaded him to move to Jakarta and initially supported him financially. Tukul then married a Padangese woman named Susiana, also known as Susi Similikiti Weleh Weleh, with whom he had a daughter.

== Career ==
Tukul began working on the radio, where he met other Indonesian comedians. The turning point in his career was when he starred with then-child star Joshua Suherman in a music video. He then moved to television and hosted programs for TPI and Indosiar. He is now best known for the chatshow Empat Mata.

=== Empat Mata ===
On 4 November 2008, Empat Mata was banned by the Indonesian Broadcasting Commission (KPI) following a fourth breach of the commission's guidelines after a guest on the show ate a live fish in front of the audience. The show subsequently resumed under the name Bukan Empat Mata, "bukan" being the Indonesian word for "not".
