= SCTV (TV network) =

Indonesian private television network

- Logo used since 2005
- Type: Television broadcaster
- Country: Indonesia
- Broadcast area: Nationwide
- Headquarters: SCTV Tower, Senayan City, Jl. Asia Afrika Lot 19, Tanah Abang, Central Jakarta

Programming
- Language: Indonesian
- Picture format: 1080i HDTV (downscaled to 16:9 576i for the SDTV feed)

Ownership
- Owner: Bimantara Citra (1987—2000); Napan Group (1987—2005); Indika Group (1996—2005); Emtek Media (since 2001)
- Parent: Emtek
- Sister channels: RCTI (1987—2000); Elshinta TV (2011—2013); Moji (since 2004); Indosiar (since 2011); Ajwa TV (since 2020); Mentari TV (since 2021)

History
- Founded: 5 May 1987; 39 years ago (Corporate); 24 August 1987; 39 years ago (Official and original birth date)
- Launched: 1 June 1990; 36 years ago (Trial broadcast); 24 August 1990; 36 years ago (Official broadcast)
- Founder: Sudwikatmono; Henry Pribadi; Mohammad Noer

Links
- Website: www.sctv.co.id

Availability

Terrestrial
- Digital Greater Jakarta: 24 (UHF); Channel 23
- Digital Regional branches: Check local frequencies (on Indonesian language)

PT Surya Citra Televisi (SCTV) is an Indonesian free-to-air private television network. It was the third national and second private television network after RCTI, Established on 5 May 1987 as PT Foresta Maju, changed the legal name of the corporate company with the writing SCTV until now is PT Surabaya Central Televisi on 27 September 1989 and second changed of corporate name until now on 14 September 1991. The official and original birth date coincides with the 25th anniversary of TVRI as official broadcast, 27th anniversary of the Indonesian first and public television network of the same name as a corporate and after 42th anniversary of Republic of Indonesia on 24 August 1987 and official broadcast to the private on that date 1990. It began as a local station in Surabaya with limited reach broadcasts before obtaining a national broadcasting license on 30 January 1993.

== History ==
PT Surya Citra Television (SCTV) originated as PT Foresta Maju, founded on 5 May 1987. along with the legal establishment of an official entity, the official and original birth date coincides with the 25th anniversary of TVRI as official broadcast, 27th anniversary of the Indonesian first and public television network of the same name as a corporate and after 42th anniversary of Republic of Indonesia on 24 August 1987 before officially airing. The company, owned by Henry Pribadi and Sudwikatmono, applied on 28 April 1989 for a permit to establish a limited-channel television station in Surabaya. Its establishment was supported by the former Governor of East Java, Mohammad Noer, who argued that TVRI Surabaya lacked sufficient funding and that alternative sources of information were needed. Initial approval was granted on 27 September 1989 by the Director General of Radio, Television, and Film, under the new company name PT Surabaya Central Televisi.

The groundbreaking ceremony for SCTV’s new office took place on 10 November 1989, coinciding with the commemoration of Heroes' Day. Construction of the building on Jalan Darmo Permai, Surabaya, began on 1 February 1990 and was attended by Minister of Information Harmoko. The project’s initial capital investment totalled IDR 150 billion and involved 200 employees. Under its limited-channel license, SCTV was initially intended to begin terrestrial broadcasts restricted to viewers with a decoder. A trial broadcast was planned for June 1990, lasting one month, during which programs were aired for eight hours a day without a decoder to introduce the station to the public.

In July 1990, however, the government issued a policy allowing private television stations to broadcast free-to-air. On 1 August 1990, SCTV received a principal permit enabling broadcasts to be received without a decoder. Subsequently, on 24 August 1990, SCTV formally launched with a new permit under a joint agreement with the Director of the TVRI Foundation. The station began broadcasting with a coverage radius of 80 km in Surabaya. Its inaugural broadcast featured TVRI’s anniversary greetings and an opening delivered by a female announcer.

== Programming ==
In its early years, SCTV’s programming closely resembled that of RCTI due to a collaborative arrangement, although the scheduling of shows differed. Following the end of this partnership, SCTV shifted its focus to imported content, particularly telenovelas and Mandarin dramas. The station also began introducing original series, which initially attracted modest viewership and catered primarily to a female audience. After a major rebrand in 1997, local drama series became the channel’s flagship programming under the “Sinetron Prima” banner. Notable shows included Deru Debu, Kisah Cinta Ratu Pantai Selatan, Tersayang, Wah Cantiknya, Si Cecep, and Dewi Fortuna, all of which gained significant popularity with audiences.

== Branding ==
SCTV's first (left), second (centre), and third (right) logos

SCTV’s first logo, introduced at its launch on 24 August 1990, featured a blue half-crescent and a red half-circle positioned above a grey rectangle, with the letters “SCTV” in Helvetica Black placed at the center. This design was the result of a public competition, in which one design was selected from 100 submissions for its ability to represent the broadcaster. The logo remained in use until 29 January 2005, when it was replaced by the channel’s current branding.
