= Panasonic Gobel Awards =

- Awarded for: Indonesian television
- Sponsored by: Panasonic
- Country: Indonesia
- Presented by: PT Panasonic Gobel Indonesia
- Formerly called: Panasonic Awards (1997-2009)
- First award: 1997
- Final award: 2019
- Website: www.panasonicgobelawards.com

Television/radio coverage
- Network: Indosiar (1997–1999; 2019); RCTI (2000–2018); MNCTV (2003–2018); GTV (2003–2018); UseeTV (2017) iNews (2017–2018); MNC Channels (2013–2018); TVRI (2018)

The Panasonic Gobel Awards (formerly Panasonic Awards) were annual awards presented to television programs and performances in Indonesia based on a people's choice poll. The first awards ceremony was held in 1997 in partnership with Tabloid Citra and aired on Indosiar. Media Nusantara Citra began conducting the awards in 2000, with broadcasting rights held by RCTI. In 2003, TPI and Global TV also began televising the awards.

In 2004, Tabloid Citra stopped polling, and instead, survey data from Nielsen Media Research was used, with results tabulated and audited by Ernst & Young.

In 2013, MNC Channels began broadcasting the Panasonic Gobel Awards. In 2017, UseeTV and iNews also started broadcasting the awards.

The event was handed over to other broadcasters afterward. In 2018, TVRI took over the Panasonic Gobel Awards. Following the establishment of the Indonesian Television Awards in 2016, MNC decided to end its contract with the Panasonic Gobel Awards after 2018. In 2019, Indosiar resumed hosting the awards, which was the last edition held.

The awards were discontinued after 2019.

== History ==
The Panasonic Awards were first held in 1997 in cooperation with PT. Panasonic Gobel Indonesia and Citra Tabloid (a publication of the Kompas Gramedia Group, which is no longer in circulation). The method for determining the winners was through a "Poll Image" distributed in mass media, which was then filled out in writing and returned by the public through the mail. According to Maman Suherman, one of the initiators of this event, the Panasonic Awards were intended to reflect the public's preferences for television shows and performers. This event is similar to the People's Choice Awards held in other countries.

== Purpose ==
The purpose of the Panasonic Gobel Awards is to provide viewers with the opportunity to choose the television shows or individuals they consider to be the best. Each person can freely and independently participate through a neutral and transparent polling method. The process is validated by an independent and credible tabulator, ensuring the integrity of the results.

== See also ==
- List of Asian television awards
