= List of Batak people =

This is a list of notable Batak people.

== Academicians and educators ==
- Amany Lubis, rector Syarif Hidayatullah State Islamic University
- Bakri Siregar, teacher, lecturer, and writer
- Harun Nasution, Islamic thought
- Lafran Pane, academician and Indonesian national hero
- Likas Tarigan, teacher and politician
- Melanchton Siregar, teacher and politician
- Pantur Silaban, lecturer and physicist
- Willem Iskander or Sati Nasution, teacher, founded Kweekschool Voor inlandsche onderwijzer in 1862 in Tano Bato, Mandailing Natal Regency.

== Architects ==
- Friedrich Silaban, designed the Istiqlal Mosque and Gelora Bung Karno Stadium among others.

== Athletes ==
- Akbar, football player
- Alamsyah Nasution, football player
- Alvin Abdul Halim, football player
- Ansyari Lubis, football player
- Anthony Sinisuka Ginting, badminton player
- Elsa Manora Nasution, swimmer
- Ferdinand Sinaga, football player
- Habib Nasution, swimmer
- Jesse Hutagalung, Dutch tennis player
- Mahyadi Panggabean, football player
- Muhammad Akbar Nasution, swimmer
- Radja Nainggolan, Belgian footballer
- Riko Simanjuntak, football player
- Rizky Yusuf Nasution, football player
- Saktiawan Sinaga, football player
- Samuel Christianson Simanjuntak, football player
- Sorie Enda Nasution, weightlifter
- Zakaria Nasution, swimmer

== Attorneys ==
- Adnan Buyung Nasution
- Hotman Paris Hutapea
- Ruhut Sitompul
- Tommy Sihotang
- Todung Mulya Lubis

== Authors ==
- Armijn Pane
- Dewi Lestari
- Iwan Simatupang
- Mochtar Lubis
- Merari Siregar, author of the first novel written in Indonesian.
- Muhammad Kasim Dalimunte, author of the first short story collection in the Indonesian literary canon.
- Norman Erikson Pasaribu, poet and short story writer
- Soeman Hasiboean, author of first detective novel in Indonesian.
- Sitor Situmorang

== Businesspeople ==
- Manampin Girsang

== Economists ==
- Arifin Siregar, governor of Indonesian central bank, Bank of Indonesia
- Darmin Nasution, governor of Indonesian central bank, Bank of Indonesia

== Entertainers ==
- Ahmad Zulkifli Lubis, actor
- Amir Pasaribu, pianist, composer and critic
- Anneth Delliecia, singer-songwriter
- Atiqah Hasiholan, model and actress
- Bill Saragih, jazz musician
- Cas Alfonso, singer-songwriter
- Charles Bonar Sirait, television presenter
- Diana Nasution, singer
- Fatin Shidqia, singer
- Gloria Jessica, singer
- Joy Destiny Tobing, singer
- Judika, singer
- Lyodra Ginting, singer
- Melaney Ricardo, presenter, actress, radio announcer
- Nadin Amizah, singer-songwriter
- Nadya Hutagalung, actress
- Naura Ayu, singer and actress
- Novita Dewi, singer
- Prisia Nasution, martial artist
- Putri Ayu Silaen, singer
- Rinto Harahap, musician and ballad singer
- Sari Simorangkir, singer
- Sharena, model and actress
- Titi DJ, singer-songwriter
- Tumpal Tampubolon, film director, screenwriter, actor
- Umar Lubis, actor
- Wafda Saifan, singer
- Zivanna Letisha Siregar, model

== Historical figures ==
- Sisingamangaraja XII, the last Batak priest-king and a National Hero of Indonesia

== Journalists ==
- Mochtar Lubis, journalist, writer
- Putra Nababan, journalist, news presenter, politician
- Rosianna Silalahi, journalist, news presenter
- Sanusi Pane, journalist, writer

== Military ==
- Abdul Haris Nasution, five-star general, leader of Indonesian army forces
- Feisal Tanjung, leader of Indonesian army forces
- Maraden Panggabean, leader of Indonesian army forces
- T.B. Simatupang, leader of Indonesian army forces
- Donald Izacus Panjaitan, Indonesian revolutionary hero
- Zulkifli Lubis, first chairman of Intelligence Agency in Indonesia

== Politicians ==
- Abdul Rasjid, Volksraad member and physician
- Adam Malik, former Indonesian vice president and 26th President of the United Nations General Assembly
- Akhyar Nasution, former mayor of Medan
- Amir Sjarifuddin, former Indonesian prime minister
- Bobby Nasution, mayor of Medan
- Burhanuddin Harahap, former Indonesian prime minister
- Ferdinand Lumban Tobing, former Indonesian minister of Manpower and Transmigration
- Kaharuddin Nasution, former governor of Riau and North Sumatra
- Lintong Mulia Sitorus, writer and general secretary of Socialist Party of Indonesia
- Luhut Binsar Pandjaitan, Indonesian minister
- Malam Sambat Kaban, Indonesian government minister
- Mangaradja Soeangkoepon, Volksraad member
- Oloan Hutapea, briefly head of the Communist Party (PKI)
- Peris Pardede, Communist politician and political prisoner
- Raja Inal Siregar, former governor of North Sumatera
- Sabam Sirait, member of the People's Representative Council
- Saifuddin Nasution Ismail, a member of the Malaysian Parliament and People's Justice Party
- Sondang Tiar Debora Tampubolon, politician, member of the House of Representatives
- Sutan Mohammad Amin Nasution, former governor of North Sumatra and Riau
- Urbanus Pardede, Communist politician and newspaper editor
- Zainul Arifin, former Deputy Prime Minister of Indonesia

== Religious leaders ==
- Alfred Gonti Pius Datubara, Roman Catholic Archbishop of Medan
- Anicetus Bongsu Antonius Sinaga, Roman Catholic Archbishop of Medan
- Assim al-Hakeem, Islamic cleric
- Martinus Dogma Situmorang, Roman Catholic Bishop of Padang
- Ludovikus Simanullang, Roman Catholic Bishop of Sibolga
- Darwin Lumbantobing, 16th Ephorus of the Batak Christian Protestant Church
- Ramlan Hutahaean, 9th General Secretary of the Batak Christian Protestant Church
- S.A.E. Nababan, Lutheran theologian, Ephorus of the Batak Christian Protestant Church
- Sholeh Mahmoed Nasution, Islamic preacher

== Visual artists ==
- Dolorosa Sinaga, sculptor
- Aisha Cissé, 21st century 2D animator

== Other ==
- Reynhard Sinaga, convicted of rape in the United Kingdom

== See also ==
- Batak
- North Sumatera
- List of Acehnese people
- List of Bugis people
- List of Chinese Indonesians
- List of Javanese
- List of Minangkabau people
- List of Moluccan people
- List of Sundanese people
