= Marga (Batak) =

Clan name in Batak societies

Batak clans, also known as marga (in Batak languages), (Note: in Karo Batak specifically, it is spelt as merga) are a system of patrilineal kinship among the Batak — the indigenous group of central-northern regions of the Indonesian island of Sumatra. The Batak people consists of several ethnic groups, each with its own clans, which identifies ancestry and social relationships.

The term is derived either from the Sanskrit varga, meaning company, party, or group, or, more likely, from the Sanskrit marga, meaning 'road, way or path', referring to a people of 'one origin'.

Batak marga are patrilineal. Marriage in the same marga is strictly forbidden by tribal law (adat) even between people only distantly related, but it is allowed and often even arranged between cousins of the maternal line (boru). After marriage, Batak women do not change their family (marga) name but add "boru" to their birth name. Since Batak marga are patrilineal, the children will inherit the marga from their father.

In Batak Toba mythology, marga is traced to the common ancestor "Si Raja Batak" (The King of Batak). In Karo mythology, the five marga (Merga Silima) are defined in terms of matrimonial bonds, with no importance placed on a common ancestor myth. Simalungun people have four basic marga, each seen as equal, and likewise with no common ancestor myth.

== Examples of marga ==
These are examples of Batak surnames with articles in English Wikipedia:

- Batubara: Adam Malik Batubara (3rd Vice President of Indonesia), Cosmas Batubara (former minister during Suharto era)
- Datubara: Alfred Gonti Pius Datubara (archbishop)
- Ginting: Lyodra Ginting (singer), Anthony Sinisuka Ginting (badminton player), Tanta Ginting (Actor)
- Girsang: Manampin Girsang (furniture entrepreneur)
- Gultom: Ivan Doly Gultom (politician), Gloria Jessica Ulima Gultom (singer)
- Harahap: Burhanuddin Harahap (former Prime Minister), Amir Sjarifoeddin Harahap (former Prime Minister)
- Hasibuan: Anniesa Hasibuan (fashion designer and fraudster)
- Hutabarat: Norfriansyah Yosua Hutabarat (murdered police officer)
- Hutagalung: Nadya Hutagalung (Indonesian-Australian model and actress), Jesse Hutagalung (Dutch tennis player)
- Hutahaean: Ramlan Hutahaean (Protestant clergyman), Ferdinand Hutahaean (politician)
- Hutapea: Hotman Paris Hutapea (lawyer)
- Hutauruk: Berlian Hutauruk (singer)
- Kaban: Malam Sambat Kaban (minister)
- Lubis: Umar Lubis (actor), Todung Mulya Lubis (advocate and activist), Fatin Shidqia Lubis (singer)
- (Lumban) Tobing: Ferdinand Lumban Tobing (physician), Joy Tobing (Indonesian singer), Darwin Lumbantobing (Protestant clergyman)
- Malau: Yoseph Malau (footballer)
- Manik: El Manik (actor)
- Marbun: Timothy Marbun (TV presenter)
- Marpaung: Novita Dewi Marpaung (singer)
- Nababan: Putra Nababan (journalist)
- Nainggolan: Radja Nainggolan (Belgian footballer), Alfoncius Dapot Parulian "Cas Alfonso" Nainggolan (singer)
- Nasution: Abdul Haris Nasution (Indonesian Army general), Darmin Nasution (economist), Adnan Buyung Nasution (lawyer), Diana Nasution (singer), Prisia Nasution (model and actress), Bobby Nasution (Joko Widodo's son-in-law), Kaharuddin Nasution (governor and lieutenant-general), Anneth Delliecia Nasution (singer), Saifuddin Nasution (Malaysian minister), Sholeh Mahmoed Nasution (Muslim televangelist), Arswendy Bening Swara (Indonesian actor)
- Pakpahan: Muchtar Pakpahan (labour activist)
- Pane: Armijn Pane (writer)
- Panggabean: Maraden Panggabean (general and politician), Mahyadi Panggabean (footballer)
- Panjaitan: D. I. Panjaitan (Indonesian military leader), Luhut Binsar Panjaitan (politician)
- Pasaribu: Masinton Pasaribu (politician), Chandra Stevan Pasaribu (singer)
- Pohan: Zainul Arifin Pohan (Muslim scholar)
- Rangkuti: Hamsad Rangkuti (writer)
- Sagala
- Saragih: Bill Saragih (jazz musician)
- Sarumpaet: Ratna Sarumpaet (artist and activist)
- Sembiring: Tifatul Sembiring (politician)
- Sihotang: Tommy Sihotang (attorney general)
- Sihombing
- Silaban: Pantur Silaban (physicist)
- Silaen: Putri Ayu Silaen (singer)
- Silalahi: Rosianna Silalahi (news anchor), Duma Riris Silalahi (runner-up of Puteri Indonesia), Sudi Silalahi (minister)
- Simangunsong: Dewi Lestari Simangunsong (singer-songwriter)
- Simanjuntak: Riko Simanjuntak (Indonesian footballer), Marsillam Simanjuntak (attorney general and minister)
- Simanullang: Ludovikus Simanullang (bishop)
- Simatupang: Tahi Bonar Simatupang (former chief of staff of Indonesian Armed Forces)
- Simarmata: Ledy Simarmata (News Presenter)
- Simorangkir: Sari Simorangkir (gospel singer-songwriter)
- Sinaga: Reynhard Sinaga (criminal), Ferdinand Sinaga (footballer), Saktiawan Sinaga (footballer), Anicetus Bongsu Antonius Sinaga (archbishop)
- Sinambela: Mahadi Sinambela (politician)
- Sirait: Sabam Sirait (Member of the Regional Representative Council)
- Siregar: Mahendra Siregar (economist and politician), Zivanna Letisha Siregar (model), Merari Siregar (writer), Arifin Siregar (politician), Raja Inal Siregar (governor)
- Sitanggang: Paulo Sitanggang (footballer)
- Sitompul: Ruhut Sitompul (actor and lawyer)
- Sitorus: Martua Sitorus (Indonesian businessman)
- Situmorang: Sitor Situmorang (author), Martinus Dogma Situmorang (bishop)
- Tambunan: Edward Wellington Pahala Tambunan (governor)
- Tampubolon: Sondang Tampubolon (politician), Tumpal Tampubolon (film director)
- Tarigan: Likas Tarigan (teacher and politician)
