= Ludovikus Simanullang =

Indonesian bishop

Ludovikus Simanullang OFMCap
- Bishop Diocese of Sibolga
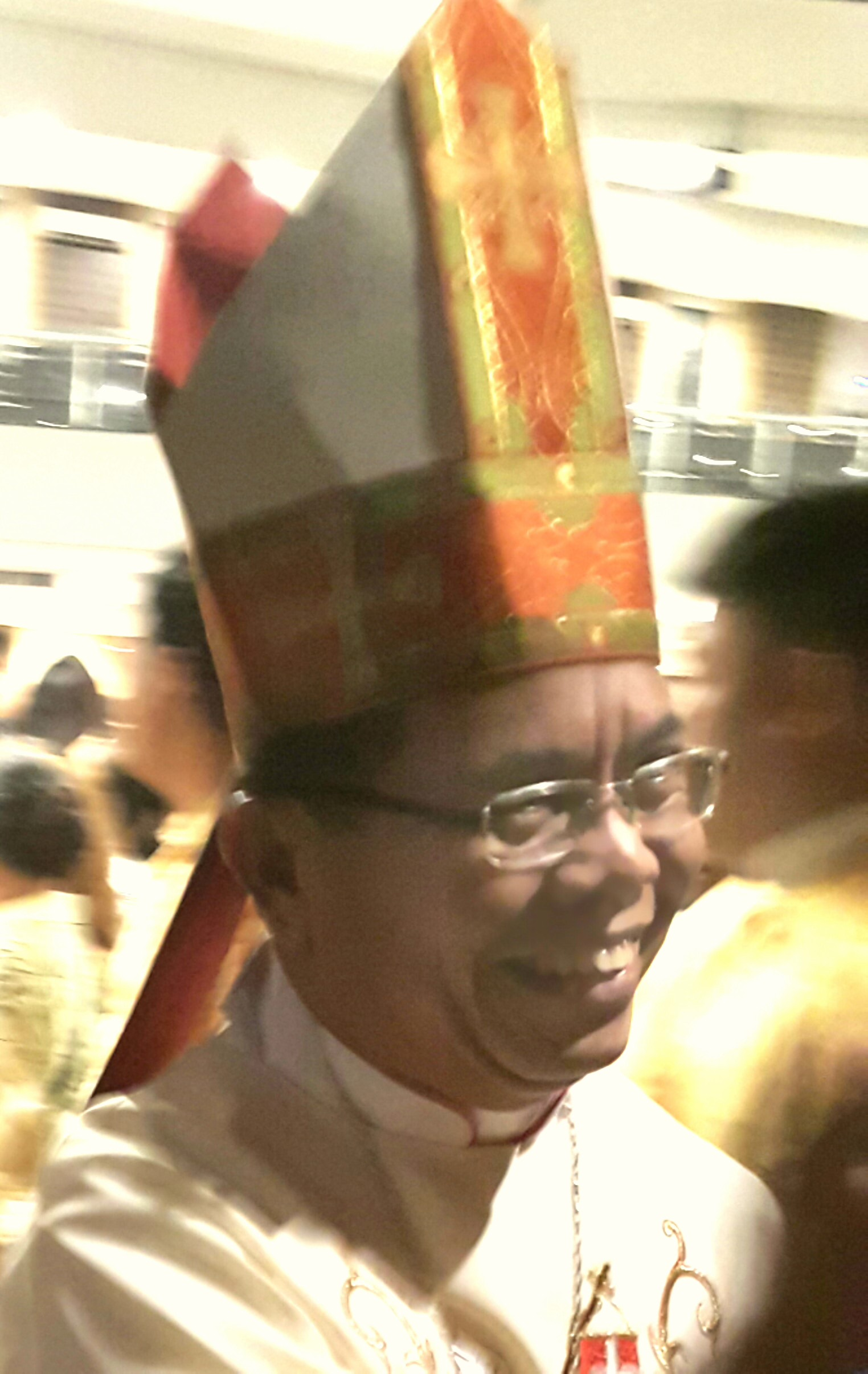
- Simanullang in 2017
- Church: Roman Catholic Church
- See: Diocese of Sibolga
- In office: 2007–2018
- Predecessor: Anicetus Bongsu Antonius Sinaga
- Successor: Fransiskus Tuaman Sinaga
- Previous post: Priest

Orders
- Ordination: 10 Jul 1983
- Consecration: 20 May 2007
- Rank: Bishop

Personal details
- Born: 23 April 1955 Central Tapanuli Regency, North Sumatra, Indonesia
- Died: 20 September 2018 (aged 63) Medan, North Sumatra, Indonesia

Ludovikus Simanullang OFMCap (23 April 1955 – 20 September 2018) was an Indonesian Roman Catholic bishop.

Simanulang was born in Sogar in Central Tapanuli Regency, Indonesia, and was ordained to the priesthood in 1983. He served as a bishop of the Roman Catholic Diocese of Sibolga, Indonesia from 2007 until his death. He was a member of the Order of Friars Minor Capuchin.

== Biography ==
On 2 August 1981, Simanullang took his final vows as a Capuchin. He was ordained a priest on 10 July 1983. From 1984 to 1989, he was the Church of St. Hilarius Parish pastor in the village of Tarutung Bolak, Central Tapanuli Regency, and the Teluk Dalam Nias Parish in Nias. From 1989 to 1994, he took a break from pastoral work and studied at the Pontifical University Antonianum. In 1997, Mgr. Ludovikus was elected Provincial Minister in the Capuchin Province of St. Fidelis, Sibolga, a post he occupied from 1997 to 2007.

On 14 March 2007, Simanullang was appointed to be bishop of Sibolga. On 20 May 2007, he was ordained bishop by Leopoldo Girelli, then Apostolic Nunciature to Indonesia, who served as consecrator. The principal co-consecrators were Martinus Dogma Situmorang OFMCap then bishop of Padang, and Anicetus Bongsu Antonius Sinaga OFMCap then coadjutor archbishop of Medan.

In June 2016, the diocese of Sibolga released a letter written by Simanullang the previous month urging priests not to run for public office. This was in response to a request by a priest named Rantinus Manalu, who was running and ultimately elected to office in Central Tapanuli Regency. Simanullang felt that by participating directly in government, Manalu and others had violated the canon laws of the Catholic faith.

Simanullang died on 20 September 2018, having been taken to hospital ill on 1 September 2018.
