= Gérard Moussay =

Gérard Moussay (16 August 1932, Brecé, Mayenne - 1 February 2012 in Paris) was a French Catholic missionary. He was also a specialist on Cam and Minangkabau languages.

== Biography ==
=== 1954–1975 ===
Born from a farming family, he was the oldest of four children. He studied at the Petit and Grand Séminaries of Laval before joining Missions Etrangères de Paris on 20 September 1954. Ordained on 29 June 1957 at Laval, soon after he was sent to Viet Nam for his first mission of Nha Trang. He studied Vietnamese at Banam (about 60 km southeast Phnom Penh, the capital of Cambodia). In 1954, when Viet Nam was divided into the North and the South of the 17th parallel, some hundreds of thousands of northern refugees (mostly devout Catholics) were settled by small groups in different southern provinces especially where the field was not yet exploited because most of them came from the countryside in the North. So between 1958 and 1968, Gérard Moussay was in charge of these Catholics in two provinces of Ninh Thuân and Binh Tuy. Particularly he founded two parishes of Hiêp Nghia and Hiêp An.

==== Vietnamese language ====
Close to his parishioners and being good at language, he spoke impeccable Vietnamese. It was not rare hearing from him a popular expression as " ông Ke " (M. Ke an imaginary terrible man picking up children who don't behave themselves, so when they cry or don't want to sleep their mother reminds them of M. Ke) or a proverb as "an trai nho ke trông cây" (literally: eating a fruit to remember who plants the tree).

==== Cam language ====
In 1968 he settled in Phan Rang (Ninh Thuân Province) among Cam people (Chams). In the early 1970s, they were around 40 000 including Cam inhabitants in the neighbourhood (Phan Ri). He set up the Cam Cultural Centre to study the Cam language and to form a team of researchers with the cooperation of old Cam scholars. They collected ancient texts, translated them and published them. A Cam-Vietnamese-French dictionary was issued in 1971. Two thirds of this population "follow a religion which was no doubt Brahmanism in the past but it is now only a distant souvenir of the religion coming from India". The last third are the so-called Banis who are descendants of Cam families who have opted for Islam since the 14th or 15th century. These two communities have their villages, theirs clergies, their own rites. They don't get married between them but keeping their relationship (same Cam calendar and some formal occasions). A small part of this ethnic group establishes in southwestern Viet Nam not far from the border of Cambodia. In this country however were living the majority of Cam people. That was what pointed out Gérard Moussay when he had arrived into Phan Rang.

=== 1976–1993 ===
==== Minangkabau language ====
July 1976, Gérard Moussay moved to the Padang diocese on the western coast of Sumatra Indonesia. Before leaving Paris, he did an intensive course of Indonesian organized at the head office of Missions Etrangeres de Paris. Afterwards, he was instructed in the Minangkabau language. The close link between these languages with that of Cam people made his task easier. Between August 1978 and May 1979, he undertook a course of Arabic and islamology at Rome. Devoting to his duty of assistant-priest (1978–1981) then priest (1981–1993) at Bukittinggi, meanwhile he drew up the grammar of Minangkabau language in which he had a doctorate at School for Advanced Studies in the Social Sciences (Ecole des Hautes Etudes en Sciences Sociales (EHESS)) in 1982. To prepare a Minangkabau-Indonesian-French dictionary, Gérard Moussay and his Minang contributors were examining in systematic manner all newspapers and magazines occurred between 1965 and 1990. Throughout this work he wished to introducing "a Minangkabau language such as one speaks and writes it today ". Furthermore, by means of references might be found out all of literature of proverbs, sentences, popular stories.... This dictionary will be published only in 1995 in Paris.

=== 1993–2012 ===
Early 1993, Gérard Moussay was appointed to carry out the Archives of Missions Etrangères de Paris of which he was in charge until his death early 2012. Throughout these years, with the help of some assistants he made an inventory of numerous documents such as dictionaries, travel books, correspondence between missionaries... throughout continents and centuries. He remade the internal organization in view to receiving researchers and students putting at their disposal, along with his own experience, the documentary treasures dating back to many centuries. Under his direction were published many books (directories of follow-members of Missions Etrangères, their bibliographies ... ). He took an active part during the exhibition celebrating the 350th anniversary of Missions Etrangères's foundation in 2008.

== Bibliography ==
- 1971 - Coup d’oeil sur les Cam d’aujourd’hui (Glimpse on Cam people today). Bull. Soc. Etudes Indoch., 46, 361–374, 1 map, 2 pl.. Saigon.
- 1971, et al. - Dictionnaire cam-vietnamien-français, 498 p.. Index français-cam & index vietnamien-français, 94 p.. Index français-cam et index des noms scientifiques (French-Cam index and index of scientific names). Cam Cultural Centre (Trung tâm Van hoa Chàm). Phan Rang (Viet Nam).
- 197? – Rôh twah "Suu tâm" (Research of Rôh twah). Périodicité variable (variable frequency). 1 : Vê ngôn ngu Chàm (About Cam language), 28 p. . 2 : Ariya um-murup, dalikal ja bilot, 51 p. . Trung -tâm Van-hoa Chàm (Cam Cultural Centre). Phan Rang (Viet Nam).
- 1974, et al. - Khao luc nguyên cao chàm = Archives des manuscrits cam, en langue cam (Archive of Cam manuscripts, in Cam language). Vol. 1: Akayet Dewa Mano = Geste de Dewa Mano & 3 contes (Action of Dewa Mano & 3 stories), 95 p.. Vol. 2: Rites d’exorcismes, interprétation des songes, rites de purification (Rites of exhorcisms, interpretation of dreams, rites of purification), 133 p.. Trung-tâm Van-hoa Chàm (Cam Cultural Centre). Phan Rang (Viet Nam).
- 1974 - Van minh sac tôc Chàm (Civilisation of Cam minority). In Vietnamese, 26 p.. Viên Dai Hoc Da Lat (University of Da Lat), Da Lat.
- 1974 – Pram Dit Pram Lak : la geste de Rama dans la littérature cam (Pram Dit Pram Lak : action of Rama in Cam literature. Actes du 29è Congrès International des Orientalistes, Asie du sud-est continental (Proceedings of 29th International Conference of the Orientalists, Continental Southeast Asia), vol.2, 131–135. Paris.
- 1975 – Akayet Dewa Mano (translated from Cam language and annotated by G. Moussay). Ecole Pratique des Hautes Etudes (E.P.H.E.), 4th section, 411 p.. Paris.
- 1977, G. Jacques, P.B. Laffont, G. Moussay et al. - Essai de translittération raisonnée du cam (Essay of reasoned transliteration of Cam language). Bull. Ecole Fr. Extrême-Orient, 64, 243–255. Paris.
- 1981 - Pram Dit Pram Lak : cerita Rama dalam Sastra Cam = Geste de Rama dans la littérature cam (Action of Rama in Cam literature). Kerajaan Campa/penyusun, Ecole Française d’Extrême-Orient, 187–194, Indonesian language. Jakarta.
- 1981 – La langue minangkabau (The language of Minangkabau). Cahier d’Archipel, 14, 339 p., 4 cartes. Association Archipel. Paris.
- 1986 - La langue minangkabau (The language of Minangkabau). Cahier d’Archipel 14, 313–331. Paris.
- 1986 - Indonésie : le pays Minangkabau (Sumatra) (Indonesia : the country of Minangkabau (Sumatra)). Echos Missionnaires, 203, 49–55. Paris.
- 1986 – Une grande figure de l’Islam indonésien : Buya HAMKA (A great portrait of Indonesian Islam). Archipel, 32, 87–112. Paris.
- 1988 - Pram Dit Pram Lak : cerita Rama dalam Sastra Cam = Geste de Rama dans la littérature cam (Action de Rama in the Cam literature). Sejarah dan Kebudayaan Campa. Kementerian Kebudayaan dan Pelancongan , 299–307, in Malay language. Ecole Française d’Extrême-Orient. Kuala Lumpur (Malaisie).
- 1989, Moussay Gérard and Po Darma - Akayet Dewa Mano : versi Cam dari Hikayat Dewa Mandu Melayu = version cam de l’Hikayat Dewa Mandu malais (Cam version of Malay Hikayat Dewa Mandu). Kementerian Kebudayaan dan Pelancongan & Ecole Fr. Extrême-Orient. Text in Cam and French. Kuala Lumpur.
- 1989 – Les Affixes en minangkabau (The affixes in Minangkabau language). Conférence Internationale sur la Langue Malaise (International conference on Malay Language), Université Malaya, 21-23 août. Kuala Lumpur (Malaisie).
- 1990 – L’Eglise en Indonésie (The Church in Indonesia). Eglise d’Asie, 7, 1–16. Paris.
- 1990 – Akayet Inra Patra : version cam de l’Hikayat malais Indraputera (Akayet Inra Patra : Cam version of Malay Hikayat Indraputera. In Le Monde indochinois et la péninsule malaise, 101–114. Paris.
- 1991 – Um Mrup dans la littérature cam (Um Mrup in the Cam literature). In Le Campa et le Monde malais. Centre d’Histoire et Civilisation de la Péninsule indochinoise (ACHCPI)(Centre of History and Civilisation of Indochinese Peninsula), 95–107. Paris.
- 1993 – La Région hindoue à Bali (The Hindu Area at Bali). In Dictionnaire des Religions, 178–179. Paris.
- 1993 – L’Islam en Indonésie (The Islam in Indonesia). In Dictionnaire des Religions, 953–957. Paris.
- 1993 – La Religion de Java (the Region of Java). In Dictionnaire des Religions, 1011–1014. Paris.
- 1994 – Epopées cam (Cam Epics). In La littérature de la voix, INALCO : Centre de Recherche sur l’Oralité, 53–67. Paris.
- 1995 – Dictionnaire Minangkabau-Indonésien-Français, 2 vol., 1328 p.. Cahier d’Archipel 27. L’Harmattan. Paris.
- 1995 – La geste de Um Mrup : Campa (traduit par G. Moussay) (Action of Um Mrup : Champa (translated by G. Moussay). In Notes sur la culture et la religion en Péninsule indochinoise : en hommage à Pierre-Bernard Lafont, 189–198. Paris.
- 1997, Moussay G. et al. - Missions étrangères et langues orientales_ Contribution de la Société des Missions étrangères à la connaissance de 60 langues d’Asie_ Bibliographie de 1680 jusqu’à 1996 (Foreign Missions and oriental languages_Contribution of Foreign Missions Society to the knowledge of 60 languages in Asia_Bibliography from 1680 to 1996), 210 p.. Missions étrangères de Paris, ISBN 2-7384-5053-9. Paris.
- 1997, Po Darma, G. Moussay and Abdul Karim – Akayet Inra Patra (Hikayat Inra Patra) = Epopée Inra Patra (Epic of Inra Patra). Kementarian Kebudayaan, Kesenian dan Pelancongan Malaysia & Ecole Française d’Extrême- Orient, 187 p.. Text in Malay and French. Kuala Lumpur.
- 1998, Po Darma, G. Moussay and Abdul Karim – Akayet Dowa Mano (Hikayat Dowa Mano) = Epopée Dowa Mano (Epic of Dowa Mano). Kementarian Kebudayaan, Kesenian dan Pelancongan Malaysia et Ecole Française d’Extrême-Orient, 215 p.. Text in Malay and French. Kuala Lumpur.
- 1998 – Tata Bahasa Minangkabau ( Grammar of Minangkabau). 372 p.. Penerjemah Rahayu S. Hidayat. Jakarta.
- 1999 - Tissages cam (Cam weavings). In Through the thread of time: Southeast Asian textiles : the James H.W.Thompson Foundation Symposium / edited by Jane Puranananda, 18 p. Bangkok.
- 2000, Po Darma, G. Moussay and Abdul Karim – Nai mai mang Makah : Tuan Puteri dari Kelantan= La princesse qui venait du Kelantan (The princess who came from Kelantan). Kementarian Kebudayaan, Kesenian dan Pelancongan Malaysia & Ecole Française d’Extrême- Orient, 162 p.. Text in Malay and French. Kuala Lumpur.
- 2000, Moussay G. and Duong Tan Thi – Peribahasa Cam = Dictons et proverbes cam (Cam maxims and proverbs). Kementarian Kebudayaan, Kesenian dan Pelancongan Malaysia & Ecole Française d’Extrême- Orient, 174 p.. Texte en malais et en français. Kuala Lumpur (Malaisie).
- 2004, Moussay G. and Appavou Brigitte – Répertoire des membres de la Société des Missions Etrangères 1659-2004 (Directory of fellow-members of Foreign Missions Society 1659–2004), 603 p.. Archives des Missions Etrangères (ISBN 2-914402-40-6) et Les Indes Savantes (ISBN 2-84654-072-1). Paris.
- 2006 – Grammaire de la langue cam, préface de Pierre-Bernard Lafont (Grammar of Cam language, foreword of Pierre-Bernard Lafont), 285 p.. Missions Etrangères de Paris et Les Indes Savantes (ISBN 2-84654-138-8). Paris.
- 2008, Launay M. and Moussay G. – Les Missions Etrangères : trois siècles et demi d’histoire et d’aventure en Asie (The Foreign Missions : three centuries and a half of history and of adventure in Asia). Librairie Académique Perrin. Paris.
- 2008, Moussay G. et al. – Bibliographie des Missions Etrangères-Civilisations, Religions et Langues de l’Asie (Bibliography of Foreign Missions-Civilisations, Religions and Languages of Asia), 607 p.. Missions Etrangères de Paris et Les Indes Savantes (ISBN 978-2-84654-179-4). Paris.
- 2009, Moussay G. et al. – The Missions Etrangères in Asia and the Indian Ocean, 205 p., grand format. Missions Etrangères de Paris et Les Indes Savantes (ISBN 978-2-84654-212-8). Paris.
