= Sinaga =

Sinaga (meaning "dragon" ) is a Batak surname (marga). Notable people with the name include:

- Anicetus Bongsu Antonius Sinaga (born 1941), Indonesian Roman Catholic bishop
- Ferdinand Sinaga (born 1988), Indonesian footballer
- Hadrianus Sinaga (1912–1981), Indonesian politician and government minister
- Mangaradja Sinaga (1924–2000), Indonesian colonel and politician
- Reynhard Sinaga (1983-), Indonesian convicted of rape in the United Kingdom
- Saktiawan Sinaga (born 1982), Indonesian footballer

Telly Nathalia of the Jakarta Globe stated in 2020 that many Batak people maintain detailed family records, and that "many Sinagas are prominent individuals in Indonesia". According to Telly Nathalia, the "The clan is believed to have existed" around or before circa 1420.
