= Immaculate Conception of Mary Cathedral, Medan =

Gereja Katedral Medan
- Immaculate Conception of Mary Cathedral
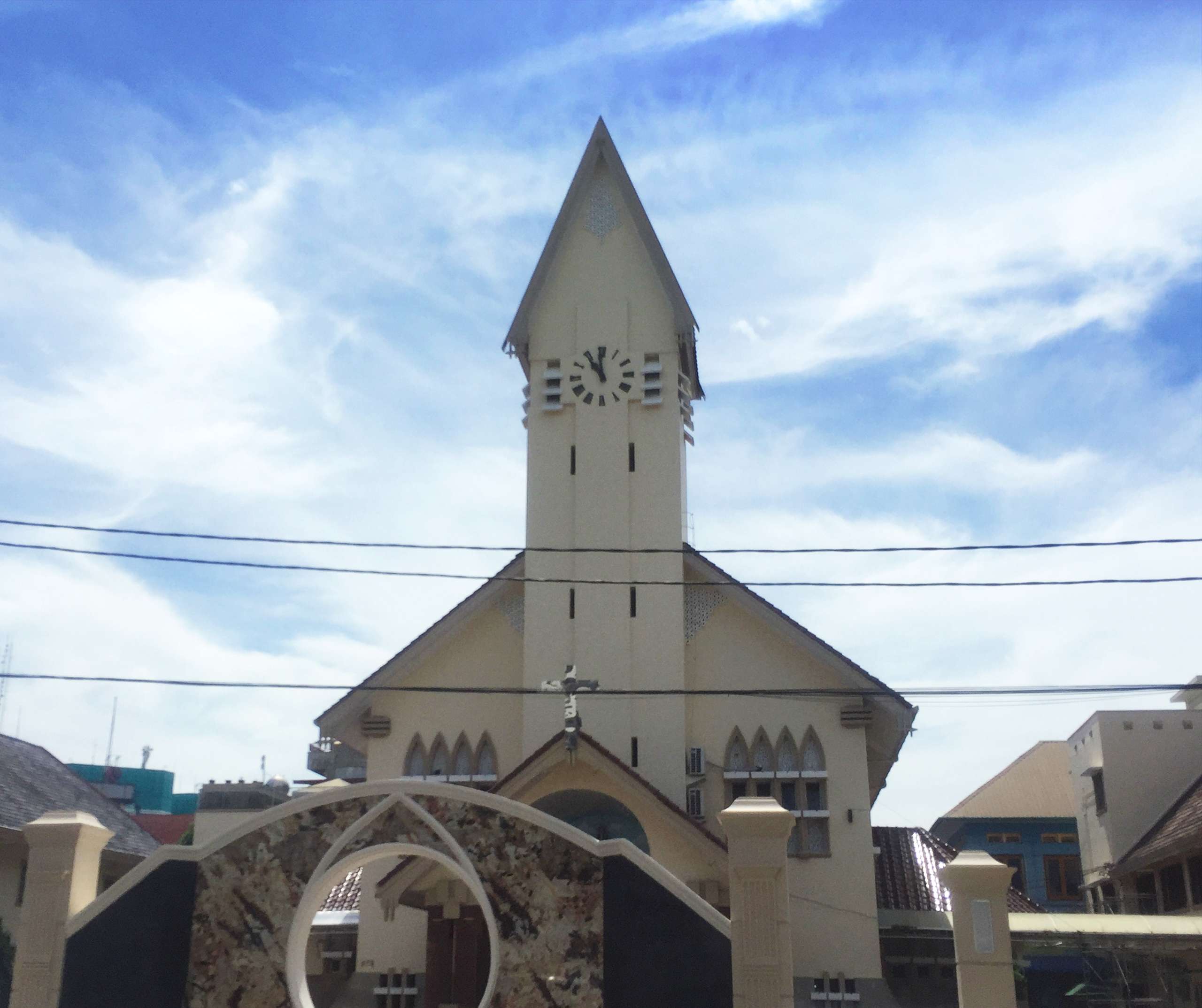
- The front view of the Cathedral

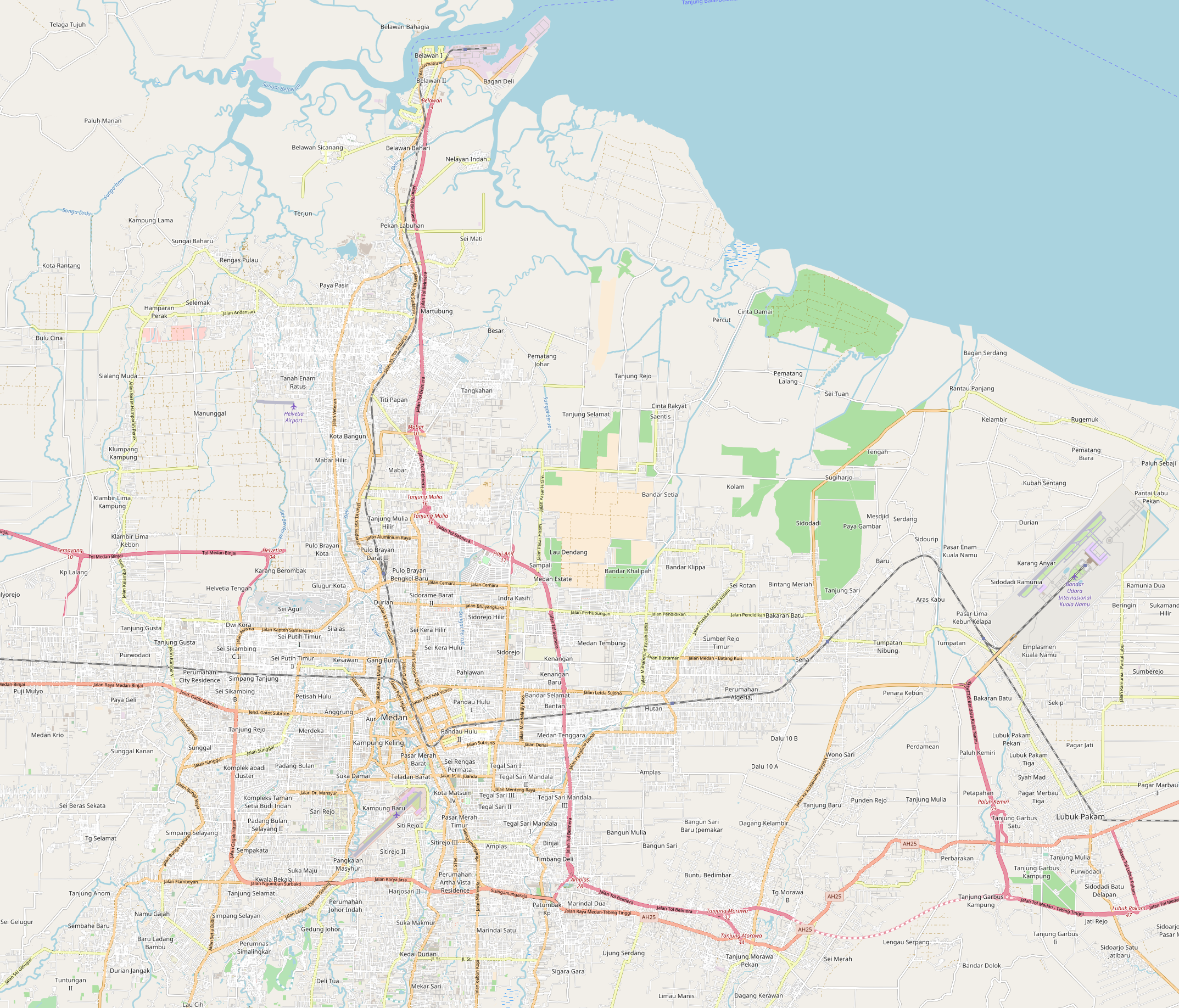
- Location in Medan
- 3.584224°N 98.681374°E
- Location: Medan Maimun, Medan
- Country: Indonesia
- Denomination: Roman Catholic
- Website: katedralmedan.or.id

History
- Status: Cathedral
- Founder: Order of Friars Minor Capuchin
- Consecrated: 30 January 1928

Architecture
- Functional status: Active
- Architect: Han Groenewegen
- Style: Modernist, Nieuwe Zakelijkheid
- Groundbreaking: 20 March 1878
- Completed: 30 January 1928

Specifications
- Capacity: 2000

Administration
- Archdiocese: Medan
- Deanery: Medan Cathedral

Clergy
- Archbishop: Kornelius Sipayung, OFMCap
- Rector: Sesarius Petrus Mau
- Vicar: Manuntun Marihot Simanjuntak
- Priest(s): Frietz R Tambunan; Benno Ola Tage

Medan Cathedral (Indonesian: Gereja Katedral Medan) is a Roman Catholic Cathedral in Medan, Indonesia. The current cathedral was inaugurated in 1928. It is one of the Dutch colonial buildings in Medan.

== History ==
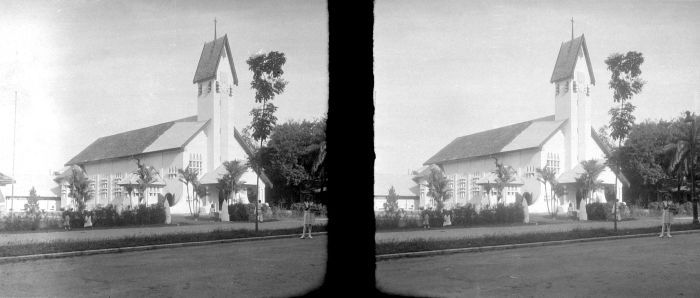
The Cathedral, 1920

At its inception in 1879, the Cathedral Church of Medan is a leaf-roofed hut and thatched roofed place of worship for dozens of Catholics (the majority ethnic Tamil Indian and the Netherlands) at Jl Pemuda No 1 (formerly: Paleisstraat; Istana Street). In 1884, the congregation had grown to 193 people.

Construction of a new church was initiated in 1905 when the Catholics were numbered 1200 people. The construction was carried out by the Jesuit priest who worked in the field. The new church was inaugurated in November of that year, the new church was made of stone walls and tin roof, with some parts still made of thatched palm leaves.

The Tamil Indians later built for themselves a Parish at Jalan Hayam Wuruk in Medan Baru area, called as St. Anthony's Church, annexed to it were housing of Tamil Catholic Indians known as Kampung Kristen or Kovil Kambam in Tamil, Presently Jalan Mataram where the Catholic Center is built.

On January 30, 1928, the church was expanded into its current form following a design by Dutch architect Han Groenewegen.

== See also ==
- Catholicism in Indonesia
- List of church buildings in Indonesia
