= Sirait =

Batak surname originating in Indonesia

Sirait is one of Toba Batak clans originating in North Sumatra, Indonesia. People of this clan bear the clan's name as their surname. Notable people of this clan include:

- Charles Bonar Sirait (born 1971), Indonesian television presenter
- Linton Sirait, Indonesian judge
- Maruarar Sirait (born 1969), Indonesian politician
- Sabam Sirait (1936-2021), Indonesian politician
