= Fransiskus Tuaman Sinaga =

Indonesian Catholic bishop (born 1972)

His Excellency, The Most Reverend Fransiskus Tuaman Sinaga
- Bishop of Sibolga
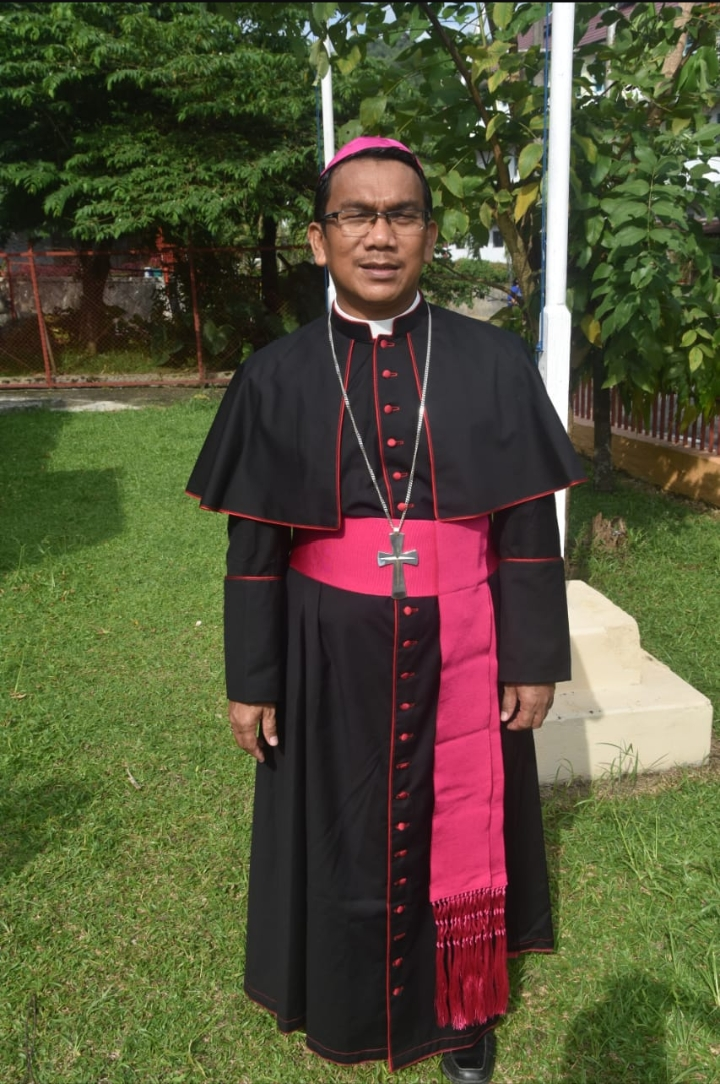
- Diocese: Diocese of Sibolga
- Appointed: 6 March 2021
- Installed: 29 July 2021
- Predecessor: Ludovikus Simanullang

Orders
- Ordination: 14 February 2003 by Anicetus Bongsu Antonius Sinaga
- Consecration: 29 July 2021 by Ignatius Suharyo Hardjoatmodjo

Personal details
- Born: Fransiskus Tuaman Sasfo Sinaga; 22 November 1972 (age 53) Penggalangan, North Sumatra, Indonesia
- Education: Pontifical Urban University
- Motto: Lauderis, Domine, Deus meus (Latin for 'May you be praised, O Lord, my God')

Fransiskus Tuaman Sinaga (born 22 November 1972) is the bishop of Roman Catholic Diocese of Sibolga in Indonesia. He was appointed by Pope Francis on 6 March 2021 to succeed Ludovikus Simanullang, who died in 2018. Fransiskus received his episcopal ordination from Ignatius Suharyo Hardjoatmodjo on 29 July 2021.

Catholic Church titles
Preceded by Ludovikus Simanullang	Bishop of Sibolga; 20 May 2021 – present	Incumbent
