= Martinus Dogma Situmorang =

Indonesian Roman Catholic bishop (1946–2019)

Martinus Dogma Situmorang OFMCap
- Diocese of Padang
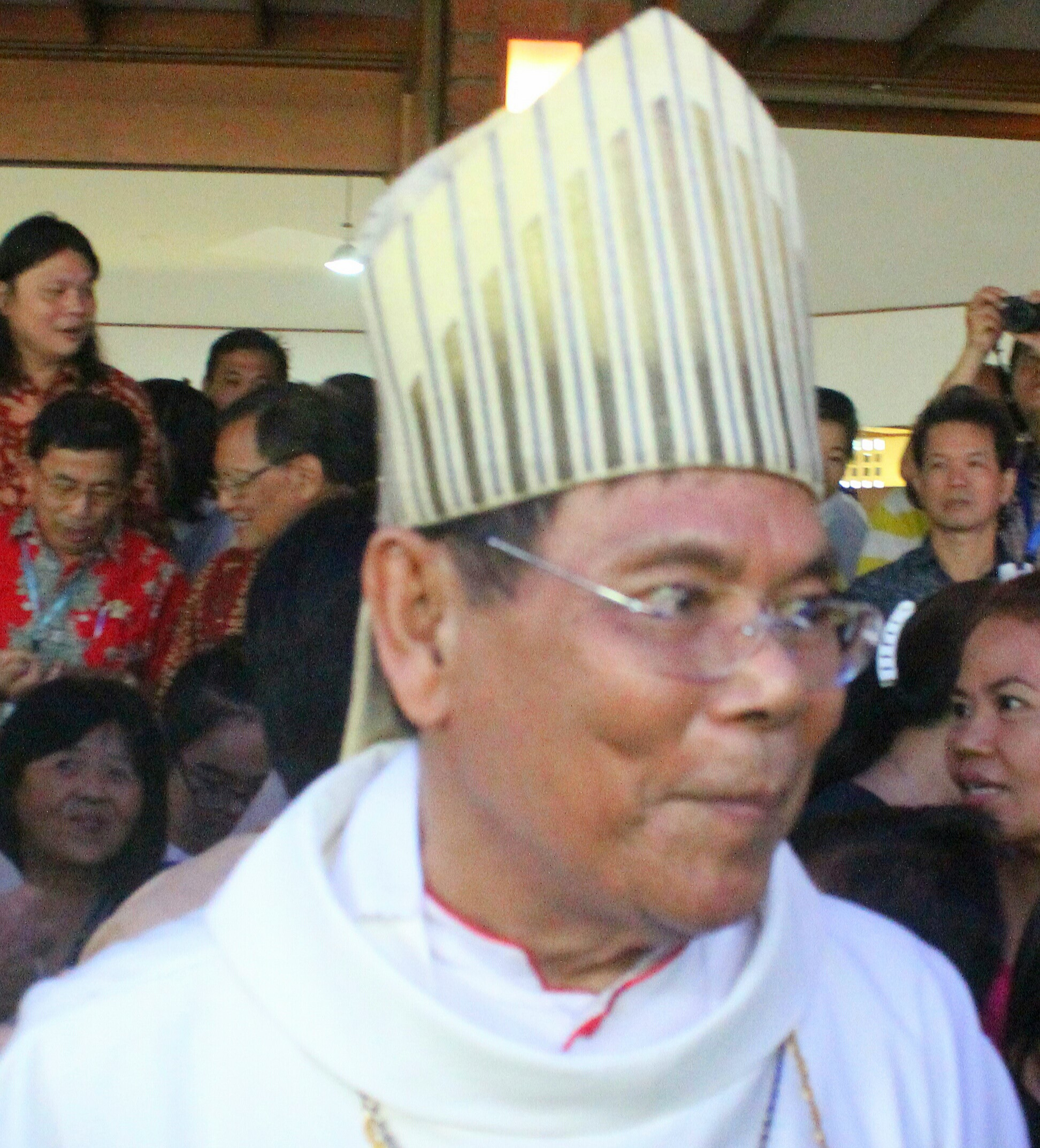
- Situmorang in November 2017
- Church: Roman Catholic Church
- Archdiocese: Archdiocese of Medan
- Diocese: Diocese of Padang
- Predecessor: Raimondo Cesare Bergamin, SX

Orders
- Ordination: 5 January 1974
- Consecration: 11 June 1983 by Alfred Gonti Pius Datubara

Personal details
- Born: 28 March 1946 Palipi, North Sumatra, Indonesia
- Died: 19 November 2019 (aged 73) Bandung, Indonesia
- Denomination: Roman Catholic
- Motto: Fides Per Caritatem Operatur (Faith works through Love)

Martinus Dogma Situmorang OFMCap (28 March 1946 – 19 November 2019) was an Indonesian Roman Catholic bishop.

Dogma Situmorang was born in Indonesia and was ordained to the priesthood in 1974. He served as bishop of the Roman Catholic Diocese of Padang, Indonesia, from 1983 until his death in 2019.

== Early life ==
Dogma Situmorang was born in the village of Palipi on Samosir Island to an ethnic Batak family. He was the third child of the couple Joseph Iskandar Arminius Situmorang and Maria Dina Sinaga. His father was a Roman Catholic catechist who was one of the forerunners in the foundation of the Catholic church on the Samosir Island. On 26 December 1958, when he was 12, Dogma Situmorang's birth mother Maria died and his father remarried to Maria Else Sinaga. In total Dogma Situmorang grew up in a large family with 8 brothers and 6 sisters.

== Religious life ==
When he was in his early twenties Dogma Situmorang joined the Capuchins. On 5 January 1974 at the age of 27 he was ordained a priest. On 11 June 1983 Situmorang was appointed to be bishop of Padang. On 17 March 1983 he was ordained bishop by Alfred Gonti Pius Datubara OFMCap then archbishop of Medan, who served as consecrator. The principal co-consecrators were Raimondo Cesare Bergamin SX, then bishop emeritus of Padang, and Anicetus Bongsu Antonius Sinaga OFMCap, then bishop of Sibolga.

Dogma Situmorang died on 19 November 2019 in a hospital in Bandung. He had been taken in ill on 8 November 2019.
