= Ahmet Özhan =

Turkish singer, conductor, and actor

Ahmet Şükrü Kadıöz
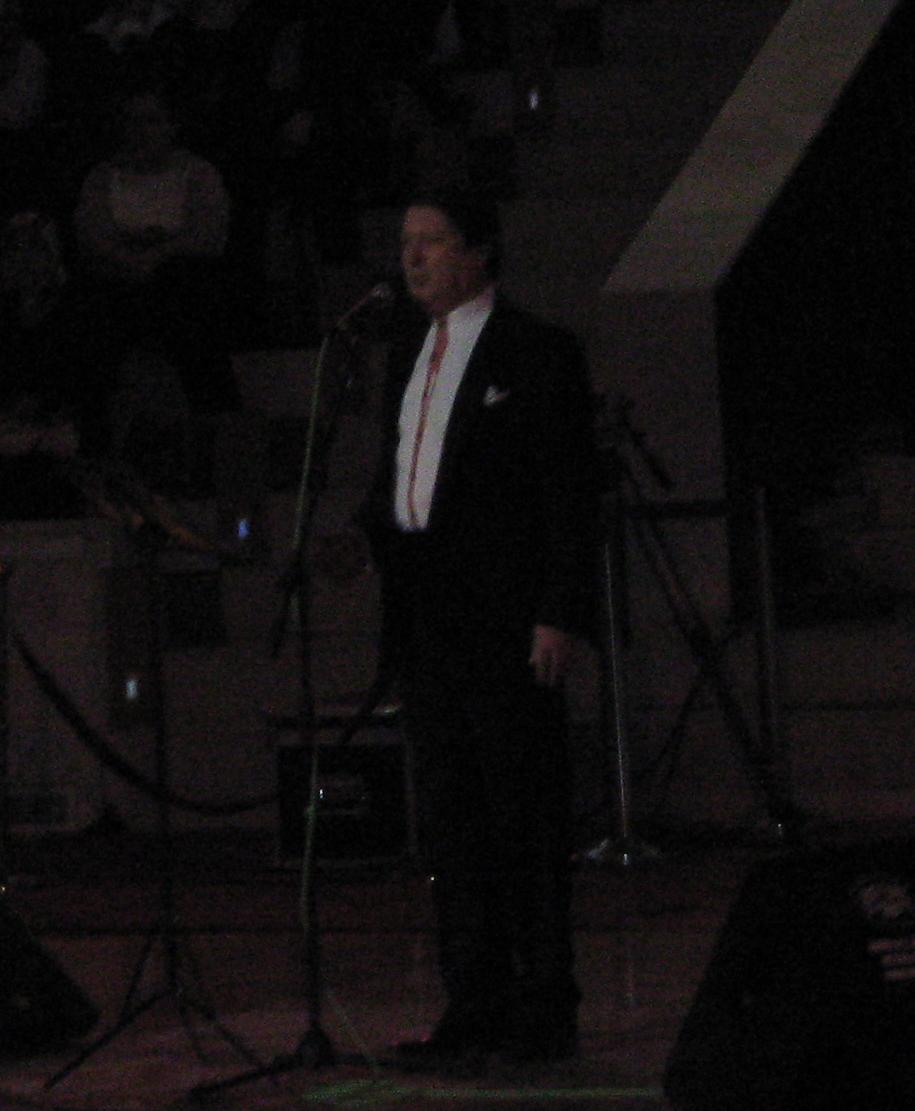
- Ahmet Şükrü Kadıöz performing in 2009

Background information
- Born: August 26, 1950 (age 75); Şanlıurfa, Turkey
- Origin: Üsküdar, Istanbul, Turkey
- Genres: Turkish classical music, tasavvuf music
- Occupation: Singer • Conductor • Actor
- Instruments: Vocals
- Years active: 1968–present
- Labels: Kervan Plak, Uzelli Kaset, Çınar Müzik, Ateş Müzik, Erol Köse, Fon Müzik, Marşandiz International, Müyada Müzik, İstanbul Organizasyon, Akustik Müzik
- Website: www.ahmetozhan.com.tr

Ahmet Şükrü Kadıöz (born August 26, 1950) known by his stage name Ahmet Özhan, is a prominent Turkish classic music singer, conductor, and actor. He represented Turkey at the 1985 ABU Popular Song Contest.

== Early life ==
Ahmet Şükrü Kadıöz was born on August 26, 1950 in Şanlıurfa, Turkey. His father, Nazmi Bey, was a police officer and his mother, Emine Hanım, was a supportive and caring figure in his early life.

== Discography ==
Albums

- 2016: Ahmet Özhan "Best Off İlahiler"
- 2013: Son Nebi
- 2012: Itri
- 2007: Yüzyılın Şarkıları
- 2005: Mevlana'nın Dilinden
- 2005: Hüzünlü Gurbet
- 2003: Rüya
- 2003: Nostalji
- 1999: Güldeste 3
- 1998: Güldeste 2
- 1988: Gel
- 1987: Hoşgeldin and Geceler Gariplerindir
- 1985: Ömrümün Baharı
- 1984: Hüzün
- 1981: Güneşin Battığı Yerde
- 1978: Geceler Gariplerindir
- 1977: Bir Tanem
- 1976: Ahmet Özhan 76
- 1975: Günümüzün Sevilen Şarkılrı ile Ahmet Özhan
- 1974: Ahmet Özhan

== Filmography ==
- Sözün Bittiği Yer, 2006
- Gönülden Gönüle, 1987
- Hafız Yusuf Efendi, 1987
- Aliş ile Zeynep, 1984
- Hacı Arif Bey, 1982
- Çaresiz, 1978
- Küçük Bey, 1975
- Bak Yeşil Yeşil, 1975
- Çocuğumu İstiyorum, 1973
