= Jakarta I (electoral district) =

Jakarta Special Capital Region I
- Daerah Khusus Ibukota Jakarta I
- Constituency for the People's Representative Council
- Location of East Jakarta (Numbered 4 on the map)
- Region: 1 city in Jakarta; City: East Jakarta

Current constituency
- Created: 2004; 21 years ago
- Seats: 12 (2004—2009); 6(2009—present)
- Member(s): Mardani Ali Sera (PKS); Anis Byarwati (PKS); Habiburokhman (Gerindra); Putra Nababan (PDI-P); Hasbiallah Ilyas (PKB); Eko Hendro Purnomo (PAN)
- Created from: DKI Jakarta

Jakarta Special Capital Region I (Indonesian: Daerah Khusus Ibukota Jakarta I), abbreviated as DKI Jakarta I, is an electoral district in Indonesia which encompasses of East Jakarta in the Jakarta Special Capital Region. Since 2009, this district has been represented by six members of People's Representative Council (DPR RI).

== Components ==
- 2004–2009: Central Jakarta, East Jakarta, North Jakarta, dan Thousand Islands Regency
- 2009–present: Redistricted into East Jakarta

== List of members ==
The following list is in alphabetical order. Party with the largest number of members is placed on top of the list.

Election	Member	Party	Votes won
2004	Anis Matta	PKS	Closed list
2004	Nursanita Nasution	PKS	Closed list
2004	Rama Pratama	PKS	Closed list
2004	Chufran Hamal	Demokrat	Closed list
2004	Irzan Tanjung	Demokrat	Closed list
2004	Tri Yulianto	Demokrat	Closed list
2004	Effendi Simbolon	PDI-P	Closed list
2004	Soekardjo Hardjosoewirdjo	PDI-P	Closed list
2004	Agung Laksono	Golkar	Closed list
2004	Drajad Hari Prabowo	PAN	Closed list
2004	Suryadharma Ali	PPP	Closed list
2004	Tiurlan Basaria Hutagaol	PDS	Closed list
2009	Hayono Isman	Demokrat	73,989
2009	Tri Yulianto	Demokrat	83,773
2009	Saifudin Donodjoyo	Gerindra	7,614
2009	Adang Ruchiatna	PDI-P	19,079
2009	Ahmad Zainuddin	PKS	46,179
2009	Andi Anzhar Cakra Wijaya	PAN	18,294
2014	Achmad Fauzan Harun	PPP	50,323
2014	Ahmad Zainuddin	PKS	50,474
2014	Asril Tanjung	Gerindra	24,957
2014	Bambang Wiyogo	Golkar	45,617
2014	Dwi Astuti Wulandari	Demokrat	20,434
2014	Wiryanti Sukamdani	PDI-P	30,691
2019	Anis Byarwati	PKS	39,935
2019	Mardani Ali Sera	PKS	155,285
2019	Putra Nababan	PDI-P	101,769
2019	Sondang Tampubolon	PDI-P	36,185
2019	Eko Hendro Purnomo	PAN	104,564
2019	Habiburokhman	Gerindra	76,028
2024	Anis Byarwati	PKS	64,304
2024	Mardani Ali Sera	PKS	176,584
2024	Putra Nababan	PDI-P	105,559
2024	Hasbiallah Ilyas	PKB	80,895
2024	Eko Hendro Purnomo	PAN	93,673
2024	Habiburokhman	Gerindra	96,914

== See also ==
- List of Indonesian national electoral districts
