= Suzanne Goddard =

Her Honour Judge Suzanne Goddard KC
- Born: 26 September 1963
- Alma mater: Wrekin College; University of Manchester
- Occupation: Lawyer, judge
- Position held: recorder (2002–), King's Counsel (2008–), circuit judge (2015–)

Suzanne Hazel Read Goddard, KC (born 26 September 1963) is a British judge.

She took A levels at Wrekin College and a degree in law at the University of Manchester.

She was a member of Lincoln House Chambers, where she commenced pupillage in 1986. She became a recorder in 2002, a QC in 2008 (which became King's Counsel (KC) in 2022 upon the death of Queen Elizabeth II), and a circuit judge, on the Northern Circuit, in May 2015.

Notable cases over which she presided include the 2020 trial of the serial rapist Reynhard Sinaga.

She was defence barrister for television presenter Fred Talbot in 2015.
