= Christian Democratic Party Indonesia =

Political party in Indonesia

The Christian Democratic Party (Partai Kristen Demokrat, PKD), is a defunct Indonesian Christian Democratic political party founded in 2005. The party attempted to participate in the Indonesian 2009 election. The party managed to fulfill the administrative requirement but failed to fulfill the public support requirement.

The party initiator and founder is Sonny Wuisan (Secretary-General). Their leader and the founder is Tommy Sihotang.

In 2012, the party is disbanded and joined another Christian party, the Prosperous Peace Party.
