= Anis Byarwati =

Indonesian politician (born 1967)

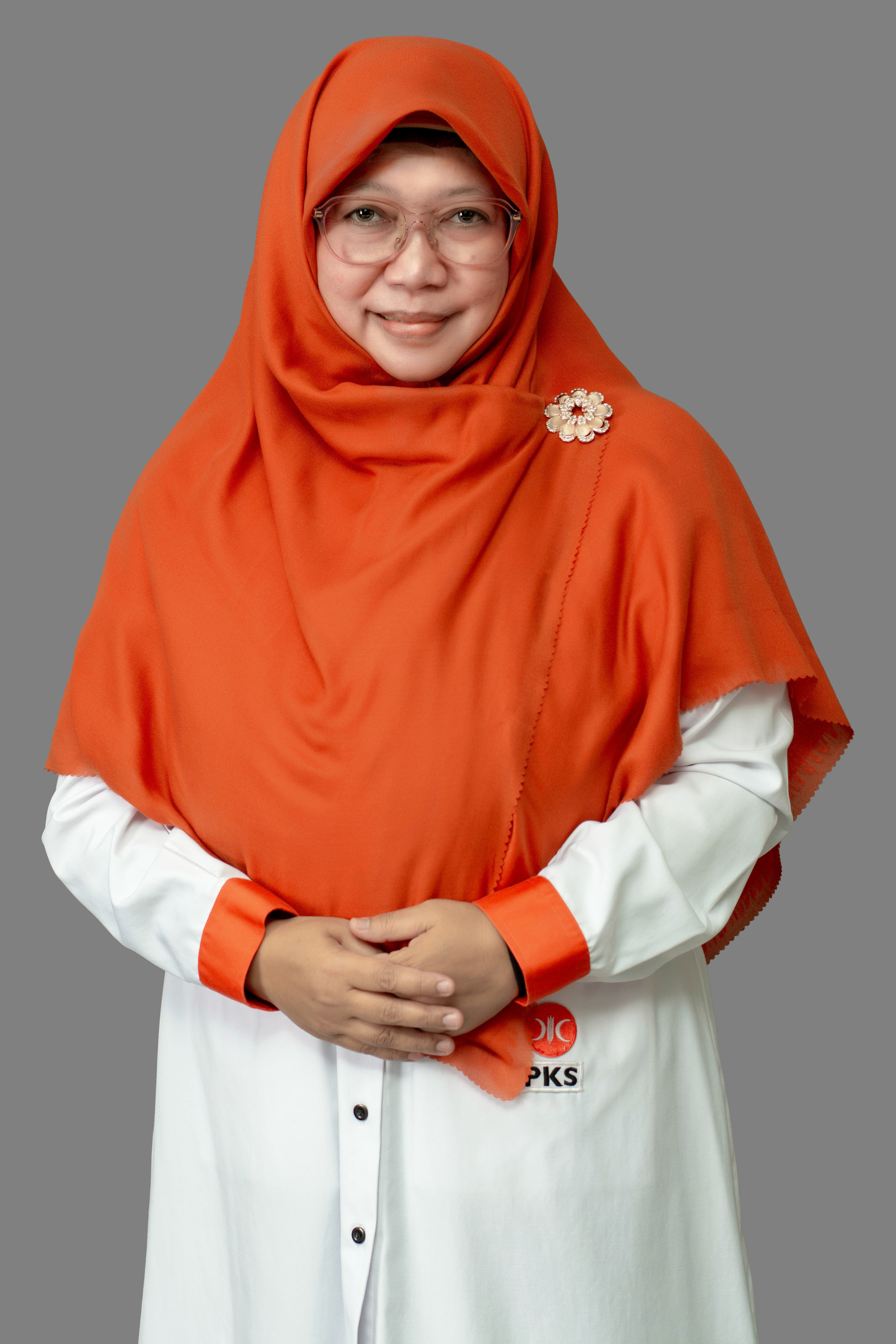

Member of the House of Representatives
- Incumbent
- Assumed office 1 October 2019
- Constituency: Jakarta I

Personal details
- Born: 9 March 1967 (age 59) Surabaya, East Java, Indonesia
- Party: PKS
- Education: STAI Al-Hikmah Jakarta; University of Indonesia; Airlangga University

Anis Byarwati (born 9 March 1967) is an Indonesian politician of the Prosperous Justice Party who has served in the House of Representatives representing Jakarta's 1st electoral district since 2019.

== Early life and education ==
Anis Byarwati was born on 9 March 1967 in Surabaya as a premature baby. At the age of 3, Anis' parents along with her grandparents moved to Jakarta, and she began her education there. After high school, she studied for a bachelors in Islamic da'wah, a masters in Middle Eastern studies at the University of Indonesia, and eventually received a PhD in Islamic Economics from Airlangga University in 2012.

== Career ==
After graduating from Airlangga, Anis began to lecture at YARSI University in Jakarta, teaching management starting in 2013. The following year, she was appointed dean of YARSI's economic faculty from 2013 until 2017, when she became secretary of the postgraduate school. She took part in the Prosperous Justice Party (PKS), serving as chairman of the party's women arm between 2010 and 2015.

In the 2019 legislative election, under PKS, Anis ran for a seat representing Jakarta's 1st electoral district i.e. East Jakarta. She won 39,935 votes and secured a seat. She is part of the legislature's eleventh commission on finance and banking, and as part of the commission she has promoted sharia banking. PKS had named her as one of the party's prospective candidates for the 2024 Jakarta gubernatorial election.

She eventually ran for a second term, and was re-elected in 2024 with 64,304 votes.

== Personal life ==
She married Muhammad K. Renwarin in 1989, and the couple has eight children, one of them is Wildan Kautsar Renwarin a.k.a. Idang.
