= Habiburokhman =

Indonesian politician (born 1974)

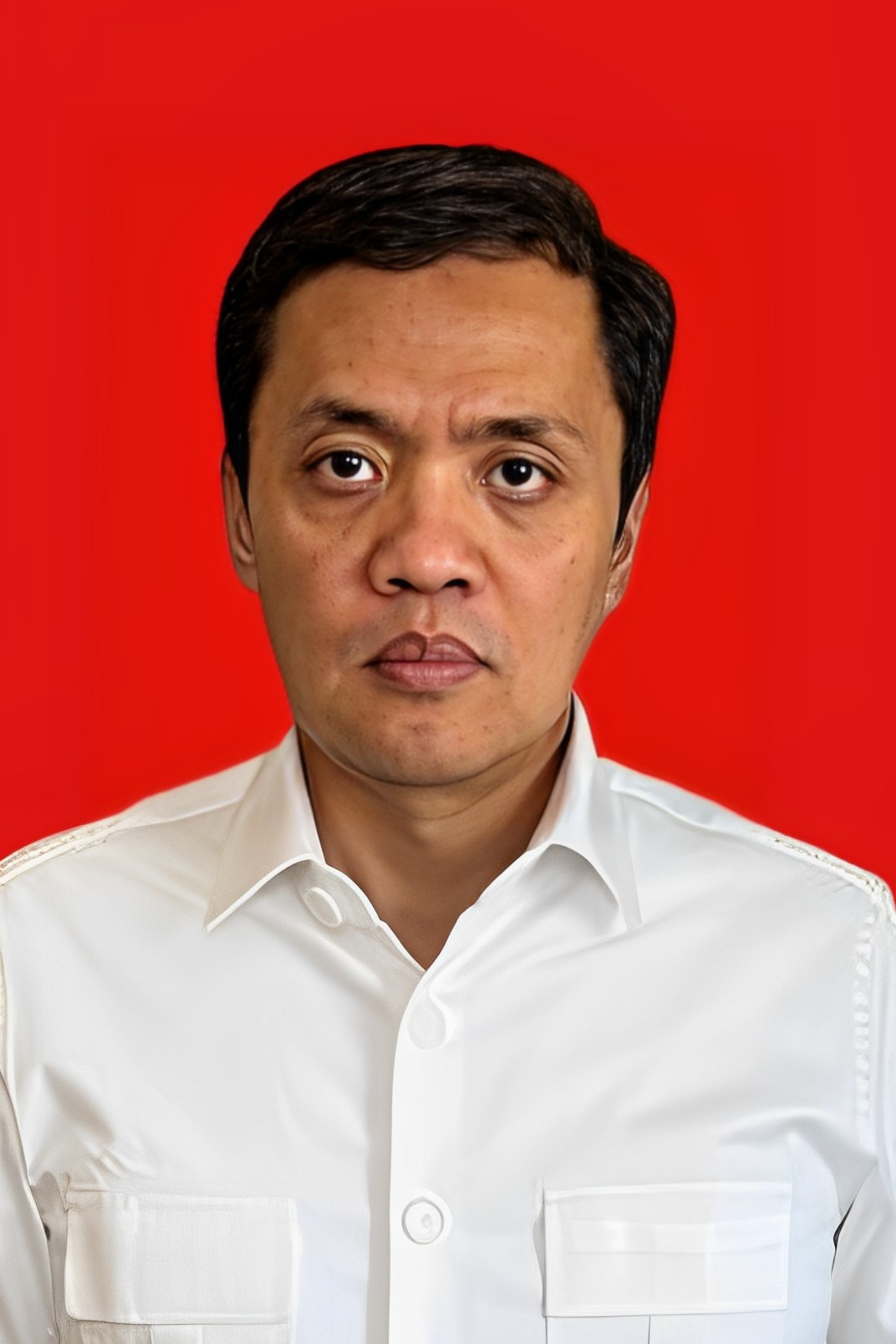

Member of the House of Representatives
- Incumbent
- Assumed office 1 October 2019
- Constituency: Jakarta I

Personal details
- Born: 17 September 1974 (age 52) Metro, Lampung, Indonesia
- Party: Gerindra
- Spouse: Sari Maria Jayani
- Education: Lampung University (S.H.); University of Indonesia (M.H.); Sebelas Maret University (Dr.)

Habiburokhman (born 17 September 1974) is an Indonesian lawyer and politician of the Gerindra Party who has served as a member of the House of Representatives since 2019 representing Jakarta I district. Prior to his election into the council, he was active in the 2014 and 2019 presidential campaigns of Prabowo Subianto, and the gubernatorial campaigns of Joko Widodo and Anies Baswedan in Jakarta.

== Early life and education ==
Habiburokhman was born in the city of Metro, in Lampung, on 17 September 1974. He remained in Lampung throughout most of his studies, graduating from a middle school in Metro and a high school in Bandar Lampung before enrolling at Lampung University, obtaining a bachelors and a masters in law. He later obtained a doctorate in law from Sebelas Maret University in Surakarta in 2022.

=== Name ===
Habiburokhman (Arabic:حبيبو رخمان, romanized: Habibu Rakhman) is a name derived from the Arabic words Habib and Ar-Rahman, one of the Names of God in Islam. Therefore, it carries the meaning "Friend of The Merciful", also spelled Habiburrahman.

== Legal career ==
He founded an advocacy office, Habiburokhman & Co., in Menteng, Jakarta.

== Political career ==
Habiburokhman joined Gerindra Party in 2010, and in 2012, he led an advocacy group which successfully campaigned for Joko Widodo's 2012 gubernatorial campaign. He then took part in Prabowo Subianto's 2014 presidential campaign as the campaign's advocacy director. In the leadup to the 2017 Jakarta gubernatorial election, Habiburokhman campaigned for the Anies Baswedan-Sandiaga Uno ticket, through the Advokat Cinta Tanah Air (ACTA) organization. In 2016, with Baswedan's primary competitor, incumbent governor Basuki Tjahaja Purnama campaigning for an independent ticket requiring one million ID cards, Habiburokhman made a public bet that he would "jump from the top of Monas" should Basuki succeed in collecting the ID cards. Habiburokhman later was lawyer for a slander case on behalf of demonstrators in November 2016, when Basuki stated in an ABC interview that the demonstrators were paid.

Along with ACTA, Habiburokhman filed a suit at the Constitutional Court of Indonesia in July 2017, requesting a judicial review of the electoral law of 2017. In particular, the suit challenged the presidential threshold clause in the law, which required a minimum number of political support for a presidential candidate to be approved. The suit was eventually rejected, the court citing that the clause was already in place for the 2014 presidential election. For the 2019 presidential election, Habiburokhman was a spokesperson for Prabowo's presidential campaign.

=== House of Representatives ===
Following the 2019 legislative election, Habiburokhman was elected into the People's Representative Council from the Jakarta I district, winning 76,028 votes as the only Gerindra legislator from the district. Speaking to journalists, he remarked that he spent over Rp 1 billion (~USD 70,000) to campaign. He was sworn in as a legislator on 1 October 2019. Within the council, he was assigned to the Third Commission, later being appointed its deputy chairman following the 2023 death of Desmond Junaidi Mahesa. He was reelected for a second term in the 2024 election with 96,914 votes.

Within Gerindra, Habiburokhman is a deputy chairman for the 2020–2025 tenure.
