= Fred Talbot =

Scottish TV presenter and convicted sex offender

- Born: Frederick Wilson Talbot; 17 December 1949 (age 76); Edinburgh, Scotland
- Education: North Cestrian Grammar School, Altrincham
- Occupations: Teacher; presenter; meteorologist
- Years active: 1984–2012
- Employer: ITV (Granada Television)
- Known for: Granada Reports; This Morning
- Criminal charge: Ten counts of indecent sexual assault
- Criminal penalty: Nine years and eight months' imprisonment
- Criminal status: Released on licence

Frederick Wilson Talbot (born 17 December 1949) is a British former television presenter and convicted sex offender. He was born in Scotland, and grew up in north west England.

== Early life and teaching ==
Born in Edinburgh, his father was from Liverpool and his mother was Scottish. Talbot moved to Cheshire in 1957 and grew up there, where he attended North Cestrian Grammar School in Altrincham, Cheshire. In 1964 he was a founding member of the Altrincham and District Astronomical Society, with which he co-discovered a meteor shower, the June Lyrids in June 1966.

After teacher training in Gateshead in the late 1960s, he was employed to teach biology at Altrincham Grammar School for Boys until May 1984, when his schooling career came to "an abrupt end" following an indecent proposal he made to two pupils at his home.

== Media career ==
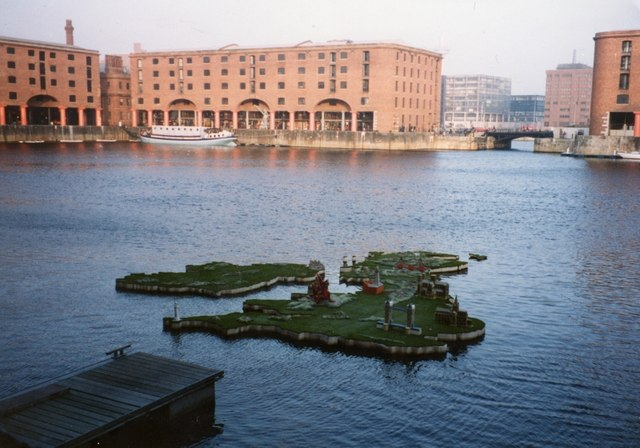
The 'weather map' at Liverpool Docks that Talbot used as a weather presenter on This Morning

Talbot began working for Granada Television in 1982, with The Final Frontier, an educational science series networked on ITV as part of their children's programming strand. In 1984, he began presenting for the regional news programme Granada Reports in North West England. He continued as a regular reporter for Granada Reports and became a weatherman for the ITV's This Morning in October 1988.

Until production of This Morning was moved from the Albert Dock, Liverpool, to London, Talbot presented weather reports from a large floating map of the UK and Ireland in the dock. He was required to jump across a gap to go back and forth between Britain and the island of Ireland. Crowds often gathered to watch his leap. On one occasion in 2004, a diver swam near the map to distract Talbot and on another a streaker swam naked up to the map and jumped on.

Talbot also presented several regional feature series for ITV Granada, including Locks and Quays and Wainwright Country before returning to weather presenting with Granada Reports in February 2009. He also contributed to the CITV science series Prove It! and guest presented weather forecasts for the ITV Breakfast programme Daybreak.

== Indecent assault convictions ==
In December 2012, Greater Manchester Police carried out a search of Talbot's home in Bowdon, when allegations first emerged of abuse at Altrincham Grammar School between the early 1970s and early 1980s. A day before the search, Talbot posted on his Twitter account that he was on a holiday cruise in the Atlantic Ocean.

He did not return to his role at ITV Granada upon his return to the UK, but he was not suspended.

In April 2013, police arrested Talbot, who refused to answer interview questions about allegations by men who claimed they had been abused as children. Following a re-arrest in December 2013, he was charged with ten historical sexual offences, followed by an eleventh charge for a further sexual assault in June 2014.

His trial began in January 2015, accused of abusing four former pupils at Altrincham Grammar School and a fifth schoolboy from the Newcastle area, during an annual holiday in the 1970s. He was defended by Suzanne Goddard QC. Witnesses included Stone Roses lead singer Ian Brown, a former pupil of Talbot's at Altrincham Grammar School for Boys, who swore under oath that Talbot showed his class gay pornographic films. Evidence was also provided by Talbot's extensive diaries, which noted his sexual activity. On 13 February 2015, a jury at Minshull Street Crown Court in Manchester found Talbot guilty of indecent assault against two teenage boys at the school, and acquitted him of eight further charges. Immediately remanded in custody bearing in mind Talbot's "abuse of trust", sentencing was adjourned until 13 March 2015. With reporting restrictions lifted, it was noted that a number of similar complaints against Talbot had since been passed by police to the procurator fiscal about alleged offences said to have been committed in Scotland. During the trial, Talbot said he knew at fourteen that he was homosexual.

At Minshull Street Crown Court on 13 March 2015, Judge Timothy Mort sentenced Talbot to five years in prison. Talbot was told that he would serve at least two-and-a-half years in prison before being considered for release on licence.

Talbot appeared in a Scottish court on 11 March 2016, where he faced ten fresh charges of indecent assault dating from 1968 to 1981 and two charges of breach of the peace. He did not enter a plea during the hearing. In May 2017, Talbot was convicted of seven charges of indecent assault against boys that took place on trips to Scotland while he was a teacher at Altrincham Grammar. On 15 June 2017, he was sentenced to four years' imprisonment at Lanark Sheriff Court, to run from 14 August, after he had served half of his existing sentence for indecent assault. On 29 November 2017, Talbot was jailed for eight months for a further sexual assault, this time of a male over the age of 16, having admitted the offence at a previous hearing.

Talbot was released from prison in December 2019.

== Awards ==
In 1998, Talbot was named Weatherman of the Year at the Annual International Weather Festival in Paris.

In 2007, Talbot was awarded the honorary degree of Doctor of Science by Manchester Metropolitan University in recognition of bringing to a mass audience a better understanding of scientific and environmental issues.
