= Hayono Isman =

Indonesian politician

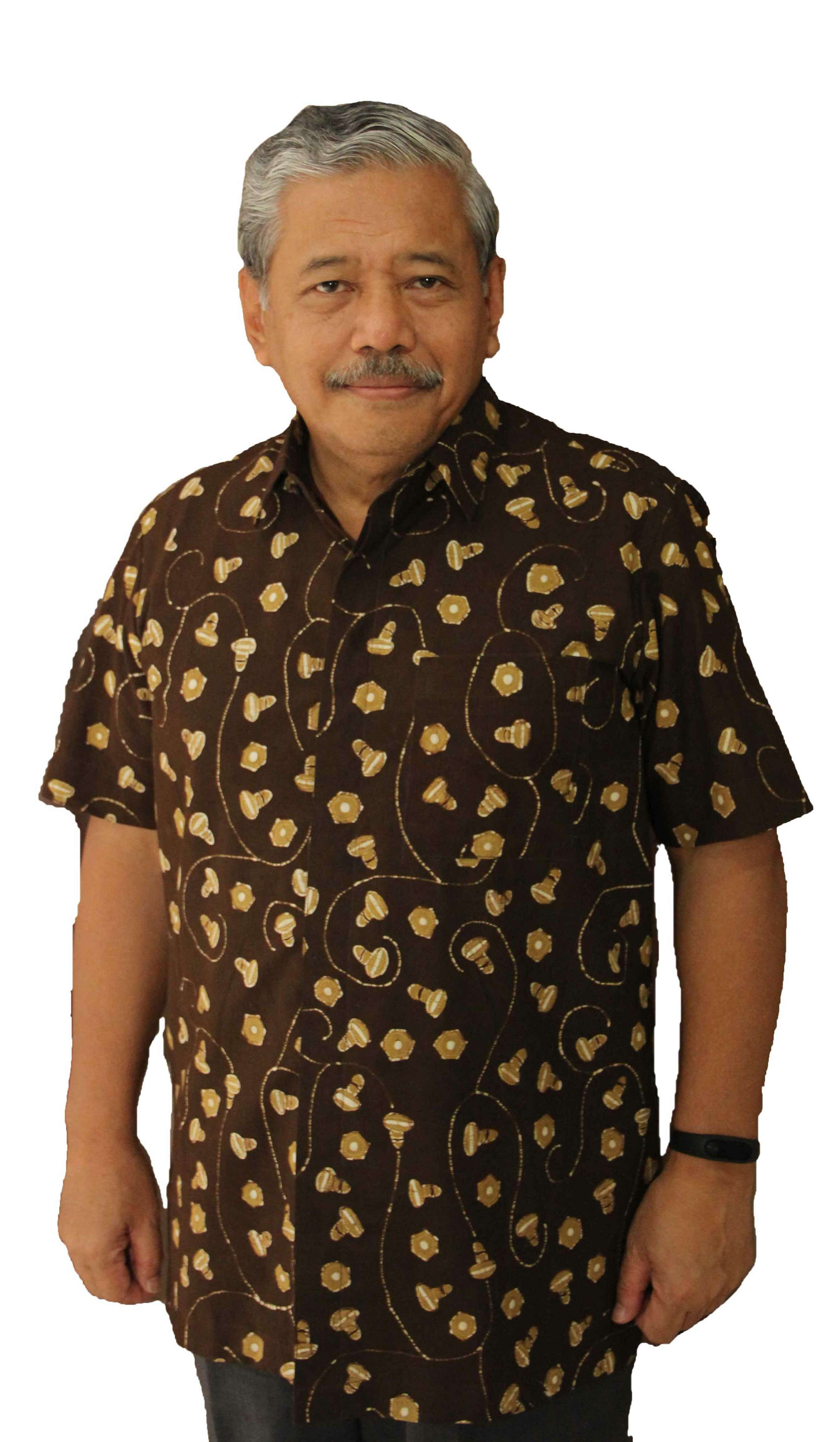

6th State Minister for Youth and Sports
- In office 17 March 1993 – 16 March 1998
- President: Suharto
- Preceded by: Akbar Tanjung
- Succeeded by: Agung Laksono

Member of the House of Representatives
- In office 1 October 2009 – 30 September 2014
- Constituency: Jakarta I
- In office 1 October 1987 – 17 March 1993
- Succeeded by: Herman Widyananda
- Constituency: East Java

Personal details
- Born: 25 April 1955 (age 71) Surabaya, Indonesia
- Party: Nasdem (since 2017)
- Other political affiliations: Golkar (1987–1998); PKP (1998–2003); Democratic (2003–2016)
- Spouse: Poppy Puspitasari
- Relations: Hayani Isman (sister)
- Children: 3
- Parent: Mas Isman (father)
- Education: Sekolah Tinggi Ilmu Pemerintahan Abdi Negara Jakarta

Hayono Isman (born 25 April 1955) is a senior figure within Indonesian politics. He was a member of the People's Representative Council, representing Jakarta's 1st electoral district, between 2009 and 2014.

Isman was born in Surabaya, East Java. Elected to the Indonesian parliament twice, he was the Indonesian minister for sports from 17 March 1993 until 16 Match 1998.

In March 2010 he met with members of the British House of Lords who they praised Indonesia's progress in democracy, media freedom and environmental protection.
