= Brecé =

- Commune
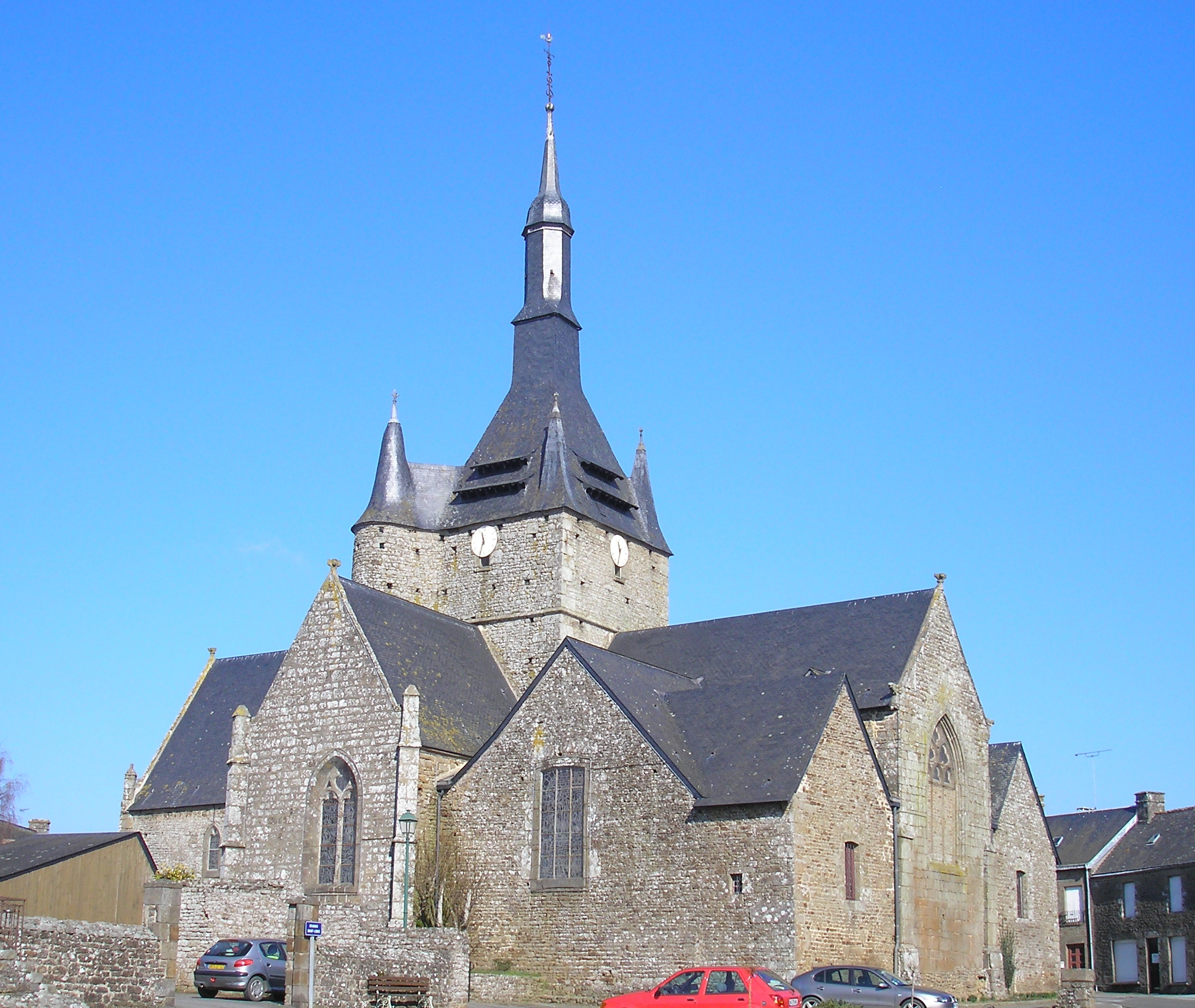
- The Church of Our Lady of the Assumption
- Location of Brecé
- Location within France Location within Pays de la Loire
- Coordinates: 48°23′56″N 0°47′22″W
- Country: France
- Region: Pays de la Loire
- Department: Mayenne
- Arrondissement: Mayenne
- Canton: Gorron

Government
  - Mayor (2020–2026): Paul-Edouard Marquer
- Area^{1}: 35.27 km^{2} (13.62 sq mi)
- Elevation: 210 m (690 ft)
- Highest elevation: 211 m (692 ft)
- Lowest elevation: 116 m (381 ft)
- Population (2023): 821
  - Density: 23.3/km^{2} (60.3/sq mi)
- Time zone: UTC+01:00 (CET)
  - Summer (DST): UTC+02:00 (CEST)
- INSEE/Postal code: 53042 /53120
- ^{1} French Land Register data, which excludes lakes, ponds, glaciers > 1 km^{2} (0.386 sq mi or 247 acres) and river estuaries.

Brecé (French pronunciation: [bʁəse]) is a commune in the Mayenne department in northwestern France.

== Population ==
Historical population
Year	Pop.	±% p.a.
1968	1,125	—
1975	1,050	−0.98%
1982	971	−1.11%
1990	865	−1.43%
1999	830	−0.46%
2007	832	+0.03%
2012	824	−0.19%
2017	824	+0.00%
2023	821	−0.06%
Source: INSEE

== Notable people ==
- Gérard Moussay (1932–2012), Catholic missionary

== See also ==
- Communes of Mayenne
