= Eko Patrio =

Indonesian comedian

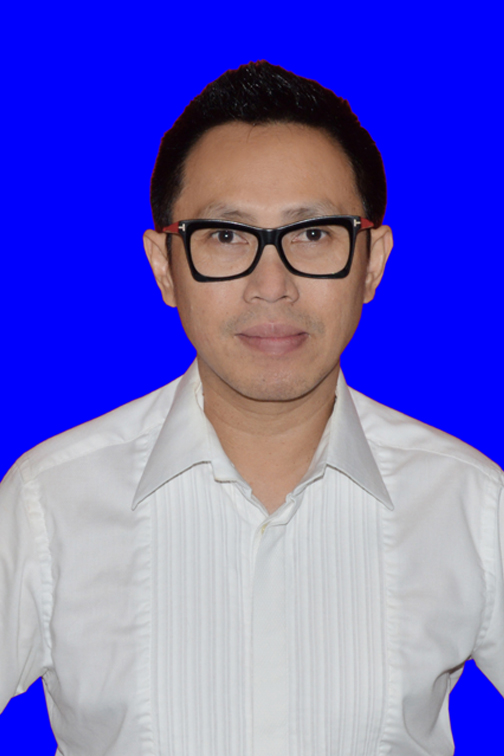

Member of the House of Representatives
- Incumbent
- Assumed office 1 October 2009
- Constituency: East Java VIII (2009–2019); Jakarta I (2019–present)

Personal details
- Born: Eko Hendro Purnomo; December 30, 1970 (age 55) Tanjunganom, Indonesia
- Party: PAN

Eko Hendro Purnomo (born 30 December 1970), better known as Eko Patrio, is an Indonesian politician and entertainer. He is member of the House of Representatives, having served since 2009 representing East Java VIII (2009-2019) and Jakarta I (2019–2025). He was later indefinitely suspended from this position in 2025 alongside fellow PAN party member Uya Kuya [id] in relation to posting a parody video which was considered mocking public concerns, sparking tensions and anger in the build-up towards the August 2025 Indonesian protests.

Prior to entering politics, he was active as a comedian within the Patrio group.

== Early life ==
Eko Hendro Purnomo was born on 30 December 1970 in Loceret, Nganjuk. He studied journalism at the Institute of Social and Political Science, Jakarta, graduating in 1997.

== Career ==
=== Outside politics ===
While studying in high school, Eko alongside two friends Tejo and Jejen founded a comedy group named Seboel. The group gained some success, featuring on radio shows and allowing Eko to meet several high-profile entertainers such as the Warkop group. When Tejo and Jejen left the group, Eko enlisted new members Akri and Taufik Savalas, but eventually disbanded the group when Savalas left to become a solo entertainer. He founded a new group Patrio with Akri and Parto in 1994. The group achieved national fame through the comedy show Ngelaba, which was aired on the TPI channel for over a decade.

Outside of his entertainment career, Eko also owns cafes, salons, printing, advertising, and publishing companies.

=== Politics ===
Eko has been involved in politics since 2005, and was active in various entertainers' associations. In the 2009 Indonesian legislative election, Eko ran as a candidate for the People's Representative Council as part of the National Mandate Party (PAN), in East Java's 8th electoral district. He ran a grassroots campaign, visiting markets and holding entertainment events. Eko's popularity was seen to have improved PAN's performance in the electoral district, where the party qualified for a number of municipal council seats despite failing to win any in 2004. While Eko qualified for a seat, the Supreme Court of Indonesia nullified a number of legislative candidates including Eko. However, the General Elections Commission refused to apply the ruling retroactively, and thus Eko was unaffected. He was sworn in for his first term on 1 October 2009, and stated that he would donate his first month's salary to victims of the 2009 Sumatra earthquakes. He was reelected in 2014 from the same district with around 64 thousand votes. For the 2019 legislative election, Eko moved to Jakarta's 1st electoral district, and won his third term. He was reelected from Jakarta I in 2024.

In the legislature, Eko is part of the sixth commission which covers industry, investment, and business competition for the 2019–2024 term. He was in the fourth commission in 2014–2019. Eko has endorsed subsidies for low-cost housing, and criticized subsidies for electric vehicles, stating that the government should instead increase funding for public transportation or agriculture.

According to Eko, while he was well-known from his entertainment career, he was mostly known under his stage name Eko Patrio instead of his legal name Eko Hendro Purnomo. A significant effort in his campaigning was to familiarise his constituents with his legal name, which was written on the ballot paper.

== Personal life ==
Eko married actress Viona Rosalina in 2001, and the couple have three children.
