= Mas Isman =

Indonesian diplomat

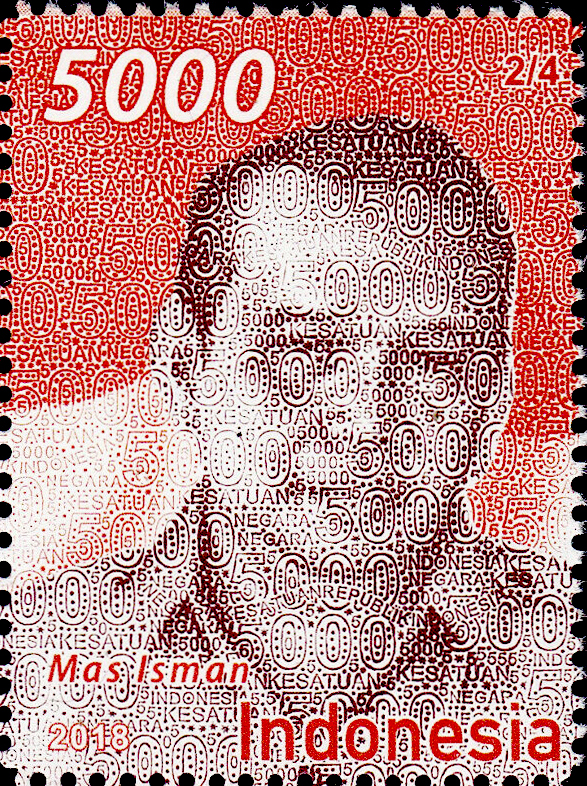
- Mas Isman on a 2018 stamp of Indonesia

Personal details
- Born: 1 January 1924 Bondowoso, East Java
- Died: 12 December 1982 (aged 58) (Indonesia) Surabaya, East Java
- Awards: National Hero of Indonesia

Military service
- Allegiance: Indonesia
- Branch/service: Indonesian Army
- Rank: Mayor General
- Battles/wars: Indonesian National Revolution

Mas Isman (1 January 1924 –12 December 1982) was an Indonesian freedom fighter in East Java when it was part of the Dutch East Indies. He was posthumously given the National Hero of Indonesia award by President Joko Widodo on 5 November 2015.

Mas Isman was the father of Hayono Isman, a former Minister of Youth and Sports Affairs in Indonesia.
