= Diocese of Sibolga =

Roman Catholic diocese in North Sumatra, Indonesia

Diocese of Sibolga Dioecesis Sibolgaensis Keuskupan Sibolga

Location
- Country: Indonesia
- Ecclesiastical province: Medan
- Metropolitan: Medan

Statistics
- Area: 26,413 km^{2} (10,198 sq mi)
- Population: Total; Catholics: (as of 2010); 2,407,080; 205,390 (8.5%)

Information
- Rite: Latin Rite
- Cathedral: Cathedral of St. Therese of Lisieux in Sibolga
- Co-cathedral: Cathedral of The Lady of All Nations in Gunungsitoli

Current leadership
- Pope: Leo XIV
- Bishop: Fransiskus Tuaman Sasfo Sinaga
- Metropolitan Archbishop: Kornelius Sipayung

Website
- Website of the Diocese

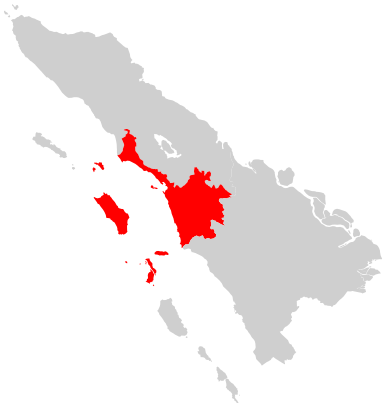
Diocese of Sibolga in the Province of Medan

The Roman Catholic Diocese of Sibolga (Latin: Sibolgaen(sis)) is a diocese located in the city of Sibolga in the ecclesiastical province of Medan in Indonesia.

== History ==
- 17 November 1959: Established as the Apostolic Prefecture of Sibolga from the Apostolic Vicariate of Medan
- 24 October 1980: Promoted as Diocese of Sibolga

== Leadership ==
- Bishops of Sibolga (Roman rite)
  - Bishop Fransiskus Tuaman Sinaga (6 March 2021 – present)
  - Bishop Ludovikus Simanullang, OFMCap (14 March 2007 – 20 September 2018)
  - Bishop Anicetus Bongsu Antonius Sinaga, OFMCap (later Archbishop) (24 October 1980 – 3 January 2004)
- Prefects Apostolic of Sibolga (Roman Rite)
  - Fr. Anicetus Bongsu Antonius Sinaga, OFMCap (later Archbishop) (1978 – 24 October 1980)
  - Bishop Peter G. Grimm, OFMCap (17 November 1959 – 1971)
