= Reynhard Sinaga =

Indonesian convincted serial rapist in the UK (born 1983)

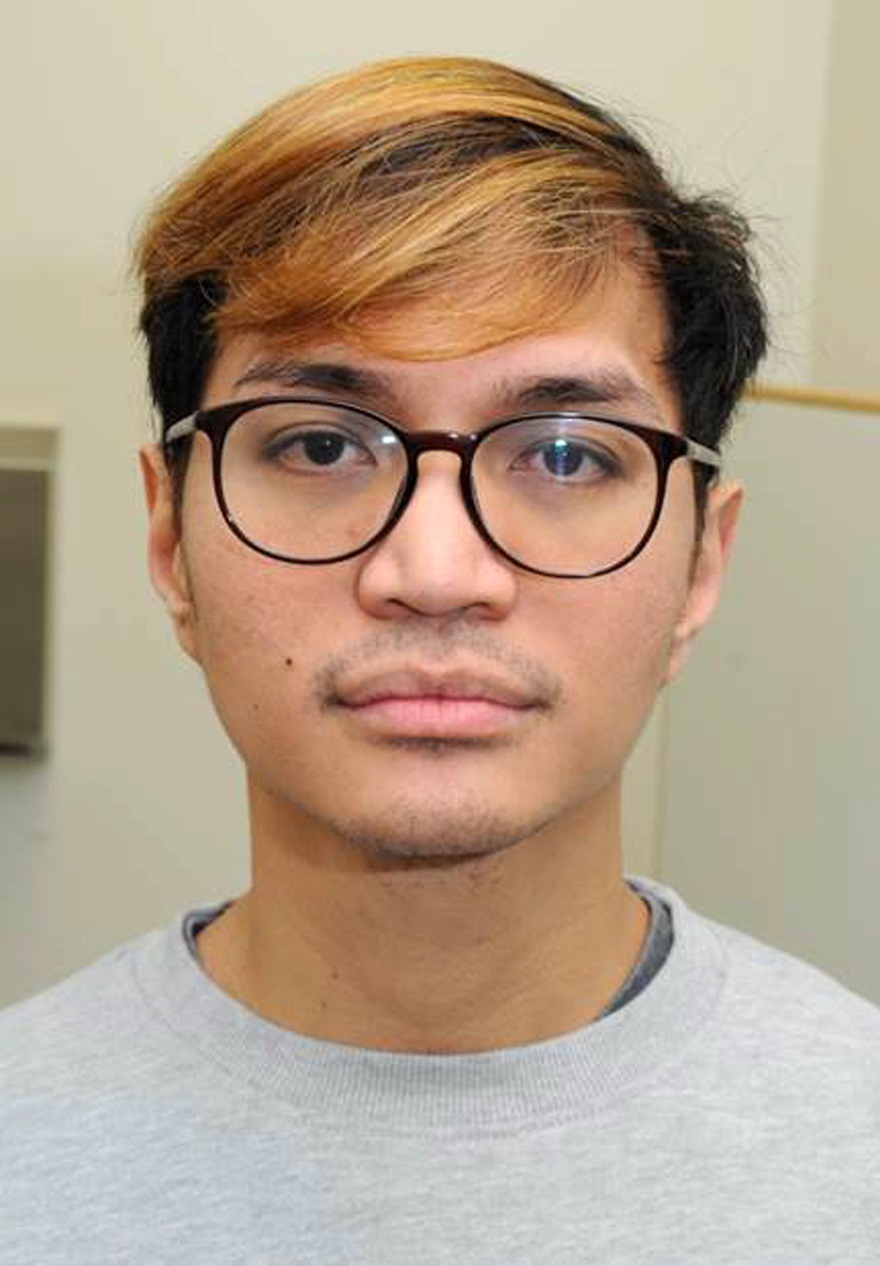
- Sinaga's police mugshot, 2020
- Born: Reynhard Tambos Maruli Tua Sinaga; 19 February 1983 (age 43); Jambi City, Jambi, Indonesia
- Education: University of Indonesia (BArch); University of Manchester (MSc, MA); University of Leeds
- Convictions: Rape, sexual assault, attempted rape and assault by penetration of 48 men
- Penalty: 88 concurrent life sentences, with a non-parole period of 40 years

Details
- Victims: 136–206+
- Span of crimes: 2015–2017
- Imprisoned at: HM Prison Wakefield

Reynhard "Rey" Tambos Maruli Tua Sinaga (Note: Under Indonesian law, a full name is a single personal name with no legal distinction for any family names or inherited names. Indonesian and Indonesian language sources formally refer to the individual by the first element of his name, "Reynhard" whilst sources based in Western countries, including English-language British sources, formally refer to the individual by the final element of his name, "Sinaga". Additionally, English-language publications from Singapore refer to him as "Sinaga". "Sinaga" is his marga, or clan name.) (born 19 February 1983) is an Indonesian serial rapist. He was convicted of 159 sex offences, including 136 rapes of young men, committed in Manchester, England, between 2015 and 2017, where he was living as a student. Sinaga was found guilty of drugging and sexually assaulting 48 men during this period, 44 of whom he raped, some repeatedly, although police believe he was offending for years beforehand. Sinaga was prosecuted in four trials between 2018 and 2020 and was given concurrent life sentences with a minimum term of 30 years, raised to 40 years in December 2020 by the Court of Appeal. The Crown Prosecution Service described Sinaga as being the most prolific rapist in British legal history.

Sinaga is believed by police to have raped or assaulted at least 206 men since 2015, which includes the two years before his arrival in the UK. In Manchester, he waited for potential victims outside nightclubs, pubs and similar venues in the early hours. He then offered his victims a stay at his flat, subsequently drugging and raping them. After some of the assaults, Sinaga boasted about his actions on WhatsApp.

Since his trial, Sinaga has been imprisoned at HM Prison Wakefield, although talks over his repatriation to Indonesia began in 2025.

== Background ==
Reynhard Sinaga was born on 19 February 1983 in the Indonesian city of Jambi and grew up in Depok, West Java. Growing up in an affluent conservative Christian family, Sinaga is ethnically from the Batak people. After completing a degree in Architecture at the Faculty of Engineering of the University of Indonesia in Depok in 2006, he moved to the UK on a student visa and began to study in August 2007 at the University of Manchester, where he completed an MSc in urban planning in 2009 and an MA in sociology in 2011.

Remaining in Manchester, Sinaga began to study for a PhD at the University of Leeds in 2012, which he did not complete. His thesis, entitled Sexuality and everyday transnationalism among South Asian gay and bisexual men in Manchester, was submitted in August 2016 and was assessed as a "fail", but he was permitted to amend and resubmit it. Sinaga was rewriting his thesis at the time of his arrest. He was financially supported by his father, a banker who moved into the palm oil sector. His mother came to the first pre-trial hearing but was not present for any of the four trials. While in Manchester, Sinaga lived openly as a gay man, living not far from Manchester's gay village, and reportedly had many boyfriends.

== Attacks ==
Sinaga lived in a flat in central Manchester which acted as a base for his assaults. He would wait for men leaving nightclubs and bars before leading them to his flat, often offering them somewhere to have a drink or call a taxi. Giving them a drugged drink, believed to have been spiked with GHB, Sinaga would then assault the victims while they were unconscious and video the attack with a mobile phone. He rarely used condoms when penetrating his victims; despite this, he was found negative for sexually transmitted infections upon his arrest.

At the time his sentence was announced in January 2020, almost all of Sinaga's victims were known to have been heterosexual young men, with three exceptions. He saw "turning" heterosexual men as a sport. Of one victim in January 2015, who had argued with his girlfriend in the Factory nightclub near Sinaga's home, he told a WhatsApp group: "SuperRey saves straight boys from their monstrous girlfriend."

In June 2017, his last victim, an 18-year-old amateur rugby union player, regained consciousness during the rape, fought off his attacker, and reported the incident to the police. Sinaga was badly beaten and hospitalised, while police initially arrested his victim on suspicion of grievous bodily harm. Subsequent examination of Sinaga's iPhone by the police led to the discovery of more than 3 terabytes of digital video evidence of his assaults and rapes. Many of his victims were traceable because Sinaga kept their phones, watches, ID cards, etc., and he had used social media to contact his unknowing victims online. Some victims unwittingly accepted his friend requests on Facebook. Although the earliest case to be tried in courts stems from 2015, police believe Sinaga began the attacks in 2005, two years before he arrived in the UK.

== Offences and legal proceedings ==
Sinaga's earliest established offence occurred on New Year's Day, 2015. The man was heterosexual, like the majority of Sinaga's victims, and could remember nothing when he awoke the next day in his abuser's flat covered in vomit. Because of the false concern from Sinaga, he (like many others) apologised for imposing on his host before leaving; he had been raped twice.

Sinaga pleaded 'not guilty' to all charges made against him, resulting in his victims having to endure relating evidence in court, as well as the videos being shown to the jurors and others present at the trials. In his defence, he claimed to have been playing sex games, with the other man playing dead to fulfill his fantasies. He claimed that the encounters were consensual, a claim found to be false as victims were heard snoring in the videos.

Sinaga attended St Chrysostom's Church, a liberal congregation of the Church of England, and the church provided Sinaga with a character reference for his trial. The presiding judge, Suzanne Goddard, remarked during the sentencing of the second trial that "It is almost beyond belief that someone who could profess some Christian faith could at the same time have been committing such wicked and evil crimes." The St Chrysostom's Church later distanced itself from Sinaga after his conviction.

The four trials took place as follows:

• 1 June – 10 July 2018 (re : 13 victims)
• 1 April – 7 May 2019 (re : 12 victims)
• 16 September – 4 October 2019 (re : 10 victims)
• December 2019 (re : 13 victims)

The four trials encompass 48 named victims out of at least 206 Sinaga is believed to have raped while they were unconscious. Police have been unable to trace 70 of his victims.

Sinaga was convicted of 136 counts of rape, 14 counts of sexual assault, eight counts of attempted rape, and one count of assault by penetration. His defence barrister said that he could offer no mitigation. In the first two trials, he was given 88 concurrent life sentences with a minimum 30-year term before being considered for parole. This was raised to 40 years by the Court of Appeal on 11 December 2020. Reporting restrictions were in place until the conclusion of his last trial, after which his crimes were made public for the first time. Detectives subsequently set up a hotline with the expectation that dozens of new victims could come forward. Sinaga was originally held at HMP Strangeways and reported as refusing to cooperate with investigators. He was moved to HM Prison Wakefield in April 2020, several months after his final trial.

On 16 January 2020, Sinaga's case was referred to the Court of Appeal for being too lenient. Geoffrey Cox was reported as saying a "whole life order" should be considered for Sinaga, meaning he would never be eligible for parole. While a whole life order has never been imposed for crimes other than murder, Judge Suzanne Goddard QC considered this option when sentencing Sinaga and said that he should never be released. In her summing up, Goddard commented: "In my judgment, you are a highly dangerous, cunning, and deceitful individual who will never be safe to be released, but that is a matter for the Parole Board." Sinaga’s earliest date of eligibility for a parole board hearing is 2060, when he will be 77 years of age.

== Aftermath ==
Sinaga's father, Saibun Sinaga, in an interview with BBC Indonesia, expressed his opinion a day after the sentencing, where he was quoted as saying that "we accept the verdict. His punishment fits his crimes. I don't want to discuss the case any further."

Sinaga's mother, Normawati Silaen, told The Sunday Times in 2020 that when she visited him in hospital in 2017 she had "wondered if [Sinaga's final victim] had made up the story". She stated that she was not aware that he was gay: "We are a good Christian family who do not believe in homosexuality. He is my baby."

The charity Safeline reported a record increase in calls to its hotline for male sexual abuse survivors in the aftermath of the case. Duncan Craig, founder of Survivors Manchester, the charity supporting several of Sinaga’s victims, stated that it had started a national conversation regarding men opening up about sexual abuse.

After Sinaga's conviction, the mayor of his hometown of Depok, Mohammad Idris, announced that he planned to order raids on the local LGBT community. The announcement was swiftly condemned by human rights activists saying that conservatives in Indonesia were using Sinaga as an excuse to target the gay community in the country.

The publicity of his crimes brought attention to the Sinaga clan and surname, especially due to the practice of formally referring to someone by their surname in Anglophone countries. Members of the clan distanced themselves from him and denounced his actions as "[bringing] shame to the clan".

Whilst incarcerated at HM Prison Wakefield for his life sentence, Sinaga was allegedly attacked by another inmate, Jack McRae, on 4 July 2023. In February 2025 Indonesia began talks with the UK to repatriate him. Yusril Ihza Mahendra, Indonesia’s senior minister for law and human rights affairs said that talks with the British government "were at an early stage." If the British government accepts the request, Mahendra said Sinaga would be imprisoned in an Indonesian maximum-security prison to serve his life sentence.

== See also ==
- List of serial rapists
- Zhenhao Zou
- 1995 Okinawa rape incident
