= Manampin Girsang =

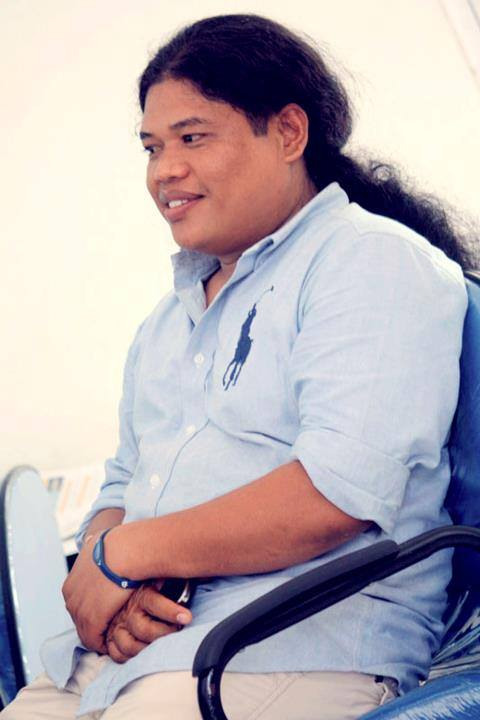
- Manampin Girsang
- Born: 13 May 1969 (age 56); Brastagi, North Sumatra, Indonesia
- Education: University of Indonesia
- Occupation: Entrepreneur
- Employer: PT. Gabe International
- Known for: Entrepreneur, author

Manampin Girsang (born in Brastagi, on 13 May 1969), widely known by his nickname, Pipin, is an Indonesian entrepreneur and author from Brastagi, North Sumatera, Indonesia. He founded PT Gabe International, an export-focused furniture company, in 1991.

== Childhood and early career ==
When he was a child, his father, who worked in the national electricity company PT PLN, wanted Pipin to be an engineer. He was sent to an engineering high school in Brastagi. After he graduated, he continued his education at the Faculty of Engineering, at the University of Indonesia. Yet, as he was more interested in language and literature, he chose to drop out and move to Bali in 1989.

Equipped with his ability to speak English, he tried to find a job in Bali. Sometimes, he also worked part-time as a tourist guide. A mutual friend then introduced him to an Italian entrepreneur named Giovanni, who soon became his friend and mentor. Giovanni asked Pipin to sell his product, a brand of bikini. He mainly sold the product in Kuta Beach but was then arrested and confiscated as he was not a member of the local seller association.

After the incident, Giovanni asked Pipin to build a new venture that buys and sells antiquities. Pipin agreed and suggested that they focus on selling antique furniture. Giovanni then gave him a camera and funds to find the antiquities in Jepara and Madura. Pipin completed the task and sold the items in Bali. At the time, he received 10% from the sales as his commission.

== PT Gabe International ==
Satisfied by his work, Giovanni invested more funds for Pipin. He sent Pipin Rp.30.000.000 to build a workshop in Jepara, a small town that was popular for its furniture and handicrafts. Giovanni also gave him some freedom to find buyers beside him.

He named his company Gabe International in 1991. The company's name "Gabe" came from the name of an angel in his religion, Gabriel. "Gabe" can also mean "be it" in Batak language. He mainly sells his product through digital means, including using websites and social media. In 2014, the company started to penetrate the domestic market. Most notably by supplying furniture for Ngurah Rai Airport, Bali, and several hotels in the area.

== See also ==
- Jepara
- Furniture
- Indonesia
