= Diana Nasution =

Indonesian singer

- Born: 5 April 1958; Medan, North Sumatra, Indonesia
- Died: 4 October 2013 (aged 55); Jakarta, Indonesia
- Occupation: Singer
- Years active: 1970 – 2013
- Spouse: Minggus Tahitoe (m. 1978-2013; her death)
- Children: 4

Diana Nasution (5 April 1958 – 4 October 2013), was an Indonesian singer.

Nasution represented Indonesia at the 1986 ABU Popular Song Contest.
