= Diocese of Padang =

Roman Catholic diocese in West Sumatra, Indonesia

Diocese of Padang Dioecesis Padangensis Keuskupan Padang
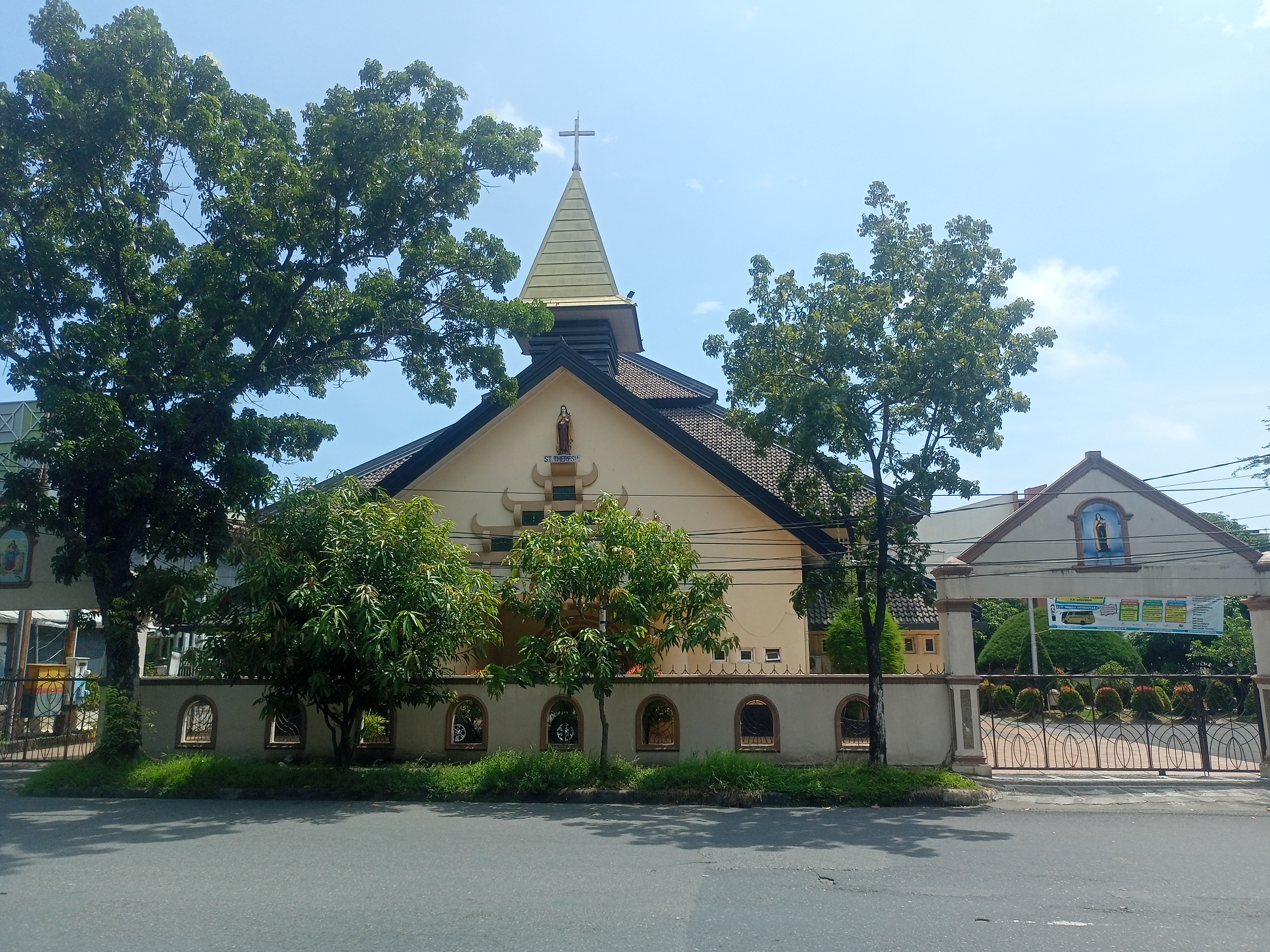

Location
- Country: Indonesia
- Ecclesiastical province: Medan
- Metropolitan: Medan

Statistics
- Area: 132,959 km^{2} (51,336 sq mi)
- Population: Total; Catholics: (as of 2004); 9,153,000; 73,000 (0.8%)

Information
- Rite: Latin Rite
- Cathedral: Cathedral of St Therese in Padang

Current leadership
- Pope: Leo XIV
- Bishop: Vitus Rubianto Solichin
- Metropolitan Archbishop: Kornelius Sipayung, O.F.M. Cap.

The Roman Catholic Diocese of Padang (Latin: Padangen(sis)) is a diocese located in the city of Padang in the ecclesiastical province of Medan in Indonesia.

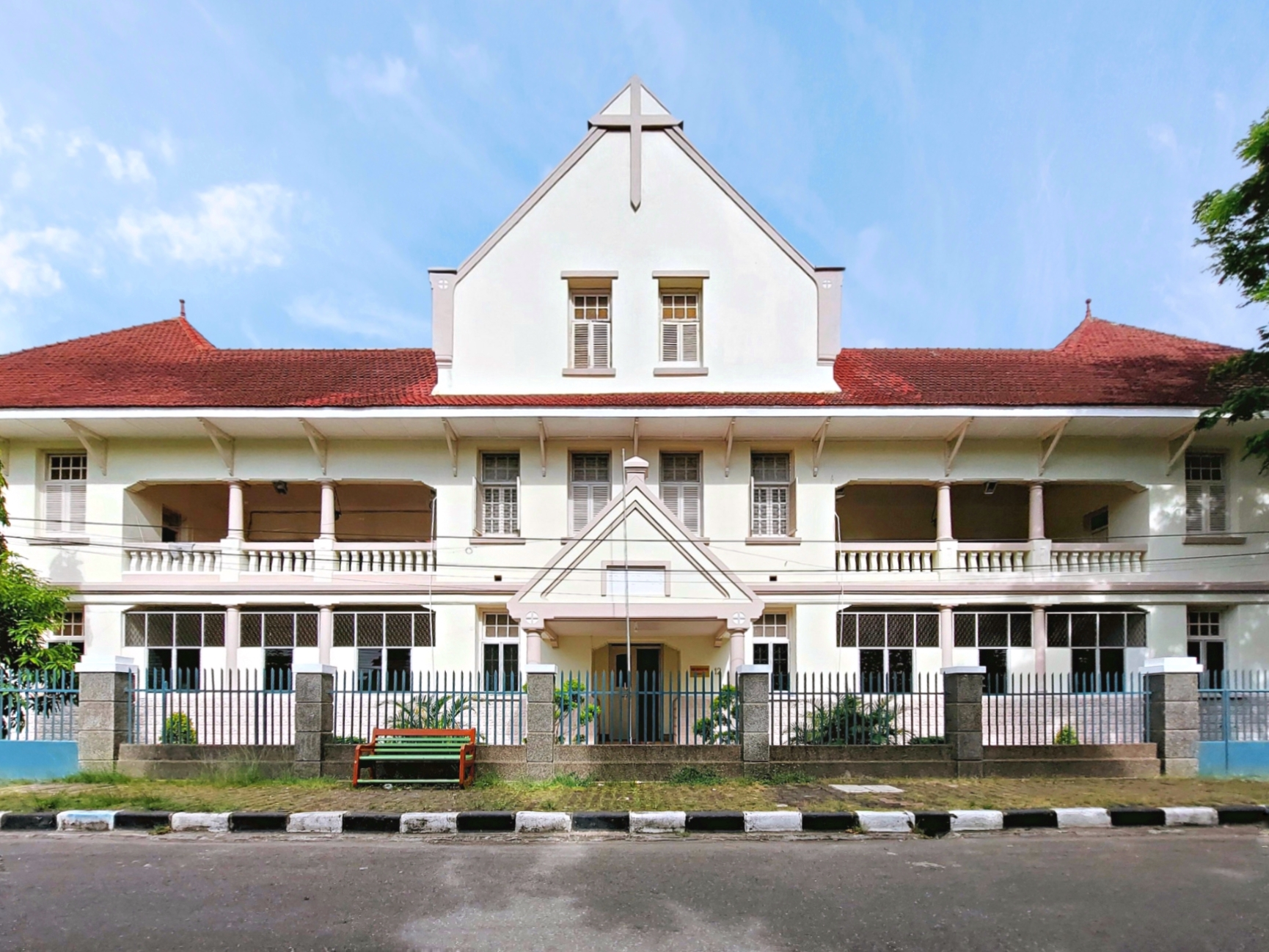
Episcopal Palace in Padang

== History ==
- 19 June 1952: Established as the Apostolic Prefecture of Padang from the Apostolic Vicariate of Palembang
- 3 January 1961: Promoted as Diocese of Padang

== Leadership ==
- Bishops of Padang (Roman rite)
  - Bishop Vitus Rubianto Solichin, S.X. (3 July 2021 – present)
  - Bishop Martinus Dogma Situmorang, O.F.M. Cap. (17 March 1983 – 19 November 2019)
  - Bishop Raimondo Cesare Bergamin, S.X. (16 October 1961 – 17 March 1983)
- Prefects Apostolic of Padang (Roman Rite)
  - Fr. Pascal de Martino, S.X. (27 June 1952 – 1961)
