= Kornelius Sipayung =

21st-century Indonesian Catholic bishop

Kornelius Sipayung OFM Cap
- Archbishop of Medan
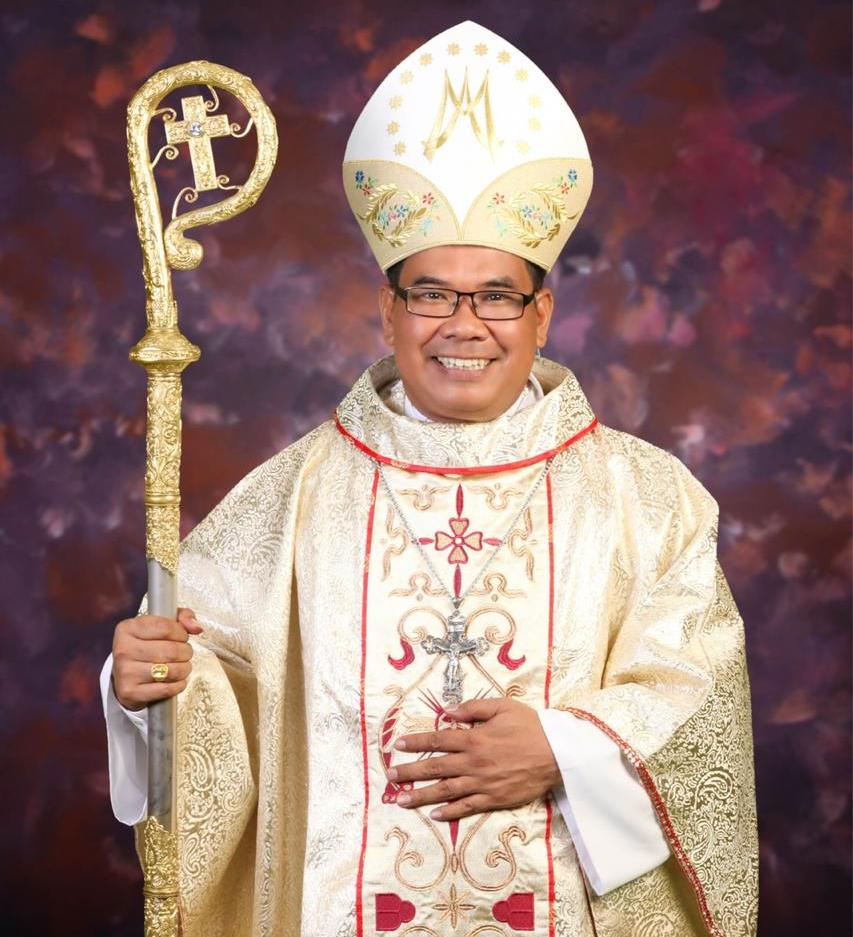
- Church: Roman Catholic Church
- Archdiocese: Archdiocese of Medan
- Predecessor: Anicetus Bongsu Antonius Sinaga

Orders
- Ordination: 11 December 1999 by Alfred Gonti Pius Datubara
- Consecration: 2 February 2019 by Piero Pioppo

Personal details
- Born: 26 August 1970 (age 56) Bandar Hinalang-Kabanjahe, North Sumatra
- Denomination: Roman Catholic
- Education: Pontifical Gregorian University, Rome
- Motto: Deus Meus et Omnia

Kornelius Sipayung, OFM Cap (born 26 August 1970) is the Archbishop of Roman Catholic Archdiocese of Medan.

Sipayung was born in Bandar Hinalang-Kabanjahe, North Sumatra, Indonesia. He attended Christus Sacerdos Minor Seminary, Pematangsiantar before being ordained to the priesthood on 11 December 1999. He is a member of the Order of Friars Minor Capuchin. In 2002, he studied dogmatic theology at Pontifical Gregorian University in Rome. He served as a lecturer in various theological disciplines at St. John's School of Philosophy and Theology in Pematangsiantar since 2005.

Pope Francis appointed Sipayung as the new Archbishop of Medan to succeed Archbishop Emeritus Anicetus Bongsu Antonius Sinaga, whose resignation was accepted by the Pope on 8 December 2018. Sipayung was ordained as archbishop on 2 February 2019, his principal consecrator being Archbishop Piero Pioppo, Apostolic Nuncio to Indonesia.
