= Tommy Sihotang =

Tommy Sihotang (born 3 December 1957) is an Indonesian lawyer. He is the leader of the Christian Democratic Party Indonesia and is mainly active in Human Rights law.

== Early life and education ==
Shihotang is of Batak descent. He grew up in a Christian family with twelve siblings. He was raised in Pematang Siantar, North Sumatra. Later he moved to the capital city of Indonesia, Jakarta. In 1986, Sihotang received his bachelor's degree in Law (Sarjana Hukum) at Universitas Jaya Baya. Later he moved to Sheffield, England with his wife and two children and obtained his Master's degree (LL.M) in International, Commercial, and European Law at the University of Sheffield in 1999. In 2007, he earned his PhD at Universitas Padjadjaran (Bandung).

== Career ==
Sihotang is the leader of the Indonesian Christian Democratic Party and lectures at Universitas Atma Jaya. Sihotang is the author of two books: "Ketika Komandan Didakwa Melanggar Hak Asasi Manusia" and "Hukum Acara di Pengadilan Hak Asasi Manusia".
