= Charles Bonar Sirait =

Indonesian television presenter

- Born: March 19, 1971 (age 54); Jakarta, Indonesia
- Occupations: Television Presenter; Radio Announcer

Charles Bonar Sirait (born March 19, 1971, at Jakarta) is a professional, public figure and famous television presenter in Indonesia.

== Career ==
He has been in the communication business since 1990.

He became very popular In Indonesia as he started his career as the television host of various well known television programs in Indonesia such as Wheel of Fortune Quiz (Roda Impian) SCTV, Zimfoni Music SCTV (TV network), Intro Music SCTV (TV network), F1 Sports TPI, Bintang Tinju Dunia TPI, Gladiator 1 Milyar Quiz Metro TV, Famous to Famous Metro TV, Touch The Car Metro TV, Telkomania Indosiar, Gebyar BCA Indosiar Tak Tik Boom Quiz RCTI, English Premier League TPI, World Cup 2010 RCTI, Italian League Indosiar, Buka Rahasia RTV (Indonesian TV network), Selamat Pagi Nusantara TVRI, Perfect Numbers O Channel.

Charles received the Panasonic Television Award in the category of Best Male Television Host in the year of 1999, 2000, 2001.

Charles also known as Environment, Climate change, Global Warming, Renewable Energy and Sustainable Development Goals (SDGs) issues activist.

In 2008, Charles wrote a series of Public Speaking books and won an award as Best Selling Book.

His first book entitled "The Power of Public Speaking" became a collection of the South East Asian Studies Cornell University Library, New York, USA in 2009.

He is the Founder of CBS Communications , a strategic communications firm and CBS School of Communications.

He accomplished his undergraduate degree and master's degree from the Faculty of Economics at Atma Jaya Jakarta University, Indonesia.

His role as a 'public figure' 'also brings the presenter of one of alumni of Economics Faculty of Atma Jaya Jakarta University, He was recorded as WWF Indonesia's Earth Hour Environmental Ambassador in 2010 and became an honorary member of the World Wildlife Fund (WWF) for Indonesia since 2007 along with Nirina Zubir, Nadine Chandrawinata, Marcel Chandrawinata. Mischa Chandrawinata, Surya Saputra and Indra Lesmana.

Charles Bonar Sirait is currently pursuing his doctoral degree, majoring in political and public communication.

 #opentowork
