= Sondang Tiar Debora Tampubolon =

Indonesian politician (born 1983)

Sondang Tampubolon
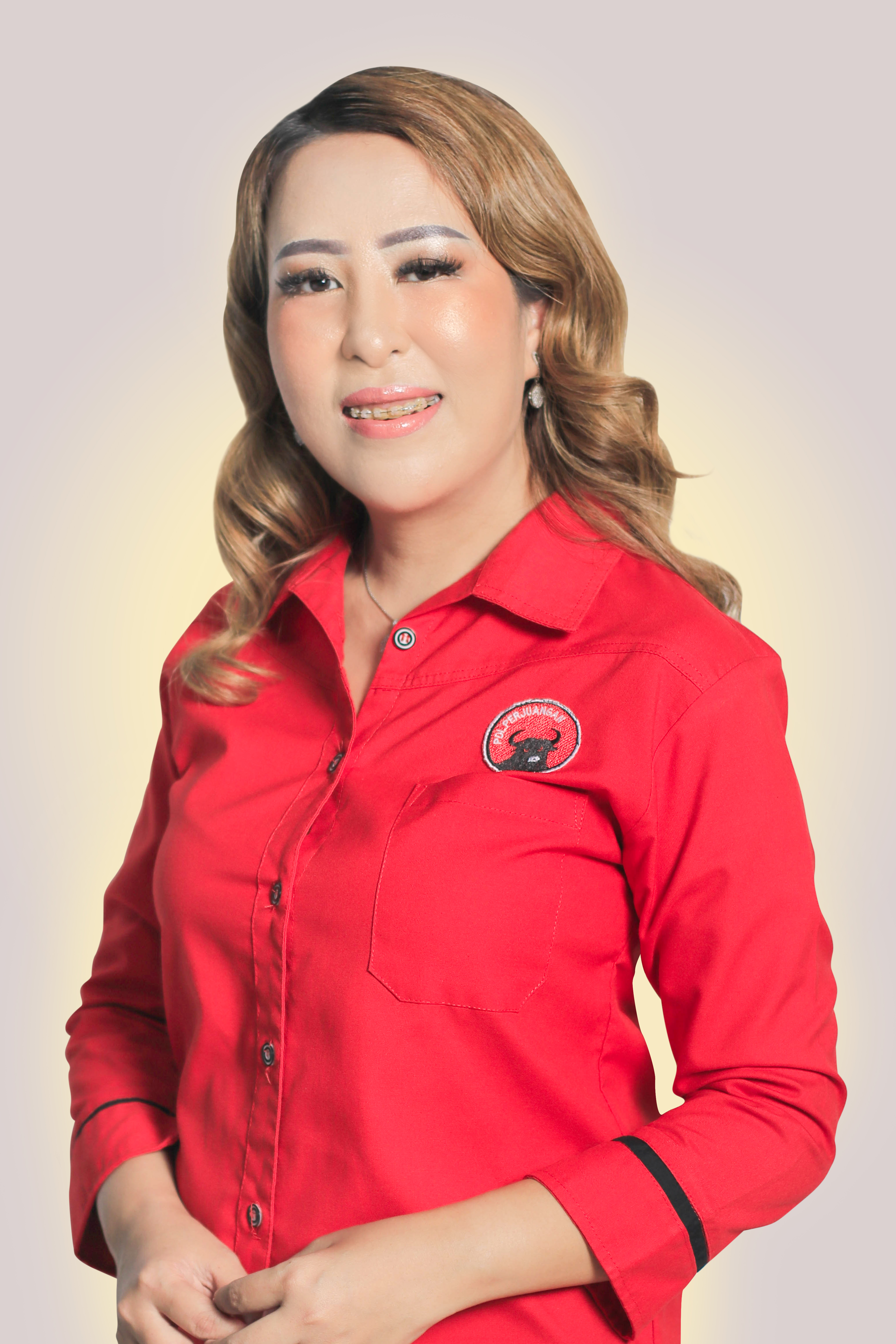

Member of the House of Representatives
- In office 1 October 2019 – 1 October 2024
- Constituency: Jakarta I

Personal details
- Born: Sondang Tiar Debora Tampubolon; 18 November 1983 (age 42) Jakarta, Indonesia
- Party: PDI-P
- Spouse: Gustaf Irianto Siahaan
- Relations: Nurdin Tampubolon (father)
- Children: 2
- Education: Bandung Institute of Technology; University of Indonesia

Sondang Tiar Debora Tampubolon (born 18 November 1983) is an Indonesian politician who is a member of the House of Representatives, representing Jakarta's 1st electoral district (East Jakarta).

== Biography ==
Tampubolon was born in Jakarta on 18 November 1983. She studied in Jakarta, graduating from St. Ursula Catholic School in 2000. She obtained a bachelor's degree in engineering physics from the Bandung Institute of Technology in 2010. She had worked as a manager for a fuel station in Bandung and as a project manager in Cimahi, before joining NT Corp (PT Bangkitgiat Usaha Mandiri) in 2010. By 2014, she had become a commercial director in the company.

She ran as a legislative candidate in Jakarta's 1st electoral district, i.e. East Jakarta, in the 2019 Indonesian legislative election. She was elected as one of two PDI-P legislators in the district after winning 36,185 votes. Tampubolon is part of the legislature's sixth commission. She was not reelected in 2024.
