= Archdiocese of Medan =

Roman Catholic archdiocese in Sumatra, Indonesia

Coordinates: 3.5833°N 98.6667°E

Archdiocese of Medan Archidioecesis Medanensis Keuskupan Agung Medan

Location
- Country: Indonesia
- Ecclesiastical province: Medan

Statistics
- Area: 102,738 km^{2} (39,667 sq mi)
- Population: Total; Catholics: (as of 2004); 14,389,898; 501,079 (3.5%)
- Parishes: 53

Information
- Rite: Latin Rite
- Cathedral: Cathedral of the Immaculate Conception in Medan
- Patron saint: Blessed Denis and Redemptus, martyrs

Current leadership
- Pope: Leo XIV
- Metropolitan Archbishop: Kornelius Sipayung, OFMCap
- Vicar General: Michael Manurung, OFMCap

Website
- Website of the Archdiocese

The Roman Catholic Archdiocese of Medan (Latin: Medanen(sis)) is an archdiocese located in the city of Medan in Sumatra in Indonesia.

== History ==
- 30 June 1911: Established as the Apostolic Prefecture of Sumatra from the Apostolic Vicariate of Batavia
- 27 December 1923: Renamed as Apostolic Prefecture of Padang
- 18 July 1932: Promoted as Apostolic Vicariate of Padang
- 23 December 1941: Renamed as Apostolic Vicariate of Medan
- 3 January 1961: Promoted as Metropolitan Archdiocese of Medan

== Leadership ==
- Archbishops of Medan (Roman rite)
  - Archbishop Kornelius Sipayung, OFMCap (8 December 2018 - now)
  - Archbishop Anicetus Bongsu Antonius Sinaga, OFMCap (12 February 2009 – 7 December 2018 retired)
  - Archbishop Alfred Gonti Pius Datubara, OFMCap (24 May 1976 – 12 February 2009 retired)
  - Archbishop Antoine Henri van den Hurk, OFMCap (3 January 1961 – 24 May 1976)
- Vicars Apostolic of Medan (Roman Rite)
  - Bishop Antoine Henri van den Hurk, OFMCap (later Archbishop) (1 January 1955 – 3 January 1961)
  - Bishop Mattia Leonardo Trudone Brans, OFMCap (23 December 1941 – 1954)
- Vicars Apostolic of Padang (Roman Rite)
  - Bishop Mattia Leonardo Trudone Brans, OFMCap (18 July 1932 – 23 December 1941)
- Prefects Apostolic of Padang (Roman Rite)
  - Bishop Mattia Leonardo Trudone Brans, OFMCap (22 July 1921 – 18 July 1932)
- Prefects Apostolic of Sumatra (Roman Rite)
  - Fr. Liberato da Exel, OFMCap (1916 – 1921)
  - Fr. Giacomo Cluts, OFMCap (1911 – 1916)

== Suffragan dioceses ==
- Padang
- Sibolga

== Sources ==
- GCatholic.org
- Catholic Hierarchy
