= Alfred Gonti Pius Datubara =

Indonesian Catholic bishop (1934–2025)

Mgr Alfred Gonti Pius Datubara OFM Cap
- Archbishop Emeritus of Medan
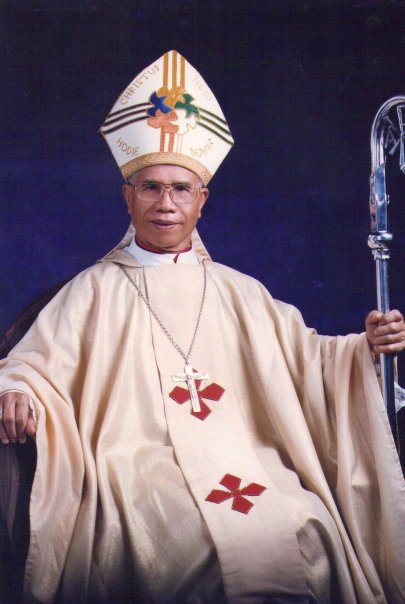
- Church: Roman Catholic Church
- Archdiocese: Medan
- Appointed: 24 May 1976
- Term ended: 12 February 2009
- Predecessor: Antoine Henri van den Hurk
- Successor: Anicetus Bongsu Antonius Sinaga
- Previous posts: Capuchin priest (1964–1975); Auxiliary Bishop of Medan and Titular Bishop of Novi (1975–1976)

Orders
- Ordination: 22 February 1964 by Antoine Henri van den Hurk, OFM Cap
- Consecration: 24 May 1976 by Justinus Darmojuwono, Antoine Henri van den Hurk, OFM Cap and Raimondo Cesare Bergamin, S.X.
- Rank: Archbishop

Personal details
- Born: 12 February 1934 Lawe Bekung, Atjeh, Dutch East Indies
- Died: 17 October 2025 (aged 91) Medan, Indonesia
- Motto: Omnibus Omnia

Alfred Gonti Pius Datubara, OFM Cap (12 February 1934 – 17 October 2025) was the Indonesian Roman Catholic archbishop of Archdiocese of Medan from 1976 to 2009.

== Biography ==
Datubara was born in Lawe Bekung in Atjeh, Dutch East Indies (present-day Aceh, Indonesia), and was ordained to the priesthood in 1964. He served as the titular bishop of the Herceg Novi in 1975. In 1976, at the age of 42, Datubara was installed as the first native-born Indonesian Archbishop of Medan, succeeding Antoine Henri van den Hurk. He held the title of archbishop until 2009 when he reached the mandatory retirement age of 75. He was a member of the Order of Friars Minor Capuchin. He died in Medan on 17 October 2025, at the age of 91.

Catholic Church titles
| Preceded by Antoine Henri van den Hurk | Archbishop of Medan; 1976–2009 | Succeeded by Anicetus Bongsu Antonius Sinaga |
| Preceded by Abel Costas Montaño | Titular Bishop of Novi; 1975–1976 | Succeeded by Juan Ignacio Larrea Holguín |
| Preceded by — | Auxiliary Bishop of Medan; 1975–1976 | Succeeded by — |
