= Anicetus Bongsu Antonius Sinaga =

Indonesian Roman Catholic bishop (1941–2020)

Anicetus Bongsu Antonius Sinaga OFM Cap
- Archbishop emeritus, Archdiocese of Medan
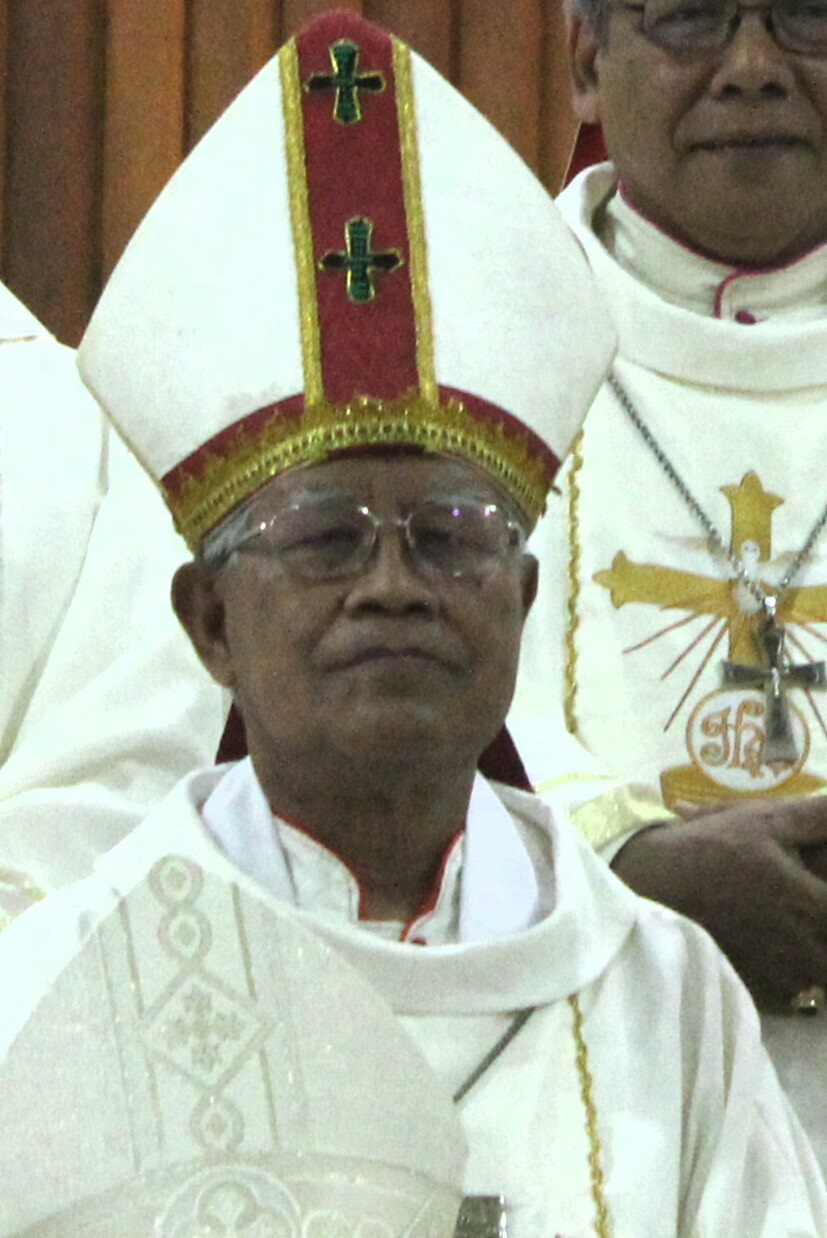
- Sinaga in 2017
- Church: Roman Catholic Church
- Archdiocese: Archdiocese of Medan
- In office: 2009–2018
- Predecessor: Alfred Gonti Pius Datubara
- Successor: Kornelius Sipayung
- Previous post: Bishop of Sibolga (1980–2004)

Orders
- Ordination: 13 December 1969
- Consecration: 6 January 1981
- Rank: Archbishop

Personal details
- Born: 25 September 1941 Nagadolok, Simalungun, Dutch East Indies
- Died: 7 November 2020 (aged 79) Medan, Indonesia
- Motto: Ad Pascua et Aquas Conducit

Anicetus Bongsu Antonius Sinaga, OFM Cap (25 September 1941 – 7 November 2020) was the Indonesian Roman Catholic bishop of the Diocese of Sibolga and then Archbishop of the Archdiocese of Medan from 2009 to 2018.

== Biography ==
Sinaga was born in Nagadolok in Simalungun, Dutch East Indies, and was ordained to the priesthood in 1969. He served as a bishop of the Roman Catholic Diocese of Sibolga, Indonesia from 1981 until 2004, when he was installed as Coadjutor Archbishop of the archdiocese Medan. He was appointed archbishop of Medan in 2009, succeeding Alfred Gonti Pius Datubara. He was a member of the Order of Friars Minor Capuchin. In addition to his life as clergy Sinaga has also written about Toba spirituality, later publishing a book expanding on his dissertation from Catholic University of Leuven titled The Toba-Batak High God: Transcendence and Immanence.

Pope Francis accepted his resignation as Archbishop of Medan on 7 December 2018.

On 20 October 2020, it was reported that Sinaga had tested positive for the COVID-19 virus. Sinaga died in hospital on 7 November 2020.
