= 2011 Panasonic Gobel Awards =

Indonesian television rewards ceremony

Annual Panasonic Gobel Awards
- Date: March 25, 2011
- Location: XXI Djakarta Theater, Menteng, Central Jakarta
- Hosted by: Fanny Fabriana; Sari Nilam; Indra Bekti

Television/radio coverage
- Network: RCTI, MNCTV, Global TV

The 14th Annual Panasonic Gobel Awards was a ceremony held to honoring the favorite in Indonesian television programming/individual/production works, as chosen by the verification team of this ceremony awards. It was held on March 25, 2011, at the Djakarta Theater XXI in Jalan M.H. Thamrin, Menteng, Central Jakarta. This year's edition of the ceremony awards was themed "Bersama Untuk Bumi Indonesia" (en: Together for Indonesian Earth). The ceremony was hosted by presenter Indra Bekti and Sari Nila on the red carpet and by Fanny Febriana for the live event and also introduced as Miss Green.

The awards featured some of Indonesia's best singers such as Nidji, SM*SH, Vicky Shu, Inul Daratista, Andien, Titi Sjuman, D'Bagindas and many more. The performers, both singers and nominee readers wore formal clothes designed by Indonesia's best designers and the evening peak of this 2011 ceremony awards broadcast live by TV stations under the control of MNC Group, such as RCTI, MNCTV, and Global TV.

== Judges (Verification Team) ==
- Karni Ilyas (TV Delegation),
- Ezki Suyanto (Commissaries of KPI-Komisi Penyiaran Indonesia),
- Putra Nababan (Delegation from desk News),
- Manoj Punjabi (Expert of Soap opera program and Production House),
- Anjasmara (Delegation of artist),
- Titan Hermawan(Station TV Delegation),
- Maman Hermawan (expertise program TV),
- Harsiwi Achmad (Delegation from station TV and production house),
- Soraya Perucha (Delegation from station TV),
- Yeni Anshar (Delegation from station TV) And
- Feni Rose (expertise program infotainment).

== Winners and nominees ==
The nominees were announced on February 24, 2011. For this year, the categories added for four new category: "Favorite FTV Program", "Favorite Travel, Hobbies, and Lifestyle Program", "Favorite News Magazine Program" and "Favorite Sport Journal Program". Winners are listed first and highlighted on boldface.

=== Program ===
| Favorite Drama Series Program | Favorite Quiz/Game Show Program |
|---|---|
| **Putri yang Ditukar (RCTI)**; Dia Jantung Hatiku (RCTI); Safa dan Marwah (RCTI); Cinta Fitri Season 7 (Indosiar); Kemilau Cinta Kamila (RCTI) | **Super Family (ANTV)**; Gong Show (Trans TV); Cewek Atau Cowok (Trans TV); Happy Family (Trans TV); Super Deal 2 Milyar (ANTV) |
| Favorite Infotainment Program | Favorite Music/Variety Show Program |
| **Silet (RCTI)**; Intens (RCTI); Halo Selebriti (SCTV); Hot Shot (SCTV); Investigasi Selebriti (Trans TV) | **Dahsyat (RCTI)**; The Promotor (Trans TV); Hip-Hip Hura (SCTV); Dangdut Never Dies (MNCTV); Kemilau Mandiri Fiesta (RCTI) |
| Favorite Reality Show Program | Favorite Comedy Program |
| **Uya Emang Kuya (SCTV)**; 2010 Take Celebrity Out (Indosiar); Jika Aku Menjadi... (Trans TV); Realigi (Trans TV); Termehek-Mehek (Trans TV) | **Opera Van Java (Trans 7)**; Sinden Sip Sip Sip (Trans TV); Sketsa (Trans TV); Studio 1 (Trans TV); Saatnya Kita Sahur (Trans TV) |
| Favorite News Talkshow Program | Favorite Entertainment Talkshow Program |
| **Obama Eksklusif RCTI Bersama Putra Nababan (RCTI)**; Kick Andy (Metro TV); Obama Bicara Tentang Indonesia (TvOne); Barometer (SCTV); Jakarta Lawyers Club (TvOne); My Name Is Eko (Global TV); Minggu Malam Bersama Slamet Rahardjo (TVRI) | **Beauty dan Azis (Trans 7)**; Bukan Empat Mata (Trans 7); PAS Mantab (Trans 7); Hitam Putih (Trans 7); Pintu Kejutan (Trans 7) |
| Favorite Sport Game Program | Favorite Sport Journal Program |
| **2010 Piala Suzuki AFF (RCTI)**; 2010 Piala Indonesia (RCTI); Djarum ISL (ANTV); Liga Joss Indonesia (ANTV); Liga Ti-Phone (ANTV) | **Galeri Sepak Bola Indonesia (Trans 7)**; One Stop Football (Trans 7); Highlights MotoGP (Trans 7); Highlights Otomotif (Trans 7); Sport 7 (Trans 7) |
| Favorite Talent Search Program | Favorite Children Program |
| **Indonesia Mencari Bakat Bersama Supermi (Trans TV)**; Indonesian Idol 2010 (RCTI); Viva Dangdut Mania (TPI); Mamamia (Indosiar); Suara Indonesia Bersama Yamaha (Trans TV) | **Idola Cilik 3 (RCTI)**; Dunia Idola (RCTI); Si Kecil Berhati Besar (RCTI); Laptop Si Unyil (Trans 7); Cinta Juga Kuya (SCTV) |
| Favorite Travel, Hobbies and Lifestyle Program | Favorite FTV Program |
| **Ala Chef (Trans TV)**; Primitif Runaway (Trans TV); Ceriwis (Trans TV); Celebrity on Vacation (Trans TV); Ngulik (Trans TV) | **Six Million Dollar Man (SCTV)**; Mendadak Sakti 2 (Trans TV); Silat Boy 2 (Trans TV); Silat Boy 3 (Trans TV); Pencuri Jadi Putri (Trans TV) |
| Favorite News Magazine Program | Favorite News/Current Affairs Program |
| **Pulang Kampung Nih ((RCTI))**; Potret (SCTV); Metro Realitas (Metro TV); Suara Keadilan (TvOne); Topik Kita (ANTV); Diantara Kita (MNCTV) | **Seputar Indonesia (RCTI)**; Headline News (Metro TV); Kabar Petang (TvOne); Liputan 6 Petang (SCTV); Topik Petang Updade (ANTV) |

=== Individual ===
| Favorite Actor | Favorite Actress |
|---|---|
| **Atalarik Syah – Putri Yang Ditukar**; Dude Herlino – Dia Jantung Hatiku; Rezky Aditya – Putri Yang Ditukar; Vino G. Bastian – Arini; Teuku Wisnu – Cinta Fitri Season 7 | **Nikita Willy – Putri Yang Ditukar**; Asmirandah – Kemilau Cinta Kamila; Agnes Monica – Pejantan Cantik; Naysilla Mirdad – Dia Jantung Hatiku; Shireen Sungkar – Cinta Fitri Season 7 |
| Favorite Quiz/Game Show Presenter | Favorite Infotainment Presenter |
| **Anjasmara – 1 Lawan 100**; Choky Sitohang – Happy Song; Darius Sinathrya – Super Family; Sarah Sechan – Ranking 1; Ruben Onsu – Ranking 1 | **Irfan Hakim – Insert**; Feni Rose – Silet; Cut Tari – Insert; Indra Herlambang – Insert; Ruben Onsu – Kiss |
| Favorite Music/Variety Show Presenter | Favorite News/Current Affairs Presenter |
| **Olga Syahputra – Dahsyat**; Choky Sitohang – Kemilau Mandiri Fiesta; Ivan Gunawan – Inbox; Gading Marten – Inbox; Raffi Ahmad – Dahsyat | **Putra Nababan – Seputar Indonesia**; Desi Anwar; Jeremy Teti – Liputan 6; Najwa Shihab – Mata Najwa; Tina Talisa – Apa Kabar Indonesia |
| Favorite Talkshow Presenter | Favorite Talent Show Presenter |
| **Andy F. Noya – Kick Andy**; Deddy Corbuzier – Hitam Putih; Dorce Gamalama; Najwa Shihab; Tukul Arwana – Bukan Empat Mata | **Ananda Omesh – Indonesia Mencari Bakat Bersama Supermi**; Okky Lukman; Daniel Mananta; Tora Sudiro; Ruben Onsu |
| Favorite Reality Show Presenter | Favorite Sport Presenter |
| **Uya Kuya – Uya Emang Kuya**; Cici Panda – Katakan Cinta; Erwin A.Y. Raja; Mandala Shoji – Termehek-Mehek; Ratna Listy | **Donna Agnesia**; Darius Sinathrya – Liga Inggris; Boy Noya; Ricky Jo; Terry Putri |
Favorite Comedian
**Sule – Opera Van Java**; Olga Syahputra; Aziz Gagap – Opera Van Java; Parto Patrio – Opera Van Java; Komeng
