= 2012 Panasonic Gobel Awards =

Annual Panasonic Gobel Awards
- Date: March 27, 2012
- Location: XXI Djakarta Theater, Menteng, Central Jakarta
- Hosted by: Choky Sitohang; Fenita Arie

Television/radio coverage
- Network: RCTI, MNCTV, Global TV

The 15th Annual Panasonic Gobel Awards honoring the favorite in Indonesian television programming/production work/individual, was held on March 27, 2012, at the Djakarta Theater XXI in Jalan M.H. Thamrin, Menteng, Central Jakarta. Both of presenter Choky Sitohang and Fenita Arie was hosting for the ceremony awards. The 2012 edition of the Panasonic Gobel Awards was themed for "Yang Muda Yang Menginspirasi" (en: Inspiring Young).

The awards featured some of Indonesia's best singers such as Ungu, Kotak, Princess, Mulan Jameela and many more. The performers, both singers and nominee readers wore formal clothes designed by Indonesia's best designers and the evening peak of 2012 awards ceremony was broadcast live by TV stations under MNC Group, such as RCTI, MNCTV, and Global TV.

== Vote system ==
The election system starts with the determination of nominations per each category by a team of verification of the Indonesian television beings composed of nine representatives of the television industry, such as broadcasters, production houses, the Indonesian Broadcasting Commission, actress/actor and others. The determination is based on ratings show the highest and determination through a poll via telephone (phone interview).

Panasonic Gobel has opened polls to the public for 30 categories on February 25 until March 24, 2012, which can then be sorted by BDO Tanubrata, to obtain data that is valid poll, is 1 ID for 1 vote. Polls can be done through 4 medium: SMS, online, letters and fliers. This year, first time of this 2012 awards ceremony add a number of premium SMS to 3 numbers, in order to reach the wider society; 6222 for Linktone, 9981 for Vivanews and 7288 for Surya Citra Media.

== Winners and nominees ==
The nominees were announced on February 24, 2012. The categories added the new category of "Favorite Investigation Program" and category of "Favorite Music/Variety Show Program" was separated into each. Winners are listed first and highlighted on boldface.

=== Program ===
Favorite Drama Series Program	Favorite Quiz/Game Show Program
**Putri yang Ditukar (RCTI)**; Islam KTP (SCTV); Anugerah (RCTI); Ketika Cinta Bertasbih (RCTI); Dewa (RCTI)	**Super X-Tion bersama Extra Joss (Trans TV)**; Sang Ahli (Trans 7); World Record bersama Mito (Trans 7); Raja Gombal (Trans 7); Insomnia (Trans TV)
Favorite Infotainment Program	Favorite Music Show Program
**Silet (RCTI)**; Hot Shot (SCTV); Intens (RCTI); Investigasi Selebriti (Trans TV); Status Selebriti (SCTV)	**Mega Konser (RCTI)**; Hip Hip Hura (SCTV); 2011 Tolak Angin Karnaval SCTV (SCTV); I-Pop (SCTV); Harmoni (SCTV)
Favorite Variety Show Program	Favorite Reality Show Program
**Dahsyat (RCTI)**; Kemilau Mandiri Fiesta (Trans 7); The Hits (Trans TV); Mama Udah Bobo (RCTI); Inbox (SCTV)	**Uya Emang Kuya (SCTV)**; Termehek-Mehek (Trans TV); Jika Aku Menjadi... (Trans TV); Super Trap (Trans TV); Pengabdian (Trans TV)
Favorite Comedy Program	Favorite Children Program
**Opera Van Java (Trans 7)**; Comedy Project (Trans TV); Saung Sule (Trans 7); Sketsa (Trans TV); Saatnya Kita Sahur (Trans TV)	**Aksi Didi Tikus (MNCTV)**; Cinta Juga Kuya (SCTV); Laptop Si Unyil (Trans 7); Cita-Citaku (Trans 7); Dunia Air (Trans 7)
Favorite News Talkshow Program	Favorite Entertainment Talkshow Program
**Kick Andy (Metro TV)**; Jakarta Lawyers Club (TvOne); Barometer (SCTV); Apa Kabar Indonesia Malam (TvOne); Tupperware She Can (Trans 7)	**Buaya Show (Indosiar)**; PAS Mantab (Trans 7); Hitam Putih (Trans 7); Bukan Empat Mata (Trans 7); Ceriwis (Trans TV)
Favorite Sport Game Program	Favorite Sport Journal Program
**SEA Games Final: Indonesia VS Malaysia (RCTI)**; Pra-kualifikasi Piala Dunia 2014: Indonesia VS Bahrain (SCTV); Laga Bintang: Indonesia All Star VS LA Galaxy (MNCTV); Indonesia Friendly Match: Indonesia VS Palestina (RCTI); Asian Disaster Relief Tour: Milan Glory VS Indonesia All Star (RCTI)	**One Stop Football (Trans 7)**; Galeri Sepakbola Indonesia (Trans 7); Highlights MotoGP (Trans 7); Highlights Otomotif (Trans 7); Sport 7 (Trans 7)
Favorite News Magazine Program	Favorite Investigation Program
**Seputar Peristiwa (RCTI)**; Di Antara Kita (MNCTV); Tak Seindah Janjinya (Trans 7); Mencari Keadilan (TvOne); Potret (SCTV)	**Sigi Investigasi (SCTV)**; Sidik Kasus (TPI); Telusur (TvOne); Jejak Malam (Trans 7); Topik Kita (ANTV)
Favorite Talent Show Program	Favorite FTV Program
**MasterChef Indonesia (RCTI)**; Boy & Girl Band Indonesia (SCTV); A-sing Star (Trans 7); Tarung Dangdut (MNCTV); Soccer Star Indonesia Bersama TOP 1 (MNCTV)	**Si Doel Anak Pinggiran (RCTI)**; Reuni SMA (SCTV); Sepeda Balap & Sate Kambing (SCTV); Cinta Pake Kontes (SCTV); Cintaku Berakhir di Rumah Susun (SCTV)
Favorite Travel, Hobby and Lifestyle Program	Favorite News/Current Affairs Program
**MasterClass (RCTI)**; Dapur Ramadhan Ala Fiesta (RCTI); Ala Chef (Trans TV); Mister Tukul (Trans 7); Benu Buloe (Trans TV)	**Seputar Indonesia (RCTI)**; Topik Petang (ANTV); Breaking News (Metro TV); Fokus (Indosiar); Metro Hari Ini (Metro TV); Lintas Siang (MNCTV); Liputan 6 Petang (SCTV); Kabar Petang (TvOne); Edisi Warta Malam (TVRI)

=== Individual ===
Favorite Actor	Favorite Actress
**Rezky Aditya – Putri Yang Ditukar**; Dude Herlino – Dewa; Teuku Wisnu – Cinta Fitri Season 7; Atalarik Syah – Putri Yang Ditukar; Ari Wibowo – Binar Bening Berlian	**Asmirandah – Binar Bening Berlian**; Nikita Willy – Putri Yang Ditukar; Shireen Sungkar – Cinta Fitri Season 7; Naysila Mirdad – Dewa; Nabila Syakieb – Anugerah
Favorite Quiz/Game Show Presenter	Favorite Infotainment Presenter
**Ruben Onsu – Ranking 1**; Deddy Corbuzier – Deal or No Deal Indonesia; Sarah Sechan – Ranking 1; Choky Sitohang; Helmi Yahya – Versus	**Feni Rose – Silet**; Indra Herlambang – Insert; Yuanita Christiani – Was-Was; Fenita Arie; Irfan Hakim – Insert
Favorite Music/Variety Show Presenter	Favorite News/Information Presenter
**Raffi Ahmad – Dahsyat**; Olga Syahputra – Dahsyat; Gading Marten – Inbox; Andhika Pratama – Inbox; Astrid Tiar – Inbox	**Putra Nababan – Seputar Indonesia**; Jeremy Teti – Liputan 6; Tina Talisa; Prabu Revolusi; Grace Natalie
Favorite News/Information Talkshow Presenter	Favorite Entertainment Talkshow Presenter
**Tina Talisa – Fokus**; Andy F. Noya – Kick Andy; Karni Ilyas; Najwa Shihab; Desi Anwar	**Uya Kuya – Buaya Show**; Tukul Arwana – Bukan Empat Mata; Deddy Corbuzier – Hitam Putih; Olga Syahputra; Sule – PAS Mantab
Favorite Talent Show Presenter	Favorite Reality Show Presenter
**Olga Syahputra – Tarung Dangdut**; Ananda Omesh; Ruben Onsu – Boy & Girl Band Indonesia; Choky Sitohang; Andhika Pratama – Boy & Girl Band Indonesia	**Vincent Ryan Rompies – Mama Udah Bobo**; Mandala Shoji – Termehek-Mehek; Uya Kuya – Uya Emang Kuya; Olga Syahputra; Ruben Onsu
Favorite Sport Presenter	Favorite Comedian
**Boy Noya**; Darius Sinathrya; Terry Putri; Donna Agnesia; Fenita Arie	**Sule – Opera Van Java**; Andre Taulany – Opera Van Java; Olga Syahputra; Azis Gagap – Opera Van Java; Tukul Arwana

Lifetime Achievement Award
**Karni Ilyas**
