= Indonesia Mencari Bakat =

- Also known as: Indonesia Mencari Bakat Bersama Supermi (season 1–2); Indonesia Mencari Bakat Bersama Susu Zee (season 3–4)
- Genre: Talent search
- Created by: Wishnutama
- Presented by: Ananda Omesh; Rian Ibram
- Judges: Sarah Sechan; Addie MS; Titi Rajo Bintang; Rianti Cartwright; Deddy Corbuzier; Syahrini; Ivan Gunawan; Cinta Laura; Raditya Dika
- Country of origin: Indonesia
- No. of seasons: 5
- No. of episodes: Unknown

Production
- Production locations: Studio 1 Trans TV, Jakarta
- Running time: 120 minutes

Original release
- Network: Trans TV (2010–2014, 2021-2022)
- Release: March 7, 2010 – January 16, 2022

Indonesia Mencari Bakat is an Indonesian talent variety show on Trans TV. Viewers are involved in determining the best talent through polls via SMS. The main Sponsor Supermi for season 1-2 and Susu Zee (season 3–4). Indonesia Mencari Bakat won Panasonic Gobel Awards for the Best Talent Search category in the year 2011.

On July 27, 2021, Trans TV announced that the fifth season of Indonesia Mencari Bakat would be held after 7 year hiatus.

== Format ==
Unlike most talent search programs on Indonesian television, which focus solely on singing talent, this program showcases a wider range of talents. It showcases not only singing, but also magic, dancing, playing musical instruments, unique performances, and more.

Based on Trans TV's history of consistently developing new talent, from unknowns to superstars in the Indonesian entertainment industry, the station hopes to discover new talent who will eventually join its lineup through Indonesia Mencari Bakat.

In the first year that IMB was broadcast, to be precise in 2010, Trans TV actually already had a program Gong Show, with a nearly identical program format. The downside is that the image that has been ingrained in the public is already comedy (with the host Arie Untung jthe udges Komeng, Adul, and Olga Syahputra) and the narrow scope of the talent search, which was limited to Jakarta–Bandung and its surrounding areas. Gong Show, a talent search without limits, had already been running for four years at that time, with good ratings and share. Initially, Trans TV intended to elevate Gong Show to a national scale. However, with its inherent comedic image, they feared it would limit public enthusiasm for registering as participants. Ultimately, it was decided to keep Gong Show with its existing concept. For the national talent search, they presented Indonesia Mencari Bakat with a more serious spirit from the beginning of its concept.

The first stage of auditions was held in various major cities in Indonesia, and starting with the fourth season, it can also be done online. From the audition, Trans TV then selected the best for the real audition stage with artist judges in Jakarta (in the fourth season, auditions with artist judges were also held in various audition cities). The artist judges selected several candidates to perform in the group show. The contestants were then divided into groups. Each group would select three contestants to advance to the top 12, or semifinals.

Three winners will be selected for each episode of the group show: two contestants selected by SMS polling and one chosen by the judges. This selection is made to maintain a balance between subjectivity and objectivity. The next stage will see the top six selected to compete in the final round, until a final winner emerges, who will receive a cash prize and a work contract with Trans Media.

== Season overviews ==
Season	Showtime		Winner	Runner Up	Third Place
Season	Start	End	Winner	Runner Up	Third Place
1	May 30, 2010	October 24, 2010	Klantink	Putri Ayu Silaen	Brandon De Angelo
2	December 12, 2010	February 27, 2011	Uma Tobing	Ale Soul	Umar Adi Ali
3	September 15, 2012	May 12, 2013	Sandrina Mazaya	Vina Candrawati	Joshua Pangaribuan
4	August 1, 2014	November 9, 2014	Rismawanda	Rega	Eka dan Dwi
5	October 23, 2021	January 16, 2022	Ksatria	Rizal Lianto	West JV

== Awards and nominations ==
On 2011, Indonesia Mencari Bakat was chosen as the favorite talent search program at the 2011 Panasonic Gobel Awards, beating other events such as Indonesian Idol 2010, Mamamia Show and Indonesia's Got Talent.

Years	Awards	Categories	Receiver	Result	Ref.
2011	Panasonic Gobel Awards 2011	Talent Search Program	Indonesia Mencari Bakat	Won	
2014	Panasonic Gobel Awards 2014	Talent Search Program & Reality Show	Indonesia Mencari Bakat	Nominated	
2022	Anugerah Komisi Penyiaran Indonesia 2022	Talent Show Program	Indonesia Mencari Bakat	Nominated	

== Controversy ==
Trans TV was copied Indonesia's Got Talent from the original Got Talent format. According to Trans TV, if a television station copies the program, it means they have created a trend. On the other side Fremantle, which broadcast the first season of this show, is not worried and is ready to compete with this show.

== See also ==
- Indonesia's Got Talent

Preceded by The Master	Panasonic Awards; Indonesia Mencari Bakat; 2011	Succeeded by MasterChef Indonesia
