= Metropole, Jakarta =

Multipurpose building complex in Indonesia

Metropole
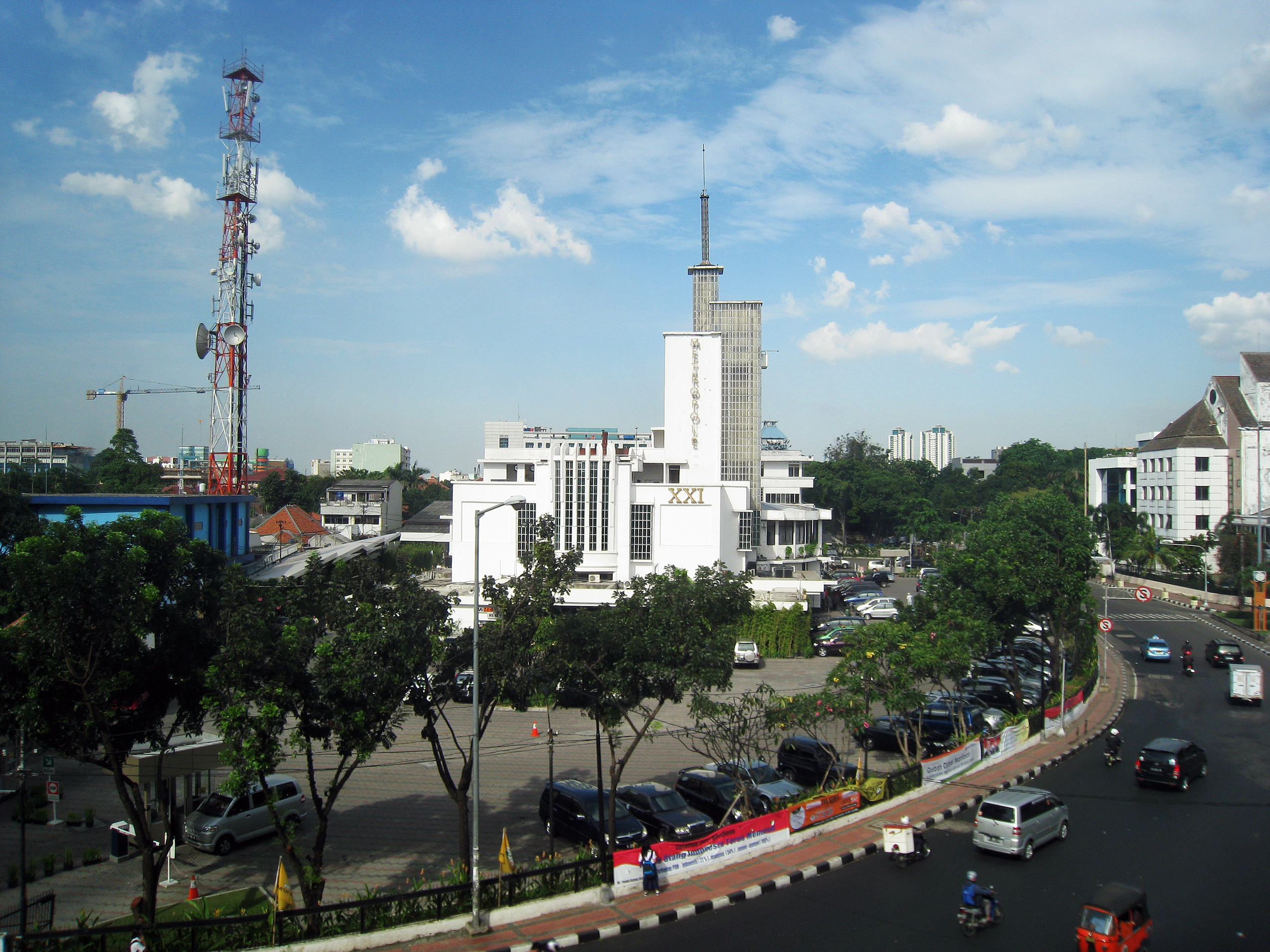
- Metropole XXI Cineplex in 2010

- Location within Jakarta
- Alternative names: Megaria

General information
- Architectural style: Nieuwe Bouwen, Nieuwe Zakelijkheid
- Location: Central Jakarta, Jakarta, Indonesia, Jalan Pegangsaan 21, Indonesia
- Coordinates: 6°12′0″S 106°50′37″E
- Current tenants: 21 Cineplex
- Construction started: 1932
- Inaugurated: 11 August 1949
- Owner: Handoyo

Design and construction
- Architect: Liauw Goan Seng

Other information
- Public transit: Cikini

Metropole is a historic multipurpose building complex in Jakarta, Indonesia. Currently, Metropole is the oldest surviving movie theater in Jakarta. One of its main tenants is the 21 Cineplex group, which operates the Metropole XXI movie theater in the complex's main building. As a historic cinema, it has screened films during the first Indonesian Film Festival (1955) and the 16th Asia Pacific Film Festival (1970). Metropole was listed as an architectural heritage site by the governor in 1993.

Other tenants including a Starbucks coffeehouse chain, a bakery and an upscale Indonesian restaurant on the second floor.

== Location ==
Metropole Cinema is located near the junction of Jalan Diponegoro, Pegangsaan Timur, and Jalan Proklamasi, in the posh residential area of Menteng, Central Jakarta. The building is close to the railway crossing connecting Manggarai Station to Cikini Station (now elevated railway).

Metropole is composed of three main buildings. The main building houses a movie theater owned by the 21 Cineplex group. The theater once used a large space with an audience capacity of around 1,000 including a balcony seats, but it has since been renovated and divided into four separate theaters holding fewer than 170 persons each. Two additional buildings are attached to the rear of the structure, with one being used as one of the cineplex and performance space, and the other housing offices and a supermarket, and later changed to a sanitary fittings manufacturer showroom. The three buildings are located on an 11,800-m² plot of land and housed a total of 12 tenants.

== History ==
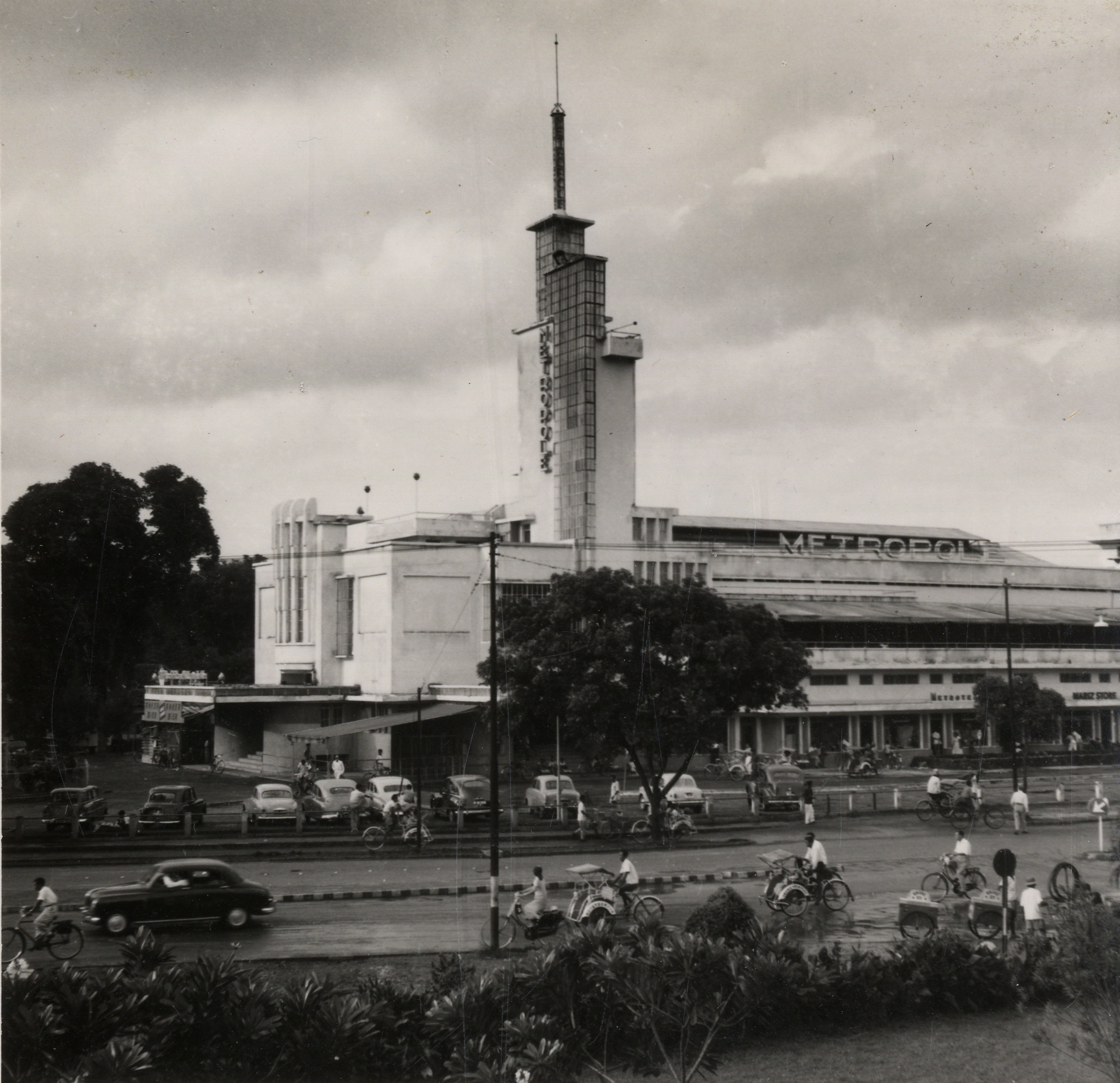
Metropole Cinema, c. 1930-1955

The architect of Metropole Cinema was Liauw Goan Seng, but was often mistaken to be Johannes Martinus Groenewegen, which is actually the architect of another cinema in Jakarta, Menteng Cinema (1950), which was demolished in 1988 in the area where the Menteng Huis shopping complex stands now. Metropole was constructed in 1932 and given the name Bioscoop Metropool in Dutch. Megaria primarily screened films released by Metro-Goldwyn-Mayer. The first movie shown during its opening in April 1951 was Annie Get Your Gun starring Betty Hutton.

Early 1950s saw the resurgence of Indonesian film industry. The Metropole played a key role in boosting local film industry in competing with cinemas who generally preferred Hollywood films. In 1954, Usmar Ismail's film, Krisis, was shown in the Metropole and the film was a great success that it played for four weeks.

It was one of the theaters that screened films during the first Indonesian Film Festival in 1955 and was a supporting theater when the city hosted the 16th Asia Pacific Film Festival in 1970.

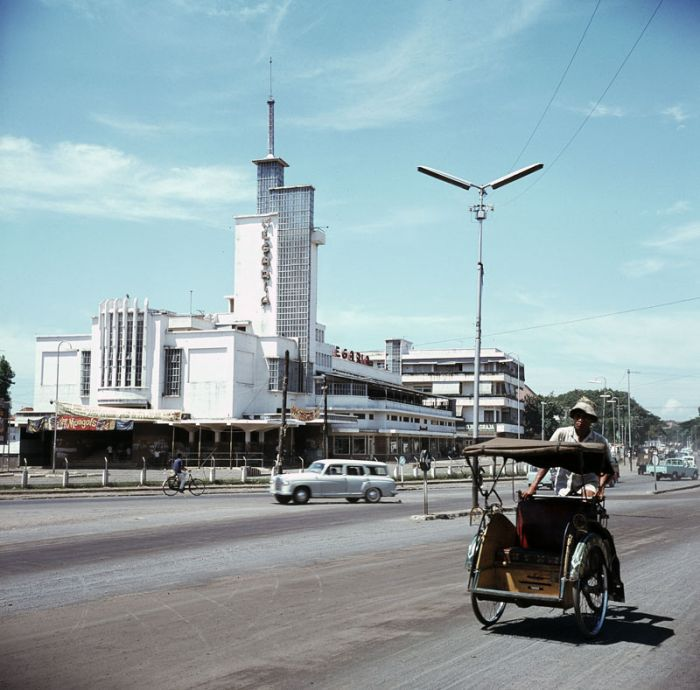
Megaria building, c. 1960–1980

Around 1960, the cinema's name was changed to Megaria during the presidency of Sukarno, who carried out an anti-Western policy and thought that the word metropole was too foreign.

In 1984, the Kartika Chandra theater became the city's first cinema to apply the cineplex concept of having multiple theater screens. Megaria followed suit in 1986 and added a second screening space behind the already existing one. Despite this change, the theater did not enjoy the same success as Kartika Chandra and it was forced into bankruptcy. The complex would soon be absorbed into the emerging 21 Cineplex theater network, managed by the company Subentra. Megaria officially became part of the network in April 1989 and was renamed Metropole 21. The 21 Cineplex subsequently dissected the main large screening hall into three separate cineplex by removing the balcony seats of the original theatre — making Metropole 21 as a cineplex with 4 screening rooms; 3 in the main building, and the 4th one is in separate building behind the secondary building. The main stairs which leads to the second floor lobby, which originally leads to the demolished balcony seats, was repurposed as a videogame arcade, and later repurposed as the cinema's office. Its name later changed back to Megaria 21.

The governor of Jakarta declared the Megaria building as an architectural heritage site in 1993. Proximity of its location to offices of the three dominant parties during the New Order—the Indonesian Democratic Party (PDI), the United Development Party (PPP), and the Functional Groups (Golkar)—made Megaria a popular gathering location for students during the Reform movement in the late 1990s.

Contrary to popular belief, Metropole is not the oldest movie theater in Jakarta. The oldest movie theater in Jakarta is Grand Theater, established in 1930 on the corner of Jalan Kramat Raya and Jalan Kramat Bunder, however, it is in an extremely poor condition and has survived by offering low budget movies (usually horror or erotic).

The Megaria building was listed for sale on 8 March 2007 for a price of Rp 151,099,000,000 (US$16,500,000). Although the city government did not oppose the sale and allowed for a possible change in the building's function, it forbade the new owner from altering the appearance, ornaments, or main structure. The sale was cancelled in 2008, and the 21 Cineplex group extended its lease of the building. The company renovated the interior to match other upper-class cinemas under its management and also refurbished its exterior. The 21 Cineplex has established a higher upper-class cinema brand called XXI. Nowadays, the name is changed back to Metropole XXI.

Other than the 21 cineplex, throughout the 1990s to 2000s the tenants of the then dilapidated building were modest establishments, including a billiard hall in the large second floor, a barber shop, and several restaurants; a pempek restaurant, a Chinese restaurant, and a Javanese grilled chicken restaurant. Following the renovation from 2009 to 2015, the building is carefully renovated and being restored to its former glory, and being repurposed as a classy establishment. The previous ground floor tenants are replaced by a bakery and several new shops, while the former billiard hall on the second floor is now occupied by a new tenant; Roemah Kuliner, an upscale restaurant with food hall system, dedicated to serving authentic Indonesian cuisine.

After the renovation, the 21 Cineplex also used to own and operate XXI Garden Cafe located in the building. However, since 2014, the Garden Cafe was replaced by a Starbucks coffeehouse chain. The secondary building on the east side however, which previously hosts Hero Supermarket, has been transformed as the showroom for Grohe, a German-based sanitary fittings company.

== Cited works ==
- Merrillees, Scott (2015). Jakarta: Portraits of a Capital 1950–1980. Jakarta: Equinox Publishing. ISBN 9786028397308.

== See also ==
- List of colonial buildings and structures in Jakarta
- Nieuwe Zakelijkheid
- Cinema of Indonesia
