= Silaen =

Batak surname originating in Indonesia

Silaen is one of Toba Batak clans originating in North Sumatra, Indonesia. People of this clan bear the clan's name as their surname. Notable people of this clan include:

- Jansen Ibrahim Silaen (1931-1997), Indonesian politician officer
- Putri Ayu Silaen (born 1997), Indonesian singer
