= Obama Eksklusif RCTI Bersama Putra Nababan =

- Also known as: Wawancara Eksklusif Barack Obama (Exclusive Interview with Barack Obama)
- Presented by: Putra Nababan
- Country of origin: Indonesia
- Original languages: Indonesia; English

Production
- Production locations: White House, Washington DC, United States of America

Original release
- Network: RCTI
- Release: March 2010

Obama Eksklusif RCTI Bersama Putra Nababan ("Putra Nababan Exclusive Interview with Barack Obama on RCTI") is a special television program showing an interview between Indonesian journalist Putra Nababan and President Barack Obama which aired on RCTI in March 2010. According to the president, this show was the first interview ever done by Indonesian television in the White House. The interview covered the partnership between Indonesia and the United States and the president's experiences during his childhood in Indonesia.

Obama also confirmed a delay in his planned visit to Indonesia due to the health care vote that was to be held by the US Congress at that time.

This show won an award at the 2011 Panasonic Gobel Awards.

== Awards ==
Year	Award	Category	Result
2011	2011 Panasonic Gobel Awards	News Talkshow Program	Won
