= Seputar Peristiwa =

Indonesian television program

- Created by: RCTI
- Presented by: Dian Mirza
- Country of origin: Indonesia
- Original language: Indonesian

Production
- Running time: 30 minutes

Original release
- Network: RCTI
- Release: 21 February – 7 June 2011

Seputar Peristiwa is a television program on RCTI. This program reveals the facts in the form of events surrounding the events both in Indonesia and the world. This program is broadcast daily by RCTI, from 12:30 to 13:00 WIB.

Seputar Peristiwa has won the 2012 Panasonic Gobel Awards for the News Magazine Program category in 2012.

== Hosts ==
- Dian Mirza

== Achievement ==
Year	Award	Categories	Recipients	Result
2012	Panasonic Gobel Awards	News Magazine Program	Seputar Perstiwa	Won
