= Vonny Cornellya =

Indonesian actress

Vonny Cornellya Permatasari
- Born: August 14, 1979 (age 47); Bogor, West Java, Indonesia
- Occupations: Model, singer, actress
- Years active: 1997–present
- Parent(s): Subartono & Endang Warsiati Supratmi
- Musical career
- Genre: Pop
- Years active: 1997–2000
- Label: Musica Studios

Vonny Cornellya Permatasari known as Vonny Cornelia (born in Bogor, West Java 14 August 1979) is an Indonesian actress. Vonny once known as a member of the vocal group Bening.

== Karier ==
=== Early career ===
Vonny began her career as a model when she was selected as a cover girl for Mode magazine in 1992.

=== Bening ===
In 1997, together with three fellow models, Dewi Murniaty, Ditasiani Oktovie and Vera Soedibyo, Vonny joined the vocal group Bening. Under the guidance of Yovie Widianto, Is Dody, and Carlo Saba of Jasmine Trias, Bening released their first album in 1997 titled "No Love".

=== Soap operas ===
Vonny has appeared in multiple soap operas, including Let One Speak, Kemuning, Lady Luck, Appoint One Star, Ali & Sevira, The Lovers, One Ring Two Loves, and Time Keeps On Going. She also featured in the film "Between Me, Piano, and Your Poem" (2005).

== Cinemography ==
=== Films ===
- Antara Aku, Piano, dan Puisimu (2005)
- Mengaku Rasul (2008)

=== Soap operas ===
- Biarkan Orang Bicara (1995)
- Kemuning (1998)
- Hanya Kamu (1999)
- Dewi Fortuna (2000)
- Waktu Terus Berjalan (2000)
- Tunjuk Satu Bintang (2001)
- Terang Milikku Juga (2002&2004)
- Sebatas Impian (2005)
- Satu Cincin Dua Cinta (2006)
- Senyum Mba Yum
- Kasmaran
- 3 Pengantin Untuk Ayahku
- Cinta dan Anugerah
- Kejora dan Bintang
- Putri Yang Ditukar (2010)
- Yusra dan Yumna
- Yang Masih Dibawah Umur (2012)
- Akibat Pernikahan Dini
- Putri Nomor 1 (2013)

=== FTV ===
- Pacarin Aku dong Mba
- Sebening Airmata Ibu
- Tante, I'm Sorry

== Discography ==
=== Albums ===
- Ada Cinta (There is Love)
- Romantisme (Romanticism)

=== Single ===
- Apa Yang Kaurasakan (What do you feel)
- Disisi Dirimu (Hand Love )( duet with Congq Perwira )
