= National University (Indonesia) =

Indonesian university

Coordinates: 6.2808052°S 106.8393729°E

- Universitas Nasional
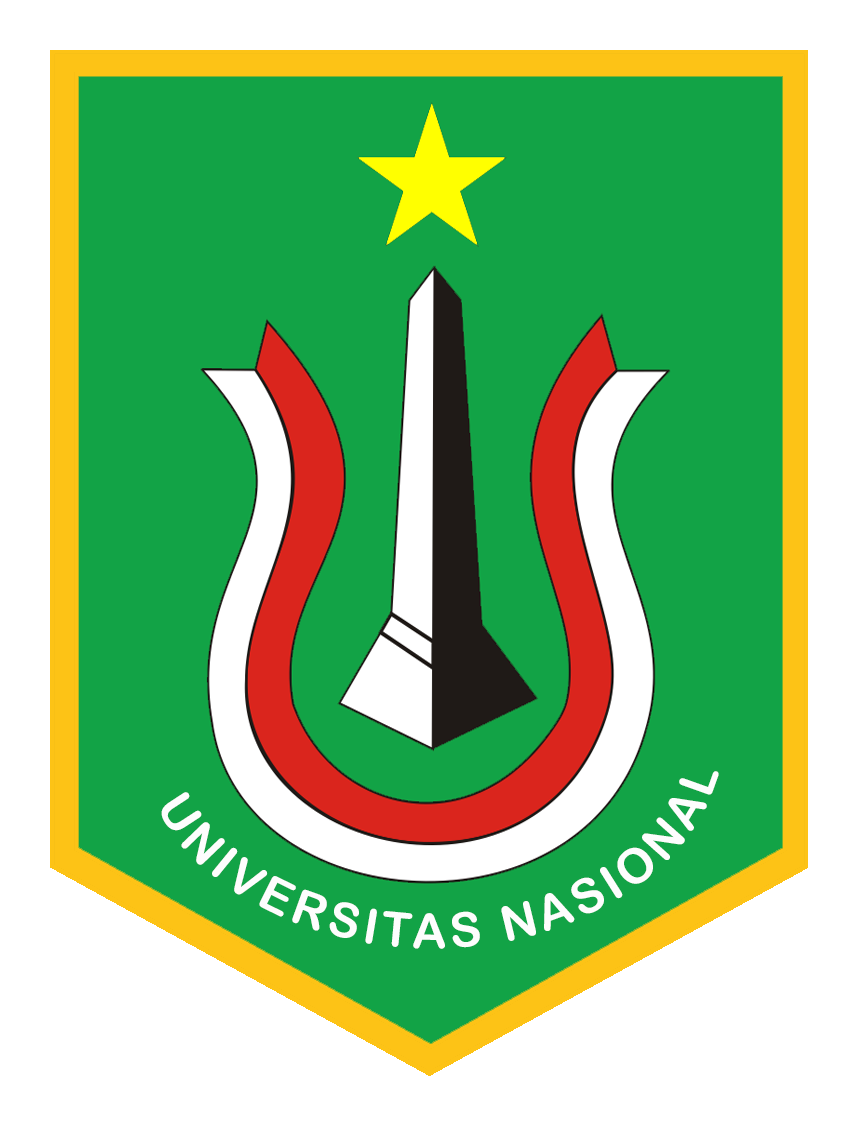
- Emblem
- Former names: 1949-1954; Akademi Nasional
- Motto: Pionir Perubahan
- Motto in English: Pioneering Transformation
- Type: Private University
- Established: 1949; 77 years ago
- Rector: Dr. El Amry Bermawi Putera, M.A
- Location: Jakarta, Indonesia
- Campus: Sawo Manila Campus Bambu Kuning Campus UNAS Tower
- Colors: Green
- Website: www.unas.ac.id
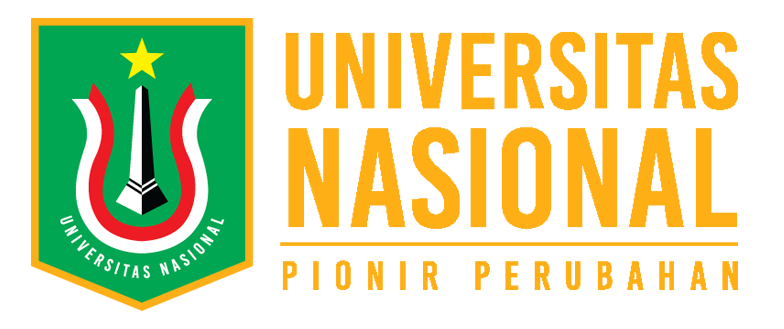

- Location of the university in Jakarta

The National University (Indonesian: Universitas Nasional, UNAS) is the oldest private university in Jakarta and the second oldest in Indonesia. It was founded as the National Academy by several Indonesian scholars on October 15, 1949. UNAS has been accredited "A" by the National Accreditation Body for Higher Education (BAN-PT), and also credited by QS Star University Rating, having been awarded 4 stars during the evaluation.

== History ==
UNAS laid its foundation in 1946 by members of the Association for the Advancement of Science and Culture (Indonesian: Perkumpulan Memajukan Ilmu dan Kebudayaan, PMIK). The founders were R. Teguh Suhardjo Sastrosuwingnyo, Mr. Sutan Takdir Alisjahbana, Mr. Soedjono Hardjosoediro, Prof. Sarwono Prawirohardjo, Mr. Prajitno Soewondo, Hazil, Kwari Katjabrata, Prof. Dr. R. M. Djoehana Wiradikarta, R. M. Soebagio, Ny. Noegroho, Drs. Adam Bakhtiar, Dr. Bahder Djohan, Dr. J. Leimena, Ir. Abd Karim, Prof. Dr. Soetomo Tjokronegoro, Mr. Ali Budiharjo, Poerwodarminta, Mr. Soetikno, Ir.TH. A. Resink, DR. Soemitro Djojohadikusumo, Noegroho, Soejatmiko, H.B. Jassin, Mochtar Avin, L. Damais, A.Djoehana, and Nona Roekmini Boediardjo Singgih.

Studies were conducted in 1946 by two committees.

The first committee, in charge of investigating how to invigorate life sciences in Indonesia, had the following members:

1. Dr. Leimena
2. IR. Abd. Karim
3. Prof. Dr. Soetomo Tjokronegoro
4. Mr. Ali Budihardjo
5. Ir. Th. A. Resink
6. Dr. Soemitro Djojohadikusumo

The second committee, in charge of motivating stimulating business activity, consisted of:

1. Nugroho
2. Soejatmoko
3. H.B.Jassin
4. Muchtar Avin
5. A. Djoehana
6. Nona Budihardjo
7. Nona Rukmini Singgih

In late 1946 short courses were established. On around October 1949, in response to demand from 400 high school graduates in Jakarta who did not want to attended Universiteit Indonesia of the Dutch colonial government, PMIK announced the opening of a National Academy comprising five faculties: Social Studies, Economics and Politics; Biology, Mathematics and Physics, Letters, and English Literature.

The term academy, rather than university was chosen to avoid colonial words during the Indonesian war of independence. Lectures began on October 15, 1949. On December 22, 1949, the Ministry of Education and Culture, then located in Yogyakarta, provided full recognition for the National Academy.

On 1 September 1954 through a deed by Mr. R. Soewandi, the National Academy was renamed the National University. For its support during the war of independence, in 1959, Indonesia's first president, Sukarno, bestowed the title "University Of Struggle" (Universitas Perjuangan).

== Campuses ==
=== Pasar Minggu ===
Campus at Pasar Minggu, located in South Jakarta, is the main campus, with faculties intended for undergraduate students.

=== Bambu Kuning ===
Serves as a laboratory.

=== UNAS Tower ===
A secondary campus, focussing mainly on graduate students.

== Academies ==
=== Studies ===
The National University is organized into several schools and academies, each with a dean/director. https://www.unas.ac.id/program-studi/

==== Faculties ====
- Faculty of Social Science and Political Science
1. Political Science
2. International Relations
3. Public Administration
4. Sociology Science
5. Communication Science
- Faculty of Economics and Business
1. Management
2. Accounting
3. Tourism
- Faculty of Language and Literature
1. English literature
2. Indonesian literature
3. Japanese Literature
4. Korean language
- Faculty of Law
1. Law
- Faculty of Engineering and Sciences
1. Physics
2. Electrical Engineering
3. Machine Engineering
4. Physical Engineering
- Faculty of Biology
1. Biology
- Faculty of Health Sciences
1. Nursing Science
2. Midwife Educator
3. Nurse Professional Education
4. Midwife Professional Education
- Faculty of Agriculture
1. Agriculture
- Faculty of Information and Technology
1. Information System
2. Computer Science Informatics

==== Graduate school ====
- Master of Political Science
- Master of Management
- Master of Public Administration
- Master of Law
- Master of Biology
- Master of Information Technology
- Doctor of Political Science

== Alumni ==
UNAS has alumni including politicians, government officials, scientific experts, researchers, business professionals, artists and entrepreneurs. They include Manuel Kaisiepo and Syaifullah Yusuf both are former State Minister for Acceleration of Development of Disadvantaged Regions; Agus Suparmanto former State Minister of Trade; Muhammad Hanif Dhakiri former State Minister of Manpower; Mochtar Kusumaatmaja. former State Minister of Foreign Affairs; Former Indonesian ambassador to Malaysia, Hadi Wayarabi and Ukraine, Yuddy Chrisnadi. Then alumni who became the first Doctor of Political Sciences in Indonesia, namely Prof. Dr. Deliar Noer. Alumni who become experts, namely Doctor of biological sciences. Endang Suhara, APU, and Dr. M. Kasim Moosa, APU. Expert researcher in Indonesian Institute of Sciences, Dr. Sharif Hidayat, APU, Syamsuddin Haris, M. Si, APU. There are alumni who work as artists and comedians such as Ateng, Jimmy Gideon or Unang as well as many other figures. Alumni who became members of the House of Representatives include Arzeti Bilbina.
