= Deliar Noer =

Deliar Noer (9 February 1926 – 17 June 2008) was an Indonesian Muslim scholar, politician, and lecturer, who was a former rector of the State University of Jakarta.

== Biography ==
=== Early life ===
Noer was born in Medan, North Sumatra on 9 February 1926. He was a Minang descent, from Bukittinggi, West Sumatra. After graduating from high school, he attended to Universitas Nasional and became a chairman of Himpunan Mahasiswa Islam. After he obtained a baccalaureate, he continued to Cornell University and became the first Indonesian that obtained Ph.D. degree in political science through a dissertation titled The Modernist Muslim Movement in Indonesia 1900-1942.

=== Political career ===
In early New Order era, he became an advisory staff of President Soeharto. Then he resigned because of different ideologies with other staff, and together with Mohammad Hatta, they founded Partai Demokrasi Islam Indonesia (Indonesian Islamic Democratic Party), but the party was not approved by government. In reformation era, he founded Partai Ummat Islam (Islamic Community Party), but did not get enough votes to surpass the parliamentary threshold in 1999 elections.

=== Controversy and death ===
He served as a rector of IKIP Jakarta (Institute of Teaching and Education Sciences of Jakarta) for seven years. In June 1974, he was fired a few months before deemed provocative against Minister of Education and Culture Sjarif Thayeb. Around ten years earlier, he also was prohibited to teach at Universitas Sumatera Utara by Thayeb who served as Minister of Natural Sciences and Higher Educations as he was accused of subversion and being a United States' stooge.

After being banned from teaching throughout Indonesia, he accepted an offer to become researcher from Australian National University. The second year in Australia, he became guest lecturer at Griffith University. After teaching for five years, he and Mohammad Natsir formed Lembaga Islam untuk Penelitian dan Pengembangan Masyarakat (Islamic Institution for Community Development and Research).

Noer died on 17 June 2008.

== Personal life ==
In 1961, he married Zahara Daulay in United States when he studied at Cornell University. He had a son and three grandchildren.

== Bibliography ==
- Anwar, Rosihan (2009). Sejarah Kecil Petite Histoire Indonesia (in Indonesian). Jakarta: Kepustakaan Populer Gramedia. ISBN 978-979-709-429-4.
- Rosidi, Ajip (2010). Mengenang Hidup Orang Lain: Sejumlah Obituari (in Indonesian). Jakarta: Kepustakaan Populer Gramedia. ISBN 978-979-9102-22-5.
