= Putri yang Ditukar =

- Genre: Sinetron
- Created by: Leo Sutanto
- Written by: Serena Luna
- Directed by: Gita Asmara
- Starring: Nikita Willy; Glenn Alinskie; Rezky Aditya; Yasmine Wildblood; Citra Kirana; Marini Zumarnis; Sultan Djorghi; Atalarik Syah; Vonny Cornelia; Moudy Wilhelnina; Raslina Rasyidin; Iszur Muchtar; Yadi Timo; Ana Pinem; Adipura; Aurélie Moeremans; Nunu Datau; Lucky Perdana; Christian Sugiono; Cut Syifa; Jessica Mila; Raya Kohandi; Helsi Herlinda; Devi Permatasari; Rionaldo Stockhorst; Tsania Marwa; Aqeela Calista
- Opening theme: Sudahi Perih Ini by D'Masiv
- Ending theme: Sudahi Perih Ini by D'Masiv
- Country of origin: Indonesia
- Original language: Indonesian
- No. of episodes: 676

Production
- Producer: Leo Sutanto
- Production location: Jakarta
- Running time: 60-180 minutes
- Production company: SinemArt

Original release
- Network: RCTI, Astro Aruna(Starting on 3/12/12)
- Release: September 20, 2010 – November 25, 2011

Related
- Binar Bening Berlian

Putri yang Ditukar (English translations: The Exchanged Daughter) is an Indonesian television serial (sinetron). It is the third long-running drama with 676 episodes after Cinta Fitri with 1002 episodes. It was formerly the second long-running drama until Tukang Bubur Naik Haji The Series broke the record with 2185 episodes. It was produced video productions house public distributor company network by SinemArt headed by Serena Luna.

== Cast ==
Cast	Role
Nikita Willy	Amira
Yasmine Wildblood	Zahira
Glenn Alinskie	Arman
Lucky Perdana	Tirta
Rezky Aditya	Rizky
Bobby Joseph	Dr. Rendra
Citra Kirana	Meisya
Tsania Marwa	Feli
Amanda William	Lisa
Sultan Djorghi	Ihsan
Marini Zumarnis	Utari
Atalarik Syah	Prabu Wijaya
Vonny Cornellya	Aini
Erlanda Gunawan	Erlanda
Moudy Wilhelmina	Malena
Iszur Muchtar	Rusli
Raslina Rasyidin	Leni
Helsi Herlinda	Farah
Adipura	Irfan
Yadi Timo	Wisnu
Ana Pinem	Surti
Mona Ratuliu	Gusti
Ria Probo	Livia
Rionaldo Stockhorst	Rangga
Devi Permatasari	Sari
Raya Kohandi	Salsa
Jessica Mila	Mia
Putri Patricia	Santi
Aurellie Moeremans	Nina
Celine Evangelista	Seli
Bara Tampubolon	Ian
Cut Syifa	Syifa
	Tony Lau
	Vincent Lau
Putri Titian	Thalia
Teuku Ryan	Sultan
Mathias Muchus	Matias
Nani Widjaja	Prabu Wijaya's potion maker
Lucky Alamsyah	Amira & Zahira's Doctor
Yoelitta Palar	Susan
Ibnu Jamil	Imron
	Marak Smith
Johannes Wahyudi	Bos Yang Minta Ditukar
Charles Johannes	Tukang Jual Apel Goreng
Richard Aditya Nugraha	Cowo Sange Yang Demen Sama Amira

== Synopsis ==
Amira and Zahira have different lives. Amira lives a simple life with her parents, Ihsan and Utari. While Zahira lives a luxurious life with her parents, Prabu and Aini, and stepmother, Malena and stepsister Meisya. Unlike Amira who lives in a loving family. Meanwhile, Zahira, although getting an abundance of affection from both parents, but she always got bad treatment from Malena and Meisya.

Arman, her personal driver, is the only person in the house who knew about it, and always makes Zahira rigid. No one knows that she is actually the child of Ihsan and Utari. While Amira is the son of Prabu and Aini. Wisnu holds a grudge against Prabu since it made it defective, exchanging the two babies who are born simultaneously.

Wisnu wanted to give Prabu a lesson, because he was caring for children from his archenemy, Ihsan, who happens to love his wife, Prabu's second wife, Aini. Wisnu once promised to match their children with Ihsan and Utari's child and also entrust their children to Surti, the housemaid of the Prabu family. And it is his son Arman.

Complexity occurs when each of the two reunited, Amira and Zahira. Amira was met by an accident with Prabu and Aini. Amira also met and became acquainted with Zahira and Arman, when she had an accident because she was nearly run down by a car driven by rich young man named Rizky. Rizky was driving with "Bos Yang Minta Ditukar" inside the car. Bos Yang Minta Ditukar pulled Rizky's pants down and caused him to lost concentrate and nearly hit Amira on the street. Amira was saved by abang Tukang Jual Apel Goreng who witnessed the accident, but he actually pretend to be good and molested Amira instead of helping her. "Cowo Sange Yang Demen Sama Amira", who has been following Amira around, was nearby and took this chance to molest Amira as well. Luckily, Rizky takes out the beer bottle and smashed "abang Tukang Jual Apel Goreng" and "Cowo Sange Yang Demen Sama Amira"'s heads and saves her. Meanwhile "Bos Yang Minta Ditukar" became in love with Amira and made things complicated. We then witness the return of "Cowo Sange Yang Demen Sama Amira" and molest she again.

Amira became confused when Prabu, Aini, and Zahira came to the funeral of her father, Ihsan. Amira, who is grieving was immediately shocked when Prabu introduced his name, because Amira heard that Prabu was the one who caused her father's death. Time was running out as that is what the TV station want the viewers to think, but they actually have two years to run this sinetron and made the stars become crazy rich Indonesians. And they all are like living in an unbroken circle which also confused everyone being the lead in circles. Will the truth be revealed? How will Amira and Zahira react when they found out the truth? And how will she deal with "Tukang Jual Apel Goreng", "Cowo Sange Yang Demen Sama Amira" and "Bos Yang Minta Ditukar"'s evil desire to her?

== International broadcasts ==
- Indonesia
- Malaysia TV3 (subtitled in Malay)
- Singapore Astro Aruna (5 September 2012 – Present to replace Sinetron Bintang which ends on 4 September 2012), Mediacorp HD5 (with English subtitles)

== Adaptations ==
Language	Title	Original release	Network(s)	Last aired	Notes
Malay	Puteri Yang Ditukar	9 July 2019	Astro Prima	28 October 2019	Remake

== Awards and nominations ==
Year	Award	Categories	Recipients	Result
2011	Panasonic Gobel Awards	Soap-Opera	Putri yang Ditukar	Won
2011	Panasonic Gobel Awards	Actor	Atalarik Syah	Won
2011	Panasonic Gobel Awards	Actress	Nikita Willy	Won
2012	Panasonic Gobel Awards	Soap-Opera	Putri yang Ditukar	Won
2012	Panasonic Gobel Awards	Actor	Rezky Aditya	Won
2012	Panasonic Gobel Awards	Actress	Nikita Willy	Nominated
