= Silet (TV program) =

Indonesian Infortainment by Indigo Production

- Genre: Infotainment
- Created by: Indigo Production
- Country of origin: Indonesia
- Original language: Indonesian

Production
- Camera setup: Multi camera
- Running time: 120 Minutes

Original release
- Network: RCTI iNews
- Release: October 21, 2002 – August 31, 2026

Silet (English: Razor) is a television news entertainment program formatting infotainment that is broadcast on the Indonesian TV station RCTI and INews. This program first aired on October 21, 2002 hosted by Feni Rose. The program has the slogan is "Semua dikupas secara tajam, setajam Silet (English: Everything is striped off sharply, as sharp as a razor blade), and primarily reports on celebrity news and gossip, along with previews of upcoming films, television shows, viral on social media and gothic mystery, regular segments about all of those seven subjects, along with overall film and television industry news.

== Presenters ==
=== Finals ===
- Widi Dwinanda
- Estherlita Corraima
- Feby Marcelia
- Ajeng Suseno

=== Formers ===
- Ranty Maria
- Evelina Witanama
- Fitri Ayu
- Dhiti Ismawardhani
- Tyas Mirasih
- Angie Ang
- Dona Amelia
- Dona Arsinta
- Sandra Olga
- Feni Rose

== Controversy ==
=== Raid of Angel Lelga by Vicky Prasetyo (2018) ===
The divorce case between Vicky Prasetyo and Angel Lelga has a long tail. The reason is, there are many dramas and problems that occur, one of which is the story of the raid on Angel Lelga's residence by Vicky Prasetyo. This became public consumption as it was aired live by several private television stations and social media.

Related to this, the Indonesian Broadcasting Commission (KPI) decided to give administrative sanctions in the form of written warnings to RCTI and iNews for airing Vicky Prasetyo's raid.

=== Merapi Eruptions (2010) ===
The editorial team of Silet has finally apologized for the infotainment broadcast on RCTI on Sunday November 7, 2010, which reported the prediction of 2010 Merapi's eruption in Yogyakarta. As a result of the broadcast, Silet presenter, Fenny Rose, was criticized by many people on social media on the internet for being inappropriate.

Silet presenter, Fenny Rose made a controversial statement. Among other things, she said that "Yogyakarta adalah kota malapetaka dan pada tanggal 8 November 2010 akan terjadi bencana besar." (English: Yogyakarta is the city of disasters and on November 8, 2010, there will be a major disaster.). Many people criticized that the statement was out of proportion and considered disturbing the public. The Indonesian Broadcasting Commission (KPI) was urged to intervene to give a reprimand or sanction.
