= Arzeti Bilbina =

Indonesian politician

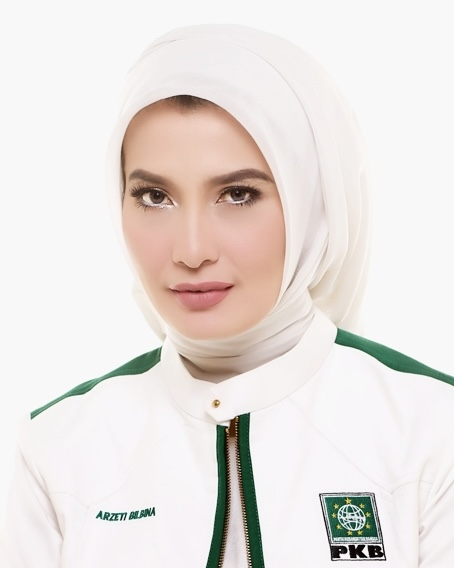
- Official portrait

Member of People's Representative Council
- Incumbent
- Assumed office 27 January 2015
- Constituency: East Java I

Personal details
- Born: Arzeti Bilbina Huzaimi Setiawan; 4 September 1974 (age 52) Krui, Lampung, Indonesia
- Party: National Awakening Party
- Parent: Huzaini Hakim (father)
- Education: National University
- Occupation: Model, actress and politician

Arzeti Bilbina Huzaimi Setiawan (born 4 September 1974) is an Indonesian model, actress and politician of Minangkabau descent who became a member of the 2019–2024 House of Representatives (DPR) of Republic of Indonesia (RI).

== Education ==
Arzeti received her early education at SMAN 6 Jakarta from 1989 to 1992; SMPN 1 Lampung from 1986 to 1989; and SDN 1 Lampung from 1980 to 1986. At National University, she undertook both Public Administration and Management and Management in Economics.

Arzeti was deemed to have passed the National University, Jakarta's Open Examination Session (Public Exam) for the Promotion of Doctor of Political science. The dissertation "Politik Kebijakan Anggaran dan Konflik Kepentingan Dalam Penanganan Covid-19 di Indonesia" by her was successfully defended. With six professorial promoters in attendance, she presented her dissertation.

== Career ==
=== Early career ===
At the age of 14, Arzeti began her modeling career. She moves between different fashion shows featuring well-known Indonesian and international designers. She toured hundreds of catwalk stages in different Indonesian cities during her decades-long career as a model. Even though she hasn't had much success in the acting field yet, she has attempted to further her potential there. She appeared in the soap opera Romantika as well as the television film Ajari Aku Cinta. Later on, it was thought that she was the face of multiple products.

In addition, Arzeti has presented at many events, including television program. Among her television appearances were as a host for the horror show Percaya Nggak Percaya. She then made her debut in the middle of 2007 as one of the judges of the reality series Mamamia Show, which was aired on the Indosiar television network, along with a number of other well-known Indonesians, such as Helmy Yahya, Ahmad Dhani, Vina Panduwinata, Tompi, and Ivan Gunawan.

=== Political career ===
Arzeti was not only involved in the entertainment industry but also serves as a representative for the National Awakening Party (PKB) in the DPR RI from 2014 to 2019 and from 2019 until 2024. On 27 January 2015, she joined the DPR-RI following Imam Nahrawi's election to the Working Cabinet position of Minister of Youth and Sports.

Arzeti, Cornelia Agatha and Arist Merdeka Sirait, decided to mark plastic products that contains Bisphenol A (BPA(+). This agreement was reached on 13 December 2022. She also has aimed to fight for the health rights of unborn children, pregnant mothers, and fetuses. She has particularly highlighted the significance of BPA labeling on potentially hazardous refill bottles. "There won't be another figure like him (Arist Merdeka). We are fortunate to have a living example of his fight for children," she stated in conjunction to the death of an activist, Arist Merdeka Sirait, on 11 September 2023.

According to Arzeti on 8 June 2023, Indonesia's health problems are currently at an emergency level. The rationale was that, in comparison to other ASEAN nations, Indonesia now has a relatively poor health index. At number 101 out of 149 countries in the world, Indonesia has a very low standing. She continued, "This condition is very bad." Furthermore, Indonesia's medical workforce was recognised as one the best medical staff in the world, with a quality rating of 139 out of 194 countries.

She was reelected in 2024 with 62,790 votes.

== Political positions ==
According to Arzeti, artists and art workers have three selling factors that they might use to their advantage while seeking public office. According to her, artists and art workers can help political parties get support from voters and win elections by selling their work. She does not, however, dispute that an artist's ability to succeed in politics was a result of her own diligence. Additionally, she stated that before to entering politics, she received training or a briefing from the political party she supported.

== Personal life ==
Arzeti, the fifth of the Minangkabau nomad family's seven children, was born in Lampung on 4 September 1974. The mother is from Bukittinggi, and the father is from Batusangkar.

Arzeti married Aditya Setiawan, a businessman on 2 February 2004. They have three children.

Arzeti has had to give up her free time for a while because she was filming for a local private TV station. She runs the modeling school Zema Management and the Muslim clothing company Arzeti Bilbina Collection.

== Electoral history ==
Election	Legislative institution	Constituency	Political party	Votes	Results
2019	People's Representative Council of the Republic of Indonesia	East Java I	National Awakening Party	53,185	Elected
2024	People's Representative Council of the Republic of Indonesia	East Java I	National Awakening Party	62.793	Elected
