= Keith Foo =

Malaysian actor and model

Keith Foo 富全进 ஃபூ குவான்ஜின்
- Born: Foo Chuan Chin; 6 January 1983 (age 43); Gemas, Negeri Sembilan, Malaysia
- Occupations: Actor and model
- Years active: 2006–present
- Children: 1

Foo Chuan Chin (born 6 January 1983), also known as Keith Foo, is a Malaysian actor who has worked in Indonesia and Malaysia. Some of the films that involve him are Mati Suri (2009), Paku Kuntilanak, Bidadari Jakarta (2010), Pengantin Pantai Biru (2010) and X - The Last Moment (2011). In 2013, he started acting in Malaysia and Indonesia. He is also the Founder and Creative Director of Aksi+Reaktivasi. Promoter of Human Rights and education for Arts and Creativity.

== Biography ==
Keith Foo was born on 6 January 1983 in Gemas, Negeri Sembilan to a mixed Chinese and Indian family. He has established his career first in the Indonesian film industry for more than a decade and is now expanding his acting career in Malaysia. His name became massively popular in his latest Malaysian drama Ariana Rose which featured him playing a Muslim. In Ariana Rose, Foo played the role of Tengku Adam Kamil. According to him, he not only brought the character to life, but indirectly he was also able to learn a little about Islam. The character is a Muslim and requires him to pray and read the Al-Quran and this at the same time causes some people to feel uneasy considering that Keith is not a Muslim, while his acting career was concentrated in Indonesia, he had played the role of a Muslim several times.

Aside from taking on a variety of roles, Keith also dabbled in publishing. Keith's interests, however, are not limited to the creative world. He also has an entrepreneurial streak and a high interest in the food and beverage industry, which can be generated from when he studied in the field of Hotel Management. He is also fluent in Chinese (Mandarin, Hainanese and Cantonese), Tamil, Malay, English and Indonesian.

== Filmography ==
=== Modelling clips ===
- Hati Yang Kau Sakiti - Rossa
- Jika Cinta Dia - Geisha

=== Indonesia ===
==== Films ====
- Mati Suri (2009)
- Paku Kuntilanak (2009)
- Bidadari Jakarta (2010)
- Pengantin Pantai Biru (2010)
- Akibat Pergaulan Bebas 2 (2011)
- X - The Last Moment (2011)
- Hantu Budeg (2012)
- Perempuan di Rumah Angker (2012)

==== Sinetron ====
- Serpihan
- Cinta Indah
- Cinta dan Anugerah (2010)
- Sinar (2010)
- Gol
- Bintang Untuk Baim (2011)

=== Malaysia ===
==== Drama ====
Year	Title	Character	TV channel	Notes
2013	Dalam Setiap Sujud	Hendra	TV9	
2013	Love You Mr. Arrogant	Hadry Hakimi	TV3	
2013	Ariana Rose	Tengku Adam Kamil	TV3	
2013	Jodoh Itu Milik Kita	Joshua	Astro Mustika HD	
2014	Kasih Berbisik	Dharma	TV3 Mediacorp Suria	
2015	Dia...Isteri Luar Biasa	Kamarul @ Che Kem	TV3	
2015	Keluarga Pontimau	Eddie	TV3	
2015	Andai Bumi Tulip Takdirku	Petar	TV Alhijrah	
2016	Jom Kahwin	Adam	HyppTV	
2018	Jangan Padam Rindu	Akid Fauzan	TV1	
2019	Kereta Sewa		TV3	
2019	Mimpi Yang Sempurna	Zaki	TV1	
2020	KL Gangster: Underworld 2	Tony M	Iflix	
2021	A.I in Love	Bos Iskandar	RTM	
2021	Yang Bakal Mati Ramadan Ini	Mikhail	Awesome TV	
2021	Wifi Sebelah Rumah	Fizi	Disney+ Hotstar	
2021	Malaysian Ghost Stories	Jason	Astro Ria	Episode: “Nu Gui”
2021	Diari Seorang Suami	Azman	TV3	
2022	Air Mata Allisya	Daniel Arief	TV9	
2022	Tarik Aku Ke Syurga	Shawn	TV3	
2022	Dia Bukan Bidadari	Fareez Azeem	TV1	
2022	Demi	Fairul	TV Okey	
2022	Di Sebalik Dia	Iskandar	Awesome TV	
2023	Sekali Aku Bahagia	Muaz	TV3	
2023	4 Musim Cinta	Jamal	TV Okey	
2023	Bintang	Mustafa	TV3	

==== Film ====
- Demi Kamu Cinta (2013) with Erra Fazira and Nasha Aziz as Indra
- Lara Qaseh (2013) with Azlee Khairi and Sara Ali as Dr Hatta
- Perempuan Lindungan Kaabah (2014) bersama Sharnaaz Ahmad and Diana Danielle as Alex
- Tollgate Asmara (2014) with Izara Aishah as Danny
- Hanya Di Atas Kertas (2014) with Izreen Azminda and Nabila Huda as Azlan
- Pilot Cafe (2015) (Filem Adaptasi Novel) with Fahrin Ahmad dan Izara Aishah as Kapten Harris
- Girlfriend Kontrak (2015) with Risteena Munim as Umar
- Jelmaan (2015) with Raja Ilya as Harun
- Langit Cinta (2016) with Nur Fazura as Aliff Zulkarnain
- Aku Bukan Spy (2016) with Siti Saleha
- Cinta Selawat (2017) with Fatimah Az-Zahra as Dr Jason
- Maduku Telefon Bimbit (2017) with Siti Saleha as Salman
- Cinta Ajari Aku (2020) with Raja Ilya as Khad
- Cinta Segera (2020) with Doria Rachel Jolly as Harry
- Autumn in Wales (2022) with Eyka Farhana as Darwish

== Awards and nominations ==
Year	Awards	Category	Nomination	Result
2014	Anugerah Stail EH!	Male Celebrities with a Fit Body	Keith Foo	Won
2014	Anugerah Melodi Galaksi Rap	Featured Male Artist	Keith Foo	TBD
