= Djoehana Wiradikarta =

Doctor and academic from Indonesia

Raden Moehamad Djoehana Wiradikarta
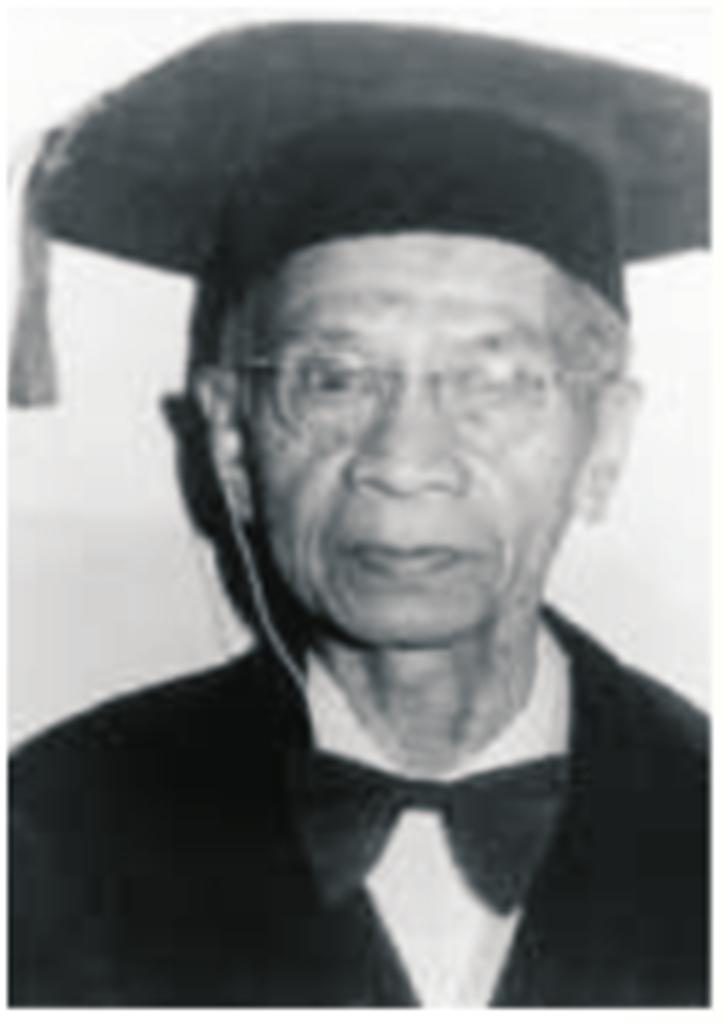
- Occupation(s): Professor in microbiology and serology

Raden Moehamad Djoehana Wiradikarta (born 18 September 1896 in Bandung, Indonesia – died in 1986 in Bandung) was a professor in microbiology and serology at the Bandung Institute of Technology and the faculty of medicine at Padjadjaran University, also in Bandung. He played a significant role in the development of the Indonesian higher education system.

He was also one of the founders of Padjadjaran University, in particular its faculty of medicine. He was the first native Indonesian to be appointed to the position of dean of the faculty of sciences at the University of Indonesia in Bandung in 1957. He is also one of the founders of private university Universitas Nasional. Djoehana was one of five members of the committee for the establishment of the Indonesian Red Cross.

== Biography ==
Djoehana was born in what was the Dutch East Indies. His father, Raden Rangga Wiradikarta, was wedana ("subdistrict head") of Majalaya south of Bandung, and belonged to the Sundanese nobility, as did his mother. Djoehana attended STOVIA (School tot Opleiding van Inlandsche Artsen, "school for the training of native physicians") and graduated in 1918. He was then appointed as a district physician in Bawean Island. After that he held various positions in the colonial government health system, in various cities in Sumatra and Java.

In 1930, he was sent to Amsterdam University in the Netherlands, where he got his "European" Doctor of Medicine degree the following year. Back in the Netherlands Indies, he was the director of the public hospital of Ambarawa in Central Java when Japanese troops landed in 1942. During the Japanese occupation of the Dutch East Indies, Djoehana was deputy director of the laboratory of the Eijkman Institute in Jakarta.

On 17 September 1945, exactly one month after the proclamation of Indonesian Independence, Djoehana was appointed to a committee with five members formed by President Sukarno to establish the Indonesian Red Cross.

In 1947, Djoehana was appointed gewoon hoogleraar ("university professor") at what was to become the faculty of medicine of the University of Indonesia in 1950. From 1951 to 1954, he was head of the Landskoepokinrichting, which was renamed (1950–60) Pasteur Institute of Indonesia, and then (1960) became the state-owned pharmaceutical company PT Bio Farma. He was the first native Indonesian to head this organization, having been in existence since colonial times.

In 1953, he was appointed "professor extraordinary" in microbiology and serology at the Faculty of Sciences, the University of Indonesia in Bandung, established in 1950. (Note: In 1959 the Faculty of Sciences and the Faculty of Engineering, including the Academy of Arts, were separated from the University of Indonesia, of which the Rectorate was seated in Jakarta, and amalgamated into the Bandung Institute of Technology)

In 1956, Djoehana was appointed vice-president of the foundation in charge of setting up a faculty of medicine at Padjadjaran University, of which he became the first dean (1957–1962). In 1957, he became the first native Indonesian to hold the position of dean, Faculty of Sciences, University of Indonesia in Bandung, replacing Dutch Professor H. Th. M. Leeman. This faculty was the last in Indonesia to still be headed by somebody from the Nederlands, because of difficulties in finding a qualified person required during the initial years of independence.

As dean of the Faculty of Sciences, Djoehana participated in the establishment of the Bandung Institute of Technology (ITB) in 1959 and was appointed a member of the Presidium of the ITB on 2 March 1959 until 1 November 1959 when Prof. Ir. R. O. Kosasih was appointed as Rector of ITB.

Djoehana was married to the sister of Sjahrir, the first prime minister of the Republic of Indonesia from 1945 to 1947, and founder of the Indonesian Socialist Party
