= Cinta dan Anugerah =

- Created by: SinemArt
- Directed by: Sanjeev Kumar
- Starring: Nabila Syakieb; Ashraf Sinclair; Miller; Eva Anindhita; Yasmine Wildblood; Giovanni Yosafat Tobing; Asha Shara
- Opening theme: KebesaranMu by ST 12
- Ending theme: KebesaranMu by ST 12
- Country of origin: Indonesia
- Original language: Indonesian
- No. of episodes: 244

Production
- Production location: Jakarta
- Running time: 60 minutes
- Production company: SinemArt

Original release
- Network: RCTI
- Release: June 1, 2009 – January 27, 2010

Cinta dan Anugerah (Love and Blessing) is an Indonesian TV serial that was aired on RCTI. It was produced video productions house public distributor company network by SinemArt directed by Sanjeev Kumar.

== Cast ==
- Nabila Syakieb as Nabila/Yasmin
- Ashraf Sinclair as Reza
- Miller as Avian/Tengku Jamal
- Eva Anindhita as Chintya
- Yasmine Leeds Wildblood as Aira
- Giovanni Yosafat Tobing as Gio
- Richard Kevin as Alvino
- Wilda Hamid as Mini
- Raya Kohandi as Zaskia
- Ibnu Jamil as Bima
- Cut Sarah as Saira
- Vonny Cornellya Permatasari as Harris
- Asha Shara as Hani
- Adipura as Harris
- Teuku Mirza as Krisna
- Marcell Darwin as Aldi
- Luna Maya as Luna
- Tri Ningtyas as Faridah
- Keith Foo as Rama
- Adjie Pangestu as Raffi
- Amanda William as Amanda
- Dirly as Bayu
- Donny Damara as Imran
- Hanna Hasyim as Halimah
- Anna Tarigan as Sara
- Kevin Julio as Soni

== Synopsis ==
Nabila (Nabila Syakieb), a simple, kind, and beautiful girl, lives with her two sisters, Aira (Yasmine Wildblood) and Mini (Wilda Hamid). Despite the strong contrast in character, three of them always get along. Life hasn't been easy for them. They have to lose their only valuables, their house, to pay up their late father's debt. Their father only left them with a note saying that they have a relative named Reza (Ashraf Sinclair), a rich businessman. Their arrival was not well received by Reza. But after reading the note, a cold and handsome Reza accepted them into his house under one condition. They have to work. Reza's sister, Saira (Cut Sarra), who also lives there with her children, Chintya (Eva Anindita), Ryan (Giovani L. Tobing) and Soni (Kevin Julio) were not too happy with Nabilla's arrival. Especially once they found out that Avian (Miller), Reeza's right hand man, was falling for Aira. Not only did Avian fell for Aira, but also so did Reza. Not knowing that in fact, Nabilla was secretly in love with Reza. But Nabilla can never break her sister's heart. How will her life turn out? Will she ever conquer Reza's heart?
