= Jansen Ibrahim Silaen =

Indonesian politician and police officer

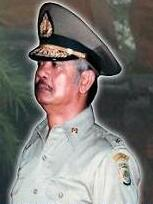

Member of the People's Representative Council
- In office 1 October 1987 – 19 May 1997
- President: Suharto
- Parliamentary group: Armed Forces (1st term); Golkar (2nd term)
- Constituency: Irian Jaya (2nd term)

Personal details
- Born: August 7, 1931 North Tapanuli, Sumatra, Dutch East Indies
- Died: May 19, 1997 (aged 65) Jakarta, Indonesia
- Resting place: Kalibata Heroes' Cemetery
- Party: Golkar
- Spouse: Dameria Margaretha P. Simanjuntak
- Children: 5

Military service
- Allegiance: Indonesia
- Branch/service: Indonesian Police
- Years of service: 1962—1986
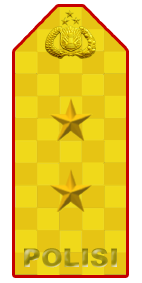
- Rank: Major General
- Unit: Investigation (Reserse)

Jansen Ibrahim Silaen (7 August 1931 – 19 May 1997) was an Indonesian politician and police officer who became the Police Chief of North Sulawesi and Central Sulawesi and Head of the Criminal Investigation Agency. After retiring from the police, he became a politician and served for two terms in the People's Representative Council until his death.

== Early life and education ==
Jansen was born on 7 August 1931 in North Tapanuli. He attended elementary school at the Hollandsch-Inlandsche School (Dutch schools for natives) but was forced to dropped out at the 4th grade due to the Japanese occupation of the Dutch East Indies. He then continued his 5th and 6th grade in the People's School and finished in 1944. Afterwards, he studied at a junior high school where he graduated in 1948 and at a high school where he graduated in 1952. Jansen fought against the Dutch forces during Operation Product and Operation Kraai during this period.

Jansen moved from North Tapanuli to Yogyakarta to pursue higher education and attended the Social Political Faculty of the Gadjah Mada University. He graduated with a degree in 1952. Afterwards, he enrolled at the Academy of Police Sciences in 1962 and became a Police Commissioner Attendant.

In the midst of his career as a police, Jansen enrolled at the Law Faculty of the 17 August University. He graduated in 1966 with a doctorandus degree in law.

== Police career ==
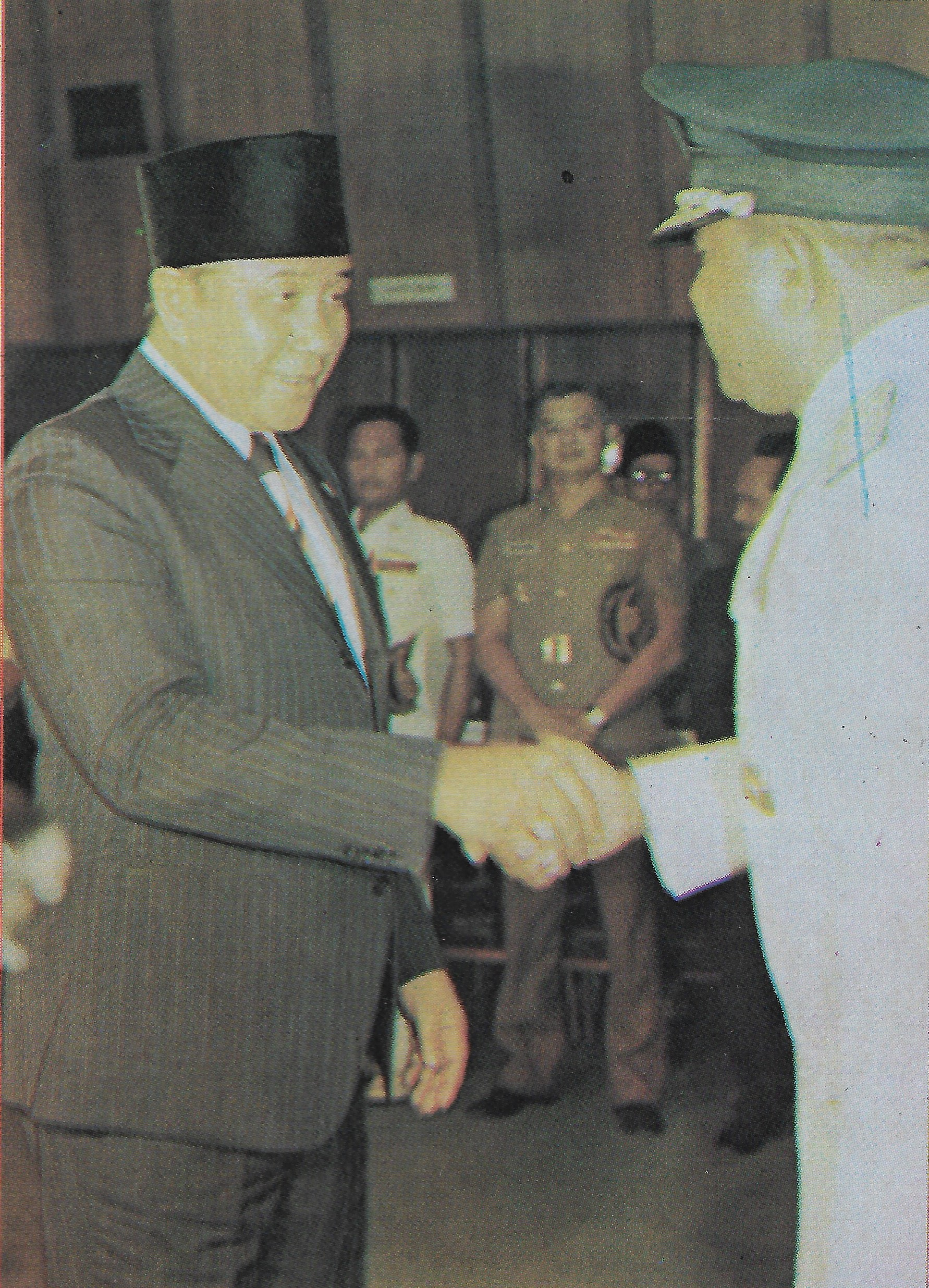
Jansen (background, holding a peaked cap) at the inauguration of Elias Paprindey as the Vice Governor of Irian Jaya.

Silaen was made as the head of a section in Jakarta police's research directorate in 1962. Three years later, he was made as the head of the research directorate. He was then rotated to the Irian Jaya police, where he became the personal assistant to the police chief Suradi Permana from 1969 and 1970 and supervisory and education assistant from 1970 and 1973. He then became the acting police chief of Irian Jaya for several months after Suradi was transferred to West Java. Silaen then became the inspector of the Irian Jaya police from 1973 until 1975 and the chief of staff (now renamed to deputy police chief) from 1975 before returning to Jakarta. During his final months in Irian Jaya, Silaen was responsible for securing the 1977 legislative elections.

After his arrival in Jakarta, Silaen was made as the chief of staff of the Jakarta police on 22 September 1977. A year later, Jansen was appointed by Major General Norman Sasono as the Deputy Commander of Task Force 378, a task force with the responsibility of securing the 1978 General Session of the People's Consultative Assembly. He served as chief of staff for another three years until he was transferred to North Sulawesi.

On 10 March 1981, Silaen was made as the Police Chief of North Sulawesi and Central Sulawesi. He held the office for a brief period, as on 15 January 1982 he handed the office to Bobby Rachman. He returned to Jakarta and served as the Commander of the Investigation Command of the Indonesian National Police.

Following the reorganization of the national police, Silaen's post was renamed as the Investigation Director of the Indonesian National Police in 1985. He was replaced from the office on 4 September 1986 by Soedjadi. He officially retired from the police with the rank of major general shortly afterwards.

== Member of the People's Representative Council ==
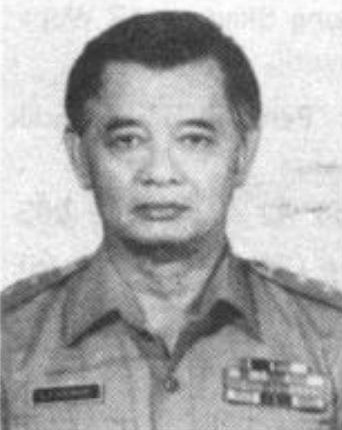
Jansen as a member of the People's Representative Council

After his retirement, Jansen became member of the People's Representative Council through appointment from the Armed Forces. He was assigned to the Commission VII, which handles energy, research, and technology.

In 1991, he decided to run as a Golkar candidate from the Irian Jaya constituency and was elected to a second term. In his second term, he was reassigned to the Commission I, which handles defense, foreign affairs, communications and informatics, and intelligence. He died on 19 May 1997, just a few months before the end of his second term. He was buried at the Kalibata Heroes' Cemetery.

== Awards ==
- Public Security and Order Medal (Indonesian: Satyalancana Jana Utama)
- Military Operations Service Medal I (Indonesian: Satyalancana G.O.M I)
- Wounded Medal (Indonesian: Satyalancana Bhakti)
- Guerrilla Star (Indonesian: Bintang Gerilya)
- Military Operations Service Medal IX (Indonesian: Satyalancana Raksaka Dharma)
- Medal for Combat Against Communists (Indonesian: Satyalancana Penegak)
- Military Operations Service Medal V (Indonesian: Satyalancana G.O.M V)
- National Police Meritorious Service Star, 3rd Class (Indonesian: Bintang Bhayangkara Nararya)
- National Police Meritorious Service Star, 2nd Class (Indonesian: Bintang Bhayangkara Pratama) (10 May 1991)

== Personal life ==
Jansen was a Protestant Christian. He was married to Dameria Margaretha P. Simanjuntak. The couple had five children.
