= Han Groenewegen =

Dutch architect (1888–1980)

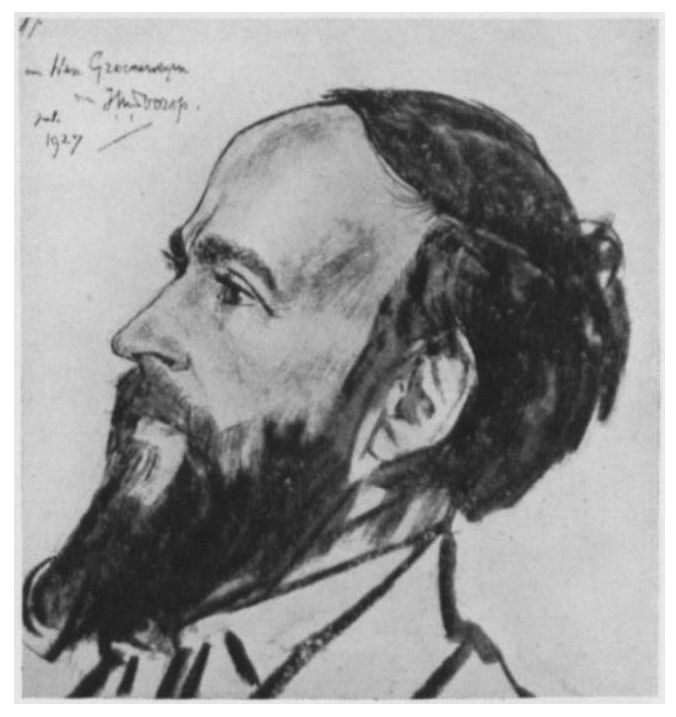
Han Groenewegen by Jan Toorop, 1927.

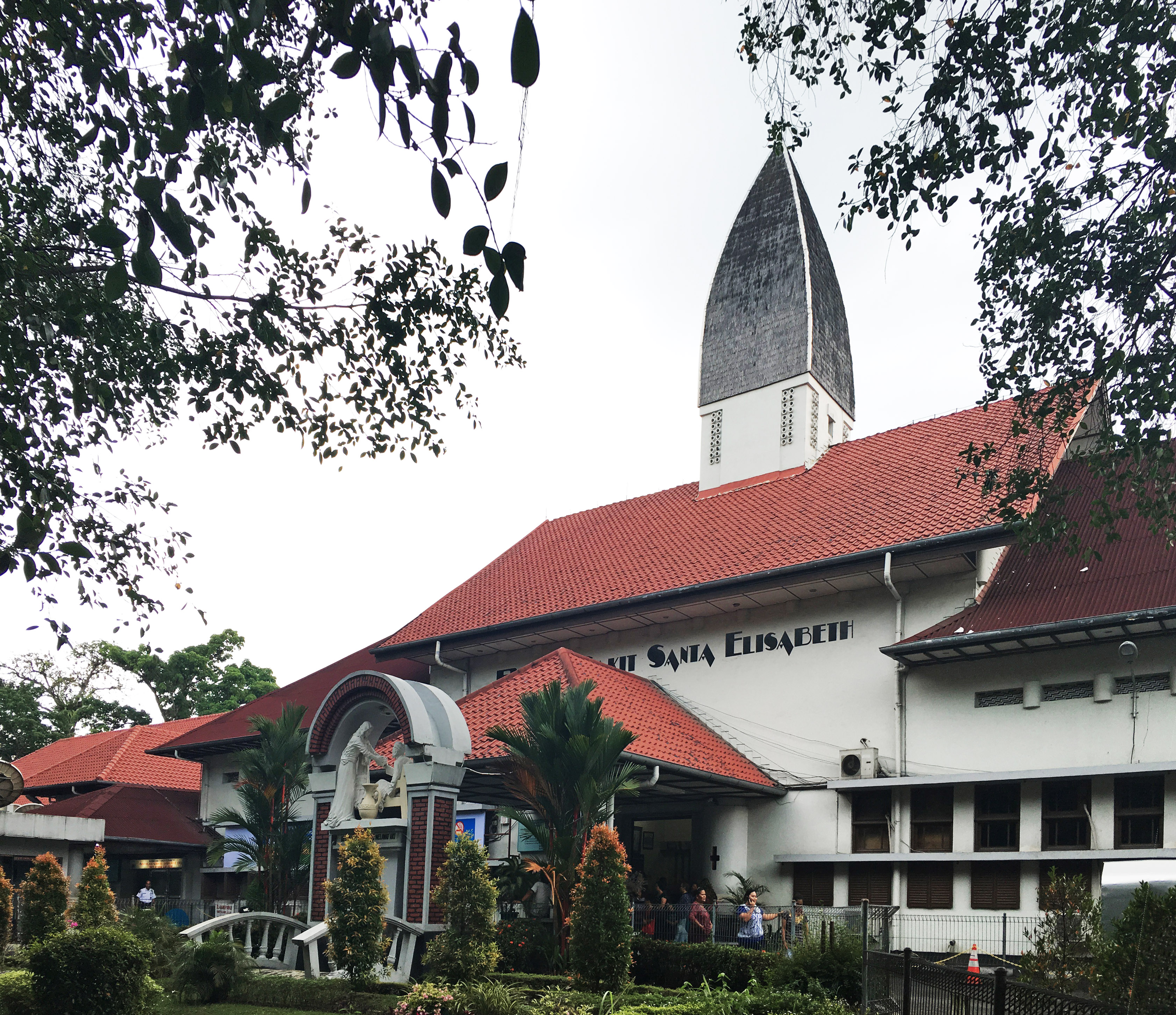
Medan's St. Elisabeth's Hospital is among Groenewegen's earliest work in the Indies.

Johannes Martinus (Han) Groenewegen (27 October 1888 (The Hague) – 4 April 1980 (Jakarta)) was a Dutch architect who was active in the Netherlands and the Dutch East Indies, and subsequently, Indonesia from the 1920s to the 1960s.

== Biography ==
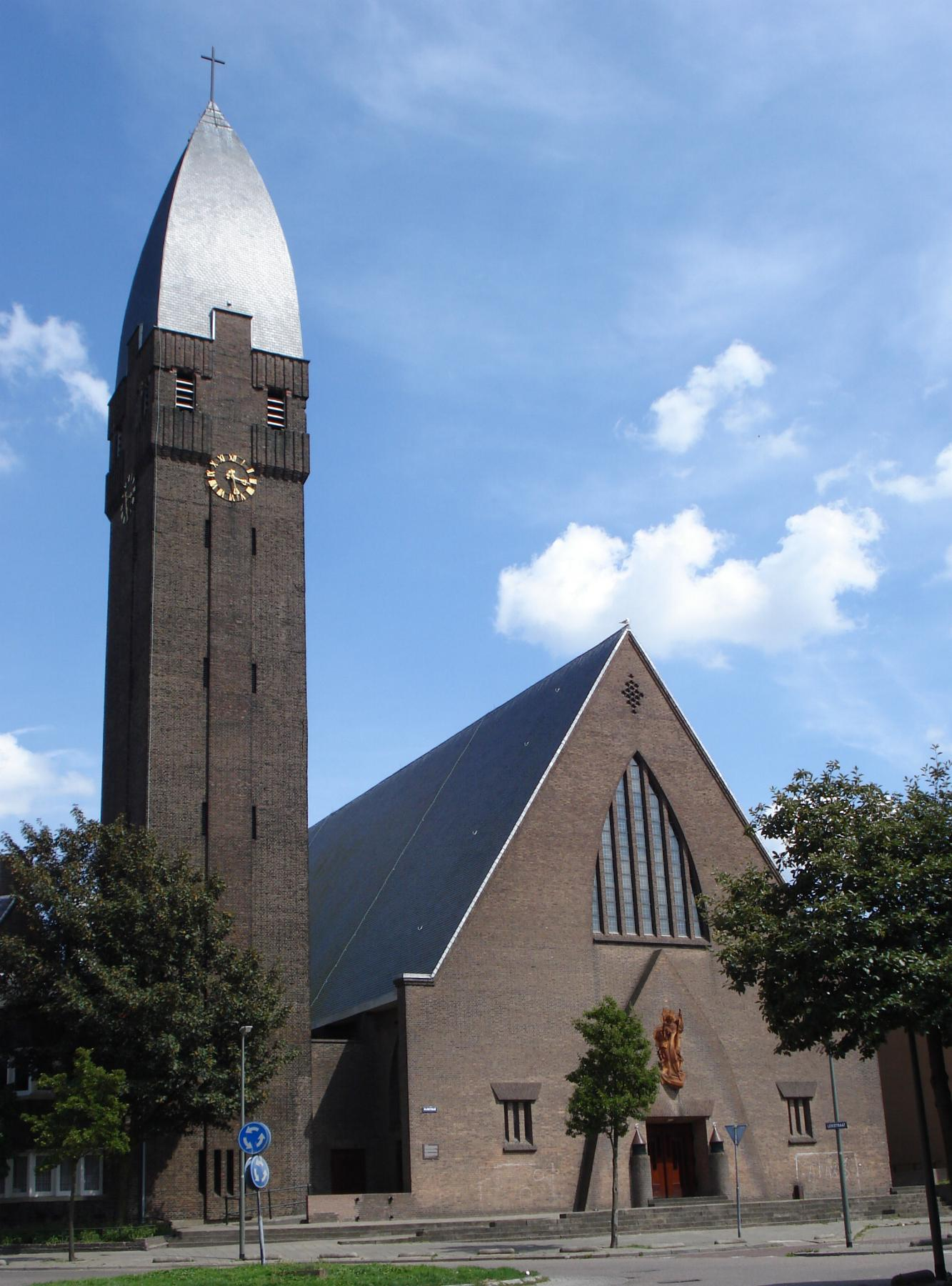
The Roman catholic Church of the Holy Heart of Jesus in Schiedam, among Groenewegen's early work in the Netherlands.

Han Groenewegen worked in the Hague as a freelance architect from 1920 to 1927. Before establishing his own firm, he used to work for the contractor R. Rutgers in the Hague. One of his few works in the Netherlands is the Church of the Holy Heart of Jesus in Schiedam. During the Great Depression, Groenewegen left the Netherlands to establish his own new firm in the Dutch East Indies. Many other architects were left for the Indies during the period, e.g. Albert Aalbers. Groenewegen arrived in Medan (on the island of Sumatra) in 1927 to work on the plan for a hospital, the St. Elisabeth's Hospital (1929-1930). He was active in Medan from 1927 to 1942 to work for the Oostkust. Like Schoemaker for the city of Bandung, Gronewegen can be considered as representative of modernist Nieuwe Bouwen in Medan. Among Groenewegen's extensive portfolio in Medan are the expansion of Medan Cathedral (1928), Arnhem Insurance (now the Museum of TNI Struggles, 1930), the Roman Catholic Chinese church in Polonia (1934), Princess Beatrix School (now Immanuel Christian School, 1938), Medan swimming pool (1939), and Oranjeschool (1941). Unlike many of his colleagues, however, Groenewegen remained in Indonesia following the independence of the country.

After the war, Groenewegen moved to Jakarta from 1947. Shortly after the war, he worked on the central reconstruction plans. One of the first buildings designed by Groenewegen in Jakarta is the Menteng Cinema in Javaweg (1949-1950, now demolished). Other designs in Jakarta are the houses for the Java Bank (1952), Sumber Waras hospital in Grogol (1957), a crematorium (1958) and the Dutch embassy and chancery (1960 and 1966). From 1957, Groenewegen worked in association with Indonesian architect F. Silaban, e.g. for Bank Indonesia in Jakarta. He also worked as an architecture lecturer. Groenewegen died in April 1980 in the hospital Sumber Waras he designed.

Groenewegen also had several works outside Medan and Jakarta, e.g. the Sumber Waras hospital in Padang (1956-1957), Savoy cinema in Bukittinggi (1957), and Museum Seni Modern in Bali (1959).

== Design philosophy ==
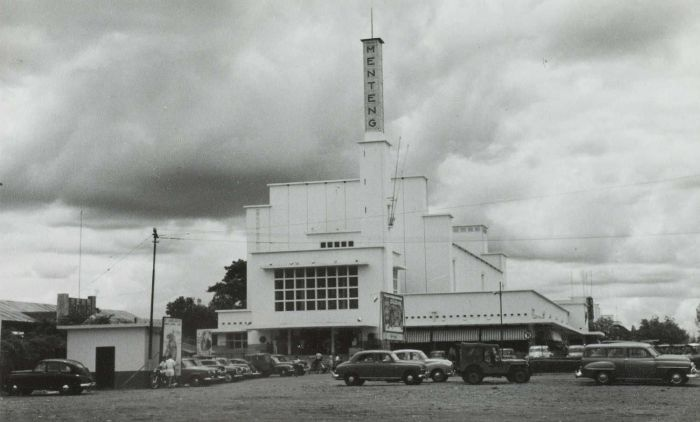
Menteng Cinema in Javaweg, then demolished

Groenewegen was heavily influenced by the principle of Amsterdam School. While staying and working in Indonesia, Groenewegen began to incorporate Indies architectural element in his works.

== See also ==
- List of colonial buildings in Medan for his works in Medan.

== Cited works ==
- Akihary, Huib (1990). Architectuur & Stedebouw in Indonesië 1870/1970. Zutphen: De Walburg Pers. ISBN 9072691024.
- Het Indische bouwen: architectuur en stedebouw in Indonesie : Dutch and Indisch architecture 1800-1950. Helmond: Gemeentemuseum Helmond. 1990.
- Leushuis, Emile (2011). Gids historische stadswandelingen Indonesië [Guide historic city tours Indonesia] (in Dutch). Amsterdam: KIT Publishers. ISBN 9789460221620. Archived from the original on March 7, 2016.
- Loderichs, M.A. (November 1997). Medan - Beeld van een stad [Medan - Pictures of a city] (in Dutch). Purmerend: Asia Maior. ISBN 9074861105.
- Widodo, Johannes. "Medan: The Advent of a North Sumatran Modern City". Medan Heritage. Sumatra Heritage Trust. Archived from the original on 24 December 2015.
