= Menteng Cinema =

- Bioskop Menteng
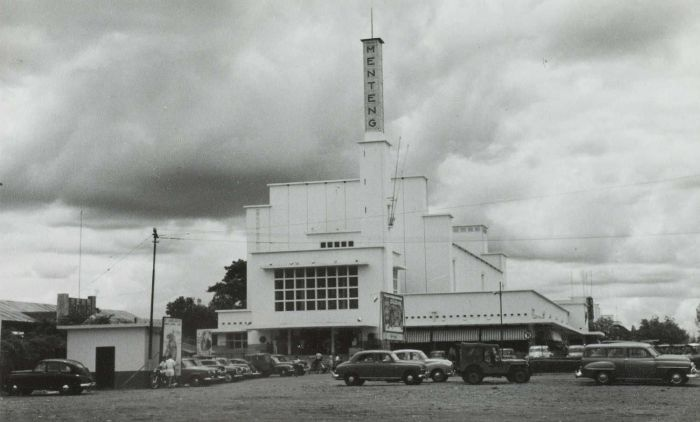
- Menteng Cinema in the 1950s

- Location within Jakarta

General information
- Status: Demolished
- Type: cinema
- Architectural style: Nieuwe Bouwen, Nieuwe Zakelijkheid
- Location: Jakarta, Indonesia
- Coordinates: 6°11′0″S 106°50′3″E
- Construction started: 1949
- Opened: 1950
- Demolished: 1988

Other information
- Seating capacity: 1,100

Website
- www.jakarta.go.id

Menteng Cinema (Indonesian Bioskop Menteng, Dutch Bioscoop Menteng) was a cinema in Jakarta, Indonesia. The cinema was designed by Dutch architect J.M. Groenewegen in 1949, one of the architect who was active in Indonesia before and after the World War II. Menteng Cinema is Groenewegen's first cinema project, which would give birth to several other cinemas in Indonesia which has the same architectural style of Nieuwe Bouwen. Menteng Cinema was demolished in 1988, standing above the site now is the Menteng Huis shopping complex.

== Design ==
Menteng cinema was designed by Dutch architect J.M. Groenewegen. Han Groenwegen was among many Dutch people who moved to the Indies to avoid the Great Depression in Europe. Groenewegen continued as an architect in the Indies when he established a consultant in Medan, Sumatra. Groenewegen was very active in Medan between 1927 until the War. Like many Dutch nationalities in Indonesia, he was placed in a Japanese internment camp. After the war, Groenewegen decided to move to Jakarta. Unlike many of his colleagues, Groenewegen remained in Indonesia following the independence of the country.

The Menteng Cinema of Jakarta is among Groenewegen's first project in Jakarta. The Menteng Cinema is also Groenewegen's first cinema project. His design for the cinema is greatly influenced by the work of Willem Dudok e.g. the Town Hall of Hilversum, but conformed to the tropical climate of Jakarta. The cinema building has a seating capacity of 1,088. The building boasted six "exhausters" to regulate air quality inside the building, an early form of air conditioning. The cinema featured a large Balinese mural in its spacious main hall, a bar, a café-restaurant with terrace, and a powder room. There were several classes of seating with tickets priced accordingly.

Following the completion of Menteng Cinema, Groenewegen received other professional works for cinema in Indonesia. Four of his designs for cinema was realized, among them Olympia Bioscoop in Medan (1952) and Sovya Bioscoop of Bukittinggi (1957), both cinemas have a very similar design with the Menteng Cinema.

Menteng Cinema was one of the cinemas named "Menteng" during the 1950s, the other Menteng Cinema was located on Jalan Cokroaminoto and was built in 1947.

== Cited works ==
- Merrillees, Scott (2015). Jakarta: Portraits of a Capital 1950-1980. Jakarta: Equinox Publishing. ISBN 9786028397308.

== See also ==
- List of colonial buildings and structures in Jakarta
