= Putra Nababan =

Indonesian journalist

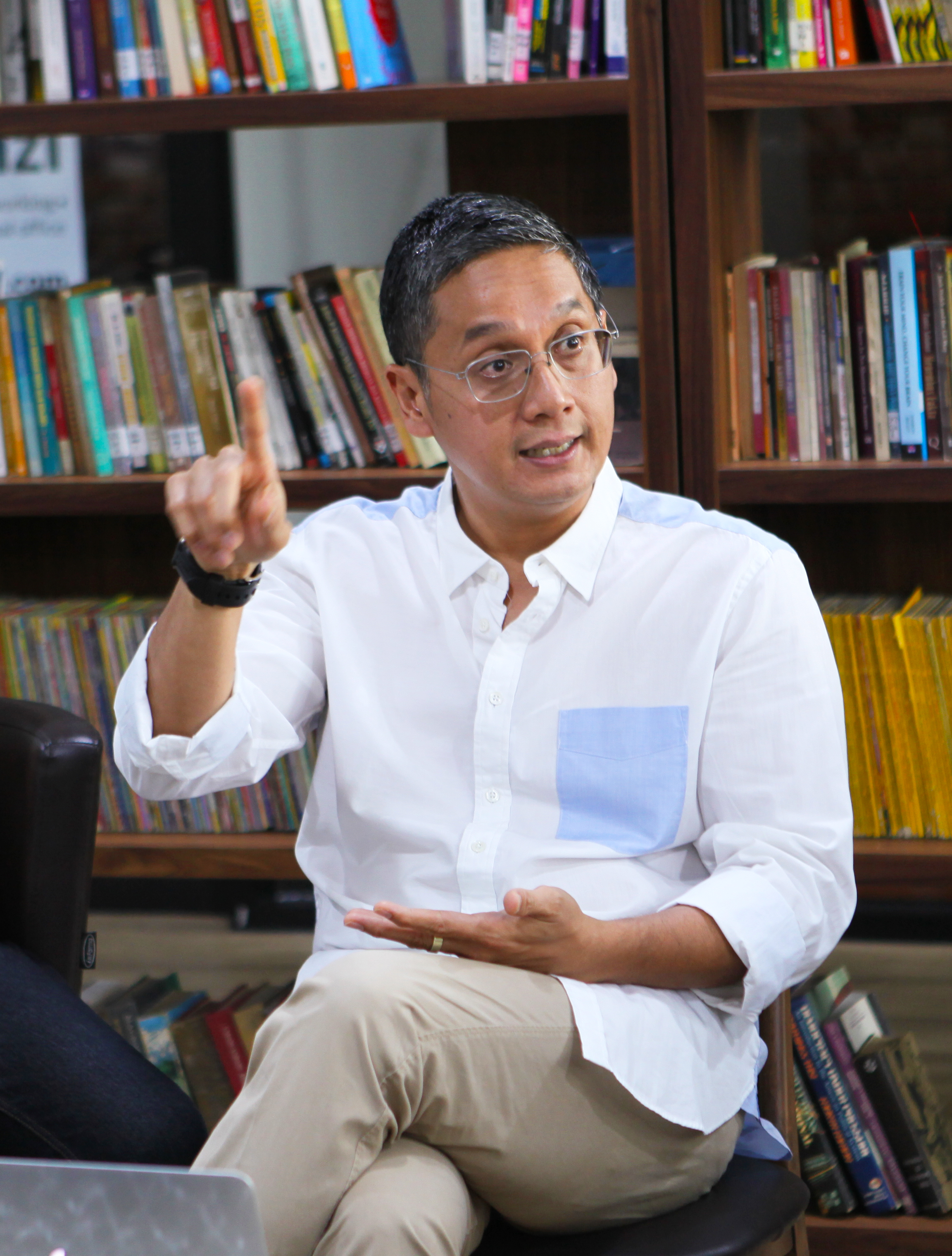
- Nababan in 2017

Member of the House of Representatives
- Incumbent
- Assumed office 1 October 2019
- Constituency: Jakarta I
- Majority: 105,559 (2024)

Personal details
- Born: James Parulian Putra Nababan; 28 July 1974 (age 52) Jakarta, Indonesia
- Party: PDI-P
- Spouse: Mira Maria Melati Sirait
- Children: Aubriel Mutiara Aza Nababan; Gabriel Indonesia Prinz Nababan
- Occupation: Journalist; News presenter; Politician
- Awards: 2009 Panasonic Awards for Best News Presenter; 2010 Panasonic Gobel Awards for Best News Presenter; 2011 Panasonic Gobel Awards for Best News Presenter; 2012 Panasonic Gobel Awards for Best News Presenter

James Parulian Putra Nababan, commonly known as Putra Nababan (born 28 July 1974) is an Indonesian newsreader, journalist, and politician. He has served in the House of Representatives representing Jakarta's 1st electoral district since 2019. He was editor-in-chief of MetroTV. He has received four Panasonic Gobel awards.

== Early life and education ==
Nababan was born with the name James Parulian Putra Nababan in Jakarta on 28 July 1974. According to his parents Panda Nababan and Ria Purba, the name James is used abroad, Parulian is used in his hometown, Putra is used throughout Indonesia, and Nababan is his family name. He is the second of three children.

Nababan moved to Sioux City, Iowa, United States, in 1988 to continue his studies through a student exchange. He graduated from high school in one year. Influenced by his father, he chose to be a journalist. He enrolled in the Department of Journalism of Midland Lutheran College, Fremont, Nebraska, at the age of 16. He graduated three years later. During his time in college, he held a part-time job as a security guard for two years.

== Career ==
After returning to Indonesia, Nababan worked for Forum Keadilan magazine, Koran Merdeka (later renamed Rakyat Merdeka), and Metro TV. He has worked for RCTI since 2004.

In 2008, PDI Perjuangan offered to make him a legislative candidate for the party in the 2009 election, but he refused. In March 2010, he interviewed US president Barack Obama about his childhood in Indonesia.

Year	Career	Position
1992	YAKOMA Mass-communication-firm	Investigator
1994–1995	Forum Keadilan Magazine	Reporter
1995–2001	Rakyat Merdeka Newspaper	Managing Editor
2001–2004	Metro TV	Presenter, Chief Reporter
2005–2008	Trijaya Radio	Host program POLEMIK
2008–2012	RCTI TV	Deputy Chief Editor, News Anchor
2012–2017	Metro TV & metrotvnews	Editor in Chief of Metro TV; News Anchor; Editor in Chief of metrotvnews.com; CEO of metrotvnews.com; Advisor to CEO Metro TV
2016–present	idtalent	Founder & Chief Operating Officer of idtalent.id

In the 2019 Indonesian legislative election, Nababan ran as a PDI-P candidate from Jakarta's 1st electoral district and won a seat in the House of Representatives. He was reelected for a second term in the 2024 election with 105,559 votes.

== Awards ==
Nababan has received four Panasonic Gobel awards for Best News Presenter in 2009, 2010, 2011 and 2012.

== Personal life ==
Nababan and Mira Maria Melati Sirait dated for nine and a half years before marrying on 14 February 2004; together they have two children, named Aubriel Mutiara Aza Nababan and Gabriel Indonesia Prinz Nababan.
