= Putri Ayu Silaen =

Putri Ayu
- Putri Ayu Silaen

Background information
- Born: Putri Ayu Rosmei Silaen; 24 May 1997 (age 29)
- Origin: Medan, North Sumatra, Indonesia
- Genres: Pop, Classical
- Occupations: Singer
- Years active: 2010–present
- Label: Nagaswara
- influenced Sarah Brightman

Putri Ayu Silaen (born 24 May 1997), commonly known as Putri Ayu, is an Indonesian Soprano singer who previously dabbled in the pop genre.

She started her singing career at a young age by joining several singing competitions in North Sumatra. She began to sing classical songs when she joined the Pesparawi competition, a classical singing competition, in which she won a gold medal. After that, she became more interested in the classical genre and joined Indonesia Mencari Bakat, an Indonesian television talent show competition as a classical singer at age 12, where she became the runner-up. At age 14 Putri Ayu was chosen as one of the winners Born to Sing Asia – David Foster contest.

She has sung in the Netherlands, Singapore, China, Australia and Timor Leste. She also has sung at international events including the SEA Games, Bali Democracy Forum VI, and The 12th World Chinese Entrepreneurs Convention in Chengdu, China.

== Biography ==
Putri Ayu Silaen was born on 24 May 1997 at Sibolga, North Sumatra to Berlin Silaen and Suzana Pangaribuan. She has two older sisters named Junita Natasya Silaen and Revina R. Silaen. She also has a brother named Putra Mahamei Parasian Silaen. She attended Tarsisius 1 High School in Jakarta. Before following the IMB, she attended vocal lessons at San Vocal Music School Cantabile, Medan, under the guidance of Derta Purba. Later she studied with Bertha, Christopher Abimanyu, Catharina Leimena, Aning Katamsi and Binu Sukaman.

== Vocal ability ==
Putri Ayu tends to sing as a mezzo-soprano and the highest tone she usually achieves is A5. However, in songs such as "Bohemian Rhapsody", she was able to attain a Bb5. She has achieved C#6 (soprano) when she sang The Girl in 14G.
