= Komeng =

Indonesian comedian and politician (born 1970)

Alfiansyah Komeng

Senator for West Java
- Incumbent
- Assumed office 1 October 2024
- Constituency: West Java
- Majority: 5,399,699 (2024)

Personal details
- Born: Alfiansyah Bustami; 25 August 1970 (age 56) Jakarta, Indonesia
- Party: Independent
- Education: Sekolah Tinggi Ilmu Ekonomi Tribuana Bekasi
- Occupation: Actor; Comedian; Voice actor; Radio host; Television presenter; Politician
- Other names: Komeng; Alfiansyah Bustami; Alfiansyah Bustami Komeng

Alfiansyah Komeng (born Alfiansyah Bustami, 25 August 1970), referred to mononymously as Komeng, is an Indonesian comedian, actor, and politician. He is a member of the Regional Representative Council, representing West Java since October 2024. Komeng began to participate in comedy shows in 1989 and gained popularity as he featured in comedy shows throughout the 1990s. In the 2024 Indonesian general election, he ran as a senator and was elected with over 5 million votes, the most for any Indonesian senatorial candidate to date.

== Early life and education ==
Alfiansyah was born in Jakarta on 25 August 1970. He studied at a state elementary school in Citeureup, Bogor, before completing his middle and high school studies in Jakarta. After graduating from high school in 1989, he enrolled at the Indonesian Banking Academy, but did not complete his studies. He would later obtain a bachelor's degree from the Tribuana Economic Institute in Bekasi in 2018.

== Career ==
=== Entertainment ===
His initial venture into entertainment began in 1989 when he became a member of the comedy group Diamor. The group often performed at churches, and prior to joining, Komeng had been assisting them with stage design decor. In 1990, Alfiansyah along with Diamor featured in a TVRI comedy show as the group's first television appearance, and in 1992 the group had their own show at TPI. Alfiansyah initially went by the stage name "Simon", before adopting "Komeng". Komeng later left the group and in 1996 began featuring in his own show, Spontan, boosting his popularity. Since 1993, he has been a radio broadcaster. He continued to star in comedy shows, including Putri Duyung (2001), Lola & Liliput (2002), and Opera Van Java (2008), Komeng Acak Adul with Adul (2013) and among others. Komeng's first appearance in a film was in the 2008 adult comedy Anda Puas, Saya Loyo.

He was reportedly one of the highest-paid comedians in Indonesia. In a 2024 report made after he was elected, he valued his assets at Rp 15.7 billion (~USD 1 million), mostly in form of real estate in Bogor. Komeng several times featured in advertisements for Yamaha motorbikes, which also featured motorcycle racer Valentino Rossi. His catchphrase "Uhuy!", was first used when he appeared at Spontan.

=== Politics ===
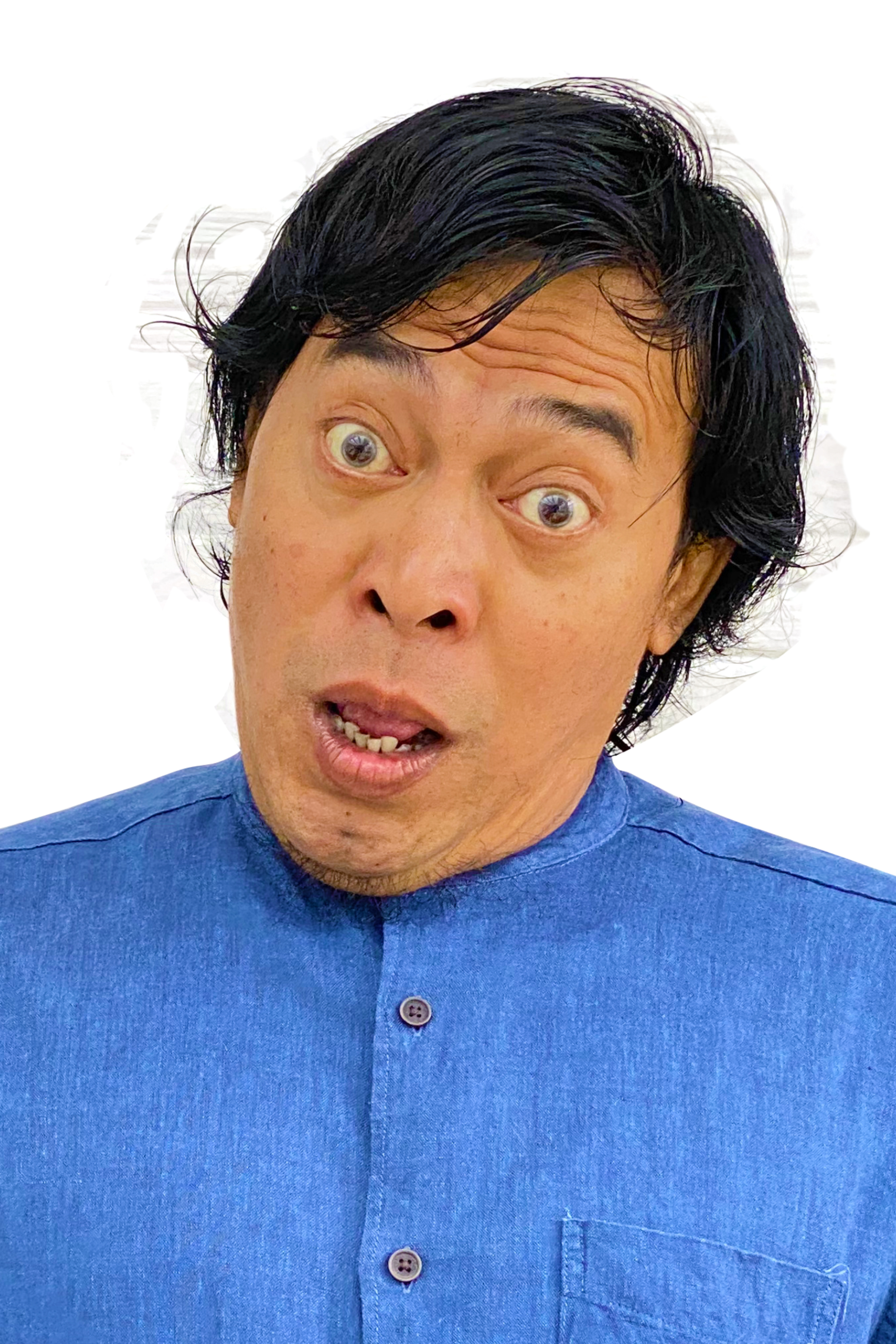
Komeng's election portrait, shown on ballots.

In the 2024 Indonesian legislative election, Komeng ran as a candidate for the Regional Representative Council from West Java. To improve his recognizability, he changed his legal name from Alfiansyah Bustami to Alfiansyah Komeng. In an interview, he noted that he maintained his birth name Alfiansyah in his new legal name to place his name at the top of the alphabetically-ordered ballot. His electoral portrait featured Komeng with googly eyes and an open mouth, which he intentionally selected to make him "look different and entertaining".

Komeng received nearly 5.4 million votes, by a wide margin the most votes among the 54 senatorial candidates in West Java, and the most received by any Indonesian senatorial candidate to date (the previous record, 4.1 million votes in 2019, was held by fellow comedian Oni Suwarman). During a plenary vote-counting meeting at the national level, participants were recorded to quip Komeng's "uhuy!" catchphrase when Komeng's vote tally was announced. Similar scenes were recorded during the vote counting in various polling stations in West Java.

In an interview, Komeng stated that he intended to promote a National Comedy Day as a senator, and to promote comedy as part of Indonesian culture abroad. Komeng's proposal was endorsed by fellow comedian-turned-politician Denny Cagur, who was elected into the House of Representatives. Komeng was sworn into office on 1 October 2024.

Komeng received criticism in 2025, when he made jokes related to an ongoing cooking gas shortage in an interview. In the aftermath of the Aceh–North Sumatra islands dispute in 2025, Komeng visited one of the disputed uninhabited small islands and called for development there. He also called for the Ministry of Forestry to reforest areas of West Java, in particular regions upstream of Jakarta, in order to reduce flooding in the city. He remarked in an interview that since being elected, he had had to "put brakes" on his habit of making jokes in public, and that some of his children noted that he earned less as a legislator than as a comedian.

== Personal life ==
Komeng married Apriliana Indra Dewi in 1999, and they had three children – triplets from in vitro fertilization born on 2 August 2006. Their sole daughter died in 2016. Their primary residence is in Sentul, Bogor Regency. He is of mixed Betawi-Sundanese descent, and is a Muslim.

Komeng volunteers for the Indonesian Red Cross in its Bogor Regency branch. Komeng also took part in the Komando Pasukan Lawak or KOPLAK, an Indonesian Red Cross group for psychosocial support services. In this capacity, Komeng took part in rehabilitation efforts after the 2018 Sulawesi earthquake and tsunami and the 2022 West Java earthquake in Cianjur. He continued this activity after his election, volunteering at a refugee camp in Padang following flooding and landslides caused by Cyclone Senyar.
