= Mamamia Show =

Indonesian singing contest reality television show

- Created by: Harry Nugroho
- Presented by: Stenny Agustaf; Ruben Onsu; Denny Cagur
- Judges: Helmi Yahya; Ahmad Dhani; Arzeti Bilbina
- Country of origin: Indonesia

Production
- Production locations: Various locations (Auditions); Various Locations (Spectacular Show), Jakarta Convention Center, Istora Senayan (Finale)
- Running time: 6 hours

Original release
- Network: Indosiar
- Release: 2007–2008; 2010; 2014–2015

Mamamia Show is an Indonesian singing contest reality television show broadcast on the Indonesian TV channel Indosiar.

Despite similarities, Mamamia Show is not a licensed version of the Idols format distributed by FremantleMedia.

Four seasons of Mamamia Show have been aired in Indonesia (2007, 2008, 2010, and 2014–2015).
