= Ranking 1 (Indonesian game show) =

- Presented by: Ruben Onsu; Sarah Sechan; Ruth Sahanaya (28 February 2011-4 March 2011); Cynthia Lamusu (21–25 March 2011)
- Starring: Sogi Indra Dhuaja; Mr. Tarno
- Country of origin: Indonesia
- Original language: Indonesian
- No. of episodes: 505

Original release
- Network: Trans TV
- Release: 5 July 2010 – 8 June 2012

Ranking 1 is an Indonesian game show. In this show, 80 contestants are competed to answering all questions correctly to become 2 strongest contestants to win Rp50.000.000,00 as a grand prize. This show is aired on Trans TV since 5 July 2010 until 8 June 2012, every Monday-Friday at 7.30 - 8.30 AM (UTC+7), and hosted by Ruben Onsu and Sarah Sechan.
On 28 February - 4 March 2011, Sarah Sechan as a host changed by Ruth Sahanaya. On 21–25 March 2011, Cynthia Lamusu changed Sarah Sechan as a host.
On March 27, 2012, Ruben Onsu has chosen as most favourite quiz host in Panasonic Gobel Awards 2012 event.

== Regulation ==
- Contestants must answer all the questions from the hosts correctly and do not cheat.
- Answers are written on a small whiteboard with a boardmarker.
- When the host says, lift the board now (lit. angkat papannya sekarang), it means all contestants cannot change their written answers anymore, and must lift them above their heads.
- Contestants who answered the questions correctly will continue the game, whereas contestants who answered incorrectly must end the game and leave the game arena.
- Contestants who violate the regulations will be warned (yellow card) or even directly disqualified (red card).
- If a contestant reaches the majority of offenders regulation of all the contestants who still persist, then the questions will be considered invalid.

== Game layout ==
=== Puzzle ===
- The answer is based on the song to be played.
- To be given instructions relating to the songs played.

=== Practicum ===
- Sung by Mr. Sogi Indra Dhuaja and Tarno.
- Questions are based on experiments with laboratory equipment.

=== Quiz ===
- The question is given by the respondents through the video.
- The questions related to general knowledge.

=== I Want to Know ===
- Hosted by Sogi Indra Dhuaja.
- Questions are based on the video.

=== Fast-Right ===
- The answer according to the instructions read by the emcee.
- One contestant to answer correctly and quickly lift the board answers (based on the monitoring camera) will come out as winners and contestants are eligible to play in the bonus round.

== Bonus round ==
- Contestant winners will receive prize winnings 1,000,000, 00.
- In the bonus round, contestants will play against the winner.
- There are 9 categories of questions, play time is 5 minutes.
- Time will start playing after randomization calculated value of the gift is complete.
- The prizes are available:
1. Rp500,000
2. Rp1,000,000
3. Rp1,500,000
4. Rp2,000,000
5. Rp3,000,000
6. Rp5,000,000
7. Rp7,000,000
8. Rp10,000,000
9. Rp20,000,000

Answer	Result
Right	Contestants earn additional bonus prizes.
Wrong	Question has failed, can not be re-elected, in which prizes can not be obtained.
Pass	The question will be suspended, can be re-elected if there is still time.

- If a category is answered pass 3 times, then that category is considered wrong.
- If the 9 questions answered correctly, the contestant winners will receive prizes Rp50,000,000 00.
- The game will end 'if and only if' contestant winners do 3 times a wrong answer or running out of time, whichever occurs first.
- Contestants winner is entitled to whatever gains the title of rank 1 prize.
- Acquisition of the final prize for the winner is the contestant wins prizes plus a bonus round prizes (maximum Rp51,000,000).

== See also ==
- Trans TV
