= 21 Cineplex =

Indonesian movie theater chain

PT Nusantara Sejahtera Raya Tbk
- XXI logo since 2004, currently used as a corporate logo
- Trade name: Cinema 21/21 Cineplex
- Formerly: PT Subentra Nusantara (1987–1998)
- Company type: Public (Perseroan terbatas)
- Traded as: IDX: CNMA
- Industry: Film industry
- Founded: 21 August 1987; 38 years ago
- Founder: Sudwikatmono; Benny Suherman; Harris Lesmana
- Headquarters: Jakarta, Indonesia
- Number of locations: 257
- Area served: Nationwide
- Key people: Suryo Suherman (president commissioner); Hans Gunadi (president director)
- Brands: Cinema XXI; Cinema 21; The Premiere
- Services: Multiplex
- Website: 21cineplex.com cinema21.co.id

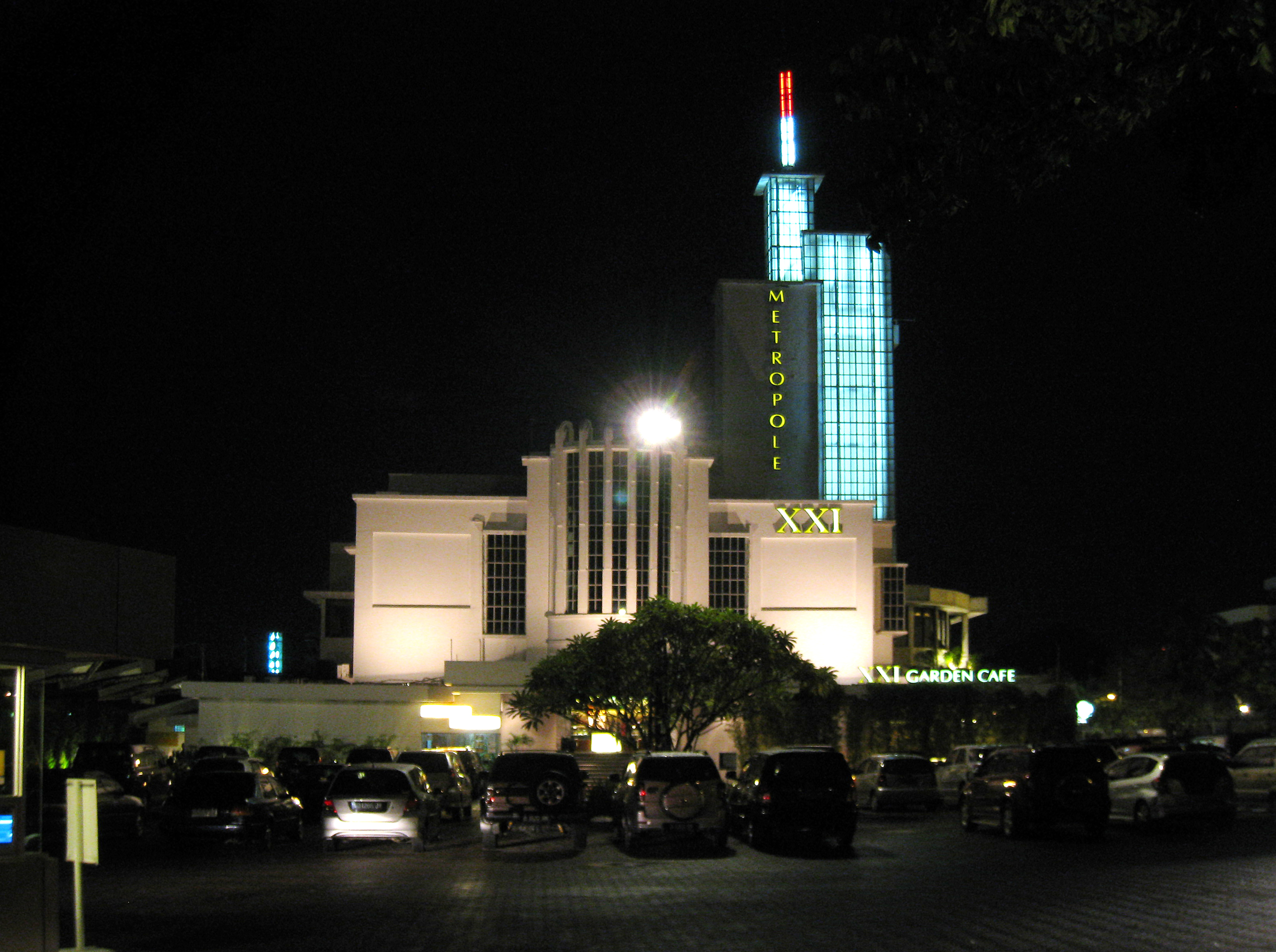
Metropole XXI in Menteng, Central Jakarta

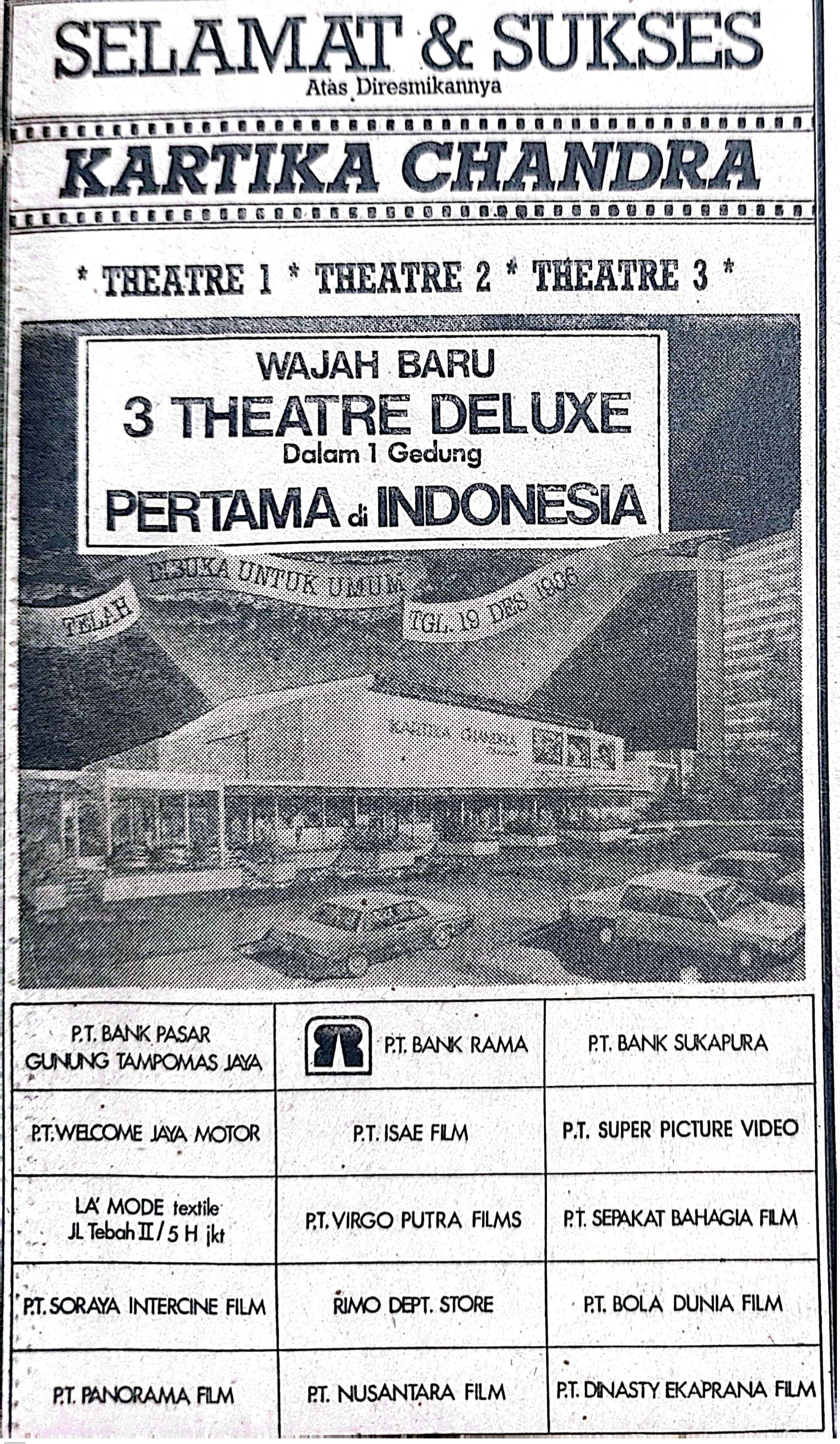
A newspaper advertisement that shows the relaunch of Kartika Chandra cinema, now Hollywood XXI in Jakarta

PT Nusantara Sejahtera Raya Tbk doing business as Cinema 21 or 21 Cineplex is the largest cinema chain in Indonesia, serving 65 cities in the country. It was founded on 21 August 1987 as Studio Twenty One.

Since its founding, 21 Cineplex has conducted some improvements and innovations, such as forming a cinema network with three separate brands to target different markets, namely Cinema 21, Cinema XXI and The Premiere. Some cinemas offer Dolby Atmos and IMAX. As of December 2024, it has 1,349 screens across 257 locations throughout Indonesia.

The company has been listed on the Indonesia Stock Exchange since 2 August 2023.

== The Premiere ==
The Premiere is targeted at audiences who wish for luxurious facilities in a cinema, but it is not available at every branch. It was first opened in 2002.
