= Feni Rose =

Indonesian TV presenter and businessperson (born 1973)

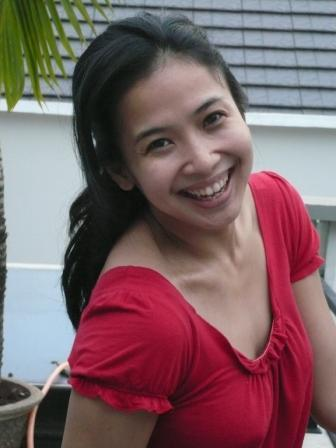
- Born: Feni Rosewidyadhari; November 1, 1973 (age 52); Malang, East Java, Indonesia
- Education: University of Indonesia
- Occupations: Presenter, Businessperson
- Years active: 1999 - present
- Spouse: Enkito Herman Nugroho (divorced)
- Children: 2
- Sports commentary career
- Genre: Sportscaster
- Sports: Aerobics, Formula One, Association football
- Employer: RCTI (1999 - 2001); TPI (2002 - 2004)

Feni Rosewidyadhari (born November 1, 1973) is an Indonesian presenter and businessperson. She is notable for her performance as Ibu Dewi in a Sabun Surf advertisement, and as a presenter in the Silet infotainment program on RCTI and Formula One in RCTI, TPI, and GlobalTV.

== Profile ==
Feni Rose is an alumnus of the University of Indonesia, majoring in Anthropology. She began her television career in 1999 when she became a quiz presenter in the Formula One live show on RCTI.

In 2002, she (with F1 live) moved to TPI. She became a Qualifying Session presenter of this show, and for the 2003 and 2004 seasons, she was hosting the Formula One show in TPI. She also presents the soccer program "Liga Italia Serie-A" on TPI.

== Hobby ==
She has a hobby of aerobics and she conducted Prima Raga in ANTV. In 2012, at the age of 38, she became a presenter of aerobic Fresh & Fun.

== Personal life ==
Feni Rose was previously married to a man named Enkito Herman Nugroho. Due to family communication issues, the couple divorced in 2019. Feni Rose herself only disclosed the reasons for their divorce in 2022.
