= List of Netflix original films (2020) =

Netflix is an American global on-demand Internet streaming media provider, that has distributed a number of original programs, including original series, specials, miniseries, documentaries and films. Netflix's original films also include content that was first screened on cinematic release in other countries or given exclusive broadcast in other territories, and is then described as Netflix original content.

== Feature films ==
Title	Release date	Genre	Runtime	Language
Ghost Stories	January 1, 2020	Horror anthology	2 h 24 min	Hindi
A Fall from Grace	January 17, 2020	Thriller	2 h	English
Airplane Mode	January 23, 2020	Comedy	1 h 36 min	Portuguese
Horse Girl	February 7, 2020	Psychological drama	1 h 44 min	English
To All the Boys: P.S. I Still Love You	February 12, 2020	Teen romantic comedy	1 h 42 min	English
Isi & Ossi	February 14, 2020	Romantic comedy	1 h 53 min	German
The Last Thing He Wanted	February 21, 2020	Political thriller	1 h 55 min	English
Yeh Ballet	February 21, 2020	Drama	1 h 57 min	Hindi
All the Bright Places	February 28, 2020	Teen romance	1 h 48 min	English
Guilty	March 6, 2020	Thriller drama	1 h 59 min	Hindi
Spenser Confidential	March 6, 2020	Action comedy	1 h 51 min	English
Lost Girls	March 13, 2020	Crime drama	1 h 35 min	English
Ultras	March 20, 2020	Sports	1 h 49 min	Italian
The Occupant	March 25, 2020	Thriller	1 h 43 min	Spanish
Maska	March 27, 2020	Romantic comedy	1 h 51 min	Hindi
The Decline	March 27, 2020	Action thriller	1 h 23 min	French
Uncorked	March 27, 2020	Drama	1 h 44 min	English
Coffee & Kareem	April 3, 2020	Action comedy	1 h 28 min	English
The Main Event	April 10, 2020	Sports comedy	1 h 43 min	English
Love Wedding Repeat	April 10, 2020	Romantic comedy	1 h 40 min	English
Tigertail	April 10, 2020	Drama	1 h 31 min	English
Earth and Blood	April 17, 2020	Action	1 h 20 min	French
Rising High	April 17, 2020	Satire drama	1 h 34 min	German
Sergio	April 17, 2020	Biopic	1 h 58 min	English
The Willoughbys	April 22, 2020	Animated comedy	1 h 32 min	English
Time to Hunt	April 23, 2020	Action thriller	2 h 15 min	Korean
Extraction	April 24, 2020	Action	1 h 57 min	English
Dangerous Lies	April 30, 2020	Thriller	1 h 37 min	English
Rich in Love	April 30, 2020	Romantic comedy	1 h 45 min	Portuguese
All Day and a Night	May 1, 2020	Drama	2 h 1 min	English
Mrs. Serial Killer	May 1, 2020	Crime	1 h 47 min	Hindi
The Half of It	May 1, 2020	Teen romance	1 h 45 min	English
The Wrong Missy	May 13, 2020	Black comedy	1 h 30 min	English
The Lovebirds	May 22, 2020	Romantic comedy	1 h 27 min	English
I'm No Longer Here	May 27, 2020	Drama	1 h 52 min	Spanish
Intuition	May 28, 2020	Crime thriller	1 h 56 min	Spanish
Choked: Paisa Bolta Hai	June 5, 2020	Drama	1 h 54 min	Hindi
The Last Days of American Crime	June 5, 2020	Heist thriller	2 h 29 min	English
Da 5 Bloods	June 12, 2020	War drama	2 h 35 min	English
A Whisker Away	June 18, 2020	Anime fantasy	1 h 45 min	Japanese
Feel the Beat	June 19, 2020	Family / Comedy drama	1 h 49 min	English
Lost Bullet	June 19, 2020	Action	1 h 33 min	French
One-Way to Tomorrow	June 19, 2020	Romantic drama	1 h 30 min	Turkish
Bulbbul	June 24, 2020	Horror	1 h 34 min	Hindi
Nobody Knows I'm Here	June 24, 2020	Drama	1 h 31 min	Spanish
Eurovision Song Contest: The Story of Fire Saga	June 26, 2020	Musical comedy	2 h 3 min	English
Under the Riccione Sun	July 1, 2020	Romantic teenage drama	1 h 42 min	Italian
Desperados	July 3, 2020	Romantic comedy	1 h 46 min	English
The Old Guard	July 10, 2020	Superhero	2 h 5 min	English
The Players	July 15, 2020	Comedy	1 h 28 min	Italian
Fatal Affair	July 16, 2020	Psychological thriller	1 h 29 min	English
Offering to the Storm	July 24, 2020	Crime thriller	2 h 19 min	Spanish
The Kissing Booth 2	July 24, 2020	Teen romantic comedy	2 h 12 min	English
Seriously Single	July 31, 2020	Comedy	1 h 47 min	English
Raat Akeli Hai	July 31, 2020	Thriller	2 h 29 min	Hindi
Work It	August 7, 2020	Dance comedy	1 h 33 min	English
Gunjan Saxena: The Kargil Girl	August 12, 2020	Biographical drama	1 h 52 min	Hindi
Project Power	August 14, 2020	Superhero	1 h 53 min	English
Fearless	August 14, 2020	Animation / Superhero	1 h 31 min	English
Crazy Awesome Teachers	August 17, 2020	Comedy drama	1 h 41 min	Indonesian
The Crimes That Bind	August 20, 2020	Crime drama	1 h 39 min	Spanish
The Sleepover	August 21, 2020	Action comedy	1 h 43 min	English
Class of '83	August 21, 2020	Crime / Drama	1 h 38 min	Hindi
Dark Forces	August 21, 2020	Thriller	1 h 21 min	Spanish
All Together Now	August 28, 2020	Drama	1 h 33 min	English
Unknown Origins	August 28, 2020	Thriller	1 h 36 min	Spanish
Freaks – You're One of Us	September 2, 2020	Supernatural drama	1 h 32 min	German
Love, Guaranteed	September 3, 2020	Romantic comedy	1 h 31 min	English
I'm Thinking of Ending Things	September 4, 2020	Psychological thriller	2 h 14 min	English
The Babysitter: Killer Queen	September 10, 2020	Comedy / Horror	1 h 42 min	English
Dad Wanted	September 11, 2020	Family	1 h 43 min	Spanish
The Devil All the Time	September 16, 2020	Psychological thriller	2 h 18 min	English
The Paramedic	September 16, 2020	Thriller	1 h 34 min	Spanish
Dolly Kitty Aur Woh Chamakte Sitare	September 18, 2020	Drama	2 h	Hindi
Whipped	September 18, 2020	Romantic comedy	1 h 37 min	Indonesian
The Boys in the Band	September 30, 2020	Drama	2 h 2 min	English
All Because of You	October 1, 2020	Action comedy	1 h 41 min	Malay
Òlòtūré	October 2, 2020	Crime drama	1 h 46 min	English
Serious Men	October 2, 2020	Comedy drama	1 h 54 min	Hindi
The Binding	October 2, 2020	Horror	1 h 33 min	Italian
Vampires vs. the Bronx	October 2, 2020	Horror comedy	1 h 25 min	English
You've Got This	October 2, 2020	Romantic comedy	1 h 51 min	Spanish
Hubie Halloween	October 7, 2020	Comedy	1 h 43 min	English
Ginny Weds Sunny	October 9, 2020	Romantic comedy	2 h 5 min	Hindi
The Forty-Year-Old Version	October 9, 2020	Comedy drama	2 h 4 min	English
A Babysitter's Guide to Monster Hunting	October 15, 2020	Comedy / Fantasy / Family	1 h 38 min	English
Love Like the Falling Rain	October 15, 2020	Teen romantic drama	1 h 26 min	Indonesian
The Trial of the Chicago 7	October 16, 2020	Historical legal drama	2 h 10 min	English
Rebecca	October 21, 2020	Romantic thriller	2 h 3 min	English
Cadaver	October 22, 2020	Horror	1 h 26 min	Norwegian
Over the Moon	October 23, 2020	CGI animation musical fantasy	1 h 40 min	English
Holidate	October 28, 2020	Christmas romantic comedy	1 h 44 min	English
Nobody Sleeps in the Woods Tonight	October 28, 2020	Horror	1 h 43 min	Polish
His House	October 30, 2020	Thriller	1 h 33 min	English
Kaali Khuhi	October 30, 2020	Horror	1 h 30 min	Hindi
Rogue City	October 30, 2020	Crime	1 h 56 min	French
The Day of the Lord	October 30, 2020	Horror	1 h 33 min	Spanish
Operation Christmas Drop	November 5, 2020	Christmas romantic comedy	1 h 36 min	English
Citation	November 6, 2020	Drama	2 h 31 min	English
What We Wanted	November 11, 2020	Drama	1 h 33 min	German
Ludo	November 12, 2020	Anthology / Dark comedy	2 h 30 min	Hindi
Jingle Jangle: A Christmas Journey	November 13, 2020	Family / Christmas musical	1 h 59 min	English
The Life Ahead	November 13, 2020	Drama	1 h 35 min	Italian
The Princess Switch: Switched Again	November 19, 2020	Christmas romantic comedy	1 h 37 min	English
Christmas on the Square	November 22, 2020	Christmas musical	1 h 38 min	English
Hillbilly Elegy	November 24, 2020	Drama	1 h 57 min	English
Notes for My Son	November 24, 2020	Drama	1 h 23 min	Spanish
The Christmas Chronicles: Part Two	November 25, 2020	Christmas comedy	1 h 55 min	English
The Beast	November 27, 2020	Action thriller	1 h 39 min	Italian
The Call	November 27, 2020	Psychological thriller	1 h 52 min	Korean
Finding Agnes	November 30, 2020	Drama	1 h 45 min	Filipino
Just Another Christmas	December 3, 2020	Christmas comedy	1 h 41 min	Portuguese
Christmas Crossfire	December 4, 2020	Christmas thriller	1 h 46 min	German
Leyla Everlasting	December 4, 2020	Comedy	1 h 52 min	Turkish
Mank	December 4, 2020	Biopic	2 h 12 min	English
The Claus Family	December 7, 2020	Christmas fantasy	1 h 37 min	Dutch
Rose Island	December 9, 2020	Comedy drama	1 h 58 min	Italian
The Prom	December 11, 2020	Musical	2 h 12 min	English
A California Christmas	December 14, 2020	Christmas romantic comedy	1 h 47 min	English
Ma Rainey's Black Bottom	December 18, 2020	Drama	1 h 34 min	English
The Midnight Sky	December 23, 2020	Science fiction	1 h 58 min	English
AK vs AK	December 24, 2020	Black comedy thriller	1 h 49 min	Hindi
We Can Be Heroes	December 25, 2020	Superhero	1 h 40 min	English

== Documentaries ==
Title	Release date	Runtime	Language
Miss Americana	January 31, 2020	1 h 25 min	English
A Life of Speed: The Juan Manuel Fangio Story	March 20, 2020	1 h 32 min	Spanish
Crip Camp: A Disability Revolution	March 25, 2020	1 h 48 min	English
LA Originals	April 10, 2020	1 h 32 min	English
Circus of Books	April 22, 2020	1 h 26 min	English
A Secret Love	April 29, 2020	1 h 22 min	English
Murder to Mercy: The Cyntoia Brown Story	April 29, 2020	1 h 37 min	English
Becoming	May 6, 2020	1 h 29 min	English
Have a Good Trip: Adventures in Psychedelics	May 11, 2020	1 h 25 min	English
Spelling the Dream	June 3, 2020	1 h 23 min	English
One Take	June 18, 2020	1 h 25 min	Thai
Disclosure: Trans Lives on Screen	June 19, 2020	1 h 47 min	English
Athlete A	June 24, 2020	1 h 44 min	English
Mucho Mucho Amor: The Legend of Walter Mercado	July 8, 2020	1 h 36 min	English
We Are One	July 14, 2020	1 h 26 min	French
Father Soldier Son	July 17, 2020	1 h 40 min	English
The Speed Cubers	July 29, 2020	40 min	English
Anelka: Misunderstood	August 5, 2020	1 h 34 min	French
Rising Phoenix	August 26, 2020	1 h 46 min	English
My Octopus Teacher	September 7, 2020	1 h 25 min	English
The Social Dilemma	September 9, 2020	1 h 34 min	English
Hope Frozen: A Quest to Live Twice	September 15, 2020	1 h 20 min	Thai
GIMS: On the Record	September 17, 2020	1 h 36 min	French
American Murder: The Family Next Door	September 30, 2020	1 h 22 min	English
Dick Johnson Is Dead	October 2, 2020	1 h 30 min	English
David Attenborough: A Life on Our Planet	October 4, 2020	1 h 23 min	English
Bigflo & Oli: Hip Hop Frenzy	October 8, 2020	1 h 40 min	French
Blackpink: Light Up the Sky	October 14, 2020	1 h 19 min	Korean
The Three Deaths of Marisela Escobedo	October 14, 2020	1 h 49 min	Spanish
Rooting for Roona	October 15, 2020	41 min	Bengali
Guillermo Vilas: Settling the Score	October 27, 2020	1 h 34 min	Spanish
Secrets of the Saqqara Tomb	October 28, 2020	1 h 54 min	English
Shawn Mendes: In Wonder	November 23, 2020	1 h 23 min	English
Dance Dreams: Hot Chocolate Nutcracker	November 27, 2020	1 h 20 min.	English
Emicida: AmarElo – It's All for Yesterday	December 8, 2020	1 h 29 min	Portuguese
Giving Voice	December 11, 2020	1 h 30 min	English

== Specials ==
These programs are one-time original events or supplementary content related to original films.

Title	Release date	Genre	Runtime	Language
Road to Roma	February 11, 2020	Making-of	1 h 12 min	Spanish
Ben Platt: Live from Radio City Music Hall	May 20, 2020	Concert film	1 h 25 min	English
The Boys in the Band: Something Personal	September 30, 2020	Aftershow / Interview	28 min	English
Sarah Cooper: Everything's Fine	October 27, 2020	Variety show	49 min	English
Alien Xmas	November 20, 2020	Stop motion	42 min	English
Shawn Mendes: Live in Concert	November 25, 2020	Concert film	1 h 27 min	English
Angela's Christmas Wish	December 1, 2020	Animation	47 min	English
Ma Rainey's Black Bottom: A Legacy Brought to Screen	December 18, 2020	Aftershow / Interview	31 min	English
Ariana Grande: Excuse Me, I Love You	December 21, 2020	Concert film	1 h 37 min	English
Death to 2020	December 27, 2020	Comedy	1 h 10 min	English

== Shorts ==
These are programs that have a runtime of less than 20 minutes.

Title	Release date	Genre	Runtime	Language
What Did Jack Do?	January 20, 2020	Drama	17 min	English
Sitara: Let Girls Dream	March 8, 2020	Animation	15 min	English
Sol Levante	April 2, 2020	Anime	4 min	English
The Claudia Kishi Club	July 10, 2020	Documentary	17 min	English
John Was Trying to Contact Aliens	August 20, 2020	Documentary	16 min	English
A Love Song for Latasha	September 21, 2020	Documentary	19 min	English
I'm No Longer Here: A Discussion with Guillermo del Toro and Alfonso Cuarón	November 3, 2020	Aftershow / Interview	14 min	English
If Anything Happens I Love You	November 20, 2020	Animation	12 min	English
Canvas	December 11, 2020	Animation	9 min	English
Cops and Robbers	December 28, 2020	Animation	7 min	English
