= Mister Cartoon =

Pseudonym of Mark Machado, American tattoo and graffiti artist

- Born: Mark Machado; May 19, 1969 (age 57); Los Angeles, California
- Education: LA Trade Tech (dropped out)
- Known for: Tattoo and graffiti art
- Notable work: That Cat Bronson
- Movement: Chicano art movement
- Website: mistercartoon.com

Mark Machado, better known as Mister Cartoon or more commonly just Cartoon or Toon, is an American tattoo artist and graffiti artist based in Los Angeles, California. He has been described by the New York Times as an "instrumental figure in the Los Angeles hip-hop scene" and by the BBC as "one of the greatest living tattoo artists in the US". Growing up in the Los Angeles Harbor Region, young Cartoon began doing illustrations and graffiti then going on to airbrushing clothing and lowrider custom cars. Machado then moved on to working in the music industry doing album covers, tour merchandise and later tattooing recording artists and other celebrities.

Machado's style of art is part of the Chicano art movement and cholo culture, which he became part of in the late 1980s, using various mediums. His other work includes hand painted signs, screen printing, wall murals, clothing, and toy sculptures of cartoon cats. He adopted the "Fine Line" prison tattooing art style, alongside Old English lettering, which historically was developed in the California prison system.

Cartoon has tattooed the bodies of Kobe Bryant, Beyoncé Knowles, Shaquille O'Neal, Lewis Hamilton, Dr. Dre, 50 Cent, Eminem, Christina Aguilera, Travis Barker, Pink, Justin Timberlake, Danny Trejo, Melanie Griffith, and Snoop Dogg. Machado designed logos for musicians and record labels including Cypress Hill, Eazy-E's Ruthless Records and Eminem's Shady Records. Machado's art has been employed by Nike, Toyota, T-Mobile, the Los Angeles Kings, the Los Angeles Clippers, Modelo and in Grand Theft Auto.

== Early life ==
Machado grew up in the Harbor Area of the San Pedro neighborhood of Los Angeles. His parents were of Mexican heritage, his father grew up in South Tucson, Arizona. Machado grew up alongside one sister in a Catholic household. The parents owned a print shop together, with his father being a lithographer, they used Heidelbergs for clients that included James Brown. Machado's parents encouraged the arts, taking him to art house films and introducing disco and psychedelic rock music at home. At age 10 while learning to draw Machado got in trouble at Catholic school for drawing Jesus naked on the cross. As a kid Machado would go into the streets with friends and write on the side of school walls and handball courts emulating the quality of art he saw at his parents' shop.

Machado's nickname 'Cartoon' came from drawing all the time, the 'Mister' was added later in late 1980s to give the appearance of being older than people would expect. His first paying job was at age 12 doing illustrations for a client of the print shop his parents owned, which lead to his father regularly giving having him work on logos and menu designs for local restaurants. During his youth at elementary school Machado was once featured in the Daily Breeze local newspaper for his illustrative talents.

Machado attended San Pedro High School, doing illustrations for the banners and newspaper of the school. An early inspiration were the graffiti artists LEE and Fab Five Freddy from New York City, after first seeing their work in the music video for Rapture by Blondie. Locally the Samoan-American artist named “Dream” from Carson was another inspiration. As a way to practice his craft Machado would offer to create murals on large walls that had lots of graffiti to residents in poor neighborhoods, the murals would have imagery like Egyptian hieroglyphs or people sporting a handlebar moustache.

Due to local gang activity Machado was losing friends at an early age to death or jail and was pushed to get into custom cars as a hobby, his father was also a big fan of cars which helped develop the interest as they would go on road trips and to car shows together spotting different details and designs in cars. Machado's father also enrolled him in Karate school where the family business had been printing the diplomas with hand-stippled pen and ink illustrations of tigers and dragons as well as making the gym's obi belts. Despite his reluctancy, after joining Machado saw how the school's walls were airbrushed with dragons fighting samurais and waterfalls with rocks that had faces on them. The master of the dojo, Ron Tess, painted the facility himself and then taught Machado how to airbrush as well.

After attending car shows with his father, seeing older men do airbrushing, and learning from master Tess, for his 16th birthday Machado was gifted an airbrush. He would take it to the Gardena swap meets and the Roadium in Torrance. In his first day of business he made one thousand dollars, the initial business was sign painting and airbrushing logos or murals on clothing and cars for auto shops, car shows, and swap meets. Machado would design for boxing gyms or car audio shops and barter his services or use the money earned from airbrushing to trade for car parts so he could build his own lowriders. While hanging out at the auto body shops Machado learned about pinstriping and how to paint custom cars. With the busy workload, Machado found his first business partner Abel “OG Abel” Izaguirre, whom he had met at the Hawthorne Plaza and also who he taught airbrushing to in ten minutes.

One of his first breakthroughs came as a fluke when a photojournalist from Car and Driver came to his high school asking if anyone could do a graffiti set for the backdrop of their magazine cover to which he took the offer. At the age of 17 Machado was charged with an act of vandalism for $30,000 but was prosecuted as a minor and not sent to juvenile hall as he pleaded guilty, instead going on probation for $3,000. In one of his earliest commissions, to cover the expense, he did a mural for a boxing gym.

== Career ==
Machado attended LA Trade Tech becoming one of the first in his family to attend post secondary education, it was during this period at trade school he learned to use a lettering quill alongside gold leaf and enamel sign graphics. He lasted only one year at the school and was removed due to not following the school's rules or the academic deadlines given. Growing up in the 1980s and 1990s Machado saw the worlds of hip hop, tattoo culture, and street art in Los Angeles all fuse together. Machado initially started as a graffiti artist under the name “FLAME” or “FLAME ONE” in the WCA crew in 1987. In 1988 his sister gave him work making graffiti for movie sets and his mother would type up the invoices on a typewriter to help him get paid. At age 20 in 1989 Cartoon got a job as an illustrator for Hustler Magazine, while doing cartoon drawings for Southland hip hop artists album covers on the side.

Machado first big break into the music industry came after approaching Eazy-E at a car wash. Eazy-E then requested Machado to do some work for artists on his label Ruthless Records which included tour merchandise and three album covers; Paid the Cost, Kizz My Black Azz, and Black Mafia Life. The two would go on to travel together for work. In 1992 as Machado got further into the world of hip hop, at an album release party for Eazy-E's group Penthouse Players Clique at the Hollywood Athletic Club, through a friend Donnie Charles he met Estevan Oriol who was managing the rap group Cypress Hill. Oriol invited Machado to go on tour with him and Cypress Hill, and design an album cover for them. As Oriol was also their tour manager at the time, Oriol would document their travels and work through photography he would capture.

By the age of 22 Machado was in Tokyo, experiencing Japanese car culture, experimenting with drugs, and getting recognized for his clothing designs as the awareness for streetwear overseas was quite high due to the demand and Japanese street fashion culture. During his time in Tokyo, Machado became familiar with the local tattoo scene getting tattoos, going to local tattoo conventions, and also worked at a shop called Scratch Addiction in Harajuku on Takeshita-dori. Cartoon was doing murals on lowriders in Japan and Oriol would take the pictures for a local magazine called Fine, which would pay them $400–800 every month for shots of the cars.

After seeing friend and fellow graffiti artist RISK create graffiti influenced clothing designs, together Oriol and Machado went on to co-found Joker Brand Clothing in 1995, the brand was the second iteration after the first one failed due to a store owner stealing their original business ideas. The two also co-founded Soul Assassin studios in the early 1990s at a warehouse complex along the border of Skid Row and Little Tokyo which was the creative hub for where they worked with major brands. The studio reached revenues of $1.5 million with 13 employees in 2003 but eventually closed down during the Great Recession.

Machado started getting more tattoos during this period and Oriol encouraged Machado to transition to doing tattoo work as well. Machado would practice sketch ideas on Oriol, other friends, and himself with a homemade tattoo gun. Working alongside Cypress Hill brought Cartoon further attention eventually Oriol suggested to the Cypress Hill members and other co-headlining tour acts like Goodie Mob and Outkast to get tatted by Mister Cartoon. By the mid-1990s Machado was working as a tattoo artist, he would do clients designs in garages and nightclubs and eventually got a gig working at Spotlight Tattoo on Melrose Avenue in Hollywood alongside tattoo artists Baby Ray and Charlie Roberts. In 1997 Machado was promised to be mentored by Baby Ray only if he quit drinking and smoking.

In 1999 after working in the field for less than five years of tattooing, with his same homemade tattoo machine, Machado cemented his reputation as a tattoo artist doing Eminem's famous tattoo of the portrait of his daughter Hailie titled Bonnie and Clyde on his upper right arm and the R.I.P. for his uncle on his left shoulder. He eventually opened his own tattoo shop in Santa Monica in the early 2000s. By 2003 Machado charged $100–150 minimum per session but would go on to charge minimum $1000 for a tattoo and prices in the tens of thousands upward to $20,000-$50,000 for stars like 50 Cent and Eminem.

Machado appeared in the 2003 Def Jam documentary Scarface: Origins of a Hip Hop Classic. He rendered the graffiti used in throughout the 2004 video game Grand Theft Auto: San Andreas. In 2005 Cartoon was brought on to create custom Nike Cortez and Air Force 1 shoes, it took over a year for the company to be convinced to work with Cartoon. Machado was a contributor to Mass Appeal Magazine during the mid-2000s. Machado designed posters for the 2008 film Righteous Kill and in 2009 he was commissioned by Universal Studios to do billboards for the Fast & Furious movie. In August 2009, Cartoon designed a customized watch for Casio's G-Shock line.

In 2011 Mister Cartoon was featured in the Museum of Contemporary Art, Los Angeles exhibition Art in the Streets which was the first major U.S. museum survey on street art and graffiti. In 2012 Mister Cartoon partnered with Snoop Dogg to start an automotive car care product line called Sanctiond. In 2013 Cartoon designed custom hockey jerseys for the Los Angeles Kings NHL team. Machado was an executive producer for the 2016 film Lowriders, which was created over a 10-year process with 8 years of script revisions. The film started over meeting Brian Grazer by chance at a Nike event. In November 2019 Cartoon designed special edition basketball jerseys for the Los Angeles Clippers NBA team in Old English font, the process took over a year, in September 2022 custom jerseys by Cartoon were used by the team again.

In March 2020 Mister Cartoon created a mural for the Casa Vega restaurant. In June 2020, Cartoon collaborated with Vans to release two pairs of custom designed shoes. In 2020, Cartoon starred in and was the focus of the Netflix documentary LA Originals, chronicling his and Oriol's lives, the film was developed over a ten-year process the original film idea was titled Ink and produced by Brian Grazer's Imagine Entertainment but was scrapped. Mister Cartoon worked on a trading card project for the Topps company which was released in December 2020, depicting past and present players such as Mike Trout. In 2021, Constellation Brands featured him in one of their Fighting Spirit Modelo Beer Super Bowl television commercials. In April 2021 B-Real and Cartoon created a NFT collection of 3D animations.

In March 2023 Cartoon designed special edition jerseys for the Los Angeles Dodgers. In May 2023 Mister Cartoon collaborated on a clothing line with October's Very Own and Major League Soccer for three of the league's teams. In June 2023 Machado had his first solo exhibition titled Just My Imagination in Hollywood. Machado also collaborated with Turtle Wax in June 2023 and April 2024 doing a custom logo and line of car cleaning products. In July 2023 Cartoon released a book of past sketches and drawings. Machado opened a barbershop called Master Deluxe with longtime friend Arturo Arce in 2023. In 2024 Cartoon worked with the city of Los Angeles tourism department as part of their largest ever global advertising campaign, as well as designing a collection for Supreme in August 2024. In October 2025 Cartoon designed and released a clothing line with the Los Angeles Rams.

== Artistry ==
The style of which Machado's work is based on originated in the prison culture of West Los Angeles, the streets of East Los Angeles during the 1970s, emerging scenes of graffiti in New York City, and chicano culture. He was also inspired by the 1940s, an era his father grew up with aspirations of the American Dream from a Mexican perspective. After having visited and lived in Japan, Machado found inspiration from Japanimation, Sorayama, and Irezumi.

Machado uses typography like Old English text for tattoos most notably Southside 50 on the backside of rapper 50 Cent's body. His imagery notably contains clowns, angels, and fantasy settings with themes surrounding poverty, violence, addiction, and the energy of Los Angeles.

While painting, Machado often listens to soul music of the Philadelphia and Motown sound's from the 1960s and 1970s playing groups like the Temptations, the Stylistics, and Marvin Gaye, as well as Funk music from artists like Parliament Funkadelic and Rick James. He is also inspired by classic rock bands Led Zeppelin, Pink Floyd, and The Doors.

== Personal life ==
Machado is married and has a home studio in the San Fernando Valley, which two of his four children work out of with him. A collector of classic cars, he owns 11 cars including a 1964 Chevrolet Impala, a 1967 Chevrolet Impala a 1988 Nissan truck, and a 1939 Chevrolet Master Deluxe in his collection. He was a member of the Lifestyle Car Club in Los Angeles from 1993 to 2012, and moved to Pegasus Car Club in 2013.
