= Deddy Corbuzier =

Indonesian TV presenter, actor, YouTuber and mentalist (born 1976)

Lieutenant Colonel (Tit.) Deddy Corbuzier
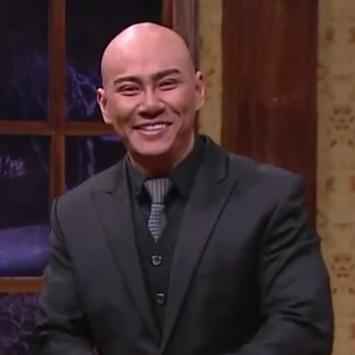
- Deddy as a co-host in Ini Talkshow at NET.
- Born: Deodatus Andreas Deddy Cahyadi Sunjoyo; 28 December 1976 (age 49); Jakarta, Indonesia
- Education: Atma Jaya University (S.Psi. M.Psi.); University of London (PhD)
- Occupations: Magician; presenter; mentalist; YouTuber
- Years active: 1998–2015 (as magician); 2000–present (as presenter)
- Spouse: Kalina Oktarani (m. 2005; div. 2013) Sabrina Chairunnisa (m. 2022; div. 2025)
- Honours: Brevet Lieutenant Colonel of the Indonesian Army Reserve Components

YouTube information
- Channel: Deddy Corbuzier
- Years active: 2011–present
- Genre: Podcast
- Subscribers: 25.4 million
- Views: 8.1 billion
- Last updated: 7 august 2026

Deodatus Andreas Deddy Cahyadi Sunjoyo (born 28 December 1976), commonly known as Deddy Corbuzier, is an Indonesian television presenter, actor, YouTuber, and former mentalist. He is a recipient of the Merlin Award for "World's Best Mentalist" twice in a row. Deddy made his debut on television in 1998 with Impresario 008 on RCTI. He did many publicity stunts with many famous magicians. As an actor, Deddy starred in The Mentalist (2011). Deddy also wrote, directed, and starred in the action film Triangle The Dark Side (2016)

Deddy is also known as a YouTuber. Since resigning from the magician world, Deddy now publishes videos of his podcast titled Close the Door on his YouTube channel. As of November 2021, his YouTube channel has over 16 million subscribers and his videos have over 2.31 billion views.

== Early life ==
Deodatus Andreas Deddy Cahyadi Sunjoyo was born on 28 December 1976 in Jakarta, Indonesia, to Oemar Sundjojo (1934 – 1 January 2007) and Heniwaty (28 July 1935 – 26 August 2026).

His father Sundjojo was born in 1934 in Banyuwangi, East Java, and worked as a microbus driver. Sundjojo died at Rumah Sakit Husada in Sawah Besar, Central Jakarta, on 1 January 2007 due to complications at the age of 73. His funeral was held at Tanah Kusir Cemetery on 4 January 2007. His mother Heniwaty was born on 28 July 1935 in Batavia, Dutch East Indies, and worked as a seamstress.

When Deddy Corbuzier was 8 years old, he saw a magician turning a handkerchief into a bouquet and was amazed. He then studied with several senior magicians to learn some simple magic tricks. However, he was not satisfied with this. At the age of 12, Deddy was determined to learn more difficult types of magic. He began his career by demonstrating several types of magic in Ancol Fantasy World, Jakarta.

Deddy has dyslexia. His dyslexia condition sparked his interest in psychology. He claimed by studying psychology, he will get better understanding about himself and his condition. He had a bachelor's degree of psychology from the Atma Jaya Catholic University of Indonesia obtained in 1998 and a master's degree of psychology from the University of London obtained in 1999.

== Career ==
In addition to performing in magic shows and hosting magic-related talk shows on television, Deddy has appeared in several TV and print advertisements. He has also made guest appearances in several soap operas. Although he is known as a magician, he prefers to be called a mentalist.

In mid-2013, Deddy "invented" his diet technique which he named "OCD" or "Obsessive Corbuzier Diet". This technique is based on Intermittent Fasting combined with HIIT (High Intensity Interval Training). Deddy set up a website and published an electronic book talking about his own body changes.

Deddy has a YouTube Channel. He posts videos from his podcast Close the Door which contains conversations about news in Indonesia. He invites guest stars such as Novel Baswedan, Taufik Hidayat, and Syeikh Ali Jaber.

He was appointed as the ambassador for the Ministry of Defense's Reserve Component Program on 13 October 2021. For his work with the Ministry in promoting the program, Minister of Defense Prabowo Subianto, appointed him as Brevet Lieutenant Colonel on 9 December 2022. His appointment was approved by Commander of the Indonesian Armed Forces General Andika Perkasa and Commander of the Indonesian Army General Dudung Abdurrachman.

As ambassador of the Reserve Component, he was subordinate to Directorate General III (Defense Potentials) of the Ministry of Defense. In Prabowo administration's Ministry of Defense, he is appointed as Special Staff to the Minister on Social Communication and Public Affairs, reporting directly to the defense minister Sjafrie Sjamsoeddin. Despite the appointment, his brevet rank still retained.

== Personal life ==
Corbuzier was married to Kalina Ocktaranny from 2005 to 2013. They had a son. In 2013, their divorce was finalized.

Corbuzier has an adopted daughter.

In 2022, Deddy Corbuzier married Sabrina Chairunnisa.

== Controversy ==
=== Massive homophobic attacks ===
In May 2022, Deddy Corbuzier received significant homophobic feedback on social media after having invited a famous gay couple in Indonesia to do a podcast. A few hours after Deddy Corbuzier uploaded the video, the topic of LGBT and the hashtag #UnsubscribeDeddyCorbuzier was trending on Indonesian Twitter. Deddy Corbuzier also received criticism from religious leaders in Indonesia. Even so, the video got more than 4.7 million views in just a day.

== Filmography ==
=== Film ===
Year	Title	Role	Notes
2011	The Mentalist	Deddy Corbuzier	Main role
2012	Sanubari Jakarta	Srikandi's Superior	Episode: "Topeng Srikandi"
2016	Triangle the Dark Side	Deddy	Also screenwriter, producer, executive producer, and directors
2017	Knight Kris	Bayukris	Voice role Also executive producer
2020	Bucin	Gym Instructor	Actor (cameo)

=== Soap operas ===
- Raja Sulap
- Tawa Sutra Coooyyy

== Television ==
- Impresario 008 (RCTI)
- Deddy Corbuzier Show (RCTI)
- After School (RCTI)
- Hitam Putih (Trans 7)
- World Record (Trans 7)
- Indonesia Mencari Bakat (Trans TV)
- The Master season 1–5 (RCTI)
- Deal Or No Deal Indonesia (ANTV)
- The Next Mentalist (Trans 7)
- Big Deddy (Global TV)
- My Games (Trans 7)
- The Magic Show (Trans TV)
- Sexy Magic (Trans TV)
- Magicomic Show (Indosiar)
- Jendela Ramadan Indonesia (NET.)
- Deddy's Corner (Trans TV)
- OOTD (Obrolan of the Day) (Trans 7)
- Indonesia's Next Top Model (NET.)

== Books ==
- Mantra (2005)
- Book of Magic (2007)
- Seven Dark Secrets of Rubik's Cube (2008)
- OCD: Obsessive Corbuzier's Diet (2013)
- Youtuber for Dummies (2018)
- Millennial Power (2019)

== Awards and nominations ==
Year	Award	Category	Hasil
2011	Panasonic Gobel Awards 2011	Talk-show Host	Nominated
2012	Panasonic Gobel Awards 2012	Quiz/Game-show Host	Nominated
2012	Panasonic Gobel Awards 2012	Entertainment Talk-show Host	Nominated
2013	Panasonic Gobel Awards 2013	Entertainment Talk-show Host	Nominated
2014	Panasonic Gobel Awards 2014	Entertainment Program Host	Nominated
2015	Panasonic Gobel Awards 2015	Music/Variety Show & Entertainment Host	Nominated
2015	Anugerah Komisi Penyiaran Indonesia 2015	Favorite Host	Nominated
2017	Panasonic Gobel Awards 2017	Talk-show Variety & Entertainment	Won
2017	Anugerah Komisi Penyiaran Indonesia 2017	Talk-show host	Nominated
2018	Indonesian Choice Awards 2018	Digital Persona of the Year	Nominated
2018	Panasonic Gobel Awards 2018	Variety & Entertainment Talk-show Host	Nominated
2018	Panasonic Gobel Awards 2018	Variety & Entertainment Talk-show Host	Nominated
2020	The Diamond Creator Award 2020	YouTuber Gaining 10 Million Subscribers	Won
