= Medy Renaldy =

Indonesian content creator (born 1996)

- Born: Medy Renaldy; December 31, 1996 (age 29); Jakarta, Indonesia
- Other name: Medy
- Education: Trisakti University
- Occupations: Content creator; Entrepreneur
- Years active: 2018–present
- Spouse: Charera Prilly (m. 2025)

YouTube information
- Channel: MedyRenaldy
- Years active: 2011–present
- Subscribers: 5 million
- Views: 1.19 billion
- Last updated: 2 October 2026

Medy Renaldy (born 31 december 1996) is an Indonesian content creator, illustrator, and entrepreneur. He is widely known for his review content on toys, particularly action figures and rare collectible items on the YouTube and TikTok platforms. In addition to his digital career, Medy is also known as the 2nd Runner-up for Abang Jakarta Timur (East Jakarta Young Ambassador) in the 2018 Abang None Jakarta competition. Medy is also on the 2026 Forbes 30 under 30 Asia list for social media.

== Early life and education ==
Medy Renaldy was born in Jakarta on December 31, 1996. He is an alumnus of Trisakti University, Faculty of Industrial Technology, majoring in Industrial Engineering at the class of 2014.

He has been pursuing his hobby of collecting action figures since he was in junior high school. His first collection was an action figure of Sheriff Woody from the Toy Story film, which was a gift from his parents. His current collection includes various characters, ranging from Iron Man, Captain America, to the Annabelle Doll.

During college, Medy did not only focus on academics but was also active outside of campus. In 2018, he represented East Jakarta in the Abang None Jakarta competition and successfully achieved the 3rd Place position as well as earning the Favorite Winner title.

== Career and business ==
=== Illustrator and Entrepreneur ===
Before becoming a full-time content creator, Medy worked as an illustrator. He has enjoyed drawing since 2014 and often painted portraits of important figures and celebrities, such as Jokowi, Will Smith, Najwa Shihab, and Benyamin.

In 2017, he founded MR Creative Lab, a service for creating realistic face illustrations and for a gallery of his artworks. Due to his talent in drawing, he was invited to appear on the talk show Hitam Putih on Trans7 hosted by Deddy Corbuzier in 2018.

In addition to digital content, Medy also founded a business into the culinary field by founding Soto Susu Bu Tin restaurant in January 2020, which serves Soto Betawi with a special recipe from his mother.

=== Content Creator ===
Medy has had a YouTube channel since October 2, 2011, but he became consistent in uploading content since 2020. He focuses his content on reviews, unboxing, and stories about expensive, rare, and high-quality toy collections from various franchises such as Marvel, Harry Potter, and Toy Story.

In September 2024, Medy had the opportunity to meet American YouTuber, IShowSpeed, during his visit to Jakarta, and Medy gave him a Cristiano Ronaldo action figure as a gift.

He is included in the Forbes 30 under 30 2026 list for social media.

As of 2 October 2026, Medy Renaldy's YouTube channel has over 5 million subscribers and 774 videos that have reached a billion views total. His TikTok account also has over 11 million followers.

== Public attention and controversy ==
=== Customs Incident ===
Medy once became the focus of media and collector communities after he expressed his disappointment with the Customs and Excise authorities. The incident occurred in April 2024 when a Megatron toy package, which was a gift shipment from the producer, was detained by the authorities and the toy box was reportedly damaged. Medy claimed he was asked to send an invoice for an item that was actually a gift.

=== Appeal to Stop Playing Roblox ===
In October 2025, Medy once again sparked public debate after uploading a video on TikTok containing a serious appeal to the public, especially adults, to stop playing the online game Roblox. Medy expressed concerns about the psychological and social impact of the game. He presented three main reasons:

- Potential indicator of a lack of social interaction, referring to study results linking internet gaming disorder to loneliness.
- The trend of mountain climbing simulations in Roblox was considered insulting to the nature-loving community.
- Potential for gaming disorder characterized by a chaotic lifestyle.

Medy's statement sparked pros and cons, and it emerged around the same time as a ban from the minister of primary and secondary education (Mendikdasmen) regarding the game Roblox for children, which also became a concern for the Deputy Minister of Communication and Digital Affairs.

== Personal life ==
Medy Renaldy officially married Charera Prilly, a TikToker and influencer, on Tuesday, February 25, 2025. Their marriage ceremony (akad nikah) was held intimately in Bali, with the backdrop of Uluwatu Beach.

The wedding attracted attention because Medy incorporated elements of his hobby. Their wedding rings were delivered by his favorite Transformer toy. In the reception held that evening, Medy also used Marvel characters (Thor, Deadpool, Doctor Strange, and Iron Man) as an analogy to express his feelings to Charera, further reinforcing his personal branding as a toy collector.

== Filmography and awards ==
=== Awards ===
Year	Event	Category	Result	Notes
2018	Abang None Jakarta	Abang East Jakarta	2nd Runner-up (3rd Place)	Also won Favorite Winner title

=== TV Shows ===
- Hitam Putih (2018), as guest star

== See also ==
- Deddy Corbuzier
