= Estevan Oriol =

Mexican-Italian photographer

- Born: August 2, 1966 (age 59); Santa Monica, California, U.S.
- Other name: Scandalous
- Occupations: Photographer; music video director
- Years active: 1991–present
- Website: estevanoriol.com

Estevan Oriol (born August 2, 1966) is an American photographer and director from Los Angeles, California. He has photographed chicano, cholo culture, and Los Angeles gang culture at large, as well as film and hip-hop celebrities. Oriol directed the documentary film LA Originals (2020).

== Early life ==
Oriol was born in Santa Monica to a father (Eriberto Oriol) who was a photographer. Oriol moved to Hollywood at the age of 19 and was inspired by his father. He worked as a bouncer at hip-hop clubs before moving on to tour manage Cypress Hill and House of Pain. During that time he began documenting his life on the road.

== Career ==
Oriol has made gritty 35mm black and white work, documenting chicano, cholo culture (and Los Angeles gang culture at large). He has photographed film and hip-hop celebrities. He has photographed both gang members and celebrities alike, capturing photos of "LA Fingers". His LA Fingers photo in 1995 was featured in several magazines and copied or bootlegged for tattoos and t-shirts.

In 2004, he participated in the elaboration of the videogame GTA San Andreas. In 2008 he photographed Snoop Dogg's Ego Trippin' album cover. Oriol has gone on to direct music videos for rock and hip-hop artists including Blink 182, D12, and Cypress Hill. He has also released books and calendars, including LA Woman, published in 2009 by Drago.

In March 2018, Oriol became creative director for media company BallerStatus.com. He has also become a partner. He has partnerships with life-long friend and collaborator, Mister Cartoon for Joker Brand Clothing and Soul Assassins Studios, the latter of which the two opened together by way of Cypress Hill's producer, DJ Muggs. Oriol directed and was the focus of the 2020 Netflix documentary LA Originals, chronicling his and Mister Cartoon's lives as chicano creatives and ambassadors in art, hip-hop and counterculture.

== Publications ==
- L.A. Woman (Drago, 2009)
- L.A. Portraits (Drago, 2013)
- This is Los Angeles (Drago, 2018)
- Bosozoku (Kill Your Idols, 2021)

== Filmography ==
- "Psycho City Blocks" by Psycho Realm
- "Stone Garden" by Psycho Realm
- "No Entiendes La Onda" (How I Could Just Kill A Man)" by Cypress Hill
- "Red-Emption" by Big Red
- "Dr. Greenthumb" by Cypress Hill
- "Shit On You" by D12
- "Heart of a Rebel" by SX10
- "High Voltage" by Linkin Park
- "Real Life" by DJ Muggs feat Kool G Rap
- "When the Fat Lady Sings" by DJ Muggs feat GZA
- "Like It" by Screaming Soul Hill
- "Kemuri" by Screaming Soul Hill
- "Funky Beat" by Big Red
- "Ni De Aqui Ni De Alla" by Jae-P
- "Down" by Blink-182
- "Hold You Down" by The Alchemist
- "What I Can't Describe" by The Transplants
- "Gangsters & Thugs" by The Transplants
- "Swing Life Away" by Rise Against
- "Criminal Set" by Xzibit
- "Stronger" by TRUSTcompany
- "16 16 Six" by The Drips
- "Lights Out" by P.O.D.
- "Traffic" by the Reyes Bros
- "Break Em Off" by Paul Wall
- "La Manera" by Adassa
- "El Barrio" by DJ Muggs feat Sick Jacken
- "Hang With My Dogs" by Omar Cruz
- "Posted On The Block" by C-Murder
- "Like Yeah" by Tech N9ne
- "Do Something" by Dyme Def
- "The Problem Is" by Murs feat Sick Jacken & Uncle Chucc
- "Saturday Night" by Travis Barker
- "Fish" by Bambu
- "Snap Ya Neck Back" by DJ Muggs feat Dizzee Rascal & Bambu
- "Ikarus" by Kontra K
