= Sarah Kuhn =

American comics writer and novelist

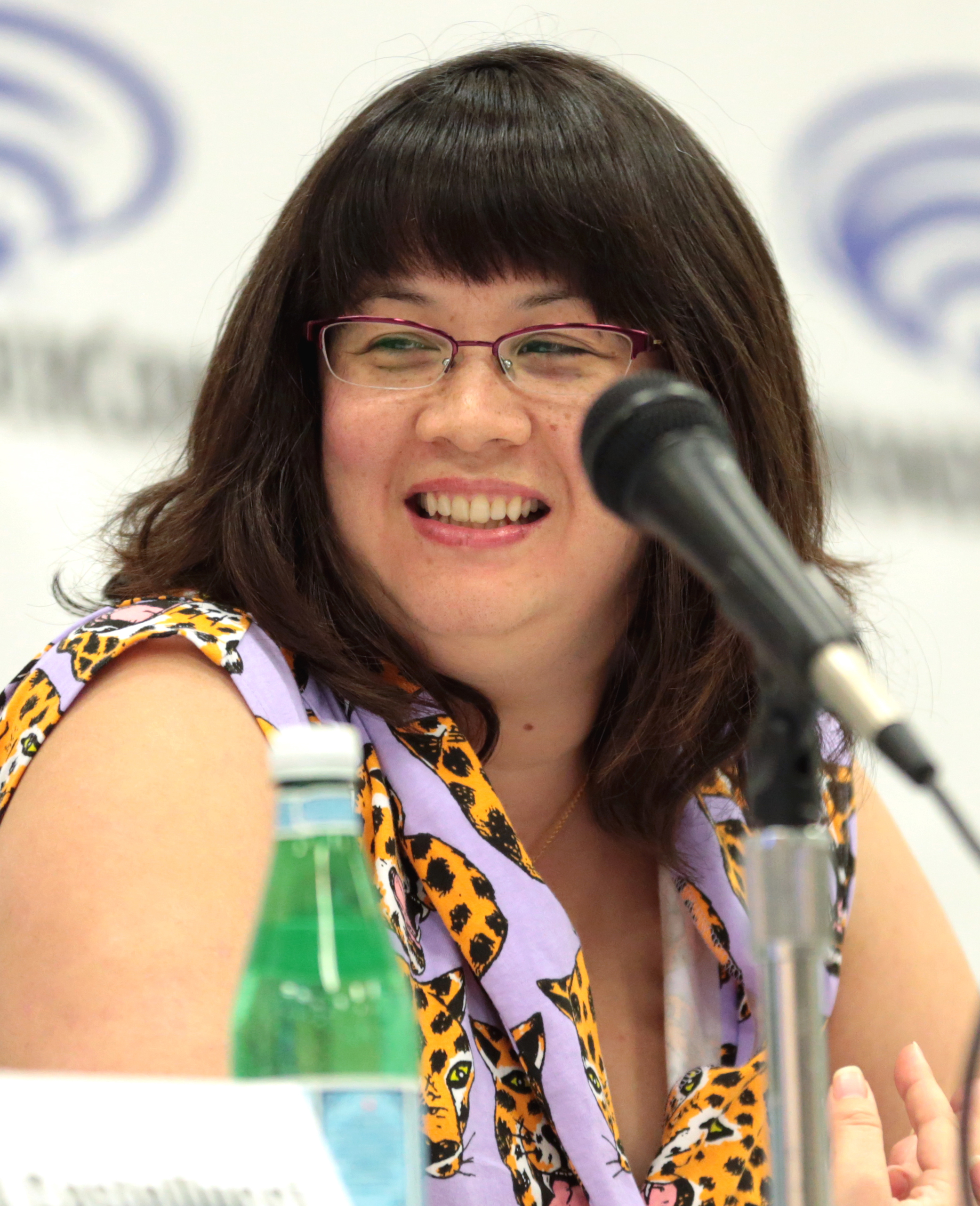
- Kuhn at the 2017 WonderCon
- Occupation: Author
- Website: heroinecomplex.com

Sarah Kuhn is an American author of fantasy literature best known for her Heroine Complex series featuring Asian American superheroines.

== Career ==
Early in her career, in 2010, Kuhn wrote a rom-com novella, "One Con Glory", which garnered positive reviews from io9 and USA Today and went into development as a feature film. Kuhn has written articles and essays for various genre-specific publications such as Apex Magazine, IGN, Backstage, Creative Screenwriting Magazine, and the Hugo-nominated essay collection Chicks Dig Comics.

Kuhn has also worked on Barbie comics and on a comic book continuation of the movie Clueless, which she worked on with Amber Benson and Siobhan Keenan. With artist Nicole Goux, Kuhn has worked on a Batgirl/Cassandra Cain graphic novel for DC Comics. Kuhn also wrote a Doctor Aphra audio drama with a full cast in 2020.

== Personal life ==
In 2011, she was selected as a finalist for the Coalition of Asian Pacifics in Entertainment New Writers Award and in 2018 she was one of the finalists for the Astounding Award for Best New Writer. Kuhn is married and lives in Los Angeles.

Kuhn is of half-Japanese, quarter-German and quarter-English descent and is featured in the 2020 Netflix documentary The Claudia Kishi Club.

== Bibliography ==
Heroine Complex

- Heroine Complex (2016)
- Heroine Worship (2017)
- Heroine's Journey (2018)
- Unsung Heroine (2019)
- Haunted Heroine (2020)
- Hollywood Heroine (2021)

YA novels

- I Love You So Mochi (2019)
- From Little Tokyo, With Love (2021)

Graphic novels

- Shadow of the Batgirl (2020)
- Riverdale Diaries, Vol. 1: Hello, Betty! (2020)
- Girl Taking Over: A Lois Lane Story (2023)
