= Wahtye =

Egyptian priest of the 25th century BC

Egyptian name
wA H t X3Wꜣḥ.tj
- Born: c. 2485 BC
- Died: c. 2450 BC (aged c. 35)
- Burial: Badrashin, Giza, Egypt
- Spouse: Weret Ptah
- Mother: Merit Meen
- Children: Seshemnefer, Kaiemakhnetjer, Sebaib, and Seket

Wahtye (c. 2485 BC - c. 2450 BC) was a high-ranking priest and official who served under King Neferirkare Kakai during the Fifth Dynasty of Egypt. Based on his skull, he was probably around 35 years old when he died.

== Tomb ==
In November 2018, it was announced that Wahtye's tomb had been found at the Saqqara necropolis. Inside the tomb were reliefs of Wahtye (he stole the tomb of his brother), his wife Weret Ptah, his 4 children and his mother Merit Meen. The tomb is 10 metres (33 ft) long from north to south and 3 metres (9.8 ft) wide from east to west and was built circa 2415–2405 BC. Wahtye and his family were buried there but not all of them were in wooden sarcophagi. The tomb has an inscription about Wahtye: "Wahtye, Purified priest to the King, Overseer of the Divine Estate, overseer of the Sacred Boat, Revered with the great God, Wahtye". When inspecting the structure of Wahtye's bones, the archeologists found that they were distended, indicating that Wahtye had a disease. One hypothesis by Amira Shahin, professor of rheumatology at Cairo University, is that he had malaria.

Wahtye's tomb contains 4 shafts. The first shaft was empty and incomplete. The second, third and fourth shafts were filled with the remains of Wahtye and his family. The tombs were separated by gender, the deepest one contained Wahtye's remains which were found in a wooden sarcophagus, another contained the remains of Wahtye's mother Merit Meen who was probably 55-years-old, his wife Weret Ptah who was most likely around her thirties and his young daughter who was probably 6-years-old when she died and the other one contained Wahtye's 3 sons with two of them most likely under 20 and 18.

== Life ==
The names of members of Wahtye's family inscribed in his tomb included those of his mother, Merit Meen, his wife Weretptah, his sons Seshemnefer, Kaiemakhnetjer, and Sebaib, and his daughter Seket.

== Documentary ==
On 28 October 2020, Netflix premiered a two-hour documentary about the discovery of Wahtye's tomb called Secrets of the Saqqara Tomb.
