= Road to Roma =

- Film poster
- Directed by: Andres Clariond; Gabriel Nuncio
- Written by: Pedro G. García
- Starring: Alfonso Cuarón
- Production company: Netflix Studios
- Distributed by: Netflix
- Release date: February 11, 2020
- Running time: 72 minutes
- Country: Mexico
- Languages: Spanish; Mixtec

Road to Roma is a 2020 Mexican making-of documentary film directed by Andres Clariond and Gabriel Nuncio, and starring Yalitza Aparicio, Odín Ayala and Eugenio Caballero. The premise revolves around the making of the film Roma (2018).

== Cast ==
- Yalitza Aparicio
- Odín Ayala
- Eugenio Caballero
- Zarela Lizbeth
- Diego Cortina Autrey
- Andy Cortés
- Alfonso Cuarón
- Marina de Tavira
- Daniela Demesa
- Nancy García García
- Verónica García
- Marco Graf
- José Luis López Gómez
- Carlos Peralta

== Release ==
Road to Roma was released on February 11, 2020.
