= Indonesia Mencari Bakat season 3 =

Indonesia Mencari Bakat
- Season 3
- Hosted by: Ananda Omesh
- Judges: Titi Sjuman; Addie MS; Syahrini; Deddy Corbuzier; Soimah

Release
- Original network: Trans TV
- Original release: September 2012

The third season of Indonesia Mencari Bakat, a reality television series, will premiered on September 14, 2012. This season is the first season without judge Sarah Sechan and Rianti Cartwright. They were replaced with pop singer Syahrini, as announced on June 20, 2012.

== Preliminary auditions ==
Producers' auditions were held in Yogyakarta, Makassar, Surabaya, Denpasar, Medan, Bandung, and Jakarta.

Live theater auditions took place in the Trans TV's studio :

Audition city	Audition Date	Air Date
Yogyakarta	June 23–24, 2012	TBA
Makassar	June 23–24, 2012	TBA
Surabaya	June 30-July 1, 2012	TBA
Denpasar	June 30-July 1, 2012	TBA
Medan	July 7–8, 2012	September 15, 2012
Bandung	July 7–8, 2012	September 14, 2012
Jakarta	July 14–15, 2012	TBA

== Production ==
The show's executive produce announced on the press conference in June 2012 that there will be new graphics, lighting, theme music, show intro and a larger live audience. Sarah Sechan, Titi Sjuman and Addie MS all expected to return as judges, in addition to Ananda Omesh who returned as host. Rianti Cartwright was replaced with pop singer, Syahrini. In the middle of production, Sarah Sechan resigned from this show, and will be replaced by a guest judge every week. Promotional videos began airing in June 2012.
