= Anelka: Misunderstood =

2020 documentary film

- Film poster
- French: Anelka : L'Incompris
- Directed by: Franck Nataf
- Starring: Nicolas Anelka; Franck Nataf; Omar Sy; Arsène Wenger; Thierry Henry; Didier Drogba; Emmanuel Petit
- Distributed by: Netflix
- Release date: 5 August 2020
- Running time: 94 minutes
- Languages: English; French

Anelka: Misunderstood (French: Anelka : L'Incompris) is a 2020 British-French documentary sports film directed by Éric Hannezo and features interviews with Nicolas Anelka, Franck Nataf, Omar Sy, Arsène Wenger, Thierry Henry, Didier Drogba, and Emmanuel Petit.

== Release ==
Anelka: Misunderstood was released on Netflix on 5 August 2020.
