= Secrets of the Saqqara Tomb =

2020 British film

- Film poster
- Directed by: James Tovell
- Produced by: Charlotte Chalker
- Cinematography: Ryan Earl Parker
- Edited by: Michael Rolt
- Music by: Jerry Lane
- Production companies: At Land Productions; Lion Television
- Distributed by: Netflix
- Release date: October 28, 2020
- Running time: 113 minutes
- Country: United Kingdom
- Language: English

Secrets of the Saqqara Tomb is a 2020 British documentary film directed by James Tovell. The film follows a team of Egyptian archeologists that discover a tomb from the 25th century BC in the Saqqara necropolis, just outside of Cairo that had been untouched for 4,400 years.

The film was produced by At Land Productions and Lion Television.

== Synopsis ==
A team of local archaeologists, led by Egyptologist Mohammad Mohammad Yousef, discover the never before explored passageways, shafts, and tombs, of one of the most paramount Ancient Egyptian discoveries ever found in the Saqqara necropolis. Regarded as one of the most significant finds in nearly fifty years, the perfectly preserved tomb is occupied by Wahtye, a high-ranking priest who lived during the Fifth Dynasty of Egypt, and his family. During the dig, the team finds several artifacts including personal possessions, statues, and mummy of the high-priest and his family as well as a mummified lion cub.

== Release ==
The film was released on Netflix on October 28, 2020.
