= John Was Trying to Contact Aliens =

2020 documentary film

- Film poster
- Directed by: Matthew Killip
- Starring: John Shepherd
- Production company: Netflix
- Distributed by: Netflix
- Release dates: January 2020 (Sundance); August 20, 2020 (Netflix)
- Running time: 16 minutes
- Country: United States
- Language: English

John Was Trying to Contact Aliens is a 2020 documentary film directed by Matthew Killip and starring John Shepherd. It tells the story of John Shepherd, who tried to contact aliens by broadcasting music into space for over 30 years with his state-of-the-art broadcasting equipment.

== Cast ==
- John Shepherd as himself.

== Release ==
John Was Trying to Contact Aliens was premiered at the 2020 Sundance Film Festival. It was released on August 20, 2020, on Netflix.

== Awards ==
The film won the Sundance Film Festival Short Film Jury Award for Nonfiction in 2020.
