= Whipped (2020 film) =

2020 Indonesian film

- Film poster with original theatrical release date
- Indonesian: Bucin
- Directed by: Chandra Liow
- Written by: Jovial Da Lopez
- Produced by: Gope T. Samtani
- Starring: Andovi Da Lopez; Jovial Da Lopez; Chandra Liow; Tommy Limm; Susan Sameh
- Cinematography: M Firdaus
- Edited by: Ryan Purwoko
- Music by: Andhika Triyadi
- Production company: Rapi Films
- Distributed by: Netflix
- Release date: September 18, 2020
- Running time: 97 minutes
- Country: Indonesia
- Language: Indonesian

Whipped (Indonesian: Bucin, stylized as WHiPPED) is a 2020 Indonesian comedy film directed by Chandra Liow, written by Jovial Da Lopez and Tanya Yuson and starring Andovi Da Lopez, Jovial Da Lopez and Tommy Limm. The plot revolves around four men, Andovi, Jovial, Chandra and Tommy, who joins a programme to improve their love lives. The film was released on September 18, 2020 on Netflix.

== Cast ==
- Andovi Da Lopez as Andovi
- Jovial Da Lopez as Jovi
- Tommy Limm as Tommy
- Chandra Liow as Chandra
- Susan Sameh as Vania
- Karina Salim as Julia
- Kezia Aletheia as Cilla
- Ibob Tarigan as Indra
- Widika Sidmore as Kirana
- Gading Marten
- Deddy Corbuzier
- Uus
- Helmy Yahya
- Niniek L. Karim
- Yudha Keling

== Release ==
The film was released direct-to-streaming on September 18, 2020 by Netflix.
