= Dance Dreams: Hot Chocolate Nutcracker =

- Official release poster
- Directed by: Oliver Bokelberg
- Produced by: Oliver Bokelberg; Mark Monroe
- Starring: Debbie Allen
- Cinematography: Oliver Bokelberg
- Music by: Jongnic Bontemps
- Production company: Shondaland
- Distributed by: Netflix
- Release date: November 27, 2020
- Running time: 80 minutes
- Country: United States
- Language: English

Dance Dreams: Hot Chocolate Nutcracker is an American documentary film directed by Oliver Bokelberg. The film follows Debbie Allen and her students at the Debbie Allen Dance Academy and offers a behind-the-scenes look as they prepare for their annual award-winning holiday version of The Nutcracker, called Hot Chocolate Nutcracker.

It was produced by Shondaland and was released on Netflix on November 27, 2020.
