= LA Originals =

2020 documentary film

- Film poster
- Directed by: Estevan Oriol
- Written by: Brian Maya; Omar Quiroga
- Starring: Estevan Oriol; Mister Cartoon
- Production company: Underground Contenidos
- Distributed by: Netflix
- Release date: April 10, 2020
- Running time: 92 minutes
- Countries: United States; Argentina
- Language: English

LA Originals is a 2020 documentary film directed by Estevan Oriol, written by Brian Maya and Omar Quiroga and starring Estevan Oriol and Mister Cartoon. The premise revolves around the Los Angeles–based artists Mark Machado (Mister Cartoon) and Estevan Oriol with Latino roots.

== Cast ==
- Estevan Oriol
- Eminem
- Mister Cartoon
- Snoop Dogg
- Clifton Collins Jr.
- Theo Rossi
- Eric Haze
- Revok
- Wilmer Valderrama
- George Lopez
- Travis Barker
- Michelle Rodriguez
- Kobe Bryant
- Ryan Phillippe
- Tony Touch
- David Choe
- Danny Trejo
- Terry Crews
- Jason Blum
- Brian Grazer

== Release ==
LA Originals was released on April 10, 2020, on Netflix.
