= A Life of Speed: The Juan Manuel Fangio Story =

2020 documentary film

- Film poster
- Spanish: Fangio: El hombre que domaba las máquinas
- Directed by: Francisco Macri
- Starring: Fernando Alonso; Jackie Stewart; Mika Häkkinen
- Production companies: Cinema 7 Films; Fox Sports; Netflix
- Distributed by: Netflix
- Release date: March 20, 2020
- Running time: 92 minutes
- Country: Argentina
- Languages: Spanish; English; Italian; German

A Life of Speed: The Juan Manuel Fangio Story (Spanish: Fangio: El hombre que domaba las máquinas, lit. 'Fangio: The man who tamed the machines') is a 2020 documentary film directed by Francisco Macri and starring Fernando Alonso, Jackie Stewart and Mika Häkkinen. The premise revolves around Juan Manuel Fangio in the 1950s, and how he won five championships driving for four different carmakers in the F1 circuit.

== Cast ==
- Fernando Alonso
- Jackie Stewart
- Mika Häkkinen
- Alain Prost
- Juan Manuel Fangio
- Toto Wolff
- Carlos Reutemann
- Nico Rosberg
- Hans Herrmann
- Horacio Pagani
- Andrew Bell

== Release ==
A Life of Speed: The Juan Manuel Fangio Story was released on March 20, 2020, on Netflix.
