= Indonesian National Armed Forces Reserve Component =

Reserve military unit of the Indonesian National Armed Forces

- Komponen Cadangan Tentara Nasional Indonesia
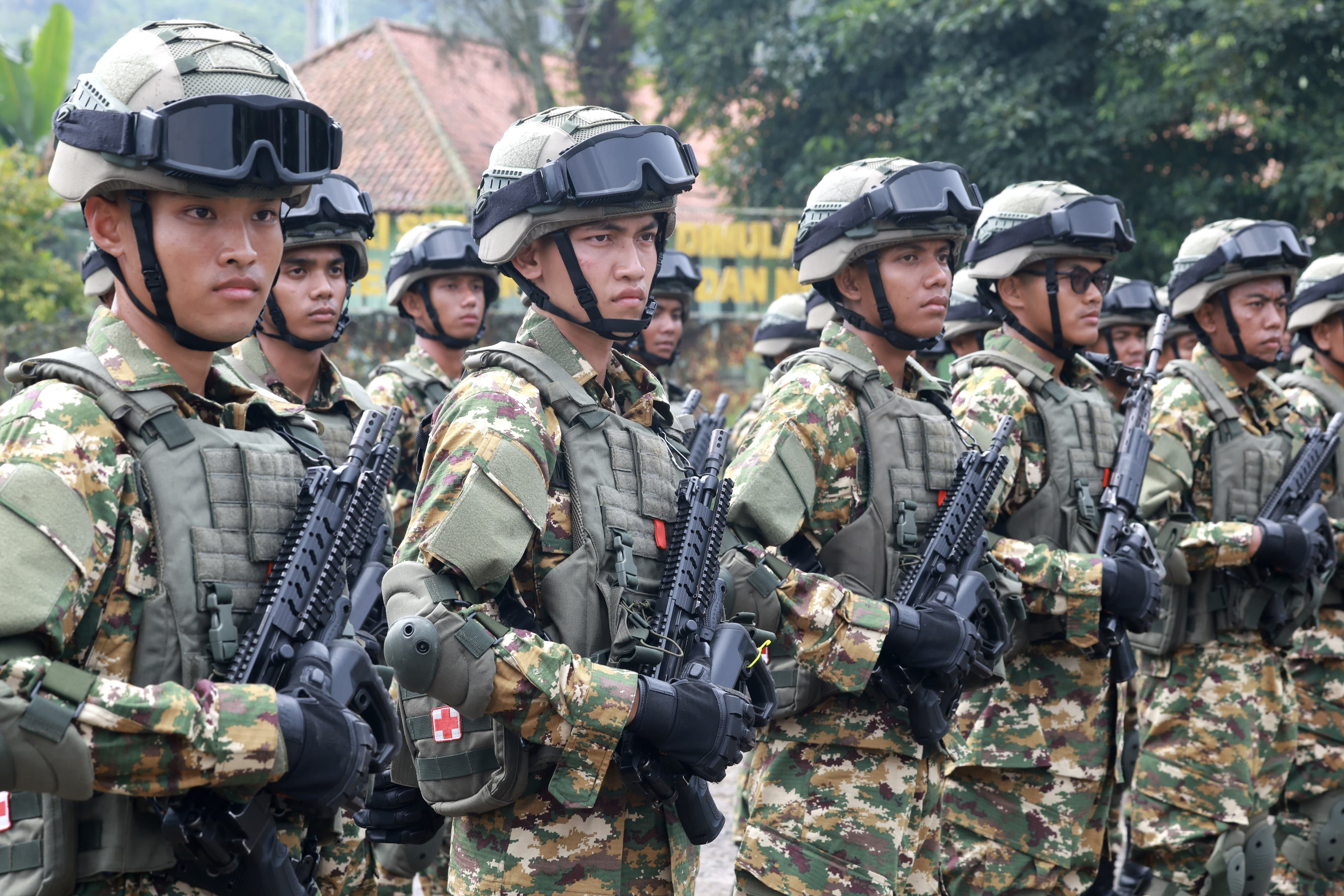
- Members of the Reserve Component
- Active: 2021–present
- Country: Indonesia
- Branch: Indonesian Army; Indonesian Navy; Indonesian Air Force
- Type: Military reserve force
- Size: 12,226 (as of 2024)
- Part of: Indonesian National Armed Forces
- Nickname: Komcad
- March: Mars Komponen Cadangan

Insignia
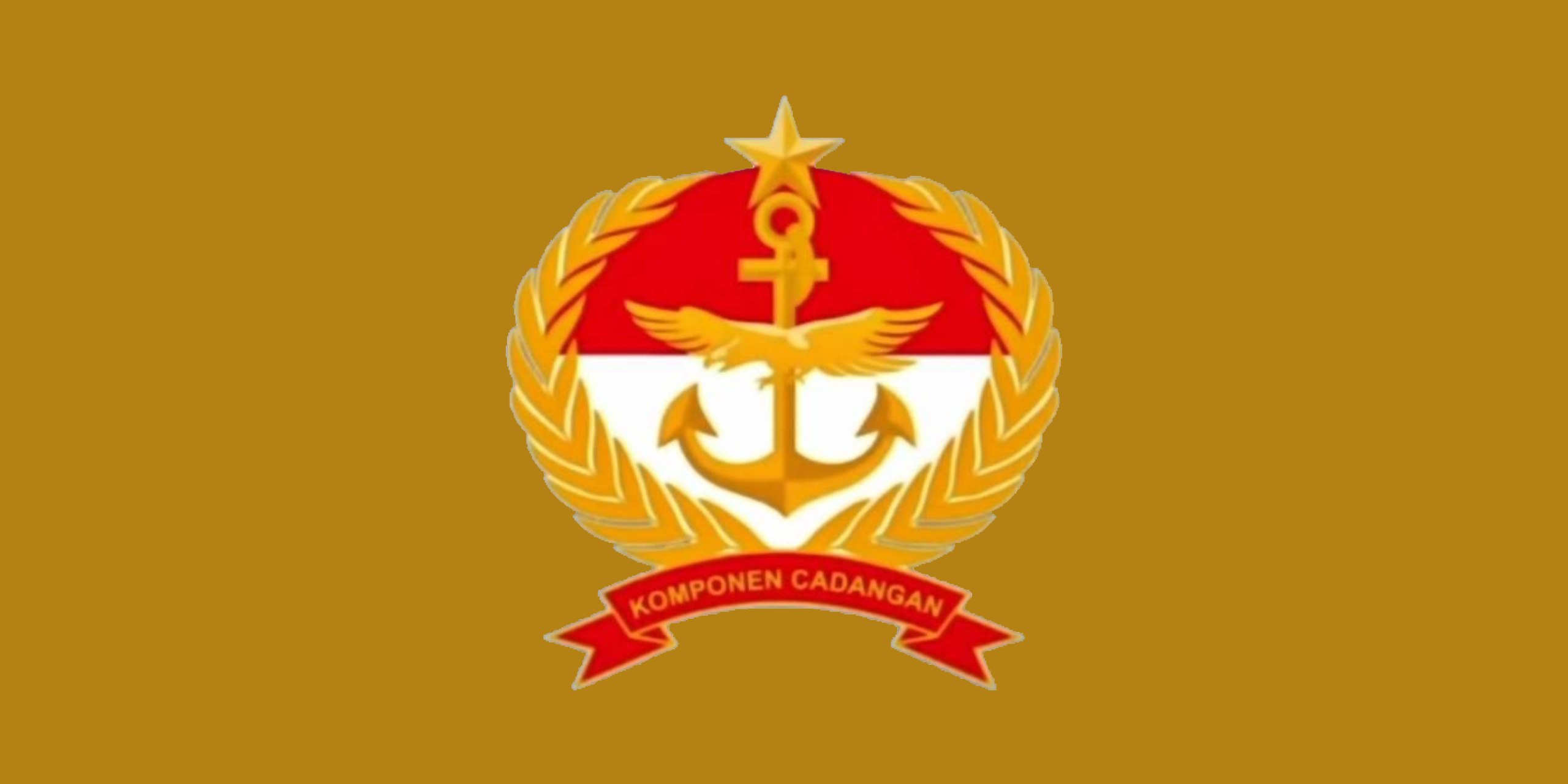
- Flag

The Reserve Component of the Indonesian National Armed Forces (Indonesian: Komponen Cadangan Tentara Nasional Indonesia, abbreviated as Komcad TNI) is the military reserve force of Indonesia, jointly managed under the General Headquarters of the Indonesian National Armed Forces (Tentara Nasional Indonesia or TNI) and the Indonesian Ministry of Defense (Kementerian Pertahanan).

== Overview ==
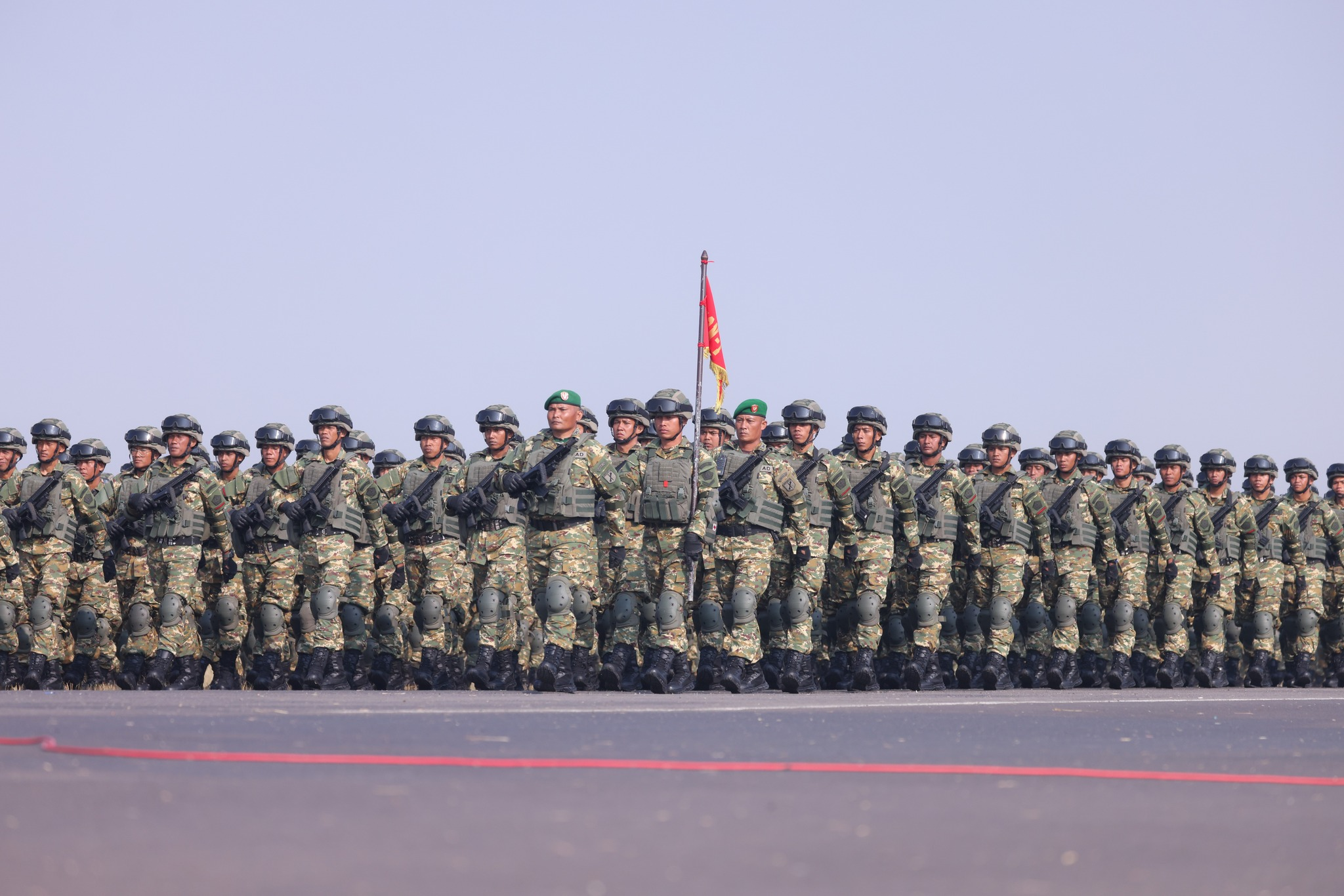
Reserve Component troops conducting a parade at ceremony in 2023

The reserve was formed as the result of the implementation of the 2019 National Resource Management for State Defense Act (Undang-Undang Nomor 23 Tahun 2019 tentang Pengelolaan Sumber Daya Nasional untuk Pertahanan Negara) through Government Regulation No. 3/2021 and Defense Ministerial Regulation No. 3/2021. The word 'component' refers to the three aspects of Indonesian state defense resource management, as follow:

- Principal component (Komponen utama) refers to the Indonesian National Armed Forces and military resources;
- Reserve component (Komponen cadangan) refers to the voluntary, part-time armed reserve force and other potential reserve resource and facilities, ready to be mobilized at any moment;
- Support component (Komponen pendukung) refers to the Indonesian National Police, police resources, and others trained citizens (such as retired military and police personnel, as well as other civilian security forces) and resources.

The reserve force is meant to augment and directly support the principal component through mobilization in order to defend the state from military and hybrid threats both at home and abroad.

== Personnel ==
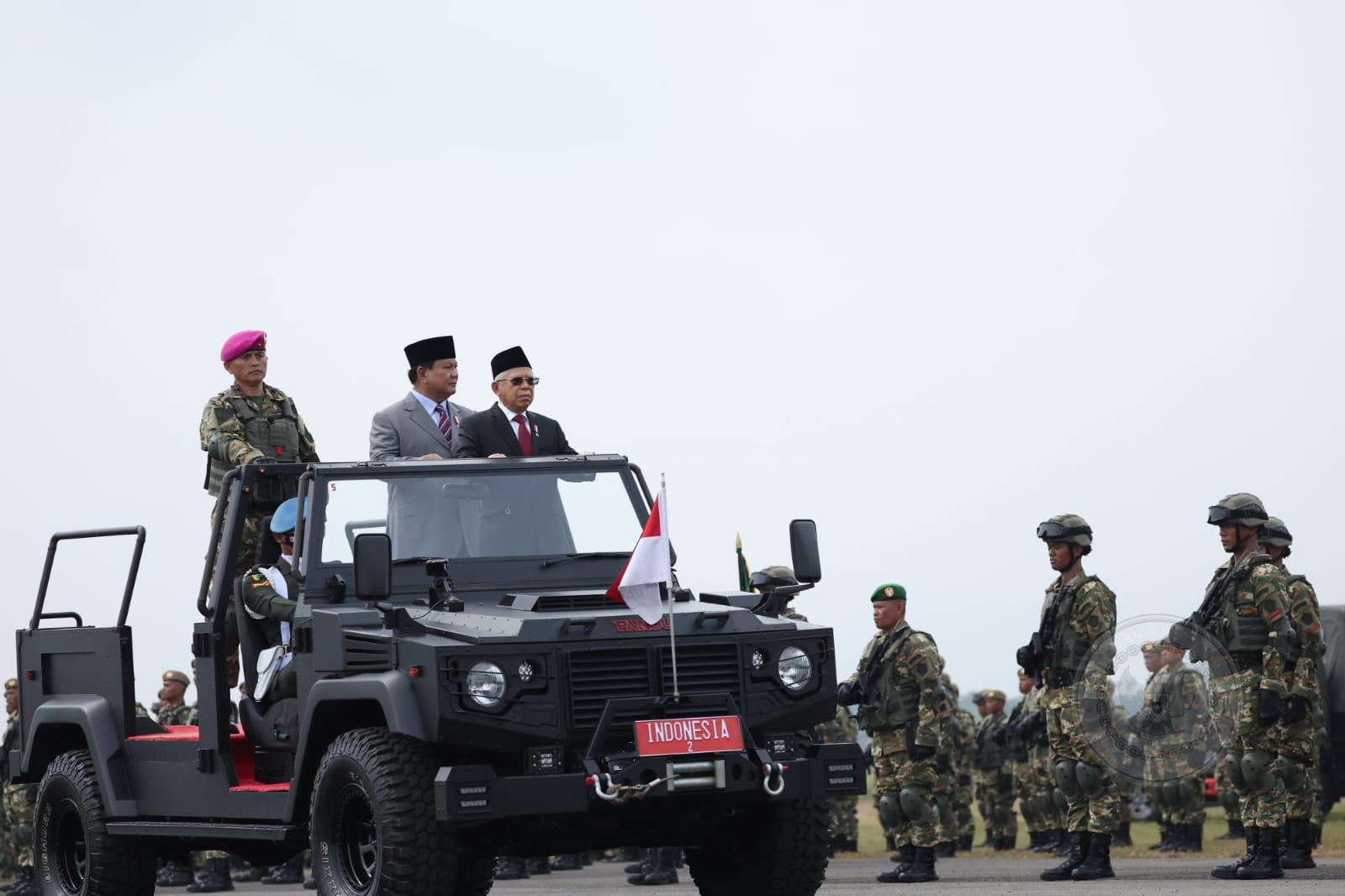
Vice President Ma'ruf Amin with Defense Minister Prabowo Subianto inspecting the Komcad personnel in September 2022

The reserve component are grouped into the three branch of the military: land, sea, and air reserves, and can be mobilized by the president in times of war or national emergency, with the permission of the People's Representative Council.

=== Recruitment ===
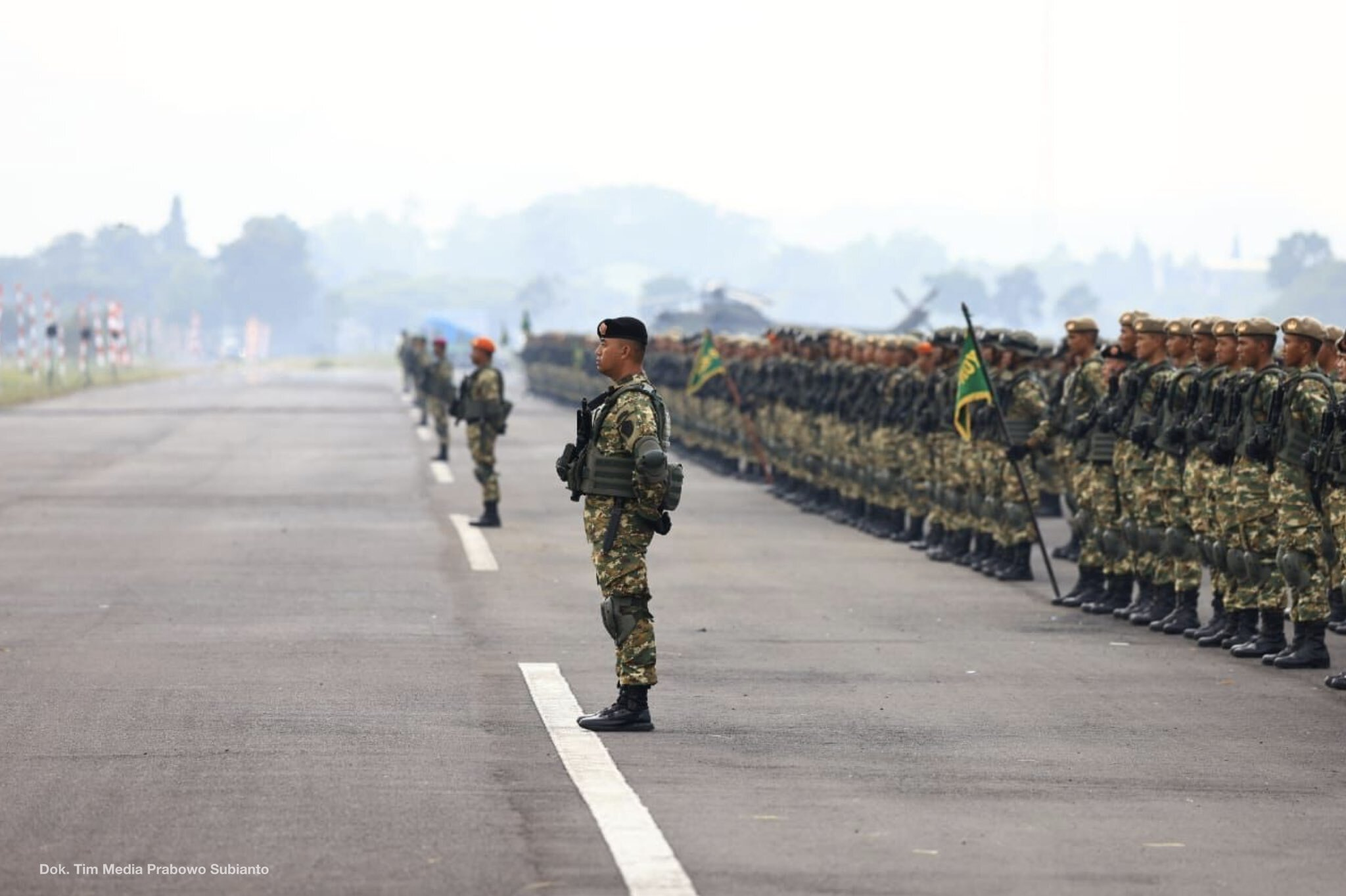
The Reserve Component in formation during a parade. It can be seen wearing a different camo pattern than that of the DPM camo.

Reservists are drawn from the male and female citizenry who are not currently serving in the armed forces or national police, and this service is entirely voluntary. This includes university students, members of the Indonesian Civil Service, and other working individuals who can apply and join the reserve without interrupting their studies or employment.

To qualify, recruits must be between 18 and 35 years old on the first day of basic military training, maintain good physical and mental health, possess a clean criminal record as verified by a police statement, and have at least a junior high school diploma (equivalent to middle school).

Local reserve recruitment committees, supervised by a central committee, oversee the entire recruitment process. The process evaluates candidates based on their health, physical and mental fitness, as well as conducting personnel and administrative assessments. Selection criteria also encompass general knowledge, psychological evaluations, and interviews.

=== Training ===
Following the recruitment process, the reserve recruits will have to complete a three-month basic military training at their local military training regiments (such as by army Rindams, though not necessarily army, as naval and air force training facilities and personnel may be used), or directly trained by active available army, naval, or air force units in the areas were they live.

To carry out this education, the TNI Reserve Component Troops can attend education in the Training Unit in accordance with the dimensions taken and in education the TNI Reserve Component Troops (Komcad) are divided into four Education Units. The position of each educational unit is as follows:

- Army Reserve Training Unit at the nearest Rindam/Kodam.
- Air Force Reserve Training Unit at Education Wing 800/Kopasgat, Sulaiman Air Force Base, Bandung.
- Naval Reserve Training Unit at Kodiklatal, Kodikmar, Surabaya (for all Indonesian Navy reservists).
- Indonesian Defense University Student Cadet's Training Unit at the Military Academy, Magelang.

Recruits will receive allowance, field uniforms, healthcare, workplace insurance, and life insurance for the duration of their training.

Recruits who managed to complete their training, will then be sworn in as reservists. They will receive military ranks, though only applicable during their active duty (masa aktif), and will also receive reservist ID numbers. The reserve ranks will be based on their education level:

- Recruits with a vocational diploma (D-III and D-IV), received a bachelor's degree (S1), or achieved a professional certification (such as board-certified doctors, nurses, and surveyors) will receive an officer's (Perwira) commission in the Armed Forces as a Second Lieutenant (Letnan Dua) in the Reserve;
- Recruits with a senior high school diploma (SMA) or its equivalent will receive an NCO (Bintara) rank of Sergeant (Sersan Dua); and
- Recruits with a junior high school diploma (SMP) or its equivalent will be welcomed into the ranks of the enlisted (Tamtama) and hold the rank of Private/Airman/Seaman Recruit (Prajurit Dua/Kelasi Dua).

=== Active and inactive durations ===
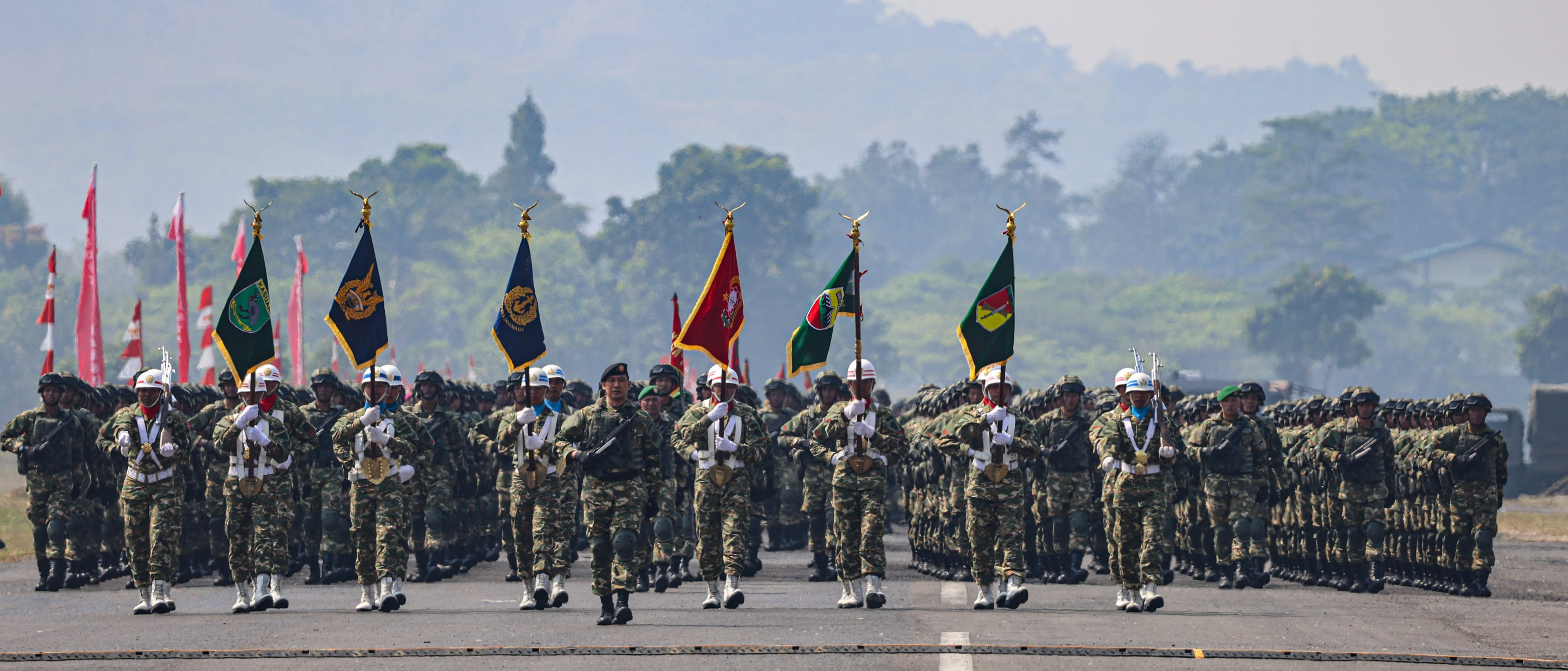
Komcad troops in parade, 2023.

Reservists may receive base allowance, operational allowance (only when the reserve is mobilized), healthcare, workplace and life insurance, and awards. These awards include any veterans' awards if they are mobilized, and reservists' brevet to mark their service.

The reserves are summoned to active duty only when (1) a general mobilization has been announced by the president in times of national emergency or war, and (2) a call for refresher training (pelatihan penyegaran). A refresher training may last between 12 and 90 days, and may be conducted by a local military training regiments in base, in combat training sites, or by other battalion-sized units.

During active duty, reservists are to be considered service personnel who are part of the armed forces, and thus subject to military law and regulations established by law.

Reservists' active duty will end until they are (1) demobilized, or (2) completed their refresher training.

During the reserve's inactive duration, their field equipment and uniform are to be kept at their unit base, are not allowed to keep their firearms, and are expected to be called to active duty at any moment.

=== Discharge ===
Reservists of the Reserve Component can be honorably discharged if:

1. reached the age of 48;
2. suffered from ill health which may prevent a reservist to be called to active duty;
3. died in combat, during active duties, or during inactive times;
4. missing in action during active duties, 6 months after declared missing;
5. resign for personal reasons; and
6. involuntarily lost their Indonesian citizenship.

On the other hand, reservists can also receive a dishonorable discharge if:

1. follow and spread ideologies incompatible with Pancasila;
2. become a member of a banned organization;
3. threaten and endanger the safety and security of the state;
4. conducting undesirable and undisciplined behaviors, which may include:
  - suicide or suicide attempts;
  - desertion from active duties or did not answer the call to active duties;
  - other unethical, improper, or disrespectful acts.
5. convicted of a crime, which resulted in prison time sentence of at least 1 year;
6. voluntarily lost their Indonesian citizenship.
