= The Claudia Kishi Club =

2020 short documentary film

- Film poster
- Directed by: Sue Ding
- Distributed by: Netflix
- Release date: July 10, 2020
- Running time: 17 minutes
- Country: United States
- Language: English

The Claudia Kishi Club is a 2020 short documentary film directed by Sue Ding.

== Background and synopsis ==
The Claudia Kishi Club revolves around Claudia Kishi, a character from Ann M. Martin's novel series The Baby-Sitters Club. A Japanese-American, Claudia was a notable exception to a dearth of Asian-American characters in children's literature, particularly a character that had a large reach as a part of a popular series and often resisted stereotype. Sue Ding told the Daily Bruin that in 2013, she noticed an outbreak of content from Asian-Americans about Claudia; in 2018, she successfully crowdfunded a documentary project.

In The Claudia Kishi Club, director Sue Ding interviews multiple Asian-Americans who grew up with The Baby-Sitters Club, discussing the impact Claudia had on them as a child. The interviewees include Naia Cucukov, producer of a 2020 TV adaptation of The Baby-Sitters Club; Sarah Kuhn, a sci-fi novelist; Gale Galligan, a graphic novelist; C. B. Lee, an author; Phil Yu, a blogger known as "Angry Asian Man" who circulated memes of reworked covers of The Baby-Sitters Club such as "Claudia and the Racist Little Shits"; and Yumi Sakugawa, an artist who created a 2013 zine titled "Claudia Kishi: My Asian-American Female Role Model of the 90's [sic]", which was noticed by Ding in 2013 and featured in the documentary.

== Release and reception ==
The Claudia Kishi Club premiered July 10, 2020.
