= Casa Vega =

Coordinates: 34°8′48.5″N 118°25′22″W

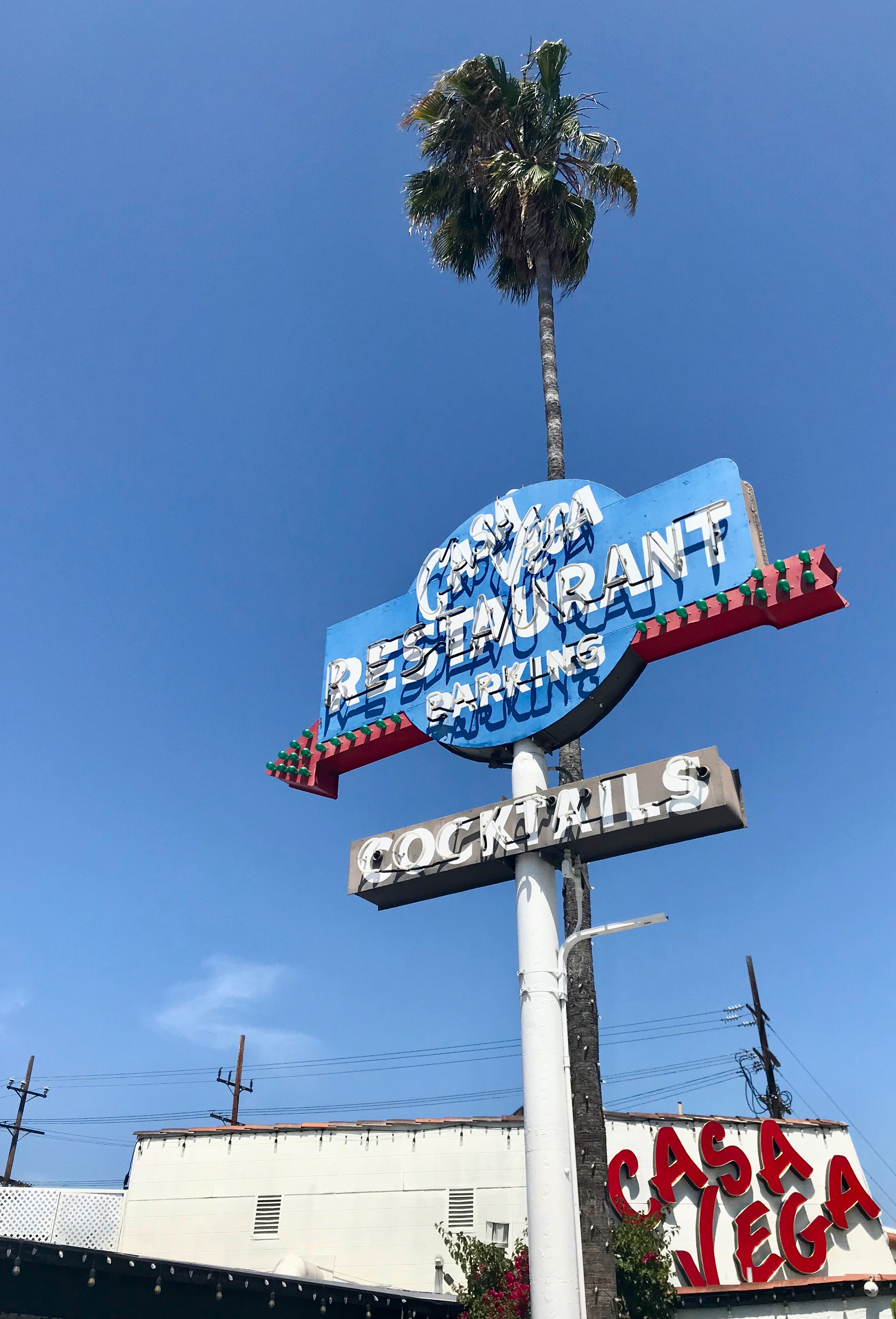
- The restaurant's neon roadside sign.
- Interactive map of Casa Vega

Restaurant information
- Established: 1956; 70 years ago
- Food type: Mexican cuisine
- Location: 13301 Ventura Blvd., Sherman Oaks, California, 91423, United States
- Website: www.casavega.com

Casa Vega is a restaurant in Sherman Oaks, California. In 2022 it was named one of America's Classics by the James Beard Foundation.

== History ==
The restaurant was opened by Rafael Vega, whose mother crossed the U.S.-Mexico border into National City in 1934 to give birth to him, in 1956 when he was 22. It is located at the corner of Ventura Blvd. and Fulton Avenue. At the time it was one of the few restaurants serving Mexican cuisine located outside the Olvera Street area; Vega's parents, who had immigrated from Tijuana, had operated a restaurant in Olvera Street.

Many employees have worked there for decades. According to the Los Angeles Daily News and the Hollywood Reporter, actors such as Jane Fonda, Marlon Brando, Cary Grant, Dean Martin and Desi Arnaz were regulars from time of the restaurant's beginnings and the restaurant continued to attract high-profile Hollywood people, such as Dakota Fanning, Charlize Theron and Sandra Bullock, over the subsequent decades.

Portions of the 2019 Movie Once Upon a Time in Hollywood were shot at the restaurant.

== Menu ==
The menu focuses on staples of Mexican cuisine such as flautas, tostadas, tamales, enchiladas, and albondigas.

== Recognition ==
In 2022 the restaurant was named one of America's Classics by the James Beard Foundation, which credited it for popularizing Mexican cuisine in the area. The Infatuation called it "easily one of LA’s most recognizable Mexican restaurants". According to Eater LA it is "one of Los Angeles’s most beloved restaurants". CBS News called it "iconic". People Magazine called it "a fixture in LA".

== Ownership ==
The restaurant was taken over by Vega's daughter, Christina Vega, in 2012. Rafael Vega died in 2021 of COVID.

== Gallery ==
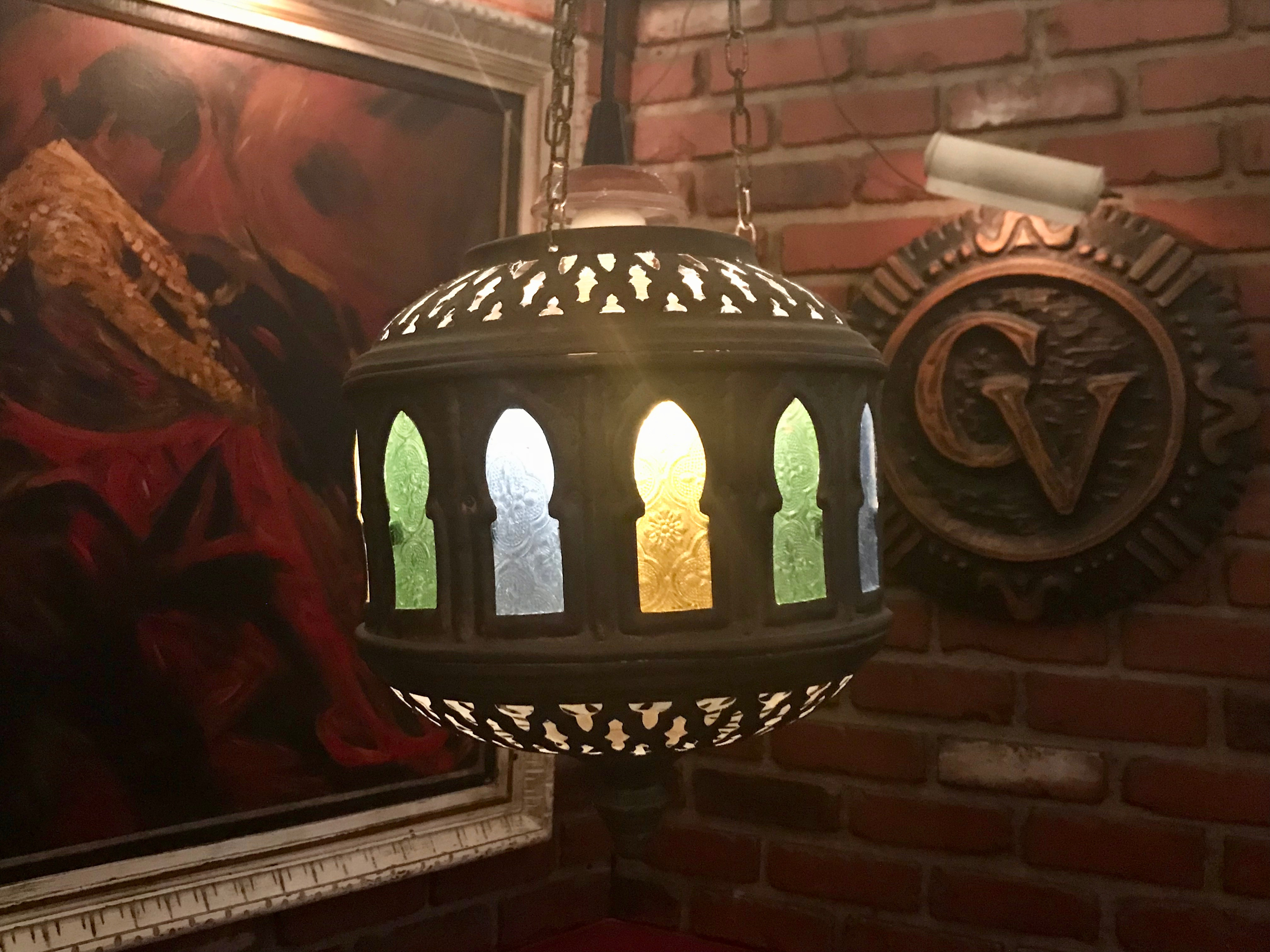

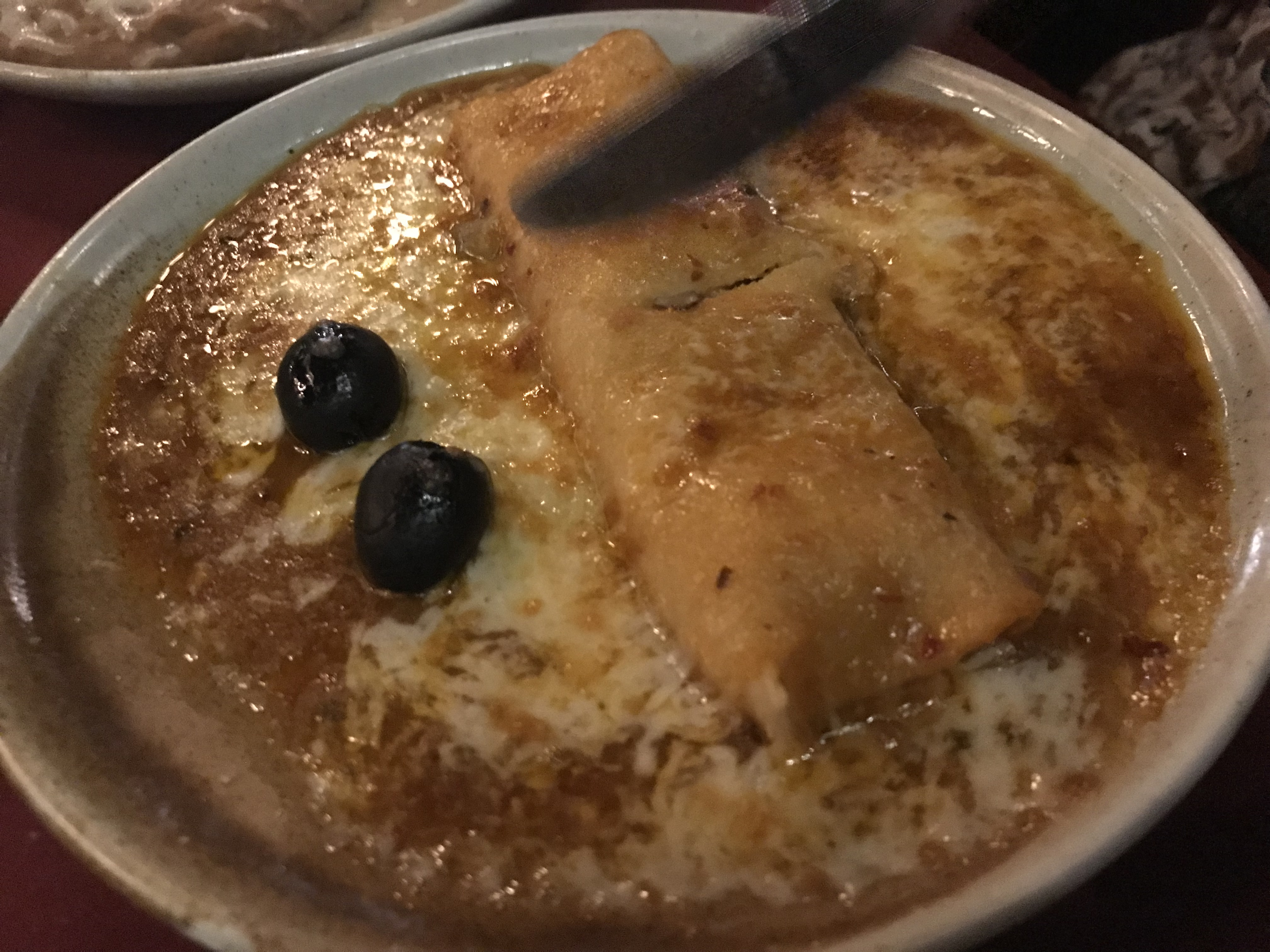
A Casa Vega enchilada.

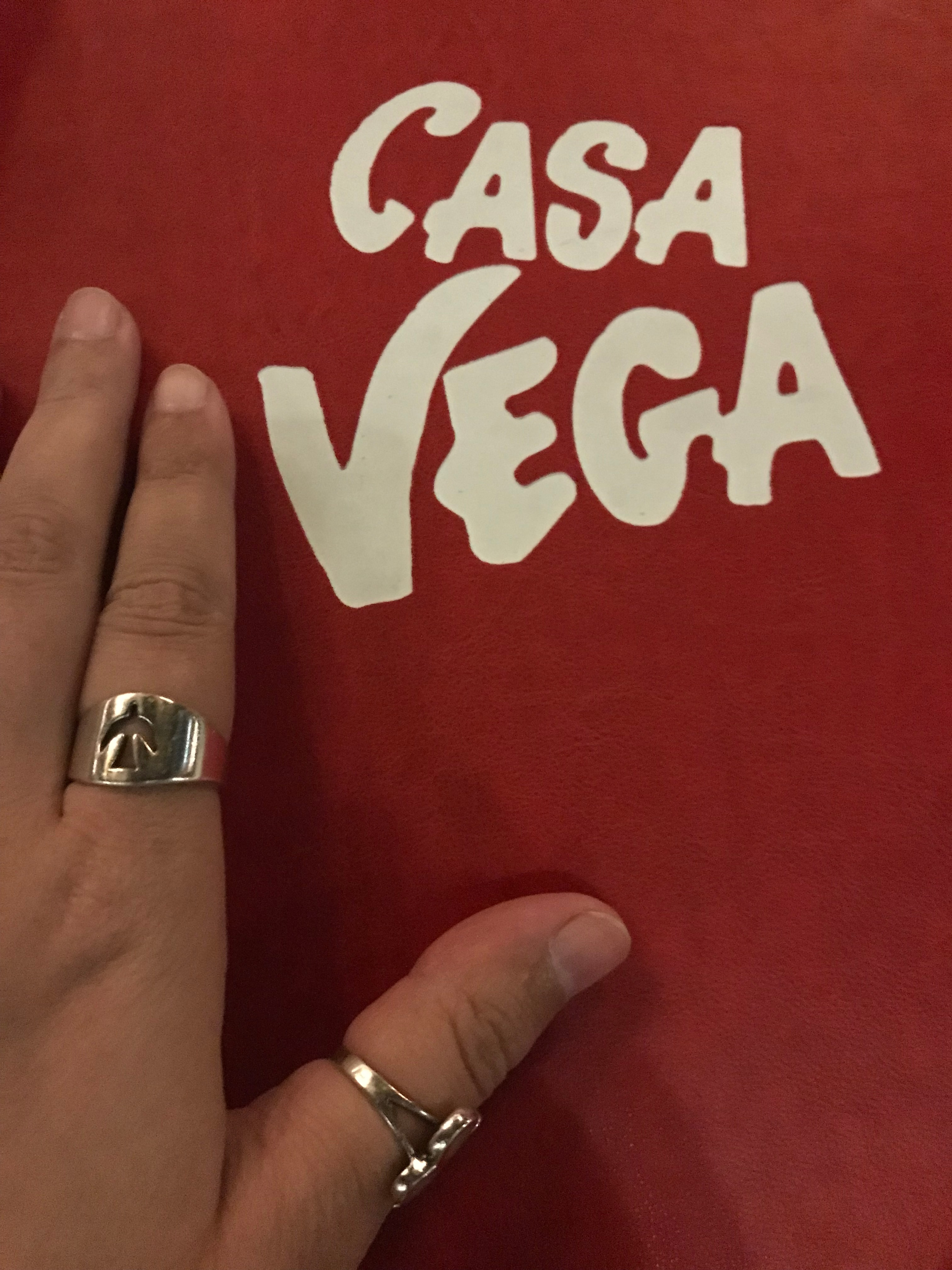
Casa Vega menu.

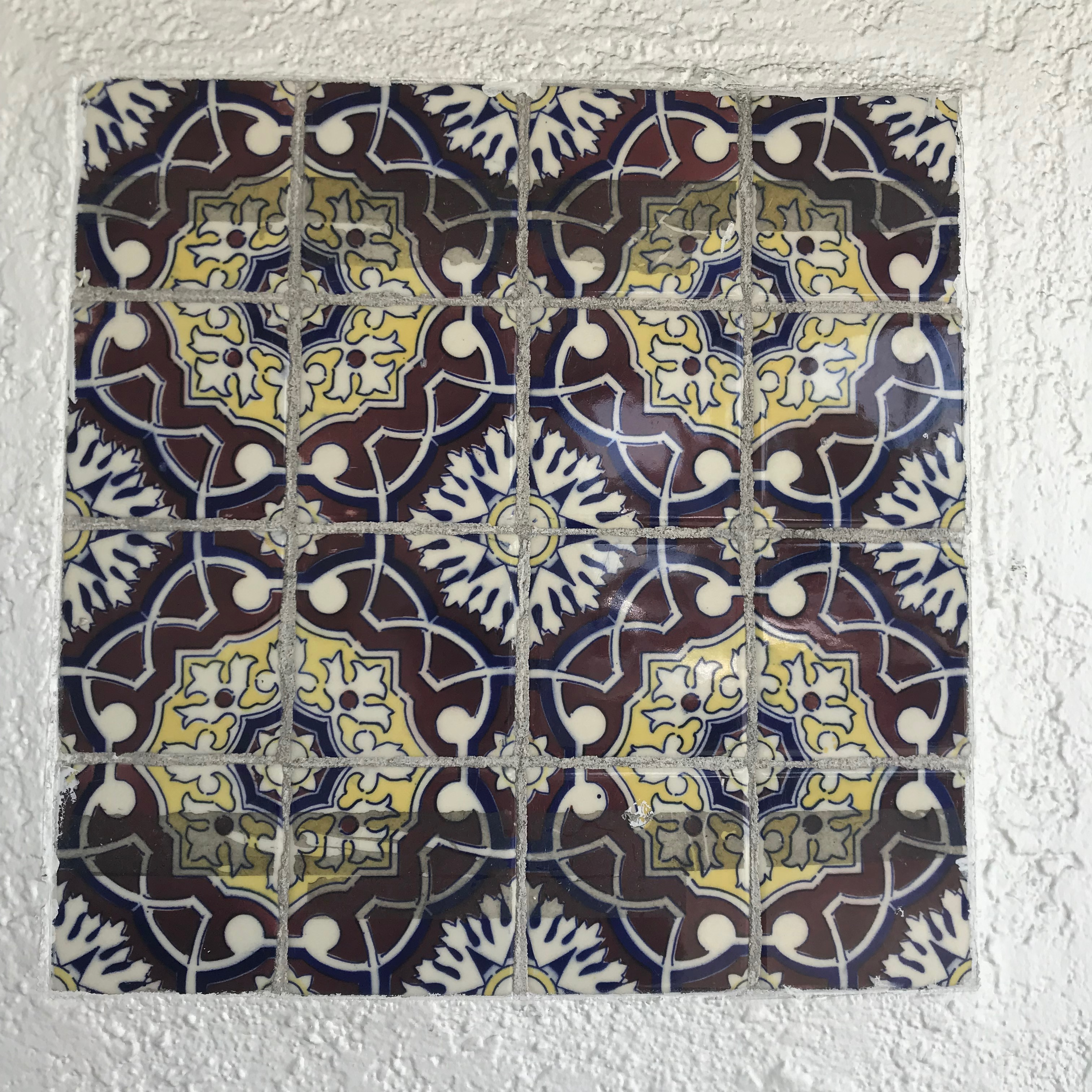

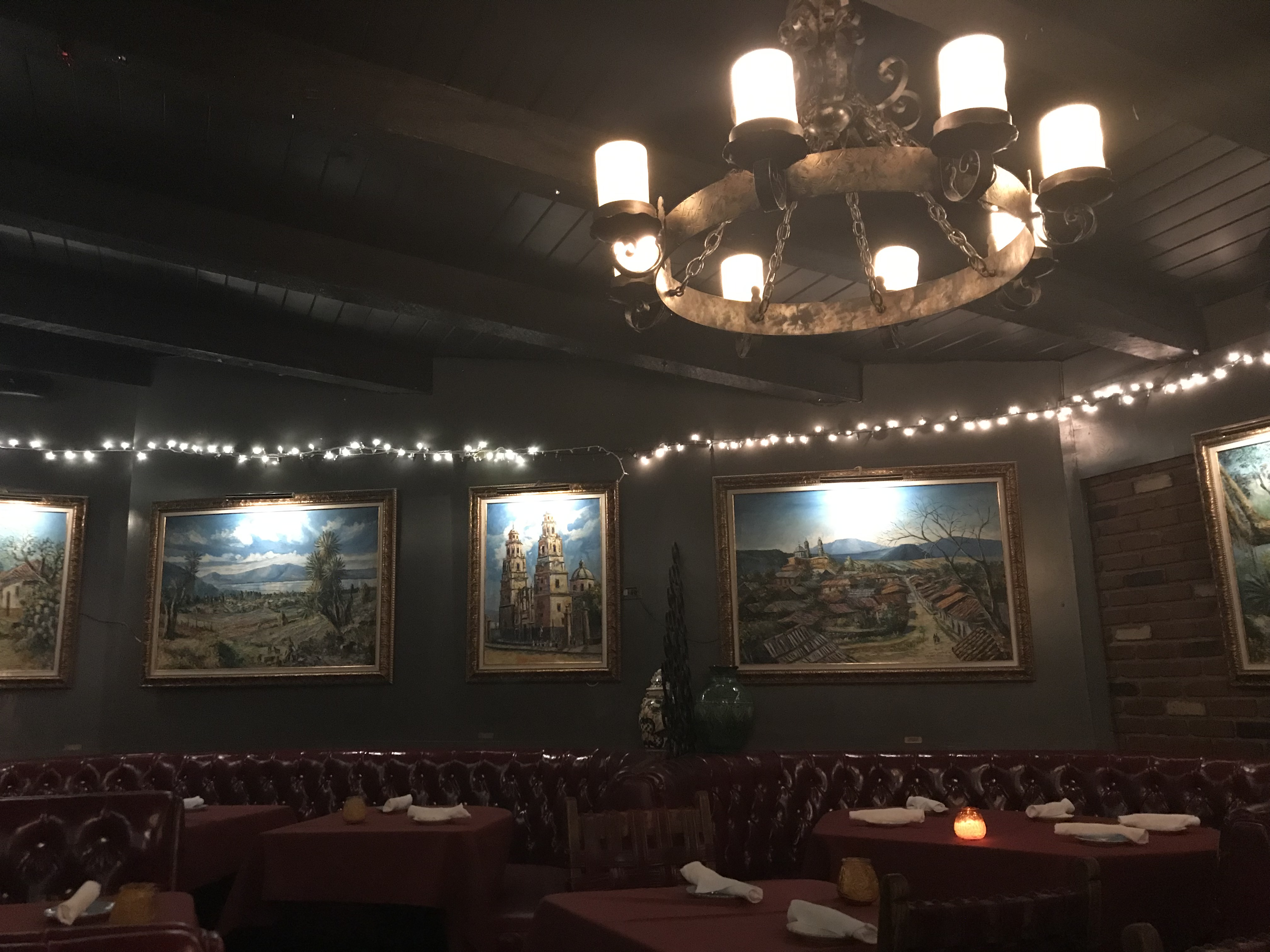
One of the dining rooms at Casa Vega.

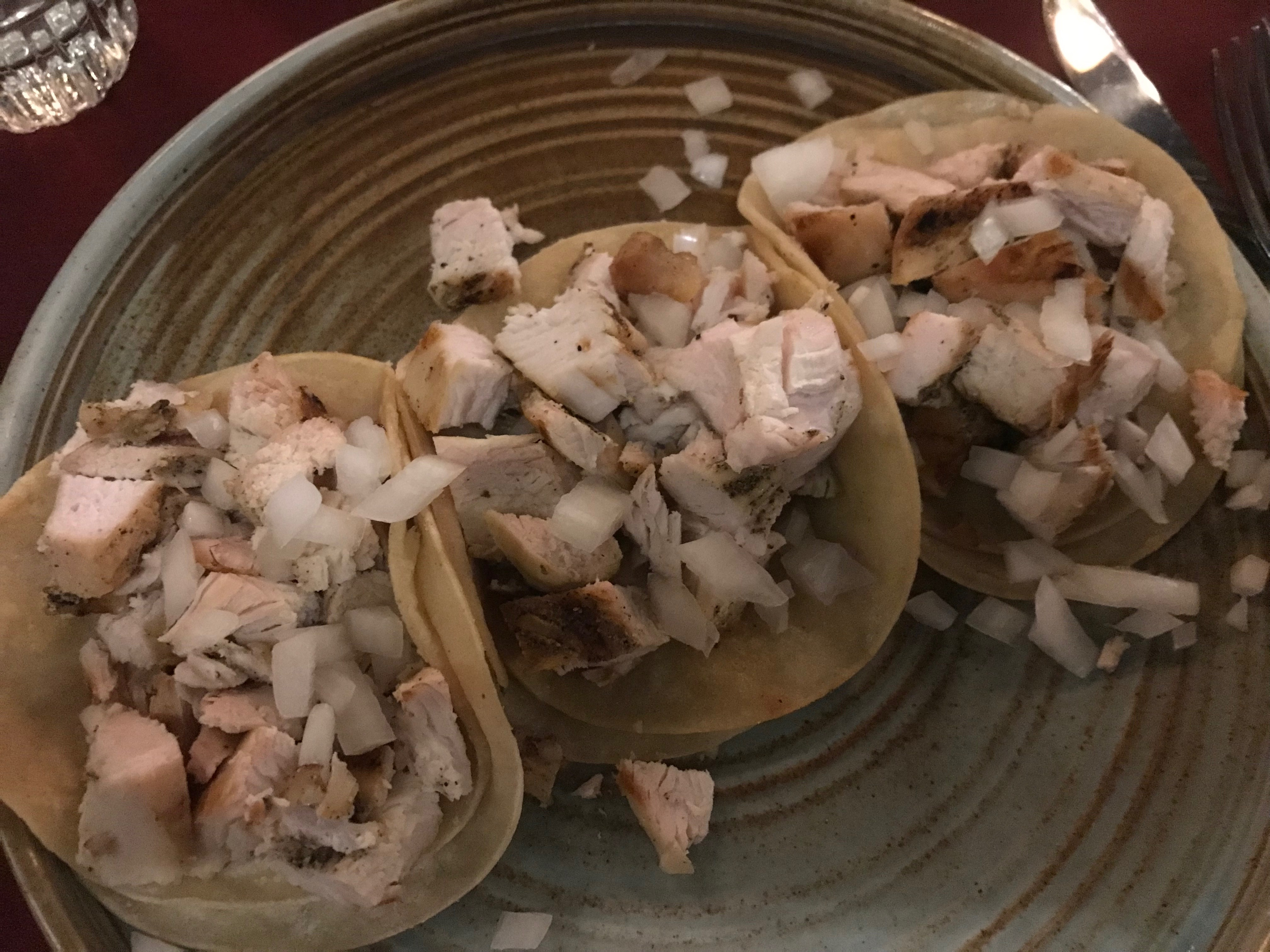
Chicken soft tacos at Casa Vega.

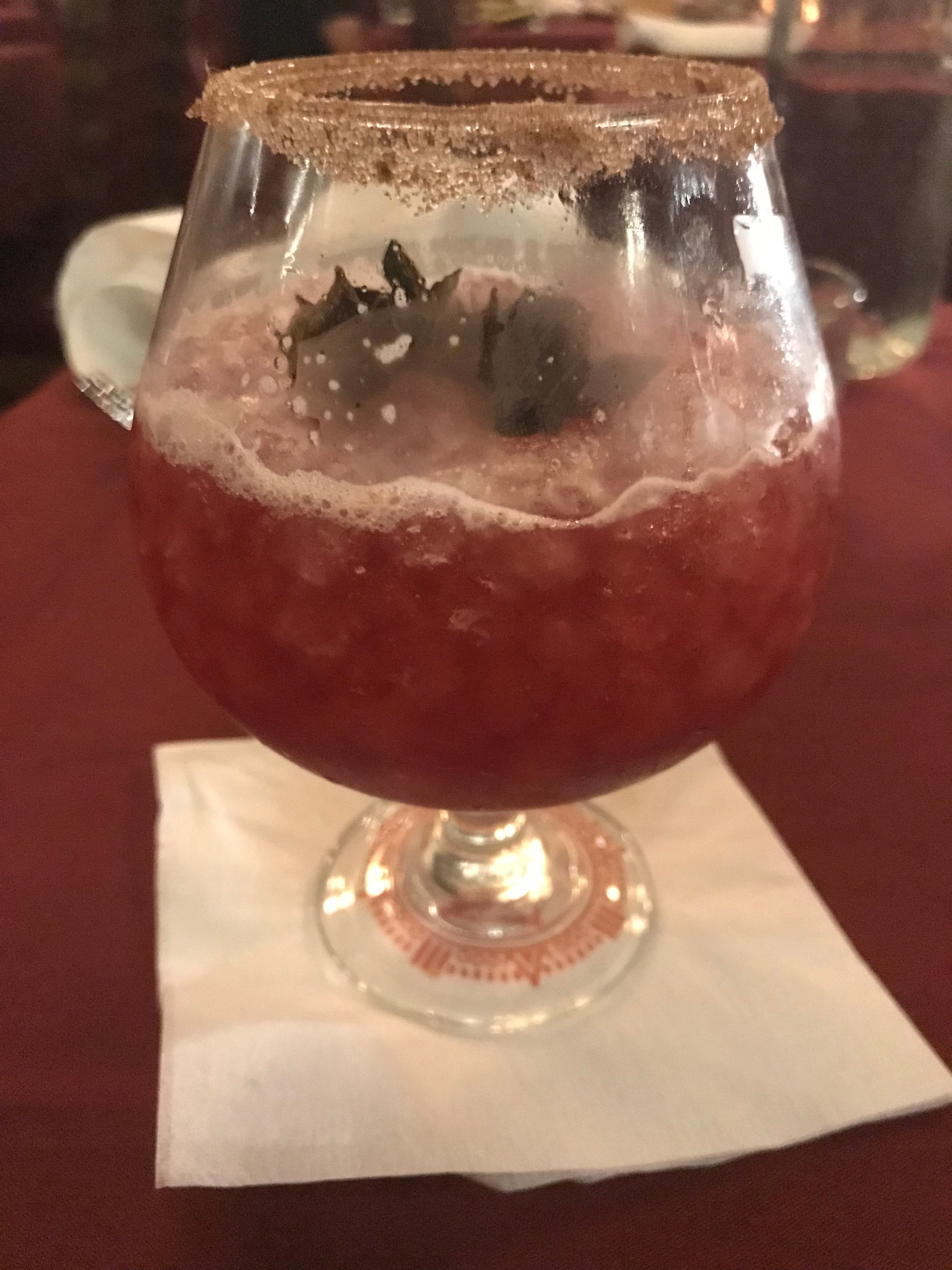
A spice hibiscus margarita mocktail at Casa Vega.

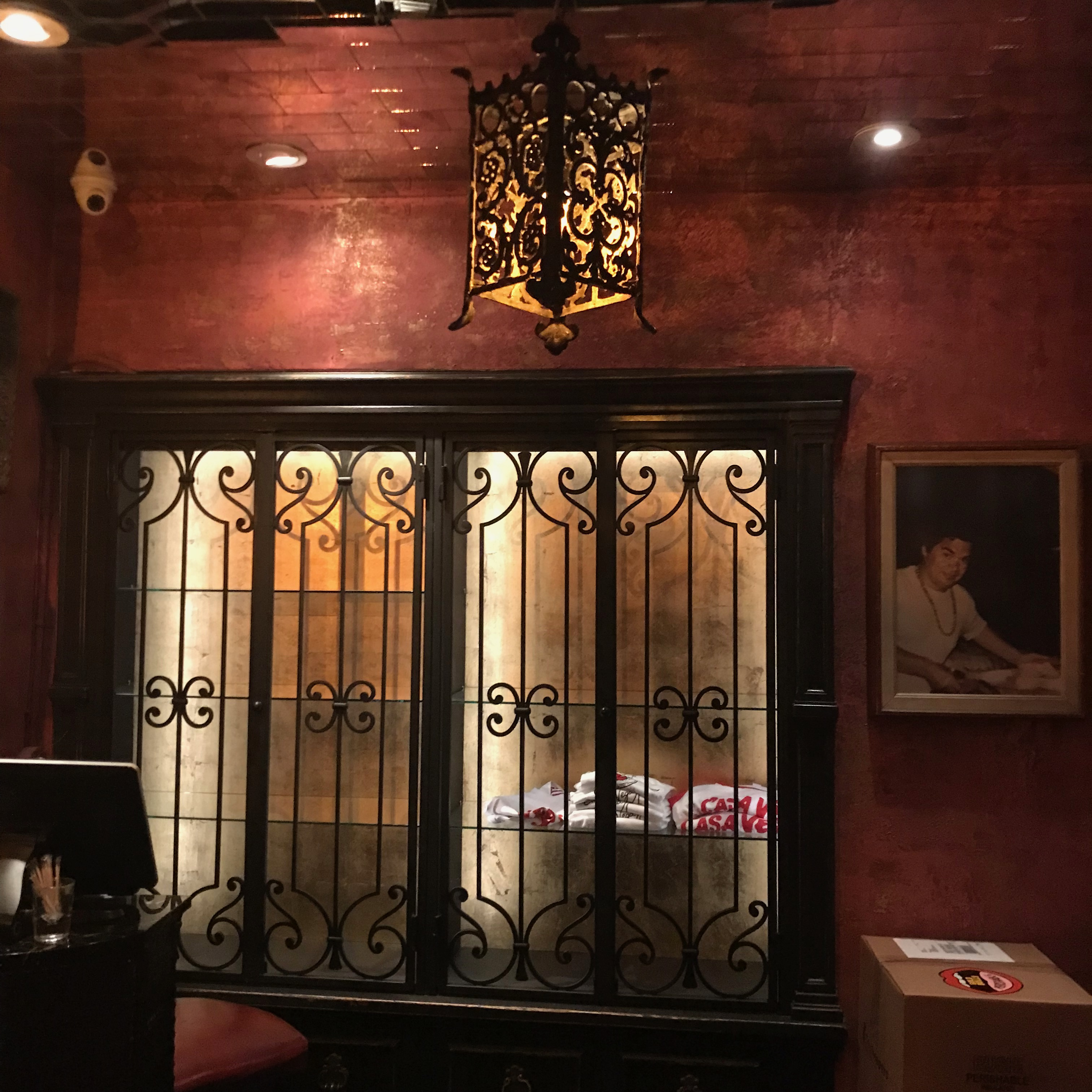

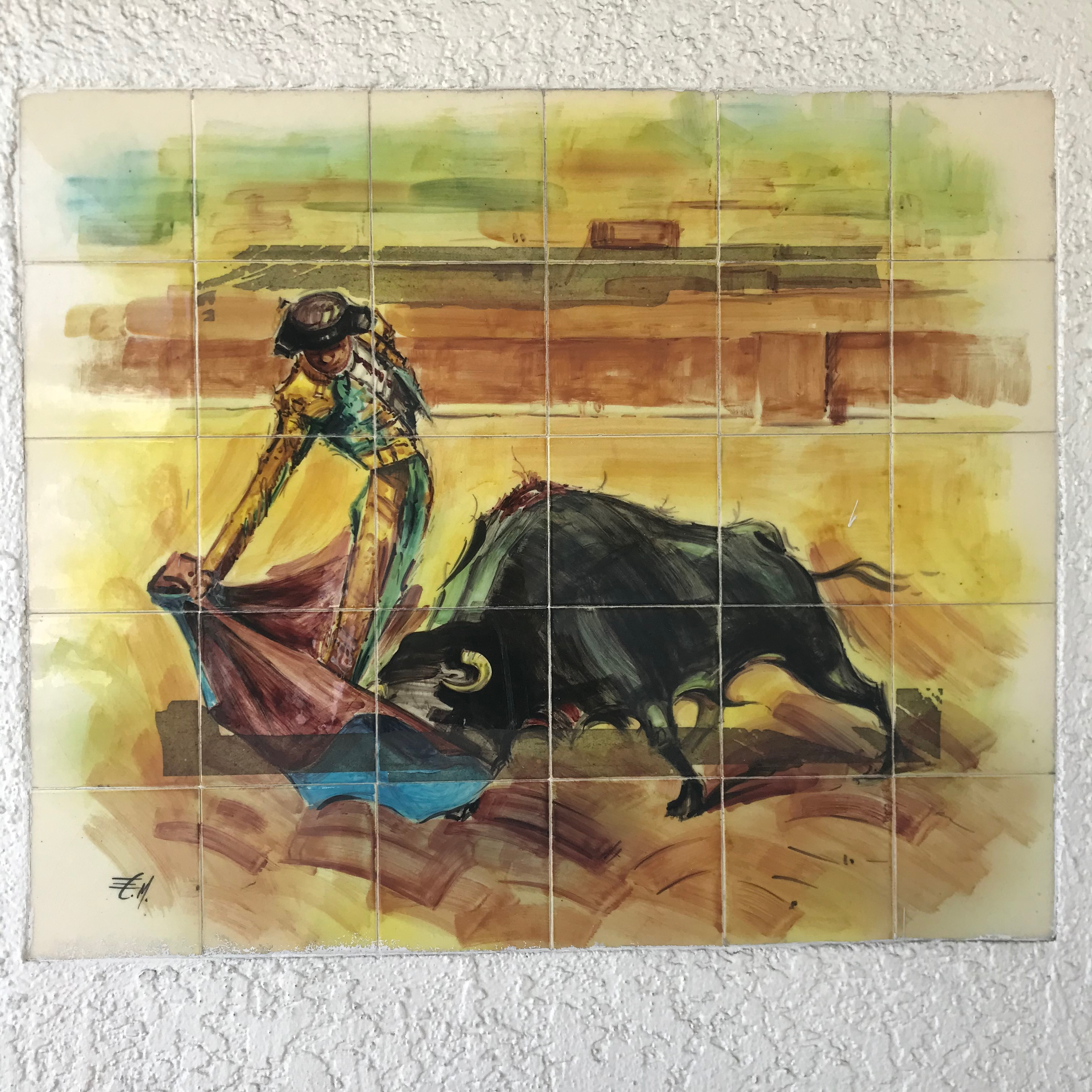

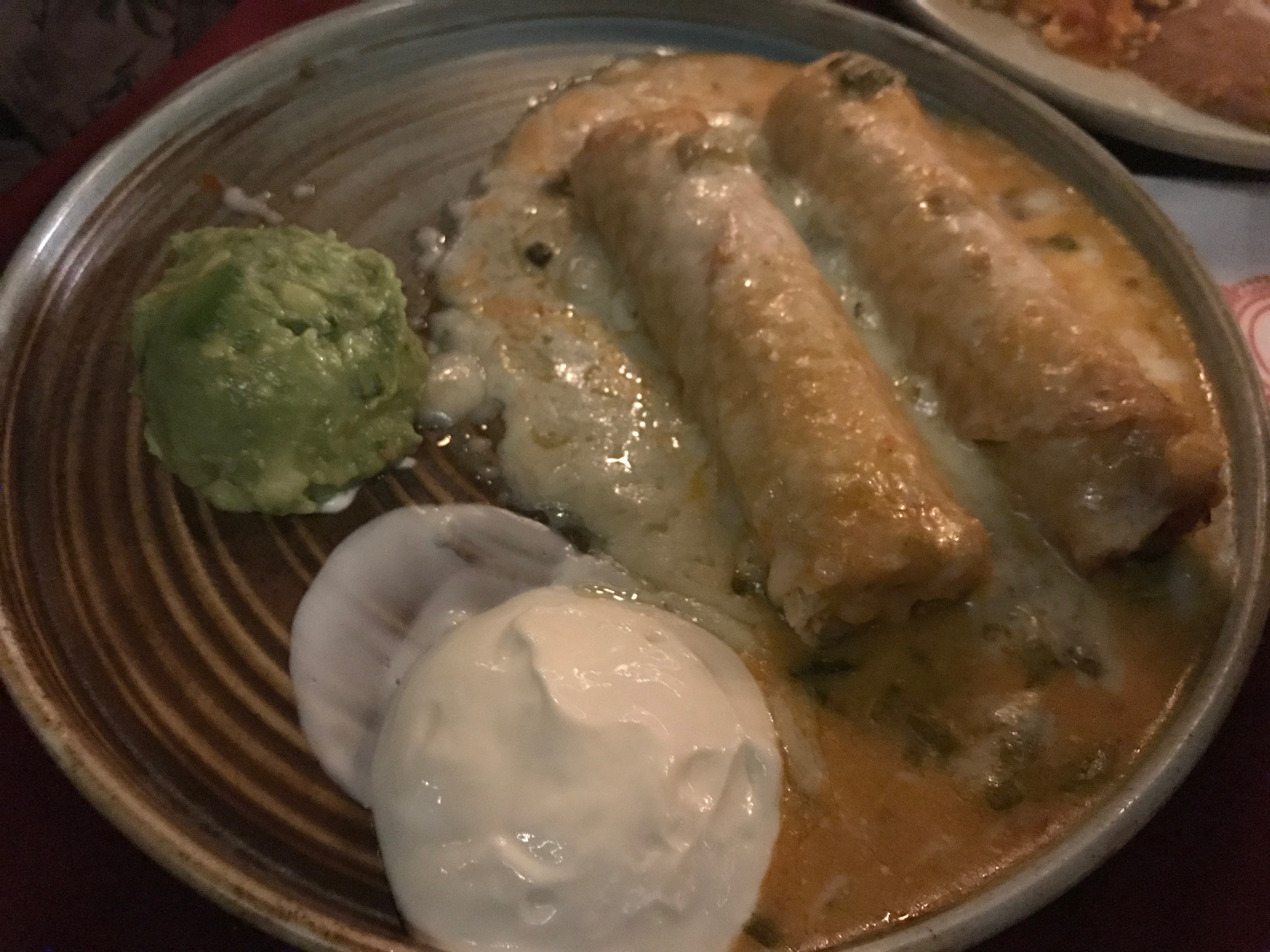
Chicken flautas at Casa Vega.
