= List of awards and nominations received by Afgan =

Afgan Syahreza awards and nominations
Awards and nominations
Award	Wins	Nominations
Anugerah Musik Indonesia	7	27
Anugerah Planet Muzik	5	20
Asia Song Festival	1	1
Dahsyatnya Awards	8	25
Hai Reader's Poll Music Awards	2	3
Inbox Awards	2	7
Indigo Digital Music Awards	2	2
Indosat Awards	1	3
MTV Indonesia Awards	2	3
Nickelodeon Indonesia Kids' Choice Awards	4	10
SCTV Awards	3	9
SCTV Music Awards	9	21
World Music Awards	1	6

Totals (Note: Certain award groups do not simply award one winner. They acknowledge several different recipients, have runners-up, and have third place. Since this is a specific recognition and is different from losing an award, runner-up mentions are considered wins in this award tally. For simplification and to avoid errors, each award in this list has been presumed to have had a prior nomination.)
- Wins: 57
- Nominations: 170

Afgan Syahreza is an Indonesian singer and actor. This is a list of awards received by Afgan.

== 100% Ampuh Awards ==
The 100% Ampuh Awards are an awards ceremony were presented by 100% Ampuh and first established in 2013 on Global TV, to awarded for achievement artist who to be appreciated in music.

Year	Nominee / work	Award	Result	Ref.
2013	Afgan	Best Solo Singer	Nominated	

== Anugerah MeleTOP Era ==
The Anugerah MeleTOP Era (formerly Anugerah Era) are an awards to recognize local celebrities in various platforms, such as music, radio, television, film and digital in Malaysia, based on website voting and SMS. The awards ceremonies presented from 2001 to 2007 during six years of vacuum and held again in 2014.

Year	Nominee / work	Award	Result	Ref.
2014	Afgan	Best Regional Artist	Nominated	

== Anugerah Melodi ==
The Anugerah Melodi (English translation: Melody Awards) was an award ceremony were presented by infotainment Melodi in Malaysia, to recognition to the local and international arts activists are certainly a great impact in the local entertainment center stage. Afgan has received one award.

Year	Nominee / work	Award	Result	Ref.
2016	Afgan	Overseas Personality Melody	Won	

== Anugerah Industri Muzik ==
The Anugerah Industri Muzik (English translation: Music Industry Awards), commonly known by the acronym AIM, are awards to honour the Malaysian music industry, first held in 1993. It is Malaysia's equivalent of the Grammy Awards.

Year	Nominee / work	Award	Result	Ref.
2013	"Pesan Cinta"	Best Malay Song Performance by Foreign Artist	Nominated	

== Anugerah Musik Indonesia ==
The Anugerah Musik Indonesia (English translation: Indonesian Music Awards), is an annual Indonesian major music award. They have been compared to the American Grammy Awards and British Brit Awards. The award was formalized in 1997 by ASIRI (Association of Indonesia Recording Industry), PAPPRI (Association of Indonesian Singers, Songwriters and Music Record Producers), and KCI (Copyright Office of Indonesia). It is the highest music award given to outstanding artists in Indonesia. Afgan has received seven awards from 27 nominations.

Year	Nominee / work	Award	Result	Ref.
2009	Confession No.1	Best Pop Album	Nominated	
2009	"Terima Kasih Cinta"	Best of the Best Newcomer	Nominated	
2009	"Terima Kasih Cinta"	Best Pop Male Solo Artist	Won	
2012	"Panah Asmara"	Best Pop Male Solo Artist	Won	
2012	"Panah Asmara"	Best Pop Song	Won	
2012	"Panah Asmara"	Best Mix Engineer	Won	
2012	"Panah Asmara"	Best Pop Recording Producer	Nominated	
2012	"Panah Asmara"	Best of the Best Production Work	Nominated	
2012	The One	Best Recording Album Producer	Nominated	
2014	"Jodoh Pasti Bertemu"	Best Pop Male Solo Artist	Nominated	
2014	"Jodoh Pasti Bertemu"	Best Pop/Urban Songwriter	Nominated	
2014	"Jodoh Pasti Bertemu"	Best Pop/Urban Recording Producer	Nominated	
2014	"Pesan Cinta"	Best R&B/Soul Production Work	Nominated	
2014	L1ve to Love, Love to L1ve	Best Pop/Urban Album	Nominated	
2014	L1ve to Love, Love to L1ve	Best Recording Album Producer	Nominated	
2014	L1ve to Love, Love to L1ve	Best of the Best Album	Nominated	
2015	"Kumohon"	Best Pop Male Solo Artist	Nominated	
2015	"Kamu Yang Kutunggu" (feat. Rossa)	Best Pop Collaboration	Won	
2015	"Kamu Yang Kutunggu" (feat. Rossa)	Best Collaboration Production Work	Nominated	
2015	"Kamu Yang Kutunggu" (feat. Rossa)	Best of the Best Production Work	Nominated	
2016	"Kunci Hati"	Best Pop Male Solo Artist	Nominated	
2016	"Percayalah" (with Raisa)	Best Pop Collaboration	Won	
2016	"Percayalah" (with Raisa)	Best Collaboration Production Work	Won	
2017	"Jalan Terus"	Best Pop Male Solo Artist	Nominated	
2017	"Ku Dengannya Kau Dengan Dia"	Best Mix Engineer	Nominated	
2017	SIDES	Best of the Best Album	Nominated	
2017	SIDES	Best Pop Album	Nominated	

== Anugerah Planet Muzik ==
The Anugerah Planet Muzik (Malay translation: Planet Music Awards), was an annual music awards were organized by several media companies MediaCorp, Suria, Warna 94.2FM and Ria 89.7FM, to honour for artist in 3 countries (Singapore, Malaysia and Indonesia) who to be outstanding achievement in the regional of Malay and Indonesian music industry. It was first established in 2001. Afgan has received five awards from 20 nominations.

Year	Nominee / work	Award	Result	Ref.
2009	"Terima Kasih Cinta"	Best Vocal Performance in a Song by a New Male Artist	Nominated	
2009	"Terima Kasih Cinta"	Best Song	Nominated	
2009	Confession No.1	Best Album	Won	
2009	Confession No.1	Best Male Artist	Won	
2009	Afgan	Most Popular Indonesian Artist	Nominated	
2009	Afgan	Most Popular Regional Artist	Nominated	
2012	"Panah Asmara"	Best Male Artist	Nominated	
2012	Afgan	Most Popular Regional Artist	Nominated	
2012	Afgan	New Media Icon	Nominated	
2014	Afgan	APM Most Popular Artist	Nominated	
2014	Afgan	Social Media Icon	Nominated	
2014	"Katakan Tidak"	Best Male Artist	Nominated	
2014	"Katakan Tidak"	APM Most Popular Song	Nominated	
2015	"Kamu Yang Kutunggu" (feat. Rossa)	Best Duo/Group	Won	
2015	Afgan	Social Media Icon	Nominated	
2015	Afgan	APM Most Popular Artist	Nominated	
2016	Afgan	Social Media Icon	Nominated	
2016	Afgan	APM Most Popular Artist	Nominated	
2016	"Percayalah" (with Raisa)	Best Duo/Group	Won	
2017	"X" (feat. SonaOne)	Best Collaboration (Artist)	Won	

== Asia Song Festival ==
The Asia Song Festival is an annual pop music festival held in South Korea that features artists from 10 Asian countries. Participating artists receive a plaque of appreciation from the Korean Ministry of Culture, Sports and Tourism and ‘Best Asian Artist Award’ from the chairman of Korea Foundation for International Culture and Exchange. This festival is recorded and broadcast by SBS (Korean freeTV), Fuji TV (Japanese freeTV/BS/CS), and 30 other broadcasters worldwide. Afgan has received one award.

Year	Nominee / work	Award	Result	Ref.
2014	Afgan	Best Asian Artist	Won	

== Bright Awards ==
The Bright Awards are an annual awards were established in 2016, to honored for the artist of Indonesian television advertising. This awards show has teamed up with MNC Media and Unity of Indonesian Advertising Companies. Afgan has received one award.

Year	Nominee / work	Award	Result	Ref.
2017	Afgan	Favorite Male Star Advertisement	Won	

== Dahsyatnya Awards ==
First established in 2009, the Dahsyatnya Awards are an annual awards presented by the daily Indonesian TV show Dahsyat, to honour for musician who to be outstanding in music and entertainment. Afgan has received eight awards from 25 nominations.

Year	Nominee / work	Award	Result	Ref.
2009	Afgan	Outstanding Solo Singer	Nominated	
2010	Afgan	Outstanding Solo Singer	Won	
2011	Afgan	Outstanding Solo Singer	Won	
2011	"Bawalah Cintaku"	Outstanding Video Clip	Nominated	
2011	"Bawalah Cintaku"	Outstanding Director Video Clip	Nominated	
2012	"Panah Asmara"	Outstanding Song	Nominated	
2012	Afgan	Outstanding Male Solo Singer	Nominated	
2013	Afgan	Outstanding Male Solo Singer	Won	
2014	Afgan	Outstanding Male Solo Singer	Won	
2014	"Jodoh Pasti Bertemu"	Outstanding Song	Nominated	
2015	"Katakan Tidak"	Outstanding Song	Nominated	
2015	"Kumohon"	Outstanding Video Clip	Nominated	
2015	"Kumohon"	Outstanding Director Video Clip	Nominated	
2015	Afgan	Outstanding Male Solo Singer	Won	
2016	Afgan	Outstanding Male Solo Singer	Nominated	
2016	"Knock Me Out"	Outstanding Song	Nominated	
2016	"Kamulah Yang Kutunggu" (feat. Rossa)	Outstanding Song	Nominated	
2016	Afgan & Rossa	Outstanding Duet/Collaboration	Nominated	
2016	Afgan & Raisa	Outstanding Duet/Collaboration	Won	
2017	"Kunci Hati"	Outstanding Song	Won	
2017	"Jalan Terus"	Outstanding Model Video Clip (with Lutesha)	Nominated	
2017	Afgan	Outstanding Male Solo Singer	Won	
2018	Afgan	Outstanding Male Solo Singer	Nominated	
2018	"X" (feat. SonaOne)	Outstanding Duo/Collaboration	Nominated	
2018	"Ku Dengannya Kau Dengan Dia"	Outstanding Video Clip	Nominated	

== Global Seru Awards ==
The Global Seru Awards are awarded to celebrities who have caught the attention of the public through interesting or exciting accomplishments.

Year	Nominee / work	Award	Result	Ref.
2014	"Jodoh Pasti Bertemu"	Most Exciting Song	Nominated	

== Grazia Glitz & Glam Awards ==
The Grazia Glitz & Glam Awards are an off-air awards ceremony were presented by magazine Grazia Indonesia, to honour for celebrity in fashion and entertainment. Afgan has received one award.

Year	Nominee / work	Award	Result	Ref.
2013	"Jodoh Pasti Bertemu"	Song of the Year	Won	

== Hai Reader's Poll Music Awards ==
Created by Indonesian magazine Hai, the Hai Reader's Poll Music Awards are an awards to honour for talent in music, based on online voting. Afgan has received two awards from 3 nominations.

Year	Nominee / work	Award	Result	Ref.
2012	Afgan	The Best Male	Won	
2013	Afgan	The Best Male	Won	
2015	Konser Dari Hati	The Best Concert	Nominated	

== Inbox Awards ==
The Inbox Awards are an awards ceremony were presented by Indonesian TV program Inbox and SCTV for appreciated for talent in music and entertainment. It is first launched in 2008. Afgan has received two awards from 7 nominations.

Year	Nominee / work	Award	Result	Ref.
2010	"Cinta 2 Hati" (with Olivia Jensen)	Most Exciting Couple in Video Clip	Nominated	
2011	Afgan	Most Inbox Solo Singer	Nominated	
2012	Afgan	Most Inbox Male Solo Singer	Won	
2013	Afgan	Most Inbox Male Solo Singer	Won	
2014	Afgan	Most Inbox Male Solo Singer	Nominated	
2015	Afgan	Most Inbox Male Solo Singer	Nominated	
2016	Afgan	Most Inbox Male Solo Singer	Nominated	

== Indigo Awards ==
The Indigo Awards are an annual award were presented by PT. Telekomunikasi Indonesia (Telkom) in 2009, to honour for artist, who have their song used most as ringback tones in all categories of creative industries and provide benefits for society, the environment, and create new business opportunities. Afgan has received two awards.

Year	Nominee / work	Award	Result	Ref.
2010	Afgan	Best Male Artist	Won	
2011	Afgan	Best Male Artist	Won	

== Indonesian Box Office Movie Awards ==
Presented by SCTV since 2016, the Indonesian Box Office Movie Awards (shortly IBOMA) are an awards ceremony were honored for 10 films which regarded as the best-selling movie and earned a lot of viewers when aired in theaters.

Year	Nominee / work	Award	Result	Ref.
2017	"Percayalah" (for London Love Story)	Best Original Soundtrack	Nominated	

== Indonesian Choice Awards ==
The Indonesian Choice Awards are an annual awards ceremony were established on 2014 by Indonesian television station, NET., to honour for talent artists whose had recognize for quality in music and entertainment.

Year	Nominee / work	Award	Result	Ref.
2014	Afgan	Male Singer of the Year	Nominated	
2014	L1ve to Love, Love to L1ve	Album of the Year	Nominated	
2016	"Percayalah" (with Raisa)	Song of the Year	Nominated	

== Indonesian Movie Awards ==
First established in 2007, the Indonesian Movie Awards (now Indonesian Movie Actor Awards) are an annual awards ceremony have presenting to filmmakers.

Year	Nominee / work	Award	Result	Ref.
2010	"Bukan Cinta Biasa" (for film Bukan Cinta Biasa)	Favorite Soundtrack	Nominated	
2011	"Dalam Mihrab Cinta" (for film Dalam Mihrab Cinta)	Favorite Soundtrack	Nominated	
2014	"Jodoh Pasti Bertemu" (for film Madre)	Favorite Soundtrack	Nominated	

== Indonesian Social Media Awards ==
The Indonesian Social Media Awards are an annual awards were established in 2016 by SCTV to appreciated for celebrity in social media.

Year	Nominee / work	Award	Result	Ref.
2016	Afgan	Male Celeb Facebook	Nominated	
2016	Afgan	Male Celeb Twitter	Nominated	

== Indonesian Television Awards ==
First established in 2016, the Indonesian Television Awards are awarded to honour a talented artist in entertainment and program television. Its awards show was based on social media voting, such as Twitter and Facebook.

Year	Nominee / work	Award	Result	Ref.
2016	Afgan	Most Popular Singer	Nominated	

== Indosat Awards ==
The Indosat Awards are music awards presented by telecommunications provider Indosat, first presented in 2011. The awards are based on the popularity of a singer, as derived from sales, stage appearances, and radio chart positions. Afgan has received one award from 3 nominations.

Year	Nominee / work	Award	Result	Ref.
2011	Afgan	Most Popular Male Pop Singer	Won	
2011	"Cinta Dua Hati"	Most Popular Pop Song	Nominated	
2011	The One	Most Popular Album	Nominated	

== Infotainment Awards ==
Introduced in 2012, the Infotainment Awards are an awards ceremony were presented by SCTV for celebrities who had become hottest and with achievement in entertainment.

Year	Nominee / work	Award	Result	Ref.
2014	Afgan	Most Fashionable Male Celebrity	Nominated	

== Insert Fashion Awards ==
First established in 2015, the Insert Fashion Awards are an awards ceremony have presenting to fashion designer and celebrity who had to be fashionable. Afgan has received one award.

Year	Nominee / work	Award	Result	Ref.
2017	Afgan	Top 3 Fashionable Male	Won	

== Mom & Kids Awards ==
First launched in 2015 by MNC Group, the Mom & Kids Awards are awarded to talent artist who became as inspiration of mother and kids.

Year	Nominee / work	Award	Result	Ref.
2015	Afgan	Favorite Male Singer	Nominated	
2016	Afgan	Favorite Idol Singer	Nominated	

== JawaPos.com Readers Choice Awards ==
The JawaPos.com Readers Choice Awards was an online award first established in 2017 by newspaper Jawa Pos, to honour a public figure in music, film and entertainment.

Year	Nominee / work	Award	Result	Ref.
2017	Afgan	Favorite Male Singer	Nominated	

== MTV Awards ==
=== MTV Ampuh ===
Year	Nominee / work	Award	Result	Ref.
2008	Afgan	Male Artist of the Year	Won	
2010	Afgan	Male Artist of the Year	Won	

=== MTV Indonesia Awards ===
The MTV Indonesia Awards are an annual awards presented by MTV Indonesia, as chosen by their viewers throughout Indonesia. Afgan received two awards from 3 nominations.

Year	Nominee / work	Award	Result	Ref.
2008	"Sadis"	Most Favorite Male Artist	Won	
2008	"Sadis"	Best Artist of the Year	Won	
2009	"Wajahmu Mengalirkan Duniaku"	Most Favorite Male Artist	Nominated	

== Nickelodeon Indonesia Kids' Choice Awards ==
The Nickelodeon Indonesia Kids' Choice Awards is Indonesian version of Nickelodeon Kids' Choice Awards, held since 2008 in Jakarta. Afgan received four awards from 10 nominations.

Year	Nominee / work	Award	Result	Ref.
2008	Afgan	Favorite Male Singer	Won	
2008	Afgan	Indonesian Star Wannabe Award	Nominated	
2009	Afgan	Favorite Male Singer	Won	
2009	Afgan	Indonesian Star Wannabe Award	Won	
2010	Afgan	Favorite Male Singer	Won	
2011	Afgan	Favorite Male Singer	Nominated	
2012	Afgan	Favorite Singer	Nominated	
2014	Afgan	Favorite Singer	Nominated	
2015	Afgan	Favorite Singer	Nominated	
2017	Afgan	Favorite Singer	Nominated	

== Opera Van Java Awards ==
The OVJ Awards are an awards ceremony were presented by comedy program Opera Van Java and first established in 2011, to awarded for the main artist who has appeared as original cast and guest star.

Year	Nominee / work	Award	Result	Ref.
2013	Afgan	Most Tempted Artist	Nominated	

== Oz Radio Bandung FM Awards ==
The Oz Radio Bandung FM Awards are an online radio awards were presented by OZ Radio FM, for talent musician/singer who have listed of 'friendly' in music. Afgan has received one award.

Year	Nominee / work	Award	Result	Ref.
2017	Afgan	Most Friendly Male Singer	Won	
2018	Afgan	Most Friendly Male Singer	Pending	

== SCTV Awards ==
First established in 2001, the SCTV Awards are an annual awards ceremony were presented by the Indonesian TV station SCTV, to honour for artists who became popular (Indonesian: Ngetop) in various programs. It is based on the audience's votes. Afgan has received three awards from 9 nominations.

Year	Nominee / work	Award	Result	Ref.
2008	Afgan	Famous Singer	Nominated	
2009	Afgan	Famous Singer	Won	
2010	Afgan	Famous Singer	Won	
2011	Afgan	Famous Singer	Nominated	
2012	Afgan	Famous Singer	Nominated	
2013	Afgan	Famous Singer	Nominated	
2014	Afgan	Famous Singer	Nominated	
2016	Afgan	Famous Singer	Won	
2017	Afgan	Famous Singer	Nominated	

== SCTV Music Awards ==
The SCTV Music Awards are a music awards ceremony were presented by Indonesian TV station, SCTV, to honour for artists who had to be popular (Indonesian: Paling Ngetop) in various songs and selling albums. It is based on the audience's vote. Afgan has received nine awards from 21 nominations.

Year	Nominee / work	Award	Result	Ref.
2009	Confession No.1	Famous Solo Pop Album	Won	
2009	Confession No.1	Famous Newcomer Album	Nominated	
2009	"Terima Kasih Cinta"	Most Famous Song	Nominated	
2010	Bukan Cinta Biasa (single)	Famous Male Solo Album	Won	
2011	The One	Famous Solo Pop Album	Won	
2011	"Bawalah Cintaku"	Most Famous Song	Nominated	
2012	Kembali (single)	Famous Male Solo Album	Won	
2013	Afgan	Most Famous Male Solo Singer	Won	
2014	Afgan	Most Famous Male Solo Singer	Won	
2014	"Jodoh Pasti Berlalu"	Most Famous Pop Song	Nominated	
2015	Afgan	Most Famous Male Solo Singer	Won	
2016	Afgan	Most Famous Male Solo Singer	Nominated	
2016	"Percayalah" (with Raisa)	Most Famous Video Clip	Nominated	
2016	"Percayalah" (with Raisa)	Most Famous Pop Song	Nominated	
2016	"Percayalah" (with Raisa)	Most Famous Collaboration	Won	
2017	"Kamulah Yang Kutunggu" (with Rossa)	Most Famous Collaboration	Nominated	
2017	"Jalan Terus"	Most Famous Video Clip	Nominated	
2017	Afgan	Most Famous Male Solo Singer	Won	
2018	Afgan	Most Famous Male Solo Singer	Pending	
2018	"Heaven" (feat. Isyana Sarasvati & Rendy Pandugo)	Most Famous Collaboration	Pending	
2018	"Ku Dengannya Kau Dengan Dia"	Most Famous Video Clip	Pending	

== Seleb On News Awards ==
The Seleb On News Awards are awarding to honour for celebrities which to be important part from infotainment Seleb On News. It is a first launched in 2016.

Year	Nominee / work	Award	Result	Ref.
2016	Afgan	Most Quietest Celeb	Nominated	

== Selebrita Awards ==
The Selebrita Awards are an awards ceremony were presented by infotainment program Selebrita on 2013, which recognize to artist in entertainment; and also voted by fans in website poll.

Year	Nominee / work	Award	Result	Ref.
2015	"Knock Me Out"	Most Celeb Song	Nominated	
2016	"Percayalah" (with Raisa)	Most Celeb Song	Nominated	

== Socmed Awards ==
The Socmed Awards are an awards for celebrities and public figures who dominated the popularity of various social media platforms, such as Instagram, YouTube, Blogs and Twitter.

Year	Nominee / work	Award	Result	Ref.
2016	Afgan	Celeb Twit Male	Nominated	

== World Music Awards ==
The World Music Awards is an international awards show founded in 1989 under the patronage of Albert II, Prince of Monaco and based in Monte Carlo. Awards are presented to the world's best selling artist in various categories and to the best-selling artist from each major territory. Sales figures are provided by the International Federation of the Phonographic Industry. Afgan has received one award from 6 nominations.

Year	Nominee / work	Award	Result	Ref.
2014	"Jodoh Pasti Bertemu"	World's Best Song	Nominated	
2014	"Jodoh Pasti Bertemu"	World's Best Video	Nominated	
2014	Afgan	World's Best Male Artist	Nominated	
2014	Afgan	World's Best Live Act	Nominated	
2014	Afgan	World's Best Entertainer of the Year	Nominated	
2014	Afgan	World's Best Indonesian Male Artist (Voted)	Won	

== Yahoo! Celebrity Awards ==
First established in 2012 (as Yahoo! OMG Awards) by Yahoo! Indonesia, the Yahoo! Celebrity Awards are an awards were giving to celebrity in film, music, radio and television, based on online voting in website.

Year	Nominee / work	Award	Result	Ref.
2014	Afgan	Most Stylist Male	Nominated	

== Accolades from organizations ==
=== Anugerah Kekayaan Intelektual Nasional ===
Year	Nominee / work	Award	Result	Ref.
2014	Afgan	Singer	Recipient	
2015	Afgan	Medal for Creativity	Recipient	

=== National Outstanding Youth Pioneer ===
Year	Nominee / work	Award	Result	Ref.
2014	Afgan	Field of Arts and Culture	Recipient	
