= 2023 in Asian music =

== Events ==
- January 27 – MLD Entertainment announce that South Korean girl band Momoland has left the label and the members' contracts have expired.
- January 22 – Tan Dun conducts the UK premiere of his work Buddha Passion at the Royal Festival Hall in London's Southbank Centre
- February 1 – Hong Kong Sinfonietta announces that German conductor Christoph Poppen will become its new music director for the 2023-2024 season.
- February 5 – At the 65th Annual Grammy Awards, Chinese-born conductor Xian Zhang is co-recipient of two classical awards: Best Classical Instrumental Solo, for Time for Three's album Letters for the Future and Best Contemporary Classical Composition as conductor of Kevin Puts' Contact
- February 7 – The first season of Coke Studio Bharat appears on MTV India.
- February 15–October 30 – The Rui Shi Music Festival is held in Beijing, China.
- April – South Korean pianist Seong-Jin Cho wins the Ho-Am Prize in the Arts.
- April 29 – The Naon no Yaon Music Festival is held in Hibiya Park, Tokyo, Japan, with the customary all-female line-up, including Show-Ya, Chiaki and Rika Matsumoto
- May 26–28 – The Seoul Jazz Festival takes place in South Korea.
- June 30 – Viva Records takes over Ivory Music and Video, former distributors of Sony Music Entertainment in the Philippines.
- August 17 – Leaked audio clips from the show Sing! China are made public, supporting claims by the late Coco Lee about her treatment the production team during the recording of the show's final episode in October 2022.
- October 2 – The Sapporo Symphony Orchestra announces that Elias Grandy will take over as its chief conductor in April 2025.

== Albums ==
- Babymetal – The Other One (March 24)
- Hiroyuki Sawano – V (January)
- Rossa – Another Journey : The Beginning (February 6)
- 8Turn – 8Turnrise (EP; February 6)
- Joyce Cheng – Believe Us (March 16)
- MC Cheung Tin-fu – This is MC (March 15)
- Kayhan Kalhor & Toumani Diabate – The Sky is the Same colour Everywhere (May 5)
- Flyin Up – Jimlik (June 6)

== Classical works ==
- Ke-Chia Chen – Ebbs and Flows
- Amir ElSaffar – Dhikra
- Noriko Koide – Güiro Güiro
- Lei Liang – Silk and Bamboo Concerto
- Akira Nishimura – Triple Concerto (“Dream of Butterfly”)
- Tan Dun – Requiem for Nature

== Musical films ==
- Almost Pyaar with DJ Mohabbat (India), with score and songs by Amit Trivedi and lyrics by Shellee.
- Ballerina (South Korea), with music by Gray
- Gekijо̄ban Idolish7 LIVE 4bit BEYOND THE PERiOD (Japan), concert film based on the Idolish7 series.
- Kahit Maputi Na Ang Buhok Ko (Philippines), biographical film about the life of Rey Valera.
- Maayakumari (India), with music by Bickram Ghosh
- Naam Katra Isai (Malaysia - Tamil), with original score by Boy Radge
- Priyotoma (Bangladesh), with soundtrack by Akassh, Prince Mahmud, and Sajid Sarker.
- Prohelika (Bangladesh), with music by Emon Saha and songs by Kishore Das and Asif Iqbal.
- Surga di Bawah Langit (Indonesia), with music by Elwin Hendrijanto

== Deaths ==
- January 3 – Joseph Koo ("Moran"), 92, Hong Kong composer
- January 4 – Beeyar Prasad, 61, Indian Malayalam lyricist (complications of stroke)
- January 11 – Yukihiro Takahashi, 70, Japanese musician best known as a drummer and vocalist
- February 16 – Maon Kurosaki, 35, Japanese pop singer
- February 4 – Vani Jairam, 77, Indian playback singer
- February 14 – Tohru Okada, 73, musician and creator of the PlayStation sound effect
- February 23 – Junnosuke Kuroda, 34, Japanese rock musician
- March 1 – Neela Ramgopal, 87, Indian Carnatic vocalist and teacher
- April 4 – Rockstar Ramani Ammal, Indian playback singer, 69
- April 19 – Moonbin, South Korean singer, 25
- April 20 – Pamela Chopra, Indian playback singer, 75
- May 4 – Karaikudi Mani, Indian mridangam player, 77
- June 7 – Banani Ghosh, Indian Rabindra Sangeet singer, age unknown
- June 18 – Nasrollah Nasehpour, Iranian-Azerbaijani radif player, 82
- June 25 – Tapas Das (Bapida), Indian rock singer, songwriter and guitarist, 68
- July 3 – Sudakshina Sarma, Indian Assamese language singer and musician, 88
- July 4 – Robin Tamang, Nepalese singer and actor, 60
- July 5 – Coco Lee, Chinese-American singer and songwriter, 48
- July 11 – Yuzo Toyama, Japanese composer, 92
- July 15 – Chen Mao-shuen, Taiwanese composer, 87
- July 21 – Mahabhashyam Chittaranjan, Indian author, Telugu musician and composer, 84
- August 12 – Vilayil Faseela, Indian singer of Mappila songs, 63
- September 4 – Sherali Joʻrayev, Uzbek singer, songwriter, poet and actor, 76
- September 6 – Malini Rajurkar, Indian Hindustani classical singer, 82
- September 7 – Akira Nishimura, Japanese composer, 69 (cancer)
- September 13 – Manik Bhide, Indian Hindustani classical singer, 88
- September 17 – Lies Adji Rachman, Indonesian pop musician, 78
- October 6 – Nadira Begum, Bangladeshi folk singer, age unknown
- October 27 – Swarup Nayak, Indian music director, composer, and actor, 76
- October 29 – Heath (Hiroshi Morie), Japanese bass guitarist, singer and songwriter, 55
- November 1 – Leela Omchery, Indian classical singer and musicologist, 94
- November 15 – P. K. Narayanan Nambiar, Indian Mizhavu musician, 96
- November 28
  - Queenzy Cheng, Malaysian actress and singer, 37 (brain aneurysm)
  - Dedema, Chinese singer, 76
- November 30 – Subbalakshmi, Indian Carnatic musician, composer and actress, 87
- December 30 – Pandit Bhavani Shankar, Indian pakhawaj drum player

== By country ==
- 2023 in Chinese music
- 2023 in Japanese music
- 2023 in Philippine music
- 2023 in South Korean music

== See also ==
- 2023 in music
