= Nada-Nada Cinta =

Studio album by Rossa
- Released: 27 January 1996
- Recorded: 1993–1995
- Studio: Studio Jelambar
- Genre: Pop
- Label: Pro Sound / Trinity Optima Production
- Producer: Adi Nugroho

Rossa chronology
Gadis Ingusan (1988)	Nada-Nada Cinta (1999)	Tegar (1999)

Nada-Nada Cinta is a 1996 album by the Indonesian singer Rossa.

== History ==
Nada-Nada Cinta is Rossa’s first studio album released as an adult artist, issued on 27 January 1996. The album marked her breakthrough in the Indonesian music industry and established her as a prominent pop singer. Its lead single, “Nada-Nada Cinta,” was followed by “Sebening Embun di Hatiku.”

Despite balancing her music career with her studies at the time, the album achieved strong commercial success, selling over 750,000 copies in Indonesia. The title track peaked at number two on the all-time MTV Ampuh Indonesia chart and remained at number one for 18 consecutive weeks. During this period, Rossa also appeared in the television series Dua Sisi Mata Uang.

In 2024, Rossa recorded a reworked version of “Nada-Nada Cinta” in collaboration with Ariel of Noah for the documentary film All Access to Rossa 25 Shining Years. The reinterpretation revisited the song that marked her breakthrough in the mid-1990s, presenting it in a contemporary arrangement while retaining its original melodic structure.

The collaboration highlighted Rossa's continued relevance across generations and connected her early career with her later work, as documented in the film, which chronicles her 25-year journey in the Indonesian music industry. The updated version of “Nada-Nada Cinta” was featured as part of the documentary's soundtrack and received attention for bringing together two prominent figures from different eras of Indonesian popular music.

== Track listing ==
1. Nada-Nada Cinta (Younky Soewarno & Maryati)
2. Sebening Embun di Hatiku (Younky Soewarno & Tommy Marie)
3. Kau dan Aku Satu (JJ Zukriansyah & Tommy A.)
4. Cemburu (Joko Esha)
5. Takkan Pernah (Erns F. Mangalo)
6. Jangan (Cecep AS)
7. Cinta (Rummy Azis)
8. Mimpi Sedih (A. Riyanto)
