= A New Chapter =

A New Chapter may refer to:

- A New Chapter (Anthony Callea album), 2006
- A New Chapter (Rossa album), 2017

== See also ==
- New Chapter, an American manufacturer of vitamins and other dietary supplements
- "A New Chapter Begins", an episode of the 2018 Indian TV series Karenjit Kaur – The Untold Story of Sunny Leone
