= 2023 in Asia =

This is a list of events that took place in Asia in 2023.

== Incumbents ==
=== Afghanistan ===
(Afghanistan)

=== Armenia ===
(Armenia)

=== Azerbaijan ===
(Azerbaijan)

=== Bahrain ===
(Bahrain)

=== Bangladesh ===
(Bangladesh)

=== Bhutan ===
(Bhutan)

=== Brunei ===
(Brunei)

=== Cambodia ===
(Cambodia)

=== China ===
(China)

=== Cyprus ===
(Cyprus)

=== Georgia ===
(Georgia (country))

=== India ===
(India)

=== Indonesia ===
(Indonesia)

=== Iran ===
(Iran)

=== Iraq ===
(Iraq)

=== Israel ===
(Israel)

=== Japan ===
(Japan)

=== Jordan ===
(Jordan)

=== Kazakhstan ===
(Kazakhstan)

=== Kuwait ===
(Kuwait)

=== Kyrgyzstan ===
(Kyrgyzstan)

=== Laos ===
(Laos)

=== Lebanon ===
(Lebanon)

=== Malaysia ===
(Malaysia)

=== Maldives ===
(Maldives)

=== Mongolia ===
(Mongolia)

=== Myanmar ===
(Myanmar)

=== Nepal ===
(Nepal)

=== North Korea ===
(North Korea)

=== Oman ===
(Oman)

=== Pakistan ===
(Pakistan)

=== Palestine ===
(Palestine)

=== Philippines ===
(Philippines)

=== Qatar ===
(Qatar)

=== Russia ===
(Russia)

=== Saudi Arabia ===
(Saudi Arabia)

=== Singapore ===
(Singapore)

=== South Korea ===
(South Korea)

=== Sri Lanka ===
(Sri Lanka)

=== Syria ===
(Syria)

=== Taiwan ===
(Taiwan)

=== Tajikistan ===
(Tajikistan)

=== Thailand ===
(Thailand)

=== Timor-Leste ===
(Timor-Leste)

=== Turkey ===
(Turkey)

=== Turkmenistan ===
(Turkmenistan)

=== United Arab Emirates ===
(United Arab Emirates)

=== Uzbekistan ===
(Uzbekistan)

=== Vietnam ===
(Vietnam)

=== Yemen ===
(Yemen)

== Events ==
=== January ===
- 13 January - 29 January - 2023 Men's FIH Hockey World Cup

=== February ===
- 13 February - 2023 Bangladeshi presidential election

=== March ===
- 2 March - 2023 Vietnamese presidential election
- 9 March - 2023 Nepalese presidential election
- 19 March - 2023 Kazakh legislative election
- 26 March - 2023 Turkmen parliamentary election

=== May ===
- 5 May – A penumbral lunar eclipse was visible in the evening and the following morning in Africa, Asia and Australia and was the 24th lunar eclipse of Lunar Saros 141.
- 14 May – 2023 Thai general election
- 14 May – 2023 Turkish parliamentary election
- 21 May – 2023 East Timorese parliamentary election

=== June ===
- 6 June – 2023 Kuwaiti general election
- 16 June – 16 July 16 – 2023 AFC Asian Cup.

=== July ===
- 6 July – The 2023 Hong Kong electoral changes confirmed and approved by Legislative Council. Direct elected seats of district councilors decreased from 452 out of 479 (94%) to 88 out of 470 (19%), and will establish the District Council Eligibility Review Committee for review the eligibility of every District Council Candidates.
- 9 July – 2023 Uzbek presidential election
- 23 July – 2023 Cambodian general election

=== September ===
- 1 September – 2023 Singaporean presidential election
- 9 September – 2023 Maldivian presidential election
- 10 September – 2023 Russian elections
- 19 September – Azerbaijan launched a military offensive against the Armenia-backed Republic of Artsakh.
- September 20 – Armenian separatist forces in Nagorno-Karabakh surrender and agree to a Russian proposal for a ceasefire with Azerbaijan effective from 1 pm on Wednesday.
- 23 September – 8 October – 2022 Asian Games in Hangzhou, Zhejiang, China.
- 24 September – 4 October – over 100,000 ethnic Armenians flee Nagorno-Karabakh.
- 28 September – Samvel Shahramanyan, president of the breakaway Republic of Artsakh, signs a decree to dissolve all state institutions of Artsakh beginning at the start of 2024.

=== October ===
- 5 October – 26 November – 2023 Cricket World Cup in India.
- 7 October – 2023 Emirati parliamentary election
- 28 October – A partial lunar eclipse was visible in the evening and the next morning over Europe and most of Africa and Asia and was the 11th lunar eclipse of Lunar Saros 146.
- 29 October – 2023 Omani general election

== See also ==
- 2023 in Asian music
- List of state leaders in 2023 § Asia
