= The Best of Rossa =

Compilation album by Rossa
- Released: 30 November 2011
- Recorded: 1999–2011
- Genre: Pop, R&B, dance-pop
- Length: 52:50
- Label: Trinity Optima Production (Indonesia); Suria Records (Malaysia)
- Producer: Rossa. Yonathan Nugroho

Rossa chronology
Harmoni Jalinan Nada & Cerita (2010)	The Best of Rossa (2011)	Platinum Collection (2013)

Singles from The Best of Rossa
- 1. "Jangan Ada Dusta Diantara Kita" Released: December 2011; 2. "One Night Lover (ft. Joe Flizzow)" Released: May 2012; 3. "Tak Sanggup Lagi" Released: July 2012

The Best of Rossa is a greatest hits album by Indonesian pop singer Rossa, released on 30 November 2011 by Trinity Optima Production. The album compiles eleven tracks selected from seven of her previous studio albums, alongside three newly recorded songs: “Jangan Ada Dusta Diantara Kita,” “Tak Sanggup Lagi,” and “One Night Lover.”

As part of its distribution strategy, the album was marketed through a collaboration between Rossa, her record label, and the fast-food chain KFC, and was made available at KFC outlets across Indonesia. The approach was adopted amid widespread concerns over music piracy in the Indonesian market. According to reported sales figures, The Best of Rossa sold more than 5 million copies nationwide, placing it among the best-selling albums in Indonesian music history.

== Track listing ==
No.	Title	Writer(s)	Length
1.	"Jangan Ada Dusta Diantara Kita" (featuring Broery)	Harry Tasman	4:22
2.	"Tak Sanggup Lagi"	Aji Mirza Hakim	4:09
3.	"Ku Menunggu"	Mery LC	3:49
4.	"Terlanjur Cinta" (featuring Pasha)	Yoyo Prasetyo	4:25
5.	"Pudar"	Hendra Nurcahya	3:09
6.	"Aku Bukan Untukmu"	Aji Mirza Hakim	3:59
7.	"Malam Pertama"	Melly Goeslaw	3:34
8.	"Ayat-Ayat Cinta"	Melly Goeslaw	3:46
9.	"Sakura"	Fariz RM & Jimmy Fals	3:40
10.	"Hati Yang Kau Sakiti"	Enda Ungu	4:04
11.	"Tegar"	Melly Goeslaw	3:39
12.	"Kini"	Yovie Widianto	3:07
13.	"Atas Nama Cinta"	Melly Goeslaw	4:00
14.	"One Night Lover" (featuring Joe Flizzow)	Joe Flizzow & Muzique	4:00
Total length:			52:50
