= Hati Yang Terpilih =

Studio album by Rossa
- Released: 20 August 2000
- Recorded: 2000
- Studio: Pro-Sound & Musica
- Genre: Pop
- Label: Pro-Sound / Trinity Optima Production
- Producer: Adi Nugroho & Handi Santoso

Rossa chronology
Tegar (1999)	Hati Yang Terpilih (2002)	Kini (2002)

Hati Yang Terpilih is the first soundtrack album by Indonesian singer Rossa, released on 20 August 2000. The album was produced for the television series of the same name, which aired on RCTI. It contains one newly recorded song, “Hati Yang Terpilih,” written by Melly Goeslaw, while the remaining tracks were drawn from Rossa’s earlier studio albums Nada-Nada Cinta (1996) and Tegar (1999).

The title track has been used as background music in several Indonesian television series, including Hati Yang Terpilih, produced by Multivision Plus; Cinta Suci, which premiered on 17 September 2018 and was produced by SinemArt; and Dia Yang Kau Pilih, which aired on SCTV from 16 October 2023, where it served as the second opening theme beginning with episode 8.

== Track listing ==
1. Hati Yang Terpilih (Melly Goeslaw)
2. Nada-Nada Cinta (Younky Soewarno / Maryati)
3. Biarkan Tetap Ada (Angga Widodo)
4. Jangan (Cecep A.S.)
5. Sebening Embun Di Hatiku (Younky Soewarno)
6. Biarkan Cinta Itu Ada (Dian PP.)
7. Cemburu (Joko Esha)
8. Ku Kenang (Ricky Cahyadi)
9. Kau Dan Aku Satu (JJ. Zukriansyah / Tommy A.)
10. Hati Yang Terpilih (Bonus Track)
