= Kembali (Rossa album) =

Studio album by Rossa
- Released: 24 December 2004
- Genre: Progressive pop
- Label: Pro-Sound / Trinity Optima Production
- Producer: Rossa . Adi Nugroho

Rossa chronology
Kini (Repackaged Edition) (2003)	Kembali (2004)	Yang Terpilih (2006)

Kembali is a 2004 album by the Indonesian singer Rossa.

== History ==
On 24 December 2004, Rossa released her studio album Kembali, which incorporated elements of progressive pop. Prior to its official release, two songs from the album had already been used as soundtracks for Indonesian television series. “Pudar” was featured as the theme song for Do’iku Beken, produced by Multivision Plus for RCTI, while “Bicara Pada Bintang” was used for Pura-Pura Buta, produced by Soraya Intercine Films for Indosiar.

The album involved collaborations with a range of musicians and arrangers, including Yoyo of Padi, who contributed to the arrangement of “Wanita Yang Kau Pilih,” written by Dino. Other contributors included Icha of Jikustik, Lucky of Element, as well as senior musicians such as Tohpati, Melly Goeslaw, and Anto Hoed. Among the album’s tracks, “Aku Bukan Untukmu” emerged as one of its most prominent singles.

Kembali achieved commercial success in Indonesia and was later released in Malaysia on 23 May 2005, accompanied by a promotional performance at Planet Hollywood Malaysia. The album reportedly sold more than 2,9 Million copies in Indonesia and earned Rossa the Best Progressive Pop Female Singer award at the 2005 Anugerah Musik Indonesia.

== Track listing ==
1. Kembali (Melly Goeslaw)
2. Aku Bukan Untukmu (Aji Mirza Hakim)
3. Bicara Pada Bintang (Melly Goeslaw)
4. Pudar (‘Nda)
5. Cintai Aku (Lucky Element)
6. Akankah Bisa (Tohpati)
7. Biar (Ricky FM)
8. Pujaan Hati (Tohpati)
9. Wanita Yang Kau Pilih (Aldino Amirta Purwaji “Shakey”)
10. Pudar – Soundtrack Version (‘Nda)
