= Yang Terpilih =

Studio album by Rossa
- Released: 26 December 2006
- Genre: Pop; Latin; dance
- Label: Pro Sound / Trinity Optima Production
- Producer: Rossa; Yonathan Nugroho

Rossa chronology
Kembali (2004)	Yang Terpilih (2006)	Rossa (2009)

Yang Terpilih is a 2006 album by the Indonesian singer Rossa.

== History ==
After being nominated as one of Indonesia's representatives at the 2006 MTV Asia Awards in Bangkok, Rossa released her studio album Yang Terpilih on 26 December 2006 through Trinity Optima Production. The album continued her collaboration with the label and featured pop ballads consistent with her musical direction during the mid-2000s.

The album's lead single, "Terlalu Cinta", won an award at the 15th Anugerah Industri Muzik in Malaysia. Additional singles included "Atas Nama Cinta", which was used as the theme song for the television series Cinta Fitri, and "Tak Termiliki", both of which supported the album's promotion across regional music and television platforms.

Yang Terpilih earned multi-platinum certification in Indonesia and was one of Rossa's best-selling releases of the decade. The album's regional reception further strengthened her popularity in neighboring Southeast Asian markets, including Malaysia and Singapore.

== Track listing ==
1. Terlalu Cinta
2. Atas Nama Cinta
3. Tak Termiliki
4. Pudar
5. Perawan Cinta
6. Aku Bukan Untukmu
7. Sakura
8. Kini
9. Wanita Yang Kau Pilih
10. Malam Pertama
11. Tegar
12. Hati Yang Terpilih
13. Bila Salah
14. Nada-Nada Cinta
