= Tegar (album) =

Studio album by Rossa
- Released: 25 November 1999
- Recorded: 1997–1999
- Studio: Musica Studio
- Genre: Pop
- Label: Pro-Sound; Trinity Optima
- Producer: Adi Nugroho

Rossa chronology
Nada-Nada Cinta (1996)	Tegar (1999)	Hati Yang Terpilih (2000)

Tegar is the second album by the Indonesian singer Rossa. It was released by Pro-Sound in 1999.

== History ==
Following the commercial success of Nada-Nada Cinta (1996), Rossa released her second studio album, Tegar, on 25 November 1999. The album marked an important phase in her career, consolidating her position in the Indonesian pop music scene during the late 1990s. Its lead single, “Tegar,” written by Melly Goeslaw, received significant airplay and was later selected as the theme song for the Indonesian television series Suami, Istri, dan Dia (Husband, Wife, and the Other Girl), directed by Putu Wijaya and produced by Starvision for broadcast on RCTI.

In 2000, Tegar was released in several international markets, including Malaysia, Brunei, Singapore, and Japan, through BMG Music Malaysia, reflecting Rossa’s growing regional presence. During the same year, she represented Indonesia at the My Love Festival, held in Hanoi, Vietnam, from 26 to 29 October 2000, which featured artists from various Asian countries. The album’s second single, “Biarkan Cinta Itu Ada,” further extended the album’s reach after being used as the theme song for the Brunei television series Tersayang.

== Track listing ==
1. Tegar (Melly Goeslaw)
2. Maafkan (Fatur)
3. Putri Malu (Teguh / Capunk)
4. Biarkan Cinta Itu Ada (Dian PP.)
5. Mimpi (Ricky Cahyadi)
6. Ku Kenang (Ricky Cahyadi)
7. Biarkan Tetap Ada (Angga Widodo / Iling HB)
8. Pagi Ceria (Ryan Kyoto)
9. Bagaimana Caranya (Ronny Ghaduh / Dhenda SR)
10. Biarkan (Ricky Cahyadi)
