= Kini =

Studio album by Rossa
- Released: 30 April 2002; 19 May 2003 (Repackaged Edition)
- Genre: Pop
- Label: Pro-Sound / Trinity Optima Production
- Producer: Rossa . Yonathan Nugroho

Rossa chronology
Hati Yang Terpilih (2000)	Kini (2002)	Kembali (2004)

Kini (Repackaged Edition)

Kini is a 2002 album by the Indonesian singer Rossa.

== History ==
In May 2002, Rossa released the single “Kini,” which preceded the release of her studio album Kini on 30 April 2002. The album marked a continuation of her collaboration with several established Indonesian songwriters and reflected a more mature pop sound compared with her earlier releases.

One of the album’s notable tracks was a reinterpretation of Fariz RM’s “Sakura,” which was rearranged in a city of pop style for a new generation of listeners. During the album’s promotional period, Rossa expanded her activities into television, appearing in the drama series Perisai Kasih, where her song “Kepastian” was used as the main theme song, further increasing the album’s exposure to a wider audience.

The album’s singles included “Kini,” written by Yovie Widianto, followed by “Perawan Cinta” by Melly Goeslaw, “Bila Salah” by Ricky of Five Minutes, “Sakura” by Fariz RM, and “Kepastian” by Glenn Fredly. Kini achieved strong commercial performance, selling more than 600,000 copies nationwide, and contributed to Rossa receiving the Best Pop Female Singer award at the 2003 Anugerah Musik Indonesia.

== Track listing ==
1. Bila Salah (Ricky FM)
2. Perawan Cinta (Melly Goeslaw)
3. Kepastian (Glenn Fredly)
4. Andaikan Kau Tahu (Andre Stinky)
5. Sakura (Fariz RM)
6. Tercipta Untukku (Iszur Muchtar)
7. Mengenangmu (Ady Naff)
8. Tercipta Tuk Bersatu (Katon Bagaskara)
9. Kini (Yovie Widianto)

== Reissue ==
On 19 May 2003, Rossa released Kini (Repackaged) with the addition of a new track, “Malam Pertama,” written by Melly Goeslaw for the SCTV television series of the same name. The reissue achieved double-platinum certification in early 2004 and earned Rossa a nomination for Best Female Pop Singer at the 2004 Anugerah Musik Indonesia.
