= All Access to Rossa 25 Shining Years =

2024 concert film

- Theatrical release poster
- Directed by: Ani Ema Susanti
- Produced by: Rossa; Irwan D. Mussry; P. Intan S.; Yahni Damayanti; Prilly Latuconsina
- Starring: Rossa; Rizky Langit Ramadhan; Surendro Prasetyo; Melly Goeslaw; Afgan; Ariel; Boy William; Lyodra; Eka Gustiwana; Andi Rianto
- Cinematography: Bagoes Tresna Adji
- Edited by: Oliver Sitompul; Guy Harding; Muhammad Rizky B.; Sugi Compros
- Music by: Andi Rianto
- Production companies: Time International Films; Inspire Pictures; Sinemaku Pictures
- Distributed by: 21 Cineplex; CGV Cinemas Indonesia; Cinépolis; Flix Cinema; TGV Cinemas; Cathay Cineplexes; Times Cineplex Time Square; Time Cineplex; Netflix (streaming)
- Release dates: August 1, 2024 (Indonesia); October 18, 2024 (Malaysia, Singapore, Brunei)
- Running time: 90 minutes
- Country: Indonesia
- Language: Indonesia . English

All Access to Rossa 25 Shining Years is a documentary film presented by Time International Films in collaboration with Inspire Pictures and Sinemaku Pictures. This film was released in Indonesia on August 1, 2024, and in several neighboring countries, such as Malaysia, Singapore and Brunei, on October 18, 2024. It tells the story of the career, love, and personal life of Rossa, which have not been revealed for more than 25 years.

All Access to Rossa 25 Shining Years was in development for more than three years, during which Rossa collaborated with her best friend, Prilly Latuconsina, to bring the project to fruition. It was directed by Ani Ema Susanti. In Indonesia, this film broke the record for an Indonesian solo singer documentary, achieving the highest number of viewers, with 64,731 people watching. This documentary is scheduled to air on Netflix globally starting January 1, 2025.

== Synopsis ==
For more than 25 years, Rossa has amazed the public with her distinctive, melodious voice and enchanting charm. However, behind the glittering entertainment stage lie inspiring stories and unexpected struggles of the singer, whose real name is Sri Rossa Roslaina Handiyani. The twists and turns of her life, the ups and downs of her career, the heartache she kept to herself, as well as the diva's emotional journey and golden moments, which have never been revealed before, will be unveiled in the documentary All Access to Rossa: 25 Shining Years.

The documentary film All Access to Rossa 25 Shining Years is presented by Time International Films in collaboration with Inspire Pictures and Sinemaku Pictures, and it is directed by Ani Ema Susanti. In this film, Rossa also serves as an executive producer, alongside Irwan D. Mussry, Prilly Latuconsina, P. Intan S., and Yahni Damayanti. Meanwhile, Umay Shahab, Inarah Syarafina, Sugi Compros, Alfreno Kautsar Ramadhan, and Boy Rianto Latu serve as producers.

The documentary film All Access to Rossa 25 Shining Years, which chronicles Rossa's more than 25-year career in the music industry, also highlights the stories behind her concert journey, including the people involved behind the scenes and her collaborators. These collaborators include Rizky Langit Ramadhan, Surendro Prasetyo, Andi Rianto, Melly Goeslaw, Ariel, Afgan, Boy William, Lyodra, and Eka Gustiwana, who provide their perspectives on Rossa as a diva on stage, as well as a mother and a woman in her personal life.

The documentary All Access to Rossa 25 Shining Years received support and recognition from the Ministry of Tourism and Creative Economy of the Republic of Indonesia (Kemenparekraf). Minister of Tourism and Creative Economy, Sandiaga Salahuddin Uno, expressed his support for the documentary All Access to Rossa: 25 Shining Years, which showcases the inspiring side of Rossa, the Indonesian diva, and serves as a lesson for audiences of all generations in building a long career in the creative industry, particularly in music.

== Soundtrack ==
While working on the documentary All Access to Rossa: 25 Shining Years, Rossa also collaborated with Ariel of Noah to contribute to the soundtrack. Together with Rossa, Ariel will re-record the song "Nada-Nada Cinta," written by Younky Soewarno and Maryati, which launched Rossa's career in the Indonesian music industry in 1996. This single will be released on August 8, 2024, on all digital music platforms.

Rossa recalls sweet memories of the first time she recorded this song. "When I recorded this song in the studio, honestly, it made me flashback to the first time Younky Soewarno directed. I can't believe it's been 28 years since I sang this song, and now I'm re-releasing it for a documentary on my career journey. It feels truly extraordinary to me," she said. This song was the final track recorded for her debut album of the same title and sold more than 750,000 copies. This success underscores the enduring appeal and relevance of the song, which continues to resonate with audiences today.

According to Ariel, Rossa is currently the most accomplished female singer in terms of experience. Ariel expressed his enthusiasm, saying, "There is no doubt about Rossa's talent, even though it took us eight attempts to find a suitable arrangement to make the song sound fresher."
