= Gadis Ingusan =

Studio album by Rossa
- Released: 30 December 1988
- Recorded: 1986–1988
- Studio: Pro-Sound
- Genre: Rock & Pop
- Label: Pro-Sound
- Producer: Adi Nugroho

Rossa chronology
Gadis Ingusan (1988)	Untuk Sahabatku (1990)

Gadis Ingusan (also released under the alternative title Untuk Sahabatku) is the debut studio album by Indonesian singer Rossa, released in 1988 by Pro-Sound. Recorded during her childhood, and released when she was ten years old, the album represents the earliest phase of Rossa’s professional recording career and has been discussed in multiple independent retrospective sources as a formative work preceding her later commercial breakthrough in the 1990s.

Initially, Rossa only accompanied her mother Eni Kusmiani for a vocal test at the Pro-Sound studio in Jelambar, West Jakarta. However, her playful singing using headphones caught the attention of Pro-Sound producer Budhy Paramita, who decided to create an album for her. Although the album did not achieve significant commercial success at the time of release, music journalists and biographical profiles published after Rossa’s rise to prominence frequently cite Gadis Ingusan as an important reference point in assessing her artistic development and early positioning within the Indonesian music industry.

== Background ==
Gadis Ingusan was recorded between 1986 and 1988, when Rossa was still attending elementary school. The album was produced by Budhy Paramita and featured compositions by several established Indonesian songwriters, including Addie MS, James F. Sundah, Erwin Badudu, Arthur Kaunang, and Franky Sahilatua. This presented a unique challenge, as they needed to create children's songs that deviated from the usual style. Music commentators have noted that, unlike many children’s albums released during the same period, Gadis Ingusan included material originally composed for adult performers, reflecting an early effort to position Rossa beyond the conventional children’s music market.

Rossa successfully performed songs that were considered quite challenging for the children's music category at that time.

Unfortunately, despite the significant effort put into its production, this album did not succeed in the market. This album may have been too sophisticated for children, yet it was suitable for teenagers and adults to enjoy. At the time, a ministerial ban prohibited children's songs from being broadcast on television. As a result, promotion for this album was limited. Nevertheless, it served as a strong foundation for Rossa's future career.

This album is not a profit-making project, but a prestige project. 'Just take a look—how many young singers are supported by so many famous musicians, as in this Rossa Rose album," said Budhy Paramita, the Pro-Sound boss, in a comment quoted from Ananda magazine in 1991.

Rossa stands out from other child singers due to her distinctive Lady Rocker-style voice, characterized by its exceptionally high pitch, which has been her trademark since childhood. As a young singer, Rossa's vocal style was heavily influenced by the music of Indonesian Lady Rockers such as Nicky Astria, Nike Ardilla, Anggun C. Sasmi, and Lady Avisha, as well as Western bands like The Rolling Stones and Scorpions. Because of her powerful and shrill voice, she was often referred to as "Little Rossa Rose" or "Little Lady Rocker".

== Release ==
The album was released nationally in Indonesia in 1988 by Pro-Sound. In 1990, the recordings were reissued under the alternative title Untuk Sahabatku, with a revised track sequence but no substantial changes to the musical content.

== Reception and legacy ==
At the time of its original release, Gadis Ingusan received limited mainstream attention. However, retrospective coverage in Indonesian media has positioned the album as a notable example of late-1980s Indonesian children’s pop production and as an early indicator of Rossa’s long-term career trajectory. Academic and journalistic discussions of Indonesian popular music have cited Gadis Ingusan when examining industry practices related to talent development and the transition of child performers into adult pop careers.

== Track listing ==
1. Beri Kami Kesempatan (Ted Sutejo)
2. Gadis Ingusan (Areng Widodo)
3. Ke Jakarta (Areng Widodo)
4. Tetap Melangkah (Oetje F. Tekol)
5. Untuk Sahabatku (Arthur Kaunang)
6. Gadis Ingusan (Minus One)
7. Nyanyain Anak Alam (James F. Sundah / Bucky Wikagoe / Emil Salim)
8. Sembilan (Franky Sahilatua)
9. Citra (Erwin Badudu)
10. Elegi Anak Pelaut (Alex Lia)
11. Aku ♥ Indonesia (Erwin Badudu)
