= Love, Life & Music =

- Digital and standard edition cover

Studio album by Rossa
- Released: 15 May 2014
- Genre: Pop
- Label: Trinity Optima Production
- Producer: Rossa. Yonathan Nugroho

Rossa chronology
Platinum Collection (2013)	Love, Life & Music (2014)	A New Chapter (2017)

Singles from Love, Life & Music
- 1. "Hijrah Cinta" Released: February 26, 2013; 2. "Jatuh Cinta Setiap Hari" Released: December 2014; 3. "Kamu Yang Kutungu (feat. Afgan)" Released: February 2015

Love, Life & Music is a studio album by Indonesian singer Rossa

== History ==
After a six-year hiatus from releasing studio albums, Rossa released Love, Life & Music on 15 May 2014 through Trinity Optima Production. The album consists of ten new tracks and explores themes of love, life, and music. The standard edition received million certification. The special edition was certified by the Indonesian World Records Museum (MURI) and the Indonesian Recording Industry Association (ASIRI) after selling more than 100,000 copies on its first day of release.

The album’s lead single in Indonesia was “Hijrah Cinta,” which was featured in the soundtrack of the movie Hijrah Cinta. In Malaysia, the lead single was “Salahkah,” a duet with Hafiz Suip, which appeared on the soundtrack television series Bukan Kerana Aku Tak Cinta. The album received five nominations at the 2014 World Music Awards.

Several singles from the album, including “Salahkah” and “Kamu Yang Kutunggu,” received awards from the Anugerah Musik Indonesia, Anugerah Industri Muzik Malaysia, and Anugerah Planet Muzik Singapore.

== Track listing ==
Standard Edition

1. Jatuh Cinta Setiap Hari
2. Sisakan Hatimu
3. Kamu Yang Kutunggu (featuring Afgan)
4. Hijrah Cinta
5. Bukan Bukan
6. Setia Menanti
7. Milyaran Abad
8. Hati Tak Bertuan
9. Salahkah (featuring Hafiz)
10. As One

Special Edition

1. Your Dreams Our Inspirations
2. Jatuh Cinta Setiap Hari
3. Sisakan Hatimu
4. Kamu Yang Kutunggu (featuring Afgan)
5. Hijrah Cinta
6. Bukan Bukan
7. Setia Menanti
8. Milyaran Abad
9. Hati Tak Bertuan
10. Salahkah (featuring Hafiz)
11. As One

== Certifications ==
Region	Certification	Certified units/sales
Indonesia	—	1,400,000
