= Bersihkan Dirimu =

EP by Afgan
- Released: 2009
- Recorded: 2009
- Genre: Pop
- Length: 15:41
- Language: Bahasa Indonesia
- Label: Wanna B Music Production; Sony Music Entertainment Indonesia

Afgan chronology
Confession No.1 (2008)	Bersihkan Dirimu (2009)	The One (2010)

Singles from Bersihkan Dirimu
- 1. "Pada-Mu Kubersujud"; 2. "Pencari Jalan-Mu"

Bersihkan Dirimu is the first extended play album by Indonesian singer Afgan Syahreza. It was released in 2009. The album has four songs, including Pencari Jalan-Mu and Pada-Mu Kubersujud. The single Terima Kasih Cinta was taken from a previous album, Confession No.1.

== Track listing ==
Bersihkan Dirimu
No.	Title	Writer(s)	Length
1.	"Pencari Jalan-Mu"	Fajar "Element"	3:26
2.	"Pada-Mu Kubersujud"	Bebi Romeo	3:27
3.	"Terima Kasih Cinta"	Mario Ricardo PU	4:11
4.	"Pencari Jalan-Mu" (minus one)	Fajar "Element"	3:58
