= Rossa (album) =

Rossa (Self-Titled)

Studio album by Rossa
- Released: 14 January 2009
- Recorded: 2005–2008
- Genre: Pop
- Label: Pro Sound / Trinity Optima Production
- Producer: Rossa . Yonathan Nugroho

Rossa chronology
Yang Terpilih (2006)	Rossa (Self-Titled) (2010)	Harmoni Jalinan Nada & Cerita (2010)

Rossa is a 2009 album by the Indonesian singer Rossa.

== History ==
Following the success of the Ayat-Ayat Cinta soundtrack, Rossa released her self-titled studio album Rossa on 14 January 2009. The album marked a significant phase in her career and was developed over an extended period of approximately three years. Its lead single, “Terlanjur Cinta,” featured a duet with Pasha of Ungu and was written by Surendro Prasetyo.

Rossa later stated that the album had originally been planned for release in 2005 but was postponed as she spent several years collecting material and refining its concept. She ultimately considered 2009 an appropriate time for its release. To support the album, Rossa embarked on a promotional concert tour titled Cerita Cinta Rossa, which covered seven major cities in Indonesia and one city in Malaysia.

This album became her final album released under the Pro-Sound label and achieved strong commercial success, reportedly selling more than 1.5 million copies.

Another track from the album, “Hati Yang Kau Sakiti,” gained continued exposure through its use as a soundtrack for several Indonesian television series, including Air Mata Cinta (2009), Cerita Nyata (2018), and Suara Hati Istri (2019), extending the album’s relevance beyond its initial release period.

== Track listing ==
1. Hey Ladies (Melly Goeslaw)
2. Hati Yang Kau Sakiti (Enda Ungu)
3. Terlanjur Cinta feat. Pasha (Surendro Prasetyo)
4. Kecewa (Melly Goeslaw)
5. 1000 Malam (Ricky FM)
6. Hati Yang Kau Sakiti – Piano Version (Enda Ungu)
7. Tega (Aji Mirza Hakim)
8. Cerita Cinta (‘Nda)
9. Keajaiban Cinta (Badai (musisi)|Badai Kerispatih)
10. Impas (Yoyo Prasetyo)
11. Sakit Hatiku (Valent)
12. Takkan Berpaling Dari-Mu (Aji Mirza Hakim)
