= Platinum Collection (Rossa album) =

Studio album by Rossa
- Released: 18 June 2013
- Genre: Pop
- Label: Trinity Optima Production
- Producer: Rossa; Yonathan Nugroho

Rossa chronology
The Best of Rossa (2011)	Platinum Collection (2013)	Love, Life & Music (2014)

Platinum Collection is a studio album by Rossa, and is a repackaging of the album The Best of Rossa. This album is special for Pecinta Rossa (Rossa fans) in Indonesia, because it added a new song which was never released by Rossa on her albums in Indonesia, Aku Bersahaja and Ku Pinang Kau Dengan Bismillah. This album was released on 18 June 2013 by Trinity Optima Production and Gramedia Bookstore Indonesia.

== Track listing ==
1. Aku Bersahaja featuring Taufik Batisah (Taufik Batisah)
2. Tak Sanggup Lagi (Aji Mirza Hakim)
3. Ku Pinang Kau Dengan Bismillah featuring Ungu (Enda “Ungu”)
4. Ku Menunggu (Mery LC)
5. Terlanjur Cinta featuring Pasha "Ungu" (Yoyo Prasetyo)
6. Pudar (Hendra Nurcahya)
7. Aku Bukan Untukmu (Aji Mirza Hakim)
8. Ayat-Ayat Cinta (Melly Goeslaw)
9. Hati Yang Kau Sakiti (Enda "Ungu")
10. Tegar (Melly Goeslaw)
11. Kini (Yovie Widyanto)
12. Atas Nama Cinta (Melly Goeslaw)
13. Memeluk Bulan (Enda "Ungu")
14. Jangan Ada Dusta Diantara Kita featuring Broery Marantika (Harry Tasman)
15. Perawan Cinta (Melly Goeslaw)
