= Bhavani Shankar =

Indian pakhawaj drum player (1956–2023)

Pandit Bhavani Shankar Kathak
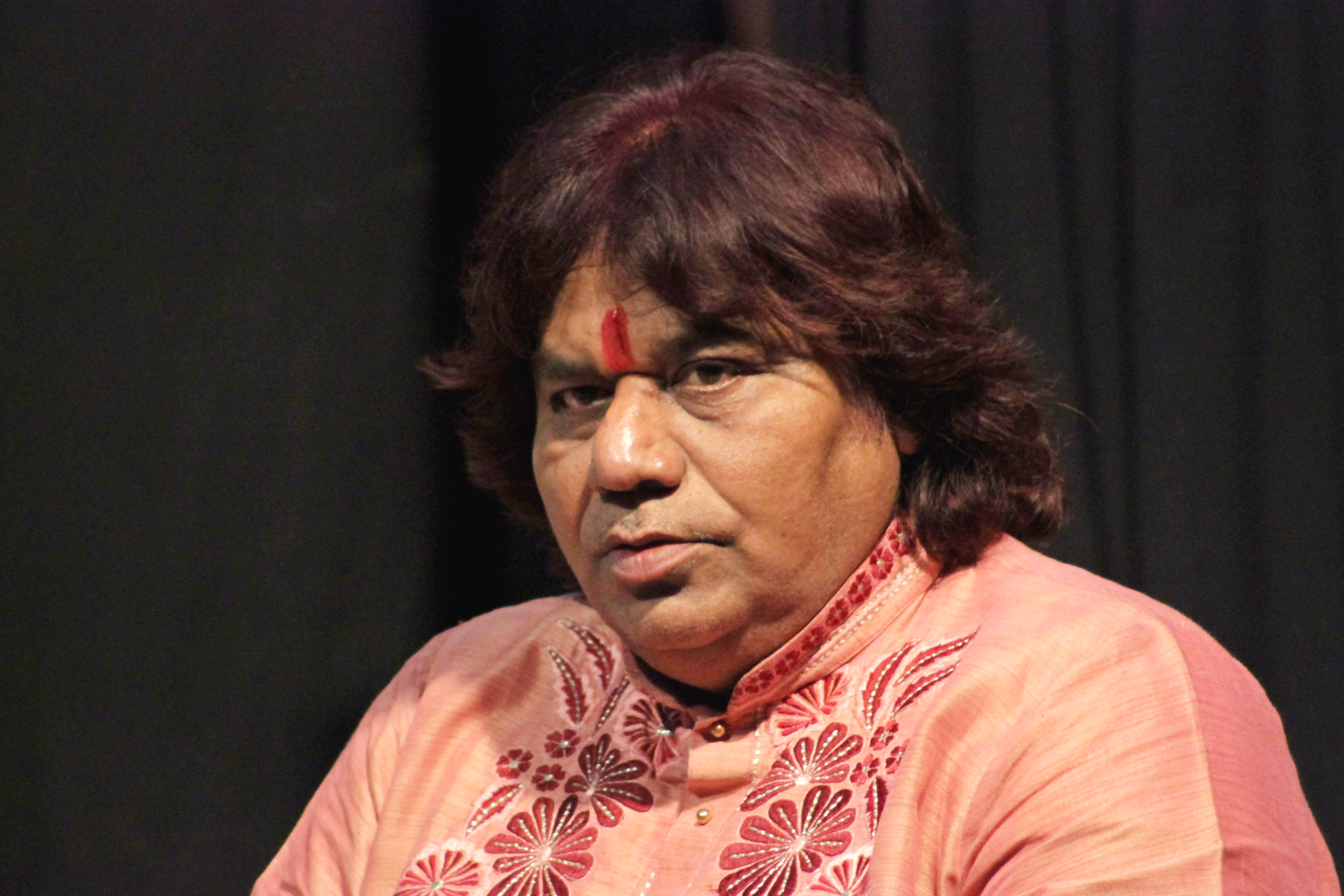

Background information
- Born: 1956
- Died: 30 December 2023 (aged 66–67)
- Genres: Hindustani classical music, film score
- Instrument: Pakhawaj

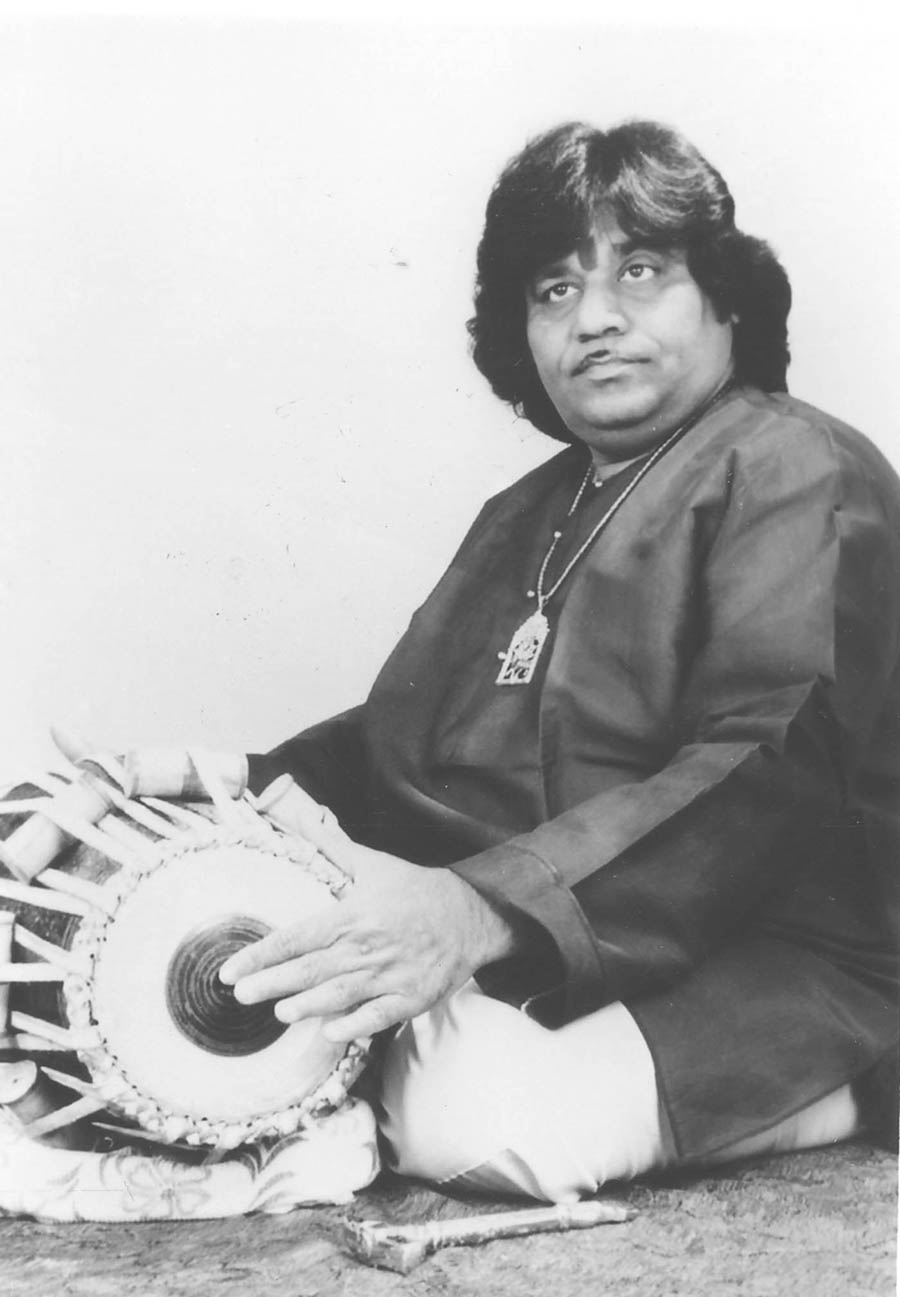
A still of Shri Bhawani Shankar Kathak who will be presented with the Sangeet Natak Akademi Award for Hindustani Music- Instrumental (Pakhawaj) by the President Dr. A.P.J Abdul Kalam in New Delhi on 26 October 2004

Bhavani Shankar (1956 – 30 December 2023) was an Indian pakhawaj drum player.

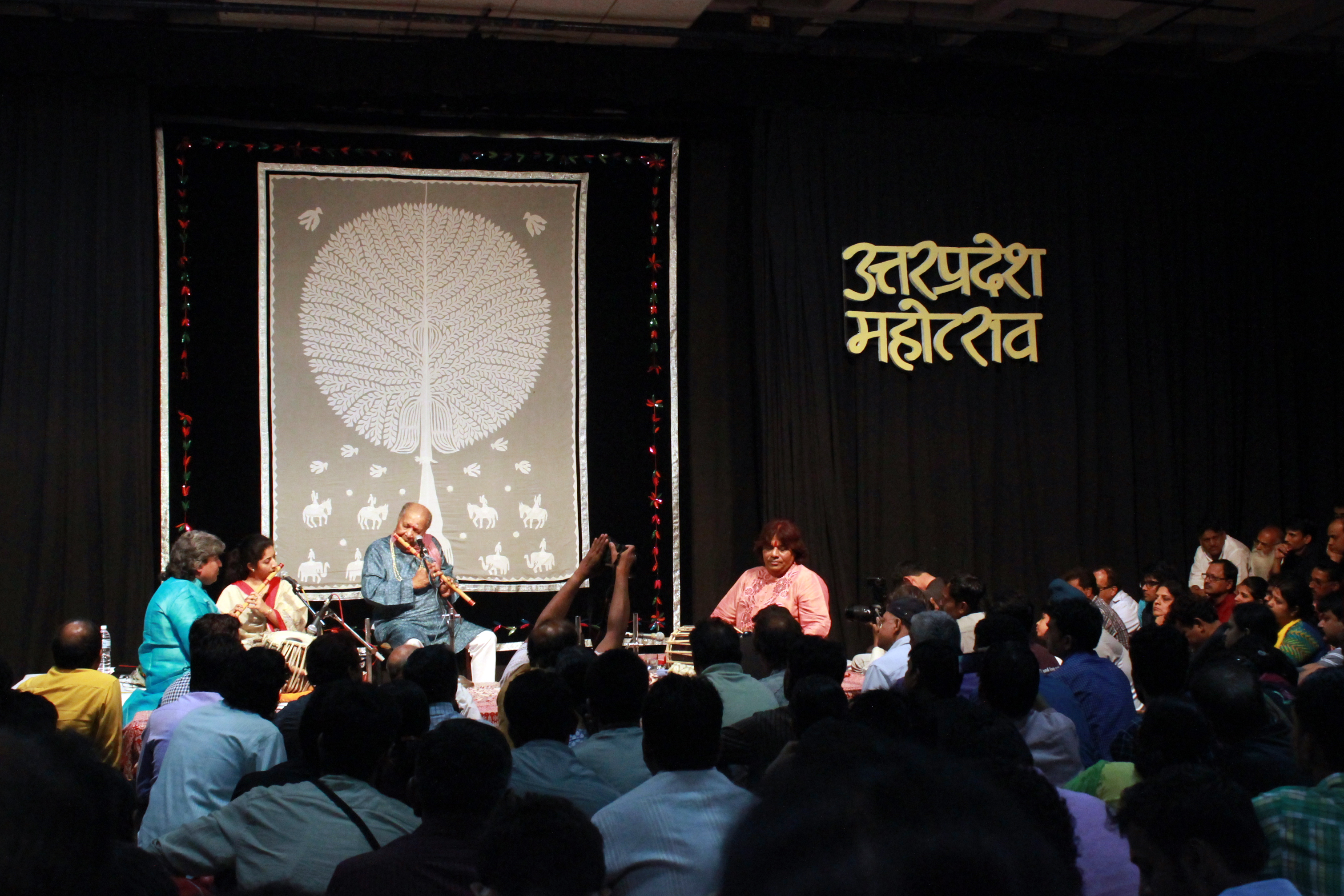
Hariprasad Chaurasia and Bhavani Shankar performing at Bharat Bhavan Bhopal in Uttar Pradesh Mahotsav

Bhavani Shankar was born into a musical family, beginning his study of pakhawaj and tabla at the age of eight. His father Babulalji was a renowned Kathak performer, a style of Indian classical dance. He played with many Indian artists including bansuri player Hariprasad Chaurasia, santoor player Shiv Kumar Sharma and tabla players Zakir Hussain and Anindo Chatterjee. In later years he made his mark as a composer for films and experimental fusion projects.

Shankar died from a cardiac arrest on 30 December 2023.
