= A New Chapter (Rossa album) =

Studio album by Rossa
- Released: April 5, 2017
- Genres: Pop, R&B, electronic
- Label: Trinity Optima Production
- Producer: Rossa

Rossa chronology
Love, Life & Music (2014)	A New Chapter (2017)	Another Journey : The Beginning (2023)

A New Chapter is a 2017 album by the Indonesian singer Rossa .

== History ==
Initially Rossa wanted to look for song material and producers in Los Angeles in January 2016, but this intention was abandoned because she had the opportunity to meet Mariah Carey, Katy Perry, Rihanna, One Direction, and Selena Gomez in Bali in April 2016 at "The Invitational Group's 2016 Bali Songwriting" event.

On this album Rossa recorded nine new songs, five of which are in Indonesian and the other 4 songs are in English. On June 9 2016 Rossa launched a single entitled "Jangan Hilangkan Dia" for the soundtrack of the film "ILY from 38,000 FT" created by Ryan D'Masiv and the music was composed by Tushar Apte. The vocal producer is Mitch Allan.

The single was released simultaneously in Indonesia, Malaysia, Singapore and Brunei Darussalam and won an award from YouTube Rewind 2016 as one of the 10 Most Popular Music Videos on YouTube Indonesia which was ranked 5th. On iTunes, the single "Jangan Hilangkan Dia" was in the No. 1 position on iTunes Soundtrack Indonesia for more than six months.

The first English single launched by Rossa on this album was "Body Speak" created by Steve Shebby, Joleen Belle and Michelle Buzz. This single was first launched on February 22 2017 in Singapore 2 weeks after Rossa released the single "Love in My Life" for the soundtrack of the film "London Love Story 2" in Indonesia.

In the original version, the song Body Speak is an explicit content song, but some of the lyrics have been changed to make it more implicit. For this song, Rossa was the first Indonesian artist to enter the MTV Asia Spotlight Artist of the Month. For a month, Rossa's Body Speak video clip was also shown in Hong Kong, Taiwan, Japan, the Philippines, Tokyo, Korea, and China. The album sold more than 400,000 albums in nine months and received awards from Indonesia, Asia and the US.

== Track listing ==
1. Break It Up (Stuart Crichton / Fiona Bevan / Gatlin Green)
2. Bukan Maksudku (Taufik Batisah)
3. T’lah Mencoba (Dewiq & Pay)
4. Cinta Dalam Hidupku (David Sam)
5. Satu Hal Bodoh (Aji Mirza Hakim)
6. Till My Heart Stops Beating (Hugo Lira / Thomas Gustaffson)
7. Jangan Hilangkan Dia (Ryan D’Masiv | Produced : Tushar Apte)
8. Body Speak (Steve Shebby/ Joleen Belle/ Michelle Buzz)
9. Firefly (Mitch Allan / Nikki Leonti)
