= The One (Afgansyah Reza album) =

Studio album by Afgan Syahreza
- Released: April 1, 2010
- Recorded: 2009
- Genre: Pop
- Length: 45:57
- Language: Bahasa Indonesia
- Label: Wanna B Music Production
- Producer: Wanna B Music Producer

Afgan Syahreza chronology
| Bersihkan Dirimu (2009) | The One (2010) | L1ve to Love, Love to L1ve (2013) |

Singles from The One
- 1. "Bukan Cinta Biasa"; 2. "Wajahmu Mengalihkan Duniamu"; 3. "Pencari Jalan-Mu"; 4. "Cinta 2 Hati"; 5. "Dia Dia Dia"; 6. "Bawalah Cintaku"; 7. "Panah Asmara"

The One is the second studio album by Indonesian singer Afgan. It was released on April 1, 2010. The album has 12 songs, including "Bukan Cinta Biasa", "Panah Asmara", "Dia Dia Dia", and "Bawalah Cintaku".

The single "Cinta 2 Hati" was used on the soundtrack of the Indonesian film Cinta 2 Hati, starring Afgan and Olivia Jensen.

The single "Seperti Bintang" was used in an advertisement for the Indonesian brand Panadol Cold & Flu.

== Track listing ==
| No. | Title | Writer(s) | Length |
|---|---|---|---|
| 1. | "Tak Peduli" | Bemby Noor; Wisnu; Alfoncius | 3:14 |
| 2. | "Cinta 2 Hati" | Mario Ricardo PU | 4:24 |
| 3. | "Bukan Cinta Biasa" | Bebi Romeo | 4:06 |
| 4. | "Wajahmu Mengalirkan Duniamu" | Bemby Noor | 3:09 |
| 5. | "Bawalah Cintaku" | Bebi Romeo | 3:53 |
| 6. | "Dia Dia Dia" | Bemby Noor | 3:08 |
| 7. | "Panah Asmara" | Tohpati | 4:33 |
| 8. | "Masih Untukmu" | Bemby Noor | 3:48 |
| 9. | "Semurni Kasih" | Dian Permana Poetra | 4:24 |
| 10. | "Rumahmu Jauh" | Bemby Noor; Wisnu; Alfoncius | 3:20 |
| 11. | "Seperti Bintang" | Fajar "Element"; Robby "Phantom"; GSK | 3:49 |
| 12. | "Pencari Jalan-Mu" | Fajar "Element" | 4:04 |
| Total length: | | | 45:57 |
