= Afgan (singer) =

Indonesian singer and actor

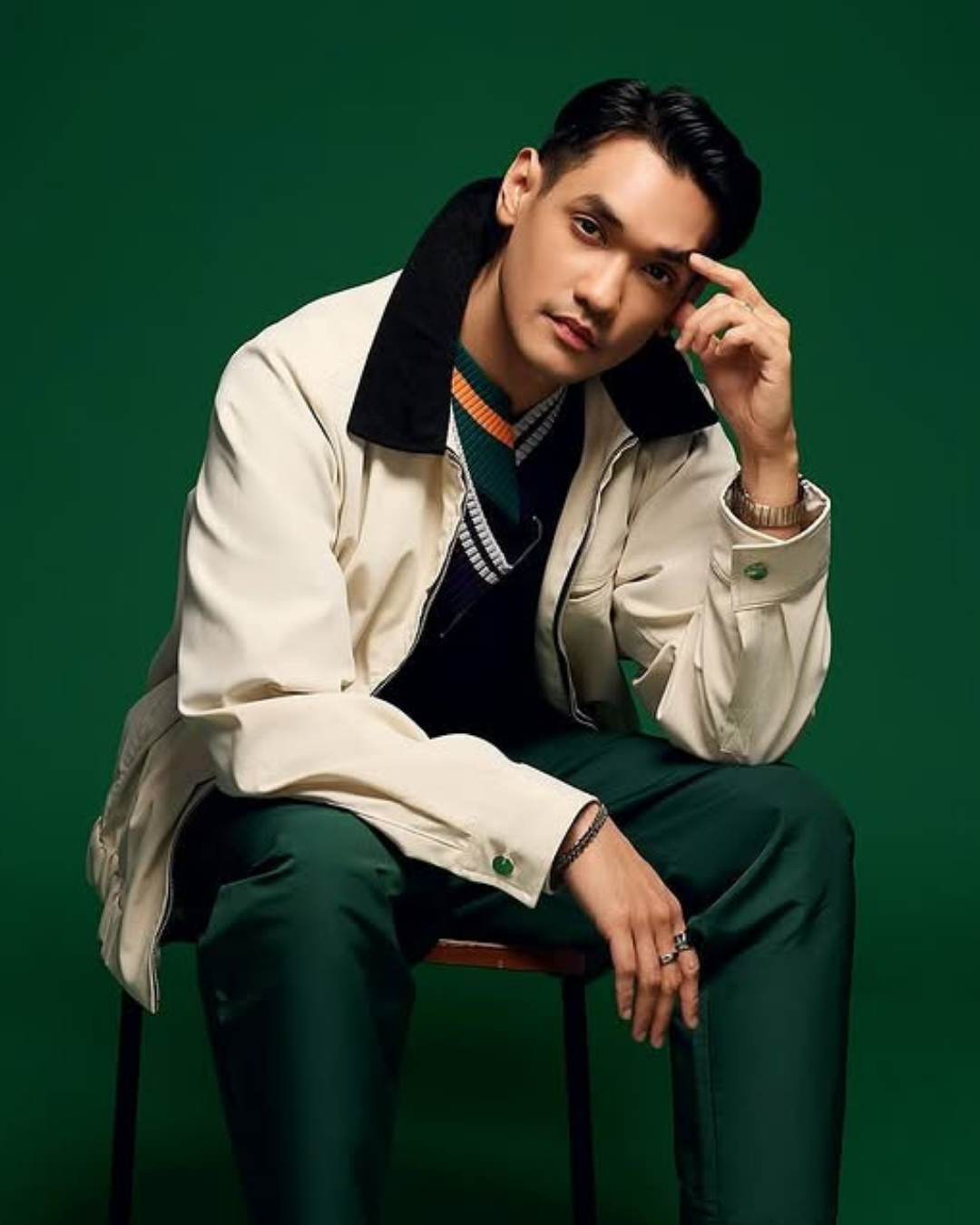
- Afgan in 2025
- Born: Afgansyah Reza; 27 May 1989 (age 37); Jakarta, Indonesia
- Education: Monash University Malaysia (BE)
- Occupations: Singer; actor
- Years active: 2007–present
- Musical career
- Genres: Pop; R&B; soul; jazz
- Labels: Wanna B Music Production; Keci Music Production; Trinity Optima Production; Hits Records; Empire

Afgansyah Reza (born 27 May 1989), better known by his mononym Afgan, is an Indonesian singer and actor, known for his pop and R&B songs.

== Early life and education ==
Afgansyah Reza was born on 27 May 1989 in Jakarta, into a Muslim musical family of Minangkabau origin, although he never had any vocal training. He is the second of four children of Lloyd Yahya and Lola Purnama.

He has a Bachelor's in Economics from Monash University.

== Career ==
Afgan's career started when he and a group of friends decided to record a private album at Wanna B Instant Recording Studio. Impressed by his singing, the producers at the studio offered him a contract.. His first album, Confession No.1, was a mix of jazz, pop, and R&B influences and included tracks, such as "Terima Kasih Cinta", "Klise", "Sadis", and "Tanpa Batas Waktu". A music video for the song "Terima Kasih Cinta" was produced by Thalita Latief and directed by Jose Purnomo.

In 2009, he made his first foray into acting when he appeared in the film Bukan Cinta Biasa with Olivia Jensen, and he also sang the title track for the film's soundtrack. In 2010, he appeared in the film Cinta 2 Hati and performed on the film's soundtrack.

His second album, The One, was released in January 2010. In 2011, he performed the theme song at the Southeast Asian Games.

He released the album Live to Love in 2013, followed by Sides in 2016 and Dekade in 2018. In November 2018, Afgan celebrated 10 years in the music industry by kicking off his "Dekade" concert in Kuala Lumpur, Malaysia, followed by another concert in Jakarta in September 2019. Both concerts were sold out.

In 2020, Afgan, together with Raisa, released the single "Tunjukkan" five years after their first collaboration. Afgan had just released a new single on 6 February 2021, called "I'm Sorry". His first global album Wallflower, containing 10 tracks, was released on 9 April 2021.

In 2022, he moved away from pop music to embrace a more R&B style, with tracks such as "So Wrong But So Right" and "Ku Dengannya Kau Dengan Dia".

On 26 May 2024, Afgan performed with Bebi Romeo at the Java Jazz Festival 2024.

== Recognition and awards ==
Afgan won the Best Solo Male Vocalist Award for the song at the 2009 Anugerah Musik Indonesia.

He was named one of "10 Indonesian hip hop and R&B artists to check out right now" by HipHopDX in June 2022.

== Discography ==
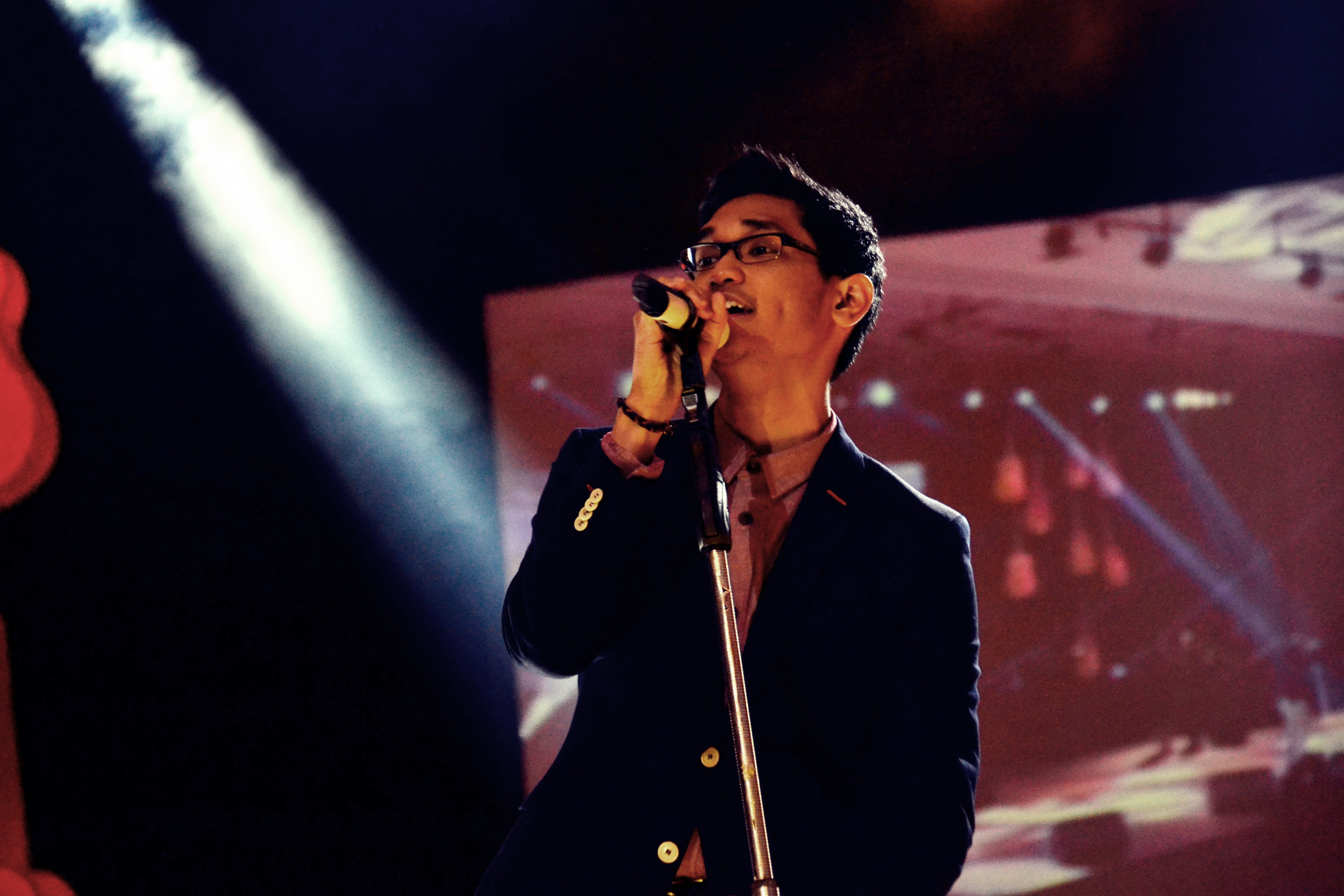
Afgan performing in 2013

=== Studio albums ===
Title	Album details
Confession No.1	Released: January 2008; Label: Wanna B Music Production; Formats: CD, digital download
The One	Released: 1 April 2010; Label: Wanna B Music Production; Formats: CD, digital download
L1ve to Love, Love to L1ve	Released: 13 February 2013; Label: Trinity Optima Production; Formats: CD, digital download
Sides	Released: 10 August 2016; Label: Trinity Optima Production; Formats: CD, digital download

=== Extended plays ===
Title	EP details
PadaMu kubersujud	Released: August 2009; Label: WannaB Music Production, Wanna B Music Production; Formats: CD, digital download
AIR (with Isyana Sarasvati and Rendy Pandugo)	Released: 26 April 2019; Label: Sony Music Indonesia, Trinity Optima Production; Formats: Digital download

=== Singles ===
Title	Year	Producer(s)	Label	Album
"Terima Kasih Cinta"	2008	Mario Kacang	Wanna B Music Production	Confession No.1
"Sadis"	2008	Bebi Romeo	Wanna B Music Production	Confession No.1
"Pada-Mu Kubersujud"	2008	Bebi Romeo	Wanna B Music Production	Bersihkan Dirimu
"Bukan Cinta Biasa"	2009	Bebi Romeo	Wanna B Music Production	The One
"Wajahmu Mengalihkan Duniaku"	2009	Bemby Noor	Wanna B Music Production	The One
"Pencari JalanMu"	2009	Fajar PJ Maringka	Wanna B Music Production	The One
"Cinta 2 Hati"	2010	Mario Kacang	Wanna B Music Production	The One
"Dia Dia Dia"	2010	Bemby Noor	Wanna B Music Production	The One
"Bawalah Cintaku"	2010	Bebi Romeo	Wanna B Music Production	The One
"Dalam Mihrab Cinta"	2010	Bebi Romeo	Keci Music Production	OST Dalam Mihrab Cinta
"Panah Asmara"	2011	Tohpati	Wanna B Music Production	The One
"Kembali"	2011	—N/a	Trinity Optima Production	Non-album single
"Bunga Terakhir"	2012	Bebi Romeo	Mega Music	Bebi Romeo Mega Hits
"Pesan Cinta"	2012	Afgan, Inu (Numata), Nino (RAN)	Trinity Optima Production	L1ve to Love, Love to L1ve
"Jodoh Pasti Bertemu"	2013	Bemby Noor	Trinity Optima Production	L1ve to Love, Love to L1ve
"Sabar"	2013	Bebi Romeo	Trinity Optima Production	L1ve to Love, Love to L1ve
"Katakan Tidak"	2014	Alam Urbach	Trinity Optima Production	L1ve to Love, Love to L1ve
"Ku Mohon"	2014	Bemby Noor	Trinity Optima Production	Non-album single
"Untukmu Aku Bertahan"	2014	David Kurnia Albert	Trinity Optima Production	L1ve to Love, Love to L1ve
"Kamu yang Ku Tunggu" (featuring Rossa)	2014	Alam Urbach	Trinity Optima Production	Love, Life & Music
"Knock Me Out"	2015	Taufik Batisah	Trinity Optima Production	Sides
"Percayalah" (featuring Raisa)	2015	Afgan, Raisa, Adrian Rahmat, Kitut	Trinity Optima Production, Juni Records	Sides
"Kunci Hati"	2016	Afgan, Inu (Numata)	Trinity Optima Production	Sides
"Jalan Terus"	2016	Alam Urbach	Trinity Optima Production	Sides
"Kau dengannya Ku dengan Dia"	2017	Afgan, Rian (D'Masiv)	Trinity Optima Production	Sides
"X" (featuring SonaOne)	2017	Afgan, SonaOne, Mhala (Numata)	Trinity Optima Production	Sides
"Heaven" (featuring Isyana Sarasvati & Rendy Pandugo)	2018	Afgan, Isyana Sarasvati, Rendy Pandugo	Sony Music Entertainment Indonesia, Trinity Optima Production	Dekade
"Be Alright"	2018			Asian Games 2018: Energy of Asia
"Shallow Water"	2024			

== Filmography ==
=== Film ===
Year	Title	Role	Note
2009	Bukan Cinta Biasa	Himself	Guest star
2010	Cinta 2 Hati	Alfa	Lead role
2013	Refrain	Nata	Lead role

=== Television ===
Year	Title	Role	Note	Network
2008	OB (Office Boy)	Himself	Guest star	RCTI
2008–2012	Doa Berbuka Puasa	Himself		SCTV
2014	Rising Star Indonesia (season 1)	Himself	Guest Judge; only appears in the Top 5	RCTI
2015	X Factor Indonesia	Himself	Judge	RCTI
