= Mahabhashyam Chittaranjan =

Indian author and composer (1938–2023)

Mahabhashyam Chittaranjan (25 August 1938 – 21 July 2023) was an Indian author, composer, teacher, and player of Telugu light music. He appeared in many programs on All India Radio over a 60-year period.

== Childhood and family ==
Mahabhashyam Chittaranjan's father Sri. Rangachary was a retired chief engineer of All India Radio. His mother Smt. Perin Devi was a musician and played veena, violin, and harmonium. He had three brothers and two sisters.

Chittaranjan was initially trained in music by his mother and then by Sri. Putcha Subba Rao garu, father of composer Sri P.V.Sai Baba. Later, he learned music from Padma Vibhushan Dr. Mangalampally Balamurali Krishna and accompanied him in several concerts for several years. Chittaranjan started singing on Deccan Radio, under the Nizam government from the age of eight years. He could sing very complicated songs . Mandapati Venkata Raju garu, a music composer at Radio encouraged the young boy and made him sing playback for female artistes also.

== Career ==
=== Singer and Music composer ===
Chittaranjan appeared regularly on radio and sang a wide variety of songs. He worked under Master Venu in the Telugu film industry and was associate music director for Vidhi Vilasam. He composed and taught light music songs in the program Ee Paata Nerchukundaama and to children in the program Kalasi Paadudaam in various languages.

In 1971, Chittaranjan joined All India Radio service as a music composer . He contributed numerous light music songs in Telugu and various other Indian languages. He appeared as a judge in one episode of Padutha Theeyaga. He mentored many singers.

Chittaranjan retired from All India Radio in 1997.

=== Books ===
- Lalitha Sangeetham 80 Sangeeta Saraswatha Malaya Maaruthaalu,
- Sri Chittaranjanam - A Collection of Keertanas, Subrahmanya Tatvam,
- Lalitha Sangeetha Sourabham.

Chittaranjan prepared a syllabus for a light music diploma course in Telugu University.

== Personal life and death ==
Chittaranjan's wife, Padmini Chittaranjan, is a lyricist. She was also a principal of a junior college. The couple had three daughters, Vijayalakshmi, Vandana, Amrutha Valli, and a son, Srinivasa Harish.

Mahabhashyam Chittaranjan died on 21 July 2023, at the age of 84.

== Awards and honours ==
- Kala Ratna from AP Government - 2008
- Honorary Doctorate of Philosophy from International University of Complementary Medicine, Sri Lanka
