= Another Journey: The Beginning =

Studio album by Rossa
- Released: February 1, 2023
- Genre: Pop . Rap
- Label: Inspire Music
- Producer: Rossa

Rossa chronology
| A New Chapter (2017) | Another Journey: The Beginning (2023) |

Another Journey: The Beginning is a 2023 album by the Indonesian singer Rossa.

== History ==
After nearly six years of not releasing a new album, Indonesian pop singer Rossa released Another Journey: The Beginning in February 2023, the first part of her planned trilogy of albums under the Inspire Music. The album was released to coincide with the month of love and to mark Rossa's 25-year career in the Indonesian music industry.

This album contains ten songs in collaboration with several skilled composers such as Yovie Widianto, Enda Ungu, Melly Goeslaw, Ryan D'Masiv, Glenn Fredly, Candra Darusman as well as several talented young composers such as Andmesh Kamaleng, Mahalini, Boy William and Barsena Bestandhi. Self-produced, the album drew inspiration from various generations of pop music

This album, which was produced by Rossa, immediately received Double Platinum (150,000 copies) in just 22 days after its launch and became the fastest and highest selling album in 2023. Meanwhile, on iTunes this album occupied the No.1 position just a few minutes after its release, as well as becoming the No.1 best-selling pop album for Indonesian female singers. Three months after its release, this album received 4× Platinum because it sold more than 300,000 copies.

Rossa supported the album with a concert tour across Malaysia, Singapore, and Indonesia. Eight months after its release, Another Journey : The Beginning album received additional multi-platinum certifications after surpassing 500,000 copies sold.

== Track listing ==
1. Intro (Tintin, Alexander Hong, Gayatri Candra)
2. Wanita (Rian Ekky Pradipta)
3. Masih (Nino Kayam & Yovie Widianto)
4. Terlalu Berharap (Andmesh Kamaleng)
5. Sekali Ini Saja (Glenn Fredly)
6. The Heart You Hurt / Hati Yang Kau Sakiti (Korean Version) (Franco Medjaya Kusuma / Enda Ungu)
7. Bertengkar Manis feat. Barsena Bestandhi (Barsena Bestandhi)
8. Lupakan Cinta (Tintin & Mahalini)
9. Kau feat. Boy William (Tito Soemarsono, Candra Darusman, Pancasilawan)
10. Akhirnya (Melly Goeslaw)
