= Chen Mao-shuen =

Taiwanese composer (1936–2023)

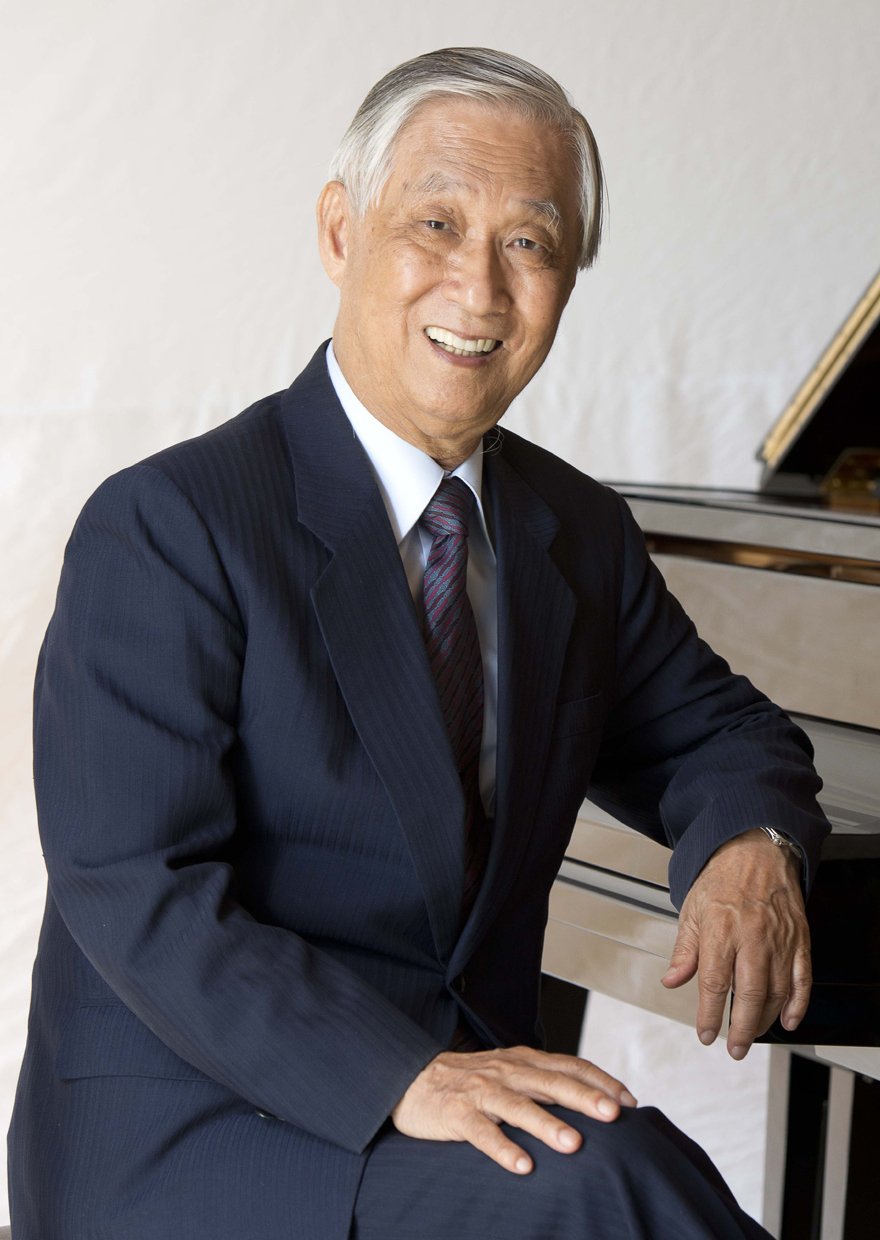
Chen in 2013

Chen Mao-shuen (Chinese: 陳茂萱; 7 January 1936 – 15 July 2023) was a Taiwanese composer and music educator.

To combine his Western-oriented musical education and Chinese-Taiwanese cultural tradition, he created music that is Western-structured and played with Western musical instruments, but his music has a Chinese-Taiwanese characteristic and spirit in its sound. His compositions reflect both traditional Western Classical and Chinese music influences.

Most of his musical creations belong to piano music. Although his piano sonatas are sophisticated to play and offer pianists the opportunity to demonstrate their virtuosity, they are suitable for piano training with a high demand on musicality.

Due to his work as a music professor at National Taiwan Normal University, he elaborated systematically teaching materials for music education from the primary school level to the secondary school level, with a focus on solfège practice and fundamental music training.

In cooperation with Taiwanese contemporary poets, for example Xi Murong, he composed several lieder that reflect the zeitgeist of modern Taiwanese society.

In 2013, Chen Mao-shuen was honored by the 17th National Awards of Art in Taiwan for his contributions to music composition and education.

== Biography ==
In 1955, Chen Mao-shuen enrolled in the department of music at Taiwan Provincial Normal College (now National Taiwan Normal University), majoring in piano. In his last college year, he studied music analysis and composition with Hsu Tsang-houei, who had just finished his studies in France and come back to Taiwan. He began to teach at Chiayi Normal College (presently National Chiayi University) in 1966. In 1970, he went to Vienna to study composition at the Hochschule für Musik und Darstellende Kunst (now University of Music and Performing Arts Vienna). In 1972, Chen returned from Vienna and began to teach music at Soochow University and National Taiwan Normal University.

From 1985 to 1991, Chen was dean of the Department of Music and Institute of Music Research at National Taiwan Normal University. He also served as deputy director of the Experimental Symphony Orchestra (now the National Symphony Orchestra) and the National Experimental Choir (now the Taiwan National Choir). After retiring from National Taiwan Normal University in 1999, Chen began to teach as a guest professor for the department of music at Shih Chien University. Beginning in 2008, Chen taught as a distinguished visiting professor in the Department of Applied Music at Aletheia University.

Chen died on 15 July 2023, at the age of 87.

== Contributions to composition and music education ==
Chen made considerable contributions to composition and music education in Taiwan. To promote contemporary music composition, he organized a music society called Waves Music in 1962. In 1983, in collaboration with his students, he formed a composer organization called Formusica, which has now expanded with about 30 regular composer members and organizes annual concerts to introduce new compositions.

In 1992, with the pianist Wang En, he co-established the WACH Conservatory of Music, which introduced several fundamental music teaching materials and set up an integrated music testing system in Taiwan.

== Compositions ==
- 17 piano sonatas from 1960 to 2017
- 35 piano sonatinas from 1980 to 2015
- 2 piano nocturnes
- 2 piano fantasy ballads
- 1 ballad for two pianos
- 14 pieces of chamber music
- 5 pieces for symphony orchestra
- 4 concertos for piano, cello, trumpet, and oboe
- 29 Chinese lieder
- 1 musical ballet: Dayan and Tien Lien

== Publications for music education ==
- 1983: Lessons and Exercises on Music Theory
- 1984: Music for Solfège Practice Vol. 1-4
- 1984: Atonal Music for Solfège Practice Vol. 1-2
- 1984: Solfège for Pitch and Rhythmic Practice
- 1984: Fundamental Rhythmic Lessons and Exercise
- 1986: Lessons and Exercises on Slow Beats
- 1987: Clave Lessons and Exercises for Piano 2:3, 3:2
- 1990: Clave Lessons and Exercises for Piano 3:4, 4:3
- 1995: Fundamental Music Training (84 vols.)
