= L1ve to Love, Love to L1ve =

L1ve To Love, Love to L1ve

Studio album by Afgan
- Released: February 14, 2013
- Recorded: 2012
- Genre: Pop
- Length: 40:20
- Label: Trinity Optima Production

Afgan chronology
'The One' (2010)	L1ve To Love, Love to L1ve (2013)	'Sides' (2016)

Singles from L1ve to Love, Love to L1ve
- 1. "Pesan Cinta" Released: December 2012; 2. "Jodoh Pasti Bertemu" Released: June 2013; 3. "Sabar" Released: November 2013; 4. "Katakan Tidak" Released: February 2014; 5. "Untukmu Aku Bertahan" Released: August 2014

L1ve to Love, Love to L1ve is a third studio album by Indonesian singer, Afgan. It was released on February 14, 2013 by Trinity Optima Production. The first single from this album, "Pesan Cinta", was released in November 2012.

This album contains ten tracks which also included songs that had already been released as a soundtrack a movie or television series. In marketing this album, Afgan and the record label working with KFC that this album will be circulated in all KFC stores in Indonesia.

== Track listing ==
No.	Title	Writer(s)	Length
1.	"Katakan Tidak"	Alam Urbach	3:26
2.	"Jodoh Pasti Bertemu"	Bemby Noor	4:06
3.	"Cinta Tanpa Syarat"	Alam Urbach	4:14
4.	"Sabar"	Bebi Romeo	4:45
5.	"Pesan Cinta"	Afgan, Inu Numata, Nino RAN	4:23
6.	"Jauh"	Sindhu Bharata	4:00
7.	"Without You"	Afgan, Inu Numata, Mhala Numata	3:33
8.	"Demi Kamu dan Aku" (feat. Sherina)	Sherina	4:11
9.	"Tanpa Bahasa"	Aldi Nada Permana	3:30
10.	"Untukmu Aku Bertahan"	David Noah	4:12
Total length:			40:20

== Certifications ==
Region	Certification	Certified units/sales
Indonesia "Multi" Platinum	Platinum	500,000
