= Confession No.1 =

Studio album by Afgan
- Released: April 1, 2008
- Recorded: 2008
- Genre: Pop
- Length: 50:30
- Language: Bahasa Indonesia
- Label: Sony BMG Music Entertainment Indonesia

Afgan chronology
Confession No.1 (2008)	Bersihkan Dirimu (2009)

Singles from Confession No.1
- 1. "Terima Kasih Cinta"; 2. "Sadis"; 3. "Entah"; 4. "Tanpa Batas Waktu"; 5. "Hanya Ada Satu"; 6. "Betapa Kucinta Padamu"

Confession No.1 is the debut studio album by Indonesian singer Afgan. It was released on April 1, 2008. In the album, the singer is joined by musicians Fajar PJ Maringka (Fajar "Element"), Harry Budiman, Deddy Dhukun, Dian Pernama Poetra, and Bebi Romeo as composer.

The album has 13 songs, including "Terima Kasih Cinta", "Tanpa Batas Waktu", "Sadis", "Betapa Kucinta Padamu", "Hanya Ada Satu", and "My Confession", written by Afgan.

== Track listing ==
No.	Title	Writer(s)	Length
1.	"Tanpa Batas Waktu"	Harry Budiman	4:12
2.	"Terima Kasih Cinta"	Mario Ricardo PU	4:11
3.	"Klise"	Harry Budiman	3:24
4.	"Entah"	Fajar "Element"; Sendy KN	3:59
5.	"Yang Kutahu Cinta Itu Indah (feat. Nagita Slavina)"	Fajar "Element"	4:25
6.	"Hanya Ada Satu"	Dian Pernama Poetra; Deddy Dhukun	3:42
7.	"Betapa Kucinta Padamu"	Deddy Dhukun; Irma SA	3:48
8.	"Sadis"	Bebi Romeo	3:19
9.	"Shanty Lussy"	Dian Pernama Poetra; Deddy Dhukun	4:07
10.	"I.L.U"	Fajar "Element"	4:13
11.	"Hilang Rasa"	Dian Pernama Poetra; Deddy Dhukun	3:04
12.	"Biru"	Dian Pernama Poetra; Deddy Dhukun	4:24
13.	"My Confession"	Afgan; Fajar "Element"	3:36
Total length:			50:30
