= Rossa (singer) =

Indonesian singer and businesswoman

Dato' Sri Rossa SSAP DIMP
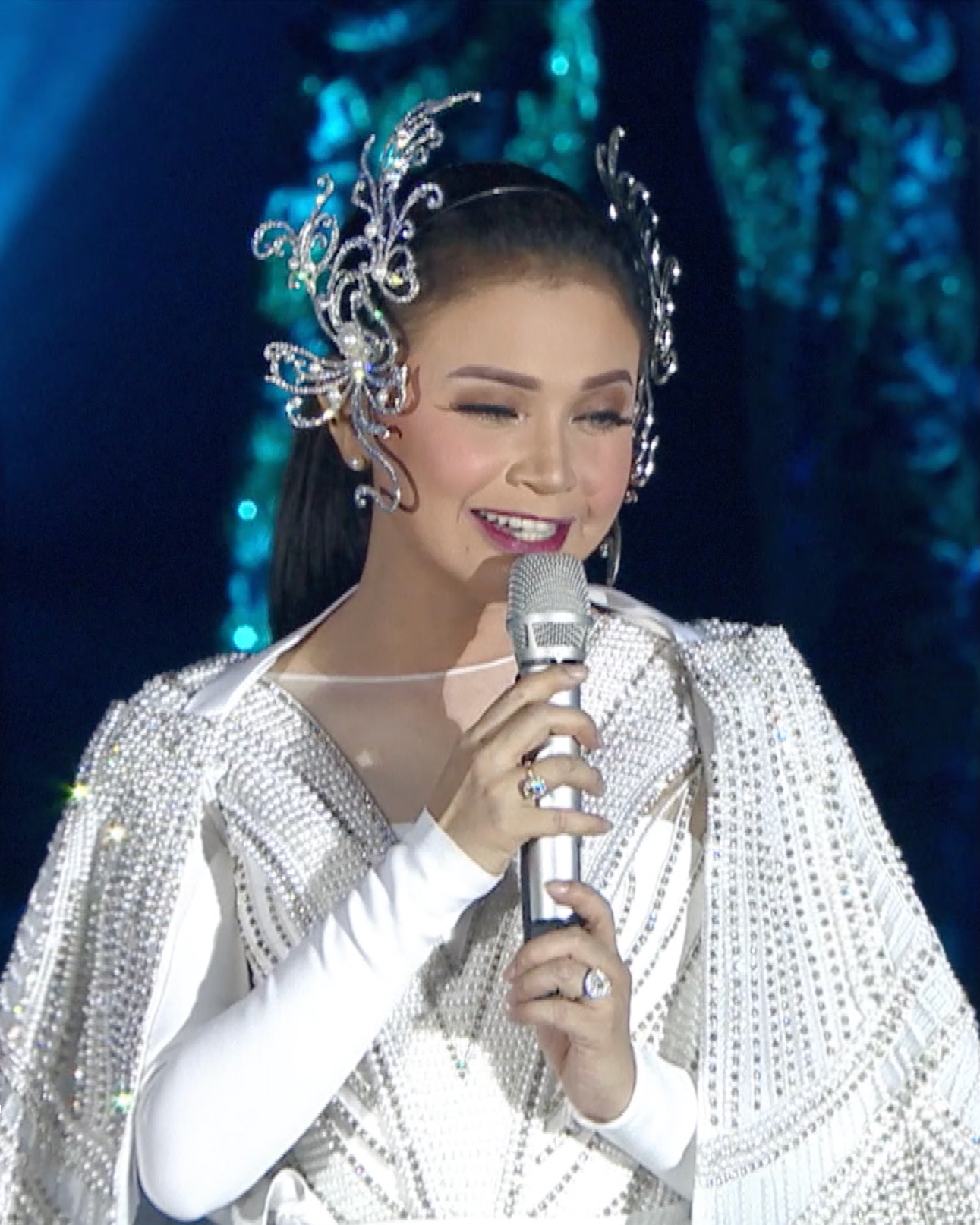
- Rossa while holding the concert "The Journey of 21 Dazzling Years" in 2017
- Born: Sri Rossa Roslaina Handiyani; 9 October 1978 (age 47); Sumedang, West Java, Indonesia
- Education: University of Indonesia
- Occupations: Singer; businesswoman; producer; music executive; actress; presenter; television personality
- Children: 1
- Musical career
- Genres: Pop; R&B; EDM; soul
- Instruments: Vocals; Piano
- Years active: 1988–present
- Labels: SM Entertainment; Inspire Music; Trinity Optima Production; BMG Music
- Website: rossaofficial.com

Sri Rossa Roslaina Handiyani (born 9 October 1978), known professionally as Rossa or Dato' Sri Rossa, is an Indonesian singer, businesswoman, actress, producer, and presenter, widely known as the "Queen of Indonesian Pop". Recognized for her influence in Indonesia and Malay-speaking regions, she is among Indonesia’s best-selling artists of all time, with more than 12 million records sold.

She is the highest-paid Indonesian performers in Malaysia and Singapore. She is also among the highest-paid performers in Indonesia. Since her debut, Rossa has released several commercially successful albums and earned multiple Multi-Platinum and Million-Sales certifications. Her albums have been distributed across Southeast Asia and in Japan since 1999. Her compilation album The Best of Rossa (2011) is ranked third on the list of best-selling albums of all time in Indonesia, with sales of more than 5 million copies. Her album Love, Life & Music (2014) set a record with the Indonesian World Records Museum (MURI) and the Indonesian Recording Industry Association (ASIRI) for selling more than 100,000 CDs in a single day.

She gained wider recognition following the release of A New Chapter (2017). In 2019, she became the first Indonesian and Southeast Asian artist to sign with SM Entertainment. As of 2022, Rossa has received more than 120 awards, making her one of the most awarded singers in the history of Indonesian music. Her songs are frequently used as theme songs for films and television series, with the total exceeding 170 titles. The first instalment of her trilogy album, Another Journey: The Beginning (2023), achieved multi-platinum status, selling over 500,000 copies.

== Life and career ==
=== 1988–2006: Gadis Ingusan – Yang Terpilih ===
Born Sri Rossa Roslaina Handiyani in Sumedang, West Java, Indonesia, she began her musical journey at a young age. Her mother, Eni Kusmiani, is a practitioner of tembang Cianjuran, a traditional Sundanese language vocal art form, which contributed to Rossa's early exposure to music. Rossa has cited her family and Sundanese cultural background as influences on her personal values and musical foundation. Rossa began her singing career as a child performer, appearing alongside established figures in the Indonesian rock scene, including Nicky Astria, Nike Ardilla, Mel Shandy, and Ita Purnamasari. Her vocal abilities attracted early attention, and Betawi cultural figure Benyamin Sueb predicted that she would achieve national and international recognition if she pursued her career in Jakarta. Rossa began her music career at age ten with the release of her debut album Gadis Ingusan (1988). Her second album, Untuk Sahabatku, followed in 1990 under Dian Records/Pro-Sound.

Her breakthrough came with Nada-Nada Cinta (1996), produced by Younky Soewarno. The album sold over 750,000 copies, and Its title track peaked at number two on the all-time MTV Ampuh Indonesia chart and remained at number one for 18 consecutive weeks. During this period, she also appeared in the television series Dua Sisi Mata Uang.

In November 1999, Rossa released her third album, Tegar which earned multiple platinum certifications. She received several awards, including "Favourite Female Artist" at the 2000 MTV Indonesia Awards. In July 2000, she issued Hati Yang Terpilih as a soundtrack album for a television series of the same name.

Rossa completed her studies at the University of Indonesia in February 2002. She released the album Kini on 30 April 2002, featuring contributions from songwriters including Yovie Widianto, Glenn Fredly, and Melly Goeslaw. The album sold over 500,000 copies. She was named the "Best Female Solo Artist" at the 6th Anugerah Musik Indonesia in 2002 for her single "Kini". The album was later reissued with the additional single "Malam Pertama", which also served as a television soundtrack and achieved commercial success. The reissued version received double platinum certification in 2004. Its title track peaked at number third on the all-time MTV Ampuh Indonesia chart and remained at number one for 8 consecutive weeks.

In December 2004, Rossa released Kembali. She was named MTV Malaysia Exclusive Artist in January 2005 and MTV Ampuh Artist of the Month in February 2005. The album was released in Malaysia on 12 May 2005 through Suria Records, accompanied by a promotional concert at Planet Hollywood Kuala Lumpur. She won "Best Female Singer" at the 9th Anugerah Musik Indonesia for the single "Aku Bukan Untukmu" the same year.

In 2005, she contributed to the tribute album From Us to U, performing the song "Cinta" by Titiek Puspa and participating in the collaborative track "Marilah Kemari". She was later nominated for the MTV Asia Awards 2006 in Bangkok as one of Indonesia’s representatives. Rossa released Yang Terpilih in December 2006, featuring the singles "Terlalu Cinta", "Atas Nama Cinta" and "Tak Termiliki". "Atas Nama Cinta" was used as the theme song for the television series Cinta Fitri. The album was released in Malaysia in May 2007.

=== 2007–2012: Ayat-Ayat Cinta – X-Factor Indonesia ===
In December 2007, Rossa released the single "Ayat-Ayat Cinta" written for the film of the same name, which premiered in February 2008. The single became one of the most downloaded songs in Malaysia by an international artist with over 700,000 downloads. During this period, she also performed the songs "Takdir Cinta" and "Tercipta Untukku" with Ungu in Malaysia. In 2008, she appeared as part of the Asian Night segment of the Beijing Olympic Games as the representative of Indonesia.

On 26 November 2008, Rossa held her first major solo concert, Persembahan Cinta, at the Jakarta Convention Center, directed by Jay Subiyakto with musical arrangements by Erwin Gutawa and featuring guest performers including Ungu and Melly Goeslaw. The concert sold out in advance and was later staged in Surabaya and Bandung in 2009, attracted more than 16,000 attendees.

Rossa released her self-titled album ROSSA on 14 January 2009, featuring the singles "Terlanjur Cinta", "Hati Yang Kau Sakiti" and "Tega". To promote the album, she embarked on the Cerita Cinta concert tour across several Indonesian cities, with an additional performance in Kuala Lumpur. The concert attracted more than 31,000 attendees

On 23 May 2010, she staged the Melodi Cinta concert at Stadium Putra Bukit Jalil in Malaysia, attended by more than 12,000 people, with appearances by Ungu, ST12, Aizat, and orchestral direction by Yovie Widianto. The event included participation from the Permata Seni ensembles and was produced by Jay Subiyakto. Media outlets reported that she received a significant performance fee 10 billion rupiah for the concert.

Following the concert, Rossa released the album Harmoni Jalinan Nada & Cerita, which included the singles "Memeluk Bulan", "Jagad Khayalku", and "Ku Menunggu."

Rossa is credited with helping to popularize the use of virtual duets with deceased artists in Indonesian popular music. In 2011, she released a re-recorded version of "Jangan Ada Dusta Diantara Kita" featuring the late Broery Marantika. On 11 October 2011, she performed Harmoni Cinta concert at Esplanade, Singapore, where she introduced the duet single "Aku Bersahaja" with Taufik Batisah. The concert attracted more than 1,800 attendees. Later that year, she released The Best of Rossa, which included new tracks for the Indonesian and international editions. The album reportedly sold more than 5 million copies in Indonesia and ranked third among the country’s best-selling albums of all time. Her collaboration with Joe Flizzow on "One Night Lover" led to an appearance at New York Fashion Week in 2012, and she was featured by the U.S. entertainment website Global Grind. The album was accompanied by several regional and national awards.

In addition to her recording career, Rossa entered the entertainment business sector by establishing Diva Family Karaoke, which grew into one of Indonesia’s larger family karaoke chains. She also served as a judge on the first season of X-Factor Indonesia, where her contestant won the competition.

=== 2013–2016: Salahkah – ILY from 38.000 Ft. ===
Rossa received an honorary title from the Surakarta Palace, "Kanjeng Mas Ayu Tumenggung Sri Rossa Swarakaloka" and was also granted the Malaysian honorific "Dato'" by the Pahang Kingdom. In late 2013, she released the single “Salahkah,” a duet with Malaysian singer Hafiz Suip for the drama Bukan Kerana Aku Cinta. The song earned five nominations at the World Music Awards and was later included on her album Love, Life & Music.

Upon its release in May 2014, the special edition of Love, Life & Music reportedly sold more than 100,000 copies in a day, earning recognition from the Indonesian World Records Museum (MURI) and the Indonesian Recording Industry Association (ASIRI). The standard edition received a triple-platinum certification. The song “Hijrah Cinta” was promoted as the lead single for the Indonesian market and served as the soundtrack for the film of the same name, while “Salahkah” was promoted internationally. Rossa was later awarded an additional honorary title by the Surakarta Palace “Kanjeng Mas Ayu Sri Rossa Swarakaloka,” and returned as a judge on the second season of X-Factor Indonesia, where her contestant again won. The album subsequently received multi-platinum and million-selling certifications in 2015.

Rossa was appointed by Indonesia’s Ministry of Tourism and Creative Economy to perform the jingles “Pesona Indonesia” and “Wonderful Indonesia,” composed by Dwiki Dharmawan, as part of the nation's tourism branding campaign. The promotional materials were broadcast across several regional and international media outlets such as; Astro TV, National Geographic Australia, FX-Australia, Channel News Asia, FOX Channels, CCTV China, CNBC International, Channel 5, Channel 8, Channel U, MBN, MBC, TV3, TBS, TV Asahi Channel 1, Channel 7, Channel 9, Aljazeera, Diva (Asia TV channel), Discovery Channel, Travel Living Channel/AFC, CNN International, BBC World, Sport Channels, Time Square New York and many more.

In 2015, she held a two-night concert at Istana Budaya in Kuala Lumpur titled Malam Keajaiban Cinta Dato’ Rossa, attended by approximately 2,500 people per night. She became the first Indonesian artist to hold two consecutive concert dates at the venue. The concerts reportedly set a record for the highest ticket price at Istana Budaya, with tickets priced at RM1,500. She also performed at the Persada Johor International Convention Centre in Pesona Cinta Dato’ Rossa, attended by 1,800 people.

In early 2016, she participated in the concert Raja & Rakyat Berpisah Tiada at Istana Budaya alongside several Malaysian artists to commemorate the birthday of the Sultan of Pahang. The concert reportedly set a record for the highest ticket price, with tickets priced at RM5,000. That year, she released the single "Jangan Hilangkan Dia" written by Ryan D’Masiv and produced by Tushar Apte. The song was first released in four countries and was ranked number one on "iTunes Soundtrack" for six months. She also performed at the 21st Asian Television Awards in December 2016. In mid-2016, Rossa began recording sessions in Los Angeles for her next studio album with Mitch Allan as vocal producer.

=== 2017–2019: A New Chapter – SM Entertainment ===
On 5 April 2017, Rossa released A New Chapter, an album that introduced electronic and urban pop influences and involved collaborations with several international producers, including Mitch Allan, Tushar Apte, Fiona Bevan, Stuart Crichton, and others. The album contains four English-language tracks and five Indonesian songs. Its lead English single, “Body Speak,” was featured as the MTV Asia Spotlight Artist selection for a month.

To mark her 21st year in the music industry, she staged The Journey of 21 Dazzling Years concert at the Jakarta Convention Center, directed by Jay Subiyakto with musical direction by Tohpati, and attended by about 6,000 people. A New Chapter received a four-times platinum certification in October 2017. That year, she recorded "Bulan Dikekang Malam" as part of the soundtrack for Ayat-Ayat Cinta 2 and held a sold-out concert Journey of 21 Dazzling Years at Esplanade, Singapore.

In early 2018, she released several singles, including "Pernah Memiliki" with D'Masiv and "The Good Is Back" featuring Anggun. She received the 2018 Intellectual Property Award from the Directorate General of Intellectual Property of Indonesia and was named Best Female Singer at the 2018 SCTV Music Awards for "Bulan Dikekang Malam". July 2018, Rossa was announced as one of the performers for the Opening Ceremony of the 2018 Asian Games, and she later joined the judging panel of Indonesian Idol Junior Season 3. She also recorded "HARA – Equilibrium Earth", composed by Melly Goeslaw for a collaboration with WWF Indonesia.

In October 2018, she returned as a judge on Rising Star Indonesia season 3.

On 21 February 2019, Rossa held a press conference in Indonesia announcing a planned collaboration with all members of Super Junior. The event was attended by Leeteuk, Lee Soo-man, and Kim Young-min (businessman). During the announcement, SM Entertainment confirmed that the collaboration was scheduled for release in early 2020. Rossa was also introduced as the first solo artist from Indonesia and Southeast Asia to sign under SM Entertainment's label and management. She later appeared as a guest performer during Super Junior's Super Show 7 World Tour in Jakarta, where she performed "Tegar" with Yesung and Kim Ryeo-wook and sang "Pudar" before an audience of more than 20,000.

In late 2019, Rossa embarked on the Tegar 2.0 concert tour in Jakarta, Bandung, Yogyakarta, and Surabaya to mark the 20th anniversary of her 1999 album Tegar. She also released a new version of the single titled "Tegar 2.0" produced by Ronald Steven with vocal direction by Gamaliel. The tour attracted more than 16,000 attendees.

=== 2020–2023: Masih and Another Journey : The Beginning ===
In March 2020, Rossa released the single "Masih" written by Yovie Widianto and Nino Kayam under her independent label Inspire Music. She first performed the song during her concert The Journey of 21 Dazzling Years at the Jakarta Convention Center. She also produced a short promotional series titled Masih Cinta Terbaik, and collaborated with SM Entertainment actor Ki Do-hoon for the music video.

In 2020, Rossa released a Korean-language version of her song "Hati Yang Kau Sakiti," titled "The Heart You Hurt / Sangcheo Badeun Maeum", which was released on 14 August 2020 alongside a virtual press conference for Southeast Asian and South Korean media. The accompanying music video featured Lee Dong-hae of Super Junior and Indonesian actor Dion Wiyoko. By the end of 2020, several digital music platforms reported that her songs had accumulated significant streaming numbers, making her the most-followed Indonesian artists across major services.

In July 2021, Rossa released the single “Wanita,” composed by Ryan D’Masiv and dedicated to women affected by the COVID-19 pandemic. The release also marked her introduction to Apple Music's Spatial Audio (Dolby Atmos) format in Southeast Asia. In August 2021, Spotify selected her as Indonesia's representative for its "Equal" campaign. Later that year, she released "Terlalu Berharap," written by Andmesh Kamaleng and arranged by Andi Rianto, which was included in the film Love Knots.

In February 2022, Apple Music listed Rossa as the most-streamed Indonesian female artist in the country for January 2022. She subsequently released "Sekali Ini Saja", dedicated to her late colleague Glenn Fredly. To mark her 25-year career, she staged the Rossa 25 Shining Years concert series in Indonesia & Malaysia. The production involved multiple music directors and fashion designers from Indonesia and abroad, including contributions from designers Iris van Herpen and Rick Owens. In Malaysia, the Rossa 25 Shining Years concert reportedly set a record for the highest-priced concert ticket by an Indonesian artist in the country, with RSVP tickets selling for up to RM5,000 and selling out. The concert was attended by approximately 3,000 spectators, including members of Malaysian royalty, business leaders, and fellow artists.

In 2023, Rossa released Another Journey : The Beginning, the first part of her planned trilogy of albums. Self-produced, the album drew inspiration from various generations of pop music. It received commercial certifications shortly after release and topped the iTunes chart in Indonesia. Alongside the album, she released the singles "Bawalah Aku Pergi" and "Khanti" as soundtracks for Viu Indonesia productions, with “Khanti” receiving a National Award for Best Theme Song at the Asian Academy Creative Awards.

Rossa supported the album with a concert tour across Malaysia, Singapore, and Indonesia. Eight months after its release, Another Journey : The Beginning album received additional multi-platinum certifications after surpassing 500,000 copies sold. In Singapore, the concert reportedly set a record as the most-attended performance by an Indonesian solo singer at The Star Theatre, drawing 5,000 attendees. It also reportedly became the most expensive Indonesian concert held in Singapore, with ticket prices reaching SGD 288.

=== 2024–present: All Access To Rossa 25 Shining Years and Asmara Dansa ===
In 2024, Rossa released a documentary titled All Access to Rossa: 25 Shining Years. The film premiered in Indonesian cinemas on 1 August 2024 and was subsequently screened in Malaysia, Brunei Darussalam, and Singapore on 18 October 2024. Produced over three years by Inspire Pictures in collaboration with Time International Films and Sinemaku Pictures, it drew more than 64,000 cinema viewers, becoming the most-watched documentary by an Indonesian solo artist. The film began streaming globally on Netflix on 1 January 2025. For its soundtrack, Rossa recorded a new version of her 1996 single “Nada-Nada Cinta” with Ariel of Noah.

In May and June 2025, Rossa held a concert titled Here I Am at Indonesia Arena in Jakarta, attended by 12,000 people, and at Axiata Arena in Bukit Jalil, Malaysia, by 10,000 attendees. The concerts were noted as a major milestone leading up to her 30th career anniversary in 2026 and featured some of the highest-priced tickets for an Indonesian solo artist at stadium-level venues in both countries: Rp 10000000 in Indonesia and RM5000 in Malaysia.

On 19 October 2025, Rossa released her first EP, Asmara Dansa. The EP serves as a tribute to regional musicians Chrisye and Sheila Majid. She later promoted the release through a roadshow titled Asmara Dansa across several Indonesian cities, attracting more than 17,000 attendees.

== Personal life ==
In 2004, Rossa married Surendro Prasetyo, a member of the band Padi, known as Yoyo. The couple divorced in 2009. They have one son, born in 2006, of whom Rossa was granted custody following the divorce.

== Philanthropy ==
Rossa has been involved in various social and humanitarian initiatives alongside her career in the entertainment industry. She has participated in benefit concerts and fundraising activities for disaster relief, including humanitarian efforts following major natural disasters in Indonesia such as the Aceh tsunami, the Yogyakarta earthquake, the Lombok earthquakes, Gunung Agung Bali eruption, the Palu earthquake and tsunami, covid Indonesia and flood Sumatera.

In addition, she has supported campaigns related to children’s welfare and education, including collaborations with organizations such as UNICEF Indonesia to raise public awareness of issues affecting children. She has also collaborated with Hara in fundraising initiatives benefiting WWF Indonesia, supporting wildlife conservation and environmental sustainability. Her philanthropic engagement is primarily conducted through advocacy, public campaigns, event-based contributions, and charitable foundations.

Rossa has served as a brand ambassador for several social and humanitarian organizations, including Dompet Dhuafa (2012–2015) and Yayasan Kanker Indonesia through its Pink Ribbon campaign (2015–present), as well as Indonesia’s National Anti-Narcotics campaign (2015–present). She has also been appointed as an international brand ambassador for Wonderful Indonesia and Pesona Indonesia (2015–present), and as a goodwill ambassador for the Ministry of Environment and Forestry (2018–2020). In 2021, she was named an SDGs village ambassador in Sumedang, West Java.

Since 2004, she has additionally been involved in charitable activities supporting cancer foundations, hospital development, and educational initiatives in Malaysia and Singapore.

== Awards and honors ==
Throughout her career, Rossa has received more than 120 national & international music awards. Rossa won "Best Progressive Pop Female Solo Artist" at the 2001 Anugerah Musik Indonesia. She was named the "Best Female Solo Artist" at the 6th Anugerah Musik Indonesia in 2002 for her single "Kini".

Rossa's 2007 single "Ayat-Ayat Cinta" received several awards, including Best Female Singer at the 11th Anugerah Musik Indonesia, Most Favorite Female Singer from SWA magazine, and Most Popular Singer at the SCTV Awards. In 2008, she won an Anugerah Industri Muzik award for Best Malay Song Performed by a Foreign Artist for her single "Terlalu Cinta". In 2009, she won the Best Malay Song Performed by a Foreign Artist award at the 16th Anugerah Industri Muzik for the single "Ayat-Ayat Cinta".

For her album Harmoni Jalinan Nada & Cerita, Rossa won the Most Favorite Female Artist award from Halo Selebriti, Best Malay Song Performed by a Foreign Artist at the 18th Anugerah Industri Muzik for "Ku Menunggu" and Best Female Singer at the 10th Anugerah Planet Muzik.

In 2015, Rossa was granted the honorary title Dato' by the Pahang royal family in Malaysia. She has been described by regional media as the "Queen of Indonesian Pop". Rossa received the "Planet Music Special Award (Legend Award)" at the 2018 Anugerah Planet Muzik, and was the first Indonesian artist to receive the distinction. In October 2018, she was awarded the Darjah Sri Sultan Ahmad Shah Pahang (SSAP), conferring the title Dato' Sri, and later received the Best Indonesian Artist award at the 2018 Big Apple Music Awards, USA. She was also appointed as a brand ambassador for Indonesia's Ministry of Environment and Forestry.

In 2022, Rossa marked 25 years in the music industry with the 25 Shining Years concert tour, followed by the 2024 documentary film All Access to Rossa 25 Shining Years. In 2025, she received the Pop Icon honor from TVRI and the Asia Legendary Music Icon Award from the Top 10 Asia Artist Awards, becoming the first Indonesian artist to receive these distinctions.

== Discography ==
Studio albums

- Nada-Nada Cinta (1996)
- Tegar (1999)
- Hati Yang Terpilih (2000)
- Kini (2002)
- Kembali (2004)
- Yang Terpilih (2006)
- Rossa (2009)

- Harmoni Jalinan Nada & Cerita (2010)
- The Best of Rossa (2011)
- Platinum Collection (2013)
- Love, Life and Music (2014)
- A New Chapter (2017)
- Another Journey: The Beginning (2023)

== Concerts ==
Rossa has held numerous concerts throughout her career, both domestically in Indonesia and internationally across Southeast Asia. The table below lists major solo concerts and notable performances, along with reliable sources.

=== Solo concerts and tour ===
Year	Concert	Location	Notes	Source
2008-2009	Persembahan Cinta (tour)	Jakarta, Bandung, Surabaya (Indonesia)	Her first solo concert and tour drew over 16,000 spectators.	
2009	Cerita Cinta (tour)	Indonesia & Malaysia	The concert tour, held to promote her self-titled album Rossa, visited seven cities in Indonesia and one in Malaysia, drawing over 31,000 spectators.	
2010	Melodi Cinta	Axiata Arena, Kuala Lumpur, Malaysia	One of Rossa’s largest solo concerts outside Indonesia with over 12,000 spectators.	
2011	Harmoni Cinta	Esplanade, Singapore	Her first solo concert at the Esplanade in Singapore to promote her album Harmoni Jalinan Nada dan Cerita, drawing over 1,800 spectators.	
2015	Malam Keajaiban Cinta Dato Rossa	Istana Budaya, Malaysia	The first Indonesian female artist to hold a multi-night solo concert at a prestigious Malaysian venue, selling tickets at up to RM 1,500 and drawing 2,000 spectators.	
2015	Pesona Cinta Dato Rossa	Persada Johor International Convention Centre, Malaysia	Solo concert in Johor Bahru following Malam Keajaiban Cinta, which drew 1,800 spectators.	
2017	The Journey of 21 Dazzling Years	Jakarta (JCC) & Singapore (Espalande)	Career anniversary concert celebrating 21 years in music, and drawing 7,800 spectators.	
2019	Tegar 2.0 (tour)	Indonesia	Anniversary concert celebrating the 20th anniversary of her single Tegar (1999), which drew 16,000 spectators across four cities.	
2022	Rossa 25 Shining Years Concert (tour)	Indonesia & Malaysia	Concert tour celebrating the 25th anniversary of her career, performing in multiple cities, including Malaysia. The tour set a record for the most expensive tickets for an Indonesian artist in Malaysia at RM 5,000 and drew 50,000 spectators.	
2023	Another Journey : The Beginning (tour)	Indonesia, Malaysia, Singapore	concert tour to promote her album Another Journey : The Beginning, including her first major solo concert in Samarinda. The tour also set records for the largest and most expensive solo concerts by an Indonesian singer in Singapore, with 5,000 spectators and tickets priced at 288 SGD, and in Kinabalu, Malaysia, with 4,000 spectators and tickets at RM 1,688.	
2025	Here I Am	Jakarta (Indonesia Arena) & Malaysia (Axiata Arena)	Major solo concert featuring an immersive production as part of her ongoing career legacy. The concerts set records for the most expensive solo artist tickets in stadiums, drawing 12,000 spectators in Indonesia with tickets priced at Rp 10 million, and 10,000 spectators in Malaysia with tickets at RM 5,000.	
2025	Asmara Dansa (tour)	Indonesia	The concert tour, held to promote her first EP album Asmara Dansa, visited four cities in Indonesia and drawing over 17,000 spectators.	

=== Exclusive concerts ===
Year	Concert	Location	Notes	Source
2011	An Evening With Rossa	Malaysia	She performed at a mini concert at Tropicana Golf & Country Resort in Kuala Lumpur on 9 and 10 June to promote her album Harmoni Jalinan Nada & Cerita.	
2012	One Night Lover with Rossa	Indonesia	Valentine’s Day special concert in Semarang on February 14 to promote her album The Best of Rossa, which drew 1,800 spectators.	
2013	Konsert Nusantara	Malaysia	Special concert at Istana Budaya in Kuala Lumpur from 7 to 9 March to celebrate shared regional culture, drawing 6,000 spectators.	
2014	Malam Gala Cinta Tanpa Sempadan Exclusive With Dato' Rossa	Malaysia	Exclusive Rossa's concert at Royal Chulan Kuala Lumpur on February 14, which was organized to raise funds for the Malaysian HIV/AIDS children’s shelter Persatuan Kebajikan Anak Pesakit HIV / AIDS Nurul Iman Malaysia (PERNIM), which drew 1,500 spectators.	
2014	Atas Nama Cinta Dato' Rossa - Tribute to Secretaries	Malaysia	Exclusive Rossa's concert at Royal Chulan Kuala Lumpur on April 9, Mutiara Ballroom, which drew 1,200 spectators.	
2016	Raja & Rakyat Berpisah Tiada	Malaysia	Special concert commemorating the birthday of the Sultan of Pahang at Istana Budaya on 27 February in Kuala Lumpur, setting a record for the most expensive concert tickets at the venue, priced at RM 5,000, which drew 2,000 spectators.	
2017	A New Chapter	Indonesia	Exclusive New Year’s celebration concert in Bali to promote her album A New Chapter.	
2018	Rossa & Cakra Khan Intimate Concert	Indonesia	Special valentine concert in The Pallas, Jakarta, which drew 2,000 spectators	
2018	Grand Fantasia	Indonesia	A new year celebration exclusive concert in Sheraton Grand Jakarta Gandaria City, which drew 2,000 spectators.	
2019	Rossa Live in Concert - Cinta Dalam Hidupku	Indonesia	Special valentine concert in The Pallas, Jakarta, which drew 2,000 spectators	
2019	New Year's Eve Celebration With Rossa & Kahitna	Indonesia	A new year celebration exclusive concert in Trans Studio Bandung, which drew 3,000 spectators.	
2025	Asmara Dansa - The Dance of Love	Indonesia	Exclusive New Year’s celebration concert in Central Java to promote her album Asmara Dansa.	

=== Television concerts ===
Year	Concert	Location	Notes	Source
2005	Stars On Stage "Special Rossa	Indonesia	The concert broadcast on ANTV.	
2005	By Request Special : Rossa - Kembali	Indonesia	The concert broadcast on SCTV.	
2005	Class On Campus : Special Rossa	Indonesia	The concert broadcast on ANTV.	
2006	Platinum Muzik : Spesial Rossa	Malaysia	The concert broadcast on ASTRO.	
2006	Class On Air "Spesial Rossa	Indonesia	The concert broadcast on ANTV.	
2006	Musik Asyik Spesial : Nada-Nada Cinta Terpilih Rossa	Indonesia	The concert broadcast on ANTV.	
2007	Nite of Soulful Stars : Spesial Rossa	Malaysia	The concert broadcast on NTV7.	
2008	Persembahan Cinta (TV Version)	Indonesia & Malaysia	The concert broadcast on SCTV & TV3.	
2009	By Request : Spesial Rossa (Self-Titled Rossa)	Indonesia	The concert broadcast on SCTV.	
2010	Melodi Cinta (TV Version)	Indonesia & Malaysia	The concert broadcast on TRANS TV & TV3.	
2010	Atas Nama Cinta	Malaysia	The concert broadcast on ASTRO.	
2011	Harmoni Cinta (TV Version)	Indonesia & Singapore	The concert broadcast on ANTV & MEDIACORP SURIA.	
2013	K-20 : Special Rossa	Indonesia	The concert broadcast on KOMPAS TV.	
2015	Malam Keajaiban Cinta Dato’ Rossa (TV Version)	Malaysia	The concert broadcast on TV3.	
2017	The Journey of 21 Dazzling Years (TV Version)	Indonesia	The concert broadcast on TRANS TV.	
2020	Suara Hati Istri	Indonesia	The concert broadcast on INDOSIAR.	
2020	Hijrah Cinta Rossa & Lesti	Indonesia	The concert broadcast on INDOSIAR.	
2020	Konser Galau - Rossa & Nagita Slavina (TV Version)	Indonesia	The concert broadcast on ANTV.	
2021	Afgan Rossa The Concert (TV Version)	Indonesia	The concert broadcast on ANTV.	
2021	25 Tahun Rossa	Indonesia	The concert broadcast on RCTI.	
2022	Rossa 25 Shining Years (TV Version)	Indonesia	The concert broadcast on RCTI.	

=== Live streaming concerts ===
Year	Concert	Location	Notes	Source
2020	Tegar 2.0 (Jakarta & Bandung)	Indonesia	The concert was aired on tiket.com.	
2020	Galau Rossa & Nagita Slavina	Indonesia	The concert was aired on tiket.com.	
2021	Afgan Rossa The Concert	Indonesia	The concert was aired on tiket.com.	
2023	Pop Heart Festival – Afgan Rossa The Concert	Indonesia	The concert was aired on YouTube Cadburry	

== Filmography ==
=== Web series ===
List of web series
Year	Title	Role(s)	Notes	Ref(s)
2020	Masih (Cinta) Terbaik	Rossa	also executive producer	

=== Films ===
List of films
Year	Title	Role(s)	Notes	Ref(s)
2021	Love Knots	Rossa	also executive producer	
2023	All Access To Rossa 25 Shining Years	Rossa	also executive producer	
2025	Tak Ingin Usai di Sini	Rossa	also main performed the original soundtrack	

=== Soap operas ===
List of soap operas
Year	Title	Role(s)	Notes	Ref(s)
1996-1997	Dua Sisi Mata Uang	Imah	The soap opera broadcast on RCTI.	
2001-2002	Perisai Kasih	Bunga	The soap opera broadcast on SCTV.	

=== Television show franchises ===
Lists of reality television show franchises
Year	Title	Role(s)	Notes	Ref(s)
2008	Superstar Show	Judge	Guest in Grand Final	
2010	Indonesian Idol season 6	Judge	Main judge	
2013	X Factor Indonesia season 1	Judge	Winner judge	
2014	Mamamia Show season 4	Judge	Guest	
2014	Rising Star Indonesia (season 1)	Judge	Guest	
2015	X Factor Indonesia season 2	Judge	Winner judge	
2016-2017	Rising Star Indonesia season 2	Judge	Main judge	
2017	Juara 3 Juara - Malaysia	Judge	Winner judge category Balada	
2018	Indonesian Idol Junior season 3	Judge	Main judge	
2018-2019	Rising Star Indonesia season 3	Judge	Main judge	
2019	D'Star Indonesia	Judge	Guest	
2019	Byarr Indonesia	Judge	Grand Final	
2020	Indonesian Idol season 10	Judge	Guest	
2020-2021	Indonesian Idol season 11	Judge	Main judge	
2022-2023	X Factor Indonesia season 3	Judge	Main judge	
2022	Tik-Tok Award Indonesia 2021	Judge	1 episode	
2022	Indonesia's Got Talent season 3	Judge	Main judge	
2022	The Indonesian Next Big Star	Judge	Guest	
2022-2023	Indonesian Idol season 12	Judge	Guest	
2023	Indonesia's Got Talent season 4	Judge	Main judge	
2023	Big Stage (Season 5) - Malaysia	Judge	Guest	
2023	The Indonesian Next Big Star season 2	Judge	Main judge	
2024-2025	Indonesian Idol season 13	Judge	Main judge	
2025-2026	Indonesian Idol season 14	Judge	Main judge	

=== Television programs ===
List of television programs
Year	Title	Role(s)	Notes	Ref(s)
2016-2017	A Night to Remember	Rossa	also host	

=== Television series by network ===
Lists of television series by network
Year	Title	Role(s)	Notes	Ref(s)
2020-2022	Bisik (Bincang Musik) With Rossa	Rossa	also host and aired on Vidiocom & Langit Musik	
2016-2017	Rossa Drama Corner	Rossa	also host and aired on Viu Indonesia	

== Cited sources ==
- Alvin, Just (2013). The story book of Just Alvin 2. GagasMedia. ISBN 979-780-674-X.
- Gunawan, Ivan (2015). Ivan Gunawan, "Aku Berkarya Dengan Cinta". PT Mizan Publika. ISBN 9786020322018.
- Davonar, Agnes (2018). Story of Bennu Sorumba, "Sleeping Beauty". PT Elex Komputindo, Gramedia Jakarta. ISBN 978-602-04-5465-8.
