= List of awards and nominations received by Fatin Shidqia =

Fatin Shidqia awards and nominations
Awards and nominations
Award	Wins	Nominations
Anugerah Musik Indonesia	5	7
Anugerah Planet Muzik	2	3
Bintang RPTI Awards	2	2
Daf BAMA Music Awards	1	5
Dahsyatnya Awards	3	6
Expose Awards	4	4
Global Seru Awards	0	2
Hai Reader's Poll Music Awards	1	4
Inbox Awards	2	9
Indonesian Choice Awards	1	2
Infotainment Awards	0	1
Nickelodeon Indonesia Kids' Choice Awards	2	2
SCTV Awards	1	2
SCTV Music Awards	0	5
World Music Awards	1	4
Yahoo! OMG Awards	1	1

Totals (Note: Certain award groups do not simply award one winner. They acknowledge several different recipients, have runners-up, and have third place. Since this is a specific recognition and is different from losing an award, runner-up mentions are considered wins in this award tally. For simplification and to avoid errors, each award in this list has been presumed to have had a prior nomination.)
- Wins: 30
- Nominations: 65

Fatin Shidqia is an Indonesian singer and actress. This is a list of awards received by Fatin Shidqia.

== Anugerah Musik Indonesia ==
The Anugerah Musik Indonesia (English translation: Indonesian Music Awards), is an annual Indonesian major music awards. They have been compared to the American Grammy Awards and British Brit Awards. The award was formalized in 1997 by ASIRI (Association of Indonesia Recording Industry), PAPPRI (Association of Indonesian Singers, Songwriters and Music Record Producers), and KCI (Copyright Office of Indonesia). Fatin received five awards from seven nominations.

Year	Nominee / work	Award	Result	Ref.
2014	"Aku Memilih Setia"	Best Pop Female Solo Artist	Won	
2014	"Aku Memilih Setia"	Best of the Best Newcomer	Won	
2014	For You	Best Pop/Urban Album	Won	
2014	For You	Best of the Best Album	Won	
2015	"Demi Cintaku"	Best Pop Female Solo Artist	Nominated	
2017	"Ketika Tangan dan Kaki Berkata"	Best Islamic Spiritual-Lyric Production Work	Won	
2019	"Jingga"	Best Pop Female Solo Artist	Nominated	

== Anugerah Planet Muzik ==
The Anugerah Planet Muzik (English translation: Planet Music Awards), was an annual awards given to most popular artists from Indonesia, Singapore, and Malaysia. Fatin received two awards from 3 nominations.

Year	Nominee / work	Award	Result	Ref.
2014	"Aku Memilih Setia"	Best Newcomer Female Artist	Nominated	
2014	"Dia Dia Dia"	APM Most Popular Song	Won	
2015	Fatin Shidqia	APM Most Popular Artist	Won	

== Bintang RPTI Awards ==
Year	Nominee / work	Award	Result	Ref.
2013	Fatin Shidqia	Celebrity Top Rating of the Year	Won	—
2014	Fatin Shidqia	Celebrity Top Rating of the Year	Won	—

== Cinemags Reader's Choice Awards ==
Year	Nominee / work	Award	Result	Ref.
2014	"Cahaya Di Langit Itu" (99 Cahaya di Langit Eropa)	Favorite Soundtrack	Won	

== Daf BAMA Music Awards ==
The Daf BAMA Music Awards are awards to honor artists who have spread their charms, breaking the boundary between the countries and also shall immortalize creativity among the global music lovers till the end of time. Fatin received one award from 5 nominations.

Year	Nominee / work	Award	Result	Ref.
2016	Fatin Shidqia	Best Asian New Female Act	Won	
2016	Fatin Shidqia	Best New Act	Nominated	
2016	Fatin Shidqia	People's Choice Award	Nominated	
2017	Fatin Shidqia	People's Choice Award	Nominated	
2017	Fatin Shidqia	Best Rising Act	Nominated	

== Dahsyatnya Awards ==
The Dahsyatnya Awards are annual awards presented by the daily Indonesian TV show Dahsyat that airs on RCTI. Fatin received three awards from 6 nominations.

Year	Nominee / work	Award	Result	Ref.
2014	"Aku Memilih Setia"	Outstanding Song	Nominated	
2014	Fatin Shidqia	Outstanding Newcomer	Won	
2015	Fatin Shidqia	Outstanding Female Solo Singer	Won	
2015	"Kamulah Kamuku" (feat. The Overtunes)	Outstanding Duet/Collaboration	Won	
2015	"Kamulah Kamuku" (feat. The Overtunes)	Outstanding Song	Nominated	
2016	Fatin Shidqia	Outstanding Female Solo Singer	Nominated	

== Expose Awards ==
Year	Nominee / work	Award	Result	Ref.
2013	Fatin Shidqia	Celeb of the Year	Won	—
2013	Fatin Shidqia	Female Singer of the Year	Won	—
2013	Fatin Shidqia	Newcomer of the Year	Won	—
2013	"Aku Memilih Setia"	Song of the Year	Won	—

== Fokus Selebriti Awards ==
Year	Nominee / work	Award	Result	Ref.
2013	Fatin Shidqia	Focused Female Celebrity	Nominated	—

== Global Seru Awards ==
The Global Seru Awards are awarded to celebrities who have caught the attention of the public through interesting or exciting accomplishments.

Year	Nominee / work	Award	Result	Ref.
2014	Fatin Shidqia	Most Exciting Newcomer	Nominated	
2014	"Aku Memilih Setia"	Most Exciting Song	Nominated	

== Hai Reader's Poll Music Awards ==
Created by online magazine Hai, the Hai Reader's Poll Music Awards are an awards to honour talent in popular music. The awards have been used by online voting. Fatin received one award from 4 nominations.

Year	Nominee / work	Award	Result	Ref.
2013	Fatin Shidqia	The Best Freshmeat	Nominated	
2013	Fatin Shidqia	The Best Female	Nominated	
2014	Fatin Shidqia	The Best Female	Won	
2015	Fatin Shidqia	The Best Female	Nominated	

== I-Cinema Awards ==
Year	Nominee / work	Award	Result	Ref.
2016	Dreams	Favorite Newcomer Role	Nominated	—

== Inbox Awards ==
The Inbox Awards are awarded to recognize talent in music and entertainment. The awards were launched in 2008 and presented by Indonesian television show Inbox which aired on SCTV. Fatin received two awards from 9 nominations.

Year	Nominee / work	Award	Result	Ref.
2014	"Aku Memilih Setia"	Most Inbox Song	Nominated	
2014	Fatinistic	Most Inbox Fanbase	Nominated	
2014	Fatin Shidqia	Most Inbox Female Solo Singer	Won	
2015	Fatin Shidqia	Most Inbox Female Solo Singer	Nominated	
2015	Fatin Shidqia	Most Inbox Darling Social Media Artist	Nominated	
2015	Fatinistic	Most Inbox Fanbase	Nominated	
2016	Fatinistic	Most Inbox Fanbase	Nominated	
2016	Fatin Shidqia	Most Inbox Female Solo Singer	Won	
2016	"Away"	Most Inbox Song	Nominated	

== Indonesian Social Media Awards ==
The Indonesian Social Media Awards were presented by SCTV for award to celebrities who had become a trending topic in each social media, such as Twitter, Facebook and Instagram.

Year	Nominee / work	Award	Result	Ref.
2016	Fatin Shidqia	Female Celeb Facebook	Nominated	

== Indonesian Choice Awards ==
The Indonesian Choice Awards are awards given by the Indonesian television station NET. Fatin received one award from 2 nominations.

Year	Nominee / work	Award	Result	Ref.
2014	Fatin Shidqia	Breakthrough Artist of the Year	Won	
2016	Fatin Shidqia	Female Singer of the Year	Nominated	

== Infotainment Awards ==
The Infotainment Awards are an awards ceremony were presented by SCTV and established since 2012, to awarded for celebrity whom to be appreciated in entertainment.

Year	Nominee / work	Award	Result	Ref.
2015	Fatin Shidqia	Most Exist Celebrity Social Media	Nominated	

== Mom & Kids Awards ==
First established in MNCTV on 2016, the Mom & Kids Awards are an awards were given as appreciate and inspiration for mother and kids. Fatin received one award.

Year	Nominee / work	Award	Result	Ref.
2015	Fatin Shidqia	Favorite Female Singer	Won	

== Nickelodeon Indonesia Kids' Choice Awards ==
The Nickelodeon Indonesia Kids' Choice Awards is the Indonesian version of Nickelodeon Kids' Choice Awards, held since 2008 in Jakarta. Fatin received two awards.

Year	Nominee / work	Award	Result	Ref.
2014	Fatin Shidqia	Favorite Solo Singer	Won	
2014	Fatin Shidqia	Slime Star	Won	

== SCTV Awards ==
The SCTV Awards is an award given by the Indonesian television station SCTV, based on the audience's votes. Fatin received one award from 2 nominations.

Year	Nominee / work	Award	Result	Ref.
2014	Fatin Shidqia	Famous Singer	Nominated	
2015	"Jangan Kau Bohong" (for High School Love Story)	Famous Soap Opera Soundtrack	Won	

== SCTV Music Awards ==
The SCTV Music Awards is an annual awards for Indonesian musician and held by Indonesian television station, SCTV, since 2003. The event given some awards, who the winner selected based on voting public through SMS.

Year	Nominee / work	Award	Result	Ref.
2015	Fatin Shidqia	Most Famous Female Solo Singer	Nominated	
2016	Fatin Shidqia	Most Famous Female Solo Singer	Nominated	
2016	"Away"	Most Famous Video Clip	Nominated	
2017	Fatin Shidqia	Most Famous Female Solo Singer	Nominated	
2018	Fatin Shidqia	Most Famous Female Solo Singer	Pending	

== World Music Awards ==
The World Music Awards is an international awards show founded in 1989 under the patronage of Albert II, Prince of Monaco and based in Monte Carlo. Awards are presented to the world's best selling artist in various categories and to the best-selling artist from each major territory. Sales figures are provided by the International Federation of the Phonographic Industry. Fatin received one award from 4 nominations.

Year	Nominee / work	Award	Result	Ref.
2014	Fatin Shidqia	World's Best Female Artist	Nominated	
2014	Fatin Shidqia	World's Best Live Act	Nominated	
2014	Fatin Shidqia	World's Best Entertainer of the Year	Nominated	
2014	Fatin Shidqia	World's Best Indonesian Female Artist (Voted)	Won	

== Yahoo! OMG Awards ==
The Yahoo! OMG Awards are presented annually since 2012 by Yahoo! Indonesia for celebrities in music, film and news. Based on voted by fans in Yahoo! websites. Fatin received one award.

Year	Nominee / work	Award	Result	Ref.
2013	Fatin Shidqia	Rising Star of the Year	Won	
