= 17th Annual Anugerah Musik Indonesia =

Annual Anugerah Musik Indonesia
- Date: June 19, 2014
- Location: Kasablanka Hall, Tebet, South Jakarta
- Country: Indonesia
- Hosted by: Raffi Ahmad; Robby Purba

Highlights
- Most awards: Fatin Shidqia (5)
- Most nominations: Fatin Shidqia (8)

Television/radio coverage
- Network: RCTI
- Runtime: 180 minutes

The 17th Annual Anugerah Musik Indonesia was held on June 19, 2014, at the Kasablanka Hall in Tebet, South Jakarta. The show was broadcast live on RCTI and was hosted by Raffi Ahmad and Robby Purba. The show was a collaboration between Anugerah Musik Indonesia Foundation and RCTI.

Awards were presented in 48 categories in nine genres of music: Pop and Urban, Rock and Metal, Jazz and Instrumental, Kroncong and Kroncong Contemporary/Style/Opera, Dangdut, children's songs, production work, production support, and general. The event was divided into three segments: AMI Awards Gala Night, Lifetime Achievement Awards, and The Winner's Concert.

Fatin Shidqia led the nominations with eight, and became the biggest winner of the night with five wins, including Best of the Best Album for For You, Best of the Best Newcomer, and Best Pop Female Solo Artist. Other winners included Geisha, who won in four categories, Coboy Junior, who earning three awards and Ayu Ting Ting, Judika & Duma, etc. took home two trophies each.

Violinist Idris Sardi received the "AMI Legend Awards" for his contributions to Indonesian music. His daughter, Santi Sardi, accepted the award on his behalf.

== Performers ==
Artist(s)	Song(s)
Main show
Gita Gutawa; Sophia Latjuba; Andien	"Harmoni Cinta" "Tiada Kata" "Moving On"
Andien; Joey Alexander	"Kasih Putih"
Bagas; Difa; Chelsea; Sensen; Rafi; Noni	"Bermain Musik" "Aku Suka Musik"
JKT48	"River"
Cakra Khan; BUBU 'Bubugiri'; Citra Scholastika; Andien (saxophone)	"Minyak Wangi" "Buka Dikit Joss"
Kristina; Zaskia Gotik; Nassar; Ayu Ting Ting	"Lumpuhkan Ingatanku" "Katakan Tidak"
Tulus	"Sepatu"
Virzha; Sophia Latjuba	"Kangen"
Repvblik; Fatin Shidqia	"Sandiwara Cinta" "Aku Memilih Setia"
Bunga Citra Lestari	"Kuasa-Mu"
Kevin Aprilio; Pasha; Masha; Stephanie Poetri; Nadine Woworuntu	"Bintang-Bintang" "Astaga"
Iwa K Bastian Steel; Nowela Idol; Daffa	"Could It Be" "Malam Ini Indah"
Nicky Astria; Husein Idol; Ian Antono	"I Love You Babe" "Jangan Ada Angkara"
Syahrini; Nia Daniaty; Geisha	"Sandiwara Cinta" "Cinta dan Benci" "Gelas-Gelas Kaca"
Maylaffayza; Ava	"Pengantin Remaja" (Violin version) "Dealova" (Violin version)
Superman Is Dead; Virzha	"Jadilah Legenda"
SixString	"Bendera"
Angel Pieters	"Terburu Cinta"

== Presenters ==
- Stephanie Poetri and Nadine Waworuntu – Presented Best of the Best Newcomer
- Angel Pieters, Bastian and Tasya Kamila – Presented Best Children Duo/Group/Vocal Group
- Tulus and Bunga Citra Lestari – Presented Best Pop Duo/Group
- Syahrini and Ayu Ting Ting – Presented Best Reggae/Ska/Dub Production Work
- Sophia Latjuba and Superman Is Dead – Presented Best Pop Female Solo Artist
- Thomas Djorghi and Nassar – Presented Best Contemporary Dangdut Female Solo Artist
- Nisa – Presented Best R&B/Soul Production Work
- Ian Antono and Nicky Astria – Presented Best Rock Duo/Group
- Tantowi Yahya – Presented AMI Legend Awards
- Dewa Budjana, Tohpati, Baim, Eross Chandra, Baron and Andre Dinuth – Presented Best of the Best Album
- Gita Gutawa and Kevin Aprilio – Presented Best of the Best Production Work

== Nominees and winners ==
The nominees were announced on May 31, 2014. Winners are listed first and highlighted in boldface.

=== Pop/Urban ===
**Best Pop Female Solo Artist**: **Fatin Shidqia – "Aku Memilih Setia"**; Andien – "Bernyanyi Untukmu"; Astrid – "Terpukau"; Bunga Citra Lestari – "Jangan Gila"; Raisa – "Pemeran Utama"; Syahrini – "Semua Karena Cinta"	**Best Pop Male Solo Artist**: **Iwan Fals – "Raya"**; Afgan – "Jodoh Pasti Bertemu"; Cakra Khan – "Setelah Kau Tiada"; Marcell – "Demi Waktu"; Vidi Aldiano – "Pupus/Kasih Tak Sampai (mash up)"
**Best Pop Duo/Group**: **Geisha – "Lumpuhkan Ingatanku"**; 3Composer – "Pemberi Harapan Palsu"; D'Masiv – "Diam Tanpa Kata"; Duo Maia – "Berdua"; Samsons – "Di Ujung Jalan"	**Best Urban Male/Female Solo Artist**: **Citra Scholastika – "Berlian"**; Matthew Sayaersz – "Sempurna Hidupku"; Rieka Roeslan – "Misteri Cinta"; Sherina – "Akan Ku Tunggu"; Tasya Kamila – "Bagiku"
**Best Urban Duo/Group**: **Maliq & D'Essentials – "Setapak Sriwedari"**; Bonita & The Hus Band – "Bangun"; Pandai Besi – "Hujan Jangan Marah"; Soulvibe – "Gerangan Cinta"; The Groove – "Kusambut Hadirmu"	**Best Pop/Urban Collaboration**: **Judika & Duma – "Sampai Akhir"**; Bebi Romeo (featuring Rossa) – "Bukan Cinta Biasa"; Citra Scholastika (featuring Piyu) – "Alasan Terbesar"; Piyu (featuring The Frontmen) – "Hancur"; Sherina (featuring Vidi Aldiano) – "Apakah Ku Jatuh Cinta"; The Rain (featuring Endank Soekamti) – "Terlatih Patah Hati"
**Best Pop/Urban Vocal Group**: **Project Pop – "Gara-Gara Kahitna"**; 7icons – "Cinta 7 Susun"; Cherrybelle – "Diam–Diam Suka"; Coboy Junior – "Ngaca Dulu Deh"; JKT48 – "River"; Raihan – "Hari Raya Untuk Semua"	**Best Pop/Urban Songwriter**: **Roby Geisha – "Lumpuhkan Ingatanku" (performed by Geisha)**; Bemby Noor, Mario Kacang and Tengku Shafick – "Pemberi Harapan Palsu" (performed by 3Composer); Bemby Noor – "Jodoh Pasti Bertemu" (performed by Afgan); Ade Govinda – "Terpukau" (performed by Astrid); Muhammad Fredy Harahap – "Aku Memilih Setia" (performed by Fatin Shidqia); Piyu – "Hancur" (performed by Piyu (featuring The Frontmen))
**Best Pop/Urban Recording Producer**: **Noey – "Lumpuhkan Ingatanku" (performed by Geisha)**; Irwan Simanjuntak – "Jodoh Pasti Bertemu" (performed by Afgan); Takaeda – "Aku Memilih Setia" (performed by Fatin Shidqia); Piyu – "Hancur" (performed by Piyu (featuring The Frontmen)); Astono Handoko and Ramadhan Handyanto – "Pemeran Utama" (performed by Raisa)	**Best Pop/Urban Album**: **For You – Fatin Shidqia**; L1ve to Love, Love to L1ve – Afgan; Cakra Khan – Cakra Khan; Mencari Cinta – Judika; Heart to Heart – Raisa

=== Rock/Metal ===
**Best Rock/Metal Solo Artist**: **Roy Jecovox – "Sang Saka Merah Putih"**; Adie Asturo – "Hey Why Try"; Beta – "Sweet Story"; Budi Cilok – "Matahari"; Sang Alang – "Apa Maumu"	**Best Rock Duo/Group**: **Superman Is Dead – "Jadilah Legenda"**; Andra & The Backbone – "Lebih Dari Siapapun"; Dynamic Blues – "Mama Rock n Roll"; Gugun Blues Shelter – "Love Your Life"; Superglad – "Berandalan Ibu Kota"; The Fly – "Bercahaya"
**Best Metal Duo/Group**: **Inlander – "Protokol"**; Boy Bandit – "Artis Karbitan"; Boy Bandit – "Politikus Media"; Down For Life – "Prosa Kesetaraan"; Trendkill Cowboys Rebellion – "Sistem Proletariat"	**Best Rock/Metal Album**: **Victory – Andra & The Backbone**; Artis Karbitan – Boy Bandit; Gugun Blues Shelter – Gugun Blues Shelter; The Moon – Roy Jecovox; Berandalan Ibu Kota – Superglad

=== Jazz/Instrumental ===
**Best Vocal Jazz/Instrumental Solo Performers**: **Krishna Balagita – "Something Unusual"**; Boby Limijaya – "Journey"; Diah Iskandar – "Potret Kasih"; Dian Kusuma – "Bunga Anggrek"; Vadi – "Jangan Salah"	**Best Vocal Jazz/Instrumental Duo/Group**: **Simak Dialog – "Simak Dialog"**; Fusion Stuff – "The Awakening"; Gustu Brahmana – "Gustu Brahmana"; Ligro – "Milesway"; Perspektif – "Even Rain"
**Best Vocal Jazz/Instrumental Jazz Album**: **The 6th Story – Simak Dialog**; Journey – Boby Limijaya; Potret Kasih – Diah Iskandar; Fussion Stuff – Fussion Stuff; Gustur Brahmana – Gustur Brahmana; Something Unusual – Krishna Balagita

=== Contemporary Kroncong/Kroncong/Style/Opera ===
**Best Contemporary Kroncong/Kroncong/Style/Opera Duo/Group Solo Performers**: **Dian Mita – "Meraih Rembulan"**; Iis Fersida Emping – "Keroncong Ibunda"; James Chu & Waldjinah – "Antara Benci dan Rindu"; Ratna Listy – "Langgam Kenangan di Desa"; Sinten Remen – "Kopi Susu"; Ubiet dkk. – "Keroncong Kemayoran"	**Best Contemporary Kroncong/Kroncong/Style/Stambul Songwriter**: **Ariyatna Rusmana – "Langgam Kenangan di Desa" (performed by Ratna Listy)**; Koko Thole – "Meraih Rembulan" (performed by Dian Mita); Budi Luthrock – "Keroncong Ibunda" (performed by Iis Fersida Emping); Budi Luthrock – "Keroncong Satu Rindu" (performed by Iis Fersida Emping); Sinten Remen – "Kopi Susu" (performed by Sinten Remen)
**Best Contemporary Kroncong/Kroncong/Style/Opera Recording Producer**: **Ubiet dkk. – "Keroncong Kemayoran" (performed by Ubiet dkk.)**; Pesona Jiwa – "Meraih Rembulan" (performed by Dian Mita); Budi Luthrock – "Keroncong Ibunda" (performed by Iis Fersida Emping); James Chu – "Antara Benci dan Rindu" (performed by James Chu & Waldjinah); O.K. Pranaswara – "Langgan Kenangan di Desa" (performed by Ratna Listy)	**Best Contemporary Kroncong/Kroncong Album**: **Keroncong Asli Ratna Listy – Ratna Listy**; Keroncong Nova – James Chu & Waldjinah; Omdo – Sinten Remen; New Keroncong Modern – Iis Fersida Emping; Keroncong Payung Fantasi – Safitri; Keroncong Kemayoran – Ubiet dkk.

=== Malay Dangdut/Contemporary Dangdut/Dangdut ===
**Best Dangdut Female/Male Solo Artist**: **Ikke Nurjanah – "Sendiri Saja"**; Amriz Arifin – "Mawar Pesona"; Hendri Lamiri – "Jangan Tsunami (instrumental)"; Kristina – "Duren Sawit"; Ratna Anjani – "Demi Cinta"	**Best Contemporary Dangdut Female Solo Artist**: **Ayu Ting Ting – "Geregetan"**; Juwita Bahar – "Buka Sithik Joss"; Melinda – "Galau"; Novi Ayla – "Cius (Cinta Tulus)"; Ria Amelia – "Biarlah Aku Mengalah"
**Best Contemporary Dangdut Male Solo Artist**: **Nassar – "Gejolak Asmara"**; Adibal Sahrul – "Tuhan Tolong"; Beniqno – "Lelaki Pede"; Den Fajar – "Alamat Asli"; Denny Cagur – "Goyang Bang Jali"; Tegar – "Aku Yang Dulu Bukan Yang Sekarang"	**Best Contemporary Dangdut/Dangdut Duo, Group/Collaboration**: **Barakatak & Kania – "Acong Kawin Lagi"**; Orkestik – "Gadis Bercadar"; Orkestik & Novi Ayla – "Caka (Cinta Karena Allah)"; Sherly Mey & Adibal Sahrul – "Aku Tergila-Gila"; Srigala – "Gara-Gara Dangdut"
**Best Malay Dangdut Duo/Group Solo Artist**: **Beniqno & Vivien – "Jinak Merpati"**; **Beniqno & Vivien – "Sakitnya Dimadu"**; Amriz Arifin – "Nurjani"; Cut Niken – "Negeri Laskar Pelangi"	**Best Malay Dangdut/Contemporary Dangdut/Dangdut Songwriter**: **Tengku Shafick – "Geregetan" (performed by Ayu Ting Ting)**; Edi Nuansa – "Sendiri Saja" (performed by Ikke Nurjanah); CongQ and Debios Ikola – "Goyang Bang Jali" (performed by Denny Cagur); Adibal Sahrul – "Gejolak Asmara" (performed by Nassar); Den Fajar – "Duren Sawit" (performed by Kristina)
**Best Malay Dangdut/Contemporary Dangdut/Dangdut Recording Producer**: **Mara Karma – "Sendiri Saja" (performed by Ikke Nurjanah)**; Tengku Shafick – "Geregetan" (performed by Ayu Ting Ting); Gema – "Jinak Merpati" (performed by Beniqno & Vivien); CongQ – "Goyang Bang Jali" (performed by Denny Cagur); Iskandar – "Ya Rahman Ya Rahim" (performed by Kristina)

=== Children ===
**Best Children Female Solo Artist**: **Woro – "Walang Kekek"**; Dian – "Kupu-Kupu"; Embun Tabina – "Dunia Kecil"; Kanya – "Melati Suci"; Rumah Amalia – "Rumah Amalia, Rumah Cinta Kami"	**Best Children Male Solo Artist**: **Tegar – "Aku Yang Dulu Bukan Yang Sekarang"**; Ari – "Ayah"; Rafi – "Doo Be Doo"; Satria – "Sahabat Sejati"; Sensen – "Apanya Dong"
**Best Children Duo/Group/Vocal Group**: **Coboy Junior – "Kenapa Mengapa"**; Boy Sopranos – "Damai Bersamamu"; Lollipop – "Aku Bukan Boneka"; Suara Anak Bumi – "Tanam"; Super7 – "Bersama Meraih Mimpi"	**Best Children Songwriter**: **Patrick Effendy – "Kenapa Mengapa" (performed by Coboy Junior)**; Jimmy Yulianto – "Dunia Kecil" (performed by Embun Tabina); Iyya – "Lollipop Dance" (performed by Lollipop); Erwin Gutawa and Gita Gutawa – "Di Duniaku" (performed by Noni); Paul T-Five – "Bersama Meraih Mimpi" (performed by Super7); Ratna Kil and Wa2n J – "Aku Yang Dulu Bukan Yang Sekarang" (performed by Tegar)
**Best Children Recording Producer**: **Erwin Gutawa – "Ayah" (performed by Ari)**; Smaradhana – "Kenapa Mengapa" (performed by Coboy Junior); Jimmy Yulianto – "Dunia Kecil" (performed by Embun Tabina); Oppie Andaresta – "Tanam" (performed by Suara Anak Bumi); Paul T-Five – "Bersama Meraih Mimpi" (performed by Super7); Indra Firzy – "Aku Yang Dulu Bukan Yang Sekarang" (performed by Tegar)	**Best Children Album**: **CJR – Coboy Junior**; Bersama Meraih Mimpi – Super7; Lollipop – Lollipop; Rumah Cinta Kami – Rumah Amalia; Suara Anak Bumi – Suara Anak Bumi

=== Production Work ===
**Best Field Cross Track**: **Endah N Rhesa – "Silence Island"**; Iwan Fals – "Raya"; Maliq & D'Essentials – "Drama Romantika"; Sinten Remen – "Kopi Susu"; Sound of Orang Kampung – "Don't Move"; Ubiet dkk. – "Keroncong Kemayoran"	**Best R&B/Soul Production Work**: **Raisa – "Bye Bye"**; Afgan – "Pesan Cinta"; Kemala Ayu – "Buat Kamu"; Pay (featuring Vanya and Irang) – "Pas Kena Hati"; RAN (featuring Tulus) – "Kita Bisa"
**Best Rap/Hip-Hop Production Work**: **Soul ID – "Berlari"**; #Skubyb – "Teman-Teman"; Jupiter & Vee – "Lets Ride"; Keripik Peudeus – "Mimpi"; Neo (featuring Ikmal Tobing) – "Hello"; Yacko – "Ink & Paint"	**Best Reggae/Ska/Dub Production Work**: **Shaggydog – "Berdansa"**; Gangstarasta – "Lagu Kebebasan"; Ras Muhamad – "Negeri Pelangi"; Souljah – "Move On"; Tipe-X – "Boy Band"
**Best Dance/Electronic Production Work**: **Regina – "Kemenangan"**; Bexxa – "It's You"; DJ Yasmin – "Blessed"; Krisdayanti – "Ratu Cinta"; Soul ID – "Berlari"	**Best Collaboration Production Work**: **Judika & Duma – "Sampai Akhir"**; Bebi Romeo (featuring Rossa) – "Bukan Cinta Biasa"; Bebi Romeo (featuring Tata Janeeta) – "Bawalah Cintaku"; BLP (featuring Glenn Fredly) – "Menunggu"; Citra Scholastika (featuring Piyu) – "Alasan Terbesar"; Sherina (featuring Vidi Aldiano) – "Apakah Ku Jatuh Cinta"
**Best Original Soundtrack Film Production Work**: **Nidji – "Sumpah & Cinta Matiku" (Original soundtrack: Tenggelamnya Kapal Van Der Wijck)**; Cut Niken – "Negeri Laskar Pelangi" (Original soundtrack: Laskar Pelangi 2: Edensor); Mahirs – "Ratuku" (Original soundtrack: Ken Arok & Ken Dedes); Nidji – "Di Atas Awan" (Original soundtrack: 5cm); Rumah Amalia – "Rumah Cinta Kami" (Original soundtrack: Rumah Tanpa Jendela); Padi – "Sahabat Selamanya" (Original soundtrack: Upin & Ipin)	**Best Vocal Group Production Work**: **JKT48 – "River"**; 7icons – "Cinta 7 Susun"; Bexxa – "It's You"; Cherrybelle – "Diam-Diam Suka"; Coboy Junior – "Ngaca Dulu Deh"; Project Pop – "Gara-Gara Kahitna"
**Best Speaking Region Production Work**: **White Shoes & The Couples Company – "Jangi Janger"**; Amriz Arifin – "Nasib Tutuang Daun"; Didi Kempot – "Tangise Adit"; Rama Aiphama – "Kyai Deng Pandeta Baku Sayang"; Ria Amelia – "Hiduik Dirantau Subarang"	**Best Instrumental Production Work**: **Tohpati – "Semusim"**; Andy Owen – "Black Neck"; Hendri Lamiri – "Jangan Tsunami"; Krishna Balagita – "Something Unusual"; Ligro – "Miles Away"

=== Field Production Support ===
**Best Recording Album Producer**: **Sony Music Indonesia – For You (released by Fatin Shidqia)**; Yonathan Nugroho/Trinity Optima Production – L1ve to Love, Love to L1ve (released by Afgan); Gita Gutawa and Erwin Gutawa/Gut Records – Di Atas Rata-Rata (released by Anak-Anak DARR); Albert Tanoni/Hits Records – Pasti Bisa (released by Citra Scholastika); Sony Music Indonesia – Mencari Cinta (released by Judika); Solid Record and Universal Music Indonesia – Heart to Heart (released by Raisa)	**Best Graphic Design Album**: **Bebe I – The Man Suite (released by Cause)**; Emir Hakim – Di Atas Rata-Rata (released by Anak-Anak DARR); Stark Studio – Lentera Hati (released by ST 12); Helly KKK – Sunset Di Tanah Anarki (released by Superman Is Dead); Balian Panjaitan – Tuna (released by Sherina)
**Best Mix Engineer**: **Eko Sulistyo – "Sebelum Selamanya" (performed by Sherina)**; DJ Sumantri – "Bye Bye" (performed by Raisa); Pay and Nico – "Jangan Gila" (performed by Bunga Citra Lestari); Eko Sulistyo – "Jangan Remehkan" (performed by Anak-Anak DARR); Radith – "Protokol" (performed by Inlander)

=== General ===
**Best of the Best Album**: **For You – Fatin Shidqia**; L1ve to Love, Love to L1ve – Afgan; Raya – Iwan Fals; Mencari Cinta – Judika; Heart to Heart – Raisa	**Best of the Best Newcomer**: **Fatin Shidqia – "Aku Memilih Setia"**; 3Composer – "Salah Benar"; Citra Scholastika – "Berlian"; Regina – "Terlalu Indah"; Tegar – "Aku Yang Dulu Bukan Yang Sekarang"
**Best of the Best Production Work**: **"Lumpuhkan Ingatanku" – Geisha**; "Salah Benar" – 3Composer; "Lebih Dari Siapapun" – Andra & The Backbone; "Geregetan" – Ayu Ting Ting; "Aku Memilih Setia" – Fatin Shidqia; "Sampai Akhir" – Judika & Duma

AMI Legend Awards
**alm. Idris Sardi**

== Artist with most nominations and awards ==
The following artist received most nominations:

Nominations	Artist
8	Fatin Shidqia
7	Afgan
7	Raisa
6	Coboy Junior
5	3Composer
5	Citra Scholastika
5	Judika
5	Piyu
5	Sherina
5	Tegar
4	Ayu Ting Ting
4	Geisha
4	Super7

The following artist received most awards:

Awards	Artist
5	Fatin Shidqia
4	Geisha
3	Coboy Junior
2	Ayu Ting Ting
2	Simak Dialog
2	Ratna Listy
2	Ikke Nurjanah
2	Beniqno
2	Judika
2	Duma Riris
