= 12 Lagu Islami Terbaik - Fatin & Friends =

Compilation album by Various artists
- Released: 24 June 2014
- Recorded: 2001–2014
- Genre: Pop
- Length: 47:40
- Label: Sony Music Entertainment Indonesia

Fatin Shidqia chronology
For You (2013)	12 Lagu Islami Terbaik - Fatin & Friends (2014)	Dreams (2016)

Singles from 12 Lagu Islami Terbaik - Fatin & Friends
- 1. "Proud of You Moslem" Released: 18 June 2014

12 Lagu Islami Terbaik - Fatin & Friends is a 12 track compilation album by various artists that was released through Sony Music Entertainment Indonesia on 24 June 2014. This album, 12 Lagu Islami Terbaik - Fatin & Friends features a 12 tracks Islamic songs, in which many have that song so popular in Ramadhan. There is new songs from this album, "Proud of You Moslem" and "Oh Tuhan", sung by Fatin Shidqia, which become first single from this album. This album only sold in Gramedia bookstore and iTunes.

== Track listing ==
No.	Title	Singer (s)	Length
1.	"Oh Tuhan"	Fatin Shidqia	3:53
2.	"Proud of You Moslem"	Fatin Shidqia	3:45
3.	"Kisah 8 Dirham"	Gita Gutawa	3:22
4.	"Akhirnya (Ramadhan Version)"	Nindy & Dide Hijau Daun	4:32
5.	"Arti Puasa"	Tasya	2:58
6.	"Lupakah Engkau?"	Audy	4:30
7.	"Tadarus"	Ihsan	3:16
8.	"Maha Pengasih Maha Penyayang"	Gito Rollies	4:11
9.	"Kuatkan Aku"	Vagetoz	4:07
10.	"Rasul Menyuruh Mencintai Anak Yatim"	Atina	4:31
11.	"Ikhlas"	Gito Rollies	4:07
12.	"Dengan Menyebut Nama Allah"	Lana Nitibaskara	4:28
Total length:			47:40
