= Love Me Now =

Love Me Now may refer to:

- "Love Me Now" (Melanie Amaro song), 2012
- "Love Me Now" (John Legend song), 2016
- "Love Me Now" by Kygo and Zoe Wees, 2021
- "Love Me Now", by Gino Vannelli from Storm at Sunup, 1975
- "Love Me Now", by Sheppard from Watching the Sky, 2018
- "Love Me Now", a single from DJs Ofenbach 2022 album I
- Love Me Now?, a 2018 album by Tory Lanez
