= Fatin Shidqia =

Indonesian singer and actress (born 1996)

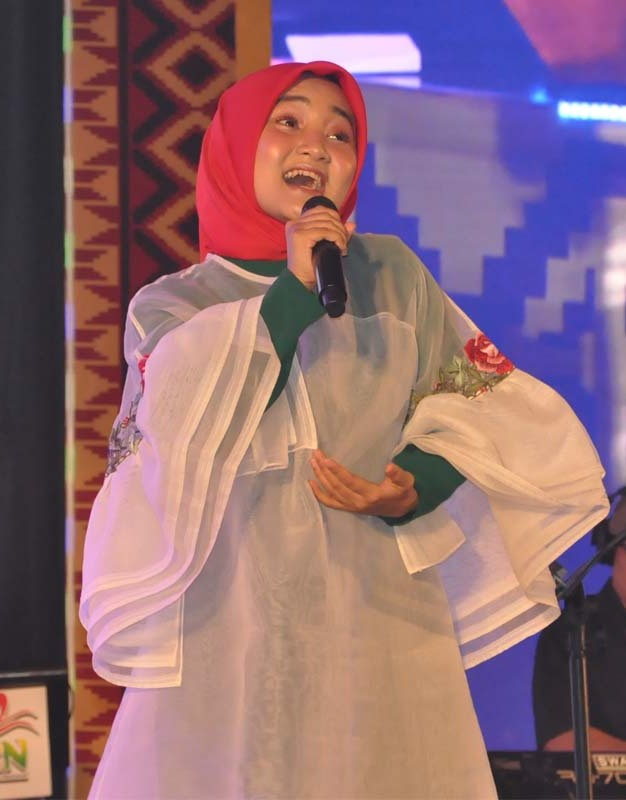
- Fatin Shidqia in 2019
- Born: Fatin Shidqia Lubis; July 30, 1996 (age 29); Jakarta, Indonesia
- Other name: Fatin
- Occupation: Singer
- Years active: 2013–present
- Musical career
- Genres: Pop
- Instrument: Vocal
- Labels: Sony Music Entertainment Indonesia, Columbia Records, RCA Records

Fatin Shidqia Lubis (born 30 July 1996), better known as Fatin Shidqia or Fatin, is an Indonesian singer who won the first season of X Factor Indonesia in May 2013. Fatin currently stands as the most successful winner of X Factor Indonesia in history. She was signed to record label Sony Music Entertainment Indonesia.

After winning The X Factor, Fatin released her winner's single "Aku Memilih Setia", which debuted at number one on iTunes Indonesia. Fatin also released her debut album titled For You, which debuted at number one on the iTunes Indonesia Album Chart and became one of the most successful albums of the year domestically. The album earned her eight AMI Awards nominations and five wins, including Best of the Best Album, Best of the Best Newcomer, and Best Pop Female Solo Artist. For You and the six singles released from the album have sold a total of over 500.000 copies domestically. "Dia Dia Dia" was released as the second single in December 2013, which peaked at number 16 on the music chart. The single earned her an Anugerah Planet Muzik Award for the Most Popular Song.

In August 2016, Fatin received the Best Asian New Female Act award from the Daf BAMA Music Awards held at Barclaycard Arena, Hamburg, Germany, which made her the first Indonesian to ever receive the award.

== Early life ==
Fatin Shidqia was born in Jakarta and resided in South Jakarta. She was a student of SMA Negeri 97 Jakarta. She began singing at age two, according to her mother.

== Career ==
=== 2012 – 2013: X Factor Indonesia and Debut Album "For You" ===
In 2012, Fatin auditioned for the first season of X Factor Indonesia with the song "Grenade", originally sung by Bruno Mars. She amazed the judges in her audition and received a lot of positive feedback among social media users, advancing to the next round. Her audition video has since garnered 4 million views on YouTube (as of October 2013). Soon after, she advanced through the first day of boot camp, where she performed "Rindu" and advanced through the next day. On the second day, acts were given dance lessons by choreographers. The judges then split the number of acts down to two groups, 22 acts through to the next day, and the remaining 50 acts must perform once again, with an a cappella performance. Fatin didn't do well on Stage Act, so she had to do the a cappella performance. She performed Paris (Ooh La La) and advanced through the next day. On camp 3, she performed "Pumped Up Kicks". She was one of seven contestants in the Female Under 26 category to perform at the judges' houses stage of the competition, for Rossa and her guest judge, Maia Estianty, performed the song "Cintakan Membawamu Kembali". She advanced into the Showcase, where she performed "Diamonds". She was put through to the Gala Live Show, where she performed "Rumour Has It". She advanced to the Top 12 when she performed "Pudar".

On 8 March 2013, she performed "Girl on Fire" and got into the top 10. On 15 March, she performed "Don't Speak", and sending her into the top 9. She performed "Perahu Kertas" and advanced to the top 8. She sang Bruno Mars' song, "It Will Rain", in week 6 and Duffy's song, "Mercy", in week 7 and received positive comments from the judges on both performances. The next week, she performed "Jalan Cinta" and duet with Vina Panduwinata and sang "Logika". On Live Show 10, She performed "Pelan – Pelan Saja" and "Lovefool", both performances received positive comments from the judges.

She later advanced to the Finale round, in which she performed "Katakan Tidak" (with Afgansyah Reza), "Stay", and her Winner's Song, "Aku Memilih Setia".

On 25 May 2013, it was announced that she had finished the competition in first place and become the winner of the first season of X Factor Indonesia

==== Performances on X Factor Indonesia ====
Fatin performed the following songs on X Factor Indonesia:

Show	Theme	Song	Original artist	Order	Result
Audition	Free choice	"Grenade"	Bruno Mars	—N/a	Through to bootcamp
Bootcamp 1	Group Performance	"Rindu"	Agnes Monica	—N/a	Through to bootcamp 2
Bootcamp 2	Stage Act/choreography	—N/a	—N/a	—N/a	Through to bootcamp 3
Bootcamp 2	Mini Challenge (Sing in Acapella)	Paris (Ooh La La)	Grace Potter and the Nocturnals	—N/a	Through to bootcamp 3
Bootcamp 3	Solo Performance	"Pumped Up Kicks"	Foster the People	—N/a	Through to judges' houses
Judges' houses	Free choice	"Cinta Kan Membawamu Kembali"	Dewa 19	—N/a	Through to Showcase & Live Show
Showcase	Free choice	"Diamonds"	Rihanna	8	—N/a
Live show 1	Mentor's choice	"Rumour Has It"	Adele	4	Safe
Live show 2	Songs from my mentor	"Pudar"	Rossa	12	Safe
Live show 3	My favorite song	"Girl on Fire"	Alicia Keys	7	Safe
Live show 4	Songs from 90's	"Don't Speak"	No Doubt	8	Safe
Live show 5	Indonesia's mega hits	"Perahu Kertas"	Maudy Ayunda	6	Safe
Live show 6	My musical inspiration	"It Will Rain"	Bruno Mars	8	Safe
Live show 7	Hits Of the Century	"Mercy"	Duffy	6	Safe
Live Show 8	East meets west	"Arti Hadirmu"	Audy	2	Safe
Live Show 8	East meets west	"These Words"	Natasha Bedingfield	8	Safe
Live Show 9	Music of the women of Indonesia	"Jalan Cinta"	Sherina Munaf	5	Safe^{1}
Live Show 9	Music of the women of Indonesia	"Logika" (with Vina Panduwinata)	Vina Panduwinata	10	Safe^{1}
Live Show 10	Movie Soundtrack	"Pelan – Pelan Saja"	Kotak	4	Safe
Live Show 10	Movie Soundtrack	"Lovefool"	The Cardigans	8	Safe
Live Show 11	Tribute to Noah	"One Way or Another"	Blondie	2	Safe
Live Show 11	Tribute to Noah	"Tak Ada Yang Abadi"	Noah	6	Safe
Road to Grand Final	Viewer's Choices	"Everything at Once"	Lenka	3	Safe^{1}
Road to Grand Final	Duet with Mentor	"Material Girl" (with Rossa)	Madonna	6	Safe^{1}
Road to Grand Final	Viewer's Choices	"Grenade"	Bruno Mars	9	Safe^{1}
Grand Final	Celebrity Duets	"Katakan Tidak" (with Afgansyah Reza)	Afgansyah Reza	1	Safe
Grand Final	Mentor's challenge	"Stay"	Rihanna	4	Safe
Grand Final	Winner's song	"Aku Memilih Setia"	Fatin Shidqia	7	Safe
Grand Final	Finalist Duets	"Don't Stop Believin'"	Journey	9	Safe
The Result	Solo Performance	"Well, Well, Well"	Duffy	1	Winners
The Result	Duet with Eliminated Finalist	"Good Time" (with Mikha Angelo)	Owl City and Carly Rae Jepsen	3	Winners
The Result	Winner's song	"Aku Memilih Setia"	Fatin Shidqia	5	Winners

^1No Elimination on this week

After winning the first season of X Factor Indonesia, Fatin's winner single, "Aku Memilih Setia", was released digitally via iTunes. After release, the song debuted at number one on the iTunes Charts Indonesia. Fatin also appeared in an Indosat IM3 commercial. Fatin is also the one and only girl with a Hijab, who became the cover for the Indonesian magazine, "HAI". On 15 July 2013, Fatin was selected clothing line, "Rabbani", to become their brand ambassador and on the same day, Fatin released her second single titled "KekasihMu". This song was available in the compilation album "The Best of Islamic Music Vol.2" with Maher Zain and Sandhy Sondoro. On 24 August 2013, Fatin with Novita Dewi performed in RCTI's 24th-anniversary television special, X Factor Around the World, along with Samantha Jade, Jahméne Douglas, The Collective, and Melanie Amaro. Fatin performed her X Factor winner's single, "Aku Memilih Setia", and "Payphone" as a duet with The Collective and then sang "The World's Greatest" duet with Melanie Amaro.

On 25 August 2013, Fatin held a mini-concert in Bandung, West Java, entitled "Fatin Shidqia Live Charity Concert" at Tennis Indoor Bikasoga. That show was sponsored by "Rabbani", "Rumah Yatim", "Rumah Cinta", and "Horison Hotel". It was reported that some of the profits would be donated to orphans.

In September 2013, Fatin appeared in her film debut titled 99 Cahaya di Langit Eropa and sang for this movie's soundtrack. This movie was on screen on 5 December 2013. On 7 November 2013, Fatin released her third single and second music video on YouTube titled "Dia Dia Dia". This single was released before Fatin released her debut album. On 10 November 2013, one day before Fatin released her debut album, Fatin received the award "Most Shining Stars 2013" from Tabloid Bintang along with other artist, such as Raisa Andriana, Reza Rahadian, JKT48, Joe Taslim, Maudy Ayunda, Caisar, Deddy Corbuzier, Coboy Junior, and couple Arie Untung & Fenita Arie. On 11 November 2013, Fatin released her debut album titled For You and the album's marketing was in cooperation with KFC Indonesia (PT MNC Fastfood Indonesia). In this album, Fatin collaborated with Swedish songwriter and music producer, Gustav Efraimsson, and Australian songwriter/producer, Hayden Bell. On 22 November 2013, Fatin released her new music video titled "Cahaya Di Langit Itu" on YouTube. This song became the original soundtrack for her debut film titled 99 Cahaya di Langit Eropa. At the 2013 Yahoo! OMG Awards, Fatin received a nomination for 'Rising Star of the Year' and won the latter award. Fatin also received 2 nominations at the 2013 HAI Reader's Poll Music Awards from the Indonesian magazine, "HAI", for 'The Best Fresh Meat' and 'The Best Female' On 7 December, Fatin held a concert to launching her debut album on RCTI titled "Fatin For You". On that show, Fatin collaboration with Kevin Aprilio, Mikha Angelo, Al Ghazali, New Kingz, and Gamaliel. And the end of the show, Fatin was surprised that her album got multiplatinum in 3 weeks after released.

On 28 December, Fatin received 4 nominations at 2013 Expose Awards for Celeb of The Year, Female Singer of The Year, Song of The Year, and Newcomer of The Year and won the latter awards.

=== 2014–present: Second Album and Debut Film ===
On 20 January 2014, Fatin appeared on Konser KFC Adu Bintang 2 alongside Indonesian musicians such as Ahmad Dhani, Indra Lesmana, Krisdayanti, Titi DJ, Ruth Sahanaya, Marcell Siahaan, Bunga Citra Lestari, Mulan Jameela, Ari Lasso, Judika, Sammy Simorangkir, and Mike Mohede. On the show, Fatin performed a duet with Mulan Jameela singing Pertama by Reza Artamevia. On 21 January, Fatin attended 2014 Dahsyatnya Awards and performed "Aku Memilih Setia" alongside Citra Scholastika. On the show, Fatin received award for "Penyanyi Pendatang Baru Terdahsyat (Outstanding Newcomer Singer)". On 5 April 2014, Fatin attended the 17th Panasonic Gobel Awards and performed a medley of "Aku Memilih Setia" and "Dia Dia Dia". On 20 May, Fatin released the music video for her single featuring The Overtunes titled "Kaulah Kamuku". On 13 June 2014, Fatin appeared on 2014 Nickelodeon Indonesia Kids' Choice Awards, in which she won the "Favorite Singer" award and performed "Happy" by Pharrell Williams with Ayu Ting Ting and Cakra Khan. On 19 June, Fatin appeared on 2014 Anugerah Musik Indonesia and performed "Aku Memilih Setia" alongside Repvblik. Fatin also received 5 awards from 8 nominations including awards for "Best New Artist" and "Best Female Pop Soloist" beating Raisa and Andien.

Fatin made her acting debut in an Indonesian movie titled Dreams, which was released on 10 March 2016. Fatin starred alongside two big names in Indonesian film industry, Mathias Muchus and Fauzi Baadila. Fatin sang the original soundtrack for the movie titled "Away", which became the first English language song she ever recorded.

== Discography ==
=== Studio albums ===
Title	Album details	Certification
For You	Released: 11 November 2013; Label: Sony Music Entertainment Indonesia; Format: CD, digital download	Indonesia: 7× Platinum

=== Singles ===
Year	Title	Peak chart position	Album
2013	"Aku Memilih Setia"	10	For You
2013	"KekasihMu"	–	The Best of Islamic Music Vol.2
2013	"Dia Dia Dia"	–	For You
2013	"Cahaya Di Langit Itu"	–	For You
2014	"Jangan Kau Bohong" (featuring New Kingz)	–	For You
2014	"Kaulah Kamuku" (featuring The Overtunes)	–	For You
2014	"Proud of You Moslem"	–	12 Lagu Islami Terbaik - Fatin & Friends
2014	"Semua Tentangmu"	–	For You
2014	"Demi Cintaku"	–	Fariz RM & Dian PP In Collaboration With
2015	"Cintamu"	–	Seno M. Hardjo Presents: The Great Composers – James F. Sundah & Oddie Agam
2015	"Away"	–	Dreams
2016	"Percaya"	–	Dreams
2016	"Salahkah Aku Terlalu Mencintaimu"	–	Y2Koustic
2017	"Ketika Tangan dan Kaki Berkata"	–	—N/a
2018	"Shoot Me Now"	–	—N/a
2018	"Jingga"	–	—N/a
2019	"Bersyukurlah"	–	—N/a
2019	"Hanya Mimpi"	–	—N/a
2020	"Pelangi dan Hujan"	–	—N/a

== Filmography ==
Film
Year	Title	Role	Notes
2013	99 Cahaya di Langit Eropa	Herself	Cameo & Theme Song
2016	Dreams	Fatin	Debut Film
