= Melanie Amaro =

American singer

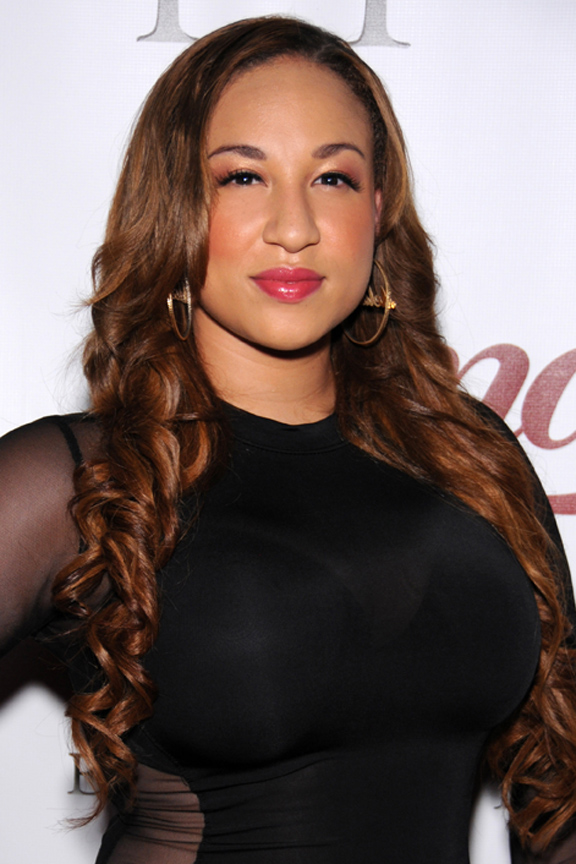
- Amaro in June 2013

Background information
- Born: Melanie Ann Amaro; June 26, 1992 (age 34); Fort Lauderdale, Florida, U.S.
- Origin: Tortola, British Virgin Islands
- Genres: Pop; R&B; adult contemporary; soul; dance
- Occupation: Singer
- Instruments: Vocals; piano
- Years active: 2011–present
- Labels: Moorehouse Music Group; Syco; Epic
- Website: https://www.melanie-amaro.com

Melanie Ann Amaro (born June 26, 1992) is an American singer who won the first season of The X Factor USA in 2011, securing a $5 million recording contract with Syco Music and Epic Records. Amaro was also the youngest contestant to win the competition during the show's run (2011–2013).

== Early life ==
Amaro was born in Fort Lauderdale, Florida, and raised on Tortola, British Virgin Islands since the age of three. Amaro was sent to the British Virgin Islands to live with her grandmother Catherine, after her parents Hipolito Amaro and Debra Sylvester Amaro felt they did not have the means to provide for her. Amaro would only see her parents during summer vacations and Christmas breaks. She also has two brothers, Mark and Michael, and a younger sister named Maya. Her mother Debra recalls that when her daughter was about six months old, she would get up at around two o'clock in the morning and would start singing in her crib. Furthermore, from an early age, Amaro would sing around her house using a hairbrush as a microphone. Melanie realized she fell in love with singing and acting at around age eleven, and credits her mother for pushing her to follow her singing dreams.

Amaro never entered any singing competitions as a child, but performed at weddings, churches, and other events. Melanie attended the Althea Scatliffe Primary School and later went on to Elmore Stoutt high school, formerly known as BVI high school. Melanie moved to Florida when she was 15, and graduated from Plantation High School in 2010. In March 2012, her high school chorus teacher, Gary Rivenbark, whom Amaro credits with the help of shaping her voice, died of lymphoma at age 48.

== Music career ==
=== 2011: The X Factor ===
In June 2011, Amaro was persuaded by her mother to audition for the first season of The X Factor USA. She auditioned in front of judges Simon Cowell, Paula Abdul, Nicole Scherzinger and L.A. Reid, singing "Listen" by Beyoncé Knowles. She previously tried auditioning at her local Fox affiliate for a "fast pass", but was not well received by producers there and subsequently auditioned with the general public at the BankUnited Center in Coral Gables, Florida. After becoming one of the Top 32 finalists, she performed Michael Jackson's "Will You Be There" in the judges' house, in front of her mentor Cowell. Amaro was initially not chosen to be part of the Top 16 and was eliminated from the girls' category. However, after 2 weeks Cowell surprised her at her Florida home, inviting her back to the competition after deciding he had made "a huge mistake" in not including her.

Amaro progressed to the live shows in Cowell's girls' category, along with Rachel Crow, Drew, Tiah Tolliver and Simone Battle. The addition of Amaro took the total number of qualifiers for the first live show to 17. On December 15, Amaro won a place in the final along with Chris Rene and Josh Krajcik. The following week, she was declared the winner. Amaro was also declared to be the show's youngest contestant to win at age 19. Her prize was a $5 million recording contract with Syco Music and a Sony Music label, which is the largest guaranteed prize in television history. Shortly after winning, Sony Music label Epic Records announced that they had officially signed Amaro, who would be working alongside L.A. Reid at the label. In addition to the contract, Amaro also appeared in a Pepsi commercial alongside Sir Elton John, which aired during Super Bowl XLVI on NBC.

==== Performances on The X Factor ====
Melanie Amaro performed the following songs on The X Factor:

Show	Theme	Song	Original artist	Order	Result
Audition	Free choice	"Listen"	Beyoncé	N/A	Through to bootcamp
Bootcamp 1	Group performance 1	"Run to You"	Whitney Houston	N/A	Through to bootcamp 2
Bootcamp 2	Group performance 2	"I Still Haven't Found What I'm Looking For" (with Jazzlyn Little, Stacy Francis, Heather Gayle, Aaron Surgeon, Arin Ray and Special Guest)	U2	N/A	Through to bootcamp 3
Bootcamp 3	Solo performance	Not aired		N/A	Through to judges' houses
Judges' houses	Free choice	"Will You Be There"	Michael Jackson	N/A	Advanced via Wild Card ^{1}
Live show 1	Free choice	"I Have Nothing"	Whitney Houston	17	Saved by Simon Cowell
Live show 2	Free choice	"Desperado"	Eagles	7	Safe (4th)
Live show 3	Songs from movies	"Man in the Mirror"	Michael Jackson	7	Safe (2nd)
Live show 4	Rock	"Everybody Hurts"	R.E.M.	5	Safe (2nd)
Live show 5	Giving thanks	"The World's Greatest"	R. Kelly	3	Safe (2nd)
Live show 6	Songs by Michael Jackson	"Earth Song"	Michael Jackson	7	Safe (1st)
Quarter-Final	Dance music hits	"Someone Like You"	Adele	1	Safe (1st)
Quarter-Final	Save me songs	"When You Believe"	Mariah Carey & Whitney Houston	6	Safe (1st)
Semi-Final	Pepsi challenge songs	"Hero"	Mariah Carey	3	Safe (1st)
Semi-Final	"Get me to the final" songs	"Feeling Good"	Cy Grant	7	Safe (1st)
Final	Celebrity duets	Duet "I Believe I Can Fly" with R. Kelly	R. Kelly	3	Winner (1st)
Final	Winner's song	"Listen"	Beyoncé	6	Winner (1st)
Final	Christmas songs	"All I Want for Christmas Is You"	Mariah Carey	1	Winner (1st)

^{^1}Amaro did not originally make it through to the live shows, but was later brought back as a wildcard.

=== 2012–present: Truly, label conflict and broadway ventures ===
Amaro's album was set for release on December 4, 2012. Amaro's Pepsi commercial aired during Super Bowl XLVI on NBC as part of her X Factor prize. The commercial featured Amaro singing a dance cover of "Respect", alongside Elton John, Flavor Flav, and Annie Ilonzeh. The song was released as a music download on February 2, 2012, and reached the #3 spot on the Billboard Dance/Club Chart. On August 1, Amaro released her debut single "Don't Fail Me Now", written by Livvi Franc and produced by Rodney Jerkins. On 19 October 2012 Amaro premiered the music video for "Don't Fail Me Now" on her official VEVO account. The song failed to chart and the album was pushed back to 2013. She performed a new single, "Long Distance", live on The X Factor on December 6, 2012. The song was released on December 3, 2012. Truly was rescheduled for March 2013, but was never released. While season 2 winner Tate Stevens debut album was released in April 2013 under RCA Nashville, Amaro's label has stated that her album has no confirmed release date.

In August 2013, Amaro performed in Indonesia for RCTI's 24th anniversary television special, X Factor Around the World along with Samantha Jade, Jahméne Douglas, The Collective, Novita Dewi and Fatin Shidqia. Amaro performed her new single "Long Distance" and then "The World's Greatest" as a duet with Fatin Shidqia.

On October 4, 2013, Amaro made her musical theater debut in the national tour of "You're Never Alone".

In 2014 Amaro relocated to Atlanta GA, with new management. Under new management, Amaro began touring and performing in such places as the Cayman Islands for fashion week as well as a few cities in the USA. On June 19, 2014, she premiered the lead single "Fuel My Fire" on SoundCloud from her upcoming EP of the same name. Amaro described the song as being about "her frustration with the lack of music released by her label." The song was released independently as a digital download on June 26, 2014, without Epic or Sony being credited.

As of September 2014, Amaro's album is believed to have been scrapped and will not be released. Months later "Fuel My Fire" was taken off of iTunes for unknown reasons.

On May 6, 2015, Amaro released a new song "Dust" featuring American hip-hop recording artist, Fabolous. "Dust" entered the independent charts at #1 and remained #1 for 6 weeks. It stayed on the Indie charts for 6 consecutive months. It is the second independent release of the artist ever since her departure from Syco & Epic Records. "Dust" was finally released to digital retail stores in September 2015. A solo version without Fabolous was also released.

On February 17, 2016, Amaro released a new song "The One".

In January 2018, Melanie Amaro was living in Atlanta, GA, with her newborn son and was signed under up-and-coming Indie label Moorehouse Music Group, LLC, headed by producer and multi-instrumentalist Justin A. Moore. Melanie is the first woman and artist signed to the label. Under Moorehouse Music Group, Melanie has released the singles 'Whole Mood', 'Enough', and 'Play No Games'.

== Discography ==
=== Singles ===
==== As lead artist ====
Title	Year	Peak chart positions	Album
Title	Year	US Dance	Album
"Don't Fail Me Now"	2012	8	Non-album singles
"Long Distance"	2012	—	Non-album singles
"Fuel My Fire	2014	—	Fuel My Fire
"Dust" (featuring Fabolous)	2015	—	Non-album singles
"The One"	2016	—	Non-album singles

==== As featured artist ====
Title	Year	Album
"Girl Code" (Rocki Boulis featuring Melanie Amaro)	2012	Girl Code
"Can't Wait" (Konshens featuring Melanie Amaro)	2015	—N/a

==== Other charted songs ====
Year	Title	Peak chart positions		Album
Year	Title	US Dance	US Adult R&B	Album
2012	"Respect"	3	—	Non-album song
2012	"Love Me Now"	—	27	Truly

== Awards and nominations ==
Year	Association	Category	Work	Result
2012	Teen Choice Awards 2012	Female Reality Star	The X Factor	Nominated

Preceded by Series premiered	Winner of The X Factor; 2011	Succeeded by Tate Stevens
