= Automatik (song) =

Single by Livvi Franc
- Released: 2 April 2010
- Recorded: 2009
- Genre: Synth-pop
- Length: 2:52
- Label: RCA/Jive Label Group
- Songwriters: Olivia Waithe; Cathy Dennis; Evan "Kidd" Bogart
- Producer: RedOne

Livvi Franc singles chronology
"Now I'm That Bitch" (2009)	"Automatik" (2010)	"Nobody Loves Me" (2010)

"Automatik" is the second official single from the self-titled debut album by Barbadian British singer Livvi Franc. The song was announced to be released on Franc's official website on 17 September, and premiered on her official Myspace two days later. It was released as a digital download on 2 April 2010.

== Music video ==
The music video, directed by Malcolm Jones, features Franc arriving at a nightclub and encountering her ex-boyfriend there. As suggested by the song, she is trying to shake him off but she keeps coming back to him. The video premiered on YouTube on 31 January 2010.

== Charts ==
Chart (2010)	Peak position
U.S. Billboard Hot Dance Club Songs	6
