= Outta Control (Baby Bash song) =

Single by Baby Bash featuring Pitbull
- Released: July 21, 2009
- Recorded: 2009
- Genre: Crunk
- Length: 3:22
- Label: Arista
- Songwriter(s): Craig Love
- Producer(s): Lil' Jon

Baby Bash singles chronology
"That's How I Go" (2009)	"Outta Control" (2009)	"Go Girl" (2010)

Pitbull singles chronology
"Now I'm That Bitch" (2009)	"Outta Control" (2009)	"Shut It Down" (2009)

"Outta Control" is a song by Baby Bash featuring Pitbull. It was released as a single in July 2009, and officially premiered on radio stations in June and reached the top ten on the iTunes top 100 in August.

== Music video ==
Despite the song being popular in the mid-quarter of the year, the music video was shot in Toxic nightclub in Corpus Christi and was released in December. Quest Crew, the winners of America's Best Dance Crew season 3, made an appearance in throughout the video.

== Chart positions ==
Chart (2009)	Peak position
US Bubbling Under Hot 100 (Billboard)	13
US Hot Rap Songs (Billboard)	14
