= Ikke Nurjanah =

Indonesian singer and actress (born 1974)

- Born: Hartini Erpi Nurjanah; 18 May 1974 (age 52); Pademangan Timur, Pademangan, North Jakarta, Jakarta, Indonesia
- Other name: Ikke Nurjanah
- Education: Jayabaya University
- Occupations: actress; singer
- Years active: 1987–present
- Spouses: Aldi "Bragi" (m. 1998; div. 2007) Karlie Fu (m. 2021)
- Children: Siti Adira Kania
- Parent(s): Abdul Pihar Tanjung; Junaerti
- Musical career
- Genres: Dangdut
- Instrument: vocal
- Labels: Universal Music Indonesia; Nagaswara

Hartini Erpi Nurjanah (born 18 May 1974), better known as Ikke Nurjanah, is an Indonesian dangdut singer and actress. She was born in Pademangan Timur, Pademangan, North Jakarta.

== Career ==
She won the award for Best Dangdut Female Soloist at the 1997 Anugerah Musik Indonesia.

In 2012, she released Diary Dangdut, a book written with Umi Siregar, which chronicled her career. In 2014 and 2015, she was a judge on Kontes Dangdut Indonesia (KDI) on MNCTV. In September 2016 she traveled to the United States to give a lecture at the University of Pittsburgh, to perform with an Indonesian band at that university, and to read from her book at the Library of Congress in Washington, D.C.

In January 2017, she was a guest judge on Dangdut Academy season 4 on Indosiar. She released a single, "Terhanyut Dalam Kemesraan", written by Fauzi Bima, on April 6, 2018.

== Discography ==
- Gelimang Duka (1987)
- Semangkok Bersama Sesendok Berdua (1987)
- Gerbang Sengsara (1988)
- Ojo Lali (1989)
- Ojo Suwe-Suwe (1989)
- Iki Loh Mas (1990)
- Bibir Bermadu (1990)
- Saat Jumpa Pertama (1991)
- Cobaan Asmara (1992)
- Biru Putih Cintaku (1992)
- Aib (1992)
- Ati Nelongso (1993)
- Terhina (1993)
- Bagai Disambar Petir (1994)
- Sun Sing Suwe (1994)
- Cambuk Derita (1994)
- Nomor Satu (1995)
- Birunya Rindu (1995)
- Merpati Putih (1996)
- Gelang Alit (1996)
- Cinta Dan Dilema (1997)
- Padang Rembulan (1997)
- Memandangmu (1998)
- Padang Bulan (1998)
- Senyum Dan Hatimu (1999)
- Best of the Best (1999)
- Selalu Milikmu (2001)
- Lebaran Bersama Ikke Nurjanah (2003)
- Munafik (repackage album Lebaran Bersama Ikke Nurjanah) (2003)
- Dua Dalam Satu (2004)
- I Love Dut Kustik (2015)
