= Dreams (soundtrack) =

Dreams (Original Motion Picture Soundtrack)

Soundtrack album by Various artists
- Released: January 27, 2016
- Recorded: 2015
- Length: 38:18
- Label: Sony Music Entertainment Indonesia

Fatin Shidqia chronology
12 Lagu Islami Terbaik - Fatin & Friends (2014)	Dreams (Original Motion Picture Soundtrack) (2016)

Singles from Dreams (Original Motion Picture Soundtrack)
- 1. "Away" Released: September 16, 2015; 2. "Percaya" Released: January 13, 2016

Dreams (Original Motion Picture Soundtrack) is the soundtrack album to the 2016 Indonesian film titled Dreams. The album was released by Sony Music Entertainment Indonesia on January 27, 2016.

== Singles ==
The soundtrack was preceded by the release of two singles. "Away" was released as the album's lead single on September 16, 2015, peaked at top 40 on the Indonesia Itunes Chart and "Percaya" was released as the second single on January 13, 2016;, both of that songs performed by Fatin Shidqia.

== Track listing ==
No.	Title	Writer(s)	Performer(s)	Length
1.	"Away (English Version)"	Ylva Dimberg; Iggy Strange Dahl	Fatin Shidqia	3:11
2.	"Percaya (Reprise)"	id:Nadya Fatira	Fatin Shidqia	4:25
3.	"Diam Diam Emas"	Krosboi	Krosboi	2:53
4.	"Menggenggam Mimpi"	Nadya Fatira	Fatin Shidqia	4:21
5.	"Bersinar"	id:Ario Seto	id:Soulvibe	3:54
6.	"Away (Indonesian Version)"	Ario Seto	Fatin Shidqia	3:11
7.	"Nona Manis"	Krosboi	Krosboi	3:24
8.	"Percaya"	Nadya Fatira	Fatin Shidqia	4:27
9.	"Menggenggam Mimpi (Acoustic Version)"	Nadya Fatira	id:Ardina Rasti	4:19
10.	"Hidup Ini Indah"	Duhita Panchatantra; Simhala Avadana; Mahavira Wisnu Wardhana	id:Numata	4:13
Total length:				38:18
