= Don't Fail Me Now =

Single by Melanie Amaro
- B-side: "Love Me Now"
- Released: September 18, 2012
- Genre: Dance-pop
- Length: 4:21
- Label: Epic; Syco
- Songwriters: Olivia Waithe; Rodney Jerkins
- Producer: Darkchild

Melanie Amaro singles chronology
"Don't Fail Me Now" (2012)	"Long Distance" (2012)

Audio sample
- file; help

Music video
- "Don't Fail Me Now" on YouTube

"Don't Fail Me Now" is a song by American singer Melanie Amaro, the winner of the first season of The X Factor, set to be included on her debut studio album under the label Epic Records. Written by Livvi Franc and produced by Rodney Jerkins, the upbeat pop song features the singer talking about self empowerment and finding a true love. It was first made available for stream on July 31, 2012, and it was released to digital download on September 18, 2012 as Amaro's debut single along with the b-side song "Love Me Now". It received mixed reviews from music critics, who praised the vocal performance, but criticized the use of Auto-Tune. As of December 2012 "Don't Fail Me Now" has sold 20,000 copies in the United States, failing to chart on the Billboard Hot 100 but peaking in the top-ten of the Hot Dance Club Songs chart.

== Background and composition ==
"Don't Fail Me Now" was written by Livvi Franc and produced by Rodney Jerkins, and is the first song from her debut studio album on Epic Records. In an interview with Billboard, Amaro spoke that she "look for songs that are connected to real life scenarios -- love songs, breakups, getting hurt, finding the strength to keep on pushing in life." Described as "an uplifting account of Amaro's road to success", the upbeat pop track features the singer talking about self empowerment and finding a true love, which is perceived in lyrics such as "I've paid my dues, I've paid the price, I've prayed for you almost every night...I've walked the longest road so don't fail me now, feet don't fail me now." "Don't Fail Me Now" was made available to stream through her official SoundCloud account on July 31, 2012, and had been played over 175,000 times, as of 31 October 2012. The song was made available to other media outlets the following day. Amaro's manager Simon Cowell also released the single on TwitMusic, a service which lets users discover and share music uploaded by artists, also on August 1. After a week, "Don't Fail Me Now" garnered over 6,500 plays on the platform, making her one of the more popular singers there. The track was released on digital download on September 18, 2012.

== Reception ==
"Don't Fail Me Now" received mixed reviews from music critics. Gerrick Kennedy of Los Angeles Times gave the song a mixed review, saying Amaro's vocal performance and delivery was "flawless," but called the production and dance style "a complete misfire for a debut - especially when listeners haven't seen or heard Amaro since January and other finalists have already made splashes." He also criticized the lyrics, called them "bland" and "couldn't be interpreted as inspirational or romantic, depending on the listener." Entertainment Weekly contributor Grady Smith called it "a mismash, featuring a thumping club beat, soaring diva notes (some of which sound seemingly and unnecessarily Auto-Tuned), techno flourishes, and a bevvy of inspirational-slash-romantic lyrics. All of it leaves me a little confused - is she singing about her man, or The Man Upstairs?" Scott Shetler of Pop Crush rated it two and a half stars out of five, saying, "unfortunately, her first offering offers a rather bland dance-pop arrangement that doesn't flaunt her winning voice effectively." Idolator writer Becky Bain gave the song a negative review, explaining that the track lacked originality, exemplifying the use of "a techno breakdown thrown in for absolutely no reason other than to poorly follow the current trend. It also doesn't seem to know whether it's a love song or a self-empowerment anthem." Since its release, "Don't Fail Me Now" reached a peak of number 21 on Billboard's Hot Dance Club Songs component chart.

== Promotion ==
=== Music video ===
An accompanying music video for the song was directed by Benny Boom, who wanted to showcase Amaro's vision of the track. He explained, "When I first heard the song, I knew I wanted the video to have movement to it and be a journey. I thought of a clever way of taking her on this journey by using a rear-screen projector. She’s no longer the ‘X Factor’ contestant, she is the winner, and I wanted to make sure that we made a video that showed that." On October 19, 2012 Amaro premiered the music video for "Don't Fail Me Now" on her official VEVO account. The video features Amaro sitting at the park as her lover meets her and they go for a walk. As the story goes, she makes her way to a party with her friends, until her love interest meets her again and they dance to the track. The story intercuts with scenes of Amaro singing to the track stage with bright lights behind her. Lyndsey Parker of Yahoo commented that the music video "is actually not a fail" and added, "the ombre hair! The flamingo-pink lip lacquer! The curves! The cat-eyes! The giant hoop earrings! The signs of an actual personality! Melanie is working it here, and it all sort of works. The video is even making me like the single a little bit more, which is a good (and unexpected) thing."

=== In popular culture ===
Prior to the digital release of the song, "Don't Fail Me Now" was sampled during previews for the second season of The X Factor.

== Track listings ==
- Digital download
1. "Don't Fail Me Now" — 4:01
2. "Love Me Now" — 3:26
- Remix EP
1. "Don't Fail Me Now" (PaperCha$er Extended) — 6:10
2. "Don't Fail Me Now" (PaperCha$er Edit) — 4:06
3. "Don't Fail Me Now" (PaperCha$er Dub) — 6:10
4. "Don't Fail Me Now" (Ferry Corsten Remix) — 5:55
5. "Don't Fail Me Now" (Ferry Corsten Remix Radio Edit) — 3:13
6. "Don't Fail Me Now" (Ferry Corsten Remix Instrumental) — 5:55
7. "Don't Fail Me Now" (Flexican Extended) — 5:37
8. "Don't Fail Me Now" (Flexican Edit) — 3:45
9. "Don't Fail Me Now" (Sex Ray Vision Extended) — 5:49
10. "Don't Fail Me Now" (Sex Ray Vision Edit) — 4:09
11. "Don't Fail Me Now" (Sex Ray Vision Dub) — 5:49

== Chart performance ==
According to Nielsen SoundScan, "Don't Fail Me Now" is Amaro's second single to miss a spot on the main Billboard charts, after previous promotional single, a cover of Otis Redding's "Respect" sold 24,000 copies. As of December 2012, "Don't Fail Me Now" has sold 20,000 copies.

Chart (2012)	Peak position
US Hot Dance Club Songs (Billboard)	8

== Release history ==
Region	Date	Format	Label
United States	September 18, 2012	Digital download	Epic Records, Syco Music
