= Tears (Tyla song) =

Promotional single by Tyla
- Released: 20 November 2024
- Recorded: 2024
- Genre: Folk
- Length: 2:30
- Label: FAX; Epic
- Songwriters: Tyla Seethal; Mikkel S. Erksen; Tor Erik Hermansen; Michael Pollack; Theron Thomas; Livvi Franc
- Producer: Stargate

Promotional video
- ""Tears" Coke Studio Session" on YouTube

"Tears" is a song recorded by South African singer Tyla. It was released on 20 November 2024 by FAX and Epic Records. "Tears" was written by Tyla, Theron Thomas, Michael Pollack, Livvi Franc and its producers Mikkel S. Eriksen and Tor Erik Hermansen of Stargate. The acoustic folk ballad focuses on Tyla connecting with her inner empath and was recorded in 2024 in collaboration with Coca-Cola's Coke Studio. A video for the Coke Studio Session of the song premiered the same day. The song was referred to by Jon Pareles of The New York Times as a departure from her signature amapiano-R&B sound.

== Background, composition and promotion ==
"Tears"
A 15-second sample of "Tears" by Tyla, where the chorus is heard, an acoustic folk sentimental ballad which deviates from her signature amapiano and contemporary R&B sound.

Speaking to Nylon, Tyla explained the song came about after songwriter Michael Pollack started strumming a beat on the guitar, Stargate then added production. She also claimed she had co-written the song for her studio album Tyla but did not think it would fit on it as the contemporary folk track deviates from her signature amapiano pop-R&B sound. She exclaimed she was so happy to finally release it in partnership with Coke Studio. The song is a sentimental ballad with an acoustic riff. Tyla stated, "it's centered around love and seeing someone you love go through something, and you take all that on yourself. It's a really important message".

Josh Burke, Coca-Cola's Global Head of Music and Marketing stated that Tyla's uplifting sound and worldwide influence perfectly captured the essence of Coke Studio and that he was excited for people to hear her single, ‘Tears', she'd be releasing in partnership with them. To promote the song, a Coke Studio session in partnership with Coca-Cola's Coke Studio was released the same day as the single on 20 November 2024. The video, described as calming and relaxing features Tyla surrounded by three other female vocalists with comforting visuals, allowing viewers to resonate deeper with the song's heartfelt lyrics.

== Critical reception ==
The New York Times' Jon Parales referred to "Tears" as a compassionate folk ballad featuring an acoustic guitar that deviates from her amapiano and R&B material. Heran Mamo of Billboard described it as an acoustic driven tune for anyone that needs a "shoulder to cry on". Uproxx's Derrick Rossignol expressed it as Tyla taking on a loved one's burden, while Mbali Mbatha of City Press cited it as a refreshing track which showcases her vocal versatility.

== Credits and personnel ==
Credits are adapted from the digital liner notes.

Musicians

- Tyla – lead vocals, performer, songwriter
- Divine Lightbody – background vocals, arranger
- Mikkel S. Erksen – songwriter
- Tor Erik Hermansen – songwriter
- Michael Pollack – songwriter
- Theron Thomas – songwriter
- Livvi Franc – songwriter
- Matthew Burnett – arranger
- Stargate – producer

Technical

- Oscar Cornejo – recording, mixing and mastering engineer

== Charts ==
Chart performance for "Tears"
Chart (2024)	Peak position
UK Afrobeats (OCC)	11

== Release history ==
Release dates and formats for "Tears"
Region	Date	Format	Label	Ref.
Various	20 November 2024	Digital download; streaming	FAX; Epic	
