= Now I'm That Bitch =

Single by Livvi Franc featuring Pitbull
- Released: 19 June 2009
- Recorded: 2008
- Genre: Electro-R&B; dance-pop
- Length: 3:45
- Label: RCA/Jive Label Group
- Songwriters: Armando Pérez; Olivia Waithe; Salaam Gibbs
- Producer: Salaam Remi

Livvi Franc singles chronology
| "Free" (2008) | "Now I'm That Bitch" (2009) | "Automatik" (2010) |

Pitbull singles chronology
| "Hotel Room Service" (2009) | "Now I'm That Bitch" (2009) | "Outta Control" (2009) |

"Now I'm That Bitch" is the debut single by Barbadian British singer-songwriter Livvi Franc, released on 13 June 2009 by Jive Records. It features guest vocals from American rapper Pitbull. The artists co-wrote the song with its producer Salaam Remi. "Now I'm That Bitch" received mixed reviews from contemporary critics, who considered it as an empowering anthem, despite criticizing its composition.

"Now I'm That Bitch" achieved moderate success, reaching number 24 in New Zealand and 40 in the United Kingdom. In the United States, the song failed to enter the Billboard Hot 100, peaking at number 14 on the Bubbling Under Hot 100 Singles; however, it reached number one on Billboard's Hot Dance Club Songs. An accompanying music video was directed by Sarah Chatfield, and portrays Franc singing and dancing to the song along with female and male dancers. The music video was compared to the one of Rachel Stevens' "Sweet Dreams My LA Ex" (2003).

== Background ==
"Now I'm That Bitch"
A 22 second sample of the song's chorus, which features Franc singing empowering lyrics over an electro-R&B and dance-pop background.

"Now I'm That Bitch" was written and produced by Salaam Gibbs, with additional writing from Olivia Waithe and Armando Pérez. Franc considered the song "very personal for me - because it really represents who I am." She also commented that "everyone has different meanings for the word 'bitch'. And for me I really wanted to reclaim it and make it something empowering - as in 'Babe In Total Control of Herself'! You know, it's all about being in control and knowing what you want. And the story behind the song relates to when I was younger, and I was a lot quieter and less confident." The song was released as Franc's debut single on 19 June 2009. A digital EP titled Now I'm That... Remixes was released on 23 June 2009, while a physical edition featuring different remixes was also released.

== Reception ==
=== Critical response ===
"Now I'm That Bitch" received mixed reviews from contemporary critics. A Billboard review considered the song as "an empowering anthem in which the singer claims 'bitch' to be an acronym for 'being in total control of herself'", while commenting Franc sings the lines "You were too fly then, so fly away now" with "an aggressive, feisty vocal". Pitbull's verses were also praised, being considered as "forceful and energetic rhymes". Nick Levine of Digital Spy gave the song a mixed review, commenting that "calling your debut single 'Now I'm That Bitch' is a crass but effective way for a pop starlet to grab our attention - even if she proceeds to cushion the blow by claiming it's an acronym for 'Being In Total Control Of Herself', and even if 'Bitch' has to become 'Chick for the purposes of daytime radio." However, Levine noted "the track itself doesn't quite live up to its risqué title", describing its lyrics as "sassy enough" and its composition as "a fairly standard slab of electro-R&B complete with box-ticking cameo from Pitbull. Aside from the cuss word, the only intrigue comes from trying to work out whether Franc actually sings 'I'm not a bender' on the second verse." Pip Ellwood of Entertainment Focus said "Now I’m That Bitch" "isn’t a good single. Livvi Franc is not the next big thing", while describing the song basically as a "modern R&B/pop by numbers. Take Rihanna’s vocal (with a less able singer), steal Rachel Stevens' 'Sweet Dreams My LA Ex' video and put in some awful lyrics and apparently you have a pop smash."

=== Chart performance ===
On the week of 14 September 2009, "Now I'm That Bitch" debuted at number 30 on the New Zealand Singles Chart. After six weeks, the song reached number 24, its highest peak on the chart. In the United Kingdom, the song debuted at number 40, and stayed on the UK Singles Chart for three weeks. In the United States, "Now I'm That Bitch" reached number one on Billboard's Hot Dance Club Songs on the week of 11 July 2009; it failed, however, to enter the Billboard Hot 100, peaking at number 14 on the Bubbling Under Hot 100 Singles.

== Music video and usage in media ==
The music video for "Now I'm That Bitch" was directed by Sarah Chatfield, in Miami, Florida, during the week of 16 July 2009. The video begins with Pitbull's rap the song's intro, followed by Franc being joined by two girls dancing. As the chorus starts, she is seen dancing in a revealing black catsuit reeling in two men with a red silk rope like scarf. The following scenes includes Franc lying on top of men placed together as a chair, singing in a metallic silver and black mini dress with sunglasses; dancing while reeling in and pushing their men away; with two long yellow cloths covering her nude body and is also seen moving around on red silk. The music video was released on 10 August 2009 on MTV, and has been compared to the one of Rachel Stevens' "Sweet Dreams My LA Ex" (2003). A second version titled "Now I'm That Chick Part II" features a censored version of the song, replacing the word "bitch" with "chick", and also removing Pitbull's verses and scenes. This version was released on Franc's VEVO on 22 March 2011. Following its release as a single, "Now I'm That Bitch" was featured in episode 10 of The CW's Melrose Place, as well as on the fifth season of MTV's The Hills, during a scene where Kristin Cavallari tells Jayde off and leaves the restaurant.

== Track listings ==
- Digital download
1. "Now I'm That Bitch" – 3:44
- Digital EP
1. "Now I'm That Bitch Part II" (Jason Nevins Club) – 6:35
2. "Now I'm That Chick Part II" (Kaskade Radio) – 3:34
3. "Now I'm That Bitch Part II" (DiscoTech Remix) – 4:17
4. "Now I'm That Chick Part II" (Sam Sparro Remix) – 4:25
- CD single
1. "Now I'm That Bitch" (Kaskade Mix Extended) – 6:06
2. "Now I'm That Bitch" (Jason Nevins Club) – 6:35
3. "Now I'm That Bitch" (Sam Sparro Remix) – 4:24
4. "Now I'm That Bitch" (DiscoTech Remix) – 4:17
5. "Now I'm That Bitch" (Mike Rizzo Funk Generation Club Mix) – 7:30
6. "Now I'm That Bitch" (Serafin Remix) – 3:30

== Credits and personnel ==
Credits for "Now I'm That Bitch" are adapted from the single's liner notes.

- Livvi Franc – songwriting, lead vocals, background vocals
- Salaam Remi – producer, keyboards, drums, vocal arrangement
- Staybent Krunk-A-Delic – keyboards
- John Hanes – audio engineering
- Tim Roberts – audio engineering
- Tom Coyne – audio mastering
- Serban Ghenea – audio mixing
- Franklin "Emmanuel" Socorro – vocal recording
- Gleyder "Gee" Disla – vocal recording

== See also ==
- List of number-one dance singles of 2009 (U.S.)

== Charts ==
=== Weekly charts ===
| Chart (2009) | Peak position |
|---|---|
| New Zealand (Recorded Music NZ) | 24 |
| Scottish Singles Sales (Official Charts) | 40 |
| UK Singles (Official Charts) | 40 |
| US Bubbling Under Hot 100 (Billboard) | 14 |
| US Heatseekers Songs (Billboard) | 24 |
| US Pop Airplay (Billboard) | 37 |
| US Pop 100 Airplay (Billboard) | 60 |
| US Rhythmic Airplay (Billboard) | 31 |
| US Dance Club Songs (Billboard) | 1 |

=== Year-end charts ===
| Chart (2009) | Position |
|---|---|
| US Hot Dance Club Songs (Billboard) | 49 |

== Release history ==
Release dates and formats for "Now I'm That Bitch"
| Region | Date | Format | Label(s) | Ref. |
|---|---|---|---|---|
| United States | June 15, 2009 | Mainstream airplay | Jive | |
