= Nindy Ayunda =

Indonesian singer

- Genres: Pop; R&B; Soul; teen pop
- Occupation: Singer
- Years active: 2006–present
- Labels: Sony Music Indonesia, Columbia Records, Epic Records

Nindy Ayunda is an Indonesian singer.

== Career ==
=== Music career ===
Nindy was elected as the first winner from West Sumatra. Due to her talent, Nindy sang at the Embassy of Malaysia. Nindy also won the duet contest with Audy which was held by one of beauty products and joined in singing a song called "Untuk Sahabat" for the album 23-03.

In 2007, Nindy sang "Matahari", a song on the album Ost. Badai Pasti Berlalu. Nindy collaborated with a vocal group Bragi to sing a song titled Tidur Malam Ini on their most recent album, The Best of Bragi.

Her 2008 debut solo album was titled Tak Pernah Kubayangkan. Her victory in the contest Olay Duet with Audy in 2006 inspired her to enter the entertainment world.

Her first song, entitled "Buktikan" was very successful. The lyrics were "easy listening". It reached No. 1 in radio airplay for five weeks. Her second song "Cinta Cuma Satu" was also successful holding first position on the radio airplay for six weeks. Nindy was female singer number No. 2 on Indonesian MTV in 2009, behind Bunga Citra Lestari, and fourth overall behind Bunga Citra Lestari, Ungu and J-Rocks.

== Discography ==
=== Studio albums ===
- Tak Pernah Kubayangkan (2008)

=== Singles ===
- 23-03 single "Untuk Sahabat" (2006)
- Ost. Badai Pasti Berlalu single "Matahari" (2007)
- The Best of Bragi duet "Tidur Malam Ini" (2007)
- "Ost. Seleb Kota Jogja (SKJ)" duet with Human Band "Jangan Lama-Lama" (2010)
- "Setulus Hati" with Lala Karmela and Terry
- "Cinta Cuma Satu"

== Filmography ==
- Seleb Kota Jogja (SKJ) (2010)
- Pengantin Cinta (2010)

== Personal life ==
Ayunda gave birth to a child in 2012.
