= Livvi Franc =

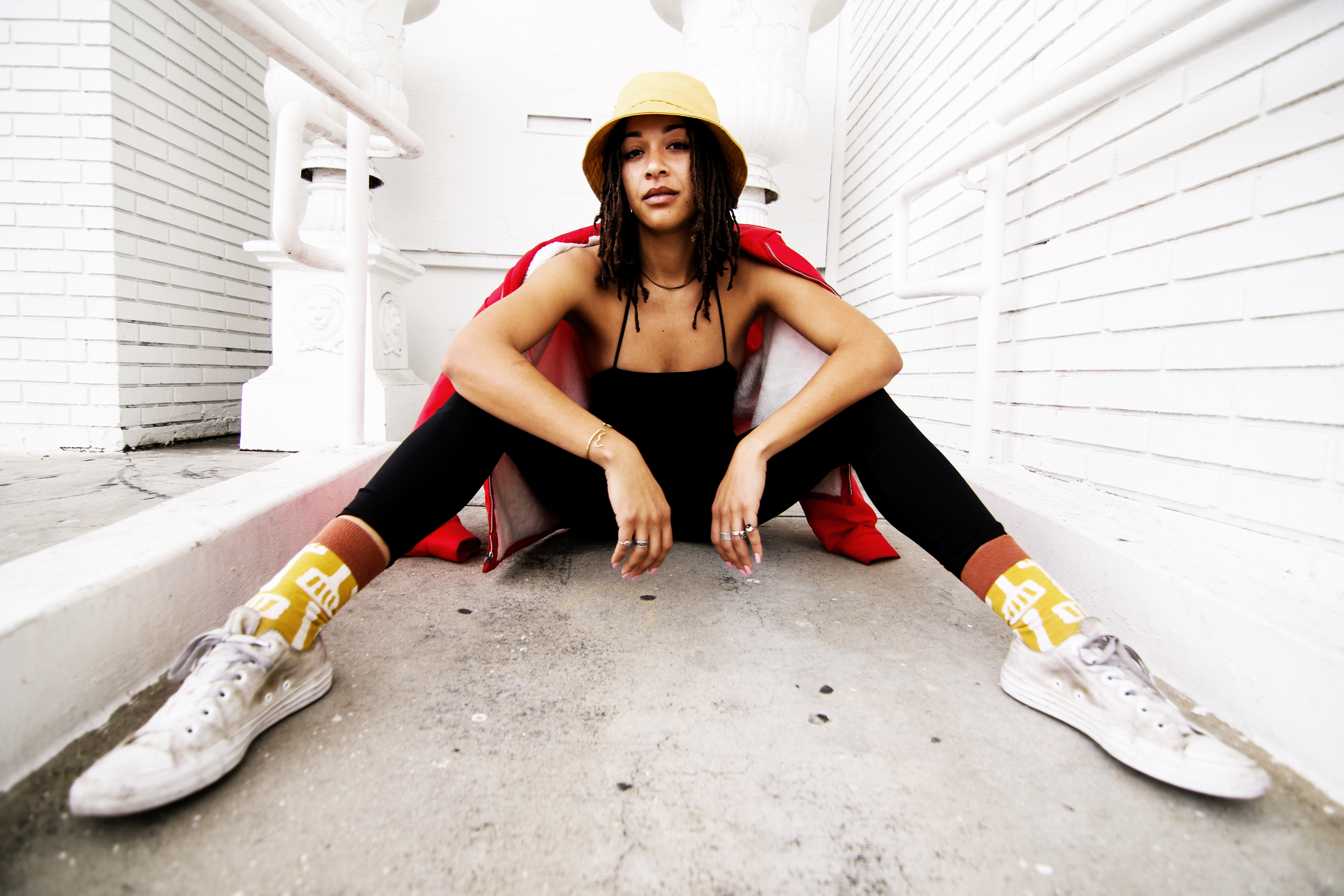
- Franc in Los Angeles in 2019

Background information
- Also known as: Ei8ht
- Born: Olivia Charlotte Waithe; 31 May 1988 (age 38); Harrogate, North Yorkshire, England
- Origin: Barbados
- Genres: Pop; R&B; dance; reggae
- Occupations: Singer; songwriter; producer
- Years active: 2007–present
- Labels: Beluga Heights; Warner Bros.
- Website: www.livvifranc.com

Olivia Charlotte Waithe (born 31 May 1988), better known by her stage name Livvi Franc or Ei8ht, is a Barbadian British singer and songwriter.

== Early life ==
Franc, Ei8ht was born in Harrogate, North Yorkshire, England to an English mother and a Bajan father. Franc's stage name was inspired by her late maternal grandfather, Frank Wilson, she explained to Flavour Magazine that he had "noticed me playing the piano and predicted I was going to be a musician. Sadly he’s no longer here. So, in honour of him, I called myself Livvi Franc; Livvi because it’s my nickname, and Franc because it’s a funkier version of Frank." When Franc was five, the family moved to Barbados, because her parents decided that their daughters, Franc and her elder sister, should experience their Barbadian heritage. They would return to England during the summer holidays. Franc wrote her first song at age eleven and learned the guitar at fifteen and sang in school talent shows and pageants growing up.

== Career ==
Franc's first manager discovered her when a friend of Franc's who babysitted for her gave her one of Franc's cassette tape demos. Franc then went on to record proper demos in studio in Barbados and Miami, where she met her next manager. Soon after, she was in New York meeting label heads and auditioning. She finally signed with Jive Records, after months of negotiations, after singing an Etta James song for them. Prior to signing with Jive, Franc had gone through three years of artist development and attended workshops on it. She had attended Queens College in Barbados. Jordin Sparks recorded a song written by Livvi Franc, "Walking on Snow", Franc has also written for Cheryl Cole, Kelly Clarkson, Marié Digby, Michael Jackson, Britney Spears, Rihanna and Cher Lloyd.

Franc's debut single, "Now I'm That Bitch" was released in the summer of 2009. The song topped the US Billboard Hot Dance Club Songs chart and became a top 40 hit in New Zealand and the UK. Another song, "This Is a Raid" appeared on the reboot of Melrose Place. Franc released her second single named "Automatik". Produced by RedOne, the single peaked at #6 on the US Hot Dance Club Songs chart. During the end of 2010, the album was eventually shelved by Jive and so Livvi left Jive Records, however quickly signed to Beluga Heights/Warner Bros., where she was to finish her debut album. In a UStream session, Franc said she was delaying working on her own album and instead was focusing on writing for other acts.

In 2023, she went by the stage name "Ei8ht" and was featured in the soundtrack for the film Spider-Man: Across the Spider-Verse, with her song "Silk & Cologne", featuring Offset.

Since then, she has also released a single called "Rah" at the end of 2023.

in 2024, she proceeded to release her follow-up single "SHINE!"

== Influences ==
Franc has listed Nelly Furtado, Alicia Keys, Alanis Morissette as her influences and System of a Down as one of her favourite bands saying: "I listen to everything. On my iPod I have Santigold, La Roux, Nelly Furtado, some soca, and some reggae and some country music." Her debut album reflects her diverse musical influences; she said: |It’s all the different sides of me come together… There are a couple of tracks with a little reggae vibe, some with more of a UK or retro vibe. It’s different and it all falls into place."

== Discography ==
=== Extended plays ===
Title	Album details
Underground Sunshine – Album Sampler	Released: 2009; Label: RCA, Sony; Formats: Promo CD
Livvi Franc	Released: 2010; Label: RCA, Sony; Formats: Promo CD

Underground Sunshine – Album Sampler
No.	Title	Length
1.	"Free"	5:07
2.	"This Is a Raid"	3:44
3.	"Now I'm That Bitch (featuring Pitbull)"	3:45
4.	"Hummingbird"	3:51
5.	"She Loves Love"	3:17

Livvi Franc
No.	Title	Length
1.	"Now I'm That Bitch (featuring Pitbull)"	3:45
2.	"Automatik"	2:52
3.	"This Is a Raid"	3:39
4.	"Hummingbird"	3:52
5.	"She Loves Love"	3:18

=== Singles ===
Year	Title	Peak chart positions				
Year	Title	UK	NZ	US	US Dance	
2008	"Free" ^{[a]}	—	—	—	—	
2009	"Now I'm That Bitch" (featuring Pitbull)	40	24	114	1	
2010	"Automatik"	—	—	—	6	
2010	"Nobody Loves Me"	—	—	—	—	
2023	"Rah"	—	—	—	—	
2024	"Shine!'	_	_	_	_	"—" denotes a single that did not chart or was not released.

Notes

- ^{^a} signifies promotional single

=== Other appearances ===
Year	Title	Appearance	Notes
2009	"Overboard" (Marié Digby featuring Livvi Franc)	Breathing Underwater	Appears as featured vocalist and co-writer
2012	"Warning Shot" (MGK featuring Cassie)	Lace Up	Appears as a backing vocalist
2014	"Through the Blinds" (Simon Pipe featuring Livvi Franc)	-	Appears as a featured vocalist
2015	"I Could Do This Every Night" (Tinie Tempah featuring Livvi Franc)	Junk Food	Appears as a featured vocalist
2017	"In the Dark" (Wilkinson featuring Livvi Franc)	Hypnotic	Appears as a featured vocalist
2026	"How to Pray" (Dahi featuring Amber Mark and Kendrick Lamar)	Black Boy (Alternative)	Background vocals

=== Songwriting credits ===
Year	Artist	Appearance	Title
2008	Michael Jackson	—	"Give Me Your Love"
2009	Cheryl Cole	3 Words	"Rain on Me"
2009	Jordin Sparks	Battlefield	"Walking on Snow"
2011	Britney Spears	Femme Fatale	"Trouble for Me"
2011	DJ Khaled	We the Best Forever	"It Ain't Over 'til It's Over"
2011	Jason Derulo	Future History	"Pick Up the Pieces"
2011	Kelly Clarkson	Stronger	"The War Is Over"
2011	Cher Lloyd	Sticks + Stones	"Dub on the Track"
2011	Cher Lloyd	Sticks + Stones	"Love Me for Me"
2012	Melanie Amaro	Truly	"Don't Fail Me Now"
2012	Melanie Amaro	Truly	"Did I Ever"
2012	Gravity 5	How to Rock (Soundtrack)	"Hey Now"
2012	Delta Goodrem	Child of the Universe	"When My Stars Come Out"
2012	Leona Lewis	Glassheart	"Shake You Up"
2012	2AM Club	Moon Tower	"Mary"
2012	Ciara	Shelved/Unreleased Ciara Sessions	"Got Me Good"
2012	Ciara	Shelved/Unreleased Ciara Sessions	"Insomniac"
2012	Ciara	Shelved/Unreleased Ciara Sessions	"Standing Alone"
2012	Ciara	Shelved/Unreleased Ciara Sessions	"Wash Away"
2012	Christina Aguilera	Lotus	"Red Hot Kinda Love"
2012	Rihanna	Unapologetic	"What Now"
2012	Laza Morgan	Non-album single	"Gimme Little"
2013	Demi Lovato	Demi	"Two Pieces"
2013	Jessica Sanchez	Me, You & the Music	"Don't Come Around"
2013	Ciara	Ciara	"Read My Lips"
2013	Ciara	Ciara	"Overdose"
2013	Selena Gomez	Stars Dance	"Save the Day"
2013	Zendaya	Zendaya	"Bottle You Up"
2013	Kelly Clarkson	Wrapped in Red	"4 Carats"
2013	Luminites	Non-album single	"Do Something"
2014	Tone Damli	Heartkill	"Perfect World"
2014	Shakira	Shakira	"That Way"
2014	Alexa Goddard	Non-album single	"So There"
2015	Ciara	Jackie	"One Woman Army"
2015	Demi Lovato	Confident	"Old Ways"
2016	Brooke Candy	Daddy Issues	"Happy Days"
2017	Zara Larsson	So Good	"What They Say"
2021	Coldplay	Music of the Spheres	“Let Somebody Go” with Selena Gomez
2021	BamBam	Who Are You (feat. Seulgi of Red Velvet)	"Who Are You"
2022	Jackson Wang	Magic Man (Jackson Wang Album)	"Dopamine"
2022	Jennifer Lopez & Maluma	Marry Me (soundtrack)	"Marry Me"
2024	Tyla	Non-album single	"Tears"
2024	Coldplay	Moon Music	"Jupiter"
2025	Ellie Goulding	Non-album single	"Destiny"
2026	Katseye	Non-album single	"Internet Girl"
2026	Absolutely	Paracosm	"Elevator"
2026	BTS	Arirang	"Normal"
2026	Sean Paul and Stalk Ashley	Non-album single	"Ready for the Ride"
2026	India Shawn	Subject to Change	"Rain on Me"
2026	Nia Archives	Emotional Junglist	"Around Tha Bend"
2026	Nia Archives	Emotional Junglist	"Danger"
2026	Nia Archives	Emotional Junglist	"Vertical"
2026	Nia Archives	Emotional Junglist	"This Could Be..."
2026	Nia Archives	Emotional Junglist	"Superlust"
2026	Adéla	Prima	"Fantasize"
2026	Tinashe	Popstar	"Cloud 9"
2026	Jennie	Fallen Angel	"Face"

=== Music videos ===
Year	Single	Director
2008	"Free"	Laurent Briet
2009	"Now I'm That Bitch" (featuring Pitbull)	Sarah Chatfield
2009	"Now I'm That Chick"	Sarah Chatfield
2010	"Automatik"	Malcom Jones
