= Aku Memilih Setia =

Single by Fatin Shidqia

from the album For You
- Released: May 17, 2013
- Recorded: 2013
- Genre: Pop
- Length: 4:37
- Label: Sony Music
- Songwriter: M. Fredy Harahap
- Producer: M. Fredy Harahap

Fatin Shidqia singles chronology
"Aku Memilih Setia" (2013)	"KekasihMu" (2013)

Music video
- "Aku Memilih Setia" on YouTube

"Aku Memilih Setia" is a song performed by singer Fatin Shidqia. It is her debut single and is featured on her debut album titled For You was released in November 2013. The single was released in Indonesia on 17 May 2013.

== Background ==
During a performance in the Grand Final of the first season of X Factor Indonesia on 17 May 2013, the finalist who made it to the Finale will sing their winner song. Fatin and Novita Dewi advanced to The Finale beating Nu Dimension to elimination. Fatin for the first time would sing her song "Aku Memilih Setia" at the end of the show. The single was released digitally via iTunes on 17 May 2013. The track was released on 600 radio all around Indonesia on 31 May 2013.

== Music videos ==
On 11 June 2013, Fatin said that the music video for the single had been filmed. The video was filmed in Depok, West Java. The video was filmed at the Zoe Cafe & Library, Margonda Street. In the music video, Fatin wore a light brown dress. The video was about a girl who was dating a bookstore keeper, and the girl always came there as she had fallen in love with the boy deeply. But as his boss knew that he was dating the girl, he was fired. The girl returns to her ex-boyfriend and chooses to be faithful. On 28 June 2013, the music video "Aku Memilih Setia" for the first time was premiered in Concert Super X on RCTI.

== Live performances ==
The track was performed live for the first time on 17 May 2013 at the Grand Final and on 24 May 2013 at The Result of the first season of X Factor Indonesia. On 28 May 2013 on Hitam Putih. Fatin Shidqia performed the song on Anugerah Musik Indonesia 2013 on 2 July 2013. Other appearances will include on 5 July 2013 on Satu Jam Lebih Dekat on "TvOne". On 24 August 2013 on X Factor Around the World, Fatin performed "Aku Memilih Setia" on her solo performance. and Fatin sang at many Music shows like Dahsyat and 100% Ampuh.

== Track listing ==
Digital download
No.	Title	Length
1.	"Aku Memilih Setia"	4:40

== Awards and nominations ==
Year	Award	Category	Result
2013	Expose Awards	Song of The Year	Won
2014	Dahsyatnya Awards	Lagu Terdahsyat (Best Song)	Nominated
2014	Global Seru Awards	Lagu Paling Seru ("Aku Memilih Setia")	Nominated
2014	Anugerah Musik Indonesia	Best Pop Female Solo Artist	Won
2014	Anugerah Planet Muzik	Best Newcomer Female Artist	Nominated

== Chart performance ==
Chart (2014)	Peak position
Top 30 Singles Chart Indonesia	28
