= X Factor Around the World =

- Created by: Simon Cowell
- Directed by: Agung Cahyono
- Presented by: Robby Purba
- Judges: Paula Abdul; Anggun; Daniel Bedingfield; Ahmad Dhani; Louis Walsh
- Country of origin: Indonesia
- Original languages: English; Indonesian

Production
- Executive producers: Fabian Dharmawan; Glenn Sims
- Running time: 240 minutes
- Production companies: RCTI; FremantleMedia Asia

Original release
- Network: RCTI
- Release: 24 August 2013

X Factor Around the World is the 24th anniversary television special of RCTI, joining four continents' biggest versions of The X Factor reality singing competition—X Factor Indonesia (Asia), The X Factor USA (America), The X Factor UK (Europe) and The X Factor Australia (Australia). The show was originally aired on 24 August 2013 in Indonesia and featured performances by six winners and runners-up: Melanie Amaro, Samantha Jade, The Collective, Jahmene Douglas, Fatin Shidqia, Novita Dewi.

The judging panel consisted of Paula Abdul, Anggun, Daniel Bedingfield, Ahmad Dhani and Louis Walsh. The TV special was produced by Fabian Dharmawan for RCTI and Glenn Sims for Fremantle Media, who were also the executive producers of X Factor Indonesia. The show was purely a music showcase and no winner was announced. The special episode was a smash hit completely destroying the competition from rival broadcaster SCTV who were also playing their own birthday celebrations on the same evening. For a programme broadcast 95% in English language this was a significant achievement that led to the pan-regional Asia's Got Talent, produced exclusively by Fremantle Media.

== Performances ==
Segment 1: Victory Song

- Samantha Jade (X Factor Australia) – "What You've Done to Me"
- Novita Dewi (X Factor Indonesia) – "Sampai Habis Air Mataku"
- Fatin Shidqia (X Factor Indonesia) – "Aku Memilih Setia"
- The Collective (X Factor Australia) – "Surrender"
- Jahméne Douglas (X Factor UK) – "Titanium"
- Melanie Amaro (X Factor USA) – "Long Distance"

Judge Performance

- Daniel Bedingfield (Judge of X Factor New Zealand) – "Every Little Thing" / "If You're Not the One"
- Anggun (Judge of X Factor Indonesia) – "Mimpi" / "In Your Mind"
- Anggun featuring Kotak (Indonesian rock band) – "Pelan Pelan Saja" / "We Will Rock You"

Segment 2: Duet

- Novita Dewi and Fatin Shidqia – "Set Fire to the Rain" / "I Just Can't Stop Loving You"
- Novita Dewi and Jahméne Douglas – "Halo"
- Fatin Shidqia and The Collective – "Payphone"
- Novita Dewi and Samantha Jade – "Breakeven"
- Fatin Shidqia and Melanie Amaro – "The World's Greatest"

Closing Performance

- X Factor Indonesia finalists – Mega Hits of Ahmad Dhani medley

== Ratings ==
Official Indonesian television ratings
| Air date | Rating | Share | Daily rank |
|---|---|---|---|
| 24 August 2013 (live broadcast) | 5.0 | 25.4 | 1 |
| 25 August 2013 (repeat) | 2.1 | 17.5 | 12 |
