= Coboy Junior: The Movie =

Coboy Junior The Movie
- Theatrical release poster
- Directed by: Anggy Umbara
- Produced by: Hb Naveen dan Frederica
- Starring: Coboy Junior
- Cinematography: Aldo
- Edited by: Iyus
- Music by: Coboy Junior
- Production companies: Falcon Films; Carolco Pictures; Cinergi Pictures
- Distributed by: Falcon Films; Thorn EMI Screen Entertainment
- Release date: June 5, 2013
- Country: Indonesia
- Language: Indonesian
- Budget: $300,000
- Box office: $19,364 (Indonesian only)

Coboy Junior The Movie is a 2013 Indonesian movie. This movie stars Coboy Junior, Nirina Zubir, Dewi Sandra and Meisya Siregar. The film was released in June 2013.

Coboy Junior The Movie was filmed with $300.000 budget, But received negative reviews and poor performance in the box office, grossing $19,364 in Indonesia and $5,875 in non-Indonesian countries. This film was not released in North America.

== Plot ==
The story of the struggle Coboy Junior (Bastian, Iqbal, Aldi, Kiki) teenage singing group, singing and dance competition in Indonesia. The competition is not only just a means of proving themselves to be the best, but also be an important process to the point of maturity, character formation, and the determination of priorities in life choices and their respective personnel.

Bastian must be a person who can tighten friends. His dancing abilities to be an important point. Iqbal must determine the priority in determining the goals and tasks of his life at the time questioned by the father. Aldi, should be able to split the focus between her friendship with Junior Coboy Lovely and compactness. And Ford continues to provide input for the betterment of their group. In fact, when Kiki gets calamities that threaten the sustainability of the group in the competition.

Their toughest rivals, Superboyz and The Bangs continue Coboy Junior wanted to drop by all means.
