= Cahaya Di Langit Itu =

Single by Fatin Shidqia

from the album For You
- Released: November 22, 2013
- Recorded: 2013
- Genre: Pop
- Length: 4:43
- Label: Sony Music
- Songwriter(s): Nukke Kusumadewi
- Producer(s): M. Fredy Harahap

Fatin Shidqia singles chronology
"Dia Dia Dia" (2013)	"Cahaya Di Langit Itu" (2013)	"Jangan Kau Bohong" (2014)

Music video
- "Cahaya Di Langit Itu" on YouTube

"Cahaya Di Langit Itu" is a song performed by singer Fatin Shidqia. This single featured on her debut album titled For You. The single was released in Indonesia on 22 November 2013 and became the original soundtrack for the movie 99 Cahaya di Langit Eropa (99 Lights in the European Sky).

== Music video ==
Video Clip of this song was made while Fatin was shooting a scene for a film titled 99 Cahaya di Langit Eropa. The location of this video clip was shot in the city of Vienna, Austria. This video clip was officially released by Sony Music Entertainment Indonesia through YouTube account on November 22, 2013.

== Track listing ==
Digital download

1. Cahaya di Langit Itu - 4:39

== Awards and nominations ==
Year	Type	Award	Result
2014	Cinemags Readers Choice Award 2014	Favorite Soundtrack	Won
