= Dia Dia Dia =

Single by Fatin Shidqia

from the album For You
- Released: November 7, 2013
- Recorded: 2013
- Genre: Pop
- Length: 4:23
- Label: Sony Music
- Songwriter(s): M. Fredy Harahap
- Producer(s): M. Fredy Harahap

Fatin Shidqia singles chronology
| "KekasihMu" (2013) | "Dia Dia Dia" (2013) | "Cahaya Di Langit Itu" (2013) |

Music video
- "Dia Dia Dia" on YouTube

"Dia Dia Dia" is a song performed by singer Fatin Shidqia. It is her second single and featured on her debut album titled For You was released in November 2013. The single was released in Indonesia on 7 November 2013. This single was released with a music video on YouTube. The song also became a part of Cinta album by various Indonesian singers in February 2014.

== Music videos ==
On 15 October 2013, Fatin said that she finished filming her new music video. That music video was filmed in Vienna, Austria, and Paris, France. Fatin filmed this music video coinciding with filmed 99 Cahaya di Langit Eropa, in which she a special appearance. Fatin says that this song is about someone to is abandoned by her lover.

== Live performances ==
On 16 November 2013, Fatin sang "Dia Dia Dia" live for the first time on Dahsyat. Fatin also sings the song on her many live performances and off-air.

== Track listing ==
Digital download

1. Dia Dia Dia - 4:23

== Awards and nominations ==
| Year | Award | Category | Result |
|---|---|---|---|
| 2014 | Anugerah Planet Muzik | Most Popular Song | Won |

== Charts ==
| Chart (2013) | Peak position |
|---|---|
| Indonesian Digital Singles Chart | 16 |
