= Love Me Now (Melanie Amaro song) =

Song by Melanie Amaro
- A-side: "Don't Fail Me Now"
- Released: September 18, 2012
- Genre: R&B
- Length: 3:26
- Label: Epic; Syco
- Songwriters: Kenneth Coby; Crystal Johnson; Christopher "Tricky" Stewart
- Producers: Tricky Stewart; Soundz

"Love Me Now" is a song by American singer Melanie Amaro, the winner of the first season of The X Factor. It is a contemporary R&B ballad was written and produced by Christopher "Tricky" Stewart, while additional songwriting was done by Kenneth Coby and Crystal Johnson. Lyrically, Amaro wants her man to stop wasting time and enjoy time with her while they have it. It was first made available for stream on August 16, 2012, and it was digitally released as the b-side to Amaro's debut single "Don't Fail Me Now" on September 18, 2012. It received mostly positive reviews from music critics, who deemed it a better offering than "Don't Fail Me Now". "Love Me Now" failed to enter on any of the main Billboard component charts.

== Background and composition ==
"Love Me Now" was written and produced by Christopher "Tricky" Stewart, while additional songwriting was done by Kenneth Coby and Crystal Johnson. In an interview with Billboard, Amaro spoke that she "look for songs that are connected to real life scenarios -- love songs, breakups, getting hurt, finding the strength to keep on pushing in life." "Love Me Now" is a mid-tempo R&B ballad with a minimalist beat and production, which, according to Jessica Sager of Pop Crush, allows the singer's vocals to "shine". Lyrically, Amaro wants her man to stop wasting time and enjoy time with her while they have it, singing, "Boy, drop the world and love me now/ Hurry up boy, you're waiting too long / Listen to the urgency in this tone." The song was released to stream on August 16, 2012, being released for digital download on September 18, 2012 along with "Don't Fail Me Now".

== Critical reception ==
"Love Me Now" received mostly positive reviews from music critics. Armando Tinoco of Terra deemed it "a much stronger tune" than Amaro's debut single, "Don't Fail Me Now", and added that "we can hear her potential and vocal range much better." Pop Crush contributor Jessica Sager found the track "a better fit for Amaro's larger-than-life voice than its predecessors," while Rap-Up reviewer commented that the singer "shows off her powerful pipes" in "Love Me Now", and noted that she "yearns for some lovin' on the soulful ballad." Becky Bain of Idolator gave a negative review to the track, saying that "it's another personality-lacking, repetitive slow jam where she's practically belting the whole song. Can someone please save this girl's career before it starts?"

== Track listing ==
- Digital download
1. "Don't Fail Me Now" — 4:01
2. "Love Me Now" — 3:26

== Chart performance ==
"Love Me Now" was released as the b-side to Amaro's debut single "Don't Fail Me Now", which as of December 2012 has sold approximately 20,000 copies.

Chart (2012)	Peak position
South Korea (Garon International Chart)	168
US Adult R&B Airplay (Billboard)	27
US R&B/Hip Hop Songs	111

== Release history ==
Region	Date	Format	Label
United States	September 18, 2012	Digital download	Epic Records, Syco Music
