= Jangan Kau Bohong =

Single by Fatin Shidqia featuring New Kingz

from the album For You
- Released: February 19, 2014
- Recorded: 2013
- Genre: Pop
- Length: 4:01
- Label: Sony Music
- Songwriters: Charite Viken, Kei Lim, Alexander Austheim, Andrew Jackson, Mats Tideman
- Producers: Alexander "Rykkinnfella" Austheim, Kei Lim

Fatin Shidqia singles chronology
"Cahaya Di Langit Itu" (2013)	"Jangan Kau Bohong" (2014)	"Kaulah Kamuku" (2014)

New Kingz singles chronology
"Jangan Kau Bohong" (2013)

Music video
- "Jangan Kau Bohong" on YouTube

"Jangan Kau Bohong" is a song performed by singer Fatin Shidqia featuring New Kingz. It is her third single and featured on her debut album titled For You was released on 19 February 2014.

== Music videos ==
The lyric video was released on February 7, 2014 on SMEI's YouTube account channel

== Track listing ==
Digital download

1. Jangan Kau Bohong (feat. New Kingz) - 4:01

== Charts ==
=== Weekly charts ===
Chart (2014)	Peak position
Ria FM Chart	1
