= Away (Fatin Shidqia song) =

Single by Fatin Shidqia

from the album Dreams (Original Motion Picture Soundtrack)
- Released: September 16, 2015
- Recorded: 2015
- Genre: Pop
- Length: 3:12
- Label: Sony Music Indonesia
- Songwriters: Ylva Dimberg, Erik Lidbom, Iggy Strange Dahl

Fatin Shidqia singles chronology
"Semua Tentangmu" (2014)	"Away" (2015)	"Percaya" (2016)

Music video
- "Fatin - Away (Official Music Video)" on YouTube

"Away" is a song performed by singer Fatin Shidqia. It is her first single and featured on her second album which would be released in 2016. This song is her first English-language song and used for Soundtrack her debut film title Dreams. In this song, Fatin says the word "Away" 81 times which is noticeable.

== Music videos ==
The lyric video was released on September 17, 2015, on FatinVevo YouTube account channel The music video was released on October 8, 2015, on FatinVevo YouTube account channel.

== Live performances ==
The track was performed live for the first time on 16 September 2015 at Dahsyat on RCTI. On 28 April 2016, Fatin was performed this song in acoustic version at SCTV Music Awards 2016. Fatin also sing this song on her off air performances.

== Track listing ==
Digital download

1. Away (English Version) - 3:11
2. Away (Indonesian Version) - 3:11

== Awards and nominations ==
Year	Type	Award	Result
2016	SCTV Music Awards	Most Famous Music Video	Nominated
