= For You (Fatin Shidqia album) =

Studio album by Fatin Shidqia
- Released: November 11, 2013
- Recorded: 2013
- Genre: Pop
- Length: 45:01
- Label: Sony Music Entertainment
- Producer: Gustav Efraimsson; Hayden Bell

Fatin Shidqia chronology
| For You (2013) | 12 Lagu Islami Terbaik - Fatin & Friends (2014) |

Singles from For You
- 1. "Aku Memilih Setia" Released: May 17, 2013; 2. "Dia Dia Dia" Released: November 7, 2013; 3. "Cahaya Di Langit Itu" Released: November 22, 2013; 4. "Jangan Kau Bohong" Released: February 19, 2014; 5. "Kaulah Kamuku" Released: May 19, 2014; 6. "Semua Tentangmu" Released: September 10, 2014

For You is the debut studio album by Indonesian singer Fatin Shidqia, who won the first season of X Factor Indonesia. It was officially released on November 11, 2013 by Sony Music Entertainment. The album was produced by Swedish producers Gustav Efraimsson and Hayden Bell. The album debuted at number one on the iTunes Indonesia album charts.

The singles released from the album met considerable success. "Aku Memilih Setia" became the singer's first number-one single, "Dia Dia Dia" peaked at number sixteen on the iTunes Indonesia music charts, and "Cahaya Di Langit Itu" became the original soundtrack for the 2013 movie 99 Cahaya di Langit Eropa. The CD version of the album was only available for purchase through Indonesian KFC stores.

== Track listing ==
| No. | Title | Writer(s) | Producer(s) | Length |
|---|---|---|---|---|
| 1. | "Aku Memilih Setia" | M. Fredy Harahap | M. Fredy Harahap | 4:37 |
| 2. | "Dalam Lukaku Masih Setia" | Sarah Lundback | Hayden Bell | 4:13 |
| 3. | "Jangan Kau Bohong" (featuring New Kingz) | Charite Viken, Kei Lim, Alexander Austheim, Andrew Jackson, Mats Tideman | Alexander "Rykkinnfella" Austheim, Kei Lim | 4:01 |
| 4. | "Saat Ku Gelap Ku Remang" | Gustav Efraimsson | Gustav Efraimsson | 3:29 |
| 5. | "Dia Dia Dia" | M. Fredy Harahap | M. Fredy Harahap | 4:26 |
| 6. | "Kaulah Kamuku" (featuring The Overtunes) | Cecep Nooris | | 3:38 |
| 7. | "Hold Me" | Erik Lewander | Hayden Bell | 3:20 |
| 8. | "Goodbye" | Mathias Salomon | Hayden Bell | 3:47 |
| 9. | "Semua Tentangmu" | Olof Lindskog | Hayden Bell | 3:12 |
| 10. | "Mengenangmu Mengingatmu" | Grace Sewell | Hayden Bell | 2:49 |
| 11. | "Sadar Dibatas Sabar" | Martin Mulholland, Michelle Leonard, Kristina Kovac, Erlend Elvesveen | Martin Mulholland | 2:46 |
| 12. | "Cahaya Di Langit Itu" | Nukke Kusumadewi | | 4:43 |
| Total length: | | | | 45:01 |

== Charts and certifications ==
=== Weekly charts ===
| Chart (2013) | Peak position |
|---|---|
| Indonesia Indonesian Albums Chart | 1 |

=== Certification ===
| Country | Certification |
|---|---|
| Indonesia (ASIRI) | 7× Platinum |

== Awards ==
| Year | Awards | Label | Category | Result |
|---|---|---|---|---|
| 2014 | Anugerah Musik Indonesia | Sony Music Entertainment Indonesia | Best Pop Album | Won |
| 2014 | Anugerah Musik Indonesia | Sony Music Entertainment Indonesia | Best Album | Won |
| 2014 | Anugerah Musik Indonesia | Sony Music Entertainment Indonesia | Best Recording Producer/Music Director | Won |

== Release history ==
| Country | Date | Format | Label |
|---|---|---|---|
| Indonesia | November 11, 2013 | CD, digital audio music, digital download | Sony Music Entertainment |
| Malaysia | November 11, 2013 | CD, digital audio music, digital download | Sony Music Entertainment |
| Singapore | November 11, 2013 | CD, digital audio music, digital download | Sony Music Entertainment |
| Brunei | November 11, 2013 | CD, digital audio music, digital download | Sony Music Entertainment |
