= CJR (band) =

Indonesian boy band

TBA
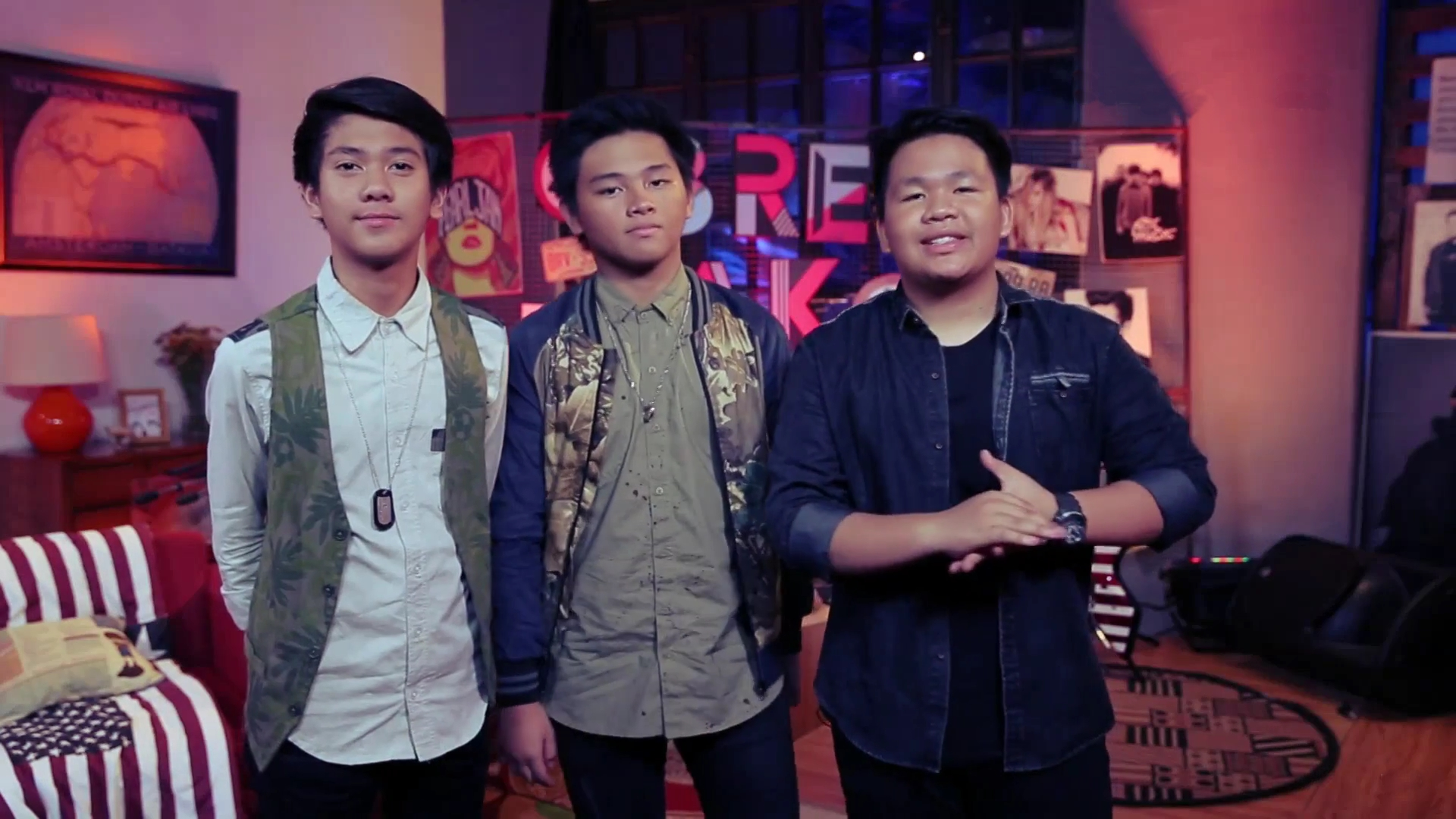
- TBA in 2015 when it was named CJR (from left to right: Iqbaal, Aldy, and Kiki)

Background information
- Origin: Jakarta, Indonesia
- Genres: Dance-pop, Power pop, Teen pop
- Years active: 2011–2014 (Coboy Junior); 2014–2017 (CJR); 2022–present (TBA)
- Labels: Inbek (2011–2017); Seven Music (2011–2017); 1ID Entertainment (2022–2023); Kapital Entertainment (2024—present)
- Members: Teuku Ryzki; Bastian Steel; Aldy Maldini
- Past members: Iqbaal Ramadhan

TBA (an abbreviation of the first names of its three members, namely Teuku Ryzki, Bastian Steel, and Alvaro "Aldy" Maldini), previously named CJR or Coboy Junior, is an Indonesian boyband formed on July 23, 2011, by Patrick Effendy. Previously, this group consisted of 4 people, including Iqbaal Ramadhan. Their fans are known by the nickname Comate (Coboy Junior Mate).

In February 2014, Bastian left Coboy Junior, and the band was renamed CJR, due to Ponco Buwono claiming the contract of the "Coboy" name usage expired. The band disbanded on 2 December 2017, and reborn on 5 September 2022 under the name TBA which is taken from the names of the three returning vocalists, namely Teuku Ryzki Muhammad (Kiki), Bastian Bintang Simbolon (Babas), & Alvaro Maldini Siregar (Aldi).

== History ==
Coboy Junior was established on 23 July 2011, when manager Patrick Effendy called Aldi, Bastian, Iqbaal, and Rizky together for private auditions. The boys had previously performed together in Laskar Pelangi: The Musical and the film Lima Elang; they had also all performed well in singing competitions. Effendy, meanwhile, had previously established a group of child singers which performed under the name Superkids. The band emerged during a period in which new bands of young singers (both boys and girls) were becoming increasingly common; other groups established around this time include Lollipop, Superseven and Swittin. Coboy Junior's initial target audience was preteens, aged 10 to 13. However, Effendy changed their focus, aiming at a wider audience – including adults. The band, aside from their vocals, emphasises costumes and choreography.

Their songs often deal with themes of love. The band is sometimes criticised by adults for this, as the adults feel that they are too young to understand or sing about romantic love. In response, Rizky says that it is normal for 12- to 13-year-old boys to like girls, and that there is no issue so long as the band does not go too deep into the dynamics of love. Effendy, likewise, says that parents have to realise that preteens are already beginning to have romantic feelings towards one another. He also notes business considerations behind the focus on love: as Indonesian children tend to listen to songs meant for adults, they are more accustomed to lyrics about love and thus more interested.

By January 2013, Coboy Junior's single "Eeaa", about puppy love, had made the band nationally popular. They had released three other singles by that time: "Kamu" ("You"), "Kenapa Mengapa" ("Why oh Why"), and "Terhebat" ("The Best"). Bastian, in an interview, suggested that at least 70 percent of Indonesians had heard of them by this time. The band's management utilised this popularity to gather new chances at promotion. For instance, in January 2013, the band made an appearance in the soap opera Hanya Kamu #2 (Only You #2).

The band was scheduled to begin a national tour, styled the CJR Generation Tour 2013, from April to December 2013. They were to play in 30 Indonesian cities, ranging from Sabang in western Indonesia to Merauke in the east. Owing to the members still studying in regular junior high schools, the band was only allowed to tour on weekends; weekdays were dedicated to schooling, although practice sessions could still be held.

On 5 June 2013, the band released a movie, titled Coboy Junior: The Movie. In two days, the film, directed by Anggy Umbara and costarring Astri Nurdin, Fay Nabila, Abimana Aryasatya, Nirina Zubir, and Dewi Sandra, was seen by over 150,000 people. The film followed the band members as they underwent personal development and attempted to win a mixed singing and dancing competition.

Bastian left Coboy Junior in February 2014. Afterwards, the group was renamed CJR - an abbreviation which was already in popular usage to refer to the band.The band disbanded on 2 December 2017.

== Members ==
Coboy Junior consists of four boys:Alvaro Maldini Siregar (Aldi), Bastian Bintang Simbolon (Bastian), Iqbaal Dhiafakhri Ramadhan (Iqbaal), and Teuku Rizky Muhammad (Rizky), whose ages as of March 2013 were 14, 14, 14 and 16, respectively. The band is managed by Patrick Effendy. Bastian left the group in February 2014.

Othersname	Birthname	Place	Birthdate	Position	Others
Aldi	Alvaro Maldini Siregar	Jakarta	14 April 2000	Youngest member, vocalist, dancer	cast Musikal Laskar Pelangi, big 42 Idola Cilik Musim Ketiga, Coboy Junior The Movie, Comic 8
Bastian	Bastian Bintang Sembolon	Bandung, Jawa Barat	21 September 1999	Main vocalist, dancer, visual	cast Musikal Laskar Pelangi, 5 Elang, Jakarta Hati: Hadiah, Coboy Junior The Movie, Comic 8.
Kiki	Teuku Ryzki Muhammad	Jakarta	4 January 1998	Leader, main vocalist, dancer	1 winner AFI Junior 2008, cast Musikal Laskar Pelangi, 5 Elang, 1st-place winner Asia Choir Games category Youth Jazz, 1st-place winner singing competition solo Purwacaraka, Jakarta Hati: Hadiah, Coboy Junior The Movie, Comic 8.

== Single ==
- Kamu (2011)
- Eeaaa (2012)
- Kenapa Mengapa (2012)
- Terhebat (2012)
- Jendral Kancil (2012)
- Terus Berlari (2013)
- Tetap Percaya (2013)
- Ngaca Dulu Deh (2013)
- Pelangi dan Mimpi (2013)
- Life is Bubble Gum (2014)
- Juara Dunia (2014)
- Lebih Baik (2015)
- Happy to Me Be (2015)
- Cuma Kamu (2015)
- Tertipu Baikmu (2015)
- Lagi Lagi Lagi (2015)
- Arti Kata ft. Project Pop (2015)
- Tante Linda (2015)
- Pasti Bisa (2015)
- Cantikgenic (2015)
- Teman Saja (2015)
- Damai (2015)
- #eeeaa ft. Endank Soekamti & Yacko (2015)
- Romansa Muda (2021)
- "U-Uh..." (2023)

== Discography ==
- CJR (2013)
- Lebih Baik (2015)

== Filmography ==
=== Film ===
- Jendral Kancil (2012)
- Jakarta Hati (2013)
- Petualangan Singa Pemberani 2 (2013)
- Coboy Junior The Movie (2013)
- Comic 8 (2014)
- CJR The Movie: Lawan Rasa Takutmu (2015)
- Ada Cinta Di SMA (2016)

=== Television ===
1. Coboy Junior: Hanya Kamu (2012)
2. Coboy Junior: Hanya Kamu#eeeaa 2 (2013)
3. Coboy Junior: Disakiti Oleh Babas

== Works cited ==
- "Arti Ketenaran bagi Coboy Junior" [The Meaning of Fame for Coboy Junior]. Tempo (in Indonesian). 20 January 2013. Archived from the original on 25 October 2013.
- "Coboy Junior, Boyband Cilik Rasa Remaja" [Coboy Junior, Young Boyband with Feelings of Youth]. Tempo (in Indonesian). 20 January 2013. Archived from the original on 24 April 2014.
- "Coboy Junior The Movie". filmindonesia.or.id (in Indonesian). Jakarta: Konfiden Foundation. Archived from the original on 5 August 2013.
- "Guess what?: Coboy Junior to hold tour in 30 cities". The Jakarta Post. 19 March 2013. p. 28. Archived from the original on 2 April 2013.
- Hamonangan, Junianto (24 February 2014). "Ditinggal Personel, Coboy Junior Ganti Nama Jadi CJR" [After a Member Leaves, Coboy Junior Changes Its Name to CJR]. Tribun.
- "Kredit Coboy Junior The Movie" [Credits for Coboy Junior The Movie]. filmindonesia.or.id (in Indonesian). Jakarta: Konfiden Foundation. Archived from the original on 15 August 2013.
- Sari, Dianing (19 January 2013). "Asal-usul Coboy Junior" [Origins of Coboy Junior]. Tempo (in Indonesian). Archived from the original on 24 April 2014.
- Sari, Dianing (20 January 2013). "Lirik Cinta Jadi Trik Coboy Junior" [Lyrics of Love Is Coboy Junior's Trick]. Tempo (in Indonesian). Archived from the original on 25 October 2013.
- Sari, Dianing (19 January 2013). "Paceklik Penyanyi Cilik" [Famine of Young Singers]. Tempo (in Indonesian). Archived from the original on 24 April 2014.
- Suhendra, Ichsan (7 June 2013). "Coboy Junior Kejar Satu Juta Penonton" [Coboy Junior Is After One Million Viewers]. Tempo (in Indonesian). Archived from the original on 6 July 2013.
