= Audie =

Audie, Audey, Audy; is a given name and a surname. Notable people with the name include:

== Given named ==
- Audie Bock (born 1946), American film scholar and politician who served in the California State Assembly from 1999 to 2000
- Audie Cole (born 1989), American National Football League player
- Audie Cornish (born 1979), American journalist
- Audie Desbrow (born 1957), American musician and drummer for Great White
- Adrienne Audie England (born 1967), American actress and professional photographer
- Audy Item, stage name of Indonesian singer Paula Allodya Item (born 1983)
- Audie Murphy (1925–1971), American soldier in World War II, recipient of the Medal of Honor, and movie star
- Audie Norris (born 1960), American retired National Basketball Association player
- Audie Pitre (1970–1997), American bass guitarist
- Audey Prowell, victim of the 1922 lynching in Kirvin, Texas, USA

== Surnamed ==
- Jean-Pierre Audy (born 1952), French politician
- Julien Audy (born 1984), French rugby union player

== See also ==
- Audiy, Russian given name
