= Anugerah Musik Indonesia =

Annual music award

- Anugerah Musik Indonesia logo
- Awarded for: Outstanding achievement in the Indonesian music industry
- Sponsored by: Sharp (2000–2003); Samsung (2004)
- Country: Indonesia
- Presented by: Anugerah Musik Indonesia's board of directors
- First award: 1997
- Website: ami-awards.com

Television/radio coverage
- Network: Indosiar (1997–1999); RCTI (2000–2022); SCTV (2003); TPI (2006); Global TV (2006); TVRI (2006); Indonesiana TV (2023); Moji (2024)

The Anugerah Musik Indonesia (lit. 'Indonesian Music Awards'), also known as AMI or colloquially AMI Awards, is an annual Indonesian music award ceremony to recognize outstanding achievements in improving the quality and quantity of artists in the mainly Indonesian-language music industry. It has been compared to the American Grammy Awards and British Brit Awards. It provides recognition of the music industry similar to other entertainment ceremonies, such as the Indonesian Television Awards, Festival Film Indonesia, or the Indonesian Movie Actors Awards.

== History ==
The awards were formalized as the Indonesian Music Awards in 1997 as a joint project between ASIRI (Recording Industry Association of Indonesia), PAPPRI (Singers, Songwriters, and Music Record Producers Association of Indonesia), and KCI (Copyright Office of Indonesia).

== Organization ==
Each of the three founding organizations originally contributed one board member, under the direction of Indonesian country singer Tantowi Yahya. Under this board was another, less powerful board. Afterward, further divisions were added based on specialization, including Marketing, Communication, and Membership. In 2016, Indonesian jazz musician Dwiki Dharmawan replaced Yahya as chairman.

== Award categories ==
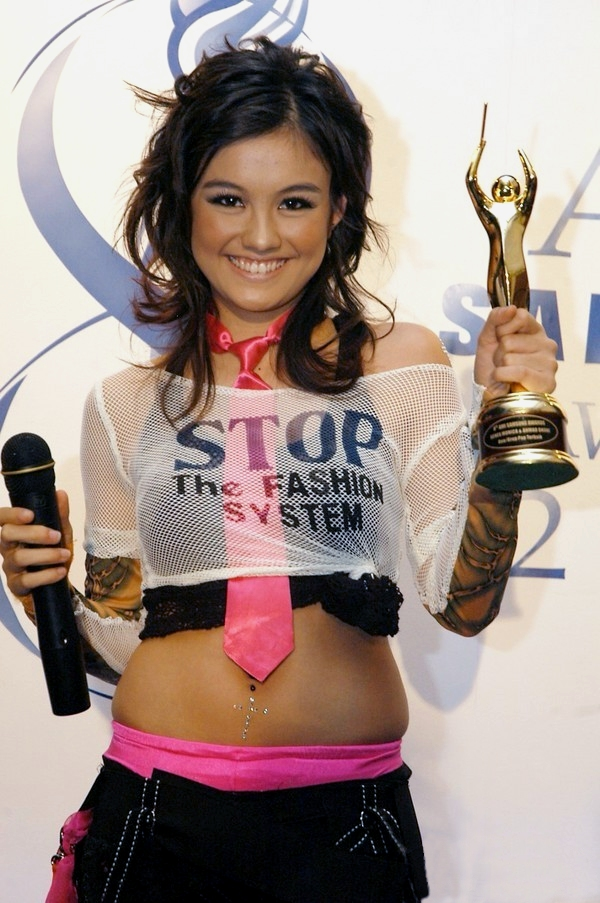
Agnez Mo at the 2004 AMI Awards

The Anugerah Musik Indonesia awards are issued in several categories, each of which isolates a specific contribution to music. Anugerah Musik Indonesia (AMI) categories have been added and removed over time. The 2010 awards had 35 categories, while the 2011 awards had 46. As of 2026, the awards included 67 categories.

The general awards include several awards not restricted by musical genre:

- "Best of the Best Newcomer" is awarded to a promising breakthrough performer.
- "Best of the Best Album" is awarded to the performer and the production team of a full album.
- "Best of the Best Production Work" is awarded to the writer(s)/composer(s) of a song and also the performer.

Other awards are given to performances and productions in different musical genres, as well as for other contributions such as artwork. The Anugerah Musik Indonesia also presents special awards given for longer-lasting contributions to the Indonesian music industry, such as the AMI Legend Award and Lifetime Achievement Award (which is not presented every year).

=== List of categories ===
As of 2026

General

- Best Album
- Best Production Work
- Best Newcomer

Pop

- Best Pop Female Solo Artist
- Best Pop Male Solo Artist
- Best Pop Duo/Group
- Best Pop Songwriting
- Best Pop Production
- Best Pop Album

Rock

- Best Rock Solo/Group/Collaboration Artist
- Best Rock Album

Jazz

- Best Jazz Artist
- Best Alternative Jazz Artist
- Best Jazz/Alternative Jazz Album

Soul/R&B

- Best Soul/R&B Solo Artist
- Best Soul/R&B Duo/Group/Collaboration
- Best Alternative Soul/R&B Solo Artist
- Best Alternative Soul/R&B Duo/Group/Collaboration

Dangdut

- Best Dangdut Male Solo Artist
- Best Dangdut Female Solo Artist
- Best Alternative Dangdut Solo Artist
- Best Dangdut Duo/Group/Collaboration
- Best Electronic Dangdut Solo/Group/Collaboration
- Best Dangdut Songwriting
- Best Dangdut Production

Children's music

- Best Children's Music Solo Artist
- Best Children's Music Duo/Group/Collaboration
- Best Children's Music Songwriting
- Best Children's Music Production

Alternative

- Best Alternative Solo Artist
- Best Alternative Duo/Group/Collaboration
- Best Alternative Album

Keroncong

- Best Keroncong/Stambul/Langgam/Asli Artist
- Best Keroncong/Stambul/Langgam/Extra/Alternative Artist

Dance

- Best Dance Solo/Group/Collaboration Artist

Electronic

- Best Electronic Solo/Group/Collaboration Artist

Metal

- Best Metal Solo/Group/Collaboration Artist
- Best Metal Album

Rap/Hip Hop

- Best Rap/Hip Hop Solo Artist
- Best Rap/Hip Hop Duo/Group/Collaboration
- Best Rap/Hip Hop Album

Koplo

- Best Koplo Solo/Group/Collaboration Artist

Orchestra

- Best Orchestra Works

Music for Visual Media

- Best Film Score Album

Music for Theatre and Musical Film

- Best Song for Musical Theatre/Film

Production work

- Best Progressive Production Work
- Best Reggae/Ska/Rocksteady Production Work
- Best Collaborative Production Work
- Best Original Soundtrack Production Work
- Best Vocal Group Production Work
- Best Regional Language Song Production Work
- Best Instrumental Production Work
- Best World Music Production Work
- Best Rearrangement Production Work
- Best Blues Production Work
- Best Folk/Country/Ballad Production Work
- Best Islamic Music Production Work
- Best Christian Music Production Work
- Best Hipdut Production Work
- Best Ethnic Music Production Work
- Best Eastern Party Production Work

Technical

- Best Recording Producer
- Best Album Graphic Design
- Best Vocal Production Team
- Best Music Video
- Best Vocal Arrangement Work

== List of ceremonies ==
- 1st Annual Anugerah Musik Indonesia
- 2nd Annual Anugerah Musik Indonesia
- 3rd Annual Anugerah Musik Indonesia
- 4th Annual Anugerah Musik Indonesia
- 5th Annual Anugerah Musik Indonesia
- 6th Annual Anugerah Musik Indonesia
- 7th Annual Anugerah Musik Indonesia
- 8th Annual Anugerah Musik Indonesia
- 9th Annual Anugerah Musik Indonesia
- 10th Annual Anugerah Musik Indonesia
- 11th Annual Anugerah Musik Indonesia
- 12th Annual Anugerah Musik Indonesia
- 13th Annual Anugerah Musik Indonesia
- 14th Annual Anugerah Musik Indonesia
- 15th Annual Anugerah Musik Indonesia
- 16th Annual Anugerah Musik Indonesia
- 17th Annual Anugerah Musik Indonesia
- 18th Annual Anugerah Musik Indonesia
- 19th Annual Anugerah Musik Indonesia
- 20th Annual Anugerah Musik Indonesia
- 21st Annual Anugerah Musik Indonesia
- 22nd Annual Anugerah Musik Indonesia
- 23rd Annual Anugerah Musik Indonesia
- 24th Annual Anugerah Musik Indonesia
- 25th Annual Anugerah Musik Indonesia
- 26th Annual Anugerah Musik Indonesia
- 27th Annual Anugerah Musik Indonesia

== Reception ==
The Beat describes the AMIs as "The Grammys a la Indonesia".

== See also ==
- Music of Indonesia
