= X Factor Indonesia season 2 =

X Factor Indonesia
- Season 2
- Hosted by: Robby Purba
- Judges: Ahmad Dhani; Rossa; Afgan; Bebi Romeo; Ayu Ting Ting (Live Shows 9)
- Winners: Jebe & Petty
- Winning mentor: Rossa
- Runner-up: Clarisa Dewi

Release
- Original network: RCTI
- Original release: April 3 – September 11, 2015

Season chronology
- ← Previous; Season 1 Next → Season 3

X Factor Indonesia is an Indonesian television music competition to find new singing talent; the winner of which receives a 1 billion rupiahs recording contract with Sony Music Indonesia. The second season aired on 3 April 2015 and is produced by RCTI in-house production and Fremantle Media Indonesia led by Fabian Dharmawan, RCTI's head of production, together with FM's SVP content and production, Glenn Sims. Robby Purba resumes his role as the host of the show alongside returning judges Ahmad Dhani, Rossa, and Bebi Romeo, while Anggun is replaced by Afgan due to her new commitment as a judge for Asia's Got Talent.

The competition was won by Jebe & Petty and Rossa emerged as the winning mentor for the second time.

== Judges and hosts ==
Robby Purba was the first cast member confirmed to return for the second season in July 2014 during an interview with media. In January 2015, Anggun tweeted that she would leave X Factor Indonesia for an international project which was later revealed to be a judging role for Asia's Got Talent. Her replacement was later confirmed to be young pop star Afgan after RCTI released a series of promos featuring the judges for the second season, which include the remaining judges from the first season Ahmad Dhani, Rossa, and Bebi Romeo, on the late of March 2015.

== Selection process ==
Cities where the auditions were held.

=== Auditions ===
The producers' auditions began on January 14–15, 2015 at the Airlangga University in Surabaya, East Java. More producers' auditions were held on January 17–18 at the State University of Medan in Medan, North Sumatra, January 24–25 at the Jogja Expo Center in Yogyakarta, Special Region of Yogyakarta, February 3–4 at the Sasana Budaya Ganesha in Bandung, West Java and concluded on February 10–12 at the Balai Samudera in Jakarta, Jakarta Special Capital Region.

Audition city	Open audition date	Open audition venue
Surabaya	14–15 January 2015	Airlangga University
Medan	17–18 January 2015	State University of Medan
Yogyakarta	24–25 January 2015	Jogja Expo Center
Bandung	3–4 February 2015	Sasana Budaya Ganesha
Jakarta	10–12 February 2015	Balai Samudera

The contestants who passed producers' audition were later invited to the last set of auditions in Jakarta. These auditions individually occur simultaneously before both the judges and a live studio audience; and with such audience in attendance able to applaud/cheer approval or disapproval and perhaps influencing the judges. The auditions were broadcast on April 3, 10, 17, and 24 episodes.

=== Bootcamp ===
119 acts reached the bootcamp in Jakarta, which includes three sets of challenge. On day one, each act has to perform an a cappella song for 30-second in front of the judges. Afterwards 43 acts were eliminated and the remaining 76 acts were grouped into pairs that will participate in a sing-off duel on the second day, similar to The Voice's battle round. The number of contestants were further reduced after the judges chose only 12 acts for each category, with the exception of only 7 acts for Groups category, to put through to the final challenge. In addition, the judges also gave a second chance for several contestants who were rejected as soloists to continue the competition as groups and formed 3 new groups (a girl duo, a mix duo, and a 5-piece girl group), thus increasing the number of acts from Groups category into 10. It was also revealed that Dhani would mentor the Overages, Rossa would mentor the Groups, Afgan would mentor the Girls, and Bebi would mentor the Boys. The first two challenges of bootcamp were broadcast on May 1 episode.

The final round of bootcamp follows the new format of six-chair challenge featured on the American and the British version of the show. Judges make decisions on whom to put through to judges' houses straight after each act has performed, with those getting a yes taking a seat in the final six chairs on stage. It is up to the mentor to decide, which act they want to take to judges' houses, but once all six spots are full, if the mentor wants to send another act through to the next stage it means they have to replace one of those who were previously given a yes. After the six-chair challenge, the number of remaining acts were narrowed down to 24. The six-chair challenge were broadcast on May 8 and 15 episodes.

Key:

– Contestant was immediately eliminated after performance without switch
– Contestant was switched out later in the competition and eventually eliminated
– Contestant was not switched out and made the final six of their own category

Contestants performances on the six-chair challenge
Episode	Category (mentor)	Act	Order	Song	Mentor's decision	Switched with
Episode 6 (May 8)	Overages (Ahmad Dhani)	Mita Yusuf	1	"Ain't It Fun"	Put in chair 1	—
Episode 6 (May 8)	Overages (Ahmad Dhani)	Rahmadani Nasution	2	"Simply The Best"	Put in chair 2	—
Episode 6 (May 8)	Overages (Ahmad Dhani)	M. Habib Salim	3	"Englishman in New York"	Put in chair 3	—
Episode 6 (May 8)	Overages (Ahmad Dhani)	Ika Roesmaya	4	"Lips Are Movin"	Eliminated	—
Episode 6 (May 8)	Overages (Ahmad Dhani)	Sulle Wijaya	5	"Are You Gonna Be My Girl"	Put in chair 4	—
Episode 6 (May 8)	Overages (Ahmad Dhani)	Milvarra Pohan	6	"Cukup Siti Nurbaya"	Eliminated	—
Episode 6 (May 8)	Overages (Ahmad Dhani)	Desy Natalia	7	"California King Bed"	Put in chair 5	—
Episode 6 (May 8)	Overages (Ahmad Dhani)	Rani Klees	8	"Like A Stone"	Put in chair 6	—
Episode 6 (May 8)	Overages (Ahmad Dhani)	Angela July	9	"Love of My Life"	Put in chair 1	Mita Yusuf
Episode 6 (May 8)	Overages (Ahmad Dhani)	Rizky Kurniady	10	"Crazy"	Eliminated	—
Episode 6 (May 8)	Overages (Ahmad Dhani)	Yosua Pichaba Sitompul	11	"Jealous Guy"	Eliminated	—
Episode 6 (May 8)	Overages (Ahmad Dhani)	Ditta Kristy	12	"The Edge of Glory"	Put in chair 3	M. Habib Salim
Episode 6 (May 8)	Boys (Bebi Romeo)	Ario Setiawan	1	"Save the Last Dance for Me"	Put in chair 1	—
Episode 6 (May 8)	Boys (Bebi Romeo)	Siera Latupeirissa	2	"Seperti yang Kau Minta"	Put in chair 2	—
Episode 6 (May 8)	Boys (Bebi Romeo)	Daniel Ferro	3	"Now and Forever"	Eliminated	—
Episode 6 (May 8)	Boys (Bebi Romeo)	Yefta Richael	4	"Wish You Were Here"	Put in chair 3	—
Episode 6 (May 8)	Boys (Bebi Romeo)	Muhammad Rajasa	5	"Human"	Eliminated	—
Episode 6 (May 8)	Boys (Bebi Romeo)	Irwan Saputra	6	"The One That Got Away"	Eliminated	—
Episode 6 (May 8)	Boys (Bebi Romeo)	Mikael Ronodipuro	7	"I'll Be"	Put in chair 4	—
Episode 6 (May 8)	Boys (Bebi Romeo)	Aditya Wijaya	8	"Moon Blue"	Put in chair 5	—
Episode 6 (May 8)	Boys (Bebi Romeo)	Ramli Nurhappi	9	"U Got It Bad"	Put in chair 6	—
Episode 6 (May 8)	Boys (Bebi Romeo)	I Gusti Bagus Ananta	10	"Talking to the Moon"	Put in chair 4	Mikael Ronodipuro
Episode 6 (May 8)	Boys (Bebi Romeo)	Reymond Dominggus	11	"Locked Out of Heaven"	Eliminated	—
Episode 6 (May 8)	Boys (Bebi Romeo)	Aldy Saputra	12	"Let It Go"	Put in chair 4	I Gusti Bagus Ananta
Episode 7 (May 15)	Girls (Afgan)	Anugrah Kusuma	1	"Rather Be"	Eliminated	—
Episode 7 (May 15)	Girls (Afgan)	Lili Aulya Rizki	2	"Not Like the Movies"	Put in chair 1	—
Episode 7 (May 15)	Girls (Afgan)	Julia Martinez	3	"Ragga Medley"	Put in chair 2	—
Episode 7 (May 15)	Girls (Afgan)	Riska Wulandari	4	"Casualty of Love"	Put in chair 3	—
Episode 7 (May 15)	Girls (Afgan)	Nadira Arisanty	5	"As Long as You're There"	Put in chair 4	—
Episode 7 (May 15)	Girls (Afgan)	Yesa Asadela	6	"The Phoenix"	Eliminated	—
Episode 7 (May 15)	Girls (Afgan)	Ismi Riza	7	"Melt My Heart to Stone"	Put in chair 5	—
Episode 7 (May 15)	Girls (Afgan)	Janita Pangaribuan	8	"A Year Without Rain"	Put in chair 6	—
Episode 7 (May 15)	Girls (Afgan)	Yani Citra	9	"Sympathy Blues"	Eliminated	—
Episode 7 (May 15)	Girls (Afgan)	Yohana Sarah	10	"Cry"	Put in chair 1	Lili Aulya Rizki
Episode 7 (May 15)	Girls (Afgan)	Clarisa Dewi	11	"I Can't Let Go"	Put in chair 6	Janita Pangaribuan
Episode 7 (May 15)	Girls (Afgan)	Ajeng Astiani	12	"It's All Coming Back to Me Now"	Put in chair 4	Nadira Arisanty
Episode 7 (May 15)	Groups (Rossa)	Pimp	1	"Nurlela"	Put in chair 1	—
Episode 7 (May 15)	Groups (Rossa)	Mini Me	2	"Hollaback Girl"	Put in chair 2	—
Episode 7 (May 15)	Groups (Rossa)	Vice Versa	3	"Take Me Home"	Put in chair 3	—
Episode 7 (May 15)	Groups (Rossa)	Xpecta	4	"That Should Be Me"	Eliminated	—
Episode 7 (May 15)	Groups (Rossa)	Chiara Duo	5	"Radioactive"	Put in chair 4	—
Episode 7 (May 15)	Groups (Rossa)	Jebe & Petty	6	"Kanye"	Put in chair 5	—
Episode 7 (May 15)	Groups (Rossa)	VocaGroove	7	"Roman Picisan"	Put in chair 6	—
Episode 7 (May 15)	Groups (Rossa)	Classy	8	"Heart Attack"	Put in chair 1	Pimp
Episode 7 (May 15)	Groups (Rossa)	2RF	9	"Story of My Life"	Eliminated	—
Episode 7 (May 15)	Groups (Rossa)	Jad n Sugy	10	"Try"	Put in chair 3	Vice Versa

The 24 successful acts were:

- Boys: Ario Setiawan, Siera Latupeirissa, Yefta Richael, Aditya Wijaya, Ramli Nurhappi, Aldy Saputra
- Girls: Julia Martinez, Riska Wulandari, Ismi Riza, Yohana Sarah, Clarisa Dewi, Ajeng Astiani
- Overages: Rahmadani Nasution, Sulle Wijaya, Desy Natalia, Rani Klees, Angela July, Ditta Kristy
- Groups: Mini Me, Chiara Duo, Jebe & Petty, VocaGroove, Classy, Jad n Sugy

=== Judges' home visits ===
The judges' home visit was the last stage of the selection process. The final selection process was aided by an assistant per category. Vina Panduwinata joined Dhani at his private villa in Puncak, Judika joined Rossa at her private house in Jakarta, Maia Estianty joined Bebi at Sheraton Hotel in Tangerang, and Cakra Khan joined Afgan at Kemang in Jakarta. At judges' home visit each act performed a song they personally picked and performed it in front of their mentor and his/her assistant. The judges' home visits were broadcast on May 22 and 29 episodes.

Key

– Wildcard winner

Summary of judges' home visits
Judge	Category	Location	Assistant(s)	Contestants eliminated	Wildcards
Afgan	Girls	Kemang, Jakarta	Cakra Khan	Julia Martinez, Yohana Sarah	Ajeng Astiani
Dhani	Overages	Puncak, Bogor	Vina Panduwinata	Rani Klees, Ditta Kristy	Rahmadani Nasution
Rossa	Groups	Rossa's House	Judika	Mini Me, VocaGroove	Chiara Duo
Bebi	Boys	Tangerang	Maia Estianty	Yefta Richael, Aditya Wijaya	Ario Setiawan

Key:

– Contestant was eliminated
– Contestant was made the final three of their own category and advanced to the gala live shows

Contestants performances on the judges' home visits
Episode	Category (mentor)	Act	Order	Song	Mentor's decision	Calling
Episode 8 (May 22)	Boys (Bebi Romeo)	Ario Setiawan	1	"Wake Me Up"	Eliminated	7
Episode 8 (May 22)	Boys (Bebi Romeo)	Aditya Wijaya	5	"Sudah"	Eliminated	2
Episode 8 (May 22)	Boys (Bebi Romeo)	Ramli Nurhappi	6	"Night Changes"	Advanced	3
Episode 8 (May 22)	Boys (Bebi Romeo)	Siera Latupeirissa	7	"How Can You Mend a Broken Heart"	Advanced	12
Episode 8 (May 22)	Boys (Bebi Romeo)	Yefta Richael	8	"Sorry Seems to Be the Hardest Word"	Eliminated	11
Episode 8 (May 22)	Boys (Bebi Romeo)	Aldy Saputra	11	"Uptown Funk"	Advanced	8
Episode 8 (May 22)	Overages (Ahmad Dhani)	Ditta Kristy	2	"Heart-Shaped Box"	Eliminated	6
Episode 8 (May 22)	Overages (Ahmad Dhani)	Rani Klees	3	"Don't Stop Me Now"	Eliminated	10
Episode 8 (May 22)	Overages (Ahmad Dhani)	Rahmadani Nasution	4	"Save Me"	Eliminated	5
Episode 8 (May 22)	Overages (Ahmad Dhani)	Desy Natalia	9	"The Man Who Sold the World"	Advanced	9
Episode 8 (May 22)	Overages (Ahmad Dhani)	Sulle Wijaya	10	"Tie Your Mother Down"	Advanced	4
Episode 8 (May 22)	Overages (Ahmad Dhani)	Angela July	12	"You Take My Breath Away	Advanced	1
Episode 9 (May 29)	Girls (Afgan)	Riska Wulandari	1	"Love"	Advanced	12
Episode 9 (May 29)	Girls (Afgan)	Ajeng Astiani	3	"Honesty"	Eliminated	11
Episode 9 (May 29)	Girls (Afgan)	Julia Martinez	4	"(When You Gonna) Give It Up to Me"	Eliminated	10
Episode 9 (May 29)	Girls (Afgan)	Yohana Sarah	9	"Pyramid"	Eliminated	5
Episode 9 (May 29)	Girls (Afgan)	Ismi Riza	10	"Turn Your Lights Down Low"	Advanced	6
Episode 9 (May 29)	Girls (Afgan)	Clarisa Dewi	12	"The Trouble with Love Is"	Advanced	4
Episode 9 (May 29)	Groups (Rossa)	Chiara Duo	2	"Officially Missing You"	Eliminated	3
Episode 9 (May 29)	Groups (Rossa)	Mini Me	5	"Blank Space"	Eliminated	2
Episode 9 (May 29)	Groups (Rossa)	Jebe & Petty	6	"Gladiator"	Advanced	9
Episode 9 (May 29)	Groups (Rossa)	VocaGroove	7	"Animals"	Eliminated	8
Episode 9 (May 29)	Groups (Rossa)	Classy	8	"Little Me"	Advanced	7
Episode 9 (May 29)	Groups (Rossa)	Jad n Sugy	11	"Heartbeat Song"	Advanced	1

=== Showcase and wildcard ===
Showcase is the first live performance for the 12 acts who made it through to the Gala live show. Each mentor will introduce the acts who best they have to the public. Each act will perform one at a time to show their skills. At the beginning of showcase, it was announced that each judge could bring back one further act back as a wildcard. The public then voted for which of the four wildcards would become the thirteenth finalist. This left one judge with an extra act. Bebi chose Ario Setiawan, Afgan chose Ajeng Astiani, Rossa chose Chiara Duo and Dhani chose Rahmadani Nasution. Ajeng was revealed as the thirteenth act in the end of show.

Contestants' performances on the showcase
Act	Order	Song
Aldy Saputra	1	"Don't"
Riska Wulandari	2	"Who You Are"
Jad n Sugy	3	"Unconditionally"
Sulle Wijaya	4	"Why Can't This Be Love"
Ramli Nurhappi	5	"Chains"
Ismi Riza	6	"Love Me Harder"
Classy	7	"Sing"
Desy Natalia	8	"Any Other Fool"
Siera Latupeirissa	9	"Light My Fire"
Clarisa Dewi	10	"Run"
Jebe & Petty	11	"Fancy"
Angela July	12	"Only Hope"

Key:

– Contestant was eliminated
– Contestant was chosen as the wildcard later by mentor for their own category
– Contestant won the wildcard and eventually advanced to the gala live shows as the 13th finalist

Contestants performances on the wildcard
Category (mentor)	Act	Order	Song	Result
Boys (Bebi Romeo)	Aditya Wijaya	1	"Waiting on the World to Change"	Eliminated
Boys (Bebi Romeo)	Yefta Richael	2	"What Could Have Been Love"	Eliminated
Boys (Bebi Romeo)	Ario Setiawan	3	"You Give Me Something"	Wildcard
Girls (Afgan)	Yohana Sarah	4	"The Voice Within"	Eliminated
Girls (Afgan)	Julia Martinez	5	"Dance with My Father"	Eliminated
Girls (Afgan)	Ajeng Astiani	6	"My All"	Wildcard
Groups (Rossa)	Chiara Duo	7	"Breakeven"	Wildcard
Groups (Rossa)	Mini Me	8	"Bang Bang"	Eliminated
Groups (Rossa)	VocaGroove	9	"Halo"	Eliminated
Overages (Ahmad Dhani)	Rahmadani Nasution	10	"Mamma Knows Best"	Wildcard
Overages (Ahmad Dhani)	Ditta Kristy	11	"Skyscraper"	Eliminated
Overages (Ahmad Dhani)	Rani Klees	12	"Love Hurts"	Eliminated
Wildcard details
Boys (Bebi Romeo)	Ario Setiawan	1	"You Give Me Something"	Eliminated
Girls (Afgan)	Ajeng Astiani	2	"My All"	Advanced
Groups (Rossa)	Chiara Duo	3	"Breakeven"	Eliminated
Overages (Ahmad Dhani)	Rahmadani Nasution	4	"Mamma Knows Best"	Eliminated

== Contestants ==
The top 13 contestants were confirmed as follows;

Key:

– Winner
– Runner-up

Category (mentor)	Acts			
Boys (Bebi)	Aldy Saputra	Ramli Nurhappi	Siera Latupeirissa	
Girls (Afgan)	Ajeng Astiani	Clarisa Dewi	Ismi Riza	Riska Wulandari
Overages (Dhani)	Angela July	Desy Natalia	Sulle Wijaya	
Groups (Rossa)	Classy	Jad n Sugy	Jebe & Petty	

== Gala live shows ==
The Gala live shows began on June 12, 2015. The shows are filmed at the Studio 8 RCTI, Jakarta.

=== Result summary ===
Colour key

–	Contestant was in the bottom two and had to sing again in the final showdown
–	Contestant received the fewest public votes and was immediately eliminated (no final showdown)
–	Contestant saved by the guest judge
–	Contestant received the most public votes

Weekly results per contestant
Contestant	Week 1	Week 2	Week 3	Week 4	Week 5	Week 6	Week 7	Week 8	Week 9	Week 10^{2}	Finals		
Contestant	Week 1	Week 2	Week 3	Week 4	Week 5	Week 6	Week 7	Week 8	Week 9	Week 10^{2}	Round 1	Round 2	Result Show
Jebe & Petty	8th 5.2%	5th 8.2%	3rd 12.6%	1st 13.9%	1st 21.5%	3rd 14.7%	3rd 14.2%	4th 16.5%	2nd 22.4%	1st 22.8%	1st 39.0%	1st 36.7%	Winner; 53.8%
Clarisa Dewi	2nd 11.8%	1st 21.9%	1st 16.4%	4th 11.7%	2nd 14.3%	6th 10.4%	6th 10.9%	1st 19.7%	1st 26.7%	3rd 20.1%	2nd 32.4%	2nd 33.4%	Runner-up; 46.2%
Desy Natalia	5th 10.0%	6th 6.6%	7th 7.1%	5th 10.3%	3rd 11.9%	1st 15.8%	2nd 16.7%	2nd 18.4%	5th 13.9%	2nd 20.6%	3rd 28.6%	3rd 29.9%	Eliminated (Week 12)
Ramli Nurhappi	3rd 11.2%	4th 8.6%	5th 8.4%	3rd 12.8%	7th 8.0%	4th 13.2%	1st 25.7%	3rd 16.9%	4th 16.3%	4th 19.7%	Eliminated (Week 10)		
Aldy Saputra	9th 4.1%	8th 5.3%	8th 7.0%	8th 7.3%	8th 7.2%	5th 11.6%	5th 11.1%	5th 15.3%	3rd 20.7%	5th 16.8%	Eliminated (Week 10)		
Ajeng Astiani	4th 10.1%	2nd 13.4%	6th 7.6%	7th 8.0%	6th 8.1%	8th 9.4%	4th 11.3%	6th 13.2%	Eliminated (Week 8)				
Angela July	7th 9.1%	7th 6.1%	4th 11.4%	6th 8.6%	4th 11.2%	2nd 15.1%	7th 10.1%	Eliminated (Week 7)					
Ismi Riza	1st 15.6%	3rd 12.1%	2nd 15.1%	2nd 13.5%	5th 10.7%	7th 9.8%	Eliminated (Week 6)						
Sulle Wijaya	10th 4.0%	11th 4.2%	9th 6.8%	9th 7.1%	9th 7.1%	Eliminated (Week 5)							
Riska Wulandari	11th 3.6%	10th 4.5%	10th 4.4%	10th 6.8%	Eliminated (Week 4)								
Classy	6th 9.4%	9th 5.1%	11th 3.2%	Eliminated (Week 3)									
Jad n Sugy	13th 2.8%	12th 4.0%	Eliminated (Week 2)										
Siera Latupeirissa	12th 3.1%	Eliminated (Week 1)											
Final showdown	Jad n Sugy, Siera Latupeirissa	Jad n Sugy, Sulle Wijaya	Classy, Riska Wulandari	Sulle Wijaya, Riska Wulandari	Aldy Saputra, Sulle Wijaya	Ajeng Astiani, Ismi Riza	Clarisa Dewi, Angela July	Ajeng Astiani, Aldy Saputra	No final showdown or judges' votes; results were based on public votes alone				
Dhani's vote to eliminate	Siera Latupeirissa	Jad n Sugy	Riska Wulandari	Riska Wulandari	Aldy Saputra	Ismi Riza	Clarisa Dewi	Ajeng Astiani	No final showdown or judges' votes; results were based on public votes alone				
Rossa's vote to eliminate	Siera Latupeirissa	Sulle Wijaya	Riska Wulandari	Riska Wulandari	Aldy Saputra	Ismi Riza	Clarisa Dewi	Aldy Saputra	No final showdown or judges' votes; results were based on public votes alone				
Afgan's vote to eliminate	Siera Latupeirissa	Jad n Sugy	Classy	Sulle Wijaya	Sulle Wijaya	—N/a^{1}	Angela July	Aldy Saputra	No final showdown or judges' votes; results were based on public votes alone				
Bebi's vote to eliminate	Jad n Sugy	Jad n Sugy	Classy	Riska Wulandari	Sulle Wijaya	Ismi Riza	Angela July	Ajeng Astiani	No final showdown or judges' votes; results were based on public votes alone				
Eliminated	Siera Latupeirissa; 3 of 4 votes Majority	Jad n Sugy; 3 of 4 votes Majority	Classy; 2 of 4 votes Deadlock	Riska Wulandari; 3 of 4 votes Majority	Sulle Wijaya; 2 of 4 votes Deadlock	Ismi Riza; 3 of 3 votes Majority	Angela July; 2 of 4 votes Deadlock	Ajeng Astiani; 2 of 4 votes Deadlock	No Elimination	Ramli Nurhappi; Aldy Saputra; Public vote to eliminate	No Elimination	Desy Natalia; Public vote to eliminate	Clarisa Dewi; Runner-up
Eliminated	Siera Latupeirissa; 3 of 4 votes Majority	Jad n Sugy; 3 of 4 votes Majority	Classy; 2 of 4 votes Deadlock	Riska Wulandari; 3 of 4 votes Majority	Sulle Wijaya; 2 of 4 votes Deadlock	Ismi Riza; 3 of 3 votes Majority	Angela July; 2 of 4 votes Deadlock	Ajeng Astiani; 2 of 4 votes Deadlock	No Elimination	Ramli Nurhappi; Aldy Saputra; Public vote to eliminate	No Elimination	Desy Natalia; Public vote to eliminate	Jebe & Petty; Winner

- ^1 Afgan was not required to vote as there was already a majority. However, he stated that he would have voted against Ajeng Astiani.
- ^2 Owing to the privilege of the guest judge's save in the ninth week, two acts were eliminated from the season's semi-final. Aldy Saputra and Ramli Nurhappi received the two fewest public votes and was immediately eliminated.

=== Gala live show details ===
==== Week 1 (June 12) ====
- Theme: Mentor's Favorite

Contestants' performances on the first gala live show
Act	Order	Song	Result
Jebe & Petty	1	"Dear Future Husband"	Safe
Ismi Riza	2	"Warwick Avenue"	Safe
Sulle Wijaya	3	"I Want to Know What Love Is"	Safe
Clarisa Dewi	4	"Gravity"	Safe
Siera Latupeirissa	5	"I Put a Spell on You"	Bottom two
Angela July	6	"Who Wants to Live Forever"	Safe
Classy	7	"Boss"	Safe
Riska Wulandari	8	"FourFiveSeconds"	Safe
Aldy Saputra	9	"You and I"	Safe
Desy Natalia	10	"Lean On"	Safe
Jad n Sugy	11	"Dealova"	Bottom two
Ajeng Astiani	12	"You Don't Know My Name"	Safe
Ramli Nurhappi	13	"See You Again"	Safe
Final showdown details
Siera Latupeirissa	1	"One Last Cry"	Eliminated
Jad n Sugy	2	"Bang Bang"	Safe

Judges' decisions to eliminate

- Bebi: Jad n Sugy – Backed his own act, Siera Latupeirissa
- Rossa: Siera Latupeirissa – Backed her own act, Jad n Sugy
- Dhani: Siera Latupeirissa – Based on the final showdown performances
- Afgan: Siera Latupeirissa – Gave no reason

==== Week 2 (June 19) ====
- Theme: One Decade Hits Song

Contestants' performances on the second gala live show
Act	Order	Song	Result
Jad n Sugy	1	"Heart Attack"	Bottom two
Riska Wulandari	2	"End of Time"	Safe
Ramli Nurhappi	3	"Separuh Aku"	Safe
Clarissa Dewi	4	"Rather Be"	Safe
Ajeng Astiani	5	"Ghost"	Safe
Angela July	6	"Thank You for the Music"	Safe
Sulle Wijaya	7	"Stay the Night"	Bottom two
Classy	8	"Love Never Felt So Good"	Safe
Desy Natalia	9	"I'll Write a Song for You"	Safe
Jebe & Petty	10	"Uptown Funk"	Safe
Aldy Saputra	11	"Mercy"	Safe
Ismi Riza	12	"Spoiled"	Safe
Final showdown details
Jad n Sugy	1	"Don't Stop Me Now"	Eliminated
Sulle Wijaya	2	"Knockin' on Heaven's Door"	Safe

Judges' decisions to eliminate

- Dhani: Jad n Sugy – Backed his own act, Sulle Wijaya
- Rossa: Sulle Wijaya – Backed her own act, Jad n Sugy
- Afgan: Jad n Sugy – Gave no reason
- Bebi: Jad n Sugy – Gave no reason

==== Week 3 (June 26) ====
- Theme: Indonesian Hits

Contestants' performances on the third gala live show
Act	Order	Song	Result
Ajeng Astiani	1	"Cinta dan Benci"	Safe
Ramli Nurhappi	2	"Semua tak Sama"	Safe
Sulle Wijaya	3	"Suit... Suit... He... He... (Gadis Sexy)"	Safe
Clarisa Dewi	4	"Apakah ini Cinta"	Safe
Jebe & Petty	5	"Gajah"	Safe
Riska Wulandari	6	"Mengertilah Kasih"	Bottom two
Desy Natalia	7	"Ingin Bersamamu"	Safe
Aldy Saputra	8	"Firasat"	Safe
Angela July	9	"Tetap Dalam Jiwa"	Safe
Ismi Riza	10	"Pertama"	Safe
Classy	11	"Lumpuhkanlah Ingatanku"	Bottom two
Final showdown details
Classy	1	"Sledgehammmer"	Eliminated
Riska Wulandari	2	"Alasan Terbesar"	Safe

Judges' decisions to eliminate

- Rossa: Riska Wulandari – backed her own act, Classy
- Afgan: Classy – backed his own act, Riska Wulandari
- Dhani: Riska Wulandari – gave no reason
- Bebi: Classy – wanted the result to be decided by the vote of the audience

With the acts in the bottom two receiving two votes each, the result was deadlocked and reverted to the earlier public vote. Classy was eliminated as the act with the fewest public votes.

==== Week 4 (July 3) ====
- Theme: 100 Million Viewers Hits

Contestants' performances on the fourth gala live show
Act	Order	Song	Result
Sulle Wijaya	1	"November Rain"	Bottom two
Riska Wulandari	2	"Firework"	Bottom two
Ismi Riza	3	"Royals"	Safe
Desy Natalia	4	"Break Free"	Safe
Ramli Nurhappi	5	"Love Me like You Do"	Safe
Ajeng Astiani	6	"I'm Not the Only One"	Safe
Aldy Saputra	7	"Let Her Go"	Safe
Angela July	8	"Dark Horse"	Safe
Jebe & Petty	9	"Bad Blood"	Safe
Clarisa Dewi	10	"If I Were a Boy"	Safe
Final showdown details
Riska Wulandari	1	"Jar of Hearts"	Eliminated
Sulle Wijaya	2	"We All Die Young"	Safe

Judges' decisions to eliminate

- Afgan: Sulle Wijaya – backed to his own act, Riska Wulandari
- Dhani: Riska Wulandari – backed to his own act, Sulle Wijaya
- Bebi: Riska Wulandari – based on the final showdown performances
- Rossa: Riska Wulandari – based on the overall progresses

==== Week 5 (July 10) ====
- Theme: Religious Songs
- Musical guest: Raisa – "Jatuh Hati"

Contestants' performances on the fifth gala live show
Act	Order	Song	Result
Ramli Nurhappi	1	"Insha Allah"	Safe
Angela July	2	"Hidup ini Indah"	Safe
Aldy Saputra	3	"Andai Ku Tahu"	Bottom two
Desy Natalia	4	"Jika Cinta Allah"	Safe
Jebe & Petty	5	"Open Your Eyes"	Safe
Clarisa Dewi	6	"Ku Mohon"	Safe
Sulle Wijaya	7	"Satu"	Bottom two
Ajeng Astiani	8	"Doaku Harapanku"	Safe
Ismi Riza	9	"Padamu Ku Bersujud"	Safe
Final showdown details
Sulle Wijaya	1	"D'yer Mak'er"	Eliminated
Aldy Saputra	2	"Dreaming with a Broken Heart"	Safe

Judges' decisions to eliminate

- Dhani: Aldy Saputra, backed to his own act, Sulle Wijaya
- Bebi: Sulle Wijaya, backed to his own act, Aldy Saputra
- Afgan: Sulle Wijaya, gave no reason
- Rossa: Aldy Saputra, wanted the result to be decided by the vote of the audience

With the acts in the bottom two receiving two votes each, the result was deadlocked and reverted to the earlier public vote. Sulle Wijaya was eliminated as the act with the fewest public votes.

==== Week 6 (July 24) ====
- Theme: Love

The sixth Gala Live Show was planned to air on July 17. But, because of public Islamic holiday of Eid al-Fitr which took place on July 18, the sixth week of Gala Live Show was postponed for a week to respect the Muslim viewers of the show which will celebrate it.

Contestants' performances on the sixth gala live show
Act	Order	Song	Result
Angela July	1	"Lay Me Down"	Safe
Clarisa Dewi	2	"Kepastian"	Safe
Jebe & Petty	3	"I Really Like You"	Safe
Aldy Saputra	4	"You Don't Know Me"	Safe
Desy Natalia	5	"Somebody to Love"	Safe
Ajeng Astiani	6	"Andai Aku Bisa"	Bottom two
Ramli Nurhappi	7	"Hard to Say I'm Sorry"	Safe
Ismi Riza	8	"The Last Time"	Bottom two
Final showdown details
Ismi Riza	1	"Don't Know Why"	Eliminated
Ajeng Astiani	2	"Stand Up for Love"	Safe

Judges' decisions to eliminate

- Dhani: Ismi Riza – based on the performance across of this week's shows
- Bebi: Ismi Riza – based on the performances throughout the live shows
- Rossa: Ismi Riza – went with her gut
- Afgan was not required to vote as there was already a majority, but said he would have eliminated Ajeng Astiani.

==== Week 7 (July 31) ====
- Theme: Childhood Songs
- Musical guests: Nate Ruess – "Nothing Without Love" and "Just Give Me a Reason" with Shae

Contestants' performances on the seventh gala live show
Act	Order	Song	Result
Ramli Nurhappi	1	"Nothin' On You"	Safe
Desy Natalia	2	"Soul Brother"	Safe
Clarisa Dewi	3	"Reflection"	Bottom two
Ajeng Astiani	4	"Irreplaceable"	Safe
Aldy Saputra	5	"A Thousand Miles"	Safe
Angela July	6	"If You Leave Me Now"	Bottom two
Jebe & Petty	7	"Telephone"	Safe
Final showdown details
Clarisa Dewi	1	"Because of You"	Safe
Angela July	2	"My Heart Will Go On"	Eliminated

Judges' decisions to eliminate

- Dhani: Clarisa Dewi, backed to his own act, Angela July
- Afgan: Angela July, backed to his own act, Clarisa Dewi
- Bebi: Angela July, because Clarisa was his favourite since audition
- Rossa: Clarisa Dewi, wanted the results to be decided by the vote of audience

With the acts in the bottom two receiving two votes each, the result was deadlocked and reverted to the earlier public vote. Angela July was eliminated as the act with the fewest public votes.

==== Week 8 (August 7) ====
- Theme: Best Selling Records
- Musical guests: Andana Wira – "Rusak Parah" and Boby Berliandika – "Mirasantika"

Contestants' performances on the eighth gala live show
Act	Order	Song	Result
Clarisa Dewi	1	"Forget You"	Safe
Ramli Nurhappi	2	"Steal My Girl"	Safe
Ajeng Astiani	3	"Roar"	Bottom two
Aldy Saputra	4	"Get Lucky"	Bottom two
Jebe & Petty	5	"Tik Tok"	Safe
Desy Natalia	6	"Broken Vow"	Safe
Final showdown details
Aldy Saputra	1	"Half of My Heart"	Safe
Ajeng Astiani	2	"Be the Man"	Eliminated

Judges' decisions to eliminate

- Bebi: Ajeng Astiani, back to his own act, Aldy Saputra
- Afgan: Aldy Saputra, back to his own act, Ajeng Astiani
- Dhani: Ajeng Astiani, gave no reason
- Rossa: Aldy Saputra, gave no reason

With the acts in the bottom two receiving two votes each, the result was deadlocked and reverted to the earlier public vote. Ajeng Astiani was eliminated as the act with the fewest public votes.

==== Week 9 (August 14) ====
- Theme: Dangdut or Indian performances; Best pre-gala live shows performances
- Musical guest: Ayu Ting Ting – "Suara Hati"

Contestants' performances on the ninth gala live show
Act	Order	First song	Order	Second song	Result
Desy Natalia	1	"Jai Ho! (You Are My Destiny)"	6	"I Have Nothing"	Saved
Clarisa Dewi	2	"Goyang Dumang"	8	"Chandelier"	Safe
Jebe & Petty	3	"Kata Pujangga"	7	"Gladiator"	Safe
Ramli Nurhappi	4	"Koi Mil Gaya"	9	"So Sick"	Safe
Aldy Saputra	5	"Ketahuan"/"Toxic	10	"Let It Go"	Safe
No final showdown

This week did not feature a final showdown and instead the act with the fewest public votes, Desy Natalia, was automatically eliminated. However, she was saved by the guest judge, Ayu Ting Ting. There were no eliminations that week all five acts will move on to next week but there will be a double eliminations next week.

==== Week 10: Semi-final (August 21) ====
- Theme: Duets with Mentors; Cross-gender songs by each contestants

For the first time of the show, the semi-final featured five acts. Owing to the privilege of the guest judge's save in the ninth week, two acts were eliminated from the season's semi-final. The two acts with the fewest votes were automatically eliminated.

Contestants' performances on the tenth gala live show
Act	Order	First song	Order	Second song	Result
Jebe & Petty	1	"Hey Ladies" (with Rossa)	6	"Boom Boom Pow"	Safe
Ramli Nurhappi	7	"Cinta Sejati" (with Bebi Romeo)	2	"Stay"	Eliminated
Desy Natalia	3	"Cinta Mati" (with Ahmad Dhani)	8	"Hit Me"	Safe
Clarisa Dewi	9	"Clown" (with Afgan)	4	"Lost Stars"	Safe
Aldy Saputra	5	"Perbedaan" (with Bebi Romeo)	10	"Skinny Love"/"Riptide"/"Ho Hey"	Eliminated
No final showdown

==== Final's Week: Round 1 (August 28) ====
- Theme: Movie Soundtrack; Duets with Seniors from Season 1
- Musical guest: The Overtunes – "Ku Ingin Kau Tahu"

Contestants' performances on the final's week round 1
Act	Order	First song	Movie	Order	Second song
Desy Natalia	1	"Bohemian Rhapsody"	Wayne's World	4	"Moves Like Jagger" (feat. Alex Rudiart)
Jebe & Petty	2	"Flashlight"	Pitch Perfect 2	5	"Sayap Pelindungmu" (feat. The Overtunes)
Clarisa Dewi	3	"Run to You"	The Bodyguard	6	"Domino" (feat. Novita Dewi)

Due to the grand final being in two parts, the public votes will be accumulated with the second finale week's votes and the grand total votes at the end of the final will decide which of the contenders will win. The fewest public votes on the middle of second finale week's performances will eliminate its contender immediately.

==== Final's Week: Round 2 (September 4) ====
- Theme: Divas; Duets with Indonesian Superstar; and Winning singles (billed as "Grand Final")

Contestants' performances on the final's week round 2
Act	Order	First song	Diva(s)	Order	Second song (duets)	Order	Winning song	Result
Jebe & Petty	1	"Paparazzi" / "Poker Face"	Lady Gaga	4	"Jangan Kau Bohong" (feat. Fatin Shidqia)	8	"Over You"	Safe
Desy Natalia	2	"Single Ladies (Put a Ring on It)"	Beyoncé	6	"Karena Aku Pacarmu" (feat. Mulan Jameela)	N/A	N/A	Eliminated
Clarisa Dewi	3	"Fighter"	Christina Aguilera	5	"Aku Yang Tersakiti" (feat. Judika)	7	"Hilang"	Safe

==== Result Show (September 11) ====
- Theme: Best free songs performances; Duets with former rival mentors
- Group and solo performances: All finalist – "Flashdance (What A Feeling)", Clarisa Dewi and Jebe & Petty – "Can't Hold Us", Fatin Shidqia – "Grenade" / "Aku Memilih Setia" and "Kaulah Kamuku" with The Overtunes, Angela July, Novita Dewi and Desy Natalia – "Problem", Agus Hafiluddin, Nu Dimension, Alex Rudiart and Isa Raja – "Habits (Stay High)", Afgan and Rossa – "Sabar" / "Tegar" / "Kamu Yang Kutunggu".
- Musical guests: Fatin Shidqia, Novita Dewi, Nu Dimension, The Overtunes, Isa Raja, Alex Rudiart, Agus Hafiluddin, Afgan, and Rossa.

The winner announcement was held in Ecovention, Ecopark, North Jakarta.

Contestants' performances on the result show
Act	Order	First song	Order	Second song	Result
Jebe & Petty	1	"Hey Mama"	3	"Scream and Shout" (feat. Ahmad Dhani)	Winner
Clarisa Dewi	2	"All By Myself"	4	"Sadis" (feat. Bebi Romeo)	Runner-up

== Contestants who appeared on other talent shows ==
- Jad n Sugy was a contestant on the first season of X Factor Indonesia where they were eliminated at the Judge Home Visit.
- Yosua Pichaba Sitompul was a contestant on the sixth season of Akademi Fantasi Indosiar where he was eliminated at the Top 4.
- Ajeng Astiani was a contestant on the first season of Mamamia Show where she was eliminated at the Top 4.
- Rizky Inggar was a contestant on the first season of The Voice Indonesia and was on Team Sherina Munaf, where she was eliminated at the Top 16.
- Jessica Bennett of Jebe & Petty was a contestant on the third season of Indonesia Mencari Bakat where she was eliminated at the Top 10.
- Glenovian Armando Marcel of Vice Versa was a contestant on the third season of Indonesian Idol where he was eliminated at the Workshop.
- Riska Wulandari was contestant on the eighth season of Indonesian Idol where she was eliminated at the elimination 1.
- Ismi Riza was a contestant on the first season of Rising Star Indonesia where she was eliminated at the live audition.
- Rani Klees, who was eliminated in the showcase in this season of X Factor Indonesia, would go on as contestant on the second season of The Voice Indonesia, but failed to turn any chairs in the blind auditions.
- Janita Pangaribuan, Jansen Daniel, M. Habib, Julivan and Rizki Jonathan – Andry Fernando (2RF) would go on as contestant on the second season of The Voice Indonesia, but was eliminated in the battle rounds.
- Irwan Saputra, who was eliminated in the bootcamp in this season on X Factor Indonesia, would go on as contestant on the second season of The Voice Indonesia, but was eliminated in the knockouts.
- Danel Ferro and Natasya Misel, who was eliminated in the bootcamp in this season on X Factor Indonesia, would go on as contestant on the second season of The Voice Indonesia, but was eliminated in the Top 24.
- Ario Setiawan, who was eliminated in the showcase in this season on X Factor Indonesia, would go on as contestant on the second season of The Voice Indonesia, but was eliminated in the Semi-final.
