= Breakeven (song) =

2008 single by the Script

Single by the Script

from the album The Script
- B-side: "None the Wiser"
- Released: 24 November 2008
- Recorded: 2008
- Genre: Pop rock
- Length: 4:21
- Label: Sony
- Songwriters: Andrew Frampton; Danny O'Donoghue; Mark Sheehan; Steve Kipner
- Producers: Andrew Frampton; Steve Kipner

The Script singles chronology
"The Man Who Can't Be Moved" (2008)	"Breakeven" (2008)	"Talk You Down" (2009)

Music video
- "Breakeven" on YouTube

Audio sample
- file; help

"Breakeven", also titled "Breakeven (Falling to Pieces)" is a song by the Irish pop rock band the Script. It was released on 24 November 2008 as the third single from their first album, The Script (2008). The song peaked at number 10 in Ireland, number 21 in the United Kingdom, number 12 in the United States Billboard Hot 100 and number 3 in Australia.

== Composition ==
According to Musicnotes, "Breakeven" is in the key of B♭ major with a tempo of 88 beats per minute.

== Lyrics ==
According to co-writer Danny O'Donoghue, the line "What am I supposed to do when the best part of me was always you?", which is in the song's chorus, was inspired by the line "The greatest thing about me was always you" from the 2003 Christmas romantic comedy film Love Actually.

== Music video ==
The music video premiered on BBC Radio 1's website on 29 September 2008. It was recorded at the Great South Wall in Dublin. Before recording began, the Dublin radio station FM104 had a competition for a listener to appear in the music video. The music video shows clips of the band's home city of Dublin, Ireland, and the band performing.

The video almost created minor controversy when Danny O'Donoghue's ex-girlfriend was supposed to be cast as an extra but this was avoided when the producers chose a different girl. The video was number 2 on the 2010 VH1's Top 40 Videos of the Year.

== Live performances ==
- The band performed "Breakeven" on an episode of The Paul O'Grady Show which was shown on 30 October 2008.
- As a support act for U2 on the third concert of their 360° Tour at Croke Park, the band included this song in their set.
- On 14 October 2009, they performed the song on The Ellen DeGeneres Show in the United States.

== Track listing ==
- CD single
1. "Breakeven" - 4:21
2. "None the Wiser" (Guardian Demo)
- German CD single
1. "Breakeven" - 4:21
2. "Lose Yourself" (Radio 1 Live Lounge Session)
- German Maxi single
1. "Breakeven" - 4:21
2. "None the Wiser" (Guardian Demo)
3. "Lose Yourself" (Radio 1 Live Lounge Session)
4. "Breakeven" (Music Video) - 4:15

== Charts ==
=== Weekly charts ===
Chart (2008–2025)	Peak position
Australia (ARIA)	3
Austria (Ö3 Austria Top 40)	75
Canada Hot 100 (Billboard)	20
Canada AC (Billboard)	6
Canada CHR/Top 40 (Billboard)	17
Canada Hot AC (Billboard)	3
Germany (GfK)	71
Ireland (IRMA)	10
Japan Hot 100 (Billboard)	77
Netherlands (Single Top 100)	48
Philippines (Philippines Hot 100)	40
Scottish Singles Sales (Official Charts)	12
Slovakia Airplay (ČNS IFPI)	97
Switzerland (Schweizer Hitparade)	66
UK Singles (Official Charts)	21
US Billboard Hot 100	12
US Adult Alternative Airplay (Billboard)	12
US Adult Contemporary (Billboard)	1
US Adult Pop Airplay (Billboard)	1
US Pop Airplay (Billboard)	6

=== Year-end charts ===
Chart (2008)	Position
UK Singles (OCC)	119

Chart (2009)	Position
Australia (ARIA)	24
UK Singles (OCC)	129

Chart (2010)	Position
Canada (Canadian Hot 100)	62
US Billboard Hot 100	27
US Adult Contemporary (Billboard)	9
US Adult Top 40 (Billboard)	2
US Mainstream Top 40 (Billboard)	21

Chart (2011)	Position
US Adult Contemporary (Billboard)	11

Chart (2025)	Position
Philippines (Philippines Hot 100)	40

== Certifications ==
Region	Certification	Certified units/sales
Australia (ARIA)	5× Platinum	350,000^{‡}
Denmark (IFPI Danmark)	Platinum	90,000^{‡}
Germany (BVMI)	Gold	300,000^{‡}
Italy (FIMI)	Gold	25,000^{‡}
New Zealand (RMNZ)	5× Platinum	150,000^{‡}
United Kingdom (BPI)	3× Platinum	1,800,000^{‡}
United States (RIAA)	2× Platinum	2,709,000
Streaming
Denmark (IFPI Danmark)	Gold	900,000^{†}
^{‡} Sales+streaming figures based on certification alone.^{†} Streaming-only figures based on certification alone.

== Release history ==
Release dates and formats for "Breakeven"
Region	Date	Format	Label(s)	Ref.
United States	29 September 2009	Mainstream airplay	Epic	

== Cover versions ==
On 19 November 2012, Samantha Jade performed "Breakeven" during The X Factor Australia series four grand final performance show. Her performance of the song debuted at number 87 on the Australian ARIA Singles Chart. On 25 August 2013, Jade and The X Factor Indonesia series one runner-up Novita Dewi released a cover version of "Breakeven" on the iTunes Store through Sony Music Australia.

Canadian singer Tate McRae performed a cover of the song during her North American tour in March–April 2022.

On 27 May 2025, Jourdan Blue performed a cover of the song during America's Got Talent season 20, earning a Golden Buzzer from Howie Mandel.

From 25 to 27 October 2026, British boy band DearALICE covered the song as part of their DearALICE Tour 2026 in Manchester, London and Birmingham.

== See also ==
- List of Billboard Adult Contemporary number ones of 2010
