= X Factor Indonesia season 3 =

X Factor Indonesia
- Season 3
- Hosted by: Robby Purba
- Judges: Anang Hermansyah; Ariel "Noah"; Bunga Citra Lestari; Judika; Rossa
- Winner: Alvin Jonathan
- Winning mentor: Bunga Citra Lestari
- Runner-up: 2nd Chance

Release
- Original network: RCTI
- Original release: December 13, 2021 – April 18, 2022

Season chronology
- ← Previous; Season 2

The third season of X Factor Indonesia aired on 13 December 2021 and is produced by RCTI in-house production and Fremantle Indonesia. Robby Purba resumes his role as the host of the show alongside returning judges Rossa, while Afgan, Ahmad Dhani and Bebi Romeo is replaced by Anang Hermansyah, Bunga Citra Lestari, Ariel "Noah", and Judika. The winner of this season received 1 billion rupiahs, an all-new car and motorcycle units, and a recording contract with Hits Records.

The competition was won by 24-year-old Alvin Jonathan, with Bunga Citra Lestari emerging as the winning mentor, ending Rossa's winning streak in the previous two seasons. It's Bunga's first win as a mentor and the first win for a contestant from the 'Boys' category.

== Judges and hosts ==
Robby Purba was the first cast member confirmed to return for the third season in July 2021 based on his Instagram post. Later, it was officially announced in X Factor Indonesia's official social media as same as 35th Robby's birthday date at July 25, 2021.

At October 19, 2021 a spoiler video showed at social media that Rossa return for her third season, with another new judges such as Anang Hermansyah, Ariel "Noah", Bunga Citra Lestari, and Judika. Later, it was officially announced in X Factor Indonesia's official social media at November 5, 2021.

== Selection process ==
=== Auditions ===
The online auditions divided into three phases. First phase began on July 14 – August 15, 2021, second phase began on September 6–19, 2021 and third phase began on October 11–31, 2021 at RCTI+, Facebook, Instagram and Facebook Messenger platform. The online auditions also held at TikTok platform. This season only held online auditions and no held direct auditions in any city because of COVID-19 pandemic.

The contestants who passed online audition were later invited to the last set of auditions in Jakarta. These auditions individually occur simultaneously before the judges; and with no audience in studio to keep COVID-19 safety protocols. The auditions were broadcast on December 13–14 and 20–21 episodes.

=== Bootcamp ===
The 30 successful acts were:

- Boys: Jeremia Frans, Alvin Jonathan, Iyan Joshua, Edo Pratama, Tyok Satrio, Danar Widianto
- Girls: Sonya Bara, Jessica Emmanuella, Nada Fidarensa, Maysha Jhuan, Putu Maydea, Marcella Nursalim
- Males: Abdurrachman, Roby Gultom, Andi Gunawan, Hendra Nurrahman, Daniel Pattinama, Akshin Zaidi
- Females: Intan Ayu, Ruth Nelly, Mary Rumintjap, Elfa Tahmila, Nadhira Ulya, Saly Yuniar
- Groups: 2nd Chance, For-X, GeryGany, The Gon's, Twister, Whiz

=== Judges' home visits ===
Summary of judges' home visits
Judge	Category	Location	Assistant(s)	Contestants eliminated
Anang	Females	Maia Estianty's House	Maia Estianty	Mary Rumintjap, Elfa Tahmila, Saly Yuniar
Ariel Noah	Groups		Ahmad Dhani	For-X, The Gon's, Twister
BCL	Boys	BCL's House	Nino Kayam	Jeremia Frans, Iyan Joshua, Tyok Satrio
Judika	Males	Playfield Kid's Academy	Armand Maulana	Andi Gunawan, Daniel Pattinama, Akshin Zaidi
Rossa	Girls	Rossa's House	Afgan	Sonya Bara, Jessica Emmanuella, Nada Fidarensa

== Contestants ==
The top 15 contestants were confirmed as follows;

Key:

– Winner
– Runner-up

Category (mentor)	Acts		
Boys (BCL)	Alvin Jonathan	Danar Widianto	Edo Pratama
Girls (Rossa)	Maysha Jhuan	Putu Maydea	Marcella Nursalim
Groups (Ariel Noah)	2nd Chance	GeryGany	Whiz
Males (Judika)	Roby Gultom	Hendra Nurrahman	Abdurrachman
Females (Anang)	Ruth Nelly	Nadhira Ulya	Intan Ayu

== Gala live shows ==
The Gala live shows began on January 17, 2022.

=== Result summary ===
Colour key

Act in team BCL

Act in team Ariel

Act in team Anang

Act in team Rossa

Act in team Judika

Contestant was in the bottom two/three and had to sing again in the Save Me Song

Contestant received the fewest public votes but safe from elimination (no Save Me Song)

Contestant received the most public votes

Contestant received the fewest public votes and was immediately eliminated (no Save Me Song)

Contestant came 1st place

Contestant came 2nd place

The most multi 1st place on public vote

Weekly results per contestant
Contestant	Week 1	Week 2	Week 3	Week 4	Week 5	Week 6	Week 7	Week 8	Week 9	Road To Grand Final	Grand Final	Final Countdown & Result Show
Alvin Jonathan	7th 7.2%	3rd 9.2%	2nd 11.2%	4th 10.5%	2nd 14.2%	5th 10.7%	2nd 17.2%	3rd 19.8%	2nd 18.7%	3rd 19.8%	2nd 25.3%	Winner; 33.9%
2nd Chance	5th 7.9%	4th 8.1%	4th 9.6%	5th 10.2%	3rd 11.4%	4th 11.1%	3rd 12.1%	1st 22.9%	3rd 15.4%	2nd 21.5%	3rd 23.5%	Runner-up; 33.3%
Danar Widianto	1st 13.2%	2nd 11.9%	1st 14.3%	1st 15.6%	1st 19.3%	1st 21.6%	1st 23.5%	2nd 20.3%	1st 27.1%	1st 30.1%	1st 31.8%	3rd 32.8%
Maysha Jhuan	6th 7.8%	5th 7.4%	8th 6.9%	6th 8.1%	7th 7.7%	8th 7.2%	4th 11.4%	7th 8.3%	4th 13.9%	4th 15.4%	'4th 19.4%	Eliminated (Week 11)
Roby Gultom	8th 5.7%	6th 7.2%	7th 7.1%	8th 6.8%	6th 7.9%	6th 8.3%	5th 9.6%	4th 10.7%	6th 12.2%	5th 13.2%	Eliminated (Week 10)	
GeryGany	3rd 9.1%	7th 7.1%	5th 8.7%	3rd 11.2%	5th 8.8%	3rd 11.4%	8th 8.6%	5th 9.2%	'5th 12.7%	Eliminated (Week 9)		
Hendra Nurrahman	9th 5.6%	9th 6.2%	6th 7.3%	11th 4.8%	10th 6.7%	7th 7.4%	6th 8.9%	6th 8.8%	Eliminated (Week 8)			
Putu Maydea	2nd 10.2%	1st 13.7%	3rd 10.1%	2nd 11.7%	4th 9.5%	2nd 15.4%	7th 8.7%	Eliminated (Week 7)				
Ruth Nelly	10th 5.2%	8th 7.4%	9th 6.5%	7th 7.3%	8th 7.4%	9th 6.9%	Eliminated (Week 6)					
Nadhira Ulya	13th 3.6%	10th 6.1%	12th 5.8%	9th 6.4%	9th 7.1%	Eliminated (Week 5)						
Abdurrachman	12th 4.1%	13th 4.8%	10th 6.4%	10th 5.3%	Eliminated (Week 4)							
Edo Pratama	4th 9.0%	11th 5.5%	11th 6.1%	Eliminated (Week 3)								
Whiz	11th 4.3%	12th 5.4%	Eliminated (Week 2)									
Intan Ayu	14th 3.9%	Eliminated (Week 1)										
Marcella Nursalim	15th 3.2%	Eliminated (Week 1)										
Save Me Song	Intan Ayu, Marcella Nursalim, Nadhira Ulya	Abdurrachman, Whiz	Edo Pratama, Nadhira Ulya	Abdurrachman, Hendra Nurrahman	Hendra Nurrahman, Nadhira Ulya	Maysha Juan, Ruth Nelly	GeryGany, Putu Maydea	Hendra Nurrahman, Maysha Jhuan	GeryGany, Roby Gultom	There is no reappearance in the Save Me Song round or judges selection. The results are determined only based on public votes.		
Anang's vote to save	Nadhira Ulya^{1}	Abdurrachman^{3}	Nadhira Ulya	Hendra Nurrahman	Nadhira Ulya	Ruth Nelly	—	—	—	There is no reappearance in the Save Me Song round or judges selection. The results are determined only based on public votes.		
BCL's vote to save	Nadhira Ulya	Abdurrachman	Edo Pratama	Abdurrachman	Hendra Nurrahman	Maysha Juan	GeryGany	Maysha Jhuan	Roby Gultom	There is no reappearance in the Save Me Song round or judges selection. The results are determined only based on public votes.		
Ariel Noah's vote to save	—^{2}	Whiz	Nadhira Ulya	Hendra Nurrahman	Nadhira Ulya	Maysha Juan	GeryGany	Maysha Jhuan	GeryGany	There is no reappearance in the Save Me Song round or judges selection. The results are determined only based on public votes.		
Rossa's vote to save	Marcella Nursalim	Whiz	Nadhira Ulya	Hendra Nurrahman	Hendra Nurrahman	Maysha Juan	Putu Maydea	Maysha Jhuan	Roby Gultom	There is no reappearance in the Save Me Song round or judges selection. The results are determined only based on public votes.		
Judika's vote to save	Nadhira Ulya	Abdurrachman	—^{4}	—^{5}	Hendra Nurrahman^{6}	Ruth Nelly	GeryGany	Hendra Nurrahman	Roby Gultom	There is no reappearance in the Save Me Song round or judges selection. The results are determined only based on public votes.		
Eliminated	Intan Ayu; 0 of 4 votes Minority; Marcella Nursalim; 1 of 4 votes Minority	Whiz; 2 of 5 votes Minority	Edo Pratama; 1 of 4 votes Minority	Abdurrachman; 1 of 4 votes Minority	Nadhira Ulya; 2 of 5 votes Minority	Ruth Nelly 2 of 5 votes Minority	Putu Maydea 1 of 5 votes Minority	Hendra Nurrahman 1 of 5 votes Minority	GeryGany 1 of 4 votes Minority	Roby Gultom	Maysha Jhuan	Danar Widianto; 2nd Chance; Runner-up

- ^1 Maia Estianty cast Anang Hermansyah's vote in her absence.
- ^2 Ariel Noah was not required to vote as there was already a majority.
- ^3 Maia Estianty cast Anang Hermansyah's vote in her absence.
- ^4 Judika was not required to vote as there was already a majority.
- ^5 Judika was not required to vote as there was already a majority.
- ^6 Armand Maulana cast Judika's vote in his absence.

=== Gala live show details ===
==== Week 1 (January 17) ====
- Theme: Contestant's Choice

Contestants' performances on the first gala live show
Act	Order	Song	Result
Ruth Nelly	1	"Million Reasons"	Safe
GeryGany	2	"Januari"	Safe
Roby Gultom	3	"Fix You"	Safe
Edo Pratama	4	"Almost Is Never Enough"	Safe
Marcella Nursalim	5	"Un-Break My Heart"	Bottom three
Intan Ayu	6	"Lebih dari Egoku"	Bottom three
Whiz	7	"Dancing Queen"	Safe
Nadhira Ulya	8	"Waiting in Vain"	Bottom three
Maysha Jhuan	9	"Pesan Terakhir"	Safe
Hendra Nurrahman	10	"Move"	Safe
Abdurrachman	11	"Back at One"	Safe
Alvin Jonathan	12	"Pegang Tanganku"	Safe
Putu Maydea	13	"Drivers License"	Safe
Danar Widianto	14	"Yang Terdalam"	Safe
2nd Chance	15	"Earth Song"	Safe
Save Me Song results
Marcella Nursalim	1	"Pergilah Kasih"	Eliminated
Intan Ayu	2	"Overjoyed"	Eliminated
Nadhira Ulya	3	"Yellow"	Safe

Anang Hermansyah was absent for the first gala live show due to being in quarantine. Therefore, Maia Estianty filled in as her replacement.

Judges' decisions to save

- Rossa: Marcella Nursalim – Backed her own act
- Estianty: Nadhira Elya – Backed one of Anang's acts and based it on the Save Me Song performance
- Judika: Nadhira Elya – Gave no reason
- BCL: Nadhira Elya – Gave no reason
- Ariel Noah was not required to vote as there was already a majority.

==== Week 2 (January 24) ====
- Theme: Top Hits songs

Contestants' performances on the second gala live show
Act	Order	Song	Result
GeryGany	1	"Kangen"	Safe
Maysha Jhuan	2	"As the World Caves In"	Safe
Nadhira Ulya	3	"Tak Bisa Hidup Tanpamu"	Safe
Edo Pratama	4	"Berakhir Sama"	Safe
Ruth Nelly	5	"Don't Let Me Down"	Safe
Whiz	6	"Paralyzed"	Bottom two
Hendra Nurrahman	7	"Usaha Jeung Doa" (Original song)	Safe
Abdurrachman	8	"Now I Know"	Bottom two
Alvin Jonathan	9	"To the Bone"	Safe
2nd Chance	10	"Tears"	Safe
Putu Maydea	11	"River"	Safe
Roby Gultom	12	"Always Remember Us This Way"	Safe
Danar Widianto	13	"Mesin Waktu"	Safe
Save Me Song results
Abdurrachman	1	"So Sick"	Safe
Whiz	2	"Separuh Aku"	Eliminated

Anang Hermansyah was absent for the second gala live show due to being in quarantine. Therefore, Maia Estianty filled in as her replacement.

Judges' decisions to save

- Judika: Abdurrachman
- Rossa: Whiz
- Ariel Noah: Whiz
- BCL: Abdurrachman
- Estianty: Abdurrachman

==== Week 3 (January 31) ====
- Theme: Viewers Challenge

Contestants' performances on the third gala live show
Act	Order	Song	Result
Roby Gultom	1	"Believe"	Safe
Maysha Jhuan	2	"Every Summertime"	Safe
Edo Pratama	3	"The Scientist"	Bottom two
Ruth Nelly	4	"Sisa Rasa"	Safe
Abdurrachman	5	"Treat You Better"	Safe
GeryGany	6	"September"	Safe
Hendra Nurrahman	7	"Bintangku"	Safe
Nadhira Ulya	8	"Drag Me Down"	Bottom two
Danar Widianto	9	"Sepatu"	Safe
Putu Maydea	10	"Team"	Safe
2nd Chance	11	"Hard to Say I'm Sorry"	Safe
Alvin Jonathan	12	"Pray for Me"	Safe
Save Me Song results
Edo Pratama	1	"Love You Goodbye"	Eliminated
Nadhira Ulya	2	"Ordinary People"	Safe

Judges' decisions to save

- Anang: Nadhira Ulya
- BCL: Edo Pratama
- Ariel Noah: Nadhira Ulya
- Rossa: Nadhira Ulya
- Judika was not required to vote as there was already a majority.

==== Week 4 (February 7) ====
- Theme: Love songs

Contestants' performances on the fourth gala live show
Act	Order	Song	Result
Putu Maydea	1	"Mimpi"	Safe
GeryGany	2	"Cantik"	Safe
Nadhira Ulya	3	"Risalah Hati"	Safe
Hendra Nurrahman	4	"Memble Tapi Kece"	Bottom two
Danar Widianto	5	"Can't Help Falling in Love"	Safe
Ruth Nelly	6	"What About Us"	Safe
Maysha Jhuan	7	"Cuek"	Safe
Abdurrachman	8	"Have Fun, Go Mad"	Bottom two
Alvin Jonathan	9	"Takkan Berpaling Darimu"	Safe
Roby Gultom	10	"Waktu dan Perhatian"	Safe
2nd Chance	11	"Mirrors"	Safe
Save Me Song results
Abdurrachman	1	"Sedih Tak Berujung"	Eliminated
Hendra Nurrahman	2	"Life of the Party"	Safe

Judges' decisions to save

- Anang: Hendra Nurrahman
- Ariel Noah: Hendra Nurrahman
- BCL: Abdurrachman
- Rossa: Hendra Nurrahman
- Judika was not required to vote as there was already a majority.

==== Week 5 (February 14) ====
- Theme:

Contestants' performances on the fifth gala live show
Act	Order	Song	Result
2nd Chance	1	"Dekat Di Hati"	Safe
Roby Gultom	2	"Halo"	Safe
Putu Maydea	3	"Chandelier"	Safe
Danar Widianto	4	"Monolog"	Safe
Ruth Nelly	5	"Cinta Sejati"	Safe
GeryGany	6	"Watermelon Sugar"	Safe
Maysha Jhuan	7	"Happier"	Safe
Hendra Nurrahman	8	"Cewe Mah Gitu" (Original song)	Bottom two
Nadhira Ulya	9	"Begitu Salah Begitu Benar"	Bottom two
Alvin Jonathan	10	"Falling"	Safe
Duets
Ruth Nelly & Nadhira Ulya	1	"Stand Up for Love"	
Roby Gultom & Hendra Nurrahman	2	"Bang Bang"	
Putu Maydea & Maysha Jhuan	3	"Uptown Funk"/"Lips Are Movin"	
Danar Widianto & Alvin Jonathan	4	"Sahabat Kecil"	
2nd Chance & GeryGany	5	"Rumah Kita"	
Save Me Song results
Nadhira Ulya	1	"Hello"	Eliminated
Hendra Nurrahman	2	"Pulang"	Safe

Judika was absent for the fifth gala live show. Therefore, Armand Maulana filled in as his replacement.

Judges' decisions to save

- Anang: Nadhira Ulya
- Maulana: Hendra Nurrahman
- Ariel Noah: Nadhira Ulya
- BCL: Hendra Nurrahman
- Rossa: Hendra Nurrahman
