= Novita Dewi =

Indonesian singer (born 1978)

- Also known as: Dewi Marpaung, Dewi Marfa
- Born: Novita Dewi Marpaung; 15 November 1978 (age 47); Jakarta, Indonesia
- Genres: Pop, rock, gospel
- Occupation: Singer
- Instrument: Vocals
- Years active: 1996–present
- Labels: Nagaswara

Novita Dewi Marpaung (born 15 November 1978) is an Indonesian singer, who gained wide prominence after being the runner-up of the first season of X Factor Indonesia. She is known for her powerful vocals and skilled singing techniques. Dewi is the daughter of legendary Batak singer Jack Marpaung. She started her music career in the mid-1990s through various singing competitions and festivals. She was the runner-up of Cipta Pesona Bintang, the weekly champion of Asia Bagus, and the winner of Festival Suara Remaja Vinolia (RCTI). Her highest achievement was as the grand champion of Astana International Song Festival 2005 in Kazakhstan.

Despite her success in festivals, Dewi was still unrecognized in the Indonesian music scene. Her debut album, Sweet Heart, was released in 2008 but failed to establish her recording career. She is only recognized by certain communities through her Batak language and religious songs. She released her next pop record, a single entitled "Jejak Luka", under the Nagaswara label in 2010. Dewi quit the label and went back to competition by joining the audition of the U.S. version of The X Factor in 2011. She made it to the bootcamp stage but had to quit the show due to social security.

In late 2012, Dewi auditioned for the premiere of X Factor Indonesia. She was put through to the Gala Live Show under the Over 26 category and mentored by musician Bebi Romeo. During the show, Dewi was a stable contestant with the most standing ovations from the judges. Anggun once stated that she should have been the rival for the judges, not among the contestants. Dewi advanced to the Grand Final round and finished as the runner-up, with a slight difference in public votes, behind Fatin Shidqia.

In August 2013, Dewi released a cover version of Breakeven with Australian Samantha Jade.

== Performances on X Factor Indonesia ==
Dewi performed the following songs on X Factor Indonesia:

| Show | Theme | Song | Original artist | Order | Result |
|---|---|---|---|---|---|
| Audition | Free choice | "If I Were a Boy" | Beyoncé | —N/a | Through to bootcamp |
| Bootcamp 1 | Group performance | "Bunga Terakhir" | Bebi Romeo | —N/a | Through to bootcamp 2 |
| Bootcamp 2 | Stage act/choreography | —N/a | —N/a | —N/a | Through to bootcamp 3 |
| Bootcamp 3 | Solo performance | "Halo" | Beyoncé | —N/a | Through to judges' houses |
| Judges' houses | Free choice | "Exhale (Shoop Shoop)" | Whitney Houston | —N/a | Through to Showcase & Live Show |
| Showcase | Wild Card | "Langit Tak Mendengar" | Peterpan | 5 | Through to Live Show |
| Live show 1 | Mentor's choice | "Love on Top" | Beyoncé | 1 | Safe |
| Live Show 2 | Songs from My Mentor | "Selamat Jalan Kekasih" | Rita Effendy | 11 | Safe |
| Live show 3 | My favorite song | "Cinta di Ujung Jalan" | Agnes Monica | 10 | Safe |
| Live show 4 | Songs from 90s | "I'd Do Anything for Love (But I Won't Do That)" | Meat Loaf | 4 | Safe |
| Live show 5 | Indonesia's mega hits | "Bintang di Surga" | Peterpan | 9 | Safe |
| Live show 6 | My musical inspiration | "Can't Hold Us Down" | Christina Aguilera | 4 | Safe |
| Live Show 7 | Hits of the Century | "Skyscraper" | Demi Lovato | 4 | Safe |
| Live Show 8 | East Meets West | "Mistikus Cinta" | Dewa 19 | 1 | Safe |
| Live Show 8 | East Meets West | "Billie Jean" | Michael Jackson | 7 | Safe |
| Live Show 9 | Music of the Indonesian Women | "Mencintaimu" | Krisdayanti | 3 | Safe |
| Live Show 9 | Music of the Indonesian Women | "Terbang" with Kotak | Kotak | 8 | Safe |
| Live Show 10 | Movie Soundtrack | "Bukan Cinta Biasa" | Afgan | 2 | Safe |
| Live Show 10 | Movie Soundtrack | "Decode" | Paramore | 7 | Safe |
| Live Show 11 | Songs by Noah | "Nothing Compares 2 U" | Sinéad O'Connor | 4 | Safe |
| Live Show 11 | Songs by Noah | "Di Belakangku" | Peterpan | 8 | Safe |
| Road to Grand Final | Viewer's Choices | "Try" | Pink | 1 | Safe |
| Road to Grand Final | Duet with Mentor | "Bawalah Cintaku" feat. Bebi Romeo | Afgan | 4 | Safe |
| Road to Grand Final | Viewer's Choices | "Halo" | Beyoncé | 7 | Safe |
| Grand Final | Celebrity Duets | "Tak Pernah Padam" feat. Sandhy Sondoro | Sandhy Sondoro | 2 | Safe |
| Grand Final | Mentor's Challenge | "Feelin' Good" | Cy Grant | 5 | Safe |
| Grand Final | Winner's Song | "Sampai Habis Airmataku" | Novita Dewi | 8 | Safe |
| Grand Final | Finalist Duet | "Don't Stop Believin'" | Journey | 9 | Safe |
| The Result | Solo Performance | "Alone" | Heart | 2 | Runner Up |
| The Result | Duet with Eliminated Finalist | "Just Give Me a Reason" feat. Alex Rudiart | Pink feat. Nate Ruess | 4 | Runner Up |

== Discography ==
- Sweet Heart (2008)
