= X Factor Indonesia =

Indonesian singing competition

- Genre: Reality television
- Created by: Simon Cowell
- Presented by: Robby Purba
- Judges: Anggun; Ahmad Dhani; Rossa; Bebi Romeo; Afgan; Anang Hermansyah; Judika; Bunga Citra Lestari; Ariel "Noah"; Vidi Aldiano; Marcello Tahitoe
- Country of origin: Indonesia
- Original language: Indonesian
- No. of seasons: 4
- No. of episodes: 67

Production
- Executive producers: Fabian Dharmawan; Glenn Sims; Virgita Ruchiman; Ken Irawati; Aditya Amarullah
- Production locations: Various (auditions); Studio 8 RCTI (live shows season 1 and 2); Studio RCTI+ (live shows and grand finale season 3); Hall D2 JIExpo (grand finale season 1); Ecovention (grand finale season 2)
- Running time: 120–270 minutes (incl. adverts)
- Production companies: Fremantle (PT Dunia Visitama Produksi); Syco Entertainment

Original release
- Network: RCTI
- Release: December 28, 2012 – April 1, 2024

Related
- The X Factor franchise The X Factor (British TV series); The X Factor (American TV series); The X Factor (Australian TV series)

The X Factor Indonesia is an Indonesian reality television music competition to find new singing talent, contested by aspiring singers drawn from public audition. The show was adopted from original British series and produced by FremantleMedia (now Fremantle) and Cowell's production company Syco. It is broadcast on RCTI. In 2014, X Factor Indonesia won the Panasonic Gobel Awards for the category Talent and Best Reality Show.

As part of The X Factor franchise, the show's format has numerous differences from rival shows such as Indonesian Idol. X Factor Indonesia is open to both solo artists and groups and has no upper age limit. For the first three seasons, each judge is assigned one of four categories (five in the third season)—boys between 15 and 25, girls between 15 and 25, individuals 26 and over (split into males and females in the third season), or groups. Starting from the fourth season, each judge is assigned one contestant from three categories—Male, female, and group.

Throughout the live shows, the judges act as mentors to their category, helping to decide song choices, styling, and staging, while judging contestants from the other categories; they also compete to ensure that their act wins the competition, thus making them the winning judge. The original judging panel lineup consisted of Ahmad Dhani, Rossa, Anggun, and Bebi Romeo, with Robby Purba as the sole host. The show has produced four winners to date: Fatin Shidqia (Girls), Jebe & Petty (Groups), Alvin Jonathan (Boys), and Peter Holly (Male).

After a six-year hiatus, on July 10, 2021, Fremantle Indonesia announced that X Factor Indonesia will return with the third season.

== History ==
Although Indonesian Idol went on to become an enormous success and the number one show in Indonesia for seven consecutive seasons, the original United Kingdom version, Pop Idol, did not fare so well. Cowell, who was a judge on Pop Idol, wished to launch a show that he owned the rights to. Pop Idol's first series was massively successful, and while the second series was also successful, the viewer figure for its finale dropped. Some—including Pop Idol judge Pete Waterman— considered Michelle McManus an unworthy winner. In 2004, Pop Idol was axed and ITV announced a new show created by former Pop Idol judge Simon Cowell, with no involvement from Idol creator Simon Fuller—The X Factor. Its ratings were average in the first couple of series, but by the sixth series in 2009, ratings were hitting 10 million each week.

In March 2010, RCTI, the broadcaster of Indonesian Idol, signed the deal to launch the Indonesian version of The X Factor. Initially, X Factor Indonesia was planned as a replacement for Indonesian Idol in 2013, but due to the enormous success of the seventh season in 2012, RCTI and FremantleMedia decided to continue collaborating both the X Factor Indonesia and Indonesian Idol with each playing on alternate years. To repeat the success of seventh season of Indonesian Idol, Fabian Dharmawan from RCTI was appointed to be the Executive Producer for RCTI for the first season of the X Factor Indonesia, Head of Entertainment of FremantleMedia, Glenn Sims together with Virgita Ruchiman and Ken Irawati serving as Executive Producers for FremantleMedia Indonesia (Virgita now as general manager at VIP Production, subsidiary of SCM).

X Factor premiered in Indonesia on December 28, 2012.

== Format and prize ==
=== Categories ===
The show is primarily concerned with identifying singing talent, though appearance, personality, stage presence and dance routines are also an important element of many performances. Each judge is assigned one of four categories: "Girls" (aged 15–25 females), "Boys" (aged 15–25 males), "Over 26s" (solo acts aged 26 and over), or "Groups" (including duos; some of which may be formed from rejected soloists after the audition process). Through the live shows, the judges act as mentors to their category, helping to decide song choices, styling and staging, while judging contestants from other categories. The one and only season that "Over 26s" divided to two categories: "Male" and "Female" based on contestants gender was the third season. In the fourth season, each judge is assigned to pick 3 acts, consist of each category (Female, Male. And Groups).

=== Stages ===
There are five stages to the competition:

- Stage 1: Producers' auditions (these auditions decide who will sing in front of the judges)
- Stage 2: Judges' auditions
- Stage 3: Bootcamp (including a six-chair challenge since season 2)
- Stage 4: Judges' houses (excluding season 4)
- Stage 5: Live shows (finals)

==== Auditions ====
The show is open to solo artists and vocal groups aged 15 and above, with no upper age limit. The first set of auditions is held in front of the show's producers, which is not televised. Only candidates who successfully pass the producers' auditions are invited to perform to the judges. The judges' auditions are held in front of a live audience and the acts sing over a backing track. In that case, at least three out of four judges (two out of three, for the panel of three judges) have to say "yes" for the auditionee to advance to the next round, otherwise they are sent home. In addition, there is an online audition too in which the auditionees can upload their performance on the X Factor Indonesia website and the get the vote from viewers on YouTube. An auditionee with the most voted video will get the chance to meet the judges and awarded cash prize.

A selection of the auditions in front of the judges – usually the best, the worst and the most bizarre – are broadcast over the first few weeks of the show.

==== Bootcamp, Six - Chair Challenges, and judges' home visits ====
The contestants selected at auditions are further refined through a series of performances at "bootcamp", and then at the "six chair challenge", to the "judges' home visit", until a small number eventually progress to the live finals. In the bootcamp, contestants will have to go through a series of challenges until the number of contestants were trimmed down and divided according to their categories. At the end of bootcamp, the producers will also reveal which category the judges will be mentoring. The judges then disband for the "six - chairs challenge" round, where they further reduce their acts to the "judges' home visit" round on which they must selected their three finalist for each season located at a residence with the help of a celebrity guest mentor. In fourth season, the "Judges' Home Visit" round was abolished because each judge can pick one act in 3 category at "The Chairs" round.

==== Live shows ====
The finals consist of a series of two gala live shows, with the first featuring the contestants' performances and the second revealing the results of the public voting. Celebrity guest performers will be featured regularly.

===== Performances =====
The performance show occasionally begins with a group performance from the remaining contestants. The show is primarily concerned with identifying a potential pop star or star group, and singing talent, appearance, personality, stage presence and dance routines are all important elements of the contestants' performances. In the initial live shows, each act performs once in the first show in front of a studio audience and the judges, usually singing over a pre-recorded backing track. Dancers are also commonly featured. Acts occasionally accompany themselves on guitar or piano.

Each live show has had a different theme; each contestant's song is chosen according to the theme. After each act has performed, the judges comment on their performance. Heated disagreements, usually involving judges defending their contestants against criticism, are a regular feature of the show. Once all the acts have appeared, the phone lines open and the viewing public vote on which act they want to keep. Once the number of contestants has been reduced to six, each act would perform twice in the performances show. This continues until only three acts remain. These acts go on to appear in the grand final which decides the overall winner by public vote.

===== Results =====
The two acts polling the fewest votes are revealed. Both these acts have to perform again in a "final showdown", and the judges vote on which of the two to send home. They were able to pick new songs to perform in the "final showdown". Ties are possible as there are four judges voting on which of the two to send home. In the event of a tie the result goes to deadlock, and the act who came last in the public vote is sent home. The actual number of votes cast for each act is not revealed, nor even the order. Once the number of contestants has been reduced to five, the act which polled the fewest votes is automatically eliminated from the competition (the judges do not have a vote; their only role is to comment on the performances).

=== After X Factor Indonesia ===
The winner of the X Factor Indonesia is awarded a recording contract from Sony Music Indonesia for season 1 until 2 and Hits Records since season 3, which would include investments worth 1 billion rupiah, which is claimed as the largest guaranteed prize in Indonesian television history. Several cash rewards from the sponsors, including a new car and motorcycle, is also awarded for the grand finalists in the first season.

== Series overview ==
To date, four seasons have been broadcast, as summarized below.

Contestant in (or mentor of) "Boys"/"Male" category
Contestant in (or mentor of) "Girls"/"Female" category
Contestant in (or mentor of) "26+" category
Contestant in (or mentor of) "Groups" category

X Factor Indonesia series overview
Season	First aired	Last aired	Winner	Runner-up	Third place	Winning mentor	Presenter(s)	Guest Presenter(s)	Guest Co-Presenter(s)	Mentors (chairs' order)					Guest Judge
Season	First aired	Last aired	Winner	Runner-up	Third place	Winning mentor	Presenter(s)	Guest Presenter(s)	Guest Co-Presenter(s)	1	2	3	4	5	Guest Judge
One	December 28, 2012	May 24, 2013	Fatin Shidqia	Novita Dewi	Nu Dimension	Rossa	Robby Purba	No guest presenter	No co-presenter	Ahmad Dhani	Rossa	Anggun	Bebi Romeo	No fifth mentor	Mulan Jameela^{1}
Two	April 3, 2015	September 11, 2015	Jebe & Petty	Clarisa Dewi	Desy Natalia	Rossa	Robby Purba	No guest presenter	No co-presenter	Ahmad Dhani	Rossa	Afgan	Bebi Romeo	No fifth mentor	Ayu Ting Ting
Three	December 13, 2021	April 18, 2022	Alvin Jonathan	2nd Chance	Danar Widianto	Bunga Citra Lestari	Robby Purba	Daniel Mananta	Lolita Agustine	Anang Hermansyah	Rossa	Ariel "Noah"	Bunga Citra Lestari	Judika	Maia Estianty; Armand Maulana
Four	December 11, 2023	April 1, 2024	Peter Holly	Kris Tomahu	Princessa Alicia	Vidi Aldiano	Robby Purba	No guest presenter	No co-presenter	Vidi Aldiano	Marcello Tahitoe	Ariel "Noah"	Bunga Citra Lestari	Judika	Maia Estianty

Notes

1. Mulan Jameela served as guest judge for one of the auditions to replace Anggun temporarily.

== Judges and hosts ==
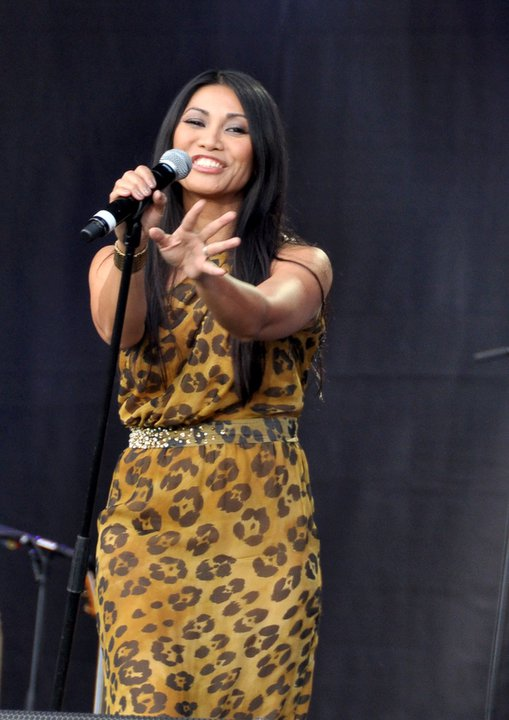
Anggun is one of the judges in the first season.

Many people were rumored to be in the running to join the judging panel, including Indra Lesmana, Titi DJ, Maia Estianty, Vina Panduwinata, Tompi, Anang Hermansyah, Sherina Munaf, Agnes Monica, Ruth Sahanaya, and Iwan Fals. Eventually, Dewa 19-frontman, musician, songwriter, and record producer Ahmad Dhani, singer, musician, and songwriter Bebi Romeo, pop diva Rossa, and international diva Anggun were confirmed to join this show as judges. Pop sensational singer Mulan Jameela filled in for Anggun at the auditions while Anggun was performing in her Europe Live Tour Concert. Numerous people were speculated to host the series, including VJ Boy William and Daniel Mananta, host of Indonesian Idol. On November 23, 2012, ex-VJ Robby Purba was announced as host of the show.

=== Judges' categories and their contestants ===
In each season, each judge is allocated a category to mentor and chooses a small number of acts (three for season one) to progress to the live shows. This table shows, for each season, which category each judge was allocated and which acts he or she put through to the live shows.

Key:

– Winning judge/category. Winners are in bold, eliminated contestants in small font.

Season	Ahmad Dhani	Rossa	Anggun	Bebi Romeo	N/A
One	**Groups**; Nu Dimension; Ilusia Girls; Dalagita	**Girls**; **Fatin Shidqia**; Shena Malsiana; Yohanna Febrianti	**Boys**; Mikha Angelo; Gede Bagus; Dicky Adam	**Over 26s** Novita Dewi; Isa Raja; Alex Rudiart; Agus Hafiluddin	N/A
Season	Ahmad Dhani	Rossa	Afgan	Bebi Romeo	N/A
Two	**Over 26s** Desy Natalia; Angela July; Sulle Wijaya	**Groups**; **Jebe & Petty**; Classy; Jad n Sugy	**Girls**; Clarisa Dewi; Ajeng Astiani; Ismi Riza; Riska Wulandari	**Boys**; Ramli Nurhappi; Aldy Saputra; Siera Latupeirissa	N/A
Season	Anang Hermansyah	Rossa	Ariel "Noah"	Bunga Citra Lestari	Judika
Three	**Females**; Ruth Nelly; Nadhira Ulya; Intan Ayu	**Girls**; Maysha Jhuan; Putu Maydea; Marcella Nursalim	**Groups**; 2nd Chance; GeryGany; Whiz	**Boys**; **Alvin Jonathan**; Danar Widianto; Edo Pratama	**Males**; Roby Gultom; Hendra Nurrahman; Abdurrachman
Season	**Marcello Tahitoe**	**Vidi Aldiano**	**Ariel "Noah"**	**Bunga Citra Lestari**	**Judika**
Four	**Male** Tigor Sihombing **Female** Nafisah Alayyah **Group** Denise Ú Alfi	**Male** **Peter Holly** **Female** Marisa Aprilliyana **Group** TAV	**Male** Zibran Prasetio **Female** Kania Lituhayu **Group** D'Fratts	**Male** Ziad Fauzan **Female** Princessa Alicia **Group** Asmaralaya	**Male** Kris Tomahu **Female** Jetje Margaretha **Group** Circle of Fifth

== Reception ==
=== Television ratings ===
Season	Season premiere	Season premiere viewing figures	Season finale	Season finale viewing figures	Episodes	Average Indonesian viewers in millions
1	28 December 2012	3.2	24 May 2013	6.2	22	4.7
2	3 April 2015	3.7	11 September 2015	2.1	23	3.0
3	13 December 2021	4.7	18 April 2022	3.8	22	TBA

- All information from this table comes from Nielsen Audience Measurement Indonesia.

== Controversy ==
=== Elimination of Alex Rudiart ===
In week six of season one, Ahmad Dhani and Rossa decided to send home Alex Rudiart in favor of Gede Bagus, leading to Alex Rudiart's elimination. This decision resulted in a significant amount of criticism and outrage from the public, who considered the decision unfair. Consequently, numerous reactions began to emerge on social media, including several calls to boycott the show.

== Media sponsorship ==
On September 29, 2012, RCTI, SYCOtv and FremantleMedia Asia announced that Cross Mobile (now Evercoss) would be the official sponsor of the X Factor Indonesia. The sponsorship includes an extensive multi-platform on and off-air marketing partnership. On December 26, Kopi ABC was announced as the second official sponsor of the show. Kopi ABC's sponsorship will also include an extensive multi-platform on and off-air marketing partnership. Indosat Mentari was confirmed as the third official sponsor on December 28. Indosat Mentari's sponsorship of the X Factor Indonesia will also include an extensive multi-platform on and off-air marketing partnership between Indosat and MNC Sky Vision. Oriflame also sponsored the show as the official make-up sponsor. Procter & Gamble using it as a platform to promote its Pantene, Olay and Downy brands. The motorcycle sponsor for the first season of X Factor Indonesia is owned by Honda. In 2015, Evercoss was replaced by Oppo as the official sponsor of the X Factor Indonesia. GIV (Wings Care), Indomie (Indofood) and Teh Pucuk Harum (Mayora Indah) also joined as the official sponsor of the X Factor Indonesia. In 2021, Honda (supporting sponsor in season 1) and Indomie (main sponsor in season 2) rejoined as the official sponsor of the X Factor Indonesia, along with Lazada and Snack Video as main sponsor in season 3.

== Awards and nominations ==
Year	Award	Category	Result
2014	Panasonic Gobel Awards	Program Talent Show & Reality Show	Won
