= X Factor Indonesia season 1 =

X Factor Indonesia
- Season 1
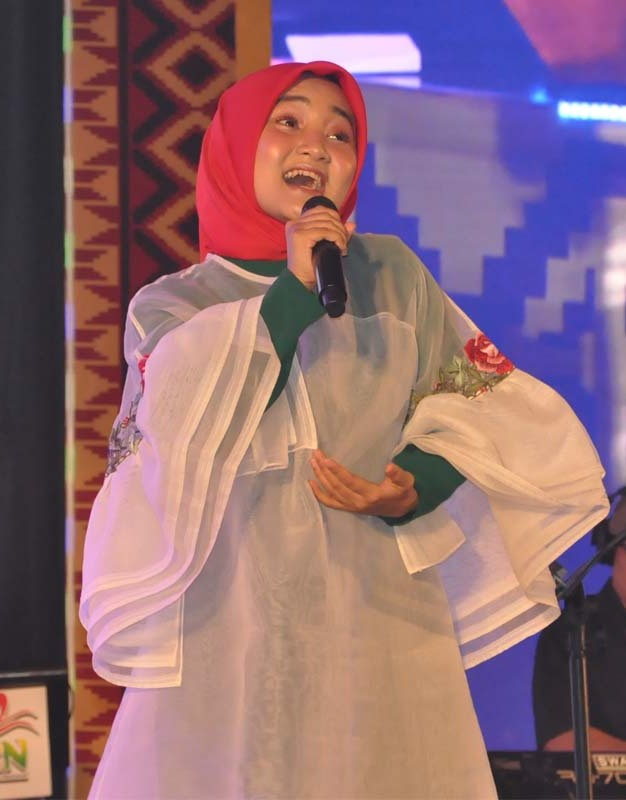
- Hosted by: Robby Purba
- Judges: Ahmad Dhani; Rossa; Anggun; Bebi Romeo; Mulan Jameela (auditions)
- Winner: Fatin Shidqia
- Winning mentor: Rossa
- Runner-up: Novita Dewi

Release
- Original network: RCTI
- Original release: December 28, 2012 – May 24, 2013

Season chronology
- Next → Season 2

X Factor Indonesia is an Indonesian television music competition to find new singing talent; the winner of which receives a 1 billion rupiahs recording contract with Sony Music Indonesia. The first season was started on RCTI on December 28, 2012 and ended on May 24, 2013.

Fatin Shidqia was announced as the winner with debut single "Aku Memilih Setia", and Rossa emerged as the winning mentor.

Based on the British format, the competition consists of auditions, in front of producers and then the judges with a live audience; bootcamp; judges' homes and then the live finals. Auditions for the show began in September 2012 and concluded in November 2012. The show was hosted by ex-VJ Robby Purba, while the judging panel consists of Ahmad Dhani, Rossa, Anggun and Bebi Romeo. Pop singer Mulan Jameela filled in for Anggun at the auditions while Anggun was performing in her Europe Live Tour Concert.

== Judges and hosts ==
Season 1 judges

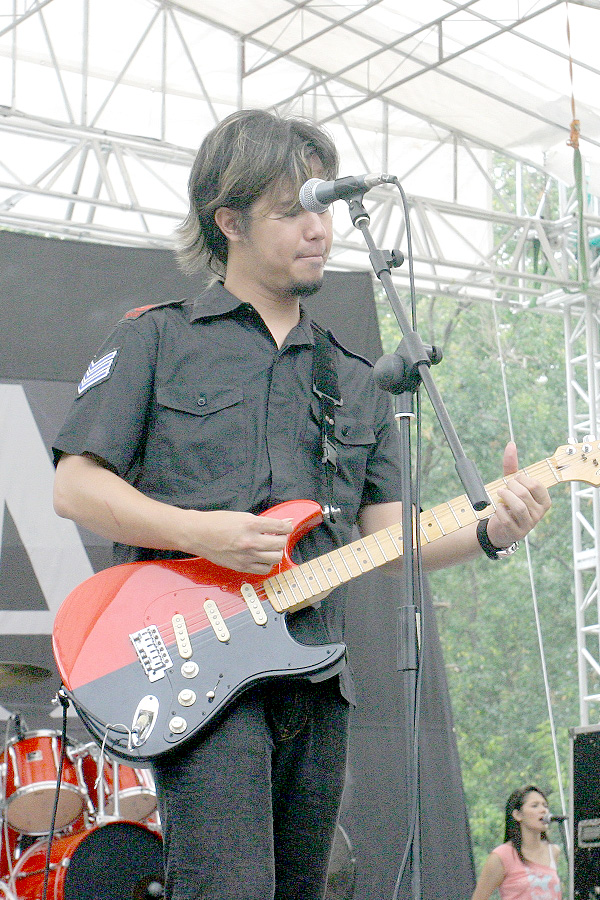
Ahmad Dhani

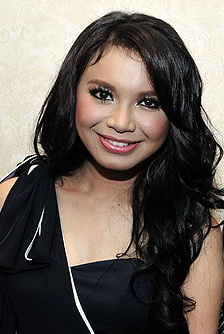
Rossa

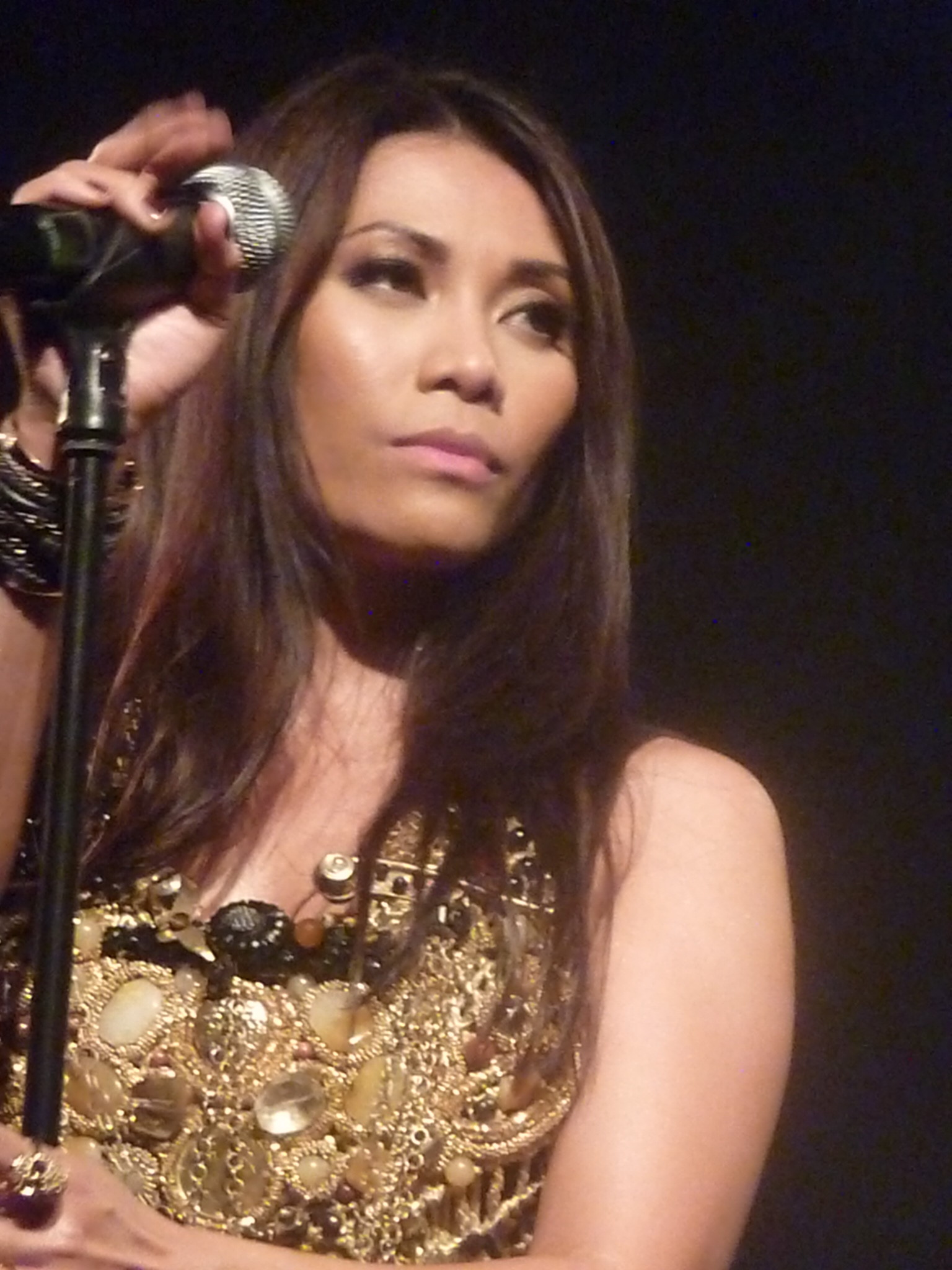
Anggun

Many people were rumored to be in the running to join the judging panel, including Indra Lesmana, Titi DJ, Ahmad Dhani, Rossa, Titi Sjuman, Maia Estianty, Vina Panduwinata, Tompi, Anggun, Anang Hermansyah, Sherina Munaf, Agnes Monica, Ruth Sahanaya, Iwan Fals, Jaclyn Victor, Giring Ganesha and Bebi Romeo. On October 30, 2012, RCTI confirmed that Ahmad Dhani and Bebi Romeo will be the judges of this season by a commercial promo, with two remaining female judges still waiting for a confirmation. On November 12, reports surfaced that Rossa officially signed on to judge the show. It was also rumoured that Agnes Monica was in talks to be the judge. On November 16, Rossa has officially confirmed by her Twitter that she will joining as judge. On November 22 during the filming of the judges' auditions, it was announced that Indonesian-Born International Singer Anggun will be joining the show as a member of the judging panel. However, she missed the audition and bootcamp round due to her Europe Live Tour. Pop sensational singer Mulan Jameela filled in for Anggun as guest judge at the auditions.

Numerous people were speculated to host the series, including VJ Boy William and Daniel Mananta, host of Indonesian Idol. On November 23, 2012, ex-VJ Robby Purba was announced as host of the show.

== Selection process ==
Cities where the auditions were held.

=== Auditions ===
The producers' auditions began on September 29, 2012 at the State University of Medan in Medan, North Sumatra. More producers' auditions were held on October 3 at the Sasana Budaya Ganesha in Bandung, West Java, October 23 at the Balai Prajurit in Surabaya, East Java, November 6 at the Jogja Expo Center in Yogyakarta, Special Region of Yogyakarta and concluded on November 13–14 at the Jakarta International Expo in Jakarta, Jakarta Special Capital Region.

On October 22, 2012, RCTI announced that applicants could upload a video of them singing onto X Factor Indonesia website and it was opened for 5 days only (October 24–28). Selected applicants would appear in front of the judges.

The last set of auditions took place during November 22, 25–28, and December 1–4, 2012 at Studio 8 RCTI. These auditions individually occur simultaneously before both the judges and a live studio audience; and with such audience in attendance able to applaud/cheer approval or disapproval and perhaps influencing the judges.

=== Bootcamp ===
Filming for bootcamp was held on December 18–20, 2012 in Studio 8 RCTI. As with the auditions, there was no sign of Anggun at bootcamp. The bootcamp stage was broadcast in two episodes on January 25 and February 1. The first day of bootcamp saw judges split the 119 acts into their four categories: Boys, Girls, Over-24s and Groups. They received vocal coaching and each category later performed one song: the Boys sang "Harus Terpisah" or "Hargai Aku", the Girls sang "Butiran Debu" or "Rindu", the Over-24s sang "Separuh Aku" or "Bunga Terakhir" and the Groups sang "Could It Be" or "Tak Pernah Padam". At the end of the day, the number of acts was cut to 72. On the second day, acts were given dance lessons by choreographers. The judges then split the number of acts down to two groups, 22 acts through to the next day, and remaining 50 acts must perform once again, with an a cappella performance.

The judges then went on to cut 24 acts. The 48 remaining acts were then given the task of learning one song, making it their own and performing it in front of judges. The judges then chose the final 24 acts, based on these performances. However, they finally chose 26 acts. At the end of the day, judges suggested that the Over 24s category be changed to 26 and Over, as the quality of older singers was high. The Boys and Girls categories then comprised singers aged 15 to 25, rather than 15 to 23. As the groups category was the weakest, four rejected soloists from the Boys category and four from the Girls category were asked to form two groups, as a Girlband, Ilusia Girls and a Boyband, Nu Dimension.

The 26 successful acts were:

- Boys: Adhi Permana, Dicky Adam, Dennis Martha, Gede Bagus, Mikha Angelo, Steven Fasly
- Girls: Yohanna Febrianti, Shena Malsiana, Fatin Shidqia, Theresia Dina, Pratami Marja Jeliana, Melissa Putri, Nurul Fadhila
- Over 26s: Agus Hafiluddin, Alex Rudiart, Novita Dewi, Syarifah Raykhan, Isa Raja, Taufik Hidayat, Lisa Sulistyowati, Dwi Soraya
- Groups: Dalagita, Awan, Jad n Sugy, Nu Dimension, Ilusia Girls

=== Judges' home visit ===
The judges' home visit was the last stage of the selection process. The episode was aired on February 8. This was the debut episode for Anggun as judge and mentor on the show. During this stage, it was revealed that Dhani would mentor the Groups, Rossa would mentor the Girls, Anggun would mentor the Boys, and Bebi would mentor the Over-26s. The final selection process was aided by an assistant per category. Kevin Aprilio joined Dhani at Marina Batavia in Jakarta, Maia Estianty joined Rossa at her private-house in Jakarta, personnel of KLa Project, Lilo joined Anggun at Ubud in Bali, and Sandhy Sondoro joined Bebi at Eco Park in Ancol, Jakarta. At judges' home visit each act performed a song they personally picked and performed it in front of their mentor and his/her assistant.

Summary of judges' home visit
Judge	Category	Location	Assistant(s)	Contestants eliminated	Wildcard
Dhani	Groups	Marina Batavia, Ancol	Kevin Aprilio	Awan, Jad n Sugy	Awan
Anggun	Boys	Ubud, Bali	Lilo KLa	Adhi Permana, Dennis Martha, Steven Fasly	Adhi Permana
Rossa	Girls	Private houses	Maia Estianty	Theresia Dina, Pratami Marja, Melissa Putri, Nurul Fadhila	Theresia Dina
Bebi	Over 26s	Ecopark, Ancol	Sandhy Sondoro	Syarifah Raykhan, Lisa Sulistyowati, Taufik Hidayat, Dwi Soraya, Alex Rudiart	Alex Rudiart

=== Showcase and wildcard ===
Showcase is the first live performance for the 12 acts who made it through to the Gala live show. Each mentor will introduce the acts who best they have to the public. Each act will perform one at a time to show their skills. At the beginning of showcase, it was announced that each judge could bring back one further act back as a wildcard. The public then voted for which of the four wildcards would become the thirteenth finalist. This left one judge with an extra act. Dhani chose Awan, Rossa chose Theresia Dina, Anggun chose Adhi Permana and Bebi chose Alex Rudiart. Alex was revealed as the thirteenth act in the end of showcase.

Contestants' performances on the showcase
Act	Order	Song
Gede Bagus	1	"The Man Who Can't Be Moved"
Dicky Adam	2	"Aku Ini Punya Siapa"
Mikha Angelo	3	"Gravity"
Isa Raja	4	"Radioactive"
Novita Dewi	5	"Langit Tak Mendengar"
Agus Hafiluddin	6	"Kiss from a Rose"
Yohanna Febrianti	7	"Harus Terpisah"
Fatin Shidqia	8	"Diamonds"
Shena Malsiana	9	"Pacar 5 Langkah"
Dalagita	10	"Call Me Maybe"
Ilusia Girls	11	"Love You like a Love Song"
Nu Dimension	12	"Crazy"

Contestants' performances on the wildcard
Act	Order	Song	Result
Adhi Permana	1	"Always Be My Baby"	Eliminated
Awan	2	"What Makes You Beautiful" / "Beautiful"	Eliminated
Theresia Dina	3	"Mengejar Matahari"	Eliminated
Alex Rudiart	4	"What It Takes"	Advanced

== Contestants ==
The top 13 contestants were confirmed as follows;

Key:

– Winner
– Runner-up

Category (mentor)	Acts			
Boys (Anggun)	Mikha Angelo	Gede Bagus	Dicky Adam	
Girls (Rossa)	Yohanna Febrianti	Fatin Shidqia	Shena Malsiana	
Over 26s (Bebi)	Isa Raja	Agus Hafiluddin	Novita Dewi	Alex Rudiart
Groups (Dhani)	Dalagita	Nu Dimension	Ilusia Girls	

== Gala live shows ==
=== Result summary ===
Colour key

–	Contestant was in the bottom two and had to sing again in the final showdown
–	Contestant received the fewest public votes and was immediately eliminated (no final showdown)
–	Contestant received the most public votes

Weekly results per contestant
Contestant	Week 1	Week 2	Week 3	Week 4	Week 5	Week 6	Week 7	Week 8	Week 10^{2}	Week 11	Finals	
Contestant	Week 1	Week 2	Week 3	Week 4	Week 5	Week 6	Week 7	Week 8	Week 10^{2}	Week 11	Round 1	Round 2
Fatin Shidqia	5th 9.0%	3rd 12.4%	2nd 15.1%	3rd 13.1%	4th 10.5%	2nd 16.8%	3rd 13.3%	2nd 21.6%	1st 33.9%	2nd 22.3%	1st 39.4%	Winner; 52.1%
Novita Dewi	10th 4.8%	4th 11.3%	6th 7.4%	4th 11.6%	3rd 11.7%	6th 9.6%	5th 9.8%	4th 13.1%	4th 11.6%	1st 41.8%	2nd 32.3%	Runner-up; 47.9%
Nu Dimension	1st 16.7%	1st 16.9%	1st 16.1%	2nd 14.7%	1st 28.4%	3rd 11.4%	2nd 20.3%	5th 7.6%	2nd 25.4%	3rd 19.7%	3rd 28.3%	Eliminated (Week 13)
Mikha Angelo	2nd 12.6%	2nd 13.3%	3rd 12.7%	1st 19.8%	2nd 12.3%	1st 23.6%	6th 8.6%	1st 35.1%	3rd 18.2%	4th 16.2%	Eliminated (Week 11)	
Shena Malsiana	7th 6.7%	5th 9.4%	5th 8.3%	5th 8.1%	9th 5.6%	4th 10.2%	1st 29.9%	3rd 15.2%	5th 10.9%	Eliminated (Week 10)		
Isa Raja	3rd 10.3%	11th 3.5%	10th 5.5%	8th 6.9%	6th 8.0%	5th 10.0%	4th 11.4%	6th 7.4%	Eliminated (Week 8)			
Gede Bagus	8th 6.0%	8th 6.4%	4th 11.4%	9th 6.3%	7th 7.7%	8th 9.1%	7th 6.7%	Eliminated (Week 7)				
Alex Rudiart	4th 9.3%	6th 7.5%	7th 6.6%	7th 7.2%	5th 8.4%	7th 9.3%	Eliminated (Week 6)					
Agus Hafiluddin	6th 7.1%	7th 7.0%	8th 6.0%	6th 7.4%	8th 7.4%	Eliminated (Week 5)						
Ilusia Girls	12th 4.2%	10th 4.6%	9th 5.8%	10th 4.9%	Eliminated (Week 4)							
Yohanna Febrianti	9th 5.2%	9th 5.1%	11th 5.1%	Eliminated (Week 3)								
Dalagita	11th 4.5%	12th 2.6%	Eliminated (Week 2)									
Dicky Adam	13th 4.1%	Eliminated (Week 1)										
Final showdown	Dicky Adam, Ilusia Girls	Dalagita, Isa Raja	Isa Raja, Yohanna Febrianti	Gede Bagus, Ilusia Girls	Agus Hafiluddin, Shena Malsiana	Alex Rudiart, Gede Bagus	Gede Bagus, Mikha Angelo	Isa Raja, Nu Dimension	No final showdown or judges' votes; results were based on public votes alone			
Dhani's vote to save	Ilusia Girls	Dalagita	Yohanna Febrianti	Ilusia Girls	Shena Malsiana	Gede Bagus	Mikha Angelo	Nu Dimension	No final showdown or judges' votes; results were based on public votes alone			
Rossa's vote to save	Ilusia Girls	Isa Raja	Yohanna Febrianti	Gede Bagus	Shena Malsiana	Gede Bagus	Mikha Angelo	Nu Dimension	No final showdown or judges' votes; results were based on public votes alone			
Anggun's vote to save	Dicky Adam	Isa Raja	Isa Raja	Gede Bagus	Shena Malsiana	Gede Bagus	—N/a^{1}	Isa Raja	No final showdown or judges' votes; results were based on public votes alone			
Bebi's vote to save	Dicky Adam	Isa Raja	Isa Raja	Gede Bagus	Agus Hafiluddin	Alex Rudiart	Mikha Angelo	Isa Raja	No final showdown or judges' votes; results were based on public votes alone			
Eliminated	Dicky Adam; 2 of 4 votes Deadlock	Dalagita; 1 of 4 votes Minority	Yohanna Febrianti; 2 of 4 votes Deadlock	Ilusia Girls; 1 of 4 votes Minority	Agus Hafiluddin; 1 of 4 votes Minority	Alex Rudiart; 1 of 4 votes Minority	Gede Bagus; 0 of 3 votes Minority	Isa Raja; 2 of 4 votes Deadlock	Shena Malsiana; Public vote to eliminate	Mikha Angelo; Public vote to eliminate	Nu Dimension; Public vote to eliminate	Novita Dewi; Runner-up
Eliminated	Dicky Adam; 2 of 4 votes Deadlock	Dalagita; 1 of 4 votes Minority	Yohanna Febrianti; 2 of 4 votes Deadlock	Ilusia Girls; 1 of 4 votes Minority	Agus Hafiluddin; 1 of 4 votes Minority	Alex Rudiart; 1 of 4 votes Minority	Gede Bagus; 0 of 3 votes Minority	Isa Raja; 2 of 4 votes Deadlock	Shena Malsiana; Public vote to eliminate	Mikha Angelo; Public vote to eliminate	Nu Dimension; Public vote to eliminate	Fatin Shidqia; Winner

- ^1 Anggun was not required to vote as there was already a majority.
- ^2 There was no elimination on Week 9 as a part of Kartini's day celebration. All the votes cast will be accumulated to the next week's show.

=== Gala live show details ===
==== Week 1 (February 22) ====
- Theme: Mentor's choice
- Group performance: "One More Night"
- Musical guest: Sandhy Sondoro ("Tak Pernah Padam" / "End of The Time" / "Malam Biru")

Contestants' performances on the first gala live show
Act	Order	Song	Result
Novita Dewi	1	"Love on Top"	Safe
Gede Bagus	2	"Tak Bisa ke Lain Hati"	Safe
Ilusia Girls	3	"Impossible"	Bottom two
Agus Hafiluddin	4	"Sadis"	Safe
Fatin Shidqia	5	"Rumour Has It"	Safe
Dicky Adam	6	"Smells Like Teen Spirit"	Bottom two
Nu Dimension	7	"Careless Whisper"	Safe
Shena Malsiana	8	"(You Make Me Feel Like) A Natural Woman"	Safe
Mikha Angelo	9	"...Baby One More Time"	Safe
Dalagita	10	"My Favorite Things"	Safe
Isa Raja	11	"Losing My Religion"	Safe
Yohanna Febrianti	12	"Sang Dewi"	Safe
Alex Rudiart	13	"Locked Out of Heaven"	Safe
Final showdown details
Ilusia Girls	1	"Set Fire to the Rain"	Safe
Dicky Adam	2	"My Same"	Eliminated

Judges' decisions to save

- Anggun: Dicky Adam – backed her own act
- Dhani: Ilusia Girls – backed his own act
- Bebi: Dicky Adam – thought Dicky Adam gave a massive progress than Ilusia Girls
- Rossa: Ilusia Girls – believed Ilusia Girls has a "strength" in singing

With the acts in the bottom two receiving two votes each, the result was deadlocked and reverted to the earlier public vote. Dicky Adam was eliminated as the act with the fewest public votes.

==== Week 2 (March 1) ====
- Theme: Songs from my mentor
- Group performance: "I Gotta Feeling"
- Musical guest: Slank ("Kuil Cinta")

Contestants' performances on the second gala live show
Act	Order	Song	Result
Nu Dimension	1	"Cinta Itu Buta"	Safe
Agus Hafiluddin	2	"Andai Aku Bisa"	Safe
Isa Raja	3	"Aku Cinta Kau dan Dia"	Bottom two
Mikha Angelo	4	"Jadi Milikmu (Crazy)"	Safe
Dalagita	5	"Roman Picisan"	Bottom two
Ilusia Girls	6	"Satu-satunya Cinta"	Safe
Shena Malsiana	7	"Cinta"	Safe
Gede Bagus	8	"Snow on the Sahara"	Safe
Yohanna Febrianti	9	"Tak Berpaling Darimu"	Safe
Alex Rudiart	10	"Perbedaan"	Safe
Novita Dewi	11	"Selamat Jalan Kekasih"	Safe
Fatin Shidqia	12	"Pudar"	Safe
Final showdown details
Dalagita	1	"The Lonely Goatherd"	Eliminated
Isa Raja	2	"The Only Exception"	Safe

Judges' decisions to save

- Dhani: Dalagita – backed his own act
- Bebi: Isa Raja – backed his own act
- Anggun: Isa Raja – gave no reason
- Rossa: Isa Raja – gave no reason

==== Week 3 (March 8) ====
- Theme: My favourite song
- Group performance: "Malam Ini Indah"
- Musical guest: Cakra Khan ("Harus Terpisah")

Contestants' performances on the third gala live show
Act	Order	Song	Result
Ilusia Girls	1	"Stayin' Alive"	Safe
Isa Raja	2	"Where the Streets Have No Name"	Bottom two
Gede Bagus	3	"Time After Time"	Safe
Shena Malsiana	4	"Turning Tables"	Safe
Agus Hafiluddin	5	"Cry Me a River"	Safe
Mikha Angelo	6	"The A Team"	Safe
Fatin Shidqia	7	"Girl on Fire"	Safe
Yohanna Febrianti	8	"Cinta Ini Takkan Mati"	Bottom two
Alex Rudiart	9	"We Are Young"	Safe
Novita Dewi	10	"Cinta di Ujung Jalan"	Safe
Nu Dimension	11	"Thriller"	Safe
Final showdown details
Yohanna Febrianti	1	"1-2-3"	Eliminated
Isa Raja	2	"Human"	Safe

Judges' decisions to save

- Rossa: Yohanna Febrianti – backed her own act
- Bebi: Isa Raja – backed his own act
- Dhani: Yohanna Febrianti – gave no reason
- Anggun: Isa Raja – gave no reason

With the acts in the bottom two receiving two votes each, the result was deadlocked and reverted to the earlier public vote. Yohanna Febrianti was eliminated as the act with the fewest public votes.

==== Week 4 (March 15) ====
- Theme: Songs from 90's
- Group performance: "Livin' la Vida Loca" / "Let's Get Loud" / "Smooth"
- Musical guest: Anggun ("Bayang-Bayang Ilusi" / "Takut")

Contestants' performances on the fourth gala live show
Act	Order	Song	Result
Agus Hafiluddin	1	"Iris"	Safe
Nu Dimension	2	"One Last Cry"	Safe
Mikha Angelo	3	"Ordinary World"	Safe
Novita Dewi	4	"I'd Do Anything for Love (But I Won't Do That)"	Safe
Gede Bagus	5	"I Don't Want to Miss a Thing"	Bottom two
Alex Rudiart	6	"Suci Dalam Debu"	Safe
Isa Raja	7	"Give Me One Reason"	Safe
Fatin Shidqia	8	"Don't Speak"	Safe
Ilusia Girls	9	"(Everything I Do) I Do It for You"	Bottom two
Shena Malsiana	10	"Inikah Cinta"	Safe
Final showdown details
Gede Bagus	1	"You Give Me Something"	Safe
Ilusia Girls	2	"You and I"	Eliminated

Judges' decisions to save

- Anggun: Gede Bagus – backed her own act
- Dhani: Ilusia Girls – backed his own act
- Rossa: Gede Bagus – gave no reason
- Bebi: Gede Bagus – believed Ilusia Girls will be more successful as solo artists after the show

==== Week 5 (March 22) ====
- Theme: Mega Hits Indonesia
- Group performance: "Masih Ada"
- Musical guest: Ahmad Dhani ("Sabda Alam")

Contestants' performances on the fifth gala live show
Act	Order	Song	Result
Gede Bagus	1	"Sedang Ingin Bercinta"	Safe
Shena Malsiana	2	"Ratu Sejagad"	Bottom two
Isa Raja	3	"Yang Terlupakan"	Safe
Alex Rudiart	4	"Beraksi"	Safe
Nu Dimension	5	"Kirana"	Safe
Fatin Shidqia	6	"Perahu Kertas"	Safe
Agus Hafiluddin	7	"Dealova"	Bottom two
Mikha Angelo	8	"Sempurna"	Safe
Novita Dewi	9	"Bintang di Surga"	Safe
Final showdown details
Shena Malsiana	1	"Misty"	Safe
Agus Hafiluddin	2	"Home"	Eliminated

Judges' decisions to save

- Rossa: Shena Malsiana – backed her own act who she felt has more "X" factor
- Bebi: Agus Hafiluddin – backed his own act, stating that Agus gave a massive progress
- Dhani: Shena Malsiana – gave no reason
- Anggun: Shena Malsiana – gave no reason

==== Week 6 (March 29) ====
- Theme: My musical inspiration
- Group performance: "Let's Get It Started"
- Musical guest: Regina Ivanova ("I Will Always Love You") and Judika ("Sweet Child o' Mine")

Contestants' performances on the sixth gala live show
Act	Order	Song	Musical inspiration	Result
Mikha Angelo	1	"Love of My Life"	Queen	Safe
Alex Rudiart	2	"Crazy"	Aerosmith	Bottom two
Shena Malsiana	3	"Creep"	Radiohead	Safe
Novita Dewi	4	"Can't Hold Us Down"	Christina Aguilera	Safe
Gede Bagus	5	"Yesterday"	The Beatles	Bottom two
Isa Raja	6	"Englishman in New York"	Sting	Safe
Nu Dimension	7	"Killer Queen"	Queen	Safe
Fatin Shidqia	8	"It Will Rain"	Bruno Mars	Safe
Final showdown details
Gede Bagus	1	"Malam Biru"		Safe
Alex Rudiart	2	"Time for Miracles"		Eliminated

Judges' decisions to save

- Anggun: Gede Bagus – backed her own act
- Bebi: Alex Rudiart – backed his own act
- Dhani: Gede Bagus – voted as a tribute to Gede's mom birthday
- Rossa: Gede Bagus – chose to go with her heart and based her decision on the final showdown performances

==== Week 7 (April 5) ====
- Theme: Hits of the century
- Group performance: "Gangnam Style" / "Party Rock Anthem" / "Harlem Shake"
- Musical guest: Ari Lasso ("Mengejar Matahari" / "Arti Cinta") and Tompi ("Menghujam Jantungku" / "Locked Out of Heaven")

Contestants' performances on the seventh gala live show
Act	Order	Song	Result
Shena Malsiana	1	"Paradise"	Safe
Gede Bagus	2	"Rahasia Perempuan"	Bottom two
Isa Raja	3	"Mr. Brightside"	Safe
Novita Dewi	4	"Skyscraper"	Safe
Mikha Angelo	5	"Viva la Vida"	Bottom two
Fatin Shidqia	6	"Mercy"	Safe
Nu Dimension	7	"Toxic"	Safe
Final showdown details
Mikha Angelo	1	"I Won't Give Up"	Safe
Gede Bagus	2	"Anak Jalanan"	Eliminated

Judges' decisions to save

- Rossa: Mikha Angelo – gave no specific reason, though admitted that she adored both acts
- Bebi: Mikha Angelo – admitted that Gede Bagus did well in the singoff but felt that the competition still needed Mikha
- Dhani: Mikha Angelo – gave no reason
- Anggun was not required to vote as there was already a majority

==== Week 8 (April 12) ====
- Theme: East meets west
- Group performance: "Tetap Semangat" / "I Love Rock 'n' Roll"

For the first time this season, each contestant performed two songs.

Contestants' performances on the eighth gala live show
Act	Order	First song	Order	Second song	Result
Novita Dewi	1	"Mistikus Cinta"	7	"Billie Jean"	Safe
Fatin Shidqia	2	"Arti Hadirmu"	8	"These Words"	Safe
Nu Dimension	3	"Istimewa"	9	"Don't You Worry Child"	Bottom two
Shena Malsiana	4	"Aku Bukan Bang Toyib"	10	"No One"	Safe
Isa Raja	5	"Separuh Nafas"	11	"Come Together"	Bottom two
Mikha Angelo	6	"Lilin-Lilin Kecil"	12	"What Makes You Beautiful"	Safe
Final showdown details
Isa Raja	1	"Lovesong"			Eliminated
Nu Dimension	2	"After the Love Has Gone"			Safe

Judges' decisions to save

- Dhani: Nu Dimension – backed his own act
- Bebi: Isa Raja – backed his own act
- Rossa: Nu Dimension – stated that she loved their harmony in the singoff
- Anggun: Isa Raja – adored both acts, but stated that she has been a fan of Isa Raja since the very beginning

With the acts in the bottom two receiving two votes each, the result was deadlocked and reverted to the earlier public vote. Isa Raja was eliminated as the act with the fewest public votes.

==== Week 9 (April 19) ====
- Theme: Music of the women of Indonesia
- Group performance: "Hanya Memuji"

The theme was billed as a part of Kartini's day celebrations. For the first time this season, each contestant performed in a duet with Indonesian female singer. It was also announced that the votes cast will be used for charity purpose.

Contestants' performances on the ninth gala live show
Act	Order	First song	Order	Second song (duet)	Result
Shena Malsiana	1	"Satu Jam Saja"	6	"Biru" (with Vina Panduwinata)	Bottom two^{3}
Mikha Angelo	2	"Mimpi"	7	"Jika" (with Melly Goeslaw)	Bottom two^{3}
Novita Dewi	3	"Mencintaimu"	8	"Terbang" (with Kotak)	Safe
Nu Dimension	4	"Jatuh Cinta Lagi"	9	"Cinta Mati III" (with Mulan Jameela)	Safe
Fatin Shidqia	5	"Jalan Cinta"	10	"Logika" (with Vina Panduwinata)	Safe

^3 Neither Shena nor Mikha were sent home as the host then announced that both acts were safe. There was no elimination as a part of Kartini's day celebrations and the votes cast would still be counted for the following week.

==== Week 10 (April 26) ====
- Theme: Mentor's choice; movie soundtrack
- Group performance: "Ain't No Mountain High Enough"
- Musical guest: Haley Reinhart ("Bennie and the Jets")

Contestants' performances on the tenth gala live show
Act	Order	First song	Order	Second song	Movie	Result
Mikha Angelo	1	"Separuh Aku"	6	"A Thousand Years"	The Twilight Saga: Breaking Dawn – Part 1	Safe
Novita Dewi	2	"Bukan Cinta Biasa"	7	"Decode"	Twilight	Safe
Shena Malsiana	3	"Aku Rindu Padamu"	8	"Skyfall"	Skyfall	Eliminated
Fatin Shidqia	4	"Pelan-Pelan Saja"	9	"Lovefool"	Romeo + Juliet	Safe
Nu Dimension	5	"Masih Ada"	10	"Supermassive Black Hole"	Twilight	Safe

The Top 5 did not feature a final showdown and instead the act with the fewest public votes, Shena Malsiana, were automatically eliminated.

==== Week 11: Semi-final (May 3) ====
- Theme: Contestant's choice (English-language songs); songs by Noah/Peterpan (billed as "night of the superstars")
- Guest mentor: Noah
- Group performance: "Khayalan Tingkat Tinggi"
- Musical guest: Lenka ("Trouble Is a Friend") and Noah ("Hidup Untukmu Mati Tanpamu")

Contestants' performances on the eleventh gala live show
Act	Order	First song	Order	Second song	Result
Mikha Angelo	1	"Crazy Love"	5	"Mungkin Nanti" / "I Will Wait"	Eliminated
Fatin Shidqia	2	"One Way or Another"	6	"Tak Ada Yang Abadi" / "Sahabat"	Safe
Nu Dimension	3	"Points of Authority"	7	"Cobalah Mengerti"	Safe
Novita Dewi	4	"Nothing Compares 2 U"	8	"Di Belakangku"	Safe

The semi-final did not feature a final showdown and instead the act with the fewest public votes, Mikha Angelo, were automatically eliminated.

==== Finals (May 10/17/24) ====
===== May 10 =====
- Theme: Viewers' choice; mentor duets; song of the season (billed as "road to the grand final")
- Group performance: "It's My Life" and "Relax, Take It Easy" (with Mika)
- Musical guest: Anggun ("Snow on the Sahara")

The viewers were allowed to choose two songs to be sung by the finalists via the official Facebook page from Saturday, May 4 to Monday, May 6. One song will be their favorite performance from the finalists within the competition and the other one will be a new song.

Contestants' performances on the road to the grand final
Act	Order	First song	Order	Second song (duet)	Order	Third song
Novita Dewi	1	"Try"	4	"Bawalah Cintaku" (with Bebi Romeo)	7	"Halo"
Nu Dimension	2	"Only Girl (In the World)"	5	"Virtual Insanity" (with Ahmad Dhani)	8	"Man in the Mirror"
Fatin Shidqia	3	"Everything at Once"	6	"Material Girl" (with Rossa)	9	"Grenade"

Notes

- The lines were opened during the whole week and the act who finished at third place will be announced during the grand final on May 17, where the Top 2 will perform their winner's single for the very first time.

===== May 17 =====
- Theme: Superstar duets; no theme; winner's single (billed as the "grand final")
- Group performance: "One Love"
- Musical guest: Setia Band ("Lady Sky")

Contestants' performances on the grand final
Act	Order	First song (duet)	Order	Second song	Order	Third song	Result
Fatin Shidqia	1	"Katakan Tidak" (with Afgan)	4	"Stay"	7	"Aku Memilih Setia"	Safe
Novita Dewi	2	"Tak Pernah Padam" (with Sandhy Sondoro)	5	"Feeling Good"	8	"Sampai Habis Air Mataku"	Safe
Nu Dimension	3	"Musnah"/"Immortal Love Song" (with Andra and The BackBone)	6	"A Little Piece of Heaven"	N/A	N/A (already eliminated)	Eliminated

===== May 24 =====
- Group performance: "Smells Like Teen Spirit" / "My Favourite Things" / "Sang Dewi" / "You and I" / "Kiss from a Rose" / "Locked Out of Heaven" / "Time After Time" / "Mr. Brightside" / "Aku Bukan Bang Toyib" / "Ordinary World" / "Don't You Worry Child" / "Reach" (all finalists)

The winner announcement was held in Hall D2 JIExpo, Kemayoran, South Jakarta.

Contestants' performances on the result show
Act	Order	First song	Order	Second song (duet)	Result
Fatin Shidqia	1	"Well, Well, Well"	3	"Good Time" (with Mikha Angelo)	Winner
Novita Dewi	2	"Alone"	4	"Just Give Me a Reason" (with Alex Rudiart)	Runner-up

Notes

- The judges also performed each other's single during the Result Show. Ahmad Dhani performed first by piano, singing Afgan's "Sadis" (written by Bebi Romeo), followed by Bebi Romeo performed Rossa's "Ayat Ayat Cinta" with a piano. Rossa then sang Anggun's "Mimpi" and Anggun took the stage last to perform Dewa 19's "Risalah Hati".
- At the end of the Result Show, all finalists and judges performed USA for Africa's "We Are the World".

== Reception ==
=== Ratings ===
Ep. #	Episode	Original airdate	Timeslot	Rating	Share	Rank
1	Auditions 1	December 28	Friday 9:00 pm–11:00 pm	3.2	20.6	No. 4
2	Auditions 2	January 4	Friday 9:00 pm–11:00 pm	4.7	20.8	No. 4
3	Auditions 3	January 11	Friday 9:00 pm–11:45 pm	4.5	21.8	No. 4
4	Auditions 4	January 18	Friday 9:00 pm–11:45 pm	3.9	21.1	No. 5
5	Bootcamp 1	January 25	Friday 9:00 pm–11:35 pm	4.7	25.5	No. 2
6	Bootcamp 2	February 1	Friday 9:00 pm–11:45 pm	4.9	24.4	No. 2
7	Judges' home visit	February 8	Friday 9:10 pm–12:00 am	4.5	26.2	No. 1
8	Showcase	February 15	Friday 9:00 pm–1:00 am	4.9	30.3	No. 2
9	Gala show & results 1	February 22	Friday 9:00 pm–1:30 am	4.2	27.9	No. 2
10	Gala show & results 2	March 1	Friday 9:00 pm–1:30 am	5.4	33.6	No. 1
11	Gala show & results 3	March 8	Friday 9:00 pm–1:30 am	4.4	29.9	No. 2
12	Gala show & results 4	March 15	Friday 9:00 pm–1:30 am	4.9	31.6	No. 2
13	Gala show & results 5	March 22	Friday 9:00 pm–1:00 am	4.7	30.4	No. 2
14	Gala show & results 6	March 29	Friday 9:00 pm–1:30 am	5.4	26.8	No. 2
15	Gala show & results 7	April 5	Friday 9:00 pm–1:00 am	4.1	26.4	No. 3
16	Gala show & results 8	April 12	Friday 9:00 pm–1:30 am	4.6	28.4	No. 1
17	Gala show & results 9	April 19	Friday 9:00 pm–1:00 am	4.4	30	No. 2
18	Gala show & results 10	April 26	Friday 9:00 pm–1:30 am	4.1	25.2	#2
19	Gala show & results 11	May 3	Friday 9:00 pm–12:55 am	4.9	26.7	#1
20	Road to Grand Final	May 10	Friday 9:00 pm–1:10 am	5.0	28.5	#1
21	Grand Final	May 17	Friday 8:00 pm–12:10 am	7.5	47	#1
22	Winner Announcement	May 24	Friday 8:00 pm–12:30 am	9.8	67.8	#1

=== Controversy ===
In week six of gala show, Ahmad Dhani and Rossa opted to send home Alex Rudiart in favor of Gede Bagus, causing the elimination of Alex Rudiart. This decision resulted in large amount of criticisms and outrages from the public, who claimed the decision as unfair. As a result, a lot of social media reactions begin to appear including several motions to boycott the show.

However, the Boikot group had little to no effect on the immense success of the first season and the hype (and ratings) continued to build cementing X Factor as a phenomenon in Indonesian TV history. The Boikot group was disbanded as a result of its inability to have any success.
