= Nu Dimension =

Indonesian boy band

- Also known as: NUDI (pronounced nu-di)
- Origin: Indonesia
- Genres: Pop, Rock, Alternative Rock, R&B
- Years active: 2012–?
- Members: Romy Syalasa Putra; Johanan Ariel Matulessy; Bagus Cahya Adi; Ryan Hartanto Tedja
- Website: Nu Dimension's Fansite www.itsnudimension.com

Nu Dimension are an Indonesian four-piece boy band formed in 2012, consisting of members Romy Syalasa Putra, Johanan Ariel Matulessy, Bagus Cahya Adi and Ryan Hartanto Tedja. They were formed exclusively for the first season Indonesian version of The X Factor. They signed with Ahmad Dhani's Republik Cinta Management after being formed and finishing third in the first season X Factor Indonesia.

== History ==
=== 2012-present: Formation and The X Factor ===
Nu Dimension are four solo artists who met during boot camp for the first season Indonesian version of The X Factor. The members of the group are Romy Syalasa, Joel Matulessy, Bagus Cahya and Ryan Hartanto. They successfully auditioned as soloists but failed on a bootcamp challenge. Then they were later formed as a group by the judges to give them another chance. They performed Michael Jackson's "Man in the Mirror" at the judges' home visit round and was selected to join Dhani in the live shows. In week 1, they sang George Michael's "Careless Whisper" and received positive feedback from the judges. They successfully surprised the judges after performing Michael Jackson's "Thriller" with Halloween-themed setting in week 3. For the first 3 weeks, Nu Dimension always placed number one at the end of the episodes. In week 4, they sang Brian McKnight's "One Last Cry". In week 6, they sang Queen's "Killer Queen" and received mixed feedback from the judges, where some judges were not impressed with the song choice. Despite this, they received another praise from the judges in the following week after performing Britney Spears' "Toxic". In week 8, they sang "Istimewa" and "Don't You Worry Child". Despite receiving positive feedback from the judges, they were in the bottom two with Isa Raja and sang "After the Love Has Gone" for survival. Dhani and Rossa voted in their favor, but Anggun and Bebi voted to save Isa Raja instead, causing the judges' votes to be deadlocked and reverted to the public vote. It was then revealed that Isa Raja received fewer votes, causing Nu Dimension to stay in the competition for another week. In week 9, they collaborate with Mulan Jameela sing "Cinta Mati III" and received a negative feedback by the judges and said that they just sounds like a 'backing vocalists'. In week 10 they sang an epic performance "Supermassive Black Hole" and received praises by the judges. In week 11, they sang "Points of Authority" by Linkin Park and the judges said that it was the best performance of the night, And a tribute song "Cobalah Mengerti" by Noah. In The Top Three, They sang "Only Girl" by Rihanna and received a positive feedback from the judges. In the second song, they sang "Virtual Insanity" with collaborated with Their mentor and received a funny feedback, other judges said Nu Dimension shouldn't be in wrong way and shouldn't collaborated with their mentor.

==== Performances on X Factor Indonesia season 1 ====
Nu Dimension performed the following songs on X Factor Indonesia:

| Show | Theme | Song | | | | Order | Result |
| Show | Theme | Romy | El | Bagus | Ryan | Order | Result |
|---|---|---|---|---|---|---|---|
| Audition | Free choice | "Wild World" | "Kasih Putih" | "Just The Way You Are" | "I Believe I Can Fly" | — | Through to bootcamp |
| Bootcamp 1 | Group Challenge | "Separuh Aku" | "Hargai Aku" | "Harus Terpisah" | "Harus Terpisah" | — | Through to Bootcamp 2 |
| Bootcamp 2 | Free choice | — | — | "Bento" | "Semua Untuk Cinta" | — | Through to Bootcamp 3 |
| Bootcamp 3 | Free Choice | "Mobil Balap" | "Kisah Romantis" | "Cemburu" | "This Love" | — | Regrouped/Through to Judges' Home Visit |
| Judges' Home Visit | Free Choice | "Man in the Mirror" | | | | — | Through to Showcase |
| Show Case | Free Choice | "Crazy" | | | | 12 | Through to Live Show |
| Live Show 1 | Mentor's Choice | "Careless Whisper" | | | | 7 | Safe |
| Live Show 2 | Songs from my mentor | "Cinta Itu Buta" | | | | 1 | Safe |
| Live Show 3 | My favorite song | "Thriller" | | | | 11 | Safe |
| Live Show 4 | Songs from 90's | "One Last Cry" | | | | 2 | Safe |
| Live Show 5 | Indonesia's mega hits | "Kirana" | | | | 5 | Safe |
| Live Show 6 | My musical inspiration | "Killer Queen" | | | | 7 | Safe |
| Live Show 7 | Hits of the century | "Toxic" | | | | 7 | Safe |
| Live Show 8 | East's song | "Istimewa" | | | | 3 | Bottom two |
| Live Show 8 | West's song | "Don't You Worry Child" | | | | 9 | Bottom two |
| Live Show 9 | Music of the women of Indonesia | "Jatuh Cinta Lagi" | | | | 4 | Safe |
| Live Show 9 | Duet with Indonesian female singers | "Cinta Mati III" with Mulan Jameela | | | | 9 | Safe |
| Live Show 10 | Mentor's choice | "Masih Ada" | | | | 5 | Safe |
| Live Show 10 | Movie soundtrack | "Supermassive Black Hole" from Twilight | | | | 10 | Safe |
| Live Show 11 | Contestant's choice | "Points of Authority" | | | | 3 | Safe |
| Live Show 11 | Songs by Noah/Peterpan | "Cobalah Mengerti" | | | | 7 | Safe |
| Live Show 12 | Viewers' choice | "Only Girl (In the World)" | | | | 2 | Safe |
| Live Show 12 | Mentor duets | "Virtual Insanity" | | | | 5 | Safe |
| Live Show 12 | Song of the season | "Man in the Mirror" | | | | 8 | Safe |
| Grand Finale Round 1 | Superstar duet | "Musnah"/"Immortal Love Song" with Andra and The BackBone | | | | 3 | Eliminated |
| Grand Finale Round 1 | Contestant's choice | "A Little Piece of Heaven" | | | | 6 | Eliminated |

== Members ==
=== Romy Syalasa ===
Romy Syalasa Putra, born 11 January 1987 (age 38), is from Mataram, West Nusa Tenggara. His first audition was "Wild World" by Mr. Big's version.

=== Bagus Cahya ===
Bagus Cahya Adi, born 24 August 1991 (age 33), is from Wonogiri, Central Java. His first audition was "Just The Way You Are by Bruno Mars.

=== Joel Matulessy ===
Johanan Ariel "El" Matulessy, born 6 November 1994 (age 30), is from Makassar. His first audition was "Kasih Putih" by Glenn Fredly.

=== Ryan Hartanto ===
Ryan Hartanto Tedja, born 27 April 1995 (age 29), is from Surabaya, East Java. His first audition was "I Believe I Can Fly" by R. Kelly.
