= Bebi Romeo =

- Born: Virdy Megananda; 6 September 1974 (age 51); Jakarta, Indonesia
- Genres: Pop, rock
- Occupations: Musician, singer, songwriter, record producer, businessman
- Instruments: Vocals, guitar, piano
- Years active: 1994–present
- Label: Mega Music

H. Virdy Megananda (born 6 September 1974), known popularly as Bebi Romeo, is an Indonesian musician. He began his career in the mid-1990s as the vocalist of band Bima. Before their disbandment, the band released their only studio album, Sebuah Awal (1996), which featured single "Dua Hati". Bebi achieved his prominence in music scene after forming band Romeo in 1998. The band's most popular hit "Bunga Terakhir" (1999) was composed by Bebi himself. He has released four studio albums as the vocalist of the band.

Bebi Romeo has regularly written and produced hit songs for many notable Indonesian recording artists, such as Krisdayanti, Ari Lasso, Chrisye, Rita Effendy, Reza Artamevia, and Afgansyah Reza. At the 2000 Anugerah Musik Indonesia, Bebi received the award for Best Record of the Year for "Mencintaimu" (sung by Krisdayanti). In 2012, Bebi wrote "Do You Really Love Me" as a collaboration with American vocal group Boyz II Men. He became one of the judges for the first season of X Factor Indonesia, alongside Anggun, Ahmad Dhani and Rossa.

== Private life ==
He married Meisya Siregar on 11 December 2004 and together they have 3 children.

== Discography ==
As the vocalist of Bima

- Sebuah Awal (1996)

As the vocalist of Romeo

- Romeo (1998)
- Bunga Terakhir (1999)
- Wanita (2002)
- Lelaki Untukmu (2006)

As composer and solo artist

- The Singer-Songwriter (2005)
- Bebi Romeo Various Artist (2011)
- Bebi Romeo Mega Hits (2012)
- Bebi Romeo Masterpiece (2012)
