= Ratu (band) =

Indonesian music duo

- Mulan Kwok and Maia Ahmad

Background information
- Origin: Jakarta, Indonesia
- Genres: Pop, rock, R&B
- Years active: 1999–2007
- Labels: Sony Music, Columbia Records
- Past members: Maia Estianty; Pinkan Mambo; Mulan Jameela
- Website: raturatu.com (closed)

Ratu (lit. 'Queen') was an Indonesian music duo formed in 1999 with Maia Estianty, then the wife of musician Ahmad Dhani, on instruments and Pinkan Mambo on vocals. Ratu entered the Indonesian musical scene with their first album, Bersama (Together; 2003). After a short break caused by Mambo's departure in 2004, the group formed anew with Mulan Kwok as vocalist. This new line-up proved more successful, with their most successful songs – "Teman Tapi Mesra" ("Friends with Benefits") and "Lelaki Buaya Darat" ("Womaniser" (Note: The term literally means "Man who is like a Crocodile on the Land")) – released in this period; both song titles later became common terms in the Indonesian vocabulary. The group's second studio album, No. Satu (Number One; 2006), sold 200,000 copies on the day of its release, a record for an album by an Indonesian female group. The group dissolved in 2007.

Ratu was the most successful female Indonesian music group of the 2000s. Aside from their music, they were known for their physical appearance and wide coverage in the entertainment media. Through their choice of costumes, Ratu popularised Harajuku styles in Indonesia. Throughout their career, the band won numerous awards; they were the first musical act to twice be declared "Artist of the Year" and "Group/Duo Artist of the Year" at the MTV Ampuh Music awards. This success inspired numerous other groups to follow in their tracks.

== Career ==
=== Formation and first record ===
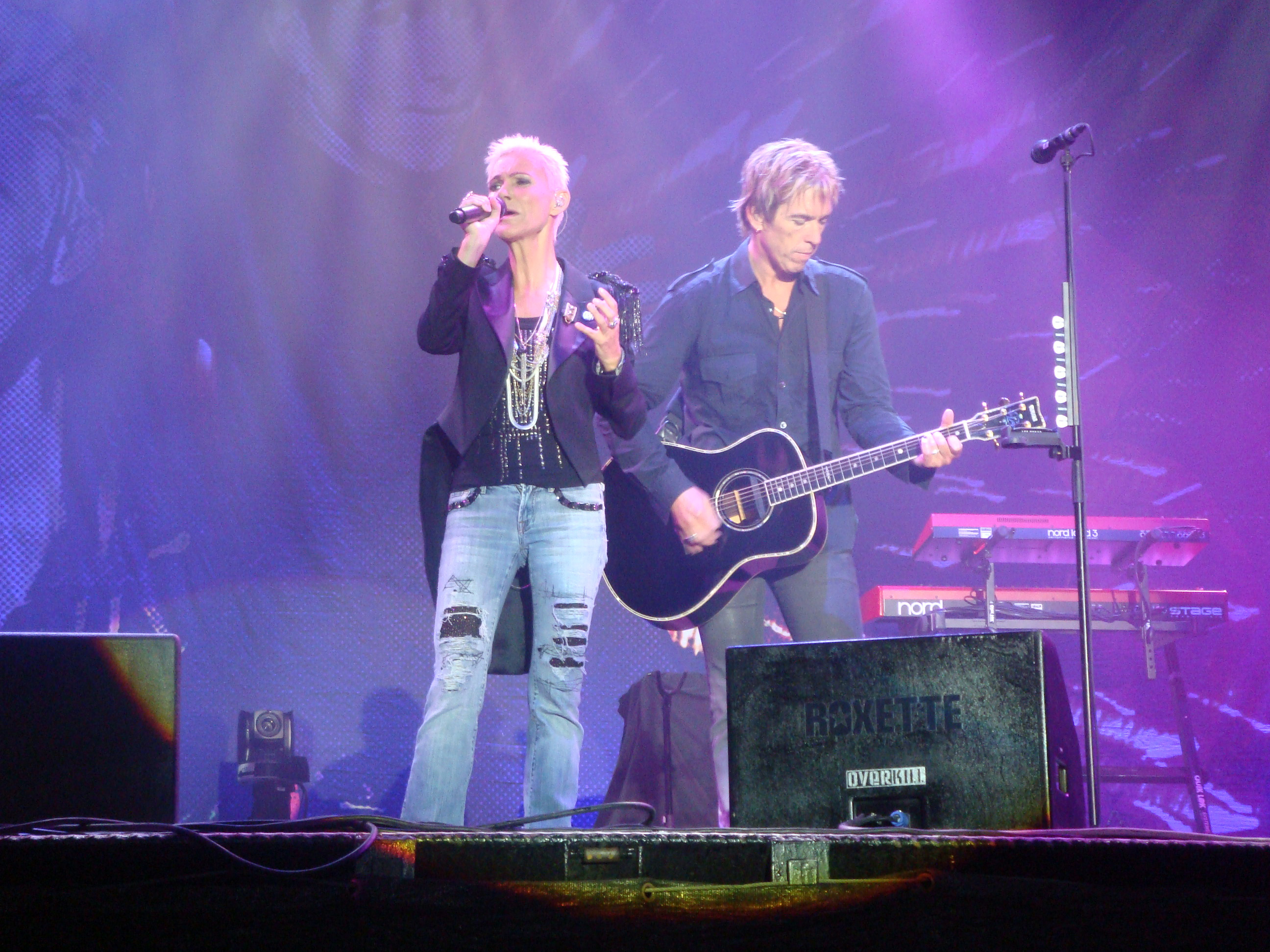
The vocalist-musician duo concept for Ratu was based on that of the Swedish band Roxette.

Maia Ahmad, at the time wife of the musician Ahmad Dhani, had been a background singer for her husband's band Dewa 19 since 1993. She had been musically inclined since childhood and had formed a band while a teenager. She intended to be like her husband and enter the music industry as a headline performer. In a later interview, she explained her motivations: "I wasn't following on the success of Krisdayanti dan Anang, a husband and wife who had made an album together. I just started when I did. Dhani only gave me the time then, as our children were getting older and I could focus on my music." (Note: Original: "Aku nggak mengekor kesuksesan Krisdayanti dan Anang yang suami istri sama-sama bikin album. Kebetulan aku baru mulai sekarang. Dhani memang baru memberi aku waktu saat ini, dimana anak-anak sudah besar dan aku bisa merintis karier di musik.") With Dhani's guidance, in 1999 Maia decided to form a duo consisting of a singer and a musician, with the name Ratu. The concept was based on that of international bands like Roxette and Savage Garden. Maia set herself as a keyboardist, then began to look for a vocalist.

Pinkan Mambo, who at the time sang at a café, was working towards a career as a professional musician. In mid-1999, she met Dhani at a café in Pondok Indah Mall, South Jakarta. She introduced herself to him, saying that she had a good voice. When Dhani asked how good, she replied "Amazing. [...] as good as Mariah Carey." (Note: Original: "Bagus. [...] sebagus Mariah Carey.") Mambo then received Dhani's number, which she used to call him repeatedly and ask for an album. On the fifth day, Maia answered the phone and eventually offered Mambo the position of vocalist with Ratu. Although Mambo wanted to be a soloist, she accepted and had an audition at Maia's home, where she was accepted before she could finish singing. Before she began work with Ratu, Pinkan was given training as a backing vocalist for Dewa 19.

After three years of preparation, in January 2003 Ratu launched their debut album Bersama with Sony Music Indonesia. The album included ten songs, seven written by Maia and three by Dhani; Maia also did the arrangement and served as backing vocalist. Other musicians involved on the album included Bintang (bass), Denny Chasmala, Andra Ramadhan and Taras (guitar), Agil Cinere (drums), Donni (flute), Sa'unine (strings) and Henry Lamiri (violin). The music was R&B-influenced, with added piano for a "feminine touch." (Note: Original: "... unsur feminin.") With the album several singles, "Aku Baik-Baik Saja" ("I'm Fine"), "Salahkah Aku Terlalu Mencintaimu" ("Blame Me For Loving You Too Much") and "Jangan Bilang Siapa Siapa" ("Don't Tell Anyone"), were released. This first album was well-received and sold more than 250,000 copies. Ratu also provided a new sound, as the Indonesian music industry of the time was dominated by male groups. Ratu won Best Newcomer at the 2003 Clear Top Ten Awards. At the 2006 MTV Ampuh awards, Ratu was awarded Artist of the Year and Group/Duo Artist of The Year.

After the success of Bersama, Maia and Mambo began to work on a second album, scheduled for a 2004 release. However, on 14 October 2004 Mambo announced she was leaving the group amidst widespread media coverage of her being pregnant outside of wedlock. Reports indicated that she may have left the group because of Maia's more dominant personality and conflicts between the two. Maia, left as the only member of the band, insisted that it was not dissolving, and would soon hold auditions for a new vocalist. As a temporary measure, several singers were contracted to perform with Maia, although not signed as members. Tia, a finalist in Akademi Fantasi Indosiar (AFI), came under consideration for the position, but was unable to accept as she was still contracted to AFI.

=== Line-up change and success ===
"Teman Tapi Mesra" (2005)
"Teman Tapi Mesra" was Ratu's most successful single. It was later bought by the Swiss band LadyLike and recorded in English as "Dreaming of the Time" in 2009.

While looking for a new vocalist, Maia met Mulan Kwok, a performer at Barbados Cafe in Bilangan Kemang, Jakarta, in December 2004. Of this meeting, Maia later recalled "When I met Mulan it was like meeting a new lover. I saw her and I liked her. Just fell in love." (Note: Original: "Ketika bertemu Mulan saya seperti bertemu pacar baru. Begitu melihat langsung suka. Langsung jatuh cinta.") Mulan was a café singer from Bandung who sang with Dimensi Band. She was asked to audition for the role and ultimately selected; her appointment was announced at a press conference on 7 April 2005. With Mulan, the group's concept, originally "elegant", became "coquettish and sexy". (Note: Original: "... centil dan seksi.") The group's musical style also changed; while originally R&B with light piano, it was changed to a rock sound with dominant guitars.

Ratu's logo, as seen on Ratu & Friends

On 30 August 2005 Ratu released a compilation album entitled Ratu & Friends which included two new songs from the group, "Teman Tapi Mesra" ("Friends With Benefits") and a cover of Vina Panduwinata's "Di Dadaku Ada Kamu" ("In My Chest there is You"). "Teman Tapi Mesra" was an overnight hit in Indonesia, Malaysia, and Singapore and enjoyed by both adults and children alike. The term "Teman Tapi Mesra", often abbreviated TTM, became widely used to describe those in a physical relationship without an emotional one. The ringback tone for "Teman Tapi Mesra" held the top position in Malaysia for several weeks. In Indonesia, the ringback tone saw more than a million downloads. The album sold more than 400,000 copies and was certified double platinum. Ratu then put on a forty-city concert tour throughout Indonesia with the band Radja; the Rock in Love tour began with a concert at the Jakarta Convention Center on 20 February 2006.

On 22 May 2006 Ratu released their second studio album, No. Satu (Number One). Like on Bersama, most of the songs recorded were written by Maia. Dhani contributed three songs, while Mulan helped write the song "Seribu Cinta" ("A Thousand Loves"). No. Satu also involved musicians such as Yoyo Padi, Denny Chasmala, Tepi Item, and Bintang. Two singles from the album, "Lelaki Buaya Darat" ("Womanizer") and "Dear Diary", were hits, as was the album; it sold 200,000 copies on the day of its release, a record for a work by a female Indonesian group. "Lelaki Buaya Darat" was banned in Malaysia because of its perceived negative connotations. The band tried to change the song's title, but this was unsuccessful. However, some radio stations in Malaysia still played the song.

Throughout 2005 and 2006 Ratu was one of Indonesia's dominant bands and often used in product advertisements. Both members explored different aspects of show business. Maia acted in Extravaganza, a comedy show on Trans TV, while Mulan starred in several television films. The band's clothing, inspired by the Harajuku fashion district in Japan, made teenagers interested in street clothing. The band also received widespread coverage in infotainment media, with much gossip about Dhani's relationship with Mulan. Noting the role that infotainment media had played in the band's success, Maia said "Ratu should give thanks to all those reporters who gave us fame with their gossip." (Note: Original: "Ratu patut berterima kasih kepada wartawan yang telah mengangkat Ratu dengan gosip.")

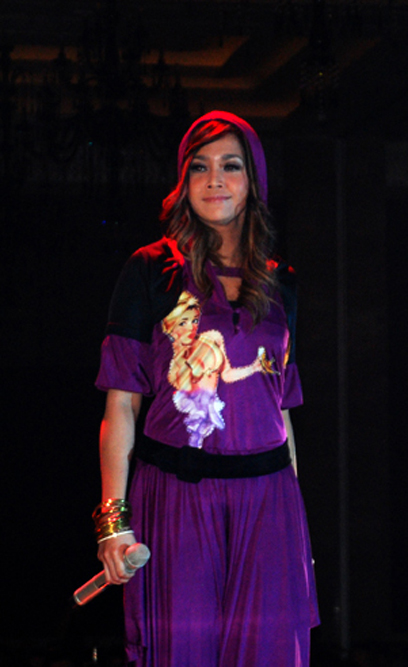
Maia formed a new musical group based on her own name, Duo Maia, after Ratu dissolved.

Ratu received numerous awards during this period. At the tenth Anugerah Musik Indonesia, the band received three nominations and won Best Produced Work for "Teman Tapi Mesra". Maia and Mulan were also awarded Top Singer at the SCTV Awards, winning over established stars Agnes Monica, Ari Lasso, Iwan Fals, dan Krisdayanti. Ada the MTV Indonesia Awards, they were nominated in two categories. At the MTV Ampuh Awards, Ratu was declared Artist of the Year and "Group/Duo Artist of The Year", making them the first group to win both awards twice.

=== Dissolution ===
At the end of 2006, Ahmad Dhani threatened to disband the group if Maia did not cut back on her performance schedule; he felt she was too busy, to the point of forgetting their children. Dhani later withdrew his threat, but – after becoming manager – limited the group to one performance a week. He then fired the group's manager, Vita Ramona, who threatened to bring Dhani to court if he did not apologize for perceived defamation. This situation was exacerbated when Mulan publicly complained of not receiving her share of the band's money and a lack of transparency in the management. She resigned on 30 January 2007, after waiting ten days for her open letter to the management to receive a reply. Mulan then hired a lawyer and sued Dhani, resulting in her contract fee being returned.

After Mulan left, Maia continued to perform as Ratu own her own. She participated in the concert tour A Mild Live Soundrenaline with Shanty, Bunga Citra Lestari, and Ghea—a winner of Indonesian Idol. Later domestic troubles between Dhani and Maia led to the group to dissolve. At the end of 2007, the group's name became an object of contention between the two. Dhani claimed the name "Ratu" as his intellectual right and said that he had registered it with the General Directorate of Intellectual Rights. He forbid Maia, who was then looking for a new partner, to use the name.

== Later activities ==
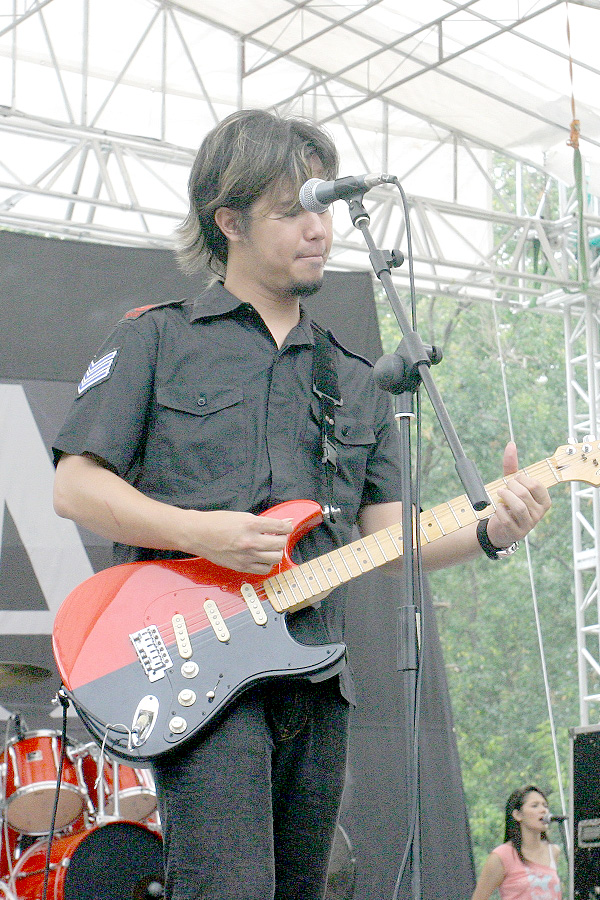
Dhani continued to work with girl groups after Ratu.

At the beginning of 2008, Maia launched Duo Maia with her new partner Mey Chan. Unlike Ratu, Duo Maia was conceived as a vocal group and Maia was predominantly a vocalist. Meanwhile, Mulan signed with Republik Cinta Management under Ahmad Dhani. Mulan released a solo album entitled Makhluk Tuhan Paling Seksi (God's Sexiest Creature) in 2008 and changed her stage name to Mulan Jameela. Mambo, the Ratu's original vocalist, had already released a solo album, entitled Aku Tahu Rasanya (I Know How It Feels) in 2006. In 2009, "Teman Tapi Mesra" was bought by LadyLike, a Swedish girl band, and released in the European market as the English-language "Dreaming of the Time".

Ratu was followed by numerous Indonesian duos attempting to follow in its success. Towards the end of the 2000s, Ahmad Dhani did so as well, coaching the duos MahaDewi and The Virgin. None of these groups were as successful as Ratu, and, by 2011, Korean-inspired boy and girl bands had become dominant. Maia later said that Ratu had been successful because it was the only one of its kind, that "there were benefits to being a pioneer". (Note: Original: "... ada untungnya menjadi pionir.")

== Discography ==
=== Studio albums ===
Title	Album details	Certifications	Sales
Bersama Together	Released: 21 January 2003; Label: Sony Music Indonesia, Columbia Records; Formats: CD, cassette	Silver	250,000
No. Satu Number One	Released: 22 May 2006; Label: Sony BMG Indonesia, Columbia Records; Formats: CD, cassette	Silver	200,000

=== Compilation albums ===
Title	Album details	Certifications	Sales
Ratu & Friends	Released: 30 August 2005; Label: Sony BMG Indonesia, Columbia Records; Formats: CD, cassette	2x Platinum	400,000

=== Singles ===
Title	Year	Album
"Aku Baik-Baik Saja" "I'm Fine"	2003	Bersama
"Salahkah Aku Terlalu Mencintaimu" "Blame Me for Loving You Too Much"	2003	Bersama
"Jangan Bilang Siapa-Siapa" "Don't Tell Anyone"	2003	Bersama
"Teman Tapi Mesra" "Friends With Benefits"	2005	Ratu & Friends
"Di Dadaku Ada Kamu" "In My Chest There is You"	2005	Ratu & Friends
"Lelaki Buaya Darat" "Womanizer"	2006	No. Satu
"Dear Diary"	2006	No. Satu

== Concert tours ==
- Rock in Love (2005–2006)
- A Mild Live Soundrenaline (2007)

== Awards ==
Year	Award	Category	Work	Result
2003	Anugerah Musik Indonesia	Best Newcomers		Nominated
2003	Anugerah Musik Indonesia	Best Producer		Nominated
2003	Clear Top Ten Awards	Best Newcomer		Won
2003	MTV Ampuh	Artist of the Year		Won
2003	MTV Ampuh	Group/Duo Artist of The Year		Won
2006	Anugerah Musik Indonesia	Best Album	No. Satu	Nominated
2006	Anugerah Musik Indonesia	Best Duo/Collaboration/Group		Nominated
2006	Anugerah Musik Indonesia	Best Produced Work	"Teman Tapi Mesra"	Won
2006	SCTV Awards	Top Singer		Won
2006	SCTV Music Awards	Top Singer/Group		Nominated
2006	SCTV Music Awards	Best Video Clip	"Teman Tapi Mesra"	Nominated
2006	MTV Ampuh	Artist of the Year		Won
2006	MTV Ampuh	Group/Duo Artist of The Year		Won
2006	MTV Indonesia Awards	Most Favorite Group/Band/Duo		Nominated
2006	MTV Indonesia Awards	Video of the Year	"Lelaki Buaya Darat"	Nominated
2007	SCTV Music Awards	Top Singer/Group		Nominated
2007	SCTV Music Awards	Top Video Clip	"Lelaki Buaya Darat"	Nominated
