= No. Satu =

Studio album by Ratu
- Released: 22 May 2006
- Recorded: 2005–2006
- Genre: Pop, R&B, rock
- Length: 45:35
- Label: Sony BMG Indonesia, Epic Records
- Producer: Maia Estianty

Ratu chronology
Ratu & Friends (2005)	No. Satu (2006)

Singles from No. Satu
- 1. "Lelaki Buaya Darat" Released: 6 April 2006; 2. "Dear Diary" Released: 10 August 2006

No. Satu (Number One) is the second and final studio album by Indonesian pop band, Ratu. Released on 22 May 2006 by Sony BMG Indonesia, it is their last album with lead singer, Mulan Kwok and also the last album the band released prior to their dissolution in 2007.

== Background ==
Following the success of their debut album Bersama (2003), Ratu began recording a new material for their second album, originally scheduled for a 2004 release. However, its original lead singer, Pinkan Mambo decided to leave the band in October 2004. As the band finally chose Mulan Kwok as the new vocalist, they released Ratu & Friends beforehand in 2005, before resume working on their second album.

Like their first album, most of the songs in the album were written by Maia. Dhani composed and wrote three songs, while Mulan helped write the song "Seribu Cinta" ("A Thousand Loves"). No. Satu also involved musicians such as Yoyo Padi, Denny Chasmala, Tepi Item, and Bintang.

No. Satu was released on 22 May 2006. "Lelaki Buaya Darat" ("Womanizer" (Note: The term literally means "Man who is like a Crocodile on the Land".)) and "Dear Diary" were released as singles and later made into music videos. The album was sold more than 200,000 copies upon its release, a record for a work by a female Indonesian music group. "Lelaki Buaya Darat" was banned in Malaysia due to its perceived negative connotations. The band tried to change the song's title, but this was unsuccessful. However, some radio stations in Malaysia still played the song. The album would be the last to be recorded and released by Ratu before they disbanded a year later.

== Track listing ==
No.	Title	Writer(s)	Length
1.	"Lelaki Buaya Darat" ("Womanizer")	Maia Estianty	3:29
2.	"Semakin Hari Semakin Cinta" ("More and More in Love Day by Day")	Ahmad Dhani	5:06
3.	"Dear Diary"	Maia Estianty	3:57
4.	"Seribu Cinta" ("A Thousand Loves")	Maia Estianty; Mulan Kwok	4:02
5.	"Teman Tapi Mesra" ("Friends With Benefits")	Maia Estianty	4:24
6.	"Lelaki Yang Kumau (Jazz Up Your Life)" ("The Man That I Want (Jazz Up Your Life)")	Ahmad Dhani	3:42
7.	"Ratu Sejagad" ("Queen of the Globe")	Dani Mamesah	4:06
8.	"No. Satu" ("Number One")	Ahmad Dhani	3:11
9.	"Di Dadaku Ada Kamu" ("In My Chest There is You")	Dodo Zakaria	4:17
10.	"Aku Pasti Kembali" ("I'm Surely Come Back")	Maia Estianty	4:31
11.	"Teman Tapi Mesra (Akustik)" ("Friends With Benefits (Acoustic)")	Maia Estianty	4:43
Total length:			45:35

== Works cited ==
- "Album Kedua Ratu, Lebih Ngerock!" [Ratu's Second Album, Rocking More!] (in Indonesian). Tembang.com. Archived from the original on 3 June 2004.
- Asmoro, Widi (2006). "Ratu – No. Satu". Sony BMG Music Entertainment.
- "Pinkan Mambo Undur Diri dari Ratu" [Pinkan Mambo Resigns From Ratu] (in Indonesian). KapanLagi.com. 15 October 2004. Archived from the original on 11 August 2016.
- "No. Satu: Aih, Ratu Nemu Aja Gelinjang Barunya..." [No. Satu: Ah, Ratu Has Found Its New Sound...] (in Indonesian). Tembang.com.
- "Ratu, Jadi No. Satu di Album Baru" [Ratu, Becomes Number One on Their New Album] (in Indonesian). Tembang.com.
- "Ratu: Binatang Lelaki Ratu" [Ratu: Ratu's Man Beast]. Gatra (in Indonesian). 4 June 2006. Archived from the original on 9 August 2016.
- "Maia Ahmad: Vokalis Ratu Maia" [Maia Ahmad: The Vocalist of Ratu is Maia]. Gatra (in Indonesian). 12 July 2007. Archived from the original on 24 May 2012.
- No. Satu [Number One] (Media notes) (in Indonesian). Ratu. Sony BMG Indonesia. 2006.
