= Teman Tapi Mesra =

Single by Ratu

from the album Ratu & Friends and No. Satu
- Released: 15 July 2005
- Recorded: 22 December 2004
- Genre: Pop
- Length: 4:24
- Label: Sony BMG Indonesia
- Songwriter: Maia Estianty
- Producer: Ahmad Dhani

Ratu singles chronology
| "Jangan Bilang Siapa Siapa" (2003) | "Teman Tapi Mesra" (2005) | "Di Dadaku Ada Kamu" (2005) |

Audio sample
- file; help

"Teman Tapi Mesra" (English: "Friends With Benefits") is a song by Indonesian pop band, Ratu. It was released in 2005 as the lead single from their compilation album, Ratu & Friends and later included in their second studio album, No. Satu (2006). The song was written by Maia Estianty and produced by her then-husband Ahmad Dhani. A music video was filmed to promote the single.

== Production ==
"Teman Tapi Mesra" was written by Maia Estianty, who is also provided backing vocals, with her then-husband Ahmad Dhani serves as the producer. It is one of the two new songs included in Ratu's debut compilation album, Ratu & Friends, the other being "Di Dadaku Ada Kamu", originally performed by Vina Panduwinata.

== Themes ==
According to Ratu, the term "Teman Tapi Mesra", often abbreviated as TTM, became widely used to describe those in a physical relationship without an emotional one. It has also later became common terms in Indonesian vocabulary.

== Reception ==
Upon its release, "Teman Tapi Mesra" was well-received and became an overnight hit in Malaysia, Singapore and the band's native Indonesia, enjoyed by both adults and children alike. The ringback tone for "Teman Tapi Mesra" held the top position in Malaysia for several weeks. In Indonesia, the ringback tone saw more than a million downloads. "Teman Tapi Mesra" and its acoustic version was then included in Ratu's second album, No. Satu (2006).

At the 2006 Anugerah Musik Indonesia, "Teman Tapi Mesra" won the Best Produced Work category, while at the 2006 SCTV Music Awards, the song were nominated for the Best Video Clip.

=== Ladylike version ===
In 2009, now-defunct Swedish girl group Ladylike re-recorded the song in English as "Dreaming of the Time" for their self-titled debut and final studio album. The English version of "Teman Tapi Mesra" still credited Maia Estianty as the original composer and lyricist.

== Track listings ==
| No. | Title | Length |
|---|---|---|
| 1. | "Teman Tapi Mesra" (Original version) | 4:24 |
| 2. | "Teman Tapi Mesra" (Acoustic version) | 4:43 |
| Total length: | | 9:08 |

== Works cited ==
- "Ratu & Friends: Album Yang 'Menipu'" [Ratu & Friends: An Album that 'Deceives'] (in Indonesian). Tembang.com.
- "Dari TTM, Ganti Pasangan, sampai Threesome" [From Friends with Benefits, Swingers, to Threesomes]. Suara Merdeka (in Indonesian). 1 March 2006. Archived from the original on 4 March 2016.
- Putranto, Wendi (2009). Rolling Stone Music Biz: Manual Cerdas Menguasai Bisnis Musik [Rolling Stone Music Biz: Smart Guide to Mastering the Music Business]. Jakarta: Mizan Publika. ISBN 978-979-24-3867-3.
- "Lagu TTM Ciptaan Maia Estianty Dibeli Band Bule" [TTM by Maia Estianty Bought By Foreign Band] (in Indonesian). Okezone.com. 18 May 2009. Archived from the original on 24 May 2012.
- "No. Satu: Aih, Ratu Nemu Aja Gelinjang Barunya..." [No. Satu: Ah, Ratu Has Found Its New Sound...] (in Indonesian). Tembang.com.
- Asmoro, Widi (2006). "Ratu – No. Satu". Sony BMG Music Entertainment.
- "AMI Awards 2006, Refresh! Supaya Lebih Bergengsi" [AMI Awards 2006, Refresh! So More Respectable] (in Indonesian). Tembang.com.
- "Anugerah Musik Indonesia (AMI) 2006: Samsons dan Agnes Monica Sabet Berbagai Kategori" [Anugerah Musik Indonesia (AMI) 2006: Samsons and Agnes Monica Take Several Categories]. Gatra (in Indonesian). 21 December 2006. Archived from the original on 4 March 2016.
- Laurentius (19 May 2006). "SCTV Music Awards 2006: Agnes atau Iwan?" [SCTV Music Awards 2006: Agnes or Iwan?]. Suara Karya (in Indonesian). Archived from the original on 13 February 2021.
- Tomy Tresnady (26 October 2017). "Heboh Lagu "Teman Tapi Mesra" Dicover Girlband Swedia" [Swedish Girl Group's Cover Version Of "Teman Tapi Mesra" Become Hit]. Suara.com (in Indonesian).
