= Ratu & Friends =

Compilation album by Ratu
- Released: 30 August 2005
- Recorded: 2005
- Genre: Pop, R&B
- Length: 47:57
- Label: Sony BMG Indonesia
- Producer: Maia Estianty

Ratu chronology
Bersama (2003)	Ratu & Friends (2005)	No. Satu (2006)

Singles from Ratu & Friends
- 1. "Teman Tapi Mesra" Released: 15 July 2005; 2. "Di Dadaku Ada Kamu" Released: 14 December 2005

Ratu & Friends is the compilation album by Indonesian pop band, Ratu. Released on 30 August 2005 by Sony BMG Indonesia, it is their first album with new lead singer, Mulan Kwok.

== Background ==
Ratu & Friends would be the first album Ratu recorded and released with its new lead vocalist, Mulan Jameela, who was then known as Mulan Kwok and is a café singer from Bandung who performed with Dimensi Band, following the departure of the band's original lead singer, Pinkan Mambo in October 2004. For the album, Ratu changed their musical style from R&B with light piano to rock with dominant guitars, while their concept became "coquettish and sexy". (Note: Original: "... centil dan seksi.") Ratu & Friends contains two new songs, "Teman Tapi Mesra" ("Friends With Benefits") and a cover version of Vina Panduwinata's "Di Dadaku Ada Kamu" ("In My Chest There is You"), while the rest are a compilation of songs performed by renowned Indonesian artistes, including Glenn Fredly, Radja and ADA Band.

Ratu & Friends was released on 30 August 2005 and was well-received, selling more than 400,000 copies and was certified double platinum. The album's lead single, "Teman Tapi Mesra" became a major success in Indonesia, Malaysia, and Singapore. The ringback tone for the single held the top position in Malaysia for several weeks, while in the group's native Indonesia, the ringback tone saw more than a million downloads. "Teman Tapi Mesra" was then included in Ratu's second album, No. Satu (2006). The song was later re-recorded in English by Swedish girl group, Ladylike as "Dreaming of the Time" in 2009.

== Track listing ==
No.	Title	Writer(s)	Length
1.	"Teman Tapi Mesra"	Maia Estianty	4:24
2.	"Di Dadaku Ada Kamu"	Dodo Zakaria	4:17
3.	"Akhir Cerita Cinta (Glenn Fredly)"	Glenn Fredly	4:00
4.	"Kau (Ello ft. Glenn Fredly)"	Glenn Fredly	4:58
5.	"Cinderella (Radja)"	Ian Kasela; Ipay	3:32
6.	"Jadikan Aku Raja (ADA Band)"	Krishna Balagita	4:05
7.	"Why Do You Love Me (Erwin Gutawa ft. Rio Febrian)"	Yok Koeswoyo	4:50
8.	"Rahasia Hati (Element)"	Ferdy Tahier	3:11
9.	"Rum Raisin Chocolate Ice Cream (Ten 2 Five)"	Arief Winarto	2:45
10.	"Hanya Dirimu (Dygta ft. Meda)"	Yon Chasman	3:41
11.	"Temani Aku (Sheila on 7)"	Eross Candra	2:56
12.	"Patah (Padi)"	Piyu	5:13
Total length:			47:57

== Works cited ==
- "Bubarnya Ratu, Bubarnya Kekenesan!" [Dissolution of Ratu, Dissolution of Prudery] (in Indonesian). Tembang.com. Archived from the original on 4 February 2013.
- Asmoro, Widi (2006). "Ratu – No. Satu". Sony BMG Music Entertainment. Archived from the original on 16 December 2012.
- Yordenaya, Ine (7 April 2005). "Mulan Vokalis Baru Ratu" [Mulan, the New Vocalist of Ratu] (in Indonesian). DetikHot. Archived from the original on 24 May 2012.
- "Ratu & Friends: Album Yang 'Menipu'" [Ratu & Friends: An Album that 'Deceives'] (in Indonesian). Tembang.com. Archived from the original on 19 September 2012.
- "Di Ratu Versi Baru, Maia Bakal Main Gitar" [In the New Ratu, Maia Even Plays Guitar] (in Indonesian). Tembang.com. Archived from the original on 3 February 2013.
- "Lagu TTM Ciptaan Maia Estianty Dibeli Band Bule" [TTM by Maia Estianty Bought By Foreign Band] (in Indonesian). Okezone.com. 18 May 2009. Archived from the original on 24 May 2012.
- "Maia Ahmad: Takut Seksi" [Maia Ahmad: Afraid of Being Sexy]. Gatra (in Indonesian). 25 February 2006. Archived from the original on 4 March 2016.
- Putranto, Wendi (2009). Rolling Stone Music Biz: Manual Cerdas Menguasai Bisnis Musik [Rolling Stone Music Biz: Smart Guide to Mastering the Music Business]. Jakarta: Mizan Publika. ISBN 978-979-24-3867-3.
- Ratu & Friends (Media notes) (in Indonesian). Ratu. Sony BMG Indonesia. 2005.
