= Republik Cinta =

Studio album by Dewa 19
- Released: January 2006
- Recorded: 2005
- Genre: Rock / Pop rock
- Length: 46:34
- Label: EMI Indonesia; GP Records
- Producer: Ahmad Dhani

Dewa 19 chronology
Laskar Cinta (2004)	Republik Cinta (2006)	Kerajaan Cinta (2007)

Republik Cinta is the 8th studio album by Dewa 19 and was released in January 2006 in Indonesia; the title translates into "Republic of Love". The album reached #1 on the Indonesian album charts and has since been released in other Asian territories including Malaysia and a Chinese release via EMI in Hong Kong.

This was Dewa's first album for EMI Indonesia after parting company with their long-term label Aquarius Musikindo in 2005.

The album spawned four radio hit singles, "Laskar Cinta", "Selimut Hati","Larut", and "Sedang Ingin Bercinta". "Laskar Cinta" reached # 1 on almost every mainstream radio station in Indonesia, also featured cover song from Queen "I Want To Break Free". The video clips for all three hits also received heavy rotation on local TV and cable music channels, including MTV Asia.

At the 2006 10th AMI Awards (Indonesian music awards), the album was nominated in the "Best Rock Album" category, in addition to the prestigious "Best of the Best Album".

== Track listing ==
1. "Laskar Cinta - Chapter One" (Love Soldier - Chp. One)
2. "Laskar Cinta - Chapter Two" (Love Soldier - Chp. Two)
3. "Emotional Love Song"
4. "Larut" (Dissolved)
5. "Sedang Ingin Bercinta" (I Want to Make Love)
6. "Perasaanku Tentang Perasaanku Kepadamu" (My Feelings About My Feelings for You)
7. "Lelaki Pecemburu" (Jealous Man)
8. "Lover’s Rhapsody"
9. "I Want to Break Free"
10. "Flower In The Desert"
11. "Live On"
12. "Selimut Hati" (Heart's Blanket)

== Singles ==
- "Laskar Cinta"
- "Selimut Hati"
- "Sedang Ingin Bercinta"
- "Larut"

== Charts ==
Chart (2006)	Peak position
Indonesia Album Charts	1
