= Pinkan Mambo =

Indonesian singer

- Born: Pinkan Ratnasari Mambo; 11 November 1980 (age 45); Jakarta, Indonesia
- Citizenship: Indonesian
- Occupations: Singer; Songwriter; Actress
- Years active: 1999 - present
- Spouses: Mayzal Reza Tobroni (m. 2004; div. 2004); Sandy Sanjaya (m. 2005; div. 2009); Steve Wantania (m. 2013; div. 2022); Arya Khan (m. 2023)
- Children: 5
- Parents: Deetje Ketua Syariff Iwanas; Youke F. Mambo
- Musical career
- Genres: Disco; Pop; R&B
- Instrument: Voice
- Label: Sony BMG Music Entertainment

Pinkan Ratnasari Mambo (born 11 November 1980), also known as Pinkan Mambo, is an Indonesian actress and singer-songwriter. She achieved success as the vocalist in the Indonesian music duo Ratu between 2000 and 2004, then continued her career as a soloist.

Born and raised in Jakarta, Mambo began singing at an early age but only began to sing in public as a teenager. While still in senior high school, she found a job as a café singer and performed in numerous venues throughout Jakarta. In 2000, she joined songwriter and music producer Maia Estianty as part of Ratu after she met Estianty's husband Ahmad Dhani, the singer for the band Dewa 19; after six casting calls, Dhani invited her to join the band, which he had established for his wife, and let her manage. The duo was successful, but because of conflict between the two members and Mambo's unintended pregnancy, she left the group. She then began a solo career with Sony BMG, releasing three solo albums as of 2012. She also acted in one film, Selimut Berdarah, in 2010.

Onstage Mambo is known as an energetic performer who often includes her audience in her act. She generally collaborates with other artists, working with local bands when she performs and has other people write her songs. The mother of fourth children, as of 2013, she's married to music-video director Steve Wantania.

== Early life ==
Mambo was born in Jakarta on 11 November 1980 to Yoke F. Mambo and his wife Deetje Syarif. She was the eldest, and only girl, of three children born to the couple. When she was five years old, her parents divorced. Not long afterwards, Mambo was sent to live with her grandmother because her mother, who received custody, could not afford to send Mambo to school. The two boys stayed with their mother.

Life with her grandmother was strict and, as Mambo felt depressed without her father, she became withdrawn, sticking to a daily routine of prayers and studying. However, she performed well at school, ranking amongst the top five in her class at Yapenka Elementary School in South Jakarta. She later became more outgoing and was known among her family and friends as a very feminine child, enjoying dresses and make-up. While in elementary school she began singing along with songs by her favourite singers Mariah Carey and Whitney Houston in her bedroom. Her mother, believing that Mambo had the ability to be a professional singer, convinced Mambo to try and sing in public while the latter was still in junior high school.

Mambo began her studies at Cendrawasih Senior High School in Cilandak, South Jakarta, in 1997. In 1998, while visiting a friend at Amigos Café, where she worked, Mambo was asked to sing and later booked as a singer at the café; her mother supported the decision. Mambo held the job while continuing her studies. She changed venues often, telling the entertainment magazine Tabloid Nova that within a year she had sung at almost every café in the city.

== Ratu ==
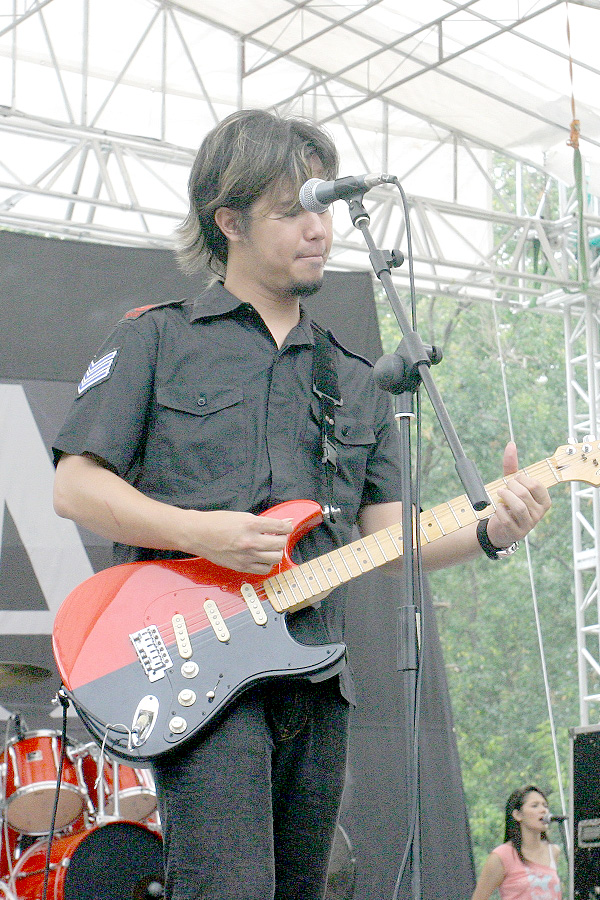
Mambo called Ahmad Dhani numerous times at all hours of the day before he signed her to sing for Ratu.

In 1999 Maia Estianty and her husband Ahmad Dhani established a musical duo consisting of a singer and musician, based on concepts pioneered by international bands such as Roxette and Savage Garden. They began looking for a singer. Mambo convinced Dhani to hire her by calling "at all hours of the day" (Note: Original: "... tidak kenal waktu") after meeting him while at a café in Pondok Indah Mall in South Jakarta; she had chosen to seek out Dhani because of his previous experience with new singers, including Reza Artamevi, and had heard that he frequented the mall. After her sixth audition for the band, named Ratu, meaning Queen, she was chosen to be its vocalist. Although Mambo begun studying economics at Trisakti University, owing to the pressures of her contract she dropped out.

After three years of training, during which time Mambo joined Dhani's band Dewa 19 as a backing singer, Ratu released its first album, Bersama (Together), in 2003. It had a rhythm and blues (R&B) flavour and featured Mambo on vocals and Estianty on instruments. The album was a commercial success, selling 250,000 copies. With her portion of the proceeds, Mambo paid for both of her brothers to attend university and bought a car.

Although Mambo and Estianty began work on another album, Mambo withdrew from the group in 2004 after widespread reports that she was pregnant and unmarried; Mambo said that she had been fired by Estianty, although she admitted that her pregnancy had been a factor. She was officially replaced on 7 April 2005 by Mulan Jameela, a café singer from Bandung who took the stage name Mulan Kwok.

== Solo career ==
Mambo had long nurtured a desire to become a solo singer. After she left Ratu, she was signed by Sony BMG for six solo albums. Distancing herself from her former band, she found inspiration for her first album from a doll named she saw in a magazine. Considering herself as coquettish and pampered as the doll, she decided to base her album on the concept. Her debut solo album, Aku Tahu Rasanya (I Know How It Feels) and its singles "Kasmaran" ("Passion"), "Aku Tahu Rasanya", and "Dirimu Dirinya" ("You and He"), a mix of pop and R&B, were successful. That year she recorded tracks for the compilation albums Portrait of Yovie Widianto and Best Female Idol.

Mambo began drifting toward a rock sound. She moved away from her on-stage overly feminine persona, her previous "girly" look and her known affection for the colour pink, and marketed herself as a sexy, sensual singer. She released her second album, Wanita Terindah (The Most Beautiful Woman), on 2 July 2008.

Mambo acted in the 2010 film Selimut Berdarah (The Bloody Blanket), playing a young woman who unknowingly sends her younger sister to an organ harvesting ring. Despite the film's lack of success, Mambo received numerous acting offers, which she refused. Also in 2010 she recorded "Kau Tercipta Untukku" ("You Were Made For Me") for The Masterpiece of Rinto Harahap, a tribute album to songwriter Rinto Harahap. On 30 November 2011 she released her third solo album, Tentang Cinta (About Love).

== Music style ==
Mambo does not write her own songs; rather she uses the works of numerous Indonesian songwriters, including Melly Goeslaw and Glenn Fredly. Since leaving Ratu, Mambo has successfully distanced herself from her coquettish, ultra-feminine look. Her on-stage performance is characterised as very "energetic"; (Note: Origina: "... enerjik ...") she dances and mingles with the audience off stage, and invites them to sing with her on stage. She often performs at clubs, using local bands for the music.

== Personal life ==
Mambo's 2004 pregnancy led to her cancelling her wedding to Meiza Reza Tobroni, as the father of her unborn child was another man. Mambo who at that time still embraced the religion of Islam, gave birth to a boy, Alfa Rezel, on 28 January 2005. That year Mambo's cousin introduced her to a classmate named Sandy Sanjaya. Mambo and Sanjaya, after three months dating, agreed to be married. On 17 April 2006 they had a daughter, named Michele Ashley Rezya.

She and Sanjaya divorced on 14 October 2009, after having been separated for several months; towards the end of their relationship, Sanjaya spent more time in Bali than in the couple's home in Jakarta. Mambo was romantically involved with the association football player Febrianto Wijaya, and they considered marrying. The relationship, however, fell through, and in 2013 Mambo who has converted to Evangelist with her two children married Steve Wantania, a music-video maker in the United States. The couple have two daughters Queen Chara born on June 17, 2015, Queen Abby born on September 1, 2018 and a son King Luke born on August 17, 2017.

== Discography ==
- Bersama (Together; 2003, with Ratu)
- Aku Tahu Rasanya (I Know How It Feels; 2006)
- Wanita Terindah (The Most Beautiful Woman; 2008)
- Tentang Cinta (About Love; 2011)

== Filmography ==
- Selimut Berdarah (The Bloody Blanket; 2010)
- Horas Amang: Tiga Bulan untuk Selamanya (Horas Amang: Three months forever; 2019)

== Awards ==
Year	Award	Category	Work	Result
2003	Anugerah Musik Indonesia	Best Newcomers (with Ratu)		Nominated
2003	Anugerah Musik Indonesia	Best Producer (with Ratu)		Nominated
2003	Clear Top Ten Awards	Best Newcomer (with Ratu)		Won
2003	MTV Ampuh	Artist of the Year (with Ratu)		Won
2003	MTV Ampuh	Group/Duo Artist of The Year (with Ratu)		Won
