= Ahmad Band =

Indonesian music group

- Origin: Jakarta, Indonesia
- Genres: Grunge, hard rock, alternative rock, pop rock
- Years active: 1998–1999, 2022–present (reunion concerts)
- Label: Aquarius Musikindo
- Members: Ahmad Dhani; Andra Ramadhan; Stephan Santoso; Thomas Ramdhan; Yoyo Prasetyo; Ikmal Tobing
- Past members: Pay Burman; Bongky Marcel; Bimo Sulaksono; Jaya Roxx; Tony Monot; Tyo Nugros

Ahmad Band is an Indonesian rock supergroup formed by Ahmad Dhani in 1998. Initially meant to be Dhani's solo album project, he formed the band since he did not like to be known as a solo singer. The band released one album, Ideologi Sikap Otak, in 1998 and are best remembered for the hit songs "Distorsi" and "Aku Cinta Kau dan Dia". Inactive since 1999, the band reunited in 2021 with Ahmad Dhani and Andra Ramadhan as the original members (also the remaining original members of Dewa 19), among with others.

The formation in 2021 includes Ahmad Dhani (from Dewa 19) and Andra Ramadhan (from Dewa 19) as the original members, as well as Thomas Ramdhan (from Gigi), Yoyo Prasetyo (from Padi and Musikima), Stephan Santoso (from Musikimia), and Ikmal Tobing (from T.R.I.A.D., and Mahadewa) as the new members. Past members in 1998-1999 era include Pay Burman (from BIP, ex-Slank), Bongky Marcel (The Flowers, ex Slank) and Bimo Sulaksono (ex-Netral, ex-Dewa 19).

== History ==
=== 1998: Formation ===
Having achieved mainstream success in 1998, Ahmad Dhani feels that Dewa 19's songs are only about love and relationships. Following Indonesian Revolution in the same year, Dhani needed to express himself in the field of general life and politics, which he has been interested in for a long time. In an interview Dhani said "I really wanted to make social criticism songs with good music. Previously, social criticism songs did not have sophisticated music". Did not want to be known as a solo singer, then Dhani recruited Andra Ramadhan (his guitarist in Dewa 19), and Bongky Marcel, Pay Burman (who just left Slank) which he met earlier in a studio. Bimo (the drummer of Netral at that time) was recruited also, since Dhani like this drumming style.

1998–1999: Ideologi Sikap Otak

Differs from his songwriting style in Dewa 19 where he use keyboard as his main instrument, Dhani use composed the songs in guitar, resulting in different chord progressions. Ahmad Band then released Ideologi Sikap Otak, their only album to date, which known for songs such as "Distorsi" and "Aku Cinta Kau dan Dia". The album is currently deleted in physical format. Compared to some of Dewa's million selling album releases, the Ahmad Band project was only moderately successful.

1999–2021: Inactivity and other projects

The band remains inactive since 1999, where Dhani and Andra found even bigger success in Dewa 19's new formation (notably with Once as their new vocalist, and Tyo Nugros recruited into Dewa 19) through the album releases of "Bintang Lima" in 2000, "Cintailah Cinta" in 2002, "Laskar Cinta" in 2004, and "Republik Cinta" in 2006. Andra also found success in his solo project "Andra and the Backbone" with Stevie Item (also known as the member of Deadsquad). Even during the hiatus of Dewa 19, Dhani also formed other groups such as "T.R.I.A.D", "Mahadewa", "The Rock", and become one of the judge for Indonesian Idol and X Factor Indonesia, leaving Ahmad Band out of the equation.

2021–present: Reunion

Dhani announced the reunion of Ahmad Band through an Instagram post he made in January 2021. However Dhani used quotation marks in the "reunion", since it will be only Dhani and Andra as the original members will be present in the reunion. Other members present in the reunion are known musicians such as Thomas Ramdhan (from Gigi), Yoyo Prasetyo (from Padi and Musikima), Stephan Santoso (from Musikimia), and Ikmal Tobing (from T.R.I.A.D., and Mahadewa).

== Discography ==
- Ideologi Sikap Otak (1998)

== Members ==
Current members

- Ahmad Dhani - lead vocals, keyboard (1998–1999, 2021–present)
- Andra Ramadhan - lead guitars (1998–1999, 2021–present)
- Thomas Ramdhan - bass (2021–present)
- Stephan Santoso - guitars (2021–present)
- Yoyo Prasetyo - drums (2021–present)
- Ikmal Tobing - drums (2022–present)

Former members

- Pay Burman – guitar (1998)
- Bongky Marcel – bass (1998)
- Bimo Sulaksono – drum (1998–1999)
- Jaya Roxx – guitar (1998–1999)
- Tony Monot – bass (1999)
- Tyo Nugros – drum (1999)
