= Bersama (Ratu album) =

Studio album by Ratu
- Released: 21 January 2003
- Recorded: 2001–2002
- Genres: Pop, R&B
- Length: 48:58
- Labels: Sony Music Indonesia, Columbia Records
- Producer: Maia Estianty

Ratu chronology
Bersama (2003)	Ratu & Friends (2005)

Singles from Bersama
- 1. "Aku Baik-Baik Saja" Released: September 12, 2002; 2. "Salahkah Aku Terlalu Mencintaimu" Released: January 24, 2003; 3. "Jangan Bilang Siapa Siapa" Released: May 23, 2003

Bersama (Together) is the debut studio album by Indonesian pop band, Ratu. Released on 21 January 2003 by Sony Music Indonesia, it is their first studio album since their formation in 1999. It is also the only Ratu album to feature its original lead singer, Pinkan Mambo.

== Background ==
In 1999, Maia Estianty formed Ratu with the guidance from her then-husband Ahmad Dhani, with Maia herself serves as its keyboardist. Later, she recruited Pinkan Mambo, who was then a singer at a café in Pondok Indah Mall, South Jakarta, as the lead vocalist. Mambo who was initially wanted to be a solo singer, but later changed her mind and became part of Ratu after passed in an audition at Maia's home. They then began working on what would become Bersama.

On the album, Maia composed seven original songs, while Dhani composed three other, which is a cover version of his three compositions, namely "Kita Tak Sedang Bercinta Lagi" ("We're Not Going to Falling in Love Again"; originally performed by Dewa 19), "Dansa" ("Dance"; originally by Reza Artamevia) and "Baru Jadi" ("Just Made"; originally by Denada). They were joined by musicians who involved in album's recording included Bintang (bass), Denny Chasmala, Andra Ramadhan and Taras (guitar), Agil Cinere (drums), Donni (flute), Sa'unine (strings) and Henry Lamiri (violin). Maia also serves as the backing vocalist and music arranger where it was to be influenced by R&B, with instruments like piano was added for a "feminine touch." (Note: Original: "... unsur feminin.") While majority of the songs in Bersama recorded in Indonesian, Ratu also recorded only one English track in the album, "Turn Me On".

The album was released on 21 January 2003 and was well-received upon its release, selling over 250,000 copies. "Aku Baik-Baik Saja" ("I'm Fine"), "Salahkah Aku Terlalu Mencintaimu" ("Blame Me For Loving You Too Much") and "Jangan Bilang Siapa Siapa" ("Don't Tell Anyone") were released as singles and later received music videos. Bersama would be the first and final album Ratu recorded and released with Mambo before leave the band in October 2004.

== Track listing ==
No.	Title	Writer(s)	Length
1.	"Jangan Bilang Siapa-Siapa" ("Don't Tell Anyone")	Maia Estianty	5:01
2.	"Aku Baik-Baik Saja" ("I'm Fine")	Maia Estianty	4:58
3.	"Salahkah Aku Terlalu Mencintaimu" ("Blame Me For Loving You Too Much")	Maia Estianty	4:40
4.	"Kita Tak Sedang Bercinta Lagi" ("We're Not Going to Falling in Love Again")	Ahmad Dhani	5:06
5.	"Nina Bobo" ("Lullaby")	Maia Estianty	4:27
6.	"Bersama" ("Together")	Maia Estianty	3:55
7.	"Turn Me On"	Maia Estianty	4:31
8.	"Baru Jadi" ("Just Made")	Ahmad Dhani	5:33
9.	"Di Mana Kau Ada" ("Wherever You Are")	Maia Estianty	5:33
10.	"Dansa" ("Dance")	Ahmad Dhani	4:45
Total length:			48:58

== Works cited ==
- Rusmitantri, Telni (27 January 2003). "Duo Ratu, Dhani Dewa, dan Album Bersama" [The Duo Ratu, Dhani of Dewa, and the Album Bersama]. Koran Tempo (in Indonesian).
- Sondang, Ester (21 July 2008). "Pinkan Mambo, Telepon Dhani Tanpa Kenal Waktu" [Pinkan Mambo, Calling Dhani at All Hours]. Tabloid Nova (in Indonesian). Archived from the original on 1 January 2015.
- "Ratu: Satu Nekat, Satunya Ngotot!" [Ratu: One Wanted It, One Muscled Her Way In!] (in Indonesian). Tembang.com.
- "Maia Ahmad, Si Emak yang Trendi" [Maia Ahmad, the Trendy Mother] (in Indonesian). SCTV.
- Asmoro, Widi (2006). "Ratu – No. Satu". Sony BMG Music Entertainment.
- "Pinkan Mambo Undur Diri dari Ratu" [Pinkan Mambo Resigns From Ratu] (in Indonesian). KapanLagi.com. 15 October 2004. Archived from the original on 11 August 2016.
- Bersama [Together] (Media notes) (in Indonesian). Ratu. Sony Music Entertainment Indonesia. 2003.
