= Maia Estianty =

Indonesian singer and television personality (born 1976)

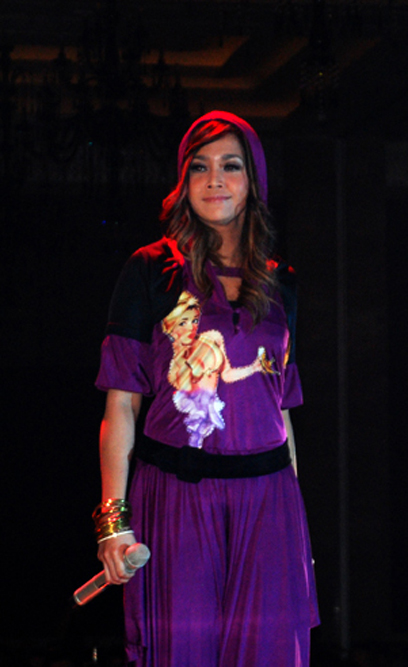
- Born: Maia Estianty; 27 January 1976 (age 50); Surabaya, East Java, Indonesia
- Other name: Bunda Maia Bundadari
- Occupations: Singer; Composer; Businessperson; Record producer; Music executive; Executive producer; Celebrity; competition jury
- Spouses: Ahmad Dhani (m. 1996; div. 2008); Irwan Mussry (m. 2018)
- Musical career
- Genres: Pop rock; R&B; jazz; dance; classic
- Years active: 2003–present
- Label: Sony Music Indonesia; Le Moesiek Revole

Maia Estianty (born 27 January 1976), formerly known as Maia Ahmad during her marriage to fellow musician Ahmad Dhani, is an Indonesian singer, composer, and television personality.

Estianty was born in Surabaya and showed an interest in music at an early age, winning a marching band competition while still in elementary school. She began training as a disc jockey while still in junior high school. After studying at the University of Indonesia, Estianty joined Dewa 19 as a backing vocalist. In 1999, she and Dhani came up with the idea for the musical duo Ratu. Estianty played the music, while other women – first Pinkan Mambo, then Mulan Kwok – sang. Ratu was highly successful. After the dissolution of the band in 2007 and a bitter divorce in September 2008, Estianty formed Duo Maia with Mey Chan. She is currently focusing on producing music with her label, Le Moesik.

== Early life ==
Estianty was born in Surabaya, East Java, on 27 January 1976. She was the fifth of six children born to Harjono Sigit and his wife Kusthini. She is the great-granddaughter of Tjokroaminoto, a nationalist Muslim leader and National Hero, through her father's side.

As a child, Estianty often fought with her classmates; in an interview with the weekly entertainment magazine Tabloid Nova, she recalled that, while at Yohanes Gabriel Catholic Elementary School in Surabaya, she once hit a classmate with an object so hard that the classmate began to bleed profusely. She also took up music during this time, leading her marching band to win a national championship; she also took up the piano.

As a student at State Junior High School 1 in Surabaya, Estianty took up modeling; in 1990 she won the Yess Modelling Competition for Teenagers, which garnered her various offers for modeling. She also began working part-time at a radio station and learned how to be a disc jockey. At a birthday party while in junior high school, a friend introduced her to Ahmad Dhani; Estianty and Dhani began writing songs for the piano together. Having received good marks in elementary school and junior high school, while in senior high school, she began dating, first with a classmate and then with Dhani, which made her student's performance drop drastically.

Towards the end of senior high school, Estianty and her father began arguing about her work and poor performance at school. Estianty threatened to move out; in response, Sigit said he would support her, on the condition that she continue her studies at a state university. Estianty enrolled at the University of Indonesia, first in the Dutch literature programme and later in the communications programme. During this time, she became a backing vocalist for Dhani's band Dewa 19. The two married in the late 1990s.

== Career ==
=== 1999–2007: Ratu ===
In 1999, Estianty and Dhani agreed to establish a musical duo consisting of a singer and musician, based on concepts pioneered by international bands like Roxette and Savage Garden. Pinkan Mambo, a café singer, was chosen to be the second member of the newly formed group, named Ratu, which is "Queen" in Indonesian. After three years of training, Ratu released its first album, Bersama (Together), in 2003, which was influenced by R&B. Maia wrote seven songs on the album, while Dhani did the other three. The album was a commercial success, selling 250,000 copies.

Although Mambo and Estianty began work on another album, Mambo withdrew from the group in 2004 after widespread coverage of her premarital pregnancy. Maia and Dhani began looking for a replacement. They agreed on Mulan Jameela, a café singer from Bandung who took the stage name of Mulan Kwok; her appointment was announced on 7 April 2005. That August, Ratu released the album Ratu and Friends in collaboration with numerous other artists. The album, which featured two songs by Ratu, sold more than 400,000 copies and was certified double platinum in Indonesia. The title of the single "Teman Tapi Mesra", often abbreviated TTM and released to promote Ratu and Friends, became widely used to describe those in a physical relationship without an emotional one.

The following year, Maia garnered a role in the Trans TV-funded comedy programme Extravaganza, where she was the only non-Sundanese cast member. Also in 2006, Ratu released Nomor Satu (Number One), with pop-rock influences; Estianty wrote most of the songs. The album was a commercial success, selling 200,000 copies nationally on the day of its release, a record for a work by a female Indonesian group. However, conflict between Dhani and Estianty, as well as concerns over Jameela's payment, led Ratu to disband in 2007.

=== 2008–present: Duo Maia and acting ===
Estianty with Mey Chan formed Duo Maia. Together, they released the album, Maia and Friends, in 2008, which was in direct competition with Jameela's album. The songs on the album were all written by Estianty. It featured duets with artists such as Gita Gutawa, Gigi, and Glenn Fredly. That year, she was one of ten women honoured at the Tribute to Women ceremony held by the ANTARA News Agency; other honourees included author Ayu Utami and economist Sri Mulyani Indrawati.

Estianty played in Kata Maaf Terakhir (The Last Apology) in 2009 as Dania, the ex-wife to whom Darma (Tio Pakusadewo) must apologise before he dies. Marcel Thee, writing in The Jakarta Globe, described her performance as well done. That same year, she released Sang Juara (The Champion) as part of Duo Maia. In an interview with The Jakarta Post, she explained that she had written the titular song after hearing Queen's power ballad "We Are the Champions" at a basketball match; she realised that there were no Indonesian songs that could be used in the same situation. Along with Dewiq and Agus Wisman, she was a judge of the Global TV sponsored musical talent show Dream Girls, which was open exclusively to mothers.

In early 2010, Estianty established the recording studio Le Moesiek. Several established artists, including Krisdayanti and Julia Perez, signed on quickly. At the time, she owned five other business ventures, including a steakhouse, an outsourcing company, and a café. Estianty was reported in October 2010 to be working on a cover album that featured works originally sung by Nike Ardilla, Hetty Koes Endang, and Atiek CB. Later that year, she was chosen as Ambassador on Domestic Violence by the Indonesian Ministry for Women's Issues. Dhani objected to the appointment and threatened to sue the ministry, as he took offence to suggestions that he had abused Estianty.

In April 2012, Estianty announced that, although Duo Maia would continue to perform, she intended to focus on her work as a producer. She had spent the previous several months focusing on her managerial duties at Le Moesik. Meanwhile, Chan would begin a solo career.

== Personal life ==
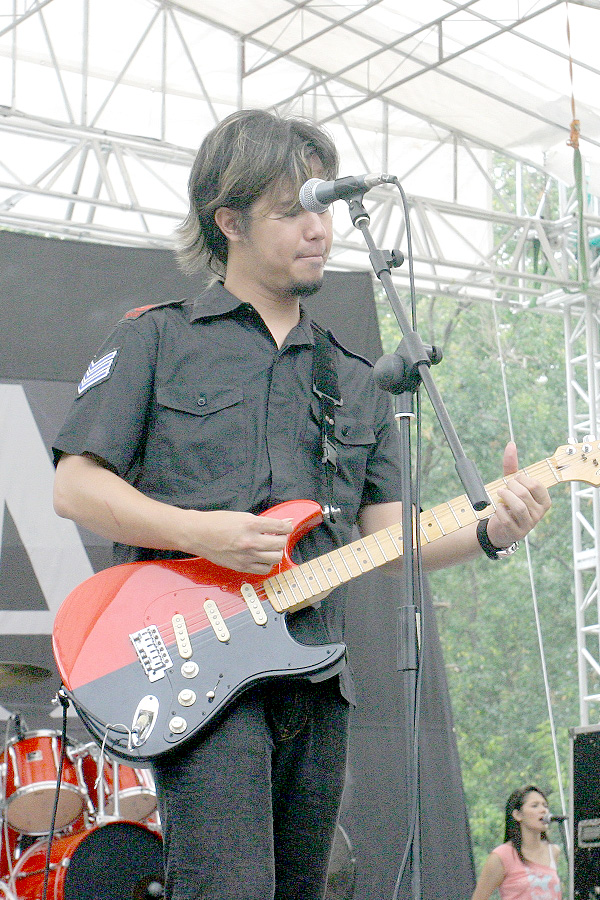
Ahmad Dhani

Estianty and Dhani divorced on 23 September 2008. The separation of the couple, who had been married for twelve years and had three sons; Ahmad Al Ghazali, Ahmad El Jalaluddin Rumi, and Abdul Qodir Jaelani, was not amicable. Estianty filed a police complaint accusing Dhani of abuse, and Dhani refused to give Estianty custody of their children, appealing to the Supreme Court of Indonesia after several lower courts ruled that the children were Estianty's. In 2011, Dhani was reportedly in a relationship with Mulan and had a child with her, and Dhani gave Estianty visitation rights in 2012. Maia submitted an appeal to the Supreme Court because she could not see her children easily. On 14 May 2013, the Supreme Court decided that the children could choose themselves since the children were considered capable of making a decision, to which Dhani agreed. By September 2013, the conflict between Estianty and Dhani had subsided after their youngest son Jaelani was involved on a fatal car accident in Jagorawi highway.

On 29 October 2018, she married businessman Irwan Mussry in Tokyo, Japan.

== Commercials ==
- Honda BeAT (2008)
- Permen Tolak Angin with Duo Maia (2010–2011)
- Ale-Ale bersama Duo Maia (2008–2011)
- Dove (2009)
- Toyota Kijang Innova with Chelsea Rezky (2010)
- Nutrafor White Beauty (2012–2013)
- TVC Telkom Speedy with Al, El, Dul, dan Ahmad Dhani (2012–2013)
- ColaMill with Al and Judika (since 2013)
- Asiafone SF933 with Duo Maia l (since 2013)
- So Klin Higinis Putih
- KOBE: Bumbu Nasi Goreng

== Filmography ==
- Lantai 13 (2007) – Cameo
- Oh My God (2008) – Supporting role
- Kata Maaf Terakhir (2009) – Leading role
- Guru Bangsa: Tjokroaminoto (2015) – Supporting role
