= Once Mekel =

Ellfonda Mekel
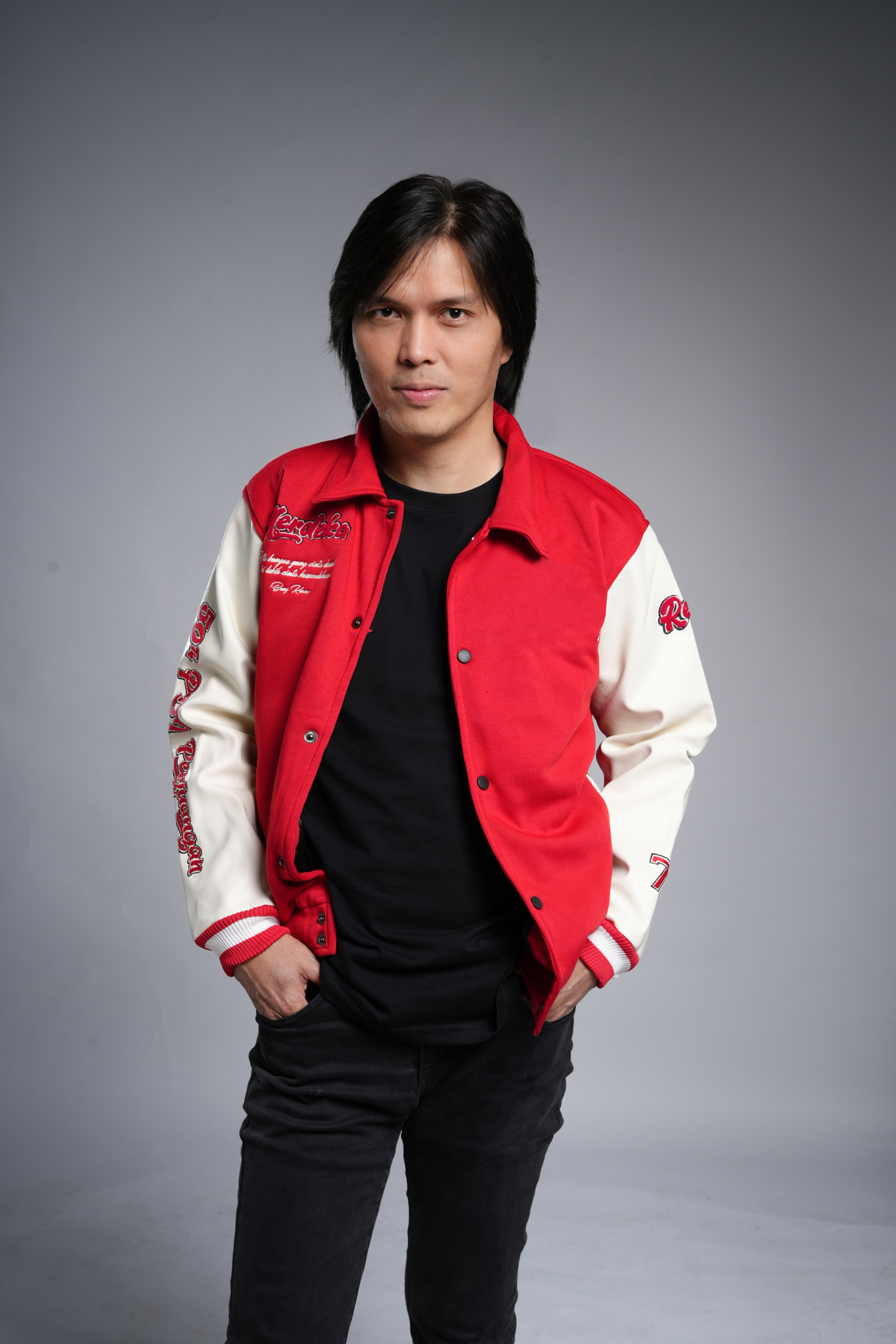

Background information
- Born: Ellfonda Mekel; 21 May 1970 (age 56); Makassar, Indonesia
- Genres: Rock, pop, hard rock, pop rock, soft rock, alternative rock, pop metal
- Occupations: musician, politician, actor
- Years active: 1988–present
- Formerly of: Dewa 19
- Spouse: Rietmadhanty Angelica Tauchid

Elfonda Mekel (born 21 May 1970), better known as Once Mekel ([ˈɔntʃə], pronounced Ohn-chè), is an Indonesian musician, actor and politician. He is renowned as one of the best male vocalists in Indonesia due to his distinctive vocal style and power. Rolling Stone magazine included Once in the "50 Greatest Indonesian Singers".

Once started his career as a singer after completing high school, by becoming a semi-professional singer.

After achieving success as a vocalist, Once was invited to join Dewa 19, which had renamed itself Dewa, replacing Ari Lasso as the lead vocalist after the completion of the Pandawa Lima album (1997) and the single Elang (1999). Before joining the band, he had released solo singles such as "Juwita Pandang" (1991) and "Anggun" (1999).

Joining Dewa, Once played a significant role in the success of two best-selling albums, Bintang Lima (2000) and Cintailah Cinta (2002), with his distinctive vocals. Once produced a total of 5 albums with Dewa as co-lead vocalist with Ahmad Dhani. After his success as a co-lead vocalist with Dewa, Once revived his solo career with the single "Dealova" (2005), which was also the soundtrack for the film of the same name.

Following Dewa's disbandment in 2011 due to his departure, Once focused on his solo singing career. After releasing several singles, he finally launched his debut album titled Once (2012).

== Biography ==
=== Early singing career ===
Once was born in Makassar, the son of Yohanes Elias Mekel and Maria Josephine Mekel Cambey. While in junior high school, Once replaced a vocalist in a festival band, marking his entry into the music world. After high school, Once became a semi-professional vocalist. His band once accompanied famous singers like Ita Purnamasari.

In 1989, Once was accepted as a law student at the University of Indonesia. Despite his studies, he remained dedicated to his musical pursuits. He released the song "Juwita Pandang" on a compilation album in 1991 with Andy Liany Ronald and Pay Burman. He formed the hard rock band 'Fargat 727' and released the album 'Seribu Angan' and also the band 'Java Burns,' which later became 'Bottoms Up' (the precursor to the band 'Getah'). During his college years, Once experienced vocal cord problems, leading him to quit singing and focus on his studies.

He began singing while attending junior high school at Tirta Mart After graduating from Tirta Mirta Senior High School, Once joined numerous bands. His first bands, Brawijaya and Dimensi, were cover bands. After joining Java Burns, he began singing songs he had written himself; he eventually provided a song for the compilation album Seribu Angan (A Thousand Dreams) in the early 1990s.

=== Professional career ===
==== Venturing into Research ====
After completing seven years of study at Universitas Indonesia, in 1996, Once, who was also proficient in piano, drums, and guitar, completed his studies. After earning a law degree, he worked as a legal coordinator at a construction company. Two years later, he joined a research project in collaboration between LIPI and CSIRO. In 1997, amid his busy schedule, Once returned to singing in cafes after his vocal cords healed, although with a different voice (he had retired from singing for 5 years).

Due to a problem with his voice box, Once took a hiatus from singing between 1993 and 1997. He used this time to study law at the University of Indonesia, graduating in 1996. He also worked for a construction company.

==== Returning to the Music Scene ====
By 1997 he had begun singing again, in cafes, and after leaving the MSI LIPI project in 1998, Once became serious about his music career. To fulfill his ambition, he left his job and released a solo single titled 'Anggun.' Alongside Ahmad Dhani, he worked on recordings for the film Kuldesak. Once was later asked to join Dhani's band, Dewa 19, in 2000, and eventually replaced Ari Lasso, who was expelled from the group for drug use. He proved himself to become the main factor of Dewa's success. He officially joined the band in 2000. Once was eventually accepted by Dewa 19's fans after Bintang Lima, his first album with the group, was a hit; it eventually sold 1.7 million copies. He later recorded four more albums with Dewa 19. In 2004, Once had a hit single "Separuh Nafasku" ("Half of My Breath"). He also released three solo singles, "Dealova", "Aku Mau" ("I Want"), and "Symphony yang Indah" ("A Beautiful Symphony").

In 2011, Once left Dewa, and the band is currently inactive

==== Solo career ====
In the late 2010s, Once, the husband of Ima Angelica and father of Manuel Mekel decided to focus on his solo career. His debut solo album, titled Once, was released in 2012, preceded by the singles 'Pasti Untukmu' and 'Hilang Naluri' in 2011. From this album, Once Mekel received three awards at the 2013 AMI Awards: "Best Rock Album (Once Album)," "Best Production Work (Mystified)," and "Best Record Album Producer (Once Album)."

Aside from his role as the vocalist of the band Once, he also performed solo several times, such as singing the single 'Dealova' (from the film Dealova). His debut as a solo singer earned him two awards: Best Male Solo Pop Singer and Best Pop Song at the 2006 AMI Awards. Apart from 'Dealova,' Once Mekel also released his solo singles 'Kucinta Kau Apa Adanya (Aku Mau)' and 'Simphony yang Indah.'

To date, Once has released three solo albums, with the latest being the 2023 release, SIGMA, featuring the singles "Ditentukan untuk Bersama" and "Untuk Kita." The SIGMA album was sold in CD format in collaboration with PT.JMSI and became the best-selling album for several weeks in KFC outlets across Indonesia.

==== Venturing into NFT World ====
In 2022, Once, along with his colleagues such as Derek Sherenian, Ron 'Bumblefoot' Thal, Simon Phillips, Jeff Scott Soto, Billy Sheehan, Indra Putra, and Edo Widiz, formed the Dream Team Project and collaborated with WiseArt, a Geneva-based NFT Green company, to enter the NFT music world by launching the song titled "Human Nature." The song revolves around environmental concerns. In 2016, he, along with Elizabeth Tan, Mey Chan, and Mike Mohede, became a judge on the talent show Just Duet on NET. In December 2022, Once Mekel collaborated with StarX to introduce the Intrinsik Multi Produksi platform or IMProduction, claiming to play a role in environmental friendliness. The release of NFTs opens opportunities for musicians and artists to earn higher profits.

==== Musical Judging and Organizational Roles ====
In 2023, Once became the Executive Chairman of the Bersratus Concert. The grand concert, held to celebrate National Music Day, was a collaboration between the Indonesian Association of Singers, Songwriters, and Musicians (PAPPRI) with Don Sistem Suara (DSS) and Kibordis Untuk Bangsa Indonesia (KUBi). The event featured 100 singers and 100 keyboardists at Lippo Mall Kemang on 18 March 2023.

He is now the Head of the Program and Music Production Department of PAPPRI and also the Chairman of the 20th National Music Day (HMN20) in 2023.

===== AMI Awards =====
On 22 June 2016, Once was appointed by AMI Awards Chairman, Dwiki Dharmawan to be involved in management for the 2016-2020 period.

==== Political career ====
Once decided to join the Indonesian Democratic Party of Struggle and became a legislative candidate for Jakarta 2, covering South Jakarta, Central Jakarta, and Overseas regions.

== Discography ==
Fargat 727

- Seribu Angan (1991)

Dewa 19

- Bintang Lima (2000)
- Cintailah Cinta (2002)
- Laskar Cinta (2004)
- Republik Cinta (2006)

Once (Solo Career)

- Once (2012)
- Intrinsik (2015)
- Sigma (2023)

=== Singles ===
- Anggun (1999)
- Dealova (2004)
- Kucinta Kau Apa Adanya (2006)
- Symphony Yang Indah (2011)
- Ditentukan Untuk Bersama (2022)
- Untuk Kita (2023)

== Awards ==
Voted Best Pop Soloist at the 2005 Anugerah Musik Indonesia (AMI). The following year, one of his songs was voted Best Pop Song at AMI.

== Personal life ==
Once is a devout Protestant Christian. On 20 December 2005, Once married his girlfriend of 3 years, Rietmadhanty Angelica Tauchid (Ima), affectionately known as Ima. During the wedding ceremony, Ima arrived in a vintage car once used by President Sukarno as the presidential vehicle. The wedding reception was held in the evening at Hotel Mulia. Ima is the daughter of senior singer Henny Purwonegoro.
