= Mey Chan =

Indonesian singer

Dita
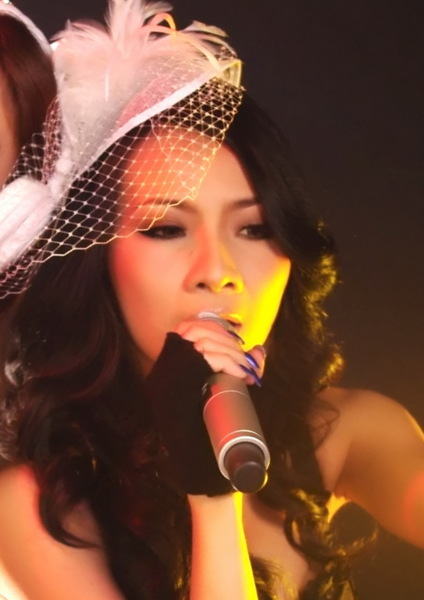
- Mey Chan (2010)

Background information
- Born: Dita Anggraeni; 14 May 1986 (age 40)
- Origin: Malang, East Java, Indonesia
- Genres: Pop
- Occupation: Singer
- Instrument: Vocals
- Years active: 2007-present
- Labels: Le Moesiek Revole (2012-2018); MANS Entertainment (2018-present)

Dita (formerly known as Mey Chan, born 14 May 1986, Malang) is an Indonesian singer who is a former member of the band MAIA .

== Biography ==
=== Duo MAIA ===
At 2008, Chan passed an audition and was selected by Maia Estianty to join her. But finally Mey joined Maia and released the album titled Duo Maia, Maia & Friends (2008).

== Discography ==
=== MAIA ===
- Maia & Friends (2008)
- Sang Juara (2009)
- Maia Pasto with the Stars (2015)

=== Singles ===
- Jangan Selingkuh
- Gengsi Setengah Mati
- Korban Cinta
- Setia (2018, as Dita)
- Ibu (2019, as Dita)
- Lagu Rindu (2020, as Dita)

== Filmography ==
- XXL-Double Extra Large (2009)
