= Mulan Jameela =

Indonesian singer and politician (born 1979)

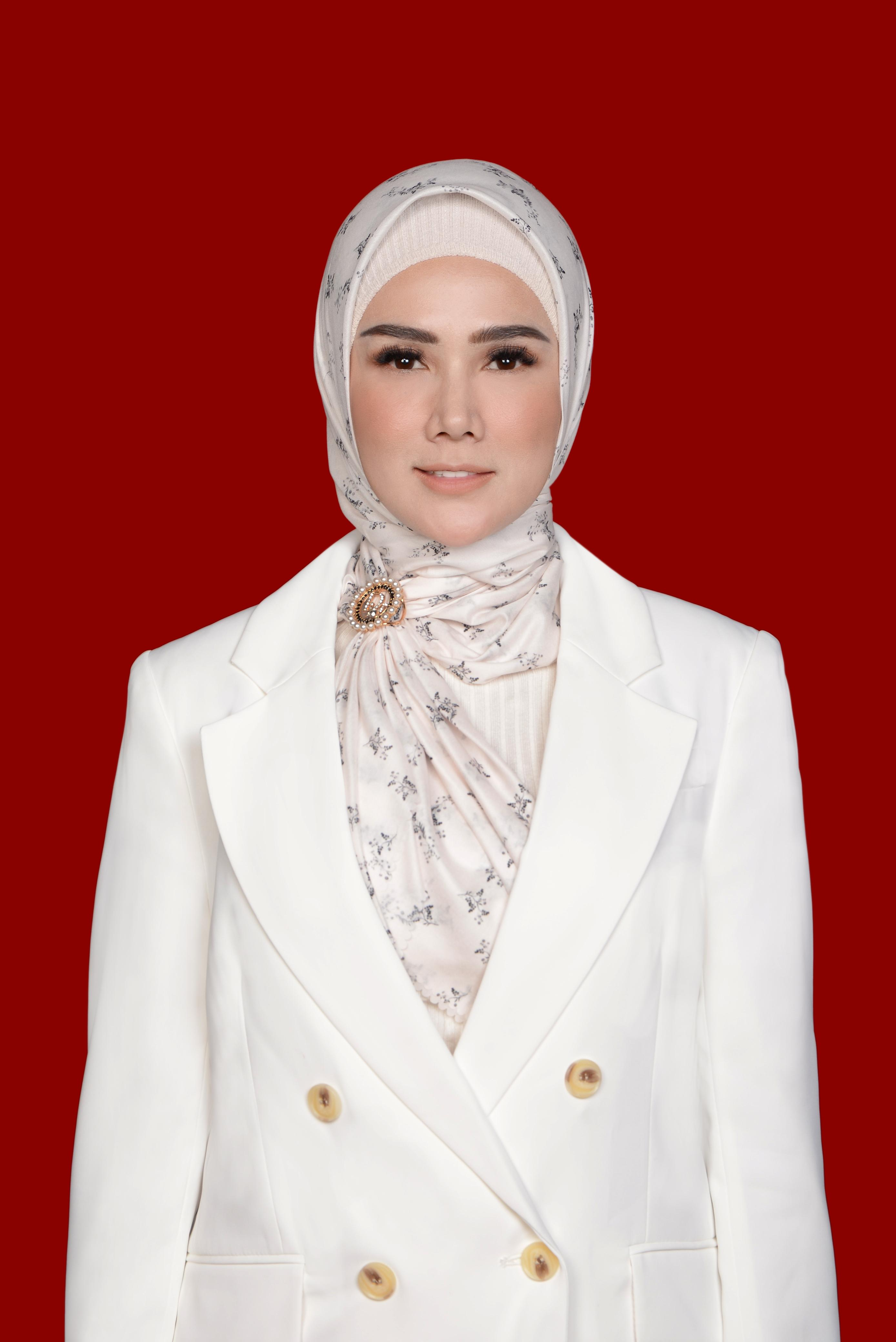

Member of People's Representative Council
- Incumbent
- Assumed office 1 October 2019
- Constituency: West Java XI

Personal details
- Born: Raden Wulansari; 23 August 1979 (age 47) Garut, West Java, Indonesia
- Party: Gerindra
- Musical career
- Also known as: Mulan Kwok, Muje
- Origin: Malangbong, Indonesia
- Genres: Pop rock; pop; R&B; rock; dance-pop; alternative rock; glam rock; slow rock
- Years active: 1997–present
- Labels: GP Records; Musica Studios (distributor); Universal Indonesia
- Spouses: Harry Nugraha (m. 1999; div. 2005); Ahmad Dhani (m. 2009)

Mulan Jameela (born Raden Wulansari on 23 August 1979) is an Indonesian singer, actress, and politician. In 2019, she became a member of the People's Representative Council (Indonesian: Dewan Perwakilan Rakyat, DPR) from the Gerindra Party, representing West Java.

== Music career ==
=== Career with Ratu ===
Mulan started her career as a café singer and joined several bands. Her popularity began when she formed a duo Ratu with Maia Ahmad in 2005. The duo released an album on the Sony BMG label in August 2005, entitled Ratu & Friends. The first single of the album, "Teman Tapi Mesra" quickly rocketed Mulan's name as one of the most popular singers in Indonesia. Peaking number 1 in Indonesia for several weeks, the single also gained commercial success on numerous radio stations in Malaysia and Singapore. The album sold over 400,000 copies (certified Double Platinum) and established Ratu as the most successful female group at the time.

The following year, Ratu released another album, entitled No. Satu, which sold 500,000 copies in the first week. The singles, "Lelaki Buaya Darat" and "Dear Diary" landed at number 1 on the charts. Ratu also won several awards, one of them is Anugerah Musik Indonesia (Indonesian Music Awards) in 2006.

However, Mulan quit Ratu in 2007. She later started to establish her own solo career and signed to EMI Indonesia.

=== Solo career ===
She released her debut self-titled album, Mulan Jameela, in January 2008, and changed her stage name to Mulan Jameela. The first single from the debut album, "Makhluk Tuhan Paling Sexy", rose to number 1 and competed with the single of her ex-partner, Maia. Her second single, "Wonder Woman" also gained commercial success, peaking at number 1 on several charts in Indonesia.

The album has certified platinum only several weeks into 2008 for selling more than 100,000 copies.

== Political career ==
In the 2019 Indonesian general election, she was elected to become a member of the People's Representative Council for the 2019–2024 period for the Great Indonesia Movement Party (Gerindra), from electoral district (daerah pemilihan, Dapil) West Java XI, receiving 24,192 votes. She was reelected for a second term in the 2024 election with 83,526 votes.

== Discography ==
Solo Album Wulan

- 1997: Aku Tetap Tersenyum

Solo Album Wulan Ardina

- 2000: Kekal

Ratu

- 2005: Ratu & Friends
- 2006: No. Satu

Solo album

- 2001: Bidadari
- 2002: Menanti
- 2003: Kurindukan
- 2008: Mulan Jameela
- 2013: 99 Volume 1
- 2016: 99 Volume 2 Patience
