= Radja =

Indonesian rock band

- Origin: Banjarmasin, Indonesia
- Genres: Rock, Malay pop, alternative rock, hard rock, pop rock, post-grunge, power pop
- Years active: 2000—present
- Labels: EMI Indonesia; Universal Indonesia; GP Records; Istana Musik
- Members: Ian Kasela (Vocals); Moldy Kusnadi (Guitar); Aldi Rizky (Keyboard); Indra Riwayat (Bass); Seno Wibowo (Drums)
- Past members: Shuma (Bass); Adit Taher (Drums); Muhammad Vidin (Drums)
- Website: radjaband.com

Radja is an Indonesian rock band.

== History ==
Radja was formed in Banjarmasin, Indonesia, on 17 March 1999 and originally consisted of brothers Ian Kasela (vocals) and Moldy Kusnadi (guitar), as well as drummer Adit Taher and bassist Shuma. In their early days, the band performed in exchange for Nasi Bungkus, a humble Indonesian rice dish, at local cafes. Their name is a form of raja, meaning "king".

In 2001, the band debuted with Lepas Masa Lalu. Unfortunately, due to their label's failure to properly market the album, it never gained any traction and was overall considered a flop. Shuma and Adit left the band not long after and were replaced with bassist Indra Riwayat and drummer Seno Wilbowo. Their second album, Manusia Biasa, sold only 60,000 copies when it was released in 2003.

Their third album, Langkah Baru, was the first Radja released under EMI Music Indonesia and was significantly more successful. Though it contained three new songs, it was primarily a "repackaging" of tracks from previous albums; nonetheless, it sold 1.2 million copies upon its release in 2004 and soared to platinum status in Indonesia. It was one of the top 15 best-selling albums of the year from the EMI Group.

In 2006, they re-released Aku Ada Karena Kau Ada and debuted 1000 Bulan ("1,000 Months"), an Islam themed album, producing 75,000 copies which were only available during that year's Ramadhan. The band's next album was launched in April 2008, titled Membumi.

Because of conflicts over what type of labels to work with, Indra and Seno left the band in 2010 to form Audio Jet and were replaced by Oji, Muhammad Vidin, and Radja keyboardist and synthesizer Aldi Rizky. Seno and Indra returned in 2015. Radja went on a brief hiatus, wherein they did not release music for three years; Ian claims this is due to the band's difficulty adapting to a more digital music market. In 2018, they established their own record label, Istana Musik.

In 2020, they released a new single, "Jangan Mudik Dulu", urging listeners to stay home and take precautions during the COVID-19 pandemic. It also speculates that the COVID-19 pandemic is God's will. They also released "Hidup dan Mati". Their 2021 single, "Sapu Jagat", which focuses on Muslim prayer, was accused of plagiarizing Nissa Sabyan, which Radja denied.

Radja fans are referred to as Radjaku.

== Discography ==
Year	Title	Single(s)	Label	Ref(s).
2001	Lepas Masa Lalu	"Biar Aku Menjagamu"	Universal Music Indonesia	
2003	Manusia Biasa	"Cinderella", "Jujur"	Malta Music Indonesia	
2004	Langkah Baru	"Tulus", "Manusia Biasa", "Jujur", "Bulan"	EMI Music Indonesia	
2006	Aku Ada Karna Kau Ada	"Benci Bilang Cinta", "Pelangi", "Aku Ada Karna Kau Ada", "Angin", "Ikhlas", "Yakin"	EMI Music Indonesia	
2006	1000 Bulan	"Malam 1000 Bulan"	EMI Music Indonesia	
2007	Untuk Semua	"Patah Hati", "Jangan Sakiti Aku"	Arka Music Indonesia	
2008	Membumi	"Sama Sama Suka", "Pelarian Cinta", "Seandainya"	Arka Music Indonesia	
2009	Selalu Ada	"Ga Ada Waktu", "Cantik"	Arka Music Indonesia	
2010	Terus Terang	"Paris Barantai"	Arka Music Indonesia	
2011	Aku Di Tanganmu	"Kegagalan Cinta", "Call Me", "Ampuni Aku"	Nagaswara	
2012	Ayo Melangkah	"Cukup Aku Saja", "Demi Kamu", "Maaf"	Nagaswara	
2015	The Best of Radja			
2016	Lagu Banjar			
2017	Menembus Batas	"Hebat", "Mimpi Indah", "Lemah Tanpamu", "Aw... Galau", "Parah", "Setia"	Istana Musik	
	Radja			

=== Singles ===
Year	Title	Album	Label	Ref(s).
2001	"Biar Aku Menjagamu"	Lepas Masa Lalu	Universal Music Indonesia	
2003	"Cinderella"	Manusia Biasa	Malta Music Indonesia	
2003	"Jujur"	Manusia Biasa	Malta Music Indonesia	
2004	"Tulus"	Langkah Baru	EMI Music Indonesia	
2004	"Manusia Biasa"	Langkah Baru	EMI Music Indonesia	
2004	"Bulan"	Langkah Baru	EMI Music Indonesia	
2006	"Pelangi"	Aku Ada Karna Kau Ada	EMI Music Indonesia	
2006	"Benci Bilang Cinta"	Aku Ada Karna Kau Ada	EMI Music Indonesia	
2006	"Aku Ada Karna Kau Ada"	Aku Ada Karna Kau Ada	EMI Music Indonesia	
2006	"Angin"	Aku Ada Karna Kau Ada	EMI Music Indonesia	
2006	"Ikhlas"	Aku Ada Karna Kau Ada	EMI Music Indonesia	
2006	"Yakin"	Aku Ada Karna Kau Ada	EMI Music Indonesia	
2007	"Pak Pung Pak Mustape"	Untuk Semua	Arka Music Indonesia	
2007	"Naik Sepeda"	Untuk Semua	Arka Music Indonesia	
2007	"Patah Hati"	Untuk Semua	Arka Music Indonesia	
2008	"Sama Sama Suka"	Membumi	Arka Music Indonesia	
2008	"Pelarian Cinta"	Membumi	Arka Music Indonesia	
2008	"Seandainya"	Membumi	Arka Music Indonesia	
2009	"Ga Ada Waktu"	Selalu Ada	Arka Music Indonesia	
2009	"Cantik"	Selalu Ada	Arka Music Indonesia	
2010	"Sapu Tangan Babuncu Ampat"	Terus Terang	Arka Music Indonesia	
2010	"Paris Barantai"	Terus Terang	Arka Music Indonesia	
2011	"Kegagalan Cinta"	Aku Di Tanganmu	Nagaswara	
2011	"Call Me"	Aku Di Tanganmu	Nagaswara	
2011	"Ampuni Aku"	Aku Di Tanganmu	Nagaswara	
2012	"Cukup Aku Saja"	Ayo Melangkah	Nagaswara	
2012	"Maaf"	Ayo Melangkah	Nagaswara	
2012	"Demi Kamu"	Ayo Melangkah	Nagaswara	
2013	"Menanti Pagi"			
2013	"Cinta Bukan Mainan"	Aku di Tanganmu	Nagaswara	
2014	"Aku Datang Lagi"	Aku di Tanganmu	Nagaswara	
2015	"Ratu Cinta"			
2016	"Di Tanganmu"			
2017	"Syukur"			
2017	"Surga yang dirindukan"			
2017	"Biarkan waktu yang menjawab"			
2017	"Ampar ampar Pisang"	Terus Terang	Arka Music Indonesia	
2017	"Setia"	Menembus Batas	Istana Musik	
2017	"Aw... Galau"	Menembus Batas	Istana Musik	
2017	"Hebat"	Menembus Batas	Istana Musik	
2017	"Mimpi Indah"	Menembus Batas	Istana Musik	
2017	"Lemah Tanpamu"	Menembus Batas	Istana Musik	
2017	"Parah"	Diaspora Love in Taipei soundtrack Menembus Batas		
2018	"Calon Presiden"	Calon Presiden soundtrack		
2018	"Bismillah"			
2018	"Move On"			
2018	"Melody of the King"	Aku di Tanganmu	Nagaswara	
2018	"Malaikat Cinta"			
2019	"Karna Rupiah"			
2019	"Pantaskah (Jadi Penghuni Surga)"			
2020	"Apa Salah dan Dosaku" (cover)	Jangan Mudik		
2020	"Mangapa Harus Jumpa" (cover)			
2020	"Tak Mungkin" (cover)	Membumi	Arka Music Indonesia	
2020	"Titik Noda" (cover)			
2020	"Hidup di bui" (cover)	Menembus Batas	Istana Musik	
2020	"Jangan Mudik"	Jangan Mudik		
2020	"Ibadah di Rumah"			
2020	"Hidup dan Mati"			
2021	"Sapu Jagat"			
??	Takkan Melupakanmu			
2021	"Yakin"			
