= Dewa 19 =

Indonesian rock band

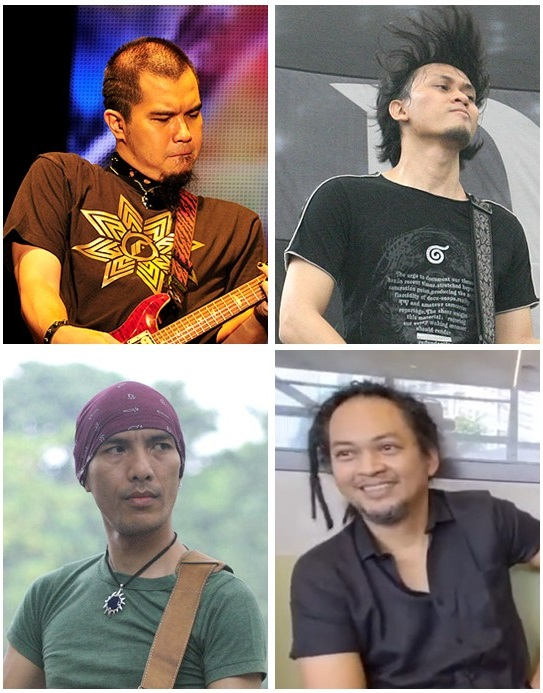

Background information
- Also known as: Dewa, Dewa19, Down Beat
- Origin: Surabaya, Indonesia
- Genres: Rock, pop rock, soft rock, alternative rock, symphonic rock, hard rock, pop metal, arena rock
- Years active: 1986-2011, 2019-present
- Labels: Team Records, Aquarius Musikindo, EMI Indonesia, GP Records, Universal Music Indonesia, Republik Cinta Management
- Spinoffs: Ahmad Band, Andra and the Backbone, MahadewA, T.R.I.A.D
- Members: Ahmad Dhani; Andra Ramadhan; Yuke Sampurna; Agung Yudha
- Past members: Ari Lasso; Erwin Prasetya; Wawan Juniarso; Wong Aksan; Setyo Nugroho (Tyo Nugros); Elfonda Mekel (Once)
- Website: www.dewa19.com

Dewa 19 (pronounced in Indonesian as Dewa Sembilan Belas) is an Indonesian rock band from Surabaya, East Java, led by singer-songwriter Ahmad Dhani. Along with God Bless and Slank, they are dubbed as one of the greatest rock bands in the history of Indonesian popular music. The band was formed in 1986. There have been a number of changes to the lineup that ended in their disbandment in 2011; the band regrouped in 2019 for comeback reunion shows.

The current line-up consists of Ahmad Dhani, Andra Ramadhan (both as the remaining original members), Yuke Sampurna and Agung Yudha. Having no lead vocalists in the current line-up, starting in 2019, the band's shows continuously feature guest vocalists Ari Lasso, Once Mekel (both were previously Dewa 19's members as lead vocalists), Virzha, and Marcello Tahitoe. The band may feature either one, some, or up to four vocalists at a time.

Dewa 19 achieved mainstream success through the 1990s with Ari Lasso on lead vocals, and even greater success in the 2000s when Once Mekel was recruited as the new lead vocalist, and the release of "Bintang Lima" which introduced the band's new musical direction. The release is the 7th Indonesian all time best selling album with sales of nearly 2 million copies.

In 2025, Hai magazine named Dewa 19 as the richest band in Indonesia with revenues reaching more than 14 billion a year. In the midst of the success, the group had stumbled several times over legal issues, including issues of copyright infringement and feud with Islamic organizations.

Throughout their career, Dewa 19 has sold over 7 millions album in Indonesia only and has received many awards, both BASF Awards and AMI Awards. They have also won the LibForAll Award in the United States for their contributions to peace efforts and religious tolerance. In 2008, Dewa 19 (as a band) and Ahmad Dhani (individually, founding member) are included in the list of "The Immortals: The 25 Greatest Indonesian Artists of All Time" by Rolling Stone Indonesia magazine.

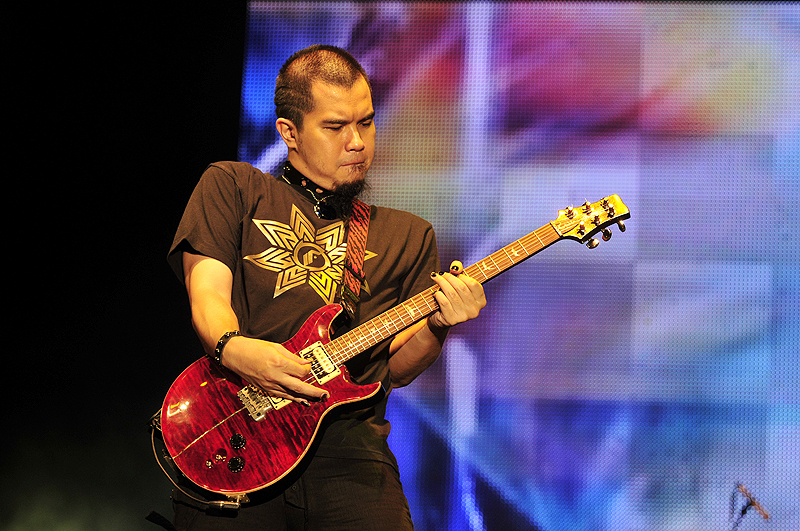
Ahmad Dhani in a 2009 concert

== History ==
=== Beginnings (1986–1991) ===
Dewa was formed in 1986 by four students from SMAN 2 Surabaya. The name Dewa is an acronym of the founding members' names: D from Dhani (keyboard, vocals), E from Erwin Prasetya (bass guitar), W from Wawan Juniarso (drums) and A from Andra (guitar). Dewa is also an Indonesian word meaning 'god', or 'deity'. The band was initially based at Wawan's dorm at Airlangga University.

Wanting to take a different direction, Wawan left the band in 1988 and formed Outsider with Raihan. The name Dewa was changed to Down Beat which became reasonably well known in East Java during that time.

When rock band Slank became famous, Wawan was asked to rejoin Dewa to rejuvenate the band and Ari Lasso was invited too. When the band's members were 19 years old, Down Beat changed its name to Dewa 19. Due to the lack of a studio that met their requirements in Surabaya, the band moved to Jakarta, where after a number of rejections by record companies, a Dewa 19 master was finally recorded by Team Records.

=== 1992-1994: First album and early success ===
The first album Dewa 19 was released in 1992. Exceeding expectations, the album received awards from BASF in the categories of Best Newcomer and Most Popular Album of 1993. In this album their signature songs are "Kangen (Longing)" and "Kita Tidak Sedang Bercinta Lagi (We Are Not Making Love Anymore)". During the making of the second album Format Masa Depan which was released in 1994, Wawan left the band again due to incompatibility between the members.

=== 1995–1999: Terbaik Terbaik, Pandawa Lima, mainstream success and conflict ===
After their 1995 album Terbaik-Terbaik was completed, Wong Aksan joined the band as drummer. This album has the concept of pop rock music which was developed by adding elements of jazz, folk, funk, glam metal, hard rock, power pop, psychedelic, pop and ballad. Many music observers believe that this is the best album Dewa 19 has ever made that established them as one of the most creative big band groups in Indonesia. The December 2007 issue of Rolling Stone Magazine, put the album in 26th position in the list of "150 Best Indonesian Albums of All Time". Meanwhile, their first single, titled "Cukup Siti Nurbaya" was ranked 20th in the list of "150 Best Indonesian Songs of All Time" by the December 2009 issue of Rolling Stone magazine.

Apart from "Cukup Siti Nurbaya", the Best Best album also released other hit singles such as "Satu Hati (We Should)" and the ballad "Cinta 'Kan Membawamu Kembali". Through this album Dewa won another BASF Awards for "Best Rock Music Group", "Best Recording Group / Duo" and "Best Recorded Music System". The video clip of "Cukup Siti Nurbaya (Enough Siti Nurbaya)" was also awarded as the "Best Video Clip" at the Indonesian Music Video event. Album Terbaik-terbaik has sold 500,000 copies in Indonesia. Since this album, Dewa 19 began using the term Baladewa to refer to their fans.

Wong Aksan departed after the following album Pandawa Lima was finished in 1997 and was replaced by Bimo Sulaksono, a former member of Netral. Not long thereafter, Bimo left Dewa 19 and together with Bebi formed the band Romeo. Dewa 19's fourth album entitled Pandawa Lima was released in 1997. Through this album, Dewa 19 won 6 awards at the 1997 Indonesian Music Award, namely for "Best Alternative Songs", "General Best Songs", "Duo / Best Alternative Groups", "Best Rhythm & Blues Album" and "Best Album Cover". This album gave birth to a number of hits including "Kirana" and "Kamulah Satu-Satunya". Both of these songs won the Indonesian Music Video award as "Favorite Video Clips". Pandawa Lima has sold more than 800 thousand pieces and received a 5× Platinum certificate

In addition to the problem of frequent changes to the lineup, Dewa 19 also suffered from the implications of the alleged drug addiction problems of two other band members. Erwin entered a rehabilitation program to end a drug dependency which was ultimately successful. Ari Lasso also experienced drug addiction problem that led to his vocal difficulties which made Ari depart from the band in 1999, and Dhani insisted that the vocalist role be replaced by Once whom he met in 1997. The vacant drummer's seat was taken by Tyo Nugros. In 1999, Dewa released the album The Best of Dewa 19, which contained his best works during Ari Lasso being a vocalist. This album contains two new songs namely "Elang" and "Persembahan dari Surga". This album was once again successful even without a piece of promotion with sold over 1.000.000 copies.

=== 2000-2011: blockbuster success and disbanded ===
In 2000, Dewa made a breakthrough, along with the release time of their fifth album Bintang Lima, the band changed their name from Dewa 19 back to Dewa. Bintang Lima was a huge commercial success, selling over 1.7 million copies in Indonesia. It is the highest selling album in the band's career history. When they recorded the album, Erwin returned to the band as bass guitar player. In this album, their signature songs are "Roman Picisan", "Dua Sejoli", "Risalah Hati", "Separuh Nafas", "Cemburu", "Lagu Cinta" & "Sayap-Sayap Patah". Dewa then toured 36 cities to promote the album while introducing their new formation. Through this album, Dewa won three AMI Awards 2000, namely "Best Singer / Group", "Best Song" ("Roman Picisan") and "Best Album". Rolling Stone Magazine ranked the album 96th in the list of "150 Best Indonesian Albums".

In 2002, "Arjuna Mencari Cinta", one of Dewa's hit songs in the album, "Cintailah Cinta", was plagued by copyright issues and eventually the band was forced to change the name to "Arjuna" only. Erwin left due to differences with the band's management and was replaced by Yuke Sampurna, former bassist of The Groove. In this album, their signature songs are "Arjuna", "Kosong", "Mistikus Cinta", "Pupus", "Cintailah Cinta", "Kasidah Cinta", & "Air Mata". This album also gained success like its predecessor. Before it was officially released on the market, this album had already sold 200,000 copies. Total album sales have reached more than 1.04 million copies. At the 2002 AMI Awards, Dewa was given three awards for the categories "Best Duo / Pop Group", "Best Song" ("Arjuna") and "Best Album Cover".

In 2004, Dewa released a live album entitled Atas Nama Cinta I & II followed by the studio album Laskar Cinta. Later, in the same year, Dewa returned their name to Dewa 19 again. In this album, they recorded one English song, "Sweetest Place" along with their hit songs, "Pangeran Cinta", "Satu", "Hidup Ini Indah" and "Hadapi Dengan Senyuman", and successfully sold over 600,000 copies.

In 2006, their eighth studio album Republik Cinta was released with new record label EMI Music. The album has spawned three radio hit singles: "Laskar Cinta", "Selimut Hati" and "Sedang Ingin Bercinta". Republik Cinta album managed to produce an award at the 2006 AMI Awards. Dewa 19 won the award of "Best Rock Group" and "Best Album". Not only that, vocalist Dewa, Once also won an award as "Best Male Solo Singer" through his solo project. Republik Cinta's own album sold 450.000 copies for 3.5 weeks. In March 2006, the album also won a platinum certificate in Malaysia. This year, Dewa was also named the "Surabaya Ambassador" for their success and achievements as a music group originating from Surabaya.

In 2007, Tyo Nugros left Dewa 19 due to a leg injury that left him unable to play drums. He was replaced by Agung Yudha.

Dewa 19 held large-scale concerts in five cities in Malaysia, namely: Kota Kinabalu, Kuching, Johor Bahru, Penang and Kuala Lumpur during December 2007. Dewa then performed a concert at the State Stadium, Kuala Lumpur. Dewa 19 made a musical history in Malaysia where a band performed in five major cities in Malaysia in a month. In this concert, Dewa 19 took a number of top Malaysian singers including Ella and Sheila Majid.

In 2011, Ahmad Dhani announced Elfonda 'Once' Mekel has left the band on January 19. Dhani auditioned many singers for lead singer, the strongest candidate was Judika Sihotang, the runner-up winner of 2005 Indonesian Idol singing contest, who was later put into Dhani's side project Mahadewa. Answering rumors that the band had broken up Ahmad Dhani stated that Dewa 19 is currently disbanded, but hasn't permanently broken up.

=== 2012-2022: Hiatus, Post-Dewa 19 activities ===
Each member of Dewa 19 has developed their own side projects. Dhani is now the president and manager of his own Republik Cinta (Love Republic) Management, which produces/manages various artists and groups, such as The Virgin, Mulan Jameela, he is also playing for The Rock (now T.R.I.A.D.) and Mahadewa (featuring Judika as the lead vocal).

Meanwhile, Andra plays guitar for his own group Andra and The BackBone, Wong Aksan became the drummer for the group Potret, Erwin was the bassist for the group Matadewa and collaborated with various musicians, Yuke joined a supergroup AYLI Project, Ari Lasso developed his solo career and joined AYLI Project, and Once developed a solo career and also joined AYLI Project.

In 2019, Dewa 19 performed reunion shows, which features the original vocalists (Ari Lasso and Once), and Virzha (3rd winner of Indonesian Idol season 8, where Dhani was one of the panel judge). Virzha then was featured on Dewa 19's further shows.

Former bassist Erwin Prasetya died on May 2, 2020, at the age of 48.

=== 2022-present: Dewa 19 comeback ===
On February 28, 2022, the band announced Marcello Tahitoe as their new lead vocalist after eleven years since Once's departure. Ahmad Dhani later said that Dewa 19 now has 4 vocalists; Ari Lasso, Once (both were the original lead singer of Dewa 19), Virzha, and Ello. Knowing all vocalists has their own solo projects, Dewa 19 will perform with either one, two, three, or four of those vocalists at a time, depends on their availability.

On December 13, 2022, Dewa 19 again announced Ari Lasso as Dewa 19's senior vocalist after his hiatus 23 years ago.

On February 15, 2023, Dewa 19 released a new single "Love Is Blind", featuring "All-Stars" which includes Dino Jelusick (known for his work at Trans-Siberian Orchestra), Jeff Scott Soto (known for his work with Talisman, Journey, Yngwie Malmsteen, Trans-Siberian Orchestra, Sons of Apollo), Ron "Bumblefoot" Thal (known for his work with Guns N' Roses, Sons of Apollo), Derek Sherinian (known for his work at Dream Theater, Sons of Apollo), Simon Phillips (former member of Toto, Judas Priest, The Who), and Billy Sheehan (known for his work with Mr. Big, David Lee Roth, The Winery Dogs, Sons of Apollo).

== Discography ==
=== Studio albums ===
Title	Album details	Sales
19 (also known as Dewa 19)	Released: 1992; Label: Aquarius Musikindo	400,000+
Format Masa Depan	Released: 1994; Label: Aquarius Musikindo	300,000+
Terbaik Terbaik	Released: 1995; Label: Aquarius Musikindo	500,000+
Pandawa Lima^{[a]}	Released: 1997; Label: Aquarius Musikindo	800,000+
Bintang Lima	Released: 2000; Label: Aquarius Musikindo	1,800,000+
Cintailah Cinta	Released: 2002; Label: Aquarius Musikindo	1,040,000+
Laskar Cinta	Released: 2004; Label: Aquarius Musikindo	570.000+
Republik Cinta	Released: 2006; Label: EMI	450.000+
Kerajaan Cinta	Released: 2007; Label: EMI	—N/a

=== Live albums ===
- Atas Nama Cinta I & II (2004)
- Live in Japan (limited edition DVD) (2005)

=== Compilation albums ===
- The Best Of Dewa 19 (1999)
- The Best Of Republik Cinta Artists Vol. 1 (2008)
- The Best Of Republik Cinta Vol. 2 (2009)
- The Greatest Hits Remastered (2013)
- The 2000's [sic] Greatest (2016)

== Band members ==
Members

- Ahmad Dhani – keyboards, drums, rhythm guitar, backing and lead vocals (1986–present)
- Andra Ramadhan – lead guitar, backing vocals (1986–present)
- Yuke Sampurna – bass guitar, backing vocals (2002–present)
- Agung Yudha – drums (2007–present)

=== Guest Vocals ===
- Ari Lasso - lead vocals (1991–1999), guest vocals (2016–present)
- Once Mekel - lead vocals (1999–2011), guest vocals (2019–2023)
- Virzha – guest vocals (2021–present)
- Marcello Tahitoe – guest vocals (2022–present)

=== Additional Members ===
- Vega Antares - 2nd rhythm guitar, sequencer, backing vocals
- Ibrani Pandean - additional bassist
- Farie Thafar - backing vocals
- Amank Syamsu - backing vocals

=== Former Members ===
- Wawan Juniarso – drums, backing vocals (1986–1988, 1991–1994)
- Erwin Prasetya – bass, backing vocals (1986–2002); deceased 2020
- Ari Lasso - lead vocals, keyboards (1991–1999)
- Wong Aksan – drums, backing vocals (1995–1998)
- Once Mekel – lead vocals, keyboards (1999–2011)
- Tyo Nugros – drums (1999–2007)

== Gallery ==
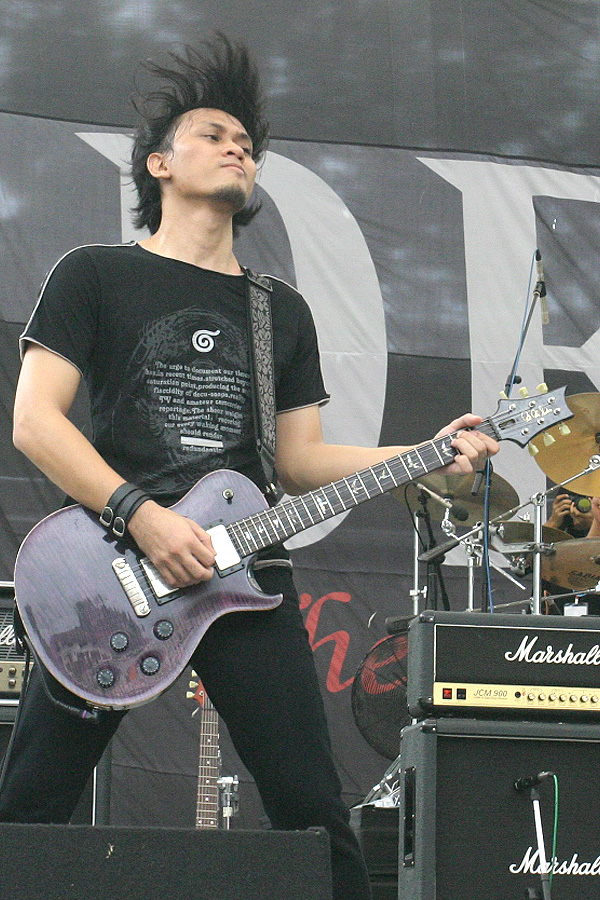
Andra in Dewa Concert in Fort Canning Singapore, 27 Feb 2005

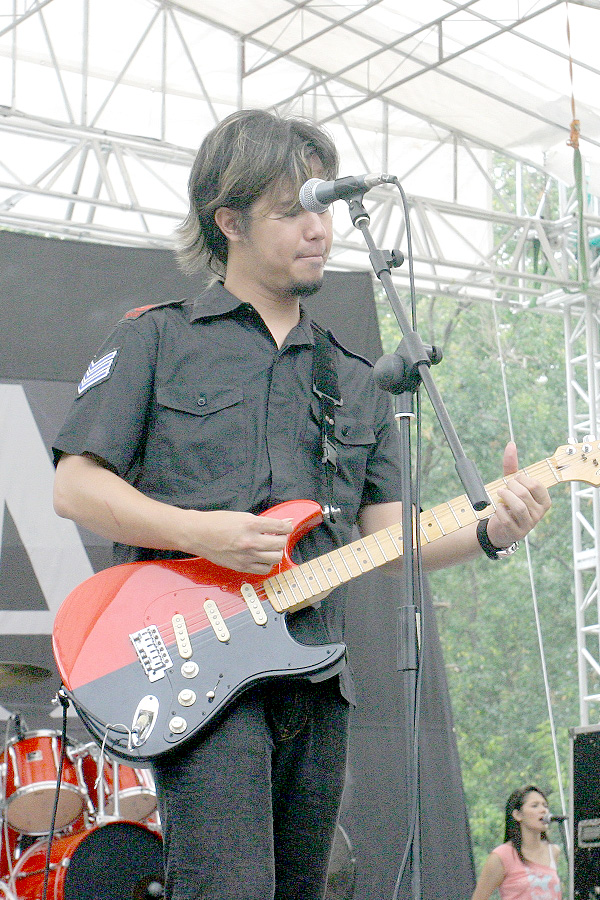
Ahmad Dhani in Dewa Concert in Fort Canning Singapore, 27 Feb 2005

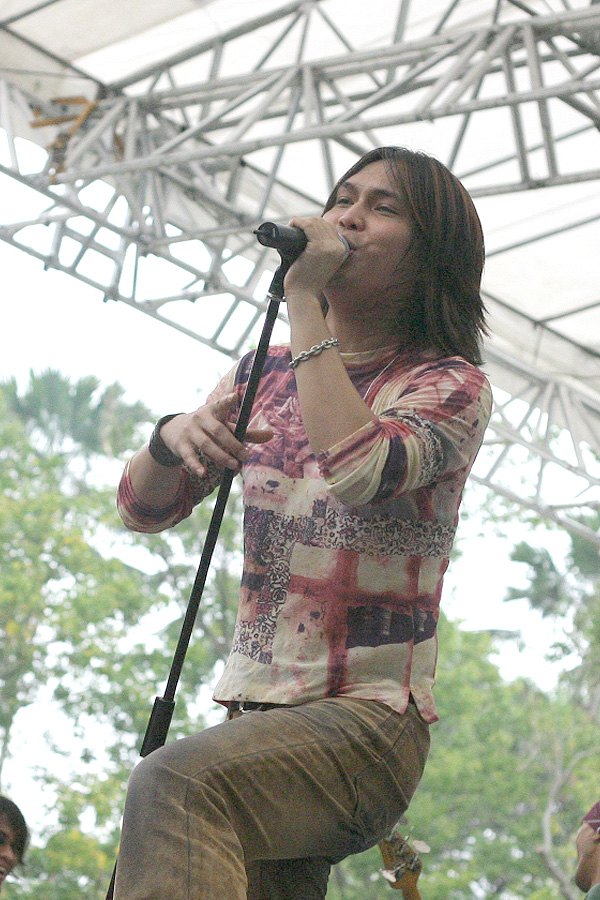
Once in Dewa Concert in Fort Canning Singapore, 27 Feb 2005

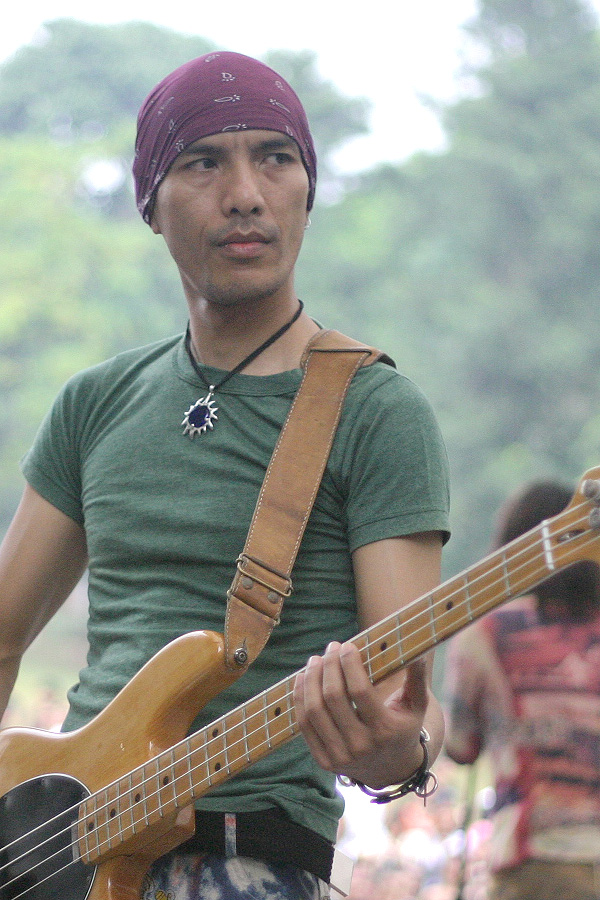
Yuke in Dewa Concert in Fort Canning Singapore, 27 Feb 2005

== See also ==
- List of Indonesian rock bands
- Ahmad Band
