= Ahmad Dhani =

Indonesian musician (born 1972)

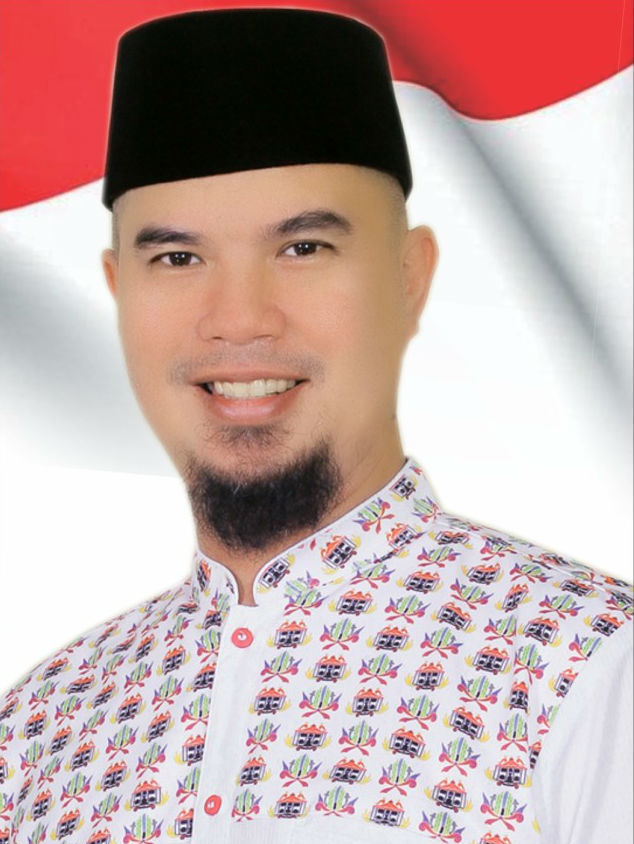
- Dhani in 2017

Background information
- Also known as: Dhani Ahmad, Dhani Manaf, Dhani Dewa, Dhani Ahmad Manaf
- Born: Dhani Ahmad Prasetyo; 26 May 1972 (age 54); Surabaya, Indonesia
- Genres: Rock, pop, hard rock, jazz fusion, soft rock, alternative rock, heavy metal, jazz, R&B, synth-rock
- Occupations: Musician; politician
- Instruments: Vocals; guitar; keyboards; piano; bass guitar; drums
- Years active: 1986–present
- Labels: EMI; GP Records; Universal Music
- Website: ahmaddhani.com
- Political party: Gerindra
- Spouses: Maia Estianty (m. 1996; div. 2008) Mulan Jameela (m. 2009)
- Children: 5

Dhani Ahmad Prasetyo (born 26 May 1972), better known as Ahmad Dhani, sometimes Dhani Ahmad, Dhani Ahmad Manaf, or simply Dhani, is an Indonesian musician, media personality and politician. He was the frontman of Dewa 19 (together with Once Mekel), Ahmad Band, and also a member of the inter-continental band, the Rock. He is the owner and chairman of Republik Cinta Management.

Dhani has worked as a promoter and songwriter for other artists, including Alexa Key and Mulan Jameela. He has won numerous awards, including the Indonesian Music Awards for best musical arrangement. He is one of the most influential musicians in Southeast Asia. In recent years, he has generated controversy after his son killed seven people while driving illegally and throughout his political career in the late 2010s. In January 2019, he was sentenced to 18 months in jail for hate speech. In June 2019, he was sentenced to an additional year in jail for insulting political rivals. He was released in December 2019.

== Early life ==
Dhani Ahmad Prasetyo was born in 1972 in Surabaya, East Java, as the first of three children of Eddy Abdul Manaf (26 August 1935 – 1 February 2012), a diplomat of Sundanese origin from Garut, West Java, and Joyce Theresia Pamela Kohler (born 29 August 1945), an Indonesian of German descent was the original drummer for Irama Puspita (now called Dara Puspita) before Susy Nander and a member of the bands Muda Ria and Visca Dara. In 2020, Dhani denied allegations that his maternal grandfather, Jan Pieter Friederich Kohler, a German born in the Dutch East Indies in 1883, was of Ashkenazi Jewish descent. Dhani said his mother and grandfather were German Catholics.

Dhani's stepbrother, Dadang S. Manaf, is a well-known Indonesian musician and was a strong influence on Dhani's musical interest from his childhood. Dhani's father bought him a keyboard when he was young and enrolled him in music lessons, hoping Dhani would excel in classical music. Dhani was largely influenced by the British rock band Queen.

== Career ==
=== Dewa 19 ===
Dhani formed his first musical group, Dewa, in 1986 with Andra Junaidi, Erwin Prasetya, and Wawan Juniarso. Dhani served as the group's vocalist and keyboardist. He skipped school to jam with his friends at Juniarso's house in the Airlangga University complex.

While in Dewa, Dhani became interested in jazz, and Dewa changed its name to Down Beat. Down Beat won the Youth Jazz Festival in East Java. It also won the inaugural Festival 90, a high school band competition that was part of the Djarum Super Fiesta Musical. The band, however, resumed playing rock, renaming itself "Dewa 19" with a new vocalist, Ari Lasso.

The lack of modern recording studios in Surabaya prompted Dhani to move to Jakarta in 1989 in search of a record deal for Dewa 19. After being rejected by several labels, Dewa 19 was signed to Team Records by Jan Djuhana. Their first album, Dewa 19 (1992), was a huge success with several hits such as Kangen and Kita Tidak Sedang Bercinta Lagi. It was the best-selling Indonesian rock album of 1993 and won Best Newcomer at the Indonesian Music Awards.

Dhani helped to produce the band's 11 albums, which included Dewa 19 (1992), Format Masa Depan (1994), Terbaik Terbaik (1995), Pandawa Lima (1997), The Best of Dewa 19 (1999), Bintang Lima (2000), Cintailah Cinta (2002), Atas Nama Cinta I & II (2004), Laskar Cinta (2004), Republik Cinta (2006), and Kerajaan Cinta (2007). Dewa 19 went through several personnel changes but remained one of the largest forces in the Indonesian music scene, with Dhani as its driving force, until breaking up in 2011.

Dhani's popular solo album Laskar Cinta (Warriors of Love) was praised because it "challenged militant ideology".

=== Solo projects ===
After Dewa disbanded, Dhani joined forces with the Australian heavy metal band, Hospital The Musical to form a band named the Rock. The band's first album, Master Mister Ahmad Dhani I, sold more than 150,000 copies in Indonesia. It contained three new songs and seven covers of Dhani's earlier songs. The hits from the album were "Kamu Kamulah Surgaku" and "Munajat Cinta".

Dhani next appeared in a band named TRIAD, an acronym for the Rock Indonesia Ahmad Dhani. Unlike the Rock, TRIAD has five to six members unofficially appearing onstage and even sometimes four members, with Dhani performing as lead singer and rhythm guitarist. Triad's self-titled album sold 500,000 copies. It contained four new tracks, "Selir Hati", "Benar Salah IDolaku", "Mama", and "Sedang Mikirin Kamu", and seven cover tracks, including Queen's "Mustapha".

In 2010, Dhani sang with Ari Lasso at concerts in Jakarta and Bali, leading to rumors of a Dewa 19 reunion. In Bali, Dhani announced he would form a band with Judika, the winner of Indonesian Idol 2007. A few months later, Dhani declared the new band would be named Mahadewa, which would substitute for Dewa 19, which he said still existed but in a vacuum. He dismissed rumors that Dewa 19 was finished. "I will focus on Mahadewa, my new band, and Dewa 19 still exists", he said. In January 2012, Mahadewa announced that its debut album would soon be released, containing five new songs and five covers of Dewa 19 songs. The album's first single, "Cinta Itu Buta", was released in mid-2012. The complete album's release was stalled because Dhani was preoccupied with his role as a judge on Indonesian Idol and X Factor Indonesia. However, he still found time for some reunion shows with former members of Dewa 19 in several big cities in Indonesia. Mahadewa's long-awaited debut album, Past to Present, was released in 2013. He also released his first song in Javanese, Aja Kuwi (Don't Choose Him) a few weeks before the 2014 presidential election.

=== Politics ===
In the 2024 Indonesian legislative election, Dhani ran as a Gerindra Party member for a seat in the House of Representatives representing Surabaya and Sidoarjo Regency, and was elected with 134,227 votes.

=== Views on music copyright ===
Beginning in the 2020s, Dhani's outspoken views regarding copyright protection and royalty payment in Indonesian music industry have attracted significant public attention. Dhani's statements on this subject have led to disputes between him and other musicians or public figures, most notably with pop singer Agnes Monica in 2025.

== Personal life ==
Although Dhani was born in Surabaya, he is actually a Sundanese and has Garut ancestry as well as Sumedang. Dhani married Maia Estianty in 1996, after a long relationship when Maia was still in high school in Surabaya. They have three sons named after prominent Sufi leaders whom Dhani admires, namely Ahmad Al Ghazali, Ahmad Jalaluddin "El" Rumi, and Abdul Qodir Jaelani. They formed a band named "The Lucky Laki" in 2009, although each also has their solo works starting in 2014. In late 2006, Dhani and Maia made mutual allegations of infidelity, resulting in Maia filing for divorce. Their marriage was annulled on 23 September 2008 by South Jakarta Religious Court. The divorce was known to be controversial and gained extensive media attention, particularly on the legal issues regarding the guardianship of their children and Dhani's later relationship with singer Mulan Jameela. In August 2013, Dhani admitted he had fathered a daughter with Mulan.

Dhani is an avid antique collector. Most of his collections are from the Dutch colonial era, and gained significant attention among several Indonesian YouTubers and media outlets who visited his home.

== Controversies ==
=== Jagorawi Toll Road crash ===
On 8 September 2013, at 1:45 a.m. local time, Dhani's then 13-year-old son Abdul Qodir Jaelani was illegally driving a Mitsubishi Lancer at 176 km/h on Jagorawi Toll Road and crashed against a Daihatsu Gran Max minivan after breaking through a road barrier into the opposite lane of the toll road. Jaelani survived the crash, but seven passengers of the minivan were killed. Police refused to charge Dhani over the accident for allowing his son to drive. State prosecutors in June 2014 recommended Jaelani be sentenced to two years probation. Following the incident, Dhani agreed to take responsibility by providing funds for the victims' families.

=== Political gaffes ===
In recent years, Dhani's involvement in Indonesian politics has attracted numerous controversies.

On 21 May 2014, Dhani announced his support for former general Prabowo Subianto for the 2014 presidential election. Dhani claimed in his campaign, "Almost every masculine man (lelaki jantan) votes for Prabowo. If a man doesn't vote for Prabowo, his masculinity (kejantanan) must be questioned."

In June 2014, Dhani released a short campaign video of Prabowo and his running mate Hatta Rajasa. The video featured Dhani and three Indonesian Idol contestants – Husein, Nowela, and Virzha – performing a song in Indonesian based on Queen's "We Will Rock You", with lyrics that included (translated here): "who will awaken Indonesia from its misery if not us? Prabowo-Hatta!" The video was widely condemned because Dhani used Queen's music without permission, and in the video, he wore a jacket designed after a Nazi uniform. The Nazi similarity was considered ironic since Dhani is of partial Jewish descent from his maternal grandmother. Dhani was also criticized for dancing in the video with a golden Garuda emblem, with critics considering it as an insult to Indonesia's national symbol. Time magazine's website ran a critical article headlined "This Indonesian Nazi Video Is One of the Worst Pieces of Political Campaigning Ever". Prabowo thanked Dhani, saying, "This video is boosting our fighting spirit!" However, there were rumors that Dhani was struck by Prabowo for his controversial music video, during a visit to the presidential candidate's residence.

On 23 June 2014, a Twitter post allegedly by Dhani stated that he would "cut off his penis" if presidential contender Joko Widodo and his running mate, former vice president Jusuf Kalla won the election. Dhani later claimed he never made the tweet and filed complaints against online media outlets that carried news of the defamatory tweet.

=== Legal issues ===
In September 2016, after undergoing a drug test while running for office as the deputy regent of Bekasi, Dhani said he had used drugs, including heroin, in the 1990s because, he claimed, Indonesia at that time did not have a law prohibiting drugs. Indonesia's 1976 Narcotics Law prohibited the production, trafficking, storage, and personal use of narcotics without permission from the Health Minister. Indonesia subsequently issued a revised anti-narcotics law in 1997.

On 2 December 2016, Dhani was arrested at a Jakarta hotel on suspicion of involvement in an alleged plot to overthrow the government. He was released a day later but remained a suspect over alleged defamation of the president.

=== Hate speech convictions and imprisonment ===
In March 2017, Dhani posted on Twitter: "Siapa saja yg dukung Penista Agama adalah Bajingan yg perlu di ludahi muka nya" (English: "whoever supports the blasphemer is a bastard who needs to be spat in the face"). The tweet was a reference to supporters of Jakarta Governor Basuki Tjahaja 'Ahok' Purnama, who was standing for re-election while on trial for insulting Islam. In November 2017, South Jakarta Police declared Dhani a suspect for hate speech. Dhani said he has never felt guilty. "In the examination I admitted that I hate those who defend religious blasphemers, I hate those who blaspheme religion, I also hate corruptors, rapists and drug dealers" he said. His trial commenced in April 2018 at South Jakarta District Court. On 28 January 2019, he was found guilty of hate speech and sentenced to one year and six months in jail. Prosecutors had recommended a two-year jail sentence. After the conclusion of his trial, he was sent to Jakarta's Cipinang jail. His lawyer Hendarsam Marantoko said he would appeal the verdict, which he described as an act of revenge for the jailing of Ahok.

In a separate case, Surabaya District Court in East Java province on 11 June 2019 sentenced Dhani to one year in jail for referring to his political rivals as "idiots" in an online post. The court ruled he had violated Article 27, Clause 3, of the Information and Electronic Transactions Law. The one-year sentence was reduced to three months and a six-month suspended sentence on appeal. Dhani was released from Cipinang jail on 30 December 2019. His colleague Lieus Sungkharisma said Dhani's release was thanks to Prabowo Subianto, who was appointed defense minister while Dhani was jailed. Dhani said he would continue to support Prabowo's presidential aspirations.

=== LGBT views ===
Ahmad Dhani once gave a statement that he supports LGBT and will legalize same-sex marriage if he is elected president. However, he later changed his statement. He even forbade his son to study in London for fear of homosexuality. He equated LGBT with rape, saying that LGBT people would drug his son and rape him.
