= Sergap (TV program) =

Indonesian criminal news program

- Presented by: See Presenters
- Theme music composer: Dhani Vicky Rinaldi
- Country of origin: Indonesia
- Original language: Indonesian

Production
- Production location: Jakarta
- Running time: 30 minutes

Original release
- Network: RCTI (2001-2011, 2018-2025) iNews (2018-2025)
- Release: 2 October 2001 – 28 February 2025

Related
- Indonesia Today; Seputar Peristiwa; Realita (iNews); Lapor Polisi (iNews)

Sergap is a criminal news program that aired on RCTI and rerun on iNews in Indonesia. This criminal news program was launched on 2 October 2001 and broadcasts criminal news that happens every day.

== History ==
At the beginning, Sergap RCTI was broadcast twice a week Everyday at 11.00-11.30 WIB. In 2003 Sergap Siang RCTI increased the broadcast frequency to seven times a week while moving broadcast time from 12.30 to 13.00 WIB after the RCTI Bulletin Siang program. On 6 June 2005, due to RCTI's Nuansa Pagi program airing Everyday at 05.00 to 06.30 WIB, RCTI introduced the Sergap Pagi program which aired from 06.30 to 07.00 WIB. with different segments with the RCTI Afternoon Pass with the entry of the Halte Sergap segment. Sergap Pagi RCTI was stopped on 31 July 2007 due to poor ratings. On 31 December 2017, the Sergap Siang RCTI officially ended and was replaced by Seputar Peristiwa. On 1 January 2018, Sergap aired again on RCTI after Seputar iNews Pagi.

== Segments ==
Sergap itself consists of five segments:

- Ungkap - This segment contains the latest criminal and legal news.
- Bidik - This segment explores more deeply about a story whose material is considered strong.
- Justisia - Interactive dialogue around criminal issues.
- Galeri - Feature or story of police officers.
- Top Viral (2018–present) - Trending topics of the day.

=== Bang Napi ===
Sergap has also a unique segment, the Bang Napi segment portrayed by Arie Hendrosaputro (sometimes played by Siswanto). On 29 June 2009 there was an episode of Bang Napi Lepas at the end of the segment with Abu Marlo and only a few seconds Bang Napi escaped and returned to prison again. In this segment, Bang Napi delivered messages relating to the news that had been delivered. Bang Napi usually convey a credo at the end of the message, which reads: "Kejahatan tidak selalu terjadi hanya karena niat pelakunya, tetapi juga kesempatan. Waspadalah, waspadalah!" (English: "Because The Criminal not always happens only because the intention of culprit, But there is a chance, Beware! Beware!").

== See also ==
- Indonesia Today
- Seputar Peristiwa
- Realita

== Timeslot list ==
- 05.00 WIB - 05.30 WIB Everyday (RCTI)
- 23.30 WIB - 00.00 WIB Everyday (INews)
- 09.30 WIB - 10.00 WIB Everyday (INews)
