= MNC =

MNC may refer to:

== Places ==
- Markinch railway station, Fife, Scotland, National Rail station code
- Monaco, UNDP country code
- Museo Nacional de las Culturas, a museum in Mexico City, Mexico
- Manchester City F.C., a football club in England

== Language ==
- Manchu language

== Business ==
- Multinational corporation
- MNC Asia Holding, an Indonesian conglomerate
  - Media Nusantara Citra, the corporation media subsidiary
    - MNC Channels, network of pay television channels
      - MNC Channel, former channel
      - MNC News, former name of Sindonews TV
      - MNC Sports, former name of Sportstars
      - MNC World News, former channel
    - MNC Trijaya FM, radio network
    - MNC Vision, pay television provider
    - MNCTV, terrestrial television network
- Merle Norman Cosmetics, American cosmetic company
- Monde Nissin Corporation, Philippine food and beverage company
- Mongolian News Channel, Mongolian TV broadcaster

== Technology ==
- Mobile network code
- Medicina Northern Cross, a radio telescope at Medicina Radio Observatory

== Other uses ==
- Métis National Council
- Mouvement National Congolais
- Mythical national championship
- Monday Night Combat
- Monday Night Countdown
