= ATVSI =

Indonesian broadcasting organization

Indonesian Private Televisions Association
- Asosiasi Televisi Swasta Indonesia
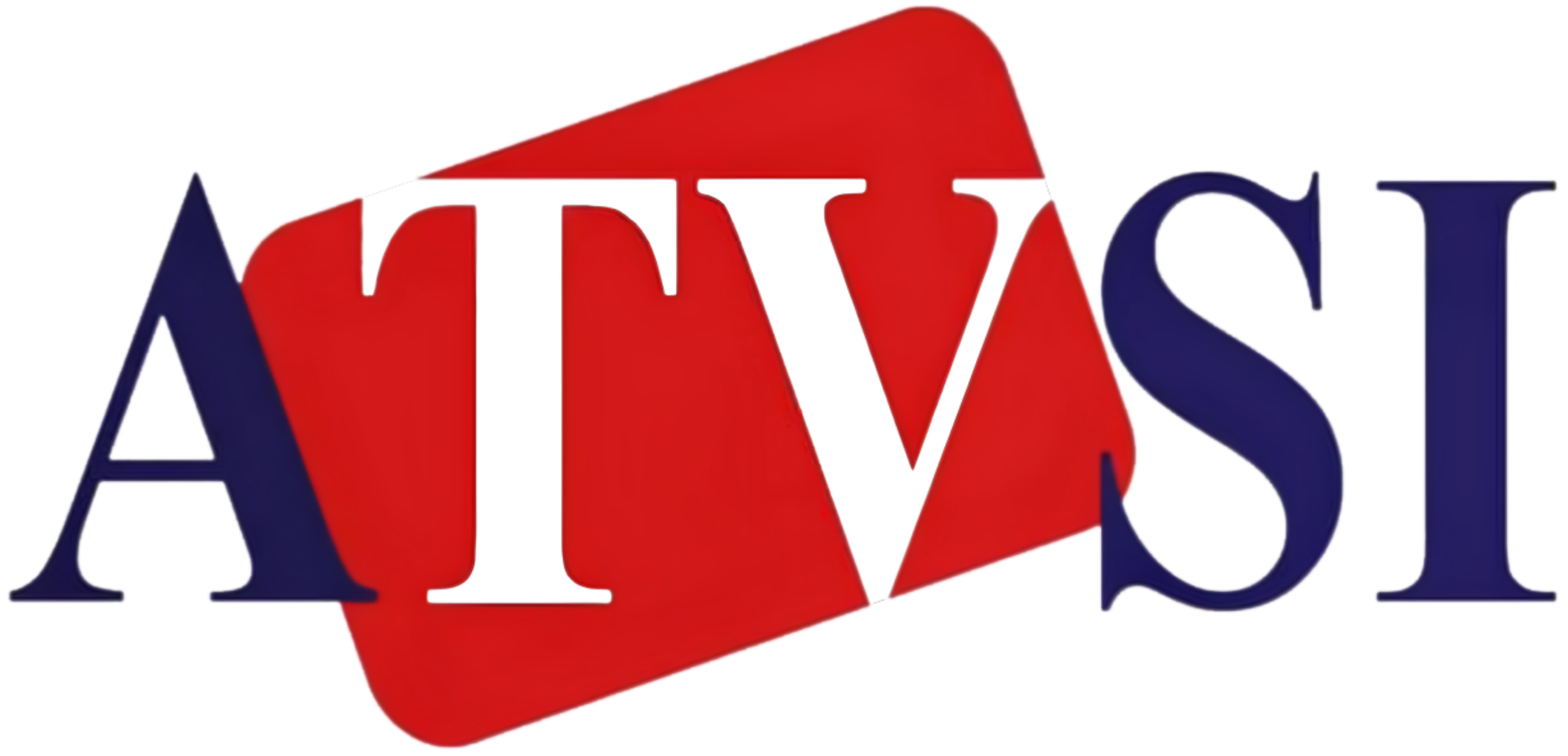
- Abbreviation: ATVSI
- Formation: 1997 as Forum TV Swasta; 4 August 2000; 26 years ago
- Headquarters: Plaza Marein floor 23 (Penthouse); Jalan Jenderal Sudirman kav.76-78, Setiabudi, South Jakarta, Jakarta
- Region served: Indonesia
- Members: See Members
- Official language: Indonesian
- Website: atvsi.or.id
- Formerly called: Forum TV Swasta (founded 1 August 1996)

ATVSI (Indonesian: Asosiasi Televisi Swasta Indonesia, lit. 'Indonesian Private Televisions Association') is an organization that unites the national commercial television networks in Indonesia.

== History ==
=== 1997-2000: The Establishment of TVSNI ===
The Pioneer of ATVSI at the new Order era, was the National TV Station that existed in this time such as RCTI, SCTV, TPI, ANteve and Indosiar agreed to form Televisi Swasta Nasional Indonesia (English: Indonesian National Private Television) as the place of communicate and coordinate for common interests as the Industry of Television. The Born of TVSNI nursed by Dewi Fajar (TPI), Harry Kuntoro (RCTI), Soeastomo Soepardji (Indosiar), Anton Nangoy (ANteve) and Agus Mulyanto (SCTV)

=== 2000-2018: The Establishment of ATVSI ===
Post reform era, after several meetings, then matured the formation of an association. On August 4, 2000, it was formed as 'ATVSI (Asosiasi Televisi Swasta Indonesia)' (English: Indonesian Private Television Association), by representatives of five National TV Stations, namely RCTI, SCTV, TPI, ANteve and Indosiar. The founders put the agreement in the meeting signed all by participants who attended among others, contended will be made AD/ART and formed by management organization ATVSI such as chairman and general secretary. Therefore, ATVSI it is legal. The chairman was elected for the first time as the Anton Nangoy (ANteve) and General Secretary was Soeastomo Soepardji (Indosiar) For term of office 2000-2003, and the first staff was Wida Wahyu Widyawati.

Along with time, as of year 2002, then the membership of National TV Station was tenth National TV Station such as RCTI, SCTV, TPI (now MNCTV), Indosiar, antv, Metro TV, Trans TV, TV7 (now Trans7), Lativi (now tvOne), and Global TV (now GTV)

As the administrators year 2003-2006 and 2006-2010, was Karni Ilyas (SCTV), and Zsa Zsa Yusharyahya (Metro TV) as general secretary. For 2006-2010 period was Nurhadi Poerwosapoetro (Indosiar) as general secretary. In Karni Ilyas period made some changes, and the name of Televisi Swasta Nasional Indonesia changes into Asosiasi Televisi Swasta Indonesia'. For management, other chairman of commission, also equipped as executive director, such as Uni Lubis (ANTV) and executive secretary Gilang Iskandar (RCTI)

Erick Thohir from tvOne was elected as the chairman ATVSI from year 2010-2013 and 2013-2015 or the third chairman. In the general meeting of ATVSI members on 10 November 2010, Erick Thohir as the chairman with general secretary as Warnedy (Trans TV)

Ishadi SK from Trans Media elected as the ATVSI chairman year 2015-2018, or the fourth chairman. In the general meeting of ATVSI members on 4 June 2015, Ishadi SK elected with representatives, Syafril Nasution (RCTI), Drs. Imam Soedjarwo (Indosiar), and general secretary Suryopratomo (Metro TV).

=== 2019-present: Digital Era ===
For 2019-2022 period, Chairman of ATVSI was Syafril Nasution from RCTI and the representatives Don Bosco Selamun (Metro TV), and General Secretary Gilang Iskandar (SCTV) and Chief Treasurer was Suswati Handayani (Trans7), The Election was doing in General Meeting ATVSI Member on November 7, 2019, in Financial Club, Graha CIMB Niaga, Senayan, Kebayoran Baru, Jakarta Selatan

== Members ==
Television	Address	Website	Parent
RCTI	MNC Studios, Jl. Raya Perjuangan No. 1, Kebon Jeruk, Jakarta Barat, Jakarta	rcti.tv	MNC Media
SCTV	SCTV Tower, Senayan City, Jl. Asia Afrika Lot. 19, Gelora, Tanah Abang, Jakarta Pusat, Jakarta	sctv.co.id	Emtek (via SCM)
MNCTV	MNC Studios, Jl. Raya Perjuangan No. 1, Kebon Jeruk, Jakarta Barat, Jakarta	mnctv.com	MNC Media
antv	The Convergence Indonesian Building Lt.26-28, Kawasan Rasuna Epicentrum, Jl. H.R. Rasuna Said, Karet Kuningan, Setiabudi, Jakarta Selatan, Jakarta	an.tv	VIVA (via MDIA)
Indosiar	Jl. Damai 11 RT 004/05, Duri Kepa, Kebon Jeruk, Jakarta Barat, Jakarta	indosiar.com	Emtek (via SCM)
MetroTV	Gedung Media Group, Jl. Pilar Mas Raya Kav.A-D, Kedoya Selatan, Kebon Jeruk, Jakarta Barat, Jakarta	metrotvnews.com	Media Group
Trans TV	Gedung Trans Media, Jl. Kapten P. Tendean Kav. 12-14 A, Mampang Prapatan, Jakarta Selatan, Jakarta	transtv.co.id	Trans Media
Trans7	Gedung Trans Media, Jl. Kapten P. Tendean Kav. 12-14 A, Mampang Prapatan, Jakarta Selatan, Jakarta	trans7.co.id	Trans Media
tvOne	Kawasan Industri Pulo Gadung JIEP, Jl. Rawa Terate 2, Jatinegara, Cakung, Jakarta Timur, Jakarta	tvonenews.com	VIVA
GTV	MNC Studios, Jl. Raya Perjuangan No. 1, Kebon Jeruk, Jakarta Barat, Jakarta	gtv.id	MNC Media
MDTV	MD Place Tower, Jl. Setiabudi Selatan No. 7, Jakarta Selatan	mdtelevision.com	MDTV Media

== ATVSI Administrators ==
- Anton Nangoy (2000–2003)
- Karni Ilyas (2003–2010)
- Erick Thohir (2010–2015)
- Ishadi S.K. (2015–2019)
- Syafril Nasution (2019–2023)
- Imam Sudjarwo (2023–sekarang)

== Public Service Advertisement by ATVSI ==
- Bangun Pemudi Pemuda (by All Star Indonesian Artist & Athlete, 2016, Trans TV, Trans7 & CNN Indonesia Version)
- Bagimu Negeri (2016, Metro TV Version, remake of PSA SEA Games 1995)
- Cintai Indonesiamu (2016, ANTV Version)
- Virus Corona Bukan Untuk Ditakuti (2020, Trans TV Version)
- Social Distancing (2020, RCTI Version)
