= MNC World News =

Indonesian TV news channel

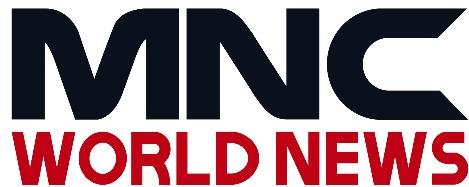
- Final logo, which is a revision of 2015 logo, used from 2016 to 2017
- Country: Indonesia
- Broadcast area: Indonesia; International
- Network: MNC Vision; MNC Media
- Headquarters: Gedung MNC Tower Lt. 2 Jalan Kebon Sirih Raya No. 17-19, Kebon Sirih, Jakarta

Programming
- Language: English
- Picture format: 576i 4:3 SDTV; 1080i 16:9 HDTV

Ownership
- Owner: MNC Channels
- Sister channels: MNC News; IDX Channel; MNC Channel

History
- Launched: 17 August 2015 in Jakarta, Indonesia
- Closed: 7 August 2017

Links
- Website: www.mncchannels.com

MNC World News was an international news TV channel 24 hours in English. MNC World News can be watched via the channel 85. MNC Media MNC Vision in World News is the first English-language television channel in the Channels MNC Media MNC Vision. For now, MNC World News can only be captured in a subscription television network belonging to MNC Media like MNC Vision, and MNC Play Media. In the future targeted MNC World News channel will be available in a variety of satellite and cable television worldwide in 2020 but the target was not reached.

== Programmes ==
- World Hour
- World Hour Weekend
- Daybreak
- Screenshot
- The Marketplace
- Glimpse from the Past
- Top 5 Current Issues
- Showbiz Central
- Raising the Bar
- Special Dialogue

== Presenters ==
- Tommy Tjokro (previously on MetroTV and Bloomberg TV Indonesia, is also working as an announcer for RCTI)
- Juanita Wiratmadja (previously on Global TV, SCTV, Kompas TV and VOA Indonesia, then to CNBC Indonesia, now on TVRI World)
- Roberlin Purba (previously on MetroTV)
- Krishna Sam
- Togi Sinaga (also on MNC News)
- Karina Tasya
- Irsan Karim (now on CNN Indonesia)
- Dirza Prakoso (previously on MNC News, now on SEA Today)
- Amelia Yachya (previously on Global TV and MNC News, then to CNN Indonesia, now not working on any television network )
- Nicole Shiraz (previously on Fox Sports Australia, iNews TV and MNC Sports)
- Emelli Putri (previously on MNC News)

== MNC World News Network ==
Broadcast MNC World News can be seen on MNC Vision, and MNC Play Media.
