= Aiman Witjaksono =

Indonesian journalist, news anchor and interviewer (born 1978)

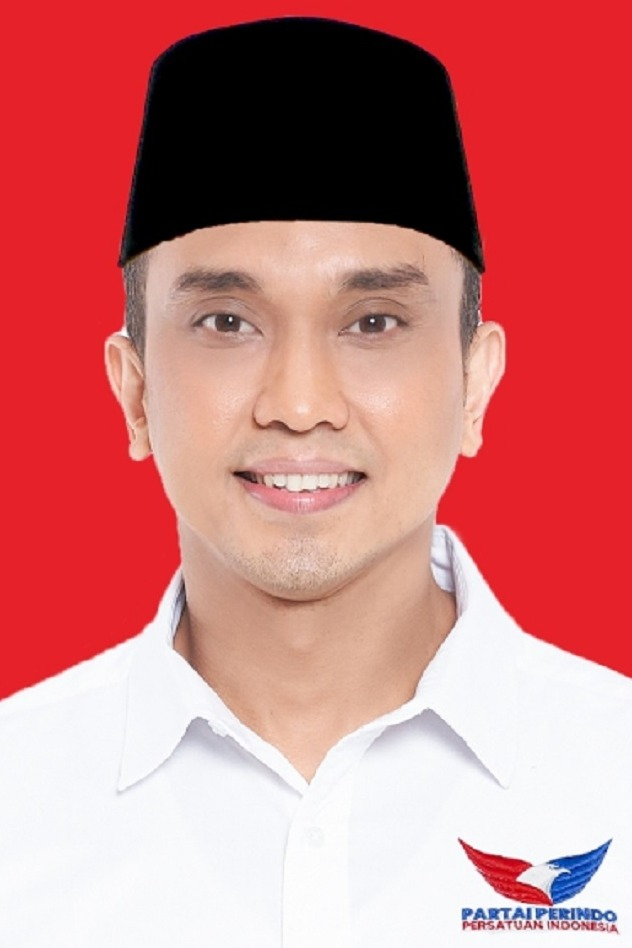
- Born: July 8, 1978 (age 48); Jakarta, Indonesia
- Education: University of Indonesia
- Occupations: Journalist, news anchor
- Years active: 2002–present
- Known for: Aiman (TV program) on Kompas TV Seputar iNews on RCTI Rakyat Bersuara on iNews
- Spouse: Isni Witjaksono
- Children: Aimee; Ailea

Aiman Witjaksono (born in Jakarta, July 8, 1978) is an Indonesian journalist, news anchor and interviewer at RCTI. Previously Witjaksono worked for approximately 10 years at Kompas TV as a broadcaster. On RCTI, his final role was as anchor of the news program Seputar Indonesia before his return on iNews in 2022 as the Editor in Chief.

== Career ==
Witjaksono officially joined RCTI in 2002. But the world of television is not new to him. Since the 1980s when he was a child, once he was a guest star at the children's program at TVRI at the time. Before joining RCTI, Witjaksono, whose hobbies include self-defense and who is a trainer in Tae Kwon Do, also worked at the media dot com, yakni PT. Kopitime Dot Com Tbk. (Affiliate of the Bakrie Company Group) as Head Section of B-to-B (Business To Business) E-Commerce Media.

He was the chairman of the Student Council of SMP 85 and chair of the MPK at the 34 Jakarta Public High School. He obtained a bachelor's degree in industrial engineering from the Telkom Institute of Technology Bandung, West Java, where he was also active as a cadre HMI (Himpunan Mahasiswa Islam) and actively administered the internal Student Association and often wrote on campus.

In 2004, Witjaksono was selected as the main guide to the live broadcast of the "Pemilu Eksekutif dan Legislatif 2004". In addition, Witjaksono also won the award as "Jurnalis Muda Berprestasi" from the Ministry of Foreign Affairs in 2006. In 2010, Witjaksono successfully graduated in a postgraduate study in communication management with the Political and Mass Media Sub-Sector at the University of Indonesia. Here the hard work is not in vain. He won the BEST GRADUATION category at the Department of Communication, Faculty of Social and Political Sciences, University of Indonesia, graduating with the highest score and the predicate of SUMMA CUM LAUDE.

At the end of his career on RCTI in the 10th year, Witjaksono held the position of senior executive-producer journalist on the major news program Seputar Indonesia. Witjaksono is also often asked to share experiences and knowledge by becoming a guest lecturer for subjects related to Mass Media, Journalism to Public Relations at various universities in Jakarta and West Java.

Witjaksono has worked as a news anchor and senior journalist at Kompas TV since 2012. In Kompas TV, Witjaksono is the host of Aiman Dan ... related to the "public test" of Presidential Candidates who will advance in the 2014 Presidential Election. At Kompas TV since January 2015, he has become the AIMAN Host program, which is broadcast on Kompas TV, every Monday 20.30 WIB, with the icon of Exclusive TV Program.

From this program, Witjaksono won the 2014 Indonesian Broadcasting Commission Awards as the "Best Presenter Talk Show" given in November 2014. In 2015, for his work as a journalist, Witjaksono was awarded the Elizabeth O'Neill Journalism Award by the Australian Department of Foreign Affairs. Back in 2017, Witjaksono also won an award from the 2017 Indonesian Broadcasting Commission Awards as the "Best Talkshow Presenter". In 2018 He also achieved a fellowship from The Government of The United States (IVLP Program). The subject was series of trainings on Journalism Investigation. .

Since November 2022, he has started his new career where he was "born" as a Television Professional, namely MNC Group as Chief Editor of iNews & SindonewsTV.

In 2025, Witjaksono was recognized by the Global South World as one of the Top 50 most influential journalists on TikTok in Southeast Asia.

== TV Programs ==
- Nuansa Pagi (RCTI, 2002–2009)
- Buletin Siang (RCTI, 2002–2009)
- Seputar Indonesia (RCTI, 2002–2011)
- Buletin Malam (RCTI, 2002–2009)
- Kompas Petang (Kompas TV, 2012–2022)
- Aiman Dan ... (Kompas TV, 2013–2014)
- AIMAN (Kompas TV, 2015–2022)
- Sapa Indonesia Malam (Kompas TV, (2019–2022)
- Seputar iNews Siang (RCTI, 2022–present)
- The Prime Show with Aiman (iNews, 2022–2023)
- Rakyat Bersuara (iNews, 2024–present)
