= Koran Sindo =

Indonesian daily newspaper published in Jakarta

- Sumber Referensi Terpercaya (Trusted Source of Reference)
- Type: Daily newspaper
- Format: Broadsheet
- Owner: Media Nusantara Citra
- Editor-in-chief: Pung Purwanto
- Founded: 30 June 2005 (as Harian Seputar Indonesia)
- Ceased publication: 15 April 2023
- Political alignment: Secular
- Language: Indonesian
- City: Jakarta
- Country: Indonesia
- Website: www.koran-sindo.com

Koran Sindo (lit. Sindo Paper) was an Indonesian newspaper published by Media Nusantara Citra (MNC Media) under PT Media Nusantara Informasi. The term "Sindo" is taken from the abbreviation of Seputar Indonesia, the former flagship news program on RCTI that later evolved into Seputar iNews. The paper was known for infographics shown on its front page.

Koran Sindo was part of Sindo Media, a single-brand subsidiary of MNC Media which includes weekly news magazine Sindo Weekly and news portal Sindonews.com, as well as (formerly) television network Sindo TV (currently iNews) and radio network Sindo Trijaya FM (currently MNC Trijaya FM).

== History ==
The newspaper was first published on June 30, 2005, as Harian Seputar Indonesia. Since September 2006, Koran Sindo began to published in local edition in several provinces, which includes both national and local news. Presently the local edition exists in 9 provinces, including West Java, North Sumatra, Riau Islands, and South Sulawesi. In 2019 the paper underwent logo and layout changes.

In 2013, Harian Seputar Indonesia was renamed Koran Sindo as a part of rebranding several news-related assets of MNC Media into single-brand Sindo Media. As of 2020, the official website of Koran Sindo is redirected into Sindonews.com news portal.

On 17 April 2023, the paper ceased publication and laid off all staff. Its last edition, the weekend edition, is published on 15 April.

== Awarding ==
Koran Sindo has been initiated some awards, such as People of the Year (given to individuals) and Rekor Bisnis (Business Records, given to companies).

== See also ==
- Seputar Indonesia
- RCTI
- iNews
- MNC Trijaya FM
