= Peter F. Gontha =

Indonesian businessman

Peter Frans Gontha

Ambassador of Indonesia to Poland
- In office 15 October 2014 – 7 January 2019
- President: Susilo Bambang Yudhoyono; Joko Widodo
- Preceded by: Darmansjah Djumala
- Succeeded by: Siti Nugraha Mauludiah

Personal details
- Born: 4 May 1948 (age 77) Semarang, Indonesia
- Party: NasDem Party
- Spouse: Purnama Purba
- Children: Francois; Dewi

Peter Frans Gontha (born 4 May 1948 in Semarang, Indonesia) is an Indonesian businessman, commercial television pioneer, and jazz musician. He served as Indonesian ambassador to Poland from October 2014 to January 2019.

== Early life and education ==
Gontha was born in Semarang, Central Java, to Victor Willem ‘Wim’ Gontha and Alice. After attending Jakarta's Kanisius College, he was in 1967 sent by his mother to the Netherlands, where he worked as a driver for the Indonesian Embassy and for Garuda Indonesia in Amsterdam. He also found employment as a sailor and worked for the Holland-America Line cruise company. After saving $9,000, he returned to Indonesia. In 1970, he started work for Shell Benelux Computer Center. Shell provided him with a scholarship to study accounting at the Praehep Institute in the Netherlands. He received his degree in Finance Accounting and Business Administration in 1972.

== Career ==
From 1975 to 1979, Gontha worked for Citibank N.A., where he became assistant vice president. He later became vice president of American Express Bank for Asia. In Indonesia, he was vice president of Bimantara Citra Group, a conglomerate founded in 1981 by Bambang Trihatmodjo (former president Suharto’s middle son) and Indra Rukmana (TPI's founder and Tutut Suharto's husband), as well as with their partner Rosano Barack and Mochammad Tachril Sapi'ie.

Gontha founded Indonesia’s first commercial television network, Rajawali Citra Televisi Indonesia (RCTI), in 1989 as part of Bimantara Group. He developed the network's image through quality programming, such as the news and current affairs show Seputar Jakarta (later renamed Seputar Indonesia), which was modeled on the style of CNN's news programs. Gontha co-founded Indonesia's second commercial television network, Surya Citra Televisi (SCTV) in 1990, followed by satellite pay TV company Indovision in 1994. Gontha was a shareholder and spokesman for PT Matahari Lintas Cakrawala (Malicak), which persuaded the government to allow CNN and ESPN to start broadcasting in Indonesia in mid-1992, despite initially facing opposition from the Information Ministry.

In 1996, Gontha purchased a controlling stake in the English-language daily newspaper, The Indonesian Observer and developed SCTV's news and current affairs show Liputan 6. His media empire and ambitions earned him the nickname, "the Rupert Murdoch of Indonesia".

Gontha was a co-founder of petrochemical firm PT Chandra Asri Indonesia. His other business ventures included Plaza Indonesia Realty (The Grand Hyatt Jakarta), PT Tri Polyta Indonesia, First Media (formerly known as PT Broadband Multimedia Tbk, PT Tanjung Bangun Semesta Tbk, PT Safira Ananda, PT Aditirta Indonusa and Kabelvision), Bali Intercontinental Resort, PT Datakom Asia and PT Jaring Data Interaktif (then owner of Q Channel that later evolved into BTV).

The 1997-98 Asian financial crisis resulted in Gontha leaving RCTI. In 2001, he shut down The Indonesian Observer and stepped down from PT Datakom Asia, the holding company that own a stake in SCTV, PT Cipta Aneka Selaras, Indovision, Kabelvision and TelkomVision. His departure from Datakom was attributed to a power struggle between Gontha and then-emerging media tycoon Hary Tanoesoedibjo, as well as differences of opinion with SCTV co-owner Henry Pribadi.

Gontha's public profile increased when he began hosting an Indonesian version of The Apprentice in 2005 aired on Indosiar, leading to him being dubbed "the Indonesian Donald Trump". Gontha, who is known for his baldness, has dismissed the comparison as nonsense, saying he is just a hard worker who looks nothing like Trump.

Gontha is the founder of the annual Jakarta International Java Jazz Festival, which was first held in 2005 and has attracted top jazz acts from around the world. His love of jazz stemmed from his father, who was a trumpeter for a jazz band at Shell oil company in Surabaya, East Java.

On 15 October 2014, Gontha was appointed Indonesian Ambassador to Poland by president Susilo Bambang Yudhoyono. On 11 December 2018, Gontha received Commander's Cross of the Order of Merit of the Republic of Poland from President Andrzej Duda in recognition of his contribution to bilateral relations. On 7 January 2019, Indonesian President Joko Widodo appointed Siti Nugraha Mauludiah as Indonesian ambassador to Poland, replacing Gontha.

In 2019, Gontha started presenting the Impact talk show on CNBC Indonesia. In January 2020, he was named a commissioner of national airline Garuda Indonesia. He had previously served as a commissioner of Garuda from 2011 to 2014.

=== Politics and organizations ===
Gontha has said that during the Suharto era, then-information minister Harmoko invited him to join the ruling political body, Golkar, but he declined as he preferred to remain focused on business. He said his cousin, Theo Sambuaga, a prominent Golkar figure, also invited him to join. After Suharto's presidency ended in 1998, Gontha was invited by Frans Seda to join the Indonesian Democratic Party of Struggle (PDIP) but he declined, even though his parents had been close to Seda's family. In 2007, when Jusuf Kalla became chairman of Golkar, he urged Gontha to join the party. Gontha agreed, on the condition he would not have a membership card, as he did not want to be seen as a politician. He lasted only two months in the party. He later used his Golkar connections to help politician Basuki 'Ahok' Tjahaja Purnama join the party, although Ahok later left Golkar in order to join Gerindra Party and run for the deputy governorship of Jakarta. On 9 February 2019, after completing his term as ambassador to Poland, Gontha met in Surabaya with his close friend, media tycoon Chairul Tanjung, and fellow media tycoon Surya Paloh. Paloh asked Gontha to join his NasDem Party, which is part of President Joko Widodo's ruling coalition. Gontha and Paloh had been friends since they were teenagers, as their fathers had served together in a police agency. However, the friendship between Gontha and Paloh had at times faced obstacles related to family and business. Gontha eventually decided to join Nasdem, saying he respected Paloh's strong commitment to upholding Indonesia's nationalism and diversity. In November 2019, Gontha resigned from the Honorary Council of the Indonesian Journalists Association (PWI) as he had joined Nasdem's Council of Experts.

== Family and personal life ==
Although born in the Central Java capital of Semarang, Gontha is a member of the Minahasan ethnic group, native to North Sulawesi, as his parents hailed from there. Gontha is a nephew of Hubert Rudy Gontha, who was a senior diplomat with the Indonesian Foreign Affairs Ministry, serving as Indonesian Consul to Singapore in the 1960s and as Indonesian Representative to the 5th Committee of the UN General Assembly in 1972.

Gontha married Purnama Purba on 20 September 1969. They have two children, Francois and Dewi, and five grandchildren. Gontha is a motorcycling enthusiast.
