= Buletin Siang =

- Created by: Desi Anwar
- Starring: Dana Iswara, Atika Suri
- Country of origin: Indonesia
- Original language: Indonesian

Production
- Production location: Jakarta
- Camera setup: Multicamera setup
- Running time: 30 minutes

Original release
- Network: RCTI 1991–2009; SCTV 1991–1996
- Release: 1 January 1991 – 8 February 2009

Related
- Seputar Indonesia Siang

Buletin Siang (lit. Daytime Bulletin) was the first daytime newscast ever produced by an Indonesian private television network. It was launched on 1 January 1991 on the privately owned RCTI television network in Indonesia. The program was also carried by RCTI's then sister network, SCTV.

On 9 February 2009, all news programs on RCTI were renamed under the revamped Seputar Indonesia brand, now called Satu Seputar Indonesia (One Around Indonesia), at which point Buletin Siang was renamed Seputar Indonesia Siang (Around Indonesia Daytime).

Buletin Siang was regularly aired every day at 12:00 PM Western Indonesian Time, but in the 1990s, sometimes the newscast often shifted earlier due to Formula One live race programming in the daytime.

== Logo history ==
The Buletin Siang logo was originally a purple square containing the words BULETIN SIANG and an orange circle with a narrow triangle. This logo was used from 1 January 1991 until 31 July 1999.

From 1 August 1999 until 31 August 2003 the Buletin Siang logo was a blue and white circle surrounding a narrow blue triangle.

From 1 September 2003 until 31 July 2006 the Buletin Siang logo used 3D graphics.

On 1 August 2006, the logo was changed to that of Seputar Indonesia, which was used until 9 February 2009.

== Segments ==
- Buletin Wanita (1993–2006)
- Wajah (1993–2006)

== Anchors ==
- Ida Parwati
- Zsa Zsa Yusharyahya
- Desi Anwar
- Dana Iswara
- Atika Suri
- Nova Poerwadi
- Ratna Komala
- Fetty Fadjriati
- Crysanti Soewarso
- Fauziah Dasuki
- Devi Trianna
- Chandra Sugarda - Nazir
- Yulia Supadmo
- Catharina Davy
- Inne Sudjono
- Ria Yusnita
- Marcellina Ika
- Aiman Witjaksono
- Putra Nababan
- Gustav Aulia
- Dentamira Kusuma
- Chantal Della Concetta
- Joice Triatman
- Isyana Bagoes Oka
- Michael Tjandra

== See also ==
- Nuansa Pagi
- Buletin Malam
