= Helmi Johannes =

Indonesian television newscaster (born 1961)

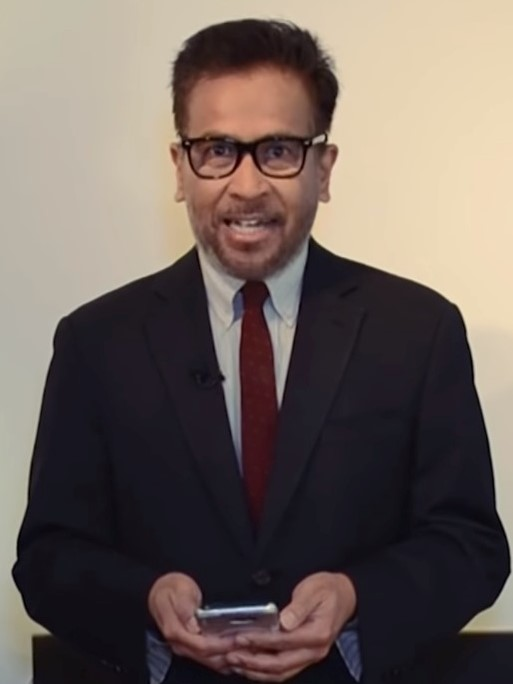
- Helmi Johannes in May 2020
- Born: 23 March 1961 (age 65); Yogyakarta, Indonesia
- Education: Gadjah Mada University, B.A., 1987
- Occupation: Television Journalist
- Notable credits: RCTI anchor (1989–2000); Metro TV anchor (2000–2005); VOA Indonesia executive producer (2005–present)
- Website: www.voanews.com/indonesian/Helmi-Johannes.cfm

Helmi Johannes (born 23 March 1961) is an Indonesian television newscaster and executive producer. Helmi Johannes now works for the Indonesian service of the Voice of America (VOA), based in Washington, DC. Helmi is responsible for the overall production, program development, talent and day-to-day operations of VOA Indonesian television programming.

== Biography ==
Helmi Johannes was born in Yogyakarta, Indonesia, the son of Herman Johannes, an Indonesian professor and a former rector of the Gadjah Mada University. In the 1950s his father moved from Rote Island to Yogyakarta on Java Island where his father rose to local prominence as an educator and one of the founders of the Gadjah Mada University; and a thoroughfare connecting the business area of Yogyakarta and the university campus is named in his honor.

Helmi Johannes spent all his school years in Yogyakarta and attended the SMA 1 Teladan High School in the Wirobrajan area of the city. He was attracted to radio communications and became an amateur radio when he was a teenager but he then attended the architectural engineering faculty at the Gadjah Mada University before turning to journalism.

== Career ==
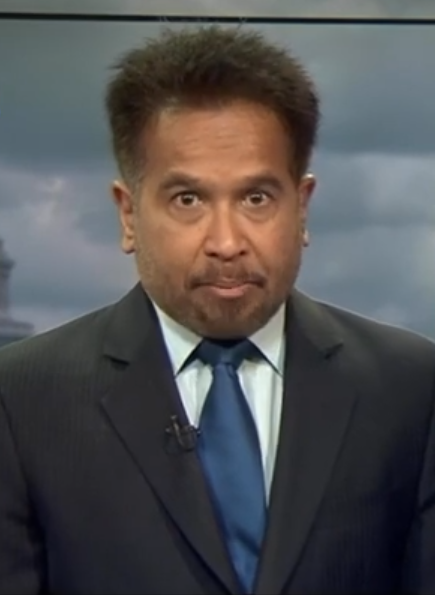
Helmi Johannes in September 2019.

Helmi Johannes started his career as a radio broadcaster for Geronimo FM based in Yogyakarta, before moving to Jakarta to join RCTI, the first private television network in Indonesia. In 1989, Helmi Johannes helped found Seputar Indonesia (then Seputar Jakarta), the first newscast ever carried by an Indonesian private station. During his career with RCTI, Helmi Johannes served as reporter, producer, newscaster and news production manager. Helmi had also produced Indonesia's first late-night newscast Buletin Malam (1991) and also Indonesia Today, the first English-language newscast aired by RCTI (1996–1999).

In 2000, Helmi Johannes helped established Metro TV in Jakarta and served as executive producer, news research & development manager and news services manager as well as newscaster (2000–2005). Metro TV is Indonesia's first 24-hour news channel founded by media tycoon Surya Paloh who also owns the Media Indonesia daily. There Helmi served as weekend anchor of the network's main evening newscast Metro Hari Ini and he also hosted Midnight Live, a mixture of talk show and live report on real-life issues.

As television reporter Helmi Johannes had covered the OPEC Meeting in Paris, France in 1991, the 1992 UN Earth Summit in Rio de Janeiro, Brazil, the Non-Aligned Movement Summit in Jakarta (1992) and the 1994 APEC Summit in Bogor, Indonesia. As an anchor in Indonesia Helmi Johannes had often been asked to speak in university workshops and also in parliament hearings.

In May 2005, Helmi Johannes moved to Washington to become the executive TV producer for the Indonesian Service of VOA. Helmi Johannes also anchors Laporan VOA (VOA Report), an Indonesian show that airs weekdays on Metro TV Jakarta. As an Indonesian Service reporter Helmi Johannes covered the election night at McCain Headquarters in Phoenix, Arizona.

Helmi Johannes has also become speakers in several discussions in Washington including on the State of Media in Indonesia: Ten Years after Soeharto.

== Awards, memberships ==
Helmi Johannes had been on the executing board of the Association of Indonesian Private Televisions (ATVSI) and was also the Secretary-General of KOMTEVE (Indonesian Television Community), a non-profit organization that promotes public control on television contents. He has been also a charter member of IJTI, the Indonesian Television Journalists Association. Helmi Johannes was the most favorite male news presenter in the people's choice poll conducted by Indonesia's Citra tabloid in 1994–1995. For 4 years in a row Helmi Johanes had also been nominated for the most favorite male newscaster of Panasonic Awards (1997 to 2000). Helmi Johannes was also one of the judges of the Asian Television Awards in 2001, 2002 and 2003.

== Famous interviews ==
Helmi Johannes has interviewed many important figures, such as Indonesian President Susilo Bambang Yudhoyono when he was coordinating minister for political and security affairs, Indonesian Vice President Jusuf Kalla, most of Indonesian cabinet ministers, former U.S. Secretary of State Colin Powell, and Indonesian marketing guru Hermawan Kartajaya.
