= Atika Suri =

Atika Suri (born Indragiri Hulu Regency, Riau; February 10, 1968) is an Indonesian TV newscaster and newscast producer.

== Education and training ==
Atika Suri graduated from the Design and Art Faculty of Trisakti University in Jakarta. During her career as a television journalist, Suri has attended several professional pieces of training including Peace Journalism from the BBC in 2001, CNN Television Workshop in October 2000, and TV News Production Workshops by Frank N. Magid Associates in 1995 and 1996.

== Career ==
Suri began her career as a reporter and news presenter for RCTI's morning show, Nuansa Pagi, in 1993. Since 1994, Suri had been assigned to report Indonesia's presidential activities including reporting overseas visits of former presidents Suharto and Abdurrahman Wahid. As a presidential correspondent, Suri conducted many live reports from overseas and also established networks with sources such as cabinet ministers and officials. Suri also did live reports during the Asia-Pacific Economic Cooperation (APEC) Leaders Meeting in Bogor, Indonesia in 1994, and covered the Meeting of 77 Heads of the 3rd World Countries, or G-77 Conference, in Havana, Cuba.

Atika Suri is now the news producer of RCTI's newscast, Buletin Siang, one of the news programs in Indonesia. Suri manages the production of the newscast, selects stories and arranges the rundown, writes news stories and lead-ins, copies-edits, and approves the scripts before editing and on-air. She also helps translate materials from news agencies and voices them into the Indonesian language.

Since 2004, Suri has been back to serve as the main anchor of RCTI’s morning newscast Nuansa Pagi along with co-anchor Ade Novit. She had also served as the main anchor of Buletin Siang, as well as the newscaster of Seputar Indonesia.

Atika Suri was nominated as the most favorite female news presenter at the Panasonic Awards in 2000.
