= VOA Indonesia =

VOA Indonesia may mean:-

- Voice Of America Indonesia - the radio service
- VOA Indonesia - the Visa On Arrival policy in Indonesia
