= Kedoya Utara =

- Administrative village
- Interactive map of Kedoya Utara
- Country: Indonesia
- Province: DKI Jakarta
- Regency: Jakarta
- Subdistrict: Kebon Jeruk

Area
  - Total: 3.15 km^{2} (1.22 sq mi)

Population
  - Total: 54,592
  - Density: 17,300/km^{2} (44,900/sq mi)
- Postal code: 11520

Kedoya Utara (Indonesian for North Kedoya) is an administrative village in the Kebon Jeruk district, city of West Jakarta, Indonesia. It has postal code of 11520, the same as Kedoya Selatan.

== See also ==
- Kebon Jeruk
- List of administrative villages of Jakarta
