= Indonesia Today =

Indonesia Today is the first English-language bespoke newscast information package TV programme ever carried by a private television network in Indonesia. It appeared on RCTI from 4 November 1996 to 31 August 2001. On 31 August 2001, Indonesia Today was discontinued due to lack of ratings and replaced by an Indonesian-language criminal information package, Sergap.

== News anchor ==
- Desi Anwar
- Crysanti Soewarso
- Jason Tedjasukmana
- Helmi Johannes
- Yulia Supadmo
- Nova Poerwadi

== Rubrication ==
- In Focus
- Business and Financial
- The Diplomatic Pouch
- Politic
- Law and Criminal
- Social
- Health and Medical
- International
- Art and culture
- Weather Forecast
- English Daily Newspaper (Morning Paper)
  - The Jakarta Post
  - Jakarta Straits Times
  - Jakarta Daily News
- Agenda
- Headline News
- World Sport

== Time slot history ==
- 07.00-08.00 WIB (1 November 1996 – 6 February 2000)
- 07.00-08.00 WIB (7 February 2000 – 31 August 2001)

== See also ==
- RCTI
