= OK TV (Indonesian TV channel) =

Indonesian pay television channel

- Broadcast area: Nationwide

Programming
- Language(s): Indonesian
- Picture format: 576i SDTV 4:3

Ownership
- Owner: MNC Media
- Parent: MNC Channels
- Sister channels: Celebrities TV; Ent; Okezone TV; Vision Prime

History
- Launched: 13 March 2020
- Replaced: MNC Channel
- Closed: 31 July 2024 (4 years, 4 months and 18 days)
- Replaced by: Food Travel

Links
- Website: www.mncchannels.com/micro/OK-TV

OK TV was an Indonesian general entertainment pay television channel owned by MNC Media.

OK TV launched on 13 March 2020, replacing MNC Channel, which was also broadcast outside of Indonesia. In addition to programming that aired on that channel, OK TV broadcast variety programs previously aired by GTV and MNCTV, as well as some religious programming and overflow soccer matches from the MNC Sports channels. OK TV ceased broadcasting and was replaced by Food Travel on 31 July 2024.
