= Ersa Siregar =

Indonesian journalist (1951–2003)

Sory Ersa Siregar
- Born: Sory Ersa Sutry Siregar; 4 December 1951; Brastagi, North Sumatra, Indonesia
- Died: 29 December 2003 (aged 52); Langsa, Aceh, Indonesia
- Resting place: Carang Pulang Cemetery, Legok, Tangerang Regency, Banten
- Other name: Ersa Siregar
- Education: Sekolah Tinggi Publisistik
- Occupation: Reporter for RCTI
- Years active: 1984–2003
- Employer: RCTI
- Television: Seputar Indonesia
- Title: Drs
- Spouse: Tuty Komala Bintang Hasibuan
- Children: Ridhwan Ermalamora Siregar Syawaluddin Ade Syahfitrah Siregar Meiliani Fauziah Siregar
- Parents: Baginda Majid Siregar (father); Asna Dewi Rambe (mother)
- Awards: UDIN Award

Sory Ersa Siregar (4 December 1951 – 29 December 2003) was an Indonesian journalist working for RCTI television network who was killed when covering the conflict in Aceh in 2003. He left a wife, Tuty Komala Bintang Hasibuan and three children, Ridhwan Siregar, Fitrah Siregar, dan Sarah Siregar.

Before working for RCTI in 1993, he had been working in PT. Fesda, PT. Satmarindo, Susana magazine, and Keluarga Magazine. Ersa started his career as a translator/producer, and then changed into the regional coordinator, then local coordinator (KorLip) covering tourism, lifestyle and entertainment. He also began to work as legal coordinator (KorBid), covering urban crime from 16 November 2001 until he was killed.

== Death ==
On 1 July 2003, he and his cameraman, Ferry Santoro, were reported missing in Langsa, East Aceh. On 5 July, their car was found in Langsa, East Aceh, an area well known for being GAM base. On 29 December, Siregar's body was found shot in Kuala Maniham, East Aceh.
