= Sukabumi Selatan =

- Administrative village
- Interactive map of Sukabumi Selatan
- Country: Indonesia
- Province: DKI Jakarta
- Regency: Jakarta
- Subdistrict: Kebon Jeruk

Area
  - Total: 1.57 km^{2} (0.61 sq mi)

Population
  - Total: 45,361
  - Density: 28,900/km^{2} (74,800/sq mi)
- Postal code: 11560

Sukabumi Selatan (Indonesian for South Sukabumi) is an administrative village in the Kebon Jeruk district, city of West Jakarta, Indonesia. It has postal code of 11560.

== See also ==
- Kebon Jeruk
- List of administrative villages of Jakarta
