= BTV (Indonesian TV channel) =

Indonesian television channel

- Current logo since 2025, an iteration of the 2022 logo
- Type: Television broadcaster
- Country: Indonesia
- Broadcast area: Nationwide
- Headquarters: Tokyo HUB PIK 2, Jl. Otista, Pantai Indah Kapuk 2, Tangerang, Banten, Indonesia

Programming
- Language: Indonesian
- Picture format: 1080i HDTV (downscaled to 16:9 576i for the SDTV feed)

Ownership
- Owner: B Universe
- Sister channels: BeritaSatu TV; Jakarta Globe

History
- Launched: 1 May 1998; (trial broadcast); 29 May 1998; (official broadcast; as Q Channel); 11 October 2022; (as BTV)
- Founder: Peter F. Gontha
- Former names: Q Channel (1998–2005); QTV (2005–2011); BeritaSatu (2011–2022)

Links
- Website: btv.id

Availability

Terrestrial
- Digital terrestrial television: Check local frequencies (in Indonesian language)

Streaming media
- IndiHome TV: Watch live (IndiHome customers only)
- Vidio: Watch live
- Vision+: Watch live (Subscription required, Indonesia only)
- MIVO: Watch live

BTV, a.k.a. formerly the Q Channel, QTV and BeritaSatu (literally translated as NewsOne) is an Indonesian digital free-to-air television network owned by B Universe. 80% of the stake is owned by former Minister of Trade, NasDem Party politician and businessman Enggartiasto Lukita. The channel is the first Indonesia-based pay television channel. It focused on news, sports and entertainment programming.

== History ==
Qtv logo, with the "Q" wordmark that was reused from the former Q Channel logo (2005–2011).

BeritaSatu logo (2011–2022), it later used for BTV's news programmes.

First logo BTV (2022–2024).

BTV was launched in 1998 as Q Channel (an abbreviation of Quick Channel) by PT Jaring Data Interaktif which was owned by one of RCTI and SCTV executives, Peter F. Gontha. The first program to be held was Q Inspiration. Much of the channel's programming is targeted towards Indonesian executives and the influential upper income segment of the society. Aimed at decision-makers, the channel mostly features talk shows and infotainment programs related to business, economy, politics, lifestyle, and entertainment.

On 15 September 2005, the channel was renamed to QTV. On the 1st of September 2011, QTV transformed into BeritaSatu, which became a news channel, similar to other major news channels in the country, namely Metro TV and tvOne.

In 2021, BeritaSatu was awarded a nationwide terrestrial license one year later.

On 11th of October 2022 at 09.53am (UTC+7), BeritaSatu officially changed its name to BTV after the inauguration of the Investor Daily Summit 2022 by Indonesian President Joko Widodo.

== See also ==
- List of television stations in Indonesia
