= Sukabumi Utara =

- Administrative village
- Interactive map of Sukabumi Utara
- Country: Indonesia
- Province: DKI Jakarta
- Regency: Jakarta
- Subdistrict: Kebon Jeruk

Area
  - Total: 1.57 km^{2} (0.61 sq mi)

Population
  - Total: 46,566
  - Density: 29,700/km^{2} (76,800/sq mi)
- Postal code: 11540

Sukabumi Utara (Indonesian for North Sukabumi) is an administrative village in the Kebon Jeruk district, city of West Jakarta, Indonesia. It has postal code of 11540.

== See also ==
- Kebon Jeruk
- List of administrative villages of Jakarta
