= Buletin Malam =

- Created by: Helmi Johannes
- Starring: Desi Anwar
- Country of origin: Indonesia
- Original language: Indonesian

Production
- Production location: Jakarta
- Camera setup: Multicamera setup
- Running time: 30 minutes

Original release
- Network: RCTI 1991-2009; SCTV 1991-1996
- Release: 1 January 1991 – 8 February 2009

Related
- Seputar Indonesia Malam

Buletin Malam, (literally Nightly Bulletin) is the first newscast containing international stories ever produced by a private television network in Indonesia. It was launched on 1 February 1991 on RCTI, Buletin Malam which was then hosted by Helmi Johannes and Desi Anwar. The newscast is a half-hour pre-midnight news program and it continues to be one of the strongest late night shows in the Indonesian television industry, Buletin Malam was also carried by RCTI's then sister network SCTV.

On 9 February 2009, Seputar Indonesia was revamped and is the only news program on RCTI, now called Satu Seputar Indonesia. The morning news program Nuansa Pagi was renamed Seputar Indonesia Pagi. The afternoon news program, Buletin Siang was renamed Seputar Indonesia Siang. The late night news program, Buletin Malam was renamed Seputar Indonesia Malam. The main evening edition retained the Seputar Indonesia name due to the historical context.
