= Seputar Indonesia =

Indonesian television news program (1990–2017)

- Created by: Peter F. Gontha
- Developed by: RCTI News
- Directed by: Arief Suditomo
- Presented by: Various
- Theme music composer: Andi Rianto (2012–2017); Bhaskara (1989–2012); Luluk Purwanto (1989–2003)
- Country of origin: Indonesia
- Original language: Indonesian

Production
- Executive producers: Ahmad Setiono, Atika Suri, Avida Virya, Deden Kuswondo, Aiman Witjaksono, Catharina Davy
- Production location: Jakarta
- Running time: 30 minutes (lunchtime, evening and late-night editions); 90 minutes (morning edition)

Original release
- Network: RCTI (1990–2017); SCTV (1990–1996)
- Release: 15 November 1990 – 31 October 2017

Related
- Seputar Jakarta (November 1989 – 1990); Seputar iNews

Seputar Indonesia (translated as Around Indonesia) was Indonesia's longest-running flagship newscast carried by a private television network. It debuted for the first time on the newly inaugurated RCTI on 15 November 1989 as the local news program Seputar Jakarta (Around Jakarta), as well as the network's first newscast before it evolved to go nationwide on 15 November 1990. Since the end of 2005, the program has regained its position as the most-watched newscast in the country, according to ratings by Nielsen Media Research. During its early years, Seputar Indonesia was also carried by RCTI's then sister network SCTV.

On 9 February 2009, Seputar Indonesia was revamped and was the only news program on RCTI, under an initiative called Satu Seputar Indonesia (One Around Indonesia). The morning news program, Nuansa Pagi was renamed Seputar Indonesia Pagi. The lunchtime news program, Buletin Siang renamed Seputar Indonesia Siang. The late-night news program, Buletin Malam was renamed Seputar Indonesia Malam. The main evening edition retained the Seputar Indonesia name due to the historical context.

On 1 November 2017, along with rebranding that includes the iNews brand for MNCTV and GTV newscasts, it was replaced by Seputar iNews.

Historically, it was also broadcast by SCTV before the network produced its news program, Liputan 6 respectively.

== Logo history ==
On 15 November 1989, the Seputar Indonesia logo used only the phrase 'SEPUTAR JAKARTA' which was formerly the logo used on 15 November 1989 until 14 November 1990.

On 15 November 1990, the Seputar Indonesia logo used only the phrase 'SEPUTAR INDONESIA' which was renamed and used from what was formerly named Seputar Jakarta by the logo was used on 15 November 1990 until May 19, 1996.

On May 20, 1996, the Seputar Indonesia logo is closed by a circular red ring with the word seputar INDONESIA (the word seputar at the top with the word INDONESIA at the bottom) by the logo was used on May 20, 1996 until 25 August 2002.

On 24 August 2002, Seputar Indonesia replaced the logo with a blue ball closed rings (in a similar shape to Saturn) was used until 24 August 2006.

On 25 August 2006, the logo changed again into a ball bearing the front of RCTI by the logo continued to be used until 9 February 2009.

On 9 February 2009, Seputar Indonesia relaunched the logo and was used until 31 October 2017. The logo is almost similar to the Firefox logo.

== Anchors and former anchors ==
- Atika Suri
- Desi Anwar
- Helmi Johannes
- Putra Nababan
- Aiman Witjaksono
- Trishna Sanubari
- Dana Iswara
- Adolf Posumah
- Asti Husadi
- F.A. Prasetyo
- Ade Novit
- Zsa Zsa Yusharyahya
- Ratna Komala
- Iwan Emawan Malik
- Edwin Nazir
- Inne Sudjono
- Devi Trianna

== Scheduling of main news program ==
Seputar Jakarta

- 12:00-12:30 WIB (15 November 1989 – 13 November 1990)

Seputar Indonesia Pagi

- 04:30-06:00 WIB (9 February 2009 – 31 October 2017)

Seputar Indonesia Siang

- 12:00-12:30 WIB (9 February 2009 – 11 May 2014)
- 11:30-12:00 WIB (12 May 2014 – 31 October 2017)

Seputar Indonesia

- 18:30-19:00 WIB (14 November 1990 – 31 December 2003)
- 18:00-18:30 WIB (1 January 2004 – 23 August 2006)
- 17:30-18:00 WIB (24 August 2006 – 8 February 2009)
- 17:00-17:30 WIB (9 February 2009 – 29 February 2012)
- 16:30-17:00 WIB (1 March 2012 – 31 October 2017)

Seputar Indonesia Malam

- 01:30-02:00 WIB (9 February 2009 – 31 October 2017)

== Broadcasts in other networks, channels, stations and countries ==
Seputar Indonesia was formerly broadcast on SCTV from 24 August 1990 until 19 May 1996.

The program is also aired internationally, such as in Macau (Macau TV by Teledifusao de Macau from 2 January until 31 October 2017).

== See also ==
- Nuansa Pagi (renamed Seputar Indonesia Pagi and later Seputar iNews Pagi)
- Buletin Siang (renamed Seputar Indonesia Siang and later Seputar iNews Siang)
- Buletin Malam (renamed Seputar Indonesia Malam and later Seputar iNews Malam)
