= Isyana Bagoes Oka =

Indonesian politician and journalist (born 1980)

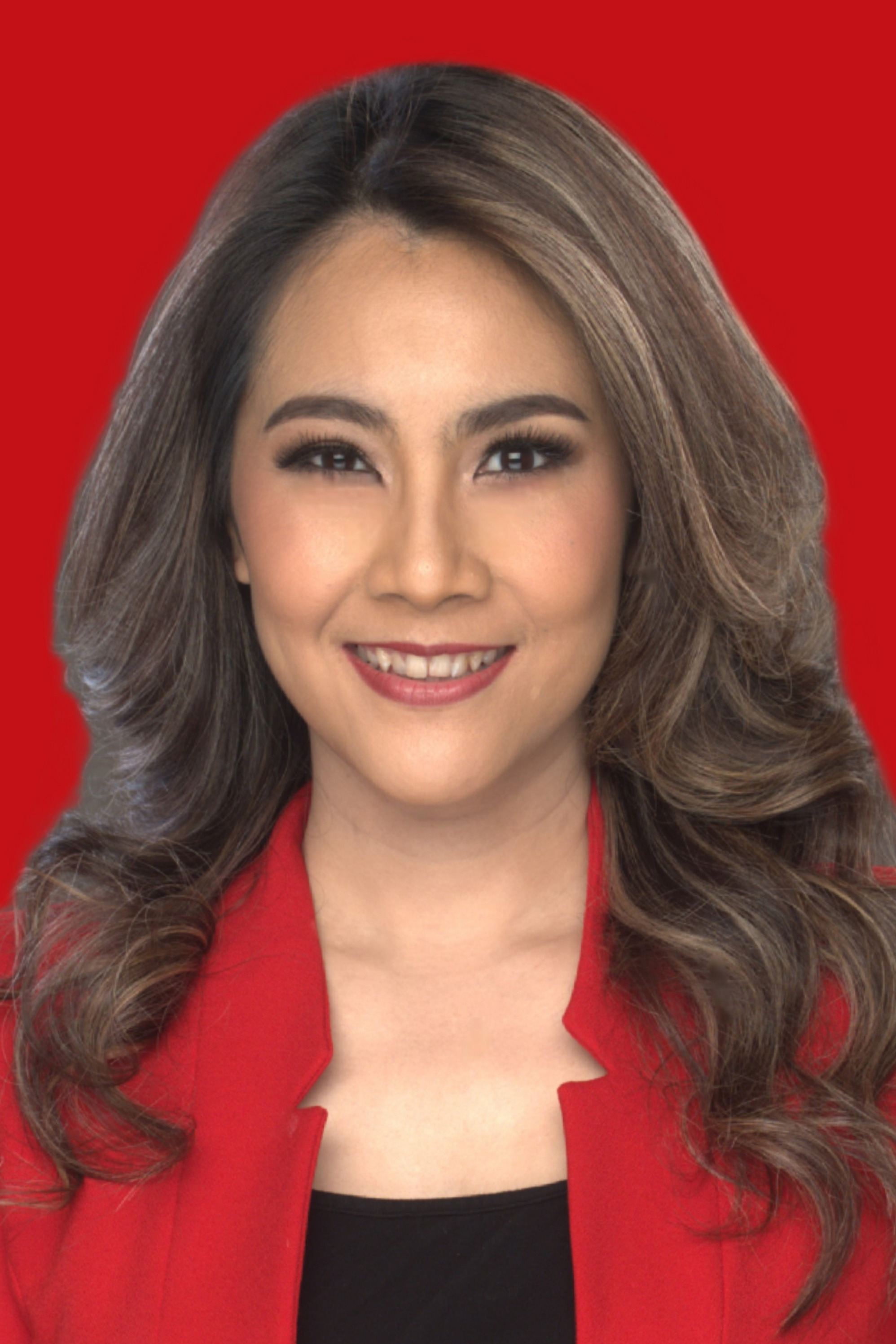

Deputy Minister of Population and Family Development Head of Population and Family Development Agency
- Incumbent
- Assumed office 21 October 2024
- President: Prabowo Subianto
- Minister: Wihaji
- Preceded by: Office established

Personal details
- Born: Ratu Ayu Isyana Bagoes Oka; September 13, 1980 (age 46) Jakarta, Indonesia
- Party: Independent (since 2026)
- Other political affiliations: PSI (2014-2026)
- Spouse: George Albert Tulaar (m. 2009)
- Children: 2
- Parents: I Gusti Benkel Bagoes (father); Meike Bagoes Oka-Singal (mother)
- Occupation: Journalist and politician

Ratu Ayu Isyana Bagoes Oka (born September 13, 1980) is an Indonesian news presenter and a founding leader of the Indonesian Solidarity Party. Since October 2024, she has served as the country's deputy minister of population and family development.

== Early life and education ==
Isyana Bagoes Oka was born in Jakarta, Indonesia, in 1980. She studied international relations at the University of Indonesia. While a student, she began working as a model, winning the Readers' Choice award in the 2000 edition of Femina magazine's annual modeling contest.

== Career ==
=== Journalism ===
Isyana began her career as a journalist in 2003, when she was hired as a reporter for Trans TV. About a year later, she moved to TV7, now known as Trans7, where she worked as both a reporter and a news presenter. Then, in 2007, she was hired by RCTI as a presenter and producer of the Seputar Indonesia. In 2013, she left RCTI to freelance, contributing to Metro TV, Sindo TV (now iNews), Kompas TV, Fox Sports Asia, and others.

In her time as a reporter and presenter, she covered various events including the Aceh tsunami, the 2005 Bali bombings, and the 2008 United States presidential election. She was also assigned to cover the executive branch during the presidency of Susilo Bambang Yudhoyono. Past interviewees include U.S. President George W. Bush, Secretary of State Hillary Clinton, and sports figures Pep Guardiola, Cesc Fàbregas, Robert Pires, and Javier Zanetti.

=== Politics ===
In 2014, Isyana joined other young people, including Grace Natalie and Raja Juli Antoni, to found the Indonesian Solidarity Party (PSI). The following year, she formally ended her journalism career and began pursuing politics as a chair of the PSI's Central Leadership Council. She cited as inspiration her grandmother Gedong Bagus Oka, a Hindu reformer who once served in the People's Consultative Assembly.

In the 2019 Indonesian general election, Isyana joined the campaign team for the incumbent president, Joko Widodo. As a PSI representative, she also ran for a seat in the House of Representatives for the Banten III district, receiving 48,819 personal votes. However, her party did not reach the 4 percent threshold necessary to enter parliament. She ran again in the same district in 2024, earning 78,140 votes, but her party again was unable to enter parliament.

In October 2024, Isyana was named deputy minister of population and family development in new president Prabowo Subianto's Red White Cabinet. In this role, she also serves as deputy head of the National Population and Family Planning Board.

In 2026, she resigned from her responsibilities within the leadership of the PSI to focus on her ministerial role.
