= Aiman (TV program) =

Investigation news program

- Presented by: Aiman Witjaksono
- Country of origin: Indonesia
- Original language: Indonesian

Production
- Running time: 60 minutes
- Production company: KG Production (PT Cipta Megaswara Televisi)

Original release
- Network: Kompas TV
- Release: January 19, 2015 – October 3, 2022

Related
- The Prime Show with Aiman: Rosi; Satu Meja

Aiman was an Indonesian flagship television Investigation news program that broadcasts on Kompas TV. On January 19, 2015, it aired its first episode, Kisah Para Pahlawan dalam Tragedi Pesawat Air Asia QZ8501. It selects the latest and best-selling news throughout the week to be aired more fully and deeply through the program airing Monday.

This program contains a variety of current social issues that are a hot issue in the community, will be discussed in this program. Aiman Witjaksono will invite viewers of Kompas TV to understand various social or community issues in the style of journalistic investigation.

In this program, Aiman will invite viewers to take part directly in the field, gather facts, and interview related people in an event.

This program ended on October 3, 2022, as Aiman resigned from Kompas TV a week later, on October 10, 2022, announcement from his Instagram.
