= Kelapa Dua, Kebon Jeruk =

Kelapa Dua
- Administrative village
- Interactive map of Kelapa Dua
- Country: Indonesia
- Province: DKI Jakarta
- Administrative city: West Jakarta
- District: Kebon Jeruk

Area
  - Total: 1.5 km^{2} (0.58 sq mi)

Population
  - Total: 28,405
  - Density: 19,000/km^{2} (49,000/sq mi)
- Postal code: 11550

Kelapa Dua (Indonesian for Two Coconuts) is an administrative village in the Kebon Jeruk district, city of West Jakarta, Indonesia. It has postal code of 11550.

== See also ==
- Kebon Jeruk
- List of administrative villages of Jakarta
