= Nuansa Pagi =

- Created by: Teguh Juwarno
- Starring: Aiman Witjaksono
- Country of origin: Indonesia
- Original language: Indonesian

Production
- Production location: Jakarta
- Camera setup: Multiple
- Running time: 2 hours

Original release
- Network: RCTI 1991-2009; SCTV 1991-1996
- Release: 1 January 1991 – 8 February 2009

Related
- Buletin Pagi; Seputar Indonesia Pagi

Nuansa Pagi (lit. 'Morning Nuance') is the first morning newscast ever produced by a private television network in Indonesia. Nuansa Pagi debuted on RCTI from 1 January 1991 to 23 August 1993 as Buletin Pagi ('Morning Bulletin') before it evolved to go nationwide on 24 August 1993 as Nuansa Pagi and since then has become one of the strongest morning shows in the country, according to Nielsen Media Research. Nuansa Pagi was also carried by RCTI's then sister network SCTV (1993–1996).

On 9 February 2009, Seputar Indonesia was revamped and is the only news program on RCTI, now called Satu Seputar Indonesia. The morning news program Nuansa Pagi was renamed Seputar Indonesia Pagi. The afternoon news program Buletin Siang was renamed Seputar Indonesia Siang. The late night news program Buletin Malam was renamed Seputar Indonesia Malam. The main evening edition retained the Seputar Indonesia name due to the historical context.

== Logo history ==
On 24 August 1993, the Nuansa Pagi logo was a rainbow half-circle with word NUANSA PAGI used until 31 December 1994.

On 1 January 1995, the Nuansa Pagi logo with rainbow half-circle and blue earth ball with box bottom of it, with word NUANSA in the half-circle while PAGI was in the bottom box; used until from 31 December 1995. On 1 January 1996, the Nuansa Pagi 1995 logo has 3D graphics until 30 September 2001.

On 1 October 2001, The Nuansa Pagi used the logo with a square box and a blue Earth Ball, with the letter N and the RCTI Logo at the bottom was used until from 31 July 2002.

On 1 August 2002, The Nuansa Pagi used the logo with a square box and a blue Earth Ball, with the letter N behind the blue Earth ball at the bottom, used until from 31 January 2003.

On 1 February 2003, the logo used was a blue square box bottom and words nuansa pagi and red ball bottom near the letter 'I' was used until 31 July 2006.

On 1 August 2006, the logo was changed to Seputar Indonesia logos from 1 August 2006 until 8 February 2009.

== Segments ==
- Main News
- Regional
- Crime
- Special
- Sportivo
- Crime News
- Only on Indonesia
- Chosen picture

== Host ==
- Aiman Witjaksono (Main Anchor)
- Iwan Harjadi (Main Anchor)
- Isyana Bagoes Oka (Main Anchor)
- Zaldy Noer (Sport and Criminal)
- Joice Triatman (Weekend Edition)
- Michael Tjandra (Weekend Edition)
- Cheryl Tanzil (Former Weekend Edition)

== See also ==
- Seputar Indonesia
- Buletin Siang
- Buletin Malam
