= Duri Kepa =

- Administrative village
- Interactive map of Duri Kepa
- Country: Indonesia
- Province: DKI Jakarta
- City: West Jakarta
- District: Kebon Jeruk

Area
  - Total: 3.87 km^{2} (1.49 sq mi)

Population
  - Total: 72,191
  - Density: 18,700/km^{2} (48,300/sq mi)
- Postal code: 11510

Duri Kepa is an administrative village in the Kebon Jeruk district of Indonesia. It has postal code of 11510. The headman of this administrative villages is Syamsul Huda, M.Si.

== See also ==
- Kebon Jeruk
- List of administrative villages of Jakarta
