= Tri Polyta =

Indonesian chemical manufacturer

- Formerly: PT Tri Polyta Indonesia Tbk
- Industry: Chemical manufacturing
- Headquarters: Indonesia
- Website: www.chandra-asri.com

Tri Polyta is an insolvent Indonesian chemicals manufacturer which has acquired notoriety in Indonesian investment circles because of its default on a large 1996 bond issue and its success in persuading a court in Indonesia to protect it from the enforcement of its bond obligations.

Tri Polyta (formally PT Tri Polyta Indonesia Tbk) brought a lawsuit in the district court of Serang, naming ninety-seven defendants, including AIM Capital Management, Houston, Texas; Cargill Financial Services Corp., Minnetonka, Minn.; Invista Capital Management, Des Moines, Iowa; BNP Paribas Asset Management, New York; Oaktree Capital Management, Los Angeles, Calif.; Cerberus Capital Management, New York; Euroclear, Brussels, Belgium, and Millennium Partners, New York. It argued that it had been induced by the actions of the defendants into entering into an underwriting agreement that was fraudulent under Indonesian law.

The court agreed in May 2004, freeing Tri Polyta of the obligation to repay US$185 million in principal, as well as close to US$119 million in interest. The creditors were appealing.

In 2011, Prajogo Pangestu acquired Tri Polyta.
