= Kebon Jeruk =

Subdistrict in West Jakarta

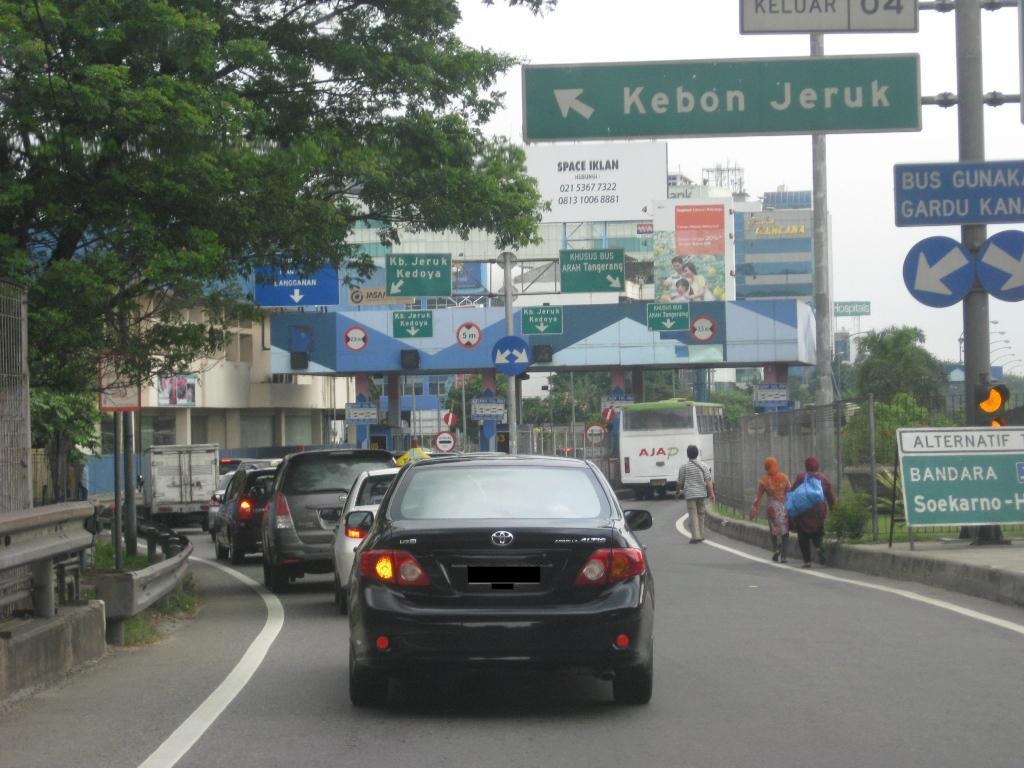
Kebon Jeruk Tollway exit ramp

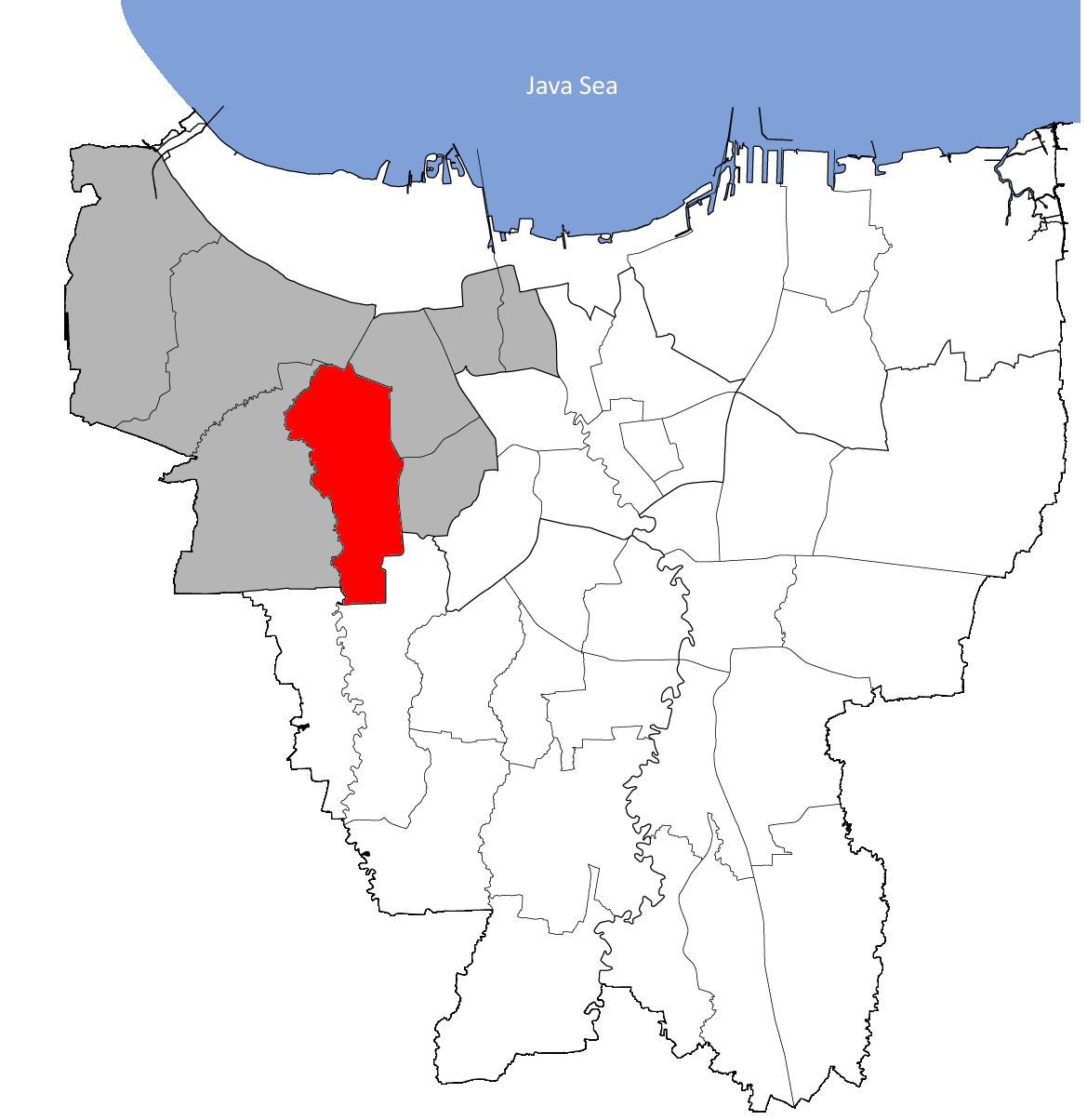
Kebon Jeruk

Kebon Jeruk (Indonesian for "orange garden") is a district (kecamatan) of West Jakarta Administrative City, Indonesia. Kebon Jeruk is roughly bounded by Kali Pesanggrahan creek to the west, Kebayoran Lama Road to the south, Daan Mogot Road to the north, and Rawa Belong - Batu Sari Road to the east. The area is approximately 17.54 square km, and the official estimate of population as at mid 2023 was 370,282.

The Jakarta–Tangerang Toll Road passes through the district, connecting Jakarta to Merak in Banten Province. The major streets in Kebon Jeruk are Panjang Road, Arjuna Utara (North Arjuna) and Arjuna Selatan (South Arjuna) Roads, and Perjuangan Road.

== Kelurahan (administrative villages) ==
The district of Kebon Jeruk is divided into seven kelurahan or administrative villages:

- Duri Kepa - area code 11510
- Kedoya Selatan - area code 11520
- Kedoya Utara - area code 11520
- Kebon Jeruk, Kebon Jeruk - area code 11530
- Sukabumi Utara - area code 11540
- Kelapa Dua - area code 11550
- Sukabumi Selatan - area code 11560

== List of important places ==
- RCTI headquarters
- MNCTV headquarters
- GTV headquarters
- Indosiar headquarters
- Metro TV headquarters
- Maria Bunda Karmel Church
- Grha Kedoya Hospital
- Siloam Hospital
- Jakarta Eye Center (JEC)
- Bina Nusantara University
- SMAN 16 Jakarta Barat
- Museum Macan

== Transport ==
=== City Bus (Transjakarta) ===
- Koridor 8 Lebak Bulus - Pasar Baru
- 8D Joglo - Terminal Blok M

=== MRT Jakarta (Future) ===
- MRT Jakarta (Future Planned) East West Line Cikarang - Balaraja
