= MNC Trijaya FM =

- Type: Radio network
- Country: Indonesia
- Availability: National
- Headquarters: iNews Tower 5th floor MNC Center Complex; Jalan Kebon Sirih Raya No. 17-19, Kebon Sirih, Jakarta
- Owner: MNC Radio Networks (PT Radio Trijaya Shakti)
- Established: 1 December 1970 (as an AM radio station); 13 November 1988 (as an FM radio station)
- Former names: Trijaya FM (1988–2012); Sindo Radio (2012–2013); Sindo Trijaya FM (2013–2017)
- Official website: www.mnctrijaya.com

PM2FGS
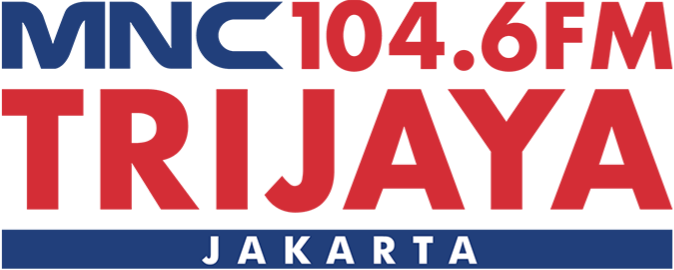
- Central Jakarta, Jakarta; Indonesia
- Broadcast area: Jabodetabek and surrounding regencies
- Frequency: 104.6 MHz
- Branding: MNC Trijaya 104.6 FM Jakarta

Programming
- Format: News, talk and Hot AC

Ownership
- Owner: MNC Radio Networks (PT Radio Trijaya Shakti)
- Sister stations: Global Radio 88.4 Jakarta, 97.1 RDI Jakarta, V Radio 106.6 Jakarta

History
- First air date: 1 December 1970 (as an AM radio station); 13 November 1988 (as an FM radio station)

MNC Trijaya FM (formerly known as Trijaya FM Network, Sindo Radio and Sindo Trijaya FM) is an Indonesian radio network founded in 1970.

== Network ==
=== Radio stations ===
1. MNC Trijaya FM Jakarta (104.6 FM) PT. Radio Trijaya Shakti
2. MNC Trijaya FM Banda Aceh (96.9 FM)
3. MNC Trijaya FM Surabaya (104.7 FM) PT. Radio Cakra Awigra
4. MNC Trijaya FM Pekanbaru (104.2 FM)
5. MNC Trijaya FM Banjarmasin (104.3 FM) PT. Radio Suara Banjar Lazuardi
6. MNC Trijaya FM Dumai (100.5 FM) PT. Radio Kalender Angkasa
7. MNC Trijaya FM Lahat (98.4 FM)
8. MNC Trijaya FM Baturaja (94.1 FM)
9. MNC Trijaya FM Yogyakarta (97.0 FM) PT. Radio Efkindo
10. MNC Trijaya FM Pontianak (97.5 FM)
11. MNC Trijaya FM Makasar, via ZIP FM (93.9 FM)
12. MNC Trijaya FM Manado, via CWS-FM (89.4 FM)
13. MNC Trijaya FM Medan (95.1 FM) PT. Radio Prapanca Buana Suara
14. MNC Trijaya FM Kendari (92.4 FM)
15. MNC Trijaya FM Bandung (91.3 FM) PT. Radio Mancaswara
16. MNC Trijaya FM Semarang (89.8 FM) PT. Radio Suara Caraka Ria
17. MNC Trijaya FM Palembang (87.6 FM) PT. Radio Tiara Gempita Buana
18. MNC Trijaya FM Kayuagung (91.7 FM)
19. MNC Trijaya FM Palu (92.3 FM)
20. MNC Trijaya FM Cirebon (96.5 FM)
21. Pesona FM Padang (105.0 FM)
22. Gemaya FM Balikpapan (104.5 FM)
23. RBFM Samarinda (87.7 FM)

=== Satellite network ===
1. SES-7 2595/H/20000
2. Merah Putih 3980/V/31000
3. Measat 3b 12563/H/31000

=== Media subscribe customer-based network ===
1. MNC Vision Channel 500
2. First Media Channel 601

== Programming ==
=== Current programs ===
- Polemik Trijaya
- Lintas Trijaya
- Trijaya Sports
- Indonesia Luar Berita
- Indonesia Dalam Berita
- Live Wisdom
- Bincang Finansial
- Power of Life
- Market Report
- Tokoh Bicara
- Coffee Corner
- Indonesia Bersaing
- The Leader
- Trijaya UKM Forum
- NGOBAR Trijaya
- DEBAR Trijaya
- Pit Stop
- Cruisin' the Night
- Trijaya Rock Hits
- Late Nite Hits
- Book Talk
- Wake Up Call
- Music Mix
- Trijaya Happy Weekend
- Weekend Update
- Healthy Life
- Komunitas Baca Buku
- Komentar Rakyat

=== Previously-aired programmes ===
==== As Trijaya FM ====
- RCTI News
  - Nuansa Pagi
  - Seputar Indonesia
- Top 40
- Good Morning Trijaya Listeners
- The Retro Show
- Business World
- Happy Hour
- Fisioterapi
- Carlo Carlos Show
- Trend & Perilaku
- TGIF
- Bisnis & Etiket
- Seksologi
- Sixties Round The Clock
- It's Saturday & Y Not
- Jamz Report
- Lintasan Informasi
- On The Radio
- Bincang Sabtu
- Trijaya News Round Up
- Dance Music
- Bedah Kasus
- K-Pop Trijaya
- Seks, Problema & Solusinya
- Intrik Bersama Kafi Kurnia
- Narkoba Masalah Kita
- Solusi Sehat
- Jammin On Jazz
- Indonesia First Channel
- After Office Hour
- Parliament On Radio
- Everlasting Hits
- Trijaya Local Vocal
- Trijaya All Time Hits
- Sweet Rock Supreme
- More Than Just Night
- Drive N Jive

== Slogan history ==
=== As Trijaya FM ===
- Real Radio (1988–2011)
- More Than Just Music (1988–2011)

=== As Sindo Radio ===
- Sumber Informasi Terpercaya (2011–2013)

=== As Sindo Trijaya FM ===
- Untuk Indonesia Lebih Baik (2013–2015)
- Informasi & Lagu Enak (2015–2016)
- The Real News & Information (2016–2017)

=== As MNC Trijaya FM ===
- The Real News & Information (2017–present)

== Jingles ==
The Trijaya FM jingles throughout the history. Previously Trijaya FM used the KOST 103 and Sky Radio Jingles from JAM Creative Productions. As MNC Trijaya FM The jingles used the WLIT FM from Reelworld

Jingle Trijaya FM as JAM

- More Than Just Music, FM On Trijaya
- You Are Listening To Trijaya FM, More Than Just Music
- You Listening The Real Radio, 104,6
- Trijaya FM Radio From Jakarta
- 104,6 Trijaya FM Jakarta

Jingle MNC Trijaya FM as Reelworld

- Think Sharp, Work Smart, Have Fun, 104,6 Trijaya FM
- 104,6 Trijaya FM Jakarta
- Enjoy The Wonderful Weekend 104,6 Trijaya FM (Weekend Version)
- Trijaya FM
- MNC Trijaya FM, The Real News and Information
