= Astaga.com =

Astaga.com is an Indonesian focused internet brand that was founded in 2000 as part of the Indonesian internet investment company Indonesia Online. The site offers local news content, a search engine, and e-commerce facilities. After investing US $7 million, it was sold to South African-based Media conglomerate, M-Web in 2001 for an undisclosed sum. It grew over the years and peaked in 2004 with over 300 employees and Indonesia wide presence. In late 2004 M-Web decided to exit Indonesia and sold the operating assets of Astaga.com and Kafegaul.com to a consortium of foreign and Indonesian investors. In 2012 Astaga.com was purchased by an international investment company run by Phil Rickard and Sandy Gunawan. As of late 2013, Astaga.com was in beta launch.
