= MNC Channel =

Indonesian pay television channel

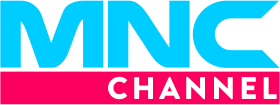
- Logo used from January to March 2020
- Broadcast area: Indonesia and worldwide

Programming
- Languages: Indonesian; English

Ownership
- Owner: MNC Media
- Parent: MNC Channels
- Sister channels: Ent; ie; Lifestyle & Fashion; Vision Prime

History
- Launched: 20 August 2006; 20 years ago
- Closed: 13 March 2020; 6 years ago
- Replaced by: Pesona HD; OK TV
- Former names: MNC The Indonesian Channel (20 August 2006 – 7 December 2010); MNC International (7 December 2010 - 30 June 2015)

Links
- Website: www.mncchannels.com/micro/mnc-channel

MNC Channel was an Indonesian international television channel owned by MNC Media. The Channel aired news and entertainment programs from Indonesia for Indonesian communities worldwide.

The Channel was launched as "MNC The Indonesian Channel" in August 2006 and changed its name to MNC International in 2010 and MNC Channel in 2015.

In March 2020, the Channel was replaced by OK TV, now Food Travel.
