= Seputar iNews =

- Created by: Hary Tanoesoedibjo
- Presented by: See Presenters
- Theme music composer: Andi Rianto
- Country of origin: Indonesia
- Original language: Indonesian

Production
- Executive producer: Salman Ibnu Hasky
- Producers: iNews Division: Syafril Nasution (News Director); Aiman Witjaksono (Editor in Chief); Soemiadeny; Dedi Prasetia Sitem (Deputy Editor in Chief); Seputar iNews: Kurniana Usfaika; Yuda Adipraja; Septiani Wulandari
- Camera setup: Multi-camera setup
- Running time: 30 minutes (Seputar iNews)
- Production companies: iNews Media Group; RCTI

Original release
- Network: RCTI; Sindonews TV (relay, only)
- Release: 1 November 2017 – present

Seputar iNews (Around iNews, taken from the term Seputar Indonesia and iNews) is an Indonesian flagship news programme which broadcast on RCTI, replacing Seputar Indonesia which aired from 13 November 1988 to 31 October 2017. The program broadcast for two to three hours each day through Seputar iNews (breakfast news), Sekilas iNews (headline news), and Breaking iNews (breaking news, different coverage with iNews).

== Timeslots List ==
=== Seputar iNews ===
- Weekdays, 05.15 WIB - 05.45 WIB

=== Sekilas iNews ===
- Weekdays, five times a day

=== Breaking iNews ===
- Everyday, rarely

== See also ==
- Buletin iNews
- Lintas iNews
- iNews
- Sindo
