= Kedoya Selatan =

Coordinates: 6°11′S 106°46′E

- Administrative village
- Interactive map of Kedoya Selatan
- Country: Indonesia
- Province: DKI Jakarta
- Regency: Jakarta
- Subdistrict: Kebon Jeruk

Area
  - Total: 2.28 km^{2} (0.88 sq mi)

Population
  - Total: 38,816
  - Density: 17,000/km^{2} (44,100/sq mi)
- Postal code: 11520

Kedoya Selatan (Indonesian for South Kedoya) is an administrative village in the Kebon Jeruk district, city of West Jakarta, Indonesia. It has postal code of 11520.

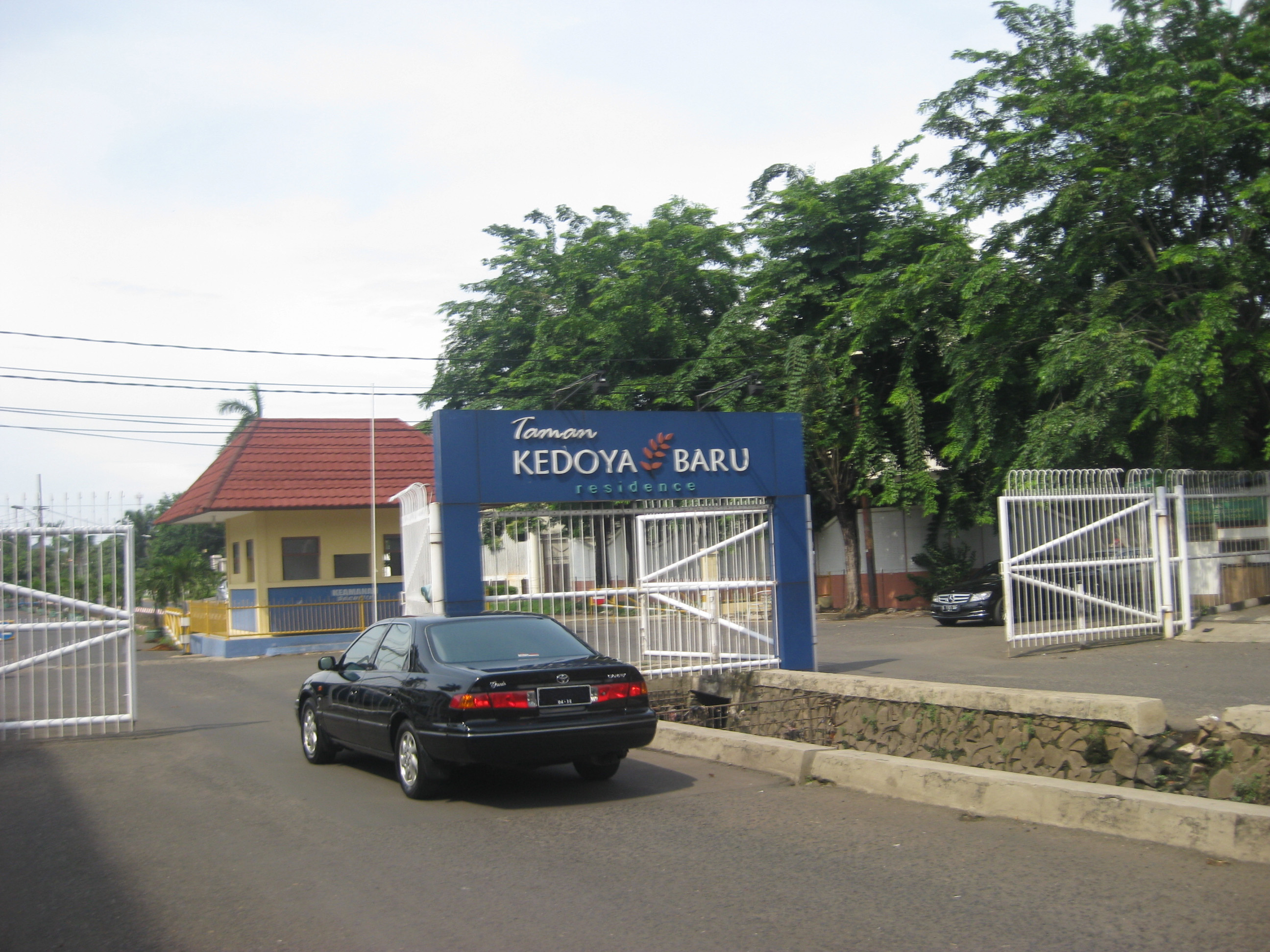
Taman Kedoya Baru

Taman Kedoya Baru residential estate and Kedoya Elok Apartment are located in this area. Taman Kedoya Sport Club is a sport center in the residential estate. Facilities are tennis courts, swimming pools, and a fitness center.

The Jakarta–Tangerang Toll Road has eastbound exit ramp in Kedoya. This is the last exit ramp before the eastern terminus in Tomang, which also merges to Jakarta Inner Ring Road.

== List of Important Places ==
- MetroTV headquarters
- Jakarta Eye Center (JEC)
- Taman Kedoya Sport Club
- Polabugar Sport Center

== See also ==
- Kebon Jeruk
- List of administrative villages of Jakarta
