= Desi Anwar =

Indonesian news presenter

- Born: 11 December 1962 (age 63); Bandung, West Java
- Occupations: TV journalist, author
- Relatives: Dewi Fortuna Anwar (sister)

Desi Anwar (born 11 December 1962, in Bandung, West Java) is an Indonesian news presenter. She worked for RCTI in Jakarta from 1990 to 1999. She then moved to news web portal Astaga.com before returning to television and joining Indonesia's first 24-hour television news network, Metro TV, in 2001. In 2015, she joined CNN Indonesia and is currently hosting Insight with Desi Anwar.

== Education ==
Desi Anwar holds a Bachelor of Arts degree in French and European Studies from the University of Sussex, England, and a Master of Arts degree in Indonesian and Malay Studies from SOAS, University of London.

Anwar was a Jefferson Fellow at the East-West Center, Honolulu, USA, in 1999.

She speaks Indonesian, English and French.

Anwar was recognised for her contributions to society and honoured for her achievements at the 2013 graduation ceremonies of SOAS, University of London becoming an Honorary Fellow.

== Writing ==
Anwar has been a columnist for The Indonesian Observer, Tempo magazine and The Jakarta Globe. She is the author of several non-fiction books and a book of short stories.

=== Books ===
- A Simple Life (2014). A collection of musings and anecdotes.
- Faces & Places (2016). A collection of travel writing.
- 148 Tips for Life: Everyday Wisdom for a Happy, Healthy and Balanced Life (2016) A self-help book.
- Being Indonesian (2017). A collection of columns from 1997 to 2007
- Growing Pain: Five Stories, Five Lives (2018). Five short stories about young people facing struggles in life.
- Going Offline: Finding yourself in a life full of distractions (2019)
