= Voice of America Indonesia =

United States broadcast service to Indonesia

VOA Indonesia is the Indonesian service of the Voice of America (VOA). Broadcasting from Washington, DC, USA, the service produces programs for radio, television and website that especially catered for the Indonesian audience in their native language, Indonesian. VOA Indonesia first aired programs in Indonesian through shortwave radio in 1942.

VOA Indonesia produces 9.5 hours of original radio programming per day and an average of 6.5 hours of television each week.

VOA Indonesia also produces Jurnal VOA (lit. 'VOA Journal'), a 25-minute weekday newscast, in Washington DC and broadcast by its prominent partner Metro TV in Jakarta. Aired at 5:05 a.m. (UTC+7), the newscast has become the first live program of the station before its own morning show, Metro Pagi broadcast at 5:30 a.m.
