= MNCTV =

Television network in Indonesia

- Current logo, an iteration of 2010 logo, used since 20 May 2015.
- Type: Television broadcaster
- Country: Indonesia
- Broadcast area: Nationwide
- Affiliates: Les' Copaque Production (2006-present)
- Headquarters: MNC Studios, Kebon Jeruk, West Jakarta

Programming
- Language: Indonesian
- Picture format: 1080i HDTV (downscaled to 16:9 576i for the SDTV feed)

Ownership
- Owner: Siti Hardiyanti Rukmana (1990–2006); Citra Lamtoro Gung Persada (1990–2002); Berkah Karya Bersama (2002-2006); MNC Media (2003–present)
- Parent: Global Mediacom (MNC Asia Holding)
- Key people: Sang Nyoman Suwisma
- Sister channels: TVRI (1990–1998); Metro TV (2003); RCTI (2003–present); GTV (2003–present); iNews (2008–present)

History
- Founded: 23 January 1990
- Launched: 26 December 1990 (trial broadcast); 23 January 1991; 35 years ago (original; official broadcast); 20 October 2010 (as MNCTV)
- Founder: Siti Hardiyanti Rukmana
- Former names: TPI (1990–2010)

Links
- Website: www.mnctv.com

Availability

Terrestrial
- Digital Greater Jakarta: 28 (UHF); Channel 29
- Digital Regional branches: Check local frequencies (in Indonesian language)

Streaming media
- RCTI+: Watch live (Indonesia only)
- Vision+: Watch live (Subscription required, Indonesia only)

PT MNC Televisi Indonesia (previously PT Televisi Pendidikan Indonesia and PT Cipta Televisi Pendidikan Indonesia), operating as MNCTV (abbreviation for Media Nusantara Citra Televisi, formerly known as TPI) is an Indonesian private free-to-air television broadcaster. It was founded on 23 January 1990. At first, the station broadcast only educational programmes, but has since become similar to other Indonesian TV networks. It currently airs programs such as quizzes, sinetron (soap operas), reality TV shows, sports shows, newscasts, animation series from Les' Copaque Production, and recently dangdut music.

== History ==
=== Abbreviations for TPI ===
Name	First usage	Last usage
Televisi Pendidikan Indonesia (Indonesian Education Television)	1991	1997
Televisi Keluarga Indonesia (The Indonesian Family Channel)	1996	2002
none	2002	2006
Televisi Paling Indonesia (Most Indonesian Television)	2006	2010

=== Early days ===
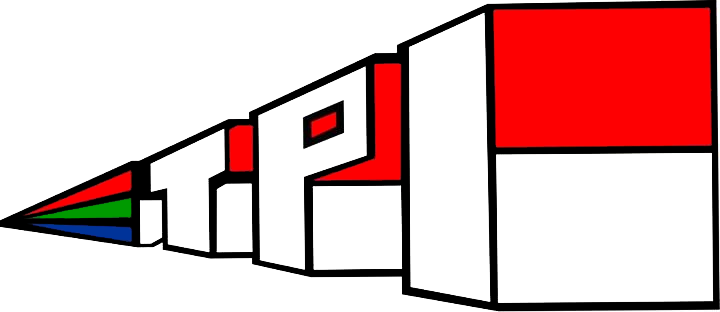
First logo used from 23 January 1991 until 23 January 1998. After that, the logo continued to use as a corporate logo until 23 January 2002.

Second logo used under the slogan Televisi Keluarga Indonesia from 1996 until 23 January 2002.

TPI (Televisi Pendidikan Indonesia, Indonesian Educational Television) was first founded as an educational television network by Tutut Soeharto, the first daughter of former president Soeharto and the wife of Bimantara Citra's co-founder and RCTI's then-commissioner Indra Rukmana on 23 January 1990 via her company PT Citra Lamtoro Gung Persada. It began its first broadcasts as trial broadcast on 26 December 1990 and later officially launched on 23 January 1991, timeshared with then state broadcaster TVRI. TPI also used TVRI's Studio 12 as its operational studio.

When it was founded TPI produced a two-hour educational programming block targeted to elementary students, middle school students, and high school students, from 08:00 to 10:00 WIB. To do so, it cooperated with the Department of Education and Culture (now Ministry of Primary and Secondary Education, Ministry of Culture and Ministry of Higher Education, Science and Technology). Programming time began at 6:00am with the country's first breakfast TV show produced by the channel, with the rest of the day dedicated to cartoons and other child-friendly programming, signing off early afternoon.

In April 1991, the block was expanded into 4 hours, from 08:00 to 12:00 WIB; later to 6.5 hours, from 06:30 to 12:00 WIB; and in 1992 TPI was already broadcasting eight hours in a day, from 06:00 to 14:00 WIB, with several hours being a joint simulcast with TVRI for its educational programming. On January 23, 1993, TPI began to air its first soap opera program as a distraction, while it expanded broadcasting hours to 15.5 hours, from 05:30 to 21:00. By then it gained its own frequency - TPI UHF Channel 34, later on moved to Channel 37 on 18 May 1993. The broadcast in UHF marked a milestone for Indonesian television.

=== 1993–2003: Splitting service ===
On 23 January 1993, TPI began to air its first reality TV show. Three years later, TPI launched its own news programming. After TPI ended its ties with TVRI on 1 October 1998, TPI split becoming its own dedicated channel and its educational programs were displaced by more soap operas and entertainment programming, while it began to air to more Indonesian provinces.

In 1995, TPI moved to Gate II Taman Mini Indonesia Indah in East Jakarta, with the opening of new studios as part of the celebrations of 50 years of nationhood.

In late 1997, the channel retired the original branding name in favour of the on-air name "Televisi Keluarga Indonesia" ("The Indonesian Family Channel") which introduced in early 1996. Its logo bore a resemblance to that of the Family Channel (now Freeform in US and Challenge in UK). On 18 May 2001, the TPI name was used but only using the simple word "TPI" instead. TPI began to expand more programs that related to music, sports, and cartoons. TPI's broadcasting of the Tom and Jerry series is considered to be a cult classic for Indonesian fans, but it also controversially and excessively viewing and teaching cruelty to animals behavior to anyone who watching it, thus destroying the educational television images on the eyes of society.

Since 2004, it has focused on dangdut programs. The most successful dangdut contest, Kontes Dangdut TPI (KDI, later Kontes Dangdut Indonesia), is a version of RCTI's Indonesian Idol, in turn a version of Pop Idol.

In early January 2002, TPI announced that it would broadcast Formula One auto racing, replacing RCTI from 2002 season. This lasted until 2004, after which the broadcasts were moved to Global TV. During this period, TPI also aired various mixed martial arts programming, including local MMA fights under the TPI Fighting Championship banner.

In July 2002, TPI announced that it would broadcast the Italian football league Serie A (replacing FA Premier League). The arrangement lasted only for the 2002–03 season, but the channel would pick up the rights to Serie A again for 2006–07 season.

=== 2003–2009: Awards and acquisition by MNC ===
At the 1997 Indonesian Soap-Opera Awards, Deddy Mizwar's soap opera Mat Angin, aired by TPI, won 11 awards. The series won five awards the following year. Indonesia's favourite programme was Santapan Nusantara a culinary program hosted by Enita Sriyana, the late Nindy Ellesse, and the late Ida Kusumah. Kuis Dangdut (hosted by H. Jaja Miharja), the first and oldest quiz show, also won awards and Ngelaba a comedy program hosted by Akri Patrio, Eko Patrio and Parto Patrio.

In October 2003, Media Nusantara Citra, which also owns RCTI, GTV, and iNews acquired 75% of the channel. In 2005, new employees were hired, including Mayjen. TNI. (purn.) Sang Nyoman Suwisma, and Dandy Nugroho Rukmana.

=== 2009–present: Bankruptcy and rebranding to MNCTV ===
The last TPI logo used from 23 January 2006 until 20 October 2010

==== 2010-nowadays: All MNCTV logos (2010-now), (subchapter) ====
The first logo of MNCTV used from 20 October 2010 until 19 May 2015.

The current MNCTV logo (19 May 2015-nowadays)

During the 2009–10 broadcasting season, TPI stopped airing sports programming. In 2009, TPI was placed into bankruptcy after it failed to pay obligations to Crown Global Capital Limited, due to be paid in 2006. The bankruptcy, as decided in October that year by Jakarta Commercial Court, was ultimately overturned by the Supreme Court in March 2010, following several legal battles, in which Tutut Suharto was accused by MNC management to have backed Crown Capital in order to regain control of the channel. After the bankruptcy was overturned, on 20 October 2010, TPI rebranded to MNCTV, amidst objections from Tutut Soeharto. The name change was done on suggestion by marketing agency MarkPlus Inc.

In 2014, Tutut announced plans for relaunch of the original TPI, although it has yet to materialize. In October 2015, MNCTV's Jakarta frequencies suffered from broadcast signal intrusions in which color bars reading "TPI 37 UHF" appeared for a brief period of time; Tutut's TPI denied the responsibility for the hijacking.

== Programs ==
This is the list of MNCTV programs as of March 2024.

- Upin & Ipin
- Lintas iNews
- Family 100
- Kilau Uang Kaget Lagi & Bedah Rumah Lagi
- Take Me Out Indonesia
- Dapur Ngebor
- KDI (Kontes Dangdut Indonesia)
- DMD Panggung Rezeki
- Kontes Primadona Pantura

== Presenters ==
=== Current ===
- Aldi Hawari (former TVRI and CNN Indonesia anchor, also an anchor at iNews, Sindonews TV and Okezone TV)
- Angellica De Evagam (former RCTI anchor, also an anchor at Sindonews TV and IDX Channel)
- Bayu Pradhana (also an anchor at iNews and Sindonews TV)
- Anita Kusumah Dewi (former RCTI anchor, also an anchor at Sindonews TV and IDX Channel)
- Desvita Feranika Bionda (former RCTI anchor, also an anchor at Sindonews TV and IDX Channel)
- Kevin Pakan (also an anchor at iNews, Sindonews TV, IDX Channel and Okezone TV)
- Mega Latu (also an anchor at iNews and Sindonews TV)
- Rosaline Hioe (former NET. anchor, also an anchor at iNews, Sindonews TV and IDX Channel)
- Amanda Dasrul (also an anchor at Sindonews TV)

=== Former ===
- Lasmita Dewi
- Yulita Roni
- Rencany Indra Martani
- Dewi Kumala
- Dian Ayu Lestari
- Dwi Saraswati
- Olivia Fendry
- Riska Amelia (does not work on any television network)
- Agung Kurniawan (not working on any television network)
- Maharenny Hamidah/Renny Hamid (still working at MNC Media, but as regional coordinator supervisor)
- Sheika Rauf
- Eveline Jody
- Dian Puspitasari
- Dea Lestari
- Farah Dilla
- Tommy Fadjar
- Koni Bardianto
- Brigita Manohara (now at tvOne)
- Krisna Mukti
- Meidiana Hutomo
- Trie Ambarwati
- Patricia Ranieta
- Virgianty Kusumah
- Aprilia Putri
- Hamdan Alkafie (now at Metro TV)
- Resa Aruan
- Kenia Gusnaeni (now on RTV)
- Andara Rainy Ayudini (now at Jak TV)
- Ule
- Dimas Wibowo
- Valerina Daniel (now at TVRI World)
- Chantal Della Concetta
- Ade Mulya
- Liviana Cherlisa Latief (now at Kompas TV)
- Dentamira Kusuma
- Winda Cahyadi
- Vinicia Wibawa (not working on any television network)
- Vandana Nanwani
- Priscilla Marietta
- Faizal Aprialdi (still working at MNC Media but moved to Sportstars)
- Ahmad Al Hafiz (still working at MNC Media but moved to MNC Digital Entertainment as corporate secretary)
- Lang Alamanda
- Ayu Jelita (still working at MNC Media but moved to Sindonews TV and IDX Channel)
- Ratu Nabilla (returned to work at MNC Media but at RCTI, iNews, Sindonews TV and BuddyKu)
- Yudi Yudhawan (returned to work at Trans Media, but at CNN Indonesia)
- Monica Chua (now on CNBC Indonesia)
- Ajie Kaktus
- Jessica Bella
- Lestari Tanjung
- Wiwied Salman
- Mercy Andrea (not working on any television network)
- Yeni Marliani (still working at MNC Media, but moved to Jalinan Kasih Foundation)
- Sofia Ranti (still working at MNC Media, but as news presenter coordinator)
- Samudra Bramantyo
- David Silahooij (now at iNews & Sindonews TV)

== Notable main directors ==
- Siti Hardiyanti Rukmana (1990–1998)
- Tito Sulistio (1998–2001)
- Dandy Nugroho Rukmana (2001–2003)
- Hidajat Tjandradjaja (2003–2005)
- Sang Nyoman Suwisma (2005–present)

== See also ==
- List of television stations in Indonesia
- MNC Trijaya FM
- TV Edukasi
