= Indovision =

Direct broadcast satellite provider in Indonesia

PT MNC Sky Vision Tbk
- Logo used since 2025 (Note: The logo's style has been in use since 1997.)
- Formerly: PT Malicak Nusa Semesta (1988–1989); PT Matahari Lintas Cakrawala (1989–2006)
- Type: Public
- Traded as: IDX: MSKY
- Industry: Satellite television
- Founded: 8 August 1988; 38 years ago (company founded); 16 January 1994; 32 years ago (launch)
- Headquarters: Jakarta, Indonesia
- Area served: Indonesia
- Key people: Peter F. Gontha (Co-founder); Ade Tjendra (President Director); Hari Susanto (President Commissioner); Syafril Nasution (President Commissioner, MNC Vision Networks)
- Owner: MNC Vision Networks
- Parent: MNC Asia Holding (via Global Mediacom)
- Website: indovision.tv

Indovision, previously known as MNC Vision, Indovision (original incarnation), Top TV, and OkeVision is a direct-to-home satellite television and radio service in Indonesia on a subscription basis. It is owned by PT MNC Vision Networks Tbk, which is a subsidiary of MNC Asia Holding. Indovision is the first and oldest subscription-based television service in Indonesia.

== History ==
=== Early operational ===
The first Indovision logo used in 1994 to 1995.

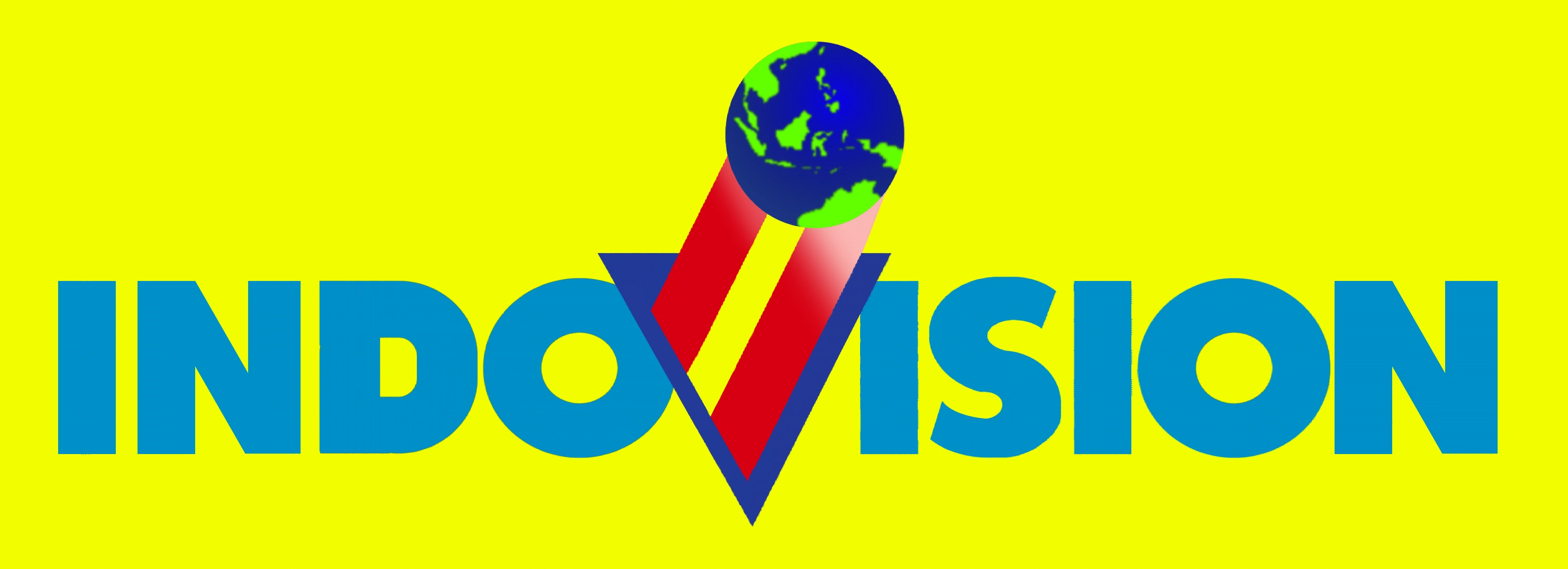
The second Indovision logo used in 1995 to 1997.

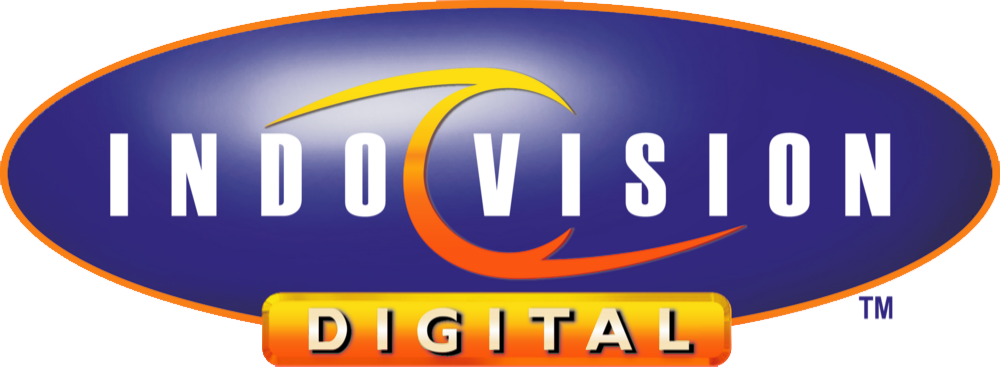
The third Indovision logo used in 1997 to 2017.

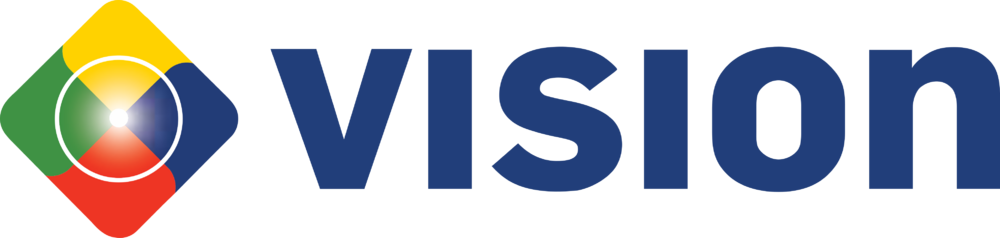
The first MNC Vision logo used in 2017 to 2019, used in television 2019 to 2026.

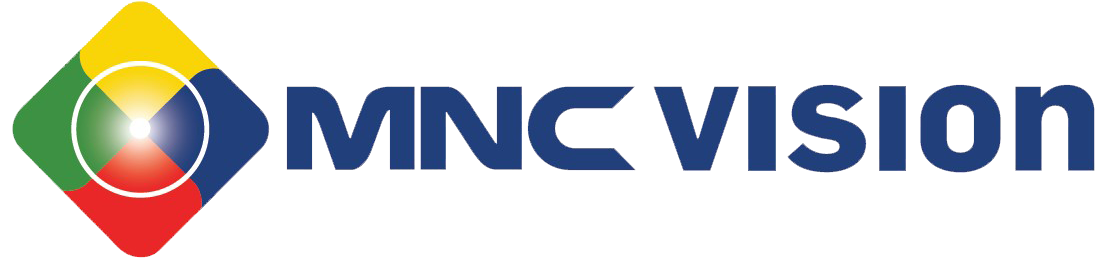
The second and final MNC Vision logo used in 2019 to 2026.

The fourth Indovision logo used in 2025.

PT MNC Sky Vision Tbk was originally founded as PT Malicak Nusa Semesta on 8 August 1988 and on 29 July 1989 changed its name to PT Matahari Lintas Cakrawala. However, it was only at the end of 1993 that that company received permission to manage the subscription television business under the trademark Indovision, and was finally launched on 16 January 1994 and began operating on 1 October 1994. Indovision started its service with a five-channel C-Band Direct Broadcast Satellite (DBS) analog service. Using Palapa B2P satellite for its transponders, the C-Band DBS service featured programming from the "Gang of Five", which was a consortium that was set up to compete against STAR TV in Asia. Indovision has had deals with Turner Broadcasting System and ESPN Asia since October 1991, HBO Asia since October 1993 and others since March 1994. Before the launch of Indovision, their three channels could still be taken by satellite dishes, but after the launch, their broadcasts were scrambled using Videocipher.

PT Matahari Lintas Cakrawala (abbreviated as Malicak) was originally (61%) owned by PT Datakom Asia, which is owned by various entrepreneurs affiliated with the Cendana elite (family and relatives of Suharto). (Note: Datakom Asia is a consortium including Anthoni Salim, Peter F. Gontha, and Indosat.) In addition to PT Datakom, other minority shareholders in PT Malicak consist of several individuals and companies, such as Henry Pribadi and Sudwikatmono. For its broadcasting, Indovision initially used Palapa B2P satellite services. The initial target was 150,000 subscribers by the end of 1994, but due to the high price of set-top boxes and rentals (Rp 1,475,000 for set-top boxes, Rp 82,000/month for subscriptions), the service was short of interest and only reached 5,000 subscribers in its first year. Then, a collaboration was established with STAR TV in 1996 to supply four channels, Star Sports, Star Plus, Star Movies and Channel V, so that now there were 25 TV channels that can be enjoyed at a cheaper price (Rp 63,000/month). The partnership with STAR TV was unfortunately decided in 1998 (allegedly due to a dispute over the lease of satellites), although later Indovision began broadcasting other TV channels such as Animal Planet, AXN, and Cinemax, plus 5 national private TV stations (RCTI, SCTV, TPI, ANTV and Indosiar) that existed since 1 October 1998.

In 1996, many of Indovision's customers at that time came from hotels (about 30,000), while home and individual customers were only 20,000. Indovision originally targeted 600,000 subscribers, but was lowered to 50,000 due to the 1997 Asian financial crisis. Between 1999 and 2000, Indovision gained around 20,000 - 70,000 subscribers.

In 1997, IndoStar-1 which is also known as Cakrawarta-1 (designed and built by Thomas van der Heyden, founder of what later became Orbital Sciences GEO division), was launched as the world's first commercial communications satellite to use S-band frequencies for broadcasting (pioneered by van der Heyden), which provided high-quality transmissions to small-diameter 80 cm antennas in regions that experience heavy rainfall such as Indonesia. This satellite uses S-Band frequency, which is less vulnerable to atmospheric interference than other satellite frequencies and are well suited to tropical climates such as Indonesia. Cakrawarta-1 is managed and operated by PT Media Citra Indostar (MCI), established on 22 July 1991. By the end of 1997, the company anticipated terminating its analog service and encouraged its subscribers to switch to its digital DBS service. As of 1999, Indovision has fully utilizing S-band frequency.

=== Further developments under MNC ===
In October 2001 PT Malicak's parent company, PT Datakom Asia was acquired by Salim Group in a joint venture with Bhakti Investama (now MNC Asia Holding) (51%), owned by Hary Tanoesoedibjo (HT). This is the beginning of HT's ownership in this pay TV until now. Then Salim's ownership in PT Datakom disappeared, leaving HT as the main controller of the largest pay TV in Indonesia. PT Malicak (Indovision) shares were still controlled by PT Datakom by 96% in 2006, until in 2006-2008 its shares were sold to Global Mediacom, Bhakti Investama and other companies. In this case, PT Malicak can be said to have only changed parent companies, not ownership. On 3 June 2006, along with the acquisition process, the name of PT Malicak was changed to PT MNC Sky Vision. However, the product name is still Indovision. Meanwhile, for Indovision's satellite manager, PT Media Citra Indostar (MCI) was initially owned by PT Datakom, but through a bond agreement, and since 23 December 2016, PT MCI has become a subsidiary of PT MNC Sky Vision.

On 1 April 2008, a slimmed-down suite of channels was marketed separately by Indovision as Top TV, targeting middle to lower-middle markets and rural areas uncovered by terrestrial TV. Later, on 1 November 2008, another product, OkeVision, was launched, operated under a subsidiary named PT. Nusantara Vision. Both were discontinued at the end of 2017 in the rebranding to MNC Vision.

On 16 May 2009, Indovision launched a satellite named Indostar-2/Cakrawarta-2/ProtoSar-2; it has 32 transponders, including 10 active transponders and 3 backups to strengthen the S-band frequency wave. It was later renamed to SES-7 in May 2010. It is positioned at 108.2° East longitude to avoid collisions. Later, Indovision has officially launched high-definintion (HD) channels which initially had two (National Geographic Channel HD and HBO HD), but currently there are 29 HD channels.

Since 9 July 2012, PT MNC Sky Vision officially listed its initial shares on the Indonesia Stock Exchange, by releasing 20% of its shares at Rp 1,520/share. At that time, foreign investors also entered, namely from Saban Capital and Creador Capital, each around 17% and 13%. Its customers also continued to grow, reaching 2.15 million in 2013 and being the largest player in pay TV industry.

Towards the end of 2013, Indovision announced that all MPEG-2 channels would be terminated in 2014 and encouraged customers to switch to MPEG-4 (HD) decoders, and change their old broadcast cards with newer ones. This is due to Indovision's MPEG-4 technology is unable to be accessed to MPEG-2 decoders anymore.

In 2016, the shares of Global Mediacom on MNC Sky Vision were redirected to its subsidiary, PT Sky Vision Networks. On 12 December 2017, Indovision, Top TV and OkeVision were merged to form MNC Vision. Currently, MNC Vision is a part of MNC Vision Networks (MVN), alongside K-Vision (acquired from Kompas Gramedia in 2019) and Vision+.

On 12 May 2023, Warner Bros. Discovery Asia-Pacific ended its contract with MNC Vision and removed its 14 channels from the platform, citing contract renewal problems.

On 1 November 2025, MNC Vision has rebranded as Indovision, bringing back the brand after over eight years, signaling the end of MNC Vision.

== Slogan history ==
- Satu Visi, Banyak Aksi (One Vision, Many Actions, first iteration of Indovision)
- Top Banget! (Very Top!, Top TV)
- Bioskop Masuk Rumah (Movies go to home, OkeVision)
- Bukan yang Lain (Nothing else, first iteration of Indovision/MNC Vision)
- Pay TV Keluarga Indonesia (Pay TV for Indonesian Families, MNC Vision)
- TV Satelit Berjuta Hiburan (Satellite TV with Millions of Entertainment, current incarnation of Indovision)

== See also ==
- Sportstars
- OK TV
- List of television stations in Indonesia
- Television in Indonesia
