= INews =

Indonesian news and sports television network

iNews
- Logo since 2017, this is the second revision of the 2015 logo
- Type: Television broadcaster
- Country: Indonesia
- Broadcast area: Nationwide
- Headquarters: iNews Center, 7th Floor, Jl. K.H. Wahid Hasyim No. 28, Kebon Sirih, Menteng, Central Jakarta

Programming
- Languages: Indonesian, English (selected sports programming)
- Picture format: 1080i HDTV (downscaled to 16:9 576i for the SDTV feed)

Ownership
- Owner: Media Nusantara Citra (2007–2023) iNews Media Group (2023–present)
- Parent: Republikorp
- Key people: Aiman Witjaksono (Editor in Chief)
- Sister channels: RCTI; MNCTV; GTV

History
- Founded: 23 June 2007; 19 years ago (Corporate); 6 April 2008; 18 years ago (Official birthday and anniversary)
- Launched: 5 March 2008; 18 years ago (Original and official broadcast as Sun TV); 26 September 2011; 15 years ago (First relaunch; as Sindo TV); 6 April 2015; 11 years ago (Second relaunch; as iNews)
- Founder: Hary Tanoesoedibjo
- Replaced: VH1 (2005–2008)
- Former names: Sun TV (2007–2011); Sindo TV (2011–2015); iNews TV (2015–2017)

Links
- Website: inews.id

Availability

Terrestrial
- Digital: Check local frequencies (in Indonesian language)

Streaming media
- RCTI+: Watch live (Indonesia only)
- Vision+: Watch live (Subscription required, Indonesia only)
- MIVO: Watch live
- IndiHome TV: Watch live (IndiHome customers only)

PT MNC Televisi Network commonly operating known as iNews, short for Indonesia News, formerly named Sun TV and Sindo TV, is an Indonesian free-to-air news and sports television network founded on 23 June 2007 by the CEO of Media Nusantara Citra, Hary Tanoesoedibjo a subsidiary of Republikorp. It broadcasts 24 hours a day, 7 days a week.

== Branding ==
=== As SUN TV ===
- Because Every City is Different (2008–2011)
- TV Kebanggaan Milik Anda (2010–2011)

=== As SINDO TV ===
- Referensi Indonesia (2011–2014)
- Luar Biasa! (2014–2015)

=== As iNews ===
- Inspiring & Informative (2015–present)
- TV Berita No. 1 (2025–present, secondary)

== See also ==
- RCTI
- GTV
- MNCTV
- MNC Trijaya FM
- Koran Sindo
- List of television stations in Indonesia
