= RCTI =

Indonesian private television network

- Logo used since 20 May 2015
- Type: Television network
- Country: Indonesia
- Broadcast area: Nationwide
- Headquarters: Studios: MNC Studios, Jl. Raya Perjuangan No. 1, Kebon Jeruk, West Jakarta; News Studios: iNews Center, 7th Floor, Jl. K.H. Wahid Hasyim No. 28, Kebon Sirih, Menteng, Central Jakarta

Programming
- Language: Indonesian
- Picture format: 1080i HDTV 16:9 (downscaled to 576i 16:9 for the SDTV feed)

Ownership
- Owner: MNC Media
- Parent: Global Mediacom|Global Mediacom (MNC Asia Holding)
- Key people: Hary Tanoesoedibjo
- Sister channels: SCTV (1987–1993); Metro TV (2001–2003); GTV (2001–present); MNCTV (2003–present); iNews (2008–present)

History
- Founded: 12 July 1985; 41 years ago (Public private corporate); 24 August 1985; 41 years ago (Official birthday and anniversary); 21 August 1987; 39 years ago (Official registered corporate)
- Launched: 13 November 1988 (Trial broadcast); 24 August 1989; 37 years ago (Official broadcast)
- Founder: Peter F. Gontha and Bambang Trihatmodjo (Bimantara Citra); Peter Sondakh (Rajawali Wirabhakti Utama)

Links
- Website: www.rcti.tv

Availability

Terrestrial
- Digital Greater Jakarta: 28 (UHF); Channel 28
- Digital: Check local frequencies (in Indonesian language)

Streaming media
- RCTI+: Watch live (Indonesia only)
- Vision+: Watch live (Subscription required, Indonesia only)

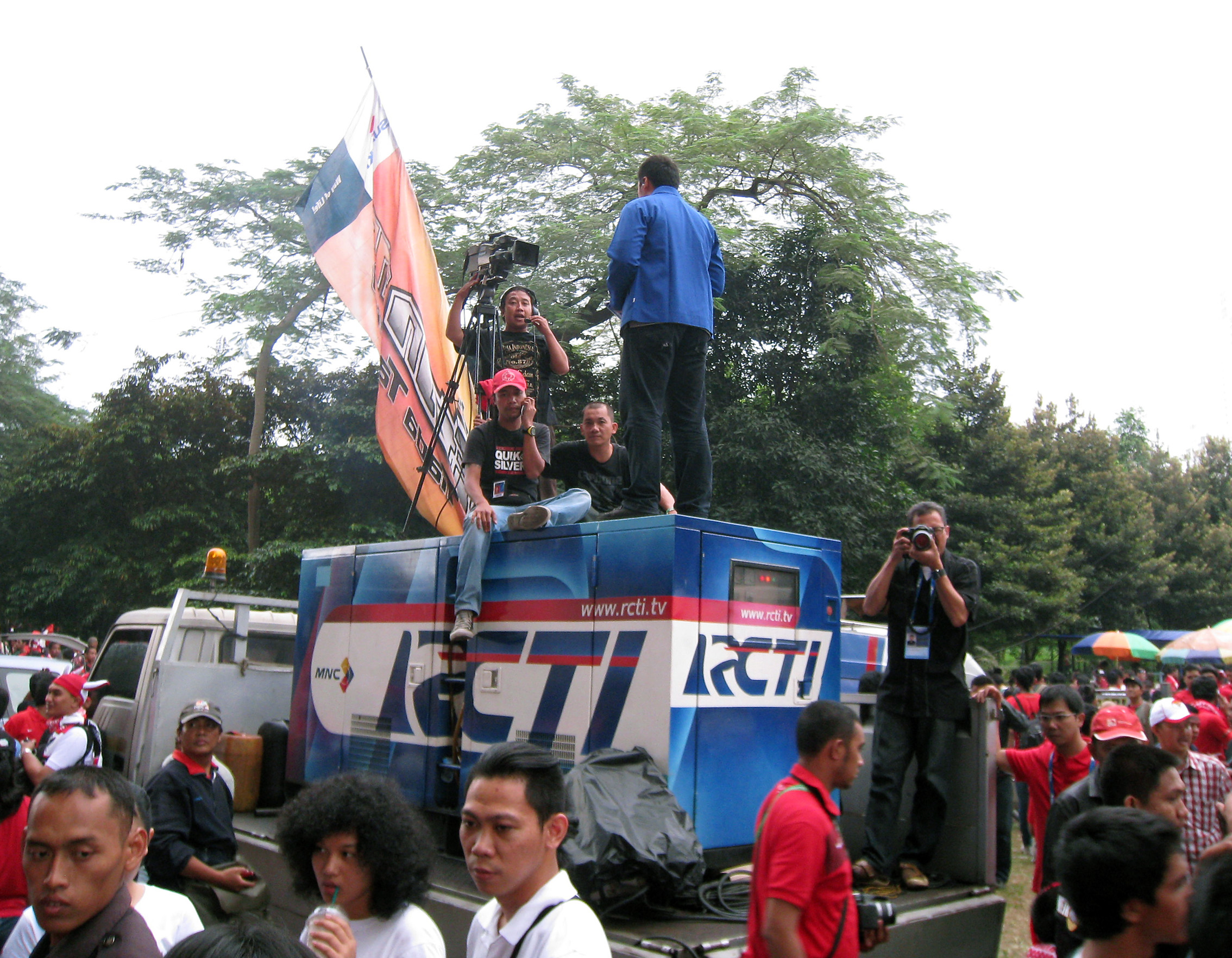
RCTI news crew in Gelora Bung Karno Stadium Jakarta, reporting the 2010 AFF Suzuki Cup match.

PT Rajawali Citra Televisi Indonesia (RCTI) is a West Jakarta-based Indonesian commercial broadcast free-to-air private television network. It was the third oldest national and first private television network in indonesia, The network is widely known for its general broadcasting such as sinetron soap operas, celebrity and general news, entertainment, box office movies, animations for children and teenagers, along with sports programming.

The company was initially incorporated as an official public private corporate entity on 12 July 1985. The network's official birthday and corporate anniversary was later established on 24 August 1985 as the country's first and oldest private television, a date that coincided with the 25th corporate anniversary of TVRI and its 23rd broadcasting anniversary, occurring seven days after the 40th anniversary of the Republic of Indonesia. Following these milestones, it became an official registered corporate entity on 21 August 1987. After four years of corporate preparation since its 1985 foundation, the network officially launched its commercial broadcasts on 24 August 1989.

The initially operating as a local pay television service that mainly broadcast foreign programming, before successfully transitioning and switching to a free-to-air terrestrial television network a year later.

RCTI was originally co-owned by PT Rajawali Wira Bhakti Utama (later Rajawali Corpora) and PT Bimantara Citra (later Global Mediacom), now known as PT Media Nusantara Citra (MNC), from which its name is derived. One of its commissioners at the time, Indra Rukmana, is the husband of Tutut Soeharto, the founder and former owner of its eventual sister network, TPI.

RCTI is now fully owned by MNC, which also operates MNCTV, GTV and iNews, all of which are private Indonesian television networks.

== Naming ==
The name RCTI originates from its founding companies, Rajawali Wira Bhakti Utama and Bimantara Citra. Although Rajawali was not the primary shareholder, the company's CEO, Peter Sondakh, explained that the name carries a specific philosophy:

- Rajawali (Hawk): Represents a conqueror of the air, symbolising strength and vision.
- Citra (Image): Reflects the effort to build a positive public image. As one of the earliest private television networks in Indonesia, RCTI aims to serve as a role model for newer private broadcasters.
- Televisi (Television): Affirms RCTI's identity as a television network.
- Indonesia: Signifies the network's aspiration to be recognised as "the nation's collective pride."

== History ==
=== Conception and establishment ===
Peter Sondakh, Peter F. Gontha, and Bambang Trihatmodjo were the founders of RCTI. Sondakh first proposed the idea of establishing Indonesia's first private television network, though the government initially rejected his proposal. Along with proposing the idea of a private television network, the company was initially incorporated as an official public private corporate entity on 12 July 1985. The network's official birthday and corporate anniversary was later established on 24 August 1985, serving as a symbolic gift for TVRI with matching birth dates across different years—marking TVRI's 23rd broadcasting anniversary and 25th corporate anniversary, occurring shortly after the 40th anniversary of the Republic of Indonesia. The project eventually gained support through his collaboration with Gontha and Bambang, and in 1986, President Soeharto approved the initiative. On 28 October 1987, following a series of consultations and negotiations in the House of Representatives, the state broadcaster TVRI lost its monopoly when the government permitted private television stations to begin operations, albeit with limited coverage.

Following these developments, the company became an official registered corporate entity on 21 August 1987. TVRI appointed RCTI as the first "Initiator of the Limited Channel Broadcast" (Pelaksana Siaran Saluran Terbatas, or SST), and the network subsequently received its broadcasting licence on 22 February 1988. The government granted the licence as RCTI was the only SST applicant and was considered financially capable of investing over Rp20 billion. Additional considerations included the company's strong capital and its ability to secure the technological and strategic functions of television as an information medium. The licence allowed RCTI to operate for 20 years, with up to 18 hours of daily broadcasting time.

RCTI obtained its UHF frequency from Telkom Indonesia on 22 February 1988 (channel 43/647.25 MHz), but not everybody could receive it, only the ones with access to a decoder. Under this arrangement, the channel was operating under a Limited License Signal (Siaran Saluran Terbatas, SST).

On 23 June 1988, RCTI held a groundbreaking ceremony for its studio complex in Kebon Jeruk, West Jakarta, attended by the then Governor of Jakarta, Wiyogo Atmodarminto. Installation of broadcasting equipment began the following month. To support its operations, RCTI recruited several key management figures, including Peter Langlois, Stephen Mathis and colleagues from the United States, Alex Kumara|id, and Zsa Zsa Yusharyahya|id. Langlois, a former employee of KCRA-TV in California, played a significant role in shaping RCTI's programming, which was modelled after American private television networks.

RCTI was initially scheduled to begin broadcasting in September 1988 for 2–3 hours per day, featuring primarily entertainment (mostly imported films) and educational programmes. Its free-to-air trial broadcasts in Jakarta began on 13 November 1988, airing from 17:30 to 22:30 local time. The trial broadcasts served as a public introduction to the network. Technical issues were reported during the test transmissions.

On 21 November 1988, RCTI began broadcasting through a decoder service, initially reaching around 43,000 users. The network's official launch, initially planned for 1 March 1989 with mandatory decoder use, was postponed indefinitely. Instead, RCTI conducted intermittent open broadcasts on 21 November 1988 and 2 January 1989. By 5 March 1989, its broadcast schedule was extended to 16 hours daily, from 08:30 to 24:30 local time.

=== Launch and early broadcast ===
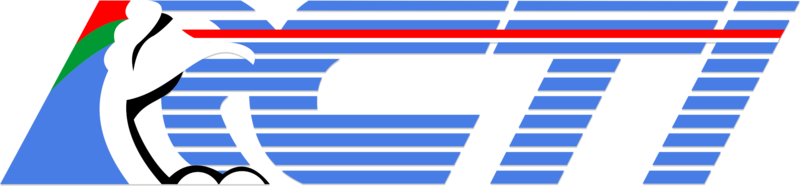
First RCTI logo from 1988 until 1991

RCTI was officially inaugurated on the morning of 24 August 1989 by President Suharto, becoming Indonesia's first privately owned commercial television network. The evening programming was launched by the Minister of Information, Harmoko. Initially, RCTI broadcast only to the Greater Jakarta area as a local pay television channel before obtaining a nationwide terrestrial licence a year later.

Before 1994, RCTI primarily aired foreign programmes, which were less costly to acquire than producing original content. This approach also aimed to emulate the format and presentation of conventional pay television, which was still a new and expensive technology in Indonesia at the time. Despite this, RCTI began experimenting with local content as early as July 1989 through a self-produced programme titled Jakarta Masa Kini (Modern Jakarta).

From 1989 to 1990, the station's subscription system required a UHF set-top box and, in some areas, a satellite dish. During this period, the system was often incorrectly referred to as a "[pay-per-view]" service, even though it operated as a conventional pay television model with a monthly subscription. In this phase, most programs seen on RCTI aired in English with Indonesian subtitles; moreover, it was the first channel to carry commercial advertising since TVRI abolished these in 1981. Its manager was Peter Langlois, formerly of KCRA in Sacramento.

The subscription cost was set at Rp131,000 for decoder rental (comprising Rp75,000 for the decoder and Rp56,000 for VAT and stamp duty). Monthly service fees ranged from approximately Rp15,000 to Rp30,000, depending on the selected package.

=== Switchover to free-to-air terrestrial network ===
RCTI's limited broadcast coverage restricted its audience reach, which in turn affected its advertising revenue. Although the company projected 200,000 subscribers by 1990, only about 125,000 actually subscribed. This shortfall was partly attributed to the widespread circulation of counterfeit and stolen decoders in the market, as well as public dissatisfaction with the subscription policy, which led to many cancellations. Despite generating approximately Rp2.25 billion from decoder rentals and Rp12 billion from advertising revenue, RCTI reportedly incurred losses during its first year of operation.

These challenges prompted RCTI to negotiate with the government to change its status to a free-to-air television network similar to TVRI. On 11 July 1990, Minister of Information Harmoko officially announced the government's plan to abolish the mandatory use of decoders for private television networks, a decision approved by President Suharto three days later. Subsequently, on 1 August 1990, the government issued authorisation for private television networks to broadcast free-to-air under the Letter of the Directorate General of Radio, Television, and Film of the Department of Information (No. 1271D/RTF/K/VIII/1990).

On 24 August 1990, coinciding with its first anniversary, RCTI officially discontinued its subscription policy and began free-to-air broadcasting on the same frequency, Channel 43 UHF. Its legal status was also changed from SST (Stasiun Siaran Terbatas, Limited Channel Broadcast Station) to SPTSU (Stasiun Penyiaran Televisi Swasta Umum, General Private Television Broadcast Station), allowing it unlimited broadcast hours. Former subscribers were invited to return their decoders starting from 3 September 1990.

=== Coverage expansion ===
Following the switchover to free-to-air broadcasting, RCTI reached approximately 6 to 8.5 million viewers in the Greater Jakarta region. On 1 May 1991, RCTI officially began broadcasting in Bandung under the name RCTI Bandung. As RCTI was not yet permitted to broadcast nationwide, the Bandung station operated as an affiliate network, carrying programmes from the central station in Jakarta along with local content such as wayang golek performances.

A month earlier, RCTI had already begun nationwide transmission via the Palapa B2 satellite, which generated controversy at the time. In practice, RCTI had "informally" expanded its coverage through a partnership with the local television station SCTV in Surabaya. The two networks shared similar programming, though they maintained different schedules.

Additional coverage expansion occurred through private parties who conducted unlicensed broadcasts in Garut and Yogyakarta around 1991–1992. Between 24 and 25 August 1991, RCTI and SCTV broadcast for 24 hours continuously—the first time in Indonesia that television networks had done so.

=== Further developments ===
In early 1991, RCTI introduced zweikanalton stereo broadcasts. Two years earlier, the station had launched its first news programme, Seputar Jakarta, which later evolved into Seputar Indonesia and eventually Seputar iNews. This was the first news programme in Indonesia to include a sign language interpreter for deaf viewers. In April 1994, RCTI introduced a teletext service, followed by the introduction of a dual sound feature later that year. On 3 June 1995, RCTI aired Indonesia's first three-dimensional (3D) broadcast, featuring the Japanese anime series Nobody’s Boy: Remi.

RCTI achieved its break-even point in 1992. On its fourth anniversary, 24 August 1993, the network received official permission from the government to broadcast nationwide. Following this, RCTI rapidly expanded its coverage to cities such as Yogyakarta, Jayapura, Surakarta, Semarang, Banjarmasin, Pontianak, and Batam, among others. During this period, RCTI began developing sinetron (soap operas), quiz and game shows, sports programmes, and children’s animated series, targeting audiences across different social groups (though often viewed as catering more to upper-class viewers). These efforts contributed to RCTI becoming the highest-rated television network in Indonesia.

The second logo used as a corporate logo (20 August 2000–19 May 2015), and used as an on-air logo and station identification (1 August 2004–19 May 2015).

The 1997 Asian financial crisis prompted a restructuring of RCTI's management after the network suffered losses estimated at Rp90 billion. Despite these challenges, RCTI managed to recover. On its 11th anniversary in 2000, the network introduced a redesigned logo, and the digital on-screen graphic position was moved from the upper-right to the upper-left corner of the screen.

In January 2013, RCTI, MNCTV, and GTV were removed from the cable service First Media due to a carriage dispute, as announced via First Media's official Twitter account. A similar dispute occurred with IndiHome’s IPTV service on 8 April 2016, when MNC Media withdrew its channels from all local cable operators due to copyright infringement and contract concerns ahead of UEFA Euro 2016 and the 2016 AFF Championship.

Since 7 November 2021, RCTI has no longer been available on non-affiliated video-on-demand platforms. Its broadcasts are now exclusively available on MNC-owned streaming platforms RCTI+ and Vision+, as part of the company's effort to consolidate its content and digital assets.

As part of Indonesia's digital television transition, RCTI Jakarta discontinued its PAL analogue broadcasts on 3 November 2022 at 23:59 WIB, following a statement from the Ministry of Communication and Information Technology (Kominfo). Unlike TVRI and several other broadcasters, MNC Group initially delayed its analogue switch-off before transitioning to DVB-T2 services later that day.

Currently, RCTI operates 47 relay stations across Indonesia and reaches over 180 million viewers nationwide.

== Programming ==
The flagship news programme is Seputar iNews (formerly Seputar Indonesia), which has morning and lunchtime editions. RCTI also airs quiz shows, including the Indonesian version of Who Wants to Be a Millionaire, which ran from 2001 to 2006. Animated programmes include Mickey Mouse Clubhouse, My Friends Tigger & Pooh, Little Einsteins, the original Aikatsu! series, Doraemon, Crayon Shin-chan and locally produced animated series such as Kiko and Titus the Detective. Since 2024, an Malaysian-produced programming begin to air including Upin & Ipin and Pada Zaman Dahulu until 2026 would replaced by Ninja Hattori-kun.

RCTI has aired a wide range of popular soap operas produced by companies such as Multivision Plus, Starvision Plus, the now-defunct Prima Entertainment, Soraya Intercine Films, Tobali Putra Productions, and production companies owned by MNC Media. MNC Media now focuses on in-house productions and also distributes titles from the aforementioned studios through its subsidiary MNC Pictures. This shift occurred after the termination of collaboration agreements between SinemArt and MD Entertainment with the MNC Group, following the reacquisition of shares by SCM (SinemArt) and Trans Media.

RCTI currently broadcasts several television series under the banner Layar Drama Indonesia (formerly Mega Sinetron), which features various titles. In the past, it also aired weekly television series such as Bella Vista, Mutiara Cinta (Pearls of Love), Shangri-La, Tuyul dan Mbak Yul, the fantasy-comedy Bidadari Yang Terluka (A Wounded Angel), and ABG.

The network also airs occasional sports programmes and localised versions of international talent show franchises such as Indonesian Idol, Rising Star Indonesia, MasterChef Indonesia, X Factor Indonesia, and Indonesia's Got Talent, which were previously broadcast by Indosiar and SCTV.

=== Sports programming ===
Coverage of the Asian Games returned to RCTI in 2023, marking its first broadcast of the event since 2014. The 2018 edition was not aired by RCTI due to exclusive broadcasting rights held by TVRI, Kompas Gramedia, Emtek, and other networks.

RCTI also broadcasts the Indonesian national football team's qualifiers for the 2026 FIFA World Cup and 2027 AFC Asian Cup. MNC Media also broadcasts national team matches, though between 2020 and 2024 its coverage was limited to tournaments such as the AFF Championship and the 2023 AFC Asian Cup, following broadcasting agreements with Lagardère (for the AFF Championship) and Football Marketing Asia (for the AFC Asian Cup).

== Other segments ==
During the Jeda Iklan (commercial break) segments on RCTI, some commercial breaks on pay television feeds are replaced by the MNC Vision Networks version for all pay TV providers. This practice began on 18 July 2019, after RCTI's signal was fully encrypted on the Palapa D satellite (now moved to Telkom-4) due to rights issues and the unauthorised rebroadcast of RCTI content by third parties.

Like other Indonesian television networks, the nationwide RCTI feed does not broadcast during the Subuh and Maghrib prayer times from Jakarta. RCTI airs the Islamic call to prayer (adhan) during these times in certain transmission areas, including Jakarta and Bandung. The prayer call is typically accompanied by a recording of Sheikh Ali Ahmed Mullah, a well-known muezzin of the Masjid al-Haram in Mecca, Saudi Arabia.

Several RCTI regional transmitter stations also broadcast local programming. For instance, RCTI Surabaya airs Seputar iNews Jatim, RCTI Bandung airs Seputar iNews Jabar, RCTI Palembang airs Seputar iNews Sumsel, RCTI Batam airs Seputar iNews Kepri, and RCTI Medan airs Seputar iNews Sumut. These local segments are typically broadcast during the final half-hour of Seputar iNews Pagi (05:30–06:00 WIB or, depending on the region, 06:30–07:00 WITA and 07:30–08:00 WIT).

== Overseas broadcasting ==
RCTI is available as a free-to-air channel in East Timor, primarily in Dili and other cities such as Ermera and Baucau. It is also accessible in Malaysia as a free-to-air channel in Johor Bahru, and in Singapore through antenna reception. RCTI remains the only Indonesian free-to-air television channel to be broadcast without subscription outside Indonesia.

Several Indonesian drama series originally aired on RCTI, such as Bunga di Tepi Jalan, Bintang, Liontin, and Pernikahan Dini, are also shown on Astro Aruna, a channel available on Singapore's SingTel mio TV 24-hour IPTV pay television service. These series were originally broadcast on RCTI between 2001 and 2006.

== Notable broadcasts ==
Obama Eksklusif RCTI Bersama Putra Nababan ("Exclusive Interview with Barack Obama") was a television programme aired in March 2010, featuring an interview between Indonesian journalist Putra Nababan and U.S. President Barack Obama. According to Obama, it was likely the first interview ever conducted by an Indonesian television network at the White House.

The interview discussed the relationship between Indonesia and the United States and Obama's experiences during his childhood in Indonesia. The programme received an award at the 2011 Panasonic Gobel Awards.

== Presenters ==
=== Current ===
- Anggy Pasaribu – Formerly with IDX Channel, NET., and BTV; also serves as an anchor at iNews, Sindonews TV, and Okezone TV
- Camar Haenda – Also an anchor at iNews, Sindonews TV, and Okezone TV
- Daffid San Opel – Also an anchor at Sindonews TV, IDX Channel, and Okezone TV
- Dian Mirza – Formerly with Trans TV, Metro TV, MYTV, and CNBC Indonesia; currently also an anchor at iNews, Sindonews TV, and IDX Channel
- Fajar Wayong – Also an anchor at iNews, Sindonews TV, IDX Channel, and Okezone TV
- Nadya Valerie – Also an anchor at iNews, Sindonews TV, IDX Channel, and Okezone TV
- Prasetyo Wibowo – Formerly with Jak TV and iNews; also an anchor at Sindonews TV, IDX Channel, and Okezone TV
- Raissa Nadia – Also an anchor at Sindonews TV and Okezone TV
- Ratu Nabilla – Formerly with MNCTV, BTV, and CNN Indonesia; also an anchor at iNews and Sindonews TV
- Rosaline Hioe – Formerly with NET.; currently an anchor at MNCTV, iNews, Sindonews TV, IDX Channel, and Okezone TV
- Ryanka Putra
- Wicky Adrian – Formerly with BTV; also an anchor at GTV, iNews, Sindonews TV, IDX Channel, and Okezone TV

=== Former ===
- Ade Novit
- Ahmad Mahadi
- Akbari Madjid
- Amalia Kartika
- Apreyvita Wulansari
- Arief Suditomo – Now editor-in-chief at MetroTV
- Ariyo Ardi – Now at GTV and Sindonews TV
- Asti Husadi
- Astrid Megatari
- Astrid Wibisono – Now at Kompas TV
- Atika Suri – Now editor-in-chief at Garuda TV
- Bahrul Alam
- Bayu Sugarda
- Catharina Davy
- Chandra Sugarda Nazir
- Chantal Della Concetta
- Dentamira Kusuma
- Dian Mirza – Now at iNews
- Diana Zein
- Desvita Feronika Bionda – Now at MNCTV
- Faris Ahmad Prasetyo
- Fauziah Dasuki
- Helmi Johannes – Now at VOA Indonesia
- Ira Syarief
- Irsan Karim – Now at CNN Indonesia
- Iwan Malik (deceased)
- Iwan Harjadi
- Michael Tjandra – Now at RTV
- Meidiana Hutomo
- Desi Anwar – Now at CNN Indonesia
- Putra Nababan – Now a member of the DPR RI representing PDI Perjuangan
- Adolf Posumah
- Joice Triatman
- Dana Iswara
- Joy Astro – Now at SCTV
- Devi Trianna
- Edwin Nazir
- Ersa Siregar (deceased)
- Yusron Syarif (deceased)
- Gustav Aulia
- Danke Drajat
- Driantama
- Fetty Fajriati
- Weka Gunawan
- Andi Iskandar
- Teguh Juwarno
- Ronny Kusuma
- Zaldi Nurzaman
- Isyana Bagoes Oka – Now affiliated with Partai Solidaritas Indonesia
- Ida Parwati
- Trishna Sanubari (deceased)
- Iqbal Faiz
- Yohannes Stephanus
- Inne Sudjono – Now at the BMKG
- Ajeng Kamaratih
- Siane Indriani – Now at Komnas HAM
- Pius Wans Mahdi
- Joni Kurniawan
- Nova Poerwadi – Now at VOA Indonesia
- Madrus Hakim
- Andhika Pratama – Now at Sonora FM and Kompas TV
- Sulthan Aqil Falah – Now at Motion Radio and Kompas TV
- Nurul Izzatunnisa – Now at Radio Smart FM
- Erika Herlina
- Astrid Novianti
- Naufal Fadhillah
- Rama Wirandani – Now at CNN Indonesia
- Mega Novelia
- Pica Wiriahardja
- Jihan Novita – Now at Kompas TV
- Diaz Kaslina
- Egiet Hapsari
- Tasya Syarief – Now at RTV
- Brigita Ferlina (retired)
- Shafinaz Nachiar – Now at CNBC Indonesia
- Zurayda Salim
- Tommy Tjokro – Now at BuddyKu
- Prabu Revolusi – Currently serving as Director of News for MNC Media and Chief Editor of iNews and Sindonews TV
- Nawayogi Kusuma
- Ledi Marina
- Aiman Witjaksono – Now at iNews
- Anggita Wulandewi Disastra
- Reinhard Sirait
- Rizky Hasan

== Directors and commissioners ==
=== List of main directors ===
No.	Name	Period
1.	Bambang Trihatmodjo	1985–1987
2.	Peter F. Gontha	1987–1989
3.	Joni P. Soebandono	1989–1991
4.	Budhy G. W. Budhyarto	1991
5.	M. S. Rallie Siregar	1991–1999
6.	Harry Kuntoro	1999–2001
7.	Wisnu Hadi	2001–2003
8.	Hary Tanoesoedibjo	2003–2008
9.	Susanto Hartono	2008–2010
(8)	Hary Tanoesoedibjo	2010–2018
10.	Kamil Mirdiati Imansyah	2018–2025
(8)	Hary Tanoesoedibjo	2025–present

=== Current director board ===
No.	Name	Position
1.	Hary Tanoesoedibjo	Main Director
2.	Noersing	Managing and Production Director
3.	Tantan Sumartana	Deputy Director of Sales and Marketing Management
4.	Dini Putri	Programming and Acquisition Director
5.	Syafril Nasution	Corporate Affairs Director
6.	Jarod Suwahjo	Financial Director
7.	Firdauzi Cece	Marketing Director

=== Current commissioner board ===
No.	Name	Position
1.	Hary Tanoesoedibjo	Main Commissioner
2.	Liliana Tanoesoedibjo	Commissioner
3.	Ella Kartika	Commissioner

== See also ==
- List of television stations in Indonesia
- Television in Indonesia
- MNCTV
- GTV
- iNews
- Koran Sindo
- Media Nusantara Citra
