= List of Indonesia-related topics =

This is a list of topics related to Indonesia.

== Communications ==
- Communications
- Internet
  - .id
- Palapa

Mobile phone companies

- Indosat
- Smartfren
- Telkomsel
- XL Axiata

=== Media ===
- Mass media
- Public broadcasting
- Television

News agencies

- Antara
- KBR

Print media

- List of newspapers
- List of magazines

Indonesian radio

- List of radio stations
- Jakarta radio stations
- Bandung radio stations
- Pekanbaru radio stations
- Banda Aceh radio stations

Indonesian television

- List of television stations

Television programs

- Dunia Dalam Berita
- Klik Indonesia
- Seputar iNews
- Lintas iNews
- Buletin iNews
- Lintas (TV program)
- Buletin Malam
- Buletin Siang
- Extravaganza (TV series)
- Reportase
- Metro (TV program)
- Indonesia Today
- Indonesian Idol
- Indonesia Now
- Nuansa Pagi
- Seputar Peristiwa
- Seputar Indonesia
- Buletin Indonesia
- Liputan 6
- Sergap (TV program)
- Si Unyil
- Indonesia Morning Show
- Jurnal VOA

== Indonesian culture ==
- Culture
- Armorial
- Coat of arms
- Flag
- Arbir
- Balinese caste system
- Bhinneka Tunggal Ika
- Indonesia Raya
- Javanese beliefs
- Javanese calendar
- Balinese dance
- Kecak
- Kretek
- Kuntao
- Pancasila (politics)
- Pasar malam
- Pasar pagi
- Philosophy
- Public holidays
- Randai
- Pencak silat
- Subak (irrigation)
- Wali Sanga
- Wayang kulit
- The Year of Living Dangerously

=== Indonesian architecture ===
- Indonesian architecture

Traditional architecture

- Attap dwelling
- Bubungan Tinggi
- Longhouse
- Omo sebua
- Pendopo
- Rumah Gadang
- Tongkonan

Buildings and structures in Indonesia

- Kelong
- Villa Isola

Buildings and structures in Jakarta

- Gambir Station
- Gelora Bung Karno Stadium
- Istana Merdeka
- Istana Negara, Jakarta
- Istana Wakil Presiden
- Istiqlal Mosque, Jakarta
- Jagorawi Toll Road
- Jakarta Cathedral
- Jakarta International Convention Center
- Jakarta Kota Station
- Jakarta Monorail
- Jakarta Tower
- Monumen Nasional
- National Museum
- The Peak Twin Towers
- Pondok Indah Mall
- Ragunan Zoo
- Senayan City
- Taman Impian Jaya Ancol
- Taman Mini Indonesia Indah
- University of Indonesia
- Wisma 46

Palaces in Indonesia

- Istana Bogor
- Istana Luwu
- Istana Maimun
- Istana Merdeka
- Istana Negara, Jakarta
- Istana Wakil Presiden

Prisons

- Kambangan Island

Shopping malls

- #Shopping malls in Jakarta
- #Shopping malls in Bandung
- #Shopping malls in Surabaya
- #Shopping malls in Batam

Towers

- Monumen Nasional
- Wisma 46

=== Indonesian art and culture ===
- Bisj Pole

Indonesian culture

- Adat
- Alfuros
- Bangsawan
- Bawang Putih Bawang Merah
- Bendahara
- Bomoh
- Dangdut
- Dondang Sayang
- Hang Jebat
- Hang Nadim
- Hang Tuah
- Hari Raya
- Hari Raya Aidilfitri
- Jenglot
- Kertok
- Laksamana
- Legend of Gunung Ledang
- Makam Mahsuri
- Malay Ruler
- Malay ghost myths
- Malay houses
- Malay titles
- Manananggal
- Orang Bunian
- Orang Minyak
- Pantun
- Pontianak (folklore)
- Ronggeng
- Sepak Takraw
- Sosatie
- Taming Sari
- Temenggung
- Toyol
- Wayang

=== Indonesian folklore and Balinese mythology ===
- Ameta
- Hainuwele
- Malin Kundang

Balinese mythology

- Balinese mythology
- Antaboga
- Barong (mythology)
- Batara Kala
- Dewi Shri
- Galungan
- Leyak
- Nyepi
- Rangda
- Setesuyara

=== Cinema ===
- Cinema
- Indonesian Film Festival
- Jakarta International Film Festival
- Films of the Dutch East Indies
- Sejarah Film 1900-1950

Indonesian films

- Arisan!
- Gie
- Joni's Promise
- Long Road to Heaven
- What's Up with Love?
- Whispering Sands
- The Mirror Never Lies

=== Indonesian clothing ===
- Batik
- Kebaya
- Sarong
- Songket
- Ikat

=== Indonesian cuisine ===
- List of Indonesian dishes

=== Languages of Indonesia ===
- Indonesian language
- Languages of Indonesia - list of 700+ languages
- List of acronyms and abbreviations
- Differences between Malay and Indonesian
- Istana
- Kampong
- Loan words in Indonesian
- Merdeka
- Indonesian slang language

Local languages

- Trans–New Guinea languages
- East Bird's Head languages
- Abinomn language
- Aghu language
- Airoran
- Anus language
- Balinese language
- Banjar language
- Bantik language
- Banyumasan language
- Bayono–Awbono languages
- Bolaang Mongondow language
- Bunak
- Burmeso language
- Citak language
- East Bird's Head – Sentani languages
- East Geelvink Bay languages
- Elseng language
- Extended West Papuan
- Gayo language
- Indonesian language
- Indonesian slang language
- Isirawa language
- Javanese language
- Jayapura Bay languages
- Kambera language
- Kata Kolok
- Keriu language
- Krio Dayak language
- Lower Mamberamo languages
- Madurese language
- Makassar language
- Manado Malay
- Mentawai language
- Minangkabau language
- Nedebang language
- Oirata
- Palu'e language
- Papuan languages
- Sara language (Indonesia)
- Sarmi languages
- Sarmi-Jayapura Bay languages
- Sasak
- Sempan language
- Sentani language
- Sundanese language
- Tause language
- Tetum language
- Tobelo language
- Tunggare language
- Usku language
- Wambon language
- Warembori language
- Waris language
- West Papuan languages
- Western Pantar language
- Wetarese
- Yawa languages

=== Libraries and museums ===
- List of museums
- Gedong Kirtya

=== Literature and writers ===
- Poets
- Women writers
- Literature
- Javanese historical texts
- Javanese poetry
- Kakawin
- This Earth of Mankind

Old Sundanese Literature

- Bujangga Manik
- Sanghyang Siksakanda ng Karesian

Old Javanese Literature

- Kidung Sunda

Kakawin

- Kakawin Bhāratayuddha
- Bhinneka Tunggal Ika
- Kakawin Hariwangsa
- Kakawin
- Kakawin Rāmâyaṇa

Malay literature

- Hikayat Banjar
- Hikayat Bayan Budiman
- Hikayat Hang Tuah

=== Music and dance ===
- Music

Music of regions

- Music of Bali
- Music of Java
- Music of Sumatra

Music styles

- Beleganjur
- Bengawan Solo (song)
- Celempungan
- Dangdut
- Indonesian hip hop
- Kahitna
- Kuntao
- Kroncong
- Kulintang
- Langgam jawa
- Nyoman Windha
- Qasidah modern
- Saluang
- Talempong

Composers

- List of Indonesian composers

Groups

- Kekal
- Nidji
- Peterpan (band)
- Sajama cut
- Sheila on 7
- Slank

Dance

- Baris (dance)
- Bedhaya
- Joged

== Economy ==
- Economy
- Bandung High Tech Valley
- Indonesian coffee
- Indonesian rupiah
  - Netherlands Indian roepiah
  - Riau rupiah
  - West New Guinean rupiah
- Indonesia Stock Exchange
- Foreign aid to Indonesia
- Inter-Governmental Group on Indonesia
- Consultative Group on Indonesia
- Taxation
- Transmigration program
- Main infrastructure projects
- Corruption Eradication Commission
- Provinces by HDI
- Provinces by GRP
- Netherlands Indian roepiah
- Indonesian car

=== Companies and banks ===
- List of companies
- List of airlines
- List of banks
- State-owned enterprises

Foreign companies

- Freeport-McMoRan
- PT Newmont Nusa Tenggara
- Thiess Contractors Indonesia

=== Energy ===
- Energy
- Geothermal power
- Nuclear power
- List of gas fields
- List of power stations
- Nuclear Energy Regulatory Agency
- Perusahaan Listrik Negara (State Electricity Corporation)
- Perusahaan Gas Negara (State Gas Corporation)
- 2005 Java-Bali blackout
- Kamojang geothermal field
- Pertamina oil company
- Wayang Windu Geothermal Power Station

=== Mines ===
- Grasberg mine
- Ombilin
- Sebuku (Borneo)

=== Ports and harbours ===
- List of ports

=== Trade unions ===
- Confederation of All Indonesian Workers' Union
- Confederation of Indonesia Prosperous Trade Union
- Indonesian Trade Union Confederation

== Education ==
- Education in Indonesia

Schools in Indonesia

- List of schools
- List of universities
  - List of universities in East Java
- List of agricultural universities and colleges

== Environment of Indonesia ==
=== Natural history of Indonesia ===
- Fauna
- Flora
- List of birds
  - Endemic birds
  - Non-passerines
  - Passerines

== Geography ==
- Geography
- Asmat Swamp
- Atambua
- Banda Sea
- Bird's Head Peninsula
- Ceram Sea
- Flores Sea
- ISO 3166-2:ID
- Java Sea
- List of Biosphere Reserves
- Mentawai Strait
- Negara Daha
- Savu Sea
- Singapore Strait
- Teluk Yos Sudarso
- West Timor
- Western New Guinea

=== Bays, beaches and headlands ===
Bays

- Cenderawasih Bay
- Jakarta Bay
- Staring-baai
- Buyat Bay

Beaches

- Dreamland Beach
- Jimbaran Beach
- Kuta Beach

- Legian
- Pangandaran
- Seminyak

Headlands

- Alas Purwo National Park
- Blambangan Peninsula
- Cape Selatan

=== Islands ===
- Islands
- Adonara
- Alor
- Alor Archipelago
- Ambon Island
- Anambas
- Aru
- Aru Islands
- Babar Island
- Bacan
- Bali
- Banda Islands
- Bangka Island
- Banyak Islands
- Barat Daya Islands
- Batam
- Batu Islands
- Bawean
- Belitung
- Bengkalis
- Biak
- Borneo
- Bunaken
- Buru
- Buton
- Derawan Islands
- Flores
- Galang Island
- Gili Air
- Gili Islands
- Gili Meno
- Gili Motang
- Gili Trawangan
- Greater Sunda Islands
- Halmahera
- Java
- Kai Islands
- Kakaban
- Kalimantan
- Kangean Islands
- Karimata islands
- Karimun
- Kangean Islands
- Kisar
- Komodo (island)
- Krakatoa
- Lang Island
- Lembata
- Lesser Sunda Islands
- Leti Island
- Lingga Islands
- Liran
- Lombok
- Madura Island
- Maluku Islands
- Mangole Island
- Mentawai Islands
- Morotai
- Muna Island
- Natuna Islands
- New Guinea
- Nias
- North Pagai
- Kambangan Island
- Nusa Penida
- Obi Islands
- Obira
- Palu'e
- Pantar
- Pasaran
- Pasumpahan
- Peleng
- Poolsche Hoed
- Rakata
- Riau Islands
- Rinca
- Romang
- Rote Island
- Run (island)
- Samosir
- Sanana Island
- Sangihe Islands
- Sangir
- Saparua
- Savu
- Schouten Islands
- Selayar Islands
- Seram
- Serua (volcano)
- Siau
- Siberut
- Simeulue
- Sipura
- Solor
- Solor Archipelago
- Spice Islands
- Sulawesi
- Sumatra
- Sumba
- Sumbawa
- Sunda Islands
- Talaud Islands
- Taliabu
- Tanimbar Islands
- Tarakan
- Ternate
- Thousand Islands (Indonesia)
- Tidore
- Timor
- Togian Islands
- Tuangku
- Waigeo
- Wakde
- Wetar
- Yamdena
- Yapen
- Yos Sudarso Island

==== Bali ====
- Bali
- 2002 Bali bombings
- 2005 Bali bombings
- Agama Hindu Dharma
- Balinese language
- Balinese people
- Beleganjur
- Denpasar
- Dreamland Beach
- Gamelan jegog
- Gamelan joged bumbung
- Garuda Wisnu Kencana
- Gedong Kirtya
- Hindu Revival
- Jimbaran
- Kintamani (dog)
- Kuta, Bali
- Mother Temple of Besakih
- Music of Bali
- Nusa Dua
- Nusa Penida
- Padangbai
- Pawukon
- Pecatu
- Pura Luhur
- Sari Club
- Singaraja
- Tanah Lot
- Topeng
- USAT Liberty
- Ubud

=== Lakes and rivers ===
Lakes

- List of lakes
- Lake Diatas
- Lake Dibawah
- Lake Gunung Tujuh
- Lake Kerinci
- Lake Laut Tawar
- Lake Maninjau
- Lake Matano
- Lake Poso
- Lake Ranau
- Lake Singkarak
- Lake Tempe
- Lake Toba
- Lake Towuti

Rivers

- List of rivers
- Barito River
- Batang Hari River
- Bengawan Solo River
- Ciliwung River
- Digul River
- Fly River
- Kapuas River
- Krio River
- Lawa River (Indonesia)
- Mahakam River
- Mamberamo River
- Musi River (Indonesia)

=== National parks ===
- List of national parks
- Alas Purwo National Park
- Bali Barat National Park
- Bromo Tengger Semeru National Park
- Bukit Barisan Selatan National Park
- Gunung Leuser National Park
- Gunung Palung National Park
- Kakaban
- Kayan Mentarang National Park
- Kerinci Seblat National Park
- Komodo National Park
- Lore Lindu National Park
- Lorentz National Park
- Siberut National Park
- Ujung Kulon National Park
- Way Kambas National Park
- Mount Halimun Salak National Park

=== Straits ===
- Alor Strait
- Badung Strait
- Karimata Strait
- Lombok Strait
- Makassar Strait
- Strait of Malacca
- Ombai Strait
- Sumba Strait
- Sunda Strait
- Wetar Strait

=== Subdivisions ===
- Administrative divisions
- Provinces
- Cities and regencies
  - City
  - Regency
  - List of cities including population statistics
  - List of regencies and cities
- Districts
- Villages

Metropolitan areas

- Jabotabek

=== Provinces ===
- Provinces
- Aceh
- Bali
- Bangka-Belitung Islands
- Banten
- Bengkulu
- Central Java
- Central Kalimantan
- Central Papua
- Central Sulawesi
- East Java
- East Kalimantan
- East Nusa Tenggara
- Gorontalo
- Highland Papua
- Jakarta
- Jambi
- Lampung
- Maluku (Indonesian province)
- North Maluku
- North Sulawesi
- North Sumatra
- Papua (Indonesian province)
- Riau
- Riau Islands
- South East Sulawesi
- South Kalimantan
- South Papua
- South Sulawesi
- South Sumatra
- Southwest Papua
- West Papua
- West Java
- West Kalimantan
- West Nusa Tenggara
- West Sulawesi
- West Sumatra
- Yogyakarta (special region)

West Java

- West Java
- Dago, Indonesia
- Depok
- Sentul

Jakarta

- Jakarta
- Ciliwung River
- Jabodetabek
- Jakarta Bay
- Jakarta Marathon

Lists

- Colonial buildings and structures in Jakarta
- Governors of Jakarta
- Radio stations in Jakarta

Areas of Jakarta

- Blok M
- Central Jakarta
- East Jakarta
- Glodok
- Jalan Jaksa
- Kosambi, Jakarta
- Kuningan
- Lebak Bulus
- North Jakarta
- Pancoran
- Pluit
- South Jakarta
- Thousand Islands (Indonesia)
- West Jakarta
- Jatinegara

Districts of Jakarta

- List of districts of Jakarta

Buildings and structures in Jakarta

- See Architecture of Indonesia

Transport in Jakarta

- Gambir Station
- Jagorawi Toll Road
- Jakarta Kota Station
- KRL Commuterline
- Jakarta MRT
- Jakarta LRT
- Greater Jakarta LRT
- Kopaja
- MetroMini, Jakarta
- TransJakarta
- Soekarno–Hatta International Airport

=== Towns and districts ===
Towns

- Banjar, West Java
- Batusangkar
- Berastagi
- Bondowoso
- Bukit Lawang
- Cianjur
- Cijeruk
- Demak
- Jimbaran
- Kabanjahe
- Lippo Karawaci
- Muntilan
- Natal, Indonesia
- Padangbai
- Parangtritis
- Purwodadi Grobogan
- Senggigi
- Singosari
- Teluk Dalam
- Tuban
- Ubud
- Ulèëlheuë
- Waingapu
- Wates

Districts

- Cibiru
- Karawaci, Tangerang
- Nusa Penida
- Sungailiat
- Tompaso

=== Geography stubs ===
- West Aceh Regency
- Aceh Besar Regency, Jantho
- Aceh Jaya Regency
- Alaban
- Alor Archipelago
- Alor Strait
- Anambas
- Angke
- Arfak Mountains
- Arnhemia
- Aru
- Arun, Sumatra
- Atambua
- Babar Island
- Badung Strait
- Bagansiapiapi
- Bakauheni
- Baluran
- Banda Aceh
- Banda Sea
- Bandanaira
- Bandar Lampung
- Bandung Regency
- Banggai Islands Regency
- Banggai regency
- Bangka Regency
- Bangka-Belitung Islands
- Bangkalan
- Banjar baru
- Bantam (city)
- Banyusumurup
- Barabai
- Barisan Mountains
- Barito River
- Batam
- Batusangkar
- Bekasi
- Bekasi Regency
- Belitung
- Bengawan Solo River
- Bengkulu
- Bengkulu City
- Berastagi
- Bintan
- Bird's Head Peninsula
- Bireuen
- Blitar
- Blok M
- Bogor Regency
- Bojonegoro
- Bondowoso
- Bukit Lawang
- Bukit Peninsula
- Bukittinggi
- Bulu Rantekombola
- Bulu Rantemario
- Bulungan
- Bunguran
- Bunyu
- Buton
- Cakung
- Calang
- Candi Kalasan
- Cape Selatan
- Cempaka Putih
- Cenderawasih Bay
- Cengkareng
- Central Jakarta
- Central Kalimantan
- Ceram Sea
- Ciamis
- Ciamis Regency
- Cianjur
- Cianjur Regency
- Cibinong
- Cibiru
- Cicurug
- Cijeruk
- Cilandak
- Cilegon
- Ciliwung River
- Cimahi
- Cinere
- Cipatujah
- Cipayung
- Ciracas
- Cirebon Regency
- Dago, Indonesia
- Demak
- Denpasar
- Derawan Islands
- Dharmasraya Regency
- Digul River
- Donggala Regency
- Dumai
- Duren Sawit
- Duren Sawit, Duren Sawit
- Duri Kepa
- East Cengkareng
- East Jakarta
- East Peninsula, Sulawesi
- Ebulobo
- Ende Regency
- Ende, Indonesia
- Enggano Island
- Flores Sea
- Fly River
- Galang Refugee Camp
- Gambir, Jakarta
- Gambir Station
- Garut
- Garut Regency
- Gili Air
- Gili Islands
- Gili Meno
- Gili Motang
- Gili Trawangan
- Giriloyo
- Girimulya Surakarta
- Gleebruk
- Gorontalo Regency
- Gorontalo (city)
- Great Timor
- Greater Sunda Islands
- Grogol
- Grogol Petamburan
- Gulf of Tomini
- Gunung Leuser National Park
- Gunungsitoli
- ITC Roxy Mas
- Ijen
- Iliboleng
- Ililabalekan
- Ilimuda
- Iliwerung
- Indonesian calendars
- Indramayu
- Indramayu Regency
- Inielika
- Inierie
- Istana Maimun
- Iya (volcano)
- Jabotabek
- Jakarta Bay
- Jalan Malioboro
- Jalembar
- Jalembar Baru
- Jambi
- Jambi (city)
- Jatinegara
- Jatipulo
- Jayapura
- Jayawijaya Mountains
- Jembatan Besi
- Jembatan Lima
- Jember
- Jepara
- Jimbaran
- Joglo
- Johar Baru
- Jombang Regency
- Kaba (volcano)
- Kabanjahe
- Kakaban
- Kali Anyar
- Kalideres
- Kalideres, Kalideres
- Kalimantan
- Kaliurang
- Kamal, Kalideres
- Kapuas Hulu
- Kapuk
- Karang
- Karangetang
- Karawaci, Tangerang
- Karawang
- Karawang Regency
- Karimata Strait
- Karimun Regency
- Karo Regency
- Kayan Mentarang National Park
- Keagungan
- Kebon Jeruk
- Kebon Jeruk, Kebon Jeruk
- Kedaung Kali Angke
- Kelapa Dua
- Kelimutu
- Kelut
- Kemanggisan
- Kemayoran
- Kembangan, Jakarta
- Kemusuk
- Kendari
- Kangean Islands
- Kerinci Seblat National Park

== Geology ==
=== Mountains, mountain ranges and volcanos ===
Mountain ranges

- Arfak Mountains
- Barisan Mountains
- Foja Mountains
- Jayawijaya Mountains
- Pegunungan Maoke
- Sudirman Range

Mountains of Indonesia

- List of mountains
- List of volcanoes
- Mt Agung
- Mt Baluran
- Mt Batur
- Mt Bromo
- Mt Ciremai
- Mt Ebulobo
- Mt Egon
- Mt Galunggung
- Mt Guntur
- Mt Hiri
- Mt Ijen
- Mt Iliboleng
- Mt Ililabalekan
- Mt Ilimuda
- Mt Iliwerung
- Mt Inielika
- Mt Inielika
- Mt Iya
- Mt Kaba
- Mt Karang
- Mt Karangetang
- Mt Kelimutu
- Mt Kelut
- Mt Kerinci
- Mt Krakatoa
- Mt Leroboleng
- Mt Leuser
- Mt Lewotobi
- Mt Lewotolo
- Mt Poco Mandasawu
- Mt Marapi
- Mt Merapi
- Mt Merbabu
- Mt Mutis
- Mt Salak
- Mt Sundoro
- Mt Talang
- Mt Pulowasi
- Mt Puncak Jaya
- Mt Puncak Mandala
- Mt Puncak Trikora
- Mt Ranakah
- Mt Rantekombola
- Mt Rantemario
- Mt Raung
- Mt Rinjani
- Mt Rokatenda
- Mt Sago
- Mt Sahandaruman
- Mt Semeru
- Mt Sibayak
- Mt Singgalang
- Mt Sirung
- Mt Talakmau
- Mt Tambora
- Mt Tandikat
- Mt Tangkuban Perahu
- Mt Tarakan
- Lake Toba

== Government ==
- Government
- Politics
- Cabinets
- List of government ministries
- Ministers of Finance
- People's Representative Council
- Regional Representatives Council
- Audit Board of Indonesia
- United Indonesia Cabinet
- People's Consultative Assembly
- Pancasila Indonesia
- Orders, decorations, and medals

=== Foreign relations ===
- Foreign relations
- Australia-Indonesia relations
- Australia-Indonesia Prisoner Transfer Agreement
- Embassy of Indonesia in Ottawa

==== Multilateral relations ====
- 3G (countries)
- APEC
- ASEAN
- Asian Development Bank
- BRIC (economics term)
- BRICS
- CIVETS
- E-7 (Emerging 7)
- G-20 major economies
- Next Eleven
- ESCAP

==== Indonesian and foreign diplomats ====
Ambassadors of Indonesia

- Indonesian Ambassadors to the United Kingdom
- Indonesian Ambassadors to Australia

Ambassadors to Indonesia

- US Ambassadors to Indonesia
- Australian Ambassadors to Indonesia
- New Zealand Ambassadors to Indonesia

=== Military ===
- Military
- Denjaka
- Indonesian military ranks
- Jenderal Besar
- Kopassus
- Korps Marinir
- Kostrad
- Paspampres
- SS-1 (rifle)

Special forces

- Denjaka
- Detasemen Bravo
- Detachment 88
- KOPASKA
- Kopassus
- Paspampres
- Taifib
- Gegana
- List of high-ranking commanders of the Indonesian National Revolution

== Politics ==
- Politics
- Constitution

=== Elections ===
- Elections
- Constitutional Assembly
- 2004 Indonesian presidential election
- 2004 Indonesian legislative election
- 2009 Indonesian presidential election
- 2009 Indonesian legislative election
- 2014 Indonesian presidential election
- 2014 Indonesian legislative election
- 2019 Indonesian presidential election
- 2019 Indonesian legislative election
- 2024 Indonesian presidential election
- 2024 Indonesian legislative election

=== Political parties ===
- List of political parties

=== Controversies ===
- Free Aceh Movement
- Free Papua Movement
- Gerwani
- Great Timor
- Human rights
- Republic of South Maluku
- War in Aceh

== Health ==
=== Healthcare ===
Hospitals

- Bethesda Hospital Yogyakarta
- Panti Rapih Hospital

== History ==
- History
- Indonesian monarchies
- Timeline of Indonesian history

=== Pre-colonial Indonesia (before 1602) ===
- Kingdoms of Sunda (1st century – 1600)
- The spread of Islam in Indonesia (1200 to 1600)
- Hikayat Banjar
- Janggala
- Kediri
- List of Hikayat
- Malik ul Salih
- Melayu Kingdom
- Ming Shi-lu
- Nagarakretagama
- Pararaton
- Pasai
- Tanette
- Wajo Kingdom
- Mpu Prapanca

Srivijaya (3rd century–1400)

- I Ching (monk)
- Kedukan Bukit Inscription
- Liang Dao Ming
- Srivijaya

Melayu Kingdom (4th century-13th century)

- Melayu Kingdom

Sailendra (8th century-832)

- Sailendra
- Sanjaya dynasty

Kingdom of Mataram (752–1045)

- Dharmawangsa
- Isyana dynasty
- Mataram kingdom
- Mpu Sindok

Kediri (1045–1221)

- Kediri kingdom

Singhasari (1222–1292)

- Singhasari
- Ken Dedes
- Tumapel

Majapahit (1293–1500)

- Adityawarman
- Majapahit
- Raden Wijaya

Sultanate of Demak

- Sultanate of Demak

Mataram Sultanate (1500s to 1700s)

- Mataram Sultanate

=== Dutch in Indonesia (1602–1945) ===
- Amboyna massacre
- Anglo-Dutch Treaty of 1814
- Anglo-Dutch Treaty of 1824
- Bone state
- Cultivation System
- Dutch Ethical Policy and Indonesian National Revival
- Dutch East India Company
- Lanfang Republic
- Dutch East Indies
- Princely Highness
- Royal Netherlands East Indies Army
- Attack on Broome

British invasion of Java (1811)

- Invasion of Java (1811)

Padri War (1821–1837)

- Padri War

Java War (1825–1830)

- Java War

Aceh War (1873–1904)

National Revival (1899–1942)

- Ahmad Dahlan
- Dutch Ethical Policy and Indonesian National Revival
- Samanhoedi
- Sarekat Islam
- Volksraad

Japanese Invasion (1941–1942)

- Battle of Ambon
- Battle of Badung Strait
- Battle of Makassar Strait
- Battle of Manado
- Battle of Tarakan (1942)
- Battle of the Java Sea
- Netherlands East Indies campaign

=== Japanese Occupation (1942–1945) ===
- Borneo campaign (1945)
- Battle of Balikpapan (1945)
- Battle of Tarakan (1945)
- Jakarta Charter
- Japanese occupation of the Dutch East Indies
- Investigating Committee for Preparatory Work for Independence
- Romusha

=== Independence (1945–1950) ===
- Indonesian National Revolution
- Timeline of the Indonesian Revolution (1945-1950)
- Bandung Sea of Fire (1946)
- Battle of Surabaya (1945)
- Central Indonesian National Committee (KNIP)
- East Indonesia (State)
- East Java (State)
- East Sumatra (State)
- Emergency Government of the Republic of Indonesia (PDRI)
- Federal Constitution of 1949
- Federal Consultative Assembly
- Declaration of Independence
- Korps Speciale Troepen
- Linggadjati Agreement
- Madura (State)
- Malino Conference
- No. 18 (Netherlands East Indies) Squadron RAAF
- No. 120 (Netherlands East Indies) Squadron RAAF
- Police Actions (Indonesia)
- Preparatory Committee for Indonesian Independence
- Republic of Indonesia (1949–1950)
- Renville Agreement
- Roem–Van Roijen Agreement
- Siliwangi Division
- South Sumatra (State)
- Tjisaroea
- United States of Indonesia
- UN Security Council Resolution 40
- UN Security Council Resolution 41

=== 1950s ===
- Asian-African Conference
- Constitutional Assembly of Indonesia (Konstituante)
- Indonesia-Malaysia confrontation
- Netherlands-Indonesian Union
- Permesta
- President Sukarno's 1959 Decree
- Provisional Constitution of 1950
- Revolutionary Government of the Republic of Indonesia

=== 1960s ===
- Maphilindo

Overthrow of Sukarno (1965–1966)

- Overthrow of Sukarno
- Supersemar

=== New Order (1965–1998) ===
- New Order (Indonesia)
- Act of Free Choice
- New York Agreement
- Dili massacre
- Free Aceh Movement
- Free Papua Movement
- Great Timor
- Transmigration program
- War in Aceh
- Indonesian invasion of East Timor

=== Revolution of 1998 (1996–1998) ===
- Fall of Suharto
- Jakarta Riots of May 1998
- Reform era

=== 21st century ===
- 2005 Java-Bali Blackout
- 2005 Malaysian haze
- Free Aceh Movement
- Free Papua Movement
- War in Aceh
- SilkAir Flight 185

==== 2004 Indian Ocean earthquake (2004–present) ====
- Effect of the 2004 Indian Ocean earthquake on Indonesia

=== Archaeological sites ===
- Candi
- Borobudur
- Candi Muara Takus
- Candi Sukuh
- Liang Bua Cave
- Sangiran
- Trinil
- Jabung

=== Disasters ===
- List of natural disasters
- List of airline accidents and incidents
- 2007 Jakarta flood
- Adam Air Flight 172
- Adam Air Flight 574
- Garuda Indonesia Flight 152
- Garuda Indonesia Flight 200
- Lion Air Flight 583
- M/V Senopati Nusantara
- Mandala Airlines Flight 091
- Sidoarjo mud flow

==== Earthquakes ====
- List of earthquakes
- 2005 Nias–Simeulue earthquake
- 2006 Yogyakarta earthquake (Bantul)
- 2006 Pangandaran earthquake and tsunami
- March 2007 Sumatra earthquakes
- September 2007 Sumatra earthquakes
- 2009 Sumatra earthquakes (Padang)
- 2010 Mentawai earthquake and tsunami

===== 2004 Indian Ocean earthquake =====
- 2004 Indian Ocean earthquake and tsunami
- Humanitarian response to the 2004 Indian Ocean earthquake
- Tsunami Evaluation Coalition
- Operation Garron
- Operation Sumatra Assist
- Operation Unified Assistance
- Timeline of the 2004 Indian Ocean earthquake
- USA for Indonesia

Effect of the 2004 Indian Ocean earthquake by country

- Countries affected by the 2004 Indian Ocean earthquake
- Effect of the 2004 Indian Ocean earthquake on Indonesia

=== History of Java ===
- Java
- Sacred Places in Java
- Isyana dynasty
- Jaffna Kingdom
- Janggala
- Javanese historical texts
- Joyoboyo
- Kediri
- Kingdom of Mataram
- Ratu Adil
- Sailendra
- Sultanate of Demak
- Sultanate of Mataram
- Taruma kingdom

=== History of Sumatra ===
- Pasai
- Sultanate of Asahan
- Sultanate of Johor
- Sultanate of Malacca
- Pagaruyung Kingdom

=== Time ===
- Time
- List of years
- Timeline of Indonesian history

== Law and crime ==
- Law
- Constitution
- Supreme Court
- Constitutional Court
- Judiciary
- Adat
- Anti-Chinese legislation
- Bill against Pornography and Pornoaction
- Badan Intelijen Negara
- Human rights
  - LGBT rights (Gay rights)
- 127/U/Kep/12/1966
- PP 10/1959
- Village (Indonesia)
- Hotman Paris Hutapea

Law enforcement

- KPK
- Law enforcement

Crime

- List of terrorist incidents

== People ==
=== List of Indonesians ===
- National Heroes
- List of Javanese
- List of Acehnese people
- List of Balinese people (monarchs)
- List of Batak people
- List of Bugis people
- List of Mandailing people
- List of Minahasa people
- List of Minangkabau people
- List of Moluccan people
- List of Papuan people
- List of Sundanese people
- List of Arab Indonesians
- List of Chinese Indonesians
- List of Indonesian Indos (European-Indonesian descent)
- List of Indian Indonesians
- List of political families
- List of prisoners and detainees
- List of Gadjah Mada University people
- Indonesian women
  - List of female cabinet ministers
  - List of women writers
  - Puteri Indonesia (Indonesian beauty pageant)
- Indonesian names
- Indonesian honorifics
- Chinese Indonesian surnames
- Javanese names
- Balinese names
- Batak names

Nusantara (pre-Indonesia) monarchs

- Adityawarman
- Anusapati
- Hayam Wuruk
- Joyoboyo
- Ken Arok
- Ken Dedes
- Kertarajasa
- Mpu Sindok
- Panji Tohjaya
- Airlangga
- Chandrabhanu
- Dharmawangsa
- Panembahan Senopati
- Amangkurat I of Mataram
- Amangkurat II of Mataram

Royals of Yogyakarta

1. Hamengkubuwana I
2. Hamengkubuwana II
3. Hamengkubuwana III
4. Hamengkubuwana IV
5. Hamengkubuwana V
6. Hamengkubuwana VI
7. Hamengkubuwana VII
8. Hamengkubuwana VIII
9. Hamengkubuwana IX
10. Hamengkubuwana X
- Diponegoro
- List of monarchs of Java

Royals of Surakarta

1. Pakubuwana I
2. Pakubuwana II
3. Pakubuwana III
4. Pakubuwana IV
5. Pakubuwana V
6. Pakubuwana VI
7. Pakubuwana VII
8. Pakubuwana VIII
9. Pakubuwana IX
10. Pakubuwana X
11. Pakubuwana XI
12. Pakubuwana XII

Presidents

1. Soeharto
2. Soekarno
3. Habibie
4. Gus Dur
5. Megawati
6. Susilo Bambang Yudhoyono
7. Joko Widodo
8. Prabowo
- First ladies and gentlemen of Indonesia

Vice presidents

- Mohammad Hatta
- Adam Malik,
- Umar Wirahadikusumah
- Sudharmono
- Try Sutrisno
- Hamzah Haz
- Jusuf Kalla
- Boediono
- Gibran Rakabuming Raka
- Second ladies and gentlemen of Indonesia

Prime Ministers (1945-1959)

1. Sutan Sjahrir
2. Amir Sjarifuddin
3. Mohammad Hatta
4. Abdul Halim
5. Muhammad Natsir
6. Soekiman Wirjosandjojo
7. Wilopo
8. Ali Sastroamidjojo
9. Burhanuddin Harahap
10. Djuanda Kartawidjaja

=== Indonesian people by occupation ===
- Architects
- Artists
  - Painters
  - Composers
  - Musicians
  - Pop musicians
  - Singers
- Poets and writers
- Ambassadors
- Governors of Yogyakarta
- Indonesian cabinet 2024–2029

=== People of Indonesian descent ===
- Indonesian Australians
- Indonesians in Hong Kong
- Indonesians in Japan
- Indonesians in Malaysia
- Indonesians in the Philippines
- Indonesians in the United Kingdom
- Indonesian Americans
- Chinese Indonesians

== Religion ==
- Religion
- Islam
- Hindu
  - Hindu Revival
  - Hinduism in Java
  - Hinduism in Sulawesi
- Buddhism
- Christianity
  - Catholic
    - List of Roman Catholic dioceses
  - Protestant
- Confucianism
- Javanese beliefs
- Kaharingan
- Kyai
- Marapu
- PMKRI

=== Javanese beliefs ===
- Javanese sacred places
- Subud

=== Islam in Indonesia ===
- Islam
- Abangan
- The Coming and Spread of Islam in Southeast Asia
- Hidayatullah
- Indonesian Institute of Islamic Dawah (LDII)
- Pesantren
- Santri
- Wali Songo
- Candi

Buddhist temples

- Borobudur
- Candi Kalasan

Hindu temples

- Candi Surawana
- Dieng Plateau
- Garuda Wisnu Kencana

- Mother Temple of Besakih
- Prambanan
- Pura Luhur

== Science and technology ==
- Nuclear power
- National Institute of Aeronautics and Space

Ships of Indonesia

- KRI Wilhelmus Zakarias Yohannes

Tall ships of Indonesia

- KRI Bima Suci
- KRI Dewaruci

Indonesian astronauts

- Taufik Akbar
- Pratiwi Sudarmono

== Indonesian society ==
- Balinese caste system
- Bapak
- Bill against Pornography and Pornoaction
- Demographics
- Government Administration
- Homelessness
- Human rights
  - LGBTQ rights
- Indonesian monarchies
- Priyayi
- Public holidays
- Tiongkok
- Transmigration program
- Village (Indonesia)
- Warung

=== Ethnic groups ===
- Acehnese people
- Ambonese
- Amungme
- Asmat people
- Badui
- Bajau
- Balinese people
- Banjar people
- Bantenese
- Batak (Indonesia)
- Bauzi
- Betawi people
- Bugis
- Bunak
- Chinese Indonesian
- Cirebonese
- Dani people
- Dayak people
- Gayo people
- Indo people
- Indian Indonesian
- Javanese people
- Jewish-Indonesian
- Karo people
- Kemak people
- Kendayan
- Kombai people
- Korowai
- Krio Dayak people
- Lani (ethnic group)
- Lindu
- Madurese people
- Malays (ethnic group)
- Manusela
- Mentawai people
- Minahasa
- Minangkabau
- Nuaulu
- Orang Laut
- Osing
- Peranakan
- Proto Malay
- Rejang people
- Sasak
- Seafarers
- Sika people
- Sundanese people
- Tenggerese
- Tidong
- Toraja

=== Organizations ===
- APEKSI
- Bina Swadaya
- Federasi Serikat Petani Indonesia
- Gerwani
- Indonesian Television Journalists Association
- Lembaga Musyawarah Adat Asmat
- Muhammadiyah
- Nahdatul Ulama
- PMKRI
- Permias
- WALHI

Scouting

- Calon Bantara
- Gerakan Pramuka
- Penegak Bantara
- Penegak Laksana
- Pramuka Garuda
- Satuan Karya
- Tanda Kecakapan Khusus

=== Cemeteries ===
- Kalibata Heroes' Cemetery
- Imogiri
- Karet Bivak Cemetery
- Kusumanegara Heroes' Cemetery
- Taman Prasasti Museum
- Banyusumurup
- Giri Tunggal Heroes' Cemetery
- Jeruk Purut Cemetery
- Girimulya Surakarta
- Giriloyo

== Sport ==
- Sport

Car sports

- Rally Indonesia

Mountaineering

- Indonesia Seven Summits Expedition

=== Football ===
- Football Association of Indonesia
- Indonesia national football team
- List of football clubs

Indonesian football clubs

- Arema Malang
- Delta Putra Sidoarjo
- Gresik United
- PKT Bontang
- PSBL Bandar Lampung
- PSDS Deli Serdang
- PSIM Yogyakarta
- PSIS Semarang
- PSM Makassar
- PSMS Medan
- PSS Sleman
- Persebaya Surabaya
- Persegi Mojokerto
- Persekabpas Pasuruan
- Persela Lamongan
- Persema Malang
- Persib Bandung
- Persiba Balikpapan
- Persibat Batang
- Persija Jakarta
- Persijap Jepara
- Persik Kediri
- Persikota
- Persikota Tangerang
- Persipura Jayapura
- Persis Solo
- Persita Tangerang
- Persitara Jakarta Utara
- Persiter Ternate
- Persiwa Wamena
- Persmin Minahasa
- Semen Padang F.C.
- Sriwijaya F.C.
- Benteng Mania

Indonesian football competitions

- Liga Indonesia

Football venues

- Brawijaya Stadium
- Gajahmada Mojosari Stadium
- Gajayana Stadium
- Gelora 10 November Stadium
- Gelora Bung Karno Stadium
- Gelora Bung Tomo Stadium
- Gelora Delta Stadium
- Gelora Kieraha Stadium
- Haji Agus Salim Stadium
- Jakabaring Stadium
- Jalek Harupat Soreang Stadium
- Jatidiri Stadium
- Kamal Djunaedi Stadium
- Kanjuruhan Stadium
- Lagaligo Stadium
- Lebak Bulus Stadium
- Manahan Stadium
- Mandala Krida Stadium
- Mandala Stadium
- Mattoangin Stadium
- Menteng Stadium
- Mulawarman Stadium
- Ngurah Rai Stadium
- Pendidikan Stadium
- Persiba Stadium
- Pogar Bangil Stadium
- Siliwangi Stadium
- Surajaya Stadium
- Teladan Stadium
- Tridadi Stadium
- Tugu Stadium

=== Golf ===
- Indonesia Open
- Indonesian Masters

=== Indonesia at the Olympics ===
- 1972 Summer Olympics
- 1976 Summer Olympics
- 1984 Summer Olympics
- 1988 Summer Olympics
- 1992 Summer Olympics
- 1996 Summer Olympics
- 2000 Summer Olympics
- 2004 Summer Olympics

Olympic competitors for Indonesia

- Yayuk Basuki
- Alan Budikusuma
- Tony Gunawan
- Suharyadi Suharyadi
- Candra Wijaya
- List of flag bearers for Indonesia at the Olympics

=== Sports governing bodies ===
- Java Australian Football League

=== Sports venues ===
- Benteng Stadium
- Brawijaya Stadium
- Gajahmada Mojosari Stadium
- Gelora Bung Karno Stadium
- Gelora Delta Stadium
- Gajayana Stadium
- Gelora Delta Stadium
- Gelora Kieraha Stadium
- Jakabaring Stadium
- Jalek Harupat Soreang Stadium
- Jatidiri Stadium
- Kamal Djunaedi Stadium
- Kanjuruhan Stadium
- Lagaligo Stadium
- Lebak Bulus Stadium
- Maesa Stadium
- Mandala Krida Stadium
- Mulawarman Stadium
- Pendidikan Stadium
- Persiba Stadium
- Pogar Bangil Stadium
- Surajaya Stadium
- Teladan Stadium
- Tridadi Stadium
- Tugu Stadium

== Tourism ==
- Tourism

Tourism Guide Books

- Indonesia Handbook

Airlines and airports

- List of airlines
- List of airports

Gardens in Indonesia

- Bogor Botanical Gardens
- Cibodas Botanical Gardens
- Cibodas Bryophyte Park

World Heritage Sites

- List of World Heritage Sites in Indonesia

Surf breaks in Indonesia

- G-Land
- Lagundri Bay

Theme parks

- Taman Impian Jaya Ancol
- Taman Mini Indonesia Indah
- Trans Studio Bandung
- Trans Studio Makassar
- Kidzania

Zoos

- Ragunan Zoo (Jakarta)
- Surabaya Zoo
- Gembira Loka Zoo

Visitor attractions

== Transport ==
- Transport

=== Roads and bridges ===
Roads

- Jagorawi Toll Road
- Jalan Jaksa

- Jalan Malioboro
- Trans-Sumatran Highway

Bridges

- Sunda Strait Bridge
- Suramadu Bridge

=== Transport by city ===
- Transport in Jakarta

=== Buses and cars ===
- Indonesian car number plates
- TransJakarta
- Suroboyo Bus

=== Rail ===
- PT Kereta Api
- Jakarta Monorail

Railway stations

- Gambir (Jakarta)
- Kota (Jakarta)
- Jatinegara (Jakarta)
- Pasar Senen (Jakarta)
- Bandung
- Bandung Ciroyom Station
- Bandung Kiaracondong Station
- Cilicap
- Cirebon Kejaksan Station
- Cirebon Prujakan Station
- Malang
- Padalarang
- Gubeng Station (Surabaya)
- Pasar Turi Station (Surabaya)
- Tawang Station (Semarang)
- Tugu Station (Yogyakarta)
- Lempuyangan Station (Yogyakarta)

=== Water transport ===
- Pelni

== See also ==
- Outline of Indonesia – a smaller list of Indonesia-related articles organized hierarchically
- International rankings of Indonesia
- Lists of country-related topics – similar lists for other countries
