= List of radio stations in Indonesia =

This is a list of radio networks and stations in Indonesia.

Notes:
- The blue fields ( ) are public radio stations.
- Unless cited, some number of affiliates/transmitters are sourced from respective network articles in Wikipedia (either Indonesian or English) without any references.

== Public networks ==
All networks below are owned by Radio Republik Indonesia (RRI). Except RRI Programa 3, which is a national radio, all networks consists of mostly local programming.

Name	Owner	Format	Stations
RRI Programa 1	LPP Radio Republik Indonesia	General	90
RRI Programa 2	LPP Radio Republik Indonesia	General music and entertainment	90
RRI Programa 3	LPP Radio Republik Indonesia	News/Talk	90
RRI Programa 4	LPP Radio Republik Indonesia	Culture	90
RRI Programa 5	LPP Radio Republik Indonesia	Music	2

== Private networks ==
Name-based (networks with single-name affiliates in more than one city/regency, sorted by ownership)

Name	Owner	Format	Stations
Suara Surabaya	Suara Surabaya Media	News/talk	16
Radio Rodja	Yayasan Cahaya Sunnah	Islamic radio	14
Best FM	CPP Radionet	Indonesian pop	3
Pas FM	CPP Radionet	Business news/talk	5
Pop FM	CPP Radionet	MOR/Pop	19
Yasika	CPP Radionet	MOR	3
MQFM	Manajemen Qolbu (Yayasan Daarut Tauhiid)	Islamic radio	3
Radio Elshinta	Elshinta Media	News/Talk	9
Fit Radio	Elshinta Media	Healthy	2
X Channel	X Network	Indonesian pop (Note: Serang, Surabaya (off-air), Jakarta and Yogyakarta)	6
X Channel	X Network	Rock (Note: Jakarta, Bogor and Bandung)	6
El John FM	El John Group	Hot AC	4
Rama FM	Rama Group	Dangdut	3
Heartline FM	Yayasan Yaski Group	Christian Radio	3
Insania FM	Insania Radio Network	Education and Culture	6
La Nugraha FM	La Nugraha Network	Pop	2
Sonora FM	KG Radio Network (KG Media)	News/Talk	15
Smart FM	KG Radio Network (KG Media)	News/Business Talk	10
VOKS Radio	Kutus Kutus Group	Hot AC	6
Gen FM	Mahaka Radio Integra (MahakaX)	Pop	2
Delta FM	Masima Radio Network	Hot AC	8
Prambors	Masima Radio Network	CHR	8
Global Radio	MNC Radio Networks (Republikorp)	Hot AC	2
RDI	MNC Radio Networks (Republikorp)	Dangdut	10
MNC Trijaya FM	MNC Radio Networks (Republikorp)	News/Talk	16
MG Radio Network	Media Group	News/Talk	4
Megaswara FM	Megaswara Media	News, music and entertainment	7
Kota FM	Mercury Media Group	Dangdut	2
I-Swara	MRA Media	Indonesian pop	9
The Rockin' Life	MRA Media	Hot AC	3
Radio Muara	Muara Network	Dangdut	4
Bens Radio	Etnikom Network	Pop and Dangdut	8
OZ Radio	OZ Group	CHR (Indie)	2
Suara Giri FM	Suzana Radio Network	Dangdut	4
Suara Muslim FM	Suara Muslim Network	Islamic Radio	3
Radio Thomson	Thomson Radio Network	General	21
Maneuver Radio	Maneuver Radio Network	Music and Entertainment	7
KBR	Enam Delapan Media	News/Talk	43
Prosalina FM	Prosalina Group	Pop and Dangdut	2

Syndicated news network

- Indonesia Persada
- KBR
- Suara Surabaya

Others

- Voice of Indonesia (general, shortwave only)
- KBS World Radio (general, International broadcasting shortwave only and FM)

== Stations by city ==
- List of radio stations in Banda Aceh
- List of radio stations in Bandung
- List of radio stations in Jakarta
- List of radio stations in Pekanbaru
