= Gregorius Sani Fenat =

Gregorius Sani Fenat (born 1934) is an Indonesian politician who served as a member of the House of Representatives from 1971 to 1977. He represented the North Central Timor regency in the House of Representatives.

== Education ==
Gregorius was born in Fatuhao in 1934. He completed his primary education in 1948, followed by seminary high school in 1953, and a regular high school in sciences in 1956. He then pursued higher education at the Yogyakarta's Teacher College, earning an associate degree in English literature in 1959. He also undertook studies at the State Academy of Administrators in Kupang. During his student years, Gregorius was actively involved in various organizations. From 1956 to 1959, he was a member of the Catholic Students Union in Yogyakarta. Concurrently, from 1956 to 1958, he served as a member of the Student Senate at the Yogyakarta Teacher's College. His engagement in student politics continued as he became the second chairman of the Catholic Scholars Association in Ende from 1959 to 1961. Since 1964, he joined the Catholic Party, serving successively as a member, then first chairman, and later, third chairman of the party's branch in East Nusa Tenggara.

== Career ==
His professional career began in 1959, when he started working as a teacher at various Catholic schools in Ende. From 1963 to 1967, Gregorius served as the Head of the English Language Department at the Malang Teacher's College branch in Ende. Concurrently, from 1964 to 1967, he became the headmaster of the state economic high school in Ende. In 1967, he began teaching at the Nusa Cendana University in Kupang. His political career advanced in 1968 when he was appointed as a member of the East Nusa Tenggara House of Representatives. By 1971, he was elected as a member of the House of Representatives following general elections of that year.

== Personal life ==
Gregorius Sani Fenat is a Roman Catholic and resides in Kupang.
