= 97.6 FM =

FM radio frequency

The following radio stations broadcast on FM frequency 97.6 MHz:

== Indonesia ==
- Venus FM in Makassar, South Sulawesi
- Elshinta in Surabaya

== Italy ==
- Radio Torre Macauda (Sciacca)

== Malaysia ==
- Hitz in Johor Bahru, Johor and Singapore
- Hot FM in Klang Valley, West Pahang and South Perak and North Negeri Sembilan.

== Turkey ==
- TRT-2 at Gaziantep

== United Kingdom ==
- BBC Radio Kent in Folkestone
- Forth 1 in Edinburgh
- Heart East in Luton and Dunstable
- Hits Radio Herefordshire & Worcestershire in Hereford
- Northsound 1 in Aberdeen
- Q Radio on the north coast of Northern Ireland
