= List of Indonesian composers =

This is a selected list of some Indonesian composers

- Javanese, Music of Java
  - Gesang Martohartono
  - K. P. H. Notoprojo (Ki Cokrowasito)
  - Rahayu Supanggah
- Balinese, Music of Bali
  - I Nyoman Windha
- Sundanese
  - Raden Machjar Angga Koesoemadinata
- Jahja Ling
- Eunice Tong
- Rebecca Tong
- Soe Tjen Marching
- Slamet Abdul Sjukur
- Jaya Suprana
- Wage Rudolf Supratman
- Otto Sidharta
- Ismail Marzuki
- Trisutji Kamal
- Trie Utami
- Ananda Sukarlan
- Erwin Gutawa
- Addie MS
- Elwin Hendrijanto

== See also ==
- List of Indonesians
- Music of Indonesia
