= Selatan =

Selatan is the Malay and Indonesian word for south and can be found in topography. E.g.

- Sulawesi Selatan -> South Sulawesi
- Sumatera Selatan -> South Sumatra
- South Cape (Indonesia)
- Lebuhraya Utara-Selatan -> North–South Expressway (Malaysia)
