= List of radio stations in Bandung =

This is a list of FM & AM radio stations in Bandung, Indonesia, and their frequencies:

Radio Station	Freq
RRI Pro 4 Bandung - Suara Budaya Bandung	AM 540 KHz
RRI Pro 3 - Jaringan Berita Nasional	FM 88.5 MHz
Elshinta Bandung - News and Talk	FM 89.3 MHz
Global Radio Bandung - Your No.1 Music Station	FM 89.7 MHz
Prambors Radio Bandung - Indonesia's No.1 Hit Music Station	FM 98.4 MHz
K-LITE FM BANDUNG'S INSPIRING SOUNDS	FM 107.1 MHz
Cosmo Radio	FM 101.9 MHz
Hits Unikom Radio	FM 103.9 MHz
B-Radio	FM 95.6 MHz
iSwara Bandung - Suara Warga Indonesia	FM 105.1 MHz
Ardan Radio STAY COOL & LOVELY	FM 105.9 MHz
Radio Cakra	FM 90.5 MHz
Chevy FM	FM 103.5 MHz
Dahlia FM BANDUNG GOYANG SIK ASIK	FM 101.5 MHz
Delta FM Bandung - HITS TERENAK	FM 94.4 MHz
Fit Radio Bandung - Stay Fit For Life	FM 94.8 MHz
Dios Radio	AM 1170 kHz
Garuda Radio Visual	FM 105.5 MHz
Radio Rodja Bandung	FM 104.30 MHz
The Rockin' Life Bandung - We're Everyone Can Be A Rockstar	FM 87.7 MHz
KENCANA FM	FM 96.80 MHz
KLCBS The Jazz Wave Bandung	FM 100.4 MHz
Kharisma	AM 828 kHz
X Channel FM SETEL MUSIK TERBAIK	FM 90.9 MHz
Maestro FM	FM 92.5 MHz
MARA FM "MUSIK TERPILIH SEPANJANG HARI"	FM 106.7 MHz
Radio Suara Indah 美聲廣播電台 / 美声广播电台（měishēng guǎngbō diàntái）	FM 92.10 MHz
MGT Radio	FM 101.1 MHz
MQ FM	FM 102.7 MHz
PRFM	FM 107.5 MHz
Mutiara	AM 1314 kHz
Play 99ers	FM 100 MHz
DB FM Cirebon	FM 90.8 MHz
Urban Radio - Hits Musik Terbaik	FM 90.1 MHz
Raka FM	FM 98.8 MHz
Rama FM G'boy Mania	FM 104.7 MHz
Rase FM Keep Bandung Beautiful Euy!	FM 102.3 MHz
Sangkuriang	AM 1458 kHz
Radio One	FM 88.10 MHz
NewShinta FM	FM 97.2 MHz
MNC Trijaya FM Bandung - The Real News and Information	FM 91.3 MHz
Paramuda	FM 93.70 FM
RRI Pro 1 Bandung - Kanal Informasi dan Inspirasi	FM 97.6 MHz
RRI Pro 2 Bandung - Teman Terbaik Kamu	FM 96.0 MHz
