= Slamet Abdul Sjukur =

Slamet Abdul Sjukur (30 June 1935 – 24 March 2015) was the founding father of contemporary Indonesian music. He studied and worked in Paris under Olivier Messiaen and Henri Dutilleux. He was a lecturer at IKJ (Institut Kesenian Jakarta) but due to his unconventional ideas, he eventually had to leave. He lives in Jakarta, and Surabaya as a freelance composer, teacher, and music critic. Sjukur developed the idea of minimax in music, with his compositions notable for their minimal constellation of sounds and numerological basis, indicating his interest in a new "ecology of music". This concept views limitations not as obstructions but as challenges to work with simple material, maximally.

His honors include the Bronze Medal from the Festival de Jeux d’Automne in Dijon (1974), the Golden Record from the Académie Charles Cros in France (1975, for Angklung), and the Zoltán Kodály Commemorative Medal in Hungary (1983). More recently, Gatra named him a Pioneer of Alternative Music (1996) and he was made an Officier de l’Ordre des Arts et des Lettres (2000) and a life member of the Akademi Jakarta (2002). Some of his prominent students include Gilang Ramadhan, Soe Tjen Marching, and Otto Sidharta

== List of works ==
=== Stage ===
- Sangkuriang (miniature opera, libretto by Utuy T. Sontani), mixed chorus (1958)
- Latigrak (ballet music, choreography by Frédéric Franchini), gamelan orchestra, tape (1963)
- Parentheses VI, low-voiced comedian, 2 dancers, flute, 2 guitars, whistling instruments, some gamelan instruments (1983)
- Migrasi (music theatre work, text by Afrizal Malna) (1993)
- Spiral, female dancer, flute, piano (1993)
- Awang-Uwung (dance music, choreography by Suprapto Suryodarmo - see Amerta Movement), 2 genders (gamelan instruments), (1994)
- Marsinah (incidental music, play by Ratna Sarumpaet), ensemble (specially made instruments) (1994)

=== Orchestral ===
- Õm, 14 strings, 1995; Concerto, arpegina (5-string viola) (2002)
- GAME-Land for full sundanese gamelan orchestra slendro-pelog and female voice (2004)
- GAME-Land 2 for javanese gamelan orchestra slendro (2005)

=== Chamber Music ===
- Bulan Hijau, clarinet, piano (1960)
- Point Contre, trumpet, harp, percussion (1969)
- Ronda Malam, (A segment in Angklung) Angklung ensemble (1975)
- Kangen, 3 shakuhachi, kokyu, Japanese percussion (1986)
- Suwung, flute (1988)
- Ji-Lala-Ji, 2 players (flutes, percussion) (1989)
- Cucuku-Cu, guitar (1990)
- Lesung, synthesizer (1992)
- Uwek-Uwek, 2 mouth explorers, 1-2 djembes (1992)
- Minimax, variable spatial ensemble (1993)
- Jawara, percussion (1993)
- The Source, Where the Sound Returns, clarinet, cello, piano, (1999)
- Dedicace-1, arpegina/viola (2000)
- PAHA for brass quintet (2006)
- KUTANG for clarinet, bassoon, trumpet, trombone, percussions, violin and double bass (2007)

=== Choral ===
- Angklung, mixed chorus (+ angklungs), angklung ensemble (1975)
- Muni, mixed chorus (+ karunding [bamboo jaw harps]) (1998)

Vocal

- Bunga, Weekend and Kabut (texts by Sitor Situmorang, Toto Sidarto Bachtiar), voice, piano (1960)
- Mais, ces oiseaux, mezzo-soprano, baritone, clarinet, violin, viola, cello (1967)
- Parentheses V (text by Chairil Anwar), mezzo-soprano, 4 celli (1981)
- Gelandangan, female voice, karunding (1999)
- Sunyi, soprano, 2 cellular phones, small orchestra (2002)

=== Piano ===
- Tobor (1961)
- Svara (1979)
- NZ, prepared piano (1992)
- Cucuku-Cu, 5 pianos 20 hands (1992)
- Yu-Taha (1997)

=== Electroacoustic ===
- Astral, tape (1984)

=== Multimedia ===
- Parentheses I-II (dance music, choreography by Denis Carrey), female dancer, suspended chair, piano, lights (1972)
- Parentheses IV, 2 dancers, flute, 2 electric guitars, violin, cello, prepared piano, synthesizer, percussion, live painting (1973)
- Parentheses III (text by Ronald D. Laing, choreography by Samuelina Tahija), coloratura soprano, male speaker, 2 dancers, choreographed conductor, flute, oboe, clarinet, bassoon, string quartet, large sculpture (by Elizabeth Gleason) (1975)
- Jakarta 450 Tahun (environmental work), unlimited sounds of Jakarta (1977)
- Wangi, female dancer, gamelan orchestra, lights (1999)

=== Film Score ===
- Aku Perempuan Dan Laki-Laki Itu (Aria Kusumadewa, Afrizal Malna) (1996)

He was working on GAME-Land 3 for brass sextet, and MIRA konserto for piano, saluang and orchestra.
