= Indonesian honorifics =

Honorific titles or prefixes used in Indonesia

Indonesian honorifics are honorific titles or prefixes used in Indonesia covering formal and informal social, commercial relationships. Family pronouns addressing siblings are used also in informal settings and are usually gender-neutral. Pronouns vary by region/ethnic area and depend on the ethnic group of the person spoken to. In addition to being gender- and ethnic-based, pronouns are often seniority-based and even profession-based.

Properly addressing people in Indonesian is important and learnt from an early age. It is common and expected to call people using a pronoun and their first name.

== Royalty ==
Indonesian royalties use the title "Sri" and "Prabhu" to address the names of kings and monarchs, usually in Indianized kingdoms which had Hindu/Buddhist influence located in the islands of Sumatra, Java, Bali, Borneo, and other places. "Sri Baginda" or "Sri Paduka Baginda" is the formal title used to address a king, for example the king of Yogyakarta, Sri Sultan Hamengkubuwono X. "Prabhu" is also the title used for kings who ruled Indonesia in the Hindu/Buddhist era, such as Prabu Siliwangi and Prabu Bratasena.

== Usage ==
Indonesian pronouns (bold more common)
level	age	male	female	Comment/Translation
informal	friends	Kamu, (colloquial lu)		you
formal	any	Anda		
formal	30+/married	Bapak/Pak	Ibu/Bu	You, Mister, Ma'am
formal	uncommon	Saudara	Saudari	(lit. brother/sister)
casual	a bit older	Kak/Kakak		Older sibling
casual	a bit younger	Adik/Dek/Ade		Younger sibling
casual	older	Paman/Om	Bibi/Tante	Uncle/Aunt
casual	older	Kakek	Nenek	Grandfather/mother
informal	middle age	(A)bang, Bung		brother, (workers)

Adult men are addressed by Bapak (short Pak) and adult women by Ibu (short Bu). This can be translated to Mr. and Mrs. but can also mean Father/Mother. It can be used in conjunction with their first name or full name. Important to note, Indonesian pronouns can all be used in second and third-person singular and even in first-person.

Example by case:

- 1.Person: Kakak mau makan ("I (the older sibling) want to eat") (lit. older sibling wants to eat). Using a pronoun (besides saya or aku) for oneself is more uncommon.
- 2.Person: Minta maaf, Bu Tejo ("Sorry, Miss Tejo)
- 3.Person: Andi kabur ("Andi ran away")

An informal way to address a significantly older person is to use Om, Paman, Bibi or Tante, which mean "uncle" and "aunt". The terms "Om" and "Tante" are Dutch-influenced and quite commonly used in the big cities.

Indonesian like to speak in a short and effective way so when speaking to someone, omitting the pronoun completely is common (unlike in English). Kapan tiba di Jakarta? (lit. when do [you] arrive in Jakarta).

== Reflective Pronoun ==
Indonesian speakers use enclitic pronouns -ku (1 SG), -mu (2 SG), and -nya (3 SG).

== By local language ==
=== Malay ===
In Malay speaking regions, such as Sumatra, some regions of coastal Borneo, and Jakarta, abang/"kakak" ( Southern Sumatra) is for "older brother" and kakak / "Ayuk" (Southern Sumatra) is for "older sister". In Betawi language (used by the Betawi people of Jakarta), mpok is for "older sister" and is only used to address a Betawi female.

=== Javanese ===
In Javanese and broadly speaking in Java, Mbak is used for "older sister" and Mas is used for "older brother". "Mas" and "Mbak" are also used as formal honorifics for men and women in Java generally.

=== Sundanese ===
In Sundanese, i.e. in Bandung, Akang or A'a is used for older brother and Teteh (Tétéh) for older sister.

=== Madurese ===
In Madurese language, younger brother/sister can be called as Ale and for older brother is Chachak and for older sister is the same with Javanese which is Mbak.

=== Balinese ===
In Balinese, older (relative to the speaker) people are addressed as Bli (for "brother") and Mbok (for "sister")

=== Papuan ===
In Papua, men are addressed by Pace, women by Mace (older woman) or Usi (older sister). Uncles and aunts are addressed relative to the parents age, Bapak muda, Bapak tua, Mama muda, Mama tua (younger uncle, older uncle, younger aunt, older aunt respectively).

=== Chinese Indonesian (Chindo) ===
In the Chinese Indonesian (Chindo) diaspora, 姊姊 Cici (Hokkien) / 姐姐 Cece (Cantonese) is used to address for "older sister", 哥哥 Koko is used for "older brother".
