= Mount Rantekombola =

Rantekombola
- Location within Sulawesi

Highest point
- Elevation: 3,455 m (11,335 ft)
- Coordinates: 3°21′00″S 120°01′00″E

Geography
- Location: Sulawesi, Indonesia

Rantekombola (Indonesian: Bulu Rantekombola) is a mountain located in the province of South Sulawesi, Sulawesi, Indonesia. Some sources claim it is the highest mountain of the island. Other sources state Mount Rantemario located nearby is the highest point.
