= Ilimuda =

Volcano on the island of Flores, Indonesia

Highest point
- Elevation: 881 m (2,890 ft)
- Coordinates: 8.478°S 122.671°E

Geography
- Location: Flores Island, Indonesia

Geology
- Mountain type: Stratovolcano
- Volcanic arc: Sunda Arc
- Last eruption: Unknown

Ilimuda is a volcano located in the eastern part of the island of Flores, Indonesia. It lies north of Lewotobi volcano and west of the Konga Bay.

== See also ==
- List of volcanoes in Indonesia
