= Buletin Indonesia =

- Created by: Hary Tanoesoedibjo
- Country of origin: Indonesia
- Original language: Indonesian

Production
- Running time: 1 Hours (Buletin Indonesia Pagi and Buletin Indonesia Siang) 30 Minutes (Buletin Indonesia Malam)

Original release
- Network: Global TV
- Release: 4 June 2012 – 31 October 2017

Related
- Global; Buletin iNews

Buletin Indonesia (Indonesian Bulletin), is one of Indonesia's flagship newscasts that is carried by a private television network. This news program is the second Global TV after Global first program. Buletin Indonesia offers material about politics, both home and abroad, economy, culture and crime.

Buletin Indonesia consists of Buletin Indonesia Pagi, Buletin Indonesia Siang, and Buletin Indonesia Malam.

== History ==
On 28 June 2012, Global TV caused a stir when its owner, Hary Tanoesoedibjo, announced that it would transform into a news channel. According to one source, plans for this format change had been in the works since June, evident in the addition of news programs (Buletin Indonesia and Kilas Global) and political programs, such as the dialogue "Indonesia Bicara" and the political parody "Apa Maunya Indonesia" (What Indonesia Wants). MNC was even rumored to have approached Karni Ilyas about joining Global TV. Many suspected this change was part of Hary's efforts to transform this channel into a political mouthpiece, especially after he joined the Nasdem Party on 2011.

However, this plan ultimately appeared to be scrapped, and Global TV remained a channel focused on entertainment programming.

After the Amazing 15 show on 11 October 2017, Kilas Global renamed to short-lived Kilas GTV. On 31 October 2017, Buletin Indonesia was replaced with Buletin iNews in the program Metamorfosa iNews, including Kilas GTV to Kilas iNews.

== Segments (during Buletin Indonesia) ==
=== Buletin Indonesia Pagi ===
- Laporan Pilihan
- Indonesia Hari Ini
- Bisnis & Ekonomi
- Mancanegara
- Olahraga
- Musik & Hiburan
- Keluarga Kita
- Sosial & Budaya
- Ilmu & Teknologi
- Prakiraan Cuaca

=== Buletin Indonesia Siang ===
- Laporan Hari Ini
- Hukum & Kriminal
- Sipir Cantik
- Bisnis & Ekonomi
- Gaya Hidup
- Miss Monda
- Jakarta 12 Jam
- Dunia 12 Jam
- Kriminal 12 Jam

=== Buletin Indonesia Malam ===
- Laporan Hari Ini
- Hukum & Kriminal
- Bisnis & Ekonomi
- Mancanegara
- Indonesia 60 Detik
- Dunia 60 Detik

== See also ==
- Global (2005-2012)
- Buletin iNews (2017-present)
