= List of radio stations in Banda Aceh =

This is a list of radio stations of Banda Aceh in Indonesia.

== Radio Stations ==
- RRI Pro 1 Banda Aceh FM 97.7
- RRI Pro 2 Banda Aceh FM 92.6
- RRI Pro 3 FM 87.8
- RRI Pro 4 Banda Aceh FM 88.6
- A Radio FM 96.1
- KISS FM 91.8
- Flamboyant FM 105.2
- THREE FM 94.5
- Nikoya FM 106
- SERAMBI FM 90.2
- Baiturrahman FM 98.5
