= Hinduism in Sulawesi =

Hinduism in Sulawesi has been a relatively recent phenomenon, compared to the other islands of Indonesia where it has been a part of the culture for millennia. Indonesian Hinduism was brought to the islands in 1963, by Balinese migrants.

== Growth ==
After Hindu Dharma was brought to the island, it took hold in many areas, especially after Hinduism became a recognized religion in 1964. In 1977 the Torajas of the island converted to Hinduism en masse. In Southeast Sulawesi, only 1.1% of the inhabitants identify as Hindus.

== Practices ==
The Torajas have continued many practices of animist nature, but their conversion to Hinduism has allowed them to keep on their traditions within the framework of an organized religion. Their conversion was hastened by the sudden proliferation of Christian missionaries in the area, trying to woo people away from their native beliefs. The practices are more traditionalist in nature, as opposed to Balinese Hinduism and Indian Hinduism.
