= Ebulobo =

Stratovolcano on Flores, Indonesia

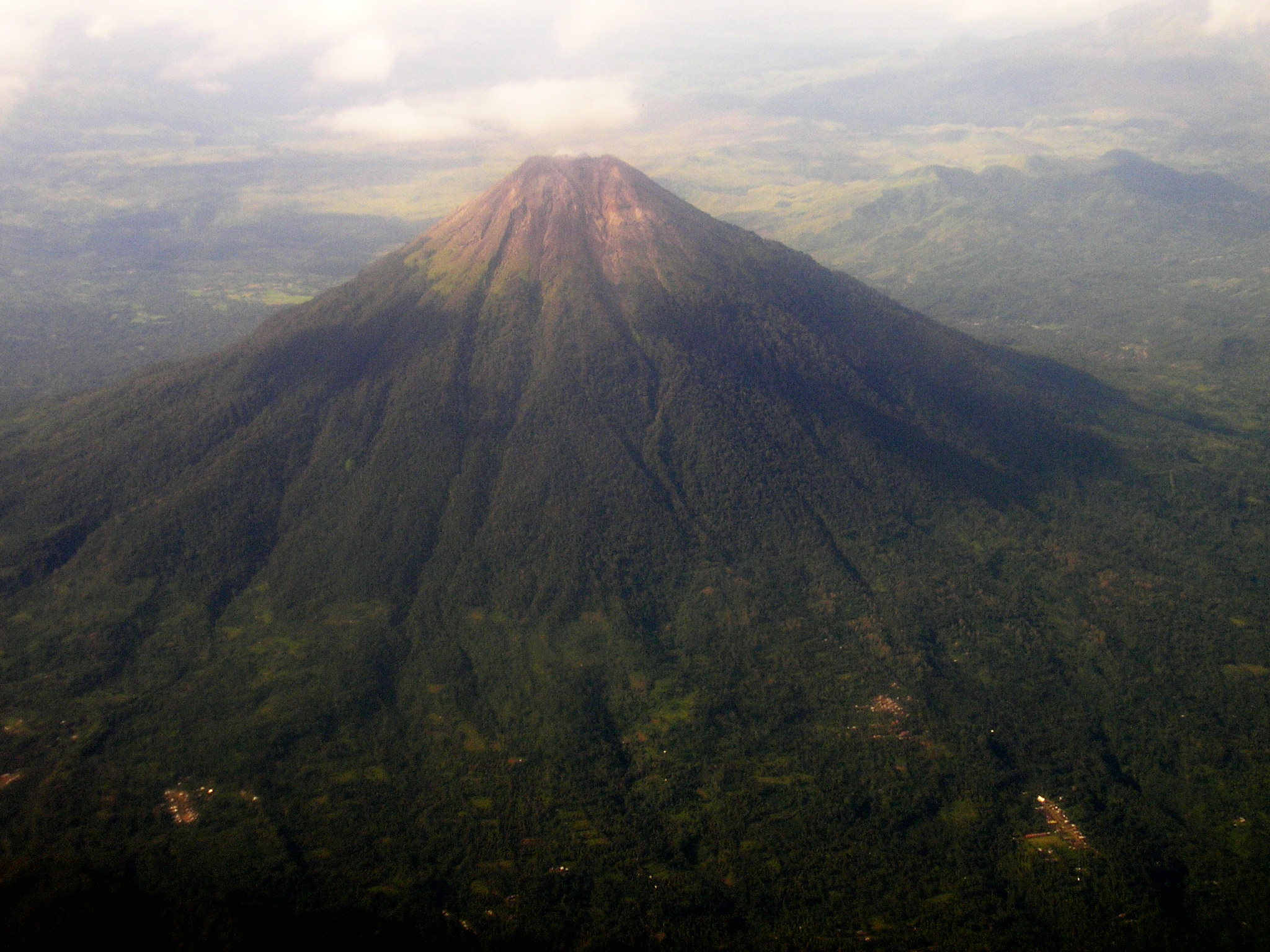
- The SSW side

Highest point
- Elevation: 2,137 m (7,011 ft)
- Prominence: 1,315 m (4,314 ft)
- Listing: Ribu
- Coordinates: 8°49′S 121°11′E

Geography
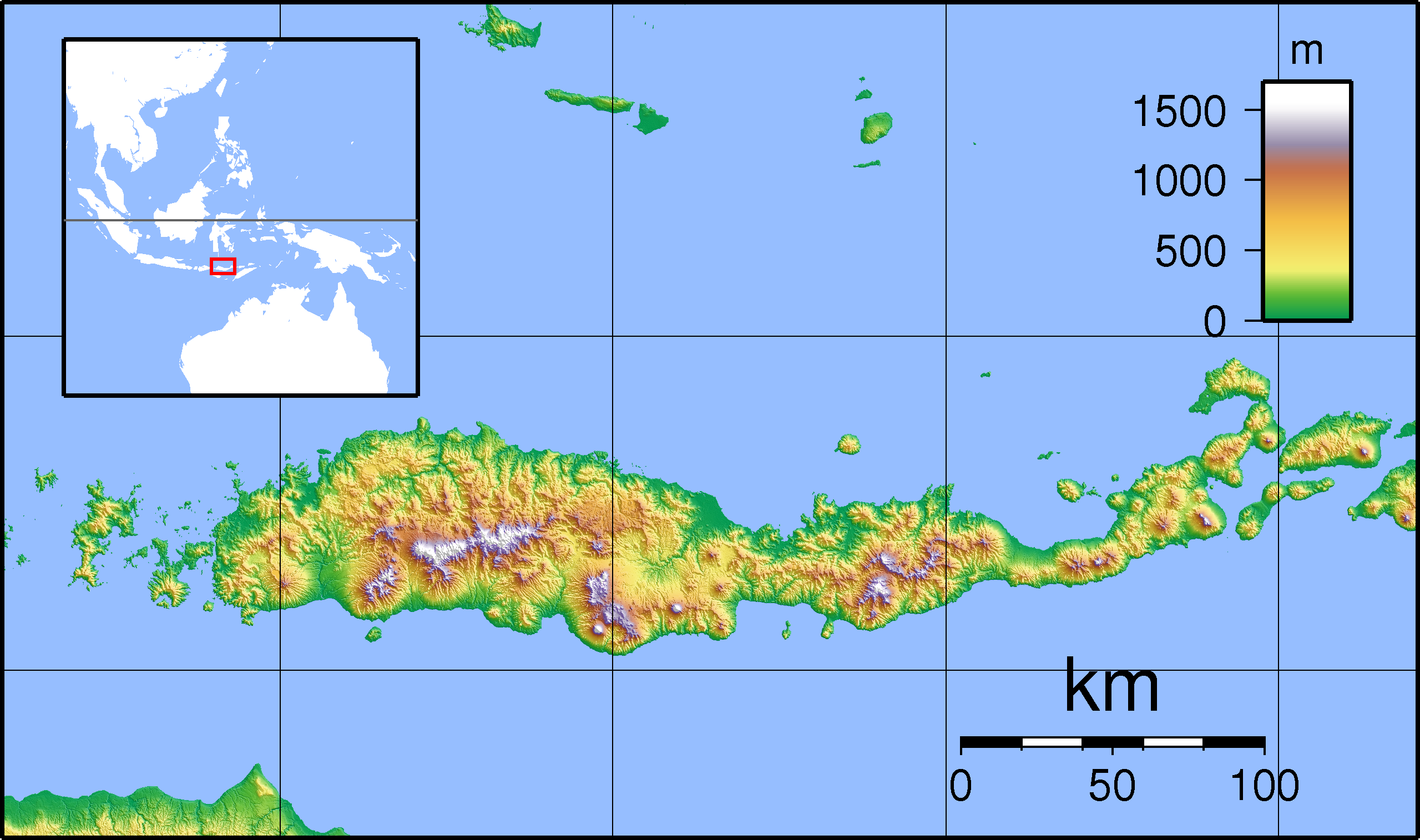
- Location within Flores
- Location: Flores Island, Indonesia

Geology
- Mountain type: Stratovolcano
- Volcanic arc: Sunda Arc
- Last eruption: February 1969

Ebulobo is a stratovolcano located in the south-central part of the island of Flores, Indonesia.

== See also ==
- List of volcanoes in Indonesia
