= List of radio stations in Pekanbaru =

The following is a list of FM and AM radio stations in Pekanbaru, Riau, Indonesia which can be sorted by their frequencies, names, legal entities, slogans and programming formats.

Frequency	Name	Legal Entity	Slogan	Format
87.6 MHz	Aditya FM	PT Radio Aditya Pekanbaru	Hits Music Station	Music radio
88.4 MHz	RRI Pro 2 Pekanbaru	RRI Pekanbaru	Teman Terbaik Kamu	Contemporary hit radio
89.2 MHz	RRI Pro 3	LPP Radio Republik Indonesia	Jaringan Berita Nasional	News/talk
92.4 MHz	Persada Radio	PT Radio Dipo Persada	Pekanbaru Trend Setter And Hit Maker Station	Contemporary hit radio
95.9 MHz	RRI Pro 4 Pekanbaru	LPP RRI Stasiun Pekanbaru	Suara Budaya Pekanbaru	Culture, Dangdut
98.3 MHz	SmartFM	PT Radio Mona Ria	The Spirit Of Indonesia	News/talk (Business), Music radio
99.1 MHz	RRI Pro 1 Pekanbaru	LPP RRI Stasiun Pekanbaru	Kanal Informasi Dan Inspirasi	General
101.0 MHz	CBS 101 FM	PT Radio Cynthia Utama	Today's Best Music	Music radio
102.6 MHz	Cendana FM	PT Radio Cendana FM Pekanbaru	Tourism - Business - Lifestyle	Music radio
107.8 MHz	Shalom FM	Radio Komunitas Shalom HKBP Rumbai	Boan Sadanari	Contemporary Christian music
