= Lintas iNews =

Indonesian television news program

- Created by: Hary Tanoesoedibjo
- Presented by: See Presenters
- Theme music composer: Dhani Vicky Rinaldi
- Country of origin: Indonesia
- Original language: Indonesian

Production
- Executive producers: Lintas iNews Siang: Salman Ibnu Hasky
- Producers: iNews Division: Syafril Nasution (Person in Charge); Aiman Witjaksono (Editor in Chief); Soemiadeny; Dedi Prasetia Sitem (Deputy Editor in Chief); Lintas iNews Siang: Rahmat Efendi; Gigih Irvan; Noval Maulana
- Camera setup: Multi-camera setup
- Running time: 30-60 minutes
- Production companies: iNews Media Group; MNCTV

Original release
- Network: MNCTV; Sindonews TV (relay, "Siang" only)
- Release: 1 November 2017 – present

Lintas iNews (iNews Across), is an Indonesian news programme which broadcast on MNCTV, replacing Lintas from 1995 to 2017. The program broadcast for one hours each day through Lintas iNews Siang (lunchtime news), Lintas iNews (headline news), and Breaking iNews (breaking news, different coverage with iNews).

== Timeslots List ==
=== Lintas iNews Daerah ===
- Everyday, 05.00 WIB - 05.30 WIB

(for outside Jakarta and Banten only)

=== Lintas iNews Siang ===
- Weekday, 12.15 WIB - 12.30 WIB

=== Lintas iNews ===
- Everyday, five times a day

=== Breaking iNews ===
- Everyday, rarely

== See also ==
- Seputar iNews
- Buletin iNews
- iNews
- Sindo
