= Jalan Jaksa =

Street in Jakarta, Indonesia

Coordinates: 6°11′10″S 106°49′44″E

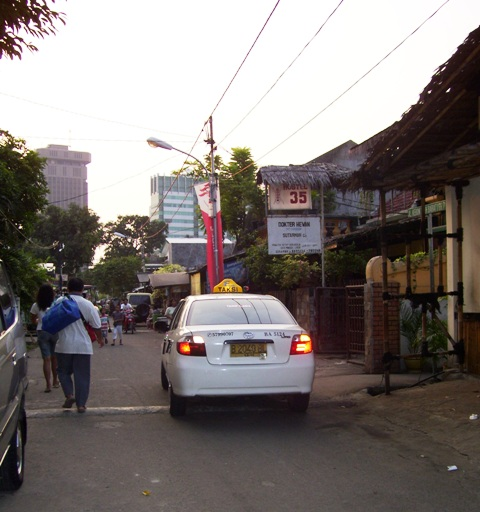
- Interactive map of Jalan Jaksa
- Owner: Pemprov DKI Jakarta
- Maintained by: Dinas Pekerjaan Umum DKI Jakarta
- Length: 0.4 km (0.25 mi)
- Location: Central Jakarta
- From: Jalan Kebon Sirih
- To: Jalan KH Wahid Hasyim

Jalan Jaksa (abbreviated as Jl. Jaksa) is a short street approximately 400 meters long at Menteng subdistrict in Central Jakarta, Indonesia. It is located about 1 km south of the national museum, Monas and west of the Gondangdia railway station. The street connects Jalan KH Wahid Hasyim to Jalan Kebon Sirih. The six-meter-wide road offers tourists the opportunity to get cheap accommodation, and used to be a hub for nightlife, however, for several years now the nightlife scene here has dwindled with tourists and locals gravitating towards newer areas. It was designed as the main choice of foreign as well as domestic backpackers who visited Jakarta until around 2016.

== History ==
In Indonesian language Jaksa means attorney. During Dutch colonial period it was a gathering place for law students from Rechts Hogeoschool. In the late 1960s Jl. Jaksa started to become internationally known among backpackers though the International Youth Hostel Federation (IYHF). In 1968, Nathanael Lawalata the secretary general of the Association of Indonesian Youth Hostels, converted his house into a hotel to establish the Wisma Delima. This was not only the first hotel in Jl Jaksa but also the only hotel in Jakarta that was internationally listed by the IYHF. In 1993, the Jakarta Tourism Office stated that 57,201 foreign tourists had visited hotels and hostels in the street and the surrounding area, including 29,676 Europeans, 9,309 Australians, 4,215 Americans and 649 Africans.

On 5–7 August 1994, the first annual Jaksa street festival was held. The street festival aimed to increase the popularity of street and simultaneously celebrate the culture of indigenous Jakarta residents, known as the Betawi people. The 1998 monetary crisis, the 2002 Bali bombings, the 2004 Jakarta embassy bombing and the decision in 2005 to reduce the standard tourist visa from 60 to 30 days have reduced the number of budget tourist numbers at Jalan Jaksa. Many backpackers decided to stay directly in the other parts of Indonesia instead of spending 10% of their 30-day visa in Jakarta.

Locals on the street have taken measures to prevent Islamic radicals from intimidating tourists during sweeps, which were threatened in the early 2000s . Jl Jaksa is still the main budget accommodation and low budget entertainment street in Jakarta.

== Attractions ==
Though the street is nowhere near as touristy, modern or developed as that of Kuta, Bali or the Khaosan Road in Bangkok, it still remains popular among backpackers. Tourists choose to stay at Jalan Jaksa because they can blend with local culture and feel the atmosphere of downtown Jakarta in a comfortable, but affordable way with facilities including travel agencies, second-hand bookstores, money changers, laundries, pubs, etc. The location of Jalan Jaksa is in the city center also makes it easier to explore the tourist attractions in Jakarta. The street is not only a place for backpackers but it is also a gathering place for expats living nearby.

There are also plenty of shops, hotels, offices, and restaurants at Jalan Wahid Hasim, Jalan Sabang (Jl. Agus Salim street), Teuku Cik Di Tiro Street, Jalan Kebon Sirih and Menteng Raya Street, those are adjacent to Jalan Jaksa. Jalan Sabang is a popular culinary destination in Jakarta.

== See also ==
- Menteng
- Monas
