= Lagundri Bay =

Bay in Nias, Indonesia

Coordinates: 0.56978°N 97.72957°E

Lagundri Bay, or Sorake Bay, is a horseshoe-shaped bay at the southern end of the island of Nias off the coast of Sumatra in Indonesia. It is a popular tourist destination and a noted surf break.

== Lagundri Bay surf break ==
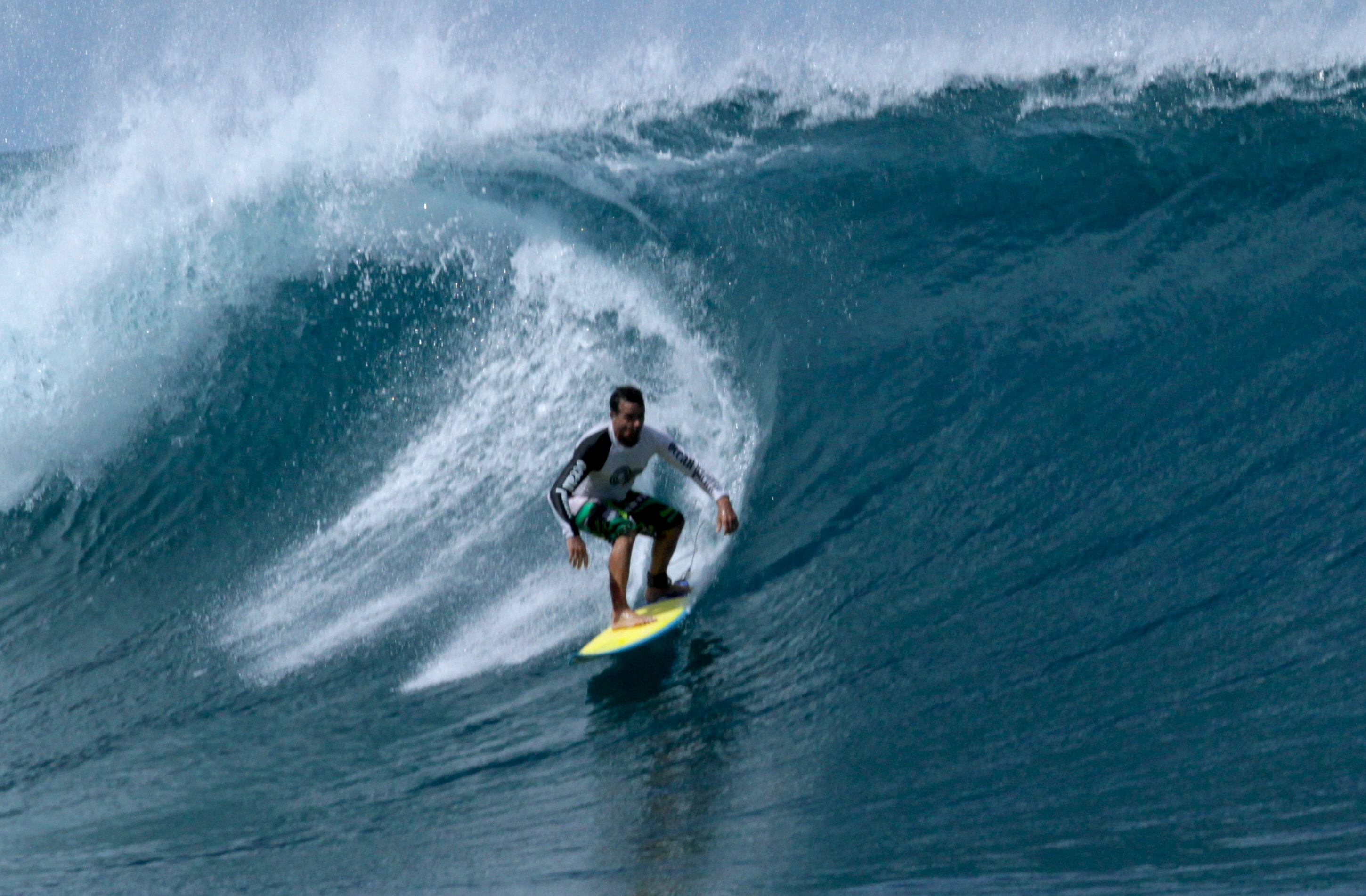
Surfing activity in Lagundri Beach
