= Arnhemia =

Coordinates: 3°28′N 98°36′E

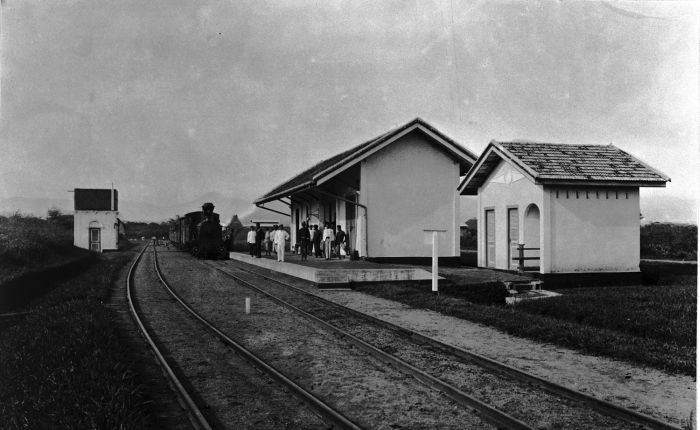
The train station of the Deli Railway Company at Arnhemia (c. 1920)

Arnhemia is a town in Deli Serdang Regency, North Sumatra, Indonesia.
