= Homelessness in Indonesia =

Issue in Indonesia

Homelessness in Indonesia refers to the issue of homelessness, a condition wherein people lack a stable and appropriate place of housing. The number of homeless people in Indonesia is estimated to be up to 3 million people in the country, over 28,000 in Jakarta alone. A number of terms are used to describe homeless people in Indonesia, including tunawisma, which is used by the government, and gelandangan, meaning "tramp".

Squatters and street homeless people are often targeted by police raids who cite the reason being the homeless people "disturb the attractiveness of the city". Every day, they beg in the city on the intersection of roads, and wearing costumes to hide from targeted police.

== Forced evictions ==
One cause of homelessness in Indonesia is forced evictions. According to researchers, between the years 2000 and 2005 over 92,000 people were forcefully evicted from their homes.

== See also ==
- Homelessness
- Street children in Indonesia
