= Inielika =

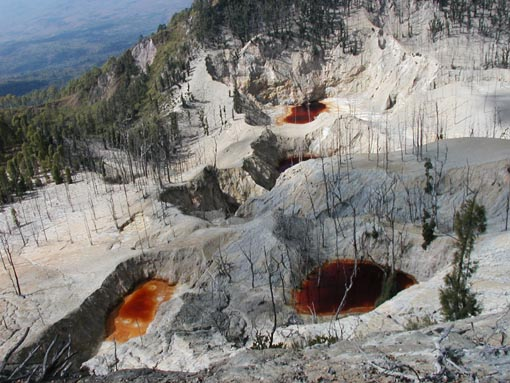

Highest point
- Elevation: 1,559 m (5,115 ft)
- Coordinates: 8.73°S 120.98°E

Geography
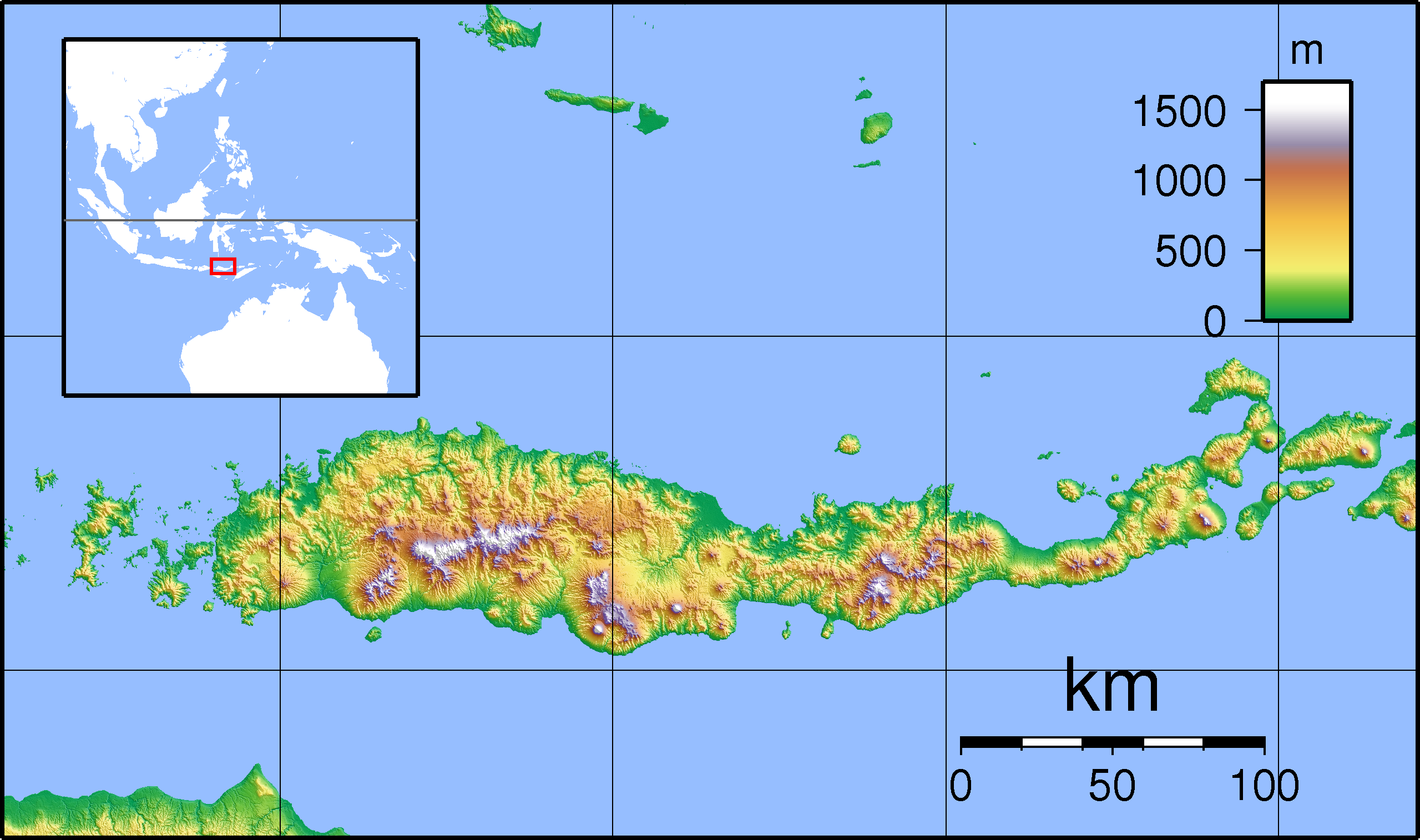
- Location within Flores
- Location: Flores Island, Indonesia

Geology
- Mountain type: Complex volcano
- Volcanic arc: Sunda Arc
- Last eruption: January to March 2001

Inielika is a volcano located in the central part of the island of Flores, Indonesia, north of the city of Bajawa.
