= Buletin iNews =

Indonesian television news program

- Created by: Hary Tanoesoedibjo
- Presented by: See Presenters
- Theme music composer: Dhani Vicky Rinaldi
- Country of origin: Indonesia
- Original language: Indonesian

Production
- Executive producers: Buletin iNews Pagi: Marleini Rizky Utami
- Producers: iNews Division: Syafril Nasution (Person in Charge); Aiman Witjaksono (Editor in Chief); Soemiadeny (Deputy Editor in Chief); Buletin iNews Pagi: Heru; Monda
- Camera setup: Multi-camera setup
- Running time: 30 minutes (Buletin iNews Pagi)
- Production companies: iNews Media Group; GTV

Original release
- Network: GTV; Sindonews TV (relay, only)
- Release: 1 November 2017 – present

Related
- Buletin Indonesia

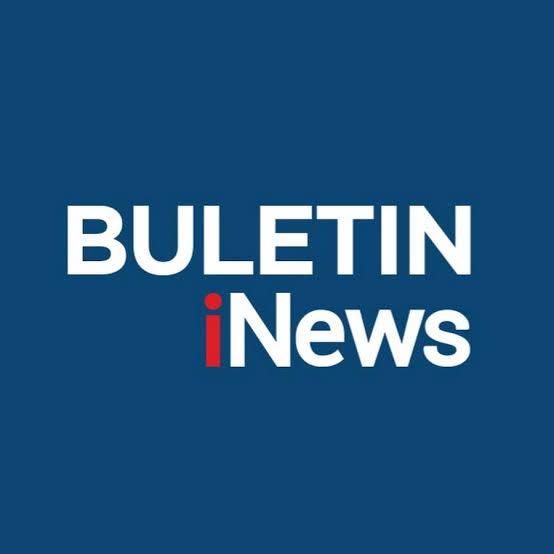

Buletin iNews is an Indonesian flagship news programme which broadcast on GTV, replacing Buletin Indonesia from 2012 to 2017. The program broadcast for one hours each day through Buletin iNews Pagi (breakfast news), Kilas iNews (headline news) and Breaking iNews (breaking news, different coverage with iNews).

== Timeslots List ==
=== Buletin iNews Pagi ===
- Everyday, 06:00 WIB - 06:30 WIB

=== Kilas iNews ===
- Everyday, five times a day

=== Breaking iNews ===
- Everyday, rarely

== See also ==
- Seputar iNews
- Lintas iNews
- iNews
- Sindo
