= Mount Latimojong =

Mountain in Indonesia

Latimojong
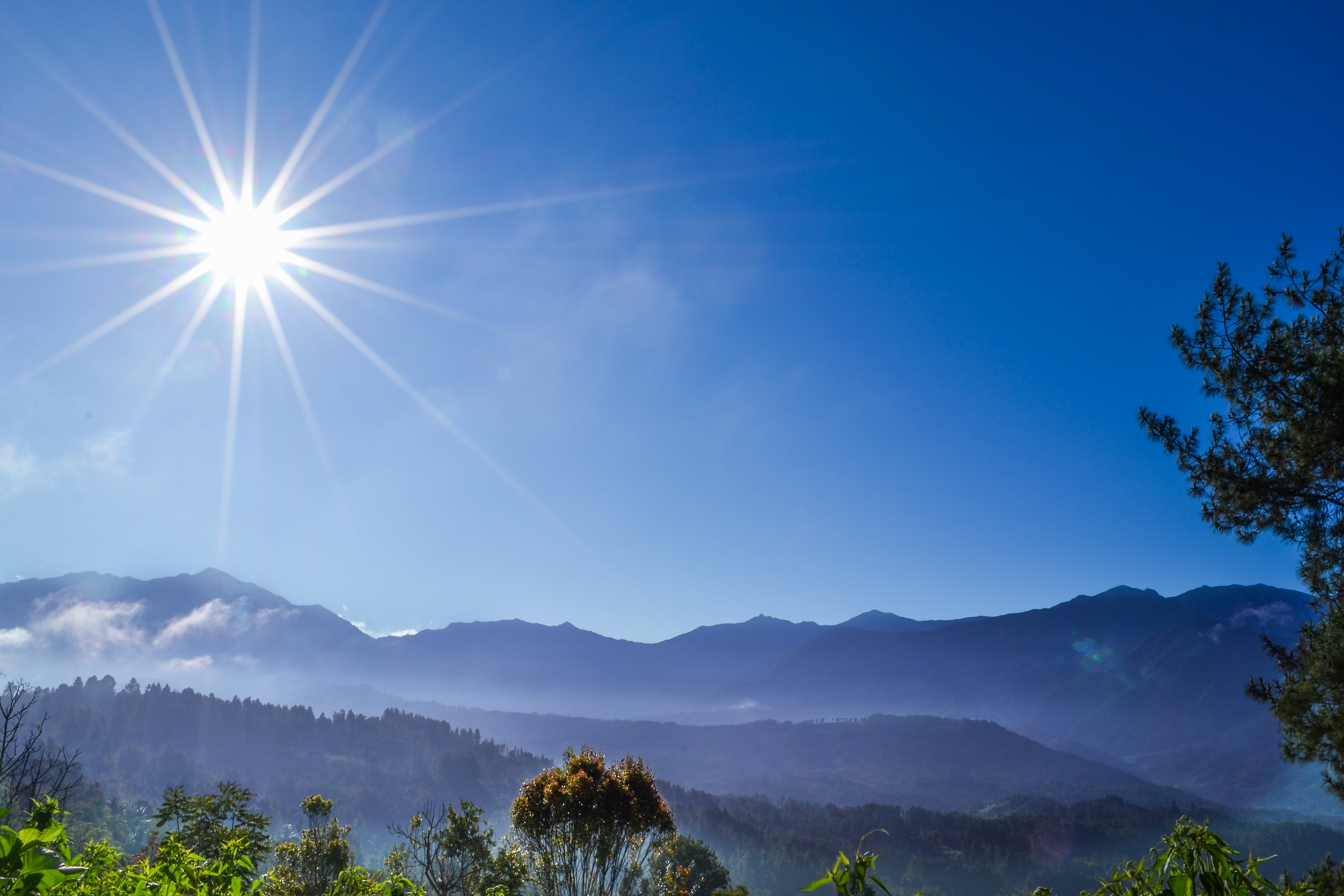

Highest point
- Elevation: 3,478 m (11,411 ft)
- Prominence: 3,478 m (11,411 ft); Ranked 52nd
- Listing: Island high point Ultra; Ribu
- Coordinates: 3°23′06″S 120°01′27″E

Geography
- Location within Sulawesi
- Location: Sulawesi, Indonesia

Latimojong (Indonesian: Gunung Latimojong), also known by its peak name Rantemario, is a mountain located in the province of South Sulawesi, Sulawesi, Indonesia. At 3,478 metres (11,411 ft), it is the highest mountain on the island, although some sources state Mount Rantekombola as the highest point.

Locally, Rantemario is more commonly referred to as Latimojong. Latimojong is also the name of local mountain range and forest area of which Rantemario is the highest peak.

Rantemario can be climbed from the village of Karangan and has eight designated staging points, some of which are suitable for camping and have access to water. The nearest town is Baraka, 8 km off the main highway between Makassar and Tana Toraja.

== See also ==
- List of islands by highest point
- List of peaks by prominence
- List of ultras of the Malay Archipelago
