= Ililabalekan =

Stratovolcano in the south-central part of Lembata, Indonesia

- Location within Lesser Sunda Islands

Highest point
- Elevation: 1,018 m (3,340 ft)
- Listing: Ribu
- Coordinates: 8.55°S 123.38°E

Geography
- Location: Lembata Island, Indonesia

Geology
- Mountain type: Stratovolcano
- Volcanic arc: Sunda Arc
- Last eruption: Unknown

Ililabalekan volcano is located on a notable peninsula within the southwestern region of Lembata Island which is a part of Indonesia, previously known as Lomblen Island. On the southeastern slope of this steep-sided Volcano, a satellite cone has formed. The summit of Mount Labalekan features four craters, including one that harbors a lava dome and two smaller explosion pits. While there is no recorded history of eruptions from this volcano, it does exhibit fumaroles near its summit.

== See also ==
- List of volcanoes in Indonesia
