= Jakarta Tower =

Coordinates: 6°8′48.5″S 106°51′15.6″E

- Interactive map of the Jakarta Tower area

General information
- Status: On hold
- Type: Communications, observation, mixed use, tourism
- Location: Kemayoran, Jakarta, Indonesia
- Construction started: 1997
- Cost: estimated IDR 3 trillion (US$251.7 million)

Height
- Top floor: 558 m (1,830.7 ft)
- Observatory: 395.5 m (1,297.6 ft)

Design and construction
- Architect: ECADI

The Jakarta Tower (Menara Jakarta) is a partially-built tower in Jakarta, Indonesia. If completed, it will stand 558 metres (1,831 ft) tall up to the antenna and would be the tallest freestanding tower in the Southern Hemisphere. In Kemayoran, Central Jakarta, work was initially started in 1997, but was halted by the Asian economic crisis. As of 2015, the project is still on hold.

== History ==
The Suharto regime intended Jakarta Tower to be the tallest structure in the world. International architecture design firms were invited to propose designs for the structure. The design itself should represent Trilogi Pembangunan (government's national development philosophy), Pancasila (the national philosophy, which consists of five factors), and August 17 (Indonesia's independence day). The winning design was created by Murphi/Iohn from the United States. However, since the design was too costly to develop, the government opted the runner-up design by East China Architecture Design & Research Institute (ECADI), who created the Shanghai Oriental Pearl Tower in China.

The development of the tower was initially developed by Sudwikatmono, Prajogo Pangestu and Henry Pribadi, operated by the company, PT Indocitra Graha Bawana. Its cost was estimated around US$400 million (at that time, around Rp 900 billion).

Originally, the Jakarta Tower was to be built in the Kuningan area, but Soerjadi Soedirdja, the Governor of Special Capital District of Jakarta at that time, did not agree, and proposed to build it in the Kemayoran area that was still underdeveloped.

Design companies of international calibre architecture were invited to participate in the design contest of architecture for this building. The provisions of this contest were that this building must contain the symbol of the Trilogy of the Development, Pancasila (the five basic Principles of Republic of Indonesia) and on August 17 (the Republic of Indonesia independence day declaration). The design and the scale model of the tower were shown to the Secretary of State, Moerdiono (at that time) as Chairman of Organizer Agency and the Development of the Bandar Kemayoran Baru in the Secretariat of the Country.

In 1996, this contest was won by Murphi/Jahn from the United States. Only, because this design was too expensive to be developed, then the government chose the design from the second winner namely East China Architecture Design & Research Institute (ECADI), that also constructive Shanghai Oriental Pearl Tower in China. This ECADI design was chosen because the juries considered this design was simple and still had nuances of Asia.

The appointment of the development was carried out in 1997 by Jakarta Governor, Soerjadi Soedirdja and Secretary of State, Moerdiono after being agreed to by President Soeharto at the President's Executive Office in Jakarta. President Soeharto proposed that the name "Jakarta Tower" be replaced by "Trilogy Tower".

Tower construction began in 1997. As costs mounted, the developer sought funds from foreign investors. The total fund that was needed to around US$560m (around Rp 1.2 trillion).

=== Economic crisis (1997) ===
When an economic crisis hit Asia in 1997, the Indonesian property industry fell and plenty of construction projects were either postponed or cancelled, including the Trilogy Tower. By stopping the development of this tower, the site was abandoned and became a wide puddle.

=== Continuation of the Jakarta Tower project (2003-present) ===
After the Indonesian economy began to rise again, the government of Jakarta continued the development of this tower and returned its name back to Jakarta Tower. The Jakarta Tower then was continued in 2003 went through a new consortium, namely PT Persada Japa Pamudja (PJP) that consisted of national rich businessmen.

The appointment of the development of the tower that was projected to the highest tower in the world was carried out by the Minister of the State Secretariat (the Secretary of State) Bambang Kesowo and Special Capital District of Jakarta Governor Sutiyoso on April 15, 2004.

In October 2010, Wiratman Wangsadinata, Jakarta Tower's consultant and designer, officially announced that Jakarta Tower's construction had to be suspended due to lack of finance.

In July 2015, one of the largest developers in Indonesia began to marketing about 6 condominiums, 1 grade A office tower and 1 prestigious mall in town, and might remark the project as cancelled.

In July 2025, it was confirmed that real estate tycoon Sugianto Kusuma under his company Agung Sedayu Group will take over the Jakarta Tower

== Structure of the tower ==
The Jakarta Tower will be built in an area measuring 306,810 square meters. The building itself would measure 40,550 square meters and 558 meter high, surpassing Q1 (344m) in Australia to become the tallest building in the southern hemisphere. The Jakarta tower will be taller than any currently completed free-standing structure and more than four times taller than the Monas (Jakarta National Monument, 137 m).

Like the initial 1997 design, the new development calls for the tower to have three cylindrical legs, 13.2 m in diameter, that will rise up 500 m. Two of the legs will have three elevators each, travelling 7 m per second. The third leg will contain eight elevators, dedicated for visitors. The tower will include a 40-metre-diameter (130 ft), 15-metre-high (49 ft) concrete ring, and will be embedded with an 80 m diameter foundation driven to 58 m into the ground.

According to the developer, the Jakarta Tower will use more than 20,000 workers for the development and more than 40,000 manpower after the building is in full operation.

=== Facilities ===
The Jakarta Tower plans to supply these facilities: • 144,000 square meter parking lot • 17-floor high podium building • elevator can reach to the tower top • rotating restaurant • mega mall • café • amusement park • Indonesian historical museum • hotel • condominium • multipurpose/conference room that could accommodate 10,000 visitors • 8,000 square meter office space • exhibition center • education and training center • center of multimedia that accompanied the transmitter television and the radio broadcast • business trading center • sport center

A total of 4-6 million estimated visitors each year will come to the Jakarta Tower.

=== Expenses ===
The expense of developing this mega project is estimated to be around Rp 1.4 trillion initially and increased to almost Rp 2.7 trillion after the steel price increase in the world.

According to the director PT Prasada Japa Pamudja, Ferry Sangeroki, parties that involved in this project are "more than 100 companies and individuals ". He said that this project is financed through three routes:

1. capital participation (Rp 400 billion),
2. the loan of syndication (Rp 600-800 billion), and
3. he pre-project sale (around Rp 1.3 trillion).

== Controversies ==
=== Social and economy imbalance ===
In the year 1995–1997, the Trilogy Tower became the criticism material especially being the fund as well as the function of this tower in the middle of the social and economy imbalance that still spread out.

Theo Syafei, the former Territorial Military Commander, said, "Better the fund as big as that was used for the development of the "East Indonesian region." Therefore, this tower began to be known also with the term of "Imbalance Tower"("menara kesenjangan"). The Jakarta Post newspaper calls it as "tower of indifference".

Several People's Representative Council members called it as the "lighthouse" project, a naming towards projects in the period of President Sukarno that it was considered (especially by the supporter of the New Sociopolitical System) as the project to show off to the outside world, without the obvious benefit for the people.

Sudwikatmono as the owner of this project in that period, denied this tower was acknowledged as the lighthouse project. The reason is, unlike Monas which was built by the government, the Trilogy Tower was purely built by private enterprise. Secretary of State Moerdiono respond to concerning the social gap that the irony with this project only explained the technical benefit for the world of architecture, the construction and the world of the broadcasting of radio and television. The plan is, the sprout of the tower will indeed be mounted radio and television antenna.

=== Bethany Church ===
During the period of the current development (2006–2011), one of the controversy that enough to come to the forefront about the Jakarta Tower is that this tower will become Christian Center that is supported by the Church of Bethany Indonesia. Regarding to Abraham Alex Tanusaputra, the President Commissioner of this project developer, PT Prasada Japa Pamudja that is also the General Chairman of Indonesia Bethany Church Congress. Moreover, Bethany's group often acknowledged this project as the Jakarta Prayer Tower or Jakarta Revival Center.
