= Sijeruk =

- Village
- Location in Java and Indonesia Sijeruk (Indonesia)
- Coordinates: 7.317259°S 109.716806°E
- Country: Indonesia
- Region: Java
- Province: Central Java
- Regency: Banjarnegara Regency
- Town: Banjarmangu
- Time zone: UTC+7 (IWST)
- Postcode: 53452
- Area code: (+62) 286

Sijeruk (Indonesian pronunciation: [sid͡ʒəˈrʊk̚]) is a village in Banjarmangu, Banjarnegara Regency, Central Java, Indonesia on the island of Java. On 4 January 2006, the village was buried under tons of mud and rocks from a landslide. Initial reports indicated between 100 and 190 deaths or missing people. Sijeruk is located approximately 210 miles (340 km) east of Jakarta.
