= ITC Roxy Mas =

Mall in Cideng, West Jakarta, Indonesia

Coordinates: 6.166561°S 106.802816°E

- Location: Cideng, Central Jakarta, Indonesia
- Opened: 1993/1995

ITC Roxy Mas, in Cideng, located in Central Jakarta is a mall noted for its mobile phone business.

== See also ==
- List of shopping malls in Indonesia
