= List of Indonesian prisoners and detainees =

This is a list of Indonesian prisoners and detainees:

- Abdul Aziz Imam Samudra
- Bali Nine
- Abu Bakar Bashir
- Andrew Chan
- Si Yi Chen
- Schapelle Corby
- Michael Czugaj
- Riduan Isamuddin
- Renae Lawrence
- Tan Duc Thanh Nguyen
- Matthew Norman
- Amrozi bin Nurhasyim
- Scott Rush
- Martin Stephens
- Tommy Suharto
- Myuran Sukumaran
