= List of Mandailing people =

- Abdul Haris Nasution, National Hero of Indonesia
- Adam Malik, Politician
- Adnan Buyung Nasution, Lawyer
- Agus Salim Rangkuti, Military officer
- Ahmad Tarmimi Siregar, Malaysian actor
- Armijn Pane, Writer
- Assim al-Hakeem, Saudi Arabian Islamic Scholar
- Basyral Hamidy Harahap, Writer
- Bobby Nasution, Politician
- Burhanuddin Harahap, Politician
- Cosmas Batubara, Politician
- Darmin Nasution, Businessman
- Diana Nasution, Singer, actress
- Faisal Basri, Economist
- Hamsad Rangkuti, Writer
- Harun Idris, Malaysian politician
- Hasjrul Harahap, Politician
- Lafran Pane, Educator
- Merari Siregar, Writer
- Mochtar Lubis, Journalist
- Prisia Nasution, Actress
- Sakinah Junid, Malaysia Women activism
- Saifuddin Nasution Ismail, Malaysian politician
- Sanusi Pane, Writer
- Sholeh Mahmoed Nasution, Indonesian Islamic televangelist
- Suhaimi Kamaruddin, Malaysian lawyer
- Sutan Puasa - One of Kuala Lumpur founder
- Soeman Hs, Indonesian writer
- Todung Mulya Lubis, Lawyer
- Willem Iskander, Indonesian writer, educator
- Abdul Latif Ibrahim, Malaysian Scientist
