= Federasi Serikat Petani Indonesia =

The FSPI or Federation of Indonesian Peasant Union or Federasi Serikat Petani Indonesia was declared on 8 July 1998 in Kampong Dolok Maraja, Lobu Ropa Village, Bandar Pulau Sub district, Asahan District, North Sumatra by a number of Indonesian struggling peasants. The birth of FSPI is part of the long history of Indonesian peasants’ struggle to gain the freedom to speak, to assemble, and to be organized in order to struggle for their rights, which had been repressed and absorbed since the start of the new order when Suharto came to power in 1966-67.

Federation of Indonesian Peasant Union (Federasi Serikat Petani Indonesia) is now based in Jakarta, with over 12 unions all across Indonesia.

Federasi Serikat Petani Indonesia (Federasi Serikat Petani Indonesia) is a member of La Via Campesina, The International Peasants Movement.

Address of FSPI : Jl. Mampang Prapatan XIV No. 5 Jakarta Selatan, Indonesia

== Notes and references ==
- Press Release (12 July 1998)
- FSPI Website
