= Lintas (TV program) =

- Genre: News Program
- Created by: Siti Hardiyanti Rukmana
- Developed by: Siti Hardiyanti Rukmana
- Country of origin: Indonesia
- Original language: Indonesian

Production
- Running time: 30 minutes

Original release
- Network: MNCTV
- Release: 1 July 1995 – 31 October 2017

Related
- Selamat Pagi Indonesia; Serbaneka; Jurnal Berita; Lintas iNews; Lintas Pagi, Lintas Siang, Lintas Petang, Lintas Malam

Lintas (Across) is the name used for MNCTV newscast programs since 1995, prior to the adoption of the Lintas iNews name in 2017.

== History ==
Lintas (Across) was created by Siti Hardiyanti Rukmana. In TPI's early days, the network also aired the more humanities-oriented Serbaneka, which aired in the evening and several times experienced changes in airtime. Serbaneka was broadcast as a form of additional TPI broadcast hours until evening, although at that time the TPI night broadcast was still very limited to the viewers, especially outside the reach of the single transmission station area of TPI. Besides Serbaneka, the program Selamat Pagi Indonesia (Good Morning Indonesia) was also aired, which is the TPI morning news program. The network also aired TVRI's news programs Bisnis Hari Ini and Berita Pagi.

After four years of broadcasting Serbaneka, TPI replaced the program by presenting news Lintas Siang and Lintas Sore, starting in July 1995. A year later, the Lintas Siang and Lintas Sore program was merged to form Lintas 5, so called because it aired every day at 17.00 WIB.

Starting in 1997, Lintas 5 began broadcasting news taken from the air by helicopter, to facilitate faster presentation of news to viewers.

On 1 November 2017, coinciding with all MNC-owned newscasts being rebranded to feature the iNews branding, MNCTV's newscasts became Lintas iNews.

== Programs ==
=== Lintas Pagi ===
Lintas Pagi (formerly Selamat Pagi Indonesia) is part of the Lintas news program that airs in the morning. It premiered on 23 January 2006 and replaced the program Selamat Pagi Indonesia, which for 15 years remained at TPI. Lintas Pagi is divided into several segments, and at the end of the week, this program is called Lintas Pagi Akhir Pekan with more portion of feature news.

=== Lintas Siang ===
Lintas Siang is part of a news program from MNCTV which was resuming broadcast since 23 January 2006. Lintas Siang had previously been aired in July 1995, but was stopped broadcasting and merged with Lintas Sore starting in July 1996, until it changed its name to Lintas 5.

=== Lintas Petang ===
Lintas Petang is a series of Lintas programs that were previously called Lintas 5 and Lintas Sore. In 2011, Lintas Petang shifted one hour earlier than the previous broadcast time.

=== Lintas Malam ===
Lintas Malam is a series of programs that airs at midnight. It had premiered on 1 April 2001 (as Jurnal Berita) later 9 April 2001 (as Lintas Malam).
