= Pasumpahan =

Island in West Sumatra, Indonesia

Coordinates: 1°07′06″S 100°22′04″E

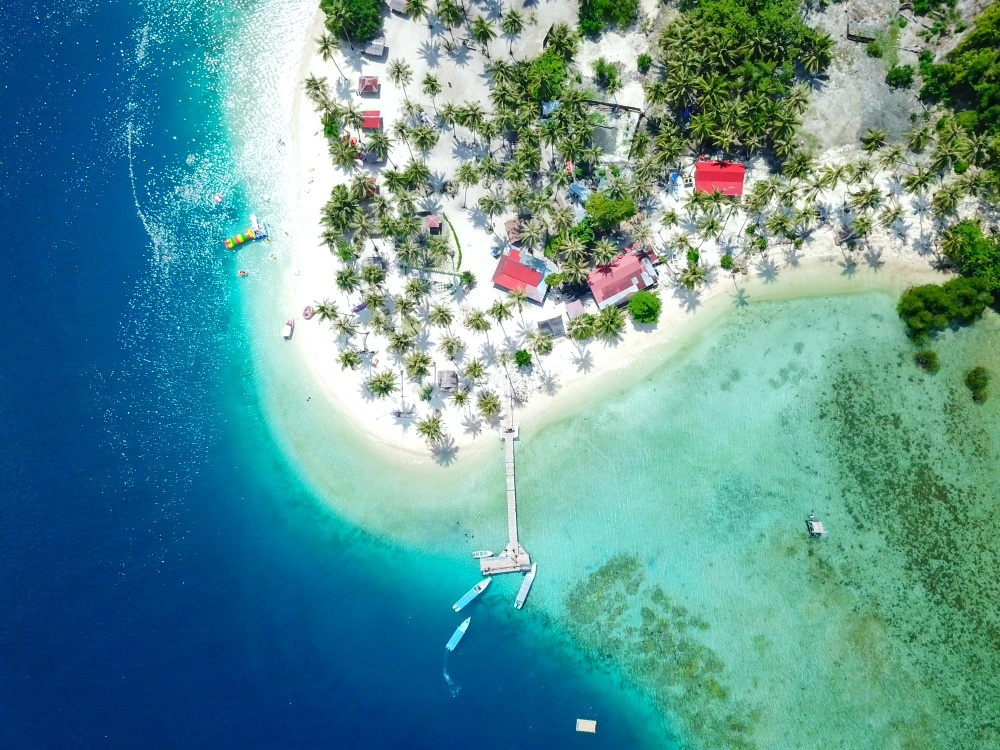
Pasumpahan Island

Pasumpahan is an island in the sub-district of Bungus, West Sumatra Province, Indonesia. The island is uninhabited.

Located 200 meters from Sikuai Island, tourism sites in Pasumpahan include white sand beaches and coral reefs.
