= Timeline of the 2004 Indian Ocean earthquake and tsunami =

Although National Oceanic and Atmospheric Administration (NOAA) scientists at the Pacific Tsunami Warning Center (PTWC) in Hawaii eventually issued warnings of a possible tsunami from the large earthquake off Sumatra, the waves outran notification systems at jet speeds of 500 mph (804 km/h), catching hundreds of thousands of people unaware. The following is a timeline of the 2004 Indian Ocean earthquake. All times are Coordinated Universal Time (UTC), on Sunday, 26 December 2004.

== Sunday, 26 December 2004 ==
=== 00:58:53 UTC ===
Resulting seismic signals received at the NOAA Pacific Tsunami Warning Center (PTWC) from stations in Australia who triggered an alarm that alerted bystanders. At the same time, an Indonesian radio station reports the death of nine villagers as the result of a tsunami.

=== 01:13 UTC ===
The PTWC issued a message to other observatories in the Pacific with its preliminary earthquake parameters.

=== 01:14 UTC ===
The PTWC issued a bulletin providing information on the earthquake and stating there was no tsunami threat to the Pacific nations that participate in the Tsunami Warning System in the Pacific (ITSU). These member nations are part of UNESCO's Intergovernmental Oceanographic Commission (IOC) and the International Coordination Group (ICG) for the ITSU. India, Sri Lanka, and the Maldives are not part of the Pacific system.

=== 02:30 UTC ===
The PTWC attempted to contact the Australia Meteorological Service with no luck but were successful in contacting Australia Emergency Management. They confirmed they were aware of the earthquake.

=== 03:23 UTC ===
A tsunami hits the coastal villages in Sri Lanka.

=== 03:30 UTC ===
Internet newswire reports of casualties in Sri Lanka provided PTWC with the first indications of the existence of a destructive tsunami.

=== 03:45 UTC ===
Armed with the knowledge of a potentially devastating tsunami, PTWC contacted the United States Pacific Command (PACOM) in Hawaii.

=== 03:45 UTC ===
The PTWC received a call from a Sri Lankan Navy Commander inquiring about the potential for further tsunami waves from aftershocks.

=== 04:00 UTC ===
U.S. Ambassador in Sri Lanka called PTWC to set up a notification system to prepare for the possibility of a large aftershock. He said they would contact the Sri Lankan Prime Minister's office for such notifications. Continuing news reports gave increasing and more widespread casualties.

=== 05:25 UTC ===
The first reading from the Australian National Tidal Centre gauge at Cocos Island west of Australia gave a reading of 0.5m crest-to-trough.

=== 05:45 UTC ===
The PTWC contacted the Australian Bureau of Meteorology and advised them about the increased earthquake magnitude and the 0.5m reading at Cocos Island, as well as the possibility of a destructive tsunami impact on Australia's west coasts.

=== 06:00 UTC ===
The PTWC re-contacted PACOM to advise of increased earthquake magnitude and potential for further tsunami impacts in the western Indian Ocean.

=== 06:15 UTC ===
Australia Bureau of Met called PTWC to advise they had issued an alert to their west coast.

=== 06:20 UTC ===
The NOAA's National Weather Service Pacific Region director contacted the PTWC to report PACOM said no tsunami was observed at Diego Garcia in the Indian Ocean.

=== 08:15 UTC ===
The PTWC spoke with U.S. State Department Operations and advised them about the potential threat to Madagascar and Africa. They set up a conference call with the U.S. embassies at Madagascar and Mauritius, and PTWC advised them of the situation.

=== 15:36 UTC ===
The PTWC issued a third Tsunami Information Bulletin for this event, informing the Pacific that small sea level fluctuations from the Indian Ocean tsunami were being observed in the Pacific, it is assumed caused by energy that was wrapped around the south of Australia.
