= Otto Sidharta =

Indonesian Composer (born 1955)

Otto Sidharta (Born Bandung November 6, 1955) is an Indonesian Composer. He is known for his electronic music.

Otto Sidharta finished his post-graduate study in composition and electronic music composition at Sweelinck Conservatorium in Amsterdam under the guidance of Professor Ton de Leeuw, and later on he gained his doctoral degree at Institute Seni Indonesia Surakarta.

Sidharta's interest in using environmental sounds to express his musical ideas developed when he was a student at the Jakarta Institute of Arts (Institut Kesenian Jakarta). He performed his first electronic music piece, Kemelut, based on water sounds in the First Indonesian Young Composer Festival (Pekan Komponis Muda) in 1979. In 1979 he collected some nature and animal sounds on Nias, in the Borneo (Kalimantan) jungle, Riau islands, and some other remote places such as Banten, Kajang and Papua. These sounds were used as material for some of his works such as Ngendau, Hutan Plastik and East wind, Nature, Saluang, Kajang. And some others.

Beside being a composer, Sidharta used to be a chairman of both the Music Committee of Jakarta Art Council (Komite Musik Dewan Kesenian Jakarta) and Indonesian Composers Association (Asosiasi Komponis Indonesia). He teaches at Jakarta Institute of Arts (Institut Kesenian Jakarta), Sekolah Pascasarjana IKJ ( IKJ Graduate School) and in Cantus (Music Education and Information Center, Jakarta). Furthermore, he used to be the Music Director for the Nusantara Symphony Orchestra (Orkes Symphony Nusantara) for several years.

For Supplement/Upstream, Sidharta created Wind of trade, a soundscape based on the sounds and voices associated with old Dutch and Indonesian culture, such as sounds from nature, markets, street vendors, trains, ships and children playing.

== Works ==
- Kemelut – live electronic music (1979)
- Meta Ekologi – mix live and pre-recorded electronic music (1980)
- Ngendau – soundscape (1982)
- Hutan Plastik – soundscape (1982)
- East Wind – mix soundscape & live performer (1983)
- Untitled – a piece for clarinet, cello, percussion and tape (1985)
- Gong – electronic music (1985)
- Gaung – electronic music (1986)
- Stringquartet – string quartet (1986)
- Saluang – electronic music (1986)
- Quintet for oboe, clarinet, violin, viola and cello (1986)
- Trio for clarinet, cello and piano (1987)
- Waves – computer-controlled electronic music (1988)
- Marimba – for marimba solo (1988)
- Pulses – computer music (1988)1
- Technophobia – live computer music with voice and dance (1990)
- 3 in 1 – music for percussion, clarinet and computer (1991)
- Rim's – computer music (1991)
- RamayanaKu – for voice and computer (1992)
- Matra – for percussion and computer (1992)
- Topeng Monyet – computer music (1993)
- Mitsuno Hibiki – for violin and computer (1993)
- Goro-goro – for eight percussion players (1994)
- Soundscape I – soundscape (1995)
- Music for Clarinet and Computer (1995)
- Music for Flute and Computer (1996)
- Music for Biwa and Computer (1996)
- Music for Piano and Computer (1997)

and a few untitled short works for non musical instruments and computer, gamelan instruments and computer (1998–2001).
