= Cape South =

Point in South Kalimantan, Indonesia

Cape South Indonesian: Tanjung Selatan
- Cape
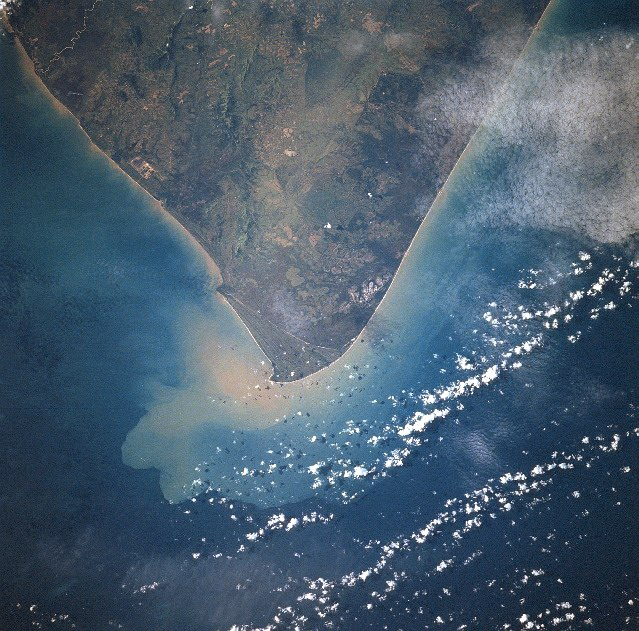
- Cape South seen from the STS-78 in 1996

- Interactive map outlining Southern Cape
- Coordinates: 4°10′S 114°37′E
- Location: South Kalimantan, Indonesia
- Offshore water bodies: Java Sea

Cape South (Indonesian: Tanjung Selatan) is a coastal headland located on the southern tip of Kalimantan. It marks part of the southern coastline of South Kalimantan, Indonesia.

== Geography ==
Tanjung Selatan is a cape south of Tanjung Burung on the southern shore of Borneo. The shore between Tanjung Burung and Tanjung Selatan extends for about 37.5 miles (60.4 km) and is set thick with tall trees. This part of the shore is crossed by several small and shallow rivers. Nearby off the northwest shore from Tanjung Selatan is Pulau Datu some 7 miles north. Pulau Datu is a stony wooded islet rising some 30.5 metres (100 ft) above tree top level with a tomb on top. Shoal grounds, as shown by the 5.5 metre contour depth, lie offshore between 3.5 and 8 miles from land and are hazards to navigation. Pinting Belajang, a drying rock, islocated outside this patch of shallow water some 13.25 miles north of Tanjung Selatan. Apart from that, there is also a patch of depth 8.7 metre and about 7.5 miles northwest of Pinting Belajang.

Reef fringing in the Tanjung Selutan area is not well developed due to the region's extensive coastal mud flats, which extend as much as 10 kilometres (6.2 mi) seaward and make the conditions unsuitable for coral growth. Still, reef development occurs offshore of Tanjung Selutan, one of the few coastal points in Central and South Kalimantan where such ecosystems are located. Reef growth conditions improve considerably east of Tanjung Selatan, where more oceanic waters from the Makassar Strait and East Java Sea support better developed fringing reef systems.
