= KBR (news agency) =

Indonesian radio news agency

- Country: Indonesia
- First air date: 29 April 1999
- Availability: Indonesia, Asia, Australia
- Headquarters: Jakarta
- Broadcast area: Nasional
- Owner: PT Media Lintas Inti Nusantara
- Key people: Goenawan Mohamad as President Commissioner, Tosca Santoso as President Director
- Established: 1998
- Official website: www.kbr.id

KBR is the first independent national radio news agency of Indonesia. It is a unique initiative aimed at assisting Indonesia's transition to democracy by facilitating open and informed discussion among millions of people throughout the archipelago. By simply by tuning into their favourite local radio station, millions of Indonesians from across the political, economic and social spectrum can engage in radio debates and, in doing so, influence key issues affecting their lives.

KBR was established as KBR68H (Kantor Berita Radio 68H, Radio News Agency 68H) in April 1999, soon after the end of three decades of authoritarian rule which also signalled an end to restrictions on the production of radio news. Its first headquarters were in Utan Kayu Street No. 68H, East Jakarta — hence its name.

It quickly developed as a relatively low cost and effective tool for citizen participation in public life. Today, KBR produces 8 hours a day of information and education based programming to 900 radio stations in Indonesia and nine countries across Asia. With 22 million regular listeners in Indonesia alone, it is by far the biggest radio network in the country.

With its explicitly public service ethos, and its strong emphasis on government accountability, KBR has created a new paradigm for information dissemination and democratic development in Indonesia.

On May 3, 2014, KBR68H was renamed as simply KBR, removing 68H letter.

== Programs ==
The radio news agency actively encourages listener participation in a country where, for decades, they were discouraged from engagement in public life. News reports or talk show debates on KBR68H have resulted in numerous instances where local or national government action has been prompted and, by being able to demonstrate concrete examples of success, KBR68H encourages listeners all over the country to demand more from their leaders and to take action when they are found wanting.

The popularity of their phone-in programs – with dozens and sometimes hundreds of text messages and phone calls being received from all over the country during a single program – attests to the great enthusiasm with which listeners respond to this opportunity to have their say.

Programs broadcast nationwide include weekly interactive talk shows on legal reform and human rights, health, religious tolerance, environment and economics, and others address topics such as religion and tolerance and education. A toll free phone number and text messaging facility encourages participation in all of these programs by listeners regardless of their economic, social or political status and a platform from which to state their views. KBR68H also produces programs to meet the special information needs. This includes a daily news program, Kabar Aceh (Aceh News), broadcast by local radio stations across Aceh, and Kabar Tanah Papua (Papua news), which provides listeners in Papua and Papua with news about the two provinces.

KBR68H is a pioneer in the production of in-depth and investigative radio programs, a genre otherwise largely undeveloped in Indonesia. Its Indonesian language SAGA radio program regularly takes listeners on an audio journey around the country as it addresses a wide range of topics largely untouched by other Indonesian media. SAGA reports have won numerous Indonesian awards for the high quality of their journalism.

Since 2003, KBR68H has produced a weekly hour-long regional current affairs program, Asia Calling, the only one of its kind on Indonesian radio. Asia Calling covers a wide range of stories that highlight the political, economic, social and cultural diversity of the region. With thirty correspondents scattered across Asia, Asia Calling goes behind the headlines to show how major developments are affecting people's lives, providing nuanced and carefully balanced insights into stories that are often largely missed by other media.

Produced in English, as of June 2013, Asia Calling is translated into 10 Asian languages and broadcast by 321 radio stations throughout the region. Asia Calling features have won a number of domestic awards and in 2009, Asia Calling correspondent Elise Potaka was co-winner of the Asia Pacific Environmental Journalism Award for her series called, "The Murky World of Coal Mining in China".

As part of its public service mission, KBR68H rebuilt dozens of radio stations destroyed in Aceh in the December 2004 tsunami, as well as stations affected by the 2006 Yogyakarta earthquake and the 2009 earthquake in West Sumatera.

KBR68H has also pioneered a radio station building program in remote areas of Eastern Indonesia, the least developed part of the country, in cooperation with an Indonesian non-profit organization, PPMN, in order to prevent people living in these locations from being cut off from the development process and instead to enable them to play an active part in it. Most recently, stations have been established in the Yahukimo and Paniai regencies in the Central Highlands of Papua, and in Central Sumba on the island of Sumba, and May saw the launch of the latest station to be built, in Sarmi, Papua.

For a modest cost these stations have a transformative effect on local communities, enabling them to have their voices heard, often for the first time, on political, social and economic issues, as well as providing a unique vehicle for cultural expression. They also enable the effective engagement of these communities with local government and, in so doing, increase government accountability and transparency in parts of the country that have historically lacked this.

== Environmental Issues ==
In February 2008, KBR68H established Jakarta's first radio station to focus on environmental issues, Green Radio. This station, with a tag line of the eco lifestyle of Jakarta, is also the only radio station in Jakarta to be fully powered by solar energy. Ten hours per day the station broadcasts discussions about green issues, town planning, eco-friendly transport, waste recycling, green energy options, and various other aspects of environmentally friendly lifestyles.

Green Radio was set up in response to the increasingly bad environmental conditions in Jakarta, such as increasingly severe annual flooding, and pollution, though it also addresses environmental problems around the country, including the major challenge posed by the continued logging of Indonesia's forests.

Green Radio conducts a number of off-air activities to encourage its listeners to take action to improve their environment. This includes a reforestation program in the Gunung Gede Pangrango National Park through an ambitious tree adoption program that entails replanting trees while working with the local farming community to establish alternative livelihoods that eliminate the need to encroach on national park land.

A number of prominent Indonesians have adopted trees in support of this initiative, including Olga Lidya, Teten Masduki, Ayu Utami, Jimmly Asshiddiqie, and Nia Dinata. In January 2013, the President Susilo Bambang Yudhoyono and Forestry Minister Zulkifli Hasan also visited the site and participated in Green Radio's tree adoption program.

In 2013, KBR68H launched an online news portal, PortalKBR to further extend the reach of the news agency. It also has a page on Facebook and a Twitter account which feature some of the portal and radio news agency's output. In 2015 Green Radio sign off from Sahabat Green Jakarta. And began broadcasting again with call sign of Power FM and closed in 2020

== Award winning media ==
KBR68H has won numerous national and international awards since its establishment. This includes prizes for journalism as well as for the organization as a whole.

Among them are the King Baudouin Foundation International Development Prize, 2008–2009, awarded to KBR68H "...for its contribution to a sustainable development based on the strengthening of democracy, tolerance and citizen participation, by producing and disseminating qualitative information through a network of local radio stations and by promoting professional ethics in the media world...".

In 2010 KBR68H’s founder, Tosca Santoso, was joint winner of the Knight International Journalism Award, and in the same year also won the University of Queensland in Australia's Communication for Social Change Award, and was named as Indonesia's Social Entrepreneur of the Year by the Schwab Foundation for Social Entrepreneurship and Ernst & Young. Tosca Santoso is also an Ashoka Fellow.
