= Union of Catholic University Students of the Republic of Indonesia =

- Perhimpunan Mahasiswa Katolik Republik Indonesia
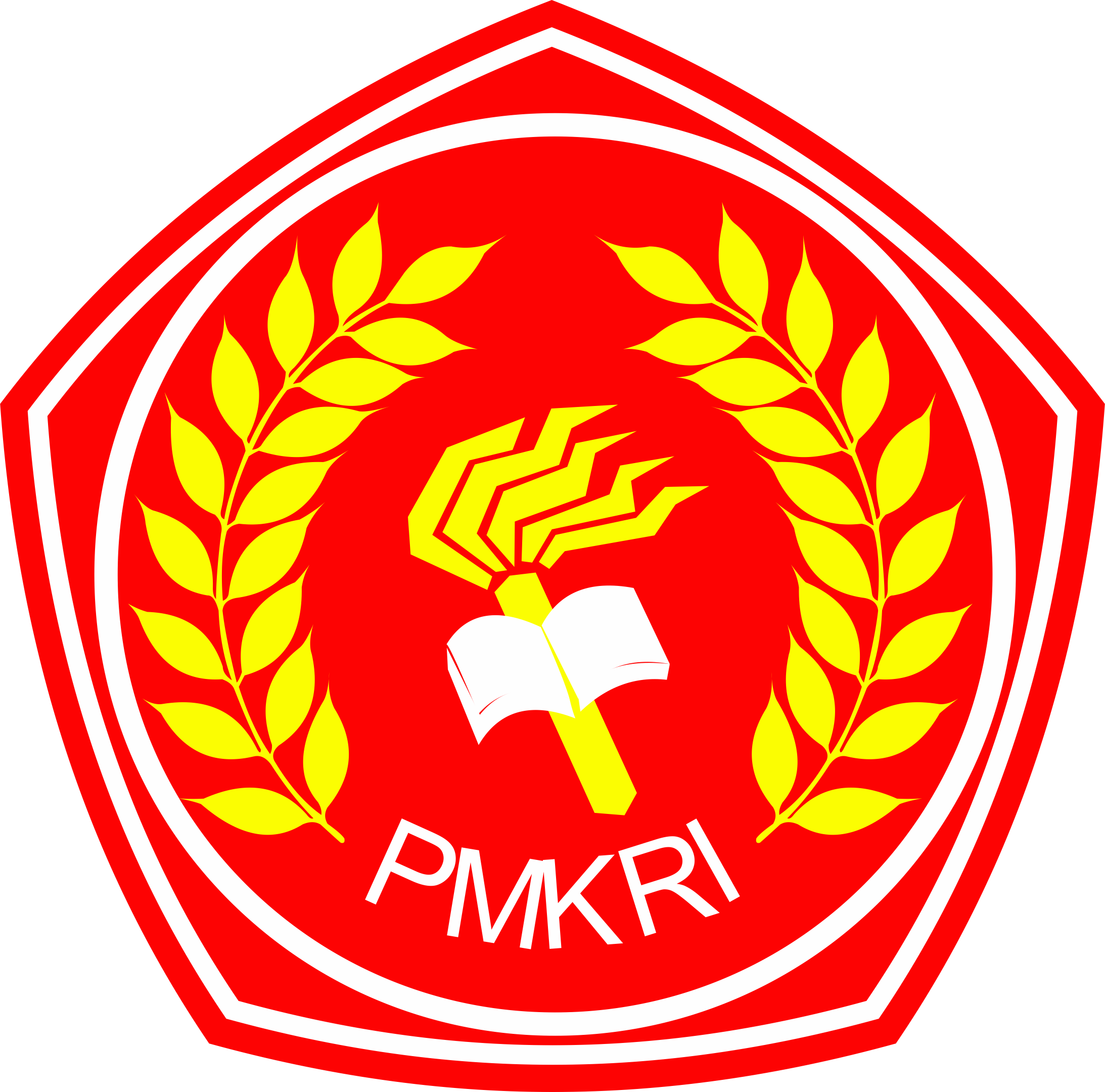
- Logo PMKRI secara Nasional
- Abbreviation: PMKRI
- Predecessor: KSV Federation and PMKRI Yogyakarta
- Formation: May 25, 1947; 79 years ago
- Founders: St. Munadjat Danusaputra, P.K. Haryasudirja, Sutioso, Sudarsono, KS Gani, Supadmirin, PK Ojong, Fr. A. Djajasaputra, SJ, Fr. Prof. Dr. H. Rudding, SJ, and Mgr. Alb. Soegijapranata, SJ.
- Founded at: Widya Mandala Bd., St. Anthony Kotabaru Church, Yogyakarta, Yogyakarta
- Type: Student society
- Purpose: Realisation of social justice, humanity and true brotherhood.
- Headquarters: Margasiswa I Gondangdia, Menteng, Jakarta
- Official language: Indonesia
- Website: pmkri.id, pustaka.pmkri.id, verbivora.com

The Union of Catholic University Students of the Republic of Indonesia (Indonesian: Perhimpunan Mahasiswa Katolik Republik Indonesia, PMKRI), is a nationwide social organisation in Indonesia. PMKRI was founded in Yogyakarta on 25 May 1947; 79 years ago.
