= Radio Elshinta =

All-news radio station in Jakarta, Indonesia

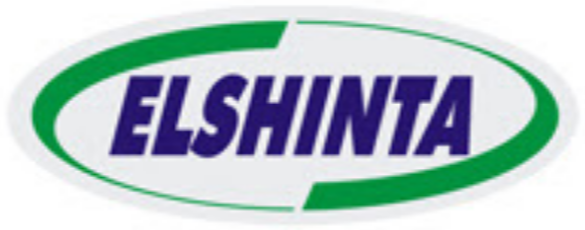
- Type: News and talk radio network
- Branding: Elshinta News and Information
- Country: Indonesia
- First air date: 14 February 1968 (format switch: 14 February 2000)
- Availability: National
- Radio stations: see below
- Owner: Elshinta Media Group
- Parent: Salim Group
- Official website: elshinta.com

PM2FGZ
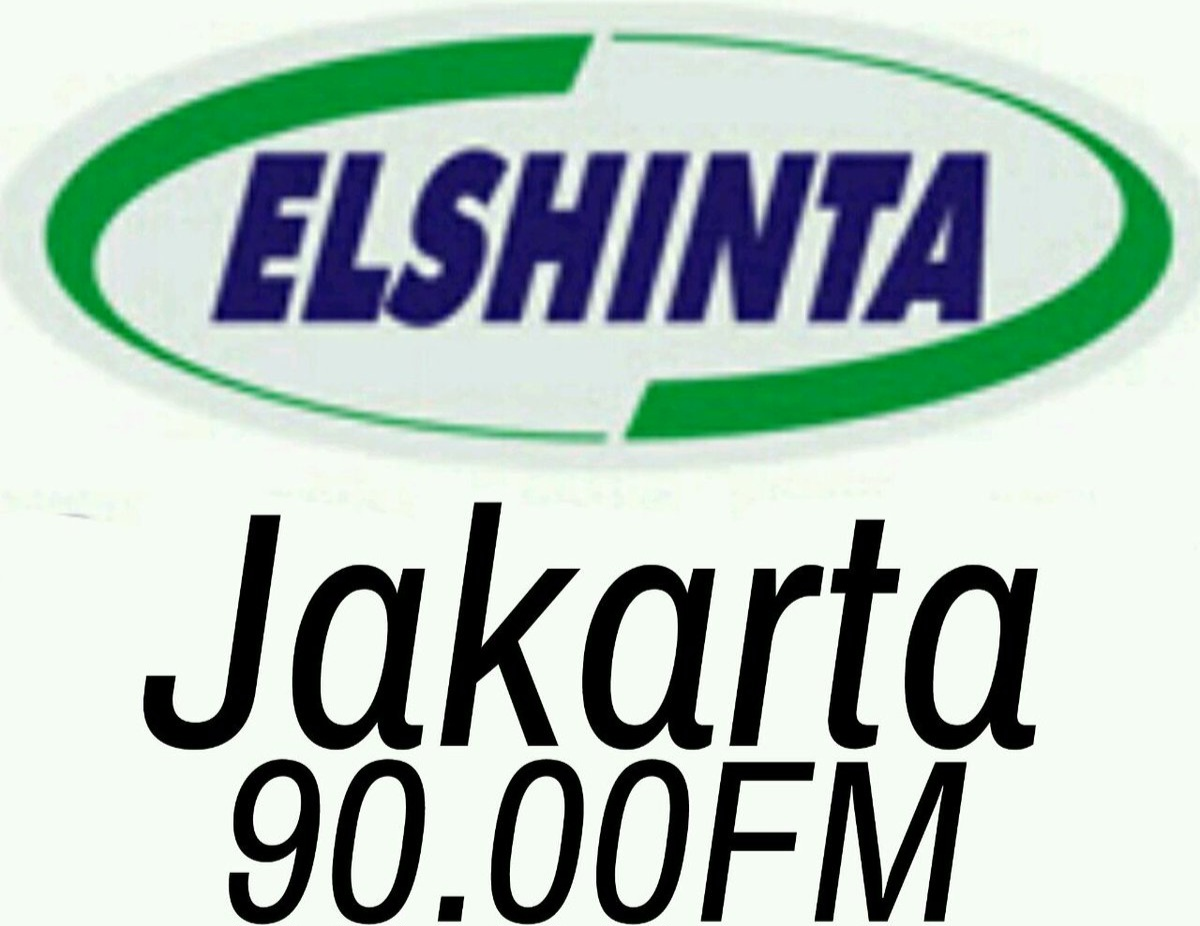
- Central Jakarta, Jakarta; Indonesia
- Broadcast area: Jabodetabek (Greater Jakarta), Karawang, Serang, parts of Lebak, Purwakarta, and West Bandung Regency
- Frequency: 90.05 MHz
- Branding: Elshinta Jakarta 90.05 FM

Ownership
- Owner: Elshinta Media

History
- First air date: 14 February 1968
- Former frequencies: 1368 AM
- Call sign meaning: None; sequentially assigned

PM2FGZ (90.00 FM, often abbreviated 90 FM), also known as Elshinta News and Talk or Elshinta, is a news and talk radio station in Jakarta, Indonesia.

== History ==
The station was started in 1968 by Suyoso Karsono, also known as Mas Yos, a retired Air Commodore of the Indonesian Air Force. He began his career in entertainment by starting Irama Records, a recording studio specializing in Long Play (LP) records. It closed in 1967, and Karsono turned to radio. Elshinta started as an amateur radio station on an AM channel and was named after his youngest daughter, Elshinta Suyoso. At that time, Elshinta played all kinds of music from Jazz, Classical, Pop, Rock, and Reggae to Hawaiian music. The station's name influenced Suyoso's other group names for off-air programmes, such as the Elshinta Band, played by his sons, the Elshinta's Friendships Association (EFA), which produced merchandise and the Elshinta Newsletter, the popular Elshinta Football team, composed of friends and fans, and the Elshinta Hawaiian Seniors band (later shortened to The Hawaiian Seniors).

Radio Elshinta was later acquired by the Salim Group. Under their management, Elshinta moved to FM as a music entertainment station with a few news programs, including BBC World Service and Voice Of America. They steadily added more news segments, and Elshinta completely abandoned its music programming on 14 February 2000. Today, Elshinta only broadcasts news and talk programming, in addition to sponsored content and affiliations like NHK World Service.

== Programming ==
- News and Talk Edisi Pagi (morning show, 5-10am)
- News and Talk Edisi Siang (high noon show, 10am-4pm)
- News and Talk Edisi Sore (afternoon to evening show, 4pm-9pm)
- News and Talk Edisi Malam (night show 9pm-12am)
- News and Talk Edisi Dinihari (early morning show, 12-5am)
- Interactive Discussion (11pm-1am, together with News and Talk Malam)
- Komisi Anda (late night discussion show, 1-5am together with News and Talk Dinihari)
- NHK World Service (9:05pm–9:30pm)
- China Radio International (5am and 8:30pm)
- Power Breakfast (every Monday, 7-8am)

== Network ==
Elshinta has 8 regional stations that are self-owned. Elshinta's regional stations relay Jakarta's broadcasts, but sometimes local news sessions are broadcast by certain stations. Elshinta also has 32 affiliations across the Indonesian archipelago.

=== Owned stations ===
- 91.0 Elshinta Semarang (PM4FAH)
- 97.6 Elshinta Surabaya (PM6FKO)
- 99.9 Elshinta Tegal (PM4FBF)
- 93.2 Elshinta Medan (PM3FAP)
- 105.1 Elshinta Lampung (PM8FFK, ex-88.5 FM and ex-99.6, licensed in the Tanggamus Regency)
- 103.7 Elshinta Sekayu (South Sumatra) (PM7FDR)
- 96.7 Elshinta Palembang (PM7FDK)
- 94.2 Radio Aceh FM Banda Aceh

== Media Group ==
Elshinta has its own media group, consisting of: Elshinta Magazine, Elshinta.com, Jakarta local TV station Elshinta TV, and Fit Radio.

== Influence ==
Elshinta broadcast updates and commentaries during the 2016 Jakarta Attacks and 2018 Surabaya Attack. Elshinta was warned by the Broadcasting Commission (KPI), however, for spreading news about a fake explosion during the 2016 Jakarta Attacks. Elshinta claimed that they never spread such news.
