= RRI Programa 3 =

- Logo prominently used since July 2024
- Central Jakarta, Jakarta; Indonesia
- Broadcast area: National
- Frequency: 88.8 FM (Jakarta)
- Branding: Pro 3 RRI, Pro 3

Programming
- Language: Indonesian
- Format: All-news radio, talk radio, sports radio, Indonesian pop

Ownership
- Owner: Radio Republik Indonesia
- Sister stations: RRI Programa 1 RRI Programa 2 RRI Programa 4 RRI Programa 5 Voice of Indonesia

History
- Former names: RRI Programa III

Technical information
- Translator: Various

Links
- Webcast: Official RRI website RRI Digital
- Website: www.rri.co.id
- Satellite: Telkom-4: 3954 H (free-to-air); MNC Vision: 510

Programa 3 Radio Republik Indonesia ('Programme 3 of the Radio Republik Indonesia'), known as RRI Programa 3, Pro 3 RRI, RRI Pro 3, or simply Pro 3, is an Indonesian national radio station owned by the country's public radio broadcaster Radio Republik Indonesia (RRI). It broadcasts news and talk programming, but occasionally Indonesian pop songs and sports matches are aired. The station's slogans are Jaringan Berita Nasional (National News Network) and Terus Mengudara untuk Indonesia (Continuously Airing for Indonesia).

== History ==
RRI Programa 3 logo, 2006–2023

The station's logo as appeared on RRI website and RRI NET television channel since 2023, used prominently from 2023 to 2024

Predecessors of the RRI national radio broadcasts, until the late 1990s, are Programa Nasional I and Programa Nasional II; Programa Nasional means "National Programme". Both stations aired "special informational, educational, and entertainment programming".

The launch of Pro 3 was helded on 13th August 2001 in Shangrilla Hotel, Jakarta. On that time, Pro 3 uses the now-defunct WorldSpace technology.

The LPP RRI News Center (Pusat Pemberitaan LPP RRI), a unit in RRI that operates RRI Programa 3, was established on 31 December 2006. At that time, the RRI President Director, Parni Hadi and one of the directors of RRI, Rosarita Niken Widiastuti expected the network to have a separate unit from the more locally oriented RRI Jakarta.

RRI Programa 3 was relaunched as "National News Network" on September 11, 2016, coinciding with RRI's 71st anniversary, even though previously it had been positioned as a news radio station.

== See also ==
- TVRI (TV channel), Indonesian main public television station operated by TVRI
