= Soimah Pancawati =

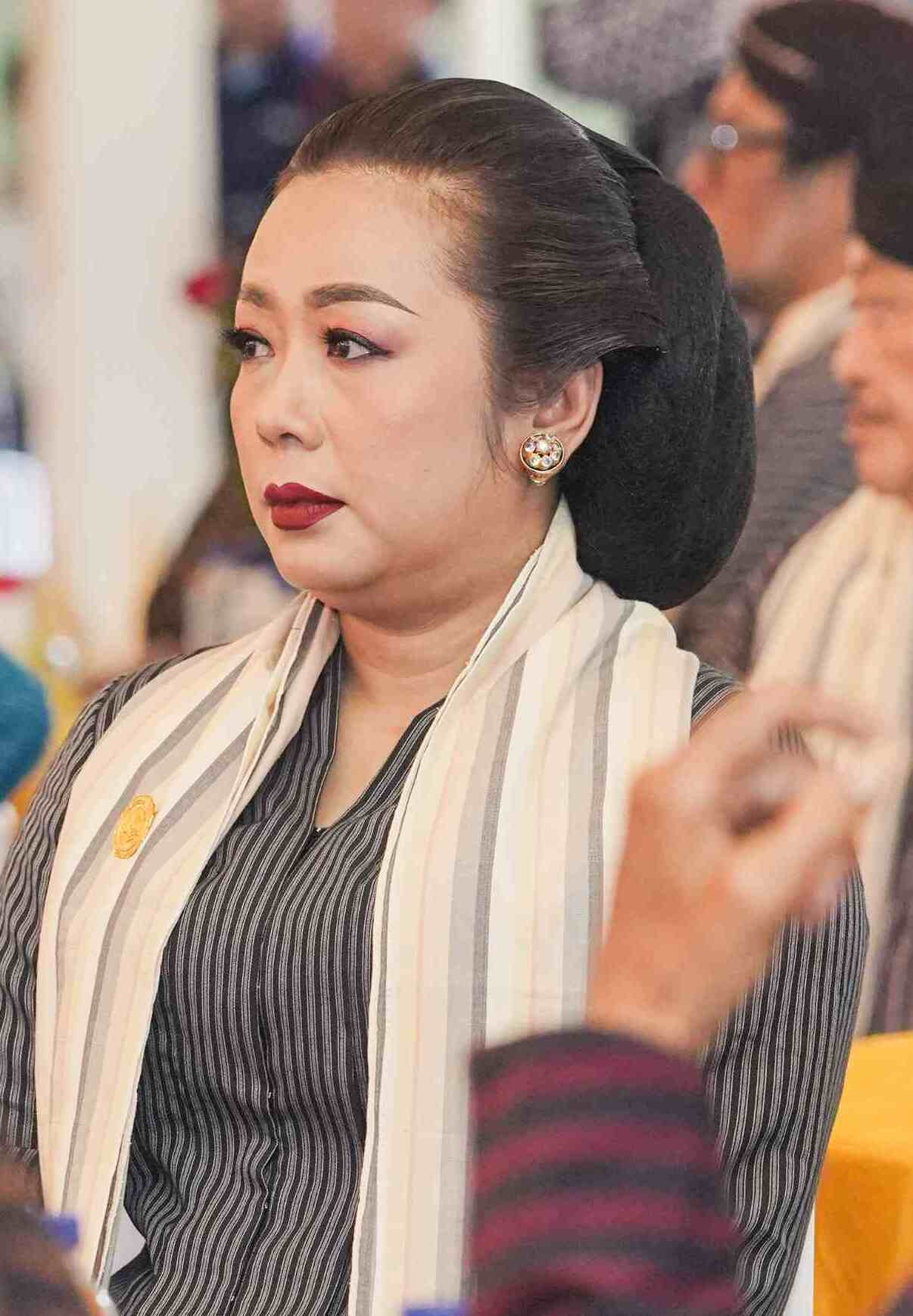
- Soimah for Anugerah Kebudayaan DIY, November 2024.
- Born: 29 September 1980 (age 45); Pati, Central Java, Indonesia
- Other name: Mak'e Soimah
- Occupations: Comedian; Presenter; Singer; Pasindhèn; Celebrity
- Years active: 2009–present
- Spouse: Herwan Prandoko (m. 2002)
- Musical career
- Genres: Hip Hop; Campursari; Keroncong; Rock; Pop; Dangdut
- Instrument: Vocal
- Label: Pelangi Records

Soimah Pancawati (born 29 September 1980) is an Indonesian comedian, singer, pesindhèn, and presenter from Yogyakarta, Indonesia. She sings in several genres, including campursari, pesindhèn, ketoprak, Java pop, hip-hop, and dagelan. She grew up in a coast village at Tayu, Pati, Central Java.

== Career ==
After graduation from junior high school, Soimah decided to continue her education at SMKI (Indonesian Musical High School). She won several singing competitions, including Bintang Karaoke Dangdut in Central Java-Yogyakarta, Bintang Televisi, and Dara Ayu.

She joined the group Jogja Hip Hop Foundation as a pesindhèn singer, and has appeared as a singer on the ANTV television show Seger. On 9 January 2012, she joined the talk show @Show_Imah. She has also appeared on Indonesia Mencari Bakat, Comedy Project, D'academy Asia 2 and Opera Van Java.

== Personal life ==
Soimah Pancawati was born on 29 September 1980, in Pati, Central Java. She is the fifth of seven children of Hadinarko and Kasmiyati. She married Herwan Prandoko (also known as Koko) on 27 December 2002, and they have two sons.

== Discography ==
=== Single ===
Year	Title	Album	Label
2014	"Pelet Cinta"	Non-album single	Pelangi Records
2015	"Woyo-Woyo"	Non-album single	Pelangi Records
2016	"Lukisan Kisah"	Non-album single	Pelangi Records
2017	"Hooka Hooke"	Non-album single	Mugi Turah Entertainment & X-Code Films

== Filmography ==
=== Television ===
Year	Title	Role	Notes	Network
2011–2012	Comedy Project	Herself	Comedy show	Trans TV
2012–2014	@Show_Imah	Herself	Comedy talkshow	Trans TV
2012–2014	Indonesia Mencari Bakat	Herself	Judge	Trans TV
2012	Sedap Malam	Herself	Comedy talkshow	ANTV
2013	Opera Van Java	Herself	Guest star	Trans 7
2013	Yuk Kita Sahur	Herself	Ramadhan comedy variety show	Trans TV
2013–2014	Yuk Keep Smile	Herself	Comedy variety show	Trans TV
2014	Sahurnya Ramadhan	Ma'e	Ramadhan comedy variety show	Trans TV
2014	Ngabuburit	Herself	Comedy variety show	Trans TV
2014	Lenong Rempong	Herself	Comedy variety show	Trans 7
2015–present	So Semprul	Herself	Comedy variety show	SCTV
2015	D'Terong Show	Herself	Dangdut variety show	Indosiar
2015	D Academy 2	Herself	Commentator	Indosiar
2015	D Academy Asia	Herself	Commentator	Indosiar
2016	D Academy 3	Herself	Commentator	Indosiar
2016	D Academy Celebrity	Herself	Judge	Indosiar
2016	Dance Icon Indonesia 2	Herself	Judge	SCTV

== Awards and nominations ==
Year	Awards	Category	Recipients	Result
2011	Insert Awards	The Rising Star	Soimah	Nominated
2013	Panasonic Gobel Awards	Favorite Entertainment Talkshow Presenter	@Show_Imah	Nominated
2014	YKS Romantic Award	Most Romantic Couple	Soimah & Koko	Nominated
2014	Panasonic Gobel Awards	Favorite Entertainment Program Presenter	@Show_Imah	Nominated
2015	Anugerah Musik Indonesia	Best Contemporary Dangdut Female Solo Artist	"Pelet Cinta"	Nominated
