= Denny Cagur =

Indonesian actor, comedian and presenter (born 1977)

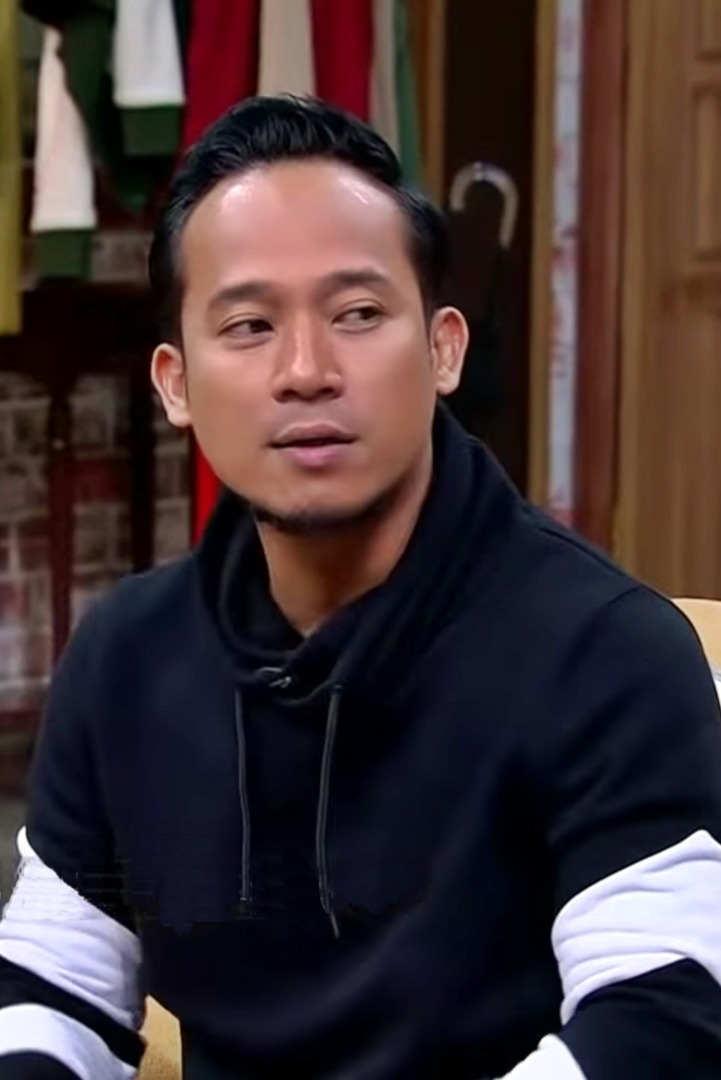
- Denny Cagur in 2017

Member of House of Representatives
- Assuming office 1 October 2024
- Succeeding: Multi-member district
- Constituency: West Java II
- Majority: 58,043 (2024)

Personal details
- Born: Denny Wahyudi; August 29, 1977 (age 49) Bandung, West Java, Indonesia
- Party: PDI-P (since 2023)
- Other political affiliations: PAN (2021-2023)
- Spouse: Santi Widihastuti (m. 2006)
- Education: State University of Jakarta
- Occupation: Politician; Celebrity; Comedian; Presenter

Denny Wahyudi (born 29 August 1977), commonly known as Denny Cagur, is an Indonesian politician, actor, comedian and presenter. He first came into the public eye in 1997 as a member of the comedy group The Cagur Band, with Wendy Armoko and Narji.

== Career ==
Denny Wahyudi began his debut career in 1997 as a comedian in the group The Cagur Band, with Wendy Cagur and Narji Cagur. He appeared in the film Pijat Atas Tekan Bawah with Kiki Fatmala and Saipul Jamil in 2009. He has worked on many television shows, including Chatting, Cagur Naik Bajaj, Follow Cagur, Campur-Campur, Saatnya Kita Sahur, Waktunya Kita Sahur, Comedy Project, Raden Ayu, and Lawan Tawa. He has appeared on the music show Dahsyat (2010–present) and comedy show Yuk Keep Smile (2013 - 2014) and hosts the dance show Bang Jali Dance.

Denny Wahyudi was nominated at the 2014 Dahsyatnya Awards in the category "Outstanding Dangdut Singer". Denny Wahyudi had awarded for "Favourite Comedian" at the Panasonic Gobel Awards in twice times (2014 and 2016) and the 2014 Nickelodeon Indonesia Kids' Choice Awards, "Most Exciting Comedian" at the Global Seru Awards, and "Most Romantic Couple" at the 2014 YKS Romantic Awards.

He ran as a candidate for the Indonesian House of Representatives in the 2024 Indonesian legislative election, and was elected with 58,043 votes to represent West Java's 2nd electoral district (Bandung Regency and West Bandung Regency), as part of the Indonesian Democratic Party of Struggle. Denny Wahyudi stated that he would collaborate with fellow comedian-turned-politician Komeng in order to promote a National Comedy Day.

== Personal life ==
Denny Wahyudi was born on 29 August 1977, in Bandung, West Java. He is an alumnus of Jakarta State University and is the first son of Rojali and Eny. He married Santi Widihastuti on 15 January 2006, and they have one son.

== Filmography ==
=== Film ===
Year	Title	Role	Notes
2009	Pijat Atas Tekan Bawah	Security	Supporting role

=== Television ===
Year	Title	Role	Notes	Network
1999	Chatting	Himself	Comedy show	TPI
2006	Kuraih Dunia Impian			TPI
2006	OB (Office Boy)	Denny	Supporting role	RCTI
2008	Cagur Naik Bajaj	Himself	Sitcom	ANTV
2008	Mamamia Show Season 2	Himself	Presenter	Indosiar
2010	Mamamia Show Season 3	Himself	Presenter	Indosiar
2011–present	Dahsyat	Host	Music Show	RCTI
2011	Sketsa Tawa	Himself	Comedy show	Global TV
2011	Saatnya Kita Sahur	Himself	Ramadhan comedy variety show	Trans TV
2011 - 2013	Pesbukers	Himself	Comedy variety show	ANTV
2011 - 2012	Comedy Project	Himself	Comedy show	Trans TV
2012	Waktunya Kita Sahur	Himself	Ramadhan comedy variety show	Trans TV
2013	Follow Cagur	Himself	Comedy talkshow	ANTV
2013	Campur-Campur	Himself	Comedy talkshow	ANTV
2013	Yuk Kita Sahur	Himself	Ramadhan comedy variety show	Trans TV
2013 - 2014	Yuk Keep Smile	Himself	Comedy variety show	Trans TV
2013 - 2014	Raden Ayu	Himself	Comedy show	Global TV
2013 - 2014	Lawan Tawa	Himself	Comedy variety show	Global TV
2014	Slide Show	Himself	Variety show	Trans TV
2014	Sahurnya Ramadhan	The headman	Ramadhan comedy variety show	Trans TV
2014	Ngabuburit	Himself	Comedy variety show	Trans TV
2014	Happy Happy	Himself	Comedy variety show	Trans TV
2014	Hati ke Hati Show	Himself	Games show	Trans TV
2014–2015	The Blusukan	Himself	Comedy reality show	Trans TV
2015	Perang Macan	Himself	Games show	Trans TV
2015	Duel Maut	Himself	Dangdut show	Trans TV
2015	Mude in Indonesia	Himself	Guest star	RCTI
2015–present	Baper	Himself	Host	RCTI

=== Film Television ===
Year	Title	Role	Notes
2012	Olga Ingin Insyaf	Ustad Denny	Supporting role
2014	Bang Jali Bikin Happy	Bang Jali	Lead role

== Discography ==
=== Single ===
Year	Title	Album	Label
2011	"Sukirman" (with Wendy Cagur and Narji)	Non-album single	Unknown Label
2013	"Goyang Bang Jali"	Non-album single	GlossyIndonesia
2014	"Kecewa vs. Ketawa"	Non-album single	Unknown Label

== TV commercials ==
Year	Title	Role
2005 - 2006	Sejati 12	Himself
2013	Suzuki Karimun Wagon R	Himself
2014	Hemaviton Jreng	Himself
2015	Sosis Champ	Himself

== Awards and nominations ==
Year	Award	Category	Recipients	Results
2014	Dahsyatnya Awards	Outstanding Dangdut Singer	Denny Cagur	Nominated
2014	Dahsyatnya Awards	Outstanding Moment	Phenomenal Bang Jali Dance	Nominated
2014	Dahsyatnya Awards	Outstanding Dance	Bang Jali Dance	Nominated
2014	Indonesian Dangdut Awards	Most Popular Dangdut Dance	Bang Jali Dance	Nominated
2014	YKS Romantic Awards	Most Shocked Appearance	Denny Cagur	Nominated
2014	YKS Romantic Awards	Most Romantic Couple	Denny Cagur & Santi Widihastuti	Won
2014	Panasonic Gobel Awards	Favorite Comedian	Denny Cagur	Won
2014	Global Seru Awards	Most Exciting Presenter	Denny Cagur	Nominated
2014	Global Seru Awards	Most Exciting Comedian	Denny Cagur	Won
2014	Anugerah Musik Indonesia	Best Contemporary Dangdut Male Solo Artist	"Goyang Bang Jali"	Nominated
2014	Anugerah Musik Indonesia	Best Malay Dangdut/Contemporary Dangdut/Dangdut Songwriter	"Goyang Bang Jali"	Nominated
2014	Anugerah Musik Indonesia	Best Malay Dangdut/Contemporary Dangdut/Dangdut Recording Producer	"Goyang Bang Jali"	Nominated
2014	Nickelodeon Indonesia Kids' Choice Awards	Favorite Comedian	Denny Cagur	Won
2014	Bintang RPTI Awards	Favorite Comedian	Denny Cagur	Nominated
2014	MNCTV Dangdut Awards	Most Popular Male Dangdut Singer	"Goyang Bang Jali"	Nominated
2015	Dahsyatnya Awards	Outstanding Couple	Denny Cagur & Santi Widihastuti	Nominated
2015	Dahsyatnya Awards	Outstanding Dangdut Singer	Denny Cagur	Nominated
2015	Dahsyatnya Awards	Outstanding Birthday	Denny Cagur's Birthday	Nominated
2015	Global Seru Awards	Most Exciting Comedian	Denny Cagur	Won
2015	Panasonic Gobel Awards	Favorite Comedian	Denny Cagur	Nominated
2015	Panasonic Gobel Awards	Favorite Music/Variety Show & Entertainment Presenter	Denny Cagur	Nominated
2016	Nickelodeon Indonesia Kids' Choice Awards	Favorite Comedian	Denny Cagur	Won
2016	Panasonic Gobel Awards	Favorite Quiz & Game Show/Talent Search/Reality Show Presenter	Baper	Nominated
2016	Panasonic Gobel Awards	Favorite Comedian	Happy Show	Won
2017	Nickelodeon Indonesia Kids' Choice Awards	Favorite Family Artist	Denny Cagur & Santi Widihastuti	Nominated
2017	Nickelodeon Indonesia Kids' Choice Awards	Favorite Presenter	Denny Cagur	Nominated
2017	Nickelodeon Indonesia Kids' Choice Awards	Favorite Comedian	Denny Cagur	Won
2017	Indonesian Television Awards	Most Popular Duet Presenter	Raffi Ahmad & Denny Cagur	Won
