= Ananda Omesh =

Indonesian television presenter

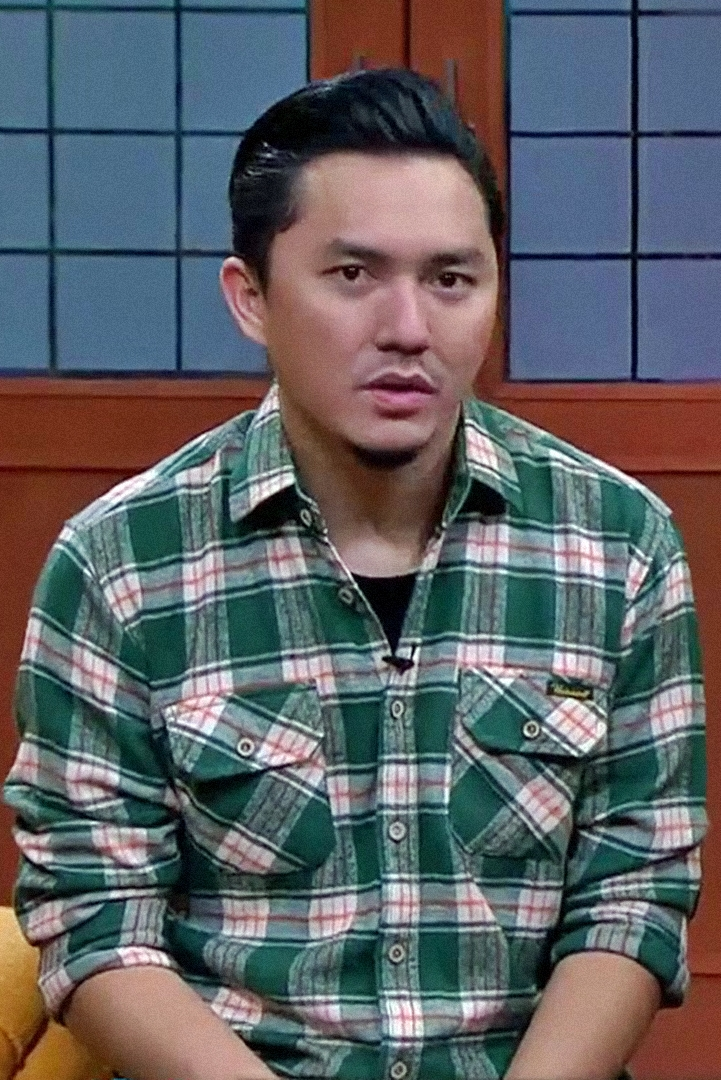
- Born: Ananda Rusdiana; August 21, 1986 (age 40); Sukabumi, West Java, Indonesia
- Other names: Omesh; Ananda Omesh
- Education: Padjadjaran University
- Occupations: Celebrity; Comedian; Presenter; Podcaster
- Years active: 2004 - present
- Spouse: Dian Ayu Lestari (m. 2012)
- Children: Btari Embun Anandayu; Btara Langit Anandayu; Btari Bulan Anandayu

Ananda Omesh, born Ananda Rusdiana (born August 21, 1986) is an Indonesian actor, comedian, and presenter. He is known for his work on the Trans TV variety show Extravaganza. He also has worked as a presenter on television shows such as 60 Minutes, Insert Pagi, Indonesia Mencari Bakat, and Missing Lyrics.

== Career ==
He had an interest in playing hip-hop music, but never pursued it as a career. He began as one of the cast of the variety show Extravaganza. He hosted the Trans TV talent search show Indonesia Mencari Bakat in its first until fourth season. He won "Favorite Talent Show Presenter" award at the 2011 Panasonic Gobel Awards and is often called to work as an MC on Indonesian television.

== Personal life ==
Ananda Omesh was born on August 21, 1986, in Sukabumi, West Java. He is an alumnus of the Faculty of Communication of Padjadjaran University. He married actress and news anchor Dian Ayu Lestari on July 8, 2012. They have one daughter and one son.

== Filmography ==
=== Film ===
Year	Title	Role	Notes
2009	Heart-Break.com	Wawan	Supporting role
2010	Aku Atau Dia	Wawan	Supporting role
2012	Mama Cake	Rakha	Lead role
2013	Coboy Junior: The Movie	Host Explode	Supporting role
2014	Mengejar Malam Pertama	Doni	Lead role
2014	Hijrah Cinta	Yosi	Supporting role
2015	Hijab	Ujul	Supporting role
2015	Anak Kost Dodol		Supporting role
2015	The Wedding & Bebek Betutu	Bagas Wicaksono	Lead role
2020	Sabar Ini Ujian	Billy	Lead role

=== Television ===
- Extravaganza (Trans TV)
- 60 Minutes (Trans 7)
- Indonesia Mencari Bakat (Trans TV)
- Insert Pagi (Trans TV)
- Missing Lyrics (Trans TV)
- Sinden Gosip (Trans TV)
- On the Spot Trans 7)
- Raja Gombal (Trans 7)
- Yuk Keep Smile (Trans TV)
- WOWW (Trans TV)
- Late Night Show with Omesh (B Channel)
- On The Show with Omesh (RTV)
- Sahurnya Ramadhan (Trans TV)
- Ngabuburit (Trans TV)
- Funny Olympic (Trans TV)
- Funny Sports (Trans TV)
- Kuis Siapa Dia? (Trans 7)
- I Music (RCTI)
- Ini Sahur (NET.)
- Celebrity Lipsync Combat (NET.)
- The Voice Kids Indonesia (Global TV)
- The Price is Right Indonesia (RCTI)
- Kecil-Kecil Hebat (Trans7)
- Komedi Sahur (Trans TV)
- Indonesia Morning Show (NET.)
- Kuis Keren BKKBN (GTV)
- Anak Cerdas Indonesia (Trans 7)
- Family 100 Indonesia (GTV)
- The Voice Indonesia (GTV)
- Super Deal Indonesia (GTV)
- New Comedy Night Live (NET.)
- Ini Weekend (NET.)
- Dapur Panik (GTV)
- Water Break (NET.)
- NET. On Top (NET.)
- eSports Star Indonesia (GTV)
- Anak Sekolah (Trans7)
- Klik (Trans7)
- Pesta Bola Dunia 2022 (SCTV, Indosiar & Moji)
- The Singing Bee Indonesia (RCTI)
- Dream Box Indonesia (Trans TV)
- Tonight Show Premiere (NET.)
- Para Pencari Cuan (Trans7)
- Gasskeun (NET.)
- KFC Mencari Bucket (NET.)

== Awards and nominations ==
Year	Awards	Category	Recipients	Results
2011	Panasonic Gobel Awards	Favorite Talent Show Presenter	Indonesia Mencari Bakat	Won
2014	YKS Romantic Award	Most Romantic Couple	Ananda Omesh & Dian Ayu	Nominated
2014	Panasonic Gobel Awards	Favorite Entertainment Program Presenter	Insert	Nominated
2015	Panasonic Gobel Awards	Favorite Quiz & Game Show Presenter	Siapa Dia?	Nominated
2015	Insert Fashion Awards	Most Fashionable Celebrity Couple	Ananda Omesh & Dian Ayu	Nominated
2015	Rumpi Awards	Favorite Infotainment Host	Insert	Nominated
2018	Indonesian Television Awards	Most Popular Presenter	Family 100 Indonesia	Nominated
2018	Panasonic Gobel Awards	Favorite Quiz & Game Show Presenter	Family 100 Indonesia	Won
2019	Panasonic Gobel Awards	Favorite Quiz & Game Show Presenter	Family 100 Indonesia	Nominated
2019	Panasonic Gobel Awards	Favorite Talent Show Presenter	The Voice Indonesia	Won
