= CT Corp =

Indonesian conglomerate corporation

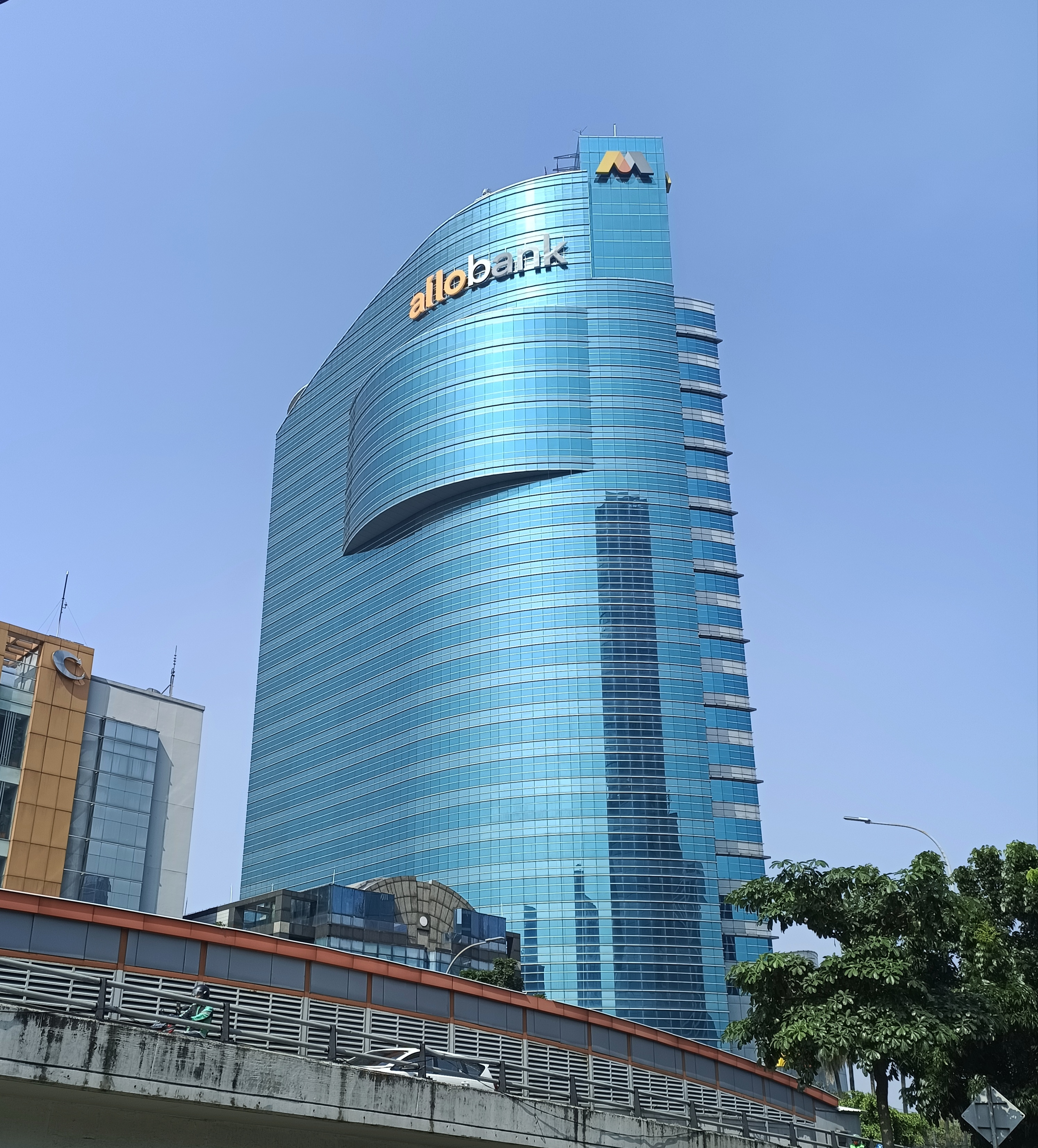
- Bank Mega Tower, Jakarta
- Formerly: Para Group (1987–2011)
- Company type: Private
- Industry: Conglomerate
- Founded: 1987; 39 years ago
- Founder: Chairul Tanjung
- Headquarters: Jakarta, Indonesia
- Key people: Chairul Tanjung (Chairman); Chairal Tanjung (Group Director)
- Products: Financial services Media; Retail; Property
- Owner: Chairul Tanjung
- Subsidiaries: Mega Corp; Trans Corp
- Website: ctcorpora.com

CT Corp (formerly known as Para Group) is one of Indonesia's largest diversified conglomerates. The group was founded by Chairul Tanjung in 1987. CT Corp operates consumer-centric businesses nationwide across four key industries: financial services, media and entertainment, retail, as well as property.

== History ==
=== Early history ===
CT Corp started out as a small children's shoes export business with a capital of Rp 150 million, which Chairul Tanjung obtained from Bank Exim.

=== Financial services ===
In 1996, CT Corp acquired Mega Bank and changed its name to Bank Mega. CT Corp also took over Bank Tugu and changed its name to Bank Mega Syariah.

On 28 March 2001, Bank Mega listed in the Indonesia Stock Exchange for Rp. 1,125 per share. Since then, Bank Mega has continued to be CT Corp's largest cash flow generator.

CT Corp's financial services arm continues to grow. It launched one of Indonesia's largest digital banks, Allo Bank (IDX: BBHI) on 20 May 2022.

=== Media ===
CT Corp's media business started with the operation of Trans TV, the group's earliest and oldest free-to-air TV channel. The turning point of Trans TV's success took place since the first quarter of 2002. According to a Nielsen Media Research survey, at that time, Trans TV was ranked fifth as the highest number of adverts from 10 television stations, namely Rp 149.2 billion.

Armed with performance success, and pegged to number two at the end of 2005, Trans TV made a memorandum of understanding to buy part of TV7 shares held Kompas Gramedia Group through its parent company Trans Corp in June 2006, and changed the name and identity of TV7 company to Trans7 on 15 December that year.

CT Corp also operates digital media companies, including Indonesia's largest local news source Detik.com. The group also operates CNN and CNBC Indonesia.

=== Retail ===
The group's major entry into retail was through the acquisition of 40% stake of Carrefour's Indonesia operation in 2010, which then fully acquired by CT Corp in January 2013. Since then, the stores have been rebranded as either "Transmart Carrefour" or "Transmart".

CT Corp also operates Metro department store, high-end retail stores (i.e Hugo Boss, Versace, Armani, Furla, Etienne Aigner, Tod's, Tommy Hilfiger, Valentino, Brioni, Jimmy Choo, Mango, Geox), as well as F&B segment (i.e The Coffee Bean & Tea Leaf, Wendy's, Baskin-Robbins).

=== Property ===
Hotels and resorts under the group, called Trans Hotels and Trans Resorts, are located in key cities in Indonesia, such as Bandung, Surabaya, and Bali.

The group also operates theme parks (Trans Snow World, Trans Studios), and small-format entertainment centers (Kid City).

=== Relationship ===
The group is known to have good relations with Anthoni Salim. Salim Group had been indebted when Para Group helped save Bank Central Asia, which was then hit by a financial crisis. With the Salim Group, Para Group partners in working on projects in Batam and Singapore. With Sinar Mas Group, Para Group also partners in the Mega Life life insurance company.

In Singapore, Para Group acquired a public company called Asia Medic, which is engaged in health care. Besides that, Para Group created a joint venture company called Gladifora. Whereas in Batam, (in collaboration with Arsikon) Para Group created a joint venture in the property sector, and has obtained a concession of around 300 hectares in a strategic location. The plan on this land will be built entertainment and residential centers. The housing is Coastarina.

=== Corporate identity changes ===
On 1 December 2011, Chairul Tanjung inaugurated the Para Group change to CT Corp. CT Corp consists of three sub holding companies: Mega Corp, Trans Corp, and CT Global Resources, which include financial services, media, retail, lifestyle, entertainment, and natural resources. Changing the name of this company also coincides with changes in the company's identity and logo. According to Chairul Tanjung, because it has been 30 years, there must be a transformation.

== Corporate governance ==
Shareholders of CT Corp include Chairul Tanjung and his family members, as well as Japanese conglomerate Mitsui & Co, which invested nearly $1 billion in CT Corp in 2021.

Global investors, including Singapore's sovereign wealth fund GIC Private Limited and World Bank's International Finance Corporation, hold direct and indirect stakes in CT Corp's subsidiaries.

== Business units ==
- PT Mega Corpora
  - PT Bank Mega Tbk
  - PT Bank Allo Indonesia Tbk
  - PT Bank Syariah Mega Indonesia
  - PT PFI Mega Life Insurance
  - PT Asuransi Umum Mega
  - Mega Capital Sekuritas
  - PT Mega Asset Management
  - PT Mega Capital Investama
  - PT Mega Finance
  - PT Mega Auto Finance
  - PT Mega Central Finance
- PT Trans Airways
  - Garuda Indonesia (28.27%)
    - Citilink
- PT Trans Corpora (Trans Corp)
  - PT Trans Media Corpora (Trans Media)
    - PT Televisi Transformasi Indonesia (Trans TV)
    - PT Duta Visual Nusantara Tivi Tujuh (Trans7)
    - PT Trans News Corpora (CNN Indonesia, CNNIndonesia.com)
    - PT Trans Berita Bisnis (CNBC Indonesia, CNBCIndonesia.com)
    - PT Trans Digital Media (Detik Network)
    - PT Indonusa Telemedia (Transvision)
    - PT Trans Rekan Media
    - PT Trans Entertainment
    - PT Trans Event Produksi (Trans Event)
  - PT Trans Fashion International (Trans Fashion)
    - PT Trans Fashion Indonesia, including PT Metropolitan Retailmart (Metro)
    - Trans Fashion Thailand Co Ltd
    - Wanmani Group Co Ltd
  - PT Trans Food & Beverage (Trans F&B)
  - PT Trans Retail Indonesia, including Transmart and PT Alfa Retailindo (Transmarket)
  - PT Trans Entertainment
- PT Trans Property Indonesia
  - Trans Park
  - PT Trans Studio
    - Trans Studio Bandung
    - Trans Studio Makassar
    - Trans Studio Bali
    - Trans Studio Cibubur
    - Trans Studio Resort Bandung
    - Trans Studio Resort Makassar
    - Trans Studio Resort Cibubur
  - Trans Snow World
    - Trans Snow World Bintaro
    - Trans Snow World Bekasi
    - Trans Snow World Surabaya
    - Trans Snow World Makassar
    - Trans Snow World Lampung
  - Trans Studio Ski World
  - PT Trans Mall Property, including Trans Studio Mall Cibubur
  - PT Trans Hotel Internasional Indonesia
  - Trans City
  - Gedung Trans Media
  - Gedung Transvision
  - Menara Bank Mega
  - Menara Bank Mega Kuningan
  - Menara Bank Mega Bandung
  - Menara Bank Mega Semarang
  - Menara Bank Mega Makassar
  - Menara Mega Syariah
  - Wisma Trans Lifestyle
  - Graha Trans Coffee
  - Masjid Agung Trans Studio Bandung
- PT CT Agro Indonesia (CT Agro)
- AntaVaya Group
- PT CT Corp Infrastruktur Indonesia
- PT CT Corp Digital Indonesia (CT Corp Digital)
- CT Arsa Foundation
