= Wendy Armoko =

Indonesian rapper, actor, presenter and comedian

Wendy Cagur
- Born: Wendy Armoko; May 8, 1979 (age 47); Jakarta, Indonesia
- Other name: Wendy Cagur
- Occupations: Celebrity; Rapper; Presenter; Comedian
- Years active: 2002 - present
- Spouse: Ayu Natasya
- Children: 3

Wendy Armoko, also known as Wendy Cagur (born May 8, 1979), is an Indonesian rapper, actor, presenter, and comedian. He is a member of band The Cagur Band, which was formed by members of the comedy group Cagur.

== Career ==
He began his career when he joined the comedy group Cagur in 2001. In 2009, he starred in the film Pijat Atas Tekan Bawah, with Kiki Fatmala and Cagur. He hosted the shows Tarung Dangdut, WOWW, and @Show_Imah. He appeared on the Trans TV show Yuk Keep Smile in 2013 - 2014.

In 2014, he was nominated in the category "Favorite Comedian" at the Panasonic Gobel Awards and the 2014 Nickelodeon Indonesia Kids' Choice Awards.

== Filmography ==
=== Film ===
Year	Title	Role	Notes
2009	Pijat Atas Tekan Bawah	Samuel	Supporting role

=== Television ===
Year	Title	Role	Notes	Network
2011	Tarung Dangdut	Himself	Presenter	MNCTV
2011	Saatnya Kita Sahur	Himself	Ramadhan comedy variety show	Trans TV
2011	Gara-Gara Wendy	Himself	Comedy show	Global TV
2011 - 2013	Pesbukers	Himself	Comedy variety show	ANTV
2011 - 2012	Comedy Project	Himself	Comedy show	Trans TV
2012	Waktunya Kita Sahur	Himself	Ramadhan comedy variety show	Trans TV
2012	Intermezzo	Himself	Talkshow	MNCTV
2012 - 2013	Opera Van Java	Himself	Comedy show	Trans 7
2013	Follow Cagur	Himself	Comedy talkshow	ANTV
2013	WOWW	Himself	Traveling show	Trans TV
2013	Campur-Campur Season 2	Himself	Talkshow	ANTV
2013	Yuk Kita Sahur	Himself	Ramadhan comedy variety show	Trans TV
2013 - 2014	@Show_Imah	Himself	Talkshow	Trans TV
2013 - 2014	Yuk Keep Smile	Himself	Comedy variety show	Trans TV
2013	Sabtu Minggu Seru	Himself		Trans 7
2014	Ceplas Ceplos	Himself	Comedy show	Trans 7
2014	Slide Show	Himself	Variety games show	Trans TV
2014	Sahurnya Ramadhan	Mafioso	Ramadhan comedy variety show	Trans TV
2014	Ngabuburit	Himself	Comedy variety show	Trans TV
2014	Obras (Obrolan Santai)	Himself		Trans 7
2014	Lenong Rempong	Himself	Comedy show	Trans 7
2014	The Blusukan	Himself	Comedy reality show	Trans TV
2014	Basa Basi	Himself	Talkshow	Trans TV
2018–present	Brownis (Obrowlan Manis)	Himself	Talkshow	Trans TV
2021–present	Pas Buka	Himself	Comedy show	Trans 7
2021–present	Lapor Pak	Policeman/Himself	Comedy Sitcoms	Trans 7
2021–present	BTS (bercanda Tapi Santai)	Himself	Comedy Show	Trans 7

== TV Commercial ==
Year	Title	Role
2005 - 2006	Sejati 12	Himself
2013	Suzuki Karimun Wagon R	Himself
2014	Hemaviton Jreng	Himself
2015	Sosis Champ	Himself

== Awards and nominations ==
Year	Awards	Category	Recipients	Results
2011	Insert Awards	The Funniest Celebrity	Wendy Cagur	Nominated
2014	YKS Romantic Award	Most Shocked Appearance	Wendy Cagur	Nominated
2014	YKS Romantic Award	Most Romantic Couple	Wendy Cagur	Nominated
2014	YKS Romantic Award	Most Surprised Artist	Wendy Cagur	Nominated
2014	Panasonic Gobel Awards	Favorite Comedian	Wendy Cagur	Nominated
2014	Global Seru Awards	Most Exciting Comedian	Wendy Cagur	Nominated
2014	Nickelodeon Indonesia Kids' Choice Awards	Favorite Comedian	Wendy Cagur	Nominated
