= Transvision (Indonesia) =

Indonesian direct broadcast satellite provider

PT Indonusa Telemedia
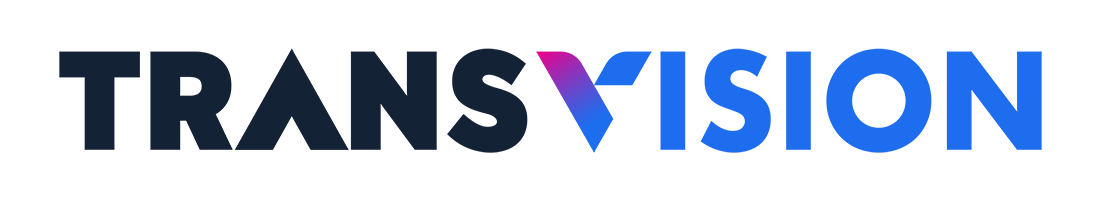

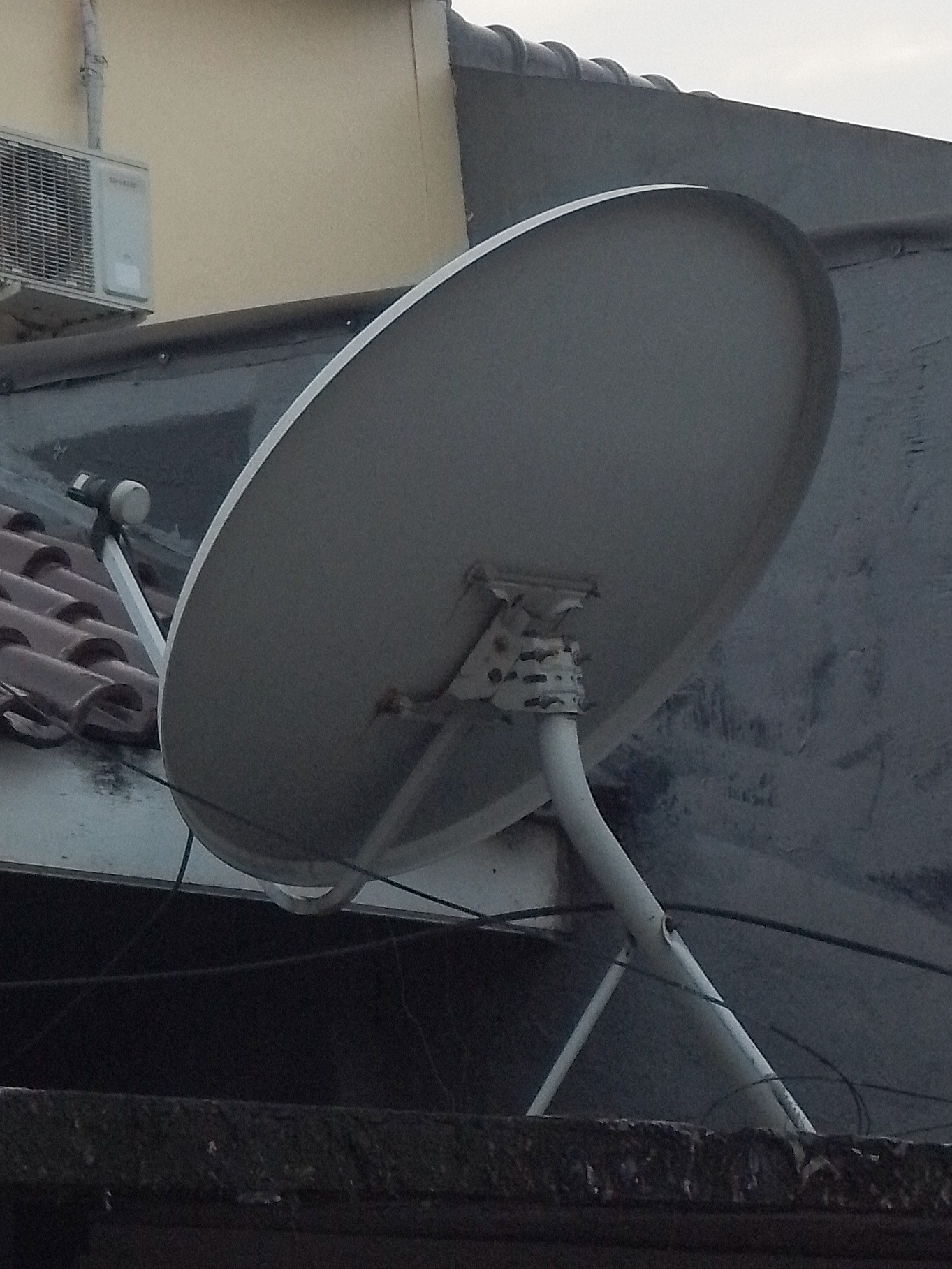
- Transvision Satellite Dish (2016-19 model)
- Trade name: Transvision
- Formerly: TelkomVision (1997–2014); YesTV (2009–2014)
- Type: Subsidiary
- Industry: Satellite television Internet protocol television Internet service provider
- Founded: 7 May 1997; 29 years ago
- Headquarters: Jakarta, Indonesia
- Area served: Indonesia
- Key people: Chairul Tanjung (President Commissioner); Ishadi S.K. (Commissioner); Peter F. Gontha (Co-founder and President Director); Atiek Nur Wahyuni (Vice President Director); Hengkie Liwanto (Director)
- Brands: Transvision Satellite; Nusantara HD; XStream; Transvision Hi-Speed; CubMu
- Parent: Trans Media
- Website: www.transvision.co.id

PT Indonusa Telemedia, operating as Transvision (formerly TelkomVision and YesTV), is a subscription-based direct broadcast satellite service provider in Indonesia. It is primarily owned by Trans Media, a subsidiary of CT Corp, and the founding company Telkom Indonesia via TelkomMetra as the minority holder. Transvision currently airing through MEASAT-3b satellite (via K_{u} band frequency) since 2016, and also via internet protocol (IPTV) under the name Transvision XStream.

Aside from providing satellite TV (under the name Transvision Satellite and its slimmed-down version, Nusantara HD) and the XStream IPTV service (similar to Telkom's IndiHome TV), Transvision also operates an internet service named Hi-Speed. The company also have its own OTT stearming service, CubMu, which is set to compete against Vidio and Vision+ (the latter owned by Transvision's long rival, MNC Vision). The company's slogan is Broadcasting at The Edge of Technology.

== History ==
PT Indonusa Telemedia was established on 7 May 1997, under the brand name TelkomVision, by a consortium of shareholders, including PT Telekomunikasi Indonesia Tbk (Telkom), PT Telekomindo Primabhakti (part of Rajawali Corpora), PT Rajawali Citra Televisi Indonesia (RCTI), and PT Datakom Asia. (Note: Datakom Asia is a consortium including Anthoni Salim, Peter F. Gontha, and Indosat.) Operations commenced in December 1998 with the early 200 subscribers.

By 2003, Telkom became the principal shareholder, holding 98.75% of TelkomVision shares, with the remaining 1.25% owned by Datakom. As of 31 December 2011, 99,54% shares held by Telkom, while the remaining 0,46% was owned by PT. Multimedia Nusantara (METRA).

In 2009, a slimmed-down service called YesTV was launched. As of April 2011, TelkomVision had 200,000 subscribers. On 4 June of the same year, TelkomVision launched an IPTV service named Groovia TV, claimed to be the first of its kind in Indonesia, offering mobile TV and interactive content experience.

The third and final logo of TelkomVision (2009–2014)

Transvision's inaugural logo (2014–2021)

In 2013, Trans Corp CEO Chairul Tanjung bought 80% of TelkomVision's share despite being opposed by the House of Representatives. Then-Minister of State-Owned Enterprises Dahlan Iskan made an intervention to the acquisition process. TelkomVision was considered stagnant in its revenue though has a well prospect as a senior in satellite TV industry. The content development would be handled by Trans Corp, while Telkom focused on infrastructure provision. After the acquisition process completed, YesTV was merged to the main service, and Groovia TV was fully transferred to Telkom Indonesia and rebranded as USee TV (now IndiHome TV) as of 15 February 2014. Later, on 14 May 2014, TelkomVision changed its name to Transvision, as Telkom held only 20% ownership, with Trans Media emerging as the primary stakeholder, holding 80%.

Until 2016, Transvision was airing via Telkom-1 satellite with C-band frequency since the TelkomVision era. After Trans Media's acquisition, Tranvision began to migrate to MEASAT-3b satellite with K_{u} band frequency, while simultaneously broadcasting via existing C-band during the transition process. In 2016, Transvision has fully migrated to MEASAT-3b, encouraging all C-band subscribers (mostly since the pre-acquisition era) to migrate to the new frequency.

In 2018, Transvision held the rights to broadcast the 2018 FIFA World Cup, alongside Trans TV and Trans7, providing World Cup-exclusive channels named the World Cup Channel. Its founding company Telkom also held the broadcasting rights.

On 6 March 2020, Transvision launched a new Android-based IPTV service named Transvision XStream, to appease increasing demands of OTT streaming services during the COVID-19 pandemic.

In November 2021, Toonz Media Group launched a bilingual kids' channel called "Toonz Kids", dubbed in Indonesian.

In July 2023, KC Global Media pulled several channels (notably AXN, Animax, One, and Gem) from Transvision, citing "non-payment of contractual obligations".
