= Caisar Putra Aditya =

Indonesian comedian, dancer, and actor (born 1989)

- Born: August 29, 1989 (age 36); Jakarta, Indonesia
- Other names: Caisar Keep Smile
- Occupations: Actor; dancer; comedian
- Years active: 2013–Sekarang
- Spouse: Indadari Mindrayanti (m. 2014)
- Children: Nokia Alike Putri Hakim (step child); Kipsmail Aditya Harnano
- Parent(s): Dadang Iskandar; Nani Suryati Ningsih (alm)

Caisar Putra Aditya known as Caisar Keep Smile (born August 29, 1989) is an Indonesian comedian, dancer, and actor. He became popular since performing the Caisar dance in Yuk Keep Smile. In March 2015, he stated he is leaving the world of entertainment to focus on his personal life and a career in business.

== Personal life ==
Caisar Putra Aditya born on August 29, 1989, in Jakarta, Indonesia. He is the only child of Dadang Iskandar and Nani Suryati Ningsih. He married Indadari Mindrayanti on April 5, 2014, in Lampung. Caisar's wife is ex-girlfriend of the comedian Aming, and former spouse of the politician and actor, Lucky Hakim. They have one stepson and one child of their own.

== Filmography ==
=== Film ===
Year	Title	Role	Notes
2014	Jomblo Keep Smile	Borris	

=== Television ===
Year	Title	Role	Notes	Network
2008–2010	Tawa Sutra XL	Himself	Guest star	ANTV
2013	Yuk Kita Sahur	Himself	Dancer	Trans TV
2013–2014	Yuk Keep Smile	Himself	Dancer	Trans TV
2013–2014	@Show_Imah	Himself	Talkshow	Trans TV
2014	Sahurnya Ramadhan	Ma'e son	Ramadhan comedy variety show	Trans TV
2014	Ngabuburit	Himself	Comedy variety show	Trans TV
2015	ASAL (Asli Atau Palsu)	Himself	Guest star	Trans 7

== Awards and nominations ==
Year	Awards	Category	Recipients	Result
2014	YKS Romantic Award	Most Lulled Artist	Caisar	Nominated
