= Kiwil =

Indonesian comedian

- Born: Wildan Delta
- Occupations: Celebrity, Comedian
- Spouse(s): Rochimah (m. 1998 - div. 2020); Meggy Wulandari (m. 2005 - div. 2020 ) Venti Figianti (m.2022 - )

Wildan Delta, also known as Kiwil, is an Indonesian actor and comedian of Minangkabau descent. His first film appearance was in the horror film Tiren: Mati Kemaren in 2008.

== Career ==
Kiwil began his career as a stand up comedian and film actor in Indonesia. He has since appeared in the films Tulalit, Paku Kuntilanak, Setan Budeg, and Nenek Gayung. Kiwil also become one of the cast of the Indonesian comedy show Yuk Keep Smile.

== Personal life ==
Kiwil married his first wife, Rochimah, on February 28, 1998, and they have four sons. His second wife is Meggy Wulandari.

== Filmography ==
=== Film ===
Year	Title	Role	Notes
2008	Tiren: Mati Kemaren	Kiwil	Cameo
2008	Tulalit	Kiwil	Supporting role
2008	Setan Budeg	Mr. Joko	Supporting role
2009	Paku Kuntilanak	Mr. Joko	Supporting role
2012	Nenek Gayung		Supporting role
2013	Pokun Roxy	Jono	Supporting role

=== Television ===
Year	Title	Role	Notes	Network
1997 - 2001	Spontan	Himself	Sitcom show	SCTV
2007 - 2011	Saatnya Kita Sahur	Himself	Ramadhan comedy variety show	Trans TV
2012	Waktunya Kita Sahur	Himself	Ramadhan comedy variety show	Trans TV
2013	Yuk Kita Sahur	Himself	Ramadhan comedy variety show	Trans TV
2013 - 2014	Yuk Keep Smile	Himself	Comedy variety show	Trans TV
2014	Sahurnya Ramadhan	Assistant Headman/Trio Macho Member	Ramadhan comedy variety show	Trans TV
2014 - 2015	Ngabuburit	Himself	Comedy variety show	Trans TV
2015	The Blusukan	Himself	Comedy variety show	Trans TV
2015–present	Duel Maut	Himself		Trans TV
2017 - 2018	Kun Anta (Season 1)	Pak De Dayat	Kids Cinetron	MNCTV
