= Detik.com =

Indonesian digital media company

detikcom
- Website type: Entertainment, news
- Available in: Indonesian
- Founded: July 9, 1998; 28 years ago
- Country of origin: Indonesia
- Owner: Trans Media
- Key people: Alfito Ginting (Content Director; Editor-in-chief)
- Website: www.detik.com
- Current status: Active

detik.com (stylized as detikcom in all-lowercase) is an Indonesian digital media company owned by Trans Media, a business unit of CT Corp. Detikcom is an online news portal and publishes breaking news. The portal is consistently ranked among Indonesia's 10 most-visited websites and is among the top 250 in the world. It receives approximately 180 million visits per day. A 2021 Reuters Institute survey ranked Detikcom as the most widely used online news source in Indonesia out of 16 top outlets.

== History ==
Detikcom has its roots in DeTIK, which was Indonesia's top-selling and most critical political tabloid in the early 1990s. DeTIK was effectively banned on 21 June 1994, when Information Minister Harmoko withdrew its publication license together with Tempo and Editor magazine. DeTIK had upset the repressive regime of long-serving president Suharto by publishing interviews with senior military officers who were critical of civilian politicians. The tabloid had also dared to speculate on who would succeed Suharto.

Following the resignation of Suharto on 21 May 1998, some journalists decided to set up an online news portal. Detikcom was originally founded by Budi Darsono (former Tempo and DeTIK journalist), Yayan Sopyan (former DeTIK journalist), Abdul Rahman (former SWA journalist), and Didi Nugrahadi. The domain name detik.com became active on 29 May 1998, however the site did not start producing content until 9 July 1998, which is considered its founding date. The founders focused on continuously updating breaking news, as well as more analytical news articles. Detikcom's first office was a small room at Lebak Bulus Stadium in South Jakarta.

On 3 August 2011, Detikcom was acquired by Trans Media under CT Corp, owned by Chairul Tanjung.

In 2019, Detikcom expanded into a media group called Detik Network, which consists of CNN Indonesia, CNBC Indonesia, Haibunda, Female Daily, Beautynesia, and insertlive.
