= Mampang Prapatan =

District in South Jakarta, Indonesia

- District
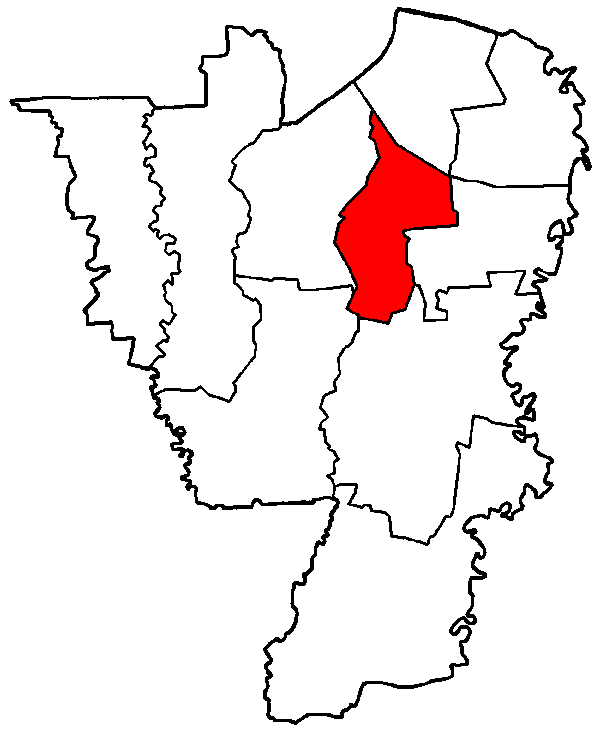
- The district of Mampang Prapatan in South Jakarta
- Country: Indonesia
- Province: Jakarta
- Administrative city: South Jakarta

Mampang Prapatan is a district in the administrative city of South Jakarta, Indonesia. The expatriate residential areas of Bangka and Kemang, known for their annual Kemang Festival, are located in the Mampang Prapatan District. The boundaries of Mampang Prapatan are Krukut River to the west, Cideng River and Mampang River to the east, Jalan Jenderal Gatot Subroto Tollway to the north, and Kemang Selatan-Kemang Timur Road to the south. Mampang Prapatan Main Road passed through Mampang Prapatan District. The expatriate neighborhood Kemang partly located in this district.

== Subdistricts ==
The district of Mampang Prapatan is divided into five kelurahan or administrative villages:

- Kuningan Barat - area code 12710
- Pela Mampang - area code 12720
- Bangka - area code 12730
- Tegal Parang - area code 12790
- Mampang Prapatan - area code 12790

== Landmarks ==
- Kemang
- Lippo Mall Kemang
- Al Barkah Mosque, built in 1818, one of the few mosques built in traditional Javanese architecture
- Indonesian Institute of Sciences
- Museum TNI-AD "Satria Mandala", or Satria Mandala Museum
- Trans Media (Trans TV, Trans7, CNN Indonesia and CNBC Indonesia) headquarter
