= Chairul Tanjung =

Indonesian businessman and bureaucrat

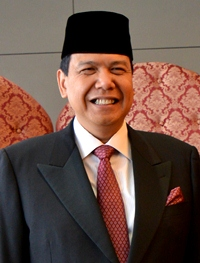
- Born: 18 June 1962 (age 64); Jakarta, Indonesia
- Education: University of Indonesia
- Occupation: Entrepreneur
- Known for: Founder of CT Corp
- Title: Chairman, CT Corp
- Spouse: Anita Ratnasari Tanjung
- Children: Putri Indahsari Tanjung; Rahmat Dwiputra Tanjung

Coordinating Minister for Economic Affairs
- In office 19 May 2014 – 27 October 2014
- President: Susilo Bambang Yudhoyono
- Preceded by: Hatta Rajasa
- Succeeded by: Sofyan Djalil

Signature
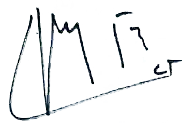

Chairul Tanjung (born 18 June 1962) is an Indonesian businessman. He was the former Coordinating Minister for Economics in the Indonesian cabinet. He was appointed to this post by President Susilo Bambang Yudhoyono on 19 May 2014 following the resignation of the previous Coordinating Minister for Economics, Hatta Rajasa, who resigned to take part in Indonesia's 2014 presidential election. In 2024, he had an estimated net worth of $5.2 billion.

== Early life ==
Chairul Tanjung was born in Jakarta to A. G. Tanjung and Halimah. His father, a reporter, had established a magazine company, which was shut down by the Suharto regime, resulting in A.G. Tanjung having to sell the family's large house and cars to cover debt, and the family moved into a small apartment. Chairul graduated from Boedi Oetomo Senior High School in 1981. He obtained a bachelor's degree at the Faculty of Dentistry, University of Indonesia. He was named a "national noble student" in 1984 and 1985. While studying, he and his two friends opened a shop that originally sold books and T-shirts, and expanded to sell medical equipment. In his spare time, Chairul conducted business until graduating from dentistry school, and establishing PT CT Corp with a loan of Rp 150 million from Exim Bank. They produced children's footwear and received an order from Italy for 160 pairs of shoes, but a month later, Chairul split from his two friends because a disagreement over the business. He later became the chairman and founder of CT Corp.

== Business ==
He worked with Hasbi Hafani to establish the business. He bought Bank Karman and changed its name to Bank Mega. He expanded his business interests into insurance and securities. Chairul is now involved in the television business; he founded Trans TV and acquired TV 7 from the Kompas-Gramedia Group. Chairul owns property projects such as Bandung Super Mall, Batam Indah Prospertindo, Para Bali Propertindo, and Mega Indah Propertindo. In 2012, he bought a minority share of Garuda Indonesia. His holding company is CT Corp., formerly Para Group, with 3 sub-holdings:

- Mega Corp which oversees Financial Services in 3 main operations:
  - Financial Services: Bank Mega, Bank Sulut, Bank Sulteng, Allo Bank
  - Insurance: Mega Jiwa, Mega Insurance, PFI Mega Life (partners with Pramerica (Prudential Financial))
  - Financing: Mega Auto Finance, Mega Central Finance
- Trans Corp which oversees 2 main operations:
  - Media, which operates television channels of Trans TV, Trans7, CNN Indonesia, CNBC Indonesia, digital media Detik.com, Insertlive.com, Haibunda.com, Female Daily, and Direct broadcast satellite of Transvision.
  - Retail, which operates Transmart (acquired from Carrefour's Indonesia operation) and Metro department store
  - Fashion: operates specialty stores of Aigner Munich, Hugo Boss, Canali, Find Kapoor, Furla, Geox, Bimba Y Lola, and previously operated Mango, Hugo Boss, Versace, Armani, Furla, Etienne Aigner, Tod's, Tommy Hilfiger, Valentino, Brioni, Jimmy Choo.
  - F&B: such as The Coffee Bean & Tea Leaf, Wendy's, Baskin-Robbins
  - Property, which includes Trans Studio Malls, Trans Park, and hotel chains of Trans Luxury, and licensed hotel chains from Ibis, and FashionTV.
- Other Investments, include:
  - Plantations: which oversees palm oil plantations operations, such as: CT Plantations, CT Agro, CT Global Resources
  - Transportations: with the investment in Garuda Indonesia, Indonesia's flag-carrier (and its low-cost carrier subsidiary, Citilink)

== Other activities ==
Chairul Tanjung served as head of Badminton Association of Indonesia from 2001 to 2004.

== Biography ==
A biography of Chairul Tanjung, Chairul Tanjung Si Anak Singkong ("Chairul Tanjung the Cassava Child," "cassava" meaning "socially inferior"), was published in 2012.

Political offices
Preceded by Hatta Rajasa	Coordinating Minister for Economic Affairs; 2014	Succeeded by Sofyan Djalil
