= CNN Indonesia =

Indonesian television news network

- Country: Indonesia
- Broadcast area: Nationwide
- Network: CNN
- Headquarters: Trans Media Building; Jalan Kapten Pierre Tendean No. 12-14A, Mampang Prapatan, South Jakarta

Programming
- Language: Indonesian
- Picture format: 1080i HDTV

Ownership
- Owner: PT Trans News Corpora, with license from Skydance
- Parent: CT Corp (Trans Media)
- Sister channels: CNN; CNN International; Antena 3 CNN; CNN-News18; CNN Türk; CNN en Español; CNN Brazil; CNN Portugal; CNNj; CNN Prima News; A2 CNN; HLN; CNN Chile; Trans TV; Trans7; CNBC Indonesia

History
- Launched: 17 August 2015 (television broadcast); 15 December 2015 (official launch)
- Former names: Detik TV (2012–2014)

Links
- Website: cnnindonesia.com

Availability

Terrestrial
- Digital Greater Jakarta: 40 (UHF); Channel 19
- Digital Regional branches: Check local frequencies (in Indonesian language)

Streaming media
- Official: Watch live
- IndiHome TV: Watch live (IndiHome customers only)

CNN Indonesia Online
- Website type: News
- Available in: Indonesian
- Founded: October 20, 2014; 12 years ago
- Headquarters: Jakarta
- Country of origin: Indonesia
- Owners: PT Trans News Corpora (Trans Media with license from Skydance)
- Website: www.cnnindonesia.com
- Current status: Active

Cable News Network Indonesia, also known as CNN Indonesia and abbreviated as CNN ID, is a 24-hour Indonesian free-to-air television news channel, owned by Trans Media in collaboration with Skydance under a CNN license. Broadcasting from Trans Media studios in South Jakarta, the local franchise presents national and international content, focusing on general news, business, sports, and technology.

The TV programs are aired 24 hours a day via digital terrestrial TV networks, pay-TV providers Transvision and IndiHome nationwide, and live streaming services for overseas viewers.

== History ==
The logo used from 2015 to 2023, as the on-air logo. It is still used on its official website and advertisement of their TV programs, as well as its corporate logo.

In 2007, Trans Media planned to develop a news-oriented web TV network called Detik TV, which was named after the online news portal detik.com (which was acquired by Trans Media in 2011). It would broadcast entertainment and news programs, with some of the news content taken from Trans TV's Reportase and Trans7's Redaksi news programs. Some time later, Detik TV was planned to become a digital free-to-air terrestrial news TV network. In 2009, businessman Chairul Tanjung announced a strategic partnership between Trans Media and then-owner of the CNN trademark, Turner Broadcasting System of Time Warner, to launch of the latter branded channel in Indonesia. Plans for the Detik TV network were then abandoned in favor of the new CNN Indonesia franchise.

CNN Indonesia began as an online portal, cnnindonesia.com, on 20 October 2014. It made its soft launch as a news channel on the 70th anniversary of the country's Proclamation of Independence (17 August 2015); the official launch day was held in conjunction with Trans Media's 14th for airing and 17th anniversary for corporate and official original birth date (15 December 2015). Yusuf Arifin was its first editor-in-chief.

== Programmes ==
=== News ===
- CNN Indonesia Breaking News
- CNN Indonesia Today
- CNN Indonesia New Day
- CNN Indonesia News Hour
- CNN Indonesia Newsroom
- Good Morning (Simulcast with Trans TV)
- Good Morning Weekend
- CNN Indonesia World Now
- CNN Indonesia News Update (Simulcast with Trans TV)
- CNN Indonesia Prime News
- CNN Indonesia Lacak Kriminal
- CNN Indonesia Sports
- CNN Indonesia Tech
- CNN Indonesia Business
- Redaksi Pagi (Simulcast with Trans7)
- Redaksi Pagi Akhir Pekan (Simulcast with Trans7)
- Redaksi (Simulcast with Trans7)
- Redaksi Akhir Pekan (Simulcast with Trans7)
- Redaksi Malam (Simulcast with Trans7)
- Redaksi Malam CNN Indonesia (Saturday only)

=== Talkshows ===
- Insight with Desi Anwar
- Final Notes with Desi Anwar
- Indonesia New Chapter
- Inside Story with Diana Valencia
- Prime Plus with Bram Herlambang
- Head to Head with Elvira
- EconoMic with Rully Kurniawan

=== Documentaries ===
- CNN Indonesia Heroes

=== Religious ===
- Gapai Kemuliaan

=== Special Programmes ===
- Live Event News
- Special Program
- Indonesia Forward
- CNN Indonesia Awards
