= Handika =

Handika is an Indonesian surname. Notable people with the surname include:

- Caca Handika (born 1957), Indonesian dangdut singer
- Fajar Handika (born 1990), Indonesian footballer
- Rakasurya Handika (born 2000), Indonesian footballer
