= D'academy Asia 2 =

D'academy Asia 2 is an Indonesian singing competition television series created by Indra Yudhistira, produced by his company Indonesia Entertainment Production, and distributed by Emtek. It premiered on Indosiar on October 23, 2016, and ended on December 29, 2016. The show involved six Asian nations as competitors: Indonesia, Thailand, Malaysia, Brunei, East Timor, and Singapore. It became one of the most popular musical competitions in the Asia-Pacific region. The concept of the series involves stars and celebrities from six nations singing a genre of Indonesian folk music called 'Dangdut'. The winner is chosen by a panel of six judges from each nation who vote on whether each contestant will pass to the next level or be eliminated. The current winner is Weni Wahyuni from Indonesia

== Judges ==
D'academy Asia 2 employed a panel of judges who critiqued the contestants' performances. The original judges were:

- Fashion guru Ivan Gunawan (Indonesia)
- Soimah Pancawati (Indonesia)
- Mas Idayu (Malaysia)
- Rosalina Musa (Singapore)
- Iis Dahlia (Indonesia)
- Kun Yee (Thailand)
- Ifa Raziah (Malaysia)
- Anito Matos (East Timor)
- Hans Anwar (Brunei)

Notable guest judges included "Queen of Dangdut" Elvy Sukaesih from Indonesia, "Asian Star" Siti Nurhaliza from Malaysia, "Dangdut Professor" Ikke Nurjanah from Indonesia, and many more.

== Reception ==
The success of D'academy Asia 2 has been described as a "unity of diversity in Southeast Asian broadcasting history". The series was also said by a rival TV executive to be "the most magnificent show in the history of Southeast_Asia television". The show has achieved recognition from the governments of the nations involved, and many government officials from each country follow the competition to root for their contestants.
