= Kemang, Jakarta =

Coordinates: 6.2608°S 106.8208°E

Kemang
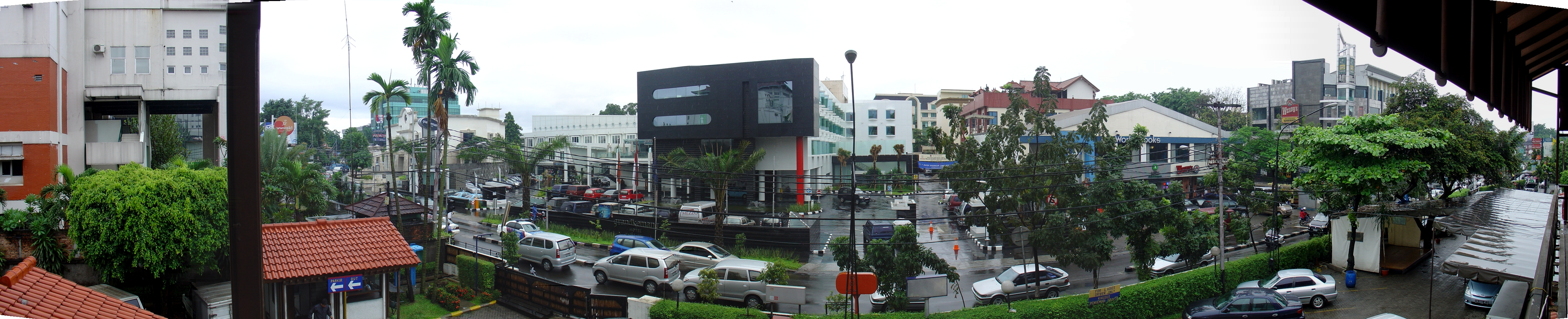
- Kemang Raya Street
- Interactive map of Kemang
- Country: Indonesia
- Province: Jakarta
- Administrative city: South Jakarta

Kemang is a neighborhood in southern part of Jakarta, Indonesia. The area is located mostly in Bangka subdistrict of Mampang Prapatan and partly within Pejaten subdistrict of Pasar Minggu. The main area of Kemang is marked by the roads of Kemang Raya, Prapanca, and Bangka Streets.

== Etymology ==
The name Kemang came from the fruit kemang, a species of mango (Mangifera kemanga).

== History ==
Kemang was originally a kampung (village) which has been gentrified into an expatriate residential area. The gentrification of Kemang started after the end of the 1970s. The adjacent Bangka kampung, which was also gentrified, is sometimes referred as "Kemang" as well, although this was originally a different village. Kemang was a quiet Betawi kampong dotted with mosques in traditional Javanese style. During the 1970s, the land in Kemang was sold for residential use. The lush green character of Kemang attracted people into this area, including expatriates. The neighborhood is also close to Golden Triangle of Jakarta. This also makes it convenient for expats who need to get around town but can’t waste too much time in traffic each day.

In 1998, the then-Governor of Jakarta Sutiyoso changed the status of Kemang from a residential (as stated in the 1985–2005 city master plan) into a commercial area. In the following year, he strengthened the decision with the issuance of a decree declaring Kemang as a "modern kampong" (modern village). This brings more commercial activities into the area, as houses are converted into retails. Because of poor urban planning roads of this area are narrow, which suffer traffic congestion during busy hours. Also Kemang is prone to flooding during rainy season due to its location between two streams of Krukut River and Mampang River. It is expected that the flooding problem of the area will be resolved after completion of ongoing restoration project of Krukut river. Jakarta administration has undertaken a project to reorganize the roads and sidewalks of the area to facilitate as a tourist and culinary destination.

== Attractions ==
Since 1970s Kemang has grown into a bustling area known for its international-oriented facilities such as traditional craft retails and night clubs. Some of the original kampung still exists behind the high-class residential apartment and housing complex. This unique contrast between the original local community and the international expatriate community has created a laid-back typology that feels more like an old town than a new city. At present, Kemang is filled with businesses and homes, hotels, shopping malls, banks, food courts, restaurants, cafes and bars, salons, nightclubs and shops. There are also few international standard academic institutions to complete the neighborhood for expat living.

Kemang hosts the Kemang Festival, held once or twice every year since 2001. During the festival, roads in Kemang are pedestrianized and vendors fill the street offering traditional souvenirs, clothing, and food. Also. Grandkemang Hotel of the area hosts the Indonesian Contemporary Art & Design (ICAD) exhibition every year.

== Transportation ==
There are Transjakarta feeder services such as route 6N (Blok M-Ragunan via Kemang) and route 5N (Kampung Melayu–Ragunan).

== See also ==
- Mampang Prapatan, South Jakarta
- Pasar Minggu
- Kemang Village
