= Caca Handika =

Indonesian dangdut singer

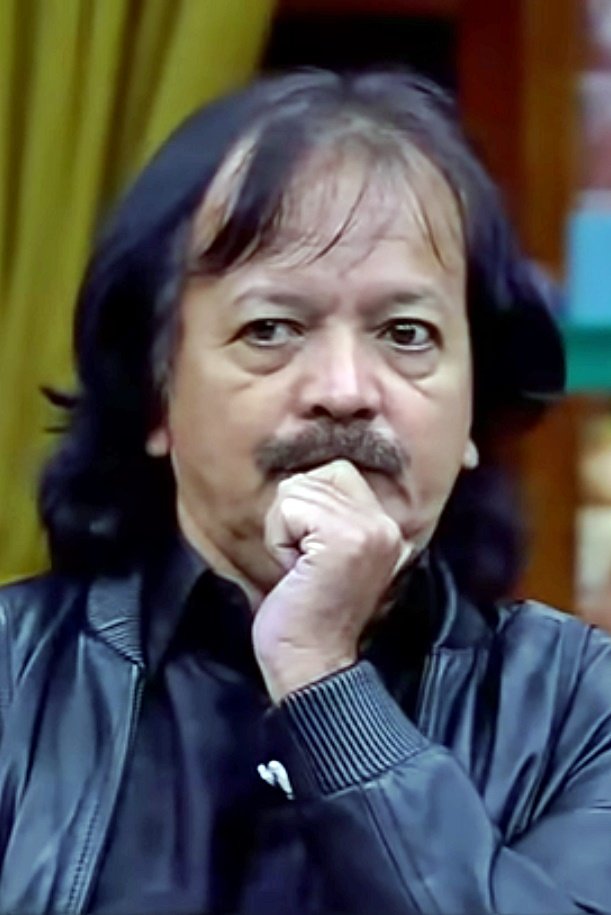
- Born: Caca Hermanto; December 29, 1957 (age 68); Tasikmalaya, West Java, Indonesia
- Occupations: Singer; musician; actor; comedian
- Years active: 1971–present
- Musical career
- Genres: dangdut
- Instrument: Vocals
- Labels: Gajah Mada Records; Blackboard; GP Records

Caca Hermanto, stage name Caca Handika, is an Indonesian dangdut singer. Some of his hit songs are Undangan Palsu, Mandi Kembang, and Bakar Kemenyan. In addition as dangdut singer, Handika also designs batik motifs. Handika had appeared on Yuk Keep Smile and other programs broadcast on Trans TV, such as Ngabuburit.

Handika had played a debut television soap opera on 2000 Tuyul dan Mbak Yul (only appeared in one episode) by RCTI, and in 2006 Handika also starred in a musical drama soap opera, titled Kampung Dangdut playing the role of Caca, the youngest brother of Bang Haji Rhoma (played by Rhoma Irama).

Currently, Handika is a vocal coach in an Indosiar' talent celebrity show D'Academy Celebrity.

== Discography ==
=== Studio albums ===
- Damailah (1991)
- Undangan Palsu (1992)
- Bakar Kemenyan (1996)
- Angka Satu (2011)
- Bajing Luncat (2015)

=== EP album ===
- Air Mata Bawang (2008)

=== Compilation albums ===
- 20 Dangdut Terbaik (2014)
- Super Hits Caca Handika (2014)
- Best of Caca Handika (2014)

== Filmography ==
Year	Title	Role	Notes	Broadcast
2013–2014	Yuk Keep Smile	Himself	Guest star	Trans TV
2014–2015	D'Terong Show	Himself	Guest judge	Indosiar
2016–present	D'Academy Celebrity	Himself	Vocal coach	Indosiar
