= Kemang Village =

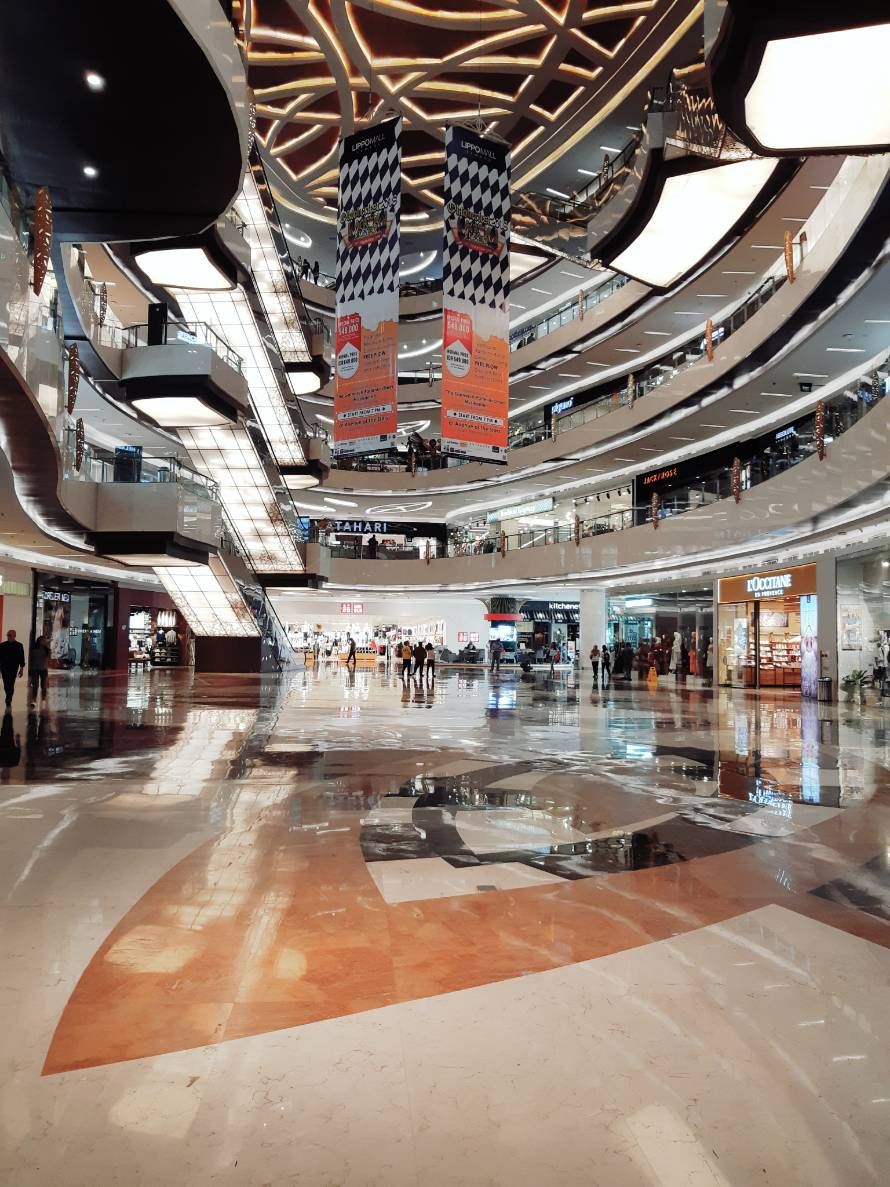
- Interior of Lippo Mall Kemang as an integral part of the Kemang Village
- Location: Jakarta, Indonesia
- Coordinates: 6.259418°S 106.811473°E
- Address: Jalan Pangeran Antasari No.36, Mampang Prapatan, South Jakarta
- Opened: September 26, 2012
- Developer: Lippo Group
- Num. of stores: 200+
- Num. of anchor tenants: 6
- Floor area: 650,000 m^{2} (7,000,000 sq ft) (The complex); 130,000 m^{2} (1,400,000 sq ft) (shopping mall)
- Floors: 41x7 (residences), 6+3 (mall)
- Website: kemangvillage.com

Kemang Village is an integrated development of vertical residences with a shopping mall named Lippo Mall Kemang, hotel, hospital, school, country club, and spa, located at Mampang Prapatan, South Jakarta, Indonesia. The complex has a land area of about 15.5 hectares (38 acres), which is developed by Lippo Group.

== Lippo Mall Kemang ==
The main anchors of the mall are Debenhams Department Store, Hypermart, Cinema XXI, Best Denki, Fitness First Platinum, Muji, and ACE Hardware. There other major tenants include Marks and Spencer, Timezone, iBox and Eatery Food Court. There are more than 200 fashion, entertainment, dining and lifestyle oriented tenants.

== See also ==
- Kemang, Jakarta
- List of shopping malls in Jakarta
- List of tallest buildings in Jakarta
