= Yuk Keep Smile =

- Genre: Variety show
- Starring: Olga Syahputra; Cinta Laura; Raffi Ahmad; Soimah Pancawati; Wendy Cagur; Denny Cagur; Adul Latief; Bily Syahputra; Bopak Castello; Caisar Aditya Putra; Ananda Omesh; Kiwil; Tarra Budiman; Chand Kelvin; Jenita Janet; Caca Handika; Andi Soraya
- Country of origin: Indonesia
- Original language: Indonesian

Production
- Producer: Muhammad Yustiana Sandi
- Running time: 180 minutes (official, may be even longer)

Original release
- Network: Trans TV
- Release: August 31, 2013 – June 27, 2014

Yuk Keep Smile (abbreviated as YKS) was an Indonesian variety show that aired on Trans TV. The show premiered on 31 August 2013, as the successor to Yuk Kita Sahur, which previously aired as the "suhur" show of Ramadan. The show hosted and starred musical guests, usually with notable dance routines. Cinta Laura was a notable talent that starred on the show, however left to finish her education abroad. The show was cancelled with last episode aired on 27 June 2014, after a controversy with the Indonesian Broadcasting Commission (KPI) over an incident where a hypnotist compared the late comedian Benyamin Sueb to a dog.

== Notable dances and songs on the programme ==
=== Dance ===
Dance	Song & Singers
Caesarian Dance	Song Buka Sitik Joss by Juwita Bahar
Kok Sepi Sih Dance	Song Kata Pujangga by Rhoma Irama
Kereta Malam Dance	Song Kereta Malam by Elvi Sukaesih
Simalakama Dance	Song Simalakama by Yopie Latul
Oplosan Dance	Song Oplosan by Nur Bayan
Bang Jali Dance	Song Bang Jali by Denny Cagur
Medley Dance	Renmix Dance of Song Buka Sitik Joss by Juwita Bahar; Song Kereta Malam by Elvi Sukaesih; Song Simalakama by Yopie Latul; Song Oplosan by Nurbayan
Pokoke Joget Dance	Song Pokoke Joget by Nurbayan
Naik Delman Dance	Song Naik Delman
Aweu Dance	Song Joget Aweu by Sarayuda
Ngamen 5 Dance	Song Ngamen 5 by Eny Sagita
Senggol Dance	Song Goyang Senggol by Camelia Malik
Goyang Morena	Song Goyang Morena by Syahrini

=== Song ===
Song	President
Oplosan (Batak Version)	Judika
Oplosan (Mandarin Version)	Delon
Oplosan (Minang Version)	Siti Liza
