= Extravaganza (TV series) =

- Genre: Comedy
- Starring: Tora Sudiro; Indra Birowo; Virnie Ismail; Rony Dozer; Tike Priatnakusumah; Ronal Surapradja; Aming; Sogi Indra Dhuaja; Cathy Sharon; Luna Maya; Edric Tjandra; Ence Bagus; TJ; Ananda Omesh; Gilang Dirgahari
- Country of origin: Indonesia
- Original language: Indonesian

Production
- Production location: Trans TV Studio
- Camera setup: Multi-camera
- Running time: 120 minutes

Original release
- Network: Trans TV
- Release: May 30, 2004 – November 28, 2009

Extravaganza is a two-hour comedy variety show taped in Jakarta, Indonesia, which has been broadcast by Trans TV on Saturday and Monday night since its debut on May 30, 2004, until November 28, 2009. At the time, it was the most popular comedy variety show in Indonesia.

== Cast ==
- Tora Sudiro
- Indra Birowo
- Rony Dozer Karli
- Virnie Ismail
- Ronal Surapradja
- Tike Priatnakusumah
- Aming
- Tinka Dasia*
- Mieke Amalia*
- Sogi Indra Dhuaja
- Gilang Dirgahari
- And other new characters: Edric Tjandra, Lia Ananta*, Ence Bagus, and Farid Shigeta*.

It also stars four finalists of Kampus Extravaganza, a show to find new characters ('extras') for Extravaganza. They are T.J., Sentot* now known as (Papham Ashari), Ananda Omesh and Ammho*. There are also newer members, like Cathy Sharon and Luna Maya

Notes: *(*)No longer starred in Extravaganza

== Show ==
Every episode of Extravaganza had guests, such as Cinta Laura, Ungu, etc.

The show became successful due to its creativity and originality, a new, fresh kind of comedy show in Indonesia. This is however, debatable since the format of the show appeared to be strongly based on foreign comedy shows, most prominently the American Saturday Night Live (SNL). Most of the comedic scenario the show used was based (sometimes even almost identical, word for word) on jokes circulating on the Internet and common Indonesian jokes.

== Segment in Extravaganza ==
Some segment on Extravaganza such as:

- Sketsa Komedi (Comedy Sketch) - Comedy story like the real-life story. Usually based on true life-story, anime, manga, Western cartoon, Indonesia fighting, folktale, or even pre-historic era.
- Gerimis - Parody of Trans TV program Ceriwis with the tagline "Yoo...Miss..."
- Legenda Extravaganza (Extravaganza Legend)
- Bincang-bincang Extravaganza (Extravaganza Talk) - Talk show segment with Tike Priyatnakusumah.
- Extranews - News segment presented by Edric Tjandra, Indra Birowo or Shogi. Edric always presented the news with perfunctory Chinese language.
- Sinden Gosip - Infotainment segment presented by Tike and TJ which brought with Sundanese song.
- Berpacu dengan Muladi - Music quiz parodied from TVRI program Berpacu Dalam Melodi.
- Teka-Teki Selebritis (Celebrity Crosswords)
- Makelar (Lima Kelip Terpopular) - Music segment which presented some Indonesian music video clip that had been parodied by the Extravaganza cast.
- Termelet-melet - Like Gerimis, but the real-show that been parodied is the Trans TV program Termehek-Mehek.
- Mauneh (Manusia Unik dan Aneh) - A segment that introduced people with some unique and strange look.
- Bedak (Berdua Dalam Kamar)

== Trivia ==
- Aming, Indra Birowo, and Tora Sudiro appears at Indonesian movie, "Janji Joni".
- Indra Birowo and Ence Bagus starred in the movie "Setannya Kok Beneran".
