= Kun Yee =

Thai actor (born 1976)

Kun Yee alias Chalermphol Waehama (born December 11, 1976), also known as Daddy, is a Thai singer, police officer, producer and television personality active in Indonesia. He is also a dangdut star, referred to in the media as the " Prince of Thailand Dangdut", he has appeared in more than 40 films, and earned numerous accolades, and has a significant following in Indonesia and South East Asia.

Yee began his career with appearances in several television shows in the early 1990s. He made his dangdut debut in 1996 with the single "Pangeran Dangdut" a cover song from a song that was a hit in 1995 by the real pangeran dangdut or Prince of dangdut, Abiem Ngesti from Indonesia.

Many of Yee's songs and films display themes of Thai national identity and connections with diversity, or gender, racial, social and religious differences and grievances. Yee is commander of the Unit in Special Branch division in the Royal Thai Force with the rank of Captain. He is also the original judge of D'academy Asia 2.

He regularly features in listings of the most influential people in Thai people from Chinese background, of which his ancestor came as a contract worker from the China Empire in the 1900s. In 2008, Tabloid Bintang named him one of the most powerful people in Thailand.
