= Trans Media =

Indonesian media company

PT Trans Media Corpora

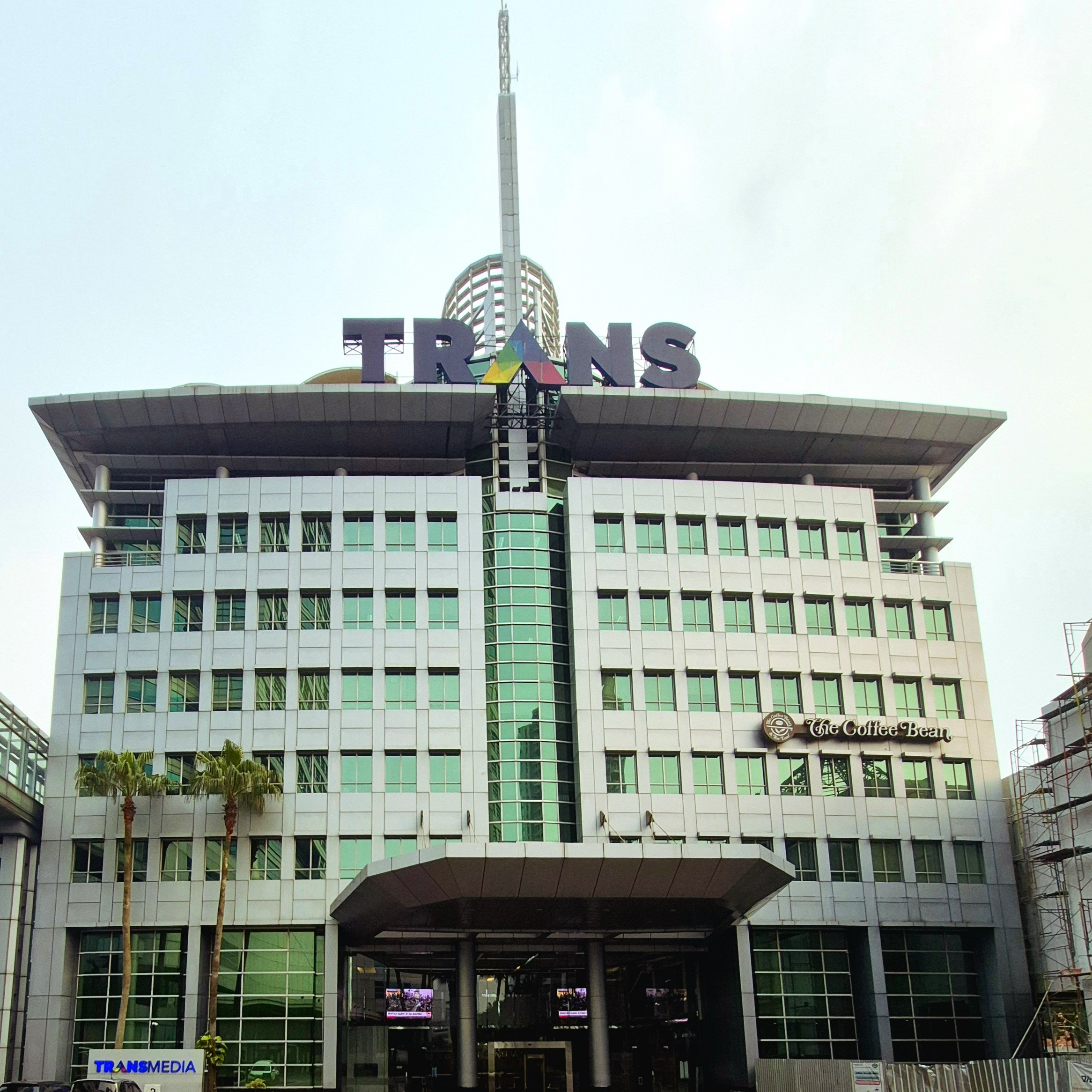
- Trans Media Building in Mampang Prapatan, Jakarta
- Type: Subsidiary
- Industry: Media
- Founded: 15 December 2013; 12 years ago
- Headquarters: Trans Media Building; Jl. Kapten Pierre Tendean No. 12-14A, Mampang Prapatan, South Jakarta, Indonesia
- Key people: Chairul Tanjung
- Services: Television broadcasting; Digital media; Pay television
- Owner: CT Corp
- Parent: Trans Corp

PT Trans Media Corpora is an Indonesian media corporation that is a subsidiary of Trans Corp, a part of CT Corp, owned by Chairul Tanjung. Trans Media was initially founded as a subsidiary of Trans Corp, a liaison between the television network Trans TV and a network that had just taken over 55% ownership stake by CT Corp of Kompas Gramedia, Trans7 (formerly TV7).

== Business units ==
- PT Televisi Transformasi Indonesia (Trans TV)
- PT Duta Visual Nusantara Tivi Tujuh (Trans7)
- PT Trans News Corpora (CNN Indonesia), licensed from Skydance Corporation
- PT Trans Berita Bisnis (CNBC Indonesia), licensed from Versant
- PT Trans Digital Media (detik Network)
  - PT Agranet Multicitra Siberkom (detikcom)
  - HaiBunda.com
  - Insertlive.com
  - CNNIndonesia.com
  - CNBCIndonesia.com
  - PT Trans Media Sosial (TMS)
- PT Transinema Pictures
- PT SM Entertainment Indonesia
- PT Indonusa Telemedia (Transvision)
  - Transvision Channels
    - Golf Channel Indonesia
    - Nusantara
    - T-Music
    - Dunia Anak
    - Lingua Channel
    - Bioskop Indonesia
    - Jendela
    - Insert
    - SERU! Channel
    - Dunia Lain
    - Eat & Go
    - Khazanah
    - Historical Sports
- PT Trans Rekan Media
- PT Trans Entertainment
- PT Trans Event Produksi (Trans Event)

== Branch offices ==
=== Surabaya ===
On December 19, 2011, Vice Governor of East Java Saifullah Yusuf inaugurated Trans Corp's office at Jalan Jimerto No 17 A, Surabaya. This place becomes representative office for Trans TV, Trans7 and Detik.com in East Java.

=== Bandung ===
On February 1, 2012, Bandung Mayor Dada Rosada inaugurated Trans Corp's office at Jalan Lombok No 33, Bandung. This office became the representative place for Trans TV, Trans7 and DetikCom's Bandung bureau.
