= MEASAT-3b =

Malaysian communications satellite

- Mission type: Communication
- Operator: MEASAT Satellite Systems
- COSPAR ID: 2014-054B
- SATCAT no.: 40147
- Mission duration: Planned: 15 years, elapsed: 11 years, 3 months and 19 days

Spacecraft properties
- Bus: Eurostar E3000
- Manufacturer: Astrium (now Airbus Defence and Space)
- Launch mass: 5,897 kilograms (13,001 lb)
- Power: 16,000 watts

Start of mission
- Launch date: 11 September 2014, 22:05 UTC
- Rocket: Ariane 5 ECA VA218
- Launch site: Kourou ELA-3
- Contractor: Arianespace

Orbital parameters
- Reference system: Geocentric
- Regime: Geostationary
- Longitude: 91.5°East
- Slot: MEASAT 91.5°E
- Perigee altitude: 35,789.7 kilometres (22,238.7 mi)
- Apogee altitude: 35,798.4 kilometres (22,244.1 mi)
- Inclination: 0.0 degrees
- Period: 1436.1 minutes
- Epoch: 3 October 2017, 17:03:34 UTC

Transponders
- Band: 48 Ku band
- Bandwidth: 36 megahertz
- Coverage area: Malaysia, Indonesia, South Asia and Australia
- TWTA power: 130 watts
- EIRP: 61 decibel-watts (Malaysia Beam), 56 decibel-watts (Indonesia Beam), 55.8 decibel-watts (South Asia Beam), 54.7 decibel-watts (Australia Beam)

MEASAT-3b is a communications satellite which MEASAT Satellite Systems operates in geosynchronous orbit at 91.5 degrees east longitude, co-located with MEASAT-3 and MEASAT-3a, with orbital period of 1436.1 minutes and orbital speed of ~3.08 km/s (~1.914 mi/s). It was built by Astrium (now Airbus Defence and Space), based on the Eurostar spacecraft platform, with an investment of approximately MYR1.25bn ($370m), and the 5th MEASAT satellite in orbit. Its weigh 5,897 kilograms at liftoff and is 6.6 by 2.8 by 2.3 meters in dimensions in its stowed config and spanned across 39.4m in orbit. It is three-axis stabilized and has 48 Ku band transponder, more than double the current Ku-band capacity operated by MEASAT, which are used for the expansion of video and data services and enhances support to Asia's premium direct-to-home (DTH) and video distribution neighbourhood across Malaysia, South Asia (India), Indonesia and Australia, serving more than 18 million households. It has been designed to support a fourth market. Australian satellite operator NewSat Ltd. (now part of SpeedCast Australia Pty Limited) announced in February 2012, that an undisclosed number of Ku-band transponders will be leases and marketed as Jabiru 2. Its mission duration lasted more than 15 years. MEASAT-3b technical frequency EIRP test are available in LyngSat website.

== Launch ==
It was launched on 12 September 2014, 06:05 MYT from Centre Spatial Guyanais (Guiana Space Center) at Kourou in French Guiana at ELA-3 launch site, aboard the Ariane 5 ECA rocket. The launch was announced in national news article and television few hours later after successful launch. It reached orbital epoch on 3 October 2017, 17:03:34 UTC.
