= Indonesia Morning Show =

- Created by: Adrian Maulana; Maggie Fachrisky
- Presented by: Shahnaz Soehartono; Marissa Anita; Ananda Omesh Caroline Soerachmat Ben Kasyafani Sheila Purnama
- Country of origin: Indonesia
- Original language: Indonesian

Production
- Production location: Jakarta
- Running time: 90 minutes
- Production company: NET. News

Original release
- Network: NET.
- Release: May 18, 2013 – June 7, 2019

Related
- Jejak Peristiwa (2021-present)

Indonesia Morning Show was an Indonesian breakfast television on NET. featuring a variety of recent updates, such as hard news, light news, & entertainment news. It broadcasts for 1,5 hours, from 06.00-07.30 WIB.

== Segments ==
Indonesia Morning Show consists of 12 segments and 8 sub-segments:

- National News
  - Politics
  - Law and Criminal
  - Business and Finance
  - Social and Economy
  - Culture
  - Education
- Infotainment (taken from NET. program Entertainment News)
- Sports
- Newspaper review
- Traffic Report
- Weather Report
- Music
- Culinary with Karen Carlotta
- Health
- Interactive dialogue
- Today's History
