= Kiki Fatmala =

Indonesian actress (1967 - 2023)

- Born: August 14, 1967; Jakarta, Indonesia
- Died: December 1, 2023 (aged 56); Jakarta, Indonesia
- Resting place: San Diego Hills
- Occupation: Celebrity
- Years active: 1988 - 2023
- Spouse(s): Christopher Herboldt (2020-2023); Christian Froeschel (2004 - 2006); Antonius Salomata (1987 - 1988)

Kiki Fatmala (14 August 1967 - 1 December 2023) was an Indonesian actress. She became popular after starring as Mariam in the Indosiar's soap opera Mariam Si Manis Jembatan Ancol 2 in 1995.

== Personal life ==
Kiki Fatmala was married to Christian Froeschl and they subsequently divorced. In 2019, she decided to change her faith to become a Christian.

Kiki Fatmala was diagnosed with stage IV (4) lung cancer in 2021. She died due to complications of the disease on 1 December 2023, at the age of 56.

== Filmography ==
=== Film ===
Year	Title	Role	Notes
1988	Permainan Dibalik Tirai		
1988	Pengakuan		
1988	Malu-Malu Mau		
1988	Bayar Tapi Nyicil		Supporting role
1988	Akibat Terlalu Genit		
1989	Kisah Cinta Nyi Blorong	Warsih	Supporting role
1989	Genta Pertarungan	Dian Sari	Lead role
1989	Disana Mau Disini Mau	Mia	Lead role
1989	Pembalasan Setan Karan Bolong		
1989	Kemesraan		Supporting role
1989	Badai Jalanan	Kiki	Lead role
1989	Pengantin Rimba Hitam	Roan	Lead role
1990	Ikut-Ikutan	Ira	Lead role
1990	Gampang-Gampang Susah		Supporting role
1990	Antri Dong		Supporting role
1990	Angkara Membara	Eva	Supporting role
1990	Ajian Pamungkas		Supporting role
1990	Nyi Lamped (Melati Karang Hawu)	Nuning	Lead role
1990	Nona Manis		
1991	Bisa Naik Bisa Turun		Supporting role
1991	Akal-Akalan	Ira	Lead role
1992	Salah Pencet	Eva	Lead role
1992	Masuk Kena Keluar Kena	Wenny	Supporting role
1993	Misteri Permainan Terlarang	Gizma	Lead role
1993	Misteri Dimalam Pengantin	Kinanti	Lead role
1993	Gairah Yang Nakal	Lisa	Lead role
1993	Gadis Malam	Prita	Lead role
1993	Bagi-Bagi Dong	Kristine	Supporting role
1994	Kabut Asmara	Cynthia	Lead role
1994	Kenikmatan Tabu	Rita	Lead role
1994	Dibalik Cinta Eva	Eva	Lead role
1995	Gairah Terlarang	Merry	Lead role
2008	Hantu Jembatan Ancol	Mariam	Special appearances
2008	Mas Suka, Masukin Aja Besar-Kecil It's Okay!	Miss Resita	Supporting role
2009	Pijat Atas Tekan Bawah	Titi	Supporting role
2012	Enak Sama Enak	Ros	Supporting role
2014	Comic 8	Hot Mama	Supporting role
2014	Kesurupan Setan	Nining	Lead role

=== Television ===
Year	Title	Role	Notes	Network
1993	Mody Juragan Kost	Rina	Lead role	RCTI
1993 - 1995	Ada-Ada Saja		Lead role	RCTI
1995	Mariam Si Manis Jembatan Ancol 2	Mariam	Lead role	Indosiar
1997	Misteri Dalam Kubur			RCTI
2005 - 2006	Hidayah	Various role	3 episodes: "Wanita Cantik Mati Dengan Dada Membusuk" as Rosmi; "Sinden Ngetop Meninggal Dengan Alis Memanjang" as Laksmi; "Istri Beri Hadiah Ribuan Lalat Pada Suaminya" as Titin	Trans TV
2005	Kusebut Nama-Mu			RCTI
2005	Astaghfirullah			SCTV
2005 - 2006	Iman			SCTV
2006 - 2007	Hikayah			Trans TV
2007	Dongeng	Various role	2 episodes: "Rapunzel" as Nyi Sari; "Si Merah & Si Putih" as Rika	Trans TV
2007	Rahasia Ilahi			TPI
2007	Pintu Hidayah			RCTI
2007 - 2010	Suami-Suami Taku Istri			Trans TV
2008 - 2009	Kasih dan Amara			Indosiar
2014	Oh Ternyata		Episode: "Gosip Tukang Jamu"	Trans TV

=== Television film ===
Year	Title	Role	Notes
2003	Satu Lelaki dan Tiga Hantu Cantik		Lead role
