= Furla =

Italian fashion company

- Industry: Fashion
- Founded: 1927; 99 years ago
- Founder: Aldo Furlanetto
- Headquarters: Bologna, Italy
- Number of locations: 457 stores
- Key people: Giovanna Furlanetto, President of Fondazione Furla; Eraldo Poletto, CEO
- Products: Handbags; Accessories; Small leather goods
- Website: www.furla.com

Furla is an Italian luxury brand that has been in the leather goods industry since 1927. The company produces luxury handbags and accessories.

== History ==
Furla was founded in Bologna (Emilia-Romagna), Italy in 1927 by Aldo Furlanetto, selling ladies' accessories wholesale.

In 1955, the first Furla store was opened in Bologna. By the 1970s, Aldo Furlanetto children, Carlo, Paolo, and Giovanna Furlanetto assisted with the business.

During the same decade, Furla released the first collection of bags. In the early 1990s, Furla started to open stores and branches around the world.

In 2007, Furla celebrated its 80th anniversary with the introduction of the "Furla Talent Hub Project".

In 2008, Giovanna Furlanetto established Fondazione Furla in order to support emerging talents.

In 2012, Furla opened its first flagship store in Bangkok, creating a new store concept. By 2013, Furla started to manage its distribution in Hong Kong, Macau, and China, and recorded growth in Asia.

In 2015, Furla opened Palazzo Furla in Milan, Italy's fashion capital. In 2018, Furla acquired the manufacturing plant Effeuno Srl in Tuscany. In the same year, Furla's sales more than doubled to 513 million euros. The company then finalized the acquisition of the retail distribution network in China.

In 2019, the company declared that it would only use faux fur in its collections.

In 2020, Furla USA filed for Chapter 11 bankruptcy protection, planning to exit leases and shed debt. In 2023, the Canadian subsidiary filed for bankruptcy in Ontario.

== Distribution ==
Furla operates an omnichannel structure, integrating different physical and digital touchpoints. The brand's collections are present in 850 points of sale around the world, including multi-brand boutiques and department stores. In addition, Furla operates a retail network covering 50 countries with a total of 457 points of sale, including 281 direct stores, 141 franchised shops, and 35 units in airports and railway stations.

== Furla Progetto Italia ==
In the spring of 2021, Furla inaugurated Furla Progetto Italia, the new 43,000 square metre complex located in Tavarnelle Val di Pesa. The new hub also houses the "Furla Academy", a training program launched in 2018 in partnership with ITS Mita, which aims to offer young talented artisans access to academic studies and technical and practical courses.

In February 2023, Furla announced a spring and summer line, "Italy by Furla". The announcement came via a marketing campaign starring Italian DJ and producer Anfisa Letyago.

== Gallery ==
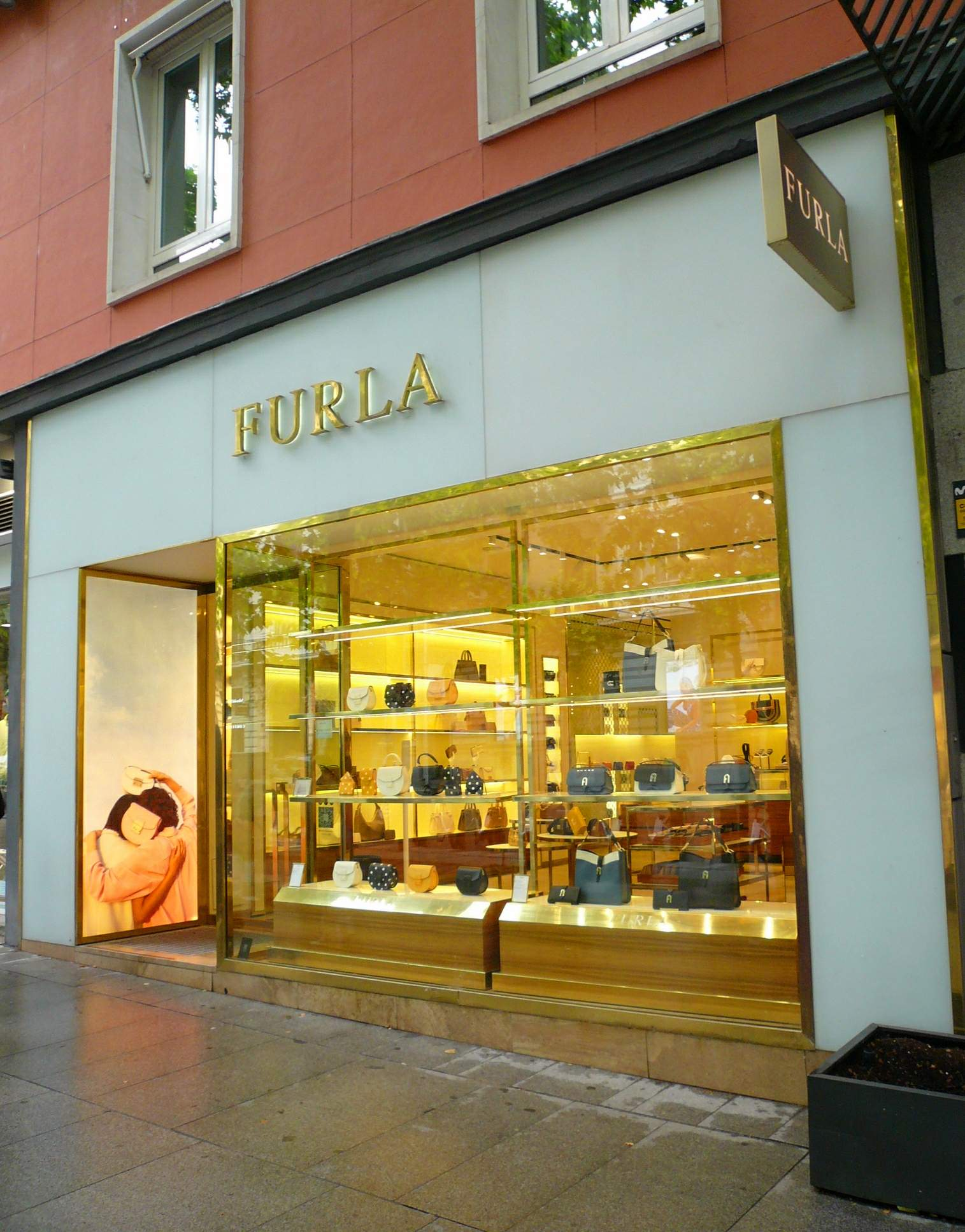
Furla store in Madrid

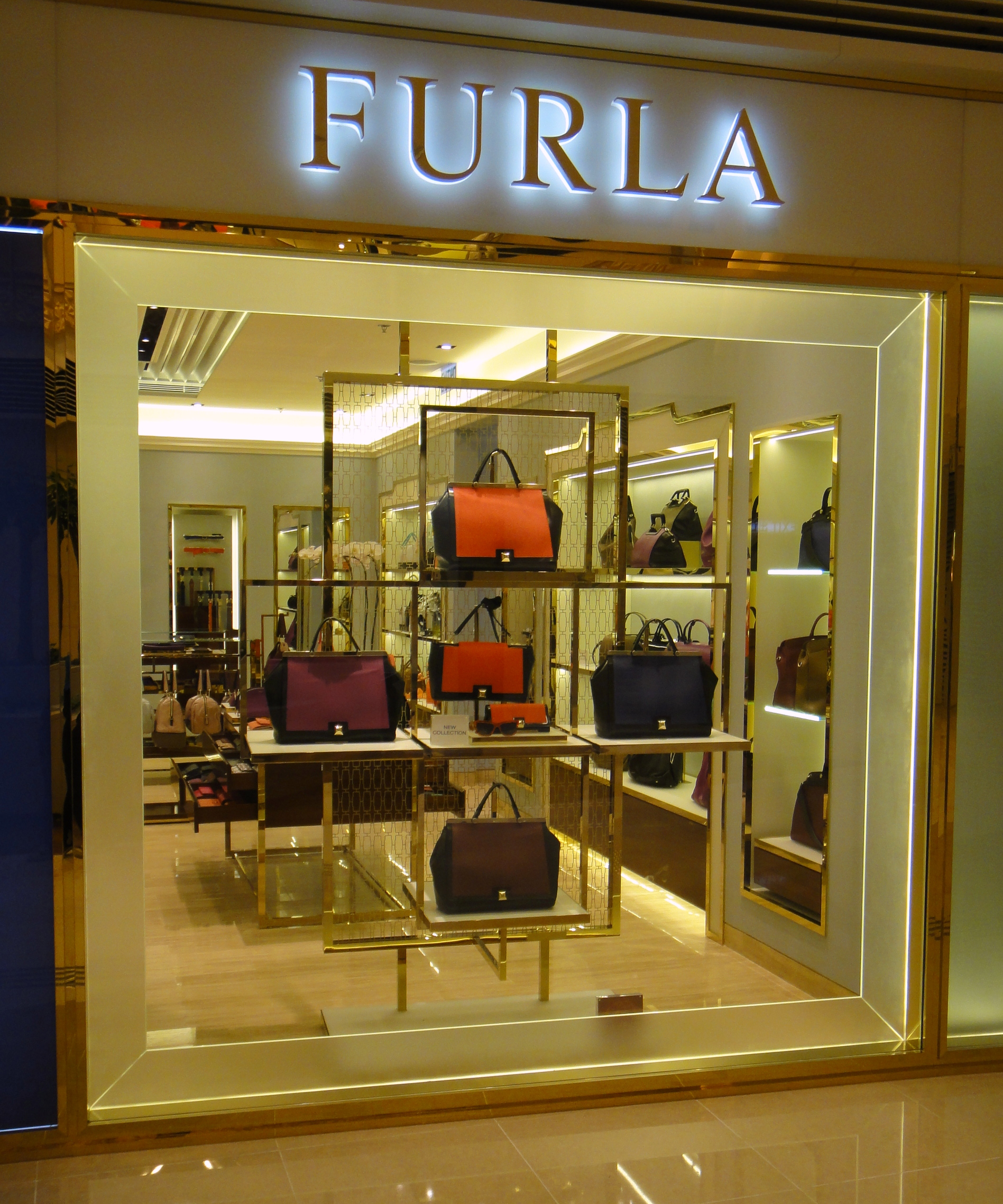
Furla store inside a Hong Kong mall

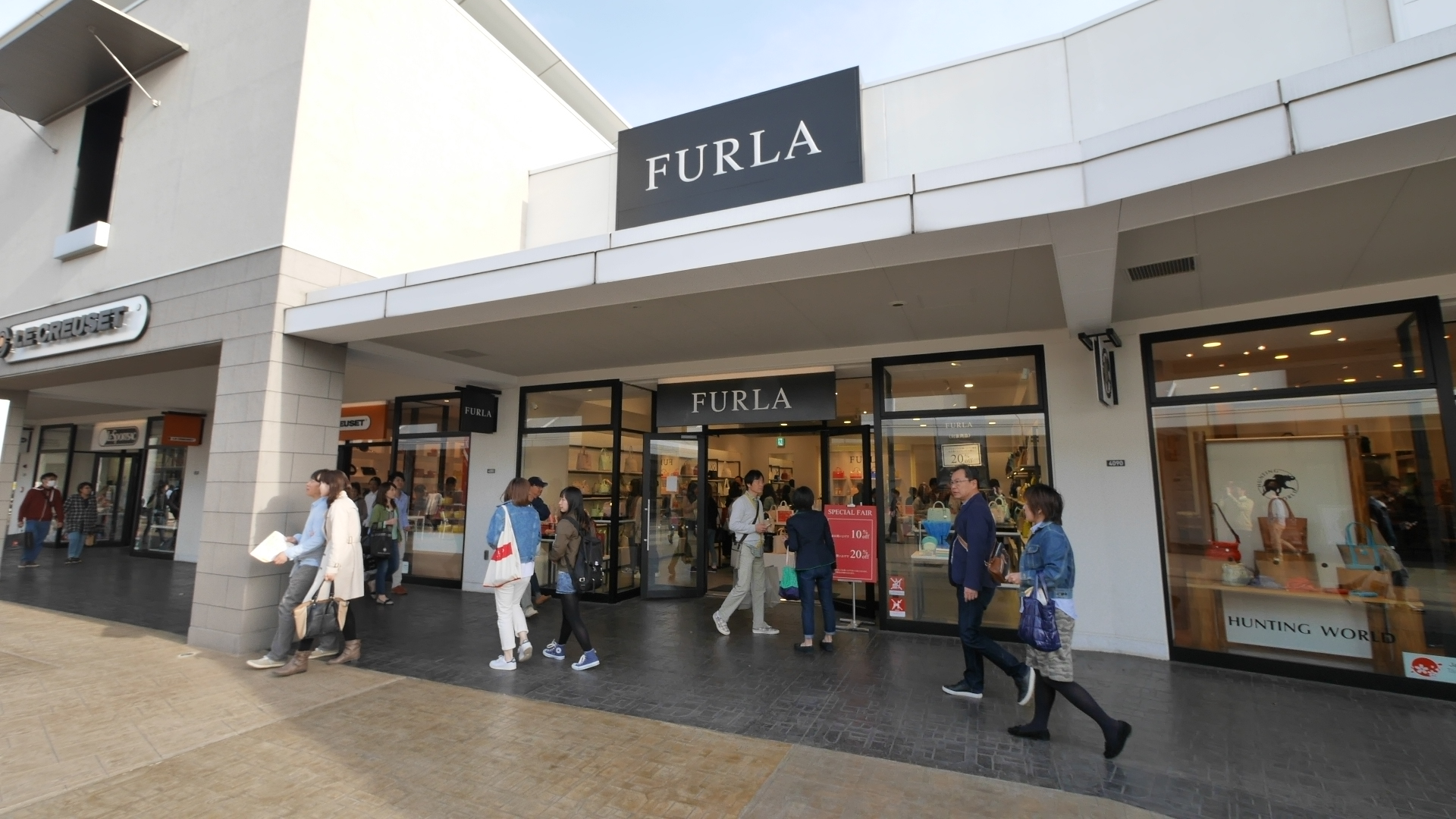
Furla store in Japan
