= CNBC Indonesia =

Indonesian television business news network

- Logo used since 10 February 2026
- Country: Indonesia
- Broadcast area: Nationwide
- Network: CNBC
- Headquarters: Jakarta

Programming
- Language: Indonesian
- Picture format: 1080i HDTV 16:9

Ownership
- Owner: PT Trans Berita Bisnis, with license from Versant
- Parent: Trans Media
- Sister channels: List: CNBC; CNBC World; CNBC Asia; Nikkei CNBC; CNBC Arabiya; CNBC Awaaz; CNBC-TV18; CNBC Africa; Class CNBC; CNBC Europe; CNBC Latin America; JKN-CNBC; Trans TV; Trans7; CNN Indonesia

History
- Launched: 10 October 2018; 8 years ago

Links
- Website: cnbcindonesia.com

Availability

Terrestrial
- Digital terrestrial television: Check local frequencies (in Indonesian language)

Streaming media
- Official: Watch live
- IndiHome TV: Watch live (IndiHome customers only)

CNBC Indonesia is an Indonesian television network owned by Trans Media in collaboration with Versant under the CNBC license. Launched on 10 October 2018, coinciding with Trans 7's 20th anniversary as a corporate. it is the second business-oriented news channel in Indonesia after IDX Channel.

== History ==
The logo, which was based on the 1996 CNBC logo, itself derived from the 1986 NBC logo, used from 2018 to 2024, as the on-air logo. It is still used on its official website and advertisement of their TV programs, as well as its corporate logo, until 2 December 2024.

Alternate logo, with "INDONESIA" wordmark written in different variant of NBC Tinker Pro font. This variant of 2024 logo is being from 2 December 2024 until 10 February 2026 for opening bumpers and advertisement of their TV programs.

Businessman Chairul Tanjung announced the birth of a strategic partnership between Trans Media and then-owner of the CNBC trademark, NBCUniversal of Comcast to launch of the latter branded channel in Indonesia. CNBC Indonesia was soft-launched as an online business news portal in the Indonesian language on 8 February 2018 and was officially launched as a business news channel on 10 October 2018 coinciding with Trans 7's 20th anniversary as a corporate.

In early February 2020, the channel launched its own HD feed on the Telkom 4 Merah Putih satellite.

== List of programmes ==
- Managing Asia (from CNBC Asia)
- Profit
- Number's Bite
- Iconomics
- CNBC Indonesia Exclusive
- News Flash
- Breaking News
- Squawk Box Indonesia
- Power Lunch Indonesia
- Closing Bell Indonesia
- Evening Up
- INVESTime
- Economics Update
- The Journey
- Talk to Titans
- Prime Words
- Trend Setter
- Around The World
- Cuap Cuap Cuan
- Special Dialogue
- Nation Hub
- Editor's View
- Trans Media's Anniversary (annual program)
- CNBC Indonesia's Anniversary (annual program)
- CNBC Indonesia Bright Awards (annual program)
- Economic Outlook (annual program)
