= Trans7 =

Indonesian private television network

- Logo since 15 December 2013, with the current "Diamond A" logo that has been used since of that date 2011
- Type: Television broadcaster
- Country: Indonesia
- Broadcast area: Nationwide
- Headquarters: Trans Media Building, Jl. Kapten Pierre Tendean No. 12-14A, Mampang Prapatan, South Jakarta, Indonesia

Programming
- Language: Indonesian
- Picture format: 1080i HDTV (downscaled to 16:9 576i for the SDTV feed)

Ownership
- Owner: Kompas Gramedia (2000–2006); Trans Media (2006–present)
- Key people: Atiek Nur Wahyuni (President Director; Sales and Marketing Director)
- Sister channels: Trans TV; CNN Indonesia; CNBC Indonesia

History
- Launched: 22 March 2000; 26 years ago (as TV7); 4 August 2001 (Trial broadcast); 25 November 2001; 24 years ago (Official broadcast); 15 December 2006 (as Trans7)
- Founder: Sukoyo
- Former names: DVN TV (1999–2000); TV7 (2000–2006)

Links
- Website: www.trans7.co.id

Availability

Terrestrial
- Digital Greater Jakarta: 40 (UHF); Channel 21
- Digital Regional branches: Check local frequencies (in Indonesian language)

Streaming media
- IndiHome TV: Watch live (IndiHome customers only)
- Vidio: Watch live
- Vision+: Watch live (Subscription required, Indonesia only)
- Official: Watch live
- MIVO: Watch live

PT Duta Visual Nusantara Tivi Tujuh (previously PT Duta Visual Nusantara), commonly operating and known as Trans7 or TRANS7 in all caps (stylized TRɅNS|7, pronounced Trans Tujuh in Indonesian, formerly known as TV7) is an Indonesian free-to-air private television network owned by Trans Media, a part of Trans Corp, which in turn is a subsidiary of CT Corp. The channel was officially launched as TV7 on 25 November 2001 at 5:00 PM local time. The final transmission and broadcast aired on 15 December 2006 at 19:00 WIB. The network was then sold by Kompas Gramedia to Trans Media and changed the name from TV7 to Trans7.

== History ==
=== Establishment and early broadcast ===
The logo of TV7, used from 25 November 2001 until 15 December 2006

Trans7 was established as TV7 based on issuance of a permit by Department of Trade and Industry in Central Jakarta (No. 809/BH.09.05/III/2000). 80% of its share is largely owned by Kompas Gramedia Group. It was initially named Duta Visual Nusantara TV (DVN TV), where the permission was issued on 25 October 1999, based on the Regulation of the Minister of Information (Peraturan Menteri Penerangan, Permenpen) No.797/MP/1999. The network was owned by H. Sukoyo, a shrimp pond entrepreneur from East Java, and three other parties which were his Starpage pager business partner. He decided to sell his TV network's establishment permission to Kompas Gramedia. The share purchase of DVN TV was considered as the realization of Kompas Gramedia's intend to be involved in the television industry.

In October 2001, TV7 was planned to start its broadcast, with full broadcast beginning in March 2002. However, on 25 November 2001, TV7 was launched in State Gazette No. 8687 as PT Duta Visual Nusantara Tivi Tujuh (TV7). At the time, the broadcast only covers Greater Jakarta area, with 49 UHF channel, with 5-hour broadcasting time from 17:00-22:00 WIB. The logo itself is the letters "JO", which stands for Jakob Oetama (1931–2020), the co-founder of Kompas Gramedia Group. The logo is also loosely based on the Circle 7 logo that is used by the American broadcast network ABC for its several owned-and-operated and affiliated stations. On 7 April 2002, TV7 was officially on-air, with the broadcasting time extended into 22 hours (04:30-02:30 WIB) in 2003. The broadcast coverage was later extended to Surakarta and Surabaya. TV7 has 300 employees as of 2003. The early programming itself were entertainment-based but inclined with local materials and with an explorative theme, such as Jejak Petualang which still broadcasts today. Nevertheless, TV7's program rating was considered not too well, which led to a report that the network was offered to be bought by Surya Citra Media (SCM)—parent company of SCTV—in July 2003 on the grounds of financial problems, but eventually never happened.

=== Iraq invasion coverage ===
In the first quarter of 2003, TV7 aired daily relays of Al Jazeera during the U.S. invasion of Iraq through a news program titled Invasi ke Irak (Invasion to Iraq). In response, rival broadcaster ANTV started relaying Al Arabiya's coverage of the invasion.

=== Re-launch as Trans7 ===
The first logo of Trans7, used from 15 December 2006 to 2013. After that, the logo was revised into the current one which is shown in the infobox.

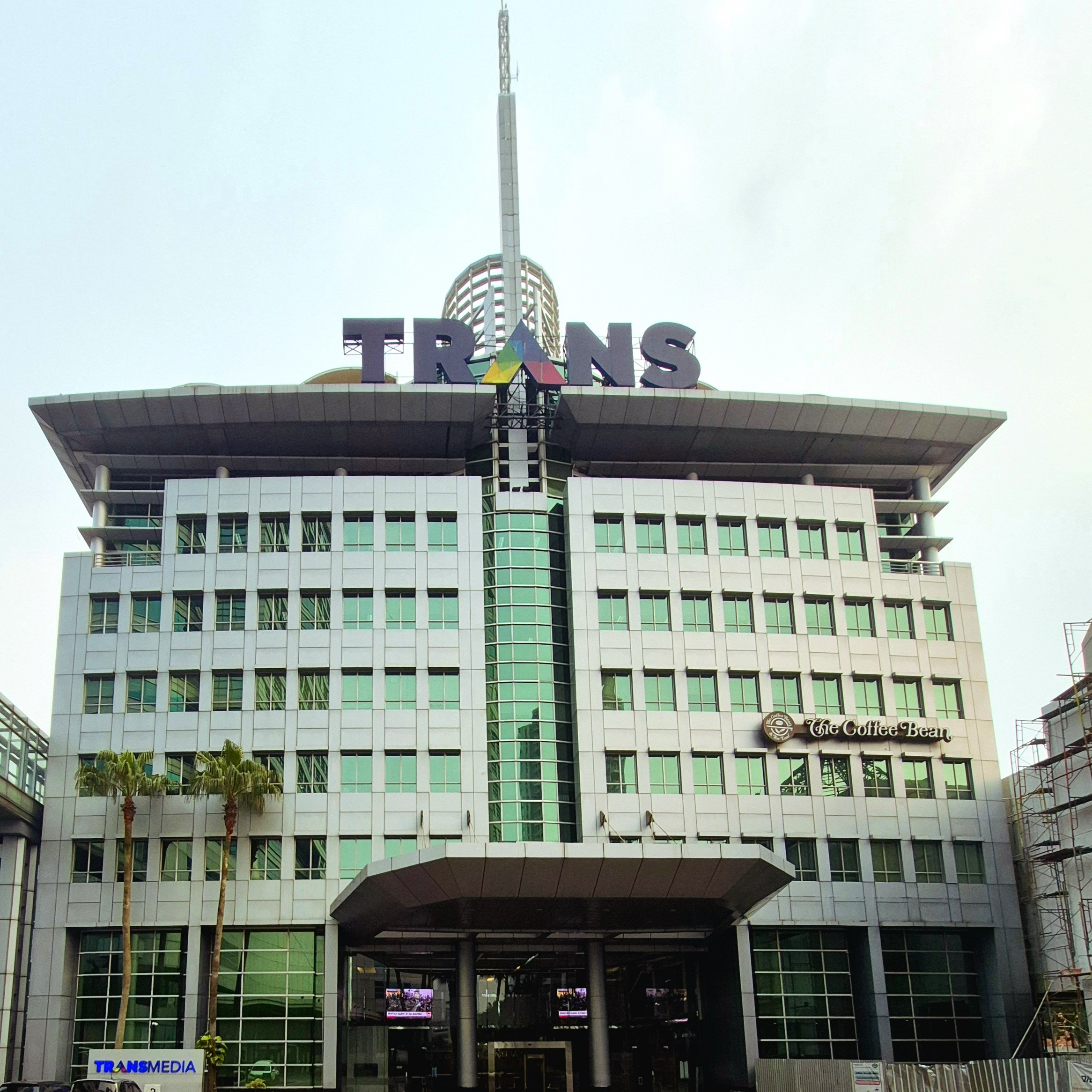
The Trans Media Building in Jakarta

On 4 August 2006, CT Corp (then Para Group) via Trans Corp authorized to buy a 55% stake in PT Duta Visual Nusantara Tivi Tujuh (as it noted in the book titled Chairul Tanjung si Anak Singkong; lit.: Chairul Tanjung the Cassava Boy). In conjunction with Trans TV's 5th anniversary on 15 December 2006 at 19:00 local time, the channel was rebranded as Trans7, making it the second CT Corp owned television network. With the buyout and relaunch, the network moved its office to Trans TV's building.

For the first time, Trans7 became the official broadcaster of the 2018 FIFA World Cup along with the sister channel Trans TV, also with Telkom Indonesia, K-Vision and MNC Vision. Trans7 had broadcast 8 group-stage matches as well as shared broadcasting of quarterfinal, semifinal, 3rd place playoff, and final matches from Trans TV, also from UseeTV (now IndiHome TV), K-Vision, and MNC Sports.

Since 2 November 2022, Trans7 was terminated and stopped Analog transmission operation from Jakarta and its surrounding areas and switched over to digital transmission by Trans TV Jakarta operation during Modi countdown to midnight special coverage. In December 2022–July 2023, Trans7 terminated all Analog transmission by a mandate from the Ministry of Communications and Informatics about ASO delay since 2022.

== Controversy ==
In October 2025, a broadcast of the channel's Xpose Uncensored program which documented pesantren and accused the Islamic boarding schools of feudal and slavery-like practices, was the source of public controversy, being criticized by Islamic organizations and politicians and with the hashtag "#BoycottTrans7" trending on X (Twitter).

== Programming ==
=== Sports programming ===
Trans7 has broadcast the Premier League from 2002–07, and also broadcast the AFF Championship for 2004 and 2007 editions. Trans7 broadcast Serie A from 2007–09 and returned in 2016–17 season, LaLiga in 2012–13 season as well as International Champions Cup in 2017. In 2018, Trans7 broadcast the 2018 FIFA World Cup alongside sister channel Trans TV, also with IndiHome/UseeTV, K-Vision and MNC Sports. Since 2023, Trans7 broadcast the pre-season tournament, Soccer Champions Tour.

Trans7 is the licensed broadcaster for MotoGP in Indonesia for more than 20 years since 2002 and will continue until 2026 after obtaining a broadcast rights extension. Starting from the 2022 season and the opening of Mandalika International Street Circuit, Trans7 will also broadcast the Superbike World Championship.

Trans7 also hosts the Indonesia Open Badminton Championships coverage since 2008 until 2019 (originally until 2020, but the event cancelled due to COVID-19 pandemic), after broadcasting the Thomas and Uber Cups for 2008 (simulcast with Trans TV) and 2010 seasons.

== Directors and commissioners ==
=== List of chief executive officers ===
No.	Name	Early positions	End of positions
1	August Parengkuan	2001	2003
2	Lanny Rahardja	2003	2006
3	Wishnutama	2006	2008
4	Atiek Nurwahyuni	2008	present

=== Current Directors and Commissioners ===
Name	Position
Atiek Nurwahyuni	Chief Executive Officer
Ch. Suswati Handayani	Chief Financial and Resources
Andi Chairil Edward	Chief Production
Chairul Tanjung	President Commissioner
Ishadi Soetopo Kartosapoetro	Commissioner
Elizabeth Sindoro	Commissioner
Lina Tjokrosaputro	Commissioner

== Presenters ==
=== Former ===
- Isyana Bagoes Oka
- Putri Raemawasti
- Annisa Pohan
- Kamidia Radisti

== See also ==
- List of television stations in Indonesia
- Trans TV
- Television in Indonesia
