= Trans TV =

Indonesian free-to-air television broadcaster

- Logo since 2013, with the current "Diamond A" logo that has been used since 2011
- Type: Television broadcaster
- Country: Indonesia
- Broadcast area: Nationwide
- Headquarters: Trans Media Building, Jl. Kapten Pierre Tendean No. 12-14A, Mampang Prapatan, South Jakarta, Indonesia

Programming
- Languages: Indonesian (main); English (secondary)
- Picture format: 1080i HDTV (downscaled to 16:9 576i for the SDTV feed)

Ownership
- Owner: Trans Media
- Key people: Atiek Nur Wahyuni (President Director; Sales and Marketing Director)
- Sister channels: Trans7; CNN Indonesia; CNBC Indonesia

History
- Founded: 23 December 1999; 26 years ago
- Launched: 25 October 2001; 24 years ago (trial broadcast); 15 December 2001; 24 years ago (official broadcast)
- Founder: Chairul Tanjung; Ishadi S.K.

Links
- Website: www.transtv.co.id

Availability

Terrestrial
- Digital terrestrial television Greater Jakarta: 40 (UHF); Channel 20
- Digital terrestrial television: Check local frequencies (in Indonesian language)

Streaming media
- Official: Watch live
- IndiHome TV: Watch live (IndiHome customers only)
- Vidio: Watch live
- Vision+: Watch live (Subscription required, Indonesia only)
- MIVO: Watch live

PT Televisi Transformasi Indonesia, commonly known as Trans TV, is an Indonesian free-to-air television broadcaster based in South Jakarta. Launched on 15 December 2001, it is owned by Chairul Tanjung. Programming consists of newscasts, movies, drama series, variety shows, quiz shows, and children's television series. Trans TV was Indonesia's main broadcaster of the 2018 FIFA World Cup, showing most group matches and all of the final matches, which led to the channel topping Indonesian television ratings as of 19 June 2018.

== History ==
=== Construction ===
Trans TV was incorporated under a license from the Department of Trade and Industry, South Jakarta, with Number 809/BH.09.05/III/1998. Its shares are primarily owned by Para Inti Investindo, a subsidiary of Para Group. In August 1998, Trans TV's existence was published in State Gazette No. 8687 as PT Televisi Transformasi Indonesia. At that time, Trans TV was obtaining permission to broadcast; initially planned in October 1998 and based in Jakarta, it was operating from Trans TV Television Centre Headquarters at Jalan Kapten Pierre Tendean No. 12-14A in Mampang Prapatan, South Jakarta. In Jakarta, it was born as Televisi Transformasi Indonesia (Trans TV) and was granted a broadcasting license.

=== Metropolitan technician broadcasts ===
Test transmissions began on 1 July 2001, at 16:00 local time, and began trial transmission in Jabodetabek (the area surrounding Jakarta). Trans TV currently broadcasts via UHF (ultra high frequency) and was located on UHF channel 29 in Jabodetabek (via Jakarta) with the pattern of broadcasting techniques for runtime of three hours daily at Trans TV Television Centre Headquarters at Jalan Kapten Pierre Tendean No. 12-14A in Mampang Prapatan, South Jakarta, for the trial of technician stations for three months between 1 July to 30 September 2001.

=== Metropolitan trial programs ===
Trans TV's trial transmission stations started television broadcasting metropolitan programs. Trans-Tune in was officially inaugurated in Bandung and surroundings on 1 October 2001, at 16:00 local time in the afternoon. It was aired on the network by Kamera, which had started a test of transmission and was officially launched from Bandung Supermal, the most extensive city in the capital of West Java. Later, Trans TV was introduced to the public. On the studio stage, the two hosts bring interactive quizzes to attract potential audience members while presenting a series of music video clips. The program presents the News Division, which contains features both primetime evening-nightly, main prime news bulletin actual programs aired Berita Hari Ini (News Today) was broadcast for 30 minutes (mid-hours) and one news journalist reader for male and female, with the pattern of broadcasting techniques for runtime a 2-hours on daily at Trans TV Television Centre Headquarters at Jalan Kapten Pierre Tendean No. 12-14A in Mampang Prapatan, South Jakarta in Jakarta.

=== Trial of transmission ===
The channel officially started its trial broadcasts on 25 October 2001, at 16:00 WIB. It began trial transmission in Jabodetabek (the Jakarta surrounding area) and Bandung via UHF (ultra high frequency), and it was located on UHF channel 29 in Jabodetabek (via Jakarta) and UHF channel 42 in Bandung. It was the first time a channel tested its broadcast in two cities rather than in one. Its trial broadcast lasted for 45 days between 25 October and 15 November 2001, at Trans TV Television Centre Headquarters at Jalan Kapten Pierre Tendean No. 12-14A in Mampang Prapatan, South Jakarta.

=== Test of transmission ===
Its trial transmission stations started television broadcasting nationwide in Ramadhan 2001 at 16:00 local time in the afternoon. They began trial transmission in Jabodetabek (the area surrounding Jakarta). Trans-Tune was officially renamed Transvaganza, and it was runtime broadcasting for six hours each day. Trans TV started showing American movies and television series for television broadcasting for 29 days between 16 November and 14 December 2001, at Trans TV Television Centre Headquarters at Jalan Kapten Pierre Tendean No. 12-14A in Mampang Prapatan, South Jakarta. Trans TV went on air for the first time in a trial of broadcasts to seven cities, including Jabodetabek (via Jakarta, UHF 29), Bandung (UHF 42), Semarang (UHF 29), Yogyakarta (UHF 24), Solo (UHF 24), Surabaya (UHF 22), and Medan (UHF 27) in November 2001.

=== Opening ===
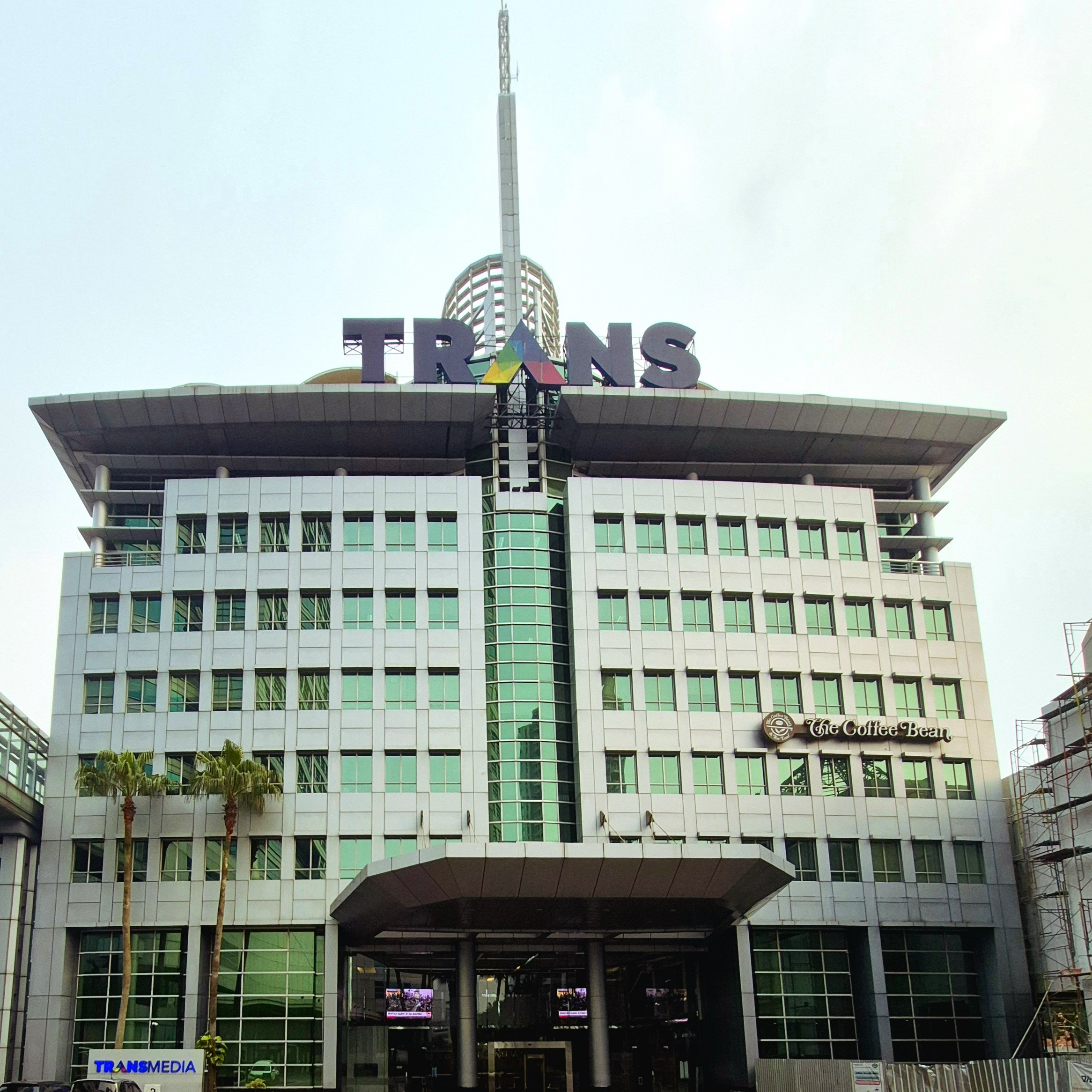
The Trans Media Building in Jakarta

Trans TV officially opened television broadcasting on-air nationwide on 15 December 2001, at 18:30 local time in the evening. In Jabodetabek (via Jakarta), the UHF channel for Trans TV is channel 29. Trans TV went on air for the first time in a trial of broadcasts to seven cities, such as Jakarta (UHF 29), Bandung (UHF 42), Semarang (UHF 29), Yogyakarta (UHF 24), Solo (UHF 24), Surabaya (UHF 22), and Medan (UHF 27). Other Indonesian cities are expected to follow later through the establishment of national television stations that relay the television broadcast of Trans TV. This channel is only available on pay and satellite television on the Indovision platform on channel 87, the First Media platform on channel 9, and the Palapa C2 satellite.

== Visual identity ==
=== Logos ===
Former logo of Trans TV, used from 10 November 2001, until 15 December 2013, as on-air logo.

From its founding until the logo change in 2013 (in which using the "Diamond A" logo that introduced in mid-2011), the Trans TV logo was originally a stylized rhombus (intended to be a diamond), with the inscription "TRANS" in the middle (in Optima typeface) and the letters T and V respectively in the top and bottom forming an isosceles right triangle. Other TV channels throughout Indonesia have used logos that share resemblances with Trans TV's old logo, such as TV Kutim, Bandung TV, and Sumut TV.

The logo (above) became grey instead when used on-air, and it was the first Indonesian TV channel to use grey logos permanently and continuously, especially during commercial breaks. This usage has been similarly followed by its competitors, and it has become the norm among national TV channels as of the 2010s to change their logos during breaks. Trans TV placed its logo on the bottom-right corner and it was in color during news program Kupas Tuntas until 2005, since then, their logos have been always placed on the top right position.

Current logo of Trans TV, used from 15 December 2013.

On 15 December 2013, in conjunction with the 12th anniversary of Trans Media, the logos of Trans TV (and Trans7) went into total overhaul. No longer featuring a symbol, this logo only consists of the inscription "TRɅNSTV" (in Gotham typeface) with stylized A, of which that letter is (also) interpreted as a diamond (the "A diamond" has been introduced since mid 2011).

=== Slogan history ===
- Milik Kita Bersama (Ours Together) (2001–present)
- The Hottest TV Channel (2004–2005)
- Setia Menemani (Faithful Accompany) (2021–2024, secondary)
- Hadir Penuh Inspirasi (2025, secondary)
- Pasti Happy! (2026, secondary)

=== Anniversary themed slogan ===
- Setahun Melangkah (First year steps, 2002)
- Dua Tahun Melangkah (Two years steps, 2003)
- Gemilang 3 Tahun (3 years brilliant, 2004)
- Trans four you (2005)
- Penta5 (2006)
- Trans Bi6 (2007)
- Trans 7uara (2008)
- Trans 8isa, Indonesia Bisa (2009)
- Trans 9emilang, Indonesia Gemilang (2010)
- Dekade Trans Untuk Indonesia (Decade Trans For Indonesia, 2011)
- 11 Tahun Trans Untuk Indonesia (11 years Trans For Indonesia, 2012)
- 12 Tahun Trans Untuk Indonesia (12 years Trans For Indonesia, 2013)
- 13 Karya Gemilang (2014)
- Inspirasi Negeri (Inspiration For The Nation, 2015)
- Transmedia 15 You (2016)
- #TerbangBersama 16 Tahun Transmedia (Flying Together, 2017)
- Sweet 17 (2018)
- Miracle 18 (2019)
- 19 Universe (2020)
- 2 Dekade Transmedia (Two Decade Of Transmedia, 2021)
- 21 In One (2022)
- Power Up (2023)
- Semangat Baru (New Spirit, 2024)
- 24 Ours (2025)

== Programs ==
Trans TV programming includes the news program Reportase Investigasi, variety shows such as Extravaganza, The Dorce Show, and Indonesian versions of Thank God You're Here (Akhirnya Datang Juga) and The Gong Show. It also broadcasts religious programs, movies, gossip shows, soap operas, and cartoons.

=== Sports programming ===
Trans TV has broadcast every Thomas & Uber Cup since 2002 (except 2006 on Lativi and 2010 on Trans7). Sport programs included the 2002 Tiger Cup, La Liga, and Copa del Rey in 2001–2003. Since 2012, Trans TV has broadcast football matches from the FA Community Shield, La Liga (together with Trans7), Copa del Rey (excluding the final match), England National Football, and the British FA Cup.

Since 15 December 2017, Trans Media, together with Telkom Indonesia, Kompas Gramedia, and MNC Media (MNC Vision only), has officially obtained the broadcasting rights for the 2018 FIFA World Cup.

=== International programming ===
- The Flash
- iZombie
- Arrow
- Gotham
- EXO's Showtime
- The Last Empress

== Presenters ==
=== Former ===
- Asran Shady (now at Indosiar)
- Osa Budi Santosa
- Riza Primadi
- Iwan Ahmad Sudirwan (now at TVR Parlemen)
- Budi Irawan
- Muhammad Rizky (now at tvOne)
- Noni Wibisono
- Yudi Yudawan (now at CNN Indonesia)
- Leman
- Ratna Dumila
- Reza Prahadian
- Tina Talisa
- Fitri Megantara (now at MetroTV)
- Dian Mirza (returned to RCTI, also now at iNews and Sindonews TV)
- Budi Irawan
- Pramesywara Adisendjaya (now at iNews, GTV and Sindonews TV)
- Virgianty Kusumah
- Ryan Wiedaryanto (now at Indosiar)
- Utrich Farzah (now at Indosiar)
- Woro Windrati (now at Kompas TV)
- Zulfikar Naghi (now at Indosiar)
- Gede Satria (now at iNews)
- Adita Nanda
- Loviana Dian (now at BTV)
- Alyssa Akilie
- Andromeda Amanda
- Anisa Sulandana
- Arrumaisha Rani
- Anie Rahmi (now at MetroTV)
- Aryadita Utama
- Berdho Alase
- Christian Reinaldo
- Daisy Weku
- Deddy Zebua
- Dewi Fatma
- Fransisca Rathy
- Kaze Pury
- Lisa Namuri Arif
- Nabil Basalamah
- Ranggani Puspandya
- Rheini Abhinawa
- Rizki Washarti Siregar
- Suci Lee
- Yasmin Muntaz
- Novieta Putri
- Prabu Revolusi (now at iNews and Sindonews TV as a host on the program Konspirasi Prabu)
- Ferdi Hasan
- Rieke Diah Pitaloka
- Shahnaz Mariela
- Inez Tagor
- Edwin Manangsang
- Ahmad Alhabsyi
- Subki Al Bughury
- Divi Lukmansyah
- Shanta Curanggana
- Seila Siregar
- Bayu Andrianto (now at tvOne)
- Nawayogi Kusuma (now at RCTI)
- Berdho Alase
- Anggi Agasi
- Dwi Saraswati
- Rury Demsy
- Putri Ayudya
- Iqbal Kurniadi (now at CNN Indonesia)
- Ivan Kurnia
- Budi Adiputro (now become independent journalist and operates Total Politik's content on YouTube and Spotify)
- Tifanny Raytama (now at CNN Indonesia)
- Kelly Charenina
- Bunga Harum Dani (now at TVRI)
- Reni Risty
- Harly Valentina
- Riska Amelia (now at Polri TV)
- Saesarez Novandito

== See also ==
- List of television stations in Indonesia
- Trans7
