= List of radio stations in Jakarta =

This is a list of online and AM/FM Jakarta radio stations, Indonesia, and their frequencies.

Call letter is shown to distinguish some radio stations from their regional counterparts (for example Radio Elshinta in Jakarta and Bandung). Indonesia uses call letter for FM radio stations.

== FM (MHz) ==
=== Jakarta Special Region ===
Call sign	Frequency	RDS	Radio Name	Licensee (Network)	Genre
PM2FPB	87.6 FM	-	The Rockin' Life Jakarta	PT Radio Antarnusa Djaja (MRA Media Group)	Adult contemporary, Rock music, and Fresh music
PM2FHF	88.0 FM	MUSTANG	Mustang 88 FM	PT Radio Mustang Utama (Mahaka Radio Integra)	Top 40/CHR
PM2FAR	88.4 FM	GLOBAL	Global Radio	PT Radio Arief Rahman Hakim (MNC Radio Networks)	Top 40/CHR
—N/a	88.8 FM	RRI	RRI Programa 3	LPP Radio Republik Indonesia	Public radio/News/Talk
PM2FPA	89.2 FM	-	Campursari FM	PT Radio Metro Jaya Kartika (Publica Law Firm)	Campursari, Dangdut
PM2FGM	89.6 FM	PADEL CORNER	Padel Corner Radio	PT Radio Mustika Abadi (Publica Law Firm)	Adult contemporary
PM2FGZ	90.0 FM	ELSHINTA	Radio Elshinta	PT Radio Elshinta (Elshinta Media Group)	News/Talk
PM2FAP	90.4 FM	VOKS RADIO	VOKS Radio	PT Radio Muara Abdinusa (Kutus Kutus Group)	Adult contemporary
PM2FAT	90.8 FM	-	Ozon Radio Jakarta	PT Radio Suara Gema Pembangunan Utama	Adult contemporary
—N/a	91.2 FM	-	RRI Programa 1 Jakarta	LPP Radio Republik Indonesia	Public radio, General
PM2FAQ	91.6 FM	INDIKA FM	Indika FM	PT Radio Indika Millenia (Indika Group)	Adult contemporary
PM2FGJ	92.0 FM	SONORA	Radio Sonora	PT Radio Sonora (KG Radio Network)	News/talk, Adult Contemporary, Top 40/CHR
PM2FGO	92.4 FM	-	PAS FM	PT Primaswara Adi Spirit Semesta (CPP RadioNet)	Adult Contemporary, News/Talk
—N/a	92.8 FM	-	RRI Programa 4 Jakarta	LPP Radio Republik Indonesia	Public radio, Culture, Dangdut
PM2FAW	93.2 FM	HOT 93.2FM	Hot FM	PT Radio Merpati Darmawangsa (Mahaka Radio Integra)	Dangdut Indonesian pop
PM2FGF	94.3 FM	-	Good Radio	PT Radio Garda Asia Bumi (Koridor & KBR)	Classic hits, News/talk
PM2FAV	94.7 FM	UFM	UFM Jakarta	PT Radio Agustina Junior (Prana Media & KBR)	Top 40/CHR
PM2FHN	95.1 FM	KIS	Kis FM	PT Radio Kirana Insan Suara (Mahaka Radio Integra)	Adult contemporary, Top 40/CHR
PM2FPD	95.5 FM	RASFM	RASfm Jakarta	PT Radio Alaikassalam Sejahtera (As-Syafi'iyah Islamic Foundation)	Muslim radio, Indonesian pop
PM2FGV	95.9 FM	-	Smart FM Jakarta	PT Radio Smart Media Utama (KG Radio Network)	News/talk (Business), Adult contemporary
PM2FAX	96.3 FM	RPK	RPK FM	PT Radio Pelita Kasih (Communion of Churches in Indonesia & KBR)	Christian radio
PM2FGD	96.7 FM	HITZ FM	Hitz FM	PT Radio Swara Rhadana Dunia	Top 40/CHR
PM2FGY	97.1 FM	RDI	RDI	PT Radio Suara Monalisa (MNC Radio Networks)	Dangdut, Indonesian pop
PM3FBJ	97.9 FM	FEMALE	Female Radio	PT Radio Kayu Manis (FeMale Group)	Adult Contemporary
PM2FGX	98.3 FM	-	Mandarin Station	PT Radio Chakrawala Gitaswara	Mandarin pop
PM2FGU	98.7 FM	GEN FM	Gen FM	PT Radio Attahiriyah (Mahaka Radio Integra)	Top 40/CHR
PM2FGW	99.1 FM	DELTA FM	Delta FM	PT Radio Delta Insani (Masima Radio Network)	Adult contemporary
PM2FAS	99.9 FM	Z99.9FM	Z FM (Z 99.9 FM)	PT Radio Dengan Anda Bahagia (MPG Media)	Adult contemporary, top 40
PM2FGG	101.0 FM	-	Jak FM	PT Radio Suara Irama Indah (Mahaka Radio Integra)	Adult contemporary
PM2FGM	101.4 FM	-	I-Swara	PT Radio Suara Kedjajaan (MRA Media Group)	Indonesian pop
PM2FGK	102.2 FM	PRAMBORS	Prambors FM	PT Radio Prambors (Masima Radio Network)	Adult contemporary, Top 40/CHR
PM2FGL	102.6 FM	CAMAJAYA FM 102.6	Camajaya FM	PT Radio Camajaya Surya Nada	Classic hits, oldies
PM3FRS	103.0 FM	POP FM	Pop FM Jakarta	PT Radio Irnusa Ria (CPP RadioNet)	Indonesian pop, Dangdut, Top 40/CHR
PM2FGP	103.4 FM	-	DFM	PT Radio Taman Mini (Owned by Soeharto family)	Dangdut
PM2FGN	103.8 FM	XCHANNEL	X Channel (Radio Cipta Suara)	PT Radio Pesona Gita Anindita (Independent)	Indonesian pop, Rock
PM2FAY	104.2 FM	104.2 FM MS-TRI	MS Tri FM	PT Radio Media Suara Trisakti	Top 40/CHR
PM2FGS	104.6 FM	TRIJAYA	MNC Trijaya FM	PT Radio Trijaya Shakti (MNC Radio Networks)	News/talk, Adult Contemporary
—N/a	105.0 FM	-	RRI Programa 2 Jakarta	LPP Radio Republik Indonesia	Public radio, Adult contemporary, CHR
PM2FGQ	105.4 FM	-	CBB FM	PT Radio Chakti Bhudi Bhakti	Dangdut, Campursari
PM2FGI	105.8 FM	MOST1058	MOST Radio	PT Radio Ramako Jaya Raya (Mahaka Radio Integra)	News/talk, Classic hits, oldies, Classic rock
PM3FAU	106.2 FM	-	Bens Radio	PT Radio Bergaya Nyanyian Irama Sejati	Ethnic, Indonesian pop, Dangdut, Top 40/CHR
PM2FGR	106.6 FM	-	V Radio	PT Radio Sabda Sosok Sohor (MNC Radio Networks)	Top 40/CHR
PM2FAM	107.7 FM	-	Mandala Muda Radio	PT Radio Suara Melin Perdana (CND Radio Network)	Top 40/CHR, Adult Contemporary

=== Jakarta Metropolitan Area ===
These radio stations serve satellite cities of Jabodetabek; they may have their broadcasts received in only parts of Jakarta. The frequencies of the stations have been deliberately designed not to overlap with radio stations at Jakarta.

Call sign	Frequency	Radio Name	City of License	Licensee (Network)	Genre
PM3BGP	88.6 MHz	Radio Elpas	Bogor	PT Radio Swara Irama Kusuma Sena	Top 40/Dangdut
PM2FPA	89.8 FM	Radio Dangdut Asia (RDA)	Jakarta	PT Radio Citra Budaya Banten	Top 40/Dangdut
PM3FRQ	93.4 FM	KISI FM (Sentra Medika Group)	Bogor	PT Kancah Irama Suara Indonesia	Top 40/CHR
PM3FSM	93.9 FM	Mersi FM	Tangerang	PT Radio Swara Mersidiona	Dangdut
PM3BGD	95.3 FM	Teman FM	Bogor	PT Radio Bandar Media	Top 40/Dangdut
PM2FPJ	95.7 FM	RAU Jakarta	Jakarta	PT Radio Adi Utama Jayakarta	Dangdut
PM2FGT	99.5 FM	Smooth FM	Tangerang	PT Radio Bahana Sanada Dunia (MPG Media)	Adult contemporary
PM3FSA	100.8 FM	Megaswara FM (Megaswara Network)	Bogor	PT Radio Citra Mega Swara	Adult Contemporary, Top 40/CHR, Classic rock, Dangdut
PM2FHP	102.4 FM	Properti Media FM	Jakarta	PT Radio Forum Koridor (Propertimedia.com)	News/Talk
PM2FPT	105.6 FM	Radio Tehnik Group Jakarta	Jakarta	PT Radio Tehnik Group	Adult Contemporary, Top 40/CHR, Classic rock, News/Talk
PM2FPM	107.1 FM	Media Dangdut Radio	Jakarta	PT Radio Aditya Senarai	Muslim radio, News/Talk, Dangdut
PM3FHJ	107.5 FM	TJD Radio	Jakarta	Lemenade Audio/Video Content (PT Garuda Jaya 69)	Hot AC
PM2FAM	107.7 FM	RRI Pro 5 Jakarta (Radio JJM)	Jakarta	PT Radio Suara Samudera	Top 40/CHR
PM2FHT	107.7 FM	Radio Terbeken FM	Jakarta	PT Radio Swara Terbeken Musik	Muslim radio, News/Talk, Dangdut, Community
PM2FHU	107.8 FM	Radio Mitra FM (Kabar Inklusif)	Jakarta	PT Radio Surya Mitra Swara	Dangdut, News/Talk, Community
PM2FHM	108.0 FM	Radio Marketing	Jakarta	PT Maju Jaya Dan Ruang Kreatif	Community

== AM (kHz) ==
- 522 Propertimedia.com
- 531 Vision Radio 1
- 603 Radio Marketing
- 630 Radio Samhan
- 648 Radio REM SSK
- 666 Radio Nam Nam Nam
- 702 JSS3 Radio
- 738 Radio Bharata
- 756 Radio Rodja
- 828 Radio Berita Klasik
- 1026 Suara Khatulistiwa
- 693 Radio Muara
- 810 Buana Komunika
- 936 Trax Jakarta
- 1008 KBR Jakarta
- 1035 LNR Radio Program 1 AM
- 1062 Radio Cendrawasih
- 1134 Radio Safari
- 1098 Radio UNTAR - Universitas Tarumanagara (VOMS)
- 1152 Radio KAJ
- 1170 Radio Jalesveva Jayamahe (JJM Suara Samudera)
- 1224 IRS Radio
- 1296 Kabar Inklusif
- 1350 Cahaya Sufi Radio
- 1404 Radio Hijau (Bandar Koplo Jakarta)
- 1440 Radio Rona MKB Jakarta
- 1494 Radio Angkatan Bersenjata (Radio Suara Jakarta)
- 1530 Radio Masjid Sunda Kelapa
- 1611 Hidupin Radio Network
- 1620 Si Mesin Waktu Radio

== Internet radio ==
Available	Radio Name	Licensee (Network)	Genre
RRI Digital	RRI Jazz Channel	LPP Radio Republik Indonesia	Smooth jazz
RRI Digital	RRI Kanal Informasi Kebencanaan	LPP Radio Republik Indonesia	Natural disaster information
RRI Digital	RRI Kanal Kenangan	LPP Radio Republik Indonesia	Adult contemporary
-	KBR	Media Lintas Inti Nusantara	News/talk
Joox; Noice; Aware	Trax	PT Radio Tiara Victory (RCS Studio)	CHR
Joox; Noice; Aware	Brava Radio	PT Radio Inspirasi Bermutu (RCS Studio)	Smooth jazz, classic hits, Quiet storm
Noice	Rayya Channel	Mahaka Radio Integra	Muslim radio, Indonesian pop
Noice	Noice Radio	Mahaka Radio Integra	Podcast
RCTI+ Roov	Looks Radio	MNC Media	Adult contemporary
RCTI+ Roov	XYZ Radio	MNC Media	Top 40/CHR
RCTI+ Roov	ZW7 Radio	MNC Media	Top 40/CHR
RCTI+ Roov	GRIM Radio	MNC Media	Thriller podcast
-	Dreamers Radio	PT Mediaworks Indonesia	Top 40/CHR
-	Loker Musik Radio Indonesia	-	Top 40/CHR
-	Music City Digicast	PT Radio Mitra Carita 16	Top 40/CHR, Adult contemporary
-	Radio KAJ	Roman Catholic Archdiocese of Jakarta	Catholic radio
-	Radio TVR Parlemen	Dewan Perwakilan Rakyat Republik Indonesia	Legislature radio
AXR	AXR Jakarta	AXR Pte Ltd	Adult contemporary, international news and sport. Targeted at British, Australia and New Zealand residents in Jakarta.

== Defunct radio stations ==
=== FM (MHz) ===
==== Jakarta Special Region ====
Call sign	Frequency	RDS	Radio Name	Licensee (Network)	Genre	First air date	Last air date
PM2FPC	97.5 FM	MOTION RADIO	Motion Radio	PT Radio Safari Bina Budaya (KG Radio Network)	Top 40/CHR, Hip-Hop	1988	2026
PM2FGH	101.8 FM	BAHANA	Bahana FM	PT Radio Terik Matahari Bahana Pembangunan (Masima Radio Network)	Adult contemporary	1983	2025

=== AM (kHz) ===
- 999 RRI (National Radio) Pro-3 (Transmitter moved to Bandung, West Java)
- 1008 Persada Radio
- 1098 Voice of Metropolitan Students
- 1332 RRI (National Radio) Pro-4

=== Internet radio ===
Available	Radio Name	Licensee (Network)	Genre
CubMu	Vision Radio1	PT Radio Transuara Indonesia (Trans Media)	News/talk, Top 40/CHR
