= Setiabudi Integritas (Transjakarta) =

Bus rapid transit station in Jakarta, Indonesia

6 17 Setiabudi Integritas
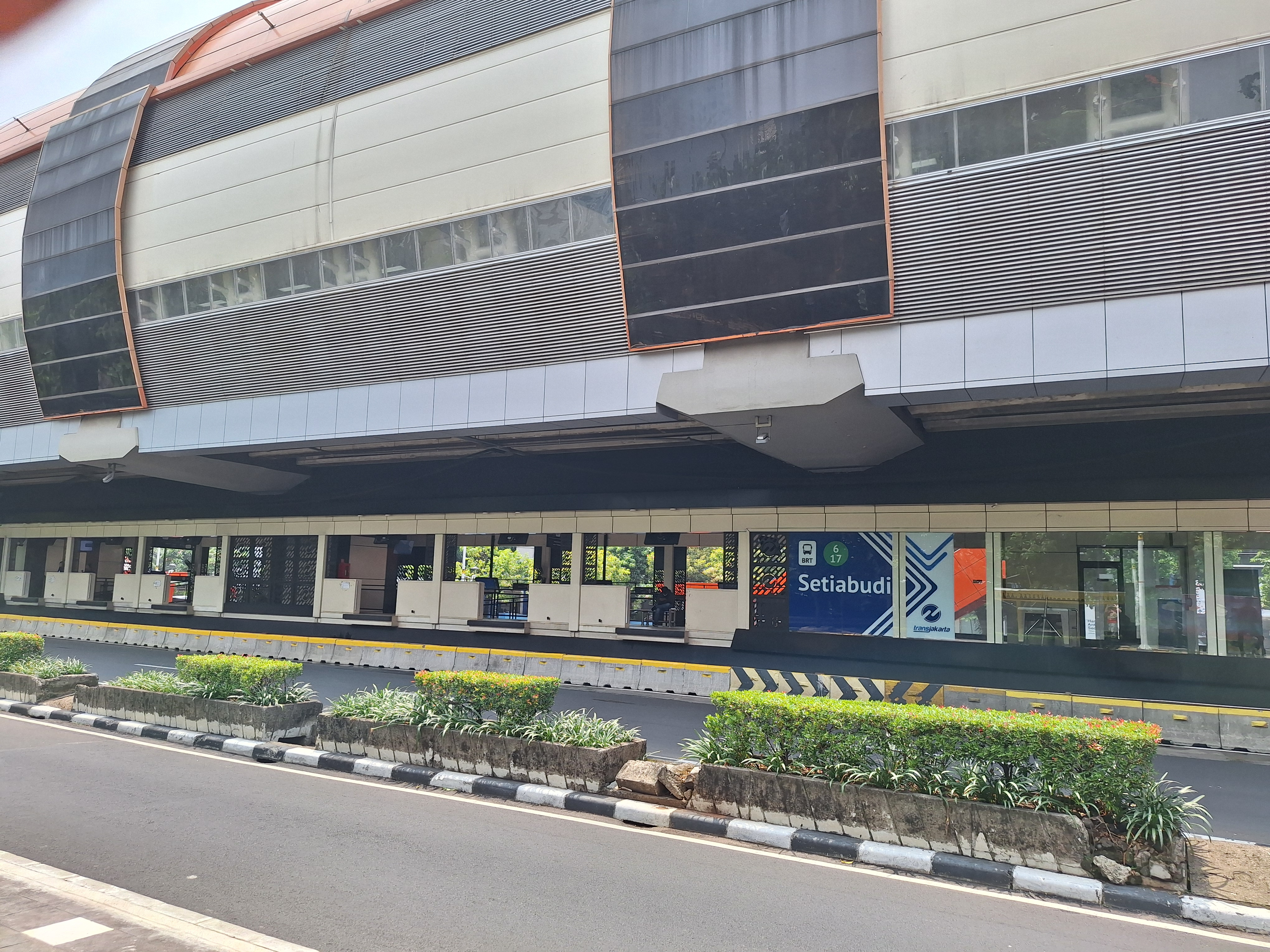
- New station viewed from outside, 2023

General information
- Location: H.R. Rasuna Said St., Setiabudi, Setiabudi, South Jakarta 12910, Indonesia
- Coordinates: 6.20801°S 106.82983°E
- System: Transjakarta
- Owner: Transjakarta
- Operator: Transjakarta
- Lines: List of Transjakarta corridors#Cross-corridor routes List of TransJakarta corridors#Corridor 6 List of TransJakarta corridors#Cross-corridor routes
- Platforms: Single island platform
- Connections: Setiabudi

Construction
- Structure type: At-grade
- Cycle facilities: No

History
- Opened: 27 January 2007
- Rebuilt: 24 March 2023
- Former names: Setiabudi Utara AINI

Services
Preceding		Following
Halimun One-way operation	Corridor 4 Route 4D	Kuningan Madya towards Patra Kuningan
Kuningan Madya One-way operation	Corridor 6	Flyover Kuningan towards Galunggung
Kuningan Madya towards Ragunan	Corridor 6	Galunggung One-way operation
Kuningan Madya towards Ragunan	Corridor 6 Route 6A	Bundaran HI Astra towards Balai Kota
Kuningan Madya towards Puri Beta 2	Corridor 13 Route 13E Only available on weekends	Flyover Kuningan Terminus
Kuningan Madya towards Puri Beta 2	Corridor 13 Route L13E Only available on weekdays	Flyover Kuningan Terminus
Location

Setiabudi Integritas is a Transjakarta bus rapid transit station located on H.R. Rasuna Said Street, Setiabudi, Setiabudi, South Jakarta, Indonesia, serving Corridor 6. It is located beneath the Setiabudi LRT station and is named after the district it is located in.

== History ==
The station opened as Setiabudi Utara alongside the rest of Corridor 6 on 27 January 2007. Until 2023, the station was officially referred to as Setiabudi Utara AINI. The original station structure had two bus gates on each side of the platform. Along the stretch of Corridor 6 that runs on H.R. Rasuna Said Street, it was the only station (and one of the very few on the network) with a significant elevation difference between both sides of the street, and as such, the western side of the platform was given a flight of stairs.

During the Jabodebek LRT construction works from 2017 to 2023, a temporary structure was in operation to the north of the current location, while the new station was built underneath the LRT station. Before it opened for passenger service, the station was used as a lounge for Royaltrans drivers. The temporary building utilized disused container boxes, which had four gates on each side of the platform with a portable toilet as an amenity.

After the LRT construction completed, all operations were moved to the new building on 24 March 2023. It was later given a new name, Setiabudi, a name that was formerly used by a former BRT station serving Corridor 1 until 2014, when it was demolished for the Jakarta MRT construction but was never rebuilt.

On 21 June 2026, Setiabudi BRT station was officially renamed into Setiabudi Integritas by Jakarta Governor Pramono Anung as part of the collaboration between the Jakarta provincial government (via Transjakarta) and the Corruption Eradication Commission (KPK), hence the name "Integritas" (Indonesian for "integrity"). This is due to the fact that the BRT station is located nearby the KPK headquarters to the northeast. According to the chief of KPK, Setyo Budiyanto, the new name is expected to cultivate communal integrity from public spaces.

== Building and layout ==
The current station structure is built 200 meters away from the temporary station. It now has six gates on each side of the platform. The two sides still have a significant elevation difference, and as such, there is now a ramp and flight of stairs in the middle to compensate for the elevation difference.

There are also other amenities, such as disabled-friendly toilets, prayer room, and a sink.

West	towards Flyover Kuningan	towards Galunggung and towards Balai Kota	(Bundaran HI Astra) ↑
West	towards Flyover Kuningan	towards Galunggung and towards Balai Kota	(Flyover Kuningan) →
Island platform, doors open on the right hand side
East	← (Kuningan Madya) towards Ragunan	towards Patra Kuningan and towards Puri Beta 2

== Non-BRT bus services ==
The following is the list of non-BRT bus services available inside or outside the station, last updated on 30 October 2024:

Type	Route	Destination	Notes
Inner city feeder		Lebak Bulus—Senen Bus Terminal	Inside the station
Inner city feeder		Manggarai Station → Blok M	Inside the station
Royaltrans (premium)		Cibubur Junction—Setiabudi LRT Station	Outside the station
Royaltrans (premium)		Summarecon Mall Bekasi—Setiabudi LRT Station	Outside the station
Royaltrans (premium)		South City Cinere—Setiabudi LRT Station	Outside the station
Mikrotrans Jak Lingko	JAK 18	Duren Kalibata Station—Guntur	Outside the station

== Nearby places ==
- The St. Regis Jakarta
- Atrium Mulia
  - Embassy of Timor-Leste
- MD Place, headquartes of MD Entertainment
  - MDTV
  - MD Pictures
  - MD Animation
- Menara Duta
- Setiabudi Tax Office
- LINA Building
- Graha Arda
- Corruption Eradication Commission (KPK) headquarters
- Menara 2 BTN
- Imperium Tower
  - Embassy of Bosnia and Herzegovina
  - Mahaka Radio Integra
    - Gen 98.7 FM
    - Jak 101 FM
    - Hot 93.2 FM
    - Most Radio 105.8 FM
    - Kis 95.1 FM
    - Mustang 88.0 FM

== Incidents ==
- On 2 August 2021, a man boarding a bus at Setiabudi station had his phone stolen by two pickpockets. The two perpetrators were recorded on a CCTV camera committing their crime.
- On 14 September 2024, a car crashed into the movable concrete barriers (MCBs) and sustained severe damage. On 22 October 2024, another car crashed into the MCBs from the opposite direction. The incident caused severe congestion.

== Gallery ==
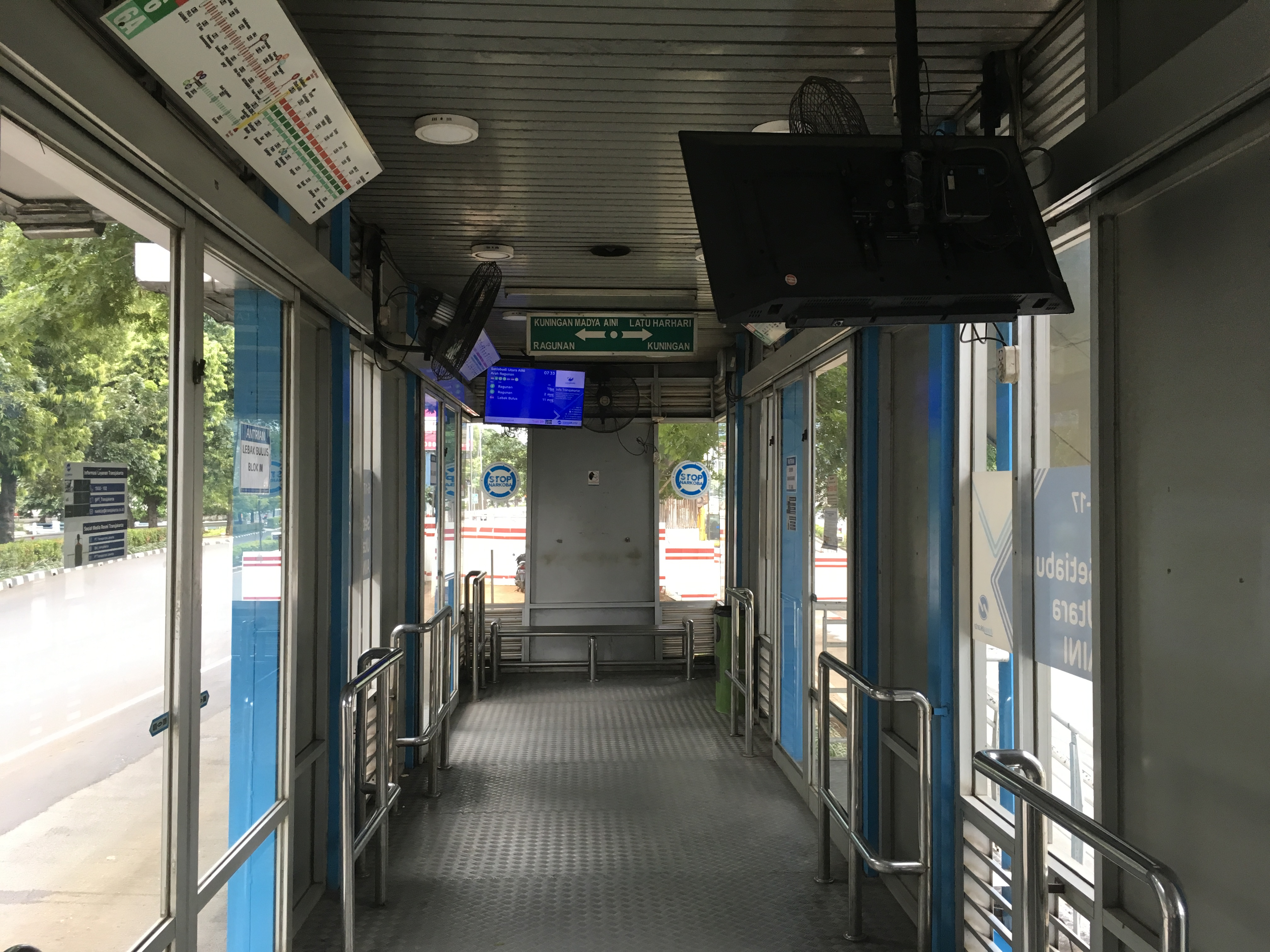
Interior of the old station building prior to LRT construction

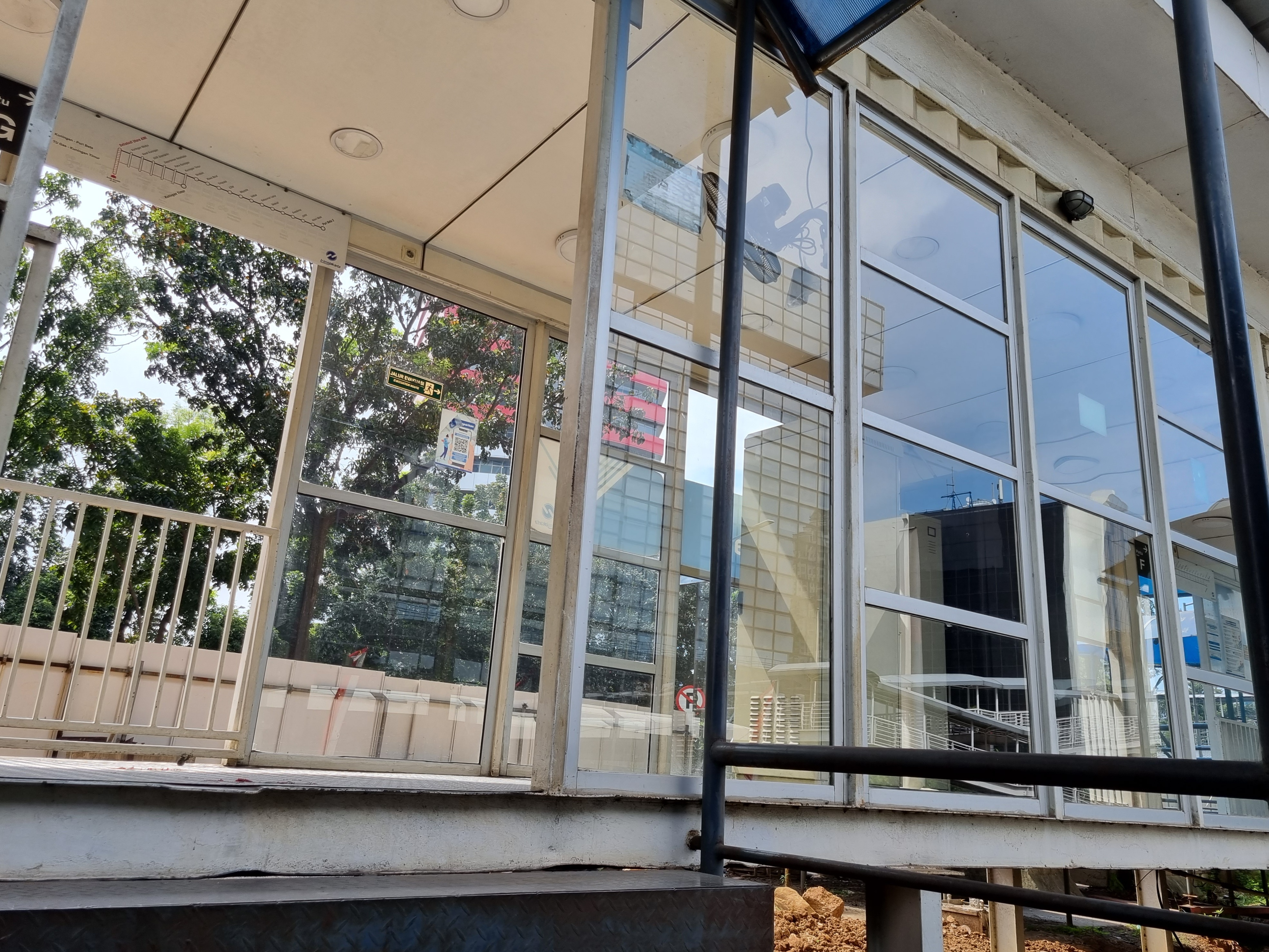
Temporary station structure during LRT construction

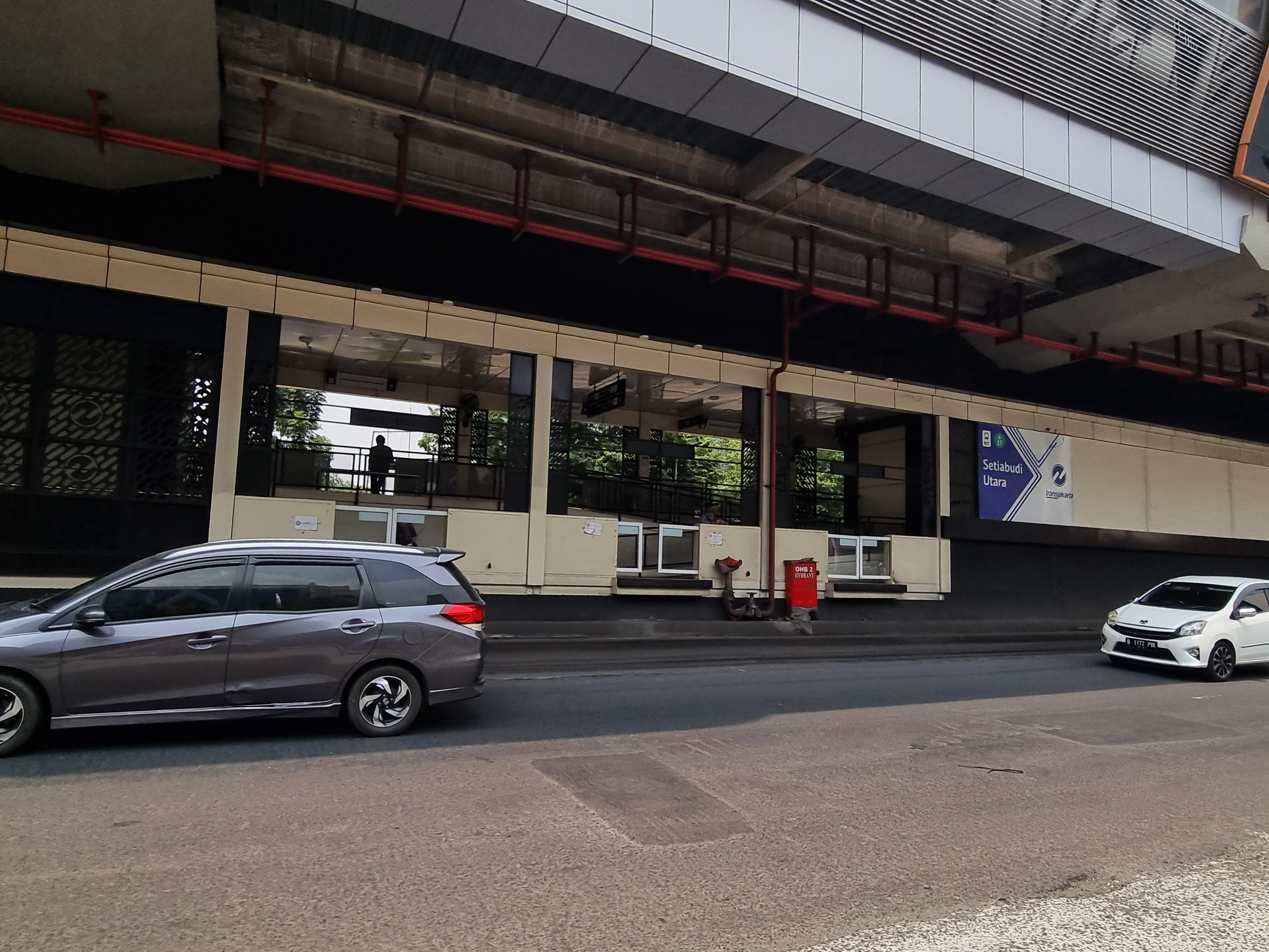
The new station with its old name, 2023

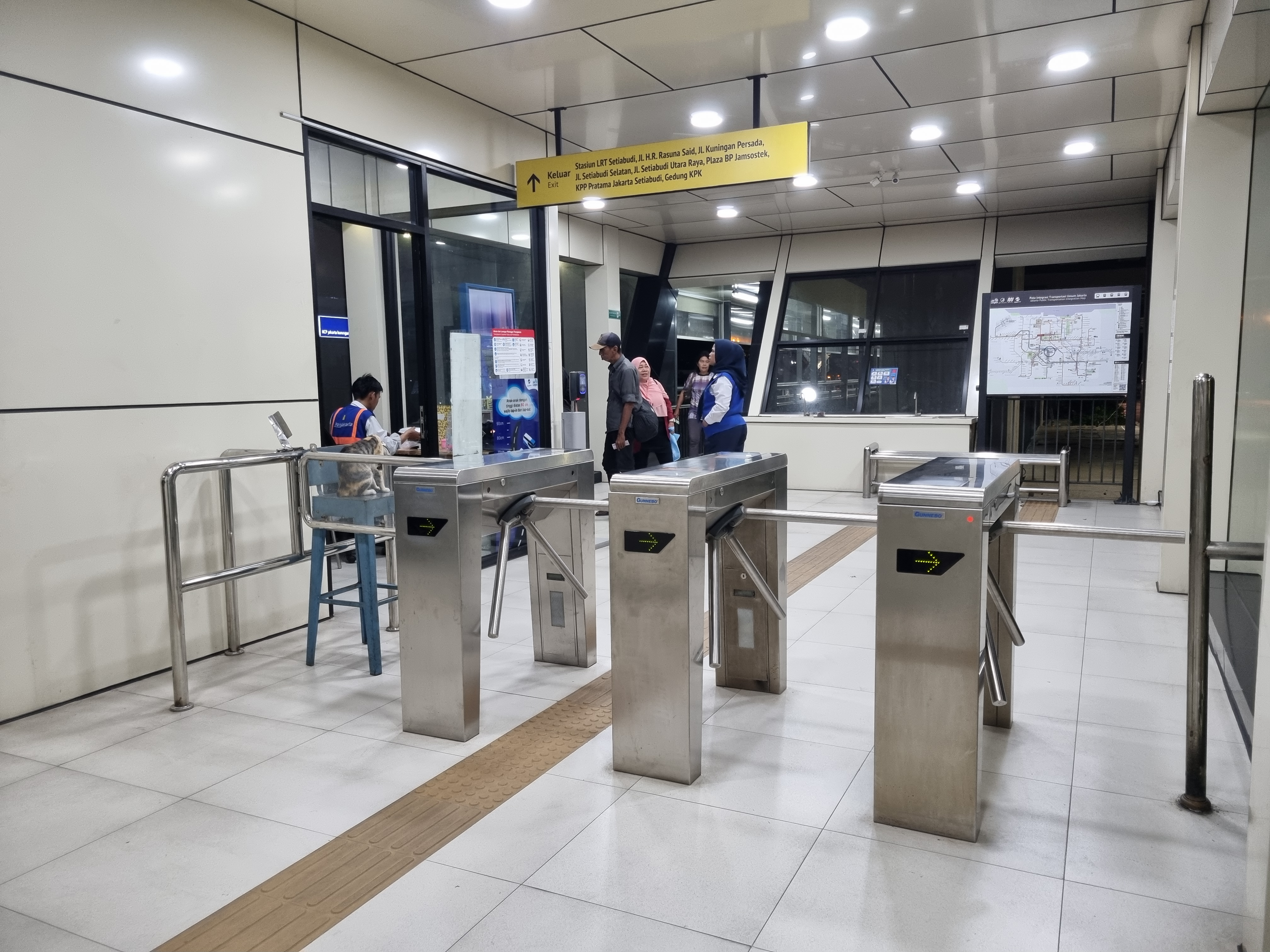
Ticket concourse, 2023

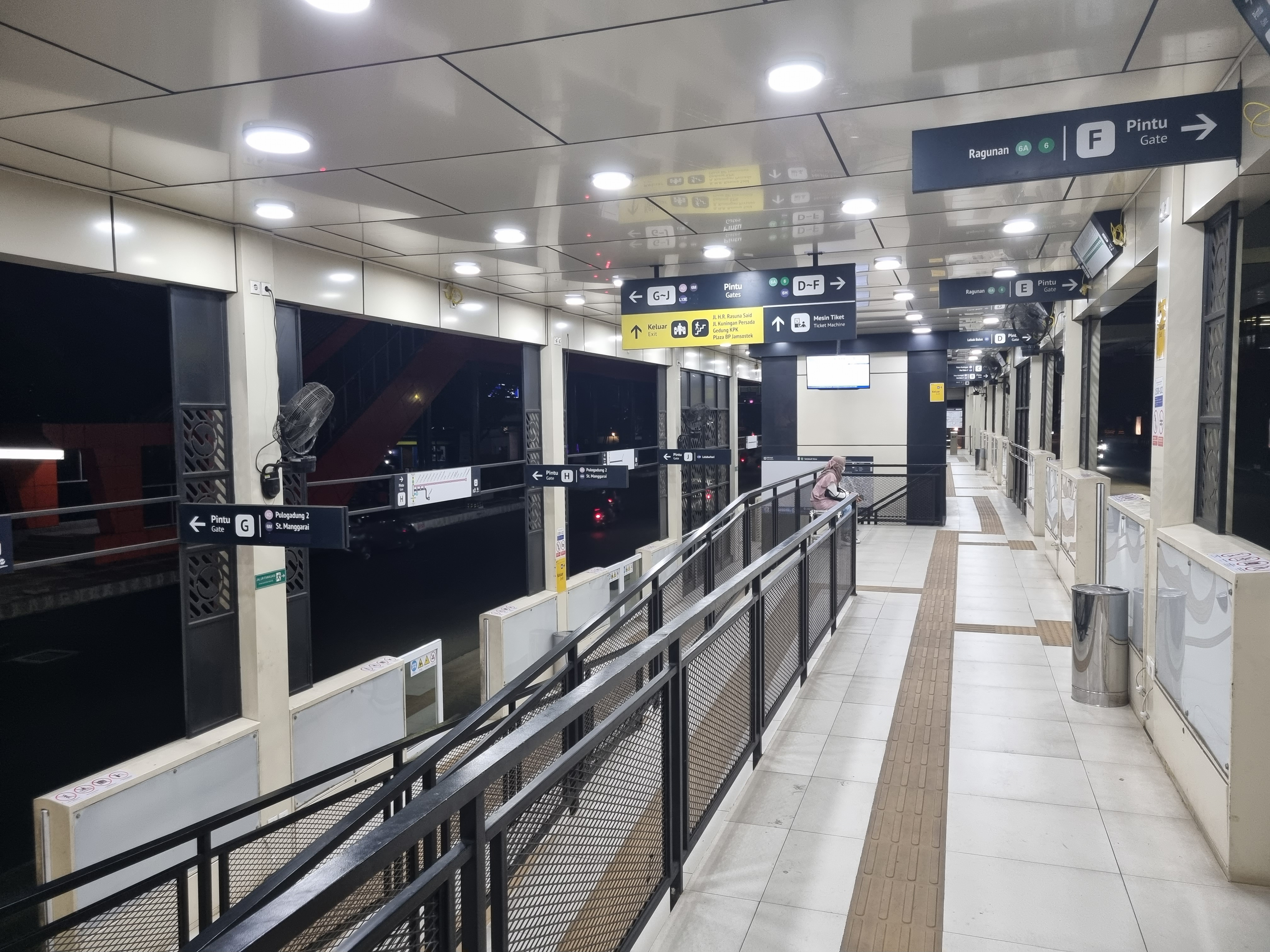
Interior of the station, 2023

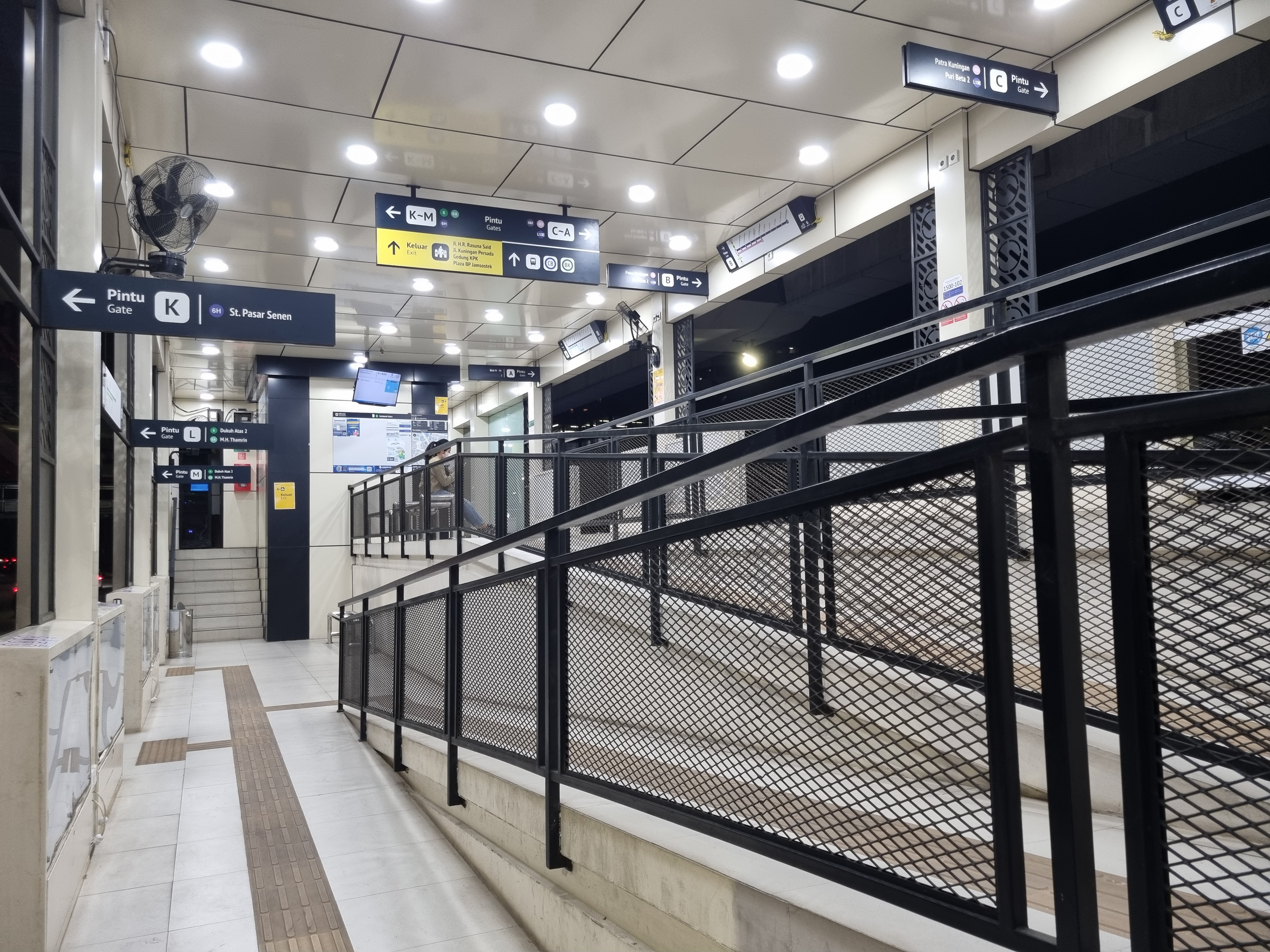
Ramp connecting both sides of the platform with significant elevation difference, 2023

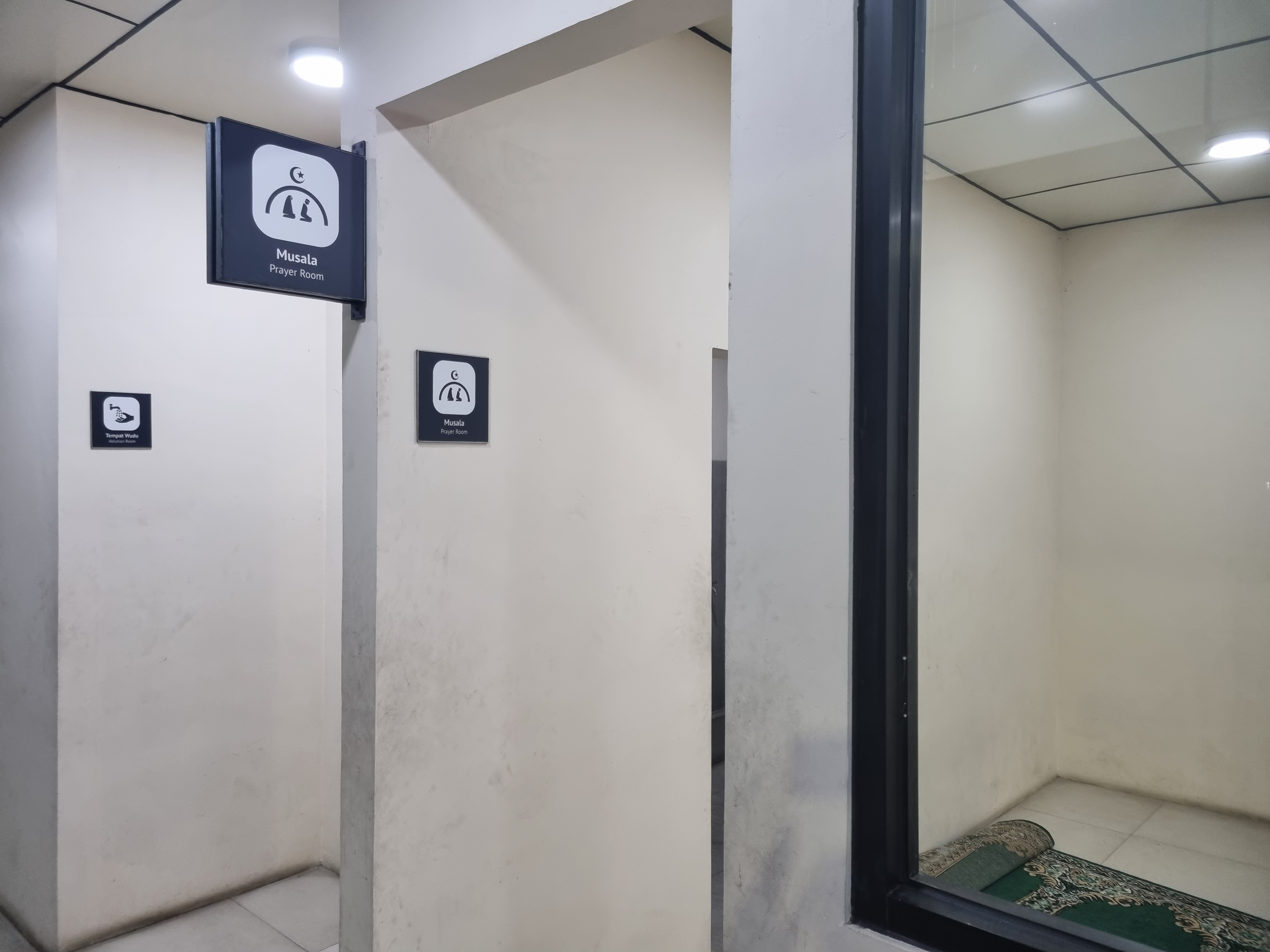
Prayer room (musala), 2023
