= Mahaka X =

Indonesian media and entertainment company

PT Mahaka Media Tbk
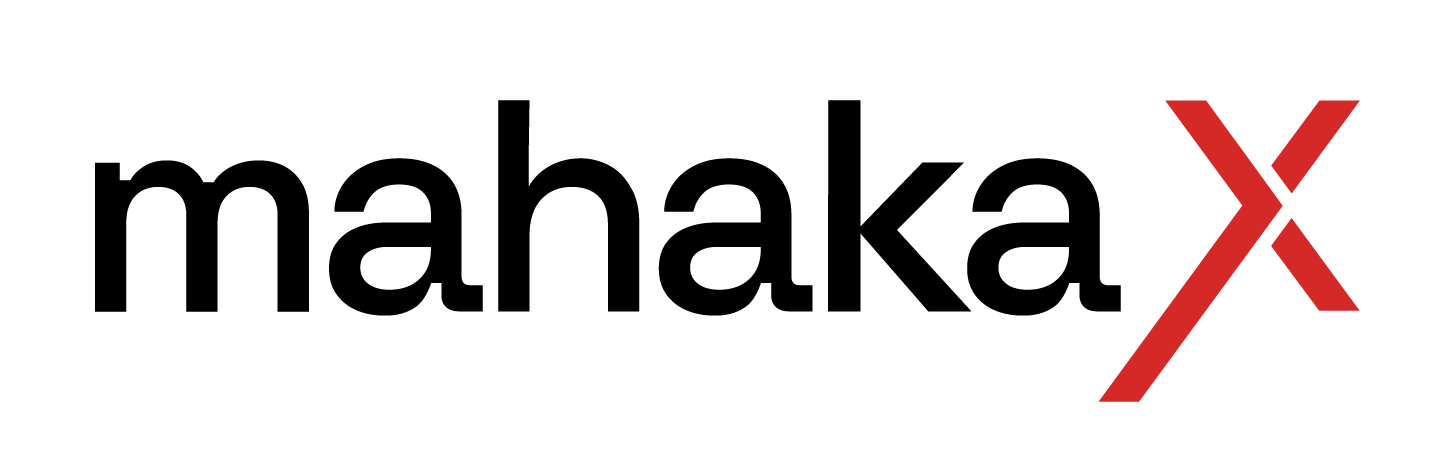
- Trade name: Mahaka X
- Formerly: Abdi Bangsa (1992–2010)
- Company type: Public company
- Traded as: IDX: ABBA
- Industry: Media
- Founded: 28 November 1992; 33 years ago
- Founder: Erick Thohir
- Headquarters: Jakarta, Indonesia
- Area served: Indonesia
- Key people: Dr Abdulgani (chairman); Adrian Syarkawi (vice chairman)
- Products: Broadcasting, publishing, out of home and digital media
- Revenue: ▲ Rp 251 billion (2019)
- Operating income: ▼ -Rp 29 billion (2019)
- Net income: ▼ -Rp 45 billion (2019)
- Total assets: ▼ Rp 413 billion (2019)
- Total equity: ▼ Rp 107 billion (2019)
- Owners: Beyond Media (40.47%); Solic Kreasi Baru (13.77%); Mediahuis Ireland (7.19%)
- Number of employees: 1,409 (2015)
- Website: www.mahakax.com

PT Mahaka Media Tbk, traded as Mahaka X (stylized as mahakaX) since 2022, formerly known as Abdi Bangsa, is an Indonesian media and entertainment company founded by Erick Thohir. The group owns and operates the printed newspapers Harian Republika and Harian Indonesia, a magazine (Golf Digest), a regional free to air television station (JakTV), and a radio station (Gen FM).

== History ==
Mahaka Media was originally founded with the name PT Abdi Bangsa on 28 November 1992. On 3 April 2002, Mahaka Media become a public company when it registered its shares as PT Abdi Bangsa Tbk in the Jakarta Stock Exchange (BEJ).

In 2010, PT Abdi Bangsa officially changed its name to PT Mahaka Media Tbk.

In 2019, its founder and president commissioner Erick Thohir stepped down from the company to join the government as Minister of State Owned Enterprise, leaving the position he held at the company to R Harry Zulnardy.

On 27 June 2022, Mahaka Media changed its corporate branding to Mahaka X in order to shift the company's focus from media convergence to media tech.

== Business units ==
=== Newspapers ===
- Republika
- Harian Indonesia

=== Magazines ===
- Golf Digest

=== TV Stations ===
- JakTV (co-owned with Artha Graha Network)

=== Radio Services ===
- Mahaka Radio Integra
  - Gen 98.7 FM (Jakarta)
  - Gen 103.1 FM (Surabaya)
  - Jak 101 FM
  - Hot 93.2 FM
  - Most Radio 105.8 FM
  - Kis 95.1 FM
  - Mustang 88.0 FM
  - Noice

=== Other ===
- Mahaka Square
- CodeX Academy
- Inspire
- Xpose
- CreativeIntel
- Alive Indonesia
- Archytect

== Company management ==
=== Board of Directors ===
- President Director: Tubagus Farash Farich
- Director of Finance: Harry Danui
- Director of Product and Creative Development: Ahmad Aditya
- Director of Sales and Marketing: Henny M. Chandra
- Director of Corporate Affair and Corporate Secretary: Agoosh Yoosran

=== Board of Commissioners ===
- President commissioner : Mahendra Agakhan Thohir
- Commissioner: Rudy Setia Laksmana
- Commissioner: Martin Suharlie
- Independent commissioner: Aldo Rambie
- Independent commissioner: Angkie Yudistia
