= Erick Thohir =

Indonesian politician and businessman (born 1970)

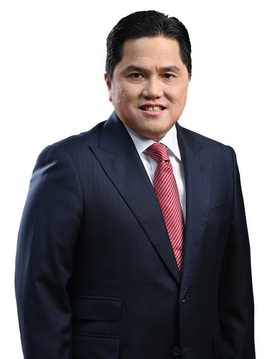
- Official portrait, 2021

15th Minister of Youth and Sports
- Incumbent
- Assumed office 17 September 2025
- President: Prabowo Subianto
- Deputy: Taufik Hidayat
- Preceded by: Dito Ariotedjo

8th Minister of State Owned Enterprises
- In office 23 October 2019 – 17 September 2025
- President: Joko Widodo; Prabowo Subianto
- Preceded by: Rini Soemarno
- Succeeded by: Dony Oskaria (acting)

Chair of the Football Association of Indonesia
- Incumbent
- Assumed office 16 February 2023
- Preceded by: Mochamad Iriawan

Chair of the Basketball Association of Indonesia
- In office 2004–2006
- Preceded by: Sutiyoso
- Succeeded by: Noviantika Nasution

Chairman of Inter Milan
- In office 2013–2018
- Preceded by: Massimo Moratti
- Succeeded by: Steven Zhang

Personal details
- Born: 30 May 1970 (age 56) Jakarta, Indonesia
- Party: Independent
- Spouse: Elizabeth Tjandra (m. 1998)
- Education: Glendale Community College (BA); National University, California (MBA)
- Occupation: Businessman; entrepreneur; philanthropist; politician
- Known for: Chairman of Football Association of Indonesia; Vice President Commissioner of Mahaka Media; Former owner and chairman of Inter Milan; Former owner of D.C. United; Former president director of Visi Media Asia; President of INASGOC; Former president director of ANTV; President Director of Masyarakat Ekonomi Syariah; Co-owner of Persis Solo; Owner of Oxford United

Erick Thohir (born 30 May 1970) is an Indonesian businessman and politician who serving since 2025 as the Minister of Youth and Sports. He previously led Ministry of State-Owned Enterprises from 2019 to 2025.

He has been the chair of Football Association of Indonesia since 2023 and founder of Mahaka Group, a conglomeration that focuses on media, sports and entertainment. He is also the former owner and chair of Italian football giant Inter Milan from 2013 to 2019 and co-owner of the US soccer club D.C. United from 2012 to 2018, Thohir is currently owner of the English League 1 team Oxford United, and the Indonesian Liga 1 team Persis Solo alongside Kaesang Pangarep, youngest son of the former President Joko Widodo. He was also the president director of ANTV television station and the chief of the Indonesian Olympic Committee. In 2019, he became a member of the International Olympic Committee (IOC). Thohir is also currently a member of the FIBA Central Board.

== Early and personal life ==
Thohir was born on 30 May 1970. His father, Mochamad "Teddy" Thohir, was a co-owner of the automotive group Astra International with William Soeryadjaya. His father comes from Gunung Sugih, Central Lampung, and his mother Edna comes from Majalengka, West Java, and is of mixed Chinese and Sundanese ancestry. He has a brother and a sister.

Thohir received his master's degree in 1993 from National University (California), United States.

== Career ==
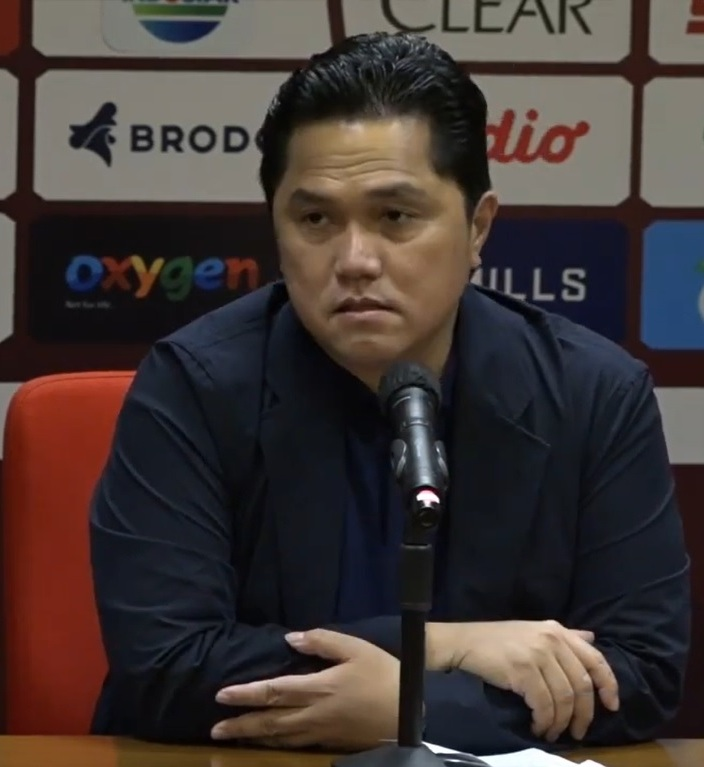
Erick Thohir in PSSI press conference in 2023

Upon his return to Indonesia, together with his colleagues, he formed the Mahaka Group. In 2001, the Mahaka Group bought Republika, the biggest Islamic newspaper in Indonesia. Because of Thohir's background in communications, he was chosen to lead the paper. He received support from his father, as well as founder of Kompas Jakob Oetama and founder of Jawa Pos Dahlan Iskan to run this newspaper. The Mahaka Group spread its potential by investing in the outdoor advertising company Mahaka Advertising due to the growth of the economic and the city size in 2002.

After launching the television station Jak TV, Mahaka introduced the radio stations 98.7 Gen FM and 101 Jak FM, and participated in PT Radionet Cipta Karya (Prambors FM, Delta FM and FeMale Radio), as well as numerous advertising, ticketing, entertainment and digital companies.

Thohir is the founder of Darma Bakti Mahaka Foundation.

In 2011, together with Anindya Bakrie he co-owned the television networks tvOne, as well as the internet news site VIVA.co.id. In 2014, he was involved in a turnaround project and became the President Director of ANTV until 2019.

In 2018, incumbent president Joko Widodo picked Thohir as chief of his re-election campaign for the 2019 presidential election. In 2019, among 10 other individuals Thohir was appointed to the International Olympic Committee.

In February 2023, Thohir was elected as the new chair of the Football Association of Indonesia (PSSI).

In 2024, he continued his role as the Minister of State Owned Enterprises in the cabinet of President Prabowo Subianto. Following a cabinet reshuffle in 2025, he became Minister of Youth and Sports.

== Sports team ownership ==
After negotiations started after the 2011 NBA All-Star Game with former basketball agent Jason Levien and managing owner Josh Harris, Thohir became part of the consortium that bought the Philadelphia 76ers. The consortium included actor Will Smith, his wife Jada Pinkett Smith, David Blitzer of the private equity firm Blackstone Group, and Indonesian businessman Handy Soetedjo. Comcast-Spectacor and Harris began talks in the summer of 2011. The deal was announced on 13 July 2011.

In addition to his business, Thohir also owns the basketball team Satria Muda, and served as an honorary board member of the Indonesian Basketball Association (PERBASI / Persatuan Bola Basket Seluruh Indonesia) from 2015 to 2019. He has been President of SEABA (Southeast Asian Basketball Association) since 2006. He was Chef De Mission of the Indonesia Contingent for the Olympic Games London 2012, and Chairman of the Indonesian Olympic Committee for 2015–2019.

=== Basketball clubs ===
- (United States) Philadelphia 76ers (formerly, until 2013)
- (Indonesia) Satria Muda

=== Football clubs ===
- (United States) D.C. United (formerly, until 2018)
- (Italy) Inter Milan (formerly, until 2019)
- (England) Oxford United (with Anindya Bakrie)
- (Indonesia) Persis Solo (with Kaesang Pangarep)

== Honours ==
- Indonesia:
  - Star of Mahaputera (2nd Class) (Indonesian: Bintang Mahaputera Adipradana) (14 August 2024)

== See also ==
- Mahaka Media
- Jak TV
- 2018 Asian Games
