= Harian Indonesia =

Indonesian Chinese-language newspaper

Harian Indonesia 印度尼西亞日报
- Type: Daily newspaper
- Format: Broadsheet
- Owner: Mahaka Media
- Founded: September 12, 1966
- Language: Chinese
- Headquarters: Jakarta
- Country: Indonesia
- Circulation: 85.000 (?)
- Website: www.harian-indonesia.com/home

Harian Indonesia (Chinese: 印度尼西亞日报, Indonesia Daily) is a Chinese-language newspaper published in Indonesia. The paper is the oldest continuously published Chinese-language newspaper in Indonesia.

== History ==
Harian Indonesia was first published on September 12, 1966, and managed by the Yayasan Indonesia Press (YIP, Indonesia Press Foundation). In 1967 (the beginning of the New Order), there was a ban on all Chinese publications in Indonesia as one of the steps to resolving "Chinese Problems". During the New Order, Harian Indonesia was the only Chinese-language newspaper that was allowed to publish under the supervision of Indonesia's Ministry of Information.

In 2000, the paper was taken over by a new company PT. Emas Indonesia Duaribu. At the end of 2004, the company was acquired by PT. Abdi Bangsa Tbk. (Mahaka Media), thus Harian Indonesia is then under the auspices of Mahaka Media, along with several other media such as Jak TV and Republika newspaper.

On December 1, 2006, Harian Indonesia collaborated with a Malaysian Chinese-language newspaper, Sin Chew Daily. The daily was relaunched as Indonesia - Sin Chew Daily (印尼星洲日报) on January 17, 2007, with editorial management from Sin Chew Daily. However, its Indonesian part of the masthead still bears Harian Indonesia name.

On January 1, 2021, due to business restructuring, Harian Indonesia - Sin Chew Daily became to original name "Harian Indonesia".

== See also ==
- Chinese Indonesians#Media
- List of newspapers in Indonesia
