= Channel X (disambiguation) =

Channel X is a UK comedy and entertainment company.

Channel X may also refer to:

- Channel X, a radio station in Grand Theft Auto V hosted by Keith Morris
- Channel X, a project of Belgian musician Praga Khan
- Channel X Radio, a network of adult contemporary/oldies/full-service formatted American radio stations
- Channel X, a former slogan of KJR-FM in Seattle, Washington, US
- Channel X (New Zealand radio station), classic alternative rock station
- Channel-X (國民英雄), a 2010 Taiwanese TV series

== See also ==
- Television X, a series of adult pay-per-view television channels in the United Kingdom
- X Channel, a name for some radio stations of the X Network in Jakarta, Indonesia
