= Algeria Quran (disambiguation) =

Algeria Quran may refer to:

- Algeria Quran, Algerian Mus'haf
- Algeria Quran Radio, Algerian radio
- Algeria Quran Television, Algerian television
