= Granada (book series) =

Granada is a trilogy by the Egyptian author, Radwa Ashour. The trilogy consists of three novels: Granada, Maryama, and Departure.

The events of the first novel take place upon the fall of the Nasrid Emirate of Granada, the last Islamic kingdom in medieval Iberia. The novel begins with descriptions of Muslim life in Granada, with focus on the work of binding and preserving Islamic educational books. As the Emirate of Granada is conquered by the Catholic Monarchs, Ferdinand and Isabella, and the Spanish Inquisition intensifies, the characters are forced to progressively hide or abandon elements of their life as Muslims. Several characters introduced in Granada inter-marry, and the following novels follow the course of their descendants' lives.

Several editions of the novel were published. The first edition was published by Dar Al-Hilal Publishing in two volumes between 1994 and 1995. The second edition was published by the Arab Institute for Research & Publishing in 1998. The third edition was published by Dar El-Shorouk Publishing in 2001. The fourth edition was a special edition exclusive to Al-Usra Library, and it was published by Dar El-Shorouk in 2004. Finally, the fifth edition was also published by Dar El-Shorouk in 2005.

In 2003, the Arabic PhD at Harvard, William Granara, translated the novel into English. The translation was published by Syracuse University in New York.

== Main characters ==
=== Abu Jaafar ===
He is a calligrapher who owns a shop in Al-Warraqin Neighbourhood and lives in Al-Bayazzin Neighbourhood in Granada. He also owns a house in a place known as “Aynul Dam’i” or “Tear’s Eye.” He is a father to one child, and a grandfather to two, Hassan and Salima, whom he takes care of in his house in Al-Bayazzin Neighbourhood – after the death of their father. Umm Jaafar and Umm Hassan live with them, and Nai’m and Saad work with him in his shop.

=== Umm Jaafar ===
Abu Jaafar's wife, and Hassan and Salima's grandmother.

=== Na’im ===
Works in Abu Jaafar's shop in Al-Warraqin Neighbourhood. A strong friendship forms between him and Saad due to working and living together at the shop. After Abu Jaafar's death, he moves to work at Eskafi's shop, who is a shoemaker.

=== Umm Hassan ===
Abu Jaafar's son's wife, and Hassan and Salima's mother.

=== Saad ===
He used to be a servant for one of the men before he this man gets kicked out by Abu Mansur and humiliates him publicly, in addition to trying to hit him. All of this does not affect Saad; he does not even try and follow this man – his master. After several days, he goes to Abu Mansur who refers him Al-Warraqin Neighbourhood where his friend – Abu Jaafar – will find a job for Saad. After working at Abu Jaafar's shop, a friendship between him and Na’im blossoms. He also married Salima, Abu Jaafar's granddaughter, and after Abu Jaafar's death, goes to work at Abu Mansur's bath.

=== Hassan ===
Abu Jaafar's grandson. He works as a calligrapher like his grandfather, and he marries Maryama.

=== Salima ===
Abu Jaafar's granddaughter and Hassan's sister. She marries Saad.

=== Hisham ===
Hassan and Maryama's son, and he married Aisha.

=== Aisha ===
Salima and Saad's daughter, and she marries Hisham and has Ali.

=== Ali ===
One of the heroes in the novel, and he is Aisha and Hisham's son, and Maryama and Hassan's grandson.

== About The Trilogy ==
Ali Al-Ra'I said that the trilogy allows intense historical events to explode right before the reader's eyes.

Latina Az-Zayat said that the language used in ‘Granada’ is one of memory. This nostalgia is what results in the richness, rhythm, and poetic-ness of the language. This language leads to diversity in both, narration and description.

Jaber Asfour said that ‘Granada’ gives voice to the oppressed where staying alive is heroic in a hostile world which oppresses an entire history.

Sabri Hafiz said that Ashour's trilogy is the first astounding trilogy written by a woman in Arabic fiction, standing alongside Naguib Mahfouz's trilogy.

Farida An-Naqash said that the novel makes the soul shudder.

== Granada ==
Granada is the first novel in the ‘Granada Trilogy,’ and it was published in 1994. The novel received the Best Novel of 1994 Award from Cairo's International Book Expo.

== Maryama ==
Maryama is the second novel in the trilogy, and it was published in the same edition as ‘Departure’ in 1995. Both ‘Granada’ and ‘Departure’ received the first prize of the first Arab Woman Book Expo in Cairo 1995.

== Departure ==
Departure is the third novel in the trilogy. It was published in the same edition as ‘Maryama’ in 1995. Both ‘Granada’ and ‘Departure’ received the first prize of the first Arab Woman Book Expo in Cairo 1995.
