= Celebrities Radio =

PM2FGR
Central Jakarta, Jakarta Province; Indonesia
- Broadcast area: Jabodetabek and surrounding regencies
- Frequency: 106.6 FM
- Branding: 106.6 Celebrities Radio

Programming
- Language: Indonesian
- Format: Top 40/CHR, Infotainment, Jazz

Ownership
- Owner: MNC Radio Networks (via iNews Media Group)
- Operator: PT Radio Sabda Sosok Sohor
- Sister stations: 97.1 RDI, MNC Trijaya 104.6 FM, 88.4 Okezone Radio

History
- First air date: As DMC: unknown As S Radio: mid 1990s As Muara Radio: 1996; As M Radio: December 2001; As V Radio: 14 February 2002 As Celebrities Radio: 1 July 2014
- Last air date: As S Radio: 1996 As Muara Radio: early 2001; As M Radio: December 2001 As V Radio: 30 June 2014

Technical information
- Class: B
- ERP: (estimated) 60 kW
- HAAT: (estimated) 288 m

Links
- Website: http://vradiofm.com

PM2FGR (106.6 FM), on-air name 106.6 Celebrities Radio, is a radio station in Jakarta, Indonesia. Celebrities Radio focuses on 90s music, although 2000s and 2010s songs are also played in weekdays. MNC Networks owns this station.

== History ==
This radio started with DMC Radio branding until mid 1990s. Later, this radio rebranded as S Radio, focusing at celebrity news and infotainment format like 101.1 Showbiz Tsismis in Manila at that time. S Radio's music was similar with Prambors and CHR stations at the time. S Radio was mentioned in Jakarta Undercover 2 book, popular book that revealed Jakarta's nightlife at that time.
Later in 1996, Muara Radio acquired this frequency with its dangdut music format. Muara Radio abandoned this format in 2001, rebranded into 106.6 M Radio (initial of Muara) with no dangdut music. In 2001, MNC Networks acquired the station to replace Women Radio (PM2FGF) that was leased to non-group owner.

=== V Radio Era ===
At the first 6 years, V Radio focused on content for women, hence its tagline "The voice of inspiring woman". Some programs related to women and mothers were held, including talks and off-air activations.
In 2008, V Radio changed its tagline as Lagu Hitsnya Beda due to playlist focus to 80s and 90s song, also started targeting men in its programming. V Radio was the first to reborn slow adult contemporary radio in Jakarta, after Delta FM's re-branding, followed by Kis FM. Unlike its rival Most Radio which played 80s, 90s with some rock, metal and Camajaya with some rock and roll, country, oldies, 00s and 60s-70s, V Radio focused on slow and relaxing music, also plays 2000s and 2010s music on the weekdays.

== Facilities ==
V Radio's office is in MNC Tower, Jl.Kebon Sirih No.17-19, Menteng, Central Jakarta. Its transmitter is possibly in Kebon Jeruk, West Jakarta, sharing the same site with RCTI transmitter. As the result, V Radio possibly has the highest HAAT in Jakarta. Although the transmitter is there, the radio is licensed in East Jakarta due to S Radio's office in that city.

== Slogans ==
=== As DMC Radio Action ===
- Station For The Nation

=== As S Radio ===
- Jakarta Infotainment Station

=== As Muara FM ===
- Jakarta One Stop Dangdut Station

=== As V Radio ===
- The Voice Of Inspiring Women (2002–2007, 2013-2014)
- Lagu Hitsnya Beda (Song Hits Is Different) (2008–2013)

=== As Celebrities Radio ===
- Info Hiburan Terhangat (Hottest Entertainment Information) (2014-)

== Jingles ==
V Radio Using the Jingles from Reelworld since year 2002

- 106,6 V Radio
- Station For Modern Women, V Radio
