= At-Thohir Mosque =

Mosque in Depok, West Java, Indonesia

Coordinates: 6.4273°S 106.8948°E

At-Thohir Mosque مسجد الظهير
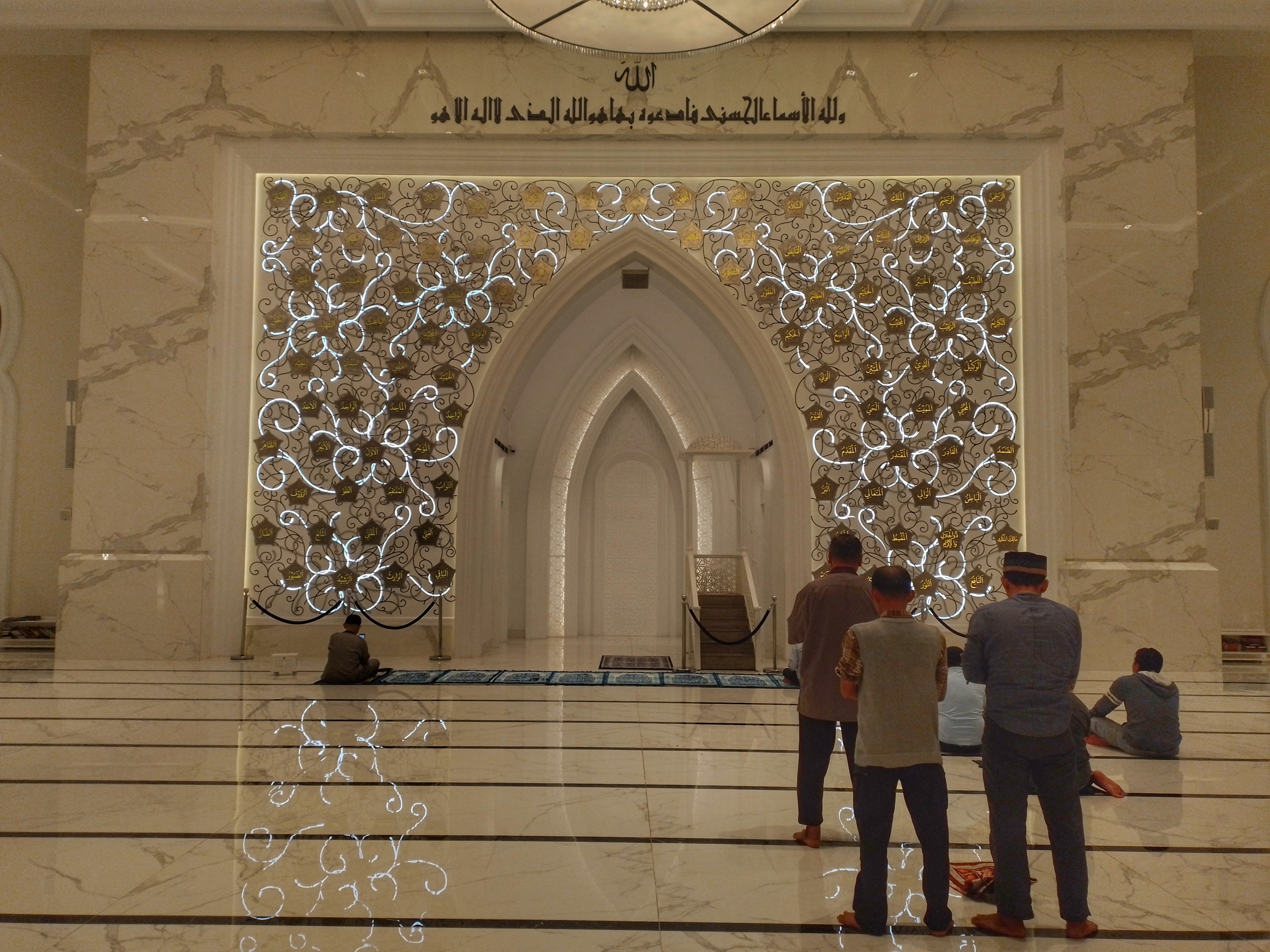

Religion
- Affiliation: Islam
- Branch/tradition: Sunni
- Province: West Java

Location
- Location: Depok
- Country: Indonesia
- Interactive map of At-Thohir Mosque مسجد الظهير

Architecture
- Architect: Erick Thohir
- Type: Mosque
- Style: Middle East
- Established: 2016
- Completed: 2022

Specifications
- Capacity: 1.500
- Dome: 17
- Minaret: 4

At-Thohir Mosque (Arabic: مسجد الظهير), better known as At-Thohir Grand Mosque (Arabic: مسجد الجامع الظهير), is a mosque complex located in the Podomoro Golf View, Depok, West Java Province, Indonesia.

== History ==
This mosque was built in 2016, on the orders of the Mochamad Thohir family, including Erick Thohir and his brother Garibaldi Thohir. The objective was to realize one of the ideals of his father, Teddy, who died on 1 November 2016. The mosque was inaugurated by then-President Joko Widodo on Friday, 9 March 2022.

== Architecture ==
At-Thohir Mosque combines modern style with Middle Eastern nuances. Its large, prominent dome is the main attraction, combined with towering minarets that serve as a symbol of spirituality. The interior of the mosque is decorated with Islamic calligraphy. High-quality materials were used in its construction, ensuring durability as well as charming aesthetics. The courtyard of the mosque is also designed with a beautiful garden, creating a comfortable environment for visitors.
