= 103.4 DFM =

PM2FGP
East Jakarta, DKI Jakarta; Indonesia
- Broadcast area: Jabodetabek and some surrounding regencies
- Frequency: 103.4 MHz
- Branding: "103.4 DFM"

Programming
- Language: Indonesian
- Format: Contemporary Hit Radio
- Affiliations: Soeharto family

Ownership
- Owner: PT Radio Taman Mini

History
- Former frequencies: 105.8 FM (now used by Most Radio)

Technical information
- Class: A

PM2FGP (103.4 FM), on air name 103.4 DFM, is a radio station in Jakarta. Currently, Tutut Soeharto (daughter of former Indonesian president Soeharto) owns this station. This station mainly plays today's pop music along with 90s music.

== History ==
=== Terminal Musik Indonesia ===
PM2FGP started in late 1980s as "Terminal Musik Indonesia" (TMI), hence its company name. The station only played Indonesian pop music, also the first station to embrace this format. TMI ceased broadcast after 1998 riot, demolishing the studio in Pasar Minggu subdistrict. Later in 2000, the "100% Indonesian song" format was inherited to I-Radio until today.

=== Business Radio ===
PM2FGP returned in early 2000s era as D FM, that time reformatted into business radio same as 103.8 Brava Radio and 95.9 Smart FM today. Motivational program and business talks were part of DFM's content, along with some news breaks. DFM surrendered this format in 2015, flipped itself into a contemporary hit radio just like rivals Prambors and Mustang 88.0 with some 90s music inserted.
