= 105.8 FM =

Radio broadcasting frequency

This is a list of radio stations that broadcast on FM frequency 105.8 MHz:

== China ==
- CNR The Voice of China in Haikou

== Indonesia ==
- Most Radio 105.8 FM

== United Kingdom ==
- Greatest Hits Radio London
- Greatest Radio Dorset
- U105
