= Tahar Ouettar =

Algerian writer

Tahar Ouettar (Arabic: الطاهر وطار; 1936 – August 12, 2010) was an Algerian writer. Ouettar was called "one of the North African nation’s most prolific Arabic language authors".

Born into a Berber family in Sedrata, he was a supporter of arabization in the wake of Algerian independence. The essence of his project, he once said, was to “liberate Algerian identity to make it Arab-Berber-Islamic.” He denounced Algeria's French-language writers as "vestiges of colonialism". Ouettar published his first novel "Al Laz" in 1974. While steadfast in his assault on francophone writers, he defended the use of the Berber language. It was he who founded the Algeria Quran Radio on July 12, 1991.

== In English ==
- The Earthquake, trans. by William Granara, Saqi Books (2000) ISBN 0-86356-339-2
