= Radio Ramadan =

Islamic radio station based in the United Kingdom

Radio Ramadan is a type of Islamic radio which was operating exclusively during the Ramadan period in the UK. Many cities that have significant Muslim populations individually fund these stations and they run a number of broadcasts including Quran recitation and Nasheeds.

The Radio Ramadan stations currently operating in the UK in Ramadan include:

- Ramadan Radio Leicester (87.9FM)
- Ramadan Radio London (87.9FM)
- In 2023, It started operating during the whole year.
