= Radio Algeria =

Algerian Radio

Algerian Radio Radio Algérienne المؤسسة العمومية للبث الإذاعي
- Type: Public-service sound broadcasting
- Country: Algeria
- Broadcast area: National, MENA and International
- Headquarters: Algiers

Ownership
- Owner: Government of Algeria

History
- Launch date: 1986; 40 years ago

Coverage
- Stations: See below

Links
- Website: www.radioalgerie.dz

The Entreprise nationale de radiodiffusion sonore (ENRS, the National Sound Broadcasting Company, Algerian Radio, or Radio Algérienne; in Arabic: المؤسسة العمومية للبث الإذاعي) is Algeria's state-owned public radio broadcasting organisation. The group provides services in Arabic, French and Berber and currently operates six national stations and one international plus a network of regional stations.

The ENRS is a member of the European Broadcasting Union.

== History ==
Formed in 1986 when the previous Algerian Radio and Television company (established in 1962) was split into four enterprises. The origins of Algerian radio go back to the clandestine station that the National Liberation Front launched in December 1956, and which was active during the war of independence. At its conclusion in 1962, Algeria became independent from France and the transitional government nationalized the media to form a new company, Radiodiffusion-télévision algérienne (RTA), which took over the functions of the old Radiodiffusion-Télévision Française (RTF) on October 28, 1962. then with three radio stations and a television channel. Three years later it expanded its coverage throughout the national territory.

Algerian Radio became a public industrial and commercial establishment (EPIC) by executive decree no. 91-102 of April 20, 1991. A specification defining the missions of Algerian radio was also published in April 1991.

== Services ==
- Alger Chaîne 1, generalist station in Arabic
- Alger Chaîne 2, generalist station in Berber
- Alger Chaîne 3, generalist station in French
- Algeria Quran Radio, station dedicated to reading the Quran in Arabic, Berber and French.
- Cultural Radio, cultural radio station in Arabic.
- Jil FM, youth music station in Arabic, Berber and French.
- Zaman FM, thematic station dedicated to songs, musical and theatrical heritage

There is also one international station, Radio Algérie Internationale, broadcasting in four languages (Arabic, French, Spanish and English) on shortwave via the relay station in Issoudun, France, and a large network of local stations (Radio Adrar, Radio El Bahia, Radio Biskra, Radio Blida, Radio Soummam, etc.).

== See also ==
- Entreprise nationale de télévision (Algerian state television)
- Mass media in Algeria
