= Algeria Quran Radio =

Islamic radio station in Algeria

Coordinates: 36.7311159°N 3.0956864°E

Algiers; Algeria
- Frequencies: 100.5 MHz and 105.1 MHz

Programming
- Languages: Arabic, Berber, French
- Format: Islamic radio
- Network: Radio Algeria
- Affiliations: Ministry of Communication in Algeria

Ownership
- Owner: Aïssa Hamdi

History
- Founded: 12 July 1991

Links
- Webcast: Algeria Quran Radio Live
- Website: www.radioalgerie.dz/coran/

Algeria Quran Radio is an Algerian Islamic radio channel.

== Broadcast ==
Affiliated with Radio Algeria, this Islamic radio began broadcasting on 12 July 1991 on medium waves (MW), with an hourly rate of daily broadcasting of only six hours a day, from 05:00 AM until 11:00 AM.

The foundation of this radio station was made when the writer and novelist Tahar Ouettar was the director general of the Algerian national radio stations.

This radio continued to broadcast in this manner until 6 March 1992, when it began to produce and diversify the panel and range of its broadcasts.

Quran Radio has nevertheless experienced fluctuations in the hours of its broadcast since its creation until 5 July 2008, when the hourly rate of its broadcasts stabilized for ten hours a day divided into two periods.

Since 2008, the morning time slot of its broadcast thus extended over a period of two hours, going from midnight 0:00 a.m. until 2:00 a.m., while the second period extended from 5:00 a.m. from morning until 1:00 p.m.

The two-hour period extending from 5:00 a.m. to 7:00 a.m. was devoted to the countries of the African Sahel on medium waves, and it will be rebroadcast in the same night on shortwaves, and this from 8:00 p.m. until 10:00 p.m.

The diffusion of Quran Radio was extended on 18 February 2021 to broadcast its broadcasts over a continuous 24-hour period.

== Directors ==
- Mohamed Zoubda
- Aïssa Hamdi

== See also ==
- Radio Algeria
- Islamic radio
