= William Granara =

American author and translator

- Education: Georgetown (BA) University of Pennsylvania (PhD)
- Occupations: Author, professor, and Arabic-English translator
- Website: https://cmes.fas.harvard.edu/people/william-granara

William Granara is an American author, translator and scholar of Arabic language and literature. He is Italian American.

== Education ==
Granara completed his undergraduate studies at Georgetown University in French literature. Granara has said that he chose Arabic as his second foreign language, and after reading The Stranger by Albert Camus, influenced his decision to transition to research on the Arab world. Later, Granara attended the University of Pennsylvania, obtaining his PhD in Arabic and Islamic studies. Granara has cited his former UPenn professor of medieval Islamic studies, George Makdisi, as influential on his work.

== Career ==
Granara has worked for the American University in Cairo and for the U.S. State Department in Tunis. In 1993, he started working as an Arabic professor at Harvard University. Since then, he has taught courses on Arabic language and comparative Middle Eastern literature. He was the director of the Arabic language program at Harvard.

Granara is an expert on the history of Muslim Sicily, and on the Sicilian Arab poet Ibn Hamdis. His ethnicity, Italian-American, influenced his interest in the Italian island of Sicily. He has also contributed to a volume entitled The Architecture and Memory of the Minority Quarter in the Muslim Mediterranean City.

Among his Arabic-English translations are:

- The Earthquake by Tahir Wattar
- Granada by Radwa Ashour
- The Battle of Poitiers by Jurji Zaydan

Granara's work has appeared in Banipal magazine.

Granara is a member of the board of trustees at The American College of the Mediterranean (ACM), an American-style degree-granting institution in Aix-en-Provence, France which includes a study abroad institute for American undergraduate students, IAU College.

In 2011, Granara wrote an Op-ed for The Harvard Crimson detailing his time in Cairo in 1973.

== See also ==
- List of Arabic-English translators
- An Interview with Dr. Granara
- Op-ed by Granara
