= Z99.9 FM =

PM2FAS
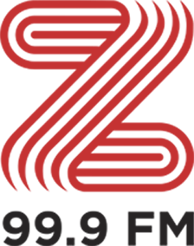

Indonesia
- Frequency: 99.9 MHz
- RDS: Z99.9FM
- Branding: Z 99.9

Programming
- Language: Indonesian, English (occasional)
- Format: Contemporary hit radio/Top 40

Ownership
- Owner: MPG Media Network
- Sister stations: 99.5 Smooth FM

History
- First air date: May 2016 (as Virgin Radio Jakarta); January 2021 (as Z99.9FM
- Last air date: November 26, 2020, (replaced by Z99.9FM)
- Former frequencies: 88.3 FM

Technical information
- Class: A

Links
- Website: z999fm.com

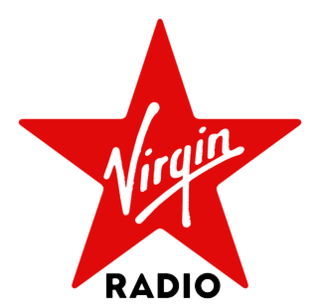
Previous logo as Virgin Radio Jakarta

Z99.9FM is an Indonesian radio station owned by the MPG Media Network serving Jakarta. It was previously aired as Virgin Radio Jakarta from May 2016 to 2020s.

== History ==
In May 2016, Virgin Radio started with only one jockey named Vari (from Oz Radio). And then in late June 2016, it added one more jockey named Stefany. Not long after that in late 2016, Virgin Radio held a DJ audition, and added one more jockey named Canti. Advertisement kept running in prime time hours (6am-10am), together with its sister station Smooth FM.

In 2017, Virgin Radio Jakarta introduced its morning show named Breakfast Show with Vari and Canti as host, later Jerome replaced Canti in 2018, and in 2019 Canti was replaced by David. There are also other programs; Virgin Radio Music Morning with Talitha, Virgin Radio Rush Hour with Aleef, Virgin Radio Hot Hits with Bukie, and New Song Sunday with Stefany.

On 26 November 2020, Virgin Radio Jakarta re-branded as Z 99.9
