= Republika (Indonesian newspaper) =

Indonesian daily newspaper published in Jakarta

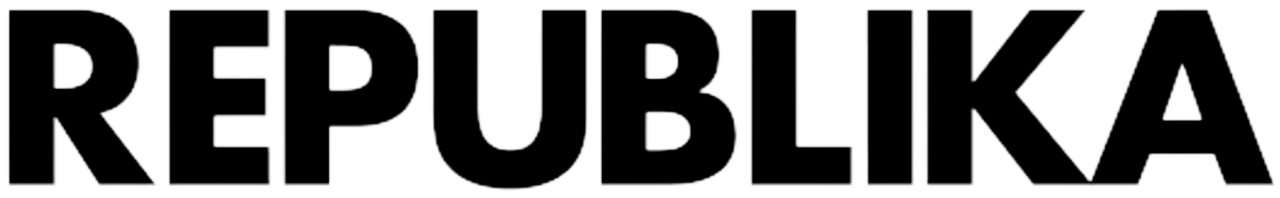

- Republika headquarters
- Type: Daily digital newspaper
- Owner: Mahaka X
- Editor-in-chief: Irfan Junaidi
- Associate editor: Subroto
- News editor: Elba Damhuri
- Founded: 4 January 1993
- Ceased publication: 31 December 2022 (print)
- Language: Indonesian
- Headquarters: Jalan Warung Buncit Raya 37, South Jakarta
- City: Jakarta
- Country: Indonesia
- Circulation: 20,000 (2021)
- Website: www.republika.id www.republika.co.id (news portal)

Former logo of Republika Online

Republika is an online Indonesian national daily newspaper. The newspaper was known, and described itself, as a publication for the Muslim community. In 1994, the paper created its own news portal, which is one of the first of its kind in Indonesia. It ceased publication in December 2022 and transitioned to online.

== History ==
Republika was founded in 1992 and the first edition was published on January 4, 1993, by Yayasan Abdi Bangsa, a foundation supported by Ikatan Cendekiawan Muslim Indonesia (ICMI), which at the time was chaired by B. J. Habibie (1936–2019). After B. J. Habibie ceased being president in 1999, and in line with declining of the ICMI's political role, the majority of ownership was taken by Mahaka Media in late 2000. Republika then was published by PT Republika Media Mandiri and has become a general Indonesian newspaper.

== Slogan history ==
- Koran Masyarakat Baru (1993-1997)
- Lebih Khas, Semakin Cerdas (1997-2002)
- Akrab & Cerdas (2002-2022)
