= JakTV =

Regional private TV station in Jakarta

- Jakarta metropolitan area; Indonesia
- City: South Jakarta
- Channels: Digital: 34 (UHF), shared with tvOne Jakarta; Virtual: 115

Programming
- Affiliations: Independent

Ownership
- Owner: Mahaka Media

History
- First air date: 16 March 2005
- Former channel number: 55 UHF (analog)
- Former affiliations: City TV Network (2005–2014)

Technical information
- Licensing authority: Ministry of Communication and Information Technology
- ERP: 390 kW
- HAAT: 285 m (935 ft)

Links
- Website: jak-tv.com

Jak TV is an Indonesian capital regional free-to-air television channel broadcasting from the Jabodetabek area. It is owned by Mahaka Media and launched on 31 October 2004.

JakTV's programming is focused towards news, magazines and soft news. As of August 2018, JakTV extended its broadcasting into 24 hours airtime, and added a new slogan "Dari Jakarta Untuk Indonesia" (From Jakarta to Indonesia).

== History ==
In 2016, Jak TV broadcast Serie A football matches for two seasons (2016–17 and 2017–18).

In 2017, Jak TV covers both Inter Milan's International Champions Cup Singapore matches.

In 2019, Jak TV broadcast selected live and most delayed Premier League matches for three seasons (2019-20 until 2021–22), plus highlights. Jak TV also broadcast four live games (both semi finals and both gold-bronze finals) of the 2019 FIBA World Cup in-simulcast with the national public broadcaster TVRI.

== Controversies ==
=== Obstruction of justice case ===
On 22 April 2025, the Attorney General's Office of Indonesia announced that the news director of Jak TV, Tian Bahtiar, received IDR 487 million from two advocates, Marcella Santoso and Junaedi Saibih, in order to fabricate and spread negative news against the institution. One narration, contains a misleading number of state losses. They also allegedly funded protests, seminaries, podcasts, and talkshows on digital media, to thwart the Office's investigation attempts. All of these event were spread through Jak TV's social media. All three of them have been named as obstruction of justice suspects.

The controversy garnered various reactions. Through its chairwoman Ninik Rahayu, the Press Council requested to divert the investigation from Attorney General's Office. Association of Indonesian Local TV Stations respected for its legal process and reaffirmed its commitment to press freedom, while appealing for presumption of innocence. Expert on criminal law at Trisakti University, Abdul Fickar Hadjar viewed it as "exaggerated" and the naming of suspects did not follow the right of reply according to the Press Law.

=== Broadcast signal hijacking in the Jakarta multiplexing area ===
On June 1, 2026, at approximately 8:30 WIB, the broadcast signal from this television station was affected by a hijacking by an unknown party. The hijacker replaced the broadcast material that was being broadcast with other broadcast material in the form of screenshots from a YouTube channel with the username @GrimPlaysStuff which were placed randomly all over the screen, as well as a video containing pornographic acts which was placed in the middle of the screen. This incident sparked various reactions and criticism from the public on various social media platforms. The @GrimPlaysStuff username was previously linked to hijackings of several radio stations in the United States, in which offensive songs were also played.

On the same day, at around 11.00 WIB, Jak TV via its Instagram account issued an official statement stating that there had been interference with their broadcast signal, and the broadcast material shown at the time of the incident was not part of Jak TV's official broadcast. They also stated that their team was conducting an investigation regarding this incident.
