= Jak 101 FM =

PM2FGG
- Central Jakarta, DKI Jakarta; Indonesia
- Broadcast area: Jabodetabek metropolitan area, Karawang, Serang, Purwakarta, West Bandung Regency, parts of Lebak
- Frequency: 101.0 MHz
- Branding: Jak 101 FM

Programming
- Language: Indonesian
- Format: Adult contemporary radio
- Affiliations: Erick Thohir

Ownership
- Owner: Mahaka Radio Integra (MARI)
- Operator: Mahaka Group (2000–present) through PT Radio Suara Irama Indah
- Sister stations: Gen 98.7 FM, Hot 93.2 FM, Mustang 88.0 FM, Kis 95.1 FM, Most Radio 105.8 FM

History
- First air date: around late 1970s (possibly 1976), as Jak FM: 2000
- Former frequencies: 101.25 FM

Technical information
- Class: B
- Power: 10 kW

Links
- Website: jak101fm.com

PM2FGG (101.0 FM), on-air name Jak 101 FM or Jak FM, is an adult contemporary radio station in Jakarta, Indonesia. In 2001, Jak FM held a 6% radio market share. The radio company, PT Suara Irama Indah, was the first commercial FM radio station in the country.

== History ==
=== Suara Irama Indah era ===
After Elshinta Radio was bought (possibly by Salim Group) in the late 1970s, Soejoso Karsono created Radio Suara Irama Indah. Sudibyo Karsono also contributed to Irama Indah radio. Later the radio changed into B-FM and Radio One in the late 1990s.

=== Jak FM ===
Jak FM changed the branding only on 18 September 2000 and launched from 10 January 2001 to the present. To cater to youngsters and more varied listeners, Jak FM later added new music, mostly Western music. Jak FM slowly reduced classic hits (now on Most Radio 105.8 FM) and added new announcers, including morning show DJ Ronal Surapradja and Tike Prie.

== Programming ==
Jak FM operates for 18 hours (06.00 (all time in UTC+7)-00.00) . Outside operating hours, Jak FM plays automated music. Daily programs include:

- Sarapan Seru (Kamal & Sahil)
- Jak Best Music (various announcers)
- Joki 3 In 1 (Molan, Gita)
