= Islamic radio =

Media in Islam

Islamic radio is a category of radio formats that focus on transmitting programming with an Islamic message. Radio stations can be public, private and non-profit (or some form of Community radio).

These radio stations typically focus on Islamic religious programming, such as reading of the Quran, talk radio-style programming (sometimes including live radio call-in shows), or long-form "preaching and teaching" programs with news programming with associated topics that can have an economic or a political angle to Muslim community. In recent years during Ramadan, many UK cities with Muslim populations have set up Radio Ramadan stations that operate exclusively during Ramadan. These stations feature a variety of broadcasts including Quran recitation and Islamic music known as Nasheeds.

Many secular radio stations devote some of their weekend programming to religious programming; for example, during Friday prayers or Eid Mubarak, Ramadan.

== See also ==
- Islam
- Religious Broadcasting
- Christian radio
