= Gen 98.7 FM =

PM2FGU
Central Jakarta, Jakarta; Indonesia
- Broadcast area: Jabodetabek (Greater Jakarta), Karawang, Serang, parts of Lebak, Purwakarta, and West Bandung Regency
- Frequencies: 98.8 MHz (1988–2004); 98.7 MHz (2004-present
- RDS: GEN987FM or Gen FM (Automatic tune to switched by radio frequency and go to 98.7 FM the RDS is called GEN987FM or Gen FM)
- Branding: Gen 98.7 FM

Programming
- Format: Top 40 (CHR)

Ownership
- Owner: Universitas Islam Attahiriyah (1989–2007); Mahaka Radio Integra (MARI) (2007–present)
- Sister stations: Most Radio, Kis FM, Jak FM, Mustang FM, Hot FM

History
- First air date: 1989-2007 (as Attahiriyah FMuslim), 2007 (as Gen FM)

Technical information
- Class: A

Links
- Website: gen987fm.com

PM2FGU, on-air name Gen FM or Gen 98.7 FM, is a contemporary hit radio in Jakarta. Gen FM plays around 80% Western Top 40 music and 20% Indonesian Top 40 music.

== History ==
The 98.7 FM frequency in Jakarta used to be an Islamic radio station called Er Radio or FMuslim. The channel was popular for Quran recital via phone call. In 2000, the frequency became vacant in Jakarta. In the same year, Mahaka Radio Integra (MARI) acquired the station after the rebranding of Radio One Jakarta into 101 Jak FM.

The format pushed International Top 40 songs, creating rivalry to 88.0 Mustang FM, all 80% International song radio, and peaking the radio station ranking. New programming and professional DJ recruiting, especially DJs from 2000's, helping Gen FM's way into number 1 radio in Jakarta.

== Network ==
Gen FM has a network in Surabaya, called Gen 103.1 FM Surabaya (PM6FKC). No relayed programs from Gen FM Jakarta in Gen FM Surabaya.
