= Hot 93.2 FM =

PM2FAW
East Jakarta, Jakarta Province; Indonesia
- Broadcast area: Jabodetabek and parts of surrounding regencies (Karawang, Serang, Lebak)
- Branding: Hot 93.2 FM

Programming
- Language: Indonesian
- Format: Dangdut

Ownership
- Owner: Mahaka Radio Integra
- Sister stations: Gen 98.7 FM, Jak 101 FM, Mustang 88 FM, Kis 95.1 FM, Most Radio 105.8 FM

History
- First air date: As 93.2 MD Radio: circa 2004 As Hot 93.2 FM: December 16, 2016
- Last air date: As 93.2 MD Radio: April 4, 2014

Technical information
- Class: A
- ERP: 10 kW

Links
- Website: hot932fm.com

PM2FAW (93.2 FM), broadcasts as Hot 93.2 FM or Hot FM, is a radio station in Jakarta, Indonesia. It broadcasts dangdut music, along with a few Melayu pop songs.

== History ==
Before 93.2 FM was acquired by Mahaka, it was occupied by MD Radio. MD Radio was the successor of Suara Kejayaan (SK/Sentra Komedi) that was forced to move from 101.6 FM to 93.2 FM at that time.
MD Radio broadcast in contemporary hit radio format like Gen 98.7 FM. MD Radio ceased broadcast in April 2014 and reported to be leased. But MD Radio kept playing non-stop music until early 2016. Mahaka started test broadcast of Hot FM in September 2016, using "Radio 93.2 FM" or "93.2 FM" branding. Dangdut music starts playing at that time, until today. In October, some DJs were reported to fill on-air slots.
