= Mustang 88 FM =

Indonesian commercial radio network

PM2FHF
- South Jakarta, Special Jakarta Capital Region; Indonesia
- Broadcast area: Jabodetabek (Greater Jakarta), Karawang, Serang
- Frequencies: 100.5 MHz (1983–2004); 88.0 MHz (2004–present)
- RDS: MUSTANG_88FM
- Branding: Mustang 88.0 FM

Programming
- Format: Top 40 (CHR)

Ownership
- Owner: Mahaka Radio Integra (MARI)
- Sister stations: Most Radio, Kis FM, Jak FM, Gen FM, Hot FM

History
- First air date: 1987
- Former call signs: PM3FHF (1987-unknown)

Technical information
- Class: A

Links
- Website: mustang88fm.com

PM2FHF (old call sign: PM3FHF, 88.0 FM), on-air name Mustang FM or Mustang 88.0 FM, is a commercial contemporary hit radio in Jakarta. Mahaka Radio Integra (MARI) owns 100% share of this radio station has the rest. Mustang 88.0 FM plays around all full Top 40 music along with 101.4 TraxFM & 102.2 Prambors.

== History ==
The radio starts back on 1 September 2000, nearly at the same time with discontinued Ramako now Most Radio). Since it was found, the station focuses on young audience as main listeners. On August 1, 2004, Radio Mustang moved its frequency from 100.55 FM to 88.0 FM in line with the government's restructuring of all radio frequencies. some programs were consistent until the MARI acquisition in September 2008.

The station belongs to Ramako Group before acquired in 2008 along with its siblings 95.1 KIS FM and 105.8 Lite FM. After this acquisition, Ramako only has 2 stations that are fully owned by them: 101.6 Zoo FM and 100.7 Batam FM, both in Batam Island.
