= Kis FM =

PM2FHN
Central Jakarta, Special Jakarta Capital Region; Indonesia
- Broadcast area: Jabodetabek (Greater Jakarta), Karawang, Serang, parts of Lebak, Purwakarta, and West Bandung Regency
- Frequency: 95.1 MHz
- Branding: Kis 95.1 FM

Programming
- Format: Adult contemporary, '90s hits

Ownership
- Owner: Mahaka Radio Integra (MARI)
- Sister stations: Most Radio, Gen FM, Jak FM, Mustang FM, Hot FM

History
- First air date: 1991

Technical information
- Class: A

Links
- Website: kis951fm.com

PM2FHN (old call sign: PM3FHN, 95.1 FM), on air name Kis FM, is a Jakarta radio station. It features slow adult contemporary. The channel is owned by Mahaka Radio Integra (MARI). Kis FM targets youth.

== History ==
Kis FM started in Gandul, Cinere, Bogor (now part of Depok) in 1991. It is the youngest of Ramako group radio stations. Since its creation in 1991, it targeted young adults with consistent programming from the 1990s to its 2000 acquisition by MARI.

On August 1, 2004 Kis Radio, moved its frequency from 107.2 FM to 95.1 FM in line with the government's rearrangement of all radio frequencies.

In June 2011, Kis FM old program like Wednesday Slow Machine return as Kis Love Machine on Friday, Rock Weekend program now on Most Radio every Saturday.

== Slogans ==
- The Intelligent Choice (1992–2000)
- Jakarta's Best Mix (2000–2008)
- Sounds Of The Youth (2009–present)
