= Most Radio 105.8 FM =

Indonesian radio station playing 80s pop and rock music

PM2FGI
- Logo used since 2023
- Jakarta; Indonesia
- Broadcast area: Jabotabek and its surroundings
- Frequency: 105.8 MHz
- RDS: MOST105.8_RADIO
- Branding: Most 105.8

Programming
- Format: Classic hits, AOR, Classic alternative

Ownership
- Owner: Mahaka Radio Integra (MARI) (70% share)
- Sister stations: Jak 101 FM; Gen 98.7 FM; Hot 93.2 FM; Mustang 88.0 FM; Kis 95.1 FM

History
- First air date: April 3, 1983; 42 years ago (as Ramako); October 10, 2008; 17 years ago (as Most Radio)
- Former frequencies: 738 AM (1983–1985); 106.15 FM (1985–2004)

Technical information
- Class: B

Links
- Website: most1058fm.com

PM2FGI (105.8 FM), broadcasting as Most 105.8 or simply Most, is an Indonesian radio station broadcasting from Jakarta. It is owned and operated by Mahaka X under its radio arm Mahaka Radio Integra, and airs a Classic hits format.

== History ==
Inaugurated on April 3, 1983, morning as Radio Ramako on 738 AM, it was located in Jl. Keamanan No.39, Jakarta. On 27 November 1985, it began its broadcast on FM via 106.15, and moved its headquarters to Jl. Empu Sendok No.12, Kebayoran Baru. (Later become Broadcasting Center) In 1993, it moved to BTN Tower 19th floor. The audio after the move became softer, so listeners can hear the music softer. On April 3, 2001, it was relaunched as an interactive radio within a new image, “Listen and Talk to Magic”.

In June 2011, Most Radio started a new program called Rock Weekend, playing only classic rock music every Saturday. It was previously aired on Kis FM.

Most Radio main rivals are Camajaya, Brava, Indika, Smooth, Music City, RPK (80s and 90s), MNC Trijaya and Sonora (Rock and metal)

== Announcers ==
- Arlingga Panega
- Dika Pramunegara
- Ferniza Putri
- Iwan Purwanto
- Bismo Putranto

== Programming ==
=== Current Programmeing ===
All time in WIB/UTC+7.
Most Radio broadcasts 24 hours. Most Radio plays automated music out of on-air time. Daily programs include:

- 07.00-10.00: Prime Time
- 11.00-15.00: Daily News
- 16.00-20.00: Drive Time
- 06-00-24.00: Rock Weekend
- 06-00-24.00: Sundaze

=== Former Programming ===
- Leisure with Magic: a leisure programme
- Ramadan with Magic: a spiritual sharing with Siwo Agus Hidayat (2002–2003)
- Magic Spirit: discussion dialogue
- Berproses Menuju Kesejatian Diri: a sharing programme
- Morning Fresh with Magic: a morning programme
- Postcard from Melbourne: a cooperation program with Australia's ABC radio, the package contains information ABC news for 10 minutes with an interactive discussion with fellow ABC radio announcers from Down Under.
- Cruising with Magic: free Lite programmes
- Magic After Hours: an evening programme
- Magic's Corner: Dialogue about success story
- Magic at Nite: nightly programme
- Magic is Beautiful: an interactive talk show with Arvan Pradiansyah.
- StarMagic: a special programme that plays an Indonesian language songs and share with the soloist, Interview, Music Group, which is promoting the latest album, by SMS Interactive Cassette & CD Album dealers.
- Movie HighLITE: for information about movies.
- Weekend Spot Lite: weekend programmes.
