= Agnez Mo discography =

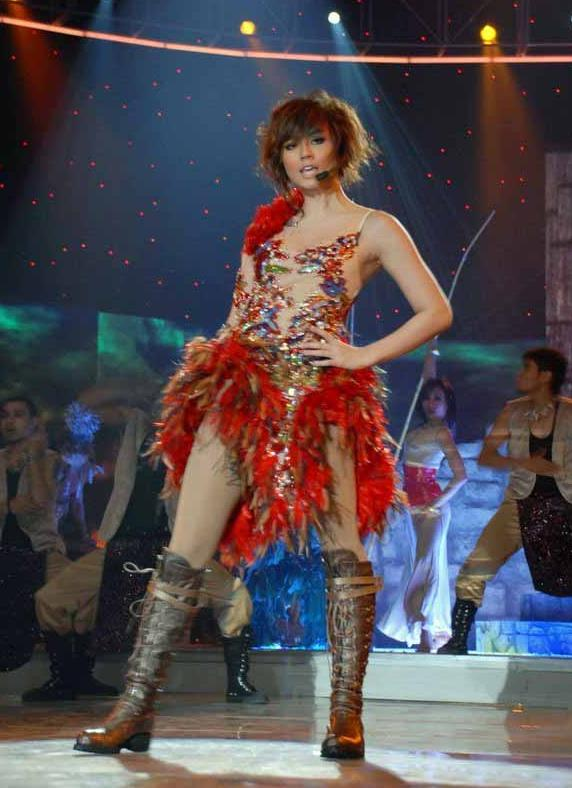
- Mo as a guest star on Asian Idol in 2007.
- Studio albums: 5
- Soundtrack albums: 2
- Compilation albums: 5
- Singles: 42
- Music videos: 41
- Featured singles: 7

Indonesian pop singer Agnez Mo has released five studio albums, one greatest hits album and five compilation albums. Agnez signed a recording contract with MM Records (Mersudi Perwira Musika) in 1994 and released her debut children pop studio album Si Meong. Unfortunately, her album was unsuccessful in the local market. In 1995, she moved and signed a recording contract with Musica Studios and released her duet album and also her second children pop studio album Yess! which saw success in the same market. She released her third children pop studio album Bala-Bala (1998) with Viva Music/Paragon Record (also known as Selecta Records). This was her last album as a child singer.

Agnez signed a record deal with Indonesian second biggest record label Aquarius Musikindo and released her debut studio album And the Story Goes (2003), which saw her transition from child star into a more adult singer. The single "Bukan Milikmu Lagi" reached number one as Highest Debut and reached four weeks as Longest Stay in the MTV Ampuh. The album has sold more than 300.000 copies and certified double platinum album on Indonesia. Followed by the debut, she released her second studio album Whaddup A.. '?! (2005), which birthed her popular slogan, "go international", and saw her collaborating with American singer-songwriter Keith Martin. The album was certified triple platinum album in Indonesia for album sales figures which reached more than 450.000 copies. Her third studio album Sacredly Agnezious (2009) featured the single "Matahariku", which had its ringback tone sales reaching more than three million within nine months of its release. The music video has also been watched more than 4.5 million times on YouTube and became one of her most watched music videos ever. Agnez released her first greatest hits album Agnes Is My Name (2011) and produced two singles "Karena Ku Sanggup" and "Paralyzed". The album was released in cooperation with the American fastfood chain KFC and was released in KFC stores throughout Indonesia. The greatest hits album was estimated having sales figures for 1.000.000 copies and has been certified multi-platinum.

Since the changing of her stage name, from Agnes Monica to AGNEZ MO, she has released two more studio albums entirely written and recorded in English language. Her first-English language album Agnez Mo was released on 1 June 2013 under a record label Entertainment Inc. The self-titled album secured a deal with both local convenience store Indomaret and the coffee brand Kopi Kapal Api and was released exclusively for the Indonesian market in digital and physical forms. First single "Walk" was released on the same date with its music video sponsored by cellular brand simPATI and peaked at number one on the Rolling Stone Indonesia music chart. On 30 June 2013, Agnez premiered her first international single "Coke Bottle" at the Palace Hotel, San Francisco with American rapper and producer Timbaland and T.I. The song was released as a digital single on 8 April 2014 by The Cherry Party, which was owned by Sony Music Entertainment.

In late 2015, Agnez released an extended play for "Boy Magnet", with five remixes by DJ Hector Fonseca, Tommy Love, Xavi Alvaro and John Dish. In late 2016, Agnez released "Sebuah Rasa", her first Indonesian single since her foray into international market. The song peaked at number 1 on iTunes Chart Indonesia. On 10 October 2017 she released her international debut (and second overall) English album called X produced by Danja. In July 2018, Agnez released her collaboration with American singer Chris Brown for a song titled "Overdose".

== Albums ==
=== Studio albums ===
Title	Album details
And the Story Goes	Released: 8 October 2003; Label: Aquarius Musikindo; Formats: CD, cassette
Whaddup A.. '?!	Released: 10 December 2005; Label: Aquarius Musikindo; Formats: CD, cassette
Sacredly Agnezious	Released: 1 April 2009; Label: Aquarius Musikindo; Formats: CD, cassette
Agnez Mo	Released: 1 June 2013; Label: Entertainment Inc, Momentum Music; Formats: CD
X	Released: 10 October 2017; Label: PT. SA Management, Entertainment Inc; Formats: digital download

=== Greatest hits albums ===
Title	Album details
Agnes Is My Name	Released: 2 February 2011; Label: Aquarius Musikindo; Formats: CD

=== Compilation albums ===
Title	Album details
Love Theme	Released: 3 September 2001; Label: Aquarius Musikindo; Formats: CD
Harmoni Alam, Cinta & Kedamaian	Released: 11 May 2011; Label: Royal Prima Musik Indonesia; Formats: CD
Damai Bersamamu	Released: 5 December 2011; Label: Swara Sangkar Emas; Formats: CD
Song To Remember	Released: 3 January 2013; Label: Aquarius Musikindo; Formats: CD, digital download
KFC Adu Bintang	Released: 14 January 2013; Label: Swara Sangkar Emas, Music Factory Indonesia; Formats: CD, digital download

== Singles ==
=== As lead artist ===
Title	Year	Album
"Si Meong"	1992	Si Meong
"Yess!" (feat. Eza Yayang)	1995	Yess!
"Bala-Bala"	1998	Bala-Bala
"Tralala-Trilili"	1998	Ost. Tralala-Trilili
"Mr. Hologram"	1999	Ost. Mr. Hologram
"Pernikahan Dini"	2001	Love Theme
"Seputih Hati"	2001	Love Theme
"Bilang Saja"	2003	And the Story Goes
"Indah"	2003	And the Story Goes
"Cinta Mati" (feat. Ahmad Dhani)	2004	And the Story Goes
"Jera"	2004	And the Story Goes
"Bukan Milikmu Lagi"	2005	Whaddup A.. '?!
"Tanpa Kekasihku"	2005	Whaddup A.. '?!
"Tak Ada Logika"	2006	Whaddup A.. '?!
"Cintaku Diujung Jalan"	2006	Whaddup A.. '?!
"Dan Tak Mungkin"	2007	Whaddup A.. '?!
"Matahariku"	2008	Sacredly Agnezious
"Godai Aku Lagi"	2008	Sacredly Agnezious
"Teruskanlah"	2009	Sacredly Agnezious
"Janji-Janji"	2009	Sacredly Agnezious
"Karena Ku Sanggup"	2010	Agnes Is My Name
"Paralyzed"	2011	Agnes Is My Name
"Rindu"	2011	Song To Remember
"Muda (Le O Le O)"	2012	Non-album single
"Walk"	2013	Agnez Mo
"Hide And Seek"	2013	Agnez Mo
"Flying High"	2013	Agnez Mo
"Shut Em Up"	2013	Agnez Mo
"Things Will Get Better"	2013	Agnez Mo
"Coke Bottle" (feat. Timbaland & T.I.)	2014	Single
"I #AM Generation Of Love"	2015	Non-album single
"Boy Magnet"	2015	Boy Magnet (The Dance Remixes) - EP
"Sebuah Rasa"	2016	Single
"Long As I Get Paid"	2017	X
"Damn I Love You"	2017	X
"Overdose" (feat. Chris Brown)	2018	Non-album singles
"Diamonds" (feat. French Montana)	2019	Non-album singles
"Wanna Be Loved"	2019	X
"Nanana"	2019	Non-album singles
"Promises"		Non-album singles
"F***** Boyfriend"		Non-album singles
"F*ck Yo Love Song"	2021	Non-album singles
"Patience"	2022	Non-album singles
"Patience Acoustic Version" (feat. D Smoke)	2022	Non-album singles
"Patience remix" (feat. D Smoke)	2022	Non-album singles
"Boy Magnet (Original Version)"	2022	Non-album singles
"Get Loose" (with Ciara)	2023	Non-album singles
"Party In Bali (PIB)"	2024	Non-album singles

=== As featured artist ===
Title	Year	Featuring	Album
"Awan dan Ombak"	2002	Yana Julio	Jumpa Lagi
"Hanya Cinta Yang Bisa"	2003	Titi DJ	Senyuman
"Said I Loved You...But I Lied"	2011	Michael Bolton	Gems - The Duets Collection
"En Donde Estas"	2012	Christian Chavez	Esencial
"Berkelana ke Ujung Dunia"	2012	Andy rif	Harmoni Alam, Cinta & Kedamaian
"Jatuh Cinta Tak Ada Logika"	2015	The Freaks	The Freaks
"Vroom Vroom"	2015	Chloe X	Single
"Spotlight"	2015	DJ E-Feezy, Timbaland	The Wolf of South Beach
"On Purpose"	2017	Chris Brown	Heart Break on a Full Moon Deluxe Edition:Cuffing Season
"Girl"	2020	Steve Aoki	Neon Future IV
"All Shook Up"	2023	B.I	Love or Loved Part.2
"Cherry on Top (BiniMo Remix)"	2024	Bini	Biniverse

=== Music videos ===
Title	Year	Director
"Si Meong"	1994	Unknown
"Yess!" (feat. Eza Yayang)	1995	Crist Sinyal
"Bala-Bala"	1998	Unknown
"Tralala-Trilili"	1998	Unknown
"Seputih Hati"	2001	S.Subakti I.S
"Bilang Saja"	2003	Glen Kainama
"Indah"	2003	Glen Kainama
"Cinta Mati" (feat. Ahmad Dhani)	2004	Anggy Umbara
"Jera"	2004	Eugene Panji
"Bukan Milikmu Lagi"	2005	Rizal Mantovani
"Tanpa Kekasihku"	2006	Rizal Mantovani
"Tak Ada Logika"	2006	Rizal Mantovani
"Cintaku Diujung Jalan"	2006	Abimael Gandhi
"Dan Tak Mungkin"	2007	Abimael Gandhi
"Matahariku"	2008	Hedy Suryawan
"Godai Aku Lagi"	2008	Dimas Djayadiningrat
"Teruskanlah"	2009	Hedy Suryawan
"Janji-Janji"	2009	Jose Purnomo
"Karena Ku Sanggup"	2010	Jay Subyakto & Davy Linggar
"Paralyzed"	2011	Agnes Monica & Alyandra
"Rindu"	2011	Hedy Suryawan
"Muda (Le O Le O)"	2012	Jose Purnomo
"Walk"	2013	Unknown
"Coke Bottle" (feat. Timbaland & T.I.)	2014	Colin Tilley
"Sebuah Rasa"	2016	Dimas Djayadiningrat
"Long As I Get Paid"	2017	AGNEZ MO & Sasha Samsonova
"Damn I Love You"	2017	AGNEZ MO & Sasha Samsonova
"Overdose" (feat. Chris Brown)	2018	AGNEZ MO
"Wanna be Loved"	2019	AGNEZ MO & Sasha Samsonova
"Na Na Na (Visual Video)"	2019	Unknown
"Promises (Video Lyric)"	2020	Unknown
"F***** Boyfriend"	2020	AGNEZ MO & Sasha Samsonova
"F Yo Love Song"	2021	AGNEZ MO
"Patience"	2022	AGNEZ MO & Danny "Top Shelf Junior"
"Patience Remix" (Feat. D Smoke)	2022	Aramis Duran & AGNEZ MO
"Patience Acoustic" (Feat. D Smoke)	2022	Aramis Duran & AGNEZ MO
" Get Loose" (Feat. Ciara)	2023	Loris Russier & AGNEZ MO
"Party In Bali (PIB)"	2024	AGNEZ MO
"Party In Bali (PIB) REMIX" (Feat. Jay Park)	2024	AGNEZ MO
