= Overdose (Agnez Mo song) =

Single by Agnez Mo featuring Chris Brown
- Released: July 26, 2018
- Genre: Pop; R&B
- Length: 2:54
- Label: 300 Entertainment
- Songwriter(s): Aaron Rogers; Agnes Monica; Antwan Thompson; Chris Brown; Gabriel Blizman; James Washington; Patrizio Pigliapoco; Rashad Johnson
- Producer(s): Aaron Rogers; Antwan "Amadeus" Thompson; Gabriel "GBliz" Blizman; Rashad Johnson

Agnez Mo singles chronology
"Damn I Love You" (2017)	"Overdose" (2018)	"Diamonds" (2019)

Chris Brown singles chronology
"Attention" (2018)	"Overdose" (2018)	"Fairytale" (2018)

Music video
- "Overdose" on YouTube

"Overdose" (also released later as "(Love) Overdose") is a song recorded by Indonesian singer Agnez Mo featuring vocals by American singer Chris Brown. It was released as a standalone single by 300 Entertainment on July 26, 2018.

== Background ==
After signing with The Cherry Party of Sony Music Entertainment, Agnez Mo release the singles "Coke Bottle" (2014) and "Boy Magnet" (2015). Both singles did not attain commercial success, with the latter reaching number 52 on the Billboard Dance Club Songs chart. Mo's international debut album, which was planned for an early 2016 release, was eventually scrapped by the label. Mo recorded another album, titled X, which was released independently on October 10, 2017.

Mo first collaborated with Chris Brown on the track "On Purpose" for the deluxe edition of his album, Heartbreak on a Full Moon (2017). It was announced on April 25, 2018 that Mo had signed her second US deal with 300 Entertainment. "Overdose" was released as her first single under the label on July 26, 2018. Its music video was directed by Mo herself.

== Critical reception ==
Billboard described the track as a "a steamy ode to bright-burning relationships and addicting love."

== Music video ==
The music video for the song, directed by Agnez Mo, was released on September 13, 2018. Running for 5 minutes and 7 seconds, the video features the Indonesian pop star meeting Brown during a beach outing with her friends. As the narrative unfolds, a strong romantic chemistry between Agnez and Brown’s characters becomes apparent, especially through intimate and steamy scenes. However, the storyline takes a dramatic turn when Agnez’s character chooses to walk away, ultimately ending the brief romance depicted in the video.

== Charts ==
Weekly chart performance for "Overdose"
Chart (2018)	Peak position
US R&B/Hip-Hop Airplay (Billboard)	31
US Rhythmic (Billboard)	36
