= 95.2 FM =

FM radio frequency

The following radio stations broadcast on FM frequency 95.2 MHz:

== Bangladesh ==
- Bangla Radio in Dhaka

== China ==
- CNR The Voice of China in Chongqing, Huaihua and Wuzhou

== Greece ==
- Athens DeeJay in Athens

== Indonesia ==
- RRI Pro 2 Surabaya in Surabaya, East Java

== Ireland ==
- Clare FM in Ennistymon
- Highland Radio in Arranmore Island
- RTÉ Lyric FM in the Northeast

== Israel ==
- Kan Bet in Arabah, Jerusalem, the Judea and Samaria Area, Nazareth and Safed

== Malaysia ==
- Era in North Perak, Padang Rengas, Kuala Kangsar and Central Perak
- Buletin FM in Malacca (Coming Soon)

== Poland ==
- Radio Ostrowiec in Ostrowiec Świętokrzyski

== Turkey ==
- Radyo 3 in Gaziantep

== United Kingdom ==
- BBC Radio Cornwall in East Cornwall
- BBC Radio Cumbria in Kendal
- BBC Radio Oxford in Oxford
- Original 106 in West Fife
