= Sacredly Agnezious =

Studio album by Agnes Monica
- Released: 1 April 2009
- Recorded: 2008–2009
- Genre: R&B, soul, hip-hop
- Label: Aquarius Musikindo
- Producer: Agnes Monica, Erwin Gutawa, Pay, Dewiq, Yudis Dwikorana, DJ Sumantri

Agnes Monica chronology
Whaddup A.. '?! (2005)	Sacredly Agnezious (2009)	Agnes Is My Name (2011)

Singles from Sacredly Agnezious
- 1. "Matahariku" Released: January 10, 2008; 2. "Godai Aku Lagi" Released: July 14, 2008; 3. "Teruskanlah" Released: March 23, 2009; 4. "Janji-Janji" Released: September 11, 2009

Sacredly Agnezious is the seventh studio album by Indonesian singer Agnes Monica, released in 2009 by Aquarius Musikindo. Two versions of the album were made: the first contains ten songs and the second version was a limited edition containing thirteen songs.

== About Sacredly Agnezious ==
"Sacredly means something really sacred and that it is more authentic, while Agnezious is an adjective me, which means something that is very me. So "Sacredly Agnezious" can be said as "It's all about me", for which I am involved in it."

Monica involved as producer of the album because she wanted more involvement in determining for what should be displayed in the album. In addition, she wanted to show her maturity as an artist. She explained that there are many famous musicians who participated in making the album.

== Accolades ==
In 2009, Agnez won the Anugerah Musik Indonesia for her single Matahariku as Best Pop Solo Female Artist, and received nominated for Best R&B Production Work for Godai Aku Lagi. In 2010 the album were up for seven nominations at the Anugerah Musik Indonesia 2010. It won Best of the Best Album and Best Pop Album. Teruskanlah won the Best Pop Solo Female Artist category.

== Track listing ==
No.	Title	Writer(s)	Producer(s)	Length
1.	"Godai Aku Lagi"	Agnes Monica	DJ Sumantri	04.12
2.	"Janji-Janji"	Dewiq, Arie S.W.	Pay	04.18
3.	"Hanya Menunggu (Baby Boy)"	Yudis Dwikorana, Bowo, Agnes Monica	Yudis Dwikorana	03.27
4.	"Teruskanlah"	Pay, Dewiq	Pay	04.35
5.	"'Coz I Love You"	Sandy Canester, Agnes Monica	Erwin Gutawa	04.42
6.	"A.G.N.E.Z"	Agnes Monica, Yudis Dwikorana	Yudis Dwikorana	03.29
7.	"Berlebihan"	Sandy Canester, Egus	Pay	06.01
8.	"Matahariku"	Yuan "Passer"	Pay, Dede	04.26
9.	"Shake It Off"	Agnes Monica	Erwin Gutawa	04.52
10.	"Rapuh"	Badai "Kerispatih"	Badai "Kerispatih"	04.23

Gold Version (Limited Edition)

No.	Title	Writer(s)	Length
1.	"Sacredly Agnezious (Intro)"	Agnes Monica	02.24
7.	"A.G.N.E.Z.I.O.U.S (Interlude)"	Agnes Monica, Putra	03.29
13.	"I Believe (Outro)"	Agnes Monica	02.20
