= Sugar Baby (TV series) =

- Genre: Comedy; Drama
- Directed by: Aldo Swastia
- Starring: Adipati Dolken; Davina Karamoy; Winky Wiryawan; Jolene Marie; Shakira Jasmine; Faiz Vishal; Rendy Kjaernett; Bobby Samuel; David Saragih; Bintang Agara; Zidni Adam; Ali Mensan
- Theme music composer: Joseph S. Djafar
- Opening theme: "Bad News", by Christie & Winky Wiryawan
- Ending theme: "Bad News", by Christie & Winky Wiryawan
- Country of origin: Indonesia
- Original language: Indonesian
- No. of seasons: 1
- No. of episodes: 8

Production
- Executive producers: Anthony Buncio; Sutanto Hartono; Mark Francis; Kristo Damar
- Producer: Wicky V. Olindo
- Editor: Alvin Aprilianto Tan
- Camera setup: Multi-camera
- Running time: 40 minutes
- Production company: Screenplay Films

Original release
- Network: Vidio
- Release: 29 November 2025 – 10 January 2026

Sugar Baby is an Indonesian comedy-drama television series produced by Screenplay Films. The series premiered on 29 November 2025 on the streaming platform Vidio.

The series is directed by Aldo Swastia and stars Davina Karamoy, Adipati Dolken, Shakira Jasmine, Arthada, and Winky Wiryawan.

== Synopsis ==
Darma (Adipati Dolken) works as a personal driver for a wealthy businessman named James (Winky Wiryawan). Struggling with financial difficulties and family pressure, Darma's life takes an unexpected turn when James entrusts him with his personal assets during a divorce settlement.

In the midst of this arrangement, Darma meets Susan (Davina Karamoy), one of James's sugar babies, and becomes drawn to her glamorous lifestyle. To win her attention, he pretends to be a wealthy man, though Susan is actually more attracted to his sincerity and modest nature.

Tensions rise when James discovers their relationship and demands his assets back. Meanwhile, Rahmi (Jolene Marie) and Jessica attempt to uncover James's dark secrets, while Susan learns the truth about Darma's identity. The story also explores the friendship between Susan, Tiara (Shakira Jasmine), and Merri (Arthada)—a trio of sugar babies whose bond brings comedic and heartfelt moments amid a world of luxury and hidden truths.

== Cast ==
- Davina Karamoy as Susan
- Adipati Dolken as Darma
- Winky Wiryawan as James
- Jolene Marie as Rahmi
- Shakira Jasmine as Tiara
- Arthada as Meri
- Rachel Mikhayla as Chacha
- Ida Rhijnsburger as Jessica
- Tomy Babap as Madon
- Faiz Vishal as Pati
- Nikita Rizki as Yuli
- Delon Mercy as Dika
- Rendy Kjaernett as Diaz
- Yoan Cocohamida as Sky
- Bobby Samuel as Alvin
- David Saragih as Detektif
- Bintang Agara as Romeo
- Zidni Adam as Vigo
- Martha Alicya as Karin
- Ali Mensan as Cowok Ganteng
- Almanzo Konolrama as Fake Sugar Daddy
- Dwi Surya as Bartender
- Yogi Tama as Tio
- Santana as Jerry
- Bobby Eres as Papa Jessica
- Jessica Caroline as Mahasiswi
- Adrian Aliman as Hakim
- Novia Zufit as Tina
- Andi as Barista
- Mikail as Pengacara Jessica
- Dinda Arinie as Bu Rika
- Reyzi Rayhan as Doni
- Bagus Malvinas as Sofyan
