= Pernikahan Dini =

- Created by: Leo Sutanto
- Developed by: Yazman Yazid
- Written by: Nucke Rahma; Rick ST. Mulyono
- Directed by: S. Subakti. I.S
- Starring: Agnes Monica; Sahrul Gunawan; Atalarik Syah; Elma Theana; Lydia Kandou; Rudy Salam; Meriam Bellina; Della Puspita; Sigit Hardadi; Yati Surachman; Enno Lerian; Errina GD; Fera Rachmi; Jennifer Arnelita; Risma Nilawati; Diva Nadia; Eza Yayang
- Theme music composer: Didi AGP
- Opening theme: Pernikahan Dini, Agnes Monica
- Ending theme: Seputih Hati, Agnes Monica
- Composer: Melly Goeslaw
- Country of origin: Indonesia
- Original language: Indonesian
- No. of episodes: 78

Production
- Producer: Leo Sutanto
- Production location: Jakarta
- Production company: Prima Entertainment

Original release
- Network: Indonesia RCTI
- Release: June 16, 2001 – December 7, 2002

Related
- Pernikahan Dini (2023 TV series); Pernikahan Dini Gen Z

Pernikahan Dini (English translation: Dini's Wedding, or Early-Age Marriage) is a soap opera that aired on RCTI in 2001. The soap opera stars an ensemble cast featuring Agnes Monica, Sahrul Gunawan, Atalarik Syah, Lydia Kandou, and Meriam Bellina. The series won two times at the Panasonic Awards for "Favorite Drama Series Program" in 2001 and 2002.

== Synopsis ==
In this Agnes Monica soap opera, she plays Dini, a smart high school girl. Dini has loads of friends. For a vacation, they go to Bandung, where she meets a guy and falls in love with him. At her birthday party, she is unable to control herself and gets intimate with the guy. A few weeks later, she realizes that she is pregnant, so her family forced the man to marry her. From here, the domestic conflicts began.

This soap opera aired on RCTI and produced by Prima Entertainment.

== Cast ==
- Agnes Monica as Dini, the lead role, the daughter of Duta and Shinta, the sister of Doddy
- Sahrul Gunawan as Gunawan, a village boy who caught his attention and the husband of Dini
- Alatarik Syah as Doddy, the brother of Dini, who raped Asniar's daughter
- Elma Theana as Vina
- Lydia Kandou as Mrs. Shinta, the wife of Duta and mother of Doddy and Dini
- Rudy Salam as Mr. Duta, the husband of Shinta and father of Doddy and Dini
- Meriam Bellina as Mrs. Sudrajat, the wife of Mr. Sudrajat
- Della Puspita as Ratna
- Sigit Hardadi as Mr. Sudrajat, the husband of Mrs. Sudrajat
- Yati Surachman as Asniar, the mother of Dyah, who ever did accused embarrassing
- Enno Lerian as Delia
- Errina GD as Pipit
- Fera Rachmi as Dyah, the daughter of Asniar, who raped by Doddy
- Jennifer Arnelita as Fanny
- Risma Nilawati as Sisiel
- Diva Nadia as Becky
- Eza Yayang as Jordy

== Controversy ==
The two actress also played in this soap opera, Enno Lerian and Errina, made to suffer because Agnes Monica's act. Suddenly, Pipit and Delia's character, who played by both of actress, was removed. The scriptwriter, Eric and Nuke, said "The request was submitted directly by the producer for no apparent reason."

According to Erina, who role as Pipit, cause she was kicked out of the soap opera because often clashed with the schedule of the main character. It is also often trigger an argument. She resigned that "If it's a fight for sure the parents come forward. Better to give in, rather than my relationship with Agnes worse."

Other with Enno, she admitted shocked with this decision. Because, according to information obtained from the screenwriter. Delia's character portrayed by her to until 20 episodes. She quietly said "While me have completed eight episodes."

== Theme song ==
The single "Pernikahan Dini" and "Seputih Hati", sung by Agnes Monica, also became the opening theme and ending theme in the soap opera. The two singles was created by the top musician, Melly Goeslaw, and included to be compilation album was labeled by Aquarius Musikindo, Love Theme.

== Rating ==
This is rating of Pernikahan Dini:

Episode	Aired Date	TVR (All)	Share (%)	Ranking
1	Saturday, June 16, 2001	17	—N/a	2
2	Saturday, June 23, 2001	—N/a	—N/a	—N/a
3	Saturday, June 30, 2001	21,8	—N/a	—N/a
4	Saturday, July 7, 2001	—N/a	—N/a	—N/a
5	Saturday, July 14, 2001	23,2	—N/a	1
6	Saturday, July 21, 2001	—N/a	—N/a	—N/a
7	Saturday, July 28, 2001	—N/a	—N/a	—N/a
8	Saturday, August 4, 2001	—N/a	—N/a	—N/a
9	Saturday, August 11, 2001	19	—N/a	1
10	Saturday, August 18, 2001	—N/a	—N/a	—N/a
11	Saturday, August 25, 2001	—N/a	—N/a	—N/a
12	Saturday, September 1, 2001	18,6	—N/a	—N/a
13	Saturday, September 8, 2001	21	—N/a	—N/a
14	Saturday, September 15, 2001	—N/a	—N/a	—N/a
15	Saturday, September 22, 2001	16,5	—N/a	—N/a
16	Saturday, September 29, 2001	17,2	—N/a	—N/a
17	Saturday, October 6, 2001	18,8	—N/a	—N/a
18	Saturday, October 13, 2001	17,6	—N/a	—N/a
19	Saturday, October 20, 2001	22,5	—N/a	—N/a
20	Saturday, October 27, 2001	22	—N/a	1
21	Saturday, November 3, 2001	20,5	—N/a	—N/a
22	Saturday, November 10, 2001	—N/a	—N/a	—N/a
23	Saturday, November 17, 2001	—N/a	—N/a	—N/a
24	Saturday, November 24, 2001	17,8	—N/a	1
25	Saturday, December 1, 2001	—N/a	—N/a	—N/a
26	Saturday, December 8, 2001	—N/a	—N/a	—N/a
27	Saturday, December 15, 2001	—N/a	—N/a	—N/a
28	Saturday, December 22, 2001	—N/a	—N/a	—N/a
29	Saturday, December 29, 2001	—N/a	—N/a	—N/a
30	Saturday, January 5, 2002	19,1	47,1	2
31	Saturday, January 12, 2002	19,6	48,5	3
32	Saturday, January 19, 2002	15,8	36,1	7
33	Saturday, January 26, 2002	15,9	36,6	4
34	Saturday, February 2, 2002	16,4	39,2	4
35	Saturday, February 9, 2002	17,8	38,8	1
36	Saturday, February 16, 2002	16,2	36,8	4
37	Saturday, February 23, 2002	13,4	32,2	8
38	Saturday, March 2, 2002	13,3	32,9	10
39	Saturday, March 9, 2002	12,7	31,4	9
40	Saturday, March 16, 2002	12,9	30,3	8
41	Saturday, March 23, 2002	13,5	31,8	8
42	Saturday, March 30, 2002	13,3	30,9	10
43	Saturday, April 6, 2002	13	28,7	11
44	Saturday, April 13, 2002	14,3	32,5	6
45	Saturday, April 20, 2002	12,5	29,8	9
46	Saturday, April 27, 2002	11,8	29,3	12
47	Saturday, May 4, 2002	11,4	28,4	12
48	Saturday, May 11, 2002	10,7	25,7	21
49	Saturday, May 18, 2002	10,6	25,1	17
50	Saturday, May 25, 2002	9,9	25,3	21
51	Sunday, June 2, 2002	11,1	28,6	15
52	Saturday, June 8, 2002	—N/a	—N/a	—N/a
53	Saturday, June 15, 2002	9,8	29,1	15
54	Sunday, June 23, 2002	11,9	32,1	15
55	Saturday, June 29, 2002	—N/a	—N/a	—N/a
56	Saturday, July 6, 2002	8,5	22,6	26
57	Saturday, July 13, 2002	11,1	28,3	11
58	Saturday, July 20, 2002	10,9	28,1	11
59	Saturday, July 27, 2002	10,9	28,8	10
60	Saturday, August 3, 2002	10,9	29,4	13
61	Saturday, August 10, 2002	10,5	28,8	14
62	Saturday, August 17, 2002	8,4	23,9	16
63	Saturday, August 24, 2002	6,6	18,6	36
64	Saturday, August 31, 2002	8,6	23,8	18
65	Saturday, September 7, 2002	8	22	18
66	Saturday, September 14, 2002	8	22	18
67	Saturday, September 21, 2002	—N/a	—N/a	—N/a
68	Saturday, September 28, 2002	7	18	40
69	Saturday, October 5, 2002	9,1	24,1	14
70	Saturday, October 12, 2002	7,7	20,4	26
71	Saturday, October 19, 2002	7,7	19,8	25
72	Saturday, October 26, 2002	8,7	22,3	19
73	Saturday, November 2, 2002	8,7	23,9	17
74	Saturday, November 9, 2002	8,1	23,3	23
75	Saturday, November 16, 2002	6,6	19,2	40
76	Saturday, November 23, 2002	8,7	24,4	22
77	Saturday, November 30, 2002	7,5	21,4	33
78	Saturday, December 7, 2002	10,2	29,5	10

== Awards and nominations ==
Year	Award	Category	Recipients	Results
2001	Panasonic Awards	Favorite Drama Series Program	Pernikahan Dini	Won
2001	Panasonic Awards	Favorite Actress	Agnes Monica	Won
2002	Panasonic Awards	Favorite Drama Series Program	Pernikahan Dini	Won
2002	Panasonic Awards	Favorite Actress	Agnes Monica	Won
