= Agnes Is My Name =

Greatest hits album by Agnes Monica
- Released: 2 February 2011
- Recorded: 2002–2011
- Genres: R&B, teen pop, dance-pop, hip-hop, adult contemporary
- Length: 47:36
- Label: Aquarius Musikindo

Agnes Monica chronology
Sacredly Agnezious (2009)	Agnes Is My Name (2011)	Agnez Mo (2013)

Singles from Agnes Is My Name
- 1. "Karena Ku Sanggup" Released: April 14, 2010; 2. "Paralyzed" Released: March 10, 2011

Agnes Is My Name is a greatest hits album by Indonesian singer, Agnes Monica. It was released on 2 February 2011 by Aquarius Musikindo and Kentucky Fried Chicken. The album marked her 10-year relationship with Aquarius Musikindo since the release of her first record "Pernikahan Dini" (2001). It also became her final album with the label and with stage name 'Agnes Monica'. The album contains ten songs with eight compiled from her three previous studio albums and the addition of two new songs, "Karena Ku Sanggup" and "Paralyzed". Due to piracy and the critical state of the Indonesian music scene, Agnes Monica's record label collaborated with the Indonesian franchise of the American fast food restaurant, KFC (Kentucky Fried Chicken) to distribute the album in all KFC stores throughout Indonesia. The album was Monica's first album to sell over 1 million copies. The album was available for purchase separately, but it also came with most of the large KFC combo meals, free of charge.

== Track listing ==
No.	Title	Writer(s)	Producer	Length
1.	"Paralyzed"	Agnes Monica	Beto Cohen	3:38
2.	"Godai Aku Lagi"	Agnes Monica	DJ Sumantri	4:13
3.	"Tak Ada Logika"	Yudis Dwikorana, Yoyo	Yudis Dwikorana	3:37
4.	"Karena Ku Sanggup"	Agnes Monica	Andi Rianto	4:46
5.	"Teruskanlah"	Pay, Dewiq	Pay	4:36
6.	"Janji-Janji"	Dewiq, Arie S.W.	Pay	4:16
7.	"Bukan Milikmu Lagi"	Ari Bias, Mufari	Dodi SS Nay & Agus Hardiman	3:39
8.	"Matahariku"	Yuan "Passer"	Pay, Dede	4:27
9.	"Tanpa Kekasihku"	Dewiq	Erwin Gutawa	5:35
10.	"Jera"	Melly Goeslaw	Anto Hoed	5:07
11.	"Bilang Saja"	Ari Bias	Ari Bias	3:56
12.	"Cinta Di Ujung Jalan"	Dewiq	Pay	4:53
Total length:				47:36

== Certifications ==
Region	Certification	Certified units/sales
Indonesia	—	2,000,000
