= Patience (Agnez Mo song) =

Single by Agnez Mo
- Released: February 11, 2022
- Genre: R&B
- Length: 3:52
- Label: Self-released
- Songwriters: Agnes Monica; Omari K Massenburg; Carmen Reece
- Producers: Ayo; Avb

Agnez Mo singles chronology
"F Yo Love Song" (2021)	"Patience" (2022)	"Get Loose" (2023)

Music video
- "Patience" on YouTube

"Patience" is a song recorded by Indonesian singer Agnez Mo. It was self-released as a standalone single on February 11, 2022.

== Background ==
Since the beginning of her international career, Mo has signed to two different US labels, The Cherry Party in 2014 and 300 Entertainment in 2018. However, both labels failed to materialize any full-length album for her. After the release of "Nanana" (2019), her final single with 300 Entertainment, she became an independent artist. She has since self-released three singles during the COVID-19 pandemic: "Promises", "Fuckin' Boyfriend", and "F Yo Love Song".

"Patience" was released on digital platform on February 11, 2022, with a music video premiering the following day. An acoustic remix of the song featuring D Smoke was released on April 22, 2022. A laid-back R&B track, "Patience" showcases her "effortless falsetto and stripped down vocals".

Mo co-wrote the song with Carmen Reece and Omari K Massenburg, while the production was handled by Ayo and Avb. Talking about inspiration behind the song, Mo said "I wanted to normalize taking the time before rushing into anything. It should be OK to take the time to get to know each other... I really took the time for myself. I call that 'recalibrating' myself. I think that's what I needed [because] now I'm here, as a better artist, better writer, better person."

== Reception ==
"Patience" became Mo's first charting entry on the Billboard charts in four years, since "Overdose" (2018). On the year-end charts, Billboard ranked it as the 37th biggest Adult R&B song of 2022. It was placed at number 14 on iHeartRadio's Top R&B Song of 2022.

== Charts ==
Weekly chart performance for "Patience"
Chart (2022)	Peak position
US R&B/Hip-Hop Airplay (Billboard)	40
US Adult R&B Songs (Billboard)	11
