= Radio Star =

Radio Star may refer to:

- Radio star, in astronomy
- Radio Star (film), a 2006 South Korean film
- Radio Star (TV series), a 2007 South Korean TV series
- Bintang Radio (lit. 'Radio Star'), an Indonesian singing competition
