= Karamoy =

Karamoy is a Minahasan surname. Notable people with the surname include:

- Angel Karamoy (born 1987), Indonesian actress, singer, and comedian
- Anna Adeline Warouw Karamoy (1898–1979), Indonesian female physician
- Davina Karamoy (born 2002), Indonesian actress and singer
