= 96.0 FM =

FM radio frequency

The following radio stations broadcast on FM frequency 96.0 MHz:

== China ==
- CNR Business Radio in Maoming
- RTHK Radio 2 in Hong Kong

== Indonesia ==
- RRI Programa 2 Bandung in Bandung, West Java

== Israel ==
- Radio Kol Rega in Nazareth

== United Kingdom ==
- BBC Radio Cambridgeshire in Cambridge and Cambridgeshire
- BBC Radio Cornwall in the Isles of Scilly
- BBC Radio Derby in Buxton
- BBC Radio Devon in Okehampton
- BBC Radio Newcastle in North Northumberland
- BBC Radio Shropshire in Telford and Shrewsbury
- Greatest Hits Radio South Coast in West Dorset
