= Pass at Me =

Single by Timbaland featuring Pitbull

from the album Shock Value III
- Released: September 13, 2011
- Recorded: 2011
- Genre: Hip house
- Length: 4:10
- Label: Interscope
- Songwriters: Timothy Mosley; Armando Perez; David Guetta
- Producers: Timbaland; David Guetta

Timbaland singles chronology
"Marchin On" (2010)	"Pass at Me" (2011)	"Coke Bottle" (2014)

Pitbull singles chronology
"Suave (Kiss Me)" (2011)	"Pass at Me" (2011)	"I Like How It Feels" (2011)

Music video
- "Pass at Me" on YouTube

Audio sample
- "Pass at Me": file; help

"Pass at Me" is a single from American producer Timbaland. The song features vocals from American rapper Pitbull, also features production by French DJ David Guetta. It was released via digital download on September 13, 2011 in the United States, and received a full release across Europe on the weekend of October 7, 2011.

== Background ==
The song was first announced in August 2011, following Timbaland ceasing releasing free music via his Timbo Thursdays promotion. It was suggested at the time that the track would not be released until December 2011, due to Shock Value III not being released until the new year. However, on September 12, 2011, Timbaland announced that the track would appear on the American iTunes store from midnight on September 13. Subsequently, downloads of the single resulted in it debuting at number 23 on the Bubbling Under Hot 100 chart. It later reached number 4 on that chart. The single was released to European radio on the same date, subsequently appearing on airplay charts in Poland and Slovakia. On September 20, 2011, the single was released in Australia, peaking at number 89 on the ARIA Singles Chart. The single received a full release across Europe on October 7, 2011, and was released in the United Kingdom on October 10, 2011. "Pass at Me" impacted urban radio in the US on September 13, 2011. It impacted top 40/mainstream and rhythmic radio on November 8, 2011.

== Music video ==
The music video was released onto Timbaland's official VEVO channel on September 21, 2011, and was available exclusively to stream in the United States and Australia, before being released worldwide on September 24. The video features Pitbull on a boat, surrounded by girls dressed in Playboy outfits, while Timbaland is seen dancing at the top of a swimming pool at a mansion, similarly, surrounded by Playboy bunnies. The video continues like so until the third and final chorus, where the pair meet up at a party, of which David Guetta is the DJ, and such, the trio perform the last section of the song together.

As of February 2020, the video has received over 33 million views on YouTube.

== Remix ==
The official remix was made with the Puerto Rican duo Wisin & Yandel.

== Formats and track listings ==
- Digital Download
1. "Pass at Me" (Explicit) – 4:10
2. "Pass at Me" (Spanish Remix) – 4:20
- CD Single
1. "Pass at Me" (Clean Radio Edit) – 4:07
2. "Pass at Me" (Explicit) – 4:10
- Remixes – EP
1. "Pass at Me" (Tommy Trash Remix) – 5:22
2. "Pass at Me" (Junior Sanchez Remix) – 7:02
3. "Pass at Me" (Tim Mason Remix) – 5:32
4. "Pass at Me" (Genetix Remix) – 5:11

== Chart performance ==
Chart (2011–12)	Peak position
Australia (ARIA)	61
Belgium (Ultratip Bubbling Under Flanders)	8
Belgium (Ultratip Bubbling Under Wallonia)	9
France (SNEP)	100
Germany (GfK)	27
Ireland (IRMA)	37
Latvia (European Hit Radio)	13
Poland (Dance Top 50)	39
Slovak Airplay Chart (IFPI)	58
UK Hip Hop/R&B (OCC)	14
UK Singles (OCC)	40
US Dance Club Songs (Billboard)	11
US Latin Pop Airplay (Billboard)	35
US Pop Airplay (Billboard)	35
US Rhythmic Airplay (Billboard)	35

== Release history ==
Region	Date	Format	Label
Australia	August 8, 2011	Contemporary Hit Radio, Nights	Interscope Records
United States	September 13, 2011	Digital download	Interscope Records
United States	September 13, 2011	Urban radio	Interscope Records
Worldwide	September 13, 2011	Digital Download	Interscope Records
Germany	October 7, 2011	Digital download, CD single	Interscope Records
United Kingdom	October 10, 2011	Digital download	Interscope Records
United States	November 8, 2011	Top 40/Mainstream and Rhythmic radio	Interscope Records
