= Pernikahan Dini Gen Z =

2025 Indonesian romantic-drama television series

- Genre: Teen drama Romance; Melodrama
- Created by: Manoj Punjabi
- Directed by: M. Haikal
- Starring: Richelle Skornicki; Aliando Syarief; Samudra Taylor; Zora Vidyanata; Agoye Mahendra
- Opening theme: "Pernikahan Dini", Aliya Salma & Devanka Ziya
- Ending theme: "Pernikahan Dini", Aliya Salma & Devanka Ziya
- Composer: Brahman
- Country of origin: Indonesia
- Original language: Indonesian
- No. of seasons: 1
- No. of episodes: 40

Production
- Executive producer: Shania Punjabi
- Producers: Manoj Punjabi; Syaiful Drajat A. S.; Nasrul Warid
- Cinematography: G. N Pelita
- Camera setup: Multi-camera
- Production company: MD Entertainment

Original release
- Network: MDTV
- Release: 16 December 2025 – 12 February 2026

Related
- Pernikahan Dini (2001 TV series); Pernikahan Dini (2023 TV series)

Pernikahan Dini Gen Z (usually written in style: Pernikahan ~~Dini~~ Gen Z) is an Indonesian television series that premiered on 16 December 2025 to 12 February 2026 on MDTV. Produced by Manoj Punjabi under MD Entertainment. It stars Richelle Skornicki, Aliando Syarief, and Samudra Taylor.

== Plot ==
Dini, an outstanding student, is romantically involved with Rangga, a popular senior and aspiring national basketball player. Because of their relationship, which goes too far, Dini faces the harsh reality of an out-of-wedlock pregnancy. Both must face various consequences, including the threat of ruining their educational futures. The problems between these two teenagers are further complicated by the presence of Tristan, Dini's childhood friend.

== Cast ==
- Richelle Skornicki as Andini Karmelia
- Aliando Syarief as Rangga Hadikusumo
- Samudra Taylor as Tristan
- Jasmine Meijers as Nina
- Akhmad Fadli as Fajar Ramadan
- Ardina Rasti as Dewi Karmelia
- Adi Irwandi as Prasetyo Hadikusumo
- Ivan Ray as Bramantyo
- Kathy Indera as Joanita Hadikusumo
- Angel Marianne sebagai Nabila Jessica
- Jessica Shaina as Milly
- Caroline Dolivia as Maura
- Jasmine Nadya as Evelyn Nadia / Savanna
- Dewanti Anggraini as Kayla
- Chalista Ellysia as Keisha
- M. Fachri Al-Bukhori as Leo
- Ryan Bakri as Ryan
- Tomy Babap as Dayat
- Asilla Corina as Carla
- Erlando as Rain
- Cornel Nadeak as Cornel
- Bertram Beryl as Ryan
- Ananda Dhieza as Ananda
- Agoye Mahendra as Agoye
- Tubagus Indra as Boim
- Indri Oktaviani Siahaan as Fany
- Zora Vidyanata as Fiona Alexandra

== Production ==
=== Casting ===
Aliando Syarief was roped in to play Rangga and For playing Rangga, Aliando lost 24 kg. Richelle Skornicki to play the role of Dini. Kathy Indera was cast.
