= And the Story Goes =

Studio album by Agnes Monica
- Released: 8 October 2003
- Recorded: 2002–2003
- Genres: R&B, pop, soul, urban
- Length: 41:39
- Label: Aquarius Musikindo
- Producers: Ari Bias, Yudis Dwikorana, Melly Goeslaw, Ahmad Dhani, Titi DJ

Agnes Monica chronology
Tra La La Tri Li Li (1999)	And the Story Goes (2003)	Whaddup A.. '?! (2005)

Singles from And the Story Goes
- 1. "Bilang Saja" Released: August 15, 2003; 2. "Indah" Released: November 14, 2003; 3. "Cinta Mati" Released: April 2, 2004; 4. "Jera" Released: August 11, 2004; 5. "Ku T'lah Jatuh Cinta" Released: December 14, 2004

And the Story Goes is the fifth studio album and the first adult album by Indonesian singer Agnes Monica, released in 2003 by Aquarius Musikindo. The album, ..And the Story Goes, not only reach a high result in sales (double platinum) but also shows that Agnes Monica has done a perfect transition from a children singer to an adult singer. Along with the album, NEZindaHood (Agnes Monica's official Dancer) was born.

== Singles ==
=== "Bilang Saja" ===
"Bilang Saja" (English: Just Say) is the first single of the album. The pop rock song criticizes men who will always do everything to get what they want without knowing the problems they have caused, as shown in the first verse of the lyrics Lelaki terkadang selalu ingin memaksakan apa yang mereka inginkan untuk memiliki, sebelum semua menjadi semakin masalah (Men sometimes want to forcefully [get] what they want to be theirs, before all gets into trouble). The music video, however, draws hip-hop influences.

=== "Indah" ===
Penned by Indonesian pop singer-songwriter, Melly Goeslaw, "Indah" (English: Lovely) is an R&B/urban-influenced pop track. Released as the second single, the protagonist of the song demands her lover to give his love and convinces him that he will not regret loving her. The music video for "Indah" is influenced by hip-hop dance and culture.

=== "Cinta Mati" ===
"Cinta Mati" (English: Love to Death) was released as the third single. The song was written and features Indonesian pop rock record producer and singer-songwriter Ahmad Dhani. In the song, the protagonists of the song tell how big their love is, as they sing Cintaku sedalam samudra/setinggi langit di angkasa/kepadamu/cintaku sebesar dunia/seluas jagad raya ini/kepadamu (My love is as deep as ocean/as high as the sky in the space/for you/My love is as big as the world/as large as this universe/for you). The music video for the song features both artists singing with Agnes singing in the coldness and Ahmad Dhani singing and playing piano surrounded by fire.

=== "Jera" ===
Another Melly Goeslaw-penned track, "Jera" (English: Chary), was released as the fourth and final single of the album. The lyrical content shows that she is chary to love because her lover's decision to dump her. The music video shows a cold relationship with random scenes of Agnes singing in the rain and darkness.

== Track listing ==
No.	Title	Writer(s)	Producer(s)	Length
1.	"Indah"	Melly Goeslaw	Anto Hoed	4.12
2.	"Ini Gila, Ini Cinta"	Ahmad Dhani	Ahmad Dhani	4.38
3.	"Cinta Mati" (feat. Ahmad Dhani)	Ahmad Dhani	Ahmad Dhani	4.03
4.	"Hanya Cinta Yang Bisa" (feat. Titi DJ)	Titi DJ	Andi Rianto	3.06
5.	"Bilang Saja"	Ari Bias	Ari Bias	4.03
6.	"Ku T'lah Jatuh Cinta"	Yudis Dwikorana, Pipic, Taufan	Yudis Dwikorana	3.06
7.	"Don't"	Melly Goeslaw	Anto Hoed	4.02
8.	"Tak Bisa"	Ari Bias	Ari Bias	5.14
9.	"Jera"	Melly Goeslaw	Anto Hoed	5.05
10.	"Kau Yang Kucinta"	Down Art	Down Art	4.48
Total length:				41:39

== Personnel ==
- Dessy Fitri – Vocals (background)
- Andi Rianto – String Arrangements
- Steve Smart – Mastering
