= Pernikahan Dini (2023 TV series) =

2023 Indonesian romantic-drama streaming television series

- Genre: Drama; Romance
- Based on: Pernikahan Dini
- Screenplay by: Evelyn Afnilia; Benni Setiawan
- Directed by: Benni Setiawan
- Starring: Megan Domani; Randy Martin
- Opening theme: "Pernikahan Dini" by Soundwave
- Ending theme: "Pernikahan Dini" by Soundwave
- Composer: Joseph S. Djafar
- Country of origin: Indonesia
- Original language: Indonesian
- No. of seasons: 1
- No. of episodes: 10

Production
- Producer: Manoj Punjabi
- Cinematography: Ipung Rachmat Syaiful
- Editor: Gita Miaji
- Camera setup: Multi-camera
- Running time: ±44 minutes
- Production company: MD Entertainment

Original release
- Network: Disney+ Hotstar
- Release: September 23 – November 18, 2023

Related
- Pernikahan Dini (2001 TV series); Pernikahan Dini Gen Z

Pernikahan Dini (transl. Dini's Wedding or Early-Age Marriage) is an Indonesian television series produced by MD Entertainment that premiered 23 September 2023 on Disney+ Hotstar based on the film of the same name. This series was directed by Benni Setiawan and starring Megan Domani and Randy Martin.

== Synopsis ==
The twists and turns of the journey of a girl named Dini, an intelligent teenager whose life changes due to the events of one disastrous night. Dini wakes up next to Rayi, the student council president and the person she likes. Dini felt scared when she found Rayi sleeping next to her without wearing clothes. Dini realized that Rayi had forced her to have sex while she was unconscious. When Dini found out that she was pregnant, this is where problems began to arise. Since then, Dini's life has no longer seemed the same. This bitter reality forces Dini to leave school and her old life to start a new journey full of challenges. Far from being over, the problems in her life increase when Vincent, a person known as a bad boy or troublemaker at school, admits to being the father of the child in her womb.

== Cast ==
=== Main ===
- Megan Domani as Andini Farra Yasmine
- Randy Martin as Vincent Chandradinata

=== Recurring ===
- Giulio Parengkuan as Rayinda Sapta Anggara
- Jessica Shaina as Gisel
- Nyimas Ratu Rafa as Carla
- Ferdy Tahier as Pendi Perdana Satria
- Rianti Cartwright as Deborah
- Sarah Felicia as Marsha
- Christie Arranda as Bella
- Clay Gribble as Fikri
- Bertram Beryl as Argo
- Fajar Kibo as Ricky
- Harleyava Princy as Sofie
- Olivia Morrison as Henna
- Renaga Tahier as Doni
- Adi Irwandi as Ferdi Chandradinata
- Lolox as Tigor
- Ephy Pae as Simon
- Oline Mendeng as Aci
- Julian Kunto as Dadan
- Je Sebastian as Alex
- Maura Gabrielle as Angelica
- Joseph Kara as Hermanto Anggara
- Wina Marrino as Rina
- Feby Annisa as Anastasia
- McDanny as Alvin
- Teddy Snada as Anggoro
- Azda Nur as Nicky

== Production ==
=== Development ===
In September 2022, Punjabi announced it would adapt the iconic "Pernikahan Dini" film. Punjabi said, "So this story, this IP (Intelectual Property) is old, it's been brewing maybe since 2018. I feel like I have a very relatable story even though it's been a long time since the film was in the 70s, and a television series was also made." Pernikahan Dini series focuses more on the conflicts of teenage children. It's just that parents are involved in the problems faced by their teenagers. Director Setiawan said, "So here we don't just describe the teenager, but also the impact on his family."

=== Casting ===
Megan Domani and Randy Martin was selected to portray the lead role of Dini and Vincent. Rianti Cartwright was cast to play the role of Deborah.
