= Bad Boys vs Crazy Girls =

Indonesian teen television series

- Genre: Teen; Drama
- Based on: Bad Boys vs Crazy Girls by Asriaci
- Written by: Dono Indarto
- Directed by: Emil Heradi; Josephine L. Winardi
- Starring: Devano Danendra; Megan Domani; Zenia Zein; Montserrat Gizelle; Grace Emmanuela; Adam Farrel; Reza A. Fahlevi; Lachlan Gibson; Gabriella Ekaputri; Davina Karamoy; Antonio Blanco Jr.; Miranty Dewi; Joshua Pandelaki; Rowiena Umboh; Ayu Inten; Nizam Hasan; Frans Nickolas; Mike Lucock
- Music by: Yudhi Arfani
- Country of origin: Indonesia
- Original language: Indonesian
- No. of seasons: 2
- No. of episodes: 20

Production
- Executive producers: Varun Mehta; Dian W. Sasmita; Ajish Dibyo; Wicaksono Wisnu Legowo
- Producers: Ajish Dibyo; Wicaksono Wisnu Legowo
- Cinematography: Wendy Aga
- Editors: Kelvin Nugroho; Rico Chandra M.
- Camera setup: Multi-camera
- Running time: 45 minutes
- Production company: Spasi Moving Image

Original release
- Network: Viu
- Release: 14 October 2022 – 2 January 2024

Bad Boys vs Crazy Girls is an Indonesian teen television series based on the novel of the same name by Asriaci. The first season aired on 14 October 2022. It stars Devano Danendra and Megan Domani. The second season aired from 4 December 2023 to 2 January 2024.

== Series overview ==
Series	Episodes	Originally released	
Series	Episodes	First released	Last released
1	10	14 October 2022	14 October 2022
2	10	4 December 2023	2 January 2024

== Plot ==
=== Season 1 ===
Katrina Azzela, affectionately known as Kate. To fulfill her parents' wish for Kate to pursue business studies in London, Kate's parents wanted their daughter to be serious about school.

However, Kate ended up dating Michael, who was significantly older than her. Because she didn't want Kate to be distracted from her studies, she enrolled in the Merah Putih boarding school, known for its strict discipline.

Separated from her boyfriend, Kate tried to get expelled from her new school. She devised a scenario that convinced her to get expelled. Using her gang, the Crazy Girls, Kate caused a commotion. At that time, she also met someone she hated, Liam. Liam also shared her desire to leave the Merah Putih boarding school.

For special considerations, the school didn't expel either of them, only punishing them. This punishment actually helped Kate and Liam get to know each other better.

=== Season 2 ===
Kate and Liam's relationship is strained by the distance that separates them. Kate is busy with her fashion career in Milan, while Liam struggles to rebuild his music career.

Liam then meets Mika a successful singer who helps him revive his music career. Meanwhile, Kate reunites with her childhood friend, Destan who develops a crush on her.

Liam and Kate face many obstacles and problems, both in their careers and, of course, in their relationship, which is in the midst of collapse after Mika and Destan's arrival.

So, can they resolve their issues without breaking up? Or will they start to move on?.

== Cast ==
=== Season 1 ===
- Devano Danendra as Liam Fredie Fernandez
- Megan Domani as Katrina Azzela
- Zenia Zein as Jane
- Montserrat Gizelle as Anna Candice
- Grace Emmanuela as Melody Alexandria
- Reza A. Fahlevi as Dilan Arkana
- Adam Farrel as Angga Calvins
- Lachlan Gibson as Arsen
- Gabriella Ekaputri as Laura
- Rowiena Umboh as Yasmin: Kate's mother
- Nicole Adelaide Parham as Fiona
- Joshua Pandelaki as Ihsan, Kate's father
- Vladimir Rama as Michael
- Martha Alicya as Keke
- Jenny Zhang as Diandra Andari Sasmita
- Emmie Lemu as Kasih
- Aurelia Lourdes as Lea
- Sofia Safira as Dinda
- Linda Leona as Ibu Fiona
- Zidan El Hafiz as Rema
- Elscant Wifesa as Jaden Athala
- Ayu Inten as Ibu Yani
- Reynhard Ivander as Justice
- Juan Hendry as Albert
- Moh. Iqbal Sulaiman as Idoy
- Nizam Hasan as Yudo
- Bonny Han as Ayah Rema
- Julia Van Vlotten as Ina
- Putri El Zahra as Tania

==== Season 2 ====
- Yeyen Lidya as Pingkan
- Pascal Voglimacci as monsieur Pierre
- Stella Schröer as Selena
- Josephine L. Winardi as Lasya
- Agus Mahesa as Johan
- Mira Asmara as Ibu Dastan
- Frans Nickolas as Ayah Anna
- Kai Bejo as Aidan
- Oppie Andaresta as Ibu Aidan
- Raisya Siregar as Raisya
- Miranty Dewi as Ibu Raisya
- Mike Lucock as Adnan: Liam's father; Salwa's husband
- Wina Marrino as Salwa: Liam's mother; Adnan's wife
- Joseph Kara as Ihsan, Kate's father
- Ence Bagus as Jejen
- Arief Didu as Badrun
- Nicole Rossi as Kikan
- Davina Karamoy as Mikayla
- Antonio Blanco Jr. as Dastan
- Maya Wulan as Cika
- Verdi Solaiman as Danang
- David Saragih as Daniel Fathony
- Anyun Cadel as Darman
- Luana Dutra as Prisa
- Queen Jasmine as Agni

== Production ==
=== Release ===
The series was originally set to release on 28 September 2025, then postponed to 29 September 2022 and finally released on 14 October 2022. In November 2023, Viu announced the release of the poster and teaser of Bad Boys vs Crazy Girls 2.

=== Casting ===
Megan Domani was reported to play Katrina Azzela. Devano Danendra was confirmed to play Liam. In the second season, Megan and Devano were confirmed to reprise their roles as Katrina and Liam.
