= Megan Domani =

Indonesian actress and model (born 2002)

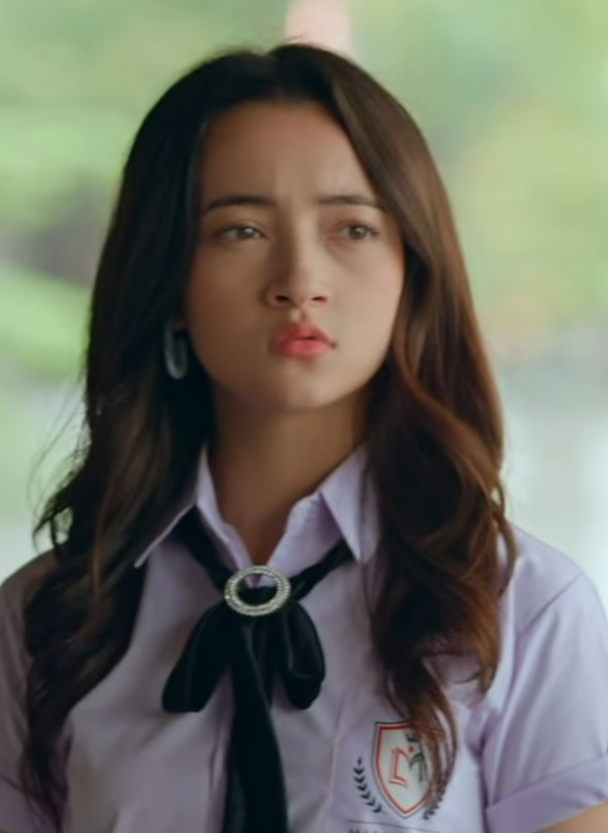
- Bad Boys vs Crazy Girls series (2022)
- Born: Megan Anita Domani; 14 October 2002 (age 23); Montego Bay, Jamaica
- Occupations: Celebrity; Model
- Years active: 2013–present
- Family: Bryan Domani (brother)

Megan Anita Domani (born 14 October 2002) is an Indonesian film and television actress and model. In the 2020s, she played lead and supporting roles in a number of Indonesian web series, including Jodoh yang Tertukar, and television series like Seleb and Cinta karena Cinta, for which she received two nominations and one win at the SCTV Awards. She also played lead roles in various Indonesian feature films, including Satu untuk Selamanya (2022) and Azzamine (2024).

== Early life ==
Megan Anita Domani was born on 14 October 2002 in Montego Bay, Jamaica, to Jurgen and Ade Domani. Her father is a German-Italian, while her mother is from Banjarmasin, Indonesia. She is the younger sister of Indonesian actor and model, Bryan Domani.

== Filmography ==
=== Film ===
| Year | Title | Role | Notes | Ref. |
|---|---|---|---|---|
| 2019 | Sin (anthology film) | | Third segment in an anthology film | |
| 2022 | Satu untuk Selamanya | Ziva | Lead role | |
| 2024 | Si Juki the Movie: Harta Pulau Monyet | | Lead role | |
| 2024 | Algrafi | Nayanika Zaqueena Dya (alto referred to as Naya) | Lead role | |
| 2024 | Azzamine | Haura Jasmine | Lead role | |

=== Web series ===
| Year | Title | Role | Notes | Ref. |
|---|---|---|---|---|
| 2018 | Beautifool | | Episode: "Acne" | |
| 2021 | My Love My Enemy | Maharani | Lead role | |
| 2022 | My Love My Enemy Season 2 | Maharani | Lead role | |
| 2022 | Bad Boys vs Crazy Girls | Katrina Azzela (Kate) | Lead role | |
| 2023 | Jodoh atau Bukan | Natalie | Main cast | |
| 2023 | Pernikahan Dini | Dini | Lead role | |
| 2023 | Bad Boys vs Crazy Girls Season 2 | Katrina Azzela (Kate) | Lead role | |

=== Television series ===
| Year | Title | Role | Notes | Ref. |
|---|---|---|---|---|
| 2015 | Operation Wedding Series | Tara (young) | | |
| 2015–2016 | Anak Jalanan | Megan | Main cast | |
| 2017 | Anak Sekolahan | Indah | Main cast | |
| 2017 | Mawar dan Melati | Zee-Zee/Cantika | Main cast | |
| 2017 | Putri Titipan Tuhan | Suki | Main cast | |
| 2017 | Jodoh yang Tertukar | Ruby | Supporting role; SCTV Award 2017 for the most popular actress in a supporting role | |
| 2017 | Anak Masjid | Mey (or Mai) | Lead role | |
| 2017–2018 | Sodrun Merayu Tuhan | Anisa | Main cast | |
| 2018 | Seleb | Sukila (La Suki) | Lead role; SCTV Award 2018 nomination for Most Popular Lead Actress | |
| 2018–2019 | Cinta Misteri | Dinda Aruni | Lead role | |
| 2019 | Topeng Kaca | Megan | Main cast | |
| 2019–2020 | Cinta karena Cinta | Keisya | Supporting role; SCTV Award 2019 for Most Popular Supporting Actress | |
| 2020 | Cinta tapi Benci | Bianca | Lead role | |
| 2020 | Catatan Harianku | Kayla | Episode: "Jatuh Cinta pada Catatan Terakhir" | |
| 2021 | Catatan Harianku | Ziva | Episode: "Kekasih Semu" | |
| 2021 | Catatan Harianku | Karina | Episode: "Impian Terakhir" | |
| 2024 | Sehati Semati | Sheila | Lead role | |

=== Television film ===
- Kenapa Kau Buang Ibu (2013)
- Kembalilah Anakku (2015)
- Pacar untuk Adikku (2017)

== Awards and nominations ==
| Year | Award | Category | Nominated work | Result | Ref. |
|---|---|---|---|---|---|
| 2017 | SCTV Awards | Most Popular Supporting Actress | Jodoh yang Tertukar | Won | |
| 2018 | SCTV Awards | Most Popular Lead Actress | Seleb | Nominated | |
| 2019 | SCTV Awards | Most Popular Supporting Actress | Cinta karena Cinta | Won | |
| 2019 | SCTV Awards | Most Social Media Artist | - | Nominated | |
