= Roger Danuarta =

Indonesian soap opera actor (born 1982)

- Born: May 20, 1982 (age 43); Jakarta, Indonesia
- Occupation: Singer
- Years active: 1997–present
- Musical career
- Instrument: Vocal

Roger Danuarta (born May 20, 1982) is a soap opera actor and singer from Indonesia. Roger Danuarta is the eldest son of hairdresser Johnny Danuarta.

Danuarta's first appearance on television was in the soap opera Cinta Berkalang Noda. Before this, he was appear as guest star in soap opera Jin dan Jun in 1997. His father encouraged Roger Danuarta to audition and enrolled him in singing lessons.

Roger Danuarta has starred in soap operas such as Siapa Takut Jatuh Cinta, Amanda, Yang Muda Yang Bercinta, Cewekku Jutek, Anakku Bukan Anakku, Ada Apa Denganmu, Sebatas Impian (including Asty Ananta), Preman Kampus, Cinta Dalam Maut, and Galang. Pengorbanan Anggun.

Roger Danuarta released two solo albums. His inaugural album Zhao Yao Shuo Ni (As What You Want) released ahead of Chinese New Year was followed by a spiritually themed album, released ahead of Christmas. On July 14, 2007, Roger Danuarta joined nine soap opera actors for 10 Male Sinetron Artist: Compilation Album.

== Soap operas ==
- Jin dan Jun
- Cinta Berkalang Noda
- Siapa Takut Jatuh Cinta
- Yang Muda yang Bercinta
- Amanda (sinetron)
- Cewekku Jutek
- Anakku Bukan Anakku
- Ada apa Denganmu
- Sebatas Impian
- Preman Kampus
- Cinta Dalam Maut
- Galang
- Pengorbanan Anggun

== Filmography ==
- Ada Hantu di Vietnam (2012)
