= Agnez Mo =

Indonesian singer and actress (born 1986)

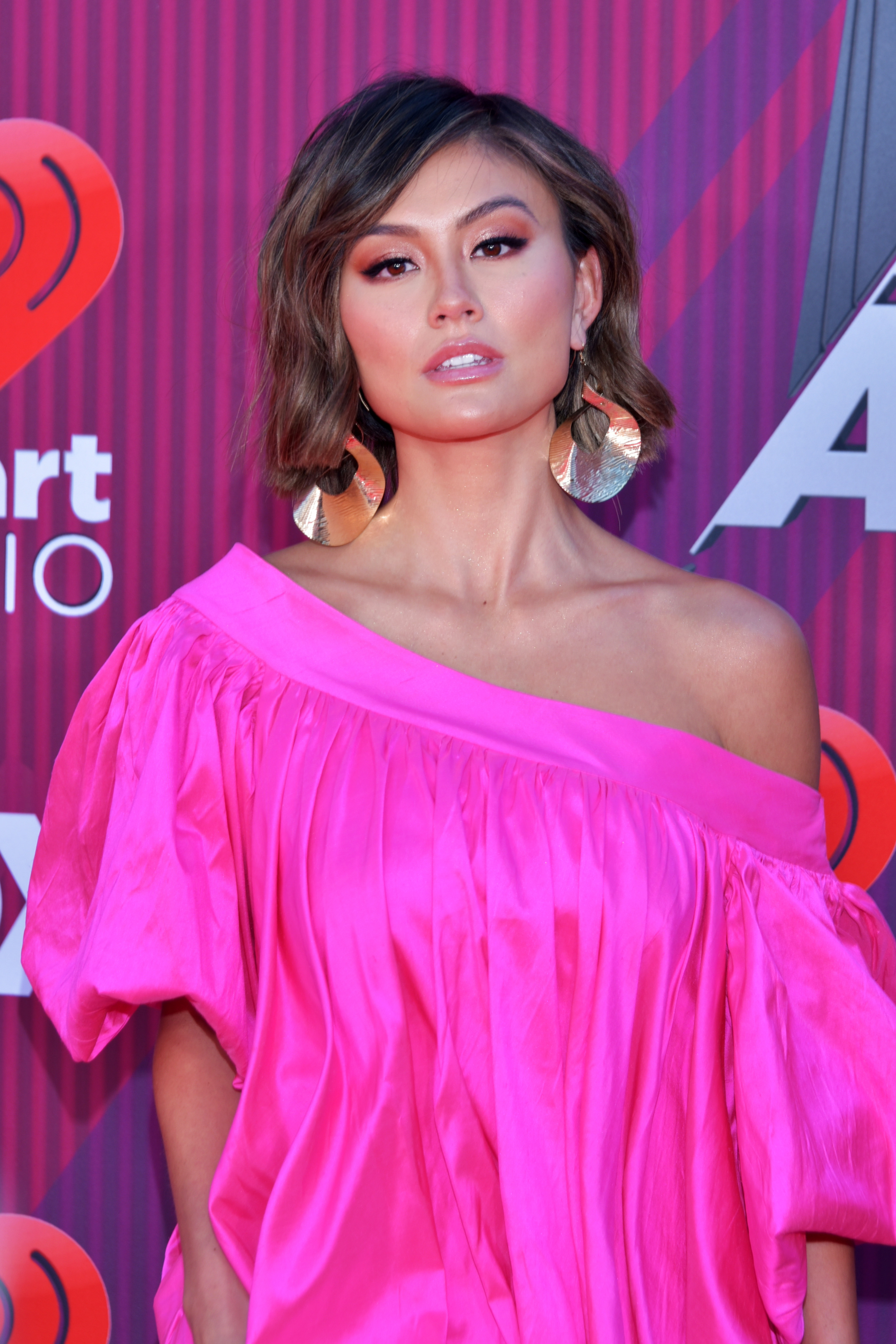
- Mo at the 2019 iHeartRadio Music Awards
- Born: Agnes Monica Muljoto; 1 July 1986 (age 40); Jakarta, Indonesia
- Other name: Agnes Monica (stage name until 2013)
- Occupations: Singer; songwriter; actress; record producer; dancer; model; businesswoman
- Years active: 1992–present
- Agent: United Talent Agency
- Awards: Full list
- Musical career
- Genres: R&B; pop; hip-hop; Soul
- Instrument: Vocals
- Labels: Aquarius Musikindo; The Cherry Party; 300; Rated A
- Website: agnezmo.com

Agnes Monica Muljoto (born 1 July 1986), known professionally as Agnez Mo (previously Agnes Monica), is an Indonesian singer, songwriter, and actress. Born in Jakarta, she started her career as a child singer in the 1990s. She later transformed into an Indonesian pop icon of the 2000s and launched her international career in the mid-2010s.

After recording four children's albums and hosting several variety shows, Mo established herself as a teen idol with her leading role in the TV series Pernikahan Dini (2001). Her first adult studio album, And the Story Goes (2003), was certified Double Platinum in Indonesia. She followed it with another successful studio albums Whaddup A.. '?! (2005) and Sacredly Agnezious (2009), and continued starring in various TV series in between. In 2006, Mo also took part in two Taiwanese drama series, The Hospital and Romance In The White House. Mo also became a judge for singing competitions Indonesian Idol (2010–2012) and The Voice Indonesia (2016–2018).

Mo rebranded herself with a new stage name on her first English studio album, Agnez Mo (2013). After signing a record deal with The Cherry Party (an American label ventured with Sony Music) in 2014, Mo released her first international single, "Coke Bottle" (featuring Timbaland and T.I.). Her second English album, X (2017), was produced by Danja. Mo continued releasing a string of standalone singles until the mid-2020s, three of which—"Boy Magnet", "Overdose" (featuring Chris Brown), and "Patience"—entered the US Billboard charts. In 2025, Mo was cast as Lila Hoth on the American TV series Reacher.

Mo is the most-awarded Indonesian artist in history, with local awards including 18 Anugerah Musik Indonesia and 8 Panasonic Awards, as well as international ones such as 3 awards of Asia Song Festival, 2 Mnet Asian Music Awards, an iHeartRadio Music Award, and a World Music Award. She became the first Indonesian artist to be immortalised in multiple wax statues by Madame Tussauds—in its Singapore, Hong Kong, and Hollywood museums. In 2020, Mo was listed among the 10 highlighted figures on Forbes Asia's 100 Digital Stars: Asia-Pacific's Most Influential Celebrities on Social Media.

== Life and career ==
=== 1986–2002: Childhood and early career ===
Agnes Monica Muljoto was born in Jakarta to a family of Chinese, Japanese, and German ancestry. She attended Tarakanita Elementary School and Pelita Harapan Junior and Senior High school in Jakarta. She has shown her talent in the performing arts since childhood, especially in singing. She sang in church and was also sent to vocal courses.

Using "Agnes Monica" as her stage name, Mo entered the entertainment industry in 1992 with her first children's album, Si Meong. In 1995, she released her second children's album, Yess!, which was a duet album with fellow Indonesian child singer Eza Yayang. Her last two children's albums were Bala-Bala (1998) and Tra La La Tri Li Li (1999). She also became the host for several children's programs, including Video Anak Anteve (VAN) on ANTV, Tralala - Trilili on RCTI, and Diva Romeo on Trans TV. She was awarded "Most Favorite Presenter of Children's Program" at the Panasonic Awards in 1999 and 2000 for Tralala - Trilili.

Mo began acting when she was 13 years old. Her first two roles were on the soap operas Lupus Millenia and Mr. Hologram in 1999. The next year, she starred in the TV series Pernikahan Dini, which served as a turning point in her career by transforming her image from that of a child artist to one of a teenage artist. Her performance in the series was well received by audiences, resulting in her receiving the "Favorite Actress" award at the 2001 and 2002 Panasonic Awards as well as the "Famous Actress" award at the 2002 SCTV Awards. In 2002, Mo starred in three soap operas: Ciuman Pertama, Kejar Daku Kau Ku Tangkap, and Amanda. Due to her popularity, she became the highest-paid teenage artist in Indonesia.

Mo returned to the music industry with the Melly Goeslaw-penned songs "Pernikahan Dini" and "Seputih Hati" for the soundtrack of Pernikahan Dini. Both songs were featured on the 2001 compilation album Love Theme, released by Indonesian record label Aquarius Musikindo. Mo signed a record deal with the label and began working on her teen breakthrough album. She also collaborated with her labelmate and senior singer Yana Julio in the song "Awan dan Ombak" for his 2002 studio album, Jumpa Lagi.

=== 2003–2006: And The Story Goes, TV series, and Whaddup A.. '?! ===
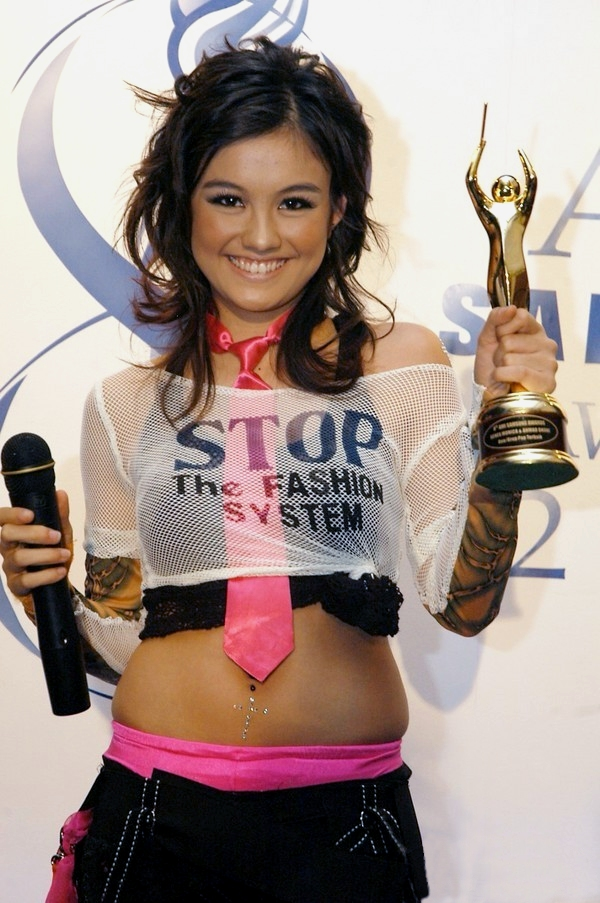
Mo received her first Anugerah Musik Indonesia (Indonesian Music Award) in 2004.

On 8 October 2003, Mo released her first studio album as an adult, And the Story Goes, in which she worked with several prominent Indonesian producers and songwriters, including Ahmad Dhani, Melly Goeslaw, and Titi DJ. The album production took a year and a half, including the audition process for the dancers. According to her record label, the album sold 35,000 copies before its official release. It was later certified double platinum after selling more than 300,000 copies. Four singles were released from the album: "Bilang Saja", "Indah", "Jera" and "Cinta Mati" (featuring Ahmad Dhani). The album received ten nominations at the 2004 Anugerah Musik Indonesia. Mo won three awards for Best Pop Female Solo Artist, Best Dance/Techno Production Work, and Best Pop Duo/Group for her duet with Dhani. She also won Best Female Newcomer Artist at the 2004 Anugerah Planet Muzik in Singapore

While promoting her debut album, Mo also starred in several TV series, playing the lead role in three of them: Cewekku Jutek, Bunga Perawan, and Cantik. She won Most Favorite Actress at the 2003 Panasonic Awards and Most Popular Actress at 2004 SCTV Awards.

Mo launched her second studio album, Whaddup A.. '?!, on 10 December 2005. It featured five singles: "Bukan Milikmu Lagi", "Tanpa Kekasihku", "Tak Ada Logika", "Cinta Di Ujung Jalan", and "Tak Mungkin". In addition to working with prominent Indonesian musicians such as Melly Goeslaw, Andi Rianto, and Erwin Gutawa, she also collaborated with American singer-songwriter Keith Martin. Martin wrote two English songs for the album, including the duet "I'll Light a Candle". To promote the album, she held a concert tour known as Clasnezenzation in four Indonesian cities.

The album was a commercial success, and Mo won two 2006 Anugerah Musik Indonesia for Best Pop Female Solo Artist and Best R&B Production Work. She also won the Most Favorite Female award at the 2006 MTV Indonesia Awards. Mo was nominated for Favorite Artist Indonesia award at the 2005 MTV Asia Awards. She was the youngest artist of all nominees in Asian category. Selling more than 450,000 copies, the album was one of the top-selling albums of 2006 and was certified triple platinum.

In 2005, Mo appeared in the Taiwanese drama The Hospital, co-starring with Jerry Yan, a member of the Taiwanese boyband F4. She also appeared with Peter Ho in several episodes of the Taiwanese drama Romance in the White House, and starred in two TV series, Ku T'lah Jatuh Cinta and Pink. In 2006, she starred in a TV series, Kawin Muda. In the same year, she decided to take a break from her study in Pelita Harapan University to focus on her career.

=== 2007–2010: Sacredly Agnezious and Indonesian Idol ===
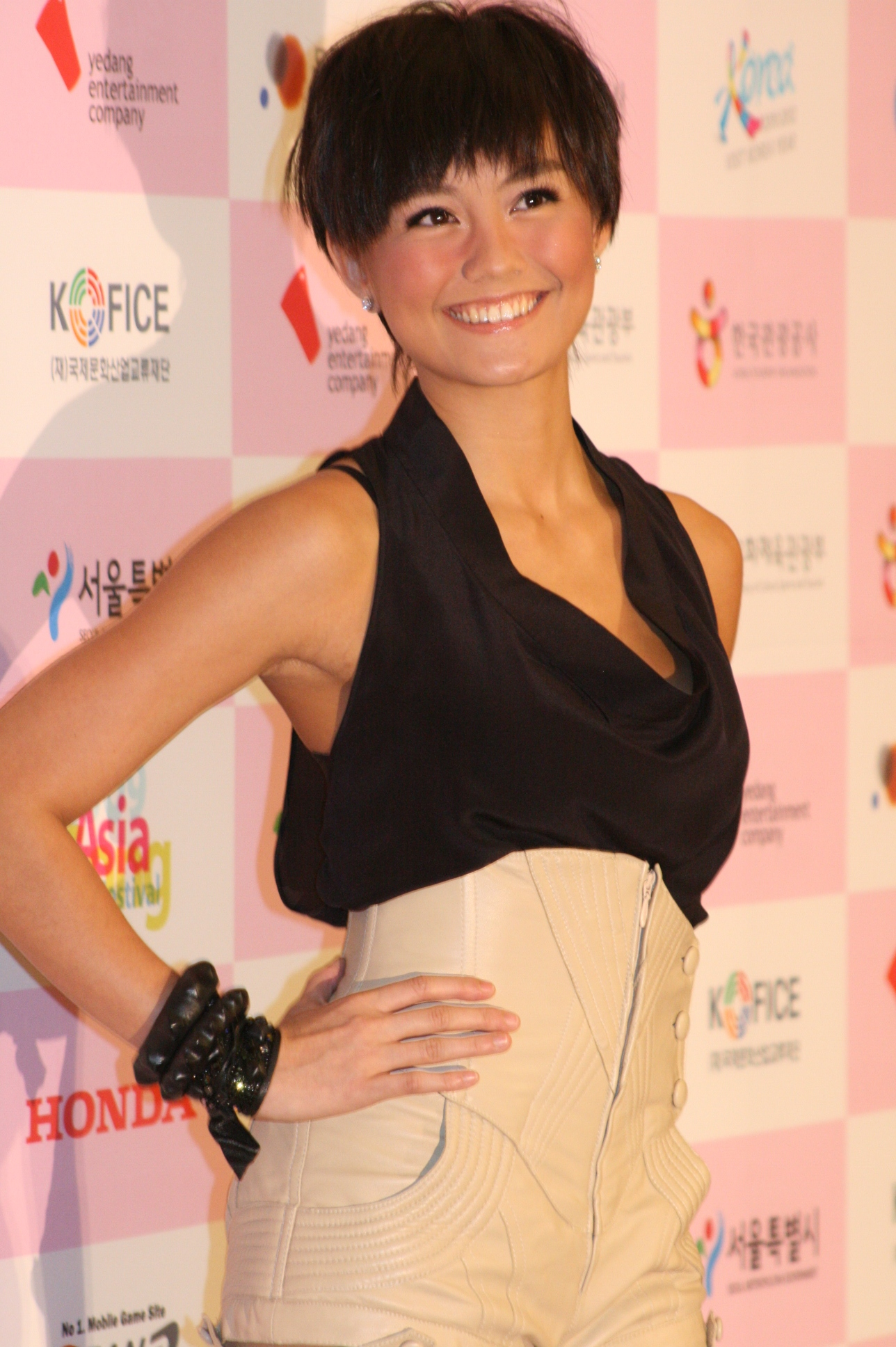
Mo on the red carpet 2009 Asia Song Festival in Seoul, South Korea.

In early 2007, Mo was appointed by the Drug Enforcement Administration (DEA) and the International Drug Enforcement Conference (IDEC) Far East Region as an Asian anti-drug ambassador. On 15 May 2007, Mo was an opening act for American R&B group Boyz II Men, at a concert in Istora Senayan, Jakarta, and on 23 June of that year, she held her first concert at Stadium Negara in Kuala Lumpur, Malaysia. She also guest starred in the finale of Asian Idol on 16 December 2007, and performed the song "Get Up".

While working on her third studio album in 2008, Mo released its first single, "Matahariku", earlier than she had planned. It became her best-selling single, with sales of its ringback tone reaching three million within nine months. The song received the "Most Favorite Female" award at the 2008 MTV Indonesia Awards and the "Best Female Solo Pop Artist" award at the 2009 Anugerah Musik Indonesia. In September 2008, Mo released the second single, "Godai Aku Lagi", which she wrote herself. She also released a CD single containing the two songs, which was an uncommon release format in Indonesia at the time. That same year, she starred in two RCTI soap operas, Jelita and Kawin Masal.

On 4 October 2008, Mo was invited as the Indonesian representative to the Asia Song Festival in Seoul, South Korea. She performed with 24 artists from 12 Asian countries at the Seoul World Cup Stadium. The event was broadcast to 30 countries. She performed two songs from her upcoming album, "Godai Aku Lagi" and "Shake It Off". During the performance, she incorporated elements of Indonesian traditional dance from Bali. Her performance received positive responses from the Korean media and won the committee's "Best Asian Artist Award". The following year, Agnes Monica was invited again alongside 14 Asian artists and performed three songs: "Shake It Off", "Temperature", and Michael Jackson's song "Heal the World". She received good reviews and was awarded the Best Asian Artist Award.

Mo launched her third studio album on 1 April 2009, Sacredly Agnezious. This time she was more involved in the production process of the album. She worked with renowned musicians Erwin Gutawa, Dewiq, Pay, and DJ Sumantri and also acted as producer and songwriter. In addition to "Matahariku" and "Godai Aku Lagi", the album yielded two more singles: "Teruskanlah" and "Janji - Janji". Later she won three awards at the 2010 Anugerah Musik Indonesia; Best Pop Album, Best Female Pop Solo Artist, and Best of the Best Album. On 23 May 2009, Agnes Monica appeared as a guest star at the "Festival of Life" in Garuda Wisnu Kencana, Bali, to commemorate the 50-year anniversary of the establishment of diplomatic relations between Indonesia and Japan.

In 2010, Mo joined the judging panel of the season 6 of Indonesian Idol. That year, she was also appointed as an ambassador of the MTV EXIT (End Exploitation and Trafficking) organisation, which combats human trafficking. In addition to her role as a spokesperson of MTV Exit Indonesia, she also performed at concerts in Surabaya and Jakarta. In late 2010, Mo was chosen as an international red carpet host for the annual American Music Awards On 21 November 2010 at the Nokia Theatre in Los Angeles.

=== 2011–2014: Agnez Mo and international debut ===
In February 2011, Mo announced that she had signed to Sony/ATV Music Publishing. She recorded a duet version of "Said I Loved You...But I Lied" with American singer Michael Bolton, for the Asian edition of his compilation album, Gems: The Duets Album. She was chosen to perform for the 26th SEA Games 2011 Opening Ceremony, with KC Concepcion from the Philippines and the Malaysian singer, Jaclyn Victor. Their performance of "Together We Will Shine" was the highlight of the event.

Marking a 10-year relationship with Aquarius Musikindo, Mo released her first greatest hits album, Agnes Is My Name, on 2 February 2011. The album compiled ten hit singles of during the 2000s with two new songs, "Karena Ku Sanggup" and "Paralyzed". The album was sold via Indonesian chains of fast-food restaurant KFC (Kentucky Fried Chicken), where the CD was bundled with chicken package purchase. This marketing strategy boosted the album sales to one million copies within three months, earning her the Million Award. She followed it with two non-album singles, "Rindu" and "Muda (Le O Le O)"; the later was free to download for simPATI subscribers.

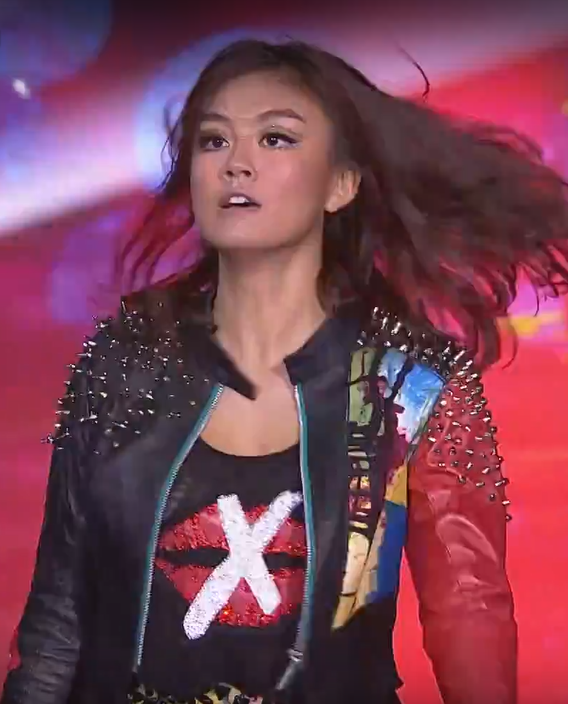
Mo performing on NET. TV channel grand launching, May 2013.

Mo won Anugerah Musik Indonesia for Best Female Pop Artist category for two consecutive years, in 2011 with "Karena Ku Sanggup" and in 2012 with "Paralyzed". She was among the Worldwide Acts Asia Pacific nominees for the 2011 MTV Europe Music Awards. The next year, she won the Mnet Asian Music Awards for Best Asian Artist from Indonesia and the Shorty Awards for The Shorty Vox Populi Award. She was also nominated for Favorite Asian Act at the 2012 Nickelodeon Kids' Choice Awards.

Mo starred in soap operas Marisa (2011) and Mimo Ketemu Poscha (2012). She continued becoming the judge for the season 7 of Indonesian Idol (2012) and NET's talent show named after her, Nez Academy (2013). In December 2012, she gave the opening and closing speeches at UN Global Youth Forum in Bali, Indonesia, as well as performing her unreleased song "Show a Little Love" with American rapper Timbaland. They also performed the song at the pre-Grammy launch party in Los Angeles.

On 1 June 2013, Mo released her first English studio album, Agnez Mo, on which she rebranded herself with a new stage name. Produced by Tearce Kizzo, it is her first album where she co-wrote all the songs. The album was originally recorded as her demo which was sent out to record labels in the United States in order to secure a deal for her international debut. Agnez Mo was first released digitally for Indonesian market only via Souniq Music (bundled with local coffee brand, Kopi Kapal Api) in June 2013. Two months later, the album was available on CDs distributed in Indomaret. She also released her first-ever "eau de perfume" line, Rêve, meaning "Dream" in French.

Mo landed her US record deal with The Cherry Party, a then-new label ventured with Sony Music Entertainment. Her first international single, "Coke Bottle", featuring Timbaland and T.I., premiered in September 2013 in a hip hop radio station in Los Angeles, Power 106 FM. "Coke Bottle" was released digitally on 8 April 2014, and was serviced to urban radio stations in the United States on 20 April. The song became a top-ten hit on Asia Pop 40 and was voted as MTV Iggy's Song of the Summer. Although "Coke Bottle" failed to enter any Billboard charts, Mo herself reached number 28 on the Billboard Uncharted. In November 2014, it was announced that she had joined the Wright Entertainment Group, a management company owned by Johnny Wright.

=== 2015–2023: The Voice Indonesia and X ===
In 2015, Mo wrote and produced the single "Vroom Vroom" for her niece, Chloe X. She also produced The Freaks, a singing group which consisted of four Indonesian young stars, who released their self-titled album on 30 June 2015. In September 2015, Mo read the Declaration of Peace Movement, which titled the 'Oath of Love', in Jakarta City Hall as a celebration of International Day of Peace. She released the single "I #AM Generation of Love" as part of the campaign which premiered on 250 radio stations in Indonesia. Her second international single, "Boy Magnet", was released with five remixes on 13 November 2015. It became Mo's first Billboard chart entry, reaching number 52 on the Dance Club Songs. Mo joined the coaching panel of the season 2 of The Voice Indonesia in 2016, as well as the season 1 to 3 of The Voice Kids Indonesia between 2016 and 2018.

Originally planned for early 2016 release, Mo's debut international album was scrapped by The Cherry Party. She later recorded another album, titled X, and released it independently on 10 October 2017. The album was supported by singles "Long As I Get Paid", "Damn I Love You", and "Wanna Be Loved". In November 2017, Mo was a guest star on AOL live interview program BUILD Series and on MTV's program TRL. She performed at the 2017 Mnet Asian Music Awards in Vietnam, where she received the award as Indonesia's Best Asian Artist. In December 2017, Mo announced that she was featured on Chris Brown's song "On Purpose" for the deluxe edition of his album Heartbreak on a Full Moon.

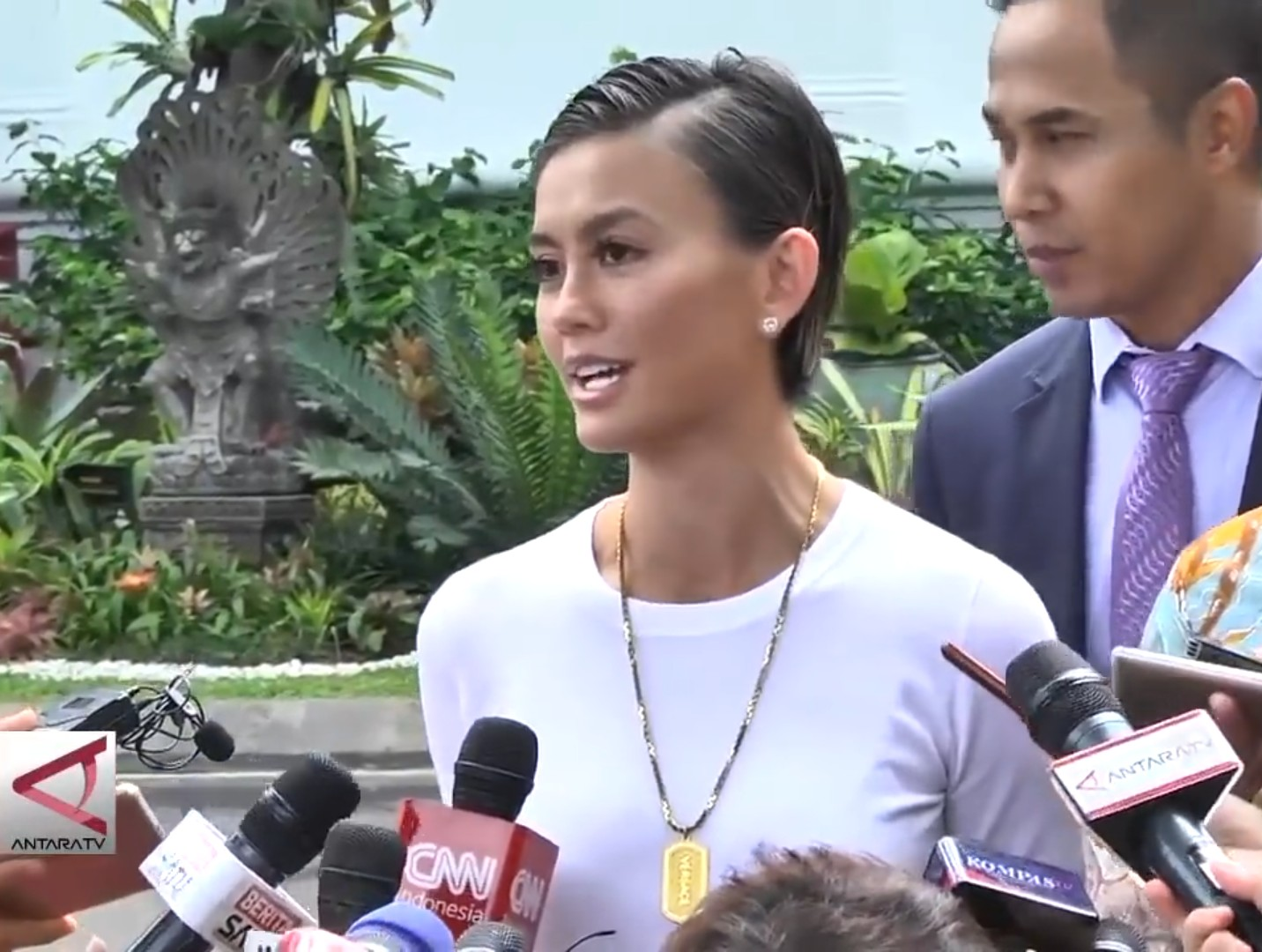
Mo in an interview at the Indonesian State Palace, 2023

On 25 April 2018, it was announced that Mo had signed her second US deal with 300 Entertainment. Her second collaboration with Brown, "Overdose", was released as her first single under the label on 26 July 2018. It entered four Billboard charts, peaking at number 31 on the R&B/Hip-Hop Airplay, number 36 on the Rhythmic Songs, number 24 on the Hot R&B Songs, and number 28 on the Mainstream R&B/Hip-Hop. She was chosen as Artist of the Week on Billboard Vietnam on 16 November 2018. She was later featured on iHeartRadio's On The Verge Artist and perform live on iHeartRadio YouTube channel in October 2018. At the 2019 iHeartRadio Music Awards, Mo won the Social Star Award.

Through 2019, Mo released two more singles under 300 Entertainment, "Diamonds" (featuring French Montana) and "Nanana". In August 2019, she appeared in Megan Thee Stallion's music video for "Hot Girl Summer". In 2020, Mo became an unsigned artist and released standalone singles "Promises" and "Fuckin' Boyfriend". She collaborated with Steve Aoki and Desiigner on the single "Girl" for Aoki's 2020 album Neon Future IV. In 2021, she released the single "F Yo Love Song" and launched an international graphic comic titled "Don't Wake Up" published by z2 Comic.

In 2022, Mo released the single "Patience", which charted at number 11 on the Billboard Adult R&B Songs and became her second top 40 entry on the R&B/Hip-Hop Airplay chart. On the year-end charts, Billboard ranked it as the 37th biggest Adult R&B song of 2022. It was placed at number 14 on iHeartRadio's Top R&B Song of 2022. The next year, she released "Get Loose", a duet with Ciara. She performed the song at the Recording Academy's series Global Spin in September 2023. Mo also made a pre-show performance of the iHeartRadio Music Festival on 22 September 2003, at T-Mobile Arena, Las Vegas. In December 2023, she participated on "Lasting Legacy", the official song of the 2023 United Nations Climate Change Conference.

=== 2024–present: Upcoming third English album and Reacher ===
In 2024, Mo released the single "Party in Bali (PIB)", which was also available on a remix version with South Korean rapper Jay Park. She also collaborated with the Pinoy pop girl group Bini for a remix of the latter's single "Cherry on Top", which was released on 3 October. In an interview at the Billboard No. 1s Party 2024, Mo revealed that she had already completed two studio albums planned for 2025 release. In June 2025, Mo announced that she was cast as Lila Hoth, the secondary antagonist for the season 4 of Amazon Prime series Reacher.

== Artistry ==
Her songs can be classified as pop. She has stated that Aretha Franklin, Madonna, and Michael Jackson have influenced her music. Mo also drew inspirations from Britney Spears, Christina Aguilera, Pink, Brandy Norwood, Mariah Carey, Janet Jackson, Justin Timberlake, Nelly Furtado, Rihanna, Beyoncé, Alicia Keys, Aaliyah, Lauryn Hill, and TLC. In addition to her singing skills, Mo is also known as excellent dancer and actress. She is the only Indonesian soloist with a personal dance group, known as Nezindahood. They auditioned during the development of her first album in 2003. She has also written some of her songs and produced her own music videos. She has been described as a perfectionist with a variety of talents by music critics.

Throughout her career, Mo has often been deemed controversial in Indonesia. When she was a teenager, her frequent comments about her goal to break into the international market was viewed by some as a pompous proclamation. In 2010, however, she began working on a debut English studio album. Her slogan "Dream, Believe, and Make it Happen" was used in a 2011 cultural conference to inspire young people organised by the US Embassy in Jakarta.

== Awards and nominations ==
Mo is the most-awarded Indonesian singer, whose domestic awards include 18 Anugerah Musik Indonesia, 8 Panasonic Awards, 5 Nickelodeon Indonesia Kids' Choice Awards, and 4 MTV Indonesia Awards. She has also received international awards, including 1 Anugerah Planet Muzik, 3 Asia Song Festival. For her contribution and support to Indonesian music, Mo was honoured the 2011 Nugraha Bhakti Musik Indonesia (NBMI) award from The Minister of Culture and Tourism, and Association of Indonesian Singers, Songwriters And Music Record Producers. In 2020, Mo was listed as one of the 10 highlighted figures on Forbes Asia's 100 Digital Stars: Asia-Pacific's Most Influential Celebrities on Social Media. Mo became the first Indonesian artist to be immortalised in multiple wax statues by Madame Tussauds—in its Singapore, Hong Kong, and Hollywood museums.

== Personal life ==
During her career, Mo has kept her personal life private and relationships private, often stating that dating is not her priority. She also stated that personal relationships of all public figures should remain private.

== Discography ==
Main studio albums

- And the Story Goes (2003)
- Whaddup A.. '?! (2005)
- Sacredly Agnezious (2009)
- Agnez Mo (2013)
- X (2017)

Children's studio albums

- Si Meong (1994)
- Yess! (1995)
- Bala-Bala (1998)
- Tra La La Tri Li Li (1999)

== Filmography ==
Year	Title	Role	Notes
1994	VAN (Video Anak Anteve)	Host	Variety show
1997–2001	Tralala - Trilili	Host; Won - 1999 Panasonic Awards for Favorite Female Kids Show Presenter; Won - 2000 Panasonic Awards for Favorite Female Kids Show Presenter	Variety show
1999	Lupus Millenia	Lulu	Supporting role
1999	Mr. Hologram	Putri	Lead role
2001–2002	Pernikahan Dini	Dini	Lead role Won - 2001 Panasonic Awards for Favorite Drama Series Program; Won - 2001 Panasonic Awards for Favorite Actress; Won - 2002 Panasonic Awards for Favorite Actress
2002	Kejarlah Daku Kau Ku Tangkap	Ramona	Lead role Won - 2002 SCTV Awards for Famous Actress; Nominated - 2003 SCTV Awards for Famous Actress
2002	Amanda	Amanda	Lead role
2002	Ciuman Pertama	Chelsea	Lead role
2002	Cinta Selembut Awan	Melati	Lead role
2002	Diva Romeo	Host	Variety show
2003	Cewekku Jutek	Zie	Lead role Won - 2003 Panasonic Awards for Favorite Actress
2004	Cantik	Julie	Lead role Nominated - 2004 Panasonic Awards for Favorite Actress; Won - 2004 SCTV Awards for Famous Actress; Won - 2005 SCTV Awards for Famous Actress
2004	Bunga Perawan	Novia	Lead role
2005	Ku T'lah Jatuh Cinta	Riby	Lead role Nominated - 2005 Panasonic Awards for Favorite Actress
2005	MTV Ampuh	Guest host	Variety show
2006	Pink	Pink	Lead role Won - 2006 Panasonic Awards for Favorite Actress
2006	Romance in the White House	Po Ni	Taiwanese drama (cameo, supporting role)
2006	The Hospital	Zhang Mei Xin	Taiwanese drama (cameo, supporting role)
2006–2007	Kawin Muda	Sera	Lead role Won - 2007 Panasonic Awards for Favorite Actress
2008	Jelita	Jelita	Lead role
2008	Kawin Masal	Sachiko	Lead role
2010–2011	Indonesian Idol	Judge	Variety show; 2 seasons
2010	American Music Awards	Special abroad guest host	Variety show
2010	Pejantan Cantik	Marisa	Lead role Nominated - 2011 Panasonic Gobel Awards for Favorite Actress
2011	Marisa	Marisa	Lead role Won - 2011 Festival Film Bandung for The Commendable Female Main Character
2012	Mimo Ketemu Poscha	Mimo	Lead role Won – 2012 Festival Film Bandung for The Commendable Female Main Character; Nominated - 2013 Panasonic Gobel Awards for Favorite Actress
2013	Nez Academy	Judge	Variety show
2015	La Academia Junior Indonesia	Guest Judge	Variety show; Season 2
2016	The Voice Indonesia	Judge	Variety show; Season 2
2016–2018	The Voice Kids Indonesia	Judge	3 seasons; Won - 2018 Indonesian Television Awards for Most Popular Judge for Talent Search Program
2026	Reacher	Lila Hoth	Season 4
TBA	Groove Tails †		Film debut; voice

Key
†	Denotes films that have not yet been released

== Cited sources ==
- Cordova, Cozy (2007). Jangan Mau Jadi Cewek Biasa: Muda, Kaya, Ternama! Bagaimana Bisa?. Kawan Pustaka. ISBN 978-979-757-215-0.
- Karsito, Eddie (2008). Menjadi Bintang: Kiat Sukses Jadi Artis Panggung, Film, dan Televisi. Ufuk Publishing House. ISBN 9786028224338.
- Putranto, Wendi (2009). Rolling Stone Muc Biz: Manual Cerdas Menguasai Bisnis Musik. PT Mizan Publika. ISBN 978-979-24-3867-3.
