= Cewekku Jutek =

Indonesian TV series

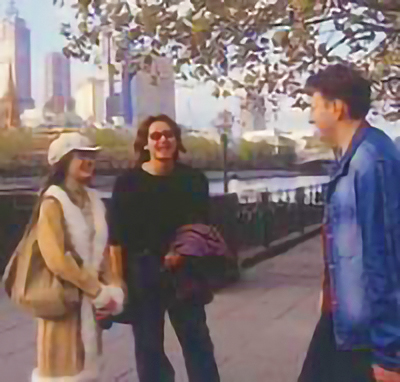
- Shooting Cewekku Jutek in Melbourne
- Starring: Agnes Mo, Roger Danuarta, Poppy Maretha
- Opening theme: Indah, by Agnes Monica
- Ending theme: Indah, by Agnes Monica
- Country of origin: Indonesia
- Original language: Indonesian
- No. of episodes: 28

Production
- Producer: G. Sulaiman
- Production locations: Jakarta, Melbourne, Dandenong Ranges, Port Campbell National Park, Ballarat
- Running time: 1 Hour
- Production companies: RCTI, Prima Entertainment

Original release
- Network: RCTI
- Release: May 25 – November 30, 2003

Cewekku Jutek (English translation: My girlfriend is a snob, or My girl is snobby) is a soap opera that aired on RCTI in 2003. The soap opera starred Agnes Monica and Roger Danuarta. This soap opera has won at the Panasonic Awards as category "Favourite Actress" in 2003.

== Synopsis ==
In this soap opera Agnes Monica plays a high school girl named Zie who has a snobby personality and is quick to anger. Luckily she meets Joe, played by Roger Danuarta and little by little her attitude improves.

This soap opera aired on RCTI and produced by Prima Entertainment.

== Cast ==
- Agnes Monica as Zie.
- Roger Danuarta as Joe.
- Poppy Maretha

== Theme song ==
The single "Indah", sung by Agnes Monica, became the opening theme and ending theme in the soap opera.

== Award ==
| Year | Award | Category | Recipients | Results |
|---|---|---|---|---|
| 2003 | Panasonic Awards | Most Favourite Actress | Agnes Monica | Won |
