= Tipe-X =

Ska band in Jakarta, Indonesia

- Origin: Jakarta, Indonesia
- Genre: Ska
- Years active: 1995-present
- Labels: Pops Musik, Aquarius Musikindo, Michelin Records, Offbeat Music Records, Bahaya Records & Favorite Records
- Members: Tresno Riadi (lead vocal); Micky (bass); Yoss (guitar); Arie Hardjo (drum); Billy (guitar); Anto (trombone)
- Past members: Andi Toha (saxophone, trumpet); Hendro (drum); Aditya Pratama (drum)
- Website: Tipe-X on Instagram

Tipe-X (English: Type-X) is an Indonesian ska band formed in 1995 in Jakarta. The group consists of Tresno Riadi (vocals), Micky (bass), Yoss (guitar), Arie Hardjo (drums), Billy (guitar), and Anto (trombone)

As of 2026, the group has released eight studio albums and one compilation album. They are best known in Indonesia for songs such as "Genit", "Angan", "Song From Distance", "Salam Rindu", "Sakit Hati", "Selamat Jalan", "Kamu Ngga Sendiran", and "Mawar Hitam".

== History ==
=== Formation (1995–1998) ===
The group originally formed in 1992 under the name "Headmaster", but later renamed themselves as "Tipe-X" since September 1995, citing that the name was easier to remember. This group consists of Tresno (vocal), Micky (bass), Yoss (guitar), Billy (guitar), Arie (drum) and Anto (trombone). Initially, the group's live repertoire primarily consisted of cover songs of popular foreign ska punk bands such as Voodoo Glow Skull, Operation Ivy, and The Mighty-Mighty Bosstones, but later incorporated original material written by the band.

Tipe-X began to play underground venues and music festivals in the Jakarta region, with the group winning "favourite" of the 1995 Alternative Music Festival in Menteng. This newfound confidence saw the group produce several demo recordings, with "Frustasi" being sent to and aired on Indosiar's "Expresi" program. Additionally, a demo recording of "Bebas" was also sent to IndieLapan's Prambors. This minor success resulted in the group attracting offers from Indonesian music labels, notably Pops Musik, who would release the band's studio material until 2009's Festival Perasaan.

=== Ska Phobia (1999) ===
The group's debut album Ska Phobia was released in June 1999 alongside the singles "Genit" and "Angan". The album contained ten tracks, with three being sung in English. Ska Phobia recorded over 380,000 sales and was certified double platinum.

=== Mereka Tak Pernah Mengerti (2001–2002) ===
The band released their second album Mereka Tak Pernah Mengerti in 2001. Supporting the album's release included the singles "Salam Rindu", "Sakit Hati" and "Selamat Jalan", each of which had an accompanying music video. Commercially, Mereka Tak Pernah Mengerti is the band's most successful album, selling over 500,000 copies and being certified triple platinum.

2002 marked the departure of the group's original drummer Hendro, who was subsequently replaced by Aditya Pratma, also known as Adi.

=== Super Surprise (2003–2004) ===
Tipe-X's third album, Super Surprise, released in 2003 alongside the singles "Karena Cemburu", "Gombal" and "Pacar Yang Baik". The album was positively received by the band's fanbase (dubbed "X-Friends"), resulting in over 150,000 sales and being certified platinum.

=== Discography Hitam Putih (2005–2006) ===
In commemoration of the band's 10-year anniversary, 2005 saw the release of Tipe-X's fourth album, Discography Hitam Putih. "Kamu Ngga' Sendirian" served as the album's lead single, with "Mawar Hitam" following. In total, the album recorded over 120,000 sales.

=== The Journey (2007–2008) ===
The band's first compilation album, A Journey, was released in 2007. The album, which was the band's last to be released on the Pops Musik label, served as a collection of the group's most famous hits and included tracks such as "Sakit Hati", "Genit", "Salam Rindu" and "Mawar Hitam". Additionally, the album also featured new material such as the Riadi-penned "Kamu Penipu", which served as the album's leading single. A Journey accumulated over 120,000 sales.

After the album's release, drummer Adi departed Tipe-X and instead joined ADA Band, who he continues to play with.

=== Festival Perasaan (2009–2011) ===
In 2009, the band released their sixth full-length album, Festival Perasaan, through Michelin Records. At this point, the band did not have a permanent drummer due to Adi's departure. The album was supported by the leading single "Ciuman Pertama" which featured Canadian singer Chelssie Baker and Indonesian drummer Marcell Siahaan. Two further singles in the form of "Saat Saat" Menyebalkan" and "Cinta Sederhana" were released to support the album.

=== Seven (2012–present) ===
Marking an end to the band's hiatius, 2012 marked the release of Tipe-X's seventh album aptly titled "Seven". The album was released by the Offbeat Music label, whose owner, Benjamin Renhat, also served as the producer. "Boyband" was released as the album's lead single and saw a resurgence in the band's popularity. Seven was notable for featuring Arie Hardjo as the group's new drummer. Hardjo, who had supported the group on tour since 2008, had previously been a part of rock band U'Camp. Additionally, saxophonist Andi Toha left the band after the release of Seven.

In 2017, the band released a biography entitled "1999".

== Band members ==
=== Current lineup ===
- Tresno Riadi – lead vocals (1995-present)
- Billy – lead guitar, backing vocals (1995-present)
- Yoss – rhythm guitar, backing vocals (1995-present)
- Micky – bass (1995-present)
- Anto – trombone (1995-present)
- Arie Hardjo – drums, percussion (2009-present)

=== Past members ===
- Andi Toha – saxophones (2001-2011); trumpet (1995-2011)
- Hendro – drums, percussion (1995-2002)
- Aditya Pratama – drums, percussion (2002-2008)

== Discography ==
Year	Album
1999	Ska Phobia
2001	Mereka Tak Pernah Mengerti
2003	Super Surprise
2005	Discography Hitam Putih
2007	A Journey
2009	Festival Perasaan
2012	Seven
2025	Tanda Istimewa
