= Whaddup A.. '?! =

Studio album by Agnes Monica
- Released: December 10, 2005
- Recorded: 2005
- Genres: R&B, pop, urban
- Length: 51:29
- Label: Aquarius Musikindo
- Producers: Ari Bias, Yudis Dwikorana, Valent, Dewiq, Melly Goeslaw, Keith Martin, Andi Rianto

Agnes Monica chronology
And the Story Goes (2003)	Whaddup A.. '?! (2005)	Sacredly Agnezious (2009)

Singles from Whaddup A.. '?!
- 1. "Bukan Milikmu Lagi" Released: October 18, 2005; 2. "Tanpa Kekasihku" Released: January 9, 2006; 3. "Tak Ada Logika" Released: June 14, 2006; 4. "Cinta Diujung Jalan" Released: October 10, 2006; 5. "Dan Tak Mungkin" Released: January 30, 2007

Whaddup A.. '?! is the sixth studio album by Indonesian singer Agnes Monica, released in 2005. The album got triple platinum with collaboration from American singer-songwriter, Keith Martin. This album shown the transformation from her 'teenage singer' persona, to a more mature concept. This album was also named as the best album of its era. It became her most experimental album, which included many genres, Pop, R&B, urban and dance-pop including pop rock and power ballad, also Eastern sounds. Despite having no album promotions in Malaysia, her album, Whaddup A’.. ?! was still a huge success which caused the album to be re-released with the new concept, and VCD bonus.

== Singles ==
=== "Bukan Milikmu Lagi" ===
"Bukan Milikmu Lagi" (English: Not Yours Anymore) was the first single released off from the album. In this urban/dance-pop song, the singer angers her lover thus he is 'not hers anymore'. However she notices that the life will not end even the relationship has ended. The music video features Agnes and her dancers in a factory in a region called NEZville.

=== "Tanpa Kekasihku" ===
"Tanpa Kekasihku" (English: Without My Lover) was released as the second single from the album. The pop rock ballad was penned by Indonesian songwriter, Dewiq, in which its protagonist laments the death of her lover and says that life becomes useless without him. The music video features Agnes standing in a window of a building, seemingly intending to jump, with flashback scenes of her with her late love interest. The relationship is romantic, however Agnes is somehow disappointed with her lover and runs. Her lover follows her, accidentally they meet a villain in which her love is killed. Agnes laments the death of her boyfriend. In the end of the music video, however, Agnes does not jump from the building and goes back.

=== "Tak Ada Logika" ===
"Tak Ada Logika" (English: No Logic) is a dance pop song incorporating with R&B and Arabic music elements. The song was released as the third single, and instantly became a hit and one of her several signature songs. The song won multiple awards, most notably Anugerah Musik Indonesia, which it won in Best R&B Production for Solo, Duo, or Group category. Agnes hits A_{5} in full chest voice.

== Accolades ==
At the 10th Annual Anugerah Musik Indonesia, the album and single earned most nominations with ten and winning four awards, including Best Pop Female Solo Artist for "Tanpa Kekasihku", Best R&B Production Work for "Bukan Milikmu Lagi", etc. and nominated for Best Pop Album and Best of the Best Album. A single "Tak Ada Logika" managing to earning a Most Favorite Female award and nominated for Best Video of the Year at the 2006 MTV Indonesia Awards.

== Track listing ==
No.	Title	Writer(s)	Producer	Length
1.	"Ku Disini"	Ari Bias	Ari Bias	03:54
2.	"Tak Ada Logika"	Yudis Dwikorana, Yoyo	Yudis Dwikorana	03:35
3.	"Dan Tak Mungkin"	Valent	Andi Rianto	04:15
4.	"Tanpa Kekasihku"	Dewiq	Erwin Gutawa	05:33
5.	"Kamu dan Kamu"	Melly Goeslaw	Anto Hoed	03:40
6.	"Get Up"	Keith Martin, Jason Balibay	Keith Martin	04:22
7.	"Bukan Milikmu Lagi"	Ari Bias, Mufari	Dodi SS Nay & Agus Hardiman	03:37
8.	"Tak 'Kan Sampai Disini"	Ari Bias, Mufari	Ari Bias	03:32
9.	"Cinta Di Ujung Jalan"	Dewiq	Pay	04:53
10.	"What They Called Soulmate"	Andi Rianto, Agnes Monica	Andi Rianto	04:13
11.	"Salah Jatuh Cinta"	Melly Goeslaw	Anto Hoed	04:23
12.	"I'll Light a Candle" (featuring Keith Martin)	Keith Martin, Diana S. Dayao	Keith Martin	05:32
Total length:				51:29
