= Agnez Mo (album) =

2013 international studio album by Agnez Mo

Studio album by Agnez Mo
- Released: 1 June 2013
- Recorded: 2011–2012
- Genre: R&B; soul; electro-R&B
- Length: 37:41
- Label: Entertainment Inc.
- Producer: Tearce Kizzo

Agnez Mo chronology
Agnes Is My Name (2011)	Agnez Mo (2013)	X (2017)

Singles from Agnez Mo
- 1. "Walk" Released: 1 June 2013

Agnez Mo (reissued as Shut 'Em Up) is the eighth studio album and the first English album by Indonesian pop singer Agnez Mo. It was released on 1 June 2013 by Entertainment Inc. via Souniq Music, a then-new music streaming service in the Southeast Asia region. The album consists of 11 songs, including the singles Walk, Renegade and Bad Girl.

The album was originally recorded as her demo CD to be sent out to the record labels in the States. Later, she secured a deal with Indomaret and Kopi Kapal Api to distribute the album exclusively to the Indonesian market.

The album was re-released digitally on all digital music platforms 10 years later with the title Shut 'Em Up on 21 July 2023 with a different track list arrangement and a new cover artwork.

== Singles ==
The first single, "Walk", was released on 1 June 2013 with simPATI and peaked at number one on the Rolling Stone Indonesia.

The video was made as a project called "Walk with simPATI" which involved various contributions from fans. The video was uploaded on 20 June 2013 through YouTube and has been viewed for more than 2.2 million.

== Music video ==
Music video of "Walk" was released on 1 June 2013. This music video was made with various videos uploaded from many of her fans as the background who have co-participated in the project of making the music video "Walk" by uploading videos on the Telkomsel website. The official music video of "Walk" can be watched on YouTube apps.

== Track listing ==
Souniq Music Apps., Digital Download Version
No.	Title	Writer(s)	Producer(s)	Length
1.	"Hide & Seek"	Agnes Monica, Francesca Maeondra Richard, Vincent Romane Shaw	Tearce Kizzo	3.48
2.	"Walk"	Monica, H2OLife, Richard	Tearce Kizzo	3.20
3.	"Bad Girl"	Monica, Richard, Shaw	Tearce Kizzo	3.55
4.	"Flyin' High"	Monica, Richard	Tearce Kizzo	2.53
5.	"Got Me Figured Out"	Monica, Justin Truggman, Richard	Tearce Kizzo	3.48
6.	"Things Will Get Better"	Monica, Corey Chorus, Richard	Tearce Kizzo	4.07
7.	"Renegade"	Monica, Wizz Dumb, Richard, Tierce A. Person	Tearce Kizzo	3.23
8.	"Be Brave"	Monica, Timbaland, Wizz Dumb, Richard	Tearce Kizzo	3.49
9.	"Let's Fall in Love Again"	Monica, Truggman, Richard	Tearce Kizzo	3.17
10.	"Shut 'Em Up"	Monica, H2OLife, Kizzo, Richard	Tearce Kizzo	2.55
Total length:				35.19

Indomaret Released CD Version
No.	Title	Writer(s)	Producer(s)	Length
1.	"Walk"	Agnes Monica, H2Olife, Francesca Maeondra Richard	Tearce Kizzo	3.13
2.	"Renegade"	Monica, Wizz Dumb, Richard, Tierce A. Person	Tearce Kizzo	3.17
3.	"Bad Girl"	Monica, Richard, Vincent Romane Shaw	Tearce Kizzo	3.49
4.	"Let's Fall in Love Again"	Monica, Justin Truggman, Richard	Tearce Kizzo	3.11
5.	"Be Brave"	Monica, Timbaland, Wizz Dumb, Richard	Tearce Kizzo	3.45
6.	"Flyin' High"	Monica, Richard	Tearce Kizzo	2.50
7.	"Shut 'Em Up"	Monica, H2OLife, Kizzo, Richard	Tearce Kizzo	2.52
8.	"Hide & Seek"	Monica, Richard, Shaw	Tearce Kizzo	3.41
9.	"Got Me Figured Out"	Monica, Truggman, Richard	Tearce Kizzo	3.44
10.	"Things Will Get Better"	Monica, Corey Chorus, Richard	Tearce Kizzo	4.04
11.	"Let's Fall in Love Again (alt. Vocal) [Bonus Track]"	Monica, Truggman, Richard	Tearce Kizzo	3.10
Total length:				37.41

Shut ‘Em Up Version
No.	Title	Writer(s)	Producer(s)	Length
1.	"Hide & Seek"	Agnes Monica, Francesca Maeondra Richard, Vincent Romane Shaw	Tearce Kizzo	3.46
2.	"Walk"	Monica, H2OLife, Richard	Tearce Kizzo	3.18
3.	"Renegade"	Monica, Wizz Dumb, Richard, Tierce A. Person	Tearce Kizzo	3.22
4.	"Be Brave"	Monica, Timbaland, Wizz Dumb, Richard	Tearce Kizzo	3.47
5.	"Flyin' High"	Monica, Richard	Tearce Kizzo	2.51
6.	"Shut 'Em Up"	Monica, H2OLife, Kizzo, Richard	Tearce Kizzo	2.54
7.	"Bad Girl"	Monica, Richard, Shaw	Tearce Kizzo	3.23
8.	"Things Will Get Better"	Monica, Corey Chorus, Richard	Tearce Kizzo	4.05
9.	"Got Me Figured Out"	Monica, Justin Truggman, Richard	Tearce Kizzo	3.45
10.	"Let's Fall in Love Again"	Monica, Truggman, Richard	Tearce Kizzo	3.15
11.	"Let's Fall in Love Again (Indonesian Version)"	Monica, Truggman, Richard	Tearce Kizzo	3.15
