= Yana Julio =

Indonesian singer and musician

- Born: Yana Rusyana; April 8, 1960 (age 66)
- Origin: Bogor, Indonesia
- Genres: Pop, pop kreatif, soul
- Occupations: Singer, musician
- Years active: 1982-present

Yana Rusyana (born April 8, 1960), better known as Yana Julio, is an Indonesian singer and musician.

== Life and music career ==
He was born in Bogor, Indonesia, and educated at Bogor Agricultural University. He started his singing career as a member of Elfa's Singers.

He was awarded the AMI Award for Best Pop Male Solo Artist at the beginning of his career by Bintang Radio & TV Teen Regional II in Bogor. Julio also won the Popular Singing Festival in Bogor and DKI Jakarta as well as the ASEAN Popular Song Festival event in 1988 in Kuala Lumpur and in 1989 in Manila he was the runner up. Julio has also been Indonesia's ambassador for cultural exchanges with Europe on several occasions. He participated at the North Sea Jazz Festival in The Hague, the Netherlands and at the Thailand Jazz Festival in 1997.

He has released several single hits including "Soul Emotion" and "All I Am", which is a cover of the Heatwave song written by Lynsey de Paul and Susan Sheridan. His eight albums include Kucinta (1998), Meet Again (2002), Forever Love (1995) and Desire Love. He also featured as a vocalist on the song "Cinta Begini Adanya" on Andrea Cinta's self named 2007 album.
