= Boy Magnet =

Single by Agnez Mo
- Released: 13 November 2015
- Recorded: 2015
- Genre: EDM; R&B
- Length: 6:53
- Label: The Cherry Party
- Songwriter(s): Makeba Riddick; Jim Beanz

Agnez Mo singles chronology
"Coke Bottle" (2014)	"Boy Magnet" (2015)	"Sebuah Rasa" (2016)

"Boy Magnet" is the second international single by Indonesian singer Agnez Mo. It was released by The Cherry Party on 13 November 2015, with five remixes of the song being available for download. The song was remixed by Hector Fonseca, John Dish, Tommy Love and Xavi Alfaro, while the original version is expected to appear on her upcoming debut international album.

== Reception ==
In Indonesia, "Boy Magnet" remixes were only commercially released on iTunes Store and charted at number three on its chart. "Boy Magnet" make Agnez first Billboard charts the song chart in number 52 on the Billboard Dance Club Songs. Due to underwhelming response of the single, Agnez Mo's full-length international debut album—previously announced to be released in Spring 2016—was postponed. She eventually dropped out of The Cherry Party, and released her debut international album, X, in 2017.

== Remixes ==
- Digital remixes
1. "Boy Magnet" (John Dish Remix) – 5:26
2. "Boy Magnet" (Hector Fonseca Remix) – 4:17
3. "Boy Magnet" (Hector Fonseca & Tommy Love Radio Edit) – 3:53
4. "Boy Magnet" (Hector Fonseca & Tommy Love Tribal Dub) – 6:53
5. "Boy Magnet" (Xavi Alfaro Remix) – 6:07

== Charts ==
Chart (2015)	Peak position
US Dance Club Songs (Billboard) Breakout position outside Top 50	52
