= RRI Programa 2 =

- Type: Radio network
- Branding: Pro 2 RRI (alternative)
- Country: Indonesia
- First air date: 1990s
- Owner: RRI
- Former names: Pro2FM; RRI Programa II; Programa Kota (other names)
- Format: Rhythmic AC, Indo pop
- Sister stations: RRI Programa 1 RRI Programa 3 RRI Programa 4 RRI Programa 5 Voice of Indonesia
- Official website: RRI Programa 2 on RRI Digital
- Language: Indonesian

RRI Programa 2 Jakarta
- Central Jakarta, Jakarta; Indonesia
- Broadcast area: Jakarta metropolitan area
- Frequencies: 105.0 FM (analog); 229.072 (12D) (DAB+)

Programming
- Language: Indonesian
- Format: CHR/Top40, Indo pop

Ownership
- Owner: RRI (RRI Jakarta)
- Sister stations: RRI Pro 1 Jakarta; RRI Pro 4 Jakarta

History
- First air date: 1990s

Technical information
- Licensing authority: Ministry of Communication and Digital Affairs

Links
- Website: RRI Pro 2 Jakarta on RRI Digital

Additional information
- Satellite: Telkom-4: 3954 H (free-to-air)

Programa 2 Radio Republik Indonesia ('Programme 2 of the Radio Republik Indonesia'), known as RRI Programa 2, Pro 2 RRI, RRI Pro 2, or simply Pro 2, is an Indonesian radio network owned by the country's public radio broadcaster Radio Republik Indonesia (RRI). A youth-oriented network, it broadcasts popular music and entertainment programming in a networked system, with Jakarta station – operated by local broadcaster RRI Jakarta – being the flagship station. Its slogan is Teman Terbaik Kamu (Your Best Friend).

RRI Programa 2 is known for broadcasting Bintang Radio, the oldest singing competition in Indonesian broadcasting.

A Nielsen data in July–August 2024 shows that RRI Programa 2 in Greater Jakarta and Central Java – run by RRI stations in several cities – is the most popular RRI radio station in the respective regions, with listenership percentages of 4.4% and 9.6%, respectively. However, because "RRI" radio listeners are more numerous (8.8% and 18.4%, respectively), the RRI Programa 2 listeners could be higher.

== History ==
RRI Programa 2 logo used in 2006–2023

RRI Programa 2 logo in 2023–2024, still appears on the RRI website

RRI began developing Programa 2 in the early 1990s as the commercial network Programa 2 Nasional, or known as Pro2FM. Pro2FM was not bound by the old RRI conventions at the time on advertisement, and sought to cultivate a youthful image. At a time when private stations were not allowed to broadcast from outside their studios, Pro2FM purchased an OB van for live outside broadcasts. RRI "collaborated with a large private business conglomerate" in managing Pro2FM at that time, the details of which were not disclosed. Among those involved in establishing this network, according to sources, were Agung Laksono and Aburizal Bakrie. In the 2000s, the station was transformed into a youth-oriented entertainment station.
