= Davina Karamoy =

Indonesian actress

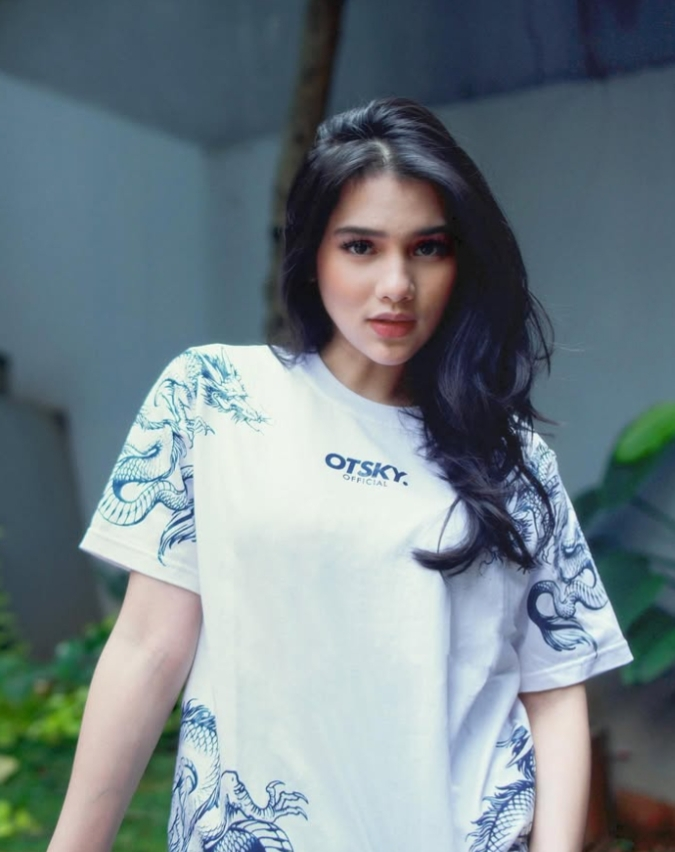
- Davina Karamoy in 2024
- Born: Davina Tesalonika Karamoy; August 17, 2002 (age 24); Jakarta, Indonesia
- Occupations: Celebrity, singer
- Years active: 2018–present

Davina Tesalonika Karamoy (born August 17, 2002) is an Indonesian actress and singer. Davina Karamoy started to become famous since playing the character Gisel on the series Tukang Ojek Pengkolan in 2018.

== Early life ==
Davina Karamoy is the third of five siblings. Both of her older and both of her younger siblings are twins. Her older twins are Sandri Karamoy and Sandro Karamoy, while her younger twins are named Serafina Belacia Karamoy and Winona Elysia Karamoy. Before Davina's birth, Davina's mother was pregnant with five fetuses, meaning Davina Karamoy also had four twin brothers, but two of them did not survive as fetuses and were declared dead due to not developing, while the other two died shortly after birth.

Davina Karamoy's father is a Protestant Christian and her mother's religion is Islam. She was raised as a in her father's religion and decided to convert to Islam while in Senior High School.

== Education ==
- Pancasila University, Bachelor of Law (resign)
- Binus University, Bachelor of Distance Learning Management (since 2024)

== Filmography ==
=== Films ===
Years	Titles	Roles	Notes
2019	Mata Batin 2	Syifa	
2019	Rumah Kentang: The Beginning	Nina	
2020	Di Bawah Umur	Asti	
2021	Geez & Ann	Dina	
2022	The Other Side	Alea	
2022	Ratu Dansa	Hana	
2023	Jin & Jun	Sarah	
2024	Ipar adalah Maut	Rani Nurul Azizah	
2024	Perewangan	Maya	
2025	Dendam Malam Kelam	Sarah Arudita / Lidya	
2025	Tak Ingin Usai di Sini	Vero Solaya	
2025	Kang Solah: From Kang Mak x Nenek Gayung	Dara Gonzalez	
2025	Kuncen	Diska	
2025	Ningsih: Dendam Arwah Penghuni Pabrik		
TBA	Andai Waktu Bisa Diulang Kembali	Dinar	

Key
†	Denotes films that have not yet been released

- TBA: To be announced

=== Television series ===
Years	Titles	Roles	Notes
2018	Tukang Ojek Pengkolan	Gisel	Her career debut
2020	Topan dan Aisyah	Renna	
2020	Sultan Aji	Bunga Ranti	
2022–2023	Amanah Wali 6	Maya	
2023	Sayap Cinta Terindah	Isyana Waranggana	

=== Web series ===
Years	Titles	Roles	Notes
2020	Ada Dewa di Sisiku	Aurel	
2021	7 Hari Sebelum 17 Tahun	Nelly Sukma	
2022	Geez & Ann the Series	Dina	
2023	Sajadah Panjang: Sujud dalam Doa	Renata	
2023	Mozachiko	Zetta Venica	
2023	Bad Boys vs Crazy Girls	Mikayla	Season 2
2025	Culture Shock	Sabrina	
2025	Main Hati	Angela Hariyadi	Series
2025—2026	Sugar Baby	Susan	Series
2026	Love & 10 Million Dollars	Elina Bamantara	Series

=== Music videos ===
Years	Titles	Singers	Notes
2024	"Tak Selalu Memiliki"	Lyodra	Theme song of Ipar adalah Maut
2024	"Terlalu Cinta"	Yovie Widianto and Lyodra	

=== Teĺevision films ===
- Love Language-ku Padamu, All You Can Eat (2022)
- Panggilan Cintanya Diangkat Dong (2022)
- Kejar Hatimu Sampai ke Penghulu (2022)
- Habis Dia, Terbitlah Kamu (2022)
- Soto Rasa Sayang yang Terabaikan (2022)
- Bongkar Cinta Pesulap Ganteng (2022)
- Jangan Ada PHK di Antara Kita (2022)
- Cinta Pangeran Anggur Pantang Dianggurin (2023)
- Ente Kadang-kadang Cilok (2023)
- Mamiku Rivalku (2023)
- Untuk Clara (2023)
- Rockdut in Love (2024)

== Discography ==
=== Singles ===
- "Notifikasi" – featuring Devano Danendra (theme song of Bad Boys vs Crazy Girls Season 2 2023)
- "Jatuh Sendiri" (2024)

== Awards and nominations ==
Years	Awards	Categories	Nominated works	Results
2024	Indonesian Movie Actors Awards	Best Supporting Actress	Ipar adalah Maut	Won
2024	Indonesian Movie Actors Awards	Favorite Supporting Actress	Ipar adalah Maut	Won
2024	Festival Film Bandung	Outstanding Supporting Actress in a Motion Picture	Ipar adalah Maut	Nominated
2024	Festival Film Wartawan Indonesia	Best Supporting Actress – Drama Film Genre	Ipar adalah Maut	Won
