= Dewiq =

- Born: Cynthia Dewi Bayu Wardani; 15 June 1975 (age 51); Ujung Pandang, South Sulawesi, Indonesia
- Origin: Bandung, West Java
- Genres: Pop, pop rock, soul
- Occupations: Singer, songwriter
- Years active: c. 1996–present
- Labels: Sony Music Indonesia, Columbia Records

Cynthia Dewi Bayu Wardani (born 15 June 1975), better known by her stage name Dewiq, is an Indonesian singer and songwriter. Known for her "ear-catching and easy-to-listen-to" songs, she has been described as being one of Indonesia's most sought-after songwriters and composers.

== Biography ==
Dewiq was born Cynthia Dewi Bayu Wardani in Ujung Pandang, South Sulawesi (now Makassar) on 15 June 1975. She was the youngest of two children born to Indonesian Bambang Yulianto and Dutch woman Myrna Amy Nigell. She wrote her first song while in elementary school there, later learning to play the guitar and drums in junior and senior high school respectively.

After graduating high school, Dewiq joined Red Rose, a Bandung-based band that exclusively played songs by Extreme, Led Zeppelin, and Mr. Big. In 1996, she recorded her first album, Weeq. Weeq was well received, and was followed by two more albums, 1999's Apa Adanya (Just the Way I Am) and 2001's Hanya Manusia Biasa (Just Ordinary People). All three were released by Universal Music. Unable to deal with the hectic schedule of a singer, she made the shift to songwriting.

After her shift to songwriting, Dewiq wrote songs for numerous artists, including Malaysian singer Siti Nurhaliza as well as Indonesian singers Bunga Citra Lestari and Agnes Monica. As a way of expressing her gratitude to those who supported her, in 2008 Dewiq released a compilation album entitled Siapa Dewiq? The Hits Maker (Who's Dewiq? The Hits Maker); on the album, she contributed two duets, "Koq Gitu Sih?" ("Why does It Have to be That Way?") with TV host Indra Bekti and "Be Te" ("Bad Mood") with musician Ipang. The album went on to sell over 100,000 copies.

== Songwriting style ==
Dewiq notes that, she has been heavily influenced by The Beatles and Lenny Kravitz, as well as by her former husband Parlin Burman Siburan. She draws the inspiration for her lyrics from her personal experiences and those of her friends and family, which often result in sad songs. Once she has written the lyrics, the artist or record label that ordered the song is not allowed to change them; changing the music is acceptable. Music wise, she tends to ignore what is trending at the time.

Triwik Kurniasari of The Jakarta Post describes her songs as being "ear-catching and easy-to-listen-to"; she also describes Dewiq as perhaps being the most wanted songwriter and composer in Indonesia.

== Personal life ==
Dewiq married Parlin Burman Siburan, better known as Pay, a former member of Slank and current member of BIP, in March 2001. The couple secretly divorced in 2007, but only revealed it to the public in 2010 after Pay announced that he would be married to another woman. They continued to have a good relationship, collaborating on songs; Dewiq also attended Pay's second wedding. In 2009, she said that he had "taught [her] so much about everything, from music to life", citing him as the most influential person in her life.

== Discography ==
- Weeq (1996)
- Apa Adanya (Just the Way I Am; 1999)
- Hanya Manusia Biasa (Just Ordinary People; 2001)
- Siapa Dewiq? The Hits Maker (Who's Dewiq? The Hits Maker; 2008; compilation album)
