= Coke Bottle (song) =

2014 single by Agnez Mo

Single by Agnez Mo featuring Timbaland and T.I.
- Released: April 8, 2014
- Recorded: 2013
- Genre: R&B; hip-hop
- Length: 4:21
- Label: The Cherry Party; Sony
- Songwriters: Brandon Deener; Jocelyn Donald; James Washington; Rommel Cummings; Clifford Harris Jr.; David Foreman Jr.; Dashawn White; Agnes Muljoto
- Producers: Wizz Dumb; Timbaland; Jim Beanz; Davix Grinehouse

Agnez Mo singles chronology
"Walk" (2013)	"Coke Bottle" (2014)	"Boy Magnet" (2015)

Timbaland singles chronology
"Pass at Me" (2011)	"Coke Bottle" (2014)	"Walk It Out" (2014)

T.I. singles chronology
"I Can't Describe (The Way I Feel)" (2013)	"Coke Bottle" (2014)	"About the Money" (2014)

Music video
- "Coke Bottle ft. Timbaland & T.I." on YouTube

"Coke Bottle" is the first international single by Indonesian singer Agnez Mo featuring American producer Timbaland and American rapper T.I. It was written by her, James "Jim Beanz" Washington, Rommel Cummings, Clifford Harris, Jr., David "Davix Grinehouse" Foreman, Jr., and Dashawn "Happie" White, while Jim Beanz and Davix Grinehouse also served as the producers of the song along with Wizz Dumb and Timbaland.

== Production and release ==
"Coke Bottle" was written by Agnez Mo, Brandon Deener, Jocelyn Donald, James "Jim Beanz" Washington, Rommel Cummings, Clifford Harris, Jr., David "Davix Grinehouse" Foreman, Jr., and Dashawn "Happie" White, while Jim Beanz and Davix Grinehouse also served as the producers of the song along with Wizz Dumb and Timbaland.

== Reception ==
During the time Mo performed the single, she has drawn attention from media. Few critics have named her as "a new, fresh version of Aaliyah with a little taste of an 'emancipated' Ciara" and opined that she "creates a new image of an Asian entertainer". The song itself garnered positive review by music critics. It gained popular recognition due to its "ready, hot club-banger" sound. Described as "self-respect anthem" for every women and also referred as a women's empowerment anthem, although some described it as "overtly sexual". Eventually, it stayed in 20 consecutive weeks on Asia Pop 40, became the most searched song in social media and also became one of the most popular song on MTV. It managed to be MTV's Song of the Summer 2014, won over Iggy Azalea's Fancy featuring Charli XCX.

== Music video ==
Music video for "Coke Bottle" was released and premiered on 31 March 2014 on MTV and became the first video by an Asian female artist to be placed in "heavy rotation" by MTV. It has been available in her VEVO channel too. It garnered many attentions from overseas medias, as the video reached 1 million views in only one week. The music video was made in August 2013 in Miami, Los Angeles. Creative director of this music video produced by Laurieann Gibson with director Colin Tilley. The music video was funded fully by herself. The music video made her name became "the most searched". Later peaked at number one on MTV, the music video defeated Rita Ora and Miley Cyrus. In addition, the music video was also successfully penetrated some international music channels, such like Channel V, Trace Urban, RTP Internacional, Revolt TV and Channel AKA.

== Live performances ==
Agnez first performed the song at a private radio off-air show in Austin, TX on September 27, 2013. Afterwards, she performed the song at the ASEAN-Japan Music Festival that held in NHK Hall Tokyo, Japan on November 28, 2013 and also on Panasonic Gobel Awards on April 5, 2014. She also performed the song at the Jakarta International Java Jazz Festival (also known as JJF) on March 2, 2014.

== Track listing ==
Digital download

1. "Coke Bottle" – 4:21
2. "Coke Bottle" (Music Video) – 4:24

== Release history ==
Country	Date	Format	Label	Ref.
United States	8 April 2014	Digital download	The Cherry Party, Sony Music	
United States	20 April 2014	Urban contemporary radio	The Cherry Party, Sony Music	
