= Bintang Radio =

Indonesian singing competition

Bintang Radio Indonesia
- Other names: Bintang Radio; Bintang Radio dan Televisi; Bintang Radio Indonesia dan ASEAN
- Genre: Reality singing competition
- Country of origin: Indonesia
- Home station: RRI: RRI Programa 2 • RRI NET (since 2018); Formerly: RRI Programa 1 • TVRI (1974–1997?)
- Created by: Maladi
- Original release: 1951 – present
- No. of episodes: Varies
- Website: www.bintangradiorri.id

Bintang Radio Indonesia (lit. 'Indonesian Radio Star'), commonly also known as Bintang Radio (lit. 'Radio Star'), is an Indonesian singing competition and radio program aired by one of the country's public broadcaster Radio Republik Indonesia (RRI). Currently the show is broadcast on RRI Programa 2 and RRI's television channel RRI NET. It was first held in 1951, making it the oldest singing competition program in Indonesian broadcasting.

== History ==
The first edition of Bintang Radio was held in 1951, coinciding with RRI's sixth anniversary. In the early years, the Indonesian state recording company Lokananta recorded the winners' songs and distributed them to local RRI stations for airplay.

Initially, Bintang Radio focused on keroncong, but since 1955 the opera seria (seriosa) and "entertainment" (pop) songs began to be competed.

In 1974, RRI collaborated with its television counterpart TVRI to organized the event, thus the program name was changed to Bintang Radio dan Televisi (lit. 'Radio and Television Star'). This format appeared to end in 1997.

In the 2010s, the program was modified into Bintang Radio Indonesia and ASEAN (lit. 'Indonesia and ASEAN Radio Star'), where the winners had the opportunity to take part in a similar competition at the Southeast Asian level. However, the name was later reverted.

Starting in 2018, it was seen starting to air on RRI NET. This was the first on television since the 1990s.

A note from the RRI board of directors in February 2025 indicated that the 2025 edition of Bintang Radio was at the brink of being canceled, unless "all of its financing was supported by sponsors". This, which was also experienced by similar RRI-organized programs such as Quranic competition Pekan Tilawatil Quran 2025, was because of the Presidential Instruction Number 1 of 2025 signed by Indonesian president Prabowo Subianto, which had an impact on budget efficiency at the RRI. However, in July the network announced that the competition would be held that year.

== Format ==
As of 2025 there were changes to the format of the competition, such as:

1. Implementation of three-tiered selection system: Male and female participants who won at the RRI Regional Unit (Satuan Kerja or Satker) and Production Studio (Studio Produksi or SP) levels will compete in each of the 17 Regional Coordinators (Korwil) across the country.

2. Requirement to sing regional folk songs: Starting in the 2025 edition, Bintang Radio finalists are required to choose one of 17 selected regional folk songs from 17 different Regional Coordinators to be performed in the audition round until the Grand Final.

3. People's participation: The people as voters is given a quota of 30% of the total result to choose the contestant with the best performance, because RRI added a contestant results category based on the most votes in the voting application.

In addition to the new regulations, the host city of the national-level Bintang Radio Indonesia has undergone a change. The national-level competition, previously planned for Banjarmasin, has been moved to Jakarta, where the national-level round top 10 grand final was held on 4 to 6 November 2025 at the Abdurrahman Saleh Auditorium RRI Jakarta, while the result show will be held on 8 November 2025 at the Auditorium of the RRI World Service Building.
