= X (Agnez Mo album) =

Studio album by Agnez Mo
- Released: 10 October 2017
- Recorded: 2013–2017
- Genres: R&B; hip hop
- Length: 33:52
- Label: Entertainment Inc.
- Producers: Danja; Jim Beanz

Agnez Mo chronology
Agnez Mo (2013)	X (2017)

Singles from X
- 1. "Long As I Get Paid" Released: 20 September 2017; 2. "Damn I Love You" Released: 26 October 2017; 3. "Wanna Be Loved" Released: 22 October 2019

X is the ninth studio album by Indonesian pop singer Agnez Mo. This album served as Mo's second English language album and her first album to be promoted internationally. It was released on 10 October 2017 by her own label, Entertainment Inc. A pop and contemporary R&B album, it consists of 10 songs including the singles "Million $ Lover", "Long As I Get Paid", and "Sorry". Danja produced most of the album.

Mo has said that X is a confessional album that she considers to be "her most personal work to date." The album's title, X, is Roman numeral for "ten", which is Mo's lucky number. She has also said that the album is a journey and all of her experiences, and that her first apartment in LA was on Tenten Wilshire Boulevard. Despite being released internationally, this album failed to enter any international chart.

== Singles ==
Three singles were released from X. The lead single, "Long As I Get Paid", was released on 20 September 2017. Second single "Damn I Love You" was released on 26 October 2017. "Wanna Be Loved" was released as a final single on 22 October 2019.

== Music videos ==
The music video for "Long As I Get Paid", released 20 September 2017, features Agnes wearing a dress heavily influenced by Indonesian traditional-clothing aesthetics. The video reached 1.3 million views in 24 hours. On 26 October 2017, the music video for "Damn I Love You" was released. On 22 October 2019, the music video for "Wanna Be Loved" was released.

== Track listing ==
Digital Download Version
No.	Title	Writer(s)	Producer(s)	Length
1.	"Million $ Lover"	Agnes Monica Gabrielle Nowee; Jamaica "Kahncept" Smith; Marcella Araica; Nathaniel Hills	Danja	03.06
2.	"Long As I Get Paid"	Agnes Monica; Nowee; Smith; Araica; Hills	Danja	03.16
3.	"Sorry"	Agnes Monica; Nowee; Smith; Araica; Hills	Danja	03.34
4.	"Level Up!"	Agnes Monica; Nowee; Smith; Araica; Hills	Danja	02.59
5.	"Wanna Be Loved"	Agnes Monica; Nowee; Smith; Araica; Hills	Danja	03.04
6.	"Backroom"	Agnes Monica; Nowee; James David Washington; Dashawn "Happie" White; Araica; Hills	Wizz Dumb	02.48
7.	"Karma"	Agnes Monica; Nowee; Washington; Araica; Hills; Quentin Hills	Danja	03.51
8.	"Damn I Love You"	Agnes Monica; Nowee; Washington; Araica; Hills	Jim Beanz	03.51
9.	"Beautiful Mistake"	Agnes Monica; Nowee; Smith; Araica; Hills	Danja	03.33
10.	"Get What You Give"	Agnes Monica; Nowee; Washington; Araica; Hills	Danja	03.50
Total length:				33.00
