= Aquarius Musikindo =

Indonesian music company from Jakarta

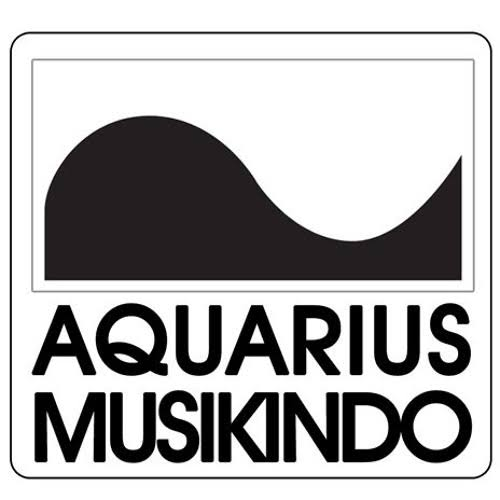
- Aquarius Musikindo logo
- Founded: 9 September 1969; 56 years ago
- Status: Active
- Genre: Various
- Country of origin: Indonesia
- Location: Gambir, Jakarta
- Official website: aquariusmusik.co.id

Aquarius Musikindo is an Indonesian music company from Jakarta, Indonesia. This company was founded on 9 September 1969 as Aquarius Music and in 1988 adopted the name Aquarius Musikindo. This company produces various music albums and songs. This company is the second largest recording company in Indonesia after Musica Studio's.

== Cooperation ==
In the 1970s, Aquarius collaborated with the Prambors radio network and formed Pramaqua. Several albums released by Pramaqua include the debut album by God Bless, the album Jurang Pemisah (Jockie Suryoprajogo and Chrisye) and Warkop DKI.

Apart from producing domestic music, Aquarius has also been the official producer and distributor for several albums produced by WEA, EMI, JVC, MCA, Capitol and PONYCANYON for the Indonesian region. Apart from that, Aquarius also became the official distributor for international albums produced by EMI and Sony until 2001 in line with the establishment of the record company network business in Indonesia which began in the 1990s. Cooperation with WEA ended in 1995 and EMI in 1997.

Currently Aquarius Musikindo is a distributor for several record companies in Indonesia which are members of the Aquarius Music Group, namely: Forte Records and POPS Musik.

== Cassette Store ==
Aquarius has also established Cassette Stores at several strategic points in several cities since 1995, such as Jl. Mahakam (Jakarta), Pondok Indah (Jakarta), Dago (Bandung) and Surabaya. The Aquarius cassette store network is also one of the largest in Indonesia besides DiscTarra. However, the rise of piracy has caused sales of physical albums to decline. One by one, Aquarius's cassette shops closed. The closure of their cassette shop was carried out at Aquarius Dago, Bandung in December 2009. On 25 August 2010, the Aquarius Pondok Indah cassette shop, which was the largest cassette shop in Indonesia, also closed. On 10 December 2013, the Aquarius Mahakam cassette shop, which was famous as the place where Jakarta's most historic albums were sold, also closed.

In the 1990s, the Aquarius music shop located in the Bulungan Blok M area in South Jakarta had 2 rooms. One of the largest rooms displays Western and Indonesian CDs and Indonesian children's pop. In the middle of the special Indonesian CD room, there is an arrangement of cassette players along with earbuds that can be used to test cassettes.

== Artist ==
=== Current ===
- Agnez Mo
- Ari Lasso
- D'Cinnamons
- J-Rocks
- Once Mekel
- Tipe-X
- Yana Julio

=== Former ===
- Ayushita (now on Ivy League Music)
- Bunga Citra Lestari (now at BASH Music Company)
- Dewa 19 (moved to Republik Cinta Records)
- Melly Goeslaw (moved to 100% Musik Indonesia)
- Project Pop (in the song because of Kahitna) (now on Halo Entertainment)
- Raffi Ahmad (now on MyMusic Records and RANS Music)
- Ruth Sahanaya (now at Ruth Sahanaya Productions)
- Titi DJ (now on e-Motion Entertainment)

== See also ==
- Lists of record labels

== Bibliography ==
- Aquarius Musikindo Gugat Bigo Terkait Hak Cipta Rp 100 Miliar
- Kemajuan Teknologi, Pembajakan Musik & Kebangkrutan Aquarius Musikindo
- Industri Musik Lesu, Ini Siasat Aquarius Musikindo
- Aquarius Sang Legenda
