= Asia's Got Talent season 3 =

Asia's Got Talent
- Season 3
- Hosted by: Alan Wong; Justin Bratton
- Judges: David Foster; Anggun; Jay Park
- Winner: Eric Chien
- Runner-up: Yaashwin Sarawanan

Release
- Original network: AXN Asia
- Original release: February 7 – April 11, 2019

Season chronology
- ← Previous; Season 2

The third season of Asia's Got Talent (AGT) premiered on February 7, 2019 at 8:30 pm (UTC+8). The winner of this season received a grand prize of US$100,000.

The show is hosted by Alan Wong and Justin Bratton, both returning from the previous season. David Foster, Anggun, and Jay Park returned as judges for this season.

The show's official sponsor for this season is Princess Cruises.

Taiwanese close-up magician, Eric Chien, was declared as the third season winner, making him the first winner from outside Southeast Asia as well as the first winner from a country with no separate Got Talent franchise.

== Auditions ==
=== Open auditions ===
The open auditions for the third season will take place in key cities in Asia. Open auditions will be held in Thailand, Singapore, Philippines, Vietnam, Indonesia, and Malaysia. The open auditions will be judged by Asia's Got Talent producers.

Auditionees are also allowed to submit their audition videos online via the show's official website. Entries will be accepted from May 16 to July 9, 2018. Due to popular demand, the online auditions were extended for another week until July 16, 2018. Those who will pass will proceed to the live judges' auditions.

Date of Open Audition	Open Audition Venue	City	Ref.
May 16 – July 16, 2018	Online Auditions		
June 17, 2018	Ultra Arena, Show DC	Bangkok, Thailand	
June 23, 2018	Blackbox Theatre, Goodman Arts Centre	Marine Parade, Singapore	
June 30, 2018	Quezon City Experience	Quezon City, Philippines	
July 1, 2018	Giai Phong Studio	Ho Chi Minh City, Vietnam	
July 7, 2018	Gor Bulungan	Jakarta, Indonesia	
July 8, 2018	Taylor's University Lakeside Campus	Subang Jaya, Malaysia	

=== Judges' auditions ===
Season 3 Judges

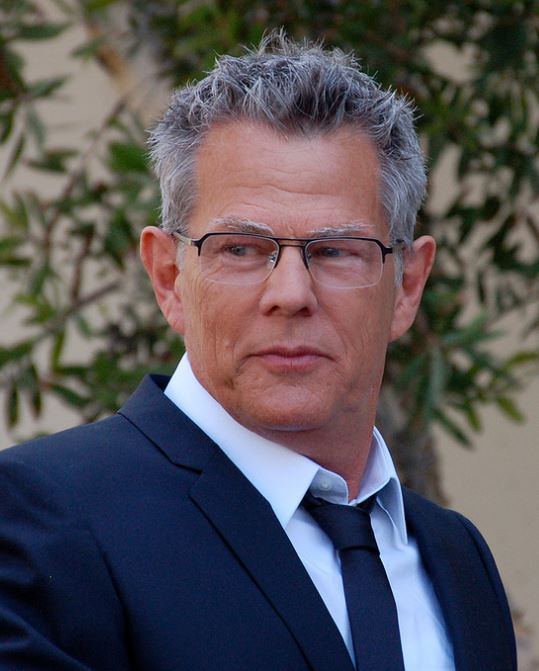
David Foster

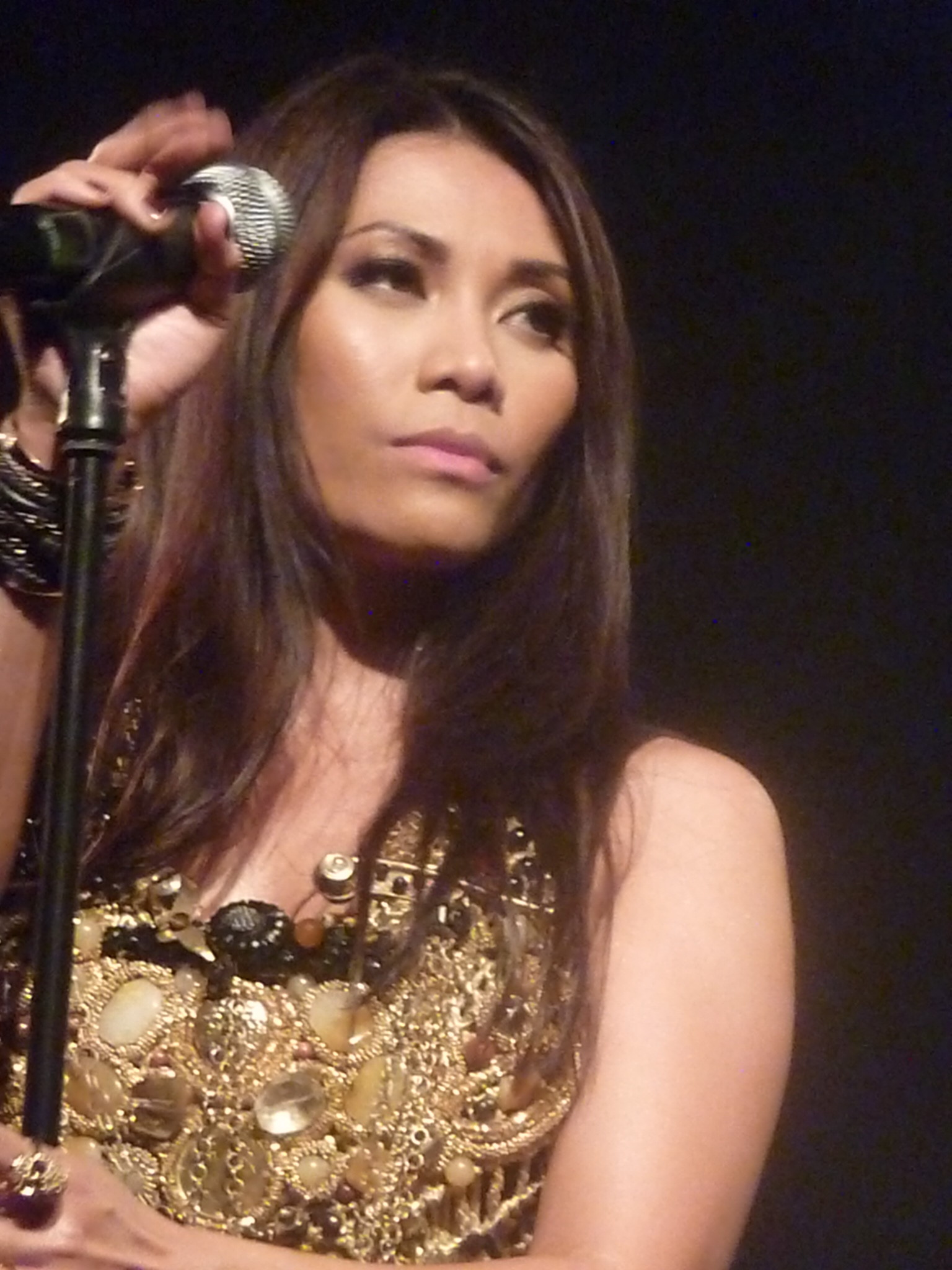
Anggun

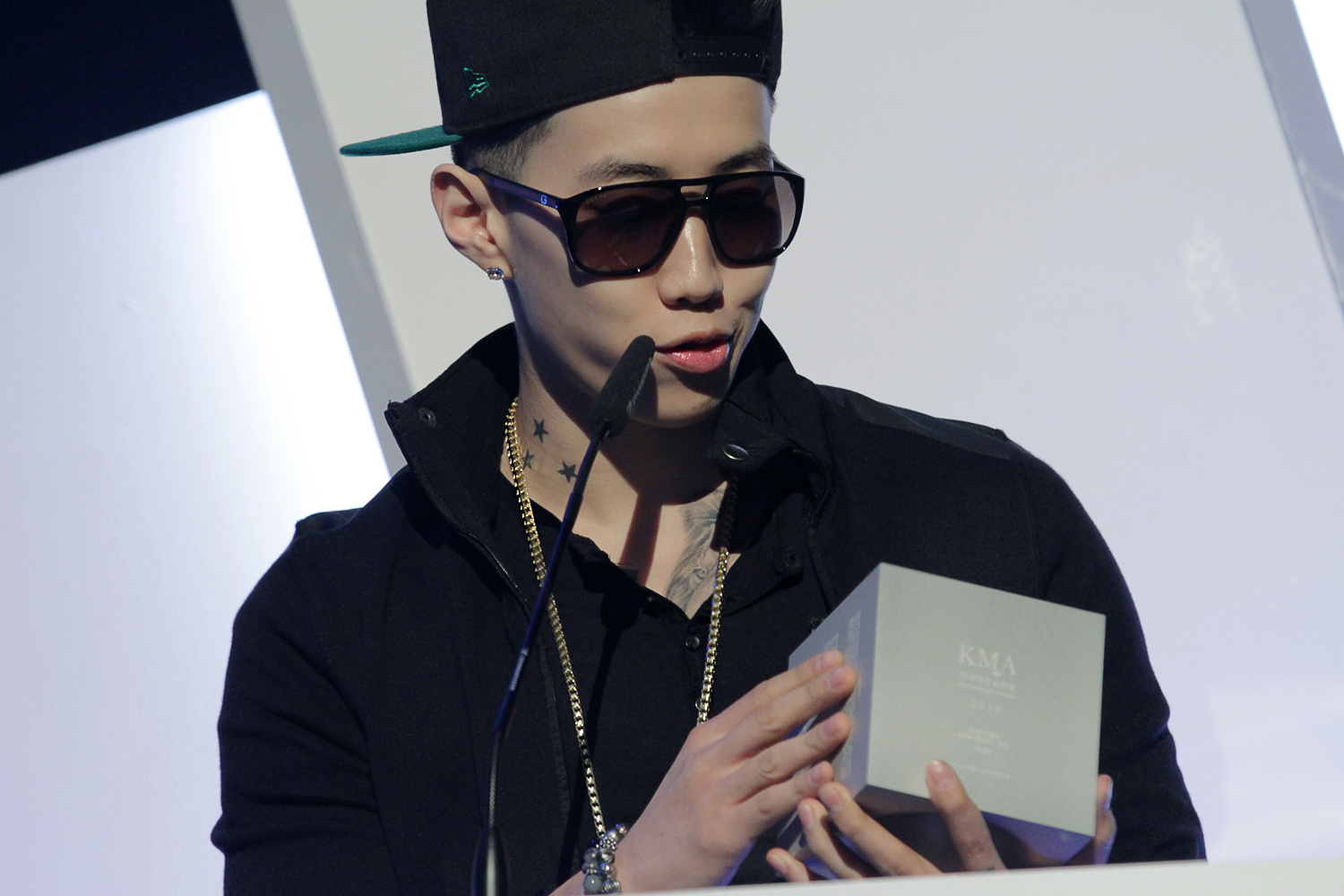
Jay Park

The judges' auditions were taped from September 19 to 27, 2018 at the Pinewood Iskandar Malaysia Studios in Johor, Malaysia like the previous seasons.

The judges' auditions once again feature the Golden Buzzer. Each judge would have one chance to use the Golden Buzzer. The hosts (as one) also get an opportunity to press the golden buzzer. The so-called Golden Acts, those on whom the Golden Buzzer is used, would automatically advance to the semifinals. Jay Park pressed his golden buzzer for the Singaporean digital magician, TK Jiang, on the first episode. Anggun pressed her golden buzzer for the Taiwanese hiphop dance group, Maniac Family, on the second episode. Alan & Justin pressed their golden buzzer for the hand shadow performer, Shadow Ace, from the Philippines, on the third episode. Lastly, David Foster gave his golden buzzer to Eleana Gabunada, a musical singer also from the Philippines, on the fourth episode.

Below are the acts who are confirmed within the show to have received at least two Yes votes and thus had successfully passed their auditions, as well as the Golden Acts. The list does not cover everyone who had passed. Due to time constraints, some acts, named or otherwise, are seen with their fates partially known (only one known Yes vote) or edited out completely from broadcast and are thus not listed.

Successful auditionees of Asia's Got Talent season 3
- YuiYui – robotic dancer
- Real X Tyle – hip-hop dance group
- Mark Polowat – acoustic-electric guitarist
- Yan Pei Ru – hula hoop dancer
- Ibnu Fikri – yo-yo player
- SVARN Crew – folk dance group
- Contortionist Aditya – contortionist
- Ronnie – singer
- TK Jiang – digital magician
- Ariane – soprano
- Anne-Sophie – singer
- HK Sisters – soprano & alto duet
- Frans Sisir – combophonist
- Ichikawa Koikuchi – comic performer
- Raisa Putri – singer
- Zeexhie – toddler cheerleader
- Once Upon A Time – children acrobatic duo
- Junior Good Vibes – hip-hop dance group
- Power Duo – contemporary acrobatic duo
- Expression Crew – b-boy dance group
- Freaky Girls – modern dance group
- Sudhir.R – flute player/beatboxer
- Meleena – singer
- J&K Voices – duet
- Oge Arthemus – escape artist
- Mr. Headbox – singer
- Park Go-eun – gayageum player
- Putra Purnaydha – traditional dance group
- Maniac Family – hip-hop dance group
- Kyle Macdonald – hip-hop dancer
- Putri Sridevi – traditional dancer
- Awesome Junior – hip-hop dance group
- Hoang Zoon – sword swallower
- Louis Sue – pole dancer
- David Feng – magician/mentalist
- Yubio – finger snapper
- Rock Opong – singer/guitarist
- DSDJ Kids – b-girl dance group
- Fabulous Sisters – contemporary dance group
- Shadow Ace – hand shadow performer
- LIFEDANCE Team – urban dance group
- Que Jianyu – Rubik's Cube juggler
- The Painters – dancing painters
- Boyon Boyon – yo-yo hacks
- Nama – quartet
- Dian Bokir – traditional contemporary dancer
- Yang Shih Hao – cyr wheel performer
- TanBA – dangerous magician
- Takumi Takahashi – close-up magician
- PP Anapat – singer/ukulele player
- Eleana Gabunada – musical singer
- Crescendo Acoustic – musical quartet
- Matt 'n Flo Drum Couple – drummer duo
- Hanoi XGirls – hip-hop dance group
- The 15 – dancing band
- Monica – singer
- Nok La Fiesta – singer/guitarist
- Ayalas – a capella beatboxers
- Yaashwin Sarawanan – human calculator
- Techno Circus – digital dance group
- Battmagic – digital magic group
- Ale Funky – electric guitarist
- Aman Alhamid – comedy magician
- Budshana Kalapuge – visual magician
- Eric Chien – close-up magician
- Siti Saniyah – singer
- United States of Bandung Percussion – percussion group
- Nuha – singer
- Kajii – improvised percussion duo
- Marlou M – hip-hop dancer
- JSwag – hip-hop dancer
- TeamLED – LED dance group
- Yogeshwari Mistry – acrobatic dancer
- Victoria Angela Paulus – singer
- BAD X TEN – comedy act
NOTE: Please be guided that the successful auditionees are listed according to their order of appearance. Golden acts are italicized. This list contains the aired auditions only.

== Semifinals ==
Like the previous season, the deliberation round was held at the Pinewood Iskandar Malaysia Studios in Johor, Malaysia. It was shown at end of the final auditions episode. Throughout the entire auditions, 99 acts received at least 2 yeses from the judges, including the four golden buzzer acts. Aside from the four acts that received the golden buzzer, the judges chose 20 more acts who would compete in semifinals. The four golden buzzer acts and the judges' picks would bring the total number of semifinalists to 24. The first eight semifinalists were announced after the deliberation round, with the others to be revealed gradually as the semifinal rounds progress.

The semifinal rounds were taped on December 6, 10, and 13, 2018 at the same studio as the judges' auditions.

Just like in the previous season, only online voting methods are available, but the Facebook hashtag voting was dropped. The audience may vote through Facebook Messenger and Google search. A maximum of 10 votes per day, per user, per platform is implemented.

Facebook Messenger

- The viewer must search for Asia's Got Talent on Facebook Messenger. A photo carousel will appear with the pictures of the week's semifinalists. Click the picture to assign 1 to 10 votes for the chosen act.

Google Search

- The user must have a Google account first. The phrase "Asia's Got Talent vote" must be typed on the search box. The photos of the week's acts will appear. Click the photo to choose the act. The slider on the right assigns 1 to 10 votes for that act.

The revelation of results is slightly different, being revealed in the following week rather than the next night (as semifinal rounds are only once weekly, barring replays). The Judges' Pick returns this season. The judges would come to a unanimous decision to send one act straight to the finals. This is similar to the Judges' Choice in the other local franchises, albeit one ahead of the vote rather than after and based on the vote. Aside from the Judges' Pick, the two acts with the most public votes would also advance to the finals. There would be a total of nine finalists emerging from the three semifinal rounds.

- Winner
- Runner-up
- Third place
- Fourth place
- Middle two
- Bottom three
- Golden Buzzer
- Judges' Pick

Name of act	Genre	Act	Hometown	Semifinal Week	Result
Eric Chien	Magic	Magician	Taiwan	2	Winner
Yaashwin Sarawanan	Variety	Human Calculator	Malaysia	2	Runner-up
Power Duo	Acrobatics	Acrobat Duo	Philippines	3	Third place
Maniac Family	Dance	Dance	Taiwan	1	Fourth place
Siti Saniyah	Singing	Singer	Indonesia	1	Middle two
Shadow Ace	Variety	Shadow Act	Philippines	1	Middle two
Yang Shih Hao	Acrobatics	Cyr Wheel Acrobat	Taiwan	3	Bottom three
Junior Good Vibes	Dance	Dance Group	Philippines	2	Bottom three
Nama	Singing	Singing Group	Malaysia	3	Bottom three
The Painters	Variety	Painting Dance Group	South Korea	2	Eliminated
Ale Funky	Music	Electric Guitarist	Indonesia	1	Eliminated
Awesome Junior	Dance	Dance Group	Thailand	2	Eliminated
Eleana Gabunada	Singing	Singer	Philippines	2	Eliminated
Fabulous Sisters	Dance	Dance Group	Japan	1	Eliminated
Frans Sisir	Music	Combophonist	Indonesia	3	Eliminated
Hanoi XGirls	Dance	Dance Group	Vietnam	3	Eliminated
HK Sisters	Singing	Opera Duo	Philippines	3	Eliminated
J&K Voices	Singing	Singing Duo	Indonesia	2	Eliminated
Once Upon a Time	Acrobatics	Acrobat Duo	Vietnam	1	Eliminated
Rock Opong	Singing	Singer	Philippines	1	Eliminated
Sudhir.R	Music	Flute Player	India	3	Eliminated
Takumi Takahashi	Magic	Magician	Japan	1	Eliminated
TK Jiang	Magic	Magician	Singapore	3	Eliminated
YuiYui	Dance	Dancer	Japan	2	Eliminated

=== Semifinals summary ===
- Buzzed out
- Judges' Pick
- Won judges' pick and advanced to the finals
- Won public vote and advanced to the finals

==== Semifinals 1 (March 14) ====
Voting for this round took place exclusively through Google Search due to technical problems experienced on Facebook services by users in numerous countries several hours before the episode aired.

Act	Order	Performance description	Buzzes			Result
Act	Order	Performance description	Foster	Anggun	Park	Result
Fabulous Sisters	1	Performed an interpretative dance amongst a clock tower machinery motif to the tune of a violin solo and dance version of Johann Sebastian Bach's "Toccata and Fugue in D minor."				Eliminated
Ale Funky	2	Performed an electric guitar/rock solo version of Mozart's "Rondo alla turca".				Eliminated
Shadow Ace	3	Performed a comedy shadow performance related to each of the three judges. Highlights included "Park" dancing to "Gangnam Style" by Psy (complete with horses), "Foster" trying his hand at break dancing despite his age, "Anggun" having water problems in the bathroom, and several lovers' spats.				Advanced
Siti Saniyah	4	Sang "Valerie" by The Zutons.				Advanced
Takumi Takahashi	5	Made Foster to pick a card which was stabbed with a butterfly knife. The identity of the stabbed card was revealed through magically turning the other cards of the same suit face up amongst a deck of face-down cards.				Eliminated
Once Upon a Time	6	Performed a series of dance routines, culminating in one while suspended by ropes, all while in clown get-up.				Eliminated
Rock Opong	7	Sang "I Believe" by Frankie Laine.				Eliminated
Maniac Family	8	Performed a tribal and fire-themed dance routine.				Advanced

==== Semifinals 2 (March 21) ====
Act	Order	Performance description	Buzzes			Result
Act	Order	Performance description	Foster	Anggun	Park	Result
Awesome Junior	1	Performed a biker gang dance routine to the tune of "Judas" by Lady Gaga and "Runaway Baby" by Bruno Mars.				Eliminated
Eric Chien	2	Performed a magical routine involving a box containing cards and a string separating two halves of a table. Cards were separated by colors of their backs and cards traversing sides changed back colors. Red cards were then made to vanish, while one blue-back card disintegrated in part while crossing the string. The cards turned into coins and transposing the last card and a coin also changed the others. After the coins were placed into the box, the box contents and string disappeared. During the performance, Eric's vest changed color from black to blue and red and then back to black.				Advanced
The Painters	3	Performed a dance/speed drawing performance where four famous paintings were recreated: The Kiss, Vincent van Gogh's September 1889 self-portrait, Napoleon Crossing the Alps, and Mona Lisa.				Eliminated
Eleana Gabunada	4	Sang "Defying Gravity" from the musical Wicked.				Eliminated
Yaashwin Sarawanan	5	Performed a series of mathematical equations: adding six two-digit numbers (three times), multiplied two two-digit numbers, added a two-digit number to itself 57 times, and divided a three-digit number by 7 while blindfolded.				Advanced
YuiYui	6	Performed a popping dance performance with an arcade game (a la Just Dance) theme.				Eliminated
J&K Voices	7	Sang "Can You Feel the Love Tonight" from the movie The Lion King.				Eliminated
Junior Good Vibes	8	Performed a street dance routine that included aerial stunts and well known dance moves such as the Shoot and the Floss.				Advanced

==== Semifinals 3 (March 28) ====
Act	Order	Performance description	Buzzes			Result
Act	Order	Performance description	Foster	Anggun	Park	Result
Hanoi XGirls	1	Performed a Catwoman-themed dance routine.				Eliminated
Frans Sisir	2	Performed a variety of jazz standards with his comb to the tunes of "Sway", "Moonlight Serenade" and "Quando quando quando".				Eliminated
Yang Shih Hao	3	Performed a dream/friendship-themed performance to the tune of a cover version of "Somewhere Only We Know," originally by Keane.				Advanced
HK Sisters	4	Performed a duet version of "Nella Fantasia" by Sarah Brightman.				Eliminated
TK Jiang	5	Performed several magic tricks using a giant tablet PC and with the assistance of his significant other Su Yee who was at a remote location: The magician drank several sips of juice from a glass, caught said juice from a different container into a wineglass, and helped clean the spill by remotely sending a handkerchief to her. The magician then took a selfie with the hosts using his iPad, produced a physical version of it, and made it disappear by using a black handkerchief; said physical photograph reappeared in a picture frame behind Su Yee.				Eliminated
Sudhir.R	6	Played his bansuri to the tunes of "Believer" by Imagine Dragons and "Despacito" by Luis Fonsi featuring Daddy Yankee and at the same time added accompanying beatbox tunes with "Jai Ho" by A. R. Rahman as the background music.				Eliminated
Power Duo	7	Performed a dance routine to the tune of "Say Something" by A Great Big World and Christina Aguilera.				Advanced
Nama	8	Sang "Sax" by Fleur East.				Advanced

== Finals ==
The finals, like the previous season, will be held at the Marina Bay Sands, Singapore, over a span of two episodes, a performance night and a results night.

The winner will receive a grand prize of US$100,000 and one-year complimentary flights from VietJet Air.

The opening production consists of the 9 finalists dancing to "Don't Stop Me Now" by Queen.

David Foster played the piano for Fernando Varela and Pia Toscano, who sang "You Raise Me Up" by Josh Groban and "All by Myself" by Eric Carmen, respectively. Anggun performed a duet with Luciano Pavarotti to "Caruso" in a virtual concert. While Jay Park performed his newest single entitled "K-Town".

- Winner
- Runner-up
- Third place
- Fourth place
- Middle two
- Bottom three
- Auditions Golden Buzzer
- Semifinals Judges' Pick

Act	Order	Performance description	Result
Maniac Family	1	Performed a dance routine simulating a virtual reality experience, starting with a world similar ancient China and then switching to a world in the distant future. Tied to this change in setting, the lead female dancer wore a Chinese empress-styled costume, then stripped to reveal a futuristic get-up underneath.	Fourth place
Siti Saniyah	2	Sang "Rather Be" by Clean Bandit featuring Jess Glynne.	Middle two
Shadow Ace	3	Performed a shadow play routine about a gay man's journey from heartbreak after a previous relationship into becoming a successful trans woman performer while facing prejudice and the like along the way. Songs used in the performance were "I Will Survive" by Gloria Gaynor, "Like a Virgin" by Madonna, "One Night Only" (disco version), and "And I Am Telling You I'm Not Going," the latter two from the musical Dreamgirls.	Middle two
Yaashwin Sarawanan	4	Started with an opener a la The Matrix, correctly guessed the days of the week of the Petronas Towers' opening and the Apollo 11 Moon landing (both Sunday), and released the hosts who were locked in a cage by correctly answering an addition equation, the cube root of 19,683 (27), and a gradually long calculation equation, all within a time limit of two and a half minutes.	Runner-up
Eric Chien	5	Performed two sets of close-up magic routine. The magician first magically switched a silver coin and a copper coin, with one coin firmly inside Park's hand. The magician then poured colored chocolate buttons into a bowl, from which he produced a small Rubik's Cube, which host Alan Wong scrambled, and a larger cube, also scrambled then solved instantaneously; the smaller Rubik's cube was also found solved under Wong's hand. Both cubes were then transformed back into chocolate buttons.	Winner
Junior Good Vibes	6	Performed a baseball-themed routine which also included a cheerleading portion to the tune of "Shake It Off" by Taylor Swift.	Bottom three
Yang Shih Hao	7	Performed a space and flowers routine to the tune of "Take On Me" by A-ha (both the original and a slow cover version). At the end of the performance, Shih Hao left the cyr wheel and suspended himself above the stage as the words "You see it when you believe it" appeared at the sides.	Bottom three
Power Duo	8	Performed an interpretative dance and acrobatics routine to the tune of "Come What May" from the film Moulin Rouge!	Third place
Nama	9	Sang "Freedom! '90" by George Michael.	Bottom three

== Contestants who appeared on previous shows or seasons ==
Name of Act	Television show	Season	Result	Notes
TK Jiang	Asia's Got Talent	2	Auditionee	His audition was part of the montage of rejected acts
Ariane	Asia's Got Talent	2	Semifinalist	Part of The Sisters
Anne-Sophie	Asia's Got Talent	2	Semifinalist	Part of The Sisters
Raisa Putri	Eat Bulaga! Indonesia		Eliminated in Top 9 Final Show	Little Miss Indonesia, an Indonesian adaptation of Little Miss Philippines, a talent contest segment for female kids
Raisa Putri	Indonesian Idol Junior		Eliminated in First Elimination Round	
Raisa Putri	The Voice Kids Indonesia	2	Eliminated in the Sing-offs	Two-chair turner and joined Team Tulus
J&K Voices	The Voice Kids Indonesia	2	Jordan: Eliminated in the Blind Auditions; Kezia: Eliminated in the Battle Rounds	Jordan: Non-chair turner Kezia: Two-chair turner and joined Team Tulus
Victoria Angela Paulus	The Voice Kids Indonesia	3	Eliminated in the Blind Auditions	Non-chair turner
Monica	Idola Cilik	5	Eliminated in Top 34 Menuju Pentas Round	
Monica	The Voice Kids Indonesia	1	Eliminated in the Battle Rounds	Three-chair turner and joined Team Agnez Mo
Zeexhie	Little Big Shots (Philippines)	1	–	
Zeexhie	Eat Bulaga!	–	Finalist	Hype Kang Bata Ka!, a talent contest segment for kids
Power Duo	Pilipinas Got Talent	5	Winner	Received a golden buzzer during the auditions
Shadow Ace	Pilipinas Got Talent	5	Semifinalist	Auditioned under his real name, Philip Galit; got 4 yeses during the auditions
Angelisa del Rosario (Angel's Team)	Pilipinas Got Talent	6	Auditionee	Got 4 yeses but not selected in the Judges' Cull
ZooDiva	Pilipinas Got Talent	6	Auditionee	Appeared in Season 6 of Pilipinas Got Talent.
Rock Opong	The Voice Kids (Philippines)	2	Eliminated in the Battles	Three-chair turner and joined Team Sarah
Rock Opong	Tawag ng Tanghalan Kids	1	Daily Winner	Participated in wildcard round but was eliminated
Rock Opong	Little Big Shots (Philippines)	1	–	
Meleena	I Can See Your Voice (Philippines)	1	Winner	Joined in November 5, 2017 as Mara Santos and she won a duet with KZ Tandingan
Oge Arthemus	The Master	5	Winner	
Fabulous Sisters	World of Dance	2	Divisional Finalist	Competed under the Junior Team category
Boyon Boyon	Various	–	N/A	Appeared in Waratte Iitomo! and Oha Suta among others
TanBA	Britain's Got Talent	11	Auditionee	Got 4 yeses but not selected in the Judges' Decisions
TanBA	Penn & Teller: Fool Us	5	Non-Fooler	
TanBA	The Grand Master Asia	–	Eliminated in the Top 4	
Nadzri	The Grand Master Asia	–	Eliminated in the Top 6	
Eleana Gabunada	The Voice Kids (Philippines)	3	Eliminated in the Battles	Three-chair turner and joined Team Lea
Eleana Gabunada	Tawag ng Tanghalan Kids	1	Daily Winner	Participated in wildcard round but was eliminated
PP Anapat	Little Big Shots ตัวเล็ก...โชว์ใหญ่	1	–	
Que Jianyu	Little Big Shots (Australia)	1	–	
Kazuhisa Uekusa	Nichieri	6	Semifinalist	As "Naked Comedian"; received the golden buzzer during auditions
Kazuhisa Uekusa	Britain's Got Talent	12	Semifinalist	As "Mr. Uekusa"
Kazuhisa Uekusa	America's Got Talent	13	Auditionee	As "Wes-P"; did not pass audition
Kazuhisa Uekusa	La France a un incroyable talent	13	Finalist	As "Uekusa"; received the golden buzzer during auditions
Siti Saniyah	The Voice Indonesia	2	Eliminated in the Knockouts	Four-chair turner and joined Team Agnez
Siti Saniyah	Rising Star Indonesia	2	Eliminated in the Final Duels	Lost with a percentage of 43%; got 3 nos and 1 yes from the experts
Techno Circus	America's Got Talent	10	Semi-finalist	As "Siro-A"; received the golden buzzer during the Judge Cuts
