= The Voice Kids Indonesia season 4 =

The Voice Kids Indonesia
- Season 4
- Hosted by: Ananda Omesh; Ersa Mayori; Okky Lukman
- Coaches: Marcell Siahaan; Yura Yunita & Rizky Febian; Isyana Sarasvati
- Winner: Nikita Mawarni
- Winning coach: Isyana Sarasvati
- Runner-up: Faith Christabelle

Release
- Original network: GTV
- Original release: February 4 – April 8, 2021

Season chronology
- ← Previous; Season 3

The fourth season of the Indonesian reality talent show The Voice Kids Indonesia premiered on February 4, on GTV with Marcell Siahaan returning for his second time as coach, while Yura Yunita & Rizky Febian and Isyana Sarasvati replacing Agnez Mo and Kaka Satriaji. This season initially will be aired at 2020, but delayed in 2021 because of COVID-19 pandemic.

== Audition ==
City	Location	Date	Time (local time)
Bandung, West Java	Fox Harris Hotel	February 2, 2020	09.00–18.00
Balikpapan, East Kalimantan	Hotel Neo+	February 2, 2020	09.00–18.00
Padang, West Sumatra	Whiz Prime Hotel	February 2, 2020	09.00–18.00
Kupang, East Nusa Tenggara	Sahid T-More Hotel	February 9, 2020	09.00–18.00
Surabaya, East Java	Batiqa Hotel Darmo	February 9, 2020	09.00–18.00
Denpasar, Bali	Neo Hotel	February 16, 2020	09.00–18.00
Medan, North Sumatra	Harper Wahid Hasyim Hotel	February 16, 2020	09.00–18.00
Makassar, South Sulawesi	Pesonna Hotel	February 16, 2020	09.00–18.00
Batam, Riau Islands	Zia Boutique Hotel	February 23, 2020	09.00–18.00
Yogyakarta, Special Region of Yogyakarta	Sahid Raya Hotel	February 23, 2020	09.00–18.00
Jakarta, Special Capital Region of Jakarta	MNC Studios Tower 2	February 29-March 1, 2020	09.00–18.00
Online Audition		March 2–15, 2020	—

== Coaches & Hosts ==
=== Coach ===
- Marcell Siahaan
- Yura Yunita & Rizky Febian
- Isyana Sarasvati

=== Host ===
- Ananda Omesh
- Ersa Mayori
- Okky Lukman (guest host)

== Teams ==
Color key:

- Winner
- Runner-up
- Third place
- Eliminated in the Finale
- Eliminated in the Semifinals
- Eliminated in the Live Shows
- Stolen in the Battle rounds
- Eliminated in the Battle rounds

Coaches	Top 63 artists					
Marcell Siahaan						
Marcell Siahaan	Kesya Alexhandra	Matthew Mashandro	Britney Kimberley	Farel Ibnu	Amanda Maren	Marcellino Putra
Marcell Siahaan	Putri Gita	Safeenah Fathira	~~Abdul Izati~~	Abbygayle Callista	Aisyah Fitri	Alanna Chrystalia
Marcell Siahaan	Esther Freya	Herman Siregar	Keke Amanda	Margareth Monalisa	Maulidina Ulfi	Mutiara Hatiku
Marcell Siahaan	Nakeisha Anjali	Nakiza Zuhra	Yura Shibata	Zhelda Safitri		
Yunita Rahman & Rizky Febian						
Yunita Rahman & Rizky Febian	Faith Christabelle	Jennefer Siregar	Ghatfaan Rifqi	Joanna Grania	Cheryl Xaviera	Fakhrizal Husaini
Yunita Rahman & Rizky Febian	Gebby Saragih	Regita Pramesti	~~Putri Gita~~	Celine Gabrielle	Chelsea Jove	Dalton Simanjuntak
Yunita Rahman & Rizky Febian	Helena Cinta	Kiera Winata	Larissa Biel	Mia Zaskiyya	Mesya Gobel	Michaela Sopacua
Yunita Rahman & Rizky Febian	Michaella Kalea	Naufal Fawwaz	Olivia Christie	Prisellia Kiansty		
Isyana Sarasvati						
Isyana Sarasvati	Nikita Mawarni	Diajeng Sekartaji	Mirai Naziel	Shaina Putri	Abdul Izati	Alisha Nadira
Isyana Sarasvati	Chevira & Dhevira	Najla Rahel	~~Ghatfaan Rifqi~~	Adelways Lay	Adzra Zulfa	Aisha Candrika
Isyana Sarasvati	Alycia Zarabelle	Anabelle Wiana	Fransisca Sherlyta	Hijrah Andari	Johanes Zibran	Nafisa Geno
Isyana Sarasvati	Nafisah Alayyah	Nataya Angeleuis	Shyla Luvina	Tesalonika Imanuel		
Note: Italicized names are stolen artists (names struck through within former teams).

== Blind Auditions ==
A new feature within the Blind Auditions this season is the Block, which each coach can use twice to prevent one of the other coaches from getting a contestant.

Color key:

✓	Coach pressed "I WANT YOU" button
	Artist defaulted to this coach's team
	Artist elected to join this coach's team
	Artist eliminated with no coach pressing his or her "I WANT YOU" button
✗	Coach pressed the "I WANT YOU" button, but was blocked by Marcell from getting the artist
✗	Coach pressed the "I WANT YOU" button, but was blocked by Yura & Rizky from getting the artist
✗	Coach pressed the "I WANT YOU" button, but was blocked by Isyana from getting the artist

=== Episode 1 (February 4) ===
First blind auditions results
Order	Artist	Age	Hometown	Song	Coaches and Artists Choices		
Order	Artist	Age	Hometown	Song	Marcell	Yura & Rizky	Isyana
1	Fakhrizal Husaini	12	Medan	"Tum Hi Ho" (from Aashiqui 2)	–	✔	–
2	Alisha Nadira	15	Jakarta	"Amin Paling Serius"	✔	✔	✔
3	Petran Misael	13	Ruteng	"Karena Su Sayang"	–	–	–
4	Cheryl Xaviera	10	Salatiga	"7 Rings"	✔	✔	✔
5	Diajeng Sekartaji	13	Lumajang	"Untuk Hati Yang Terluka" (from Nanti Kita Cerita Tentang Hari Ini)	✔	✔	✔
6	Michelle Tanuwijaya	14	Bekasi	"Nonton Bioskop"	–	–	–
7	Larissa Biel	12	Tangerang	"Hoolala"	–	✔	–
8	Marcellino Putra	14	Solo	"Banyu Langit"	✔	–	✔
9	Hadijah Shahab	12	Jakarta	"Everything At Once"	–	–	–
10	Sheera Katya	10	Denpasar	"This Love"	–	–	–

=== Episode 2 (February 5) ===
Second blind auditions results
Order	Artist	Age	Hometown	Song	Coaches and Artists Choices		
Order	Artist	Age	Hometown	Song	Marcell	Yura & Rizky	Isyana
1	Chevira & Dhevira	12 & 12	Bali	"Into the Unknown"	✔	–	✔
2	Mia Zaskiyya	14	Yogyakarta	"Aisyah Istri Rasulullah"	–	✔	–
3	Maulidina Ulfi	15	Padang	"Bukan Cinta Biasa"	✔	–	✔
4	Giovano Widayanto	7	Banyuwangi	"Menunggu Kamu"	–	–	–
5	Britney Kimberly	14	Garut	"Lathi"	✔	✔	✓ ^{1}
6	Nafisa Geno	13	Surabaya	"Dance Monkey"	–	–	✔
7	Jaena Amelia	12	Tangerang	"Bertaut"	–	–	–
8	Matthew Mashandro	12	Semarang	"Ekspektasi"	✔	✓	✓
9	Violeta Ratu	13	Surabaya	"I Love You 3000"	–	–	–
10	Prisellia Kiansty	14	Ambon	"It's A Man's Man's Man's World"	–	✔	–
11	Nakisha Thalita	12	Bandung	"I See The Light"	–	–	–
12	Putri Safa	14	Jakarta	"Lose"	–	–	–

- ^1 Yura & Rizky tried to block Isyana, but Isyana pressed her button first, so the block did not count.

=== Episode 3 (February 11) ===
Third blind auditions results
Order	Artist	Age	Hometown	Song	Coaches and Artists Choices		
Order	Artist	Age	Hometown	Song	Marcell	Yura & Rizky	Isyana
1	Abbygayle Callista	14	Jakarta	"Selow"	✔	–	✓
2	Fransisca Sherlyta	13	Salatiga	"Sikap Duniawi"	–	–	✔
3	Vasilysa Stefanovna	12	Malang	"Mungkin Hari Ini Esok atau Nanti"	–	–	–
4	Regita Pramesti	11	Surabaya	"Anoman Obong"	✔	✔	✘
5	Yura Shibata	15	Bali	"First Love"	✔	–	–
6	Ghatfaan Rifqi	13	Semarang	"Pamer Bojo"	✔	✔	✔
7	Arrul Erwandy	15	Batam	"Seperti Mati Lampu"	–	–	–
8	Mirai Naziel	13	Solo	"Someone You Loved"	–	✘	✔
9	Athafariq Agani	11	Padang	"Seandainya Aku Punya Sayap"	–	–	–
10	Kiera Winata	14	Denpasar	"Bohemian Rhapsody"	–	✔	–^{2}
11	Fauziah Nazwari	15	Cianjur	"Biarlah Merana"	–	–	–

- ^2 Yura & Rizky blocked Isyana, but Isyana did not press her button, so the block did not count.

=== Episode 4 (February 12) ===
Fourth blind auditions results
Order	Artist	Age	Hometown	Song	Coaches and Artists Choices		
Order	Artist	Age	Hometown	Song	Marcell	Yura & Rizky	Isyana
1	Faith Christabelle	15	Tangerang	"Before You Go"	✔	✔	✔
2	Nakeisha Anjali	10	Balikpapan	"Believer"	✔	✔	–
3	Salwa Daniah	11	Bandung	"Gang Kelinci"	–	–	–
4	Nikita Mawarni	13	Medan	"New York, New York"	✓	✓	✔
5	Safeenah Fathira	15	Padang	"Pura Pura Lupa"	✔	–	✘
6	Carissa Halena	15	Surabaya	"Lowkey"	–	–	–
7	Olivia Christie	15	Jakarta	"Kamu & Kenangan" (from Habibie & Ainun 3)	✘	✔	✔
8	Mawaddatun Nadiyah	14	Bukittinggi	"I'd Rather Go Blind"	–	–	–
9	Hijrah Andari	12	Makassar	"Kejora"	–	–	✔
10	Grace Joy	13	Medan	"Tian Liang Le"	–	–	–
11	Keke Amanda	13	Bogor	"Butet"	✔	–	–

=== Episode 5 (February 18) ===
Fifth blind auditions results
Order	Artist	Age	Hometown	Song	Coaches and Artists Choices		
Order	Artist	Age	Hometown	Song	Marcell	Yura & Rizky	Isyana
1	Celine Gabrielle	12	Surabaya	"Psycho"	✓	✔	✓
2	Michaella Kalea	12	Semarang	"Don't Know Why"	✓	✔	–
3	Jurice Benu	15	Kupang	"Monolog"	–	–	–
4	Joanna Grania	15	Palangkaraya	"Harus Bahagia"	✓	✔	✓
5	Nafisah Alayyah	12	Medan	"I Like You So Much, You'll Know It"	–	–	✔
6	Marizah Ardani	15	Medan	"Melukis Senja"	–	–	–
7	Farel Ibnu	14	Bukittinggi	"Ummi Tsumma Ummi"	✔	✘	✓
8	Putri Rahayu	13	Bandung	"What's Up?"	–	–	–
9	Esther Freya	15	Semarang	"Rumpang"	✔	–	–
10	Bianca Sava	12	Medan	"Fana Merah Jambu"	–	–	–
11	Tesalonika Imanuel	15	Jakarta	"All in My Head"	–	–	✔

=== Episode 6 (February 19) ===
Sixth blind auditions results
Order	Artist	Age	Hometown	Song	Coaches and Artists Choices		
Order	Artist	Age	Hometown	Song	Marcell	Yura & Rizky	Isyana
1	Chelsea Jove	14	Batam	"You Give Love A Bad Name"	✓	✔	✓
2	Herman Siregar	13	Medan	"Sekali Ini Saja"	✔	✓	–
3	Grace Hotmian	14	Jakarta	"Kali Kedua"	–	–	–
4	Amanda Maren	14	Semarang	"Menahan Rasa Sakit"	✔	–	✓
5	Shyla Luvina	12	Semarang	"Kepada Perang"	–	–	✔
6	Putri Gita	15	Lampung	"Cuek"	✓	✔	✓
7	Zefanya Situmorang	10	Tangerang	"Lihat Lebih Dekat"	–	–	–
8	Alycia Zarabelle	11	Batam	"Jangan Marah"	–	–	✔
9	Yusuf Sumarno	15	Palembang	"Ayah"	–	–	–
10	Aisha Candrika	10	Yogyakarta	"I Feel Good"	–	✘	✔

=== Episode 7 (February 25) ===
Seventh blind auditions results
Order	Artist	Age	Hometown	Song	Coaches and Artists Choices		
Order	Artist	Age	Hometown	Song	Marcell	Yura & Rizky	Isyana
1	Anabelle Wiana	13	Jakarta	"Show Me How You Burlesque"	✔	✔	✔
2	Michaela Sopacua	13	Makassar	"Somebody to Love"	–	✔	–
3	Abigail Gabriella	13	Medan	"Andaikan Kau Datang"	–	–	–
4	Naufal Fawwaz	15	Bekasi	"Creep"	–	✔	–
5	Riyanti Damanik	12	Batam	"Cobalah Mengerti"	–	–	–
6	Gebby Saragih	14	Medan	"Seperti Yang Kau Minta"	✔	✔	✔
7	Abdul Izati	14	Bau Bau	"Disaat Menanti Disini Menunggu"	✔	–	–
8	Diva Aletta	13	Medan	"Bahasa Kalbu"	–	–	–
9	Najla Rahel	13	Bukittinggi	"Seberkas Sinar"	–	–	✔
10	Benn Yapari	12	Tangerang	"Pride & Joy"	–	–	–
11	Zhelda Safitri	14	Denpasar	"Bad Liar"	✔	–	–

=== Episode 8 (February 26) ===
Eighth blind auditions results
Order	Artist	Age	Hometown	Song	Coaches and Artists Choices		
Order	Artist	Age	Hometown	Song	Marcell	Yura & Rizky	Isyana
1	Shaina Putri	13	Semarang	"Rise Up"	✔	✔	✔
2	Nakisa Zuhra	11	Jakarta	"I Want You Back"	✔	–	–
3	Mutiara Hatiku	13	Bekasi	"Terlanjur Mencinta"	✔	–	–
4	Adnovta Davarel	13	Bekasi	"Deritaku"	–	–	–
5	Helena Cinta	11	Yogyakarta	"Almost There"	✓	✔	✓
6	Adelways Lay	9	Jakarta	"The Magic Flute"	✓	✓	✔
7	Aisyah Fitri	13	Jakarta	"Tolong"	✔	–	✓
8	Alanna Chrystalia	15	Jakarta	"Firasat"	✔	–	–
9	Dalton Simanjuntak	14	Medan	"Pelukku Untuk Pelikmu"	–	✔	–

=== Episode 9 (March 4) ===
Ninth blind auditions results
Order	Artist	Age	Hometown	Song	Coaches and Artists Choices		
Order	Artist	Age	Hometown	Song	Marcell	Yura & Rizky	Isyana
1	Mesya Gobel	10	Jakarta	"Mamma Knows Best"	✓	✔	✓
2	Johanes Zibran	15	Bogor	"Aku Milikmu Malam Ini"	✔	✓	✔
3	Adzra Zulfa	14	Magelang	"Kartonyono"	✓	–	✔
4	Kesya Alexhandra	14	Medan	"And I'm Telling You"	✔	✓	✓
5	Karel Moury	14	Medan	"Sahabat Kecil"	–	–	–
6	Jennefer Siregar	13	Batam	"idontwannabeyouanymore"	–	✔	✓
7	Theodora Christiana	14	Depok	"Intuisi"	–	Team full	–
8	Nataya Angeleuis	13	Salatiga	"I'll Never Love Again"	–	Team full	✔
9	Alleluia Christ	14	Makassar	"Leaving on a Jet Plane"	–	Team full	Team full
10	Margareth Monalisa	15	Kupang	"Kasih Slow"	✔	Team full	Team full
11	Patricia Kristania	14	Balikpapan	"Gemintang Hatiku"	Team full	Team full	Team full

== Battles ==
The battles began on March 11. The advisors for this season were Wizzy for Team Marcell, Ardhito Pramono for Team Yura & Rizky, and Nino Kayam for Team Isyana.

The power to steal an artist from other teams is implemented during this season. Each coach can steal one losing artist from another team. Artists who won their battle or are stolen by another coach advance to the Live Shows.

Color key:

Artist won the Battle and advanced to the Live Shows
Artist lost the Battle but was stolen by another coach and advanced to the Live Shows
Artist lost the Battle and was eliminated

Battles results
Episode	Coach	Order	Winner	Song	Losers		'Steal' results		
Episode	Coach	Order	Winner	Song	Losers		Marcell	Yura & Rizky	Isyana
Episode 10 (Thursday, March 11, 2021)	Yura & Rizky	1	Cheryl Xaviera	"Dynamite"	Celine Gabrielle	Michaella Kalea	–	—	–
Episode 10 (Thursday, March 11, 2021)	Marcell Siahaan	2	Britney Kimberley	"Tanpa Batas Waktu"	Abbygayle Callista	Zhelda Safitri	—	–	–
Episode 10 (Thursday, March 11, 2021)	Isyana Sarasvati	3	Najla Rahel	"All I Want"	Ghatfaan Rifqi	Nafisah Alayyah	–	✓	—
Episode 10 (Thursday, March 11, 2021)	Isyana Sarasvati	4	Alisha Nadira	"Risalah Hati"	Shyla Luvina	Tesalonika Imanuel	–	Team full	—
Episode 10 (Thursday, March 11, 2021)	Marcell Siahaan	5	Kesya Alexhandra	"Jangan Sampai Pasrah"	Mutiara Hatiku	Yura Shibata	—	Team full	–
Episode 10 (Thursday, March 11, 2021)	Yura & Rizky	6	Gebby Saragih	"Cinta Sejati"	Larissa Biel	Michaela Sopacua	–	Team full	–
Episode 10 (Thursday, March 11, 2021)	Marcell Siahaan	7	Amanda Maren	"Dulu Kita Masih SMA"	Esther Freya	Margareth Monalisa	—	Team full	–
Episode 10 (Thursday, March 11, 2021)	Isyana Sarasvati	8	Diajeng Sekartaji	"Pendekar Cahaya"	Fransisca Sherlyta	Hijrah Andari	–	Team full	—
Episode 10 (Thursday, March 11, 2021)	Yura & Rizky	9	Faith Christabelle	"Best Part"	Kiera Winata	Helena Cinta	–	Team full	–
Episode 10 (Thursday, March 11, 2021)	Marcell Siahaan	10	Safeenah Fathira	"Menemaniku"	Aisyah Fitri	Nakiza Zuhra	—	Team full	–
Episode 11 (Friday, March 12, 2021)	Isyana Sarasvati	1	Mirai Naziel	"Always Remember Us This Way"	Adzra Zulfa	Nataya Angeleuis	–	Team full	—
Episode 11 (Friday, March 12, 2021)	Yura & Rizky	2	Regita Pramesti	"Bahasa Kalbu"	Mia Zaskiyya	Prisellia Kiansty	–	Team full	–
Episode 11 (Friday, March 12, 2021)	Marcell Siahaan	3	Farel Ibnu	"Asal Kau Bahagia"	Abdul Izati	Maulidina Ulfi	—	Team full	✓
Episode 11 (Friday, March 12, 2021)	Marcell Siahaan	4	Marcellino Putra	"Teman Bahagia"	Alanna Chrystalia	Herman Siregar	—	Team full	Team full
Episode 11 (Friday, March 12, 2021)	Yura & Rizky	5	Joanna Grania	"Intuisi"	Olivia Christie	Putri Gita	✓	Team full	Team full
Episode 11 (Friday, March 12, 2021)	Isyana Sarasvati	6	Nikita Mawarni	"Sunday Morning"	Anabelle Wiana	Johanes Zibran	Team full	Team full	Team full
Episode 11 (Friday, March 12, 2021)	Yura & Rizky	7	Jennefer Siregar	"Fallin'"	Chelsea Jove	Mesya Gobel	Team full	Team full	Team full
Episode 11 (Friday, March 12, 2021)	Isyana Sarasvati	8	Shaina Putri	"Janji Untuk Mimpi"	Alycia Zarabelle	Nafisa Geno	Team full	Team full	Team full
Episode 11 (Friday, March 12, 2021)	Marcell Siahaan	9	Matthew Mashandro	"Kenangan Manis"	Keke Amanda	Nakeisha Anjali	Team full	Team full	Team full
Episode 11 (Friday, March 12, 2021)	Isyana Sarasvati	10	Chevira & Dhevira	"A Whole New World"	Adelways Lay	Aisha Candrika	Team full	Team full	Team full
Episode 11 (Friday, March 12, 2021)	Yura & Rizky	11	Fakhrizal Husaini	"Menari"	Dalton Simanjuntak	Naufal Fawwaz	Team full	Team full	Team full

== Live Shows ==
The live shows consists of four weeks. Starting with the Top 24 and ending with the Finale. This season, the voting system has changed. Unlike the previous three seasons, People can vote their favorite artists via RCTI+ app, instead of SMS.

During first Live Shows until Finale, Ananda Omesh was replaced by Okky Lukman because Omesh has tested positive to COVID-19 based on his Instagram story and an episode of Podkesmas podcast on Spotify which consists of himself.

Color key:

Artist was saved by the Public's votes
Artist was saved by his/her coach
Artist was eliminated

=== Week 1: Top 24, Group 1 (March 18) ===
The 12 artists performed for the votes of the public. The artist with the highest number of votes on each team directly advanced to the Semifinals. Then, each coach completing their respective teams with their own choice.

Episode	Coach	Order	Artist	Song	Result
Episode 12 (Thursday, March 18, 2021)	Yura & Rizky	1	Ghatfaan Rifqi	"Kamulah Satu-Satunya"	Public's vote
Episode 12 (Thursday, March 18, 2021)	Isyana Sarasvati	2	Chevira & Dhevira	"Anganku Anganmu"	Eliminated
Episode 12 (Thursday, March 18, 2021)	Marcell Siahaan	3	Putri Gita	"Reflection"	Eliminated
Episode 12 (Thursday, March 18, 2021)	Isyana Sarasvati	4	Mirai Naziel	"Rayu"	Public's vote
Episode 12 (Thursday, March 18, 2021)	Marcell Siahaan	5	Kesya Alexhandra	"Runnin' (Lose It All)"	Marcell's choice
Episode 12 (Thursday, March 18, 2021)	Isyana Sarasvati	6	Diajeng Sekartaji	"Karena Ku Sanggup"	Isyana's choice
Episode 12 (Thursday, March 18, 2021)	Yura & Rizky	7	Gebby Saragih	"Andai Aku Bisa"	Eliminated
Episode 12 (Thursday, March 18, 2021)	Marcell Siahaan	8	Matthew Mashandro	"Takkan Terganti"	Public's vote
Episode 12 (Thursday, March 18, 2021)	Yura & Rizky	9	Jennefer Siregar	"Titanium"	Yura & Rizky's choice
Episode 12 (Thursday, March 18, 2021)	Yura & Rizky	10	Regita Pramesti	"Hati Yang Kau Sakiti"	Eliminated
Episode 12 (Thursday, March 18, 2021)	Marcell Siahaan	11	Amanda Maren	"Berharap Tak Berpisah"	Eliminated
Episode 12 (Thursday, March 18, 2021)	Isyana Sarasvati	12	Alisha Nadira	"Kekasih Bayangan"	Eliminated

Non-competition performances
Order	Performer	Song
12.1	Marcell Siahaan and his team (Amanda Maren, Kesya Alexhandra, Matthew Mashiandro, and Putri Gita)	"Terima Kasih Bijaksana"
12.2	Yura & Rizky and their team (Gebby Saragih, Ghatfaan Rifqi, Jennefer Siregar, and Regita Pramesti)	"Sahabat Sejati"
12.3	Isyana Sarasvati and her team (Alisha Nadira, Chevira & Devhira, Diajeng Sekartaji, and Mirai Naziel)	"Melompat Lebih Tinggi"
12.4	Via Vallen, Marcell Siahaan, Yura & Rizky, and Isyana Sarasvati	"Pamer Bojo"
12.5	Via Vallen	"Roar"

=== Week 2: Top 24, Group 2 (March 25) ===
The 12 artists performed for the votes of the public. The artist with the highest number of votes on each team directly advanced to the Semifinals. Then, each coach completing their respective teams with their own choice.

Episode	Coach	Order	Artist	Song	Result
Episode 13 (Thursday, March 25, 2021)	Yura & Rizky	1	Cheryl Xaviera	"Muda (Le O Le O)"	Eliminated
Episode 13 (Thursday, March 25, 2021)	Marcell Siahaan	2	Farel Ibnu	"Tak Mungkin Bersama"	Public's vote
Episode 13 (Thursday, March 25, 2021)	Yura & Rizky	3	Fakhrizal Husaini	"O Re Piya"	Eliminated
Episode 13 (Thursday, March 25, 2021)	Isyana Sarasvati	4	Nikita Mawarni	"Burung Camar"	Public's vote
Episode 13 (Thursday, March 25, 2021)	Marcell Siahaan	5	Britney Kimberley	"New Rules"	Marcell's choice
Episode 13 (Thursday, March 25, 2021)	Isyana Sarasvati	6	Abdul Izati	"Kulepas Dengan Ikhlas"	Eliminated
Episode 13 (Thursday, March 25, 2021)	Yura & Rizky	7	Faith Christabelle	"Leave the Door Open"	Public's vote
Episode 13 (Thursday, March 25, 2021)	Isyana Sarasvati	8	Shaina Putri	"Dancing Queen/Mercy"	Isyana's choice
Episode 13 (Thursday, March 25, 2021)	Marcell Siahaan	9	Marcellino Putra	"Cidro"	Eliminated
Episode 13 (Thursday, March 25, 2021)	Isyana Sarasvati	10	Najla Rahel	"Gemintang Hatiku"	Eliminated
Episode 13 (Thursday, March 25, 2021)	Marcell Siahaan	11	Safeenah Fathira	"drivers license"	Eliminated
Episode 13 (Thursday, March 25, 2021)	Yura & Rizky	12	Joanna Grania	"Bentuk Cinta"	Yura & Rizky's choice

Non-competition performances
Order	Performer	Song
13.1	Isyana Sarasvati and her team (Abdul Izati, Najla Rahel, Nikita Mawarni, and Shaina Putri)	"Dynamite"
13.2	Yura & Rizky and their team (Cheryl Xaviera, Faith Christabelle, Fakhrizal Husaini, and Joanna Grania)	"Harus Bahagia"
13.3	Marcell Siahaan and his team (Britney Kimberley, Farel Ibnu, Marcellino Putra, and Safeenah Fathira)	"Inikah Cinta"
13.4	Denny Caknan	"Los Dol"
13.5	Denny Caknan and Marcellino Putra	"Kartonyono Medot Janji"

=== Week 3: Semifinals, Top 12 (April 1) ===
The Semifinals opened by The Sacred Riana.

The 12 artists performed for the votes of the public. The artist with the highest number of votes on each team directly advanced to the Finale. Then, each coach completing their respective teams with their own choice.

Episode	Coach	Order	Artist	Song	Result
Episode 14 (Thursday, April 1, 2021)	Isyana Sarasvati	1	Mirai Naziel	"Tetap Dalam Jiwa" (Note: Mirai Naziel sang "Tetap Dalam Jiwa" with the music Remixed by DJ Una.)	Eliminated
Episode 14 (Thursday, April 1, 2021)	Marcell Siahaan	2	Britney Kimberley	"Hanya Memuji"	Eliminated
Episode 14 (Thursday, April 1, 2021)	Yura & Rizky	3	Faith Christabelle	"Weak"	Public's vote
Episode 14 (Thursday, April 1, 2021)	Isyana Sarasvati	4	Nikita Mawarni	"Sinaran"	Public's vote
Episode 14 (Thursday, April 1, 2021)	Marcell Siahaan	5	Farel Ibnu	"Hanya Rindu"	Eliminated
Episode 14 (Thursday, April 1, 2021)	Yura & Rizky	6	Ghatfaan Rifqi	"Duhai Sayang/Seperti Kisah"	Eliminated
Episode 14 (Thursday, April 1, 2021)	Isyana Sarasvati	7	Shaina Putri	"Sabda Rindu"	Eliminated
Episode 14 (Thursday, April 1, 2021)	Marcell Siahaan	8	Kesya Alexhandra	"Listen"	Marcell's choice
Episode 14 (Thursday, April 1, 2021)	Yura & Rizky	9	Jennefer Siregar	"You Don't Even Know Me"	Yura & Rizky's choice
Episode 14 (Thursday, April 1, 2021)	Yura & Rizky	10	Joanna Grania	"Serenata Jiwa Lara"	Eliminated
Episode 14 (Thursday, April 1, 2021)	Isyana Sarasvati	11	Diajeng Sekartaji	"All by Myself"	Isyana's choice
Episode 14 (Thursday, April 1, 2021)	Marcell Siahaan	12	Matthew Mashandro	"Rolling in the Deep"	Public's vote

Non-competition performances
Order	Performer	Song
14.1	Tiara Andini	"Gemintang Hatiku"
14.2	Iis Dahlia and Farel Ibnu	"Muara Kasih Bunda"
14.3	Tiara Andini and Ghatfaan Rifqi	"Tanpa Batas Waktu"
14.4	Lyodra Ginting and Tiara Andini	"Terlanjur Mencinta"
14.5	Lyodra Ginting and Shaina Putri	"Anganku Anganmu"
14.6	Lyodra Ginting	"Sabda Rindu"

=== Week 4: Finale (April 8) ===
The Finale consists of two rounds, Top 6 and Top 3.

==== Top 6 ====
The 6 artists performed for the votes of the public. In the finale, all artists competed each other, not based on their team. The three artist with the highest number of votes directly advanced to the Top 3.

Episode	Coach	Order	Artist	Song	Result
Episode 15 (Thursday, April 8, 2021)	Isyana Sarasvati	1	Diajeng Sekartaji	"Never Enough"	Public's vote
Episode 15 (Thursday, April 8, 2021)	Marcell Siahaan	2	Kesya Alexhandra	"The Power of Love"	Eliminated
Episode 15 (Thursday, April 8, 2021)	Yura & Rizky	3	Jennefer Siregar	"Human"	Eliminated
Episode 15 (Thursday, April 8, 2021)	Yura & Rizky	4	Faith Christabelle	"Malaikat Juga Tahu"	Public's vote
Episode 15 (Thursday, April 8, 2021)	Isyana Sarasvati	5	Nikita Mawarni	"Bohemian Rhapsody"	Public's vote
Episode 15 (Thursday, April 8, 2021)	Marcell Siahaan	6	Matthew Mashandro	"Feeling Good"	Eliminated

==== Top 3 ====
The Top 3 competed for the title as the Season's Winner.

Episode	Coach	Order	Artist	Song	Result
Episode 15 (Thursday, April 8, 2021)	Isyana Sarasvati	1	Nikita Mawarni	"Valerie"	Winner
Episode 15 (Thursday, April 8, 2021)	Yura & Rizky	2	Faith Christabelle	"Tenang"	Runner-up
Episode 15 (Thursday, April 8, 2021)	Isyana Sarasvati	3	Diajeng Sekartaji	"Cinta"	Third Place

Non-competition performances
Order	Performer	Song
15.1	Marcell Siahaan, Yura Yunita, Rizky Febian, and Isyana Sarasvati	"Can't Stop the Feeling"
15.2	Ashanty and Arsy Hermansyah	"Snowman"
15.3	Marcell Siahaan and his team (Kesya Alexhandra and Matthew Mashiandro)	"Sesuka Hatimu"
15.4	Isyana Sarasvati and her team (Diajeng Sekartaji and Nikita Mawarni)	"Sikap Duniawi"
15.5	Yura & Rizky and their team (Faith Christabelle and Jennefer Siregar)	"Melawan Demi Dunia/Merakit"
15.6	Arsy Hermansyah	"Pelangiku"
15.7	Anneth Delliecia	"Mungkin Hari Ini Esok Atau Nanti" (Indonesian & Korean version)
15.8	Kimberley Fransa	"Cute Little Savage"
15.9	Isyana Sarasvati and Adelways Lay	"Time to Say Goodbye"
15.10	Anneth Delliecia and Kimberley Fransa	"Firework"

== Elimination Charts ==
=== Overall ===
Color key
Artist's info

- Team Marcell
- Team Yura & Rizky
- Team Isyana

Result details

- Winner
- Runner-up
- Third place
- Saved by the public
- Saved by his/her coach
- Eliminated

Artists	Week 1 & 2 Top 24	Week 3 Semifinals	Week 4 Finale	
Artists	Week 1 & 2 Top 24	Week 3 Semifinals	Top 6	Top 3
Nikita Mawarni	Safe	Safe	Safe	Winner
Faith Christabelle	Safe	Safe	Safe	Runner-up
Diajeng Sekartaji	Safe	Safe	Safe	3rd Place
Jennefer Siregar	Safe	Safe	Eliminated	Eliminated (Finale)
Kesya Alexhandra	Safe	Safe	Eliminated	Eliminated (Finale)
Matthew Mashandro	Safe	Safe	Eliminated	Eliminated (Finale)
Britney Kimberley	Safe	Eliminated	Eliminated (Semifinals)	
Farel Ibnu	Safe	Eliminated	Eliminated (Semifinals)	
Ghatfaan Rifqi	Safe	Eliminated	Eliminated (Semifinals)	
Joanna Grania	Safe	Eliminated	Eliminated (Semifinals)	
Mirai Naziel	Safe	Eliminated	Eliminated (Semifinals)	
Shaina Putri	Safe	Eliminated	Eliminated (Semifinals)	
Abdul Izati	Eliminated	Eliminated (Top 24)		
Alisha Nadira	Eliminated	Eliminated (Top 24)		
Amanda Maren	Eliminated	Eliminated (Top 24)		
Cheryl Xaviera	Eliminated	Eliminated (Top 24)		
Chevira & Dhevira	Eliminated	Eliminated (Top 24)		
Fakhrizal Husaini	Eliminated	Eliminated (Top 24)		
Gebby Saragih	Eliminated	Eliminated (Top 24)		
Marcellino Putra	Eliminated	Eliminated (Top 24)		
Najla Rahel	Eliminated	Eliminated (Top 24)		
Putri Gita	Eliminated	Eliminated (Top 24)		
Regita Pramesti	Eliminated	Eliminated (Top 24)		
Safeenah Fathira	Eliminated	Eliminated (Top 24)		

=== Teams ===
Color key
Artist's info

- Team Marcell
- Team Yura & Rizky
- Team Isyana

Results details

- Winner
- Runner-up
- Third place
- Eliminated

Artists	Week 1 & 2 Top 24	Week 3 Semifinals	Week 4 Finale	
Artists	Week 1 & 2 Top 24	Week 3 Semifinals	Top 6	Top 3
Kesya Alexhandra	Coach's choice	Coach's choice	Eliminated	
Matthew Mashandro	Public's vote	Public's vote	Eliminated	
Britney Kimberley	Coach's choice	Eliminated		
Farel Ibnu	Public's vote	Eliminated		
Amanda Maren	Eliminated			
Marcellino Putra	Eliminated			
Putri Gita	Eliminated			
Safeenah Fathira	Eliminated			
Faith Christabelle	Public's vote	Public's vote	Advanced	Runner-up
Jennefer Siregar	Coach's choice	Coach's choice	Eliminated	
Ghatfaan Rifqi	Public's vote	Eliminated		
Joanna Grania	Coach's choice	Eliminated		
Cheryl Xaviera	Eliminated			
Fakhrizal Husaini	Eliminated			
Gebby Saragih	Eliminated			
Regita Pramesti	Eliminated			
Nikita Mawarni	Public's vote	Public's vote	Advanced	Winner
Diajeng Sekartaji	Coach's choice	Coach's choice	Advanced	Third Place
Mirai Naziel	Public's vote	Eliminated		
Shaina Putri	Coach's choice	Eliminated		
Abdul Izati	Eliminated			
Alisha Nadira	Eliminated			
Chevira & Dhevira	Eliminated			
Najla Rahel	Eliminated			

== Artists who appeared on previous shows or season ==
- Hadijah Shahab was a children actress that became famous after starring a soap opera entitled "Tangan-Tangan Mungil" as Lilu, a little robot. The soap opera aired in RCTI at 2013.
- Britney Kimberly appeared on the first, second and third season of Indonesian Idol Junior in 2014, 2016, and 2018 and was eliminated in second elimination round, Top 13 and showcase round respectively. She also appeared on the fifth season of Idola Cilik in 2015 and was eliminated in Menuju Pentas round.
- Cheryl Xaviera, Larissa Biel, Nakisha Thalita, Nikita Mawarni and Vasilysa Stefanovna appeared on the third season of Indonesian Idol Junior in 2018 and were eliminated in first elimination round.
- Alisha Nadira appeared on the second season of Indonesian Idol Junior in 2016 and was eliminated in group round.
- Mirai Naziel and Badnur Razky appeared on the third season of Indonesian Idol Junior in 2018 and were eliminated in Top 8 and second elimination round respectively.
- Safeenah Vidri appeared on the second season in 2016, but failed to turn any chairs.
- Olivia Christie and Nataya Angeleius appeared on the first season of Pop Academy in 2020 and was eliminated in Top 40 and final audition round respectively.
- Chelsea Jove appeared on the third season in 2018, but failed to turn any chairs.
