= The Voice Kids Indonesia (TV series) =

Television series

- Genre: Reality television
- Created by: John de Mol Jr.
- Presented by: Ananda Omesh; Ersa Mayori; Dian Ayu Lestari; Kaneishia Yusuf; Kimberley Fransa; Okky Lukman
- Judges: Agnez Mo; Bebi Romeo; Tulus; Kaka; Marcell; Rizky Febian & Yura Yunita; Isyana Sarasvati; Armand Maulana; Judika; Ari Lasso; Anggun; Nino Kayam & Vidi Aldiano
- Country of origin: Indonesia
- Original language: Indonesian
- No. of seasons: 4
- No. of episodes: 45

Production
- Executive producer: John de Mol
- Running time: 120–150 minutes
- Production companies: Talpa (2016 until 2018); ITV Studios (2021-present)

Original release
- Network: GTV
- Release: 26 August 2016 – present

Related
- The Voice Indonesia; The Voice (franchise)

The Voice Kids Indonesia is an Indonesian music talent show for young singers aged 8 to 15, based on the concept of the show The Voice Indonesia. The first broadcast was on August 26, 2016, on GTV (formerly Global TV). The show has initially aired three seasons from 2016 to 2018. The fourth season was in 2021, scheduled after a two-year break.

== Format ==
=== Blind Auditions ===
For the Blind Auditions, each contestant takes the stage individually and sings to an audience and a panel of judges who have their chairs turned away from the singers. In a blind audition, only the judges make the decision on the quality of the contestant's voice. However, the studio audience are listening in on the performance, as are viewers of the TV show. If the judge likes the contestant's voice, they will hit the "I WANT YOU" button which makes their chair rotate to face the stage. Contestants selected by more than one judge must choose a judge to accompany them to the next round. If no judges hit the "I WANT YOU" button, the contestants do not move on to the next round.

=== Battle Rounds ===
Three singers compete by singing individually, and the coach chooses a winner. Winners advance to the Sing Off. Contestants that do not win are eliminated.

=== Sing Off ===
All artists who advanced from the battle rounds will sing a song on the sing-off. In each team, only four acts shall be chosen to go to the semifinals.

=== Live Shows ===
Each contestant will sing 'live' in front of the coach and viewers. In the semifinals, the entire Indonesian audience will determine which contestants will proceed to the next round through the voting system.

=== Grand Final ===
This round is the final round that will determine the champion of The Voice Kids Indonesia.

== Coaches and hosts ==
=== Coaches ===
Timeline of coaches
Coach	Seasons			
Coach	1	2	3	4
Agnez Mo				
Bebi Romeo				
Tulus				
Marcell Siahaan				
Kaka				
Isyana Sarasvati				
Rizky Febian & Yura Yunita				

=== Hosts ===
Timeline of hosts
Host	Seasons			
Host	1	2	3	4
Ananda Omesh				
Ersa Mayori				
Kaneishia Yusuf				
Dian Ayu Lestari				
Kimberley Fransa				
Okky Lukman				

Legend
Featured as a main host.
Featured as a backstage host.
Featured as an online host.
Featured as a guest host.

== Coaches' advisors ==
Season	Team Bebi	Team Agnez	Team Tulus
1	Nola	Ahmad Dhani	Andien Aisyah
2	Wizzy Williana	Baim	Yura Yunita
3	Team Kaka	Team Agnez	Team Marcell
3	Citra Scholastika	Sammy Simorangkir	Rinni Wulandari
4	Team Marcell	Team Rizky & Yura	Team Isyana
4	Wizzy	Ardhito Pramono	Nino Kayam

== Coaches' teams ==
- Winning coach/contestant
- Runner-up coach/contestant
- Second runner-up coach/contestant

notes :

- Winners are in bold
- Finalists are in italic
- Eliminated contestants are in small font

Season	Coaches and their finalists		
1	Bebi Romeo	Agnez Mo	Tulus
1	Tasya Sherin; Rafi Galsa; Fahira Rizani; Kaneishia Yusuf	Angelia Domianus; Eygra Sinuhaji; Sosila Mega; Michelle Tan	**Christopher Edgar**; Dru Nuca; Theresia Gultom; Shyakira Fatiha
2	Kimberley Fransa; Vitara Harahap; Kesha Marisa; Rafa Ramaniya	**Sharla Martiza**; Anneth Delliecia; Wassisco Lianro; Shakira Peteonela	Anggis Devaki; Mutiara Naycilla; Aditya Majid; Glory Satya
3	Kaka	Agnez Mo	Marcell
3	**Keva Hamzah**; Vanisya Humaira; Moses Bradley; Shakila Syaputri	Tyara Rafanaura; Nadhia Aryasa; Niko Nathaniel; Wimas Shahnata	Vanessa Simorangkir; Meiska Adinda; Chaterine Evelyna; Hendrik Korwa
4	Marcell	Yura & Rizky	Isyana
4	Kesya Alexhandra; Matthew Mashandro; Britney Kimberley; Farel Ibnu	Faith Christabelle; Jennefer Siregar; Ghatfaan Rifqi; Joanna Grania	**Nikita Mawarni**; Diajeng Sekartaji; Mirai Naziel; Shaina Putri

== Series overview ==
Warning: the following table presents a significant amount of different colors.

The Voice Kids Indonesia series overview
Season	First aired	Last aired	Winner	Runner-up	Third place	Winning coach	Hosts		Coaches (chairs' order)		
Season	First aired	Last aired	Winner	Runner-up	Third place	Winning coach	Main	Backstage	1	2	3
1	26 Aug 2016	2 Dec 2016	Christopher Edgar	Raja Giannuca	Tasya Sherin	Tulus	Ananda Omesh	Ersa Mayori	Bebi	Agnez	Tulus
2	7 Sep 2017	14 Dec 2017	Sharla Martiza	Anggis Devaki	Kimberley Fransa	Agnez Mo	Ananda Omesh	Ersa Mayori	Bebi	Agnez	Tulus
3	28 June 2018	4 Oct 2018	Keva Hamzah	Tyara Rafanaura	Vanessa Fritzie	Kaka Satriaji	Ananda Omesh	Dian Ayu Lestari	Kaka	Agnez	Marcell
4	4 Feb 2021	8 Apr 2021	Nikita Mawarni	Faith Christabelle	Diajeng Sekartaji	Isyana Sarasvati	Ananda Omesh	Ersa Mayori	Marcell	Yura & Rizky	Isyana
