= Sharla Martiza =

- Birth name: Sharla Martiza Isya'iah Putri
- Also known as: Sharla Martiza
- Born: November 7, 2003 (age 21); Jombang, East Java, Indonesia
- Origin: Jombang
- Genres: Pop; R&B; Middle-Eastern; Kasidah
- Occupation: Singer
- Instruments: Vocal
- Years active: 2017–present
- Labels: Hits Records
- influenced Maher Zain

Sharla Martiza Isya'iah Putri (born November 7, 2003) is an Indonesian singer. She is known as the winner of the singing talent show The Voice Kids Indonesia the second season that aired on television station Global TV in 2017. In the Blind Audition joined the team Agnez Mo.

== The Voice Kids Indonesia ==
Sharla became popular in Indonesia after she performed Maher Zain's song Assalamu Alayka during Blind Audition. When Sharla audition sang Cats' Memory song and only Agnez Mo spun, then asked Sharla what kind of song she liked. Sharla replies that she likes Kasidah songs, and then Agnez Mo immediately asks to sing the song of the kasidah and Sharla sings Maher Zain's Assalamu Alayka song. After Sharla sang the song, her video became popular in social media. The video became trending on YouTube for days. Even Maher Zain uploaded the video on his Instagram. At the semi-finals, Sharla had the opportunity to be called by Maher Zain. Maher Zain reveals if he is happy and amazed when Sharla sings his song which he then uploads on his personal Instagram.

=== Performances on The Voice Kids Indonesia ===
Stage	Song	Original Artist	Date	Order	Result
Blind Audition	"Memory"	Cats	October 26, 2017	8.10	Only one chair turned join team Agnez Mo defaulted
Battle Round	"Desert Rose" (vs. Gadis vs. Sabita)	Sting	November 16, 2017	11.4	Saved by her coach
Sing Off	"New Rules"	Dua Lipa	November 30, 2017	13.7	Saved by her coach
Semifinal	"Hide and Seek"	Agnez Mo	December 7, 2017	14.10	Saved by public vote
1st round Grand Final	"Nirmala"	Siti Nurhaliza	December 14, 2017	15.4	Saved by public vote
2nd round Grand Final	"Beautiful Liar"	Beyonce & Shakira	December 14, 2017	15.8	Winner

== Awards and nominations ==
=== The Voice Kids Indonesia ===
Year	Nominee/Work	Awards	Result
2017	Sharla Martiza	The Voice Kids Indonesia	Won
2017	Sharla Martiza	The Most Viral Video	Won

== Discography ==
- Generasi Pemenang (2017)
- Ya Rasulullah (Isfa'lana) (2018)
- Tadarus (2019)
- Rindu Rasulullah (2021)
- Ramadhan (2021)
- Hati Yang Salah (2022)

Awards and achievements
Preceded by Christopher Edgar	The Voice Kids Indonesia; Winner; 2017	Succeeded by Keva Hamzah
