= The Voice Kids Indonesia season 3 =

The Voice Kids Indonesia
- Season 3
- Hosted by: Ananda Omesh; Dian Ayu Lestari; Kimberley Fransa
- Coaches: Kaka Satriaji; Agnez Mo; Marcell Siahaan
- Winner: Keva Hamzah
- Winning coach: Kaka Satriaji
- Runner-up: Tyara Rafanaura

Release
- Original network: GTV
- Original release: June 28 – October 4, 2018

Season chronology
- ← Previous; Season 2 Next → Season 4

The third season of the Indonesian reality talent show The Voice Kids Indonesia premiered in 2018 on GTV with Agnez Mo returning as coach. Kaka Satriaji and Marcell Siahaan replaced Bebi Romeo and Tulus, respectively.

== Auditions ==
City	Location	Date
Medan, North Sumatera	Istana Koki	March 4, 2018
Kupang, East Nusa Tenggara	RRI Kupang	March 4, 2018
Mataram, West Nusa Tenggara	Mataram Music Lombok	March 11, 2018
Makassar, South Sulawesi	Hotel Pesonna Makassar	March 11, 2018
Palembang, South Sumatera	Live Coffee & Bistro	March 11, 2018
Ambon, Maluku	Hotel Amaris Ambon	March 18, 2018
Malang, East Java	Kaizen Music School Ruko Borobudur	March 18, 2018
Balikpapan, East Kalimantan	Radio Onix	March 18, 2018
Yogyakarta	UC Hotel UGM	March 25, 2018
Batam, Riau Islands	The Evitel Hotel	March 25, 2018
Surabaya, East Java	Grand Inna Tunjungan	March 25, 2018
Bandung, West Java	Bandung Creative HUBM	March 31, 2018
DKI Jakarta	MNC Studios, Kebon Jeruk	April 7 & 8, 2018
Denpasar, Bali	Phoenix Radio	April 8, 2018
Manado, North Sulawesi	Manado FM	April 8, 2018

== Coaches & Hosts ==
=== Coach ===
- Kaka Satriaji
- Agnez Mo
- Marcell Siahaan

=== Host ===
- Ananda Omesh
- Dian Ayu Lestari
- Kimberley Fransa

== Teams ==
Color key:

- Winner
- Runner-up
- Third place
- Eliminated in the Finals
- Eliminated in the Semifinals
- Eliminated in the Live Shows
- Eliminated in the Battle rounds

Coaches	Top 72 artists					
Kaka Satriaji						
Kaka Satriaji	Keva Hamzah	Vanisya Humaira	Moses Bradley	Shakila Syaputri	Fire Amanda	Jeni & Joni
Kaka Satriaji	Maysha Jhuan	Octrin Saparuane	Andini Sekar	Andrew Warren	Angela Nitti	Ardhana Mesvari
Kaka Satriaji	Aulia Shabrina	Benediva Ambarita	Berliana Cinta	Cello Elby	Florence Agatha	Jenny Glory
Kaka Satriaji	Kathlynn Chandra	Kesia Tamariska	Kiara Louise	Qyra Borneo	Shandy Aulia	Teresa Katarina
Agnez Mo						
Agnez Mo	Tyara Rafanaura	Nadhia Aryasa	Niko Nathaniel	Wimas Shahnata	Alisha Sadiya	Billy Christopher
Agnez Mo	Caecilia Laura	Siti Manzilah	Alyssa Destriana	Amanda Dahlia	Angel Maharani	Bidadari Ananda
Agnez Mo	Evelyn Aprillya	Geltri Sabrina	Ghania Mahira	Gylbert Chrismiguel	Indah Gitania	Jelita Aprilia
Agnez Mo	Khansa Salsabila	Ninaya Ilona	Reink Ferguson	Ryura Assyifa	Seraphine Beatrice	Sofie Anastasya
Marcell Siahaan						
Marcell Siahaan	Vanessa Fritzie	Meiska Adinda	Chaterine Evelyna	Hendrik Korwa	Billy Sembiring	Glorivay Assa
Marcell Siahaan	Syarla Martiza	Syifa Dinova	Adelle Naila	Aisha Qatrunada	Akilah Nasywa	Amadea Qureta
Marcell Siahaan	Angelica Brasali	Attha Hirah	Charissa Ramona	Devina Elysia	Elisabet Grace	Erwyn Sunyoto
Marcell Siahaan	Glenda Ruselia	Maurichio Pranugra	Nanda Monica	Rizal Matantu	Sakira Ramadhani	Yera Benu

== Blind auditions ==
Color key:

✔	Coach hit his/her "I WANT YOU" button
	Artist defaulted to this coach's team
	Artist elected to join this coach's team
	Artist eliminated with no coach pressing his or her "I WANT YOU" button

=== Episode 1 (June 28) ===
Order	Artist	Age	Hometown	Song	Coaches and Artists Choices		
Order	Artist	Age	Hometown	Song	Kaka	Agnez	Marcell
1	Berliana Cinta	14	Pasuruan	"Smells Like Teen Spirit"	✔	–	–
2	Hendrik Korwa	12	Manokwari	"Mama Papa Larang"	✔	–	✔
3	Ardhana Mesvari	13	Yogyakarta	"City of Stars"	✔	–	–
4	Wimas Shahnata	14	Denpasar	"Location"	–	✔	✔
5	Rosalie Yanurula	14	Bandung	"I Don't Want to Miss a Thing"	–	–	–
6	Cello Elby	12	Surabaya	"Kamulah Satu-satunya"	✔	✔	✔
7	Tyara Rafanaura	13	Aceh	"Rise Up"	✔	✔	–
8	Angeline Victoria	15	Surabaya	"Issues"	–	–	–
9	Alisha Sadiya	14	Jakarta	"Mother, May I Sleep with Danger?"	✔	✔	✔
10	Chaterine Evelyna	15	Surabaya	"Lost Stars"	–	–	✔
11	Maria Ivana	15	Medan	"Bird Set Free"	–	–	–
12	Adelle Naila	13	Jakarta	"Leaving on a Jet Plane"	✔	–	✔

=== Episode 2 (July 5) ===
Order	Artist	Age	Hometown	Song	Coaches and Artists Choices		
Order	Artist	Age	Hometown	Song	Kaka	Agnez	Marcell
1	Kesia Tamariska	14	Klaten	"Anak Jalanan"	✔	–	–
2	Zahrah Izzaty	6	Palembang	"Reflection"	–	–	–
3	Caecilia Laura	12	Jakarta	"Halo"	–	✔	–
4	Syarla Martiza	14	Tenggarong	"Jangan Hilangkan Dia"	–	–	✔
5	Billy Christopher	13	Denpasar	"Jealous"	✔	✔	✔
6	Nikita Becker	14	Bekasi	"Love On Top"	–	–	–
7	Moses Bradley	10	Batam	"Welcome to the Jungle"	✔	✔	✔
8	Amanda Dahlia	14	Bali	"Piece by Piece"	✔	✔	–
9	Vanessa Fritzie	14	Pematang Siantar	"Dusk Till Dawn"	–	✔	✔
10	Syakilla Putri	14	Sidoarjo	"Best Part"	–	–	–
11	Andini Sekar	14	Tangerang	"A Woman's Worth"	✔	–	✔
12	Siti Manzilah	14	Jakarta	"Untuk Perempuan yang Sedang di Pelukan"	✔	✔	–
13	Gregorius Andreas	12	Medan	"Fallin'"	–	–	–

=== Episode 3 (July 12) ===
Order	Artist	Age	Hometown	Song	Coaches and Artists Choices		
Order	Artist	Age	Hometown	Song	Kaka	Agnez	Marcell
1	Syifa Dinova	14	Samarinda	"Runnin' (Lose It All)"	–	✔	✔
2	Maysha Jhuan	12	Serang	"Losing My Religion"	✔	–	–
3	Meiska Adinda	14	Denpasar	"Rindu"	✔	✔	✔
4	Sorenza Nuryanti	10	Lombok	"Casual Girl"	–	–	–
5	Charissa Ramona	7	Semarang	"Doo Be Doo"	✔	–	✔
6	Jeni & Joni	14 & 14	Kupang	"Ingin Kumiliki"	✔	–	✔
7	Camillia Azzahra	13	Bandung	"Bimbang"	–	–	–
8	Seraphine Beatrice	13	Surabaya	"Believer"	✔	✔	–
9	Yedija Christian	15	Malang	"Imagination"	–	–	–
10	Ryura Assyifa	12	Solo	"All Falls Down"	✔	✔	✔
11	Reink Ferguson	14	Bekasi	"Hey, Soul Sister"	–	✔	–
12	Jesi Hamzah	14	Lombok	"Andaikan Kau Datang"	–	–	–
13	Qyra Borneo	10	Pontianak	"The Spirit Carries On"	✔	–	–

=== Episode 4 (July 19) ===
Order	Artist	Age	Hometown	Song	Coaches and Artists Choices		
Order	Artist	Age	Hometown	Song	Kaka	Agnez	Marcell
1	Kathlynn Chandra	8	Jakarta	"It's Oh So Quiet"	✔	–	–
2	Maurichio Pranugra	15	Mataram	"Something I Need"	✔	–	✔
3	Raisha Stefhany	14	Jakarta	"Hurt"	–	–	–
4	Gylbert Chrismiguel	13	Medan	"A Change Is Gonna Come"	✔	✔	✔
5	Elisabet Grace	13	Medan	"Titip Rindu Buat Ayah"	✔	–	✔
6	Mikayla Angelee	9	Malang	"Coke Bottle"	–	–	–
7	Akilah Nasyawanda	15	Jakarta	"Can't Remember to Forget You"	–	–	✔
8	Shandy Aulia	14	Medan	"Kekasih Bayangan"	✔	–	–
9	Glenda Ruselia	9	Tangerang	"Bento"	✔	✔	✔
10	Patricia Maureen	14	Jakarta	"Fighter"	–	–	–
11	Teresa Katarina	14	Jakarta	"Lips Are Movin'"	✔	–	–
12	Willyam Gosal	15	North Morowali	"High Hopes"	–	–	–
13	Ninaya Ilona	12	Malang	"Mercy"	–	✔	–

=== Episode 5 (July 26) ===
Order	Artist	Age	Hometown	Song	Coaches and Artists Choices		
Order	Artist	Age	Hometown	Song	Kaka	Agnez	Marcell
1	Andrew Warren	8	Jakarta	"Oh! Darling"	✔	–	–
2	Geltri Sabrina	13	Medan	"How Long"	–	✔	–
3	Adinda Shafaa	12	Surabaya	"FourFiveSeconds"	–	–	–
4	Fire Amanda	14	Banyuwangi	"Terlalu Manis"	✔	–	✔
5	Keva Hamzah	11	Bali	"When We Were Young"	✔	✔	✔
6	Chelsea Joves	11	Batam	"Never Enough"	–	–	–
7	Jelita Aprilia	14	Serang	"Run to You"	✔	✔	✔
8	Erwyn Sunyoto	15	Surabaya	"Lebih Indah"	✔	–	✔
9	Glorivay Assa	15	Manado	"Pemeran Utama"	–	✔	✔
10	Ruben Marcello	13	Makassar	"Beauty And A Beat"	–	–	–
11	Khansa Salsabilla	12	Tasikmalaya	"Without You"	✔	✔	–
12	Shiloh Zeta	10	Surabaya	"Starving"	–	–	–
13	Jenny Glory	13	Ambon	"Remaja"	✔	–	–

=== Episode 6 (August 2) ===
Order	Artist	Age	Hometown	Song	Coaches and Artists Choices		
Order	Artist	Age	Hometown	Song	Kaka	Agnez	Marcell
1	Niko Nathaniel	15	Bengkulu	"Blue Suede Shoes"	✔	✔	✔
2	Yera Benu	14	Kupang	"I Will Always Love You"	–	–	✔
3	Indah Gitania	12	Denpasar	"It's a Man's Man's Man's World”	–	✔	✔
4	Victoria Angelia	10	Jakarta	"The Impossible Dream"	–	–	–
5	Vanisya Humaira	9	Medan	"She's Gone"	✔	✔	✔
6	Amadea Qureta	14	Jakarta	"Love on the Brain"	✔	–	✔
7	Joaquine Bernessa	12	Jakarta	"Here	–	–	–
8	Nadhia Aryasa	15	Gianyar	"All by Myself"	–	✔	–
9	Safira Salsabilla	14	Makassar	"Pudar"	–	–	–
10	Attha Hiraah	13	Palembang	"Time to Say Goodbye"	–	–	✔
11	Florence Agatha	14	Jakarta	"Jangan Gila"	✔	–	–
12	Devina Elysia	9	Yogyakarta	"Perahu Kertas"	✔	–	✔
13	Aqeel Abdurahman	13	Cilegon	"Khayalan Tingkat Tinggi"	–	–	–

=== Episode 7 (August 9) ===
Order	Artist	Age	Hometown	Song	Coaches and Artists Choices		
Order	Artist	Age	Hometown	Song	Kaka	Agnez	Marcell
1	Ghania Mahira	12	Malang	"Helium"	✔	✔	–
2	Chiesa Jeanniva	13	Ambon	"Three Little Birds"	–	–	–
3	Benediva Ambarita	10	Medan	"Roar"	✔	–	–
4	Sofie Anastasya	11	Payakumbuh	"Turning Tables"	✔	✔	✔
5	Angela Nitti	13	Tangerang	"Don't You Remember"	✔	–	–
6	Rizal Matantu	15	Manado	"Sahabat Jadi Cinta"	–	–	✔
7	Angelica Brasali	14	Jakarta	"Kasmaran"	✔	–	✔
8	Syahdan Ainur	14	Garut	"Here Without You"	–	–	–
9	Shakila Syaputri	12	Cilegon	"Almost Is Never Enough"	✔	✔	✔
10	Edlyn Louisa	13	Jakarta	"River"	–	–	–
11	Aisha Qatrunada	11	Palembang	"To Love You More"	–	✔	✔
12	Mozez Hutapea	11	Balikpapan	"Cheap Thrills"	–	–	–
13	Nanda Monica	14	Denpasar	"Jatuh Hati"	–	✔	✔

=== Episode 8 (August 16) ===
Order	Artist	Age	Hometown	Song	Coaches and Artists Choices		
Order	Artist	Age	Hometown	Song	Kaka	Agnez	Marcell
1	Kiara Louise	13	Denpasar	"Riptide"	✔	–	–
2	Angel Maharani	14	Bandung	"Young Dumb & Broke"	–	✔	✔
3	Kalya Vanessa	14	Jakarta	"Wild Things"	–	–	–
4	Octrin Saparuane	13	Ambon	"Muskurane"	✔	✔	✔
5	Aqillah Nabiela	15	Makassar	"Aku Cuma Punya Hati"	–	–	–
6	Alyssa Destriana	12	Tangerang	"Cinta Sejati"	–	✔	–
7	Angeline Natasya	14	Jakarta	"Be the One"	–	–	–
8	Evelyn Aprillya	15	Palembang	"Crazy"	✔	✔	✔
9	Billy Sembiring	14	Jakarta	"Firasat"	–	–	✔
10	Aulia Shabrina	13	Jakarta	"Stand by You"	✔	–	–
11	Sakira Ramadhani	13	Batam	"Senandung Maaf"	Team full	–	✔
12	Bidadari Ananda	13	Palembang	"Chasing Pavements"	Team full	✔	Team full

== The Battles ==
The third season's advisors include: Citra Scholastika for Team Kaka, Sammy Simorangkir for Team Agnez and Rini Wulandari for Team Marcell.

Color key:

Artist won the Battle and advanced to the Live Shows
Artist lost the Battle and was eliminated

Episode	Coach	Order	Winner	Song	Losers	
Episode 9 (Sunday, August. 23, 2018)	Marcell Siahaan	1	Syifa Dinova	"I'm in Love with a Monster"	Amadea Qureta	Glenda Ruselia
Episode 9 (Sunday, August. 23, 2018)	Agnez Monica	2	Tyara Rafanaura	"Muda (Le O Le O)"	Geltri Sabrina	Ryura Assyifa
Episode 9 (Sunday, August. 23, 2018)	Kaka Satriaji	3	Octrin Saparuane	"Ayah"	Shandy Aulia	Teresa Katarina
Episode 9 (Sunday, August. 23, 2018)	Kaka Satriaji	4	Fire Amanda	"Bring Me to Life"	Aulia Shabrina	Kesia Tamariska
Episode 9 (Sunday, August. 23, 2018)	Marcell Siahaan	5	Hendrik Korwa	"Cinta Kita"	Adelle Naila	Attha Hirah
Episode 9 (Sunday, August. 23, 2018)	Kaka Satriaji	6	Keva Hamzah	"IDGAF"	Andini Sekar	Kiara Louise
Episode 9 (Sunday, August. 23, 2018)	Agnez Monica	7	Alisha Sadiya	"Me and Mrs. Jones"	Bidadari Ananda	Khansa Salsabila
Episode 9 (Sunday, August. 23, 2018)	Marcell Siahaan	8	Glorivay Assa	"The Power of Love"	Angelica Brasali	Sakira Ramadhani
Episode 10 (Sunday, August. 30, 2018)	Kaka Satriaji	1	Vanisya Humaira	"Juwita Malam"	Benediva Ambarita	Qyra Borneo
Episode 10 (Sunday, August. 30, 2018)	Agnez Monica	2	Wimas Shahnata	"Unforgettable"	Angel Maharani	Seraphine Beatrice
Episode 10 (Sunday, August. 30, 2018)	Marcell Siahaan	3	Meiska Adinda	"Peri Cintaku"	Erwyn Sunyoto	Yera Benu
Episode 10 (Sunday, August. 30, 2018)	Kaka Satriaji	4	Shakila Syaputri	"Because of You"	Berliana Cinta	Jenny Glory
Episode 10 (Sunday, August. 30, 2018)	Marcell Siahaan	5	Catherine Evelyna	"For You"	Aisha Qatrunada	Nanda Monica
Episode 10 (Sunday, August. 30, 2018)	Agnez Monica	6	Niko Nathaniel	"Jailhouse Rock"	Evelyn Aprillya	Reink Ferguson
Episode 10 (Sunday, August. 30, 2018)	Marcell Siahaan	7	Vanessa Fritzie	"Ashes"	Akilah Nasywa	Devina Elysia
Episode 10 (Sunday, August. 30, 2018)	Agnez Monica	8	Nadhia Aryasa	"Be Brave"	Jelita Aprilia	Ninaya Ilona
Episode 11 (Sunday, September. 6, 2018)	Kaka Satriaji	1	Moses Bradley	"I Miss You but I Hate You"	Andrew Warren	Kathlynn Chandra
Episode 11 (Sunday, September. 6, 2018)	Agnez Monica	2	Caecilia Laura	"Give Me One Reason"	Gylbert Chrismiguel	Indah Gitania
Episode 11 (Sunday, September. 6, 2018)	Marcell Siahaan	3	Syarla Martiza	"Seperti yang Kau Minta"	Elisabet Grace	Rizal Matantu
Episode 11 (Sunday, September. 6, 2018)	Kaka Satriaji	4	Jeni & Joni	"Perfect Duet"	Angela Nitti	Ardhana Mesvari
Episode 11 (Sunday, September. 6, 2018)	Agnez Monica	5	Billy Christopher	"Like You'll Never See Me Again"	Alyssa Destriana	Sofie Anastasya
Episode 11 (Sunday, September. 6, 2018)	Marcell Siahaan	6	Billy Sembiring	"Jadi Milikku"	Charissa Ramona	Maurichio Pranugra
Episode 11 (Sunday, September. 6, 2018)	Agnez Monica	7	Siti Manzilah	"Gravity"	Amanda Dahlia	Ghania Mahira
Episode 11 (Sunday, September. 6, 2018)	Kaka Satriaji	8	Maysha Jhuan	"Creep"	Cello Elby	Florence Agatha

== Live Shows ==
Color key

Artist was saved by the Public's votes
Artist was saved by the Coach's choices
Artist was eliminated

=== Week 1 ===
During the first Live Shows, the 12 artists performed for the votes of the public. The artist with the highest number of votes on each team directly advanced to the Semifinals. Then, on the end of the show, each coach completing their respective teams with their own choice.

Episode	Coach	Order	Artist	Song	Result
Episode 12 (September 13)	Kaka Satriaji	1	Vanisya Humaira	"Who's Lovin' You"	Kaka's choice
Episode 12 (September 13)	Kaka Satriaji	2	Jeni & Joni	"Beauty and the Beast"	Eliminated
Episode 12 (September 13)	Kaka Satriaji	3	Fire Amanda	"Bintang Kehidupan"	Eliminated
Episode 12 (September 13)	Kaka Satriaji	4	Shakila Syaputri	"Saving All My Love for You"	Public's vote
Episode 12 (September 13)	Marcell Siahaan	5	Hendrik Korwa	"I Will Always Love You"	Public's vote
Episode 12 (September 13)	Marcell Siahaan	6	Glorivay Assa	"Wuthering Heights"	Eliminated
Episode 12 (September 13)	Marcell Siahaan	7	Syifa Dinova	"Lagi Syantik"	Eliminated
Episode 12 (September 13)	Marcell Siahaan	8	Meiska Adinda	"Footprints in the Sand"	Marcell's choice
Episode 12 (September 13)	Agnez Mo	9	Niko Nathaniel	"Say Something"	Agnez's choice
Episode 12 (September 13)	Agnez Mo	10	Alisha Sadiya	"Come Together"	Eliminated
Episode 12 (September 13)	Agnez Mo	11	Wimas Shahnata	"I Can't Make You Love Me"	Public's vote
Episode 12 (September 13)	Agnez Mo	12	Caecilia Laura	"Tell Me You Love Me"	Eliminated

Non-competition performances
Order	Performer	Song
12.1	All Artists	"This Is Me"

=== Week 2 ===
During the first Live Shows, the 12 artists performed for the votes of the public. The artist who picked by their own coach directly advanced to the Semifinals. Then, on the end of the show, The artist with the highest number of votes on each team completing their respective teams.

Episode	Coach	Order	Artist	Song	Result
Episode 13 (September 20)	Kaka Satriaji	1	Moses Bradley	"Rock and Roll"	Kaka's choice
Episode 13 (September 20)	Kaka Satriaji	2	Keva Hamzah	"Writing's on the Wall"	Public's vote
Episode 13 (September 20)	Kaka Satriaji	3	Octrin Saparuane	"All I Ask"	Eliminated
Episode 13 (September 20)	Kaka Satriaji	4	Maysha Jhuan	"2002"	Eliminated
Episode 13 (September 20)	Agnez Mo	5	Tyara Rafanaura	"Mamma Knows Best"	Agnez's choice
Episode 13 (September 20)	Agnez Mo	6	Siti Manzilah	"Keroncong Kemayoran"	Eliminated
Episode 13 (September 20)	Agnez Mo	7	Nadhia Aryasa	"Chandelier"	Public's vote
Episode 13 (September 20)	Agnez Mo	8	Billy Christopher	"Too Good at Goodbyes"	Eliminated
Episode 13 (September 20)	Marcell Siahaan	9	Syarla Martiza	"Bukan Cinta Biasa"	Eliminated
Episode 13 (September 20)	Marcell Siahaan	10	Catherine Evelyna	"Fix You"	Marcell's choice
Episode 13 (September 20)	Marcell Siahaan	11	Billy Sembiring	"Beneath Your Beautiful"	Eliminated
Episode 13 (September 20)	Marcell Siahaan	12	Vanessa Fritzie	"Unconditionally"	Public's vote

Non-competition performances
Order	Performer	Song
12.2	All Artists	"Neon Lights"

=== Semifinals ===
During the Semifinals, the 12 artists performed for the votes of the public. The artist who picked by their own coach directly advanced to the Finals. Then, on the end of the show, The artist with the highest number of votes on each team completing their respective teams.

Episode	Coach	Order	Artist	Song	Result
Episode 14 (September 27)	Agnez Mo	1	Niko Nathaniel	"Feeling Good"	Eliminated
Episode 14 (September 27)	Agnez Mo	2	Tyara Rafanaura	"Ujung Pasir"	Agnez's choice
Episode 14 (September 27)	Agnez Mo	3	Wimas Shahnata	"Toxic"	Eliminated
Episode 14 (September 27)	Agnez Mo	4	Nadhia Aryasa	"Stand Up for Love"	Public's vote
Episode 14 (September 27)	Kaka Satriaji	5	Keva Hamzah	"Girl on Fire"	Public's vote
Episode 14 (September 27)	Kaka Satriaji	6	Vanisya Humaira	"Butet/Sik Sik Sibatumanikam"	Kaka's choice
Episode 14 (September 27)	Kaka Satriaji	7	Shakila Syaputri	"One Last Cry"	Eliminated
Episode 14 (September 27)	Kaka Satriaji	8	Moses Bradley	"You Give Love a Bad Name"	Eliminated
Episode 14 (September 27)	Marcell Siahaan	9	Hendrik Korwa	"Jikalau Kau Cinta"	Eliminated
Episode 14 (September 27)	Marcell Siahaan	10	Meiska Adinda	"Andaikan Kau Datang"	Marcell's choice
Episode 14 (September 27)	Marcell Siahaan	11	Vanessa Fritzie	"Scared to Be Lonely"	Public's vote
Episode 14 (September 27)	Marcell Siahaan	12	Catherine Evelyna	"Malaikat Juga Tahu"	Eliminated

Non-competition performances
Order	Performer	Song
14.1	All Artists	"Stronger (What Doesn't Kill You)"

=== Finals ===
All finalist performed on October 4, 2018. During the Finals, the 6 artists performed for the votes of the public. The 3 artists with the highest number of votes directly advanced to the Top 3.

Grand Final

Episode	Coach	Order	Artist	Song	Result
Episode 15 (October 4)	Kaka Satriaji	1	Vanisya Humaira	"I Surrender"	Eliminated
Episode 15 (October 4)	Kaka Satriaji	2	Keva Hamzah	"Hello"	Public's vote
Episode 15 (October 4)	Marcell Siahaan	3	Meiska Adinda	"The Power of Love"	Eliminated
Episode 15 (October 4)	Marcell Siahaan	4	Vanessa Fritzie	"Snow on the Sahara"	Public's vote
Episode 15 (October 4)	Agnez Mo	5	Tyara Rafanaura	"Dengan Menyebut Nama Allah (from Regret)/Tanah Airku"	Public's vote
Episode 15 (October 4)	Agnez Mo	6	Nadhia Aryasa	"My Heart Will Go On"	Eliminated

Finale

Episode	Coach	Order	Artist	Song	Result
Episode 15 (October 4)	Marcel Siahaan	1	Vanessa Fritzie	"Risalah Hati"	Third place
Episode 15 (October 4)	Agnez Mo	2	Tyara Rafanaura	"I Don't Want To Miss A Thing/Who You Are"	Runner-up
Episode 15 (October 4)	Kaka Satriaji	3	Keva Hamzah	"Diamonds"	Winner

Non-competition performances
Order	Performer	Song
15.1	Kaka Satriaji with his team (Keva Hamzah and Vanisya Humaira)	"Pandangan Pertama"
15.2	Marcell Siahaan with his team (Meiska Adinda and Vanessa Simorangkir)	"Hanya Memuji"
15.3	Agnez Mo with her team (Nadhia Aryasa and Tyara Rafanaura)	"Bilang Saja"
15.4	Sharla Martiza	"Laksmana Raja di Laut"
15.5	Agnez Mo	"Long As I Get Paid"
15.6	Slank	"Bang Bang Tut/I Miss You But I Hate You"
15.7	Keva Hamzah	"Suaramu Tak Terganti"

== Elimination Chart ==
=== Overall ===
Color key
Artist's info

- Team Kaka
- Team Agnez
- Team Marcell

Result details

- Winner
- Runner-up
- Third place
- Saved by the public
- Saved by his/her coach
- Eliminated
- Artist did not perform on that particular week

Artists	Week 1 & 2 Top 24	Week 3 Semifinals	Week 4 Finale	
Artists	Week 1 & 2 Top 24	Week 3 Semifinals	Top 6	Top 3
Keva Hamzah	Safe	Safe	Safe	Winner
Tyara Rafanaura	Safe	Safe	Safe	Runner-up
Vanessa Fritzie	Safe	Safe	Safe	3rd place
Meiska Adinda	Safe	Safe	Eliminated	Eliminated (Finale, Top 6)
Nadhia Aryasa	Safe	Safe	Eliminated	Eliminated (Finale, Top 6)
Vanisya Humaira	Safe	Safe	Eliminated	Eliminated (Finale, Top 6)
Catherine Evelyna	Safe	Eliminated	Eliminated (Semifinals, Top 12)	
Hendrik Korwa	Safe	Eliminated	Eliminated (Semifinals, Top 12)	
Moses Bradley	Safe	Eliminated	Eliminated (Semifinals, Top 12)	
Niko Nathaniel	Safe	Eliminated	Eliminated (Semifinals, Top 12)	
Shakila Syaputri	Safe	Eliminated	Eliminated (Semifinals, Top 12)	
Wimas Shahnata	Safe	Eliminated	Eliminated (Semifinals, Top 12)	
Alisha Sadiya	Eliminated	Eliminated (Top 24)		
Billy Christopher	Eliminated	Eliminated (Top 24)		
Billy Sembiring	Eliminated	Eliminated (Top 24)		
Caecilia Laura	Eliminated	Eliminated (Top 24)		
Fire Amanda	Eliminated	Eliminated (Top 24)		
Glorivay Assa	Eliminated	Eliminated (Top 24)		
Jeni & Joni Kase	Eliminated	Eliminated (Top 24)		
Maysha Jhuan	Eliminated	Eliminated (Top 24)		
Octrin Saparuane	Eliminated	Eliminated (Top 24)		
Siti Manzilah	Eliminated	Eliminated (Top 24)		
Syarla Martiza	Eliminated	Eliminated (Top 24)		
Syifa Dinova	Eliminated	Eliminated (Top 24)		

=== Teams ===
Color key
Artist's info

- Team Kaka
- Team Agnez
- Team Marcell

Results details

- Winner
- Runner-up
- Third place
- Eliminated

Artists	Week 1 & 2 Top 24	Week 3 Semifinals	Week 4 Finale	
Artists	Week 1 & 2 Top 24	Week 3 Semifinals	Top 6	Top 3
Keva Hamzah	Public's vote	Public's vote	Advanced	Winner
Vanisya Humaira	Coach's choice	Coach's choice	Eliminated	
Moses Bradley	Coach's choice	Eliminated		
Shakila Syaputri	Public's vote	Eliminated		
Fire Amanda	Eliminated			
Jeni & Joni Kase	Eliminated			
Maysha Jhuan	Eliminated			
Octrin Saparuane	Eliminated			
Tyara Rafanaura	Coach's choice	Coach's choice	Advanced	Runner-up
Nadhia Aryasa	Public's vote	Public's vote	Eliminated	
Niko Nathaniel	Coach's choice	Eliminated		
Wimas Syahnata	Public's vote	Eliminated		
Alisha Sadiya	Eliminated			
Billy Christopher	Eliminated			
Caecilia Laura	Eliminated			
Siti Manzilah	Eliminated			
Vanessa Fritzie	Public's vote	Public's vote	Advanced	Third place
Meiska Adinda	Coach's choice	Coach's choice	Eliminated	
Catherine Evelyna	Coach's choice	Eliminated		
Hendrik Korwa	Public's vote	Eliminated		
Billy Sembiring	Eliminated			
Glorivay Assa	Eliminated			
Syarla Martiza	Eliminated			
Syifa Dinova	Eliminated			

== Artists who appeared on previous shows or season ==
- Tyara Rafanaura appeared on the fifth season of Idola Cilik and finished in third place.
- Siti Manzilah appeared on the first season of Indonesian Idol Junior.
- Reink Ferguson and Angela Nitti auditioned for the first season, but failed to turn any chairs.
- Akilah Nasywa appeared on the first season of La Academia Junior Indonesia and finished in third place.
- Erwyn Sunyoto and Nadhia Aryasa auditioned for the second season, but failed to turn any chairs.
- Catherine Evelyna appeared on the second season of Indonesian Idol Junior.
