= Anneth Delliecia =

Indonesian singer (born 2005)

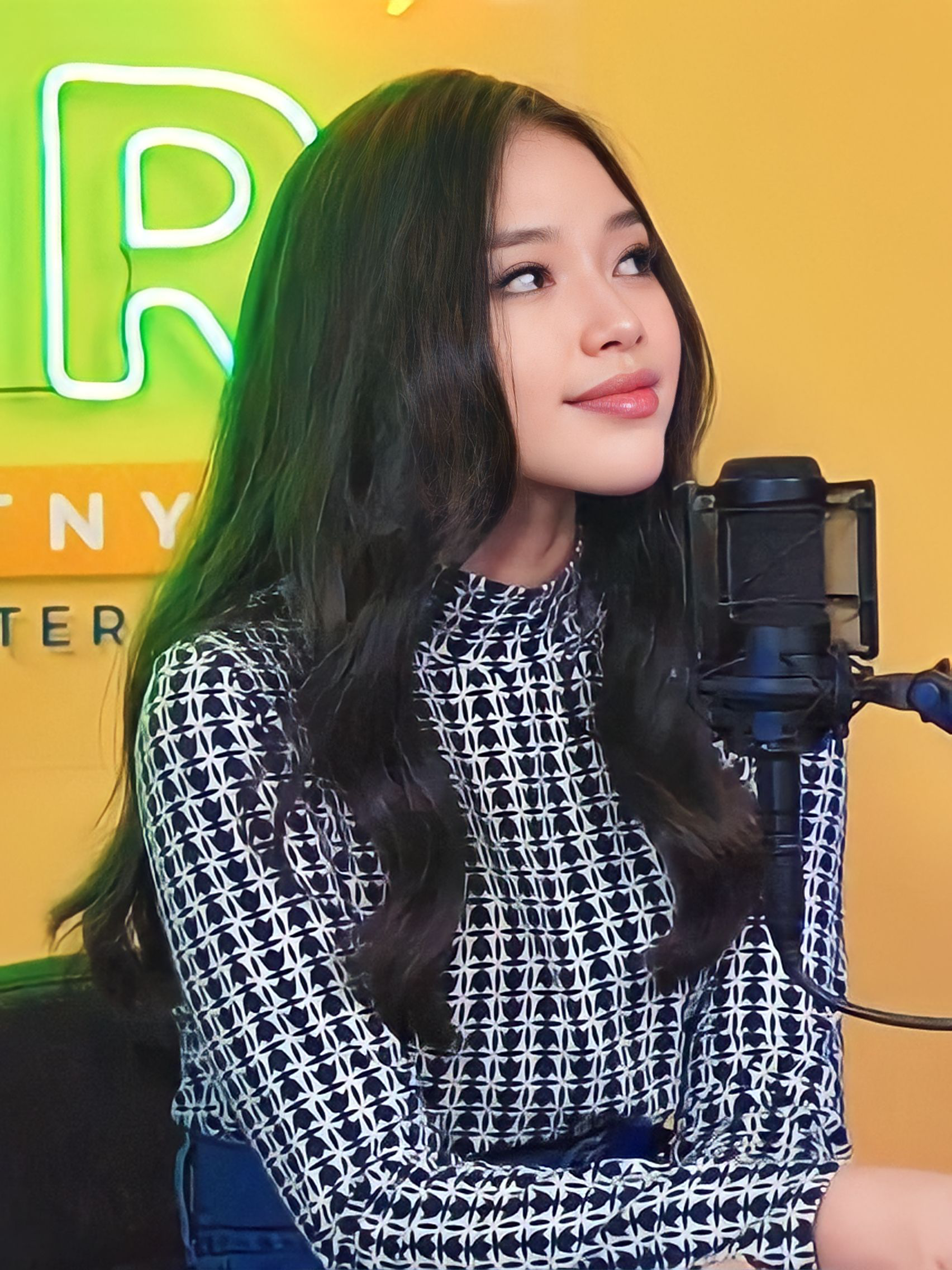
- Delliecia in 2021
- Born: Anneth Delliecia Nasution; October 18, 2005 (age 21); Balikpapan, East Kalimantan, Indonesia
- Other name: Anneth Idol Jr
- Occupations: Singer-songwriter; Celebrity; Model
- Musical career
- Genre: Pop
- Instruments: Vocal; Guitar; Piano
- Years active: 2017–present
- Labels: RANS; Hits
- Website: Anneth Delliecia on Instagram; Anneth Delliecia on X

Anneth Delliecia Nasution (born 18 October 2005) better known as Anneth Delliecia or Anneth, is an Indonesian singer-songwriter and actress. She is known as the first winner of Indonesian Idol Junior season 3, broadcast by the Indonesia television station RCTI in 2018. Her first single "Tetap Untukmu" and her own written single "Mungkin Hari Ini Esok Atau Nanti" which she created at the age of fourteen have successfully captured the attention of Indonesian music fans. The song went viral and topped the charts on various types of digital music platforms in Indonesia.

== Life and career ==
=== The Voice Kids Indonesia and Indonesian Idol Junior ===
Before joining Indonesian Idol Junior for the third season, in 2014 Delliecia had participated in Indonesian Idol Junior First Season which aired on MNC TV station when she was 9 years old. Then in 2017, Delliecia joined The Voice Kids Indonesia season 2 which aired on GTV television station joining the Agnez Mo team. In this singing competition, Delliecia made it into the grand final round. But was eliminated in the top six. In 2018, Delliecia participated in the Indonesian Idol Junior Third Season and succeeded in winning the grand final held on 14 December 2018.

==== Performances on Indonesian Idol Junior 2014 ====
Performances and result Indonesian Idol Junior 2014
Theme	Song	Original singer	Result
Audition	"Heart Attack"	Demi Lovato	Safe
Elimination I	N/A	N/A	Elimination

==== Performances on The Voice Kids Indonesia 2017 ====
Performances and result The voice Kids Indonesia 2017
Theme	Song	Original singer	Result
Blind Audition	"Rolling In The Deep"	Adele	1 chair turned Joined Team Agnez Mo
Battle Round	"If Ain't Got You" (vs. Raulla vs. Vanessa)	Alicia Keys	Saved by Coach
Sing Off	"I'd Rather Go Blind"	Etta James	Saved by Coach
Semi-final	"It's a Man's Man's Man's World"	James Brown	Saved by Coach
Final	"Listen"	Beyonce	Eliminated

==== Performances on Indonesian Idol Junior 2018 ====
Performances and result Indonesian Idol Junior 2018
Theme	Song	Originally performed by	Result
Audition	"Location"	Khalid	Safe
Audition	"Love"	Keyshia Cole	Safe
Elimination I	"Bahagia"(Group)	GAC	Safe
Elimination II	"Feeling Good"	Nina Simone	Safe
Spektacular Showcase	"Masterpiece"	Jessie J	Safe
Spectacular Show Top 10	"O Ina Ni Keke"	Anneke Grönloh	Safe
Spectacular Show Top 9	"Pelangiku"	Sherina Munaf	Safe
Spectacular Show Top 8	"Matahariku"	Agnez Mo	Safe
Spectacular Show Top 7	"Jealous"	Labrinth	Safe
Spectacular Show Top 6	"Killing Me Softly"	Roberta Flack	Safe
Spectacular Show Top 5	"I'll Never Love Again"	Lady Gaga	Safe
Road To Grand Final	"If I Were a Boy"	Beyonce	Safe
Road To Grand Final	"Shallow" (with Deven)	Lady Gaga feat. Bradley Cooper	Safe
Grand Final	"Rewrite the Stars"	Zac Efron feat. Zendaya	Safe
Grand Final	"Jangan Hilangkan Dia" (with Rossa)	Rossa	Safe
Grand Final	"Everybody Has a Dream"	Billy Joel	Winner

=== Debut Single : Tetap Untukmu and Mungkin Hari Ini Esok Atau Nanti ===
On 29 August 2019, Anneth released her first single on her first debut as a professional singer, TETAP UNTUKMU, under a label called RANS MUSIC, a label owned by Raffi Ahmad and Nagita Slavina. One year after its release, this single became the number No. 1 hit in Viral 50 Indonesia Spotify and some other digital streaming platforms. In the same year, she released a compilation album called MIMPIKU JADI NYATA. She also played a role in the same title of Web Series which was uploaded to RANS ENTERTAINMENT's YouTube channel.

In June 2020, Anneth collaborated with TNT Boys to cover a song from Ariana Grande and Justin Bieber entitled Stuck With U. This collaboration was carried out online due to the condition of the world which is facing the coronavirus. But they hope that someday they can collaborate and meet in person.

On 18 October 2020, right on her 15th birthday, her 2nd single was released. This song was written by the fourteen-year-old singer-songwriter herself. MUNGKIN HARI INI ESOK ATAU NANTI hit 80 million views in RANS MUSIC's YouTube channel within 6 months. The song became the top chart on almost all music platforms in Indonesia.

In June 2021, Joox released Believers remixes of songs from Alan Walker one of the remixes featured with Anneth.

In October 2021, Anneth was chosen to represent Indonesia in the 2021 Asia Song Festival and became the youngest performer in the event's history, aged 15.

In December 2021, Anneth was awarded as Best Asian Artist at the 2021 Mnet Asian Music Awards. She is the youngest winner of this category in the history of this event. She received this award at the age of 16.

== Discography ==
=== As lead artist ===
Year	Title	Album
2019	"Tetap Untukmu"	Mimpiku Jadi Nyata
2020	"Mungkin Hari Ini Esok Atau Nanti"	Musikini Super Hits 2 & And The Story Begins
2021	"Mungkin Hari Ini Esok Atau Nanti (Korean version)"	And The Story Begins
2021	"Bakti"	OST. Kadet 1947
2021	"Takkan Berhenti Mencintaimu"	And The Story Begins
2022	"Jera"	Melly Goeslaw Masterpieces
2022	"Warna Favorit"	And The Story Begins
2022	"Sampai Kapan (Jaga Hati Untukmu)"	And The Story Begins
2022	"Lepaskan, Relakan, Ikhlaskan"	And The Story Begins
2022	"Karenamu"	And The Story Begins
2022	"How?"	And The Story Begins
2023	"MEMAR (Meski Masih Ada Rasa)"	Single Non Album
2024	"Pandai Bicara"	Single Non Album
2024	"Sampai Bertemu Lagi"	Single Non Album
2025	"Jatuh Sejatuh-Jatuhnya"	Single Non Album
2025	"Senandung Asmara"	Single Non Album
2025	"Oh Santa"	Single Non Album
2026	"Sembunyi Dari Bumi"	Single Non Album
2026	"Jaga Hati Hati - Hati"	Single Non Album

=== As featured artist ===
Year	Title	Featuring	Album
2019	"My Heart"	Deven	Mimpiku Jadi Nyata
2019	"Menggapai Mimpi"	Marsha Zulkarnain	Mimpiku Jadi Nyata
2019	"Mimpiku Jadi Nyata"	MJN Squad	Mimpiku Jadi Nyata
2020	"Should I"	Zara Leola	Single Non Album
2021	"Believers"	Alan Walker	Believers (Remixes)
2021	"Jadi Juara"	Boy William	And The Story Begins
2021	"Sahabat Tak Akan Pergi"	Betrand Peto Putra Onsu	Single Non Album
2021	"Selalu Ada Harapan"	Misellia, Nashwa Zahira, Putri Ariani	OST. Ruangguru
2022	"Masih Belum Lupa"	Ade Govinda	And The Story Begins
2023	"Januari"	The Bakuucakar	Single Non Album
2023	"Tentang Sahabat"	Betrand Peto Putra Onsu	Single Non Album

=== Album ===
==== Solo albums ====
Title	Album details
And The Story Begins	Released: 22 April 2022; Label: Rans Music; Format: physical album & digital download

==== Compilation albums ====
Title	Album details
Mimpiku Jadi Nyata	Released: 28 August 2019; Label: Rans Music; Format: physical album & digital download
Musikini Super Hits 2	Released: 21 April 2021; Label: Jagonya Musik & Sport Indonesia; Format: physical album & digital download
Melly Goeslaw Masterpieces	Released: 1 Februari 2022; Label: Le Moesiek Revole; Format: physical album & digital download

== Filmography ==
=== Film ===
Year	Title	Role	Production
2021	Kau & Dia	Anneth	Volks Creative & Maxstream TV
2021	Kurindu Natal Keluarga: Santa Claus dari Jakarta?	Anneth	PIM Pictures & Maxstream TV
2022	Kau & Dia 2	Anneth	Volks Creative & Maxstream TV
2026	Antara Mama, Cinta & Surga: Bahasa Cinta Nommensen	Anindita	PIM Pictures
TBA	Dewa Dewi †	Dewi	

Key
†	Denotes films that have not yet been released

- TBA: To be announced

=== Web series ===
Year	Title	Role	Production
2019	Mimpiku Jadi Nyata – web series	Anneth	Rans Entertainment
2021	Bucin Story – web series	Anneth	Rans Entertainment
2021	Cinta untuk Dimas – web series	Anneth	Maxstream TV
2022	Karunia Cinta – web series	Annisa	MOP Channel

=== TV shows ===
Year	Title	Role	Production
2020	Drama Musical Christmas Concert – Doa Untuk Negeri	Gaby	RCTI Entertainment

== Video clip ==
=== Herself ===
Year	Song	Director
2019	Tetap Untukmu	Aan Story & Endik Koeswoyo
2020	Mungkin Hari Ini Esok Atau Nanti	Khairul Amri
2020	Should I	Agusriady Saputra
2021	Sahabat Tak Akan Pergi	Ruben Onsu & Jovan Arisco
2021	Bakti	Rahabi Mandra
2021	Selalu Ada Harapan	Not mentioned
2021	Takkan Berhenti Mencintaimu	Khairul Amri
2021	Masih Belum Lupa	Tb. Amri
2022	Jera	Not mentioned
2022	Sampai Kapan (Jaga Hati Untukmu)	Khairul Amri
2023	Januari	Not mentioned
2023	MEMAR (Meski Masih Ada Rasa)	Joni Astin Ariadi
2024	Pandai Bicara	Joshua Axel Limandjaja
2024	Sampai Bertemu Lagi	Joshua Axel Limandjaja
2025	Jatuh Sejatuh-Jatuhnya	Wirananda Ashari
2025	Senandung Asmara	Wirananda Ashari
2026	Jaga Hati Hati - Hati	Joshua Axel Limandjaja

=== Other singer ===
Year	Song	Singer	Director
2021	Best Friends	Joaquine Bernessa	Benedict Agung
2022	Pesta	Betrand Peto Putra Onsu	Ruben Onsu & Jovan Arisco

== Awards and nominations ==
Year	Awards	Nomination	Result
2021	JOOX Indonesia Music Awards	Indonesian Song of The Year (Mungkin Hari Ini Esok Atau Nanti)	Won
2021	Obsesi Awards	Obsessed Young Celebrity	Nominated
2021	AMI Awards		
2021	AMI Awards	Best of the Best New Artist (Mungkin Hari Ini Esok Atau Nanti)	Won
2021	AMI Awards	Best Pop Female Solo Artist (Mungkin Hari Ini Esok Atau Nanti)	Nominated
2021	AMI Awards	Best of the best Production Work (Mungkin Hari Ini Esok Atau Nanti)	Nominated
2021	AMI Awards	Best Pop songwriter (Mungkin Hari Ini Esok Atau Nanti)	Nominated
2021	Indonesian Music Awards	Social Media Artist of The Year	Nominated
2021	Indonesian Music Awards	Female Singer of The Year	Nominated
2021	Indonesian Music Awards	Song of The Year (Mungkin Hari Ini Esok Atau Nanti)	Won
2021	Mnet Asian Music Awards	Best Asian Artist Indonesia	Won

Year 2022 – Favorite Maxstream Female Talent (Kau dan Dia – 2021) – WON

Awards and achievements
Preceded by Tiara Andini	24th Annual Anugerah Musik Indonesia for Best of the Best Newcomer; 2021	Succeeded by Fabio Asher
