= The Voice Kids Indonesia season 2 =

Season of television series

The Voice Kids Indonesia
- Season 2
- Hosted by: Ananda Omesh; Ersa Mayori; Kaneishia Yusuf
- Coaches: Bebi Romeo; Agnez Mo; Tulus
- Winner: Sharla Martiza
- Winning coach: Agnez Mo
- Runner-up: Anggis Devaki

Release
- Original network: GTV
- Original release: September 7 – December 14, 2017

Season chronology
- ← Previous; Season 1 Next → Season 3

The second season of the Indonesian reality talent show The Voice Kids Indonesia premiered in 2017 on GTV (formerly Global TV). The show was confirmed on 17 March 2017 in an e-mail to a fan of the show.

== Coaches & Host ==
=== Coach ===
- Agnez Mo
- Bebi Romeo
- Muhammad Tulus

=== Host ===
- Ananda Omesh
- Ersa Mayori

== Format ==
=== Blind Auditions ===
Each contestant is sing on stage where the coach (the jury) sits back to the contestant. In blind audition, the coach only judges the contestants of the contestant's voice quality. If coach likes the contestant's voice, then coach will hit the I WANT YOU button which makes the chair rotate towards the stage. Contestants elected by more than one coach must choose a coach to accompany them to the next round.

=== Battle Rounds ===
Any contestant who has been selected by the same coach will be pitted by singing the same song. The coach then will choose a contestant between other contestants who pitted to be able to continue the next round.

=== Sing Off ===
All artists who advanced from the battle rounds will sing a song on the sing off. In each team, only four acts should be chosen to go to the semifinals.

=== Semifinals ===
Each contestant will sing 'live' in front of the coach and viewers. In the semifinals the entire Indonesian audience will determine which contestants will proceed to the next round through the voting system.

=== Grand Final ===
This round is the final round that will determine the champion of The Voice Kids Indonesia season 2.

== Teams ==
Color key:

- Winner
- Runner-up
- Third place
- Eliminated in the Finals
- Eliminated in the Semifinals
- Eliminated in the Sing-off
- Eliminated in the Battle rounds

Coaches	Top 63 artists					
Bebi Romeo						
Bebi Romeo	Kimberley Fransa	**Vitara Harahap**	Kesha Marisa	Rafa Ramaniya	Aisya Mourincia	Putri Ariani
Bebi Romeo	Sharen Laurel	Yonathan Jason	Christania Febi	Diandra Edrania	Efah Putri	Erneta Zahwa
Bebi Romeo	Jeslyn Josephine	Joanna Andrea	Josephine Antoinete	Laurencia Yuliani	Marcia Keira	Merilync Tesalonika
Bebi Romeo	Michelle Angeline	Nicole William	Ryan Chandra			
Agnez Mo						
Agnez Mo	Sharla Martiza	Anneth Delliecia	Shakira Petronela	Wasisco Lianro	Antonia Elena	Christiano Fajar
Agnez Mo	**Keisha Claudia**	Siti Hamidah	Clarissa Mulyadi	Desna Haryadi	Dita Faradibah	Friden Panggabean
Agnez Mo	Gadis Chitarabelle	Gilbert Obaroe	Joan Regina	Krisna Timothy	Michael Geraldo	Nabila Zalfa
Agnez Mo	Raulla Nakhlah	Sabita Karina	Vanessa Veronica			
Tulus						
Tulus	Anggis Devaki	Mutiara Naycilla	**Aditya Majid**	Glory Satya	Andrew Barrett	Maikhael Daniel
Tulus	Raisa Putri	Samuel Gabriel	Christoper Carlo	Ekik Sulistiawan	Florentino Louis	Jocelyn Elena
Tulus	Joyceline Eunike	Keisha Audreyna	Kezia Kaithlyn	Kirana Larasati	Muhammad Ikhlas	Nadine Arindy
Tulus	Chainia Lovera	Rachel Dwi	Stefany Raffelia			
Note: Bolded names are contestants who received the Coach Comeback and advanced to the Sing offs.

== Blind auditions ==
Color key:

✔	Coach hit his/her "I WANT YOU" button
	Artist defaulted to this coach's team
	Artist elected to join this coach's team
	Artist eliminated with no coach pressing his or her "I WANT YOU" button

=== Episode 1 (September 7) ===
Order	Artist	Age	Hometown	Song	Coaches and Artists Choices		
Order	Artist	Age	Hometown	Song	Bebi	Agnez	Tulus
1	Mutiara Naycilla	11	Malang	"Still Into You"	–	✔	✔
2	Icha Kokok	14	Surabaya	"Pelangi"	–	–	–
3	Maikhael Daniel	12	Medan	"Lean On"	✔	✔	✔
4	Marcia Keira	12	Surabaya	"Sebuah Rasa"	✔	–	–
5	Wasisco Lianro	14	Jakarta	"Back at One"	–	✔	✔
6	Regine Keiko	8	Jakarta	"Telephone"	–	–	–
7	Diandra Edrania	9	Ponorogo	"On The Night Like This"	✔	–	–
8	Safeenah Fathira	9	Padang	"Brave"	–	–	–
9	Vanessa Veronica	13	Solo	"Balada Sirkus"	–	✔	✔
10	Andrea Pramesti	12	Yogyakarta	"Time to Say Goodbye"	–	–	–
11	Jeslyn Josephine	13	Balikpapan	"Domino"	✔	–	–
12	Clarissa Mulyadi	13	Jakarta	"No"	–	✔	✔

=== Episode 2 (September 14) ===
Order	Artist	Age	Hometown	Song	Coaches and Artists Choices		
Order	Artist	Age	Hometown	Song	Bebi	Agnez	Tulus
1	Andrew Barrett	11	Denpasar	"When I Was Your Man"	–	–	✔
2	Grace Dea	14	Batam	"Runaway"	–	–	–
3	Erneta Zahwa	13	Surabaya	"Nobody's Perfect"	✔	–	–
4	Shakira Petronela	14	Jakarta	"Million Reasons"	✔	✔	✔
5	Allafta Hirzi	9	Depok	"Mimpi"	–	–	–
6	Nadine Arindy	10	Medan	"The Cure"	–	✔	✔
7	Akbar Alvin	13	Bandung	"Dia"	–	–	–
8	Anggis Devaki	14	Denpasar	"I Put a Spell on You"	✔	✔	✔
9	Sharen Laurel	14	Makassar	"Just a Friend to You"	✔	–	–
10	Amira Nadya	11	Denpasar	"Bring Me to Life"	–	–	–
11	Joan Regina	13	Padang	"The Voice Within"	–	✔	–
12	Glory Satya	14	Jakarta	"Changing"	–	✔	✔

=== Episode 3 (September 21) ===
Order	Artist	Age	Hometown	Song	Coaches and Artists Choices		
Order	Artist	Age	Hometown	Song	Bebi	Agnez	Tulus
1	Gulviana Gippy	9	Padang	"Alusi Au"	–	–	–
2	Rachel Dwi	12	Tangerang	"Impossible"	–	✔	✔
3	Christania Febi	14	Padang	“Berharap tak kembali”	✔	–	–
4	Oza Angelora	13	Palembang	"Toxic"	–	–	–
5	Gadis Chitarabelle	12	Bandung	"Scars to Your Beautiful"	–	✔	–
6	Efah Putri	14	Medan	"You Oughta Know"	✔	✔	✔
7	Michael Horas	13	Jakarta	"Ave Maria" (Note: It is unclear which version of "Ave Maria" this was, but the best-known ones are those by Bach/Gounod and by Schubert.)	–	–	–
8	Sabita Karina	14	Jakarta	"Scared to Be Lonely"	–	✔	✔
9	Ryan Chandra	14	Jakarta	"Dari Mata"	✔	–	–
10	Azzahra Mayumi	10	Tegal	"Anoman Obong"	–	–	–
11	Raulla Nakhlah	14	Jakarta	"At Last"	–	✔	–
12	Laurencia Yuliani	14	Semarang	"Shout Out to My Ex"	✔	–	–

=== Episode 4 (September 28) ===
Order	Artist	Age	Hometown	Song	Coaches and Artists Choices		
Order	Artist	Age	Hometown	Song	Bebi	Agnez	Tulus
1	Aditya Majid	12	Palembang	"Night Changes"	✔	✔	✔
2	Dita Faradibah	14	Jakarta	"Warrior"	–	✔	–
3	Tarishah Firdianti	14	Malang	"Anganku Anganmu"	–	–	–
4	Aisya Mourincia	14	Bukittinggi	"Ku Tak Bisa"	✔	–	–
5	Arga Sitorus	14	Medan	"Say You Won't Let Go"	–	–	–
6	Keisha Audreyna	14	Denpasar	"The Prayer"	–	–	✔
7	Joanna Andrea	12	Jakarta	"Little Me"	✔	–	–
8	Ariel Aprilidianto	12	Bukittinggi	"Isabella"	–	–	–
9	Kirana Larasati	10	Bandung	"Lost Boy"	✔	–	✔
10	Gilbert Obaroe	7	Jakarta	"Be-Bop-A-Lula"	–	✔	–
11	Kesha Marisa	13	Surabaya	"Treat You Better"	✔	–	–
12	Nastya Stefanovna	14	Malang	"How Far I'll Go"	–	–	–

=== Episode 5 (October 5) ===
Order	Artist	Age	Hometown	Song	Coaches and Artists Choices		
Order	Artist	Age	Hometown	Song	Bebi	Agnez	Tulus
1	Anneth Delliecia	11	Manado	"Rolling in the Deep"	–	✔	–
2	Karen Angel	12	Medan	"Angel"	–	–	–
3	Michelle Angeline	12	Jakarta	"A Thousand Years"	✔	–	–
4	Ellyn Clarissa	9	Jakarta	"Part of Your World"	–	–	–
5	Ekik Sulistiawan	14	Yogyakarta	"Berawal Dari Tatap"	–	–	✔
6	Putri Ariani	11	Yogyakarta	"Secret Love Song"	✔	–	–
7	Friden Panggabean	12	Medan	"One Call Away"	–	✔	✔
8	Farhan Maulana	12	Yogyakarta	"Symphony	–	–	–
9	Stefany Raffelia	11	Salatiga	"Do Re Mi"	✔	✔	✔
10	Christiano Fajar	10	Medan	"Still Loving You"	–	✔	–
11	Indira Maharani	8	Denpasar	"Try Everything"	–	–	–
12	Nabila Zalfa	13	Jakarta	"Side to Side"	–	✔	–

=== Episode 6 (October 12) ===
Order	Artist	Age	Hometown	Song	Coaches and Artists Choices		
Order	Artist	Age	Hometown	Song	Bebi	Agnez	Tulus
1	Samuel Gabriel	14	Depok	"Sunday Morning	–	✔	✔
2	Shalomith Christy	13	Bali	"Tua-tua Keladi"	–	–	–
3	Nicole William	14	Jakarta	"I Just Called To Say I Love You"	✔	–	–
4	Antonia Elena	13	Solo	"Sepasang Bola Mata"	✔	✔	✔
5	Desna Haryadi	13	Bengkalis	"Jadi Aku Sebentar Saja"	–	✔	–
6	Nelly Amelia	14	Tanah Laut	"Bad Romance"	–	–	–
7	Kimberley Fransa	11	Jakarta	"Habits (Stay High)"	✔	✔	✔
8	Kezia Kaithlyn	12	Jakarta	"Malibu"	✔	–	✔
9	Aura Zakkaha	13	Tanggerang	"Kenangan Terindah"	–	–	–
10	Yonathan Jason	12	Bekasi	"Feeling Good"	✔	✔	✔
11	Ivana & Leonard	14 & 11	Medan	"Karena Cinta"	–	–	–
12	Jocelyn Elena	8	Semarang	"The Climb	✔	–	✔

=== Episode 7 (October 19) ===
Order	Artist	Age	Hometown	Song	Coaches and Artists Choices		
Order	Artist	Age	Hometown	Song	Bebi	Agnez	Tulus
1	Keisha Claudia	13	Denpasar	"One Last Cry"	–	✔	–
2	Erwyn Sunyoto	14	Surabaya	"Surat Cinta Untuk Starla"	–	–	–
3	Muhammad Ikhlas	12	Bandung	"I Want You Back"	✔	✔	✔
4	Nindia Oktavanny	14	Pekanbaru	"Cinta Terbaik"	–	–	–
5	Siti Hamidah	13	Surabaya	"Send My Love (To Your New Lover)"	–	✔	–
6	Merilync Tesalonika	14	Bandung	"Fallin'"	✔	–	–
7	Michael Geraldo	10	Bandung	"Nella Fantasia"	✔	✔	–
8	Joyceline Eunike	14	Surabaya	"Castle on the Hill"	–	–	✔
9	Veva Gabriella	12	Jakarta	"Good Enough"	–	–	–
10	Josephine Antoinete	13	Pekanbaru	"Can't Help Falling In Love"	✔	✔	✔
11	Hafizh krisnawala	11	Medan	Monokrom	–	–	✔
12	Christopher Carlo	14	Medan	"Thinking Out Loud"	–	✔	✔

=== Episode 8 (October 26) ===
Order	Artist	Age	Hometown	Song	Coaches and Artists Choices		
Order	Artist	Age	Hometown	Song	Bebi	Agnez	Tulus
1	Krisna Timothy	11	Bali	"Broken Vow"	–	✔	–
2	Chainia Lovera	13	Surabaya	"Sewindu"	–	–	✔
3	Rafa Ramaniya	13	Bekasi	"Rangkaian Melati"	✔	–	–
4	Andrean Argo	11	Medan	"Cinta Satukan Kita"	–	–	–
5	Raisa Putri	10	Jakarta	"It Don't Mean a Thing"	–	✔	✔
6	Ems Martens	11	Batam	"Cups (When I'm Gone)"	–	–	–
7	Vitara Harahap	14	Medan	"Try"	✔	✔	✔
8	Nadhia Aryasa	14	Bali	"Risalah Hati"	Team full	—	—
9	Sharla Martiza^{1}	13	Jombang	"Memory"	Team full	✔	–
10	Livia Nadhira	14	Bandung	"Sign of the Times"	Team full	Team full	–
11	Florentino Louis	12	Cirebon	"Perfect"	Team full	Team full	✔

Notes

1. Despite having already joined her team, Sharla was asked by Coach Agnez Mo to sing a second track, after being told that Sharla also liked singing religious songs; she then sang "Assalamu Alayka" by Maher Zain.

== Battle Rounds ==
The Battle Rounds starts on November 2. Season 2's advisors include: Wizzy for Team Bebi, Baim for Team Agnez Mo, and Yura Yunita for Team Tulus.

Color key:

Artist won the Battle and advanced to the Sing-off
Artist lost the Battle and was originally eliminated but received the Coach Comeback and advanced to the Sing-offs
Artist lost the Battle and was eliminated

Episode	Coach	Order	Winner	Song	Losers	
Episode 9 (November 2)	Bebi Romeo	1	Rafa Ramaniya	"Akad"	Christania Febi	Nicole William
Episode 9 (November 2)	Agnez Monica	2	Christiano Fajar	"No One"	Desna Haryadi	Joan Regina
Episode 9 (November 2)	Tulus	3	Samuel Gabriel	"Hold My Hand"	Joyceline Eunike	Muhammad Ikhlas
Episode 9 (November 2)	Bebi Romeo	4	Aisya Mourincia	"Shining Star"	Joanna Andrea	Laurencia Yuliani
Episode 9 (November 2)	Agnez Monica	5	Wasisco Lianro	"Hate That I Love You"	Friden Panggabean	Keisha Claudia
Episode 9 (November 2)	Tulus	6	Raisa Putri	"Buktikan"	Chainia Lovera	Nadine Arindy
Episode 9 (November 2)	Bebi Romeo	7	Yonathan Jason	"Dream On"	Efah Putri	Erneta Zahwa
Episode 10 (November 9)	Agnez Monica	1	Siti Hamidah	"Stay"	Clarissa Mulyadi	Nabila Zalfa
Episode 10 (November 9)	Bebi Romeo	2	Sharen Laurel	"I Remember"	Diandra Edrania	Ryan Chandra
Episode 10 (November 9)	Tulus	3	Naycilla Mutiara	"You'll Be In My Heart"	Jocelyn Elena	Rachel Dwi
Episode 10 (November 9)	Agnez Monica	4	Anneth Delliecia	"If I Ain't Got You"	Raulla Nakhah	Vanessia Veronica
Episode 10 (November 9)	Tulus	5	Glory Satya	"Rather Be"	Christopher Carlo	Keisha Audreyna
Episode 10 (November 9)	Bebi Romeo	6	Kimberley Fransa	"Elastic Heart"	Merilync Tesalonika	Vitara Harahap
Episode 10 (November 9)	Tulus	7	Andrew Barett	"Love Never Felt So Good"	Kirana Larasati	Stefany Raffelia
Episode 11 (November 16)	Agnez Monica	1	Shakira Petronela	"Wrecking Ball"	Dita Faradibah	Gilbert Obaroe
Episode 11 (November 16)	Bebi Romeo	2	Kesha Marisa	"Attention"	Jeslyn Josephine	Michelle Angeline
Episode 11 (November 16)	Tulus	3	Anggis Devaki	"Zamrud Khatilistiwa"	Aditya Majid	Kezia Kaithlyn
Episode 11 (November 16)	Agnez Monica	4	Sharla Martiza	"Desert Rose"	Gadis Chitarabelle	Sabita Karina
Episode 11 (November 16)	Bebi Romeo	5	Putri Ariani	"To Where You Are"	Josephine Antoinette	Marcia Keira
Episode 11 (November 16)	Tulus	6	Maikhael Daniel	"Setahun Kemarin"	Ekik Sulistiawan	Florentino Louis
Episode 11 (November 16)	Agnez Monica	7	Antonia Elena	"My Immortal"	Krisna Timothy	Michael Geraldo

== Sing Off ==
Three previously eliminated artists were chosen by the coaches to come back as coach's save for the Sing Offs. They were Vitara Harahap (by Bebi), Keisha Claudia (by Agnez Mo), and Aditya Majid (by Tulus).

Color key:

Artist was selected by his/her coach and advanced to the Semifinals
Artist was eliminated

Episode	Coach	Order	Artist	Song	Result
Episode 12 (November 23)	Bebi Romeo	1	Aisya Mourincia	"Yang Terlupakan"	Eliminated
Episode 12 (November 23)	Bebi Romeo	2	Putri Ariani	"Somebody to Love"	Eliminated
Episode 12 (November 23)	Bebi Romeo	3	Kimberley Fransa	"Back to You"	Advanced
Episode 12 (November 23)	Bebi Romeo	4	Kesha Marisa	"All I Want"	Advanced
Episode 12 (November 23)	Agnez Monica	5	Christiano Fajar	"Always"	Eliminated
Episode 12 (November 23)	Agnez Monica	6	Keisha Claudia	"Moody's Mood for Love"	Eliminated
Episode 12 (November 23)	Agnez Monica	7	Wasisco Lianro	"Kaulah Segalanya"	Advanced
Episode 12 (November 23)	Agnez Monica	8	Anneth Delliecia	"I'd Rather Go Blind"	Advanced
Episode 12 (November 23)	Tulus	9	Mutiara Naycilla	"I Have Nothing"	Advanced
Episode 12 (November 23)	Tulus	10	Samuel Gabriel	"Tak Pernah Padam"	Eliminated
Episode 12 (November 23)	Tulus	11	Anggis Devaki	"Always on My Mind"	Advanced
Episode 12 (November 23)	Tulus	12	Andrew Barrett	"Can't Stop the Feeling!"	Eliminated
Episode 13 (November 30)	Tulus	1	Maikhael Daniel	"Cinta kan Membawamu Kembali"	Eliminated
Episode 13 (November 30)	Tulus	2	Glory Satya	"Issues"	Advanced
Episode 13 (November 30)	Tulus	3	Aditya Majid	"Kun Anta"	Advanced
Episode 13 (November 30)	Tulus	4	Raisa Putri	"Lullaby of Broadway"	Eliminated
Episode 13 (November 30)	Agnez Monica	5	Antonia Elena	"Hallelujah"	Eliminated
Episode 13 (November 30)	Agnez Monica	6	Shakira Petronela	"Skyscraper"	Advanced
Episode 13 (November 30)	Agnez Monica	7	Sharla Martiza	"New Rules"	Advanced
Episode 13 (November 30)	Agnez Monica	8	Siti Hamidah	"Dangerous Woman"	Eliminated
Episode 13 (November 30)	Bebi Romeo	9	Vitara Harahap	"Too Good at Goodbyes"	Advanced
Episode 13 (November 30)	Bebi Romeo	10	Sharen Laurel	"Trouble Is a Friend"	Eliminated
Episode 13 (November 30)	Bebi Romeo	11	Rafa Ramaniya	"Havana"	Advanced
Episode 13 (November 30)	Bebi Romeo	12	Yonathan Jason	"Cry Me a River"	Eliminated

== Live Shows ==
Color key:

Artist was saved by the Public's votes
Artist was saved by the Coach's choices
Artist was eliminated

=== Week 1 : Semifinals (December 7) ===
With the elimination of Aditya Majid and Wasisco Lianro, there is no more boy contestants remained in the competition, thus making this season the first to have all-girl final.

Episode	Coach	Order	Artist	Song	Result
Episode 14 (December 7)	Tulus	1	Aditya Majid	"Laksmana Raja di Laut"	Eliminated
Episode 14 (December 7)	Tulus	2	Anggis Devaki	"Pergilah Kasih"	Public's vote
Episode 14 (December 7)	Tulus	3	Mutiara Naycilla	"Don't You Worry 'Bout a Thing"	Tulus' choice
Episode 14 (December 7)	Tulus	4	Glory Satya	"Hyperballad"	Eliminated
Episode 14 (December 7)	Bebi Romeo	5	Kimberley Fransa	"Black Hole Sun"	Public's vote
Episode 14 (December 7)	Bebi Romeo	6	Vitara Harahap	"Rise Up"	Bebi's choice
Episode 14 (December 7)	Bebi Romeo	7	Rafa Ramaniya	"Di Wajahmu Kulihat Bulan"	Eliminated
Episode 14 (December 7)	Bebi Romeo	8	Kesha Marisa	"Cancer"	Eliminated
Episode 14 (December 7)	Agnez Monica	9	Wasisco Lianro	"Mirrors"	Eliminated
Episode 14 (December 7)	Agnez Monica	10	Sharla Martiza	"Hide & Seek"	Public's vote
Episode 14 (December 7)	Agnez Monica	11	Anneth Delliecia	"It's a Man's Man's Man's World"	Agnez's choice
Episode 14 (December 7)	Agnez Monica	12	Shakira Petronela	"What About Us"	Eliminated

Non-competition performances
Order	Performer	Song
14.1	All Finalist	"Don't You Worry Child"
14.2	Naura & Angga Yunanda	"Kau Bisa"

=== Week 2 : Finals (December 14) ===
Grand Final

All three coaches had an artist advance to the finale top 3 for the first time, thus making season 2 the first in The Voice Kids Indonesia history.

Episode	Coach	Order	Artist	Song	Result
Episode 15 (December 14)	Agnez Monica	1	Anneth Delliecia	"Listen"	Eliminated
Episode 15 (December 14)	Agnez Monica	2	Sharla Martiza	"Nirmala"	Advanced
Episode 15 (December 14)	Bebi Romeo	3	Kimberley Fransa	"Beat It"	Advanced
Episode 15 (December 14)	Bebi Romeo	4	Vitara Harahap	"If You Go Away"	Eliminated
Episode 15 (December 14)	Tulus	5	Mutiara Naycilla	"All By Myself"	Eliminated
Episode 15 (December 14)	Tulus	6	Anggis Devaki	"Through the Fire"	Advanced

Finale

Episode	Coach	Order	Artist	Song	Result
Episode 15 (December 14)	Tulus	1	Anggis Devaki	"Lembayung Bali"	Runner-up
Episode 15 (December 14)	Agnez Monica	2	Sharla Martiza	"Beautiful Liar"	Winner
Episode 15 (December 14)	Bebi Romeo	3	Kimberley Fransa	"Feel It Still"	Third place

Non-competition performances
Order	Performer	Song
15.1	Tulus	"Tukar Jiwa"
15.2	Bebi Romeo	"Oh! Darling"
15.3	Agnez Mo	"Damn I Love You"
15.4	Agnez Mo and her team (Anneth Delliecia and Sharla Martiza)	"Things Well Get Better"
15.5	Bebi Romeo and his team (Kimberley Fransa and Vitara Harahap)	"Bawalah Cintaku"
15.6	Tulus and his team (Anggis Devaki and Mutiara Naycilla)	"Jangan Cintai Aku Apa Adanya"
15.7	Christopher Edgar	"Too Much to Ask"

== Elimination Chart ==
=== Overall ===
Color key
Artist's info

- Team Bebi
- Team Agnez Mo
- Team Tulus

Result details

- Winner
- Runner-up
- Third Place
- Saved by his/her coach
- Saved by public
- Eliminated

Live show results per week
Artists	Semifinals	Finals	
Artists	Semifinals	Top 6	Top 3
Sharla Martiza	Safe	Safe	Winner
Anggis Devaki	Safe	Safe	Runner-up
Kimberley Fransa	Safe	Safe	3rd place
Anneth Delliecia	Safe	Eliminated	Eliminated (Grand Final)
Mutiara Naycilla	Safe	Eliminated	Eliminated (Grand Final)
Vitara Harahap	Safe	Eliminated	Eliminated (Grand Final)
Aditya Majid	Eliminated	Eliminated (Semifinal)	
Glory Satya	Eliminated	Eliminated (Semifinal)	
Kesha Marisa	Eliminated	Eliminated (Semifinal)	
Rafa Ramaniya	Eliminated	Eliminated (Semifinal)	
Shakira Petronela	Eliminated	Eliminated (Semifinal)	
Wasisco Lianro	Eliminated	Eliminated (Semifinal)	

=== Team ===
Color key
Artist's info

- Team Bebi
- Team Agnez Mo
- Team Tulus

Result details

- Winner
- Runner-up
- Third place
- Eliminated

Live show results per week
Artists	Semifinals	Finals	
Artists	Semifinals	Top 6	Top 3
Kimberley Fransa	Public's vote	Advanced	Third place
Vitara Harahap	Coach's choice	Eliminated	
Kesha Marisa	Eliminated		
Rafa Ramaniya	Eliminated		
Sharla Martiza	Public's vote	Advanced	Winner
Anneth Delliecia	Coach's choice	Eliminated	
Shakira Petronela	Eliminated		
Wasisco Lianro	Eliminated		
Anggis Devaki	Public's vote	Advanced	Runner-up
Mutiara Naycilla	Coach's choice	Eliminated	
Aditya Majid	Eliminated		
Glory Satya	Eliminated		

== Artists who appeared on previous shows or season ==
- Mutiara Naycilla and Vitara Harahap were on the first season of Indonesian Idol Junior in 2014, and were eliminated in the Top 11 and the Top 3 rounds, respectively.
- Putri Ariani won the second season of Indonesia's Got Talent in 2014.
- Florentino Louis, Merilync Tesalonika, Michelle Angeline, Rachel Dwi, Vanessa Veronica, and Yonathan Jason all auditioned for the first season, but all of them failed to make the coaches turn for them.
- Joyceline Eunike, Kimberley Fransa, and Raulla Nakhlah were on the second season of Indonesian Idol Junior in 2016, and were eliminated in the elimination round.
