= Rising Star (franchise) =

Reality television music competition format

- Created by: Asaf Spector Shenkar; Yoav Tzafir; Avi Nir
- Original work: HaKokhav HaBa
- Owner: Keshet Media Group
- Years: 2013–present

Films and television
- Television series: Rising Star (independent international versions, see below)

Miscellaneous
- Genre: Reality; Singing competition
- First aired: 17 September 2013; 13 years ago

Official website
- Production website

Rising Star is an international singing reality competition television franchise based on the Israeli singing reality competition television series HaKokhav HaBa (Hebrew: הכוכב הבא, meaning "The Next Star"), which is produced by Keshet Broadcasting Ltd. The program format lets viewers vote for contestants via mobile apps. It has become a rival to the Idols franchise, The Voice and The X Factor.

== Format ==
In contrast to other singing competition TV shows which feature a cast of celebrity judges, Rising Star features a cast of celebrity experts and considers the viewers at home the judges. During each performance, the audience at home is able to decide in real time whether or not a contestant is sent through to the next round by using a mobile voting app.

While the viewers at home are considered the "judges", the expert panelists also may influence the vote but with continuously decreasing percentage votes over the total public vote and not exceeding 7% of the total voting power.

=== Auditions ===
Acts are not pre-announced, and names are called randomly from their waiting room where they are assembled. Only a limited number of the contestants in waiting get the chance of actually performing during the show that day. As a reportage of the randomly announced performer is shown, viewers are invited to register for voting for that specific act. As the candidate proceeds to the stage, the host has a very brief conversation with him/her. With a countdown of three seconds, the candidate has to start performing behind a screen called "The Wall". With the start of performance, the voting kicks in. Registered voters have the option of voting just "yes" or "no". Non-votes are also considered "no" votes. If a panelist (excluding the host) votes "yes", another 7% is added to the tally of the contestant. The contestants also see random photos of voters in their favour. Faces of panelists voting "yes" will also be shown in much larger frames. Once the contestant reaches 70% of "Yes" votes, the wall is raised and the contestant goes to the next round of the competition.

=== Duels ===
Contestants who make it through the auditions are paired by the experts to face off in a duel. The first contestant to sing, chosen by a coin toss before the show, sings with the wall up and sets the benchmark for the second contestant. The second contestant sings with the wall down. If the second contestant betters the first contestant's vote total, the wall rises and the second contestant is through to the next round while the first contestant is eliminated; if the second contestant fails to raise the wall, the second contestant is eliminated and the first contestant is through.

=== Eliminations and final ===
After the duel rounds, half the contestants perform with the wall up, after which the contestant with the lowest vote total is placed in the "hot seat". The subsequent contestants perform with the wall down, and they have to better the vote total of the contestant in the hot seat to raise the wall. If they succeed in doing so, the contestant in the "hot seat" is eliminated, the contestant with the next lowest vote total is placed in the hot seat, and the performing contestant is provisionally qualified; otherwise, the performing contestant is eliminated if they fail to raise the wall. This continues until the remaining contestants with the lowest number of votes are eliminated. In this stage, each panelist's vote counts as 5%.

The quarterfinals and semifinals follow the same format, except with a lower weightage of the panelists' votes of 3% in quarterfinals and 1% in the semifinals as the number of contestants goes down.

During the finale, contestants are paired into a duel. The first contestant sings with the wall up and sets the "benchmark" for the second contestant. The second contestant sings with the wall down. If the second contestant gets the higher percentage of votes, then the wall rises and the second contestant moves on to the next round of duels. However, if the second contestant's percentage is lower than the first contestant's, the wall stays down and the contestant is eliminated. In the second round, the two contestants that moved on will duel against each other with their second song. The same process applies for this round, except the running vote total is not revealed, and both contestants sing with the wall up. The contestant with the higher vote percentage becomes the winner of Rising Star.

Finally, each coach will have his/her best contestant left standing to compete in the finals, singing an original song. From these four, one will be named "Rising Star"—and will receive the grand prize of a recording contract. Warner Music Group is the general record company associated and affiliated with the Rising Star format in most countries.

== Rising Star around the world ==
After the success of the Israeli series in 2013, many television stations throughout the world bought the rights and started broadcasting similar series. Most notable of such stations were the American television network ABC which began airing its first series in June 2014 live from Los Angeles in the Eastern, Central, & Mountain time zones. The US edition was also carried in Canada, with advertising simultaneous substitution and voting access on CTV. The American version lasted a full 10-episode season before getting canceled due to low viewership.

Another major broadcaster RTL Television launched a German language version in Germany. After the show experienced low ratings during its first few episodes, RTL Television cancelled Rising Star Germany and reduced the season's length to 7 episodes; the winner was determined through a special finale event rather than a full season.

In the United Kingdom, ITV bought the rights, but cancelled its scheduled launch due to lower-than-expected viewership in similar launches in the United States and Germany.

French television channel M6 launched its own version in September 2014, keeping the title Rising Star. Following a highly rated first episode on 25 September 2014, the show's ratings declined drastically; this caused the show to be cancelled midway through its first and only season (the final episode aired two weeks earlier than scheduled). Italian broadcaster Canale 5 bought the rights for its version of Rising Star, which was cancelled during development for unknown reasons.

Other broadcasters that adapted the series include Argentinian Telefe as Elegidos (La música en tus manos), Brazilian Rede Globo as SuperStar, Chinese CCTV-3, Greek ANT1 as Rising Star, Hungarian TV2 as Rising Star, Indonesian RCTI and MNCTV as Rising Star Indonesia and Rising Star Dangdut respectively, Portuguese TVI as Rising Star: A próxima estrela, Russia-1 as Артист (Artist), and Turkish broadcaster TV8 as Yükselen Yıldız. Of these versions, only the Brazilian and Indonesian versions aired for more than two seasons; the Brazilian version was canceled after three seasons because of declining viewership.

== International versions ==
Franchise with a currently airing season
Franchise awaiting confirmation
Franchise with an unknown status
Franchise with an upcoming season
Franchise no longer in production
Franchise that was cancelled during development

Country/Region	Local title	Network(s)	App Used for Voting	Winner(s)	Presenter(s)	Experts
Arab World	Rising Star Mazika 3altayer	Yas TV (season 1–3); RTC 1 (season 4); Abu Dhabi TV (season 5–6); MTV (season 6–7); ART (season 7)	ADtv; Ain	Season 1, 2017–18: Ali Mesbah; Season 2, 2018: Rima Abu Hadi; Season 3, 2018: Hanine Bousaïd; Season 4, 2018–19: Omar Al-Adwan; Season 5, 2019–20: Abdallah Al-Salem; Season 6, 2021–22: Ashraf Al-Omari; Season 7, 2025: TBA	Huda Hamdan (1-3); Rashid Al-Nasser (4); Maysa Al-Sharif (4–6); Dania El Khatib (7)	Abdallah Zaman (1–5); Shahd Barmada (1-4); Mohammed Ali Mansour (1–5); Qamar (4); Nouamane Belaiachi (5–6); Amani Ali (6); Mostafa Saleh (6); Ali Mesbah (7); Salim Assaf (7); Souhila ben Lachheb (7)
Argentina	Elegidos, la música en tus manos	Telefe; Website		Season 1, 2015: Matías Carrica; Season 2, 2015: Jorge Vazquez	Marley	Miranda!; El Puma Rodríguez; Soledad Pastorutti; Axel
Brazil	SuperStar	TV Globo; Website		Season 1, 2014: Malta; Season 2, 2015: Lucas & Orelha; Season 3, 2016: Fulô de Mandacaru	Fernanda Lima (1-3); Rafa Brites (2-3); André Marques (1-2); Fernanda Paes Leme (1)	Daniela Mercury (3); Paulo Ricardo (2-3); Sandy (2-3); Ivete Sangalo (1); Fábio Jr. (1); Dinho Ouro Preto (1); Thiaguinho (2)
China	中国正在听	CCTV-3		Season 1, 2014: Zhao Yuchen	Li Jiaming	Harlem Yu; Jolin Tsai; Li Yuchun; Li Jian
France	Rising Star	M6; Website		Season 1, 2014: Corentin Grevost	Faustine Bollaert; Guillaume Pley	David Hallyday; Cathy Guetta; Cali; Morgan Serrano
Germany	Rising Star	RTL; Website		Season 1, 2014: Unknown Passenger	Rainer Jilg	Sasha; Gentleman; Joy Denalane
Greece	Rising Star	ANT1; Website		Season 1, 2016–17: Giannis Xanthopoulos	Giorgos Liagkas; Kalomira (Backstage)	Antonis Remos; Despina Vandi; Kostas Makedonas; Christos Mastoras
Hungary	Rising Star	TV2; Website	TV2 Live	Season 1, 2014–15: Palmira Várhegyi Lucas	Nóra Ördög; Péter Majoros	Mihály Mező; Pál Feke; Anna Pásztor; Miklós Gábor Kerényi
India	Rising Star	Colors	Voot	Season 1, 2017: Bannet Dosanjh; Season 2, 2018: Hemant Brijwashi; Season 3, 2019: Aftab Singh (first child Winner); Season 4, TBA: Awaiting confirmation	Meiyang Chang (1); Raghav Juyal (1); Ravi Dubey (2); Aditya Narayan (3)	Shankar Mahadevan; Diljit Dosanjh; Monali Thakur (1, 2); Neeti Mohan (3)
Indonesia	Rising Star Indonesia	RCTI; Website		Season 1, 2014: Indah Nevertari; Season 2, 2016–17: Andmesh Kamaleng; Season 3, 2018–19: Elvan Saragih	Boy William (1–3); Ovi Dian (co-host) (1); Kimmy Jayanti (co-host) (1); Nirina Zubir (co-host) (2); Robby Purba (2–3); Sere Kalina (3)	Anang Hermansyah (1–2); Judika (1–3); Rossa (1–3); Bebi Romeo (1); Millane Fernandez (1); Lilo (1); Andien (1); Armand Maulana (2); Ariel "Noah" (2–3); Yovie Widianto (3)
Indonesia	Rising Star Dangdut	MNCTV	RCTI+	Season 1, 2021: Rezki Ramdani; Season 2, 2022: Zainul Basyar	Indra Herlambang (1–2); Astrid Tiar (1–2)	Ivan Gunawan (1–2); Ayu Ting Ting (1–2); Iyeth Bustami (1–2); Pasha "Ungu" (1–2); Danang Pradana Dieva (1–2); Judika (1); Nella Kharisma (1–2); Denny Caknan (1); Inul Daratista (2); Zaskia Gotik (2); Iis Dahlia (2); Elvy Sukaesih (2); Erie Suzan (2)
Israel (original format)	HaKokhav HaBa הכוכב הבא / הכוכב הבא לאירוויזיון	Current; Keshet 12 (5–11); Former; Channel 2 (1–4); Website		Season 1, 2013: Evyatar Korkus; Season 2, 2014–15: Nadav Guedj; Season 3, 2015–16: Hovi Star; Season 4, 2016-17: Imri Ziv; Season 5, 2017–18: Netta Barzilai; Season 6, 2018–19: Kobi Marimi; Season 7, 2019–20: Eden Alene; Season 8, 2021: Tamir Grinberg; Season 9, 2022: Eliav Zohar; Season 10, 2023–24: Eden Golan; Season 11, 2024–25: Yuval Raphael; Season 12, 2025–26: Noam Bettan	Current; Assi Azar; Rotem Sela (2-11); Former; Esti Ginzburg (1)	Current; Keren Peles (2-12); Asaf Amdurski (4-12); Shiri Maimon (6-12); Itay Levi (7-12); Eden Hason (10-12); Former; Ran Danker (9-11); Ninet Tayeb (8-9); Static & Ben-El Tavori (4-8); Harel Skaat (2-6); Asaf Atedgi (2-3); Muki (second half - series one) (1-3); Rita (1); Tzvika Hadar (1); Rani Rahav (1); Eyal Golan (first half - series one) (1)
Portugal	Rising Star: A próxima estrela	TVI; Website		Season 1, 2014: Bruno Correia	Leonor Poeiras; Pedro Teixeira	Pedro Ribeiro; Cuca Roseta; Rita Guerra; Carlão
Russia	Артист (Artist)	Rossiya 1 Website		Season 1, 2014: Suzanna Abdulla	Olga Shelest; Vladimir Yaglych	Lolita Milyavskaya; Eugene Margulis; Nikolay Fomenko; Julia Savicheva
Sri Lanka	Hiru Star	Hiru TV	Hiru Star	Season 1, 2018–19: Mangala Denex; Season 2, 2019–21: Udara Kaushalya; Season 3, 2021–22: Amisha Minol; Season 4, 2023–24: Chamod Kavishka; Season 5, 2025–26: Current season	Current; Saranga Disasekara (second half - 2)(3,4 and 5); Former; Uddika Premarathna (1)(First half - 2)	Current; Chandralekha Perera; Amal Perera (second half - 2)(3,4 and 5); Ruwan Hettiarachchi (4 and 5); Former; Nirosha Virajini (1-4); Shihan Mihiranga Bennet (1–3); Billy Fernando (first half - 1–2); Rookantha Goonatillake (second half - 1)
Turkey	Yükselen Yıldız	TV8		Season 1, 2015: Ferit Özkan Başeğmez; Season 2, 2016: Ozancan Demir	Öykü Serter	Mustafa Sandal (1-2); Demet Akalın (1); Gülben Ergen (1); Fuat Güner (1); Emina Jahović (2); İrem Derici (2); Yılmaz Morgül (2)
United Kingdom	Rising Star	ITV		Season 1, 2015: Cancelled	—N/a	—N/a
United States	Rising Star	ABC; Website; CTV (simulcast)		Season 1, 2014: Jesse Kinch	Josh Groban	Brad Paisley; Kesha; Ludacris
