= Rising Star Indonesia =

Indonesian singing competition

- Genre: Reality show
- Created by: Keshet Media Group
- Developed by: Screenz Cross Media LTD
- Presented by: Boy William; Ovi Dian; Kimmy Jayanti; Nirina Zubir; Robby Purba; Indra Herlambang; Astrid Tiar
- Judges: Bebi Romeo; Millane Fernandez; Lilo; Andien; Judika; Rossa; Ariel "Noah"; Anang Hermansyah; Armand Maulana; Yovie Widianto; Ivan Gunawan; Ayu Ting Ting; Iyeth Bustami; Pasha "Ungu"; Danang Pradana Dieva; Anji; Nella Kharisma; Denny Caknan; Hetty Koes Endang; Judika
- Country of origin: Indonesia
- No. of seasons: 3 (original); 2 (dangdut)
- No. of episodes: 52

Production
- Executive producer: Fabian Dharmawan
- Producers: Rachmad Welly; Sylvia Pradhita; Rahmat Permadi
- Running time: 120–180 minutes (commercials included)
- Production company: Keshet Broadcasting

Original release
- Network: RCTI
- Release: 28 August 2014 – 8 April 2019

Related
- Rising Star

Rising Star Indonesia is a reality singing competition of Israeli origin that began airing on RCTI on 28 August 2014. This program is based on the Israeli singing competition, HaKokhav HaBa and produced by Israel-based, Keshet Media, Rising Star. The program's format lets viewers vote for contestants via mobile apps.

This format adds to the list of RCTI singing competitions along with Indonesian Idol and X Factor Indonesia. Fabian Dharmawan, the showrunner of said programs, was appointed by the network to produce the show.

The first season of Rising Star Indonesia began airing on 28 August 2014 after auditions in five cities. The finale was held on December 19, 2014. This season's panel of judges (which are referred to as "experts") consisted of Rossa, Judika, Ahmad Dhani, and Bebi Romeo. Millane Fernandez, Lilo and Andien resigned as the former main experts. The season was won by Indah Nevertari.

The second season began airing on 12 December 2016. The season was won by Andmesh Kamaleng after receiving 80% votes in his final performance. The season featured contestants competing through a series of performances before the final.

The third season began airing on 17 December 2018 with Judika, Rossa, and Ariel "Noah" returning as experts from previous season, alongside new expert Yovie Widianto. The season was won by Elvan Saragih.

In March 2021, it was announced that Rising Star Indonesia would air a dangdut version that would be broadcast on MNCTV as Rising Star Indonesia Dangdut. The first season was won by Rezki Ramdani after receiving 85% votes in her final performance. The second season was won by Zainul Basyar after receiving 74% votes in his final performance.

== List of seasons, experts, hosts and winners ==
| Year | Season | Experts | Host | Co-host | Winner | Runner-up |
|---|---|---|---|---|---|---|
| 2014 | Season 1 | Bebi Romeo; Millane Fernandez (until the top 11); Lilo (audition 1); Andien (audition 1 & 2); Anang Hermansyah (audition 2 & 8, final duel 2); Judika (audition 3–8, duel 3 & 4, final duel 1, top 10-8, top 6, final); Ahmad Dhani (audition 3–7, duel 1, until the final); Dewi Sandra (duel 1); Sammy Simorangkir (duel 2); Kevin Aprilio (top 14 & 7); Shanty (top 12); Syahrini (top 11); Momo "Geisha" (top 10); Sophia Latjuba (top 9); Melly Goeslaw (top 8); Ayu Ting Ting (top 7 & 6); Afgan (top 5); Rossa (top 5 & final) | Boy William | Ovi Dian; Kimmy Jayanti | Indah Nevertari | Hanin Dhiya |
| 2016–17 | Season 2 | Anang Hermansyah: Judika; Ariel "Noah"; Rossa; Armand Maulana (audition 2–4, live test, live audition 1–6, duels 1–2, top 12, top 9–8, top 5); Yuni Shara (audition 6 & top 12); Ari Lasso (top 5) | Boy William | Nirina Zubir; Robby Purba | Andmesh Kamaleng | Fauziah Khalida |

== Seasons timeline ==
| Main experts | | Hosts | |
| Season 1 (2014) | Season 2 (2016–17) | Season 1 (2014) | Season 2 (2016–17) |
|---|---|---|---|
| Bebi Romeo | | Boy William | |
| Millane Fernandez (Note: Resigned as the main expert until the top 11 because she wants to promote her newest album and shifted randomly with the guest expert every week.) | | Ovi Dian | |
| Lilo (Note: Resigned as the main expert after the audition 1 and shifted randomly with the guest expert every week.) | | Kimmy Jayanti | |
| Andien (Note: Resigned as the main expert until the audition 2 and shifted randomly with the guest expert every week.) | | | Nirina Zubir |
| Anang Hermansyah (Note: Judika's, Rossa's, Anang's, Ariel's and Armand's stint(s) are shifted randomly, depending on who is able to present at a particular week.) (Note: All three of them had been a guest expert on the first season and therefore they counted as the experts from the first season.) | | | Robby Purba |
| Judika | | | |
| Rossa | | | |
| | Ariel "Noah" | | |
| | Armand Maulana | | |

== Awards and nominations ==
| Year | Award | Category | Result |
|---|---|---|---|
| 2015 | Panasonic Gobel Awards | Program Talent Show & Reality Show | Won |
