= Rising Star Indonesia season 2 =

Rising Star Indonesia
- Season 2
- Hosted by: Boy William; Nirina Zubir; Robby Purba
- Judges: Judika; Anang Hermansyah; Ariel "Noah"; Rossa; Armand Maulana (audition 2–4, live test, live audition 1–6, duels 1–2, top 12, top 9–8, top 5); Yuni Shara (audition 6 & top 12); Ari Lasso (top 5)
- Winner: Andmesh Kamaleng
- Runner-up: Fauziah Khalida

Release
- Original network: RCTI
- Original release: 12 December 2016 – 27 March 2017

Season chronology
- Next → Season 3

The second season of Rising Star Indonesia an Indonesian reality singing television competition aired on RCTI. Judika, Anang Hermansyah, Ariel "Noah" and Rossa are appointed as the experts. Boy William, Nirina Zubir and Robby Purba are appointed as hosts. The winner of which receives a 1 billion rupiahs recording contract with Hits Record. The second season aired on 12 December 2016 and is produced by RCTI in-house production and led by Fabian Dharmawan. This season, the competition was won by Andmesh Kamaleng after received 80 percent in the final round.

== Auditions ==
Cities where the auditions were held.

The open call auditions were held in the following locations:

Date	Audition venue	Location
September 17, 2016	Sahid Jaya Hotel	Yogyakarta
September 24, 2016	Medan International Convention Center	Medan
September 28, 2016	Balai Prajurit	Surabaya
October 4, 2016	Sasana Budaya Ganesha	Bandung
October 8–9, 2016	MNC Studios	Jakarta

== Room audition ==
=== Audition 1 (December 12) ===
Order	Contestant	Identity	Song	Expert Choices			
Order	Contestant	Identity	Song	Judika	Rossa	Ariel "Noah"	Anang Hermansyah
1	Bening Ayu	19, Yogyakarta, University Student	"Ku Ingin Kau Mati Saja"	Y	Y	Y	Y
2	Ananda Iman Abraham	16, Bekasi, Student	"Ruin"	Y	Y	Y	Y
3	Afifudin	21, Tegal, Employeer	"Unkiss Me"	N	N	N	N
4	Hendra Nanda	17, Aceh, University Student	"I Will Never Let You Down"	N	Y	N	Y
5	Hardi Kornelius Tobing	32, Bandung, Cafe Singer	"Pergilah Kasih"	Y	Y	Y	Y
6	Aby Winehouse	27, Jakarta, Make Up Artist	"Super Duper Love (Are You Diggin' on Me)"	N	N	Y	N
7	RR Ayu Rieke Marsella Putri	19, Lamongan, University Student	"Mimpi"	Y	Y	Y	Y
8	Satrio Pambudi	21, Medan, University Student	"I Live My Life for You"	N	N	N	N
9	Theresia Aprilianti Tambunan	25, Medan, Cafe Singer	"Run"	Y	Y	Y	Y
10	Bagas Yoga	19, Surabaya, Student	"Team"	N	N	N	N
11	Laily Nurfaizy	16, Makassar, Student	"When We Were Young"	Y	Y	Y	Y
12	Resi Maulana Sandy	24, Malang, Vocal Coach	"Unconditionally"	N	N	N	N
13	Fadhilah Intan	18, Surabaya, University Student	"I Dreamed a Dream"	Y	Y	Y	Y

=== Audition 2 (December 13) ===
Order	Contestant	Identity	Song	Expert Choices			
Order	Contestant	Identity	Song	Judika	Rossa (1–11) Armand Maulana (12–15)	Ariel "Noah"	Anang Hermansyah
1	Anisa Cahayani	15, Banjarmasin, Student	"My Garden"	N	Y	Y	Y
2	Andmesh Kamaleng	19, Kupang, Employeer	"I'm Not The Only One"	Y	Y	Y	Y
3	Margareth Soumokil	24, Ambon, University Student	"Der Hölle Rache kocht in meinem Herzen"	Y	Y	Y	Y
4	Taufik Nur Hidayat	13, Semarang, Student	"7 Years"	Y	Y	Y	N
5	Yolanda Wahidah Putri	18, Padang, University Student	"Pengagum Rahasia"	Y	Y	Y	Y
6	Agung Voltage & Mieke Rahma	37 & 37, Bandung, musician	"Billionaire"	Y	Y	Y	Y
7	Mega Indriyanti	19, Bandung, University Student	"Wanita Yang Kau Pilih"	Y	Y	Y	Y
8	ZerosiX Park	21–25, Samarinda, musician	"Uptown Funk"	Y	Y	Y	Y
9	Ria Artha	19, Yogyakarta, University Student	"I Will"	N	Y	Y	Y
10	Thasya Kenang	17, Pontianak, University Student	"Dangerous Woman"	Y	Y	Y	Y
11	Fazrun	27, West Nusa Tenggara, University Student	Rock and Roll"	Y	Y	Y	Y
12	M Lukman	23, Brebes, Employeer	"Amnesia"	N	N	N	N
13	Trio Wijaya	22, Medan, University Student	"Skinny Love"	Y	Y	Y	Y
14	Hosea Yoga	25, Surabaya, University Student	"Aku Lelakimu"	N	N	N	N
15	Masterplan	23–33, Ciamis, musician	"Kemarau"	N	Y	Y	Y

=== Audition 3 (December 19) ===
Order	Contestant	Identity	Song	Expert Choices			
Order	Contestant	Identity	Song	Judika	Rossa (1–24) Armand Maulana (25–31)	Ariel "Noah"	Anang Hermansyah
1	Valeri Adelia	15, Surabaya, Student	"Feeling Good"	Y	Y	Y	N
2	Ghea Indrawari	18, Yogyakarta, University Student	"Cheap Trills"	Y	Y	Y	Y
3	Paris	27–33, Jakarta, musician	"We Found Love"	Y	Y	Y	Y
Moment Expert "Anang Hermansyah"
4	Imba Sari	25, Jakarta, Event Singer	"Remember Me This Way"	N	Y	Y	N
5	Alda Wiyekedella	17, Surabaya, Student	"Stone Cold"	Y	Y	Y	Y
6	Indah Galinda	22, Pontianak, Event Singer	"Love"	Y	Y	Y	Y
7	Tiffani Afifa	26, Jakarta, Doctor	"One and Only"	Y	Y	Y	Y
8	Chandra Aditya	19, Makassar, Freelancer	"Separuh Jiwaku Pergi"	N	N	N	N
9	Alif Rizky	22, Jakarta, entertainer	"Ride"	Y	Y	Y	N
Moment Expert "Nazril Ilham"
10	Nearvy	23 & 25, Yogyakarta, musician	"Don't Let Me Down"	N	N	N	N
11	Karina Utami	26, Makassar, Singer	"When We Were Young"	Y	Y	Y	Y
12	Jasmine Risach	15, Makassar, Student	"Side to Side"	Y	Y	Y	Y
13	Natasya Elvira	15, Jakarta, Student	"All of Me"	Y	Y	Y	Y
14	Muhammad Alif Salampessy	17, Jakarta, Student	"Raggamuffin"	Y	Y	Y	Y
Moment Expert "Rossa"
15	Fauziah Khalida	19, Padang, University Student	"Rindu"	Y	Y	Y	Y
16	Yudhit Liestantia	29, Garut, entrepreneur	"Pillowtalk"	Y	Y	Y	Y
17	Louis Eyunike	30, Surabaya, entrepreneur	"Penipu Hati"	Y	Y	Y	Y
18	Tiffany Geraldine	19, Jakarta, University Student	"Creep"	Y	Y	Y	Y
19	Hany Franky Pattikawa	28, Ambon, Singer	"Dance with My Father"	Y	Y	Y	N
Moment Expert "Judika"
20	Bolivia	27, Jakarta, Street Musician	"Higher"	N	N	N	N
21	Fadlan Arif	20, West Sulawesi, Event Singer	"Here for You"	Y	Y	Y	Y
22	Fandhika	25, Sumedang, Nursery	"A Song for You"	Y	Y	Y	Y
23	Yus Hendar	33, Bandung, Street Musician	"Use Somebody"	Y	Y	Y	Y
24	Zigzag	25–26, Medan, musician	"Bibir Lentik"	Y	Y	Y	Y
Quiz Games Judika/Rossa vs Nazril/Anang (3–2)
25	Eko Situmeang	21, Pematang Siantar, Freelancer	"Let Her Go"	Y	Y	Y	Y
26	Kristina Samosir	26, Medan, Employeer	"Bahasa Kalbu"	Y	Y	Y	Y
27	Bagja Firdaus	26, Jakarta, Event Singer	"Angels Brought Me Here"	Y	Y	Y	Y
28	Gregorius Axel	18, Denpasar, University Student	"Thinking Out Loud"	Y	Y	Y	Y
29	Siti Saniyah	16, Jakarta, Student	"Rise"	Y	Y	Y	Y
30	Ilham Novriyanto	24, Bekasi, Street Musician	"To Love Somebody"	Y	Y	Y	N

=== Audition 4 (December 20) ===
Order	Contestant	Identity	Song	Expert Choices			
Order	Contestant	Identity	Song	Judika	Rossa (1–7; 12–13) Armand Maulana (8–11; 14–19)	Ariel "Noah"	Anang Hermansyah
1	Nada & Nida	16 & 16, Bekasi, Student	"Unbreakable"	Y	Y	Y	Y
2	Uly Novita Siahaan	24, Jakarta, Freelancer	"Ain't No Way"	Y	Y	Y	N
3	Asmarani Pamela	15, Lombok, Student	"Oh! Darling"	Y	Y	Y	Y
4	Salma Salsabilla	14, Probolinggo, Student	"All I Ask"	Y	Y	Y	Y
5	Rayfa Qadra	15, Medan, Student	"Fallin'"	Y	Y	Y	Y
6	Yemima Grace	15, Jakarta, Student	"Don't You Remember"	N	N	N	Y
Live Test
7	Garcia Godinho	21, Yogyakarta, University Student	"Masterpiece"	Y	Y	Y	N
8	Syamka	21 & 22, Surabaya, musician	"I'm Yours"	Y	Y	Y	Y
9	Armuse	24–27, Medan, musician	"Love Is on the Way"	Y	Y	Y	Y
10	J.A.B	21–25, Jakarta, musician	"Love Never Felt So Good"	Y	Y	Y	Y
11	Smirnoff	35–54, Bandung, musician	"Around and Around"	Y	Y	Y	Y
12	Naima Serenia Girsang	15, Medan, Student	"Angel"	Y	Y	N	Y
13	Fade In	17 & 23, East Java, musician	"In The Name of Love"	N	Y	Y	Y
14	Iga Azwika	19, Medan, University Student	"Ten Feet Tall"	N	Y	Y	Y
15	Kanaya Pinaring	13, Malang, Student	"Nobody's Perfect"	Y	Y	Y	Y
16	G Five	19–25, Yogyakarta, musician	"Déjà Vu"	Y	Y	Y	Y
17	Olivia Febrianti	23, Bekasi, Employeer	"As Long As You're There"	N	N	N	Y
18	Emanuel Yese	22, West Kalimantan, University Student	"Wherever You Will Go"	N	N	N	N
19	Julian Taufiqur Rahman	24, Surabaya, Event Singer	"Because of You"	Y	Y	Y	Y

== Live audition ==
=== Live test (December 20) ===
Order	Contestant	Song	Percentage	Expert Choices		
Order	Contestant	Song	Percentage	Rossa	Armand Maulana	Anang Hermansyah
1	Judika	"Jadi Aku Sebentar Saja"	94%			

=== Audition 1 (December 26) ===
Order	Contestant	Song	Percentage	Expert Choices			
Order	Contestant	Song	Percentage	Armand Maulana	Rossa	Ariel "Noah"	Anang Hermansyah
1	Anisa Cahayani	"Black Widow"	86%				
2	Rr Ayu Rieke Marsella Putri	"Terlalu Lama Sendiri"	83%				
3	Bening Ayu	"Safe And Sound"	94%				
4	Ghea Indrawari	"Lush Life"	60%				
5	Masterplan	"Spectrum"	78%				
6	Fadlan Arif	"When I See You Smile"	73%				
7	Zigzag	"Kala Cinta Menggoda"	78%				
8	Asmarani Pamela	"Give Your Heart a Break"	45%				
9	Fadhilah Intan	"Time To Say Goodbye"	93%				
10	Fazrun	"TNT"	91%				

=== Audition 2 (December 27) ===
Order	Contestant	Song	Percentage	Expert Choices			
Order	Contestant	Song	Percentage	Armand Maulana	Rossa	Ariel "Noah"	Anang Hermansyah
1	Nada Nida	"Do I"	81%				
2	Ilham Novriyanto	"I Don't Want to Talk About It"	94%				
3	Laily Nurfaizy	"Gravity"	81%				
4	Muhammad Alif Salampessy	"Not Just You"	73%				
5	Paris	"Titanium"	59%				
6	Julian Taufiqur Rahman	"Isn't She Lovely"	95%				
7	Thasya Kenang	"You Lost Me"	47%				
8	Iga Azwika	"Cinta Mati III"	77%				
9	Salma Salsabilla	"Bayang Bayang Ilusi"	59%				
10	Ria Artha	"Colorblind"	43%				

=== Audition 3 (January 2) ===
Order	Contestant	Song	Percentage	Expert Choices			
Order	Contestant	Song	Percentage	Judika	Rossa	Ariel "Noah"	Armand Maulana
1	Gracia Godinho	"Faded" / "Let Me Love You"	62%				
2	Alif Rizky	"Cake by the Ocean"	79%				
3	G Five	"Hikayat Cinta"	83%				
4	Trio Wijaya	"All I Want"	94%				
5	Rayhan Satria	"Pamit"	80%				
6	Agung Voltage & Mieke Rahma	"Stereo Hearts"	94%				
7	Alda Wiyekedella	"Mamma Knows Best"	77%				
8	Eko Situmeang	"Feel"	39%				
9	Armuse	"Love of My Life"	54%				
10	Kristina Samosir	"Royals" / "XO"	50%				

=== Audition 4 (January 3) ===
Order	Contestant	Song	Percentage	Expert Choices			
Order	Contestant	Song	Percentage	Judika	Rossa	Ariel "Noah"	Armand Maulana
1	Kanaya Pinaring	"Lovesong"	74%				
2	Yus Hendar	"Lovesong"	74%				
3	Fade In	"Till It Hurts"	87%				
4	Andmesh Kamaleng	"Say You Won't Let Go"	94%				
5	Smirnoff	"I Love U Bibeh"	79%				
6	Siti Saniyah	"Ain't It Fun"	78%				
7	Gregorius Axel	"When I Was Your Man"	87%				
8	Tiffany Geraldine	"How Am I Supposed to Live Without You"	93%				
9	Syamka	"Bento"	63%				
10	Bagja Firdaus	"I'll Make Love to You"/ "End of the Road"	87%				
11	Karina Utami	"A Moment Like This"	81%				

=== Audition 5 (January 9) ===
Order	Contestant	Song	Percentage	Expert Choices			
Order	Contestant	Song	Percentage	Judika	Rossa	Ariel "Noah"	Armand Maulana
1	Natasya Elvira	"Fly Me to the Moon"	91%				
2	Taufik Nur Hidayat	"Almost Is Never Enough"	69%				
3	Margareth Soumokil	"A Question For Honour"	88%				
4	Fandika	"You & I (Nobody in the World)"	84%				
5	Yolanda W.F.	"Rise Your Star"	94%				
6	Indah Galinda	"Nurlela"	89%				
7	J.A.B	"Terlalu Manis"	85%				
8	Theresia Aprilianti Tambunan	"Better When I'm Dancin'"	79%				
9	Hardi Kornelius Tobing	"Separuh Jiwaku Pergi"	48%				
10	Yudit Liestantia	"Jealous"	87%				
11	Tiffani Afifa	"Cinta 'Kan Membawamu Kembali"	93%				

=== Audition 6 (January 10) ===
Order	Contestant	Song	Percentage	Expert Choices			
Order	Contestant	Song	Percentage	Yuni Shara	Rossa	Ariel "Noah"	Armand Maulana
1	Hany Franky Pattikawa	"Hotline Bling"	86%				
2	Mega Indriyanti	"Writing's on the Wall"	64%				
3	Ananda Iman Abraham	"Gravity"	92%				
4	Jasmine Risach	"Decode"	46%				
5	ZerosiX Park	"Have Fun, Go Mad"	90%				
6	Valeri Adelia	"Gajah"	85%				
7	Fauziah Khalida	"Kini"	93%				
8	Rayfa Qadra	"I Believe in You and Me"	78%				
9	Uly Novita Siahaan	"Rise Up"	89%				
10	Louis Eyunike	"Eye of the Needle"	90%				

== Live Duels ==
=== Duels 1 (January 16) ===
Order	Contestant	Song	Percentage	Expert Choices			
Order	Contestant	Song	Percentage	Armand Maulana	Rossa	Ariel "Noah"	Anang Hermansyah
1	Alda Wiyekedella	"Emotions"	67%				
1	Ilham Novriyanto	"Stand By Me"	74%				
2	Agung Voltage & Mieke Rahma	"Baby Boy"	81%				
2	Iga Azwika	"Rather Be"	38%				
3	Muhammad Alif Salampessy	"Blame It on the Boogie"	67.44%				
3	Bening Ayu	"No Way No"	67.47%				
4	Fadlan Arif	"Kangen"	83%				
4	Julian Taufiqur Rahman	"Versace on the Floor"	88%				
5	Zigzag	"Sweet Disposition"	51%				
5	Andmesh Kamaleng	"Dia"	94%				
6	Bagja Firdaus	"I Won't Give Up"	76%				
6	Nada Nida	"Turning Back To You"	73%				

=== Duels 2 (January 17) ===
Order	Contestant	Song	Percentage	Expert Choices			
Order	Contestant	Song	Percentage	Armand Maulana	Rossa	Ariel "Noah"	Anang Hermansyah
1	Tiffany Geraldine	"Anyer 10 Maret"	76%				
1	Siti Saniyah	"Million Reasons"	83%				
2	Alif Rizky	"Somewhere Only We Know"	55%				
2	Fazrun	"Welcome to the Jungle"	89%				
3	Srimnoff	"Marilah Kemari"	64%				
3	Gregorius Axel	"Over and Over Again"	76%				
4	Yus Hendar	"Sobat"	55%				
4	Trio Wijaya	"Benci Untuk Mencinta"	96%				
5	Fade In	"Mimpi"	48%				
5	Rayhan Satria	"Stay With Me"	91%				
6	Masterplan	"Nothing But Love"	73%				
6	Fadhilah Intan	"Love Story"	86%				

=== Duels 3 (January 23) ===
Order	Contestant	Song	Percentage	Expert Choices			
Order	Contestant	Song	Percentage	Judika	Rossa	Ariel "Noah"	Anang Hermansyah
1	Indah Galinda	"All In My Head"	83%				
1	J.A.B	"Ada Apa Denganmu"	68%				
2	Laily Nurfaizy	"I Am Changing"	83%				
2	Ananda Iman Abraham	"Cancer"	81%				
3	Valeri Adelia	"Save the Last Dance for Me"	86.74%				
3	Uly Novita Siahaan	"I'd Rather Go Blind"	86.39%				
4	Rr Ayu Rieke Marsella Putri	"Bintang di Surga"	81%				
4	Louis Eyunike	"I Am Beautiful"	75%				
5	Karina Utami	"You Make My World So Colourful"	68%				
5	Fauziah Khalida	"Cinta Sejati"	94%				
6	G Five	"Dance Like Yo Daddy"	78%				
6	Natasya Elvira	"The Way You Look Tonight"	87%				

=== Duels 4 (January 24) ===
Order	Contestant	Song	Percentage	Expert Choices			
Order	Contestant	Song	Percentage	Judika	Rossa	Ariel "Noah"	Anang Hermansyah
1	Yudhit Liestantia	"One Night Only"	79%				
1	Hany Franky Pattikawa	"Twerk It Like Miley"	77%				
2	Rayfa Qadra	"Virtual Insanity"	28%				
2	Yolanda Wahidah Putri	"Just Do What We Wanna Do"	79%				
3	ZerosiX Park	"24K Magic"	91%				
3	Fandhika	"Recovery"	74%				
4	Margareth Soumokil	"Matahari"	77%				
4	Anisa Cahayani	"Uncover"	89%				
5	Tiffani Afifa	"One Last Cry"	83%				
5	Theresia Aprilianti Tambunan	"Terpukau"	71%				

== Final duels ==
=== Final duels 1 (January 30) ===
Order	Contestant	Song	Percentage	Expert Choices			
Order	Contestant	Song	Percentage	Judika	Rossa	Ariel "Noah"	Anang Hermansyah
1	Laily Nurfaizy	"Bukan Dia Tapi Aku"	61%				
1	Julian Taufiqur Rahman	"Elang"	71%				
2	Gregorius Axel	"Tertatih"	28%				
2	Andmesh Kamaleng	"Show Me the Way Back to Your Heart"	84%				
3	Siti Saniyah	"Haruskah Ku Mati"	43%				
3	Trio Wijaya	"Saat Kau Tak Disini"	73%				
3	Bening Ayu	"Salam Rindu"	71%				
4	Tiffani Afifa	"Don't You Worry 'bout a Thing"	74%				
4	Valeri Adelia	"Million Years Ago"	77%				
5	Bagja Firdaus	"You Don't Own Me"	46%				
5	Fauziah Khalida	"Because of You"	90%				

=== Final duels 2 (January 31) ===
Order	Contestant	Song	Percentage	Expert Choices			
Order	Contestant	Song	Percentage	Judika	Rossa	Ariel "Noah"	Anang Hermansyah
1	Indah Galinda	"Side to Side"	86%				
1	Agung Voltage & Mieke Rahma	"Alien"	87%				
2	Yudhit Liestantia	"Tears"	68%				
2	Fazrun	"Loe Toe Ye"	92%				
3	ZerosiX Park	"Diana"	90%				
3	Rr Ayu Rieke Marsella Putri	Posesif"	84%				
4	Rayhan Satria	"Grenade"	73%				
4	Natasya Elvira	"Lovefool"	87%				
5	Anisa Cahayani	"We Can't Stop"	71%				
5	Yolanda Wahidah Putri	"Anugerah"	64%				
6	Ilham Novriyanto	"Beneath Your Beautiful"	76%				
6	Fadhilah Intan	"Tercipta Untukku"	86%				

== Finalist ==
Contestant	Category	Age	Occupation	Hometown
Agung Voltage & Mieke Rahma	duo	37 & 37	Musician	Bandung, West Java
Andmesh Kamaleng	solo	19	Employeer	Kupang, East Nusa Tenggara
Anisa Cahayani	solo	15	Student	Banjarmasin, South Kalimantan
Bening Ayu	solo	19	University Student	Yogyakarta, Special Region of Yogyakarta
Fadhilah Intan	solo	18	University Student	Surabaya, East Java
Fauziah Khalida	solo	19	University Student	Padang, West Sumatra
Fazrun	solo	27	University Student	West Nusa Tenggara
Julian Taufiqur Rahman	solo	24	Event Singer	Surabaya, East Java
Natasya Elvira	solo	15	Student	Jakarta
Trio Wijaya	solo	22	University Student	Medan, North Sumatra
Valeri Adelia	solo	15	Student	Surabaya, East Java
ZerosiX Park	band	21–25	Musician	Samarinda, East Kalimantan

== Elimination stage ==
=== Top 12 (February 6) ===
Order	Contestant	Song	Percentage	Expert Choices			
Order	Contestant	Song	Percentage	Armand Maulana	Rossa	Yuni Shara	Anang Hermansyah
1	Fauziah Khalida	"Galau"	81%				
2	Andmesh Kamaleng	"Surat Cinta Untuk Starla"	84%				
3	Anisa Cahayani	"Ain't My Fault"	80%				
4	Trio Wijaya	"Without You"	87%				
5	Natasya Elvira	"Sambalado"	72%				
6	Bening Ayu	"Love Yourself"	84%				
7	Fazrun	"Whole Lotta Love"	88%				
8	ZerosiX Park	"I Got You (I Feel Good)"	92%				
9	Fadhilah Intan	"Harmoni Cinta"	82%				
10	Agung Voltage & Mieke Rahma	"Dilemma"	88%				
11	Julian Taufiqur Rahman	"Untukku"	88%				
12	Valeri Adelia	"Valerie"	76%				

=== Top 10 (February 13) ===
Order	Contestant	Song	Percentage	Expert Choices			
Order	Contestant	Song	Percentage	Judika	Rossa	Ariel "Noah"	Anang Hermansyah
1	Anisa Cahayani	"Hey Mama"	57%				
2	Trio Wijaya	"Piece By Piece"	67%				
3	Agung Voltage & Mieke Rahma	"The Monster"	86%				
4	Bening Ayu	"Jerawat Rindu"	75%				
5	Fazrun	"Kau Pikir Kaulah Segala"	83%				
6	Andmesh Kamaleng	"Lean On"	85%				
7	ZerosiX Park	"Bad Romance"	88%				
8	Fadhilah Intan	"Chandelier"	83%				
9	Fauziah Khalida	"We Found Love"	90%				
10	Julian Taufiqur Rahman	"Black or White"	86%				

Non-performance

Order	Contestant	Song	Percentage	Expert Choices		
Order	Contestant	Song	Percentage	Judika	Ariel "Noah"	Anang Hermansyah
1	Rossa	"Cinta Dalam Hidupku"	92%			

=== Top 9 (February 20) ===
Order	Contestant	Song	Percentage	Expert Choices			
Order	Contestant	Song	Percentage	Judika	Rossa	Ariel "Noah"	Armand Maulana
1	Fazrun	"Welcome to the Black Parade"	83%				
2	Julian Taufiqur Rahman	"FourFiveSeconds"	77%				
3	Agung Voltage & Mieke Rahma	"Dessert"	83%				
4	Fadhilah Intan	"Cinta"	69%				
5	ZerosiX Park	"Cinta"	90%				
6	Bening Ayu	"Shake It Off"	82%				
7	Andmesh Kamaleng	"Salahkah Aku Terlalu Mencintaimu"	88%				
8	Trio Wijaya	"Seberapa Pantas"	89%				
9	Fauziah Khalida	"Secret Love Song"	92%				

=== Top 8 (February 27) ===
Order	Contestant	Song	Percentage	Expert Choices			
Order	Contestant	Song	Percentage	Judika	Armand Maulana	Ariel "Noah"	Anang Hermansyah
1	Bening Ayu	"Umbrella"	80%				
2	Fauziah Khalida	"Berharap Tak Berpisah"	79%				
3	Fazrun	"Don't Let Me Down"	80%				
4	Andmesh Kamaleng	"Hymn for the Weekend"	87%				
5	Agung Voltage & Mieke Rahma	"Nakal"	85%				
6	Julian Taufiqur Rahman	"Cinta Abadi"	66%				
7	Trio Wijaya	"Lost Stars"	91%				
8	ZerosiX Park	"Heavy Rotation"	89%				

Non-performance

Order	Contestant	Song	Percentage	Expert Choices			
Order	Contestant	Song	Percentage	Judika	Nirina Zubir	Ariel "Noah"	Anang Hermansyah
1	Armand Maulana	"Sebelah Mata"	93%				

=== Top 7 (March 6) ===
Order	Contestant	Song	Percentage	Expert Choices			
Order	Contestant	Song	Percentage	Judika	Rossa	Ariel "Noah"	Anang Hermansyah
1	Agung Voltage & Mieke Rahma	"Jemu" / "Can't Get Enough"	81%				
2	Andmesh Kamaleng	"Halo"	82%				
3	Fazrun	"Suci Dalam Debu"	83%				
4	Trio Wijaya	"Cinta Dan Benci"	85%				
5	ZerosiX Park	"Get Lucky"	87%				
6	Fauziah Khalida	"I Will Survive"	84%				
7	Bening Ayu	"Shape of You"	79%				

Non-performance

Order	Contestant	Song	Percentage	Expert Choices		
Order	Contestant	Song	Percentage	Judika	Rossa	Ariel "Noah"
1	Virzha and Anang Hermansyah	"Aku Lelakimu"	87%			

=== Top 6 (March 13) ===
Order	Contestant	Song	Percentage	Expert Choices			
Order	Contestant	Song	Percentage	Judika	Rossa	Ariel "Noah"	Anang Hermansyah
1	Fazrun	"Enter Sandman"	80%				
2	Trio Wijaya	"Dancing On My Own"	81%				
3	Andmesh Kamaleng	"Jera"	81%				
4	ZerosiX Park	"Kehidupan"	86%				
5	Fauziah Khalida	"Sementara Sendiri"	88%				
6	Agung Voltage & Mieke Rahma	"I Gotta Feeling" / "Gangnam Style"	75%				

Non-performance

Order	Contestant	Song	Percentage	Expert Choices			
Order	Contestant	Song	Percentage	Judika	Rossa	Ariel "Noah"	Anang Hermansyah
1	Honne	"Warm On a Cold Night"	—N/a				
2	Shane Filan	"My Love"	96%				
2	Shane Filan	"Beautiful In White"	—N/a				

== Semi-final (March 20) ==
Order	Contestant	Song	Percentage	Expert Choices			
Order	Contestant	Song	Percentage	Judika	Ari Lasso	Ariel "Noah"	Armand Maulana
1	Trio Wijaya	"Pelan-Pelan Saja"	80%				
2	Fazrun	"Aku Terjatuh"	71%				
3	ZerosiX Park	"I Miss You But I Hate You"	80%				
4	Andmesh Kamaleng	"Asal Kau Bahagia"	87%				
5	Fauziah Khalida	"Cinta Dalam Hati"	90%				

Non-performance

Order	Contestant	Song	Percentage	Expert Choices			
Order	Contestant	Song	Percentage	Judika	Nirina Zubir	Ariel "Noah"	Armand Maulana
1	Ari Lasso	"Dunia Maya"	93%				

Order	Contestant	Song	Percentage	Expert Choices			
Order	Contestant	Song	Percentage	Judika	Ari Lasso	Boy William	Armand Maulana
2	Ariel "Noah"	"Iris"	94%				

== Finale (March 27) ==
First Round

In the first round, expert's vote each worth 5%

Order	Contestant	Song	Percentage	Expert Choices			
Order	Contestant	Song	Percentage	Judika	Rossa	Ariel "Noah"	Anang Hermansyah
1	Trio Wijaya	"The Second You Sleep"	60%				
2	Fauziah Khalida	"Bawalah Cintaku"	72%				
3	ZerosiX Park	"Runaway Baby"	71%				
4	Andmesh Kamaleng	"Aku Cuma Punya Hati"	78%				

Finale Round

In the finale round, expert's vote each worth 3%. Both voting results from the first round and the final round will be accumulated. The highest score will be the winner of Rising Star Indonesia.

Order	Contestant	Song	Percentage	Expert Choices			
Order	Contestant	Song	Percentage	Judika	Rossa	Ariel "Noah"	Anang Hermansyah
1	Fauziah Khalida	"Fight Song"	68%				
2	Andmesh Kamaleng	"Making Love Out of Nothing at All"	80%				

Non Performance

Order	Contestant	Song	Percentage	Expert Choices			
Order	Contestant	Song	Percentage	Judika	Rossa	Ariel "Noah"	Anang Hermansyah
1	4 Finale Contestants, Osvaldo Rio, Hanin Dhiya, Indah Nevertari & Ghaitsa Kenang	"Rockabye"	—N/a				
2	Gigi	"Nakal" "Jomblo" "Ya Ya Ya"	—N/a				
4	Judika, Rossa, Ariel "Noah" & Anang Hermansyah	"Mengejar Matahari"	—N/a				
5	Andmesh Kamaleng & Fauziah Khalida	"Buktikan"	—N/a				

Order	Contestant	Song	Percentage	Expert Choices			
Order	Contestant	Song	Percentage	Judika	Rossa	Ariel "Noah"	Boy William
3	Anang Hermansyah & Ashanty	"Like I'm Gonna Lose You"	92%				

== Elimination table ==
Position	Artist	Week 1	Week 2	Week 3	Week 4	Week 5	Week 6	Week 7	Week 8	
1	Andmesh Kamaleng	84%	85%	88%	87%	82%	81%	87%	78%	1st 80%
2	Fauziah Khalida	81%	90%	92%	79%	84%	88%	90%	72%	2nd 68%
3	ZerosiX Park	92%	88%	90%	89%	87%	86%	80%	71%	Did not advance
4	Trio Wijaya	87%	67%	89%	91%	85%	81%	80%	60%	Did not advance
5	Fazrun	88%	83%	83%	80%	83%	80%	71%	Eliminated (Week 7)	
6	Agung & Mieke	88%	86%	83%	85%	81%	75%	Eliminated (Week 6)		
7	Bening Ayu	84%	75%	82%	80%	79%	Eliminated (Week 5)			
8	Julian Taufiqur Rahman	88%	86%	77%	66%	Eliminated (Week 4)				
9	Fadhilah Intan	82%	83%	69%	Eliminated (Week 3)					
10	Anisa Cahayani	80%	57%	Eliminated (Week 2)						
11	Valeri Adelia	76%	Eliminated (Week 1)							
12	Natasya Elvira	72%	Eliminated (Week 1)							

Notes

1. Rossa giving the vote too from Judika's voting table because Judika was singing at that time.
2. Ariel giving the vote too from Rossa's voting table because Rossa was singing at that time.
3. The co-host of this show, Nirina give a vote because she is want to try to become an expert.
4. Ariel giving the vote too from Anang's voting table because Anang was singing at that time.
5. The host of this show, Boy give a vote because he is want to try to become an expert.

== Contestant who appeared on other talent shows ==
- Thasya Kenang, Chandra Aditya, Tiffany Geraldine and Siti Saniyah previously auditioned for The Voice Indonesia in 2016.
- Salma Salsabilla previously auditioned for The Voice Kids Indonesia in 2016 from team Agnez Mo where she was eliminated in the Battle Rounds.
- Innocent Purwanto (Part of Fade In) previously auditioned for Rising Star Indonesia Season 1.
