= Bens Leo =

Indonesian music journalist (1952–2021)

- Born: Benedictus Hadi Utomo; August 8, 1952; Pasuruan, Jawa Timur, Indonesia
- Died: November 28, 2021 (aged 69); Jakarta, Indonesia
- Occupations: Journalist; Music critic

Benedictus Hadi Utomo, better known as Bens Leo, was an Indonesian music journalist. He was also recognized as an observer of music and entertainment in Indonesia. Bens was one of the early members of the socialization team for the Anugerah Musik Indonesia (AMI) awards. He was also known as a talent scout and music producer, notably producing Kahitna's debut album, titled Cerita Cinta, in 1993. He once served as editor-in-chief of the youth magazine Anita Cemerlang, which featured short stories and lifestyle content.

== Career ==
His career began after he failed to enroll at the AKABRI because he missed the registration deadline for flight training in Curug. Unwilling to burden his single mother with tuition fees, he boldly decided to interview Koes Plus member Tonny Koeswoyo using whatever equipment he had. Fortunately, Tonny humbly agreed to the interview. He sent the article to the Sport & Film section of the newspaper Berita Yudha, and a week later, his piece titled "Sejarah Koes Bersaudara" ("The History of Koes Brothers") was published as the headline story. He was then recruited to write for the Arts and Culture section. Learning about this, Tonny Koeswoyo referred him to interview Panbers.

His interview with Panbers was published in Aktuil magazine, where he was later given the pen name "Bens Leo". His career progressed rapidly as he covered acts like Rasela, Gipsy, and Barong’s Band, as well as events such as the Festival Lagu Pop Indonesia. In 1974, he was appointed a jury member for the Festival Lagu Pop Indonesia, which led to the World Popular Song Festival in Tokyo, Japan. In 1976, he was personally invited—under his own name and as a representative of Aktuil—as the only Indonesian music journalist to cover the 1976 World Popular Song Festival in Tokyo, accompanying Guruh Soekarnoputra, Grace Simon, and Idris Sardi.

In 2000, he was invited by musician and businessman Maxi Gunawan to help establish a print media music business empire, later named NewsMusik. However, he resigned in 2003.

== Fighting piracy ==
Bens Leo was a vocal opponent of music piracy. For him, the issue was not only the responsibility of record labels or the government, but also of fellow musicians. He believed that rampant copyright infringement and piracy were also driven by the decline in physical music sales.

== Personal life ==
Bens Leo was married to Pauline Endang and had one son, Addo Gustaf Putra. The family resided in the Cireundeu Permai housing complex, in Ciputat, South Tangerang.

Bens Leo died on 29 November 2021 in Jakarta due to COVID-19.
