= Rising Star Indonesia season 3 =

Rising Star Indonesia
- Season 3
- Hosted by: Boy William; Robby Purba; Sere Kalina
- Judges: Judika; Yovie Widianto; Ariel "Noah"; Rossa
- Winner: Elvan Saragih
- Runner-up: Logonta Tarigan

Release
- Original network: RCTI
- Original release: 17 December 2018 – 8 April 2019

Season chronology
- ← Previous; Season 2

The third season of Rising Star Indonesia aired on RCTI starting 17 December 2018. Judika, Ariel "Noah", and Rossa returned as experts from the previous season, while Indonesian composer Yovie Widianto replaced Anang Hermansyah. Audition was held in four major cities in Indonesia: Bandung, Surabaya, Medan, and Jakarta.

== Regional Auditions ==
Cities where the auditions were held.

On 11 September 2018, it was announced that Rising Star Indonesia 2018 would begin the auditions in four big cities in Indonesia: Bandung, Medan, Surabaya, and Jakarta. Four cities also added as a special hunt auditions, those cities are Yogyakarta, Kupang, Makassar, and Ambon. Those who passed their first audition would go in front of the experts in Room Auditions.

The open call auditions were held in the following locations:

Date	Audition venue	Location
September 22, 2018	Sabuga Center	Bandung
September 29, 2016	Medan International Convention Center	Medan
October 11, 2016	Balai Prajurit	Surabaya
October 26–28, 2016	MNC Tower	Jakarta

== Room Auditions ==
The room auditions aired over five episodes from 17 December 2018 until 24 January 2019. The contestants who passed the first auditions then asked to sing their chosen song, and then at the end the experts would comment and also decided whether the contestant could go to the next round with a yes or a no. The contestant that received at least three yeses advanced to the Live Auditions. 70 soloist, duos, and group bands later selected to go through to the Live Auditions.

== Live Auditions ==
Each performance begins with the contestant singing behind a screen ("The Wall"). Once the contestant reaches 70% of "Yes" votes, the wall was raised and the contestant goes to the next round of the competition. Alongside the viewers' vote, four of the experts have 5% of the vote each, which will be added should they vote "Yes". New twist was added this season, each experts had a golden arrow vote to immediately save a contestant who failed to reach the minimum bar to open the wall.

Color key

Yes	Expert gave a yes vote
No	Expert gave a no vote
Saved	Expert gave the golden arrow vote
	Contestant advanced to the next round
	Contestant advanced to the next round after received the golden arrow vote
	Contestant was eliminated

=== Live Auditions 1 (Jan. 7) ===
Order	Contestant	Age	Hometown	Song	Score	Expert Vote				Result
Order	Contestant	Age	Hometown	Song	Score	Judika	Rossa	Nazril Irham	Yovie Widianto	Result
1	Jacqueline Caroline	16	Batam	"I'd Rather Go Blind"	47%	Yes	Saved	Yes	Yes	Golden Vote
2	Adriansyah Alfaridzi	25	Bekasi	"I'll Never Love Again"	27%	No	No	Yes	No	Eliminated
3	Rayfa Qadra	17	Medan	"Mantan Terindah"	43%	Yes	Yes	No	Yes	Eliminated
4	Sasya Sava	19	Jakarta	"Takkan Terganti"	42%	Yes	Yes	Yes	Yes	Eliminated
5	Fathdina Kartika	17	Malang	"Don't You Worry 'bout a Thing"	44%	Yes	Yes	Yes	Yes	Eliminated
6	Ringga Desilina	41	Jakarta	"Piece Of My Heart"	41%	Yes	Yes	Yes	Yes	Eliminated
7	Angeline Victoria	15	Surabaya	"Ride"	77%	Yes	Yes	Yes	Yes	Advanced
8	Krishna Mukti	22	Denpasar	"Let It Be"	83%	Yes	Yes	Yes	Yes	Advanced
9	Febrian Naben	18	Poso	"Jadi Gila"	59%	Yes	Yes	Yes	Yes	Eliminated
10	Cantika Salma	16	Kediri	"Bukan Untukku"	76%	Yes	Yes	Yes	Yes	Advanced
11	Achmad Ma'mun	28	Bandung	"Adventure of a Lifetime"	90%	Yes	Yes	Yes	Yes	Advanced

=== Live Auditions 2 (Jan. 8) ===
Order	Contestant	Age	Hometown	Song	Score	Expert Vote				Result
Order	Contestant	Age	Hometown	Song	Score	Judika	Rossa	Nazril Irham	Yovie Widianto	Result
1	Salwa Jasmine	17	Malang	"Royals"	80%	Yes	Yes	Yes	Yes	Advanced
2	Ellan Palestina	27	Bekasi	"Jadi Aku Sebentar Saja"	82%	Yes	Yes	Yes	Yes	Advanced
3	Igan Andhika	17	Bogor	"It Will Rain"	90%	Yes	Yes	Yes	Yes	Advanced
4	Sadirono	24 & 25	Yogyakarta	"Havana" / "Cinta"	49%	No	Yes	No	No	Eliminated
5	Reza Dharmawangsa	20	Bandung	"Die in Your Arms"	79%	Yes	Yes	No	Yes	Advanced
6	Parto Fransiskus	15	Bekasi	"Feeling Good"	91%	Yes	Yes	Yes	Yes	Advanced
7	Shelby Aditya	20	Bandung	"Ddu-Du Ddu-Du"	73%	Yes	Yes	No	Yes	Advanced
8	Indah Aqila	18	Medan	"Warrior"	78%	Yes	Yes	No	No	Advanced
9	Dewa Krisna	22	Gianyar	"Kangen (Ku Akan Datang)"	75%	No	Yes	Yes	Yes	Advanced
10	Fadilah Khalda	19	Banten	"Don't You Remember"	90%	Yes	Yes	Yes	Yes	Advanced
11	Yohanes	19	Depok	"Always"	51%	No	Yes	Yes	No	Eliminated
12	Yenny Christianti	29	Jakarta	"All We Know"	76%	Yes	Yes	No	Yes	Advanced

=== Live Auditions 3 (Jan. 14) ===
Order	Contestant	Age	Hometown	Song	Score	Expert Vote				Result
Order	Contestant	Age	Hometown	Song	Score	Judika	Rossa	Nazril Irham	Yovie Widianto	Result
1	Tarishah Firdianti	15	Malang	"Jangan"	60%	No	Yes	Yes	Yes	Eliminated
2	Elvan Saragih	19	Jakarta	"Every Time I Close My Eyes"	86%	Yes	Yes	Yes	Yes	Advanced
3	Inggrid Wakano	19	Kupang	"Selalu Cinta"	88%	Yes	Yes	Yes	Yes	Advanced
4	Muhammad Zayyan	18	Tangerang	"Topik Semalam"	45%	No	Yes	No	No	Eliminated
5	Mirriam Eka	19	Yogyakarta	"Sebuah Rasa"	70%	No	Yes	No	No	Advanced
6	R&D	23 & 26	Kupang	"Get Up, Stand Up"	86%	Yes	Yes	Yes	Yes	Advanced
7	She's Bro	22-24	Pontianak	"Story of My Life"	77%	Yes	Yes	Yes	No	Advanced
8	Vilmasheila Vereira	17	Yogyakarta	"Gloomy Sunday"	45%	Yes	Yes	Yes	Yes	Eliminated
9	Alya Bintang	15	Boyolali	"Something's Got a Hold on Me"	81%	Yes	Yes	Yes	Yes	Advanced
10	Lucas Hutauruk	21	Medan	"Jangan Berhenti Mencintaiku"	32%	No	No	No	No	Eliminated
11	Fenny Febiany	31	Surabaya	"I Don't Want to Miss a Thing"	46%	No	No	No	No	Eliminated

=== Live Auditions 4 (Jan. 15) ===
Order	Contestant	Age	Hometown	Song	Score	Expert Vote				Result
Order	Contestant	Age	Hometown	Song	Score	Judika	Rossa	Nazril Irham	Yovie Widianto	Result
1	Efo Lala	23	Medan	"Flying Without Wings"	58%	No	No	No	Yes	Eliminated
2	Waode Hasriani	17	Makassar	"Run to You"	86%	Yes	Yes	Yes	No	Advanced
3	Yohana Tarigan	19	Medan	"Killing Me Softly with His Song"	86%	Yes	Yes	Yes	Yes	Advanced
4	D'Bamboo	21-30	Medan	"Have You Ever Seen the Rain?"	77%	Yes	Yes	Yes	No	Advanced
5	Novi Sundari	23	Medan	"Kiss from a Rose"	51%	No	Yes	No	No	Eliminated
6	Agnes Indah	19	Semarang	"Sandiwara Cinta"	80%	No	Yes	No	Yes	Advanced
7	Tongkat Kayu	21-27	Banten	"Bujangan"	60%	No	Yes	No	No	Eliminated
8	Windy Fajriah	18	Jakarta	"Brokenhearted"	60%	No	No	No	Yes	Eliminated
9	Alison Voices	18-22	Yogyakarta	"This Is Me"	72%	Yes	Yes	No	Yes	Advanced
10	Tiurma Panggabean	24	Medan	"The Scientist"	52%	No	Yes	No	No	Eliminated
11	Ayu Gurnita	16	Bandung	"Mimpi"	77%	No	Yes	No	Yes	Advanced
12	Aurelia Xena	18	Yogyakarta	"Don't Stop Me Now"	66%	No	Yes	No	Yes	Eliminated

=== Live Auditions 5 (Jan. 21) ===
Order	Contestant	Age	Hometown	Song	Score	Expert Vote				Result
Order	Contestant	Age	Hometown	Song	Score	Judika	Rossa	Nazril Irham	Yovie Widianto	Result
1	Truly Lidya	17	Jakarta	"Fallin'"	80%	Yes	Yes	Yes	No	Advanced
2	Suci Sitorus	17	Medan	"Never Enough"	75%	Yes	Yes	No	Yes	Advanced
3	Yemima Grace	17	Jakarta	"Jar of Hearts"	78%	Yes	Yes	Yes	Yes	Advanced
4	Galih Widya	19	Pemalang	"Gambang Semarang"	46%	No	No	No	No	Eliminated
5	Refo Abidar	19	Jakarta	"Gravity"	58%	Yes	Yes	Yes	No	Eliminated
6	Bryce Adam	21	Luwuk	"Ku Salah Menilai"	95%	Yes	Yes	Yes	Yes	Advanced
7	SAS	20-25	Jakarta	"God is a woman"	78%	Yes	Yes	No	No	Advanced
8	Syifa Afnan	15	Jakarta	"COPYCAT"	74%	No	Yes	Yes	Yes	Advanced
9	Karen Claudia	16	Bekasi	"My Everything"	84%	Yes	Yes	Yes	Yes	Advanced
10	Bagus Wicaksono	25	Tegal	"You're the Inspiration"	80%	No	Yes	No	Yes	Advanced
11	Yoga Yeristri	17	Tangerang	"Seribu Tahun Lamanya"	78%	Yes	Yes	Yes	Yes	Advanced
12	Maretha Primadani	17	Lamongan	"Side to Side"	60%	No	No	No	No	Eliminated

=== Live Auditions 6 (Jan. 22) ===
Order	Contestant	Age	Hometown	Song	Score	Expert Vote				Result
Order	Contestant	Age	Hometown	Song	Score	Judika	Rossa	Nazril Irham	Yovie Widianto	Result
1	Siti Rosalia	17	Mataram	"Roxanne"	81%	Yes	Yes	Yes	Yes	Advanced
2	Salma Faradhila	17	Klaten	"Rapuh"	79%	Yes	Yes	No	Yes	Advanced
3	Natasya Rachel	20	Surabaya	"Can't Take My Eyes Off You"	68%	No	Yes	No	Yes	Eliminated
4	Athifah Anggraeni	18	Makassar	"Benci Untuk Mencinta"	78%	Yes	Yes	No	No	Advanced
5	Indah Madya	18	Padang	"Cinta Satukan Kita"	34%	No	No	No	No	Eliminated
6	Vadhlil Amaya	26	Pekanbaru	"Englishman in New York"	77%	Yes	Yes	Yes	No	Advanced
7	Ratu Harahap	20	Medan	"My Heart Will Go On"	46%	No	No	No	No	Eliminated
8	Logonta Tarigan	23	Medan	"Dive"	83%	Yes	Yes	Yes	Yes	Advanced
9	Andika Irwan	25	Makassar	"End of the Road"	75%	Yes	Yes	Yes	Yes	Advanced
10	Ratih Pradnyaswari	21	Gianyar	"Best Mistake"	76%	No	Yes	Yes	Yes	Advanced
11	Reza Fahlevi	20	Banda Aceh	"Menghitung Hari 2"	46%	No	No	No	No	Eliminated
12	Yayang Caesar	20	Surakarta	"Shape of You"	93%	Yes	Yes	Yes	Yes	Advanced

== Live Duels ==
Contestants who make it through the auditions are paired by the judges to face off in a duel. The first contestant to sing, chosen by a coin toss before the show, sings with the wall up and sets the benchmark for the second contestant. The second contestant sings with the wall down. If the second contestant betters the first contestant's vote total, the wall rises and the second contestant was through to the next round while the first contestant is eliminated; if the second contestant fails to raise the wall, the second contestant is eliminated and the first contestant was through. A new twist also introduced this season, each experts could pick two contestants who lost their duels, so there will be 8 wild card contestants who could participate in the next round, The Final Duels.

Color key

Yes	Expert gave a yes vote
No	Expert gave a no vote
	Contestant won their duels and advanced to the next round
	Contestant lost their duels but received the wild card
	Contestant lost their duels and was eliminated

=== Live Duels 1 (Jan. 28) ===
Order	Contestant	Song	Score	Expert Vote				Result
Order	Contestant	Song	Score	Judika	Rossa	Nazril Irham	Yovie Widianto	Result
1	Shelby Aditya	"Penipu Hati"	51%	No	No	No	No	Eliminated
1	Achmad Ma'mun	"Say You Won't Let Go"	82%	Yes	Yes	Yes	Yes	Advanced
2	Parto Fransiskus	"Kemarin"	66%	Yes	Yes	No	No	Wild Card
2	Alya Bintang	"Masterpiece"	71%	Yes	Yes	Yes	Yes	Advanced
3	She's Bro	"Akad"	76%	Yes	Yes	Yes	Yes	Advanced
3	Fadilah Khalda	"Kekasih Sejati"	58%	No	No	Yes	No	Eliminated
4	Indah Aqila	"Tega"	47%	Yes	Yes	No	No	Eliminated
4	Reza Darmawangsa	"Too Much to Ask"	87%	Yes	Yes	Yes	Yes	Advanced
5	Krishna Mukti	"Pupus"	65%	No	Yes	No	Yes	Wild Card
5	Ayu Gurnita	"Jangan Rubah Takdirku"	78%	Yes	Yes	No	Yes	Advanced

=== Live Duels 2 (Jan. 29) ===
Order	Contestant	Song	Score	Expert Vote				Result
Order	Contestant	Song	Score	Judika	Rossa	Nazril Irham	Yovie Widianto	Result
1	Angeline Victoria	"Thunder" / "Young Dumb & Broke"	83%	Yes	Yes	Yes	Yes	Advanced
1	Yenny Christiani	"Something Just like This"	69%	Yes	Yes	Yes	Yes	Wild Card
2	Salwa Jasmine	"Mercy"	79%	Yes	Yes	Yes	Yes	Advanced
2	Mirriam Eka	"Bukannya Aku Takut"	75%	Yes	Yes	Yes	No	Wild Card
3	Yohana Tarigan	"Always Remember Us This Way"	73%	Yes	Yes	Yes	Yes	Wild Card
3	Igan Andhika	"You Are the Reason"	85%	Yes	Yes	Yes	Yes	Advanced
4	Ellan Palestina	"Bamboléo"	77%	Yes	Yes	Yes	Yes	Advanced
4	Jacqueline Caroline	"Nobody Love"	68%	Yes	Yes	Yes	Yes	Wild Card
5	Cantika Salma	"Bimbang"	69%	Yes	Yes	Yes	Yes	Wild Card
5	R&D	"Inikah Cinta"	72%	Yes	Yes	Yes	Yes	Advanced

=== Live Duels 3 (Feb. 3) ===
Order	Contestant	Song	Score	Expert Vote				Result
Order	Contestant	Song	Score	Judika	Rossa	Nazril Irham	Yovie Widianto	Result
1	Agnes Indah	"Sway"	79%	No	Yes	Yes	Yes	Advanced
1	Andhika Irwan	"Setengah Hati"	44%	No	No	No	No	Eliminated
2	Truly Lidya	"If I Were a Boy"	73%	Yes	Yes	Yes	Yes	Eliminated
2	Alison Voices	"The Prayer"	83%	Yes	Yes	Yes	Yes	Advanced
3	Inggrid Wakano	"How Do I Live"	81%	Yes	Yes	Yes	Yes	Advanced
3	Yoga Yeristri	"Back at One"	55%	No	Yes	No	No	Eliminated
4	D'Bamboo	"Rumah Kita"	77%	Yes	Yes	Yes	Yes	Eliminated
4	Yayang Caesar	"All About That Bass"	79%	Yes	Yes	Yes	Yes	Advanced
5	Ratih Pradnyaswari	"Cinta Sejati"	38%	No	No	No	No	Eliminated
5	Salma Faradhila	"Wrecking Ball"	91%	Yes	Yes	Yes	Yes	Advanced
6	Athifah Anggraeni	"Make You Feel My Love"	65%	No	Yes	Yes	No	Eliminated
6	Bagus Wicaksono	"Nothing's Gonna Change My Love for You"	79%	Yes	Yes	Yes	Yes	Advanced

=== Live Duels 4 (Feb. 4) ===
Order	Contestant	Song	Score	Expert Vote				Result
Order	Contestant	Song	Score	Judika	Rossa	Nazril Irham	Yovie Widianto	Result
1	Elvan Saragih	"Esok Kan Masih Ada"	78%	Yes	Yes	Yes	Yes	Advanced
1	Dewa Krisna	"Imagine"	70%	Yes	Yes	Yes	Yes	Eliminated
2	Yemima Grace	"Because of You"	66%	Yes	Yes	Yes	Yes	Eliminated
2	Waode Hasriani	"Broken Vow"	81%	Yes	Yes	Yes	Yes	Advanced
3	Bryce Adam	"I Still Believe in You"	63%	No	Yes	No	No	Eliminated
3	Suci Sitorus	"Bias Sinar"	65%	Yes	Yes	Yes	Yes	Advanced
4	Syifa Adnan	"Dari Mata"	47%	No	No	No	No	Eliminated
4	Karen Claudia	"Almost Is Never Enough"	87%	Yes	Yes	Yes	Yes	Advanced
5	SAS	"Mengejar Matahari"	64%	Yes	Yes	No	Yes	Eliminated
5	Siti Rosalia	"How Deep Is Your Love"	84%	Yes	Yes	Yes	Yes	Advanced
6	Logonta Tarigan	"I Want You Back"	84%	Yes	Yes	Yes	Yes	Advanced
6	Vadhlil Amaya	"It's a Man's Man's Man's World"	80%	Yes	Yes	Yes	Yes	Wild Card

=== Wild Card Round (Feb. 11) ===
Order	Contestant	Song	Score	Expert Vote				Result
Order	Contestant	Song	Score	Judika	Rossa	Nazril Irham	Yovie Widianto	Result
1	Krishna Mukti	"Heaven"	81%	Yes	Yes	Yes	Yes	Advanced
2	Cantika Salma	"Who's Lovin' You"	73%	Yes	Yes	Yes	Yes	Eliminated
3	Mirriam Eka	"Harusnya Kau Pilih Aku"	88%	Yes	Yes	Yes	Yes	Advanced
4	Vadhlil Amaya	"I Got You (I Feel Good)"	83%	Yes	Yes	Yes	Yes	Advanced
5	Jacqueline Caroline	"Stand Up for Love"	84%	Yes	Yes	Yes	Yes	Advanced
6	Parto Fransiskus	"Feel It Still"	77%	Yes	Yes	Yes	Yes	Eliminated
7	Yenny Christiani	"When You're Gone"	61%	No	Yes	Yes	Yes	Eliminated
8	Yohana Tarigan	"Titanium"	73%	Yes	Yes	Yes	Yes	Eliminated

== Final Duels ==
Similar as The Live Duels in previous round which the first contestant sings with the wall up and sets the benchmark for the second contestant, and the second contestant sings with the wall down. If the second contestant betters the first contestant's vote total, the wall rises and the second contestant was through to the next round while the first contestant is eliminated, and applies to the opposite. The winner of this round will advanced to the next round, The Playoffs. And from this round on, the show only aired once a week.

Color key

Yes	Expert gave a yes vote
No	Expert gave a no vote
	Contestant won their duels and advanced to the next round
	Contestant lost their duels and was eliminated

=== Final Duels 1 (Feb. 18) ===
Nazril Irham couldn't attend the live show and replaced by Maia Estianty

Order	Contestant	Song	Score	Expert Vote				Result
Order	Contestant	Song	Score	Judika	Rossa	Maia Estianty	Yovie Widianto	Result
1	Inggid Wakano	"I'll Stand by You"	50%	No	No	No	No	Eliminated
1	Salma Faradhila	"idontwannabeyouanymore"	82%	Yes	Yes	Yes	Yes	Advanced
2	Suci Sitorus	"The Power of Love"	55%	Yes	No	No	No	Eliminated
2	Logonta Tarigan	"I'm Not the Only One"	84%	Yes	Yes	Yes	Yes	Advanced
3	Ellan Palestina	"Suara Hatiku"	52%	No	Yes	No	No	Eliminated
3	Angeline Victoria	"Blank Space"	62%	No	No	No	Yes	Advanced
4	Agnes Indah	"Kisah Cintaku"	67%	Yes	Yes	Yes	Yes	Eliminated
4	Mirriam Eka	"Ratu Sejagad"	75%	Yes	Yes	No	Yes	Advanced
5	Ayu Gurnita	"Cinta Pertama dan Terakhir"	56%	No	Yes	No	Yes	Advanced
5	Reza Darmawangsa	"Treat You Better"	54%	No	No	No	Yes	Eliminated
6	R&D	"Could You Be Loved"	71%	Yes	Yes	No	Yes	Advanced
6	Krishna Mukti	"Come Together"	67%	Yes	Yes	No	Yes	Eliminated

=== Final Duels 2 (Feb. 25) ===
Order	Contestant	Song	Score	Expert Vote				Result
Order	Contestant	Song	Score	Judika	Rossa	Nazril Irham	Yovie Widianto	Result
1	Salwa Jasmine	"Rumour Has It"	74%	Yes	Yes	Yes	Yes	Advanced
1	Waode Hasriani	"Remember Me This Way"	73%	Yes	Yes	Yes	Yes	Eliminated
2	Karen Claudia	"Lay Me Down"	76%	Yes	Yes	Yes	Yes	Eliminated
2	Siti Rosalia	"Menghujam Jantungku"	83%	Yes	Yes	Yes	Yes	Advanced
3	She's Bro	"Never Say Never"	68%	Yes	Yes	Yes	Yes	Eliminated
3	Jacqueline Caroline	"Rewrite the Stars"	84%	Yes	Yes	Yes	Yes	Advanced
4	Alison Voices	"The Greatest Show"	67%	Yes	Yes	Yes	Yes	Eliminated
4	Vadhlil Amaya	"Eye of the Tiger"	87%	Yes	Yes	Yes	Yes	Advanced
5	Achmad Ma'mun	"Everybody's Changing"	71%	Yes	Yes	Yes	Yes	Eliminated
5	Elvan Saragih	"Chunky"	72%	Yes	Yes	Yes	Yes	Advanced
6	Bagus Wicaksono	"I Live My Life for You"	63%	Yes	Yes	Yes	Yes	Eliminated
6	Igan Andhika	"All of Me"	88%	Yes	Yes	Yes	Yes	Advanced
7	Alya Bintang	"Mamma Knows Best"	65%	Yes	Yes	Yes	Yes	Eliminated
7	Yayang Caesar	"Kala Cinta Menggoda"	89%	Yes	Yes	Yes	Yes	Advanced

== Live Playoffs ==
After the final duel rounds end, 13 of the contestants that survived perform. The first 2 contestants performed with the wall up, after which the contestant with the lowest vote total was placed in the hot seat. The subsequent contestants performed with the wall down, and they had to beat the vote total of the contestant in the hot seat to raise the wall. If they succeeded in doing so, the contestant in the hot seat was eliminated, the contestant with the next lowest vote total was placed in the hot seat, and the performing contestant was provisionally qualified; otherwise, the performing contestant was eliminated if they failed to raise the wall. This continues until the two contestants with the lowest number of votes were eliminated. In this stage, each expert's vote added 5% to the total.

=== Super 13 (Mar. 4) ===
Order	Contestant	Song	Score	Expert Vote				Result
Order	Contestant	Song	Score	Judika	Rossa	Nazril Irham	Yovie Widianto	Result
1	Siti Rosalia	"Siapkah Kau Untuk Jatuh Cinta Lagi"	50%	No	No	No	No	Eliminated
2	Elvan Saragih	"Pada Satu Cinta"	76%	Yes	Yes	Yes	Yes	Safe
3	Salwa Jasmine	"Moving On"	55%	No	Yes	No	Yes	Safe
4	Logonta Tarigan	"New Light"	65%	No	Yes	No	Yes	Safe
5	Igan Andhika	"Seandainya"	72%	Yes	Yes	Yes	Yes	Safe
6	Angeline Victoria	"Selow"	61%	No	Yes	No	No	Safe
7	Mirriam Eka	"Somewhere Over the Rainbow"	83%	Yes	Yes	Yes	Yes	Safe
8	R&D	"Kugadaikan Cintaku"	81%	Yes	Yes	Yes	Yes	Safe
9	Jacqueline Caroline	"Shallow"	86%	Yes	Yes	Yes	Yes	Safe
10	Ayu Gurnita	"Butiran Debu"	73%	Yes	Yes	Yes	Yes	Safe
11	Yayang Caesar	"Aku Wanita"	51%	No	No	No	No	Eliminated
12	Salma Faradhila	"Diamonds"	78%	Yes	Yes	Yes	Yes	Safe
13	Vadhlil Amaya	"Haruskah Ku Mati"	55%	No	No	No	No	Safe

=== Super 11 (Mar. 11) ===
Rossa couldn't attend the live show and was replaced by Maia Estianty. For some reasons all finalists performed with the wall up.

Order	Contestant	Song	Score	Expert Vote				Result
Order	Contestant	Song	Score	Judika	Maia Estianty	Nazril Irham	Yovie Widianto	Result
1	Salma Faradhila	"Waktu yang Salah"	58%	No	Yes	No	Yes	Safe
2	Igan Andhika	"Kasmaran"	79%	Yes	Yes	Yes	Yes	Safe
3	Ayu Gurnita	"Cukup Tau"	54%	No	No	Yes	Yes	Eliminated
4	Angeline Victoria	"Everything I Need"	41%	No	No	No	No	Eliminated
5	Jacqueline Caroline	"thank u, next"	87%	Yes	Yes	Yes	Yes	Safe
6	Salwa Jasmine	"FRIENDS"	64%	Yes	Yes	Yes	No	Safe
7	R&D	"Kisah Romantis"	69%	Yes	No	Yes	Yes	Safe
8	Vadhlil Amaya	"Rude"	61%	No	No	Yes	No	Safe
9	Mirriam Eka	"Untuk Perempuan yang Sedang Dalam Pelukan"	59%	No	No	No	No	Safe
10	Elvan Saragih	"Can We Talk"	80%	Yes	Yes	Yes	Yes	Safe
11	Logonta Tarigan	"Fire on Fire"	86%	Yes	Yes	Yes	Yes	Safe

=== Super 9 (Mar. 18) ===
Order	Contestant	Song	Score	Expert Vote				Result
Order	Contestant	Song	Score	Judika	Rossa	Nazril Irham	Yovie Widianto	Result
1	Logonta Tarigan	"Better Now"	78%	Yes	Yes	Yes	Yes	Safe
2	R&D	"Rame Rame" / "Timur"	74%	Yes	Yes	Yes	Yes	Safe
3	Igan Andhika	"History"	81%	Yes	Yes	Yes	Yes	Safe
4	Mirriam Eka	"What a Wonderful World"	72%	Yes	Yes	Yes	Yes	Safe
5	Salma Faradhila	"Kiss and Make Up"	39%	No	No	No	No	Eliminated
6	Vadhlil Amaya	"How Am I Supposed to Live Without You"	63%	Yes	Yes	No	Yes	Eliminated
7	Elvan Saragih	"Love"	82%	Yes	Yes	Yes	Yes	Safe
8	Jacqueline Caroline	"Sorry Not Sorry"	88%	Yes	Yes	Yes	Yes	Safe
9	Salwa Jasmine	"Believer"	74%	Yes	Yes	Yes	Yes	Safe

=== Super 7 (Mar. 25) ===
Order	Contestant	Song	Score	Expert Vote				Result
Order	Contestant	Song	Score	Judika	Rossa	Nazril Irham	Yovie Widianto	Result
1	Elvan Saragih	"Jenuh"	82%	Yes	Yes	Yes	Yes	Safe
2	Igan Andhika	"One Call Away"	81%	Yes	Yes	Yes	Yes	Safe
3	Salwa Jasmine	"Finesse"	41%	No	Yes	No	No	Eliminated
4	R&D	"Long Train Runnin'"	70%	Yes	Yes	Yes	Yes	Safe
5	Logonta Tarigan	"Too Good at Goodbyes"	82%	Yes	Yes	Yes	Yes	Safe
6	Jacqueline Caroline	"Officially Missing You"	82%	Yes	Yes	Yes	Yes	Safe
7	Mirriam Eka	"Ijinkan Aku Menyayangimu"	64%	No	No	No	Yes	Eliminated

== Semi-final ==
=== Super 5 (Apr. 1) ===
Order	Contestant	Song	Score	Expert Vote				Result
Order	Contestant	Song	Score	Judika	Rossa	Nazril Irham	Yovie Widianto	Result
1	Igan Andhika	"Thinking Out Loud"	82%	Yes	Yes	Yes	Yes	Safe
2	R&D	"Diana"	69%	Yes	Yes	Yes	Yes	Eliminated
3	Elvan Saragih	"Pillowtalk"	82%	Yes	Yes	Yes	Yes	Safe
4	Jacqueline Caroline	"Tersiksa Lagi"	83%	Yes	Yes	Yes	Yes	Safe
5	Logonta Tarigan	"Malaikat Juga Tahu"	84%	Yes	Yes	Yes	Yes	Safe

== Elimination chart ==
Female	Male	Duo/Group	Winner	Runner-up

Safe	Eliminated	Highest Vote	Lowest Vote

Place	Contestant	4/3	11/3	18/3	25/3	1/4	8/4	
1	Elvan Saragih	76%	80%	82%	82%	82%	75%	84%
2	Logonta Tarigan	65%	86%	78%	82%	84%	79%	66%
3	Igan Andhika	72%	79%	81%	81%	82%	74%	Eliminated (Top 4)
4	Jacqueline Caroline	86%	87%	88%	82%	83%	72%	Eliminated (Top 4)
5	R&D	81%	69%	74%	70%	69%	Eliminated (Top 5)	
6	Mirriam Eka	83%	59%	72%	64%	Eliminated (Top 7)		
7	Salwa Jasmine	55%	64%	74%	41%	Eliminated (Top 7)		
8	Vadhlil Amaya	55%	61%	63%	Eliminated (Top 9)			
9	Salma Faradhila	78%	58%	39%	Eliminated (Top 9)			
10	Ayu Gurnita	73%	54%	Eliminated (Top 11)				
11	Angeline Victoria	61%	41%	Eliminated (Top 11)				
12	Yayang Caesar	51%	Eliminated (Top 13)					
13	Siti Rosalia	50%	Eliminated (Top 13)					
