= Rising Star (Greek TV series) =

- Genre: Reality television
- Presented by: Giorgos Liagas; Kalomoira (Backstage)
- Judges: Antonis Remos; Despina Vandi; Kostas Makedonas; Christos Mastoras
- Country of origin: Greece
- No. of seasons: 1
- No. of episodes: 19

Production
- Production locations: Athens, Kapa Studios
- Running time: 240 minutes
- Production company: Keshet

Original release
- Network: ANT1
- Release: December 12, 2016 – April 18, 2017

Rising Star (translated as Ανερχόμενο Αστέρι) is a Greek interactive reality singing competition, which was first broadcast on ANT1 from December 12, 2016. It is based on the Rising Star franchise created by Keshet Broadcasting.

== Format ==
=== Pre Audition ===
As the season begins, each contestant is asked to perform a well-known song in front of judges. After the performance, the judges vote on whether to advance the contestant to the televised audition stage. If the judges are undecided, the contestant may be asked to perform another song before a final decision is made, and then a decision is made. The judges selected 96 performances, three of which were duets. Radio station "Rythmos 94.9" organized a competition called "Rythmos Auditions". The winner of the "Rythmos Auditions" qualified to the live auditions. The official YouTube channel of ANT1 organized a competition called "YouTube Auditions". The winner was determined by the number of likes their video received and qualified to the live auditions. The total number of performances in the Live Auditions was 98.

=== Live Auditions ===
Acts are announced. Only 16 contestants in waiting get the chance of actually performing during the show that day. As a reportage of the randomly announced performer is shown, viewers are invited to register for voting for that specific act. As the candidate makes to the stage, the host has a very brief conversation with him/her. With a countdown of three seconds, the candidate has to start performing behind a screen called "The Wall". With start of performance, the voting kicks in. Registered voters have the option of voting just "yes" or "no". Non-votes are also considered "no" votes. If a panelist (excluding the host) votes "yes", another 7% is added to the tally of the contestant. The contestants also see random photos of voters in their favour. Faces of panelists voting "yes" will also be shown in much larger frames. Once the contestant reaches 70% of "Yes" votes, the wall is raised and the contestant goes to the next round of the competition.

=== Duels ===
Contestants who make it through the auditions are paired by the judges to face off in a duel. The first contestant to sing, sings with the wall up and sets the benchmark for the second contestant. The second contestant sings with the wall down. If the second contestant betters the first contestant's vote total, the wall rises and the second contestant is through to the next round while the first contestant is eliminated. If the second contestant fails to raise the wall, the second contestant is eliminated and the first contestant is through. The panelist of judges is 5%.

=== Duets ===
The rival teams in the duels are joined and the contestants of the two teams, are paired in a duet. The competition system is similar to with the duels. In the end of the live, the judges select four contestants to participate in the "Hot Seat" rounds. At this stage, do not vote the judges and vote only the world.

=== Hot Seat ===
In the first live of round "Hot Seat", the οpponents of the contestants is their groups identical. The first contestant sings with the wall up, the other contestants perform with the wall down. The contestants with the lowest score in every team, are eliminated. In the second, third and fourth live, the first contestant performs with the wall up and the other contestants sing with the wall down. The contestant with the worst score, is eliminated. In fifth live (Quarter-Final), the contestants with the worst score from every team they will perform for second time and the worst of the four contestants, is eliminated. Judges vote is 5%.

=== Semi-final & Final ===
In the Semi-Final, the contestants perform with the wall up. The semi-final divided in 2 rounds. The contestant with the highest vote in every round, qualifies automatically. In the end of the semi-final, the judges select the contestant who want to participate in the final. The vote panelist of judges is 5%. The winner was Giannis Xanthopoulos from the team of Christos Mastoras.
