= Dara Puspita =

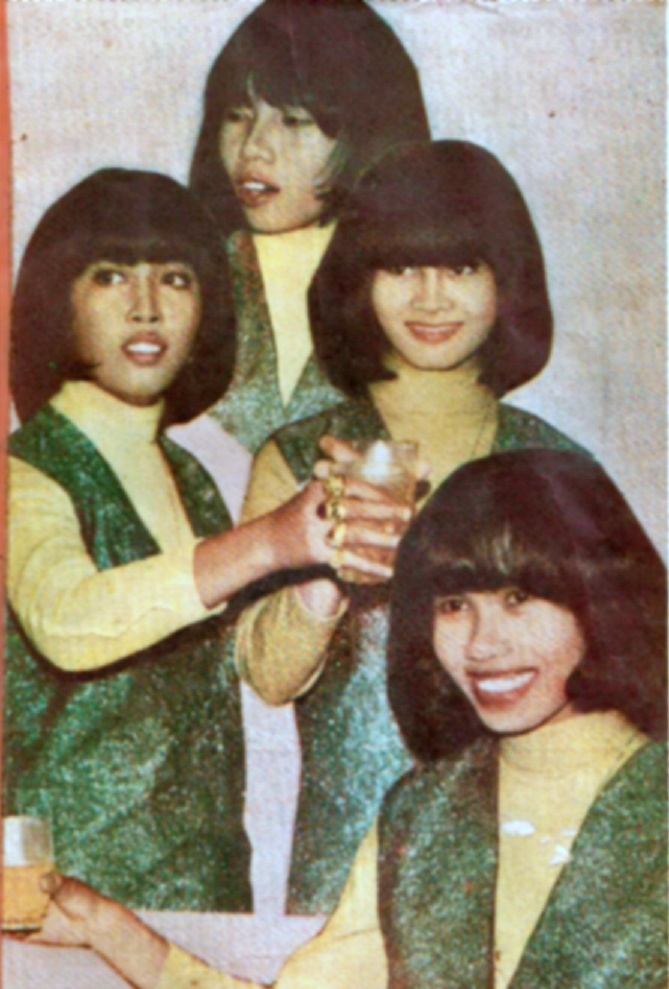
- Dara Puspita (Surabaya, 1964)

Background information
- Years active: 1964–1974, 2022
- Website: www.garagehangover.com/darapuspita/

Dara Puspita was an all-female rock group from Surabaya, Indonesia, formed in 1964. The band consisted of Titiek Adji Rachman (lead guitar), Susy Nander (drums), Lies Adji Rachman (rhythm guitar) and Titiek Hamzah (bass).

In 1956, lead guitarist Titiek Rachman (born 1943) formed a band called Nirma Puspita with thirteen girls. In 1958, Mus Mulyadi (lead guitar; 1945–2019), Noer Halimah (bass; born 1943) and Joyce Theresia Pamela Köhler (rhythm guitar; born 29 August 1945) joined the band while Titiek Rachman a took over as drummer and changed the name to Irama Puspita. In 1960, Lies Rachman (1945?–2023) a younger sister's Titiek on lead guitar while the three of them Titiek Rachman took over as bassist, Mus Mulyadi took over as lead singer and Noer Halimah took over as rhythm guitarist. The Rachman sisters were two of 10 children of Adjie Rachman, formerly a kroncong musician. In 1962, Joyce was fired from the band because she wanted to finish her schooling and form two music groups called Muda Ria and Visca Dara while also marrying Eddy Abdul Manaf, who was blessed with 3 children, including Ahmad Dhani, the frontman of Dewa 19. Not long after, Noer Halimah also resigned because she wanted to decide to enter her school and form two music groups called Muda Ria and Visca Dara as well as being a dangdut singer. When Titiek AR finally met Susy Nander joined as a new drummer to replace Joyce and Ani Kusuma joined as new lead guitarist to replace Lies, so Titiek AR took over as rhythm guitarist while Lies took over as bassist. However, as time went by, the personnel began to leave, so Mus Mulyadi disbanded the group he was coaching in 1963. Several members of Irama Puspita, namely Ani Kusuma, Susy Nander, and siblings Titiek and Lies Adji Rachman, decided to move to Jakarta and form their own group, even Titiek AR returned to the position of lead guitarist while Ani Kusuma was the rhythm guitarist. In addition, Ani Kusuma was the rhythm guitarist, and Susy Nander played drums. When Lies left the band for a month in 1964 to finish her education, she was replaced on bass by Titiek Hamzah (born 1949) since graduating from junior high school. When Lies returned, Ani Kusuma left the band, and Lies became the rhythm guitarist and changed the name to Dara Puspita.

The band faced pressure from the Sukarno regime, which saw rock music as an unwanted Western influence, going so far as to imprison the popular band Koes Bersaudara, and the band sought a safer place to play, performing live in Bangkok, and picking up some Thai influences in their music, including the song "Puyaili", a rock performance of a Thai folk song, as well as their own song "Pattaya Beach".

Following the collapse of the Sukarno government in 1965, the band's first LP, Jang Pertama ('the first') was released in 1966, the band released three further LPs in 1966 through 1968. These are in the garage rock genre.

In July 1968, the band left Indonesia, and toured Europe, including West Germany, Hungary, England, France, Belgium, the Netherlands, and Spain, touring for three years, before returning to Indonesia on 3 December 1971. Their time in Europe had resulted in only limited recordings, the singles "Welcome To My House/I Believe In Love", and "Ba Da Da Dum/Dream Stealer", which were not successful in Europe. By the time of their return, the years of touring had strained relationships within the band. However, demand for their music in Indonesia was high, and shows performed throughout Indonesia between December and their disbanding on 29 March 1972, were sold out, with as many as 23,000 spectators attending their shows.

After the group ended, only Titiek Hamzah continued in the music industry, releasing some solo albums.

Some of the band's recordings from 1966-1968 have been issued, on The Garage Years released in 2010, and 1966-1968 by Sublime Frequencies in 2010.

In 2022, they made a one-off reunion on Synchronize Fest in a concert billed "Spirit of Dara Puspita", performing with younger female bands. On 17 September 2023, Lies Adji Rachman died from complication of diabetes, at the age of 78.

== Discography ==
=== LPs ===
- 1965 - Jang Pertama (Mesra Records LP-4)
- 1966 - Dara Puspita a.k.a. Edisi 2 a.k.a. Special Edition (Mesra Records LP-6)
- 1967 - Green Green Grass (Mesra Records LP-13)
- 1967 - A Go Go (El Sinta A-6708)
- 1971 - Tabah dan cobalah (Indra AKL-045)
- 1973 - Dara Puspita Min Plus (Indra)
- 1974 - Pop Melayu Volume 1 (Remaco )

=== Singles and EPs ===
- Dara Puspita/Koes Bersaudara EP (Irama EPLN-2)
- "Welcome To My House" / "I Believe In Love"
- "Ba-Da-Da-Dum" / "Dream Stealer"
- "Surabaya" / "Cabaleuro" (Dutch single)
- "Mengapa;Lihatlah Adikku" / "Hai Dengarlah;Bertamasha"
- "Dara Puspita" (Bintang BT-107)
