= Tonny Koeswoyo =

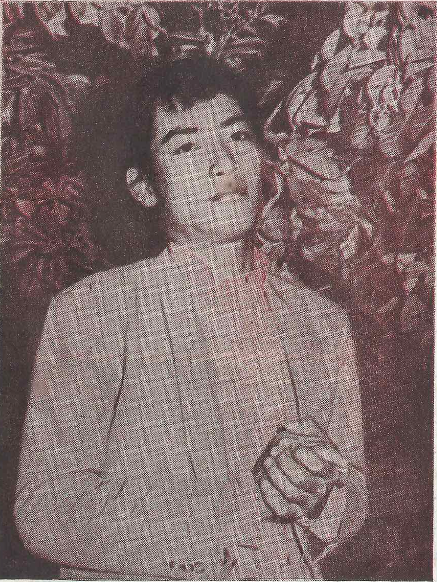

Background information
- Born: Koestono Koeswoyo; 19 January 1936; Tuban, Dutch East Indies
- Died: 27 March 1987 (aged 51) Jakarta, Indonesia
- Genres: Rock, pop
- Occupations: Musician, singer-songwriter, artist
- Instruments: Vocals, piano, guitar, keyboard
- Years active: 1962–1987

Koestono "Tonny" Koeswoyo (19 January 1936 – 27 March 1987) was an Indonesian rock musician and leader of the music group Koes Plus. Koeswoyo played piano, guitar and keyboard.
