= Rising Star Indonesia Dangdut season 1 =

Season of television series

Rising Star Indonesia Dangdut
- Season 1
- Hosted by: Indra Herlambang; Astrid Tiar
- Judges: Ayu Ting Ting; Ivan Gunawan; Iyeth Bustami; Pasha Ungu; Danang Pradana Dieva; Nella Kharisma; Denny Caknan; Judika; Anji; Hetty Koes Endang
- Winner: Rezki Ramdani
- Runner-up: Nayunda Nabila Nizrinah

Release
- Original network: MNCTV
- Original release: 19 April – 30 August 2021

The first season of Rising Star Indonesia Dangdut aired weekly on MNCTV starting 19 April 2021. The panel of judges consisted of Ayu Ting Ting, Ivan Gunawan, Iyeth Bustami, Pasha Ungu, Danang Pradana Dieva, Anji, Nella Kharisma, Denny Caknan, and Judika. Indra Herlambang and Astrid Tiar were appointed as hosts. The show was produced by MNCTV in-house production. The season was won by Rezki Ramdani who received 85 percent votes in the final round.

== Online auditions ==
On 6 March 2021, it was announced that Rising Star Indonesia Dangdut would hold online auditions through RCTI+ app until 27 March 2021. There were no regional auditions held because of the COVID-19 pandemic.

== Live auditions ==
=== Live Test (27 April 2021) ===
Order	Contestant	Song	Percentage	Expert Choices				
Order	Contestant	Song	Percentage	Ivan Gunawan	Pasha Ungu	Ayu Ting Ting	Iyeth Bustami	Danang Pradana Dieva
1	Happy Asmara	"Setangkai Bunga Padi" - Elvy Sukaesih	85%					
