= Kimmy Jayanti =

Indonesian model and actress

- Born: October 18, 1991 (age 34); Medan, North Sumatera, Indonesia
- Occupations: Celebrity, Model
- Years active: 2010 - present
- Spouse: Greg Nwokolo
- Children: Kimberly Akira Gregory, Saint Dominic Gregory
- Parents: S. Jaya Krisna (father); Jayakumari (mother)
- Website: https://kimmyjayanti.com/

Kimmy Jayanti (born 18 October 1991) is an Indonesian model and actress of Indian descent who began her career acting in I Know What You Did on Facebook.

== Biography ==
Jayanti was born on 18 October 1991 at Medan, North Sumatera to father S. Jaya Krisna and mother Jayakumari. In 2007, when she was 16 years old, Jayanti moved to Jakarta to start her modeling career. There, she signed up for Look.Inc, a famous modeling agency.

Jayanti acted in the movie, I Know What You Did on Facebook. This resulted in her nomination in the 2010 Indonesian Film Festival and the 2011 Indonesian Movie Actors Awards.

Jayanti opened her own modeling school, Kimmy Jayanti School, on 3 January 2016, in Jakarta.

Jayanti married Indonesian footballer, Greg Nwokolo, at Perth, Australia, on 5 May 2018, when she was 26. A couple of months into their marriage, Jayanti was notified pregnant and gave birth to her first daughter, Kimberly Akira Gregory on 11 July 2019. Her first son, Saint Dominic Gregory, was born 2 years later, on 11 January 2021. Jayanti stated that she the named him Saint Dominic because Saint meant holy and Dominic means God.

== Model video clip ==
- Maliq & D'Essentials - Terlalu (2010)

== Advertisements ==
Year	Name	Ref.
2015	Samsung Galaxy A5	
2017	Samsung Galaxy A8	

== Filmography ==
=== Films ===
Year	Title	Role	Ref.
2010	I Know What You Did on Facebook	Via	
2014	Guardian	Bianca	
2015	Sunshine Becomes You	Dee Black	

=== TV shows ===
Year	TV show	TV network	Role	Ref.
2013 - 2018	iLook	NET TV	Model Presenter	
2014	Rising Star Indonesia	RCTI	Presenter	
2022 - 2023	Indonesia's Next Top Model (season 3)	NET TV	Guest Judge and Model Mentor	

== Achievements ==
Year	Award	Category	Nominated work	Result	Ref.
2010	Indonesian Film Festival	Best Woman Supporting Role	I Know What You Did on Facebook	Nominated	
2011	Indonesian Movie Actors Awards	Best New Actress	I Know What You Did on Facebook	Nominated	
2011	Indonesian Movie Actors Awards	Favorite Newcomer Actress	I Know What You Did on Facebook	Nominated	
