= Indah Nevertari =

Indonesian singer (born 1992)

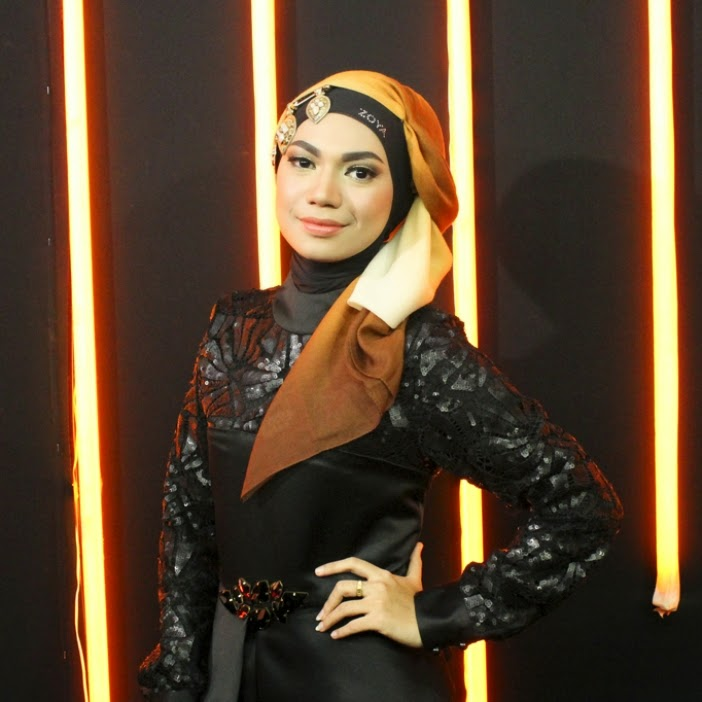

Background information
- Born: Indah Nevertari; 11 May 1992 (age 34); Medan, North Sumatra, Indonesia
- Genres: Pop, R&B, Reggae, Hip hop, Latin pop, Middle-Eastern
- Occupation: Singer
- Years active: 2014–present
- Labels: Warner Music Indonesia (2014–2017); Athena Jaya Production (2018–present)

Indah Nevertari (born 11 May 1992) is an Indonesian singer. She is known as the winner of first season of Rising Star Indonesia, a singing competition based on the Israeli series HaKokhav HaBa, which was broadcast on RCTI in 2014.

== Life and career ==
=== 1992–2013 : Childhood and early career ===
Indah Nevertari born in Medan on 11 May 1992. She is the youngest daughter of Mukmil Dumairi and Huriyah Lubis, both teachers. She has one brother and four older sisters. All of her siblings have as first name 'Emil' except Indah. Initially her full name not Indah Nevertari, but Indah Hazizul Aini. Then it was changed to become Indah Nevertari when 1st grade because of her mother wishes. Emillia Syafrina is the oldest sister. Together with Emilza Mardiyah, the next sister, they are Indah's manager. Emilla Zola is third followed by Emil Idham her brother. Emilda Khairunisa, her fourth sister, now works as a civil servant in one of the government agencies in Aceh. Since childhood, Indah love and is good at singing Indian songs. That's because she is often invited by her brother.to watch Indian films. One of her favorite song was "Kuch Kuch Hota Hai" known by the film she watch. She has participated in various les vocals and competitions since her 6th grade. Indah completed primary education in Taman Siswa elementary school Medan, then continued her education at Taman Siswa junior and Senior high school Medan. Indah finish higher education in North Sumatra Muhammadiyah University majoring in accounting with a Bachelor of Economics. Right from the beginning of this lecture she decided to wear the hijab.

In 2013 Indah took part in the talent show Indonesian Idol eighth season Medan audition by singing a song Man Down belongs to Rihanna. She got a golden ticket and qualify for the final elimination contest in Jakarta. She was eliminated in the first performance. But due to this contest she began to be known by the public. That's when Indah fan club named " ineversal " was born. Indah herself inaugurated the name " ineversal " on 1 February 2014. Indonesian Idol audition video has been viewed more than 3 million times. Indah also took part in the LA Meet Labels Medan in 2012 organized by LA Lights by singing " Terbaikkah Untukku" which is her single and the song " Something's Got A Hold on Me " as well. That song is from Christina Aguilera In addition, in the talk show of hitam putih Trans7 hosted by Deddy Corbuzier on 13 January 2015, Indah said that she had attended talent shows other than the Rising Star Indonesia and Indonesian Idol, namely Indonesia's Got Talent and X Factor Indonesia. She again didn't succeed in qualifying. At the occasion of the X Factor auditions in Medan, Indah formed a vocal group with three of her girlfriends. They named themselves " Four Stars ". This group qualified for the audition in Jakarta by the main judges, Ahmad Dhani, Bebi Romeo, Rossa, and Anggun. But before auditioning in Jakarta, Indah resigned from the group for some reason. So the group auditioned in Jakarta without Indah and they didn't qualify. Before following a talent show on television and solo career, Indah had joined in an indie band from Medan " Bionic Band " as a vocalist and issued a single entitled " Semua Ini Untukmu " with the band.

=== 2014: Rising Star Indonesia ===
==== Rising Star Indonesia: Gangsta and Kat Dahlia ====
After Indah's failure at the Indonesian Idol season 8, in 2014 Indah participated in the Rising Star Indonesia contest which was aired also by RCTI television station. She performed the song " Gangsta " rap singer's from Kat Dahlia of the United States. At half time of the contest Indah already got 93% of votings. Kat Dahlia immediately valued her singing via Twitter. By the Rising Star Indonesia event Indah had the opportunity to speak directly to Kat Dahlia and she is dreaming of dueting once with her. On Friday, 19 December 2014 the final round took place. By singing "Animals" (Maroon 5), "Man Down" (Rihanna) and "Come N Love Me", Indah became the champion of Rising Star Indonesia first season. It was mainly by the last song that Indah bore the palm.

==== The Winner of Rising Star Indonesia ====
Final Round Rising Star Indonesia held on 19 December 2014. In This round Rossa, as a guest expert, assists the judging panel Bebi Romeo, Ahmad Dhani and Judika and they present Danish rock band Michael Learns to Rock as a guest star. Unlike the other contests with two finalists at the end of the competition, the Rising Star Indonesia retains four finalists competing for the first prize. Indah, Hanin Dhiya, Ghaitsa Kenang and Bluesmates band made it through to the grand final. This round is divided into three stages. At each stage, the winner had to get the highest vote to beat other finalists. In the first stage, Bluesmates got the lowest voting and failed to get into the next stage Ghaitsa was the next to miss the needed votes to get to the next stage. In the final round, Indah and Hanin must compete to get the highest voting. By singing the song "Animals" (Maroon 5) in the first round, then "Man Down" (Rihanna) and finally "Come N Love Me" at the end of the round, Indah got the highest number of votes and became the champion of the first season Rising Star Indonesia. It was mainly by the last song that Indah was victorious.

After winning the Rising Star Indonesia, on 21 December 2014, Indah appeared first in the city of Makassar to entertain thousands of employees in a series of anniversary BRI to 119 in Mal GTC Makassar. She sang Cindai, Nirmala, Bang Bang, and Gangsta. The next day on 22 December 2014, for the first time, she performed at the dahsyat RCTI and brought her debut single "Come N Love Me". On New Year's Eve, 31 December 2014, Indah was invited by the mayor of Medan for a show in order to enliven the New Year's Eve in Pematangsiantar, Medan. She entertained the field by singing Bang Bang, Gangsta, and Nirmala.

==== Performances on Rising Star Indonesia ====
– The Performance got highest voting among all contestants
– The Performance is Not Safe

Theme	Song	Original Singer	Order	voting result	Information
Live Audition 4	"Gangsta"	Kat Dahlia	4	93%	Through to duel phase
Live Duels 3	"Eyes on Me"	Celine Dion	2	70%	Through to final duel phase
Final Duels 2	"Show Me"	Bruno Mars	4	91%	Through to Big 14 phase
Best 14	"All About That Bass"	Meghan Trainor	6	87%	Safe
Top 12	"Bad Girl"	Agnez Mo	5	89%	Safe
Winning 11	"Buttons"	The Pussycat Dolls	7	92%	Safe
Big 10	"Treat Her Like a Lady"	Celine Dion Feat Diana King	8	92%	Safe & highest voting
Super 9	"Rehab"	Amy Winehouse	6	92%	Safe & highest voting
Great 8	"You Da One"	Rihanna	4	91%	Safe
Lucky 7	"Nirmala"	Siti Nurhaliza	6	92%	Safe & highest voting
Semi-final Best of 6	"Di Belakangku"	Peterpan	5	73%	Not Safe
The Bottom Performances Semi-final Best of 6	"Ain't No Other Man"	Christina Aguilera	4	89%	Through to Semi-final Best of 5 phase
Semi-final Best of 5	"Cindai"	Siti Nurhaliza	5	89.07%	Not safe
The Bottom Performances Semi-final Best of 5	"Bang Bang"	Jessie J, Ariana Grande, dan Nicki Minaj	4	93%	Through to grand final
1st round Grand Final	"Animals"	Maroon 5	3	88%	Through to grand final 2nd round
2nd round Grand Final	"Man Down"	Rihanna	3	81%	Through to grand final 3rd round
3rd round Grand Final	"Come N Love Me"	Indah Nevertari	2	81%	Winner

==== Others Performances on Rising Star Indonesia ====
Theme	Song	Original Singer	Information
Rising Star Indonesia By Request	"Coke Bottle"	Agnez Mo	Song request by fans
Rising Star Indonesia By Request	"Rude Boy"	Rihanna	Song request by fans
Rising Star Indonesia By Request	"I Turn to You"	Christina Aguilera	Song request by fans
Opening Grand Final	"Shy Guy"	Diana King	Medley with other contestant

=== 2015–present ===
In early 2015, Indah visited Medan Denai sub-district office and the mayor's office in Medan to thank them for their support in the Rising Star Indonesia contest. She admitted that it was also by their help that she could be a winner. On 13 January 2015, Indah was invited to the talk show hitam putih trans7 which was hosted by Deddy Corbuzier. In the event Indah said that she had attended other contests besides Rising Star Indonesia and Indonesian Idol, namely Indonesia's Got Talent and X Factor Indonesia. She did not qualify. On 23 January 2015, Indah as a guest at dahsyatnya Awards RCTI duet with X Factor Indonesia's first season winner, Fatin Shidqia with the song "Problem" by Ariana Grande. After winning the Rising Star Indonesia, Indah had a busy schedule on air and off air. On 7 February 2015, Indah was the guest star in the party declaration Perindo event held in JIEXPO Kemayoran, together with Ayu Ting Ting, Virzha Idol, and Mike Mohede. After failing in Indonesian Idol season 8, on 14 February 2015, Indah was guest star in the show Indonesian Idol Junior and dueted with Vitara with the song "Impossible" from Shontelle. Additionally Indah also collaborates with Jojo and Rian. They sang "Nirmala" a song of the Rising Star Indonesia contest. On 6 March 2015, Indah appear in a concert entitled "World Mega Concert" organized by RCTI with the main star Christina Perri. In this event, Indah sang the single "Come N Love Me" remix version featuring DJ Indyana & DJ Yasmin. After a leave college because she wanted to focus on singing, on 8 April 2015, officially Indah graduated from North Sumatra Muhammadiyah University with a Bachelor of Economics.

On 26 May 2015, Warner Music Indonesia released Indah's religious song on iTunes. The song is titled "Dua Pertiga Malam" created by renowned composer Dwiki Dharmawan. The next day on 27 May 2015, Music Video Come N Love Me was released on Warner Music Indonesia YouTube Channel. Music Video is the result of cooperation between Warner Music with renowned hijab product Zoya. Even Zoya held a quiz to find a model of the music video. Quiz winners participate in making a video clip in Singapore. On 14 August 2015, Warner Music Indonesia released the single recycling Rinto Harahap creation entitled "Biarlah Sendiri". The single will be on the album Tribute To Rinto Harahap along with other singers. On 22 September 2015, Indah appear on reader nominations Ami Awards as well as a duet with the band performers Republik. On 30 November 2015, Indah guest star in the show entitled Music of the Day on RCTI television station with Harris J.

On 13 January 2016, Indah released her fourth single titled Rabbana. The single is also the main soundtrack for the film Ketika Mas Gagah Pergi. This song is the created by Rizki Awan and Dwiki Dharmawan as musical arranger. Not only Dwiki, this song also involves the origin of Prague Czech Symphony Orchestra to give bandage beautiful orchestral arrangements and majestic. Recording his own music performed in Paris, while the vocal take in the studio of Dwiki Dharmawan. Rabbana single release along with the release of a video clip of the song. Unlike the previous singles, for the single Rabbana, Indah hold press conferences at the office of Warner Music Indonesia. Indah currently is preparing to debut her first album which will be released in 2016 under the label Warner Music Indonesia.

== Discography ==
=== Compilation albums ===
Title	Album details
Songs from Rising Star	Released: 21 August 2015; Label: Warner Music Indonesia; Format: digital download

Title	Album details
Album Religi Terbaik	Released: May 2017; Label: Warner Music Indonesia; Format: CD

Title	Album details
25 Senandung Islami	Released: 26 May 2017; Label: Warner Music Indonesia; Format: digital download

=== Single ===
Year	Title	Album
2014	"Come N Love Me"	Songs from Rising Star
2015	"Dua Pertiga Malam"	25 Senandung Islami
2015	"Biarlah Sendiri"	Single
2016	"Rabbana"	Album Religi Terbaik
2016	"PHP"	Single
2017	"Kamu Tak Punya Hati"	Single
2018	"Marhaban Ramadhan"	Single

== TV Program ==
Year	Title	Role	Network
2014	Indonesian Idol Season 8	Herself – Contestant	RCTI
2014	Rising Star Indonesia	Herself – Contestant	RCTI
2017	"Hijab Traveler"	Herself – Host	Trans TV

== TV Commercial ==
Year	Title	Role
2015	"ZOYA My True Friends"	Herself with Laudya Cynthia Bella & Ivan Gunawan
2016	"ZOYA Cantik, Nyaman, Halal"	Herself with Zee Zee Shahab & Dhini Aminarti

== Awards and nominations ==
=== Anugerah Musik Indonesia ===
The Anugerah Musik Indonesia (English translation: Indonesian Music Awards), is an annual Indonesian major music awards. They have been compared to the American Grammy Awards and British Brit Awards. The award was formalized in 1997 by ASIRI (Association of Indonesia Recording Industry), PAPPRI (Association of Indonesian Singers, Songwriters and Music Record Producers), and KCI (Copyright Office of Indonesia).

Year	Nominee / work	Award	Result
2016	"Rabbana"	Best Religious Song Production Work	Nominated
2017	"PHP"	Best Electronic Dance Production Work	Nominated

=== Dahsyatnya Awards ===
The Dahsyatnya Awards are annual awards presented by the daily Indonesian TV show Dahsyat that airs on RCTI

Year	Recipient/Nominated work	Award	Result
2016	Indah Nevertari	Outstanding Newcomer	Nominated

=== Putar Film Awards ===
Year	Recipient/Nominated work	Award	Result
2016	Rabbana	Best Islamic Soundtrack	Won

Preceded by	Rising Star Indonesia; Winner; 2014	Succeeded by Andmesh Kamaleng
