= Koes Plus =

Indonesian musical group

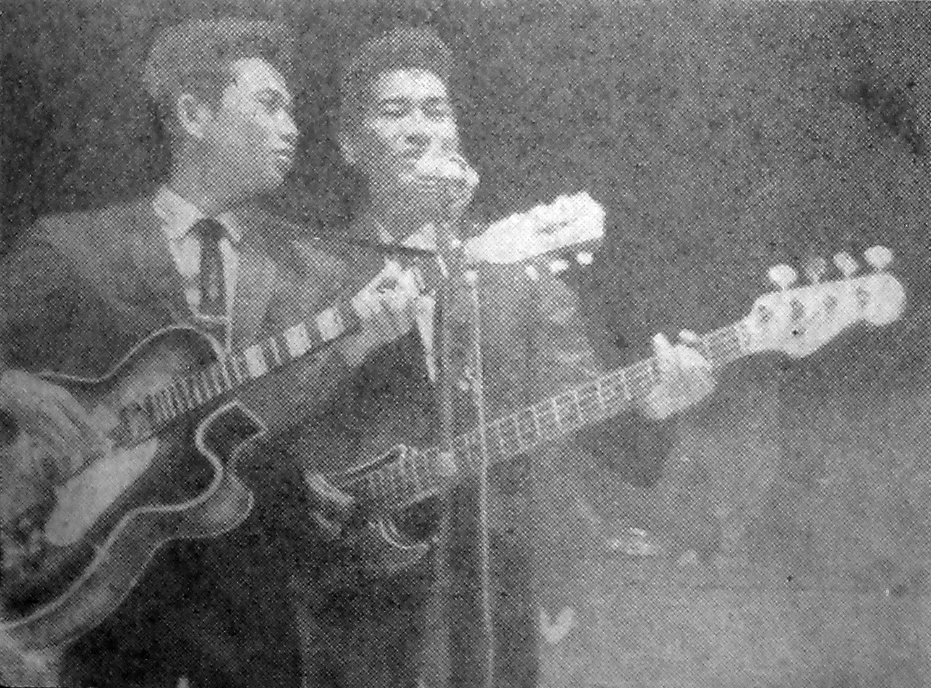
- Koes Bersaudara, 1963

Background information
- Origin: Tuban, East Java, Indonesia
- Genres: Rock, Pop
- Years active: 1958–1969 (as Koes Bersaudara), 1969–2018 (as Koes Plus)
- Past members: Yon Koeswoyo; John Koeswoyo; Tonny Koeswoyo; Kasmuri (Murry); Yok Koeswoyo; Nomo Koeswoyo; Totok Adji Rachman (Totok A.R.); Abadi Soesman; Deddy Dores; Jelly Tobing; Bambang Tondo; Najib Usman; Damon Koeswoyo; Hans Joko; Andolin Sibuea; Jack Kashbie; Danang; Soni; Seno; Acil

Koes Plus, formerly Koes Bersaudara (Koes Brothers), was an Indonesian musical group that was successful in the 1960s and 1970s. Known as one of Indonesia's classic musical acts, the band peaked in popularity in the days far before the advent of private television companies, delivering stripped-down pop and rock songs at the then-only TV station, TVRI.

In 2007, the Rolling Stone Indonesia magazine placed 6 of the band's studio albums on their 150 Greatest Indonesian Albums of All Time list. Those being Dheg Dheg Plas (1969) at number 4, To The So Called The Guilties (1967) at number 6, Koes Bersaudara (1964) at number 14, Koes Plus Volume 2 (1970) at number 21, Koes Plus Volume 4 (1971) at number 30, and Koes Plus Volume 5 (1971) at number 38.

In addition, the Rolling Stone put 10 of the band's songs on the 150 Greatest Indonesian Songs of All Time list. The songs are "Bis Sekolah" (1964) at number 4, "Kembali Ke Jakarta" (1969) at number 6, "Nusantara I" (1971) at number 19, "Kolam Susu" (1973) at number 31, "Bunga Di Tepi Jalan" (1971) at number 80, "Kelelawar" (1969) at number 83, "Manis dan Sayang" (1969) at number 88, "Pelangi" (1972) at number 92, "Jemu" (1975) at number 100 and "Di Dalam Bui" (1967) at number 126.

== History ==
=== Early days and controversy ===
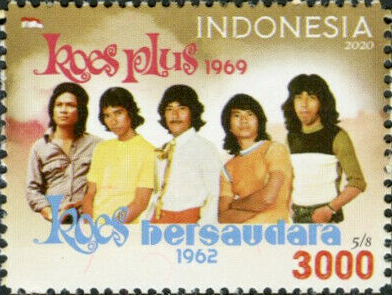
Koes Plus/Koes Bersaudara on a 2020 stamp of Indonesia

Hailing from the Bojonegoro-Tuban area in East Java, the band started out as Koes Bersaudara (Koes Brothers), initially consisting of all five Koeswoyo brothers: John Koeswoyo, Yok Koeswoyo, Yon Koeswoyo, Nomo Koeswoyo and Tonny Koeswoyo. Its antics of pioneering Beatles-influenced rock and roll subculture in Indonesia proved to be controversial. Such subcultures had been banned by President Sukarno in the early 1960s, and in 1965 the brothers were arrested by the Highest Operation Commando (KOTI) for performing covers of Beatles songs. They were eventually released just the day preceding the nation's coup d'état, on 29 September. This experience resulted in their song "Di Dalam Bui".

=== Koes Plus ===
When drummer Nomo quit in 1969, Murry was invited to fill the niche, but the decision caused an internal uproar as the band was initially projected as a family act. The feud was resolved by rebaptizing the band as Koes Plus. It consisted of the Koeswoyos plus an outsider; hence the name. Music historians have hypothesized that it was Murry's heavy drumming which led to the band incorporating rock tunes within their generally ballad-heavy albums.

Koes Plus' early days were rugged, as record companies insisted on rejecting them. Murry became frustrated at some point and temporarily quit the band, distributing their records freely as well as joining several other acts. Not until their songs were played on the state radio network did they gain considerable fame.

=== Present ===
Koes Plus never owned any legal rights pertaining to their works; they received only flat payment of approximately 3 million rupiahs for each album they recorded. While this meant that their record label was willing to produce a huge number of albums by Koes Plus due to the small investment involved, it also meant that the band never enjoyed any form of royalties whenever their works are being reproduced.

== Discography ==
=== Koes Bersaudara albums ===
1962

1. Dara Manisku;Jangan Bersedih/Dewi Rindu;Si Kancil (Irama)
2. Selamat Berpisah/Selalu (Irama)
3. Harapanku / Kuduslah Tjintamu (7") (Irama NP-31)

1964

1. Pagi Yang Indah/Oh Kau Tahu (Irama)
2. Angin Laut/Aku Rindukan Kasihmu (7") (Irama NP-33)
3. Selalu / Awan Putih (7") (Irama NP-34)
4. Bis Sekolah / Gadis Puri (7") (Irama NP-35)
5. Aku Rindu / Sendja (7") (Irama NP-36)
6. Kus Bersaudara (Dari Berpita;Untuk Ibu/Bintang Ketjil;Dipantai Bali)(Irama EP-61)
7. Meraju Kalbu (Oh Kau Tahu;Pagi Yang Indah/Aku Rindu;Awan Putih)(EP)
8. Angin Laut;Aku Rindukan Kasihmu/Bis Sekolah Gadis Puri (EP)
9. Angin Laut (Koes Bersauadra 1962–1964) (LP) (Dara Manisku; Djangan Bersedih; Harapanku; Dewi Rindu; Bis Sekolah; Pagi Jang Indah/Si Kantjil; Oh Kau Tau; Telanga Sunji; Angin Laut; Sendja; Selamat Berpisah)(Irama LPI 17573)

1967

1. To The So Called "The Guilties" (Mesra)
2. Djadikan Aku Domba Mu (Mesra MP-41)
3. Dara Puspita / Kus Bersaudara – Pesta Pak Lurah;Halo Halo (Dara Puspita)/Ami;Senandung Malam Hari (Kus Bersaudara) EP) Irama EPLN-2)

1977

1. Koes Bersaudara Kembali (Remaco)

1986

1. Koes Bersaudara 86 Lagi Lagi Kamu

1987

1. Koes Bersaudara 87 Kau Datang Lagi
2. Koes Bersaudara 87 Pop Jawa
3. Koes Bersaudara 87 Pop Anak – Anak
4. Koes Bersaudara 87 Happy Birthday
5. Koes Bersaudara 87 Bossas
6. Koes Bersaudara 87 Pop Batak

1988

1. Koes Bersaudara 88 Country Pop

2000

1. Koes Bersaudara Pop Batak Vol. 2
2. Koes Bersaudara Pop Jawa

=== Koes Plus albums ===
1969

1. Dheg Dheg Plas (Melody. LP-23)

1970

1. Natal bersama Koes Plus (EP) (Mesra. EP-97)
2. Koes Plus Volume 2 (Mesra. LP-44)

1971

1. Koes Plus Volume 3 (Mesra. LP-48)

1972

1. Koes Plus Volume 4 Bunga Di Tepi Jalan (Mesra. LP-50)
2. Koes Plus Volume 5 (Mesra. LP-51)

1973

1. Koes Plus Volume 6 (Mesra. LP-60)
2. Koes Plus Volume 7 (Mesra. LP-65)
3. Koes Plus Volume 8 (Remaco. RLL-187)
4. Koes Plus Volume 9 (Remaco. RLL-208)
5. Christmas Song (Remaco. RLL-210)

1974

1. Koes Plus Volume 10 (Remaco. RLL-209)
2. Koes Plus Volume 11 (Remaco. RLL-301)
3. Koes Plus Volume 12 (Remaco. RLL-302)
4. Koes Plus Qasidah Volume 1 (Remaco. RLL-341)
5. Natal bersama Koes Plus (LP) (Remaco. RLL-342)
6. Koes Plus The Best of Koes
7. Koes Plus Pop Anak-Anak Volume 1 (Remaco. RLL-306)
8. Koes Plus Another Song For You (Remaco. RLL-348)
9. Koes Plus Pop Melayu Volume 1 (Remaco. RLL-314)
10. Koes Plus Pop Melayu Volume 2 (Remaco. RLL-347)
11. Koes Plus Pop Jawa Volume 1 (Remaco. RLL-248)
12. Koes Plus Pop Jawa Volume 2 (Remaco. RLL-311)
13. Koes Plus Pop Keroncong Volume 1 (Remaco. RLL-299)
14. Koes Plus Pop Keroncong Volume 2 (Remaco. RLL-300)
15. Koes Plus Volume 8 (Instrumental) (Remaco. RLL-293)
16. Koes Plus Volume 9 (Instrumental) (Remaco. RLL-294)
17. Koes Plus Volume 10 (Instrumental) (Remaco. RLL-313)
18. Koes Plus Volume 11 (Instrumental) (Remaco. RLL-327)
19. Koes Plus The Best of Koes (Instrumental) (Remaco. RLL-320)
20. Koes Plus Pop Jawa Vol 1 (Instrumental)
21. Koes Plus Pop Jawa Vol 2 (Instrumental)
22. Koes Plus Pop Melayu Volume 1 (Instrumental)
23. Koes Plus Pop Keroncong Volume 1 (Instrumental)

1975

1. Koes Plus Volume 13 (Remaco. RLL-303)
2. Koes Plus Volume 14 (Remaco. RLL-631)
3. Koes Plus Selalu Dihatiku (Remaco. RLL-468)
4. Koes Plus Pop Anak-Anak Volume 2 (Remaco. RLL-448)
5. Koes Plus Pop Melayu Volume 3 (Remaco. RLL-390)
6. Koes Plus Pop Jawa Volume 3
7. Koes Plus Pop Melayu Volume 2 (Instrumental)

1976

1. Koes Plus in Concert (Remaco. RLL-635)
2. Koes Plus History of Koes Brothers (Remaco. RLL-715)
3. Koes Plus in Hard Beat Volume 1 (Remaco. RLL-717)
4. Koes Plus in Hard Beat Volume 2 (Remaco. RLL-768)
5. Koes Plus in Folk Song Volume 1 (Remaco. RLL-)
6. Koes Plus Pop Melayu Volume 4 (Remaco. RLL-730)
7. Koes Plus Pop Keroncong Volume 3 (Remaco. RLL-388)
8. Koes Plus Pop Jawa Melayu (Remaco. RLL-633)
9. Koes Plus Volume 12 (Instrumental)

1977

1. Koes Plus Pop Jawa Volume 4

1978

1. Koes Plus 78 Bersama Lagi (Purnama. PLL-2061)
2. Koes Plus 78 Melati Biru (Purnama. PLL-2077)
3. Koes Plus 78 Pop Melayu Cubit-Cubitan (Purnama. PLL-3055)

1979

1. Koes Plus 79 Melepas Kerinduan (Purnama. PLL-323)
2. Koes Plus 79 Berjumpa Lagi (Purnama. PLL-3040)
3. Koes Plus 79 Aku Dan Kekasihku (Purnama. PLL-4022)
4. Koes Plus 79 Pop Melayu Angin Bertiup (Purnama. PLL-4009)

1980

1. Koes Plus 80 Jeritan Hati (Remaco. PLL-4044)

1981

1. Koes Plus 81 Sederhana Bersamamu (Purnama. PLL-5091)
2. Koes Plus 81 Asmara
3. Koes Plus Medley 13 Tahun Karya Koes Plus
4. Koes Plus 81 Pop Melayu Oke Boss
5. Koes Plus Medley Dangdut 13 Tahun Karya Koes Plus
6. Koes Plus 81 Pop Keroncong

1982

1. Koes Plus 82 Koperasi Nusantara

1983

1. Koes Plus 83 Da Da Da
2. Koes Plus Re-Arrange I & II
3. Koes Bersaudara Plus Garuda Pancasila

1984

1. Koes Plus 84 Angin Senja & Geladak Hitam
2. Koes Plus 84 Palapa
3. Koes Plus Pop Memble 84 (Puspita Record)
4. Koes Plus Album Nostalgia Platinum 1
5. Koes Plus Album Nostalgia Platinum 2
6. Koes Plus Album Nostalgia Platinum (Instrumental)

1985

1. Koes Plus 85 Ganja Kelabu

1987

1. Koes Plus 87 Cinta Di Balik Kota
2. Koes Plus 87 Lembah Derita
3. Milik Illahi
4. Koes Plus "AIDS"

1988

1. Koes Plus 88 Jumpa Pertama
2. Koes Plus 88 Sakit

1989

1. Koes Plus 89 Nasib

1990

1. Koes Plus "Reuni"
2. Koes Plus Kidung Jawa "Pit Kopat Kapit"

1991

1. Koes Plus 91 Asam Di Gunung Garam Di Laut
2. Koes Plus Dangdut 91 Amelinda
3. Koes Plus Reggae

1993

1. Koes Plus 93 Mata Bertemu Mata
2. Koes Plus 93 Sedih
3. Koes Plus Ultimate Collection Vol. 1 (Bravo Musik)
4. Koes Plus Ultimate Collection Vol. 2 (Bravo Musik)
5. Koes Plus Ultimate Collection Vol. 3 (Bravo Musik)

1994

1. Koes Plus "Tak Usah Kau Sesali"

1995

1. Koes Plus 95 Pantun Berkait

1996

1. Koes Plus Pop Melayu Putus Cinta (Bravo Musik)
2. Koes Plus Kasih 96 (Bravo Musik)
3. Koes Plus House Music 96

1997

1. Koes Plus Dores Rindu Kamu (Deddy Dores)

1998

1. Koes Plus & Koes Bersaudara Disco House Music
2. Koes Plus 98 Nusantara 2000
3. Koes Plus Akustik
4. Koes Plus 98 Takdir Kehidupanku

1999

1. Koes Plus Pop Keroncong Abadi
2. Koes Plus Burung Dara (Ian Antono)
3. Koes Plus Back To Basic
4. Koes Plus Love Song Koes Plus (Billy J. Budiardjo)

2006

1. Melaut Bersama Koes Plus

2009

1. Koes Plus Pembaharuan Song Of Porong

2011

1. Koes Plus Pembaharuan "Curiga"

== See also ==
- List of Indonesian rock bands
