= Boy William =

Indonesian actor (born 1991)

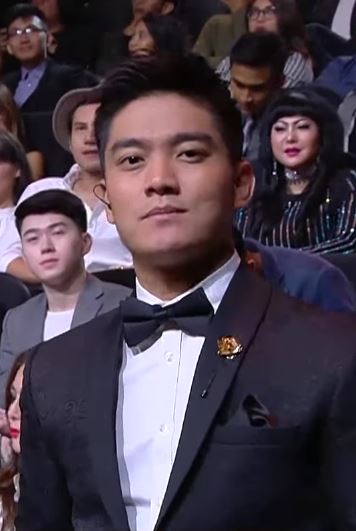
- Boy William in 2017
- Born: William Hartanto; 17 October 1991 (age 34); Jakarta, Indonesia
- Occupations: VJ; presenter; rapper; actor; singer-songwriter; producer
- Years active: 2009 - present
- Height: 175 cm (5 ft 9 in)

William Hartanto (born 17 October 1991), known professionally as Boy William, is an Indonesian entertainer.

== Biography ==
Born William Hartanto in Indonesia, he lived in New Zealand for two years. William loved music as a student at school. His religion is Christian.

William started his first career by winning the Starteen model election in 2009, where he showed his talent for dancing the Haka Dance. He represented his school in the Haka Dance Competition in Africa for one month. William switched to becoming a video jockey on MTV Indonesia. He also had leading roles in the films Di Balik 98 and Sunshine Becomes You. William is also a presenter Breakout on the television channel MDTV

== Filmography ==
- Mama Cake (2012)
- Fallin' in Love (2012)
- Potong Bebek Angsa
- Comic 8 (2014)
- Rumah Gurita (Octopus Home)
- Di Balik 98 (In Behind 98) (2015)
- Tarot (2015)
- Sunshine Becomes You (2015)
- Stay with me (2015)
- Dimsun Martabak (2017)
- Laundry (2019)
- Imperfect (2019)

=== Television series ===
- Cinta Cenat Cenut 2
- Putih Abu-Abu 2
- I Miss You, I Need You, I Love You
- Cinta Terakhir Bukan Pacar Pertama
- Datang Ke Jogja Untuk Cinta
- Mama Saingan Cintaku
- 2 Hati 2 Cinta
- Indahnya Cinta Pertama
- Ramalan Bikin Galau
- From Asinan With Love

=== As presenter ===
- MTV Ping (Global TV)
- MTV Station Camp (Global TV)
- Breakout (NET TV)
- Nez Academy (NET TV)
- NET. One Anniversary (NET TV)
- Miss World 2013 Red Carpet (RCTI)
- Dahsyat Awards 2012 Red Carpet (RCTI)
- Teenlicious (Global TV)
- Super Boy (Global TV)
- Akhirnya Datang Juga (MNCTV)
- Rising Star Indonesia (RCTI)
- Indonesian Idol (RCTI)
- Siapa Mau Jadi Juara (Trans TV)

== Discography ==
- "Stranger in My Bed" (2015)
- "Flyin' Money" (2017, feat. Ananta Vinnie)
- "Bumblebee" (2017, feat. Ananta Vinnie)
