= Denny Caknan =

Indonesian singer-songwriter and actor

Denny Setyawan
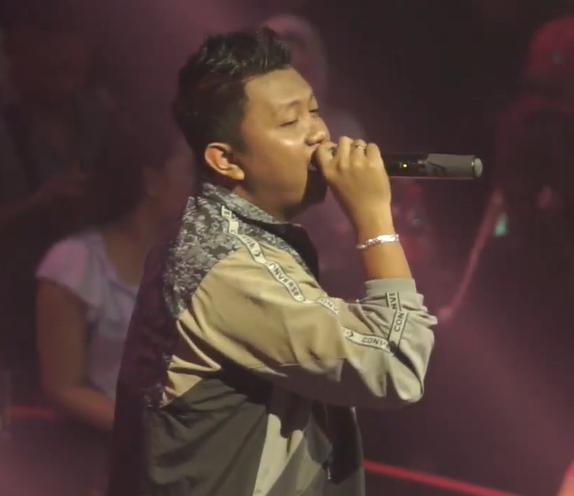
- Denny Caknan at Yogyakarta in 2019
- Born: December 10, 1993 (age 32); Ngawi, Indonesia
- Other name: Denny Caknan
- Education: University of Soerjo Ngawi
- Occupations: Musician; singer; songwriter
- Years active: 2017–present
- Spouse: Bella Bonita (m. 2023)

Denny Setiawan known by his stage name Denny Caknan (born December 10, 1993) is an Indonesian singer and songwriter of Javanese pop and koplo. He became known for his song "Kartonyono Medot Janji" which was a hit song in the market in 2019.

Some of his songs are written in Javanese language, with a few sentences in Indonesian language. He revealed that his music style is influenced by Didi Kempot, with pop nuances and kendhang influence in his instruments. Denny has also been involved in the production of the Javanese-language film series Balada Kampung Riwil, which is aired regularly on the YouTube channel.

== Early life and career ==
Before he was famous, Denny was a casual daily employee at the Environmental Service (DLH) of the Ngawi Regency Government. Then, he started his career as a solo singer by performing pop music. His pop songs did not find success until he decided to change direction to become a Javanese Pop singer.

Several songs performed by Denny Caknan received a warm welcome from music fans. And it is proven, his songs often occupy the trending on the YouTube video platform. In 2023, Denny Caknan successfully performed a song entitled "Kalih Welasku", and it trended on various music platforms such as YouTube and TikTok.
