= List of awards and nominations received by Agnez Mo =

Agnez Mo awards and nominations
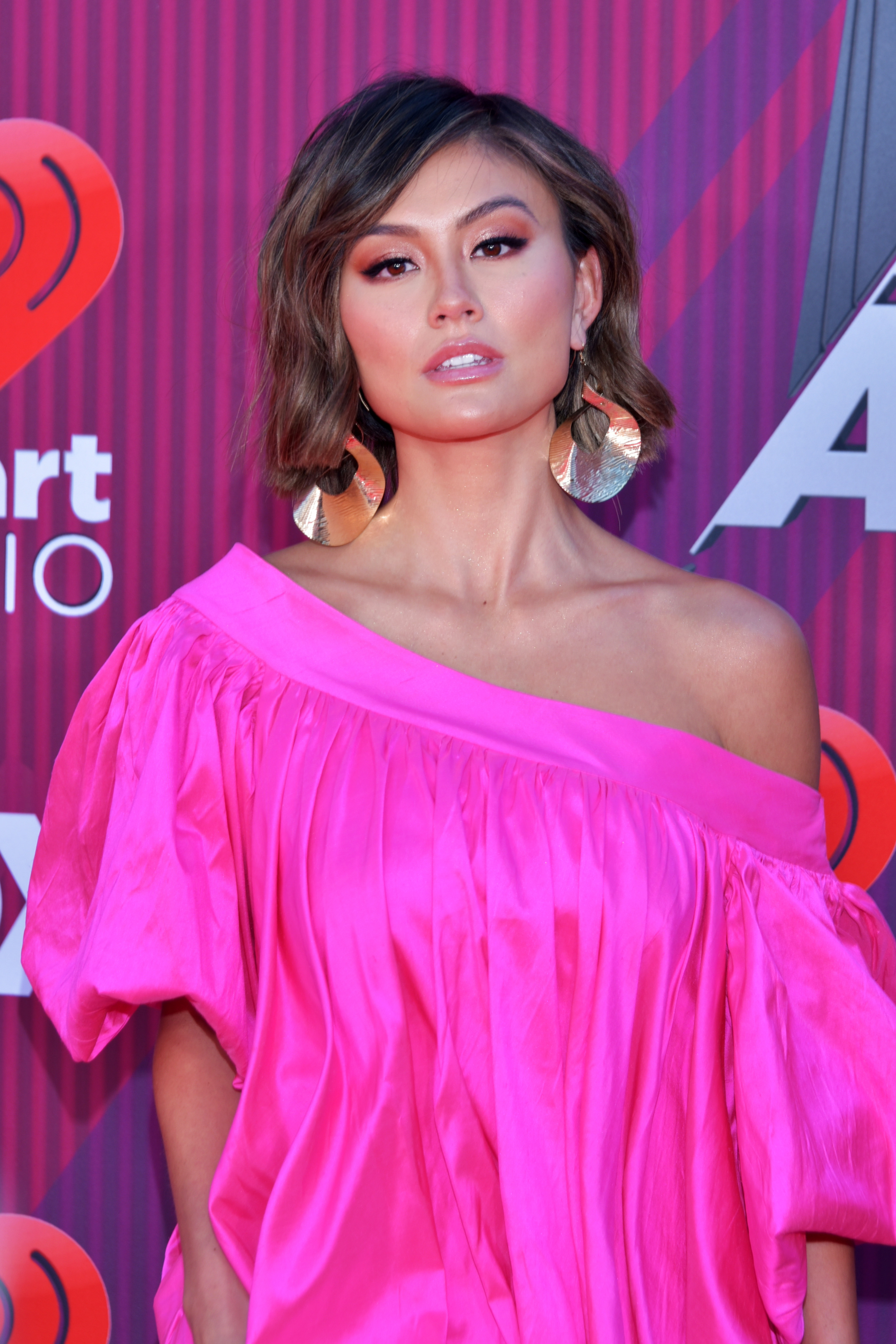
- Agnez at the 2019 iHeartRadio Music Awards
Awards and nominations
Awards	Wins	Nominations
Anugerah Bintang Luminar	1	2
Anugerah Industri Muzik	0	2
Anugerah Musik Indonesia	18	44
Anugerah Planet Muzik	1	20
Asia Song Festival	3	3
Asian Pop Music Awards	1	1
Be Radio Karawang	1	1
Billboard American Awards	0	1
Billboard Indonesia Music Awards	1	1
Bintang RPTI Awards	2	6
Brand Ambassador Awards	0	1
Bright Awards	2	3
Cek & Ricek Magazine Awards	1	1
Channel R Radio Awards	1	2
Cosmopolitan Reader's Choice Awards	1	1
Daf BAMA Music Awards	0	6
Dahsyatnya Awards	1	5
Espresso Awards	1	1
Extravaganza Awards	1	1
Festival Film Bandung	2	2
Gadis Awards	2	2
Go Show Awards	1	1
Golden Panther Awards	1	1
Gossip Awards Infotainment	1	1
Hai Magazine Awards	1	1
Hai Reader's Poll Music Awards	4	5
iHeartRadio Music Awards	1	2
iHeartRadio Titanium Awards	1	1
Inbox Awards	1	1
Indigo Awards	6	6
Indonesian Choice Awards	0	1
Indonesian News Channel Awards	1	1
Indonesian Social Media Awards	1	2
Indonesian Television Awards	2	2
Indonesian Twitter Awards	8	8
Indonesian Wannabe Awards	4	4
Indosat Awards	0	2
Infotainment Awards	0	11
Insert Awards	1	1
Intens Awards	1	1
Intuned Music Awards	1	8
Jawa Pos Awards	2	3
Johnny Andrean Awards	2	2
Joox Indonesia Music Awards	0	2
Joox Thailand Music Awards	1	1
JpopAsia Music Awards	7	11
Kawanku Celebs Awards	1	1
Kiss Awards	2	2
KLIK! Awards	0	2
LINE Indonesia Awards	1	1
LINE Today Awards	0	1
Marketing Celebrity Image Awards	9	9
Mnet Asian Music Awards	2	2
Mom & Kids Awards	0	1
MTV Ampuh	4	4
MTV Asia Awards	0	1
MTV Europe Music Awards	0	3
MTV Iggy	1	1
MTV Indonesia Awards	4	8
MTV TRL American	1	1
MTVU Woodie Awards	0	1
Nickelodeon Indonesia Kids' Choice Awards	5	15
Nickelodeon Kids' Choice Awards	0	1
Nyata Reader's Choice Awards	1	1
Opera Van Java Awards	1	1
Oz Radio Bandung FM Awards	0	4
Panasonic Awards	8	12
Platinum Vibes Radio Awards	2	2
Pop Awards	2	2
Poster Viewer's Choice Awards	1	1
RTHK International Pop Poll Awards	0	1
SBS PopAsia Awards	0	1
SCTV Awards	4	13
SCTV Music Awards	2	10
Seputar Indonesia Awards	0	1
Seputar Indonesia Newspaper Awards	2	2
Shorty Awards	1	9
Silet Awards	0	1
Social Media Awards Marketing Magazine & Media Wave	2	2
Social Star Awards	4	4
Socmed Awards	2	2
Star Entertainer Awards	1	1
Star Music Indonesian Awards	2	4
TikTok Awards	1	1
Trax FM Jakarta Awards	1	1
UDOU Music Awards	1	1
Unsigned Artist Hangout Awards	1	1
Update Music Awards	3	5
Urban Music Awards	0	2
V Live Awards	3	3
Video Music Indonesia Awards	4	4
WomanTalk Awards	1	1
World Music Awards	1	6
Yahoo! OMG Awards	5	8
Wins	238	
Nominations	426	

Agnez Mo is an Indonesian recording artist and actress. She started her career in entertainment industry at the age of six as a child singer and released her debut children studio album Si Meong in 1992, by MM Records. In 1995, she released her duet album and also her second studio album, Yess!, with Eza Yayang by Musica Studios, which their self-titled single was successfully into market. Her duet album was also earned an award for "Best Children Album" in 1999. She released her third studio album Bala-Bala in 1998, by Viva Music/Paragon Record. Her third album make her extension as a Top Children Singer in era-90. Artiscilik.com giving awards to her as "Best Teenager Child Artist" in 1999.

Agnes also became a children's presenter on some shows, including Tralala-Trilili, for which she was named Favorite Female Kids Show Presenter in two consecutive years (1999, 2000) at the Panasonic Awards. In 2001, she played the starring role in the soap opera Pernikahan Dini, for which she won Favorite Actress in two consecutive years (2001, 2002) at the Panasonic Awards. Bintang magazine listed her as "Top 10 Most Shining Star" in two consecutive years.

Agnes signed a record deal with Aquarius Musikindo in 2002 and released her debut studio album And the Story Goes in 2003, which won her number at the 8th Annual Anugerah Musik Indonesia, while being nominated for Best of the Best Album. The album earned her an award in the category of Best Newcomer Female Artist at the 2004 Anugerah Planet Muzik. She also won in Favorite Actress for Cewekku Jutek in 2003 and was nominated for Cantik in 2004 at the Panasonic Awards. In 2004, Bintang magazine listed her among the "Top 10 Most Shining Stars" and Hai magazine listed her among "Top 25 Hottest Celebrities Under 25" as well as "Top Mind Brand Young Celebrities".

From 2005 to 2011, Agnes released her second studio album Whaddup A.. '?! which produced four singles: "Cinta Diujung Jalan", "Tanpa Kekasihku", "Bukan Milikmu Lagi" and the MTV Indonesia Awards for Most Favorite Female-winning song "Tak Ada Logika". Agnes was subsequently nominated in ten categories at the 9th Annual Anugerah Musik Indonesia, and won four of them, including "Best Pop Female Solo Artist". Bintang magazine listed her as "Top 10 Most Shining Star" for the fourth time in 2006. Alongside her music success, she was honored for her phenomenal new generation in music, by Central Leadership Association of Indonesian Singers, Songwriters and Music Record Producers (DPP PAPPRI). In 2007, Agnes was appointed by the US Drug Enforcement Administration and IDEC Far East Region as an ambassador for Asia Anti Drugs Movement. She was also appointed as the ambassador of MTV EXIT in combating human trafficking in 2010. She released her 2008 mini album Nez and hits single "Matahariku" earned a Best Pop Female Solo Artist award at the 12th Annual Anugerah Musik Indonesia and nominated for Best Video of the Year at the 2008 MTV Indonesia Awards. Agnes' third studio album Sacredly Agnezious (2009) was released and also produced a single "Teruskanlah" which awarded the MTV Indonesia Awards for Best Artist of the Year. At the 13th Anugerah Musik Indonesia, she nominated for seven categories and winning four awards, including Best Pop Album. In the end of 2010, she was selected as one of the international co-hosts of 2010 American Music Awards. She released her 2011 compilation album Agnes Is My Name which nominated for Best Album at the 2011 Intuned Music Awards and 2011 JPopAsia Music Awards. The album was awarded by KFC and PT Swara Sangkar Emas, for her album sold over 1 million copies in 3 months. She has also earned 2011 Nugraha Bhakti Musik Indonesia (NBMI) award from the Minister of Culture and Tourism, and the Association of Indonesian Singers, Songwriters and Music Record Producers for her dedication and contribution, both in thought and deed for the progress and development and preservation of the Indonesian music.

In the United States, the Shorty Awards awarding her as The Shorty Vox Populi Award in 2012. At the Mnet Asian Music Awards, she earning twice times for Best Asian Artist (Indonesia) in 2012 (in Hong Kong) and 2017 (in Vietnam). She has been nominated twice times in the MTV Europe Music Awards, which in the category of for Best Asia and Pacific Act in 2011 and Best Southeast Asian Act in 2014. Agnes has earning five nominations, including World's Best Live Act and World's Best Female Artist at the 2014 World Music Awards.

== Anugerah Bintang Luminar ==
The Anugerah Bintang Luminar (English translation: Bintang Luminar Awards), is an independent awards and has credibility was given for individuals Indonesian superior, which widely known for the work and their contribution in the entertainment and fashion career. Agnes has received one award from 2 nominations.

Year	Nominee / work	Award	Result	Ref.
2012	Agnes Monica	Female Solo Singer	Nominated	
2012	Agnes Monica	People's Choice Award	Won	

== Anugerah Industri Muzik ==
The Anugerah Industri Muzik (English translation: Music Industry Awards), commonly known by the acronym AIM, are awards to honour the Malaysian music industry, first held in 1993. It is Malaysia's equivalent of the Grammy Awards.

Year	Nominee / work	Award	Result	Ref.
2008	"Matahariku"	Best Malay Song Performance by Foreign Artist	Nominated	
2009	"Teruskanlah"	Best Malay Song Performance by Foreign Artist	Nominated	

== Anugerah Musik Indonesia ==
The Anugerah Musik Indonesia (Indonesian translation: Indonesian Music Awards), was an annual Indonesian major music awards. They have been compared to the American Grammy Awards and British Brit Awards. The award was formalized in 1997 by ASIRI (Association of Indonesia Recording Industry), PAPPRI (Association of Indonesian Singers, Songwriters and Music Record Producers), and KCI (Copyright Office of Indonesia). It is the highest music awards given to outstanding artists in Indonesia. Agnes has received 18 awards from 43 nominations.

Year	Nominee / work	Award	Result	Ref.
2004	"Jera"	Best Pop Female Solo Artist	Won	
2004	"Bilang Saja"	Best Dance/Techno Production Work	Won	
2004	"Cinta Mati" (feat. Ahmad Dhani)	Best Pop Duo/Group	Won	
2004	"Cinta Mati" (feat. Ahmad Dhani)	Best Pop Song	Nominated	
2004	"Cinta Mati" (feat. Ahmad Dhani)	Best of the Best Production Work	Nominated	
2004	And The Story Goes	Best Pop Album	Nominated	
2004	And The Story Goes	Best of the Best Album	Nominated	
2004	And The Story Goes	Best Graphic Design Album	Nominated	
2006	"Tanpa Kekasihku"	Best Pop Female Solo Artist	Won	
2006	"Tanpa Kekasihku"	Best Pop Recording Producer	Won	
2006	"Bukan Milikmu Lagi"	Best R&B Production Work	Won	
2006	"Bukan Milikmu Lagi"	Best Mix Engineer	Nominated	
2006	Whaddup A.. '?!	Best Pop Album	Nominated	
2006	Whaddup A.. '?!	Best of the Best Album	Nominated	
2006	Whaddup A.. '?!	Best Graphic Design Album	Won	
2006	"Tanpa Kekasihku"	Best of the Best Production Work	Nominated	
2006	"Tak Ada Logika"	Best of the Best Production Work	Nominated	
2009	"Matahariku"	Best Pop Female Solo Artist	Won	
2009	"Godai Aku Lagi"	Best R&B Production Work	Nominated	
2010	"Teruskanlah"	Best Pop Female Solo Artist	Won	
2010	"Teruskanlah"	Best Pop Song	Nominated	
2010	"Teruskanlah"	Best Mix Engineer	Nominated	
2010	Sacredly Agnezious	Best of the Best Album	Won	
2010	Sacredly Agnezious	Best Graphic Design Album	Nominated	
2010	Sacredly Agnezious	Best Recording Album Producer	Nominated	
2010	Sacredly Agnezious	Best Pop Album	Won	
2011	"Karena Ku Sanggup"	Best Pop Female Solo Artist	Won	
2011	"Karena Ku Sanggup"	Best of the Best Production Work	Won	
2011	"Karena Ku Sanggup"	Best Mix Engineer	Won	
2011	"Karena Ku Sanggup"	Best Pop Song	Nominated	
2011	"Karena Ku Sanggup"	Best Pop Recording Producer	Nominated	
2012	"Paralyzed"	Best Pop Female Solo Artist	Won	
2012	"Rindu"	Best of the Best Production Work	Won	
2012	"Rindu"	Best Mix Engineer	Nominated	
2012	"Rindu"	Best Pop Recording Producer	Nominated	
2013	"Muda"	Best Pop/Urban Male/Female Solo Artist	Nominated	
2013	"Muda"	Best of the Best Production Work	Nominated	
2013	"Muda"	Best R&B/Soul Production Work	Won	
2013	"Muda"	Best Pop/Urban Recording Producer	Nominated	
2016	"Jatuh Cinta Tak Ada Logika" (feat. The Freaks)	Best Collaboration Production Work	Nominated	
2017	"Sebuah Rasa"	Best Pop Female Solo Artist	Nominated	
2017	"Sebuah Rasa"	Best Pop Songwriter	Nominated	
2017	"Sebuah Rasa"	Best Pop Recording Producer	Won	
2018	"Long As I Get Paid"	Best R&B Male/Female Solo Artist	Nominated	

== Anugerah Planet Muzik ==
First established in 2001, the Anugerah Planet Muzik (Malay translation: Planet Music Awards), was an annual music awards were organized by several media companies MediaCorp, Suria, Warna 94.2FM and Ria 89.7FM, to honour for artist in 3 countries (Singapore, Malaysia and Indonesia) who to be outstanding achievement in the regional of Malay and Indonesian music industry. Agnes has received one award from 20 nominations.

Year	Nominee / work	Award	Result	Ref.
2004	Agnes Monica	Best New Artist	Won	
2005	Agnes Monica	Most Popular Female Artist	Nominated	
2007	Tak Ada Logika	Most Popular Song	Nominated	
2007	Agnes Monica	Best Female Artist	Nominated	
2009	"Matahariku"	Best Song	Nominated	
2009	Agnes Monica	Favorite Indonesian Artist	Nominated	
2009	Agnes Monica	Most Popular Regional Artist	Nominated	
2011	Agnes Monica	Most Popular Regional Artist	Nominated	
2011	"Karena Ku Sanggup"	Best Female Artist	Nominated	
2012	"Rindu"	Best Female Artist	Nominated	
2012	"Paralyzed"	Most Popular Regional Song	Nominated	
2012	Agnes Monica	Most Popular Regional Artist	Nominated	
2013	Agnes Monica	Most Popular Regional Artist	Nominated	
2013	Agnes Monica	Social Media Icon	Nominated	
2013	"Muda"	Best Female Artist	Nominated	
2013	"Rindu"	Most Popular Regional Song	Nominated	
2016	Agnez Mo	Social Media Icon	Nominated	

== Asia Song Festival ==
The Asia Song Festival was an annual pop music festival held in South Korea that features artists from 10 Asian countries. Participating artists receive a plaque of appreciation from the Korean Ministry of Culture, Sports and Tourism and ‘Best Asian Artist Award’ from the chairman of Korea Foundation for International Culture and Exchange. This festival is recorded and broadcast by SBS (Korean freeTV), Fuji TV (Japanese freeTV/BS/CS), and 30 other broadcasters worldwide. Agnes was the first female singer in Indonesia invited to perform at this event. Agnes has received three awards.

Year	Nominee / work	Award	Result	Ref.
2008	Agnes Monica	Best Asian Artist	Won	
2009	Agnes Monica	Best Asian Artist	Won	
2009	Agnes Monica	Best Performance	Won	

== Asian Pop Music Awards ==
Year	Nominee / work	Award	Result	Ref.
2019	Agnez Mo	Best Female Artist (Indonesia)	Won	

== Be Radio Karawang ==
Year	Nominee / work	Award	Result	Ref.
2010	Agnes Monica	Best Female	Won	

== Billboard Awards ==
=== Billboard Indonesia Music Awards ===
Year	Nominee / work	Award	Result	Ref.
2020	Agnez Mo	Top Social Artist of the Year	Won	

=== Billboard Vietnam ===
Year	Nominee / work	Award	Result	Ref.
2018	Agnez Mo	Artist Of The Week	Won	

=== Billboard Women in Music Awards ===
Year	Nominee / work	Award	Result	Ref.
2014	Agnez Mo	Trailblazer Award	Nominated	
2022	Agnez Mo	Chart-Topper Award	Nominated	

== Bintang RPTI Awards ==
Year	Nominee / work	Award	Result	Ref.
2011	Agnes Monica	Favorite Star Advertisement	Nominated	
2012	Agnes Monica	Favorite Star Advertisement	Won	
2012	Agnes Monica	Celebrity Top Rating of the Year	Nominated	
2013	Agnes Monica	Favorite Star Advertisement	Won	
2014	Agnez Mo	Favorite Star Advertisement	Nominated	
2014	Agnez Mo	Celebrity Top Rating of the Year	Nominated	

== Bright Awards ==
The Bright Awards is a giving awards for the artist of Indonesian television advertising that was first held in 2016. This awards show has teamed up with MNC Media and Unity of Indonesian Advertising Companies. Agnes has received two awards from 3 nominations.

Year	Nominee / work	Award	Result	Ref.
2016	Agnez Mo	Female Star Advertisement (based on a survey of television viewers)	Won	
2016	Agnez Mo	Favorite Female Star Advertisement	Won	
2017	Agnez Mo	Favorite Female Star Advertisement	Nominated	

== Channel R Radio Awards ==
Year	Nominee / work	Award	Result	Ref.
2022	Agnez Mo	Best Female Solo Artist	Won	
2022	"Patience"	Best Song	Nominated	

== Cosmopolitan Reader's Choice Awards ==
The Cosmopolitan Reader's Choice Awards are an online awards presented by the Indonesian version of Cosmopolitan magazine since 2010, to honour lifestyle celebrities, based on a distributed poll. Agnes has received one award.

Year	Nominee / work	Award	Result	Ref.
2010	Agnes Monica	The Most Fashionable Women of the Year	Won	

== Dahsyatnya Awards ==
First established in 2009, the Dahsyatnya Awards are an awards ceremony presented by the daily Indonesian TV show Dahsyat that airs on RCTI, to honour artists who were more popular/outstanding (Indonesian: Terdahsyat) in music chart. Agnes has received one award from 5 nominations.

Year	Nominee / work	Award	Result	Ref.
2009	"Godai Aku Lagi"	Outstanding Role in Video Clip	Nominated	
2009	Agnes Monica	Outstanding Solo Singer	Won	
2012	Agnes Monica	Outstanding Female Solo Singer	Nominated	
2012	"Paralyzed"	Outstanding Video Clip	Nominated	
2017	"Sebuah Rasa"	Outstanding Model Video Clip	Nominated	

== Daf BAMA Music Awards ==
The daf BAMA MUSIC AWARDS is an international multicultural music award show presented by Daf Entertainment based in Hamburg, Germany. It has been created to honor artists from all over the world and at the same time unite the world with something as beautiful as music.This award shall immortalize creativity, unity and enjoyment among the global music lovers until the end of time. Awards are presented to the best and most successful musicians in Europe, Asia and Africa.

Year	Nominee / work	Award	Result	Ref.
2017	Agnez Mo	BAMA Best Female	Nominated	
2017	Agnez Mo	BAMA Best Asian Act	Nominated	
2017	Agnez Mo	BAMA Best Indonesian Act	Nominated	
2017	Agnez Mo	BAMA People's Choice Award	Nominated	
2017	Agnez Mo	BAMA Best Song	Nominated	
2018	Agnez Mo	Best Indonesian Act	Nominated	
2025	Agnez Mo	US/Indonesian Superstar	Nominated	

== Festival Film Bandung ==
The Festival Film Bandung (English translation: Bandung Film Festival) was an annual awards ceremony presented by the Bandung Film Forum community, to honour artists, directors and others in film. It has been held regularly since 1987. Agnes has received two awards.

Year	Nominee / work	Award	Result	Ref.
2011	Marissa	The Commendable Female Main Character	Won	
2012	Mimo Ketemu Poscha	The Commendable Female Main Character	Won	

== Gadis Awards ==
The Gadis Awards are an awards ceremony presented by the magazine Gadis to honour celebrities, figures, institutions, etc. in entertainment. Agnes has received two awards.

Year	Nominee / work	Award	Result	Ref.
2006	Agnes Monica	Go Regional	Won	
2010	Agnes Monica	Most Favorite Local Artist	Won	

== Golden Panther Awards ==
The Golden Panther Music Awards is an international awards show that was present to the world's best-selling artists from each major territory in multiple musical genres, including Pop/Rock, Alternative Rock, Country, Rap/Hip-Hop, Soul/R&B, Adult Contemporary, Contemporary Inspirational, Latin, EDM and Soundtrack.

Year	Nominee / work	Award	Result	Ref.
2019	Agnez Mo	Best Indonesian Artist	Won	
2020	Agnez Mo	Best Indonesian Artist	Nominated	
2020	Agnez Mo	Best Asian Artist	Nominated	

== Go Show Awards ==
The Go Show Awards are an awards ceremony presented by the same-title program and TPI, to honour celebrities in entertainment. Agnes has received one award.

Year	Nominee / work	Award	Result	Ref.
2007	Agnes Monica	Hottest Appearance	Won	

== Hai Reader's Poll Music Awards ==
The Hai Reader's Poll Music Awards are an online music awards created by the magazine Hai, to honour artists selected through online voting by audience. Agnes has received four awards from 5 nominations.

Year	Nominee / work	Award	Result	Ref.
2008	Agnes Monica	The Best Female	Won	
2010	Agnes Monica	The Best Female	Won	
2011	Agnes Monica	The Best Female	Won	
2012	Agnes Monica	The Best Female	Won	
2013	Agnes Monica	The Best Female	Nominated	

== iHeartRadio ==
=== iHeartRadio Titanium Awards ===
Year	Nominee / work	Award	Result	Ref.
2018	Agnez Mo	On The Verge Artist ("Overdose" feat Chris Brown)	Won	

=== iHeartRadio Music Awards ===
The iHeartRadio Music Awards is a music awards show that celebrates music heard throughout the year across iHeartMedia radio stations nationwide and on iHeartRadio, iHeartMedia's digital music platform. Founded by iHeartRadio in 2014, the event recognizes the most popular artists and music over the past year. Winners are chosen per cumulative performance data, while the public is able to vote in several categories.

Year	Nominee / work	Award	Result	Ref.
2019	Agnez Mo	Social Star Award	Won	
2020	Agnation	Best Fan Army	Nominated	

== Inbox Awards ==
Launched in 2008, the Inbox Awards are an awards ceremony presented by Indonesian TV show, Inbox, which aired on SCTV, to recognized talented artists in music and entertainment. Agnes has received one award.

Year	Nominee / work	Award	Result	Ref.
2011	"Paralyzed"	Most Inbox Video Clip	Won	

== Indigo Awards ==
The Indigo Awards are an annual award were presented by PT. Telekomunikasi Indonesia (Telkom) in 2009, to honour for artist, who have their song used most as ringback tones in all categories of creative industries and provide benefits for society, the environment, and create new business opportunities. Agnes has received six awards.

Year	Nominee / work	Award	Result	Ref.
2009	"Teruskanlah"	Best Female Artist	Won	
2010	"Karena Ku Sanggup"	Best Female Artist	Won	
2010	"Karena Ku Sanggup"	Song of the Year	Won	
2010	"Karena Ku Sanggup"	Artist of the Year	Won	
2011	"Rindu"	Best Female Artist	Won	
2011	"Rindu"	Artist of the Year	Won	

== Indonesian Social Media Awards ==
The Indonesian Social Media Awards are an annual award event which was established in 2016 by SCTV to honour celebrities who had become a trending topic, due to being the most favorite, and having more followers in various social media. Agnes has received one award from 2 nominations.

Year	Nominee / work	Award	Result	Ref.
2016	Agnez Mo	Female Celeb Twitter	Won	
2016	Agnez Mo	Female Celeb Facebook	Nominated	

== Indonesian Choice Awards ==
First established in 2014 by Indonesian television station NET., the Indonesian Choice Awards are an annual awards were honoured for artist(s) who had become quality talent in music and entertainment.

Year	Nominee / work	Award	Result	Ref.
2014	Agnez Mo	Female Singer of the Year	Nominated	

== Indonesian Television Awards ==
The Indonesian Television Awards are awarded to honour for talent in entertainment and program television, based on social media voting, such as Website, Twitter and Facebook. It was first aired in 2016 on RCTI. Agnez Mo received two award.

Year	Nominee / work	Award	Result	Ref.
2018	Agnez Mo	Most Popular Judge for Talent Search Program	Won	
2019	Agnez Mo	Most popular Television Star	Won	

== Indomusik Awards ==
Year	Nominee / work	Award	Result	Ref.
2025	Agnez Mo	The Viral Musician	Won	

== Indosat Awards ==
The Indosat Awards are a music awards ceremony presented by telecommunications provider Indosat, first presented in 2011. The awards are based on the popularity of a singer, as derived from sales, stage appearances, and radio chart positions.

Year	Nominee / work	Award	Result	Ref.
2011	Agnes Monica	Most Popular Female Pop Singer	Nominated	
2011	"Karena Ku Sanggup"	Most Popular Pop Song	Nominated	

== Infotainment Awards ==
The Infotainment Awards are an awards ceremony were presented by SCTV since 2012, to awarded for celebrities who listed achievement and phenomenal work in entertainment.

Year	Nominee / work	Award	Result	Ref.
2012	Agnes Monica	Most Infotainment Celebrity	Nominated	
2012	Agnes Monica	Most Infotainment Dressed Celebrity	Nominated	
2013	Agnes Monica	Most Lure Female Celebrity	Nominated	
2013	Agnes Monica	Most Awaited Celebrity Appearance	Nominated	
2013	Konser 20 Tahun Agnes Monica Berkarya	Most Phenomenal World of Entertainment Events	Nominated	
2014	Agnes Monica	Most Lure Female Celebrity	Nominated	
2014	Agnes Monica	Most Awaited Celebrity Appearance	Nominated	
2014	Agnes Monica	World Achievement Indonesian Celebrity	Nominated	
2014	Agnes Monica	Celebrity of the Year	Nominated	
2016	Agnez Mo	Most Awaited Celebrity Appearance	Nominated	
2016	Agnez Mo	World Achievement Indonesian Celebrity	Nominated	

== Insert Awards ==
The Insert Awards are an awards ceremony presented by program Insert, to awarded for celebrities in entertainment. Agnes has received one award.

Year	Nominee / work	Award	Result	Ref.
2011	Agnes Monica	Celebrity of the Year	Won	

== Intuned Music Awards ==
The Intuned Music Awards was an international online awards ceremony, where fans can cast their votes online for their favourites. For the inaugural event, with over 132.000 votes cast. Agnes has received one award from 8 nominations.

Year	Nominee / work	Award	Result	Ref.
2011	"Paralyzed"	Best Artist/Band	Nominated	
2011	"Paralyzed"	Best Female Solo	Nominated	
2011	"Paralyzed"	Best Musical Ability	Won	
2011	"Paralyzed"	Best Music Video	Nominated	
2011	Agnes Is My Name	Best Album	Nominated	
2011	Agnes Monica	Most Promising Artist	Nominated	
2011	Agnes Monica	Best Use of Social Media	Nominated	
2011	Agnes Monica	Sexiest Female Singer	Nominated	

== Jawa Pos Awards ==
The Jawa Pos Awards (currently JawaPos.com Readers Choice Awards) was an online awards have first established in 2017 by an Indonesian national daily newspaper Jawa Pos, to honour for public figure in music, film and entertainment. Agnes has won two awards from 3 nominations.

Year	Nominee / work	Award	Result	Ref.
2006	Agnes Monica	Favorite Actress	Won	
2006	Agnes Monica	Favorite Female Solo Singer	Won	
2017	Agnez Mo	Favorite Female Singer	Nominated	

== Johnny Andrean Awards ==
Year	Nominee / work	Award	Result	Ref.
2010	Agnes Monica	Favorite Actress (Femina Readers Choice)	Won	
2010	Agnes Monica	The Most Stylish Celebrity	Won	

== JOOX Awards ==
=== JOOX Indonesia Music Awards ===
Year	Nominee / work	Award	Result	Ref.
2021	Agnez Mo	Indonesian Artist of the Year	Nominated	
2021	Agnation	Best Fansbase of the Year	Nominated	

=== JOOX Thailand Music Awards ===
The Joox Thailand Music Awards (style as JOOX Thailand Music Awards), is an annual music awards presented by JOOX Thailand. The first ceremony was held 23 March 2017 at centerpoint studio.

Year	Nominee / work	Award	Result	Ref.
2022	Agnez Mo	Social Superstar	Won	

== JpopAsia Music Awards ==
The JpopAsia Music Awards (sometimes JpopAsia International Music Awards or JIMA Awards) are the largest online Asian music awards, with nominees picked by online community. This award was originally created for artists based in Taiwan, Japan, and Korea. Because of that, her first nomination was removed, but she was later re-listed in response to complaints from her fans. Agnes has received seven awards from 11 nominations.

Year	Nominee / work	Award	Result	Ref.
2010	Agnes Monica	Favorite Artist/Band	Won	
2010	Agnes Monica	Best Female Solo	Won	
2010	Agnes Monica	Most Promising Artist/Band	Won	
2010	Agnes Monica	Best Musical Ability (vocal, instrument, etc.)	Won	
2010	Agnes Monica	Best Use of Social Media (Facebook, Twitter, etc.)	Won	
2010	Agnes Monica	Sexiest Female Singer	Won	
2010	Agnes Monica	Most Wanted-to-be Girlfriend	Won	
2011	Agnes Monica	Best Use of Social Media (Facebook, Twitter, etc.)	Nominated	
2011	Agnes Is My Name	Best Album	Nominated	
2011	"Paralyzed"	Best Music Video	Nominated	
2011	"Jera"	Best Music Video	Nominated	

== Jupiter Music Awards ==
The Jupiter Music Awards is a music awards ceremony organised by the Asian Television Awards (ATA) to recognise outstanding musicians, groups, and industry professionals.

Year	Nominee / work	Award	Result	Ref.
2025	"Cherry on Top BiniMo Remix" (Bini feat Agnez Mo)	Song of the Year	Nominated	
2025	"Cherry on Top BiniMo Remix" (Bini feat Agnez Mo)	Collaboration of the Year	Nominated	
2025	"Cherry on Top BiniMo Remix" (Bini feat Agnez Mo)	Music Video of the year	Nominated	

== KISS Awards ==
Year	Nominee / work	Award	Result	Ref.
2020	Agnez Mo	Best Pop Female Singer	Won	
2022	Agnez Mo	Best Pop Female Singer	Won	

== KLIK! Awards ==
The KLIK! Awards was an awards ceremony were established in 2011 and presented by program KLIK!, to honour for artist and clip makers in music.

Year	Nominee / work	Award	Result	Ref.
2011	"Paralyzed"	Best Music Video	Nominated	
2013	"Muda"	Favorite Pop Video	Nominated	

== LINE Indonesia Awards ==
Year	Nominee / work	Award	Result	Ref.
2019	Agnez Mo	Most Favorite Female Musician	Won	

== LINE TODAY Awards ==
Year	Nominee / work	Award	Result	Ref.
2021	Agnez Mo	Newsmaker Of The Year	Nominated	

== Marketing Celebrity Image Awards ==
Year	Nominee / work	Award	Result	Ref.
2004	Agnes Monica	The Most Boyish Actress	Won	
2004	Agnes Monica	The Most Modern Actress	Won	
2004	Agnes Monica	The Most Oriental Actress	Won	
2004	Agnes Monica	The Most Favorite Young Actress	Won	
2005	Agnes Monica	The Most Stylish Image Actress	Won	
2005	Agnes Monica	The Most Boyish Image Actress	Won	
2005	Agnes Monica	The Most Ignored Image Actress	Won	
2005	Agnes Monica	The Best Selling Image Actress	Won	
2005	Agnes Monica	The Most Modern Image Actress	Won	

== Mnet Asian Music Awards ==
The Mnet Asian Music Awards (commonly abbreviated as MAMA), was a major annual K-pop music award from Mnet Media. Agnes has received two awards.

Year	Nominee / work	Award	Result	Ref.
2012	Agnes Monica	Best Asian Artist (Indonesia)	Won	
2017	Agnez Mo	Best Asian Artist (Indonesia)	Won	

== Mom & Kids Awards ==
The Mom & Kids Awards are an annual awards were presented by MNCTV and established in 2014, for artist in music and entertainment as inspiration to mother and kids.

Year	Nominee / work	Award	Result	Ref.
2016	Agnez Mo	Favorite Idol Singer	Nominated	

== MTV Awards ==
=== MTV Ampuh ===
Year	Nominee / work	Award	Result	Ref.
2003	Agnes Monica	Female Artist of the Year	Won	
2004	Agnes Monica	Artist of the Year	Won	
2004	Agnes Monica	Female Artist of the Year	Won	
2008	Agnes Monica	Female Artist of the Year	Won	

=== MTV Asia Awards ===
The MTV Asia Awards is a show that gives recognition and awards for Asian and international in achievements in cinema, fashion, humanitarian pursuits, and music. Most of the awards are voted for by viewers from the Asian region.

Year	Nominee / work	Award	Result	Ref.
2005	Agnes Monica	Favorite Artist Indonesia	Nominated	

=== MTV Europe Music Awards ===
The MTV Europe Music Awards are awarded by MTV Networks Europe to popular music videos in Europe. The awards are chosen by European MTV viewers. Since 2011, other worldwide/regional nominations have been added. The awards are presented annually and broadcast live on MTV Europe, MTV Live HD and most of the international MTV channels as well as online.

Year	Nominee / work	Award	Result	Ref.
2011	Agnes Monica	Best Asia and Pacific Act	Nominated	
2014	Agnez Mo	Best Southeast Asian Act	Nominated	
2020	Agnez Mo	Best Southeast Asian Act	Nominated	

=== MTV EXIT (End Exploitation and Trafficking) ===
Year	Nominee / work	Award	Result	Ref.
2010	Agnez Mo	Human Trafficking Ambassador	Won	

=== MTV Iggy ===
Year	Nominee / work	Award	Result	Ref.
2014	"Coke Bottle" (feat. Timbaland & T.I.)	The Best Music Videos of May 2014	Won	
2014	"Coke Bottle" (feat. Timbaland & T.I.)	Song of the Summer	Won	

=== MTV Indonesia Awards ===
The MTV Indonesia Awards are an annual music awards were established in 2001 and presented by MTV Indonesia, as chosen by their viewers throughout Indonesia. Agnes has received four awards from 8 nominations.

Year	Nominee / work	Award	Result	Ref.
2006	"Tak Ada Logika"	Most Favorite Female	Won	
2006	"Tak Ada Logika"	Best Video of the Year	Nominated	
2008	"Matahariku"	Best Artist of the Year	Nominated	
2008	"Matahariku"	Most Favorite Female	Won	
2009	"Teruskanlah"	Most Favorite Female Artist	Won	
2009	"Teruskanlah"	Best Artist of the Year	Won	
2009	"Teruskanlah"	Best Video of the Year	Nominated	
2009	Agnes Monica	Most Inspiring Artist	Nominated	

=== MTVU Woodie Awards ===
Year	Nominee / work	Award	Result	Ref.
2014	Agnez Mo "Coke Bottle"	The Video That Gets On Air	Nominated	

== Music Rank Extra Awards ==
Year	Nominee / work	Award	Result	Ref.
2020	Agnez Mo	Asian Performer of the Year	Nominated	
2020	Agnez Mo	Asian Act	Nominated	

== Nickelodeon Kids' Choice Awards ==
=== Nickelodeon Indonesia Kids' Choice Awards ===
The Nickelodeon Indonesia Kids' Choice Awards is the Indonesian version of Nickelodeon Kids' Choice Awards, held since 2008 in Jakarta. Agnes has received five awards from 15 nominations.

Year	Nominee / work	Award	Result	Ref.
2008	Agnes Monica	Favorite Female Singer	Won	
2008	Agnes Monica	Indonesian Star Wannabe Award	Won	
2009	Agnes Monica	Favorite Female Singer	Nominated	
2009	Agnes Monica	Favorite Actress	Nominated	
2009	Agnes Monica	Indonesian Star Wannabe Award	Nominated	
2010	Agnes Monica	Favorite Female Singer	Nominated	
2010	Agnes Monica	Indonesian Star Wannabe Award	Nominated	
2010	Agnes Monica	Slime Star	Won	
2011	Agnes Monica	Favorite Female Singer	Won	
2011	Agnes Monica	Favorite Actress	Nominated	
2011	Agnes Monica	Indonesian Star Wannabe Award	Nominated	
2012	Agnes Monica	Favorite Singer	Nominated	
2012	Agnes Monica	Big Inspiration	Won	
2013	Agnes Monica	Favorite Singer	Nominated	
2017	Agnes Monica	Favorite Singer	Nominated	

=== Nickelodeon Kids' Choice Awards (U.S.) ===
The Nickelodeon Kids' Choice Awards (U.S.) is an annual awards show on the Nickelodeon cable channel in late March or early April that honors the year's biggest television, movie, and music acts, as voted by Nickelodeon viewers. Winners receive a hollow orange blimp figurine.

Year	Nominee / work	Award	Result	Ref.
2012	Agnes Monica	Favorite Asian Act	Nominated	

== Opera Van Java Awards ==
The OVJ Awards are an awards ceremony were presented by comedy program Opera Van Java and first established in 2011, to awarded for main artist who have appeared as original cast and guest star. Agnes has received one award.

Year	Nominee / work	Award	Result	Ref.
2012	Agnes Monica	Most Tempted Artist	Won	

== Oz Radio Bandung FM Awards ==
The Oz Radio Bandung FM Awards are an online radio awards were presented by OZ Radio FM, for talent musician/singer who have listed of 'friendly' in music.

Year	Nominee / work	Award	Result	Ref.
2017	NIC	Most Friendly Fanbase	Nominated	
2017	Agnez Mo	Most Friendly Female Singer	Nominated	
2018	Agnez Mo	Most Friendly Female Singer	Nominated	
2018	NIC	Most Friendly Fanbase	Nominated	

== Panasonic Awards ==
The Panasonic Awards is an award presented to television programs and individuals, based on poll results. The poll was originally conducted by the Indonesian tabloid Citra, but was taken over by Nielsen Media Research in 2004. Agnes has won eight awards from 12 nominations.

Year	Nominee / work	Award	Result	Ref.
1999	Tralala-Trilili	Favorite Female Kids Show Presenter	Won	
2000	Tralala-Trilili	Favorite Female Kids Show Presenter	Won	
2001	Pernikahan Dini	Favorite Drama Series Program	Won	
2001	Pernikahan Dini	Favorite Actress	Won	
2002	Pernikahan Dini	Favorite Actress	Won	
2003	Cewekku Jutek	Favorite Actress	Won	
2004	Cantik	Favorite Actress	Nominated	
2005	Ku T'lah Jatuh Cinta	Favorite Actress	Nominated	
2006	Pink	Favorite Actress	Won	
2007	Kawin Muda	Favorite Actress	Won	
2011	Pejantan Cantik	Favorite Actress	Nominated	
2013	Mimo Ketemu Poscha	Favorite Actress	Nominated	

== Platinum Vibes Radio ==
Year	Nominee / work	Award	Result	Ref.
2022	"Patience"	Most Requested Songs	Won	
2022	Agnez Mo	Top Social Media Mentions, Retweets Etc.	Won	

== Pop Awards ==
The Pop Awards is an award for celebrities who inspire the younger generation. The show was first held in 2016, and aired on RCTI. Agnes has received two awards.

Year	Nominee / work	Award	Result	Ref.
2016	Agnez Mo	Fit Pop Awards	Won	
2016	Agnez Mo	Style Pop Awards	Won	

== RTHK International Pop Poll Awards ==
Year	Nominee / work	Award	Result	Ref.
2022	Agnez Mo	Top Female Singer	Nominated	

== SBS PopAsia Awards ==
The SBS PopAsia Awards has been giving awards yearly since 2012. Every award has been accorded to a K-pop singer or group.

Year	Nominee / work	Award	Result	Ref.
2017	Agnez Mo	Best Solo Artist/Star	Nominated	

== SCTV Awards ==
First established in 2001, the SCTV Awards are an annual awards ceremony presented by the Indonesian TV station SCTV, to honour artists who became popular (Indonesian: Ngetop) in various programs. It's based on the audience's votes. Agnes has received three awards from 11 nominations.

Year	Nominee / work	Award	Result	Ref.
2002	Kejar Daku Kau Kutangkap	Famous Actress	Won	
2003	Kejar Daku Kau Kutangkap	Famous Actress	Nominated	
2004	"Jera"	Famous Singer	Nominated	
2004	Cantik	Famous Actress	Won	
2005	Cantik	Famous Actress	Won	
2005	"Bilang Saja"	Famous Singer	Nominated	
2006	"Bukan Milikmu Lagi"	Famous Singer	Nominated	
2011	"Paralyzed"	Famous Singer	Nominated	
2012	"Rindu"	Famous Singer	Nominated	
2013	"Muda"	Famous Singer	Nominated	
2015	"Coke Bottle" (feat. Timbaland & T.I.)	Famous Singer	Nominated	
2018	"Sebuah Rasa" [Orang Ketiga]	Famous Soundtrack	Won	
2021	"Coz I Love You" [Buku Harian Seorang Istri]	Famous Soundtrack	Nominated	
2021	"Rindu" [Suci dalam Cinta]	Famous Soundtrack	Nominated	
2022	"Coz I Love You" [Buku Harian Seorang Istri]	Famous Soundtrack	Nominated	

== SCTV Music Awards ==
The SCTV Music Awards are a music awards ceremony presented by Indonesian TV station SCTV, to honour artists who were popular (Indonesian: Paling Ngetop) in various songs and selling albums. It is based on the audience's vote. Agnes has received two awards from 10 nominations.

Year	Nominee / work	Award	Result	Ref.
2004	And the Story Goes	Famous Solo Pop Album	Nominated	
2006	Whaddup A.. '?!	Famous Solo Pop Album	Won	
2009	Matahariku (single)	Famous Solo Pop Album	Nominated	
2010	Sacredly Agnezious	Famous Female Solo Pop Album	Nominated	
2011	Karena Ku Sanggup (single)	Famous Solo Pop Album	Nominated	
2011	"Karena Ku Sanggup"	Most Famous Song	Nominated	
2012	Agnes Is My Name	Famous Female Solo Pop Album	Nominated	
2013	Agnes Monica	Most Famous Female Solo Singer	Won	
2014	Agnes Monica	Most Famous Female Solo Singer	Nominated	
2015	Agnez Mo	Most Famous Female Solo Singer	Nominated	

== Seputar Indonesia Awards ==
First established in 2011, the Seputar Indonesia Awards are an annual awards presented by Seputar Indonesia and RCTI, to honour important newsmakers and figures.

Year	Nominee / work	Award	Result	Ref.
2011	Agnes Monica	Young Newsmaker of the Year	Nominated	

== Shorty Awards ==
The Shorty Awards, also known as The Shorties, are an annual awards event, recognizing the people producing real time short form content on Twitter and other websites. The awards were created in 2008. Agnes has received one award from 9 nominations.

Year	Nominee / work	Award	Result	Ref
2012	Agnes Monica	The Shorty Vox Populi Award	Won	
2012	Agnes Monica	The Best Actress in Social Media	Nominated	
2012	Agnes Monica	The Best Singer in Social Media	Nominated	
2012	Agnes Monica	The Best Music in Social Media	Nominated	
2012	Agnes Monica	The Best Fashion in Social Media	Nominated	
2013	Agnes Monica	The Best Singer in Social Media	Nominated	
2013	Agnes Monica	The Best Actress in Social Media	Nominated	
2013	Agnes Monica	The Best Music in Social Media	Nominated	
2013	Agnes Monica	The Best Celebrity Fashion in Social Media	Nominated	
2014	Agnez Mo	The Best Singer in Social Media	Nominated	
2014	Agnez Mo	The Best Music in Social Media	Nominated	
2014	Agnez Mo	The Best Actrees in Social Media	Nominated	
2014	Agnez Mo	The Best Fashion in Social Media	Nominated	
2014	Agnez Mo	The Best Indonesia Social Media	Nominated	
2015	Agnez Mo	The Best Singer in Social Media	Nominated	
2015	Agnez Mo	The Best Artist in Social Media	Nominated	
2015	Agnez Mo	The Best Actrees in Social Media	Nominated	
2015	Agnez Mo	The Best Fashion in Social Media	Nominated	
2015	Agnez Mo	The Best Celebrity in Social Media	Nominated	

== Silet Awards ==
The Silet Awards was an awards ceremony presented by RCTI infotainment Silet and established in 2014, awarded to celebrities who took part in infotainment programs.

Year	Nominee / work	Award	Result	Ref.
2014	Agnez Mo	Razored Phenomenal Artist	Nominated	

== Social Media Award (Marketing Magazine & Media Wave) ==
Year	Nominee / work	Award	Result	Ref.
2019	Agnez Mo	Female Singer	Won	
2020	Agnez Mo	Female Singer	Won	

== Social Star Awards ==
The Social Star Awards are an multi-genre international awards were presented by Starcount and was inaugural on 2013, to honour for celebrities whose recognized for their popularity in the world of social media. Agnes has received three awards.

Year	Nominee / work	Award	Result	Ref.
2013	Agnes Monica	Indonesian Musician	Won	
2013	Agnes Monica	Indonesian Musician	Won	
2013	Agnes Monica	South East Asia	Won	

== Socmed Awards ==
The Socmed Awards is an awardfor celebrities and public figures who dominated the popularity of various social media platforms, such as Twitter, Instagram, Blogs, and YouTube. Agnes has received two awards.

Year	Nominee / work	Award	Result	Ref.
2016	Agnez Mo	Celeb Twit Female	Won	
2016	Agnez Mo	Socmed Star	Won	

== Star Musik Indonesian Awards ==
Year	Nominee / work	Award	Result	Ref.
2010	Agnes Monica	Most Favorite Pop Female Singer	Won	
2010	Agnes Monica	Most Stylist Singer/Band	Nominated	
2010	"Matahariku"	Most Favorite Song in 20 Century	Nominated	
2010	"Tanpa Kekasihku"	Most Favorite Video Clip in 20 Century	Won	

== UDOU MUSIC ==
Year	Nominee / work	Award	Result	Ref.
2020	Agnez Mo	Top Rising Asian Artist	Won	

== Unsigned Artist Hangout Awards ==
The Unsigned Artist Hangout Awards are an online radio awards for local and international indie music of the genres R&B, hip hop, urban, etc. from US radio streaming U.N.G Radio Station. Agnes has received one award.

Year	Nominee / work	Award	Result	Ref.
2016	Agnez Mo	Most Requested Artist	Won	

== Update Music Awards ==
The Music Update Awards is an online poll that will reward land musicians and singers who have worked this year and also for their fans in support of their idols.

Year	Nominee / work	Award	Result	Ref.
2016	Agnez Mo	Celebrity of the Year	Won	
2017	Agnez Mo	Best Female Singer of the Year	Won	
2018	Agnez Mo	Best Male/Female singer of the Year	Won	
2018	"Overdose" (feat. Chris Brown)	Best Song of the Year	Nominated	
2018	Agnation	Fanbase Musik of the Year	Nominated	
2019	Agnez Mo	Best Male/Female Singer of the Year	Won	
2019	"Diamonds" (feat. French Montana)	Best Song of the Year	Nominated	
2019	"Sebuah Rasa"	Best Soundtrack of the Year	Nominated	
2019	Agnation	Fanbase Musik of the Year	Won	

== Urban Music Awards ==
The Urban Music Awards (UMA) is a hip-hop, R&B, dance, and soul music awards ceremony which was launched by Jordan Kensington in 2003 and is now held in several countries.

Year	Nominee / work	Award	Result	Ref.
2022	Agnez Mo	Artist of the Year (Asia)	Nominated	
2022	"Patience"	Best Single	Nominated	

== Video Musik Indonesia Awards ==
The Video Musik Indonesia Awards (Indonesian: Music Video Awards) are an annual awards presented by Indosiar, to honour artists in music, based on audience's vote. Agnes has received four awards.

Year	Nominee / work	Award	Result	Ref.
2006	Agnes Monica	Best Artist	Won	
2006	Whaddup A.. '?!	Most Favorite Video	Won	
2006	"Tanpa Kekasihku"	Favorite Video Clip	Won	
2006	"Tanpa Kekasihku"	Best Actress in Video Clip	Won	

== World Music Awards ==
The World Music Awards is an international awards show founded in 1989 under the patronage of Albert II, Prince of Monaco and based in Monte Carlo. Awards are presented to the world's best-selling artist in various categories and to the best-selling artist from each major territory. Sales figures are provided by the International Federation of the Phonographic Industry. Agnes has received one award from 6 nominations.

Year	Nominee / work	Award	Result	Ref.
2014
2014	"Coke Bottle" (feat. Timbaland & T.I.)	World's Best Song	Nominated	
2014	"Coke Bottle" (feat. Timbaland & T.I.)	World's Best Video	Nominated	
2014	Agnez Mo	World's Best Female Artist	Nominated	
2014	Agnez Mo	World's Best Live Act	Nominated	
2014	Agnez Mo	World's Best Entertainer of the Year	Nominated	

== Yahoo! OMG Awards ==
The Yahoo! OMG Awards are an awards ceremony presented by Yahoo! Indonesia to honour celebrities in entertainment, based on an online voting system. It was first established in 2012. Agnes has received five awards from 8 nominations.

Year	Nominee / work	Award	Result	Ref.
2012	Agnes Monica	Outstanding International Achievement	Won	
2012	Agnes Monica	Most Wanted Female	Won	
2012	Agnes Monica	Most Inspiring	Won	
2012	Agnes Monica	Most Stylish	Won	
2013	Agnes Monica	Most Talked About	Won	
2013	Agnes Monica	Celeb with Most Die-Hard Fans	Nominated	
2013	Agnes Monica	Most Criticized Celeb	Nominated	
2014	Agnes Monica	Most Over-Exposed Celeb	Nominated	

== Year end Pinnacle Awards (WPVR NYC Platinum Vibes) ==
Year	Nominee / work	Award	Result	Ref.
2023	Agnez Mo	Best Solo Artist (2022)	Won	
2023	Agnez Mo	Best R&B Artist (2022)	Nominated	
2023	"Patience"	Song of the Year (2022)	Nominated	
2023	"Patience"	R&B Song of the Year (2022)	Won	

== Organization accolades ==
=== artiscilik.com ===
Year	Nominee / work	Award	Result	Ref.
1999	Agnes Monica	Best Teenager Child Artist	Won	

=== kapanlagi.com ===
Year	Nominee / work	Award	Result	Ref.
2008	Agnes Monica	Top 10 Most Commendable Artist	Included	
2008	Agnes Monica	Top 10 Most Kissable Artist	Included	
2010	Agnes Monica	Top 10 Most Revered Artist	Included	
2010	Agnes Monica	Top 10 Most Kissable Artist	Included	
2011	Agnes Monica	Top 10 Most Shining Stars	Included	
2011	Agnes Monica	Top 10 Most Widely Revered Artist	Included	

=== Thetoptens.com ===
Year	Nominee / work	Award	Result	Ref.
2013	Agnes Monica	Best Asian Pop Artists	#2	
2013	Agnes Monica	Top Ten Dancers in Asia	#5	

=== AMICA Magazine ===
Year	Nominee / work	Award	Result	Ref.
2010	Agnes Monica	Adorable Hairstyle Celebrity Award	Recipient	

=== Anugerah Kekayaan Intelektual Nasional ===
Year	Nominee / work	Award	Result	Ref.
2012	Agnes Monica	Young of Achievement and Inspirational	Recipient	

=== Aquarius Musikindo ===
Aquarius Musikindo has presenting certificate to Agnes Monica in sixth times for her sales album and singles.

Year	Nominee / work	Award	Result	Ref.
2003	And The Story Goes	Double Platinum Award	Recipient	
2005	Whaddup A.. '?!	Triple Platinum Award	Recipient	
2008	"Godai Aku Lagi"/"Matahariku"	3× Platinum RBT Award	Recipient	
2009	Sacredly Agnezious	Multi Platinum Award	Recipient	
2011	Agnes Is My Name	Multi Platinum Award	Recipient	

=== Asia Anti Drug Ambassador ===
Year	Nominee / work	Award	Result	Ref.
2007	Agnes Monica	Asia Anti Drug Ambassador	Recipient	

=== BAZAAR Vietnam ===
Year	Nominee / work	Award	Result	Ref.
2022	Agnez Mo	The most awarded artist in the history of Indonesia	Recipient	

=== Bintang Magazine ===
Year	Nominee / work	Award	Result	Ref.
2001	Agnes Monica	Top 10 Most Shining Star	Included	
2002	Agnes Monica	Top 10 Most Shining Star	Included	
2004	Agnes Monica	Top 10 Most Shining Star	Included	
2006	Agnes Monica	Top 10 Most Shining Star	Included	

=== Capital Xtra ===
Year	Nominee / work	Award	Result	Ref.
2022	Agnez Mo	The Most Celebrated Artist in Indonesia	Recipient	
2022	Agnez Mo	The Richest Celebrity in Indonesia	Recipient	

=== Cek & Ricek Magazine ===
Year	Nominee / work	Award	Result	Ref.
2002	Agnes Monica	Star of the Year	Won	

=== Class Mild Awards ===
The Class Mild Awards was an exclusive award to honour for Indonesian musicians. The winners are selected by a jury of music critics, musicians, and journalists. Agnes has received one award.

Year	Nominee / work	Award	Result	Ref.
2009	Agnes Monica	Talk Less Do More Award	Recipient	

=== Composure Magazine ===
Year	Nominee / work	Award	Result	Ref.
2022	Agnez Mo	Indonesia's Most Awarded Musician	Recipient	

=== Cosmopolitan Magazine ===
Year	Nominee / work	Award	Result	Ref.
2010	Agnes Monica	Sexiest Female Indonesian Singer	Included	

=== DPP PAPPRI (Central Leadership Association of Indonesian Singers, Songwriters and Music Record Producers) ===
Year	Nominee / work	Award	Result	Ref.
2006	Agnes Monica	Phenomenal New Generation Indonesian Music Artist	Recipient	

=== Espresso (Entertainment Program of ANTV) ===
Year	Nominee / work	Award	Result	Ref.
2009	Agnes Monica	Kartini Modern	Won	

=== Extravaganza Awards ===
Year	Nominee / work	Award	Result	Ref.
2007	Agnes Monica	Best Performance Artist	Won	

=== Femina Magazine ===
Year	Nominee / work	Award	Result	Ref.
2010	Agnes Monica	One of the Headline Newsmakers as Proud Achievement	Included	

=== Fortune Indonesia ===
Fortune Indonesia publishes a list of individuals the publication considers to be the most influential young leaders for the year in Indonesia.

Year	Nominee / work	Award	Result	Ref.
2023	Agnez Mo	Fortune Indonesia's 40 Under 40	#1	

=== FORBES Asia ===
Year	Nominee / work	Award	Result	Ref.
2020	Agnez Mo	Asia-Pacific's Most Influential Celebrities on Social Media	Recipient	

=== Gossip Award Infotainment ===
Year	Nominee / work	Award	Result	Ref.
2002	Agnes Monica	One Million Gossip Actress	Won	

=== Globe Asia Magazine ===
Year	Nominee / work	Award	Result	Ref.
2007	Agnes Monica	Top 50 Most Powerful Indonesian Women	Included	
2018	Agnez Mo	The Power of Woman (Woman in Arts, Culture & Entertainment)	Included	
2019	Agnez Mo	Top 99 Most Inspiring Woman of the Year (Creative)	Included	

=== Huffington Post ===
Year	Nominee / work	Award	Result	Ref.
2014	Agnez Mo	8 Asian Entertainers Who Are Making Names for Themselves in the States	Included	

=== Hai Magazine ===
Year	Nominee / work	Award	Result	Ref.
2004	Agnes Monica	Top 25 Hottest Celebrities Under 25	Included	
2004	Agnes Monica	Top of Mind Brand Young Celebrities	#2	
2010	Agnes Monica	Artist of the Year	Won	

=== Hard Rock FM Jakarta ===
Year	Nominee / work	Award	Result	Ref.
2008	Agnes Monica	30 Most Inspiring People Under 30	Included	

=== Hard Rock Hollywood ===
Year	Nominee / work	Award	Result	Ref.
2026	Agnez Mo	Agnez Mo's costumes now sit at Hard Rock Hollywood beside Michael Jackson's collection	Recipient	

=== I Fashion Festival ===
The I Fashion Festival (IFF) are an awards ceremony presented by MNC Fashion, MNC Lifestyle and MNC Channels, to honour artists who have motivated and been appreciated in various categories. Agnes has received one award.

Year	Nominee / work	Award	Result	Ref.
2015	Agnez Mo	Lifestyle Awards in Music	Recipient	

=== Indonesian American Business Council (IABC) ===
The Indonesian American Business Council (IABC) is a dynamic organization committed to strengthening economic and professional ties between Indonesia and the United States. Agnez Mo has received one award.

Year	Nominee / work	Award	Result	Ref.
2026	Agnez Mo	Lifestyle Awards in Music	Recipient	

=== Indonesian Children Newspaper ===
Year	Nominee / work	Award	Result	Ref.
2009	Agnes Monica	100 Most Influential People in Indonesia	#70	
2010	Agnes Monica	100 Most Influential People in Indonesia	#36	
2011	Agnes Monica	100 Most Influential People in Indonesia	#24	

=== Indonesian News Channel ===
The Indonesian News Channel has presenting awards to artists who had selected as INC Top 5 Favorite Music Videos. Agnes has received one award.

Year	Nominee / work	Award	Result	Ref.
2005	Agnes Monica	Favorite Female Music Video	Won	

=== Indonesian Wannabe Awards ===
Year	Nominee / work	Award	Result	Ref.
2015	Agnez Mo	Favorite Singer Fashionable	Won	
2015	Agnez Mo	Favorite Singer Of The Year	Won	
2016	Agnez Mo	Celebrity Socmed Of The Year	Won	
2017	Agnez Mo	Celebrity Socmed Of The Year	Won	

=== InJourney Airports (Soekarno Hatta International Airport) ===
Year	Nominee / work	Award	Result	Ref.
2026	Agnez Mo	Indonesia Berkarya Award 2026	Recipient	

=== Intens (Entertainment Program of RCTI) ===
Year	Nominee / work	Award	Result	Ref.
2011	Agnes Monica	Most Inspiration Celebrity	Won	

=== Kawanku Celebs Awards ===
Year	Nominee / work	Award	Result	Ref.
2013	Agnes Monica	Best Female Artist	Won	

=== Kementerian Pertahanan Republik Indonesia (KEMHAN RI) ===
Year	Nominee / work	Award	Result	Ref.
2021	Agnez Mo	Duta Bangsa Bela Negara	Recipient	

=== Los Angeles FC (LAFC) ===
Year	Nominee / work	Award	Result	Ref.
2022	Agnez Mo	Captain of The Match	Recipient	

=== Madame Tussauds (Singapore) ===
Year	Nominee / work	Award	Result	Ref.
2022	Agnez Mo	Wax Figure	Recipient	

=== Madame Tussauds (Hongkong) ===
Year	Nominee / work	Award	Result	Ref.
2024	Agnez Mo	Wax Figure	Recipient	

=== Madame Tussauds (Hollywood) ===
Year	Nominee / work	Award	Result	Ref.
2026	Agnez Mo	Wax Figure	Recipient	

=== Metro TV Sampoerna (Program for Indonesian Youth) ===
Year	Nominee / work	Award	Result	Ref.
2004	Agnes Monica	The Diamond of My Country	Recipient	

=== Million Awards ===
Indonesian KFC and PT Swara Sangkar Emas has presenting "Million Award" to Agnes Monica for her album Agnes Is My Name, which sold over 1 million copies (est. 12 times platinum) in 3 months.

Year	Nominee / work	Award	Result	Ref.
2011	Agnes Is My Name	Album sold over 1 million copies in 3 months	Recipient	

=== MURI Records ===
The MURI honors the year's most impressive acts. Agnes has set one record.

Year	Nominee / work	Award	Result	Ref.
2012	simPati: Dance Like Agnes	Most Digital Dance Video Collection	Recipient	

=== Nugraha Bhakti Musik Indonesia ===
Began established in 2003, coincide Indonesian Music Day (Hari Musik Indonesia), the Nugraha Bhakti Musik Indonesia are an annual honor awards were presented by PAPPRI and Minister of Culture and Tourism, to highest honour for talent artists whose proved meritorious to the development of Indonesian music. Agnes has received one award.

Year	Nominee / work	Award	Result	Ref.
2011	Agnes Monica	Dedication and Contribution of the Indonesian Music	Recipient	

=== Nyata Magazine ===
The Nyata Reader's Choice Awards are an online awards were presented by magazine Nyata, to honour for artist in entertainment. Agnes has received one award.

Year	Nominee / work	Award	Result	Ref.
2005	Agnes Monica	Favorite Actress	Won	

=== Poster Magazine ===
The Poster Viewer's Choice Awards are an online awards were presented by Indonesian magazine, Poster, to awarded for celebrity in entertainment. Agnes has received one award.

Year	Nominee / work	Award	Result	Ref.
2003	Agnes Monica	Latest Artist	Won	

=== Prodo Magazine ===
Year	Nominee / work	Award	Result	Ref.
2008	Agnes Monica	20 Personages Who Make Indonesia Proud	Included	

=== PT. Pos Indonesia ===
Year	Nominee / work	Award	Result	Ref.
2015	Agnez Mo	Official Postal Stamp with Agnez Mo Face	Recipient	
2017	Agnez Mo	Brand Ambassador	Recipient	

=== Seputar Indonesia Newspaper ===
Year	Nominee / work	Award	Result	Ref.
2005	Agnes Monica	Artist of the Year	Won	
2006	Agnes Monica	Artist of the Year	Won	

=== Silet (Entertainment Program of RCTI) ===
Year	Nominee / work	Award	Result	Ref.
2004	Agnes Monica	Most Popular Teen Female Artist	Won	

=== simPATI Music ===
Year	Nominee / work	Award	Result	Ref.
2012	Agnes Monica	Appreciation for 200K Download in 1 month	Won	

=== Star Entertainer ===
Year	Nominee / work	Award	Result	Ref.
2007	Agnes Monica	Star Entertainer	Won	

=== Tatler Indonesia ===
Year	Nominee / work	Award	Result	Ref.
2021	Agnez Mo	Asia's Most Stylish	Won	

=== The Independent Critics ===
The Annual Independent Critics awards were presented by TC Candler and were established in 1990. It have publishes the world-famous of 100 Most Beautiful Faces List. Agnes has ranked No. 86.

Year	Nominee / work	Award	Result	Ref.
2015	Agnez Mo	100 Most Beautiful Faces Of 2015	#86	
2017	Agnez Mo	100 Most Beautiful Faces Of 2017	Nominated	
2018	Agnez Mo	100 Most Beautiful Faces Of 2018	Nominated	
2020	Agnez Mo	100 Most Beautiful Faces Of 2020	Nominated	
2021	Agnez Mo	100 Most Beautiful Faces Of 2021	Nominated	

=== TikTok ===
Year	Nominee / work	Award	Result	Ref.
2018	Agnez Mo	Most Popular Celebrities On TikTok Indonesia	Won	

=== Time Travel World ===
Year	Nominee / work	Award	Result	Ref.
2026	Agnez Mo	Most Famous Celebrities From Asia	Included	
2026	Agnez Mo	Asia's Icons That Inspire The World	#6	

=== Twitter ===
==== Indonesian Twitter ====
Year	Nominee / work	Award	Result	Ref.
2015	Agnez Mo	Most Followers On Twitter Indonesia	Won	
2016	Agnez Mo	Most Followers On Twitter Indonesia	Won	
2017	Agnez Mo	Most Followers On Twitter Indonesia	Won	
2018	Agnez Mo	Most Popular Artist On Twitter Indonesia	Won	
2019	Agnez Mo	Most popular hashtags in Indonesia	Won	
2019	Agnez Mo	Most Used Hashtag for Entertainment Category in Indonesia	Won	
2020	Agnez Mo	Most Discussed Entertainment Account in Indonesia	#2	
2020	#Agnation	Most Used Hashtag in Indonesia	#2	
2020	#Agnation	Most Used Entertainment Hashtag In Indonesia	Won	
2021	Agnez Mo	Most Discussed Entertainment Account in Indonesia	Won	

==== Twitter (Charts Artist) ====
Year	Nominee / work	Award	Result	Ref.
2021	Agnez Mo	Top 50 Female Top Artist With The Most Followers On Twitter	#20	

==== Twitter Counter ====
Year	Nominee / work	Award	Result	Ref.
2017	Agnez Mo	Top 100 Most Followers	#90	

=== United Masters ===
Year	Nominee / work	Award	Result	Ref.
2020	Agnez Mo	Top streaming Artists Of 2020	Recipient	

=== Vogue ===
Year	Nominee / work	Award	Result	Ref.
2016	Agnez Mo	Indonesia's Biggest Pop Diva	Recipient	

=== Womantalk Award ===
Year	Nominee / work	Award	Result	Ref.
2018	Agnez Mo	Women With The Coolest Hairstyles Of 2018	Won	

=== WITT (Indonesian Women Without Tobacco) ===
Year	Nominee / work	Award	Result	Ref.
2010	Agnes Monica	Kartini Award	Recipient	

=== YAR Music Festival ===
Year	Nominee / work	Award	Result	Ref.
2024	Agnez Mo	Headliner	Recipient	

=== YouGov-World Most Admired People (Indonesia) ===
Year	Nominee / work	Award	Result	Ref.
2018	Agnez Mo	2018 world's most admired (Woman) – country breakdown (Indonesia)	#2	
2019	Agnez Mo	2019 world's most admired (Woman) – country breakdown (Indonesia)	#4	
