= VH1 (Indonesian TV channel) =

Indonesian television channel

VH1 Indonesia
- Country: Indonesia
- Broadcast area: Indonesia
- Headquarters: Jakarta, Indonesia

Programming
- Languages: Indonesian, English

Ownership
- Owner: Media Nusantara Citra and MTV Networks Asia Pacific
- Sister channels: RCTI, TPI, Global TV, MTV Indonesia, Nickelodeon Indonesia

History
- Launched: 15 April 2005
- Closed: 5 March 2008
- Replaced by: Music TV, iNews

VH1 Indonesia was a television channel that aired from 2005 to 2008. Subsequently renamed several times, it is now known as iNews.

== Stations that aired VH1 ==
VH1 was available on:

- JakTV in Jakarta
- STV in Bandung
- TV Borobudur in Semarang
- TATV in Solo
- SBO TV in Surabaya
- Makassar TV in Makassar
- Batam TV in Batam
- Lampung TV in Bandar Lampung
- Deli TV in Medan
- Banjar TV in Banjarmasin

== See also ==
- MTV Indonesia
- MTV Networks Asia Pacific
