= List of programmes broadcast by Media Nusantara Citra =

Below is the list of programmes being broadcast by RCTI, MNCTV, GTV, and iNews.

== News ==
=== General news programmes ===
- Sindo Pagi - an Indonesian news programme broadcast by Sindonews TV
- Sindo Siang - an Indonesian news programme broadcast by Sindonews TV
- Sindo Sore - an Indonesian news programme broadcast by Sindonews TV
- Sindo Malam - an Indonesian news programme broadcast by Sindonews TV
- Sport Today - a sport news programme broadcast by Sportstars
- Sindo Today - a news programme broadcast by Sindonews TV in English language, for 30 minutes
- World Headlines - an international news programme broadcast by Sindonews TV

=== Local news programmes ===
News programme	Channel	Availability
Lintas iNews Aceh	MNCTV	Banda Aceh
Lintas iNews Bali	MNCTV	Denpasar
Lintas iNews Banten'	MNCTV	Jabodetabek
Lintas iNews Batam	MNCTV	Batam
Lintas iNews Bengkuku	MNCTV	Bengkulu
Lintas iNews Jabar	MNCTV	Bandung
Lintas iNews Jateng	MNCTV	Semarang
Lintas iNews Jatim	MNCTV	Surabaya
Lintas iNews Jogja	MNCTV	Yogyakarta
Lintas iNews Lampung	MNCTV	Lampung
Lintas iNews Sumbar	MNCTV	Padang
Lintas iNews Sumsel	MNCTV	Palembang
Lintas iNews Sumut	MNCTV	Medan
Sekitar Jabar	GTV	Bandung
Sekitar Jateng & DIY	GTV	Semarang, Yogyakarta
Seputar iNews Jabar	RCTI	Bandung
Seputar iNews Jateng	RCTI	Semarang
Seputar iNews Yogyakarta	RCTI	Yogyakarta
Seputar iNews Jatim	RCTI	Surabaya
Seputar iNews Bali	RCTI	Denpasar
Seputar iNews NTB	RCTI	Mataram
Seputar iNews NTT	RCTI	Kupang
Seputar iNews Aceh	RCTI	Banda Aceh
Seputar iNews Bengkulu	RCTI	Bengkulu
Seputar iNews Sumut	RCTI	Medan
Seputar iNews Sumbar	RCTI	Padang

=== Infotainment ===
- Celebrity Stories
- E-List
- On Location
- Selebriti & Asmara
- Serba 10
- VOA Pop News

== Soap operas ==
=== MNC Entertainment and MNC The Indonesian Channel ===
- Bintang
- Cerita SMA
- Diva
- Do Bee Do
- Idol Hi Five
- Jelita
- Kalo Cinta Jangan Belagu
- Kasih
- Munajah Cinta
- Pernikahan Dini
- Safira
- Si Eneng
- Si Entong

=== RCTI ===
- Alisa
- Lia
- Rafika
- Sekar

=== MNCTV ===
- Ronaldowati Babak 2
- Ucup Santri

== Feature ==
- Benang Merah
- Di Antara Kita
- Jendela
- Lintas Batas
- Mata Angin
- Sekitar Kita

== Recipes ==
- Oseng - Oseng
- Santapan Nusantara
- Selebriti Masak?

== Music ==
- Aksi Anak Bangsa
- Dangdut Mania Dadakan
- Hits
- Idola Cilik
- Indonesian Idol
- Kontes Dangdut Indonesia
- Musik Dahsyat

== Religion ==
- Assalamu'alaikum Ustadz
- Bengkel Hati
- Bimbingan Rohani
- Cermin Hati
- Curcol Al-Habsyi
- Duet Tausyiah
- Gang Senggol
- Hikmah Fajar
- Majelis Al-Zikra
- Majelis Sakinah
- Nikmatnya Sedekah
- Penyegerakan Rohani
- Sinaran Hati
- Sireman Qolbu
- Talbigh Akbar
- Wisata Ziarah

== Comedy ==
- Abdel & Temon
- Check In Check Out
- Pasar Modal
- X-Tra Heboh

== Standard cartoons ==
- Crayon Shin-chan
- Doraemon
- Bima-S
- Kiko
- Naruto
- Upin & Ipin
- BanG Dream!
- Aoashi
- D4DJ
- Captain Tsubasa

== Sports ==
- ASEAN Football Championship
- BWF World Tour
- Formula E
- 2025 Southeast Asian Games
- 2026 ASEAN Para Games
- FA Cup
- Premier League
- UEFA Women's Euro 2025
- UEFA Euro 2028
- UEFA Euro 2032
- AFC U-17 Asian Cup
- AFC U-20 Asian Cup
- AFC Champions League Elite
- AFC Champions League Two
- 2027 AFC Asian Cup
- 2031 AFC Asian Cup
- 2026 Asian Games
- 2026 Asian Para Games
- FIBA Asia Cup
- FIBA Basketball World Cup
- Indonesia Pro Futsal League

== Reality shows ==
=== RCTI ===
- Idol Hi Five
- Kacau
- Miss Indonesia
- Satu Lawan Banyak

=== MNCTV ===
- Bagi - Bagi Modal
- Grebek Pasar MNCTV
- It's Showtime Indonesia
- Mendadak Artis
- PHK Bukan Kiamat

=== GTV ===
- Bedah Rumah
- Dia Hebat
- The Dream Girls
- Let's Dance
- Pantang Ngemis
- Uang Kaget

== Games ==
- Deal Or No Deal Indonesia
- Hole in The Wall

== Paramount programmes ==
=== Nickelodeon ===
- The Adventures of Jimmy Neutron
- Avatar: The Legend of Aang
- The Backyardigans
- Blue's Clues
- ChalkZone
- Dora the Explorer
- The Fairly OddParents
- Go Diego Go
- My Life as a Teenage Robot
- SpongeBob SquarePants
- Wonder Pets!
