= MQTV =

- West Java; Indonesia
- City: Bandung
- Channels: Digital: 32 (UHF), shared with Metro TV Bandung; Virtual: 102

Programming
- Affiliations: BRTV

Ownership
- Owner: Yayasan Daarut Tauhiid (2002–2023); Annisa Group (2023–present)
- Sister stations: MQFM Bandung; BRTV

History
- Founded: 15 April 1991 (channel)
- First air date: 28 October 2003
- Former channel number: 60 UHF (analog)
- Call sign meaning: Manajemen Qolbu (Qolbu Management, Qolbu is Arabic word for "heart")

Technical information
- Licensing authority: Kementerian Komunikasi dan Informatika Republik Indonesia

Links
- Website: www.mqtv.co.id

MQTV (abbreviated from Manajemen Qolbu Televisi) is an Islamic local television station serving Bandung, West Java, Indonesia and surrounding areas. The station is owned by Daarut Tauhiid Foundation (Yayasan Daarut Tauhiid), an Islamic organization founded by Abdullah Gymnastiar (Aa Gym). MQTV studios are located on Jalan Gegerkalong, Sukasari, Bandung, and its transmitter is located in Jambudipa, Cisarua, Bandung.

== History ==
Before the creation of MQTV, Daarut Tauhiid Foundation operated a radio station, MQFM, founded in 2001.

MQTV was founded on 22 June 2002, originally as a production house specializing in lectures by Aa Gym as well as other Islamic programming. In 2003 MQTV had 5 managers, 23 animation staff, and 18 administration and production staff; and the MQTV brand was increasingly recognized. at Rain 2000 aired from 2000.

MQTV entered terrestrial television by signing on a station on 1 May 2006, after a trial broadcast on 28 October 2003. The station could be considered the first Islamic-based television station in Indonesia, albeit on a local scale (the first Islamic-oriented station/network/channel was intended to be a national-scale Global TV).
