= INews TV =

iNews TV may refer to:

- iNews, an Indonesian television network.
- i-News, a Philippines late night news program.
