= Kiko (TV series) =

Indonesian television series

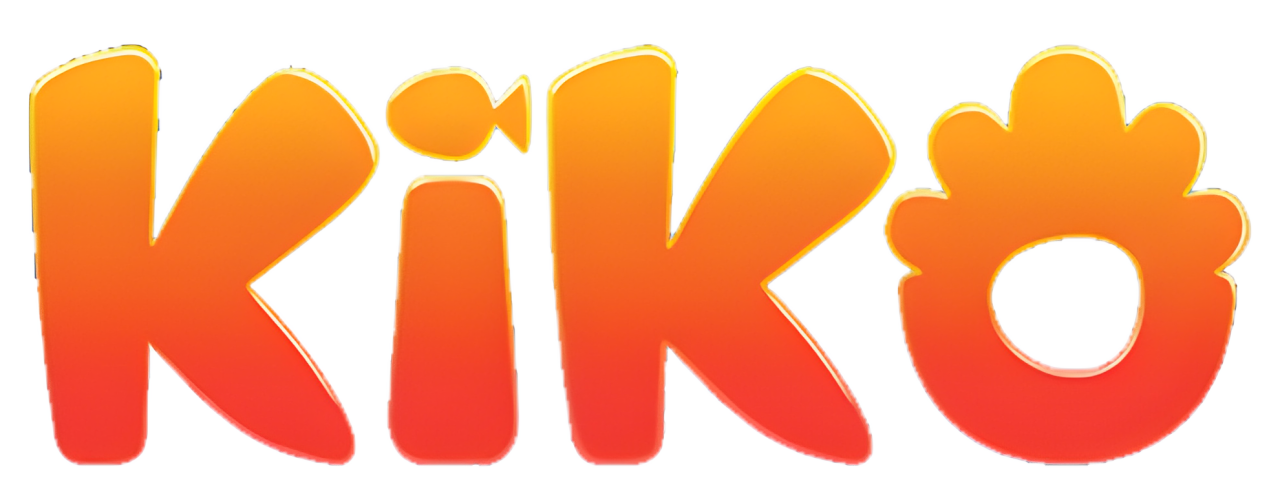
- Genre: Comedy; Action; Adventure
- Voices of: Susy Setiawati; Anastasia Amelia; Siti Balqis; Nurul Ulfah; Clara Dewanti; Bianca Christina El Hage; Leni M. Tarra; Ika Saraswati; Suherman Wijaya; Muhammad Azhari; Yani Pahlusi; Annemette Thea Kirana Hauglum; Lis Kurniasih; Sani Oktania; Bima Sakti; Sholihin; Ferry Irawan; Leonardo Jabadan Consul; Jati Andito; Adith Sidik Permana
- Theme music composer: Liliana Tanoesoedibjo
- Opening theme: Kiko by Difa Ryansyah
- Ending theme: Kiko by Difa Ryansyah
- Country of origin: Indonesia
- Original languages: Indonesian; English
- No. of seasons: pre-season (2014); 3 (2016-present)
- No. of episodes: 39 (pre-season); 103; 38 (short series)

Production
- Executive producers: Liliana Tanoesoedibjo pre-season & season 1-2); Nana Puspa Dewi (pre-season); Seung Hyun Oh (season 1-2); Ella Kartika (season 1-2); Sei Young Cheong (season 2)
- Running time: 7 minutes (pre-season); 11 minutes (season 1)
- Production company: MNC Animation

Original release
- Network: RCTI, MNCTV, ZooMoo, Disney XD
- Release: 9 August 2014 – 2 January 2022

Kiko is an Indonesian children's television series broadcast on RCTI. This animated series was produced by MNC Animation and has aired since 9 August 2014 (for pre-season) and 17 November 2014 (for season 1). This animated series was adapted from the comic strip Kisah si Kiko from the children's magazine Just for Kids. The second season of Kiko aired on RCTI starting 27 August 2017, and on 30 April 2020 the Kiko Animation Series was also aired on MNCTV.

== Synopsis ==
Kiko tells of a child of a goldfish who is very independent, even though he is an only child. Kiko who is always cheerful has four good friends, namely Lola the discus fish, Ting Ting the crab, Patino the iridescent shark and Poli the betta fish. On the other hand, the antagonists, Karkus the catfish and Pupus the eel, always make Kiko's life chaotic. One day, the lake where Kiko lives is polluted due to the reckless acts of humans, causing Kiko and friends to turn into mutants.

== Characters ==
Kiko (Goldfish)
Active, very smart, agile, and always a leader among his friends. Kiko is a fast runner, a good soccer player, and an honest and fun friend. His delinquency and curiosity sometimes lead him and his friends to fall into funny and fun adventures. Kiko is Ciko's older cousin.
Lola (Discus Fish)
Cooking and caring for a flower garden are this sensitive girl's hobbies. It's true, Lola is easily scared, a crybaby, and anxious. For issues of cleanliness or tidiness, though, she can become an assertive, brave perfectionist! She likes to try new recipes and does not hesitate to ask her friends to taste her cooking, whether it is a success or a failure.
Ting-Ting (Crab)
Enjoys experimenting.
Patino (Iridescent Shark)
This iridescent shark is Kiko's most powerful and loyal friend. He likes to eat, watch wrestling, and lift weights. He is insensitive and not very smart. He is not aware that he is a flexible and great ballet dancer. He was only afraid of starvation and ran out of Lola's cake.
Poli (Siamese Fighting / Betta Fish)
Behind his cold and overly honest nature, Poli is actually a shy child who is not good at expressing his feelings. Sportsmanship and loyalty to friends is the motto of Betta Fish, who likes extreme activities and self-defense. When angry, Poli can only be calmed by a sleep song, which reminds him of a mysterious childhood memory. If he feels sad, Poli will shout: Bete!.
Karkus (Catfish)
Catches fish for sale as a hobby.
Pupus (Yellow Eel)
Catches fish for sale as a hobby.
Buba (Crocodile)
Ciko (Goldfish)
A poor child who has hobbies like skateboarding, Ciko is the second great-grandson of King Robin Theon Parampaa and cousin of Kiko.
Patino's father (Iridescent Shark)
Patino's father has Patino's brown horned hair and has a mustache. Patino calls on his father, "Papa", in the episode "Dimana Patino?".
Occi (Octopus)
Kiko's new favorite friend as well as Kiko's pet in the second season of Kiko with the episode Teman Misterius.

== Episodes ==
In the pre-season (pre-school age version), there are 39 episodes with a duration of 7 minutes. There were 52 episodes in season 1, each of which lasted 11 minutes.

=== Pre-season ===
Episode	Premiere	Title
1	9 August 2014	Alat Nikung Tulalit
2-3	TBA	Mobil Kabur
2-3	TBA	Telur Bikin Kabur
4-6	TBA	Balon Balap
4-6	TBA	Kue Cengeng
4-6	TBA	Berani Nekat
7-8	TBA	Angin Heboh
7-8	TBA	Danau Beku
9-11	TBA	Ngebut Semerawut
9-11	TBA	Senang Terbang
9-11	TBA	Setrum Boy
12-13	TBA	Remote Canggih
12-13	TBA	Pesta Asoy Geboy
14-15	TBA	Super Kiko
14-15	TBA	Telur Bikin Kabur
16-18	TBA	Awas Meledak
16-18	TBA	Topeng Seram
16-18	TBA	Alat Nikung Tulalit
19-21	TBA	Jangan Mau Diadu
19-21	TBA	Trampolin Raksasa
19-21	TBA	Gara-Gara Gurita
22-24	TBA	Kangen Dimarahi
22-24	TBA	Kertas Ajaib
22-24	TBA	Setrum Boy
25-27	TBA	Roket Nyasar
25-27	TBA	Sok Enggak Laper
25-27	TBA	Perang Kusut
28-30	TBA	Foto Seru
28-30	TBA	Super Kiko
28-30	TBA	Seruling Cling Cling
31-33	TBA	Pemburu Diburu
31-33	TBA	Sok Enggak Laper
31-33	TBA	Seruling Cling Cling
34-36	TBA	Selancar Seru
34-36	TBA	Benci Tapi Rindu
34-36	TBA	Telur Bikin Kabur
37-39	TBA	Mobil Kabur
37-39	TBA	Angin Heboh
37-39	TBA	Ngebut Semerawut

=== Season 1 (2016–17) ===
Episode	Premiere	Title
1	7 February 2016	Pesta Kiko (Part 1 & 2)
2-3	14 February 2016	Joni Hilang
2-3	14 February 2016	Jangan Egois
4-5	21 February 2016	Nggak Usah Takut
4-5	21 February 2016	Dodol Lola
6	28 February 2016	Game Baru (Part 1 & 2)
7	6 March 2016	Jangan Ganggu
8	13 March 2016	Hari Terakhir
9	20 March 2016	Kado Dahsyat
10	3 April 2016	Ayo Kreatif
11	10 April 2016	Mandiin Buba
12	17 April 2016	Mencari Bunga Langka
13	24 April 2016	Maafkan Kami Lola
14	26 June 2016	Ingin Jadi Polisi
15	3 July 2016	Kiko Tertukar
16	10 July 2016	Nasib Di Tangan Anda
17	17 July 2016	Bayi Kabur
18	24 July 2016	Chocolala
19	31 July 2016	Serangan Kecebong
20	14 August 2016	Hari Jahil
21	21 August 2016	Terjebak Tong
22	28 August 2016	Rumah Angker
23	4 September 2016	Kristal Luar Angkasa
24	11 September 2016	Robot Penjaga
25	30 October 2016	Mermaids & Dragons
26	6 November 2016	Uang Kaget
27	13 November 2016	Episode Terakhir
28	20 November 2016	Fishtube
29	27 November 2016	Pendekar Dadakan
30	4 December 2016	Dimana Patino?
31	11 December 2016	Waktunya Main!
32	18 December 2016	Cewek Pemberani
33	25 December 2016	Hip Hop Ninja
34	8 January 2017	Bakat Patino
35	15 January 2017	Cyber Fans
36	22 January 2017	Kamera Antik
37	29 January 2017	Paket Misterius
38	12 March 2017	Gampang Kok!
39	19 March 2017	Awas Zombie!
40	26 March 2017	Kangen Buba
41	2 April 2017	Bajak Laut
42	9 April 2017	Jangan Tidur
43	16 April 2017	Pupus Kabur
44	23 April 2017	Buronan
45	30 April 2017	Tamu Usil
46	7 May 2017	Tangan Robot
47	14 May 2017	Pizza Monster
48	21 May 2017	Tolong Lola
49	28 May 2017	Balapan Seru (Part 1)
50	4 June 2017	Balapan Seru (Part 2)

=== Season 2 (2017–18) ===
Episode	Premiere	Title
1	27 August 2017	Teman Misterius
2	3 September 2017	Kolonel Arlo
3	10 September 2017	Ninja Kids
4	17 September 2017	Vampir
5	24 September 2017	Kenapa Poli?
6	1 October 2017	Super Fans
7	8 October 2017	Nasihat Buba
8	15 October 2017	Monster Gorong-Gorong
9	22 October 2017	Archer Warrior
10	29 October 2017	1000 Cegukan
11	5 November 2017	Shopping War
12	12 November 2017	The Giant
13	19 November 2017	Semalam di Galeri
14	24 December 2017	Natal Terindah
15	31 December 2017	Special Delivery
16	7 January 2018	Gara-gara Cupcake
17	14 January 2018	Coral Punch
18	21 January 2018	Panik di Karnaval
19	28 January 2018	Pahlawan Kostum
20	4 February 2018	Golden Race
21	11 February 2018	Menjadi Bangsawan
22	18 February 2018	Makhluk Misterius
23	25 February 2018	Siapa Juaranya?
24	4 March 2018	Kastil Terlarang
25	11 March 2018	Poli VS Ting-Ting
26	8 April 2018	Berburu Harta Karun (Part 1 & 2)
27	15 April 2018	Occi Hilang
28	22 April 2018	Demi Violet!
29	29 April 2018	Malam Horor
30	6 May 2018	Rasa Bersalah
31	13 May 2018	Kantong Berharga
32	20 May 2018	Lola Super Bersih
33	27 May 2018	Spy Drone
34	3 June 2018	Double Trouble
35	10 June 2018	Ayu dan Ting-Ting
36	24 June 2018	Teman Selamanya
37	1 July 2018	Si Anak Sulung
38	8 July 2018	Bukan Lola Biasa
39	15 July 2018	Rumah Paling Aman
40	22 July 2018	Keluar Batas
41	29 July 2018	Ratu Bunglon
42	5 August 2018	Pangeran Miskin
43	12 August 2018	Hutan Hitam
44	19 August 2018	Serangan Monster Raksasa
45	26 August 2018	Makhluk Hitam
46	2 September 2018	Ksatria Sejagad
47	9 September 2018	Salah Tangkap
48	16 September 2018	Cool Pizza
49	23 September 2018	Tongkat Cahaya Naga
50	30 September 2018	Petempuran Dasar Palung (Part 1)
51	7 October 2018	Petempuran Dasar Palung (Part 2)
52	14 October 2018	Tegangan Tinggi
53	21 October 2018	Mainan Terkutuk

=== Short series ===
As of November 2018, the Kiko Animation Series is now 2 minutes long named KIKO Mini Series

Episode	Premiere	Title
1-5	4 November 2018	Lika Liku Pejalan Kaki
1-5	4 November 2018	Berburu Kado
1-5	4 November 2018	Daftar Belanja
1-5	4 November 2018	Gara-gara Begadang
1-5	4 November 2018	Lomba Kostum
6-10	18 November 2018	Pinjam Sebentar
6-10	18 November 2018	Teror Kaleng
6-10	18 November 2018	Santai Saja
6-10	18 November 2018	Jangan Curang
6-10	18 November 2018	Sssh... Berisik
11-14	2 December 2018	Cokelat Patino
11-14	2 December 2018	Hari Belanja Online
11-14	2 December 2018	Dapur Seru Lola 1 & 2
15-19	16 December 2018	Pertolongan Pertama
15-19	16 December 2018	Main Bola Bersama Kiko
15-19	16 December 2018	Tanda Tangan Idola
15-19	16 December 2018	Jangan Jajan Sembarangan
15-19	16 December 2018	Safety First
20-23	6 January 2019	Warna Warni
20-23	6 January 2019	Eits, Tidak Boleh
20-23	6 January 2019	Permen Karet
20-23	6 January 2019	Akibat Nila Setitik
24-28	20 January 2019	Serunya Eksperimen Bersama Ting-Ting 1 & 2
24-28	20 January 2019	Mati Lampu
24-28	20 January 2019	Pizza Terakhir
24-28	20 January 2019	Selamatkan Terumbu Karang
29-32	10 February 2019	Hati Hati Hoax!
29-32	10 February 2019	Keren Ala Karkus
29-32	10 February 2019	Awas Bajakan!
29-32	10 February 2019	Tips Usaha Sukses Bareng Karkus
33-34	24 February 2019	Sang Penjaga
33-34	24 February 2019	Penyusup Malam
38	5 May 2019	Tips Menyebrang
35	10 March 2019	Kreatif Bersama Lola
36	24 March 2019	Ayo Jaga Tanaman
37	21 April 2019	Awas Penjahat!
38	2 January 2022	Pesta Tahun Baru

== Awards and nominations ==
Year	Appreciation	Nomination	Results
2015	Anugerah Komisi Penyiaran Indonesia 2015	Best Animation Program	Nominated
2016	Panasonic Gobel Awards 2016	Favorite Children's Programs & Animations	Won
2017	Indonesian Television Awards 2017	Most Popular Local Children Program	Won
2018	Indonesian Television Awards 2018	Most Popular Local Children Program	Won
2019	Asian Academy Creative Awards 2019	Best Children's Programs	Won
2019	Panasonic Gobel Awards 2019	Favorite Children's programs	Won
