= MTV (Indonesia) =

MTV Indonesia PT Musik Televisi Indonesia
- Final logo used from 1 July 2011 to 1 September 2012 and 1 November 2014 to 1 November 2015
- Type: Free-to-air television network
- Country: Indonesia
- Broadcast area: Indonesia; Singapore; Malaysia
- Network: MTV Southeast Asia (part of Viacom Media Networks Asia)
- Affiliates: ANteve (1995–2002); Suria (2001–2005); Global TV (2002–2012); RTV (2015)
- Headquarters: Jakarta, Indonesia

Programming
- Languages: Indonesian, English (subtitled)
- Picture format: 480i (SDTV)

Ownership
- Owner: Viacom (1995-2015); Media Nusantara Citra (2002–2012); Karsa Group (2014–2015)
- Parent: MTV Networks International
- Sister channels: Nickelodeon Indonesia; MTV Asia; VH1 Indonesia (2005–2008)

History
- Launched: 5 May 1995 (first launch); 1 November 2014 (second launch)
- Founder: MTV Asia
- Closed: 1 September 2012 (first closure); 1 November 2015 (second closure)
- Replaced by: MTV Asia; MTV Live (subscription channel); MTV 90s

Links
- Website: www.mtv.id

MTV Indonesia (PT Musik Televisi Indonesia until 2007) was an MTV-affiliated Indonesian television network. The network, which originally launched on 5 May 1995, on ANteve, was the fifth affiliate launched under the MTV brand. In 2002, they began to broadcast free-to-air over UHF for 24 hours a day, one of the first MTV-affiliates to do so. MTV Indonesia was part of the programming block on ANteve, along with other MTV Asia programs. It moved to the newly inaugurated Global TV network on 7 March 2002. It ceased broadcasting on 1 November 2015. However, it continues on social media.

== History ==
Logo of MTV Indonesia used from 5 May 1995 until 30 June 2011

MTV Indonesia launched on 5 May 1995, through ANteve, broadcasting in seven major Indonesian cities (Jakarta, Bandung, Semarang, Medan, Makassar, Bandar Lampung, and Surabaya). At the same time, MTV Indonesia, along with sister channel MTV Southeast Asia, was officially launched on the Palapa C2 digital satellite.

MTV Indonesia aired MTV shows such as: TRL, Fanatic, Diary: Europe and Asia, Most Wanted, Fresh, Alternative Nation, Asia Hitlist, Land, Rock, Absolute, Fresh, Connect, Wow, Non Stop Hits, 100% Indonesia, Ampuh and Screen. Like many MTV-affiliated programming broadcasts in other countries, MTV Indonesia was based on content from the United States and Asia, and non-English was subtitled.

ANteve ceased airing its MTV programming on 31 March 2002, due to a financial crisis.

On 7 March 2002, Global TV and MTV (through MTV Southeast Asia) partnered to air MTV Indonesia on a trial basis, and officially started on 1 April 2002. On 1 May that year, MTV Indonesia was trialed on Global TV, and on 8 October, Global TV officially launched it as a dedicated music television channel, airing 24 hours a day. MTV Indonesia on Global TV would become one of the world's first free-to-air television channels to air MTV programming for 24 hours a day.

On 15 January 2005, Global TV reduced its MTV-affiliated programming to its 9am-2pm and graveyard slots and replaced it with original Global TV programming, following an agreement between MTV Asia and MNC Media owner Hary Tanoesoedibjo on 15 October 2004.

On 1 January 2007, Global TV and MNC Media acquired MTV Indonesia in an agreement with MTV Asia. Prior to 2007, MTV programs were taped in Malaysia, but following this acquisition Global TV and MNC Media produced MTV Indonesia programs in-house, under license from MTV Networks. Programs broadcast at this time include the MTV Indonesia Movie Awards, MTV Indonesia Music Awards, MTV Staying Alive, MTV EXIT, and the grand finale of MTV VJ Hunt.

On 1 January 2012, Global TV stopped airing MTV Indonesia, but still aired MTV EXIT without the MTV logo. Global TV still aired MTV advertising until 2014, however.

On 1 November 2014, MTV Indonesia relaunched with the tagline "1000% anak muda" ("1000% youth"), and aired on CTV networks in Jakarta, Bandung, Surabaya, Makassar, and Banjarmasin.

On 1 November 2015, MTV Indonesia ceased broadcasting for the second time after Grup Karsa did not renew its contract with MTV's parent company Viacom.

== Radio and Magazine ==
MTV Trax, established on 1 January 2000, was a radio station using frequency 101.4 FM and available in Jakarta, Semarang and Yogyakarta.

MTV Magazine, founded on 1 January 2000, in Jakarta, was an entertainment publication covering music, movies, and lifestyle. After the franchise ended, it was rebranded as Trax Magazine.

== Video Jockeys ==
Video jockeys (VJs) that attained prominence through MTV Indonesia include:

- Daniel Mananta
- Rianti Cartwright
- Mike Muliadro
- Marissa Nasution
- Ben Kasyafani
- Boy William
- Rizky Triyantono
- Robby Purba
- Vincent Club 80's
- Linkga ICT gank's
- Desta Club 80's
- Hilyani
- Fikri Ramadhan
- Ramon Yusuf Tungka
- Aurellio
- Nino Fernandez
- Arie K. Untung
- Caroline Soerachmat
- Aditya Fadilla SJk
- Surya Dini
- Nadya Hutagalung
- Jamie Aditya
- Sarah Sechan
- Dewi Rezer
- Edi Brokoli
- Nirina Zubir
- Shanty
- Cathy Sharon
- Evan Sanders
- Alblen Filindo Fabe
- Vina Yuanna
- Millane Fernandez
- Chawenk
- Alex Abbad

== Programming ==
The programming just before MTV Indonesia ceased broadcasting included:

- Catfish: The TV Show
- Chart Attack
- Japan Hits
- K-Wave
- MTV Europe Music Awards
- MTV Hits
- MTV Movie Awards
- MTV Musika
- MTV Sessions
- MTV Video Music Awards
- MTV VJ Hunt 2014
- MTV World Stage
- OK Karaoke
- Pimp My Ride
- Pranked
- Punk'd
- The Ride
- Ridiculousness

== Slogans ==
- Tetap Jreng di Tahun Noceng, Nonton Terus MTV ("Stay Cool in the Noceng Year, Keep Watching MTV") (1999–2002)
- Nongkrong Terus di MTV ("Hanging Out on MTV") (2002–2005)
- MTV Gue Banget ("MTV Is Just Me") (2002–2012)
- 1000% Anak Muda ("1000% Youth") (2014–2015)

== See also ==
- Nickelodeon Indonesia
- VH1 Indonesia
- MTV Networks Asia
