= MTV Europe Music Award for Best Asia and Pacific Act =

Category of MTV Europe Music Awards

The following is a list of the MTV Europe Music Award winners and nominees for Best Asia and Pacific Act.

== 2010's ==
Year	Winner	Nominees
2011	Big Bang	Agnes Monica; Exile; Gotye; Jane Zhang; Jay Chou; Sia
2012	Han Geng	Gotye

== See also ==
- MTV VMA International Viewer's Choice Award for MTV Asia
- MTV VMA International Viewer's Choice Award for MTV Australia
- MTV VMA International Viewer's Choice Award for MTV China
- MTV VMA International Viewer's Choice Award for MTV Japan
- MTV VMA International Viewer's Choice Award for MTV Korea
- MTV VMA International Viewer's Choice Award for MTV Mandarin
- MTV VMA International Viewer's Choice Award for MTV Southeast Asia
- MTV Asia Awards
- MTV Australia Awards
- MTV Video Music Awards Japan
- MTV Pilipinas Music Awards
