= GTV (Indonesian TV network) =

Indonesian private television network

GTV PT Global Informasi Bermutu
- Logo since 11 October 2017, with the alphabet of "G" was revised from the 2006 Global TV logo
- Type: Television broadcaster
- Country: Indonesia
- Broadcast area: Nationwide
- Network: MTV Southeast Asia (2001–2007)
- Affiliates: MTV Indonesia (2002–2012); Nickelodeon (2006–2026)
- Headquarters: Studios: MNC Studios, Jl. Raya Perjuangan No. 1, Kebon Jeruk, West Jakarta; News Studios: iNews Center, Lt. 7, Jl. K.H. Wahid Hasyim No. 28, Kebon Sirih, Menteng, Central Jakarta

Programming
- Language: Indonesian
- Picture format: 1080i HDTV (downscaled to 16:9 576i for the SDTV feed)

Ownership
- Owner: Indonesian Association of Muslim Intellectuals (1999–2001); IIFTIHAR (1999–2001); Titian Paraputra Sejahtera (1999–2001); MNC Media (2001–present)
- Parent: Global Mediacom (MNC Asia Holding)
- Key people: Valencia Tanoesoedibjo (Director)
- Sister channels: RCTI (2001–present); MNCTV (2003–present); iNews (2008–present); Metro TV (2001–2003)

History
- Founded: 22 March 1999; 27 years ago (as GIB and corporate); 8 October 1999; 27 years ago (Official birthday and anniversary)
- Launched: 8 October 2001 (Trial broadcast; as Global TV); 8 October 2002; 24 years ago (Official broadcast); 11 October 2017 (as GTV)
- Founder: Nasir Tamara (Indonesian Association of Muslim Intellectuals); IIFTIHAR
- Former names: GIB (1999); Global TV (1999–2017)

Links
- Website: www.gtv.id

Availability

Terrestrial
- Digital: Check local frequencies (in Indonesian language)

Streaming media
- RCTI+: Watch live (Indonesia only)
- Vision+: Watch live (Subscription required, Indonesia only)

PT Global Informasi Bermutu, commonly operating and known as GTV, which is an initialism derived from its previous name, Global TV is an Indonesian free-to-air private television network. It was launched on 8 October 2002. Originally a music television channel as MTV broadcaster in Indonesia and Asia, it was one of the first television network in the world to broadcast MTV for 24 hours a day free-to-air over UHF. GTV shifted its focus to general entertainment programming targeting young adults. Currently, the broadcaster airs news, sports, soap opera, reality and game shows, along with Nickelodeon animation series and anime, making up its programming schedule. It is owned by Media Nusantara Citra (MNC), which also owns RCTI, MNCTV and iNews.

== History ==
Global TV was originally established on 22 March 1999 by joint-venture of formerly government-backed Islamic association ICMI and The International Islamic Forum for Science, Technology and Human Resource (IIFTIHAR) under the name Global IIFTIHAR Broadcasting and company name PT Global Investasi Bermutu. The network was intended for Islamic dawah, as well as education, technology, news, sports and human development programming - it would become the first Islamic-oriented of its kind in Indonesia (the first Islamic-oriented television station later hold by Bandung-based local station MQTV in 2006). Global TV obtained a broadcast license on 25 October 1999 during the Habibie administration.

Bimantara Citra acquired Global TV with its subsidiary PT Panca Andika Mandiri (then renamed to MNC Media) as new owner in 2001 and changed the company's name to PT Global Informasi Bermutu and thus, replacing SCTV as RCTI's new sister network. Global TV began its trial broadcast on 8 October 2001 in Jakarta.

During the trial broadcast, Global TV aired many foreign music videoes with Dewi Rezer, some of which are Kylie Minogue's "In Your Eyes", Creed's "My Sacrifice", OutKast's "Ms. Jackson" and Brandy's "What About Us?".

On 7 March 2002, Global TV and MTV Asia began partnership to broadcasting MTV Indonesia which was previously aired on ANteve, bur was stopped due to financial crisis.

MTV officially started on Global TV from 1 April 2002 with programs such as MTV Land, MTV Most Wanted, MTV Alternative Nation, MTV WOW, MTV Classic, MTV Asia Hitlist and MTV Ampuh. In that period, Global TV used the TVG name on their logo with grey color (later blue and green color added on 1 May 2002, the grey logo used during commercial break in 2005 until 2006).

On 1 May 2002, MTV officially launched on Global TV while still trial broadcast.

Global TV expanded broadcasts into 5 cities (Bandung, Yogyakarta, Surabaya, Medan and Palembang) in August 2002 with 15 hours transmission programs from 09:00 to 24:00 WIB, on 1 October 2002, the block was expanded into 17 hours transmission programs from 07:00 to 24:00 WIB.

On 8 October 2002, Global TV officially launched as music television channel in Indonesia and Asia as a MTV broadcaster with commenced 24-hours around the clock transmission broadcasts with music and programs from Indonesia, Asia and its sister network in United States, it also become the world first free-to-air television channel to aired MTV for 24-hours non stop. Global TV became first and only music television channel in Indonesia.

Global TV's main target audience are teenagers, hence the slogan "Indonesian Youth TV Oriented Channel".

The Global TV on-air logo always change the color during 24-hour with MTV, for example, the logo changed to green/yellow on Ramadan, and red/white (second after TPI) on Independence Day, following MTV color logo. Making the first and only Indonesian television channel to change color during Ramadan and Independence Day.

After three years as a music television channel, on 15 January 2005, Global TV shifted to general entertainment programming and began producing its own television programs for its 12-hour broadcast and officially launched on Grand Launching Global TV Sejuta Satu Malam, This because Global TV and MTV reach agreement on 15 October 2004 to reduced MTV program to 12-hours with MNC Media owner Hary Tanoesoedibjo.

On the same day, it expanded its coverage area to 18 cities in Indonesia and introduce new slogan "Seru!", the slogan itself also appear on the Global TV logo during on-air.

On the same year, Global TV became broadcaster of Formula 1 and A1.

On 1 February 2006, Global TV and MTV Networks began partnership to broadcast program Nickelodeon for kids in Global TV with programs such as SpongeBob SquarePants, Blue's Clues and Dora the Explorer. it also introduced Nick di Global TV.

On the same year, Global TV became the broadcaster of Serie A.

On 1 January 2007, Global TV and MNC Media acquired MTV Indonesia after previous contract agreement with MTV Asia, Global TV officially started produced and create MTV programs, previously tapped in Malaysia and now broadcast live on Global TV studio such as MTV Global Room, MTV Ampuh, MTV Total Request and MTV Insomnia. MTV logo which previously appear during on-air and commercial break, now disappear during commercial break like Nickelodeon logo on Global TV.

Global TV became one of the broadcasters of UEFA Euro 2008 alongside RCTI and TPI.

In 2009, Global TV became broadcaster of 2009 FIFA Confederations Cup and 2010 FIFA World Cup alongside RCTI.

In 2010, Global TV became broadcaster of Premier League from 2010–11 to 2012–13 with MNCTV.

In 2011, MTV program on Global TV only aired in the midnight, started from 01:00 to 04:00 WIB.

On 1 January 2012, Global TV stopped aired MTV program after 10 years. but still aired MTV EXIT on 1 September 2012.

On 11 October 2017, Global TV was rebranded as GTV and introduced a new logo for its 15th anniversary (Amazing 15), the name GTV already use as Global TV initial.

Since November 2017 after the re-branding, GTV had not aired any sporting events until 2019.

GTV began broadcasting the E-Sport tournaments/contests (including talent searching show)/events in 2019.

Since 30 December 2020, GTV has returned into the New DVB-T2 transmitter operated by RCTI for Jakarta and surrounding with Digital Television until migrated from Analogue signal (PAL-B/G) since 3 November 2022 after moved to 28 UHF Digital channel.

GTV Jakarta, and RCTI, didn't sign off the analogue service on November 3, 2022, and later was permanently shut down on November 4, 2022, at 12:00am following MNCTV, iNews and RCTI to sign off the analogue service and switch over to DVB-T2 serving Greater Jakarta.

== Branding ==
=== Logos ===
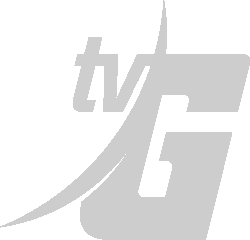
First Global TV logo, known as TVG, used during trial broadcast from 8 October 2001 to 1 May 2002, later used for commercial break from 15 January 2005 until 13 October 2006

First Global TV logo with color added, used from 1 May 2002 to 13 October 2006

Second Global TV logo, used from 13 October 2006 to 1 July 2008

Third Global TV logo, used from 1 July 2008 until 28 March 2012

Fourth and last Global TV logo, used from 28 March 2012 to 11 October 2017

=== Slogans ===
As Global TV

- 2002–2005:
  - Nongkrong Terus di MTV (Keep Hanging Out on MTV)
  - MTV Gue Banget (MTV is So Me) (along with MTV Indonesia)
- 2005–2017:
  - Millions of Entertainment (sub-slogan until 2006)
  - Global TV Seru! (Global TV is Exciting!) (Note: The slogan remain used on social media, for example @Globaltvseru on Twitter as username since 1 July 2008 until 11 October 2017, the slogan return on 2013.)
- 2008–2011: Untuk Keluarga Indonesia (For Indonesian Families)
- 2011–2013: 100% Seru! (100% Exciting!)

As GTV

- 2017–2026: Pilihan Terbaik Keluarga Indonesia (Indonesian Families' Best Choice)
- 2023–2026: #ItsFamilyTime (sub-slogan)
- 2026–present: Generasi Penerus Bangsa (The next generation)

== See also ==
- MTV Indonesia
- RCTI
- MNCTV
- iNews
- List of television stations in Indonesia

== Shows ==
- Family 100 (20??-nowadays)
- All Nickelodeon shows (2006-2008)
- SpongeBob SquarePants, (2006-July-August 2026)
- id:Take Me Out Indonesia, (20??-nowadays)

If there's an error, and if it's not complete, please revise this chapter.
