= Media Nusantara Citra =

Indonesian media company

PT Media Nusantara Citra Tbk
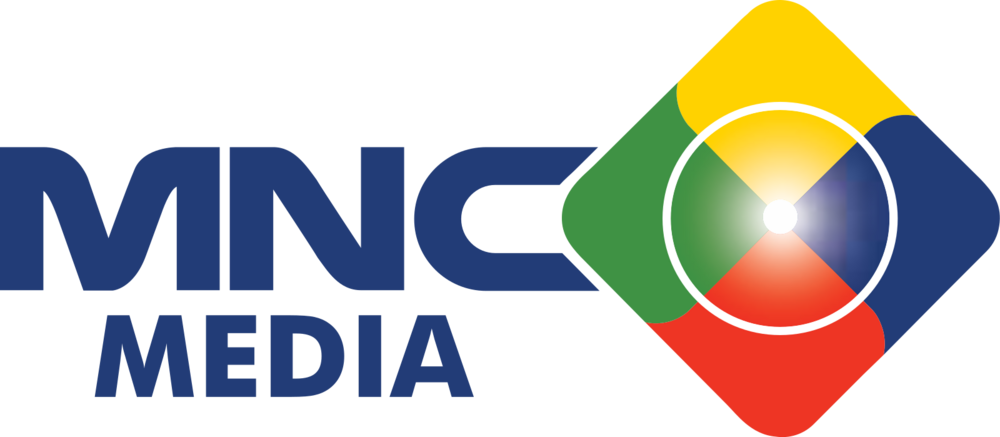
- Type: Public
- Traded as: IDX: MNCN
- Industry: Mass media
- Founded: 17 June 1997; 29 years ago
- Founder: Sutjiati; M. Tahir; Chairil Amri; Yenny Kandou
- Headquarters: MNC Tower; Jalan Kebon Sirih Raya No. 17-19, Kebon Sirih, Jakarta, Indonesia
- Key people: Hary Tanoesoedibjo (President Commissioner) President Director: Noersing Director: Tantan Sumartana; Kanti Mirdiati Imansyah; Dini Putri; Ruby Panjaitan
- Services: Television broadcasting; Print; Radio network; Advertising agency; Music industry; Production house; Financial service
- Revenue: ▲ Rp 8.353 trillion (2019)
- Net income: ▲ Rp 2.352 trillion (2019)
- Total assets: ▲ Rp 17.836 trillion (2019)
- Total equity: ▲ Rp 12.525 trillion (2019)
- Parent: MNC Tv (via Global Mediacom)
- Subsidiaries: PT Rajawali Citra Televisi Indonesia (RCTI); PT MNC Televisi Indonesia (MNCTV); PT Global Informasi Bermutu (GTV); PT MNC Televisi Network (iNews); PT Tivi Bursa Indonesia (IDX Channel); MNC Vision; Indonesia Transport; Hits Records; MNC Radio Networks; Radio Efkindo; Radio Mediawisata Sariasih; Radio Prapanca Buana Suara; Radio Citra Borneo Madani; MNC Infrastruktur Utama; Linktone International Limited; Radio Swara Banjar Lazuardi; Media Nusantara Informasi; Radio Swara Caraka Ria; MNC Media Investasi; Crossmedia Internasional; Radio Mancasuara; Star Media Nusantara; MNC International Middle East Limited; Mediate Indonesia
- Website: www.mnc.co.id

PT Media Nusantara Citra Tbk, a.k.a. the MNC Media, or MNC, is an Indonesian media company. MNC's core businesses are content production. The group owns and operates four free-to-air television networks – RCTI, MNCTV, GTV, and iNews – as well as 19 pay television channels under MNC Channels division. MNC has other supporting media-based businesses. These include radio, print media, talent management, and a production house. The company operates as an integrated media company.

== History ==
It was founded on 17 June 1997 as PT Panca Andika Mandiri.

It was renamed to the present name on 12 September 2002.

- Original members (2002):
  - RCTI
  - tvG, now GTV
  - TPI (Televisi Paling Indonesia), now MNCTV

It listed its shares on the Indonesia Stock Exchange (IDX) on 22 June 2007 under the ticker symbol MNCN. In June 2016, MNCN received an investment from Creador, a private equity firm in Southeast and South Asia. The investment helped expand production facilities and enhance free-to-air services across an underpenetrated Indonesian market.

== Ownership ==
It is owned by PT Global Mediacom Tbk (formerly PT Bimantara Citra Tbk), which in turn is owned by MNC Asia Holding. On 17 October 2011, Los Angeles–based investment company Saban Capital Group acquired a 7.5% stake.

== Business ==
MNC is the largest free-to-air market network in Indonesia. The group has three pay television networks, Indovision, Okevision and Top TV. (Until on 12 December 2017 as MNC Vision, Acquired by MNC As K-Vision, Until 10 September 2024 as MNC PLAY and Streaming Platform Vision+ It operates Sindo Media which includes Koran Sindo newspaper, a portal sindonews.com, and Sindo Weekly Magazine. Other portals include Okezone, Celebrities.id, and Sportstars.id.

== Logo history ==
The first logo of Media Nusantara Citra (2002–2009)

The logo of Media Nusantara Citra (2009), (prototype)

The second logo used by MNC and a "Media" text (2009-2014)

The third logo of MNC, it's short-lived and a "Media" text (2014-2015)

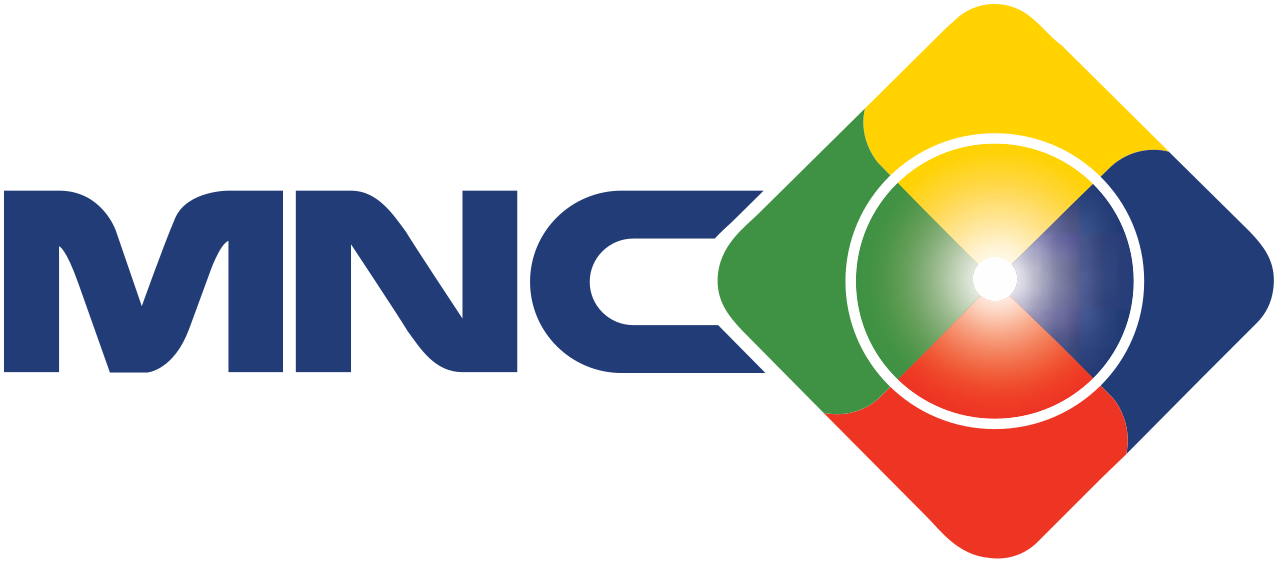
The fourth logo of Media Nusantara Citra (since 20 May 2015). (in PNG)

The fourth logo of Media Nusantara Citra (since 20 May 2015). (in SVG)

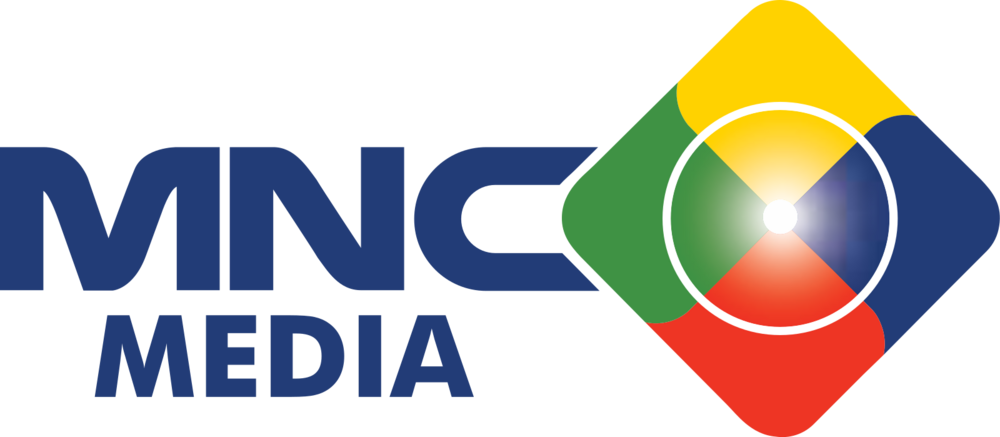
The fourth logo of MNC Media (since 20 May 2015).

== See also ==
- List of programmes broadcast by Media Nusantara Citra
